= 1989 in music =

This is a list of notable events in music that took place in the year 1989.

== Specific locations ==
- 1989 in British music
- 1989 in Japanese music
- 1989 in Norwegian music
- 1989 in Scandinavian music
- 1989 in South Korean music

== Specific genres ==
- 1989 in country music
- 1989 in heavy metal music
- 1989 in hip-hop
- 1989 in jazz
- 1989 in progressive rock

== Events ==
- January 14 – Paul McCartney releases Снова в СССР (Back in the USSR) exclusively in the USSR. Bootleg copies sell for as much as US$1,000 in the United States.
- January 23 – James Brown is sentenced in Georgia, US, to six years in jail in connection with a police chase through two different states.
- January 27 – Michael Jackson ends the Bad World Tour in Los Angeles, US.
- February 12
  - Roy Orbison joins Elvis Presley as the only singers to ever simultaneously have two top 5 albums on the Billboard charts.
  - Tiny Tim launches an unsuccessful campaign to be elected mayor of New York City, US.
- February 17 – Whitesnake's David Coverdale marries Tawny Kitaen.
- February 22 – The 31st Annual Grammy Awards are presented in Los Angeles, hosted by Billy Crystal. George Michael's Faith wins Album of the Year, while Bobby McFerrin's "Don't Worry, Be Happy" wins both Record of the Year and Song of the Year. Tracy Chapman wins Best New Artist.
- March 1 – The first Ars Musica, an annual international contemporary music festival held in Brussels, opens.
- March 21 – Madonna's "Like a Prayer" music video, taped in late December 1988, attracts criticism for its use of Catholic Church iconography and for the use of cross burning imagery, but also garners praise for its interpretation of discrimination, rape, and faith. Pepsi drops Madonna as a spokesperson out of fear the video will cause religious groups to boycott the company.
- April 9 – The Rolling Stones' Bill Wyman announces that he will marry 19-year-old Mandy Smith, his girlfriend for six years.
- April 12 – Michael Jackson is named "King of Pop" after receiving the Soul Train Heritage Awards.
- April 29 – Jon Bon Jovi marries his high school sweetheart Dorothea Hurley at the Graceland Wedding Chapel in Las Vegas, Nevada, US.
- May 1 – California jewelry store employees call the police reporting a suspicious person hanging around their store. The person turns out to be Michael Jackson shopping in disguise.
- May 6 — The 34th annual Eurovision Song Contest, held at Palais de Beaulieu in Lausanne, is won by Yugoslavian band Riva, with the song "Rock Me". This is the first year a Balkan country has won the contest, and is also the only win for Yugoslavia as a unified state.
- July 9 – All four original members of The Monkees reunite in Los Angeles, US, for a concert performance at the Universal Amphitheatre. The following day the quartet attend an induction ceremony at the Hollywood Walk of Fame, where they receive a star.
- July 23 – Former Beatle Ringo Starr's new band, Ringo Starr & His All-Starr Band, plays its first show, in Dallas, US.
- July 29 – The Bee Gees perform in the U.S. for the first time in 10 years as part of their One for All world tour.
- August 3 – Tenor Sergio Franchi collapses while rehearsing for a concert in the United States; he dies 9 months later of brain cancer.
- August 12–13 – The Moscow Music Peace Festival is held in the Soviet Union. The event is put together by Doc McGhee and sponsored by his Make A Difference Foundation, and headline acts include Bon Jovi, Ozzy Osbourne, Mötley Crüe, Skid Row, Cinderella, and the Scorpions.
- August 31 – The Rolling Stones open their Steel Wheels North American tour in Philadelphia, US.
- September 9
  - The Morton H. Meyerson Symphony Center, designed by I. M. Pei, opens in Dallas, Texas, US.
  - Madonna gives a risqué performance at the 1989 MTV Video Music Awards. Clad in baggy black sweatpants and a black bustier, she shocks the audience by simulating masturbation. The version of the song used in the show would later serve as the opening number of 1990's "Blond Ambition World Tour".
- October 15 – Media Rings Corporation, the Japanese music, video game and software publishing company, is founded in Akasaka.
- November 18 – The 18th OTI Festival, held at the theater of the James L. Knight Center in Miami, United States, is won by the song "Una canción no es suficiente", written by Jesús Monarrez, and performed by Analí representing Mexico.
- December 23 – Ice Cube leaves N.W.A after financial problems and several conflicts with their manager Jerry Heller and the group's founder Eazy-E. By this time, Cube has been recording his solo debut album, which will be released next year.
- Undated
  - During a break from working with Iron Maiden, guitarist Adrian Smith releases a solo album with his band A.S.a.P., entitled Silver and Gold while vocalist Bruce Dickinson also begins work on a solo album with former Gillan guitarist Janick Gers; Smith subsequently leaves Iron Maiden and is replaced by Gers.

== Bands formed ==
- Dark Tranquillity
- The Listening Pool
- The Osborn Sisters

== Bands disbanded ==
- Felt
- Survivor

== Bands reformed ==
- Cluster
- Luv'
- Plasmatics

== Albums released ==
All releases are an LP record unless otherwise stated.
Multiple entries for the same day are arranged alphabetically by the album's name.
Release dates may vary in different countries.

=== January–March ===
Release		Album	Artist	Notes
J A N U A R Y	1	Petra Means Rock	Petra	Compilation
J A N U A R Y	9	A Show of Hands	Rush	Live album
J A N U A R Y	10	Bluebird	Emmylou Harris	-
J A N U A R Y	10	New York	Lou Reed	-
J A N U A R Y	10	Skeletons in the Closet	Oingo Boingo	Compilation
J A N U A R Y	13	The Raw and the Cooked	Fine Young Cannibals	-
J A N U A R Y	16	Desert Wind	Ofra Haza	-
J A N U A R Y	18	The Whitey Album	Ciccone Youth	-
J A N U A R Y	23	Hunkpapa	Throwing Muses	-
J A N U A R Y	23	Lōc-ed After Dark	Tone Lōc	-
J A N U A R Y	23	Oh Yes I Can	David Crosby	-
J A N U A R Y	24	Electric Youth	Debbie Gibson	-
J A N U A R Y	24	Skid Row	Skid Row	Debut
J A N U A R Y	25	After the War	Gary Moore	US
J A N U A R Y	25	Straight Outta Compton	N.W.A	-
J A N U A R Y	29	Veuillez rendre l'âme (à qui elle appartient)	Noir Désir	France
J A N U A R Y	30	Fabulous Disaster	Exodus	US version (originally released in Europe in 1988)
J A N U A R Y	30	Technique	New Order	-
J A N U A R Y	31	Dirty Rotten Filthy Stinking Rich	Warrant	Debut
J A N U A R Y	31	Life Is...Too Short	Too Short	-
J A N U A R Y	31	Triumphant Return	Whitecross	-
J A N U A R Y	?	3	Violent Femmes	-
F E B R U A R Y
F E B R U A R Y	1	Don't Tell a Soul	The Replacements	-
F E B R U A R Y	1	Force Majeure	Doro Pesch	Solo Debut
F E B R U A R Y	1	The Great Radio Controversy	Tesla	-
F E B R U A R Y	3	Meshuggah	Meshuggah	Debut/EP
F E B R U A R Y	6	Beyond the Blue Neon	George Strait	-
F E B R U A R Y	6	Dylan & the Dead	Bob Dylan and Grateful Dead	Live album
F E B R U A R Y	7	As Nasty As They Wanna Be	2 Live Crew	-
F E B R U A R Y	7	Blessing in Disguise	Metal Church	-
F E B R U A R Y	7	Mystery Girl	Roy Orbison	-
F E B R U A R Y	7	Spike	Elvis Costello	-
F E B R U A R Y	13	A New Flame	Simply Red	-
F E B R U A R Y	20	Storm the Studio	Meat Beat Manifesto	-
F E B R U A R Y	21	Animotion	Animotion	-
F E B R U A R Y	21	Intuition	TNT	-
F E B R U A R Y	22	Jed	Goo Goo Dolls	-
F E B R U A R Y	27	Oranges & Lemons	XTC	-
F E B R U A R Y	27	Playing With Fire	Spacemen 3	-
F E B R U A R Y	28	Indigo Girls	Indigo Girls	-
M A R C H	1	Best of Ozz	Ozzy Osbourne	Compilation; Japan
M A R C H	3	3 Feet High and Rising	De La Soul	-
M A R C H	6	Moss Side Story	Barry Adamson	Debut
M A R C H	6	When Dream and Day Unite	Dream Theater	Debut
M A R C H	7	Girl You Know It's True	Milli Vanilli	U.S. version of All or Nothing
M A R C H	10	Mr. Jordan	Julian Lennon	-
M A R C H	12	Grip It! On That Other Level	Geto Boys	-
M A R C H	13	101	Depeche Mode	Live double album
M A R C H	13	Another Place and Time	Donna Summer	-
M A R C H	14	Extreme	Extreme	Debut
M A R C H	14	Road to the Riches	Kool G Rap & DJ Polo	-
M A R C H	14	Spell	Deon Estus	-
M A R C H	20	Cross That Line	Howard Jones	-
M A R C H	20	Saraya	Saraya	-
M A R C H	20	Shine	Mother Love Bone	Debut/EP
M A R C H	21	Like a Prayer	Madonna	-
M A R C H	21	Nick of Time	Bonnie Raitt	-
M A R C H	21	Somewhere Between	Suzy Bogguss	Debut
M A R C H	22	Make Them Die Slowly	White Zombie	-
M A R C H	24	Wide-Eyed Wonder	The Choir	-
M A R C H	27	Larger than Life	Jody Watley	-
M A R C H	28	Alannah Myles	Alannah Myles	-
M A R C H	?	President Yo La Tengo	Yo La Tengo	-
M A R C H	?	Something Real	Phoebe Snow	-
M A R C H	?	Yellow Moon	The Neville Brothers	-

=== April–June ===
Release		Album	Artist	Notes
A P R I L	3	When the World Knows Your Name	Deacon Blue	-
A P R I L	4	The Breathtaking Blue	Alphaville	-
A P R I L	7	Beneath the Remains	Sepultura	-
A P R I L	10	Club Classics Vol. One	Soul II Soul	-
A P R I L	10	Raging Silence	Uriah Heep	-
A P R I L	10	Sonic Temple	The Cult	-
A P R I L	10	Twist of Shadows	Xymox	-
A P R I L	12	...Twice Shy	Great White	-
A P R I L	12	Garth Brooks	Garth Brooks	-
A P R I L	12	Straight to the Sky	Lisa Lisa and Cult Jam	-
A P R I L	17	Blaze of Glory	Joe Jackson	-
A P R I L	17	Doolittle	Pixies	-
A P R I L	17	Headless Cross	Black Sabbath	-
A P R I L	17	One	Bee Gees	-
A P R I L	19	Buzz Factory	Screaming Trees	-
A P R I L	21	Blue Blood	X Japan	-
A P R I L	24	Mr. Music Head	Adrian Belew	-
A P R I L	24	Blast	Holly Johnson	Debut
A P R I L	24	Blue Murder	Blue Murder	Debut
A P R I L	24	Full Moon Fever	Tom Petty	-
A P R I L	25	Through the Storm	Aretha Franklin	-
A P R I L	26	Best Wishes	Cro-Mags	-
A P R I L	26	Repeat Offender	Richard Marx	-
A P R I L	?	1,000 Hours	Green Day	EP
A P R I L	?	The Black Swan	The Triffids	-
A P R I L	?	City Streets	Carole King	-
A P R I L	?	Counterpoint	In the Nursery	Compilation
A P R I L	?	For Ladies Only	Killdozer	-
A P R I L	?	Free	Concrete Blonde	-
A P R I L	?	Gashed Senses & Crossfire	Front Line Assembly	-
A P R I L	?	The Headless Children	W.A.S.P.	-
A P R I L	?	Stuck in Wonderamaland	Dramarama	-
A P R I L	?	Slippery When Ill	The Vandals	-
A P R I L	?	What's That Noise?	Coldcut	Debut
M A Y	1	Will the Circle Be Unbroken: Volume Two	Nitty Gritty Dirt Band	-
M A Y	2	Barry Manilow	Barry Manilow	-
M A Y	2	Disintegration	The Cure	-
M A Y	2	Killin' Time	Clint Black	-
M A Y	2	On Land and in the Sea	Cardiacs	-
M A Y	2	Something Inside So Strong	Kenny Rogers	-
M A Y	2	The Stone Roses	The Stone Roses	Debut
M A Y	2	Street Fighting Years	Simple Minds	-
M A Y	2	Sweet Sixteen	Reba McEntire	-
M A Y	2	This Is the Day...This Is the Hour...This Is This!	Pop Will Eat Itself	-
M A Y	2	Yo Frankie	Dion	-
M A Y	2	Workbook	Bob Mould	Debut
M A Y	4	Blind Man's Zoo	10,000 Maniacs	-
M A Y	8	A Night To Remember	Cyndi Lauper	-
M A Y	8	Badlands	Badlands	-
M A Y	8	Good to Be Back	Natalie Cole	-
M A Y	8	In a Sentimental Mood	Dr. John	-
M A Y	8	Junta	Phish	sold at concerts in 1988
M A Y	8	Kite	Kirsty MacColl	-
M A Y	9	Big Daddy	John Mellencamp	-
M A Y	9	Dangerous Toys	Dangerous Toys	-
M A Y	9	Kaleidoscope World	Swing Out Sister	-
M A Y	11	Eat the Heat	Accept	-
M A Y	12	Altars of Madness	Morbid Angel	Debut
M A Y	12	Dress	TM Network	Remix album
M A Y	15	The Burning World	Swans	-
M A Y	15	Mind Bomb	The The	-
M A Y	15	Ten Good Reasons	Jason Donovan	-
M A Y	16	Slowly We Rot	Obituary	-
M A Y	16	Youngest in Charge	Special Ed	-
M A Y	17	Cycles	The Doobie Brothers	-
M A Y	18	Nearly Human	Todd Rundgren	-
M A Y	21	Off the Lock	B'z	-
M A Y	22	The Miracle	Queen	-
M A Y	22	Tin Machine	Tin Machine	-
M A Y	22	The Works	Nik Kershaw	-
M A Y	22	Life Is a Dance: The Remix Project	Chaka Khan	Remix album
M A Y	23	2300 Jackson Street	Jacksons	-
M A Y	23	Brain Drain	Ramones	-
M A Y	23	The Warmer Side of Cool	Wang Chung	-
M A Y	28	Energy	Operation Ivy	-
M A Y	30	The Other Side of the Mirror	Stevie Nicks	-
M A Y	30	White Limozeen	Dolly Parton	-
M A Y	30	Hope and Despair	Edwyn Collins	Debut solo
M A Y	?	Dung 4	Inspiral Carpets	Demo
M A Y	?	I Enjoy Being a Girl	Phranc	-
M A Y	?	A Peacetime Boom	The Boom	-
M A Y	?	Cloudland	Pere Ubu	-
M A Y	?	Invasion Live	Magnum	Live
M A Y	?	It's Beginning To And Back Again	Wire	-
J U N E	1	Agent Orange	Sodom	-
J U N E	2	Avalon Sunset	Van Morrison	-
J U N E	5	Flowers in the Dirt	Paul McCartney	-
J U N E	5	Passion	Peter Gabriel	-
J U N E	5	Big Game	White Lion	-
J U N E	5	Raw Like Sushi	Neneh Cherry	Debut
J U N E	5	One Night of Sin	Joe Cocker	-
J U N E	5	Babeti Soukous	Tabu Ley Seigneur Rochereau and Afrisa International Orchestra	-
J U N E	6	Workin' Overtime	Diana Ross	-
J U N E	6	World in Motion	Jackson Browne	-
J U N E	6	No More Mr. Nice Guy	Gang Starr	Debut
J U N E	8	Nights Like This	Stacey Q	-
J U N E	9	Walking with a Panther	LL Cool J	-
J U N E	12	Big Tyme	Heavy D & The Boyz	-
J U N E	12	Ghostbusters II	Various Artists	Soundtrack
J U N E	12	Trouble in Angel City	Lion	-
J U N E	13	Heart Shaped World	Chris Isaak	-
J U N E	13	In Step	Stevie Ray Vaughan and Double Trouble	-
J U N E	13	DC Talk	DC Talk	-
J U N E	13	What You Don't Know	Exposé	-
J U N E	15	Bleach	Nirvana	Debut
J U N E	15	Dig?	Bill Bruford's Earthworks	-
J U N E	15	The Offspring	The Offspring	Debut; re-released in 1995
J U N E	19	Off to See the Lizard	Jimmy Buffett	-
J U N E	19	Protest Songs	Prefab Sprout	-
J U N E	19	Extreme Aggression	Kreator	-
J U N E	19	Riders go Commercial	Riders in the Sky	-
J U N E	20	Anderson Bruford Wakeman Howe	Anderson Bruford Wakeman Howe	-
J U N E	20	Batman	Prince	Soundtrack
J U N E	20	The Joke's on You	Excel	-
J U N E	20	Mr. Big	Mr. Big	Debut
J U N E	20	The Real Thing	Faith No More	-
J U N E	21	Looking for Freedom	David Hasselhoff	-
J U N E	26	All or Nothing	Milli Vanilli	-
J U N E	26	Automatic	Sharpe & Numan	-
J U N E	26	Bad English	Bad English	-
J U N E	26	Be Yourself	Patti LaBelle	-
J U N E	26	Seminal Live	The Fall	–
J U N E	26	Soul Provider	Michael Bolton	-
J U N E	27	Cosmic Thing	The B-52s	-
J U N E	27	Danger Danger	Danger Danger	-
J U N E	27	The End of the Innocence	Don Henley	-
J U N E	27	Good Evening	Marshall Crenshaw	-
J U N E	27	Gretchen Goes to Nebraska	King's X	-
J U N E	27	The Iron Man: The Musical by Pete Townshend	Pete Townshend	-
J U N E	27	Rockland	Kim Mitchell	-
J U N E	28	Ain't Gonna Cry	Juice Newton	-
J U N E	?	Dum-Dum	The Vaselines	-
J U N E	?	Magnum Cum Louder	Hoodoo Gurus	-
J U N E	?	Margin Walker	Fugazi	-
J U N E	?	Two Highways	Alison Krauss & Union Station	-
J U N E	?	Velveteen	Transvision Vamp	-

=== July–September ===
Release		Album	Artist	Notes
J U L Y	4	Ghetto Music: The Blueprint of Hip Hop	Boogie Down Productions	-
J U L Y	7	Tender Lover	Babyface	-
J U L Y	10	Heart of Stone	Cher	-
J U L Y	10	Cuts Both Ways	Gloria Estefan	-
J U L Y	10	Earth Moving	Mike Oldfield	-
J U L Y	10	Horrified	Repulsion	-
J U L Y	10	Waking Hours	Del Amitri	-
J U L Y	12	Blood, Sweat, and No Tears	Sick of It All	Debut
J U L Y	17	The Twelve Commandments of Dance	London Boys	Debut
J U L Y	18	UHF – Original Motion Picture Soundtrack and Other Stuff	"Weird Al" Yankovic	Soundtrack
J U L Y	21	The Ocean Blue	The Ocean Blue	Debut
J U L Y	25	Paul's Boutique	Beastie Boys	-
J U L Y	25	Trash	Alice Cooper	-
J U L Y	25	Unfinished Business	EPMD	-
J U L Y	26	Bread & Circus	Toad the Wet Sprocket	Debut
J U L Y	31	Can't Look Away	Trevor Rabin	-
J U L Y	?	Peace and Love	The Pogues	-
J U L Y	?	Tweez	Slint	Debut
A U G U S T	1	Self-Inflicted Aerial Nostalgia	Guided by Voices	-
A U G U S T	1	No One Can Do It Better	The D.O.C.	Debut
A U G U S T	2	The Cinderella Theory	George Clinton	-
A U G U S T	7	Mick Jones	Mick Jones	-
A U G U S T	8	Love Among the Cannibals	Starship	-
A U G U S T	8	Practice What You Preach	Testament	-
A U G U S T	8	Storms	Nanci Griffith	-
A U G U S T	14	Kix Brooks	Kix Brooks	-
A U G U S T	14	Now That's What I Call Music 15 (UK series)	Various Artists	-
A U G U S T	15	Christmas in America	Kenny Rogers	Christmas
A U G U S T	15	No Blue Thing	Ray Lynch	-
A U G U S T	16	Mother's Milk	Red Hot Chili Peppers	-
A U G U S T	16	Special	The Temptations	-
A U G U S T	17	The Death of a Dictionary	Public Affection	Band changed name to Live
A U G U S T	21	Rock Island	Jethro Tull	-
A U G U S T	21	Conspiracy	King Diamond	-
A U G U S T	21	Sacred Heart	Shakespear's Sister	Debut
A U G U S T	22	After 7	After 7	-
A U G U S T	22	Cocked & Loaded	L.A. Guns	-
A U G U S T	22	Devil's Night Out	The Mighty Mighty Bosstones	-
A U G U S T	22	Enuff Z'nuff	Enuff Z'nuff	Debut
A U G U S T	22	Jefferson Airplane	Jefferson Airplane	-
A U G U S T	22	Perfect Symmetry	Fates Warning	-
A U G U S T	24	The Man Is Back!	Barry White	-
A U G U S T	24	Niki Nana	Yanni	-
A U G U S T	28	Adeva!	Adeva	-
A U G U S T	28	Still Cruisin'	The Beach Boys	-
A U G U S T	29	Steel Wheels	The Rolling Stones	-
A U G U S T	29	Lukather	Steve Lukather	Solo Debut
A U G U S T	29	Different	Thomas Anders	Debut; Germany
A U G U S T	29	Escape from Havana	Mellow Man Ace	Debut
A U G U S T	29	Last of the Runaways	Giant	Debut
A U G U S T	?	Penikufesin	Anthrax	EP
A U G U S T	?	Return of the Ugly	Bad Manners	-
S E P T E M B E R	1	Dr. Feelgood	Mötley Crüe	-
S E P T E M B E R	1	13 Songs	Fugazi	Compilation
S E P T E M B E R	1	Jaya	Jaya	Debut
S E P T E M B E R	1	Water in Time and Space	Susumu Hirasawa	Debut
S E P T E M B E R	4	Sleeping with the Past	Elton John	-
S E P T E M B E R	4	Love and Rockets	Love and Rockets	-
S E P T E M B E R	4	Primal Scream	Primal Scream	-
S E P T E M B E R	5	Alice in Hell	Annihilator	-
S E P T E M B E R	5	Key Lime Pie	Camper Van Beethoven	-
S E P T E M B E R	5	Louder Than Love	Soundgarden	-
S E P T E M B E R	5	Megatop Phoenix	Big Audio Dynamite	-
S E P T E M B E R	5	S&M Airlines	NOFX	-
S E P T E M B E R	5	Stone Cold Rhymin'	Young MC	-
S E P T E M B E R	5	Up to Here	The Tragically Hip	-
S E P T E M B E R	5	Wake Me When It's Over	Faster Pussycat	-
S E P T E M B E R	11	We Too Are One	Eurythmics	UK
S E P T E M B E R	11	Pump	Aerosmith	-
S E P T E M B E R	11	Brave and Crazy	Melissa Etheridge	-
S E P T E M B E R	12	Floating into the Night	Julee Cruise	-
S E P T E M B E R	12	Bound By the Beauty	Jane Siberry	-
S E P T E M B E R	12	Oh Mercy	Bob Dylan	-
S E P T E M B E R	14	Quickness	Bad Brains	-
S E P T E M B E R	18	Foreign Affair	Tina Turner	-
S E P T E M B E R	18	Janet Jackson's Rhythm Nation 1814	Janet Jackson	-
S E P T E M B E R	18	Heart Like a Sky	Spandau Ballet	-
S E P T E M B E R	18	No More Color	Coroner	-
S E P T E M B E R	18	Oh Mercy	Bob Dylan	-
S E P T E M B E R	18	Allroy's Revenge	ALL	-
S E P T E M B E R	19	Let Love Rule	Lenny Kravitz	-
S E P T E M B E R	19	It's a Big Daddy Thing	Big Daddy Kane	-
S E P T E M B E R	19	Merry, Merry Christmas	New Kids on the Block	Christmas
S E P T E M B E R	19	Sound + Vision	David Bowie	Box Set
S E P T E M B E R	25	Here Today, Tomorrow Next Week!	The Sugarcubes	-
S E P T E M B E R	25	Seasons End	Marillion	-
S E P T E M B E R	25	The Seeds of Love	Tears for Fears	-
S E P T E M B E R	26	Big Trash	Thompson Twins	-
S E P T E M B E R	26	Def, Dumb and Blonde	Deborah Harry	US
S E P T E M B E R	26	Flying Cowboys	Rickie Lee Jones	-
S E P T E M B E R	26	Laughter	The Mighty Lemon Drops	-
S E P T E M B E R	26	No Holdin' Back	Randy Travis	-
S E P T E M B E R	?	The Freed Man	Sebadoh	-
S E P T E M B E R	?	The Healer	John Lee Hooker	-
S E P T E M B E R	?	L'eau rouge	The Young Gods	-
S E P T E M B E R	?	The Mekons Rock 'n Roll	The Mekons	-
S E P T E M B E R	?	Soldier of Fortune	Loudness	-
S E P T E M B E R	?	Tempted and Tried	Steeleye Span	-

=== October–December ===
Release		Album	Artist	Notes
O C T O B E R	2	Freedom	Neil Young	-
O C T O B E R	2	Hup	The Wonder Stuff	-
O C T O B E R	2	Liquidizer	Jesus Jones	-
O C T O B E R	3	Crossroads	Tracy Chapman	-
O C T O B E R	3	Cry Like a Rainstorm, Howl Like the Wind	Linda Ronstadt featuring Aaron Neville	-
O C T O B E R	3	Handle with Care	Nuclear Assault	-
O C T O B E R	3	If It Don't Kill You, It Just Makes You Stronger	Bruce Willis	-
O C T O B E R	3	Petra Praise: The Rock Cries Out	Petra	-
O C T O B E R	3	Runaway Horses	Belinda Carlisle	-
O C T O B E R	3	Shocker	Various Artists	Soundtrack
O C T O B E R	5	More to This Life	Steven Curtis Chapman	-
O C T O B E R	7	UAIOE	KMFDM	-
O C T O B E R	9	Automatic	The Jesus and Mary Chain	-
O C T O B E R	9	Coming In for the Kill	Climie Fisher	-
O C T O B E R	9	Enjoy Yourself	Kylie Minogue	-
O C T O B E R	9	Paradise Circus	The Lilac Time	-
O C T O B E R	9	Results	Liza Minnelli	-
O C T O B E R	9	Scar	Lush	Mini Album
O C T O B E R	10	The Biz Never Sleeps	Biz Markie	-
O C T O B E R	10	The Iceberg/Freedom of Speech... Just Watch What You Say!	Ice-T	-
O C T O B E R	10	Save Yourself	McAuley Schenker Group	-
O C T O B E R	10	Thrash Zone	D.R.I.	-
O C T O B E R	10	Trial by Fire: Live in Leningrad	Yngwie Malmsteen	Live
O C T O B E R	13	Nothingface	Voivod	-
O C T O B E R	13	Trouble Walkin'	Ace Frehley	-
O C T O B E R	13	The Years of Decay	Overkill	-
O C T O B E R	16	Best of Dark Horse 1976–1989	George Harrison	Compilation
O C T O B E R	16	Controlled by Hatred/Feel Like Shit... Déjà Vu	Suicidal Tendencies	Compilation
O C T O B E R	16	Def, Dumb & Blonde	Deborah Harry	-
O C T O B E R	16	Hats	The Blue Nile	US
O C T O B E R	16	Hot in the Shade	Kiss	-
O C T O B E R	16	Long Hard Look	Lou Gramm	-
O C T O B E R	16	Scarlet and Other Stories	All About Eve	-
O C T O B E R	16	Selena	Selena	-
O C T O B E R	16	The Sensual World	Kate Bush	-
O C T O B E R	16	Simple Man	Charlie Daniels	-
O C T O B E R	16	Steady On	Shawn Colvin	-
O C T O B E R	16	The Time	Bros	-
O C T O B E R	16	We're in This Together	Low Profile	-
O C T O B E R	16	Wild!	Erasure	-
O C T O B E R	20	Pretty Hate Machine	Nine Inch Nails	Debut
O C T O B E R	23	Welcome to the Beautiful South	The Beautiful South	-
O C T O B E R	23	Storm Front	Billy Joel	-
O C T O B E R	23	Neither Fish nor Flesh	Terence Trent D'Arby	-
O C T O B E R	23	Getahead	Curiosity Killed the Cat	-
O C T O B E R	23	Michel'le	Michel'le	-
O C T O B E R	23	On Fire	Galaxie 500	-
O C T O B E R	23	Word Power	Divine Styler	Debut
O C T O B E R	24	11	The Smithereens	-
O C T O B E R	24	Come Together As One	Will Downing	-
O C T O B E R	24	Follow the Blind	Blind Guardian	-
O C T O B E R	24	Strange Angels	Laurie Anderson	-
O C T O B E R	26	Zig Zag	The Hooters	-
O C T O B E R	28	Realm of Chaos – Slaves to Darkness	Bolt Thrower	-
O C T O B E R	30	The Road to Hell	Chris Rea	-
O C T O B E R	30	Flying in a Blue Dream	Joe Satriani	-
O C T O B E R	30	Holding Back the River	Wet Wet Wet	-
O C T O B E R	30	Rite Time	Can	-
O C T O B E R	30	Songs for the Poor Man	Remmy Ongala & Orchestre Super Matimila	-
O C T O B E R	30	Stronger	Cliff Richard	-
O C T O B E R	30	You, Me and the Alarm Clock	John Bramwell (as Johnny Dangerously)	EP
O C T O B E R	31	And in This Corner...	DJ Jazzy Jeff & the Fresh Prince	-
O C T O B E R	31	Book of Days	The Psychedelic Furs	-
O C T O B E R	31	Built to Last	Grateful Dead	-
O C T O B E R	31	Bulletproof Heart	Grace Jones	-
O C T O B E R	31	Can't Fight Fate	Taylor Dayne	-
O C T O B E R	?	The English Disease	Barmy Army	-
O C T O B E R	?	i	A.R. Kane	-
O C T O B E R	?	Piretos tou erota	Vicky Leandros	Greece
N O V E M B E R	1	Mudhoney	Mudhoney	Debut
N O V E M B E R	1	Ozma	Melvins	-
N O V E M B E R	2	No Control	Bad Religion	-
N O V E M B E R	6	Journeyman	Eric Clapton	-
N O V E M B E R	6	Boomerang	The Creatures	-
N O V E M B E R	7	Slip of the Tongue	Whitesnake	US
N O V E M B E R	7	All Hail the Queen	Queen Latifah	-
N O V E M B E R	7	Done by the Forces of Nature	Jungle Brothers	-
N O V E M B E R	10	The Cactus Album	3rd Bass	-
N O V E M B E R	10	West Textures	Robert Earl Keen	-
N O V E M B E R	13	Best of Rockers 'n' Ballads	Scorpions	Compilation
N O V E M B E R	13	Me and a Monkey on the Moon	Felt	-
N O V E M B E R	13	Streetcleaner	Godflesh	Debut
N O V E M B E R	13	World Downfall	Terrorizer	Debut
N O V E M B E R	13	You Can't Do That on Stage Anymore, Vol. 3	Frank Zappa	Live
N O V E M B E R	14	The Mind Is a Terrible Thing to Taste	Ministry	-
N O V E M B E R	20	...But Seriously	Phil Collins	-
N O V E M B E R	20	Perfect Remedy	Status Quo	-
N O V E M B E R	20	Affection	Lisa Stansfield	Europe
N O V E M B E R	20	Now That's What I Call Music 16 (UK series)	Various Artists	-
N O V E M B E R	20	Rabies	Skinny Puppy	-
N O V E M B E R	21	Beauty	Ryuichi Sakamoto	-
N O V E M B E R	21	Presto	Rush	US
N O V E M B E R	21	Back on the Block	Quincy Jones	-
N O V E M B E R	21	The Incredible Base	Rob Base and DJ E-Z Rock	-
N O V E M B E R	21	Kenny G Live	Kenny G	Live
N O V E M B E R	24	A Black & White Night Live	Roy Orbison and Friends	Live
N O V E M B E R	27	Labour of Love II	UB40	-
N O V E M B E R	27	Ghost Nation	Hunters & Collectors	-
N O V E M B E R	27	Pump Up the Jam	Technotronic	-
N O V E M B E R	?	Consuming Impulse	Pestilence	-
N O V E M B E R	?	I Remember Mama	Shirley Caesar	-
N O V E M B E R	?	Speaking of Dreams	Joan Baez	-
N O V E M B E R	?	Suck on This	Primus	Live
D E C E M B E R	1	Change the Weather	Underworld	-
D E C E M B E R	1	Gutter Ballet	Savatage	-
D E C E M B E R	1	Never Picture Perfect	Rich Mullins	-
D E C E M B E R	4	Ninety	808 State	-
D E C E M B E R	4	Symphonies of Sickness	Carcass	-
D E C E M B E R	9	Digitalian is Eating Breakfast	Tetsuya Komuro	Debut
D E C E M B E R	11	Monty Python Sings	Monty Python	Compilation
D E C E M B E R	17	Boys in Heat	Britny Fox	-
D E C E M B E R	19	Deep	Peter Murphy	US
D E C E M B E R	?	Hallelujah	Happy Mondays	EP
D E C E M B E R	?	Post-Mersh Vol. 3	Minutemen	Compilation
D E C E M B E R	?	Surprise	Better Than Ezra	Cassette only
D E C E M B E R	?	The Symphony Sessions	Tom Cochrane & Red Rider	Final; Live

=== Release date unknown ===
- Long Stem Rant – Giant Sand
- A Word from the Wise – Pennywise (EP)
- Al Denson – Al Denson
- All Aboard the Mind Train – The Modern Art
- Animal Logic - Animal Logic
- At Peace – Jade Warrior
- Big Talk – Edin-Ådahl
- Blow – Red Lorry Yellow Lorry
- Bringing It Back Home – The Clark Sisters
- Brotherly Love – Daniel Winans
- Cantemos Juntos – Lynda Thomas (EP)
- Christmas Is... – Johnny Maestro & the Brooklyn Bridge
- Century Flower – Shelleyan Orphan
- The Complete Sham 69 Live – Sham 69
- Cyborgs Revisited – Simply Saucer
- Don't Stop the Night – Momus
- Door Into Summer - Jacob's Trouble
- Down on the River - John Hartford
- Earwig – Blake Babies
- Face of Despair – Mortal Sin
- Fight the Power... Live! – Public Enemy – (live, released on VHS)
- First Watch – Guardian
- Freedom – White Heart
- Get Yer Jujus Out – Chief Commander Ebenezer Obey & His Inter-Reformers Band
- God, Time and Causality – John Fahey
- Hard Volume – Rollins Band
- Helter Stupid – Negativland
- Here Come the Snakes – Green on Red
- Hope and Despair – Edwyn Collins
- Human Soul – Graham Parker
- I Can See You – Black Flag
- Imagine That - Dennis Seaton
- Immigrant's Daughter – Margaret Becker
- In Your Face – Shout
- Innocent Blood – REZ
- Irène Schweizer & Andrew Cyrille - Irène Schweizer and Andrew Cyrille
- It's a Jungle Out There! - Mastedon
- Joggers and Smoggers – The Ex
- Knights of Heaven – Leviticus
- Les Rythmes Automatiques (fr) – Telex
- Liberation – Bunny Wailer
- Life in Exile After Abdication – Moe Tucker
- Long Way From Paradise – Allies
- Master's Command – Sacred Warrior
- Matrice - Gérard Manset
- Michigan Rain – Gregg Alexander
- Modern – Hijokaidan
- Mother Nature's Kitchen – Kevin McDermott
- Night of Rage – Kraut
- No More Blues – Susannah McCorkle
- No Room in the Middle – Greg X. Volz
- Novice - Alain Bashung
- Once We Were Scum, Now We Are God – No
- Out of the Darkness – Bloodgood
- Outdoor Elvis – The Swirling Eddies
- The Pledge – DeGarmo and Key
- Powertrip – Ludichrist (final album)
- Prime 5 – Ween
- The Prophets – Alpha Blondy
- Rasta Souvenir – Manu Dibango
- Sittin' Pretty – The Pastels
- Searchlight – Runrig
- Silence is Madness – Bride
- Smash – One Bad Pig
- Soulforce Revolution – 7 Seconds
- State of Control – Barren Cross
- Strange Cargo – David Van Tieghem
- Start Today – Gorilla Biscuits
- Stolen Wishes – Shoes
- Strong Medicine – Bryan Duncan
- Sue – Frazier Chorus
- Symphony in Effect – Maestro Fresh-Wes
- Too Long in the Wasteland - James McMurtry
- Tragedy Again – D.I.
- The Way Home – Russ Taff
- This Time Around – Green on Red
- Voodoo – Dirty Dozen Brass Band
- Western Shadows – Carole Laure
- Words for the Dying – John Cale
- Wrong – Nomeansno

== Biggest hit singles ==
The following songs achieved the highest chart positions in the charts of 1989.

#	Artist	Title	Year	Country	Chart Entries
1	Madonna	Like a Prayer	1989	(United States)	UK 1 - Mar 1989 (13 weeks), US Billboard 1 - Mar 1989 (16 weeks), US CashBox 1 of 1989, Japan (Tokyo) 1 - Mar 1989 (18 weeks), Finland 1 for 3 weeks - Mar 1989, Switzerland 1 - Mar 1989 (17 weeks), Norway 1 - Mar 1989 (16 weeks), Poland 1 - Apr 1989 (26 weeks), Belgium 1 - Mar 1989 (12 weeks), Italy 1 for 9 weeks - Apr 1989, Eire 1 for 2 weeks - Mar 1989, Canada RPM 1 for 4 weeks - Apr 1989, Canada 1 of 1989, New Zealand 1 for 2 weeks - Apr 1989, Australia 1 for 4 weeks - Apr 1989, Europe 1 for 12 weeks - Mar 1989, Holland 2 - Mar 1989 (11 weeks), Austria 2 - Apr 1989 (5 months), Australia 2 of 1989, Germany 2 - Mar 1989 (5 months), ODK Germany 2 - Mar 1989 (25 weeks) (11 weeks in top 10), MTV Video of the year 1989 (Nominated), US Platinum (certified by RIAA in May 1989), France 4 - Mar 1989 (2 weeks), Germany Gold (certified by BMieV in 1989), US Radio 5 of 1989 (peak 1 10 weeks), Italy 5 of 1989, POP 5 of 1989, Switzerland 6 of 1989, ARC 8 of 1989 (peak 1 12 weeks), US BB 25 of 1989, Scrobulate 33 of pop, Sweden 36 - Aug 2009 (1 week), Brazil 38 of 1989, Europe 49 of the 1980s (1989), nuTsie 65 of 1980s, Germany 96 of the 1980s (peak 2 15 weeks), France (InfoDisc) 113 of the 1980s (peak 1, 27 weeks, 478k sales estimated, 1989), OzNet 161, Rolling Stone 300, Acclaimed 629 (1989), RYM 13 of 1989
2	Phil Collins	Another Day in Paradise	1989	(United Kingdom)	US Billboard 1 - Nov 1989 (17 weeks), US Radio 1 of 1989 (peak 1 11 weeks), Japan (Tokyo) 1 - Nov 1989 (20 weeks), Sweden 1 - Nov 1989 (8 weeks), Finland 1 for 2 weeks - Nov 1989, Switzerland 1 - Nov 1989 (21 weeks), Norway 1 - Nov 1989 (15 weeks), Poland 1 - Nov 1989 (23 weeks), Belgium 1 - Nov 1989 (14 weeks), Germany 1 - Jan 1990 (5 months), ODK Germany 1 - Nov 1989 (31 weeks) (10 weeks at number 1) (15 weeks in top 10), Canada RPM 1 for 8 weeks - Dec 1989, Europe 1 for 5 weeks - Jan 1990, Germany 1 for 10 weeks - Dec 1989, Spain 1 for 1 week - Jan 1990, Grammy in 1990, Brit best song 1990, UK 2 - Nov 1989 (11 weeks), ARC 2 of 1989 (peak 1 13 weeks), Holland 2 - Oct 1989 (12 weeks), Austria 2 - Dec 1989 (5 months), Brazil 3 of 1990, Italy 3 of 1990, US Gold (certified by RIAA in Dec 1989), Germany Gold (certified by BMieV in 1990), Japan (Osaku) 5 of 1990 (peak 1 22 weeks), US BB 7 of 1990, France 9 - Nov 1989 (1 week), Switzerland 11 of 1990, POP 21 of 1989, Canada 23 of 1990, Europe 60 of the 1980s (1989), Scrobulate 67 of ballad, Billboard 50th song 86, 55th Billboard 100 96 (1989), Germany 195 of the 1990s (peak 1 10 weeks), OzNet 214, UK Silver (certified by BPI in Nov 1989), RYM 133 of 1989
3	Fine Young Cannibals	She Drives Me Crazy	1988	(United Kingdom)	US Billboard 1 - Jan 1989 (23 weeks), Austria 1 - Mar 1989 (5 months), Canada RPM 1 for 1 week - Apr 1989, New Zealand 1 for 5 weeks - Mar 1989, Australia 1 for 5 weeks - Mar 1989, Germany 2 - Feb 1989 (4 months), ODK Germany 2 - Jan 1989 (22 weeks) (13 weeks in top 10), Grammy in 1989 (Nominated), MTV Video of the year 1989 (Nominated), Holland 3 - Jan 1989 (10 weeks), Switzerland 3 - Feb 1989 (18 weeks), Japan (Tokyo) 4 - Feb 1989 (19 weeks), US Gold (certified by RIAA in Apr 1989), Germany Gold (certified by BMieV in 1989), UK 5 - Jan 1989 (13 weeks), Belgium 5 - Feb 1989 (11 weeks), Australia 5 of 1989, Norway 6 - Apr 1989 (4 weeks), Switzerland 7 of 1989, France 9 - Dec 1988 (1 week), Poland 9 - Mar 1989 (9 weeks), POP 9 of 1989, ARC 11 of 1989 (peak 1 14 weeks), Canada 11 of 1989, US CashBox 12 of 1989, Sweden 13 - Feb 1989 (4 weeks), US BB 18 of 1989, US Radio 19 of 1989 (peak 1 10 weeks), Brazil 29 of 1989, KROQ 31 of 1989, Holland free40 39 of 1989, Italy 47 of 1989, Germany 99 of the 1980s (peak 2 15 weeks), OzNet 134, Acclaimed 672 (1989), RYM 190 of 1988
4	Roxette	The Look	1989	(Sweden)	US Billboard 1 - Feb 1989 (19 weeks), Sweden 1 - Jan 1989 (11 weeks), Finland 1 for 1 week - May 1989, Switzerland 1 - Apr 1989 (27 weeks), Norway 1 - Mar 1989 (18 weeks), Germany 1 - Apr 1989 (5 months), ODK Germany 1 - Apr 1989 (24 weeks) (4 weeks at number 1) (13 weeks in top 10), New Zealand 1 for 3 weeks - May 1989, Australia 1 for 5 weeks - Jul 1989, Europe 1 for 2 weeks - Jun 1989, Germany 1 for 5 weeks - May 1989, Japan (Tokyo) 2 - Mar 1989 (18 weeks), Holland 2 - Mar 1989 (12 weeks), Austria 2 - May 1989 (7 months), Switzerland 2 of 1989, Belgium 2 - Apr 1989 (12 weeks), Australia 3 of 1989, France 4 - Apr 1989 (2 weeks), US Gold (certified by RIAA in Apr 1989), US CashBox 6 of 1989, UK 7 - Apr 1989 (13 weeks), Poland 8 - Apr 1989 (17 weeks), Italy 9 of 1989, Canada 10 of 1989, US Radio 14 of 1989 (peak 1 9 weeks), US BB 17 of 1989, Germany 30 of the 1980s (peak 1 18 weeks), Brazil 35 of 1989, POP 39 of 1989, ARC 41 of 1989 (peak 1 12 weeks), OzNet 567, RYM 94 of 1989
5	The Bangles	Eternal Flame	1989	(United States)	UK 1 - Feb 1989 (20 weeks), US Billboard 1 - Feb 1989 (19 weeks), Holland 1 - Mar 1989 (16 weeks), Sweden 1 - Apr 1989 (10 weeks), Norway 1 - May 1989 (16 weeks), Belgium 1 - Apr 1989 (15 weeks), Australia 1 of 1989, Eire 1 for 3 weeks - Apr 1989, Australia 1 for 1 week - Jun 1989, Japan (Tokyo) 2 - Feb 1989 (22 weeks), Switzerland 2 - May 1989 (19 weeks), Austria 3 - May 1989 (5 months), ODK Germany 4 - May 1989 (22 weeks) (10 weeks in top 10), US Gold (certified by RIAA in Apr 1989), UK Gold (certified by BPI in May 1989), Switzerland 5 of 1989, Germany 5 - May 1989 (4 months), US CashBox 7 of 1989, France 10 - Feb 1989 (1 week), Brazil 10 of 1989, US Radio 21 of 1989 (peak 1 8 weeks), POP 25 of 1989, Canada 26 of 1989, Europe 27 of the 1980s (1988), US BB 32 of 1989, ARC 33 of 1989 (peak 1 13 weeks), Scrobulate 70 of 80s, Holland free40 97 of 1989, OzNet 141, Germany 196 of the 1980s (peak 4 14 weeks), UKMIX 649, RYM 73 of 1989

== Top 40 Chart hit singles ==
Song title	Artist(s)	Release date(s)	US	UK	Highest chart position	Other Chart Performance(s)
"(It's Just) The Way That You Love Me"	Paula Abdul	September 1989	3	74	3 (US Billboard Hot 100)	See chart performance entry
"18 and Life"	Skid Row	June 1989	4	12	4 (US)	See chart performance entry
"À la même heure dans deux ans"	Elsa Lunghini	April 1989	n/a	n/a	7 (France)	5 (France Airplay Chart) – 26 (Québec) – 29 (Europe) – 46 (European Airplay Top 50)
"After All"	Cher & Peter Cetera	February 1989	6	84	1 (US Adult Contemporary – Billboard)	See chart performance entry
"Ain't Nobody Better"	Inner City	April 1989	n/a	10	1 (US Hot Dance Club Play – Billboard)	See chart performance entry
"Ain't Nobody" (Remix)	Chaka Khan & Rufus	June 1989	n/a	6	6 (UK)	9 (West Germany)
"All Around the World"	Lisa Stansfield	October 1989	3	1	1 (9 Countries)	See chart performance entry
"All I Want Is You"	U2	June 1989	83	4	1 (Ireland)	See chart performance entry
"All She Wants Is"	Duran Duran	December 1988	22	9	2 (Italy)	1 (European Dance charts) – 1 (Billboard Hot Dance Club Play) – 1 (European Dance charts) – 24 (Billboard Modern Rock Tracks) – 74 (Australia)
"Americanos"	Holly Johnson	March 1989	n/a	4	1 (Austria)	See chart performance entry
"Angelia"	Richard Marx	September 1989	4	45	1 (Canada)	See chart performance entry
"Another Day in Paradise"	Phil Collins	October 1989	1	2	1 (10 Countries)	See chart performance entry
"The Arms of Orion"	Prince & Sheena Easton	October 1989	36	27	13 (Netherlands)	See chart performance entry
"Around My Heart"	Sandra	March 1989	n/a	n/a	11 (Germany)	19 (Switzerland) – 23 (Austria) – 28 (France) – 44 (Europe)
"Atomic City"	Holly Johnson	June 1989	n/a	18	9 (Ireland)	See chart performance entry
"Baby Don't Forget My Number"	Milli Vanilli	January 1989	1	16	1 (United States)	See chart performance entry
"Baby I Don't Care"	Transvision Vamp	March 1989	n/a	6	3 (Scotland)	3 (Australia) - 14 (Ireland) - 24 (Europe)
"Back to Life (However Do You Want Me)"	Soul II Soul	May 1989	4	1	1 (Europe, Holland, Netherlands)	See chart performance entry
"Batdance"	Prince	June 1989	1	2	1 (6 countries)	See chart performance entry
"Bakerman”	Laid Back	1989	n/a	44	1 (Austria)	9 (West Germany) – 10 (Switzerland) – 13 (Sweden) – 20 (Holland) – 27 (Belgium)
"The Beat(en) Generation"	The The	April 1989	n/a	18	4 (New Zealand)	8 (Ireland) - 13 (US Billboard Modern Rock Tracks) - 50 (Australia) - 82 (Germany)
"Bedroom Eyes"	Kate Ceberano	April 1989	n/a	n/a	2 (Australia)	38 (New Zealand)
"Belfast Child"	Simple Minds	February 1989	n/a	1	1 (5 countries)	See chart performance entry
"The Best"	Tina Turner	August 1989	15	5	2 (Austria, Belgium, Canada, Portugal)	See chart performance entry
"The Best of Me"	Cliff Richard	May 1989	n/a	2	2 (Ireland, United Kingdom)	See chart performance entry
"Black Velvet"	Alannah Myles	October 1989	1	2	4 (4 countries)	See chart performance entry
"Blame It on the Boogie"	Big Fun	July 1989	n/a	4	4 (UK Singles Chart)	See chart performance entry
"Blame It on the Rain"	Milli Vanilli	July 1989	1	52	1 (United States)	See chart performance entry
"Blow the House Down"	Living in a Box	June 1989	n/a	10	10 (United Kingdom, Holland)	12 (Belgium, Ireland) – 15 (Sweden) – 26 (Switzerland) – 28 (Germany) – 166 (Australia)
"Blues from a Gun"	The Jesus and Mary Chain	September 1989	n/a	32	1 (US Billboard Modern Rock Tracks)	
"Breakthru"	Queen	June 1989	n/a	7	4 (Netherlands)	See chart performance entry
"Bring Me Edelweiss"	Edelweiss	April 1989	n/a	5	1 (6 countries)	See chart performance entry
"Buffalo Stance"	Neneh Cherry	January 1989	3	3	2 (Greece, Switzerland, West Germany)	See chart performance entry
"Bust a Move"	Young MC	May 1989	7	73	1 (Australia)	See chart performance entry
"Can't Shake the Feeling"	Big Fun	November 1989	n/a	8	7 (Irish Single Charts)	See chart performance entry
"Chained to the Wheel"	The Black Sorrows	January 1989	n/a	n/a	9 (Australia)	42 (New Zealand)
"Cherish"	Madonna	August 1989	2	3	1 (Canada, US Adult Contemporary)	See chart performance entry
"Crying in the Chapel"	Peter Blakeley	November 1989	n/a	n/a	3 (Australia)	7 (New Zealand) - 57 (West Germany)
"Cold Hearted"	Paula Abdul	June 1989	1	46	1 (US Billboard Hot 100)	See chart performance entry
"Cover Girl"	New Kids on the Block	August 1989	2	4	2 (United States)	4 (Canada Top Singles) – 6 (Irish Singles Chart) – 11 (Europe) – 17 (New Zealand) – 22 (Australia)
"Dançando Lambada"	Kaoma	1989	93	62	2 (Finland)	See chart performance entry
"Didn't I (Blow Your Mind)"	New Kids on the Block	November 1989	8	8	8 (US Billboard 100)	6 (Irish Singles Chart) - 17 (Canada Top Singles)
"Dirty Cash (Money Talks)"	The Adventures of Stevie V	December 1989	25	2	1 (Canada, Netherlands)	See chart performance entry
"Dear Jessie"	Madonna	December 1989	n/a	5	3 (Irish Singles Chart)	See chart performance entry
"Do They Know It's Christmas?"	Band Aid II	December 1989	n/a	1	1 (UK, Ireland)	See chart performance entry
"Do You Believe in Shame?"	Duran Duran	April 1989	72	30	14 (Italy)	22 (Finland) - 41 (Dutch Single Top 100) - 88 (Canada)
"The Doctor"	The Doobie Brothers	May 1989	9	73	9 (United States)	1 (US Billboard Modern Rock Tracks) - 14 (Canada) - 31 (US Billboard Adult Contemporary) - 32 (Australia) - 37 (Netherlands)
"Don't Ask Me Why"	Eurythmics	October 1989	40	25	2 (Netherlands)	See chart performance entry
"Don't Close Your Eyes"	Kix	May 1989	11	n/a	16 (US Mainstream Rock [Billboard]	n/a
"Don't Know Much"	Linda Ronstadt and Aaron Neville	September 1989	2	2	1 (Ireland)	See Chart Performance entry
"Don't Wanna Lose You"	Gloria Estefan	June 1989	1	6	1 (US Billboard Hot 100, Canada Adult Contemporary, US Hot Latin Songs [Billboard])	See chart performance entry
"Dr. Feelgood"	Mötley Crüe	September 1989	6	50	11 (New Zealand)	See chart performance entry
"Drama!"	Erasure	September 1989	n/a	4	3 (Denmark)	See chart performance entry
"Dressed for Success"	Roxette	July 1989	14	18	2 (Sweden)	See chart performance entry
"Easy"	Ice MC	1989	n/a	n/a	2 (Spain)	3 (West Germany) - 4 (Switzerland) - 7 (Austria) - 17 (France) - 18 (Europe)
"Electric Youth"	Debbie Gibson	April 1989	11	14	5 (Netherlands)	See chart performance entry
"The End of the Innocence"	Don Henley	June 1989	8	48	3 (Canada)	See chart performance entry
"Especially for You"	Jason Donovan & Kylie Minogue	January 1989	n/a	1	1 (UK, Ireland, Europe)	See chart performance entry
"Eternal Flame"	The Bangles	January 1989	1	1	9 countries	See chart performance entry
"Everlasting Love"	Howard Jones	January 1989	12	62	12 (United States)	1 (US Adult Contemporary) - 19 (US Modern Rock Tracks) - 91 (Australia)
"Every Day (I Love You More)"	Jason Donovan	August 1989	n/a	2	1 (Ireland)	See chart performance entry
"Every Little Step"	Bobby Brown	February 1989	3	6	3 (United States	See chart performance entry
"Express Yourself"	Madonna	May 1989	2	5	4 (countries)	See chart performance entry
"Ferry Cross the Mersey"	Charity record for The Hillsborough Disaster Fund	May 1989	n/a	1	1 (United Kingdom, Ireland)	See chart performance entry
"Fight the Power"	Public Enemy	July 1989	n/a	29	29 (United States)	1 (US Hot Rap Singles (Billboard)) - 3 (US Hot Dance Music/Maxi-Singles Sales (Billboard)) - 20 (US Hot R&B/Hip-Hop Songs (Billboard)) - 30 (Netherlands)
"First Time"	Robin Beck	July 1989	n/a	1	1 (10 countries)	See chart performance entry
"Fisherman's Blues"	The Waterboys	January 1989	n/a	32	13 (Ireland)	3 (US Alternative Airplay [Billboard] - 20 (New Zealand)
"Fools Gold"	The Stone Roses	November 1989	n/a	9	8 (Netherlands)	See chart performance entry
"Forever"	Kiss	January 1989	8	65	8 (United States)	See chart performance entry
"Forever Your Girl"	Paula Abdul	1989	1	24	1 (Canada, United States)	See chart performance entry
"Free Fallin'"	Tom Petty	February 1989	7	59	4 (New Zealand)	See chart performance entry
"French Kiss"	Lil Louis	July 1989	50	2	1 (Netherlands)	See chart performance entry
"Friends"	Jody Watley	April 1989	9	21	8	See chart performance entry
"Funky Cold Medina"	Tone Lōc	March 1989	3	13	3 (New Zealand, United States)	See chart performance entry
"Get On Your Feet"	Gloria Estefan	September 1989	11	23	5 (Ireland)	See chart performance entry
"Girl I'm Gonna Miss You"	Milli Vanilli	July 1989	1	1	1 (6 countries)	See chart performance entry
"Good Life"	Inner City	January 1989	73	4	1 (Finland)	See chart performance entry
"Going Back to My Roots"	FPI Project	November 1989	n/a	9	5 (Austria, West Germany)	See chart performance entry
"Got to Get"	Rob'n'Raz & Leila K	November 1989	48	8	1 (Iceland)	See chart performance entry
"Got to Have Your Love"	Mantronix & Wondress	December 1989	82	4	4 (UK)	See chart performance entry
"Gringo"	Sabrina	July 1989	n/a	95	9 (Finland)	10 (Italy) - 10 (Spain)
"Hand on Your Heart"	Kylie Minogue	April 1989	n/a	1	1 (UK, Ireland)	See chart performance entry
"Hangin' Tough"	New Kids on the Block	July 1989	1	1	1 (UK, US, Ireland)	See chart performance entry
"Harlem Desire"	London Boys	September 1989	n/a	17	6 (Ireland)	n/a
"Have I Told You Lately"	Van Morrison	June 1989	n/a	74	12 (Ireland)	12 (US Billboard Adult Contemporary) - 93 (Australia)
"Heaven"	Warrant	July 1989	2	93	2 (US)	See chart performance entry
"Heaven Help Me"	Deon Estus	April 1989	5	41	4 (Canada)	See chart performance entry
"Hélène"	Roch Voisine	November 1989	n/a	n/a	1 (France, Québec)	3 (Belgium, Norway) - 5 (Europe) - 9 (Canadian RPM Adult Contemporary Chart) - 57 (Canadian RPM Top 100 Chart)
"Help!"	Bananarama & Lananeeneenoonoo	February 1989	n/a	3	2 (Finland, Ireland, Sweden)	See chart performance entry
"Hold Me In Your Arms"	Rick Astley	January 1989	n/a	10	7 (Ireland, Finland)	See chart performance entry
"Homely Girl"	UB40	November 1989	n/a	6	2 (Netherlands)	See chart performance entry
"I Beg Your Pardon"	Kon Kan	February 1989	15	5	3 (Netherlands)	See chart performance entry
"I Don't Wanna Get Hurt"	Donna Summer	May 1989	n/a	7	3 (Ireland)	See chart performance entry
"I Don't Wanna Lose You"	Tina Turner	November 1989	n/a	8	8 (United Kingdom)	See chart performance entry
"I Don't Want a Lover"	Texas	January 1989	77	8	3 (Switzerland)	See chart performance entry
"I Drove All Night"	Cyndi Lauper	April 1989	6	7	6	See chart performance entry
"I Feel the Earth Move"	Martika	August 1989	25	7	2 (Australia)	See chart performance entry
"I Just Don't Have the Heart"	Cliff Richard	August 1989	n/a	3	3 (United Kingdom)	See chart performance entry
"I Like It"	Dino	1989	7	n/a	7 (United States)	See chart performance entry
"I Only Wanna Be With You"	Samantha Fox	January 1989	31	16	1 (Belgium)	See chart performance entry
"I Remember You"	Skid Row	November 1989	6	36	2 (New Zealand)	See chart performance entry
"I Want It All"	Queen	May 1989	50	3	2 (Netherlands)	See chart performance entry
"I Want That Man"	Deborah Harry	September 1989	n/a	13	2 (Australia)	See chart performance entry
"I'd Rather Jack"	The Reynolds Girls	April 1989	n/a	8	6 (Finland, Ireland)	See chart performance entry
"I'll Be Loving You (Forever)"	New Kids on the Block	April 1989	1	5	1 (United States)	See chart performance entry
"I'll Be There for You"	Bon Jovi	April 1989	1	18	1 (United States)	See chart performance entry
"If I Could Turn Back Time"	Cher	July 1989	3	6	1 (Australia)	See chart performance entry
"If Only I Could"	Sydney Youngblood	1989	n/a	3	1 (Belgium)	See chart performance entry
"If Tomorrow Never Comes"	Garth Brooks	August 1989	n/a	1	6 countries	See chart performance entry
"If You Don't Know Me by Now"	Simply Red	March 1989	1	2	1 (Australia, New Zealand, United States)	See chart performance entry
"I'm Every Woman" (Remix)	Chaka Khan	1989	n/a	8	8 (United Kingdom)	See chart performance entry
"In Private"	Dusty Springfield	November 1989	n/a	14	2 (Belgium)	See chart performance entry
"The Invisible Man"	Queen	August 1989	n/a	12	4 (Netherlands)	See chart performance entry
"It's Alright"	Pet Shop Boys	June 1989	n/a	5	3 (West Germany)	See chart performance entry
"It's Only Love"	Simply Red	January 1989	28	12	7 (Ireland)	See chart performance entry
"Jamais nous"	Elsa Lunghini	September 1989	n/a	n/a	10 (France)	15 (Québec) = 41 (Europe)
"Janie's Got a Gun"	Aerosmith	November 1989	4	76	1 (Australia)	See chart performance entry
"Jardins d'enfants"	Début de Soirée	June 1989	n/a	n/a	5 (France)	14 (Finland) - 16 (France) - 24 (Europe)
"Je te survivrai"	Jean-Pierre François	June 1989	n/a	n/a	2 (France)	12 (Europe) - 39 (Québec)
"Johnny, Johnny Come Home"	Avalanche	1989	n/a	n/a	1 (France)	2 (Europe) - 3 (France, Norway)
"Just A Friend"	Biz Markie	1989	9	55	0 (United States)	9 (U.S. Hot Rap Singles - Billboard) - 37 (U.S. Hot R&B/Hip-Hop Singles & Tracks - Billboard) - 66 (Canada)
"Keep On Movin'"	Soul II Soul	March 1989	11	5	5 (United Kingdom)	See chart performance entry
"Kickstart My Heart"	Mötley Crüe	November 1989	27	n/a	27 (United Kingdom)	18 (U.S. Mainstream Rock - Billboard) - 31 (New Zealand) - 34 (Australia)
"Kisses on the Wind"	Neneh Cherry	August 1989	8	20	4 (Finland)	See chart performance entry
"The Look"	Roxette	January 1989	1	7	1 (10 countries)	See chart performance entry
"Looking for Freedom"	David Hasselhoff	January 1989	n/a	n/a	1 (Austria, West Germany, Switzerland)	4 (Europe) - 12 (France) - 18 (Belgium) - 22 (Netherlands - Dutch Top 40) - 31 (Netherlands)
"La Vie la nuit"	Début de Soirée	January 1989	n/a	n/a	2 (France)	3 (Belgium - Wallonia) - 3 (Québec) - 9 (Europe) - 32 (Belgium - Flanders)
"Lambada"	Kaoma	July 1989	46	4	1 (14 countries)	See chart performance entry
"Lay Your Hands on Me"	Bon Jovi	August 1989	7	18	7 (United States)	See chart performance entry
"Lean on You"	Cliff Richard	October 1989	n/a	17	10 (Ireland)	60 (Germany) - 66 (Netherlands)
"Leave a Light On"	Belinda Carlisle	September 1989	11	4	4 (Austria, Ireland, United Kingdom)	See chart performance entry
"Leave Me Alone"	Michael Jackson	February 1989	n/a	2	1 (Greece, Ireland)	See chart performance entry
"Let's Party"	Jive Bunny and the Mastermixers	December 1989	n/a	1	1 (United Kingdom)	See chart performance entry
"Liberian Girl"	Michael Jackson	July 1989	n/a	13	1 (Ireland)	See chart performance entry
"Licence to Kill"	Gladys Knight	May 1989	n/a	6	1 (Sweden)	See chart performance entry
"Like a Prayer"	Madonna	March 1989	1	1	(20 countries)	See chart performance entry
"Like a Yo-Yo"	Sabrina	February 1989	n/a	72	1 (Finland)	2 (Denmark) - 10 (Spain) - 13 (Italy) - 32 (Europe)
"Lily Was Here"	Dave Stewart & Candy Dulfer	1989	11	6	1 (Netherlands)	See chart performance entry
"Listen to Your Heart"	Roxette	October 1989	1	13	1 (United States)	See chart performance entry
"Living in Sin"	Bon Jovi	October 1989	9	35	9 (United States)	9 (U.S. Cash Box Top 100) - 20 (Switzerland) - 37 (U.S.Billboard Album Rock Tracks) - 64 (Australia)
"The Living Years"	Mike + The Mechanics	January 1989	1	2	1 (5 countries)	See chart performance entry
"London Nights"	London Boys	June 1989	n/a	2	1 (Finland)	4 (Ireland) - 6 (Europe) - 9 (Switzerland) - 24 (West Germany)
"Losing My Mind"	Liza Minnelli	August 1989	n/a	6	2 (Ireland)	See chart performance entry
"Lost in Your Eyes"	Debbie Gibson	January 1989	1	34	1 (Canada, United States)	See chart performance entry
"Love in an Elevator"	Aerosmith	August 1989	5	13	5 (United States)	See chart performance entry
"Love in the Natural Way"	Kim Wilde	February 1989	n/a	32	26 (Ireland)	63 (Netherlands [Single Top 100])
"Love is a Shield"	Camouflage	April 1989	n/a	n/a	9 (West Germany)	11 (Austria) - 29 (Switzerland) - 23 (US Alternative Airplay - Billboard) - 35 (US Dance Club Songs - Billboard)
"Love Shack"	The B-52's	June 1989	3	2	1 (Australia, Ireland, New Zealand)	See chart performance entry
"Love Song"	Tesla	August 1989	10	n/a	10 (US)	n/a
"Love Train"	Holly Johnson	November 1989	65	4	4 (UK, West Germany)	See chart performance entry
"Lullaby"	The Cure	August 1989	74	18	2 (US)	See chart performance entry
"Magic Symphony"	Blue System	September 1989	n/a	n/a	21 (Switzerland)	10 (Media Control Charts) - 23 (Austria)
"Manchild"	Neneh Cherry	May 1989	n/a	5	2 (West Germany)	See chart performance entry
"Marina" (Remix '89)	Rocco Granata & The Carnations	1989	n/a	n/a	1 (Belgium, Italy, Germany)	n/a
"Me, Myself and I"	De La Soul	April 1989	34	22	1 (Netherlands)	See chart performance entry
"Me So Horny"	2 Live Crew	January 1989	26	n/a	1 (Netherlands)	See chart performance entry
"The Miracle"	Queen	November 1989	n/a	21	16 (Netherlands - Single Top 100) - 20 (Netherlands - Dutch Top 40)	23 (Ireland) - 28 (Belgium) - 78 (West Germany)
"Mirador"	Johnny Hallyday	June 1989	n/a	n/a	3 (France)	1 (France - Airplay Chart [Am Stations]) - 16 (Europe - Eurochart Hot 100) - 22 (Europe - European Airplay Top 50)
"Miss You Like Crazy"	Natalie Cole	March 1989	7	2	2 (United Kingdom)	See chart performance entry
"Miss You Much"	Janet Jackson	August 1989	1	22	1 (United States)	See chart performance entry
"Mixed Emotions"	The Rolling Stones	August 1989	5	26	1 (Canada)	See chart performance entry
"My Brave Face"	Paul McCartney	May 1989	25	18	1 (Japan)	See chart performance entry
"Name and Number"	Curiosity Killed the Cat	September 1989	n/a	14	13 (Italy)	See chart performance entry
"No More Bolero's"	Gerard Joling	1989	n/a	n/a	1	n/a
"No More Lies"	Michel'le	October 1989	7	78	7 (United States)	See chart performance entry
"Oh Father"	Madonna	October 1989	20	n/a	6 (Italy)	See chart performance entry
"On Our Own"	Bobby Brown	April 1989	2	4	1 (New Zealand)	See chart performance entry
"Once Bitten Twice Shy"	Great White	1989	5	83	5	6 (U.S. Mainstream Rock - Billboard) - 11 (Canada)
"One"	Bee Gees	June 1989	7	71	7 (Argentina, United States)	See chart performance entry
"One"	Metallica	January 1989	35	13	1 (Finland)	See chart performance entry
"One Summer"	Daryl Braithwaite	January 1989	n/a	n/a	4 (Sweden)	5 (Norway) – 8 (Australia)
"Open Letter (To a Landlord)"	Living Colour	February 1989	82	n/a	11 (New Zealand)	11 (U.S. Mainstream Rock - Billboard)
"Orange Crush"	R.E.M.	January 1989	n/a	28	5 (New Zealand)	1 (U.S. Modern Rock Tracks - Billboard; U.S. Mainstream Rock - Billboard) - 15 (Australia) - 21 (Ireland)
"The Other Side"	Aerosmith	June 1989	22	46	22 (United States)	1 (U.S. Mainstream Rock Tracks - Billboard) - 73 (Australia)
"Pacific State"	808 State	November 1989	n/a	10	10 (United Kingdom)	82 (Australia)
"Paradise City"	Guns N' Roses	January 1989	5	6	4 (New Zealand)	4 (UK UK Independent Singles) - 21 (Scotland) - 35 (Australia) - 40 (Sweden) - 90 (Europe)
"Partyman"	Prince	August 1989	18	14	9 (Finland)	See chart performance entry
"Patience"	Guns N' Roses	April 1989	4	10	2 (Ireland)	See chart performance entry
"Personal Jesus"	Depeche Mode	September 1989	28	13	3 (Italy, Spain)	See chart performance entry
"Poison"	Alice Cooper	July 1989	7	2	2 (New Zealand, United Kingdom)	See chart performance entry
"Pop Singer"	John Mellencamp	April 1989	15	93	1 (Canada, New Zealand)	See chart performance entry
"Pour toi Arménie"	Charles Aznavour	February 1989	n/a	n/a	1 (France)	3 (Belgium) - 4 (Europe)
"Pump ab das Bier"	Werner Wichtig	October 1989	n/a	n/a	1 (West Germany)	3 (Austria) - 3 (Switzerland)
"Pump Up the Jam"	Technotronic	August 1989	2	2	(7 countries)	See chart performance entry
"Real Love"	Jody Watley	March 1989	2	31	2 (United States, Canada)	See chart performance entry
"Revival"	Eurythmics	August 1989	n/a	26	7 (Sweden)	See chart performance entry
"Rhythm Nation"	Janet Jackson	October 1989	2	23	2 (Canada, United States)	See chart performance entry
"Ride On Time"	Black Box	July 1989	n/a	1	1 (Iceland, Ireland, United Kingdom)	See chart performance entry
"Right Back Where We Started From"	Sinitta	May 1989	84	4	2 (New Zealand)	See chart performance entry
"Right Here Waiting"	Richard Marx	July 1989	1	2	1 (5 countries)	See chart performance entry
"Ring My Bell"	Collette	February 1989	n/a	93	4 (New Zealand)	5 (Australia)
"The Road to Hell"	Chris Rea	October 1989	n/a	10	6 (Austria)	See chart performance entry
"Roam"	The B-52's	December 1989	3	17	2 (New Zealand)	See chart performance entry
"Rocket"	Def Leppard	February 1989	12	15	5 (Ireland, New Zealand)	14 (Canada) - 15 (Australia, United Kingdom)
"Rock On"	Michael Damian	March 1989	1	n/a	1 (Canada, United States)	1 (U.S. Cash Top 100) - 45 (Germany) - 52 (Australia)
"Rock Wit'cha"	Bobby Brown	August 1989	7	33	7 (United States)	See chart performance entry
"Roni"	Bobby Brown	1989	3	21	1 (United States)	See chart performance entry
"Room in Your Heart"	Living in a Box	September 1989	n/a	5	5 (United Kingdom)	See chart performance entry
"Room to Move"	Animotion	February 1989	9	87	9 (United States)	21 (Canada)
"Round & Round"	New Order	February 1989	64	21	10 (Ireland)	See chart performance entry
"Runnin' Down a Dream"	Tom Petty	July 1989	23	55	23 (United States, Canada)	1 (US Billboard Album Rock Tracks) - 68 (Australia)
"Satisfied"	Richard Marx	April 1989	1	52	1 (United States	2 (Canada) - 5 (US Billboard Hot Adult Contemporary Tracks) - 20 (Australia) - 25 (Netherlands (Single Top 100)) - 42 (West Germany)
"Say Goodbye"	Indecent Obsession	May 1989	n/a	n/a	6 (Australia)	n/a
"Scandal"	Queen	October 1989	n/a	25	12 (Netherlands)	14 (Irish) - 16 (Netherlands (Dutch Top 40)) - 29 (Belgium)
"Sealed With a Kiss"	Jason Donovan	May 1989	n/a	1	1 (Ireland, United Kingdom)	See chart performance entry
"Second Chance"	38 Special	February 1989	6	n/a	2 (Canadian)	See chart performance entry
"She Drives Me Crazy"	Fine Young Cannibals	January 1989	1	5	(6 countries)	See chart performance entry
"She Has to Be Loved"	Jenny Morris	August 1989	n/a	n/a	3 (New Zealand)	5 (Australia)
"Shower Me with Your Love"	Surface	June 1989	5	n/a	n/a	1 (US Hot R&B/Hip-Hop Songs (Billboard)) - 3 (US Adult Contemporary (Billboard)) - 5 (US Cash Box)
"Sit and Wait"	Sydney Youngblood	September 1989	n/a	16	2 (Austria, Sweden, West Germany)	See chart performance entry
"So Alive"	Love and Rockets	May 1989	3	79	1 (Canada)	See chart performance entry
"Something's Gotten Hold of My Heart"	Marc Almond & Gene Pitney	January 1989	n/a	1	1 (5 countries)	See chart performance entry
"Sowing the Seeds of Love"	Tears for Fears	August 1989	1	1	1 (5 countries)	See chart performance entry
"Stand"	R.E.M.	January 1989	6	48	8 (Canada)	1 (US Alternative Airplay (Billboard), US Mainstream Rock (Billboard)) - 17 (Ireland) - 56 (Australia)
"Stop!"	Sam Brown	May 1989	65	4	1 (Belgium, Iceland, Netherlands [Dutch Top 40], Norway)	See chart performance entry
"Straight Up"	Paula Abdul	January 1989	1	3	1 (United States, Norway, Canada)	See chart performance entry
"Street Tuff"	Rebel MC & Double Trouble	October 1989	n/a	3	3 (Greece, Netherlands, United Kingdom)	See chart performance entry
"Stuck On You"	Paul Norton	March 1989	n/a	n/a	3 (Australia)	33 (New Zealand)
"Sweet Surrender"	Wet Wet Wet	September 1989	n/a	6	1 (Ireland)	See chart performance entry
"Swing the Mood"	Jive Bunny and the Mastermixers	June 1989	11	1	1 (15 countries)	See chart performance entry
"Talk It Over"	Grayson Hugh	June 1989	19	n/a	3 (New Zealand)	4 (Australia) - 9 (US Adult Contemporary [Billboard])
"Telephone Booth"	Ian Moss	June 1989	n/a	n/a	7 (Australia)	29 (New Zealand)
"Tell It Like It Is"	Don Johnson	January 1989	n/a	84	2 (Germany)	6 (France, Netherlands, Switzerland) - 13 (Austria)
"Tell Me Why"	Exposé	December 1989	9	97	15 (Canada)	See chart performance entry
"That's What I Like"	Jive Bunny and the Mastermixers	October 1989	69	1	1 (Ireland, Spain, United Kingdom)	See chart performance entry
"This Is Your Land"	Simple Minds	April 1989	n/a	13	6 (Ireland, Netherlands)	See chart performance entry
"This One's for the Children"	New Kids on the Block	October 1989	7	9	7 (Ireland, United States)	See chart performance entry
"This Time I Know It's for Real"	Donna Summer	February 1989	7	3	2 (Belgium)	See chart performance entry
"This Woman's Work"	Kate Bush	November 1989	n/a	25	20 (Ireland)	89 (Australia) See chart performance entry
"Too Many Broken Hearts"	Jason Donovan	February 1989	n/a	1	1 (Ireland, United Kingdom)	See chart performance entry
"Too Much"	Bros	July 1989	n/a	2	1 (Ireland)	See chart performance entry
"Tucker's Daughter"	Ian Moss	November 1989	n/a	n/a	2 (Australia)	6 (New Zealand)
"Veronica"	Elvis Costello	February 1989	19	31	19 (United States)	1 (US Alternative Airplay (Billboard)) - 10 (US Billboard Mainstream Rock Chart) - 22 (Ireland) - 27 (Australian) - 54 (Dutch Single Top 100) - 64 (Canada)
"Way of the World"	Max Q	September 1989	n/a	87	5 (New Zealand)	6 (US Alternative Airplay – Billboard) – 8 (Australia) – 44 (US Dance Charts)
"The Way to Your Heart"	Soulsister	February 1989	41	n/a	3 (Belgium)	4 (Germany) - 6 (Austria) - 8 (Switzerland, Netherlands)
"We Didn't Start the Fire"	Billy Joel	September 1989	1	7	1 (United States)	See chart performance entry
"What I Am"	Edie Brickell & New Bohemians	November 1988	7	31	1 (Canada)	See chart performance entry
"What You Don't Know"	Exposé	May 1989	8	99	8 (United States)	See chart performance entry
"When I Looked at Him"	Exposé	1989	10	n/a	5 (Netherlands - Single Top 100)	See chart performance entry
"When I See You Smile"	Bad English	August 1989	1	61	1 (Canada, United States)	See chart performance entry
"When Love Comes to Town"	U2 & B.B. King	April 1989	68	6	1 (Ireland)	See chart performance entry
"When the Night Comes"	Joe Cocker	November 1989	11	65	7 (Switzerland)	12 (US Adult Contemporary) - 6 (US Mainstream Rock) - 23 (Canada) - 50 (Australia) - 25 (Austria) - 7 (Switzerland) - 29 (Netherlands)
"When You Come Back to Me"	Jason Donovan	November 1989	n/a	2	1 (Finland, Ireland)	See chart performance entry
"Whenever God Shines His Light"	Van Morrison & Cliff Richard	November 1989	n/a	20	3 (Ireland)	n/a
"Wild Thing"	Tone Loc	October 1989	2	21	1 (New Zealand)	See chart performance entry
"Wind Beneath My Wings"	Bette Midler	February 1989	1	5	1 (Australia, United States)	See chart performance entry
"With Every Beat of My Heart"	Taylor Dayne	October 1989	5	53	5 (Canada, United States)	See chart performance entry
"Woman in Chains"	Tears For Fears	November 1989	36	26	11 (Canada)	See chart performance entry
"Wouldn't Change a Thing"	Kylie Minogue	July 1989	n/a	2	2 (UK)	See chart performance entry
"Y'a pas que les grands qui rêvent"	Melody	August 1989	n/a	n/a	2 (France)	12 (Europe)
"You Got It"	Roy Orbison	January 1989	33	n/a	3 (Canada)	See chart performance entry
"You Got It (The Right Stuff)"	New Kids on the Block	November 1989	3	1	1 (Australia, Spain, United Kingdom)	See chart performance entry
"You'll Never Stop Me Loving You"	Sonia	June 1989	n/a	1	1 (Europe, Ireland, United Kingdom)	See chart performance entry
"Young Years"	Dragon	April 1989	n/a	n/a	13 (New Zealand)	18 (Australia)
"Your Mama Don't Dance"	Poison	February 1989	4	n/a	4 (US Billboard Hot 100)	See chart performance entry

=== Other Chart hit singles ===
- "And the Night Stood Still" – Dion (# 75 US)
- "Belye Rozy" – Laskoviy Mai
- "Blush" - The Hummingbirds (# 19 Australia)
- "Carma (Omen 2)" – Mysterious Art
- "Casser la voix" - Patrick Bruel
- "C Day" - Confetti's
- "Cœur de loup" - Philippe Lafontaine
- "The Crack-Up" – The Black Sorrows (# 40 Australia)
- "Come Anytime" - Hoodoo Gurus (# 27 Australia) - (# 1 US Modern Rock Tracks - Billboard)
- "Communication" – John Farnham and Danni'Elle (# 13 Australia)
- "Compulsory Hero" – 1927 (# 14 Australia)
- "Cry in Shame" – Johnny Diesel and the Injectors (# 10 Australia)
- "Das Omen (Teil 1)" – Mysterious Art
- "Dumb Things" - Paul Kelly and the Coloured Girls (# 36 Australia - # 17 US Billboard Modern Rock Tracks)
- "Eve of the War" (Ben Liebrand Remix)" - Jeff Wayne
- "House of Cards" - James Reyne (# 17 Australia)
- "If I Ever Fall in Love Again" – Anne Murray (# 6 Canada Adult Contemporary - # 9 Canada Country Tracks - # 28 US Hot Country Songs Billboard)
- "I Get the Job Done" – Big Daddy Kane
- "Iko Iko" - The Belle Stars
- "It's Alright" - Gyan (# 49 Australia)
- "It's Only Love" - Simply Red
- "Killin' Time" – Clint Black (# 1 Canada Country Tracks - # 1 US Hot Country Songs Billboard)
- "Let Me Be" - Daryl Braithwaite (# 26 Australia)
- "London Kid" – Jean Michel Jarre & Hank Marvin
- "Lookin' for Love" – Johnny Diesel and the Injectors (# 28 Australia)
- "Nothing Has Been Proved" – Dusty Springfield (# 16 UK)
- "Onion Skin" – Boom Crash Opera (# 11 Australia)
- "Rich in Paradise" - FPI Project
- "Say Goodbye" - Indecent Obsession (# 6 Australia)
- "Simple Man" - Noiseworks (# 47 Australia)
- "Soldier of Love" – Donny Osmond (# 57 US - # 66 Canada)
- "Soul Revival" – Johnny Diesel and the Injectors (# 9 Australia)
- "The World Seems Difficult" – Mental As Anything (# 19 Australia)
- "Wait" - Gyan (# 14 Australia)
- "What the World Is Waiting For" - The Stone Roses
- "Where are you now" - Jimmy Harnen w/ Synch (# 10 United States, # 3 US Adult Contemporary [Billboard])
- "Winning It All" - The Outfield (# 94 Canada - # 104 US Cash Box Top 100)
- "You'll Never Know" – 1927 (# 15 Australia)
- "You're History" - Shakespears Sister

== Notable singles ==
Song title	Artist(s)	Release date(s)	Other Chart Performance(s)
"A Girl Like You"	The Smithereens	October 1989	2 (US Mainstream Rock [Billboard]) - 3 (US Alternative Airplay [Billboard]) - 38 (US Billboard Hot 100) - 62 (Canada Top Singles)
"The Beat(en) Generation"	The The	April 1989	4 (New Zealand) - 8 (Ireland) - 13 (US Billboard Modern Rock Tracks) - 18 (UK Singles Chart) - 50 (Australia) - 82 (Germany)
"Black Steel in the Hour of Chaos"	Public Enemy	1989	11 (U.S. Billboard Hot Rap Singles) - 86 (U.S. Billboard Hot R&B/Hip-Hop Singles & Tracks)
"Blow at High Dough"	The Tragically Hip	April 1989	1 (Canada Content) - 48 (Canada)
"Blues from a Gun"	The Jesus and Mary Chain	September 1989	1 (US Billboard Modern Rock Tracks) - 32 (UK Singles Chart)
"Can't Be Sure"	The Sundays	May 1989	45 (UK Singles Chart) - 74 (Australia)
"Closer to Fine"	Indigo Girls	July 1989	23 (US Billboard Modern Rock Tracks) - 48 (US Billboard Mainstream Rock) - 52 (US Billboard Hot 100) - 53 (Canada) - 57 (Australia)
"Come Anytime"	Hoodoo Gurus	January 1989	1 (US Billboard Modern Tracks) - 45 (Australia) - 1 (US Modern Rock Tracks [Billboard])
"Dirty Blvd."	Lou Reed	January 1989	1 (US Modern Rock Tracks [Billboard]) - 18 (US Billboard Mainstream Rock) - 45 (Australia)
"Dizzy"	Throwing Muses	February 1989	8 (US Billboard Modern Tracks) - 85 (United Kingdom)
"Fight the Power"	Public Enemy	July 1989	See chart entry performance
"God Is a Bullet"	Concrete Blonde	July 1989	15 (US Modern Rock Tracks [Billboard]) - 49 (US Mainstream Rock [Billboard]) - 146 (Australia) - 76 (Triple J Hottest 100, 1990 [Australia])
"Happy Birthday"	Concrete Blonde	May 1989	81 (Australia) - 82 (Canada)
"Head On"	The Jesus and Mary Chain	November 1989	2 (US Billboard Modern Rock Tracks) - 57 (UK Singles Chart) - 102 (Australia)
"Here Comes Your Man"	Pixies	June 1989	3 (US Alternative Airplay - Billboard) - 54 (UK Singles Charts) - 11 (New Zealand) - 11 (US Billboard Modern Rock Tracks) - 32 (Europe)
"I'll Be You"	The Replacements	April 1989	1 (US Billboard Mainstream Rock Chart) - 1 (US Billboard Modern Rock Tracks) - 51 (US Billboard Hot 100) - 92 (Canada)
"Info Freako"	Jesus Jones	February 1989	42 (UK Singles Chart) - 45 (Triple J Hottest 100, 1990 [Australia])
"Interesting Drug"	Morrissey	April 1989	4 (Ireland) - 9 (UK Singles Chart)
"The Last of the Famous International Playboys"	Morrissey	January 1989	3 (US Billboard Modern Rock Tracks) - 6 (UK Singles Chart)
"Made of Stone"	The Stone Roses	March 1989	90 (UK Singles Chart)
"Mayor of Simpleton"	XTC	January 1989	1 (US Billboard Modern Rock Tracks) - 15 (US Billboard Mainstream Rock) - 42 (Canada) - 46 (UK Singles Chart) - 89 (Australia)
"Monkey Gone to Heaven"	Pixies	March 1989	5 (US Alternative Airplay - Billboard) - 60 (UK Singles Charts)
"Nightmares"	Violent Femmes	1989	4 (US Modern Rock Tracks - Billboard) - 146 (Australia)
"Ouija Board, Ouija Board"	Morrissey	November 1989	2 (US Billboard Modern Rock Tracks) - 4 (Ireland) - 18 (UK Singles Chart) - 28 (New Zealand) - 58 (Europe)
"Pop Song 89"	R.E.M.	May 1989	14 (US Mainstream Rock [Billboard]) - 16 (US Alternative Airplay [Billboard]) - 86 (US Billboard Hot 100) - 94 (Canada Top Singles)
"Pure"	The Lightning Seeds	June 1989	8 (U.S. Billboard Alternative Airplay) - 16 (UK Singles Chart) - 31 (U.S. Billboard Hot 100) - 92 (Australia)
"Regina"	The Sugarcubes	September 1989	1 (UK Indie Singles) – 2 (US Modern Rock [Billboard]) – 27 (Irish Singles Chart) – 55 (UK Singles Chart) – 141 (Australia)
"She Bangs the Drums"	The Stone Roses	July 1989	9 (US Alternative Songs - Billboard) - 34 (UK Singles Charts) - 37 (New Zealand) - 128 (Australia)
"Sit Down"	James	June 1989	77 (UK Singles Charts) - 88 (Australia)
"Sometimes"	Max Q	October 1989	31 (Australia) - 37 (New Zealand) - 52 (UK Singles Chart)

=== Other Notable singles ===
- "Another World" - Hoodoo Gurus
- "Blush" - The Hummingbirds
- "Purple Toupee" - They Might Be Giants
- "Sweet Guy" - Paul Kelly and The Messengers
- "They'll Need a Crane" - They Might Be Giants
- "V for Vendetta" - Bughouse
- "Word Gets Around" - The Hummingbirds
- "You Happy Puppet" - 10,000 Maniacs

== Published popular music ==
- "Kiss the Girl" m. Alan Menken, w. Howard Ashman, from The Little Mermaid
- "Part of Your World" m. Alan Menken, w. Howard Ashman, from The Little Mermaid
- "Under the Sea" m. Alan Menken, w. Howard Ashman, from The Little Mermaid
- "We Didn't Start the Fire" w.m. Billy Joel
- "You Got It" w.m. Roy Orbison, Jeff Lynne & Tom Petty

== Classical music ==
- Elliott Carter
  - Three Occasions for Orchestra (1986–89)
  - Violin Concerto
- Peter Maxwell Davies – Symphony No. 4
- Kaija Saariaho - Du cristal...
- Anders Eliasson – Symphony No. 3, for alto saxophone and orchestra
- Einar Englund – Wind Quintet
- Karel Goeyvaerts
  - Aquarius, stage cantata, for eight sopranos and 15 instrumentalists
  - ...want de tijd is nabij (Because the Time Is Near), for male chorus and strings
- Ingram Marshall – Sinfonia Dolce far Niente
- Toshirô Mayuzumi
  - Mukyūdō, for orchestra
  - Rokudan, for harp
- John McCabe – String Quartet No. 5
- Einojuhani Rautavaara – Piano Concerto No. 2
- Robert Simpson
  - String Quartet No. 13
  - Vortex for Brass Band
- John Tavener – The Protecting Veil
- I Nyoman Windha – Puspanjali

== Opera ==
- Conrad Cummings – Photo-Op
- Anthony Davis – Under the Double Moon
- Lorenzo Ferrero
  - Charlotte Corday
  - Le Bleu-blanc-rouge et le noir
- Alexander Vustin – The Devil in Love (opera) (not performed)

== Musical theatre ==
- Aspects of Love (Andrew Lloyd Webber) – London production
- City of Angels – Broadway production opened at the Virginia Theatre and ran for 897 performances
- Grand Hotel – Broadway production opened at the Martin Beck Theatre and ran for 1017 performances
- Gypsy (Jule Styne and Stephen Sondheim) – Broadway revival
- Meet Me in St. Louis – Broadway production based on the 1944 film, ran for 252 performances
- Miss Saigon (Claude-Michel Schönberg and Alain Boublil) – London production
- Pacific Overtures (Stephen Sondheim and John Weidman) – London production
- Starmites (Stuart Ross and Barry Keating) - Broadway production opened at Criterion Center Stage Right and ran for 60 performances

== Musical films ==
- 101-Depeche Mode
- Eddie and the Cruisers II: Eddie Lives!
- The Fabulous Baker Boys
- ChaalBaaz
- Juke-Bar (animation)
- The Little Mermaid — animated feature film
- Little Nemo: Adventures in Slumberland
- Polly (TV film)
- Sons of Steel

== Births ==
- January 3 – Julia Nunes, American singer-songwriter
- January 4 – Labrinth, English singer-songwriter, musician, rapper and record producer
- January 6
  - James Durbin, American singer
  - Nicky Romero, Dutch DJ, record producer and remixer
- January 7 – Wrabel, American singer-songwriter
- January 9
  - Kyle Craft, American southern blues glam rock singer-songwriter and musician
  - Fely Irvine, Australian actress, singer, and dancer
- January 13 – Triinu Kivilaan, Estonian singer and model
- January 14 – Frankie Sandford, British singer-songwriter (S Club Juniors, The Saturdays)
- January 16 – Kiesza, Canadian singer-songwriter and multi-instrumentalist
- January 20 – Joel Pott, English musician (Shura)
- January 24
  - Calvin Goldspink, British singer (S Club Juniors)
  - Trace Cyrus, American musician (The Cyrus Family (Miley Cyrus, Billy Ray Cyrus, Noah Cyrus)) (Metro Station)
- January 25 – Yasmien Kurdi, Filipina singer and actress
- January 25 – Sheryfa Luna, French R&B singer
- January 27 – Dean Delannoit, Belgian singer winner of Idool 2007
- January 28 – Carly Paoli, British mezzo-soprano
- February 2 – Southside, American record producer, songwriter and rapper
- February 3 – Ryne Sanborn, American actor, singer and dancer
- February 7 – Jihae, South Korean singer and actress
- February 8 – Matias Tellez, Norwegian singer-songwriter, composer and record producer
- February 10 – Olga Korsak, Latvian singer-songwriter and actress, previously competitive figure skater
- February 16
  - Danielle Haim, American multi-instrumentalist and singer-songwriter (Haim)
  - Bry, Irish singer-songwriter
- February 17
  - Stacey McClean, British singer (S Club Juniors)
  - Chord Overstreet, American actor, Glee cast member, singer, musician and composer
- February 21 – Corbin Bleu, American actor and songwriter
- February 22 – Anna Sundstrand, Swedish singer and model
- February 24 – Lauren Brant, South African-Australian television personality, singer-dancer and actress
- February 27
  - Stefano Langone, American singer
  - Sam Sweeney, English folk musician
  - Shota Shimizu, Japanese singer
- February 28 – Zhang Liyin, Chinese singer-songwriter
- March 1
  - Sonya Kitchell, American jazz singer-songwriter
  - Karl-Erik Taukar, Estonian singer, bass guitarist and television host
- March 6 – Ray Chen, Taiwanese-Australian violinist
- March 9 – Taeyeon, South Korean K-pop singer (Girls' Generation)
- March 11
  - Shin Soohyun, South Korean K-pop singer (boy group U-KISS)
  - Rainey Qualley (Rainsford), American actress and singer
- March 13 – Yemi Alade, Nigerian singer-songwriter, actress and activist
- March 14
  - Yutaka Yamada, Japanese composer, arranger and orchestrator
  - Colby O'Donis, American singer
- March 19 – Ben Briley, American singer
- March 20 – Sam de Jong, New Zealand-born record producer, songwriter and multi-instrumentalist working in the United States (Ella Henderson, Amy Shark)
- March 20 – Lindsay Ell, Canadian singer
- March 21 – Rochelle Wiseman, British singer (S Club Juniors, The Saturdays)
- March 23
  - Mike Will Made It, American record producer, rapper and singer-songwriter (Miley Cyrus, Kendrick Lamar)
  - Josh Dela Cruz, American actor and television host (Blue's Clues & You!)
- March 25 – Alyson Michalka, American singer-songwriter and actress
- March 26 – Josiah Leming, American singer-songwriter
- March 29 – Michelle Zauner, Korean-American singer, musician, director and author
- March 30 – Eden xo, American singer-songwriter and actress
- April 8
  - Alexander DeLeon, American singer-songwriter (The Cab)
  - Matty Healy, British singer-songwriter, musician, producer, performance artist of The 1975 with George Daniel, (worked with: halsey, Taylor Swift, The Japanese House, Beabadoobee, Holly Humberstone, FKA twigs) (Dated: FKA Twigs, Taylor Swift)
  - Hitomi Takahashi, Japanese rock singer
- April 11 – Zola Jesus, American singer-songwriter
- April 18 – Jessica, K-pop singer (Girls' Generation)
- April 19 – Simu Liu, Canadian actor and singer
- April 20
  - Han Hee-jun, South Korean singer
  - Carlos Valdes (actor), Colombian-American singer-songwriter and actor
- April 24 – Thomas Sanders, American singer-songwriter, YouTuber, playwright, scriptwriter and internet personality (Dodie, Joan, Ben J Pierce)
- April 25 – Aysel Teymurzadeh, Azerbaijani pop and R&B singer
- April 26 – Daesung, South Korean singer (Big Bang)
- April 29 – Foxes, English singer, songwriter and model
- May 1 – Tim Urban, American singer-songwriter and guitarist
- May 3 – Mary Lambert, American country singer-songwriter and poet
- May 5 – Chris Brown, American singer and rapper
- May 9 – Katy B, English singer-songwriter
- May 13 – Tóc Tiên, Vietnamese singer
- May 15 – Sunny, South Korean K-pop singer (Girls' Generation)
- May 24 – G-Eazy, American rapper, producer, singer (working with Britney Spears, Bebe Rexha, Halsey)
- May 28 – Asuca Hayashi, J-pop singer
- May 30 – Kevin Covais, American Idol finalist
- June 3 – Jillette Johnson, American singer-songwriter, musician
- June 4 – Eldar Gasimov, Azerbaijani singer
- June 8 – Miya Folick, American musician
- June 9 – Chloë Agnew, Irish multilingual singer-songwriter (Celtic Women)
- June 13 – Lisa Tucker, American singer
- June 14 – Lucy Hale, American actress and singer
- June 15 – Oliver Sim, English singer and bass guitarist (the xx; Hideous Bastard)
- June 17 – Simone Battle, American actress, singer and dancer (G.R.L) (d. 2014)
- June 18 – Renee Olstead, American actress and jazz singer
- June 20
  - Benyamin Nuss, German pianist
  - Christopher Mintz-Plasse, American actor, comedian and musician
- June 25 – Sam Ryder, British singer-songwriter
- June 27 – Kelley Jakle, American actress and singer-songwriter
- July 2 – Dev, American singer-songwriter, rapper, model, musician and radio host
- July 3
  - Aisel, Azerbaijani singer
  - Elle King, American singer-songwriter
- July 5 – Joseph King, American singer-songwriter and guitarist (Canvas and Deadbeat Darling)
- July 6 – Laith Ashley, American model, actor, activist, singer-songwriter and entertainer of Dominican descent. (Taylor Swift,
- July 10 – Jennifer Åkerman, Swedish, blogger, model and singer-songwriter
- July 11 – Hana Pestle, American singer-songwriter and record producer (HANA) (Collaborator with Grimes and band member)
  - TĀLĀ – musician, singer-songwriter, record producer
- July 12 – Bambaata Marley, Jamaican singer-songwriter (son of Bob Marley and Rita Marley)
- July 13 – Sayumi Michishige, Japanese musician and longest running member of Morning Musume
- July 14 – Isaiah Sharkey, American guitarist and singer
- July 20 – Brooke Candy, American rapper, singer-songwriter, director, activist and dancer
- July 21
  - Jasmine Cephas Jones, American stage and screen actress-singer
  - Rory Culkin, American actor
- July 26 – Travis Garland, American singer and dancer
- July 31 – Alexis Knapp, American actress and singer
- August 1 – Tiffany, South Korean member of Girls' Generation
- August 2
  - Priscilla Betti, French singer
  - Jonas Blue, English DJ, record producer, songwriter and remixer
  - Relja Popović, Serbian rapper and actor
- August 4 – Jessica Mauboy, Australian singer- songwriter and actress (Young Divas)
- August 9 – Tainy, Puerto Rican record producer
- August 15
  - Belinda Peregrin, Spanish Mexican singer-songwriter and actress
  - Joe Jonas, American vocalist, singer-songwriter and musician (DNCE, Jonas Brothers) {dated AJ Michalka, Taylor Swift; married Sophie Turner; brother of Nick Jonas}
- August 17 – Mitchell Tenpenny, American Nashville country pop singer-songwriter
- August 18
  - Anna Akana, American actress, musician, filmmaker, author, YouTuber and comedian
  - Romy Madley Croft, English indie pop guitarist and vocalist (the xx)
- August 19
  - Lil' Romeo, American entertainer
  - Runtown, Nigerian singer
- August 21 – Hayden Panettiere, American actress, model, singer and activist (d. 2026)
- August 23 – Lianne La Havas, British singer-songwriter and multi-instrumentalist
- August 26 – Amir Obè, American rapper, singer, songwriter and record producer
- August 27 – Jessica Lea Mayfield, American singer-songwriter and musician
- August 30 – Bebe Rexha, American singer-songwriter and record producer
- September 1
  - Mohammed Assaf, Palestinian singer
  - Bill and Tom Kaulitz of Tokio Hotel
- September 2 – Zedd, Russian-German record producer, DJ, musician, multi-instrumentalist and songwriter (Foxes, Hayley Williams, Selena Gomez, Kesha)
- September 3 – Gusttavo Lima, Brazilian singer
- September 4 – Ryota Kohama, Japanese musician (One Ok Rock)
- September 5 – Kat Graham, American actress, singer, dancer and model
- September 7 – Loren Allred, American musician
- September 8 – Avicii, Swedish musician, DJ, remixer and record producer (d. 2018)
- September 10 – Sanjaya Malakar, American Idol finalist
- September 14 – Logan Henderson, actor and singer (Big Time Rush)
- September 21
  - Jason Derulo, American singer-songwriter and dancer
  - Emma Watkins, Australian singer, actress and dancer
- September 22
  - Hyoyeon, South Korean member of Girls' Generation
  - Cœur de pirate, Canadian bilingual singer-songwriter and musician
- September 24 – Kreayshawn, American rapper, creative director of OK 1984 and music video director
- September 25
  - Vick Hope, British TV and radio presenter, journalist and published author.
  - Danny L Harle, British music producer
- October 4
  - Rich Homie Quan, American rapper and singer-songwriter (d. 2024)
  - Tei Shi, Colombian-Canadian singer-songwriter and record producer
  - Stacey Solomon, English television personality and singer.
  - Lil Mama, American rapper
- October 7 – El General (Hameda Ben Amor), Tunisian rapper
- October 13 - Slimane, French singer-songwriter
- October 14 – Arca, Venezuelan musician and record producer
- October 15 – Fedez, Italian rapper and musician (Zara Larsson)
- October 19 – Empress Of, American singer-songwriter, musician and record producer
- October 20 – Jess Glynne, English soul-pop singer-songwriter
- October 22 – JPEGMafia, American rapper, songwriter and producer
- October 28 – Jack Colwell, Australian singer-songwriter (d. 2024)
- October 30 – Jay Asforis, British singer (S Club Juniors)
- November 2 – Katelyn Tarver, American singer-songwriter and actress
- November 3 – Paula DeAnda, American singer-songwriter
- November 8 – SZA, American singer-songwriter
- November 11 – Reina Tanaka, Japanese pop singer (Morning Musume)
- November 17 – Ali Tamposi, American songwriter
- November 18 – Neeti Mohan, Indian singer (Aasma)
- November 22 – Candice Glover, American R&B singer and actress
- November 30 – Daisy Evans, British singer (S Club Juniors)
- December 5
  - Yuri, South Korean member of Girls' Generation
  - Reek da Villian, American rapper (Flipmode Squad)
  - Kim Ye-won, South Korean actress, singer and entertainer (Jewelry)
- December 12
  - Janelle Arthur, American singer
  - Marcel "Shin" Gothow German drummer (Cinema Bizarre)
- December 13 – Taylor Swift, American singer-songwriter, musician, multi-instrumentalist, director, businesswoman and sometime actress
- December 14 – Onew, South Korean singer (Shinee)
- December 17 – Taylor York, American musician, songwriter and guitarist (Paramore; collaborator with Hayley Williams)
- December 18 – Ashley Benson, American model, singer and actress
- December 22 – Jordin Sparks, American Idol Season 6 winner
- December 27 – Calyssa Davidson, American violinist
- December 28 – Salvador Sobral, Portuguese singer Eurovision Song Contest winner
- December 29 – Pardison Fontaine, American rapper and songwriter (Cardi B, Megan thee Stallion)
- December 31 – Andrew Taggart, producer and vocal (The Chainsmokers)

== Deaths ==
- January 12 – Satyam, Indian film music director, 65
- January 20 – Beatrice Lillie, Canadian actress and singer, 94
- January 21 – Billy Tipton, American jazz musician, 74
- February 5 – Joe Raposo, composer and lyricist, "Bein' Green", 51 (non-Hodgkin's lymphoma)
- February 6 – King Tubby Jamaican DJ and composer, father of dub reggae, 48 (gunshot wounds)
- February 14 – Vincent Crane (The Crazy World of Arthur Brown), 45 (drug overdose)
- February 23 – Florencio Morales Ramos, singer and composer, 72
- March 19 – Alan Civil, horn player, 59
- March 20 – Archie Bleyer, US arranger and bandleader, 79
- April 8 – A. M. Rajah, Indian playback singer and composer, 59 (rail accident)
- April 26 – Lucille Ball, US actress and singer, 77
- May 9 – Keith Whitley, American singer, guitarist, and producer, 34
- May 10 – Woody Shaw, jazz musician, 44 (kidney failure)
- May 15 – Johnny Green, composer, conductor and arranger, 80
- May 30 – Zinka Milanov, operatic soprano, 83
- June 2 – Guido Agosti, Italian pianist and piano teacher, 87
- June 14 – Pete de Freitas, drummer with Echo & the Bunnymen, 27 (motorcycle accident)
- June 22 – Henri Sauguet, composer, 88
- June 24 – Hibari Misora, Japanese enka singer, 52 (hepatitis)
- July 5 – Ernesto Halffter, Spanish composer and conductor, 84
- July 16 – Herbert von Karajan, conductor, 81
- July 21 – Mushtaq Ali Khan, Indian sitar, surbahar and pakhawaj player, 78
- August 1 – John Ogdon, pianist, 52 (diabetes-related)
- August 2 – Luiz Gonzaga, Brazilian musician, 76
- August 21 – Raul Seixas, singer and songwriter, 44 (diabetes-related)
- August 25 – Gunnar Berg, Danish composer
- September 7 – Mikhail Goldstein, violinist and composer, 71
- September 14 – Perez Prado, Cuban bandleader and composer, 72
- September 15 – Jan DeGaetani, mezzo-soprano, 56 (leukemia)
- September 22 – Irving Berlin, composer, lyricist, 101
- September 24 – Jean Perrin, pianist and composer, 79
- September 30 – Virgil Thomson, composer, 92
- October 17 – Morteza Hannaneh, composer, 66
- October 19 – Alan Murphy, guitarist, member of Level 42 and Go West, 35 (AIDS-related)
- October 22 – Ewan MacColl, folk singer, 74
- October 31 – Conrad Beck, Swiss composer, 88
- November 5 – Vladimir Horowitz, pianist, 86
- November 15 – Alejo Durán, composer of vallenatos, 80
- November 29 – Yam Kim-fai, cantonese opera singer, 76
- December 6
  - Billy Lyall, keyboardist of Pilot and Bay City Rollers, 46 (AIDS-related)
  - Sammy Fain, US composer, 87
- December 21 – Ján Cikker, Slovak composer, 78
- December 26 – Sir Lennox Berkeley, composer, 86

== Awards ==
- The following artists are inducted into the Rock and Roll Hall of Fame: Dion, Otis Redding, The Rolling Stones, The Temptations and Stevie Wonder
- Grammy Awards of 1989
- 1989 Country Music Association Awards
- Eurovision Song Contest 1989
- 31st Japan Record Awards

== Charts ==
- List of Billboard Hot 100 number ones of 1989
- 1989 in British music#Charts
- List of Oricon number-one singles of 1989

== See also ==
- 1989 in British music
- Record labels established in 1989
