= Nick Brandt =

English photographer (born 1964)

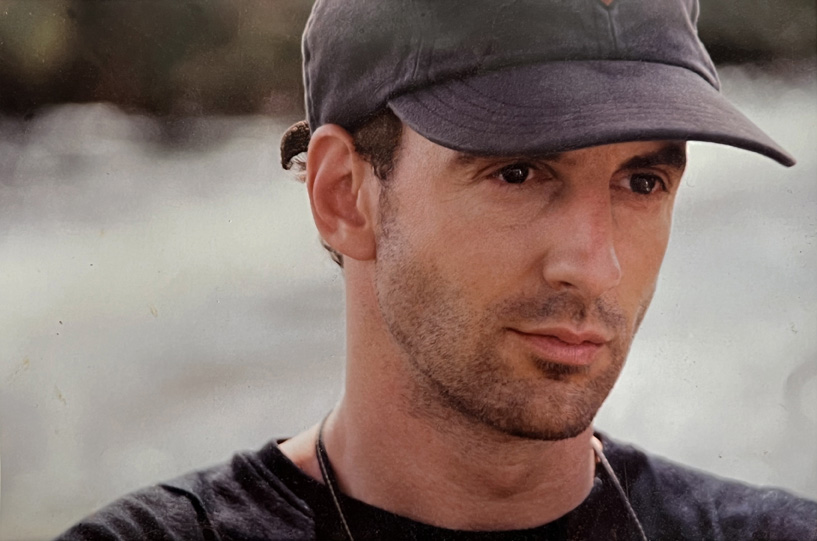
- Brandt in Botswana, 1999
- Born: 1964 (age 61–62); London, England, United Kingdom
- Education: Saint Martin's School of Art
- Occupations: Photographer, former music video director
- Spouse: Orla Brady (m. 2002)
- Website: www.nickbrandt.com

Nick Brandt (born 1964) is an English photographer and former music video director. His photographs focus on the impact of environmental destruction and climate change, both for some of the most vulnerable people across the planet and for the animal and natural world.

== Background and early career ==
Born in 1964 and raised in London, England, Brandt studied painting, and then film at Saint Martin's School of Art. He moved to California in 1992 and directed many award-winning music videos for the likes of Michael Jackson ("Earth Song", "Stranger in Moscow"), Whitney Houston ("I Will Always Love You"), Moby ("Porcelain"), Jewel ("Hands"), Grayson Hugh ("Talk It Over"), + XTC ("Dear God") among others.

It was in 1995 while directing "Earth Song" in Tanzania that Brandt fell in love with the animals and land of East Africa. In 2001, frustrated that he could not capture on film his feelings about the destruction of the natural world, he realized there was a way to achieve this through photography.

== Photography ==
=== On This Earth ===
In 2001, Brandt embarked upon his first photographic project: a trilogy of work to memorialize the vanishing natural grandeur of East Africa.

This work bore little relation to the typical, color, documentary-style wildlife photography. Brandt's images were mainly graphic portraits more akin to studio portraiture of human subjects from a much earlier era, as if these animals were already long dead. "The resulting photographs feel like artifacts from a bygone era". Using a Pentax 67II with two fixed lenses, Brandt photographed on medium-format black and white film without telephoto or zoom lenses. He writes: "You wouldn't take a portrait of a human being from a hundred feet away and expect to capture their spirit; you'd move in close."

A book of the resulting photography, On This Earth, was released in 2005 and constituted 66 photos taken from 2000 to 2004, with introductions by the conservationist and primatologist Jane Goodall, author Alice Sebold, and photography critic Vicki Goldberg.

In the afterword, Brandt explained the reasons for the methods he used at the time: "I'm not interested in creating work that is simply documentary or filled with action and drama, which has been the norm in the photography of animals in the wild. What I am interested in is showing the animals simply in the state of Being. In the state of Being before they are no longer are. Before, in the wild at least, they cease to exist. This world is under terrible threat, all of it caused by us. To me, every creature, human or nonhuman, has an equal right to live, and this feeling, this belief that every animal and I are equal, affects me every time I frame an animal in my camera. The photos are my elegy to these beautiful creatures, to this wrenchingly beautiful world that is steadily, tragically vanishing before our eyes."

=== A Shadow Falls ===
Returning to Africa repeatedly from 2005 to 2008, Brandt continued the project. The second book in the trilogy, A Shadow Falls, was released in 2009 and featured 58 photographs taken during the preceding years.

Writing in the introduction, Goldberg states: "Many pictures convey a rare sense of intimacy, as if Brandt knew the animals, had invited them to sit for his camera, and had a prime portraitist’s intuition of character...as elegant as any arranged by Arnold Newman for his human high achievers."

In additional introductions, philosopher Peter Singer, author of Animal Liberation, examines how Brandt's photographs address the theme of human moral conscience about animal welfare: "The photographs tell us, in a way that is beyond words, that we do not own this planet, and are not the only beings living on it who matter".

=== Across the Ravaged Land ===
Ranger with Tusks of Elephant Killed at the Hands of Man, Amboseli, 2011

In 2013, Brandt completed the trilogy On This Earth, A Shadow Falls, Across the Ravaged Land (the titles designed to form one consecutive sentence) with Across the Ravaged Land. A book of the photography was released the same year.

Across the Ravaged Land introduced humans in Brandt's photography for the first time. One such example is Ranger with Tusks of Elephant Killed at the Hands of Man, Amboseli, Kenya 2011. This photograph features a ranger employed by Big Life Foundation, a foundation started by Brandt in 2010 to help preserve critical ecosystems in Kenya and Tanzania. The ranger holds the tusks of an elephant of the Amboseli region killed by poachers.

Across the Ravaged Land includes a series of photographs entitled The Petrified, in which he collected animal carcasses petrified after drowning in the Lake Natron in Tanzania. The collection was featured in the Smithsonian Magazine.

=== Inherit the Dust ===
In 2014, Brandt returned to East Africa to photograph the escalating changes to the continent's natural world. In a series of panoramic photographs, he recorded the impact of man in places where animals used to roam. In each location, he erected a life size panel of one of his animal portrait photographs, setting the panels within a world of urban development, factories, wasteland and quarries.

A book of the work, Inherit the Dust, was published in 2016. In the book, Brandt writes, "We are living through the antithesis of genesis right now. It took billions of years to reach a place of such wondrous diversity, and then in just a few shockingly short years, an infinitesimal pinprick of time, to annihilate that."

Writing in LensCulture, editor Jim Casper stated: "The resulting wall-size prints are impeccably beautiful and stunning, as well as profoundly disturbing. They convey the vast spaces and light of contemporary Africa with a cinematic immersion and incredible detail. When standing in front of his images, the viewer is transported into the scenes – sometimes with wonder and awe and joy, and other times with overwhelming sadness, despair and disgust." Photography critic Michelle Bogre further noted: "Nick Brandt’s new photographic work, Inherit the Dust, is his visual cry of anguish about the looming apocalypse for animals habitats in Africa... The resulting images are simultaneously beautiful and horrifying, because they illustrate the irreconcilable clash of past and present".

=== This Empty World ===
Brandt's next project, This Empty World, was released in February 2019. The series was published in book form by Thames & Hudson. This new project, "addresses the escalating destruction of the African natural world at the hands of humans, showing a world where, overwhelmed by runaway development, there is no longer space for animals to survive. The people in the photos also often helplessly swept along by the relentless tide of 'progress.'”

Representing a thematic and technical evolution, the series required Brandt to develop a demanding new process. The Brooklyn Rail described it as:

An ambitious undertaking, the project required six months to complete, and necessitated the building of large sets and night shoots amid relentless dust-storms. Initially, partial sets were constructed on Maasai land—one of the few places where animals and humans still coexist—and motion-activated cameras hidden from view. After many weeks, the animals became comfortable enough to enter these strange domains, triggering the camera as they did so. The requisite next-step involved completing the set—a petrol station for example or a highway—and enlisting a cast of local residents to populate each scene, before taking the second image, almost always from the same position as the first. The final photograph is created from a composite of both images; producing scenes in which large mammals appear lost within a human-dominated milieu.

All the elements of the sets were recycled from one set into the next, and at the end back into the supply chain.

Says Brandt, "People still think the major issue with the destruction of wildlife in Africa is poaching, but especially in East Africa it's no longer the biggest problem. The biggest problem is the population explosion that is happening. With that comes an invasion of humanity and development into what was not so long ago wildlife habitat."

The resulting large-scale prints (up to 60x130 in / 140x300 cm) were exhibited in near-simultaneous exhibitions in London (Waddington Custot), New York (Edwynn Houk Gallery), and Los Angeles (Fahey/Klein Gallery).

=== The Day May Break ===
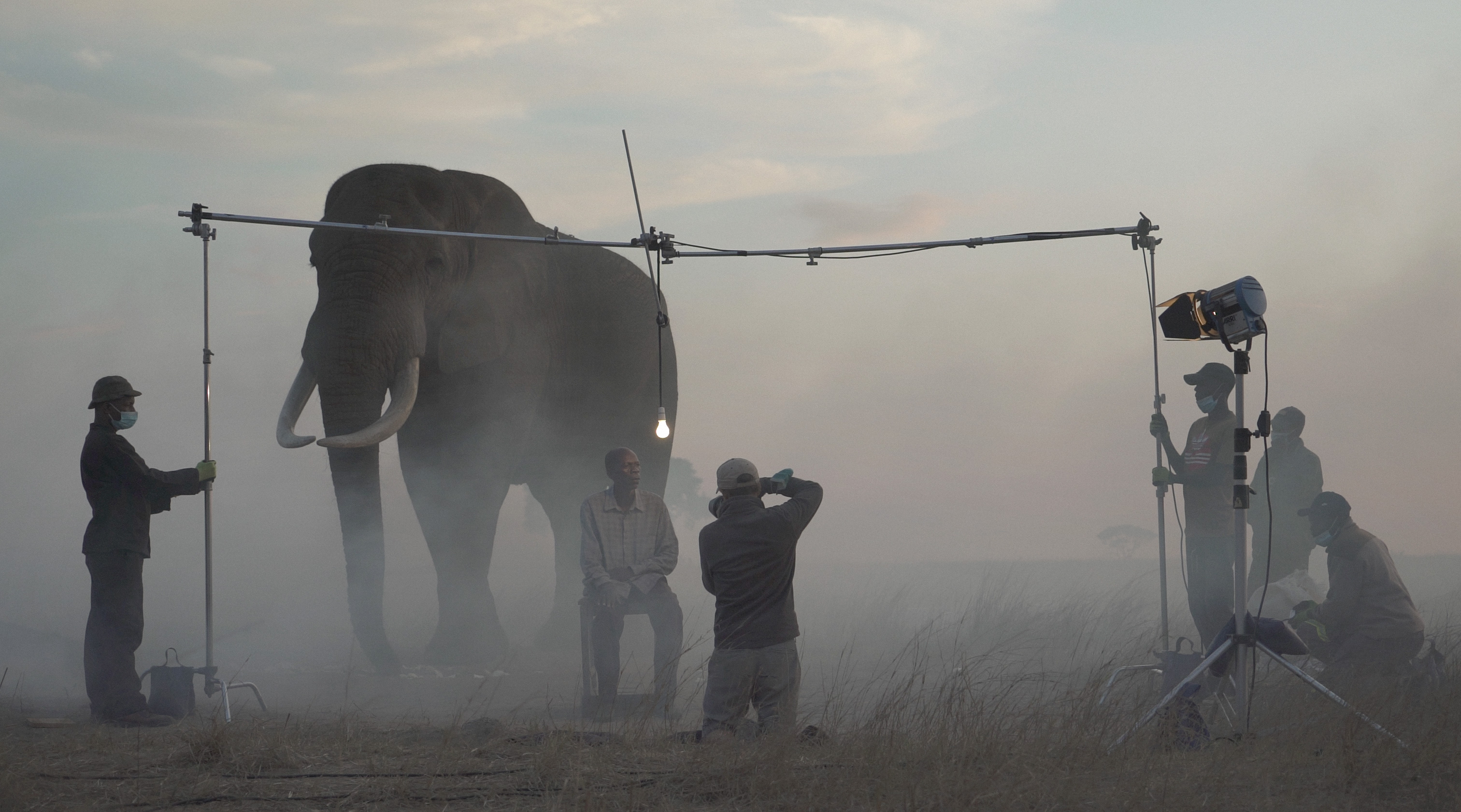
Nick Brandt photographing The Day May Break, Chapter One, Zimbabwe, 2020

In September 2021, Brandt released a project titled The Day May Break, the first chapter in a global series of photographs portraying people and animals that have been impacted by environmental degradation and destruction. The photographs for this series were taken by Brandt in Kenya and Zimbabwe late in 2020. Each photo captures threatened animals living in wildlife sanctuaries alongside people who have suffered from the effects of climate change, such as farmers displaced and impoverished by years-long severe droughts. The people and animals were photographed together in the same frame at the same time, and were taken at five sanctuaries and conservancies.

In the foreword to the book The Day May Break, published in the same year the project was released, author Yvonne Adhiambo Owour writes, "Nick Brandt is an artist and witness who seizes bleak and desperate fates, and by some mystery and alchemy, transmutes these into a gesture of poignant and painful beauty. It has been an eon, and then some, since I experienced contemporary photographs of people of African roots created by a person of Euro-American origin, that were this tender, human and gorgeous."

In October 2021, LA Weekly art critic Shany Nys Dambrot said the question the project poses “is whether the day will break like sunrise, or like glass. For as gorgeous, rich and operatic as the images are, this is not an Edenic vision of coexistence, it’s an urgent plea for taking action.” In the book The Day May Break, curator, author and photo historian Phillip Prodger wrote, "A landmark body of work by one of photography’s great environmental champions. Showing how deeply our fates are intertwined, Brandt portrays people and animals together, causing us to reflect on the real-life consequences of climate change. Channeling his outrage into quiet determination, the result is a portrait of us all, at a critical moment in the Anthropocene." Photos from the project were featured in public exhibits worldwide.

=== The Day May Break: Chapter Two (2022) ===
The second chapter of Brandt's global series, The Day May Break, was photographed in Bolivia in February and March 2022. This body of work was released in September 2022, and first exhibited at Edwynn Houk Gallery in New York and at Polka Galerie in Paris.

The people in the photographs were found across Bolivia, and like in Chapter One, had all been negatively impacted by the effects of climate change, from extreme droughts to flooding. The animals were all rescues as a result of habitat destruction and wildlife trafficking, and had been relocated to Senda Verde Animal Sanctuary in the Yungas Mountains where the photographs were taken.

As in Chapter One, the people and animals, largely habituated to humans, were photographed together in the same frame.

The book of the work was published in spring 2023 by Hatje Cantz Verlag in Germany.

=== SINK / RISE (The Day May Break, Chapter Three) (2023) ===
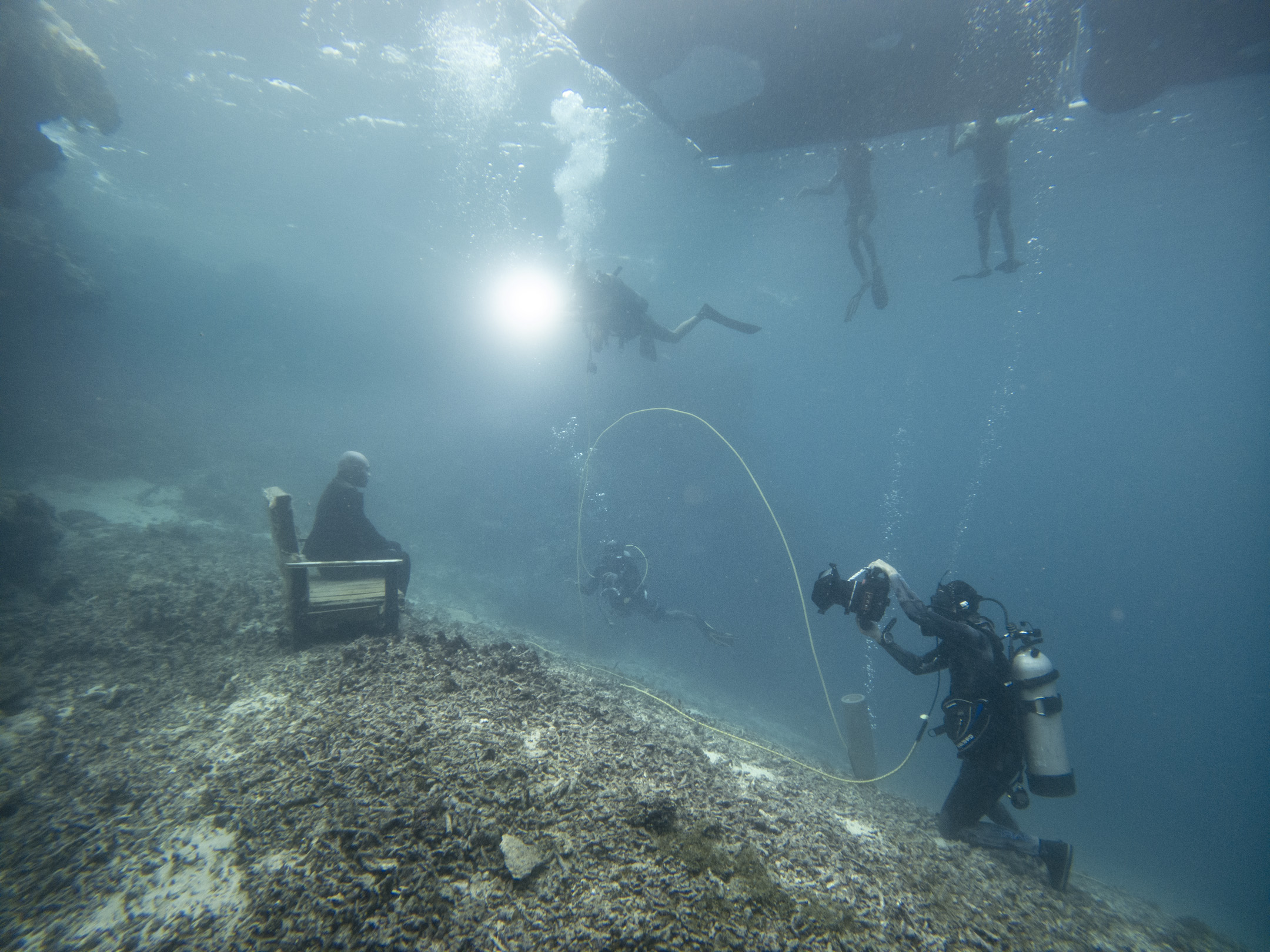
Nick Brandt photographing SINK - RISE, Fiji, 2023

SINK / RISE is the third chapter of The Day May Break, the ongoing global series portraying people and animals that have been impacted by environmental destruction. This third chapter was released in September 2023 and focuses on South Pacific Islanders impacted by rising oceans from climate change. The local people in these photos were photographed underwater in the ocean off the coast of the Fijian islands.

Spread across the planet, there is a common link between the countries in which each chapter of The Day May Break is photographed : They are among the countries least responsible for climate change. Their global carbon emissions are marginal compared to industrial nations, yet they are disproportionately harmed by anthropogenic effects. In an article by CNN's Catherine Shoichet, Brandt describes the work as “pre-apocalyptic”.

Everything is shot in-camera underwater. It's the first series that Brandt has photographed with exclusively human subjects.

In March 2024, SINK / RISE, the book, was published by Hatje Cantz Verlag.

In the book's Foreword, author Zoe Lescaze writes, "Faced with a seemingly impossible task, Nick Brandt has created a profoundly original body of work, one that represents an entirely new approach to climate-conscious photography…although they are several meters below the surface, the subjects of Brandt’s mesmerizing photographs do not float or swim. Incredibly, they sit on sofas, stand on chairs, use seesaws, and pose in ways they might on land. The effect is otherworldly, as though the familiar laws of physics have stalled in this strange, liminal zone between land and sea."

The first large institutional exhibition featuring all three chapters of The Day May Break simultaneously took place at Newlands House Gallery in the United Kingdom.

=== THE ECHO OF OUR VOICES (The Day May Break, Chapter Four) (2024) ===
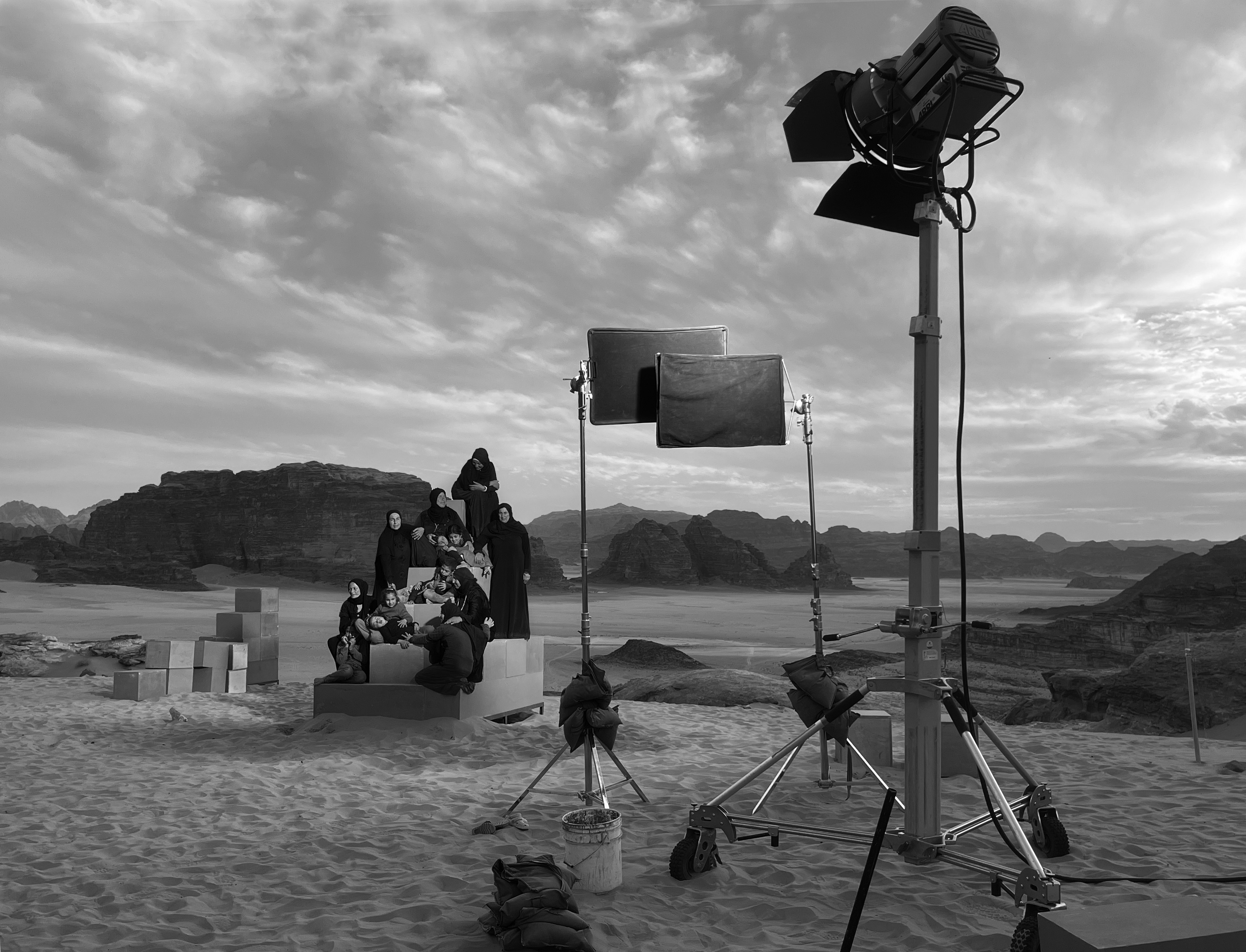
Making Of "Women with Sleeping Children", Jordan, 2024

The Echo of Our Voices is the fourth chapter in the ongoing series The Day May Break. This latest chapter was released in September 2024, and ties in with an exhibition at Fahey/Klein Gallery in Los Angeles.

The photographs feature rural families, who fled the war in Syria, now living in Jordan.

Jordan is the second most water-scarce country in the world. Suffering from continuous displacement due to climate change, the Syrians photographed move their homes up to several times a year to where there is available agricultural work, or wherever there has been sufficient rainfall to enable crops to grow.

In September 2025, The Echo of Our Voices, the book, was published by Skira.

In a CNN feature in October 2024 about the work, CNN journalist Alaa Elassar writes: “Brandt strikes a flawless balance when bringing together harsh and soft elements, in this case the delicate reunion between the roughness of the desert - and the refugees stories - with the warmth of family. The refugees come alive through his photos; the physical connection to emanate affection, and in the eyes of the children are crystal-clear dreams. Some of the women look straight into the camera with expressions that scream resilience...In a world that so frequently dehumanizes Arabs, especially Arab woman who fall victim to stereotypical depictions of oppressed voiceless beings, Brandt has made an effort to give these women a platform to reclaim their power.”

The Echo of Our Voices was partially funded by Gallerie d’Italia Museum in Turin (that is funded by Banco Intesa Sanpaolo).

== Big Life Foundation ==
In September 2010, in urgent response to the escalation of poaching in Africa due to increased demand from the Far East, Nick Brandt and Richard Bonham co-founded the non-profit organization Big Life Foundation, dedicated to the conservation of Africa's wildlife and ecosystems.

With one of the most significant elephant populations in Africa rapidly diminishing due to poaching, the Amboseli ecosystem—which straddles both Kenya and Tanzania—became the foundation's large-scale pilot project.

Headed up in Kenya by conservationist Richard Bonham, multiple fully equipped teams of anti-poaching rangers have been placed in newly built outposts in the critical areas throughout the more than 2-million-acre (8,100 km^{2}) area. This effort has resulted in a dramatically reduced incidence of killing and poaching of wildlife in the ecosystem.

Big Life Foundation now employs several hundred rangers protecting approximately 2 million acres of ecosystem.

== Bibliography ==
- 2005: On This Earth, Chronicle Books
- 2009: A Shadow Falls, Abrams Books
- 2013: Across the Ravaged Land, Abrams Books
- 2014: On This Earth, A Shadow Falls, D.A.P. / Big Life Editions
- 2016: Inherit The Dust, D.A.P. / Edwynn Houk Editions
- 2019: This Empty World, Thames and Hudson
- 2021: The Day May Break, Hatje Cantz Verlag
- 2023: The Day May Break: Chapter Two, Hatje Cantz Verlag
- 2024: SINK / RISE (The Day May Break: Chapter Three), Hatje Cantz Verlag
- 2025: The Echo of Our Voices: The Day May Break, Chapter Four Skira

== Selected exhibitions ==
- 2004: On This Earth, Camera Work, Hamburg
- 2006: African elegy, Staley-Wise Gallery, New York
- 2006: On This Earth, Camera Work, Berlin
- 2009: A Shadow Falls, Staley-Wise Gallery, New York
- 2009: A Shadow Falls, Fahey/Klein Gallery, Los Angeles
- 2010: A Shadow Falls, Camera Work, Berlin
- 2011: On This Earth, A Shadow Falls, Fotografiska Stockholm, Stockholm
- 2012: On This Earth, A Shadow Falls, Hasted Kraeutler, New York
- 2013: Across The Ravaged Land, Camera Work, Berlin
- 2013: Across The Ravaged Land, Hasted Kraeutler, New York
- 2013: Across The Ravaged Land, Fahey/Klein Gallery, Los Angeles
- 2013: Across The Ravaged Land, Atlas Gallery, London
- 2013: On This Earth, A Shadow Falls, Preus National Museum of Photography, Oslo
- 2013: On This Earth, A Shadow Falls, Dunkers Kulturhus Museum, Helsingborg, Sweden
- 2014: On This Earth, A Shadow Falls, Galerie Nikolas Ruzicska, Salzburg, Austria
- 2015: On This Earth, A Shadow Falls, Salo Art Museum, Finland
- 2015: On This Earth, A Shadow Falls Across The Ravaged Land, Fotografiska Stockholm, Stockholm
- 2016: Inherit the Dust, Fotografiska Stockholm, Stockholm
- 2016: Inherit the Dust, Edwynn Houk Gallery, New York
- 2016: Inherit the Dust, Fahey/Klein Gallery, Los Angeles
- 2016: Inherit the Dust, Camera Work, Berlin
- 2016: On This Earth, A Shadow Falls Across The Ravaged Land, Stadthaus Ulm Museum, Ulm, Germany
- 2017: Inherit the Dust, Multimedia Art Museum, Moscow
- 2017: Inherit the Dust, Custot Gallery, Dubai,
- 2018: Inherit the Dust, Meet the Meat
- 2019: This Empty World, Fahey/Klein Gallery, Los Angeles
- 2019: This Empty World, Edwynn Houk Gallery, New York
- 2019: This Empty World, Waddington Custot, London
- 2019: Inherit the Dust, Sonoma Valley Museum of Art, Sonoma, California
- 2019: Inherit the Dust, National Museum of Finland, Helsinki
- 2021: This Empty World, Festival Photo, La Gacilly, France
- 2021: The Day May Break, Oslo Negativ, Oslo
- 2021: The Day May Break, Custot Gallery, Dubai
- 2021: The Day May Break, Fahey/Klein Gallery, Los Angeles
- 2021: The Day May Break, Atlas Gallery, London
- 2021: This Empty World / Inherit the Dust, Fotografiska Tallinn, Tallinn
- 2022: This Empty World, SNAP Orlando, Orlando
- 2022: The Day May Break, Polka Galerie, Paris
- 2022: This Empty World, The Museum of Photographic Arts, San Diego
- 2022: The Day May Break Chapters One and Two, Edwynn Houk Gallery, New York
- 2022: The Day May Break Chapters One and Two, Shanghai Center for Photography, Shanghai
- 2023: The Day May Break Chapter Two, Polka Galerie, Paris
- 2023: The Day May Break Chapters One and Two, Visa Pour L'image, Perpignan, France
- 2023: The Day May Break Chapters One and Two, 212 Photography Festival, Istanbul, Turkey
- 2024: The Day May Break Chapters One, Two and Three, Newlands House Gallery, Petworth, England
- 2024: SINK / RISE, Polka Galerie, Paris
- 2024: Inherit the Dust / This Empty World, Lehigh University Art Galleries, Zoellner Arts Center, Bethlehem, Pennsylvania
- 2024: The Day May Break Chapters One, Two and Three, Chungmu Art Center, Seoul, South Korea
- 2024: The Echo of Our Voices, Fahey/Klein Gallery, Los Angeles
- 2025: The Day May Break Chapters One, Two and Three, Cankar Center, Ljubljana, Slovenia
- 2025: The Day May Break Chapters One, Two and Three, Hangar Photo Art Center, Brussels
- 2026: The Day May Break - all four chapters - was first shown in an institutional setting at Gallerie d/‘Italia Museum in Turin, Italy. Intesa Sanpaolo commissioned and partly funded the fourth and last chapter, The Echo of Our Voices, photographed in Jordan in 2024.
