= Gabriela Fleury =

American scientist

- Education: James Madison University (B.S.), University of Cape Town (M.S.)
- Occupations: Conservation scientist, science communicator, writer, game designer
- Website: https://fleurygs3.wixsite.com/gabifleury

Gabriela Fleury, or Gabi Fleury, is a Brazilian-American conservation PhD student scientist and researcher. She primarily focuses on researching methods to mitigate human-wildlife conflict in Eastern and Southern Africa. Fleury is also a science communicator, writer, game designer, and an advocate for equity, justice, and inclusion in science.

== Early life and education ==
Born in Boston Massachusetts, Gabi Fleury was diagnosed with osteosarcoma in her left fibula at 7 years old. She received chemotherapy treatment and went through years of physical therapy to relearn how to walk and has said "My cancer battle is one of the driving reasons that I’m so focused and passionate about what I do today, I knew I wanted to do something impactful because I realized from a young age that no one is guaranteed time here."

Fleury completed an undergraduate thesis summa cum laude on lion and livestock conflict in the Amboseli region of southern Kenya at James Madison University, and a Masters thesis on environmental change in the Northern Cape community of Riemvasmaak at the University of Cape Town. Gabi is currently a PhD Candidate in Environment and Resources at the Nelson Institute of the University of Wisconsin-Madison, studying human-carnivore interactions in the Kalahari desert region of Botswana.

== Career ==
Fleury studies human-wildlife conflict and methods to mitigate conflict with species such as cheetahs and African wild dogs. Following her Masters degree and previous to her PhD research, she completed a research internship on Big Life Foundation's predator compensation program in Amboseli, Kenya and worked as a Human-Wildlife Conflict Research Manager at Cheetah Conservation Fund in Namibia and a Conservation Programs Officer at Rainforest Trust.

Fleury also co-founded Bright Frog Games with programmer Jaymie Krambeck in 2016, which is an independent game studio that creates environmental education games. Operation Ferdinand was a game developed by the studio that teaches livestock enclosure construction and predator identification through several mini games. The game was developed to target non-literate farmers and only utilizes visuals to make the game accessible to all regardless of language or literacy barriers.

=== Research ===
Fleury researches human-wildlife conflict, mainly within Eastern and Southern Africa, and works to find methods to mitigate conflict between carnivores and humans, particularly farmers with livestock. She has studied various methods like flashing lights to deter predators from depredating livestock, and also researches both direct and indirect drivers of human-wildlife conflict.

=== Outreach ===
Fleury does outreach through interviews, videos, podcasts, and presentations to share scientific findings to a broader audience. She discusses conservation issues with students, whether it's partnering with organization "Skype A Scientist" to present about human-wildlife conflict to grade school students, or serving on panels to discuss entry into conservation fields with undergraduates at over forty U.S. based universities.

Fleury frames her work mitigating human-wildlife conflict as "interspecies diplomacy", using diplomatic principles and empathy for both human and non-human animal needs in order to work towards human-wildlife coexistence. In November 2024, Fleury did an invited TEDx Talk at TEDxOshkosh entitled "Conservation as interspecies diplomacy", which highlights some of these framing principles. Fleury has also appeared on Science Friday, The Nagging Naturalist, Nice Genes! a podcast by Genome British Columbia, and did a video interview for the conservation technology community, WILDLABS.

An Afro-Latine scientist, Fleury was also one of the inaugural organizing committee members of the Black Mammalogists Week social media awareness campaign, created to provide opportunities for current and aspiring Black mammalogists across the Diaspora to form conscious, fruitful connections, in addition to illuminating historical and present-day Black contributions to the field of Mammalogy.

Using she/they/ela/elu pronouns, Fleury advocates for queer and BIPOC contributions to scientific research: "I feel passionate about being able to help shatter the stereotypes that you have to be high income, cisgender, heterosexual, or white to succeed in this field."

== Publications ==
- Harris, Nyeema C; Wilkinson, Christine E; Fleury, Gabriela; Nhleko, Zoliswa N (2023). "Responsibility, equity, justice, and inclusion in dynamic human–wildlife interactions". Frontiers in Ecology and the Environment. 21 (8): 380–387. doi:10.1002/fee.2603. ISSN 1540-9309.
- Fleury, G., Hoffman, M., & Todd, S. Land reform and its impact on the arid South African environment: Riemvasmaak as a case study. African Journal of Range & Forage Science, Volume 38, Issue 2, 2021.

== Awards ==
Fleury received Fulbright grants in both 2020 and 2024 to support her doctoral research in the Ghanzi District of Botswana, where she collaborates with local NGOs to develop and evaluate nonlethal deterrents—such as acoustic, visual, and scent-based systems—to reduce predation by cheetahs, leopards, and African wild dogs on both communal and commercial farmlands. In 2015, she was awarded a Rotary Foundation Global Grant Scholarship to pursue a master's degree in conservation biology at the University of Cape Town, where her research examined the ecological and socioeconomic factors influencing environmental change in South Africa's Northern Cape. Fleury was named to the Forbes 30 Under 30 list in the Science category in 2021, one of only two conservation scientists recognized that year. She was also featured as a Young Science Star, a program that highlights early-career scientists making impactful contributions to research and outreach.
