= Big Life Foundation =

Conservation organization in East Africa

- Nickname: Big Life
- Region served: East Africa
- Revenue: $7.89 m USD (2024)
- Website: https://biglife.org

The Big Life Foundation ("Big Life") is a non-profit conservation organization created to preserve the wildlife and habitats of the Amboseli-Tsavo-Kilimanjaro ecosystem of East Africa through community-based and collaborative strategies. In 2024, it reported revenues of $7.89 million dollars.

== History ==
The origin of the Big Life Foundation began in photographer Nick Brandt's expeditions to take studio-like portraits of the animals of the Amboseli region. Discovering that the elephant subjects of his photographs were being killed by rampant poaching, Brandt established a locally-based conservation effort focused on preserving the wildlife of the ecosystem.

This undertaking led to the formation of the Big Life Foundation, co-founded in September 2010 by Brandt, conservationist Richard Bonham, and entrepreneur Tom Hill. Bonham and Hill had been engaged in conservation work in the region with the Maasailand Preservation Trust for the last two decades; this effort was expanded and became the Big Life Foundation.

== Conservation Approach ==
Big Life's conservation approach focuses on three key areas: wildlife protection (including elephants, rhinos, and predators), human-wildlife conflict abatement, and community enrichment through employment, education, and health initiatives.

=== Wildlife protection ===
Big Life's conservation mission is to prevent wildlife poaching within 1.6 million acres of wilderness in the Amboseli-Tsavo-Kilimanjaro ecosystem. This wildlife protection effort currently employs local Maasai rangers— who utilize permanent outposts and tent-based field units, Land Cruiser patrol vehicles, tracker dogs, and planes for aerial surveillance.

In addition to preventive measures, Big Life partners with local communities to track and apprehend poachers and collaborates with local prosecutors to ensure that wildlife criminals are punished.

Big Life works in partnership with the Kenya Wildlife Service to protect the Eastern black rhino in the Chyulu Hills area. Together, the two organizations conduct extensive foot patrols, aerial surveillance, monitoring via camera traps, and engage in direct confrontation with rhino poachers when necessary.

=== Predator protection ===
To discourage herders from retaliating with spears or poisoned carcasses, Big Life and local communities developed a compensation program, the Predator Compensation Fund. This fund protects lions, and other carnivores in the ecosystem, by partially compensating local Maasai for economic losses due to predation. In return, communities agree not to kill predators in retaliation.

=== Human-Wildlife conflict abatement ===
Big Life works in partnership with the local Maasai to reduce the negative impact of human-wildlife interactions, such as crop-raiding by hungry elephants. Co-founder Bonham notes, “An elephant can trample a crop in 10 minutes. This year we have had four people killed by them. We try to scare them. We have guys out at night. We use bangers and paintball guns to shoot chilly [sic] bombs. When one hits an elephant, they get a whiff and a sore nose. But they realize that big bangs are not dangerous. They learn.” Human-wildlife conflict remains one of the greatest challenges with initiatives such as elephant-proof fencing as one possible solution.

=== Community enrichment ===
Big Life supports the future of communities in East Africa by funding teachers’ salaries, providing scholarship funds for local students, and conducting conservation workshops. “...if we are to save these endangered species from extinction, we're going to have to save the humans first. For far too long now, right across the continent, wildlife is being wiped out because poverty is shoved into the unsolvable box.”

=== Maasai Olympics ===
In 2008, Big Life was approached by Maasai elders for assistance in ending lion hunting within the Maasai warrior culture. This event marked the beginning of a collaboration that would eventually lead to the first-ever Maasai Olympics, “an organized Maasai sports competition based upon traditional warrior skills.” Now a biennial event, the Maasai Olympics aims to create a shift in the cultural attitudes of the Maasai, away from competitive and ritual lion-killing towards a broader commitment to wildlife and habitat conservation.
