= 1989 in South Korean music =

The following is a list of notable events and releases that happened in 1989 in music in South Korea.

== Debuting and disbanded in 1989 ==
=== Soloists ===
- Epaksa
- Kim Kwang-seok
- Lee Seung-chul

=== Disbanded groups ===
- Deulgukhwa

== Releases in 1989 ==
=== January ===
Date	Title	Artist	Genre(s)
10	New Age 2	Lee Soo-man	K-pop

=== February ===
Date	Title	Artist	Genre(s)
15	I Won't Say a Thing / Is This Hate or Longing?	Na-mi	Dance pop

=== March ===
Date	Title	Artist	Genre(s)

=== April ===
Date	Title	Artist	Genre(s)
10	My Street / A Bout of Laughter	Lee Sun-hee	K-pop

=== May ===
Date	Title	Artist	Genre(s)
5	Infinity	Hahn Dae-soo	Folk rock

=== June ===
Date	Title	Artist	Genre(s)
10	Feel Good Day	Kim Wan-sun	K-pop

=== July ===
Date	Title	Artist	Genre(s)
1	Don't Say Goodbye	Lee Seung-chul	Soft rock
15	Turning Point	Insooni	R&B

=== August ===
Date	Title	Artist	Genre(s)
1	I Want to Love/Just a Little Heart	Sobangcha	K-pop
10	Meeting	Noh Sa-yeon	K-pop

=== September ===
Date	Title	Artist	Genre(s)
20	Kim Kwang-seok	Kim Kwang-seok	Folk rock

=== October ===
Date	Title	Artist	Genre(s)
5	Bom Yeoreum Gaeul Kyeoul 2	SSAW	Jazz-rock fusion
25	Back to You (너에게로 또다시)	Byun Jin-sub	K-pop

=== November ===
Date	Title	Artist	Genre(s)
1	뉴에이지	Lee Soo-man	Folk-pop
15	Min Hae-kyung 9	Min Hae-kyung	Trot

=== December ===
Date	Title	Artist	Genre(s)
10	Last Concert	Lee Seung-chul	Soft rock
