= Fight the Power... Live! =

Video by Public Enemy
- Released: 1989
- Genres: Hip-hop, East Coast hip-hop, hardcore hip-hop

Fight the Power... Live! is a live video by Public Enemy released in 1989 on the VHS and laserdisc formats.

A DVD edition was released in November 2014 as part of a deluxe reissue of the group's 1988 album It Takes a Nation of Millions to Hold Us Back.

Professional ratings
Review scores
Source	Rating
AllMusic	link

== Track listing ==
1. "Countdown to Armageddon"
2. "Public Enemy No. 1"
3. "Miuzi Weighs a Ton"
4. "Night of the Living Baseheads"
5. "Fight the Power" (Music video)
6. "Bring the Noise"
7. "Don't Believe the Hype"
8. "Cold Lampin with Flavor"
9. "Black Steel in the Hour of Chaos" (Music video)
10. "Rebel Without a Pause"
11. "Terminator X to the Edge of Panic"
12. "Night of the Living Baseheads" (Music video)
13. "Prophets of Rage"

As noted it also features some music videos, and also skits between songs - made to instrumental/turntablist PE songs that are not listed.
