= Three Occasions for Orchestra =

Three Occasions for Orchestra is an orchestral triptych by the American composer Elliott Carter. The work was composed from 1986 through 1989 and was first performed at the Royal Festival Hall, London, by the BBC Symphony Orchestra under Oliver Knussen on October 5, 1989.

== Composition ==
Three Occasions has a duration of roughly 16 minutes and is composed in three movements:

1. A Celebration of Some 100 × 150 Notes
2. Remembrance
3. Anniversary

"A Celebration of Some 100 × 150 Notes" was commissioned by the Houston Symphony for the 150th anniversary of the state of Texas. "Remembrance" was composed in memory of the music patron and philanthropist Paul Fromm. "Anniversary" was written for Carter's wife Helen in celebration of their 50th wedding anniversary.

=== Instrumentation ===
The work is scored for an orchestra comprising three flutes (2nd and 3rd doubling piccolo), two oboes, cor anglais, two clarinets, bass clarinet, two bassoons, contrabassoon, four horns, three trumpets, three trombones, tuba, timpani, two percussionists, piano (doubling celesta), and strings.

== Reception ==
Tom Service of The Guardian called it "Carter at his most ebullient and unbuttoned." Reviewing a 2006 performance of the work, he wrote, "For all his avant-garde rigour, Carter's music is definitively American, and in Knussen's performance of the exuberant Three Occasions, there was music of glinting, luminous brilliance, like sunlight playing on the glass and steel of New York's skyscrapers. It is a subtle, modernist poetry which whets the appetite for the rest of the weekend." Likewise, Gramophone said the piece "represents Carter's inclusive late style at something near its best."
