= List of Oricon number-one singles of 1989 =

The highest-selling singles in Japan are ranked in the Oricon Singles Chart, which in 1989 was published in what was then called Oricon Weekly magazine. The data are compiled by Oricon based on each singles' physical sales. This list includes the singles that reached the number one place on that chart in 1989.

== Oricon Weekly Singles Chart ==
Issue date	Song	Artist(s)	Ref.
January 2	"Tonbo"	Tsuyoshi Nagabuchi	
January 9	"Tonbo"	Tsuyoshi Nagabuchi	
January 16	"Aki"	Otokogumi	
January 23	"Koi Hitoyo"	Shizuka Kudo	
January 30	"Koi Hitoyo"	Shizuka Kudo	
February 6	"True Love"	Yui Asaka	
February 13	"Ai ga Tomaranai (Turn It into Love)"	Wink	
February 20	"Gekiai"	Tsuyoshi Nagabuchi	
February 27	"Gekiai"	Tsuyoshi Nagabuchi	
March 6	"Rosécolor"	Miho Nakayama	
March 13	"Time Zone"	Otokogumi	
March 20	"Chikyu wo Sagashite"	Hikaru Genji	
March 27	"Namida wo Misenai de (Boys Don't Cry)"	Wink	
April 3	"Namida wo Misenai de (Boys Don't Cry)"	Wink	
April 10	"Namida wo Misenai de (Boys Don't Cry)"	Wink	
April 17	"Be My Baby"	Complex	
April 24	"Be My Baby"	Complex	
May 1	"Gomen yo Namida"	Toshihiko Tahara	
May 8	"Liar"	Akina Nakamori	
May 15	"Arashi no Sugao"	Shizuka Kudo	
May 22	"Arashi no Sugao"	Shizuka Kudo	
May 29	"Arashi no Sugao"	Shizuka Kudo	
June 5	"Return to Myself (Shinai, Shinai, Natsu.)"	Mari Hamada	
June 12	"Diamonds"	Princess Princess	
June 19	"Sayonara Baby"	Southern All Stars	
June 26	"Diamonds"	Princess Princess	
July 3	"Maitta ne Konya"	Shonentai	
July 10	"Sekai de Ichiban Atsui Natsu"	Princess Princess	
July 17	"Samishii Nettaigyo"	Wink	
July 24	"Samishii Nettaigyo"	Wink	
July 31	"Taiyo ga Ippai"	Hikaru Genji	
August 7	"Summer Game"	Kyosuke Himuro	
August 14	"Rockin' My Soul"	Otokogumi	
August 21	"Taiyo ga Ippai"	Hikaru Genji	
August 28	"Taiyo ga Ippai"	Hikaru Genji	
September 4	"Taiyo ga Ippai"	Hikaru Genji	
September 11	"Taiyo ga Ippai"	Hikaru Genji	
September 18	"Kōsa ni Fukarete"	Shizuka Kudo	
September 25	"Kōsa ni Fukarete"	Shizuka Kudo	
October 2	"Kōsa ni Fukarete"	Shizuka Kudo	
October 9	"Kōsa ni Fukarete"	Shizuka Kudo	
October 16	"Kōsa ni Fukarete"	Shizuka Kudo	
October 23	"Kōsa ni Fukarete"	Shizuka Kudo	
October 30	"Niji o Mitakai"	Misato Watanabe	
November 6	"Running to Horizon"	Tetsuya Komuro	
November 13	"One Night in Heaven (Mayonaka no Angel)"	Wink	
November 20	"One Night in Heaven (Mayonaka no Angel)"	Wink	
November 27	"Gravity of Love"	Tetsuya Komuro	
December 4	"Shiroi Christmas"	Jun Sky Walker(s)	
December 11	"Film no Mukōgawa"	Yoko Minamino	
December 18	"Shoppai Mikazuki no Yoru"	Tsuyoshi Nagabuchi	
December 25	"Christmas Eve"	Tatsuro Yamashita	

== See also ==
- 1989 in Japanese music
