= Talk It Over =

Talk show starring Diane Dimond

Talk It Over is a call-in style advice talk show featuring Diane Dimond, Lee Jay Berman and Louise Palanker. Each episode begins by talking about celebrity conflicts or conflicts in the news and how those in the dispute could Talk It Over with each other or with a mediator, followed by listeners calling in and emailing with their personal and professional conflicts. The co-hosts, led by professional mediator Berman, coach and strategize with the callers about how to approach resolving their conflicts and how to Talk It Over.

Talk It Over is available on popular sites such as iTunes, Podnova and Odeo as well. Various blog sites have shown positive responses and reviews to the show overall. These blogging sites include talkshoe, mefeedia and podcast pickle.
