= List of UK top-ten singles in 1989 =

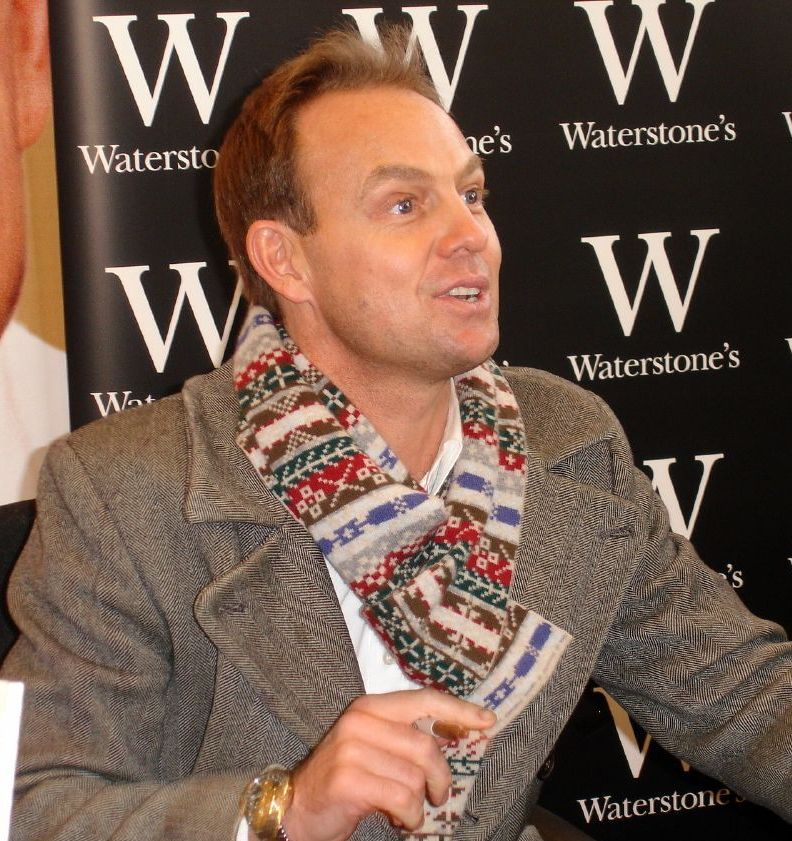
Australian singer and actor Jason Donovan (pictured in 2007) had six UK top 10 hits in 1989, the most of any artist. These included his number-one solo hits "Too Many Broken Hearts" and "Sealed with a Kiss", as well as his guest appearance with Band Aid II on "Do They Know It's Christmas?".

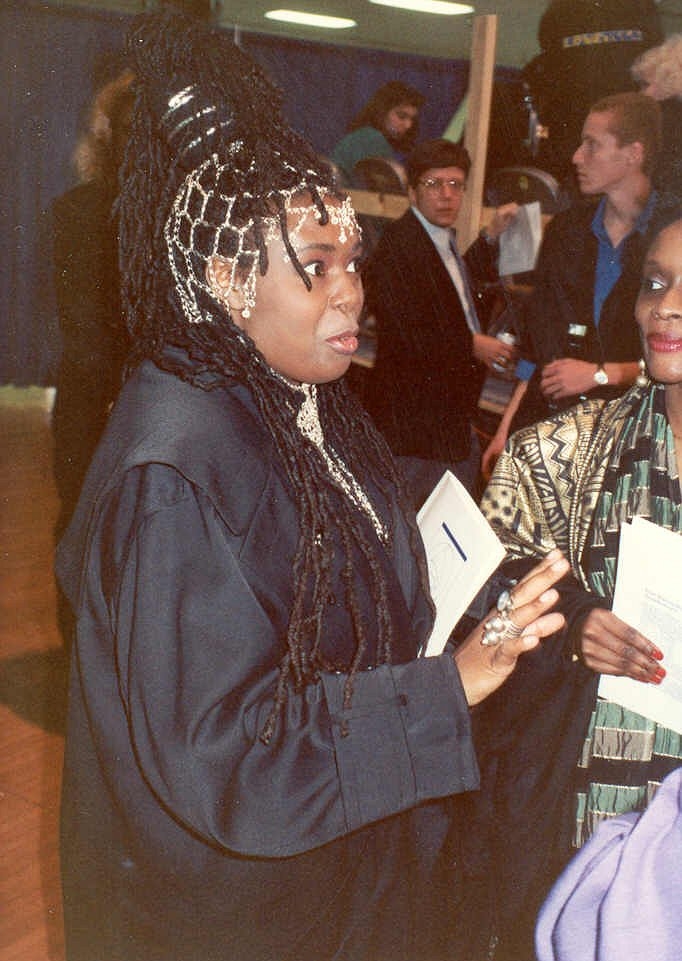
Caron Wheeler provided vocals on Soul II Soul's number-one hit "Back to Life (However Do You Want Me)", which topped the chart for four weeks and became the UK's fifth best selling single of the year. Soul II Soul achieved four top 10 singles during the year.

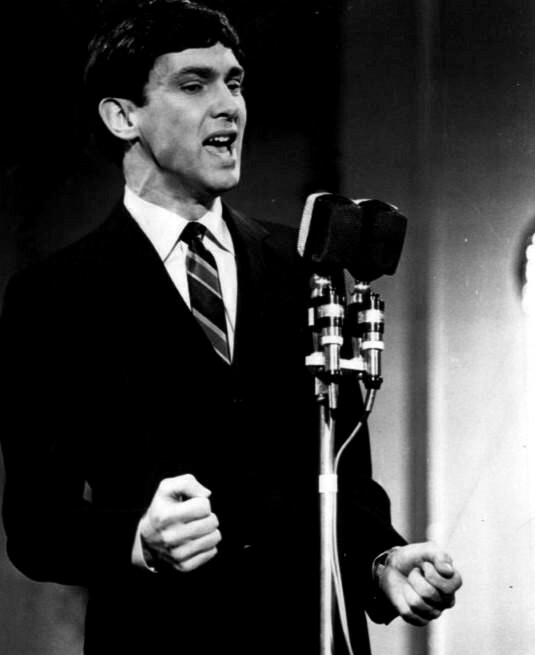
Gene Pitney (pictured in 1967) scored his first and only UK number-one single in January 1989 after teaming up with Marc Almond for a duet version of Pitney's 1967 hit single "Something's Gotten Hold of My Heart", which topped the chart for four weeks.

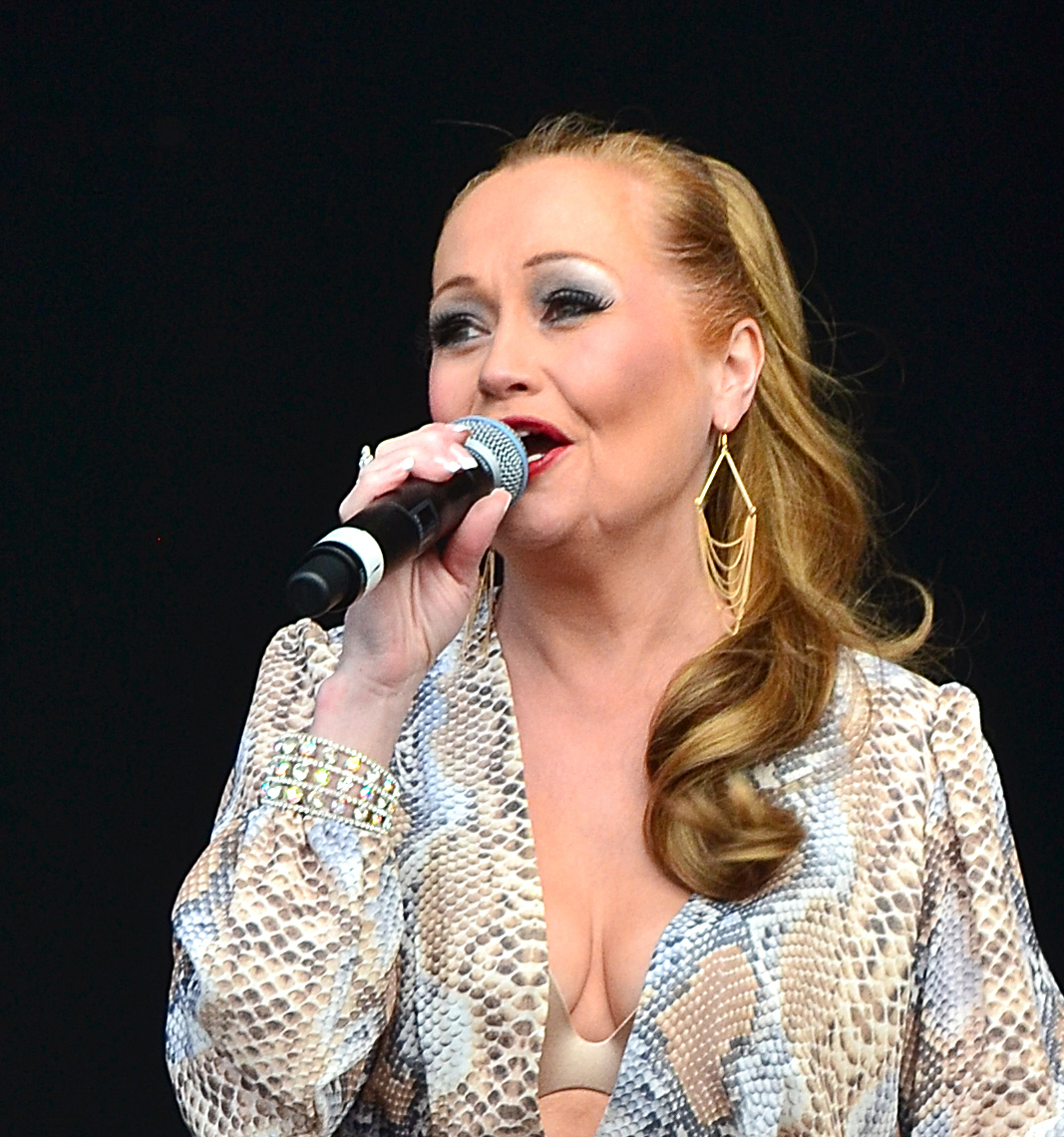
Liverpool-born singer Sonia (pictured in 2014) was only eighteen years old when her debut single "You'll Never Stop Me Loving You" reached number-one in the UK in July.

The UK Singles Chart is one of many music charts compiled by the Official Charts Company that calculates the best-selling singles of the week in the United Kingdom. Before 2004, the chart was only based on the sales of physical singles. This list shows singles that peaked in the Top 10 of the UK Singles Chart during 1989, as well as singles which peaked in 1988 but were in the top 10 in 1989. The entry date is when the single appeared in the top 10 for the first time (week ending, as published by the Official Charts Company, which is six days after the chart is announced).

One-hundred and forty-five singles were in the top ten in 1989. Nine singles from 1988 remained in the top 10 for several weeks at the beginning of the year. "Buffalo Stance" by Neneh Cherry, "Crackers International (EP)" by Erasure, "Good Life" by Inner City, "Especially for You" by Kylie and Jason and "Loco in Acapulco" by Four Tops were the singles from 1988 to reach their peak in 1989. Forty-seven artists scored multiple entries in the top 10 in 1989. The Beautiful South, Guns N' Roses, Michael Ball, New Kids on the Block and Stone Roses were among the many artists who achieved their first UK charting top 10 single in 1989.

The first number-one single of the year was "Especially for You" by Kylie Minogue and Jason Donovan. Overall, eighteen different singles peaked at number-one in 1989, with Jason Donovan (4, including his Band Aid II participation) having the most singles hit that position.

== Background ==
=== Multiple entries ===
One-hundred and forty-five singles charted in the top 10 in 1989, with one-hundred and forty-one singles reaching their peak this year.

Forty-seven artists scored multiple entries in the top 10 in 1989. Australian singer Jason Donovan secured the record for the most top 10 hits in 1989 with six hit singles. "Too Many Broken Hearts" reached number-one, where it remained for two weeks, and a further five weeks in the top ten. Similarly "Sealed with a Kiss" had two weeks at the summit, and four weeks in the top ten in total. Donovan had a third number one single, his collaboration with Neighbours co-star Kylie Minogue, "Especially for You" taking the honours for three weeks, and staying in the top ten for 10 weeks. Other entries included "Every Day (I Love You More)" and "When You Come Back to Me" (both number 2). Donovan was also a participant on the Band Aid II charity single "Do They Know It's Christmas?", which was also a chart-topper in December 1989.

Alongside her guest spot on the band aid single and duet with Donovan, Kylie Minogue had three further high charting entries in her own right. "Hand on Your Heart" was a number-one hit, "Wouldn't Change a Thing" just missed out but reached number two, and "Never Too Late" was another top five single, peaking at number 4. British trio Bros had four top tens to their name in 1989, not including vocal and instrumental credit for band members Luke and Matt Goss with Band Aid II. Christmas double single "Cat Among the Pigeons"/"Silent Night" carried over to January and "Too Much" (number 2), "Chocolate Box" (9) and "Sister" (10) were all top ten hits.

Cliff Richard and Madonna both had four top-ten entries, the latter's biggest hit being, "Like a Prayer", which topped the chart, and the former's festive hit "Mistletoe and Wine" sticking around for the early part of the year. Big Fun members Jason Herbert, Mark Gillespie and Phil Creswick, Bobby Brown, Caron Wheeler, Guns N' Roses, Holly Johnson, Jive Bunny and the Mastermixers and Soul II Soul were the other artists who all had three top 10 singles in 1989.

Lisa Stansfield was one of a number of artists with two top-ten entries, including the number-one single "All Around the World". The Beautiful South, Donna Summer, Inner City, Neneh Cherry and Tina Turner were among the other artists who had multiple top 10 entries in 1989.

=== Chart debuts ===
Fifty-eight artists achieved their first top 10 single in 1989, either as a lead or featured artist. Of these, nine went on to record another hit single that year: The Beautiful South, Big Fun (band), Caron Wheeler, Chris Rea, Lisa Stansfield, London Boys, Martika, Sonia and Technotronic. Guns N' Roses, Jive Bunny and the Mastermixers and Soul II Soul all had two other entries in their breakthrough year.

The following table (collapsed on desktop site) does not include acts who had previously charted as part of a group and secured their first top 10 solo single.

Artist	Number of top 10s	First entry	Chart position	Other entries
Will to Power	1	"Baby I Love Your Way - Free Bird"	6	—
Mike and the Mechanics	1	"The Living Years"	2	—
Boy Meets Girl	1	"Waiting for a Star to Fall"	9	—
Roachford	1	"Cuddly Toy"	4	—
Ten City	1	"That's the Way Love Is"	8	—
Kym Mazelle	1	"Wait!"	7	—
Michael Ball	1	"Love Changes Everything"	2	—
Sam Brown	1	"Stop!"	4	—
Lananeeneenoonoo	1	"Help!"	3	—
Texas	1	"I Don't Want a Lover"	6	—
Paula Abdul	1	"Straight Up"	3	—
Soul II Soul	3	"Keep on Movin'"	5	"Back to Life (However Do You Want Me)" (1), "Get a Life" (3)
Caron Wheeler ^{[A]}	2	"Keep on Movin'"	5	"Back to Life (However Do You Want Me)" (1)
Guns N' Roses	3	"Paradise City"	6	"Sweet Child o' Mine" (6), "Patience" (10)
The Reynolds Girls	1	"I'd Rather Jack"	8	—
Kon Kan	1	"I Beg Your Pardon"	5	—
Pat and Mick	1	"I Haven't Stopped Dancing Yet"	9	—
B.B. King	1	"When Love Comes to Town"	6	—
MC Merlin	1	"Who's in the House?"	8	—
London Boys	2	"Requiem"	6	"London Nights" (2)
Midnight Oil	1	"Beds Are Burning"	6	—
Edelweiss	1	"Bring Me Edelweiss"	5	—
Stock Aitken Waterman	1	"Ferry Cross the Mersey"	1	—
Roxette	1	"The Look"	7	—
Lynne Hamilton	1	"On the Inside"	3	—
The Beautiful South	2	"Song for Whoever"	2	"You Keep It All In" (8)
LRS	1	"It is Time to Get Funky"	9	—
Sonia	2	"You'll Never Stop Me Loving You"	1	"Do They Know It's Christmas?" (1)
Jive Bunny and the Mastermixers	3	"Swing the Mood"	1	"That's What I Like" (1), "Let's Party" (1)
Lil Louis	1	"French Kiss"	2	—
Martika	2	"Toy Soldiers"	5	"I Feel the Earth Move" (7)
Liza Minnelli	1	"Losing My Mind"	6	—
Shakespears Sister	1	"You're History"	7	—
Big Fun	2	"Blame It on the Boogie"	4	"Can't Shake the Feeling" (8)
Black Box ^{[B]}	1	"Ride on Time"	1	—
Betty Boo	1	"Hey DJ! I Can't Dance (To That Music You're Playing)"/"Ska Train"	7	—
Starlight ^{[B]}	1	"Numero Uno"	9	—
Richard Marx	1	"Right Here Waiting"	2	—
Damian	1	"The Time Warp"	7	—
Alyson Williams	1	"I Need Your Lovin'"	8	—
Technotronic	2	"Pump Up the Jam"	2	"Do They Know It's Christmas?" (1)
Felly	1	"Pump Up the Jam"	2	—
Sydney Youngblood	1	"If Only I Could"	3	—
Rebel MC	1	"Street Tuff"	3	—
Double Trouble	1	"Street Tuff"	3	—
Fresh 4	1	"Wishing on a Star"	10	—
Lizz E	1	"Wishing on a Star"	10	—
Lisa Stansfield	2	"All Around the World"	1	"Do They Know It's Christmas?" (1)
Chris Rea	2	"The Road to Hell (Part 2)"	10	"Do They Know It's Christmas?" (1)
New Kids on the Block	1	"You Got It (The Right Stuff)"	1	—
Jeff Wayne	1	"The Eve of the War (Ben Liebrand Remix)"	3	—
Mixmaster ^{[B]}	1	"Grand Piano"	9	—
Kaoma	1	"Lambada"	4	—
Stone Roses	1	"Fools Gold"/"What the World Is Waiting For"	8	—
808 State	1	"Pacific State"	10	—
Andy Stewart	1	"Donald Where's Your Troosers?"	4	—
Band Aid II	1	"Do They Know It's Christmas?"	1	—
Cathy Dennis	1	"Do They Know It's Christmas?"	1	—
Glen Goldsmith	1	"Do They Know It's Christmas?"	1	—

Notes

Holly Johnson scored a succession of hit singles in the line-up of Frankie Goes to Hollywood, and was also part of the original Band Aid single in 1984. However, 1989's "Love Train" from his debut solo album, Blast, became his first solo top 10. Robert Howard from The Blow Monkeys duetted with solo artist Kym Mazelle on "Wait!", reaching number 8 and becoming his first single to reach the top 10 without his band.

Bobby Brown performed with the group New Edition from 1978 to 1985, notably topping the chart with "Candy Girl" in 1983. He went it alone this year with three top 10 hits, including "My Prerogative" peaking at number six. Gerry Marsden headed up Gerry and the Pacemakers and contributed to the "Ferry Cross the Mersey" charity single in 1989. Gladys Knight, formerly of Gladys Knight & The Pips, had her only top 10 solo single, the theme song to the James Bond film Licence to Kill.

Bette Midler first entered the chart as a participant on 1985's "We Are the World" in the supergroup USA for Africa. However signature song "Wind Beneath My Wings" was her first official entry on her own. Members of Black Box also charted under several other aliases in 1989, including Starlight and Mixmaster who are both credited as separate acts.

Band Aid II consisted of many artists who had previously charted as solo artists, namely Chris Rea, Cliff Richard, D Mob, Jason Donovan, Kylie Minogue, Lisa Stansfield, Sonia and Technotronic. Musicians with chart credits as part of a group included Sara Dallin, Siobhan Fahey and Keren Woodward (Bananarama, also on the original Band Aid), Phil Creswick, Mark Gillespie and Jason John (Big Fun), Luke Goss and Matt Goss (Bros), Kevin Godley (10cc and Godley and Creme), Jimmy Somerville (Communards and Bronski Beat), Andrew Banfield, Aaron Brown, David Milliner, Michael Milliner and Hamish Seelochan (The Pasadenas), Mike Stock and Matt Aitken (Stock Aitken Waterman) and Graeme Clark, Tommy Cunningham, Neil Mitchell and Marti Pellow (Wet Wet Wet). Cathy Dennis and Glen Goldsmith both reached the top 10 for the first time with the Band Aid II record.

=== Songs from films ===
Original songs from various films entered the top 10 throughout the year. These included "Waiting for a Star to Fall" (from Three Men and a Little Lady), "Leave Me Alone" (Moonwalker), "Batdance" (Batman), "Licence to Kill" (Licence to Kill), "Wind Beneath My Wings" (Beaches), "On Our Own" (Ghostbusters II) and "You Got It (The Right Stuff)" (The Wizard).

=== Charity singles ===
A couple of songs recorded for charity reached the top 10 in 1989. The single "Ferry Cross the Mersey" saw The Christians, Gerry Marsden, Holly Johnson, Paul McCartney, Stock Aitken Waterman uniting as a tribute to victims of the Hillsborough Disaster where 96 football fans ultimately lost their lives. The single was a chart-topper for 3 weeks from 20 May 1989 (week ending).

For the second time, a set of music stars formed the supergroup Band Aid II and released the single "Do They Know It's Christmas?" to continue support for ongoing famine in Ethiopia. The song featured artists including Kylie Minogue, Sonia, Luke and Matt Goss and Cliff Richard. It was the Christmas number-one single for 1989, topping the chart for three weeks from 23 December 1989 (week ending).

=== Best-selling singles ===
Black Box had the best-selling single of the year with "Ride On Time", which spent 11 weeks in the top 10, including 6 weeks at the top spot, sold 850,000 copies and was certified platinum by the BPI. "Swing the Mood" by Jive Bunny and the Mastermixers came in second place, selling 820,000 copies and losing out by 30,000 sales. The Bangles' "Eternal Flame", "Too Many Broken Hearts" from Jason Donovan and "Back to Life (However Do You Want Me)" by Soul II Soul featuring Caron Wheeler made up the top five. Singles by Marc Almond featuring Gene Pitney, Jive Bunny and the Mastermixers ("That's What I Like"), Technotronic featuring Felly, Band Aid II and Kylie Minogue were also in the top ten best-selling singles of the year.

== Top-ten singles ==
Key

Symbol	Meaning
‡	Single peaked in 1988 but still in chart in 1989.
(#)	Year-end top-ten single position and rank
Entered	The date that the single first appeared in the chart.
Peak	Highest position that the single reached in the UK Singles Chart.

Entered (week ending)	Weeks in top 10	Single	Artist	Peak	Peak reached (week ending)	Weeks at peak
Singles in 1988
3 December 1988	6	"Cat Among the Pigeons"/"Silent Night" ‡	Bros	2	3 December 1988	1
3 December 1988	6	"Mistletoe and Wine" ‡	Cliff Richard	1	10 December 1988	4
10 December 1988	9	"Especially for You"	Kylie Minogue & Jason Donovan	1	7 January 1989	3
10 December 1988	6	"Suddenly" ‡	Angry Anderson	3	10 December 1988	2
10 December 1988	9	"Crackers International (EP)"	Erasure	2	7 January 1989	3
17 December 1988	6	"Good Life"	Inner City	4	7 January 1989	2
17 December 1988	4	"Burning Bridges" ‡	Status Quo	5	31 December 1988	1
31 December 1988	5	"Buffalo Stance"	Neneh Cherry	3	14 January 1989	2
31 December 1988	3	"Loco in Acapulco"	Four Tops	7	7 January 1989	2
Singles in 1989
7 January 1989	2	"Four Letter Word"	Kim Wilde	6	14 January 1989	1
14 January 1989	5	"She Drives Me Crazy"	Fine Young Cannibals	5	21 January 1989	2
14 January 1989	1	"All She Wants Is"	Duran Duran	9	14 January 1989	1
14 January 1989	3	"Baby I Love Your Way - Free Bird"	Will to Power	6	21 January 1989	1
21 January 1989	6	"The Living Years"	Mike and the Mechanics	2	28 January 1989	3
21 January 1989	5	"You Got It"	Roy Orbison	3	4 February 1989	2
21 January 1989	1	"Waiting for a Star to Fall"	Boy Meets Girl	9	21 January 1989	1
21 January 1989	6	"Something's Gotten Hold of My Heart" (#6)	Marc Almond featuring Gene Pitney	1	28 January 1989	4
28 January 1989	3	"Cuddly Toy"	Roachford	4	4 February 1989	1
28 January 1989	5	"Love Train"	Holly Johnson	4	11 February 1989	1
4 February 1989	2	"That's the Way Love Is"	Ten City	8	4 February 1989	2
4 February 1989	3	"Wait"	Robert Howard & Kym Mazelle	7	11 February 1989	1
11 February 1989	2	"The Last of the Famous International Playboys"	Morrissey	6	11 February 1989	1
11 February 1989	4	"My Prerogative"	Bobby Brown	6	18 February 1989	2
18 February 1989	4	"Belfast Child"	Simple Minds	1	25 February 1989	2
18 February 1989	5	"Love Changes Everything" ^{[C]}	Michael Ball	2	25 February 1989	2
18 February 1989	2	"Fine Time"	Yazz	9	18 February 1989	2
25 February 1989	3	"Leave Me Alone"	Michael Jackson	2	4 March 1989	1
25 February 1989	5	"Stop"	Sam Brown	4	4 March 1989	2
25 February 1989	1	"Hold Me in Your Arms"	Rick Astley	10	25 February 1989	1
4 March 1989	5	"Help!" ^{[D]}	Bananarama & Lananeeneenoonoo	3	11 March 1989	2
4 March 1989	3	"Hey Music Lover"	S'Express	6	4 March 1989	1
4 March 1989	2	"I Don't Want a Lover"	Texas	8	4 March 1989	1
4 March 1989	7	"Too Many Broken Hearts" (#4)	Jason Donovan	1	11 March 1989	2
4 March 1989	5	"Can't Stay Away from You"	Gloria Estefan & Miami Sound Machine	7	18 March 1989	3
11 March 1989	2	"Blow the House Down"	Living in a Box	10	11 March 1989	2
18 March 1989	6	"Like a Prayer"	Madonna	1	25 March 1989	3
18 March 1989	6	"This Time I Know It's for Real"	Donna Summer	3	25 March 1989	2
18 March 1989	6	"Straight Up"	Paula Abdul	3	8 April 1989	1
25 March 1989	4	"Keep on Movin'"	Soul II Soul featuring Caron Wheeler	5	25 March 1989	2
25 March 1989	3	"Paradise City"	Guns N' Roses	6	1 April 1989	1
25 March 1989	3	"I'd Rather Jack"	The Reynolds Girls	8	1 April 1989	1
1 April 1989	5	"I Beg Your Pardon"	Kon Kan	5	15 April 1989	2
8 April 1989	7	"Eternal Flame" (#3)	The Bangles	1	15 April 1989	4
8 April 1989	1	"I Haven't Stopped Dancing Yet"	Pat and Mick	9	8 April 1989	1
15 April 1989	4	"If You Don't Know Me by Now"	Simply Red	2	15 April 1989	3
15 April 1989	5	"Baby I Don't Care"	Transvision Vamp	3	22 April 1989	2
15 April 1989	5	"Americanos"	Holly Johnson	4	22 April 1989	2
22 April 1989	1	"When Love Comes to Town"	U2 with B.B. King	6	22 April 1989	1
22 April 1989	3	"Good Thing"	Fine Young Cannibals	7	29 April 1989	1
29 April 1989	1	"Lullaby"	The Cure	5	29 April 1989	1
29 April 1989	2	"Who's in the House?"	Beatmasters with MC Merlin	8	29 April 1989	2
29 April 1989	1	"Interesting Drug"	Morrissey	9	29 April 1989	1
29 April 1989	1	"Ain't Nobody Better"	Inner City	10	29 April 1989	1
6 May 1989	5	"Hand on Your Heart" (#10)	Kylie Minogue	1	13 May 1989	1
6 May 1989	5	"Requiem"	London Boys	4	13 May 1989	3
6 May 1989	7	"Miss You Like Crazy"	Natalie Cole	2	3 June 1989	1
6 May 1989	3	"Beds Are Burning"	Midnight Oil	6	13 May 1989	1
13 May 1989	3	"I Want It All"	Queen	3	13 May 1989	1
13 May 1989	4	"Bring Me Edelweiss"	Edelweiss	5	27 May 1989	1
13 May 1989	3	"I'm Every Woman (Remix)"	Chaka Khan	8	13 May 1989	2
20 May 1989	4	"Ferry Cross the Mersey" ^{[E]}	The Christians, Holly Johnson, Paul McCartney, Gerry Marsden & Stock Aitken Waterman	1	20 May 1989	3
20 May 1989	2	"The Look"	Roxette	7	27 May 1989	1
27 May 1989	2	"Every Little Step"	Bobby Brown	6	27 May 1989	1
27 May 1989	4	"Manchild"	Neneh Cherry	5	3 June 1989	1
3 June 1989	2	"On the Inside" ^{[F]}	Lynne Hamilton	3	3 June 1989	1
3 June 1989	3	"I Don't Wanna Get Hurt"	Donna Summer	7	3 June 1989	1
3 June 1989	4	"Express Yourself"	Madonna	5	10 June 1989	2
10 June 1989	4	"Sealed with a Kiss"	Jason Donovan	1	10 June 1989	2
10 June 1989	3	"The Best of Me"	Cliff Richard	2	10 June 1989	2
10 June 1989	4	"Right Back Where We Started From"	Sinitta	4	17 June 1989	2
10 June 1989	3	"Sweet Child o' Mine"	Guns N' Roses	6	17 June 1989	1
17 June 1989	7	"Back to Life (However Do You Want Me)" (#5)	Soul II Soul featuring Caron Wheeler	1	24 June 1989	4
17 June 1989	4	"I Drove All Night"	Cyndi Lauper	7	24 June 1989	2
24 June 1989	4	"Batdance"	Prince	2	1 July 1989	1
24 June 1989	3	"All I Want Is You"	U2	4	1 July 1989	1
24 June 1989	5	"Song for Whoever"	The Beautiful South	2	8 July 1989	1
1 July 1989	4	"Licence to Kill"	Gladys Knight	6	8 July 1989	1
1 July 1989	1	"It is Time to Get Funky"	D Mob featuring LRS	9	1 July 1989	1
1 July 1989	1	"Joy and Pain"	Donna Allen	10	1 July 1989	1
8 July 1989	5	"London Nights"	London Boys	2	22 July 1989	1
8 July 1989	3	"It's Alright"	Pet Shop Boys	5	8 July 1989	2
8 July 1989	1	"Breakthru"	Queen	7	8 July 1989	1
8 July 1989	1	"Patience"	Guns N' Roses	10	8 July 1989	1
15 July 1989	6	"You'll Never Stop Me Loving You"	Sonia	1	22 July 1989	2
15 July 1989	5	"Ain't Nobody (Remix)"	Rufus & Chaka Khan	6	15 July 1989	2
15 July 1989	5	"On Our Own"	Bobby Brown	4	22 July 1989	1
15 July 1989	4	"Wind Beneath My Wings"	Bette Midler	5	22 July 1989	1
22 July 1989	5	"Don't Wanna Lose You"	Gloria Estefan	6	29 July 1989	3
29 July 1989	3	"Too Much"	Bros	2	29 July 1989	1
29 July 1989	8	"Swing the Mood" (#2)	Jive Bunny and the Mastermixers	1	5 August 1989	5
29 July 1989	6	"French Kiss"	Lil Louis	2	19 August 1989	1
5 August 1989	5	"Wouldn't Change a Thing"	Kylie Minogue	2	5 August 1989	2
12 August 1989	5	"Poison"	Alice Cooper	2	26 August 1989	1
12 August 1989	5	"Toy Soldiers"	Martika	5	19 August 1989	3
19 August 1989	2	"Losing My Mind"	Liza Minnelli	6	19 August 1989	1
19 August 1989	2	"You're History"	Shakespears Sister	7	19 August 1989	1
19 August 1989	5	"Blame It on the Boogie"	Big Fun	4	9 September 1989	1
26 August 1989	11	"Ride on Time" (#1)	Black Box	1	9 September 1989	6
26 August 1989	3	"I Just Don't Have the Heart"	Cliff Richard	3	2 September 1989	1
2 September 1989	2	"Hey DJ! I Can't Dance (To That Music You're Playing)"/"Ska Train"	Beatmasters featuring Betty Boo	7	2 September 1989	2
2 September 1989	5	"Sowing the Seeds of Love"	Tears for Fears	5	16 September 1989	1
9 September 1989	3	"Every Day (I Love You More)"	Jason Donovan	2	16 September 1989	1
9 September 1989	2	"Numero Uno"	Starlight	9	9 September 1989	2
16 September 1989	4	"Right Here Waiting"	Richard Marx	2	23 September 1989	2
16 September 1989	3	"The Time Warp"	Damian	7	16 September 1989	2
16 September 1989	2	"I Need Your Lovin'"	Alyson Williams	8	16 September 1989	1
16 September 1989	4	"The Best"	Tina Turner	5	23 September 1989	2
23 September 1989	3	"Cherish"	Madonna	3	23 September 1989	1
23 September 1989	6	"Pump Up the Jam" (#8)	Technotronic featuring Felly	2	7 October 1989	2
23 September 1989	6	"If Only I Could"	Sydney Youngblood	3	7 October 1989	2
30 September 1989	3	"Drama!"	Erasure	4	7 October 1989	1
30 September 1989	3	"You Keep It All In"	The Beautiful South	8	7 October 1989	1
7 October 1989	2	"Sweet Surrender"	Wet Wet Wet	6	7 October 1989	1
7 October 1989	1	"Chocolate Box"	Bros	9	7 October 1989	1
14 October 1989	6	"That's What I Like" (#7)	Jive Bunny and the Mastermixers	1	21 October 1989	3
14 October 1989	6	"Street Tuff"	Rebel MC & Double Trouble	3	28 October 1989	1
14 October 1989	4	"We Didn't Start the Fire"	Billy Joel	7	21 October 1989	1
14 October 1989	7	"Girl I'm Gonna Miss You"	Milli Vanilli	2	28 October 1989	3
21 October 1989	4	"Leave a Light On"	Belinda Carlisle	4	28 October 1989	1
21 October 1989	4	"If I Could Turn Back Time"	Cher	6	28 October 1989	1
21 October 1989	1	"Wishing on a Star"	Fresh 4 featuring Lizz E	10	21 October 1989	1
28 October 1989	3	"Room in Your Heart"	Living in a Box	5	4 November 1989	1
4 November 1989	6	"All Around the World"	Lisa Stansfield	1	11 November 1989	2
4 November 1989	1	"The Road to Hell (Part 2)"	Chris Rea	10	4 November 1989	1
11 November 1989	3	"Never Too Late"	Kylie Minogue	4	11 November 1989	2
11 November 1989	3	"I Feel the Earth Move"	Martika	7	11 November 1989	2
11 November 1989	4	"Another Day in Paradise"	Phil Collins	2	18 November 1989	1
18 November 1989	7	"You Got It (The Right Stuff)" ^{[G]}	New Kids on the Block	1	25 November 1989	3
18 November 1989	7	"Don't Know Much"	Linda Ronstadt & Aaron Neville	2	2 December 1989	2
18 November 1989	2	"Grand Piano"	Mixmaster	9	18 November 1989	1
25 November 1989	1	"Infinite Dreams (Live)"	Iron Maiden	6	25 November 1989	1
25 November 1989	3	"Homely Girl"	UB40	6	2 December 1989	2
2 December 1989	3	"The Eve of the War (Ben Liebrand Remix)"	Jeff Wayne	3	9 December 1989	1
2 December 1989	7	"Lambada"	Kaoma	4	9 December 1989	1
2 December 1989	2	"Fools Gold"/"What the World Is Waiting For"	The Stone Roses	8	2 December 1989	1
2 December 1989	2	"Can't Shake the Feeling"	Big Fun	8	9 December 1989	1
2 December 1989	1	"Pacific State"	808 State	10	2 December 1989	1
9 December 1989	7	"Get a Life"	Soul II Soul	3	16 December 1989	3
9 December 1989	7	"When You Come Back to Me"	Jason Donovan	2	16 December 1989	3
16 December 1989	4	"Let's Party"	Jive Bunny and the Mastermixers	1	16 December 1989	1
16 December 1989	3	"I Don't Wanna Lose You"	Tina Turner	8	16 December 1989	3
16 December 1989	5	"Dear Jessie"	Madonna	5	30 December 1989	3
16 December 1989	4	"Donald Where's Your Troosers?"	Andy Stewart	4	30 December 1989	1
23 December 1989	4	"Do They Know It's Christmas?" (#9) ^{[H]}	Band Aid II	1	23 December 1989	3
30 December 1989	1	"Sister"	Bros	10	30 December 1989	1

== Entries by artist ==
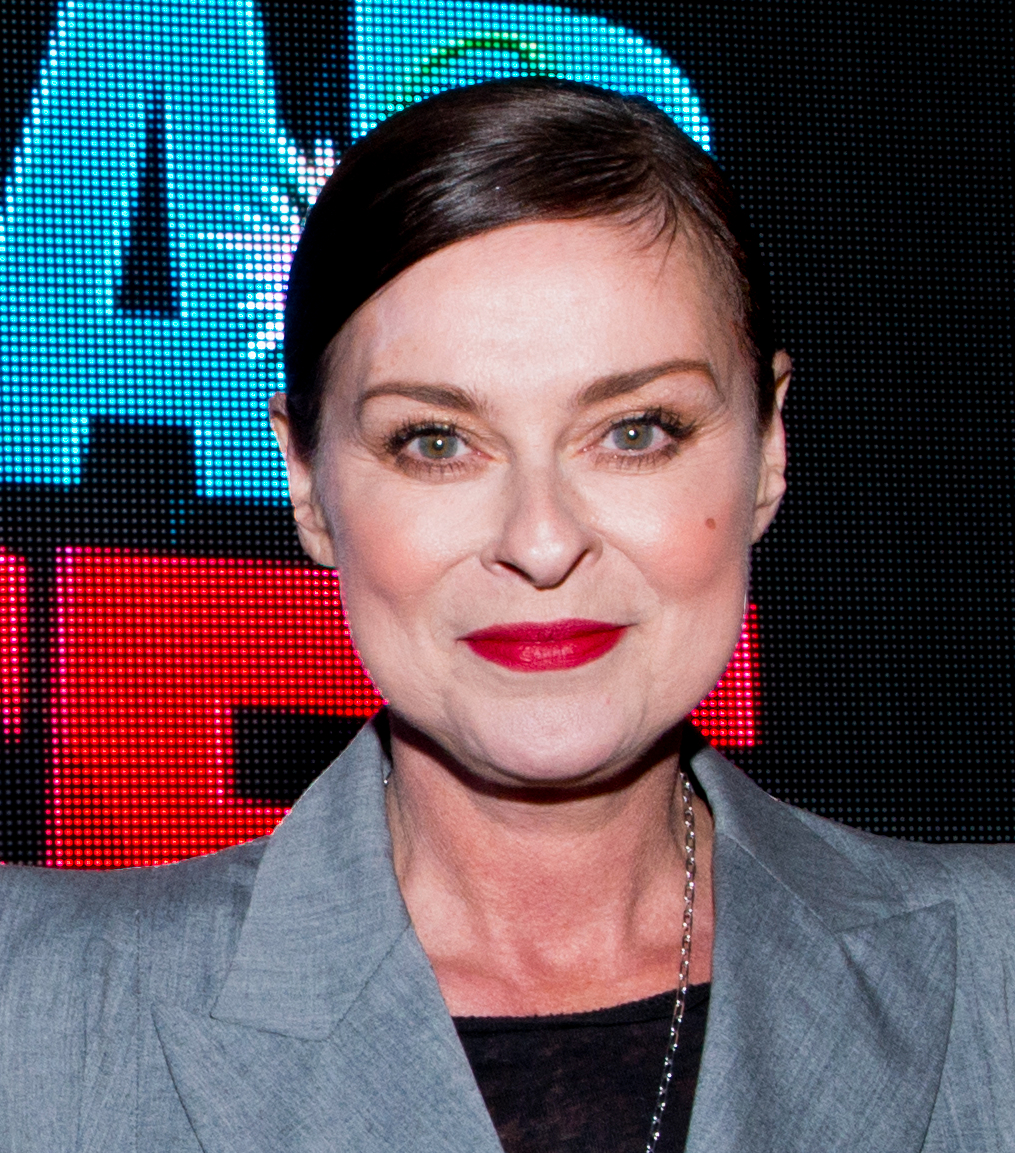
Lisa Stansfield (pictured in 2014) achieved her first top 10 hit in the UK in 1989 with "All Around the World", which spent two weeks at number-one.

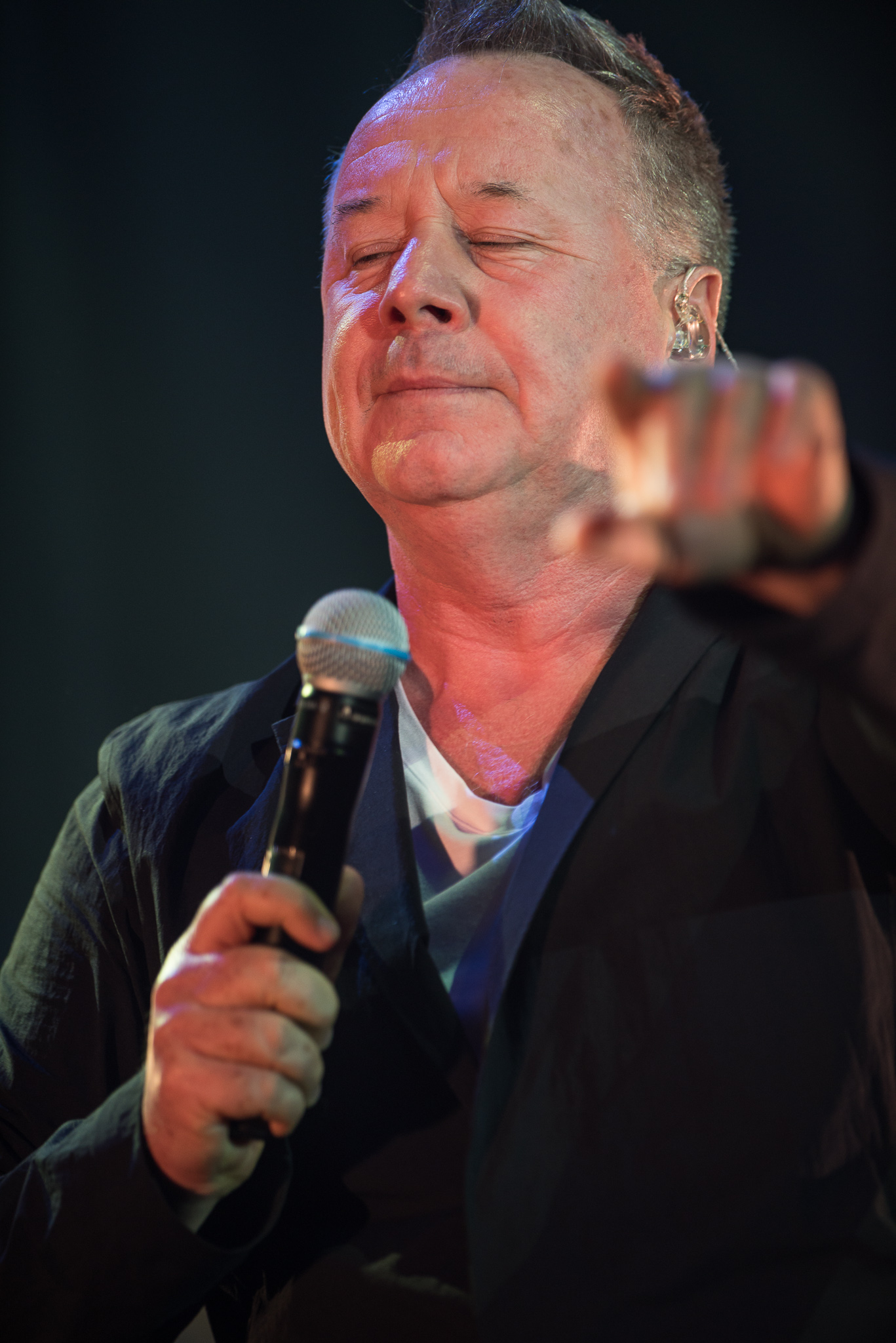
Scottish band Simple Minds (lead singer Jim Kerr pictured in 2017) achieved their first and only number-one hit in the UK in February this year with "Belfast Child". Taken from the band's EP Ballad of the Streets, the song focuses on The Troubles in Northern Ireland and borrows the music from the traditional Irish folk ballad "She Moved Through the Fair".

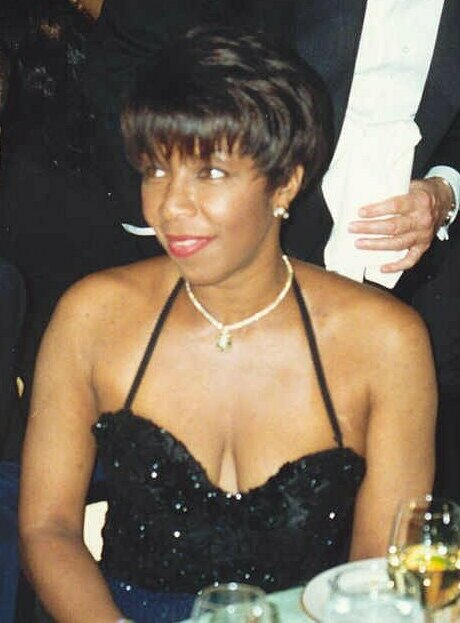
Natalie Cole (pictured in 1992) secured her highest charting UK single in 1989 with "Miss You Like Crazy", which lasted seven weeks in the top 10 and peaked at number two.

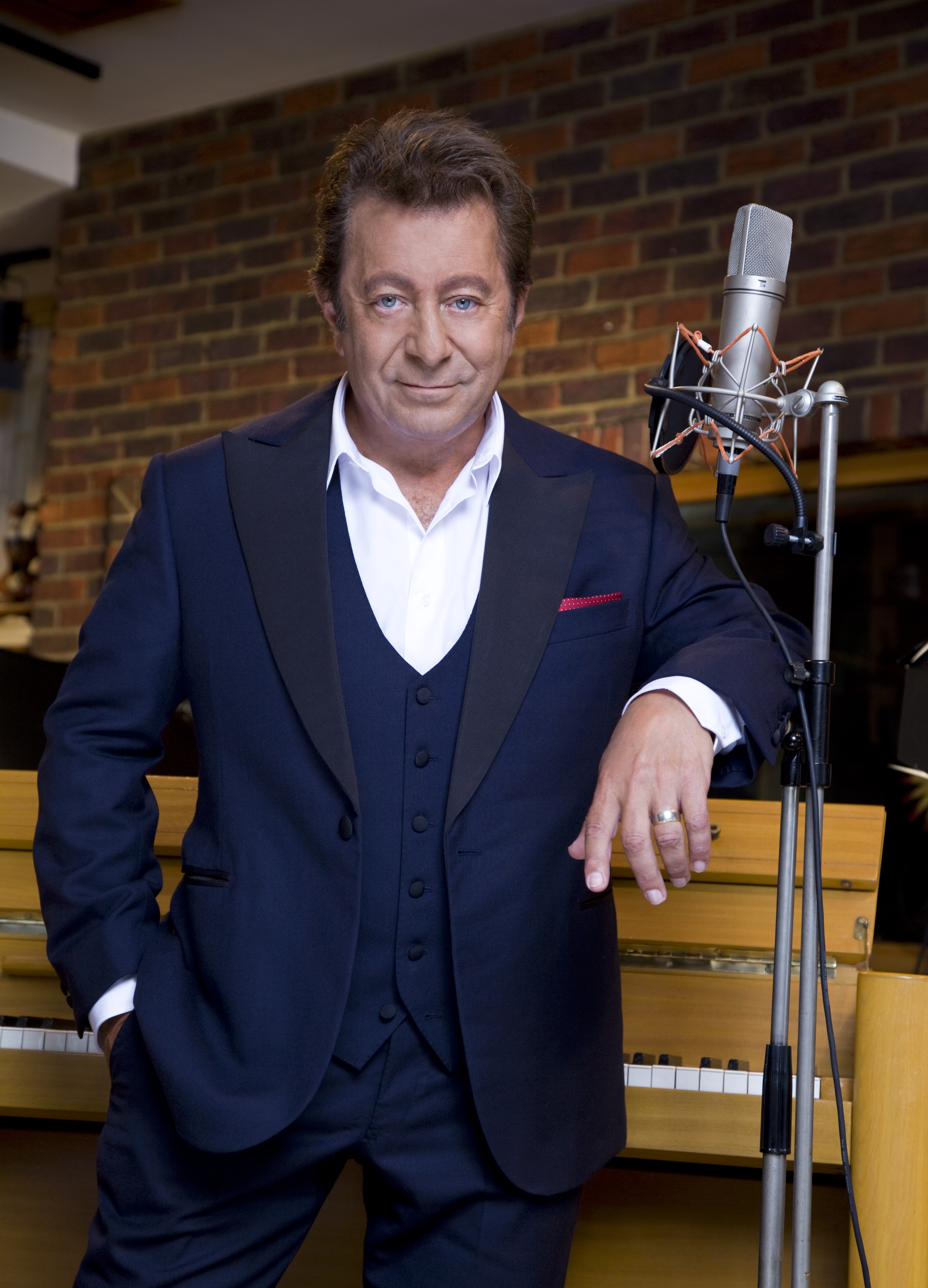
American-born composer Jeff Wayne (pictured in 2014) achieved his only UK top 10 hit in November this year with a Ben Liebrand remix of "The Eve of the War", taken from the concept album Jeff Wayne's Musical Version of The War of the Worlds.

The following table shows artists who achieved two or more top 10 entries in 1989, including singles that reached their peak in 1988. The figures include both main artists and featured artists, while appearances on ensemble charity records are also counted for each artist.

Entries	Artist	Weeks	Singles
6	Jason Donovan ^{[I]}^{[J]}	25	"Do They Know It's Christmas?", "Especially for You", "Every Day (I Love You More)", "Sealed with a Kiss", "Too Many Broken Hearts", "When You Come Back to Me"
5	Kylie Minogue ^{[I]}^{[J]}	20	"Do They Know It's Christmas?", "Especially for You", "Hand on Your Heart", "Never Too Late", "Wouldn't Change a Thing"
5	Luke Goss ^{[J]}^{[K]}^{[L]}	8	"Cat Among the Pigeons/"Silent Night", "Chocolate Box", "Do They Know It's Christmas?", "Sister", "Too Much"
5	Matt Goss ^{[J]}^{[K]}^{[L]}	8	"Cat Among the Pigeons/"Silent Night", "Chocolate Box", "Do They Know It's Christmas?", "Sister", "Too Much"
4	Bros ^{[L]}	6	"Cat Among the Pigeons/"Silent Night", "Chocolate Box", "Sister", "Too Much"
4	Cliff Richard ^{[J]}^{[L]}	9	"Do They Know It's Christmas?", "I Just Don't Have the Heart", "Mistletoe and Wine", "The Best of Me"
4	Holly Johnson ^{[M]}	14	"Americanos", "Ferry Cross the Mersey", "Love Train"
4	Madonna	16	"Cherish", "Dear Jessie", "Express Yourself", "Like a Prayer"
3	Bobby Brown	11	"Every Little Step", "My Prerogative", "On Our Own"
3	Guns N' Roses	7	"Paradise City", "Patience", "Sweet Child o' Mine"
3	Jason John ^{[J]}^{[N]}	9	"Blame It on the Boogie", "Can't Shake the Feeling", "Do They Know It's Christmas?"
3	Jive Bunny and the Mastermixers	17	"Let's Party", "Swing the Mood", "That's What I Like"
3	Mark Gillespie ^{[J]}^{[N]}	9	"Blame It on the Boogie", "Can't Shake the Feeling", "Do They Know It's Christmas?"
3	Phil Creswick ^{[J]}^{[N]}	9	"Blame It on the Boogie", "Can't Shake the Feeling", "Do They Know It's Christmas?"
3	Soul II Soul	15	"Back to Life (However Do You Want Me)", "Get a Life", "Keep on Movin'"
2	Beatmasters	4	"Hey DJ! I Can't Dance to That Music You're Playing"/"Ska Train", "Who's in the House?"
2	Big Fun	7	"Blame It on the Boogie", "Can't Shake the Feeling"
2	The Beautiful South	8	"Song for Whoever", "You Keep It All In"
2	Caron Wheeler	11	"Back to Life (However Do You Want Me)", "Keep on Movin'"
2	Chaka Khan	8	"Ain't Nobody (Remix)", "I'm Every Woman (Remix)"
2	Chris Rea ^{[J]}	3	"Do They Know It's Christmas?", "The Road to Hell (Part 2)"
2	D Mob ^{[J]}	3	"Do They Know It's Christmas?", "It is Time to Get Funky"
2	Donna Summer	9	"I Don't Wanna Get Hurt", "This Time I Know It's for Real"
2	Erasure ^{[I]}	8	"Crackers International (EP)", "Drama!"
2	Fine Young Cannibals	8	"Good Thing", "She Drives Me Crazy"
2	Gloria Estefan	10	"Can't Stay Away from You", "Don't Wanna Lose You"
2	Graeme Clark ^{[J]}^{[O]}	4	"Do They Know It's Christmas?", "Sweet Surrender"
2	Inner City ^{[I]}	4	"Ain't Nobody Better", "Good Life"
2	Keren Woodward ^{[J]}^{[P]}	7	"Do They Know It's Christmas?", "Help!"
2	Lisa Stansfield ^{[J]}	8	"All Around the World", "Do They Know It's Christmas?"
2	Living in a Box	5	"Blow the House Down", "Room in Your Heart"
2	London Boys	10	"London Nights", "Requiem"
2	Martika	11	"I Feel the Earth Move", "Toy Soldiers"
2	Marti Pellow ^{[J]}^{[O]}	4	"Do They Know It's Christmas?", "Sweet Surrender"
2	Matt Aitken ^{[J]}^{[M]}	6	"Do They Know It's Christmas?", "Ferry Cross the Mersey"
2	Mike Stock ^{[J]}^{[M]}	6	"Do They Know It's Christmas?", "Ferry Cross the Mersey"
2	Morrissey	3	"Interesting Drug", "The Last of the Famous International Playboys"
2	Neil Mitchell ^{[J]}^{[O]}	4	"Do They Know It's Christmas?", "Sweet Surrender"
2	Neneh Cherry ^{[I]}	8	"Buffalo Stance", "Manchild"
2	Queen	4	"Breakthru", "I Want It All"
2	Sara Dallin ^{[J]}^{[P]}	7	"Do They Know It's Christmas?", "Help!"
2	Siobhan Fahey ^{[J]}^{[P]}	7	"Do They Know It's Christmas?", "Help!"
2	Sonia ^{[J]}	8	"Do They Know It's Christmas?", "You'll Never Stop Me Loving You"
2	Technotronic ^{[J]}	8	"Do They Know It's Christmas?", "Pump Up the Jam"
2	Tina Turner	7	"I Don't Wanna Lose You", "The Best"
2	Tommy Cunningham ^{[J]}^{[O]}	4	"Do They Know It's Christmas?", "Sweet Surrender"
2	U2	4	"All I Want Is You", "When Love Comes to Town"

== Notes ==
- ^{a} Caron Wheeler was credited as a featured artist on the Soul II Soul songs "Back to Life (However Do You Want Me)" and "Keep on Movin'", and a main artist on "Get a Life".
- ^{b} Mixmaster and Starlight were two aliases used by members of Black Box but are counted as separate acts.
- ^{c} "Love Changes Everything" is a song from the Andrew Lloyd Webber stage musical Aspects of Love.
- ^{d} Lananeeneenoonoo's name was a parody of Bananarama. The group's lineup included comedians Dawn French, Jennifer Saunders and Kathy Burke.
- ^{e} Released as a charity single to support families of victims of the Hillsborough Disaster.
- ^{f} "On the Inside" was the theme song to the Australian television series Prisoner: Cell Block H.
- ^{g} "You Got It (The Right Stuff)" re-entered the top 10 at number 10 on 6 January 1990 (week ending).
- ^{h} Released as a charity single by Band Aid to aid the continuing efforts towards famine relief in Ethiopia.
- ^{i} Figure includes single that first charted in 1988 but peaked in 1989.
- ^{j} Figure includes an appearance on the "Do They Know It's Christmas?" charity single by Band Aid II.
- ^{k} Figure includes four top 10 hits with the group Bros.
- ^{l} Figure includes single that peaked in 1988.
- ^{m} Figure includes an appearance on the "Ferry Cross the Mersey" charity single.
- ^{n} Figure includes two top 10 hits with the group Big Fun.
- ^{o} Figure includes a top 10 hit with the group Wet Wet Wet.
- ^{p} Figure includes a top 10 hit with the group Bananarama.

== See also ==
- 1989 in British music
- List of number-one singles from the 1980s (UK)
