= A Pocketful of Dreams =

Studio album by Big Fun
- Released: 30 April 1990
- Recorded: 1989–1990
- Genre: Dance-pop
- Label: Jive
- Producers: Stock Aitken Waterman; Phil Harding & Ian Curnow; Pete Hammond

A Pocketful of Dreams is the only album by English boy band Big Fun. It was released in 1990 by Jive Records and reached the top 10 of the UK Albums Chart, peaking at No. 7. The album includes the UK top 40 hit singles "Blame It on the Boogie" (a cover of the Jacksons' 1978 hit), "Can't Shake the Feeling" and "Handful of Promises". Also included is their cover of "Hey There Lonely Girl", which was released as a single but stalled at No. 62 in the UK.

In 2010, the album was re-released by the Cherry Pop label, including previously unreleased and rare songs, among them their duet with Sonia, "You've Got a Friend", which was released as a charity single in 1990, and a cover of the unrelated Carole King song of the same name, which both artists also recorded but had never been released.

== Critical reception ==
A review published in Music Week magazine gave a negative review, stating that "it's a sad indictment of the UK public that such mediocre performances can sell in such quantity", and considered the band's inability to reach the high notes on "Hey There Lonely Girl" as a proof of a "severe lack of talent".

== Track listing ==
=== Standard version ===
No.	Title	Writer(s)	Length
1.	"Handful of Promises"	Mike Stock; Matt Aitken; Pete Waterman	3:12
2.	"Blame It on the Boogie" (12" Remix)	Mick Jackson; Dave Jackson; Elmar Krohn	6:08
3.	"Can't Shake the Feeling"	Stock; Aitken; Waterman	3:39
4.	"Fight for the Right to Party"	Phil Creswick; Jason John; Mark Gillespie; Mark Sayfritz; Victoria Wilson-James	4:46
5.	"Not That Kinda Guy"	Creswick; John; Gillespie; Sayfritz; Wilson-James	3:20
6.	"We're in This Love Forever"	Stock; Aitken; Waterman	3:25
7.	"Why Did You Break My Heart"	Creswick; John; Gillespie; Martin Abbott; Judith Walmsley	3:08
8.	"Bring Your Love Back"	Creswick; John; Gillespie; Sayfritz; Wilson-James	4:06
9.	"The Heaven I Need"	Stock; Aitken; Waterman	3:36
10.	"Hey There Lonely Girl"	Leon Carr; Earl Shuman	3:40

CD and cassette bonus track

No.	Title	Writer(s)	Length
11.	"I Feel the Earth Move"	Carole King	3:29

=== 2010 re-release (Cherry Pop Records) ===
1. "Handful of Promises"
2. "Blame It on the Boogie"
3. "Can't Shake the Feeling"
4. "Fight for the Right to Party"
5. "Not That Kinda Guy"
6. "We're in This Love Forever"
7. "Why Did You Break My Heart"
8. "Bring Your Love Back"
9. "The Heaven I Need"
10. "Hey There Lonely Girl"
11. "You've Got a Friend" (with Sonia)
12. "I Feel the Earth Move" (Club Mix) *
13. "Blame It on the Boogie" (PWL Mix)
14. "Can't Shake the Feeling" (12" Remix) *
15. "Handful of Promises" (12" Version)
16. "I Feel the Earth Move" (The Techno Mix) +
17. "You've Got a Friend" (Carole King cover) (with Sonia) +

+ Previously unreleased
* First time on CD

== Personnel ==
Adapted from the liner notes for the standard version of the album.

Musicians

- Mike Stock – keyboards (tracks 1–3, 6, 10, 11), backing vocals (tracks 1–4, 6, 7, 10, 11)
- Matt Aitken – keyboards (tracks 1–3, 6, 10, 11), guitars
- A Linn – drums (tracks 1–3, 6, 10, 11)
- Mae McKenna – backing vocals (tracks 1–4, 6, 7, 10, 11)
- Miriam Stockley – backing vocals (tracks 1–4, 6, 7, 10, 11)
- Pete Hammond – keyboards (tracks 5, 8, 9), synthesizers (tracks 5, 8, 9)
- Gordon Dennis – drums & percussion (tracks 5, 8, 9)
- Roddy Mathews – backing vocals (tracks 5, 8, 9)
- Suzanne Rhatigan – backing vocals (tracks 5, 8, 9)
- Ian Curnow – keyboards (tracks 4, 7), bass guitar (tracks 4, 7), backing vocals (tracks 4, 7)
- Phil Harding – drums (tracks 4, 7)
- Bill Clift – backing vocals (tracks 4, 7)
- Patrick Booth – backing vocals (tracks 4, 7)
- Victoria Wilson-James – backing vocals (tracks 4, 7)

Technical

- Stock Aitken Waterman – producer (tracks 1–3, 6, 10)
- Phil Harding – producer (tracks 4, 7, 11), engineer (tracks 4, 7), mixing (tracks 1, 4, 7)
- Ian Curnow – producer (tracks 4, 7, 11), engineer (tracks 4, 7)
- Pete Hammond – producer (tracks 5, 8, 9)
- Karen Hewitt – engineer (all tracks)
- Yoyo – engineer (tracks 2, 3)
- Gordon Dennis – engineer (tracks 5, 8, 9)
- Dave Ford – mixing (tracks 2–6, 8–11)
- Jason Barron, Peter Day, Julian Gingell, Chris McDonnell, Leslie Sharma, Barry Stone, Paul Waterman – assistants
- Recorded & mixed at PWL Studios, London
- Johnathan Elliott – art direction & design
- Simon Fowler – photography
- Paul Postle – assistant
- Pam Trigg – styling
- Katya Thomas – makeup

== Charts ==
Weekly chart performance for A Pocketful of Dreams
Chart (1990)	Peak Position
European Albums (European Albums Chart)	26
Finnish Albums (Suomen virallinen lista)	36
German Albums (Media Control Charts)	39
Spanish Albums (PROMUSICAE)	12
UK Albums (Official Charts)	7

== Certifications ==
Certifications for A Pocketful of Dreams
Region	Certification	Certified units/sales
Spain (Promusicae)	Platinum	100,000^{^}
United Kingdom (BPI)	Gold	100,000^{^}
^{^} Shipments figures based on certification alone.
