= Everybody Knows (Sonia album) =

Studio album by Sonia
- Released: 23 April 1990
- Recorded: 1989–1990
- Genre: Dance-pop
- Length: 33:16
- Label: Chrysalis
- Producers: Stock Aitken Waterman; Phil Harding; Ian Curnow

Sonia chronology
Everybody Knows (1990)	Sonia (1991)

Singles from Everybody Knows
- 1. "You'll Never Stop Me Loving You" Released: 12 June 1989; 2. "Can't Forget You" Released: 25 September 1989; 3. "Listen to Your Heart" Released: 27 November 1989; 4. "Counting Every Minute" Released: 26 March 1990; 5. "End of the World" Released: 13 August 1990

Everybody Knows is the debut album by English dance-pop singer Sonia, released in April 1990. The album was predominantly written and produced by Stock Aitken Waterman and includes the UK and Irish number one single "You'll Never Stop Me Loving You" and the UK top 20 hits "Can't Forget You", "Listen to Your Heart", "Counting Every Minute", and "End of the World". At the time of release, Sonia became the first female UK artist to achieve five top 20 hit singles from one album. Everybody Knows was re-issued by Cherry Red Records in October 2010 in remastered and expanded form.

== Critical reception ==
A review in Pan-European magazine Music & Media noted that as a Stock, Aitken & Waterman production, the album "style will come as no surprise - persistent, bubbling dance grooves topped off by the ultimate girl-next-door voice", and added that "every track is a potential single". A review published in Music Week magazine stated that Sonia "slips through more SAW-inspired teenage drama, all lost love and yearning, but (is) always bubbly and strangely celebratory" and deemed the album offers a "pop at its most simple and all the more engagingly harmless".

== Chart performance ==
Everybody Knows entered the UK albums chart at its peak of number seven on 5 May 1990 and spent ten weeks in the top 100, two of them in the top ten. It was certified gold by the British Phonographic Industry for sales exceeding 100,000 copies. On the overall European Top 100 Albums, it started at number 27, its highest position, on 12 May 1990. In Australia, the album peaked at number 144 on the ARIA albums chart. Sonia had a further UK top 20 single in 1990, with "You've Got a Friend", recorded with Big Fun, in aid of ChildLine. Despite her chart success, the record company Chrysalis ended their recording contract with Sonia following the album.

== Track listing ==
All tracks are written by and produced by Stock Aitken Waterman, except where noted.

Side one
No.	Title	Writer(s)	Producer(s)	Length
1.	"You'll Never Stop Me Loving You"			3:22
2.	"Everybody Knows"			3:27
3.	"Listen to Your Heart"			3:25
4.	"Someone Like You"	Phil Harding; Ian Curnow; Bill Clift	Harding; Curnow	3:52
5.	"Counting Every Minute"			3:33

Side two
No.	Title	Writer(s)	Producer(s)	Length
6.	"Can't Forget You"			3:25
7.	"Now I'm Without You"	Harding; Curnow; Clift	Harding; Curnow	3:29
8.	"Can't Help the Way That I Feel"			3:30
9.	"Climb to the Top of a Mountain"	Harding; Curnow; Clift	Harding; Curnow	3:37
10.	"End of the World" (Skeeter Davis cover)	Arthur Kent; Sylvia Dee		3:36
Total length:				33:16

CD bonus track
No.	Title	Length
11.	"You'll Never Stop Me Loving You" (Kiss mix)	6:42
Total length:		42:15

2010 re-release bonus tracks
No.	Title	Writer(s)	Length
11.	"Better Than Ever"		3:29
12.	"You'll Never Stop Me Loving You" (extended version)		7:59
13.	"Can't Forget You" (extended version)		6:07
14.	"Listen to Your Heart" (extended version)		5:57
15.	"Counting Every Minute" (The King's Counting House mix)		6:59
16.	"You'll Never Stop Me Loving You" (XXX Kiss mix)		8:08
17.	"Let's Have a Party" (Elvis Presley cover)	Jessie Mae Robinson	2:06
18.	"You'll Never Stop Me Loving You" (demo version)		3:26
Total length:			79:42

== Charts ==
1990 weekly chart performance for Everybody Knows
Chart (1990)	Peak position
Australia (ARIA Charts)	144
Europe (European Top 100 Albums)	27
UK Singles (Official Charts)	7

== Certifications ==
Certifications for Everybody Knows
Region	Certification	Certified units/sales
United Kingdom (BPI)	Gold	100,000^{^}
^{^} Shipments figures based on certification alone.
