= Listen to Your Heart (Sonia song) =

1989 single by Sonia

Single by Sonia

from the album Everybody Knows
- B-side: "Better Than Ever"
- Released: 27 November 1989
- Recorded: 1989
- Genre: Dance-pop
- Length: 3:26: 3:17 (video version)
- Label: Chrysalis
- Songwriters: Mike Stock; Matt Aitken; Pete Waterman
- Producer: Stock Aitken Waterman

Sonia singles chronology
"Can't Forget You" (1989)	"Listen to Your Heart" (1989)	"Counting Every Minute" (1990)

Music video
- "Listen to Your Heart" on YouTube

"Listen to Your Heart" is a song written, arranged and produced by Stock Aitken Waterman (SAW) for Sonia's debut studio album, Everybody Knows (1990). Released in November 1989 as the album's third single, it reached number ten on the UK Singles Chart and number 22 in Ireland. The B-side was Sonia's version of "Better Than Ever" which was originally recorded by Lisa Fabien and was not included on the original release of her debut album.

== Music video ==
The song's video features an uncredited appearance by fellow SAW act Big Fun, who appear as faceless dancers. The video also features Sonia dancing in front of a red and a blue background. The track and the singer were later parodied by comedian Dawn French on her sketch comedy show, French and Saunders, a moment Sonia later described as the most embarrassing of her life.

== Critical reception ==
Generally critical of SAW-produced singles, David Giles of Music Week praised "Listen to Your Heart", calling it a "fine song" which he considered "a hundred times better than ["You'll Never Stop Me Loving You"]", adding: "The chorus is standard fare, but the verse simmers nicely". In 2017, Christian Guiltenane of British magazine Attitude praised this Sonia song as being "by far her best, with its infectious euphoric sing-song chorus".

== Chart performance ==
"Listen to Your Heart" entered the UK Singles Chart in early December 1989 at number 42 and peaked at number ten five weeks later, thus becoming Sonia's second UK top ten hit after her debut single "You'll Never Stop Me Loving You", and charted for a total of ten weeks. The track was Sonia's last collaboration with SAW to make the UK singles top ten, preceding the broader collapse in the producers' chart fortunes in 1990. Despite its good chart performances in the UK and a peak at number 16 in Finland, it missed the top 20 in all other countries where it was released. In Ireland, it charted for one week in January 1990, at number 22. In France, it barely made the top 40, reaching number 39 in the fourth week out of a six-week chart run, while in Germany, it stalled at number 72 and was present in the top 100 for six weeks. On the Pan-European Hot 100 singles compiled by Music & Media, it debuted at a peak of number 27, while it reached number 17 on the European Airplay chart in its second week; on both charts, it charted for four weeks. Outside Europe, "Listen to Your Heart" peaked at number 119 in March 1990 in Australia, spending nine weeks on the chart.

== Appearances in other media ==
In Brazil, "Listen to Your Heart" was included in the international soundtrack of Rainha da Sucata becoming a big hit there. Similarly, in the Philippines, the song was used in the show It's a Date, a dating comedy game hosted by Plinky Recto and Tom Lupton, formerly aired on CNN Philippines (Formerly RPN 9) in 1989, and thus became popular in the country.

== Track listings ==
- 7" / Cassette single
1. "Listen to Your Heart" – 3:25
2. "Better than Ever" – 3:29
- 12" / CD maxi
1. "Listen to Your Heart" (Extended Mix) – 5:58
2. "Better than Ever" – 3:29
3. "Listen to Your Heart" – 3:27

== Credits and personnel ==
The following people contributed to "Listen to Your Heart":

- Sonia – lead vocals
- Mae McKenna, Miriam Stockley – backing vocals
- Mike Stock – keyboards, backing vocals
- Matt Aitken – guitars, keyboards
- A Linn – drums
- Dave Ford – mixing

== Charts ==
=== Weekly charts ===
Weekly chart performance
Chart (1989–1990)	Peak position
Australia (ARIA Charts)	119
Europe (Eurochart Hot 100)	27
Europe (European Airplay Top 50)	17
Finland (Suomen virallinen lista)	16
France (SNEP)	39
Ireland (IRMA)	22
Luxembourg (Radio Luxembourg)	6
UK Singles (OCC)	10
UK Dance (Music Week)	34
UK (Airplay Top 20)	4
West Germany (GfK)	72

=== Year-end charts ===
Year-end chart performance
Chart (1990)	Position
Brazil (Mais Tocadas)	79
