= Jason John =

Jason John may refer to:

- Jason Herbert (born 1967), also known as Jason John, British musician, member of Big Fun
- Jason John (athlete) (born 1971), British sprinter
