= Can't Forget You (Sonia song) =

1989 single by Sonia

Single by Sonia

from the album Everybody Knows
- Released: 25 September 1989
- Studio: PWL 1 and 4 (London, England)
- Genre: Pop
- Length: 3:25
- Label: Chrysalis
- Songwriter: Stock Aitken Waterman
- Producer: Stock Aitken Waterman

Sonia singles chronology
"You'll Never Stop Me Loving You" (1989)	"Can't Forget You" (1989)	"Listen to Your Heart" (1989)

"Can't Forget You" is a song by English singer Sonia, released as her second single in September 1989. The mid-tempo song later appeared on her debut album, Everybody Knows, released in 1990. It was a moderate hit on the chart, reaching number 17 in UK and number five in Ireland.

== Background and writing ==
Contrary to fan speculation, "Can't Forget You" was written specifically for Sonia by Stock Aitken Waterman (SAW) and thus was not initially offered to, nor recorded by, Kylie Minogue. It was written after Sonia had spoken with Mike Stock about her relationships.

== Critical reception ==
Richard Lowe from Smash Hits wrote, "I think they're splendid [ SAW ] and Sonia's first single was probably the best all year. This one's not quite as catchy and won't do half as well but it's a good tune, well sung, nevertheless." Gary James of Entertainment Focus said almost the same thing: to him, "Can't Forget You" is "unmistakably a SAW production" and a "mid-tempo bop", but considered that it was "slightly more downbeat and mellow than [the previous single]". A review in Pan-European magazine Music & Media said the song is a "harmless lightweight disco".

== Chart performance ==
"Can't Forget You" was less-successful than Sonia's debut single, "You'll Never Stop Me Loving You"; in the UK, it debuted at number 27 on 7 October 1989, peaked at number 17 the next week and spent six weeks in the top 75. However, it fared better in Ireland where it reached number five and appeared for three weeks on the chart. In addition, it was a top 20 hit in Finland, but stalled at number 47 in the Flanders region of Belgium. On the overall Eurochart Hot 100 compiled by the Music & Media magazine, it reached number 51 in its second week out of a five-week chart run. In Australia, "Can't Forget You" barely made the top 100 on the ARIA singles chart, peaking at number 98. Following the underperformance of Donna Summer's "Love's About To Change My Heart", the surprisingly poor chart showing of "Can't Forget You" has been cited as among the first significant signs of SAW's looming commercial implosion over the following 12 months.

== Formats and track listings ==
- Cassette / 7" single
1. "Can't Forget You" - 3:25
2. "Can't Forget You" (Instrumental) - 3:25
- 12" / CD maxi
1. "Can't Forget You" (Extended Mix) - 6:05
2. "Can't Forget You" (Instrumental) - 3:25
3. "Can't Forget You" - 3:25

== Credits and personnel ==
The following people contributed to "Can't Forget You":

- Sonia - lead vocals
- Mae McKenna, Miriam Stockley - backing vocals
- Mike Stock - keyboards
- Matt Aitken - guitars, keyboards
- A Linn - drums
- Dave Ford - mixing

== Charts ==
Weekly chart performance for "Can't Forget You"
Chart (1989–1990)	Peak position
Australia (ARIA)	98
Belgium (Ultratop 50 Flanders)	47
Europe (Eurochart Hot 100)	51
Finland (Suomen virallinen lista)	19
Ireland (IRMA)	5
Luxembourg (Radio Luxembourg)	13
UK Singles (OCC)	17
UK Dance (Music Week)	21
