= Sonia (album) =

Studio album by Sonia
- Released: 7 October 1991
- Recorded: 1991
- Genre: Pop
- Length: 42:39
- Label: I.Q. Records
- Producer: Nigel Wright

Sonia chronology
Everybody Knows (1990)	Sonia (1991)	Better the Devil You Know (1993)

Singles from Sonia
- 1. "Only Fools (Never Fall in Love)" Released: 20 May 1991; 2. "Be Young, Be Foolish, Be Happy" Released: 19 August 1991; 3. "You to Me Are Everything" Released: 4 November 1991

Professional ratings
Review scores
Source	Rating
AllMusic	3/5 stars

Sonia is the second album by British pop star Sonia, released in October 1991 on I.Q. Records, after parting company with Chrysalis Records and Stock Aitken Waterman. Sonia's second album was produced by Nigel Wright and for the first time Sonia co-wrote some of the songs. The album consists of some covers and some original material.

The album features the singles "Only Fools (Never Fall in Love)", "Be Young, Be Foolish, Be Happy" and "You to Me Are Everything", all of which were top 30 hits in the UK Singles Chart, while the album itself reached No.33.

The album was repackaged and released as a debut album in the US in 1992, while the album was further repackaged and released in Japan, though both versions met with little success. Following this, Sonia was moved to BMG Eurodisc's Arista Records imprint and agreed to take part in the Eurovision Song Contest in 1993.

== Track listing ==
No.	Title	Writer(s)	Length
1.	"Only Fools (Never Fall in Love)"	Tony Hiller; Barry Upton	3:48
2.	"You to Me Are Everything"	Ken Gold; Michael Denne	3:57
3.	"Breakdown"	Adam Pendse; Leee John	3:46
4.	"I'm Not Gonna Play Around No More"	Sonia Evans; Nigel Stock	4:40
5.	"Walk Away Lover"	Peter Crosbie; Yoyo	3:46
6.	"That Boy"	Stock	4:06
7.	"Be Young, Be Foolish, Be Happy"	J. R. Cobb; Ray Whitley	2:57
8.	"Be My Baby"	Stock	3:57
9.	"Used to Be My Love"	Evans; Stock	3:49
10.	"Say Goodbye to Me"	Evans; Paul Robertson	3:49
11.	"Strong Without You"	Stock	4:04
Total length:			42:39

Japanese release bonus tracks
No.	Title	Writer(s)	Length
12.	"You to Me Are Everything" (12 inch version)	Gold; Denne	6:04
13.	"Only Fools (Fall in Love)" (extended club mix)	Hiller; Upton	6:23
Total length:			55:06

== Personnel ==
- Michael Brauer - remixing
- Al Cobb - composer
- Simon Cowe - producer
- Simon Cowell - executive producer
- Paul Cox - photography
- Michael Denne - composer
- Ken Gold - composer
- Peter Hammond - mixing
- Kelly Johnson - composer
- Jacqueline Murphy - art direction, design
- Adam Pendse - composer
- Robin Sellars - engineer
- Sonia - primary artist, guitar, vocals
- Ray Whitley - composer
- Nigel Wright - producer
