= Counting Every Minute =

1990 single by Sonia

Single by Sonia

from the album Everybody Knows
- Released: March 1990
- Recorded: 1989
- Genre: Dance-pop
- Length: 3:32
- Label: Chrysalis
- Songwriter(s): Mike Stock; Matt Aitken; Pete Waterman
- Producer(s): Stock Aitken Waterman

Sonia singles chronology
"Listen to Your Heart" (1990)	"Counting Every Minute" (1990)	"You've Got a Friend" (1990)

"Counting Every Minute" is a pop-dance song written by Stock Aitken Waterman for Sonia's debut studio album Everybody Knows (1990). Released in late March 1990 as the album's fourth single, it reached number 16 in United Kingdom, thus providing Sonia's fourth top 20 single from a same album, which made the singer the first female UK artist to achieve this feat.

== Critical reception ==
To Gary James of Entertainment Focus, "SAW added hints of New Jack Swing with their trademark bubblegum pop" in "Counting Every Minute", adding that the song is his "favourite" from the album.

== Chart performance ==
"Counting Every Minute" entered the UK Singles Chart at number 41 on 7 May 1990, climbed the following three weeks until reaching number 16, then dropped and charted for a total of seven weeks. It was also a top 20 hit in Finland where it missed the top ten by one place, and Ireland, where it charted from 11 April 1990 and for four weeks, including a peak at number 18. On the overall Eurochart Hot 100 compiled by the Music & Media magazine, it started at number 98 on 14 April 1990, reached a peak of number 41 three weeks later and fell off the top 100 after six weeks of presence. It also appeared for two weeks on the European Airplay Top 50, with a peak at number 36 on 12 May.

== Formats and track listings ==
- CD single
1. "Counting Every Minute" – 3:32
2. "Counting Every Minute" (The Don Miguel Mix) – 6:45
3. "You'll Never Stop Me Loving You" (Sonia's Kiss Mix) – 6:40
- 7" single, Cassette single
1. "Counting Every Minute" – 3:32
2. "Counting Every Minute" (Instrumental) – 3:56
- 12" single
1. "Counting Every Minute" (The Don Miguel Mix) – 6:45
2. "You'll Never Stop Me Loving You" (Sonia's Kiss Mix) – 6:40
3. "Counting Every Minute" – 3:32
- 12" remix
1. "Counting Every Minute" (Tick-Tock Mix) – 7:25
2. "Counting Every Minute" (The Don Miguel Mix) – 6:45
3. "You'll Never Stop Me Loving You" (Sonia's Kiss Mix) – 6:40

== Credits and personnel ==
The following people contributed to "Counting Every Minute":

- Sonia – lead vocals
- Mae McKenna, Miriam Stockley – backing vocals
- Mike Stock – keyboards, backing vocals
- Matt Aitken – guitars, keyboards
- A Linn – drums
- Dave Ford – mixing

== Charts ==
Weekly chart performance for "Counting Every Minute"
Chart (1990)	Peak position
Australia (ARIA)	118
Europe (Eurochart Hot 100)	41
Europe (European Airplay Top 50)	36
Finland (Suomen virallinen lista)	11
Ireland (IRMA)	18
Luxembourg (Radio Luxembourg)	14
UK Singles (OCC)	16
UK (Airplay Top 20)	8
