= Better the Devil You Know (Sonia song) =

British entry for the Eurovision Song Contest 1993

Single by Sonia

from the album Better the Devil You Know
- B-side: "Not What I Call Love"
- Released: 19 April 1993
- Length: 2:36
- Label: Arista
- Songwriters: Brian Teasdale; Dean Collinson
- Producer: Nigel Wright

Sonia singles chronology
"Boogie Nights" (1992)	"Better the Devil You Know" (1993)	"Hopelessly Devoted to You" (1994)

Eurovision Song Contest 1993 entry
- Country: United Kingdom
- Artist: Sonia Evans
- As: Sonia
- Language: English
- Composers: "Red" (Brian Teasdale) and Dean Collinson
- Lyricists: Red and Collinson
- Conductor: Nigel Wright

Finals performance
- Final result: 2nd
- Final points: 164

Entry chronology
- ◄ "One Step Out of Time" (1992)
- "We Will Be Free (Lonely Symphony)" (1994) ►

Official performance video
- "Better the Devil You Know" on YouTube

"Better the Devil You Know" is a song written by Brian Teasdale and Dean Collinson for British singer Sonia. The single was released in April 1993 by Arista as the second and final single from Sonia's third album, Better the Devil You Know (1993). The song was produced by Nigel Wright and represented the United Kingdom at the Eurovision Song Contest 1993, finishing in second place. After Eurovision, the song peaked at number 15 on the UK Singles Chart and stayed in the chart for seven weeks. The B-side is a song called "Not What I Call Love", co-written by Sonia and also on her third album.

== Eurovision Song Contest 1993 ==
For A Song for Europe 1993, the British Broadcasting Corporation (BBC) asked the Head of Delegation of each other participating broadcasters in the Eurovision Song Contest 1993 for their opinion regarding who should represent the United Kingdom from a shortlist the BBC had prepared. A plurality chose 22-year-old recording artist Sonia, who already had a number-one hit to her credit. She then sang eight different songs at the national final. For the second year running, a nationwide telephone vote was held to pick one song. "Better the Devil You Know", the fifth song performed, won with over 156,000 supporters, twice as many as the second-place entry.

On 15 May 1993, the Eurovision Song Contest was held at the Green Glens Arena in Millstreet, Ireland, hosted by Raidió Teilifís Éireann (RTÉ), and broadcast live throughout the continent. Sonia performed the song nineteenth on the evening, after Bosnia and Herzegovina's "Sva bol svijeta" by Fazla, and before the Netherlands' "Vrede" by Ruth Jacott. At the end of judging that evening, "Better the Devil You Know" took the second-place slot with 164 points. Belgium, Iceland, Austria and Israel each awarded the song 12 points. This was the fourth time the UK had ranked second in the voting since 1988 and the fourteenth time overall.

The song was a retro rock 'n' roll offering with a 1950s flair. Sonia tells the story about how in love she is with her boyfriend, wishing he won't hurt her, for her love is true. She lets it known that she would "sell her heart and soul" to get his unconditional love in return, rationalising that it's better that one deal with "the devil you know" (him with his faults) instead of "the devil you don't" (another potential boyfriend).

Commenting on the song, Collinson stated that he'd written the song years before in an attempt to recreate "Wake Me Up Before You Go-Go" by Wham!. The song was played as part of a "Eurovision special" on Top of the Pops 2. As the show's narrator, DJ Steve Wright commented during the song's introduction, "This is a good song, but Sonia is a bit too eager to please, so therefore didn't give it the required 'I don't care too much about Eurovision' attitude", implying that was her downfall.

== Critical reception ==
Pan-European magazine Music & Media commented, "One for the Guinness Book Of Records. With this cheerful song on a Motown beat the UK scored its 14th second place at the Eurovision Songcontest, this time behind Ireland's Niamh Kavanagh."

== Formats and track listings ==
- 7-inch and cassette single
1. "Better the Devil You Know" – 2:36
2. "Not What I Call Love" – 4:08
- 12-inch single
1. "Better the Devil You Know" (extended mix) – 4:20
2. "Not What I Call Love" – 4:08
- CD single
1. "Better the Devil You Know" – 2:36
2. "Better the Devil You Know" (extended mix) – 4:20
3. "Not What I Call Love" – 4:08

== Charts ==
Weekly chart performance for "Better the Devil You Know"
Chart (1993)	Peak position
Belgium (Ultratop 50 Flanders)	46
Europe (Eurochart Hot 100)	53
Germany (Official German Charts)	59
Iceland (Íslenski Listinn Topp 40)	36
Ireland (IRMA)	26
Israel (Israeli Singles Chart)	19
UK Singles (OCC)	15
