= Better the Devil You Know (album) =

Studio album by Sonia
- Released: 17 May 1993
- Recorded: 1992–1993
- Genre: Pop
- Length: 46:35
- Label: Arista
- Producers: Nigel Wright; Mark Taylor; Tracy Ackerman; Mark Cyrus; Ian Levine

Sonia chronology
Sonia (1991)	Better the Devil You Know (1993)	Love Train - The Philly Album (1998)

Singles from Better the Devil You Know
- 1. "Boogie Nights" Released: 31 August 1992; 2. "Better the Devil You Know" Released: 19 April 1993

Professional ratings
Review scores
Source	Rating
Music Week	3/5 stars

Better the Devil You Know is the third album by British pop star Sonia. It was released on the back of her entry into the 1993 Eurovision Song Contest with the title track.

== Overview ==
Released in May 1993, the album followed Sonia's appearance in the Eurovision Song Contest. The previous year, Sonia had been selected to be the UK representative and she performed all eight songs in the Song for Europe. The 1992 participant Michael Ball had enjoyed great success with his album based on the contest when it reached No.1 in the charts, and Sonia's management were keen to see similar results. Better the Devil You Know featured four songs from the contest (the top four placed songs: "A Little Love", "Our World", "So Much of Your Love" and the winner "Better the Devil You Know"). However, the album failed to replicate Ball's success and peaked at No.32 in the charts. The title track however finished a close second in the Contest and reached No.15 on the UK charts.

An earlier single, a cover of the disco hit "Boogie Nights" was also included on the album, while a planned follow-up to the Eurovision song, "Rescue Me" (also a cover) went unreleased. This album marked the end of Sonia's hit-making period, which had lasted since 1989. From this point, Sonia concentrated on TV and stage work, while two more singles and a final album failed to find success.

== Track listing ==
All tracks are produced by Nigel Wright, except where noted.

No.	Title	Writer(s)	Producer(s)	Length
1.	""Better the Devil You Know"	Dean Collinson; Red		2:38
2.	"Young Hearts Run Free" (Candi Staton cover)	Dave Crawford		3:47
3.	"So Much of Your Love"	Patrick McGlynne; Jane Andrews		3:43
4.	"A Little Love"	Phil Harding; Ian Curnow; Shaun Imrie		3:22
5.	"Our World"	Johnny Warman; Nick Graham		2:47
6.	"Set Me on Fire" (Blue Zone cover)	Lisa Stansfield; Ian Devaney; Andy Morris		4:06
7.	"Rescue Me" (Fontella Bass cover)	Raynard Miner; Carl William Smith		3:09
8.	"Boogie Nights" (Heatwave cover)	Rod Temperton	Mark Taylor; Tracy Ackerman	3:41
9.	"Not What I Call Love"	Andy Parker; Sonia Evans	Mark Cyrus	4:08
10.	"My Light"	Taylor; Ackerman; Evans	Taylor; Ackerman	3:56
11.	"Next to You"	Parker; Evans	Cyrus	4:10
12.	"From Me to You"	Parker; Evans	Cyrus	3:34
13.	"Just One Look"	Ian Levine; Pamela Sheynen	Levine	3:31
Total length:				42:39

== Personnel ==
- Phil Harding / Ian Curnow - Mixers of track 8
- Pete Hammond - Mixer of track 13
- Robin Sellars - Engineer on tracks 1, 2, 3, 4, 5, 6, 7
