= Be Young, Be Foolish, Be Happy =

1967 soul song

Single by the Tams

from the album A Little More Soul
- B-side: "That Same Old Song"
- Released: 1968
- Recorded: 1968
- Genre: R&B
- Length: 2:06
- Label: ABC
- Songwriters: Ray Whitley, J.R. Cobb
- Producer: Joe South

The Tams singles chronology
"All My Hard Times" (1967)	"Be Young, Be Foolish, Be Happy" (1968)	"Trouble Maker" (1968)

"Be Young, Be Foolish, Be Happy" is a soul song. It was first recorded in 1967 by the Sensational Epics and was originally released on Warner Bros. Records. The song has also been recorded by the Tams, Sonia, and others.

== The Tams version ==
The Tams' version was released as a single in 1968, in the US, and was a moderate success, peaking at No. 26 on the R&B singles chart and No. 61 on the Hot 100. Sometime later, in March 1970, it peaked at No. 32 on the UK Singles Chart. It has since become one of the most popular beach music songs, especially in the American South, where the song and the group enjoy continued popularity and recognizability, as do all of the hits by the group. The song is also still popular in the United Kingdom among fans of Northern soul. Noddy Holder, lead singer with '70s British Glam rock band Slade, claimed in a newspaper interview that his band was playing the song live long before its Northern Soul success.

=== Charts ===
Chart (1968)	Peak position
US Billboard Hot 100	61
US Best Selling Rhythm & Blues Singles (Billboard)	26

Chart (1970)	Peak position
UK Singles (OCC)	32

== Sonia version ==
"Be Young, Be Foolish, Be Happy"

Single by Sonia

from the album Sonia
- B-side: "Used to Be My Love"
- Released: August 19, 1991
- Length: 2:56
- Label: IQ
- Songwriters: Ray Robert Whitley, J.R. Cobb
- Producer: Nigel Wright

Sonia singles chronology
"Only Fools (Never Fall in Love)" (1991)	"Be Young, Be Foolish, Be Happy" (1991)	"You to Me Are Everything" (1991)

Sonia's version of the song was produced by Nigel Wright for her second, self-titled studio album. The song was released in August 1991 as the album's second single, with another album track "Used to Be My Love" on the B-side. The song reached No. 22 on the UK Singles Chart. In 1992, the track was released as the lead single off the album in the US, with a different single mix than in the UK. It peaked at No. 13 on Billboard's Adult Contemporary chart.

=== Formats and track listings ===
CD single

1. "Be Young, Be Foolish, Be Happy" – 2:55
2. "Be Young, Be Foolish, Be Happy" (extended mix) – 4:54
3. "Used to Be My Love" – 3:47

7-inch single

1. "Be Young, Be Foolish, Be Happy" – 2:55
2. "Used to Be My Love" – 3:47

US 7-inch single

1. "Be Young, Be Foolish, Be Happy" (Beach mix) – 3:18
2. "Used to Be My Love" – 3:47

12-inch single

1. "Be Young, Be Foolish, Be Happy" (extended mix) – 4:54
2. "Used to Be My Love" – 3:47

=== Charts ===
Chart (1991–1992)	Peak position
Canada (Canadian Singles Chart)	98
Ireland (IRMA)	23
UK Singles (OCC)	22
UK Airplay (Music Week)	5
US Adult Contemporary Chart (Billboard)	13
