= Only Fools (Never Fall in Love) =

1991 single by Sonia

Single by Sonia

from the album Sonia
- Released: 20 May 1991
- Length: 3:44
- Label: I.Q.
- Songwriters: Tony Hiller; Barry Upton
- Producer: Nigel Wright

Sonia singles chronology
"End of the World" (1990)	"Only Fools (Never Fall in Love)" (1991)	"Be Young, Be Foolish, Be Happy" (1991)

"Only Fools (Never Fall in Love)" is a song by British singer Sonia. It was produced by Nigel Wright for Sonia's second studio album, Sonia (1991). The song was written by Tony Hiller, who had success in the 1970s as manager for Brotherhood of Man, and one-time member Barry Upton. The song was released in May 1991 by I.Q. Records as the album's first single and became a top-10 hit in the United Kingdom and Ireland.

== Background and writing ==
Co-writer Barry Upton commented that he had initially written the song with Diana Ross in mind, but Sonia's A&R man, Simon Cowell heard the song and took it for her. After the single's success, Upton was keen to work with her directly, but Cowell prevented this.

== Critical reception ==
James Hamilton from Record Mirror wrote, "Produced by Nigel Wright now, the irrepressible redhead returns on a different label with a 'You Can't Hurry Love'-like 0-192.8bpm frothy bouncer reminiscent of 'Save All Your Kisses for Me' (instrumental flip), a useful addition at that popular tempo for mobile jocks." Mark Frith from Smash Hits described "Only Fools (Never Fall in Love)" as "a hand-clapping, trombone-touting song about love, boys and heartbreak that should have been made in 1963. Sonia would be The Supremes if she could find two other people like her".

== Chart performance ==
In the United Kingdom, "Only Fools (Never Fall in Love)" debuted at number 28 on the UK Singles Chart on 1 June 1991, climbed to number ten in its fourth week, and fell off the top 100 after eight weeks. It also reached a peak of number six in Ireland, number 29 in Finland and number 51 in Germany. On the Eurochart Hot 100, it started at number 64 on the chart edition of 15 June 1991, peaked at number 31 two weeks later and charted for a total of five weeks.

== Track listings ==
- 7-inch and cassette single
1. "Only Fools (Never Fall in Love)"
2. "Only Fools (Never Fall in Love)" (instrumental)
- 12-inch single

A. "Only Fools (Never Fall in Love)" (extended club mix)
B. "Only Fools (Never Fall in Love)" (instrumental)

- CD single
1. "Only Fools (Never Fall in Love)" (7-inch version)
2. "Only Fools (Never Fall in Love)" (extended club mix)
3. "Only Fools (Never Fall in Love)" (instrumental)

== Charts ==
Weekly chart performance for "Only Fools (Never Fall in Love)"
Chart (1991)	Peak position
Europe (Eurochart Hot 100)	31
Europe (European Airplay Top 50)	23
Europe (European Hit Radio)	20
Finland (Suomen virallinen lista)	29
Germany (GfK)	51
Germany Airplay (Music & Media)	18
Ireland (IRMA)	6
Luxembourg (Radio Luxembourg)	14
Sweden Airplay (Music & Media)	18
UK Singles (Official Charts)	10
UK Airplay (Music Week)	2
