= Handful of Promises =

Single by Big Fun

from the album A Pocketful of Dreams
- B-side: "Catch a Broken Heart"
- Released: 5 March 1990
- Recorded: 1989
- Studio: PWL
- Venue: The Borough, London
- Genre: Dance-pop
- Length: 3:16
- Label: Jive
- Songwriters: Mike Stock; Matt Aitken; Pete Waterman
- Producer: Stock Aitken Waterman

Big Fun singles chronology
"Can't Shake the Feeling" (1989)	"Handful of Promises" (1990)	"You've Got a Friend" (1990)

"Handful of Promises" is a pop-dance song written by Stock Aitken Waterman for British boy band Big Fun. It was the third single from their 1990 debut studio album A Pocketful of Dreams on which it is the first track. The B-side of the various formats is a new song, "Catch a Broken Heart", which was not included on the parent album. Released on 5 March 1990 with two different covers, it failed to reach the top 20 in United Kingdom where it stalled at number 21. However, it was a top ten hit in Ireland and Spain.

== Background and release ==
The harder dance sound of the record was decided upon following the success of the producers' recent hit with Lonnie Gordon, "Happenin' All Over Again". "Handful of Promises" charted moderately, and this relative commercial underperformance of the song in the UK disappointed its producers, with Pete Waterman saying the song "stiffed", and conceding, "we obviously got something wrong".

== Critical reception ==
James Hamilton of Record Mirror described the song like this: "Dated hip house clichés started but then whinneyingly harmonised lush mushy canterer, far from their best". In 2017, Christian Guiltenane of British magazine Attitude stated that the song was "a great tune, complete with that super cool 'Woh! Yeah!' sample… an absolute corker, but the high pitch of their vocals deem the song barely listenable, which is a shame".

== Chart performance ==
"Handful of Promises" entered the UK Singles Chart at number 29 on 17 March 1990, climbed the following week to reach a peak of number 21, and charted for a total of six weeks, becoming Big Fun's first single to stall outside the top ten. In Ireland, it ranked for three weeks from 15 March 1990, with a peak at number six, which remains Big Fun's highest placement in the country. It also attained number nine in Spain and number 14 in Finland, achieved a moderate success in Belgium (Flanders) where it was a top 50 hit, and missed the top 100 in Australia where it peaked at number 110. On the Pan-European Hot 100 Singles chart compiled by Music & Media, it started at number 71 on 24 March 1990, peaked of number 53 in its second and third weeks and fell off the top 100 after four weeks.

== Formats and track listings ==
- 7" single, Cassette
1. "Handful of Promises" – 3:16
2. "Catch a Broken Heart" – 3:39
- CD maxi
1. "Handful of Promises" (7" version) – 3:17
2. "Handful of Promises" (12" version) – 6:38
3. "Catch a Broken Heart" – 3:48
4. "Can't Shake the Feeling" – 3:39
- 12" single
1. "Handful of Promises" (12" version) – 6:38
2. "Handful of Promises" (instrumental) – 3:48
3. "Catch a Broken Heart" – 3:39

== Credits and personnel ==
The following people contributed to "Handful of Promises":

- Karen Hewitt – engineer
- Phil Harding – mixing

== Charts ==
Chart (1990)	Peak position
Australia (ARIA Charts)	110
Belgium (Ultratop 50 Flanders)	42
Europe (Eurochart Hot 100)	53
Finland (Suomen virallinen lista)	14
France Airplay (SNEP)	95
Ireland (IRMA)	6
Luxembourg (Radio Luxembourg)	20
Spain (PROMUSICAE)	9
Spain Airplay (Top 40 Radio)	3
UK Singles (OCC)	21
