= You've Got a Friend (Sonia and Big Fun song) =

1990 single by Big Fun and Sonia

Single by Big Fun and Sonia featuring Gary Barnacle
- Released: 11 June 1990
- Length: 3:33
- Label: Chrysalis
- Songwriter: Stock, Aitken & Waterman
- Producer: Stock, Aitken & Waterman

Sonia singles chronology
"Counting Every Minute" (1990)	"You've Got a Friend" (1990)	"End Of the World" (1990)

Big Fun singles chronology
"Handful of Promises" (1990)	"You've Got a Friend" (1990)	"Hey There Lonely Girl" (1990)

"You've Got a Friend" is a song written and produced by Stock Aitken Waterman and performed by Sonia and Big Fun, and featuring Gary Barnacle on saxophone. The song was released as a charity single for the Childline foundation on June 11, 1990. Initially the artists recorded the well-known Carole King song "You've Got a Friend", but it was ultimately not used, and Stock, Aitken & Waterman wrote an original song with the same name instead. The cover version was finally released in the 2010 re-issue of Big Fun's album, A Pocketful of Dreams. The single peaked at number 14 in the UK and number 12 in Ireland. It was later included on Big Fun's Japanese edition of their debut album A Pocketful of Dreams.

== Track listings ==
CD single

1. "You've Got a Friend" – 3:33
2. "You've Got a Friend" (extended mix) – 6:30
3. "You've Got a Friend" (extended instrumental) – 6:30

7-inch single

1. "You've Got a Friend" – 3:33
2. "You've Got a Friend" (instrumental) – 3:33

12-inch single

1. "You've Got a Friend" (extended mix) – 6:30
2. "You've Got a Friend" (extended instrumental) – 6:30

== Charts ==
=== Weekly charts ===
Weekly chart performance for "You’ve Got a Friend"
Chart (1990)	Peak position
Australia (ARIA)	157
Europe (Eurochart Hot 100)	37
France Airplay (SNEP)	40
Ireland (IRMA)	12
Israel (IBA)	4
Luxembourg (Radio Luxembourg)	11
UK Singles (Official Charts)	14
UK Airplay (Music & Media)	2

=== Year-end charts ===
Year-end chart performance for "You’ve Got a Friend"
Chart (1990)	Position
Israel (IBA)	61
