= Damian (musician) =

Background information
- Born: Damian Gerard Baker; 30 September 1964; Manchester, England
- Died: 12 February 2017 (aged 52) Tameside, England
- Genres: Pop
- Occupation: Singer
- Years active: 1987-2017

Damian Davey (born Damian Gerard Baker; 30 September 1964 – 12 February 2017), better known by the mononym Damian, was an English pop musician, best known for his 1989 remix cover version of "The Time Warp" from The Rocky Horror Show. The track reached number 7 in the UK singles chart.

== Career ==
Damian was briefly successful in the late 1980s. His first version of "The Time Warp", released in 1987, was produced by Des Tong from Sad Café and featured Sheila Gott, Jean Barrow, Ian Wilson and Steve Butler on backing vocals. It was recorded at Vector TV in Stockport and mixed at Battery Studios, London by Paul Schroeder.

Both this and a 1988 reissue of the song failed to make the Top 40 of the UK singles chart, and it only became a major hit after being remixed and restructured by Pete Hammond, reaching number 7 in the same chart in 1989.

Damian's follow up single, "Wig-Wam Bam", a cover of The Sweet song, reached number 49 in the UK singles chart.

== Death ==
Damian died on 12 February 2017, aged 52, following a three-year battle against cancer.

== Discography ==
=== Singles ===
| Year | Single | Peak positions | | |
| Year | Single | IE | UK | SA |
|---|---|---|---|---|
| 1987 | "The Time Warp" | — | 51 | — |
| 1988 | "The Time Warp" (reissue) | — | 64 | 9 |
| 1989 | "The Time Warp II" (remix) | 8 | 7 | — |
| 1989 | "Wig-Wam Bam" | — | 49 | — |
| 2007 | "Video Killed the Radio Star" | — | — | — |
"—" denotes releases that did not chart
