= Blame It on the Boogie =

1978 single by Mick Jackson

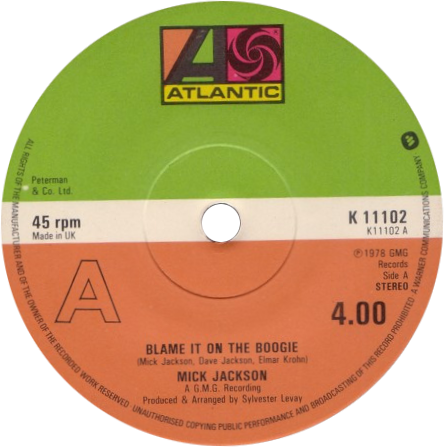
- UK single of the Mick Jackson recording

Single by Mick Jackson

from the album Weekend
- B-side: "All Night Boppin'"
- Released: 1978
- Recorded: 1978
- Genre: Disco
- Length: 4:00
- Label: Atlantic
- Songwriters: Mick Jackson; Dave Jackson; Elmar Krohn
- Producer: Sylvester Levay

Mick Jackson singles chronology
"Blame It on the Boogie" (1978)	"Weekend" (1979)

"Blame It on the Boogie"
- Continental European single of the Jacksons recording

Single by the Jacksons

from the album Destiny
- B-side: "Do What You Wanna"
- Released: 8 September 1978 (UK)
- Recorded: 1978
- Genre: Disco
- Length: 3:36; 7:00 (12-inch version)
- Label: Epic; CBS
- Songwriters: Mick Jackson; Dave Jackson; Elmar Krohn
- Producer: The Jacksons

The Jacksons singles chronology
"Goin' Places" (1977)	"Blame It on the Boogie" (1978)	"Shake Your Body (Down to the Ground)" (1979)

Alternative release(s)
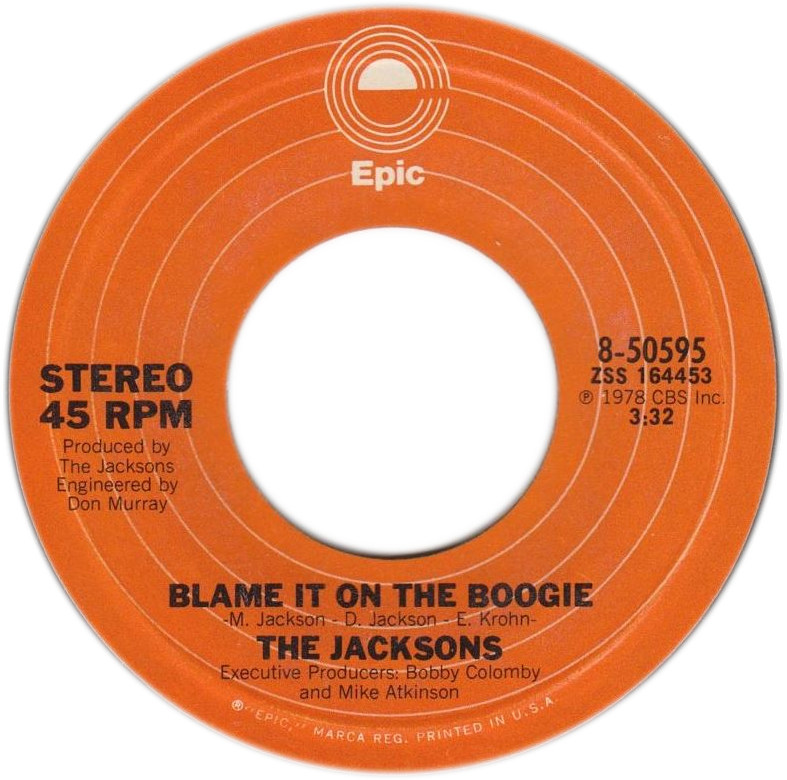
- US single of the Jacksons recording

Music video
- "Blame It on the Boogie" on YouTube

"Blame It on the Boogie" is a song written by English singer-songwriter Mick Jackson, Dave Jackson, and Elmar Krohn. While the song was recorded by Mick Jackson, the best-known version was recorded by the American group the Jacksons, (no relation) and is the first single from their thirteenth album Destiny. It has also been covered by Clock, Big Fun, and Luis Miguel.

== Background ==
The song was co-authored by Mick Jackson (credited as Michael George Jackson-Clarke) as well as Mick's brother David Jackson and Elmar Krohn.

Although Mick Jackson recorded the song in 1978, "Blame It on the Boogie" was written in hopes of being sold to Stevie Wonder.

Mick Jackson's track was showcased in 1978 at Midem where, according to Mick Jackson, "The Jacksons' manager [Peter Kerstin] heard the track being played... and took a tape recording of it... back to the States [where] the Jacksons quickly recorded a version so it would be out before mine." The Mick Jackson recording was released by Atlantic Records in the US in August 1978 where it reached number 61, rising to 15 in the UK.

According to Michael Jackson of the Jacksons, Bobby Colomby, who was producing the Jacksons' Destiny album, brought the group "Blame It on the Boogie". "It was an uptempo, finger-poppin'-time type song that was a good vehicle for the band approach we wanted to cultivate. I had fun slurring the chorus: [the lyric] 'Blame It on the Boogie' could be sung in one breath without putting my lips together."

Record World praised Michael Jackson's "silky vocals and energetic youthful delivery."

== Personnel ==
=== The Jacksons version ===
- Michael Jackson – lead vocals and backing vocals
- Jackie Jackson, Marlon Jackson, Randy Jackson, Tito Jackson – backing vocals
- John Luongo – mixing
- Don Murray – engineer
- Bobby Colomby, Mike Atkinson – executive producer

==== Additional musicians ====
- Roland Bautista, Michael Sembello – rhythm guitar
- Nathan Watts – bass
- Greg Phillinganes – synthesizers and clavinet
- Rick Marotta – drums
- Laudir de Oliveira, Claudio Slon – congas and tambourine
- Jerry Hey – horn arrangements

== Chart records ==
Despite the Mick Jackson original reaching a No. 61 peak on the Billboard Hot 100 in September 1978, Epic Records that month released the Jacksons' version of "Blame It on the Boogie" as the advance single from the Destiny album. Although "Blame It on the Boogie" returned the Jacksons to the Hot 100 after five flop singles, it was not the single to effect a major comeback for the Jacksons, peaking at #54; it would be the follow-up, "Shake Your Body (Down to the Ground)", which would briefly restore the Jacksons' top ten fortunes. However, "Blame It on the Boogie" did reach No. 3 R&B and would be coupled with "Shake Your Body (Down to the Ground)" on an extended club play single which would reach No. 20 on the dance charts in 1979.

In the UK, both the Mick Jackson version and the Jacksons' were released within a few days of each other in September 1978, with the Jacksons pairing "Blame It On the Boogie" with their original song "Do What You Wanna" from their 1977 album "Goin' Places". The UK music press, struck by the rival versions being by similarly named artists, declared a "Battle of the Boogie" which Mick Jackson recalls as "great publicity...There was an equal balance of interest from the media about both releases – A good example is that my version came out first on Top of the Pops... The Jackson's [sic] had the second week... Radio One played The Jackson's [sic] version and Capital Radio only played mine – it was fair."

The Jacksons' version—incorrectly lauded by Melody Maker as their "self-penned song"—was the more successful version reaching number 8 on the chart dated 4 November 1978; the Mick Jackson version—hailed by NME as "far superior"—had peaked at number 15 on the chart for 21 October.

Mick Jackson himself in 2003 said of the Jacksons' version of "Blame It on the Boogie": "[the original] version had 100% of our heart and soul in it but the Jacksons' version had the magic extra 2% that made it incredible."

== Music video ==
A promotional music video by the Jacksons was created for "Blame It on the Boogie" in 1978. The video, featuring the group's members dancing on a black background, relied heavily on electronic trail effects, created at Image West, Ltd. using then-cutting edge equipment: the Scanimate analog computer system and a Quantel DFS 3000 digital framestore. The video also appears on the bonus disc of the DVD box set Michael Jackson's Vision.

Michael Jackson's 1993 biography states that the video marked his video debut.

== Charts ==
=== Mick Jackson version ===
==== Weekly charts ====
Chart (1978)	Peak position
Canada Top Singles (RPM)	95
UK Singles (OCC)	15
US Billboard Hot 100	61
US Cash Box Top 100	64

=== The Jacksons version ===
==== Weekly charts ====
Chart (1978–1980)	Peak position
Australia (Kent Music Report)	4
Belgium (Ultratop 50 Flanders)	7
Ireland (IRMA)	15
Netherlands (Dutch Top 40)	7
Netherlands (Single Top 100)	6
New Zealand (Recorded Music NZ)	2
Spain (PROMUSICAE)	2
UK Singles (Official Charts)	8
US Billboard Hot 100	54
US Hot Dance Club Play (Billboard)	20
US Hot R&B Singles (Billboard)	3
US Cash Box Top 100	63

Chart (2009)	Peak position
Australia (ARIA)	44
Netherlands (Single Top 100)	72
UK Singles (OCC)	55

==== Year-end charts ====
Chart (1978)	Position
UK Singles (OCC)	37

Chart (1979)	Position
Belgium (Ultratop Flanders)	81
Netherlands (Dutch Top 40)	80
Netherlands (Single Top 100)	56
New Zealand (Recorded Music NZ)	7

Chart (1980)	Position
Australia (Kent Music Report)	24

== Certifications ==
=== The Jacksons version ===
Region	Certification	Certified units/sales
Denmark (IFPI Danmark)	Platinum	90,000^{‡}
Spain (Promusicae)	Gold	50,000^{‡}
United Kingdom (BPI)	Platinum	600,000^{‡}
^{‡} Sales+streaming figures based on certification alone.

== Big Fun version ==
"Blame It on the Boogie"

Single by Big Fun

from the album A Pocketful of Dreams
- Released: July 1989
- Recorded: 1989
- Genre: Dance-pop; hi-NRG
- Length: 6:27
- Label: Jive
- Songwriters: Mick Jackson; Dave Jackson and Elmar Krohn
- Producer: Stock Aitken Waterman

Big Fun singles chronology
"I Feel the Earth Move" (1989)	"Blame It on the Boogie" (1989)	"Can't Shake the Feeling" (1989)

In 1989, Stock Aitken Waterman produced a cover version of "Blame It on the Boogie" for British boy band Big Fun. Their version was released as a single the same year, and was later included in their 1990 album A Pocketful of Dreams. Initially, a cover of the 1971 song by Carole King "I Feel the Earth Move" was planned to be released as the first single, but this was cancelled as Martika had just released her own cover, so that Pete Waterman decided to produce a cover of "Blame It on the Boogie" instead. This version peaked at number four in the UK, number five in Spain and number seven in Ireland, becoming Big Fun's most successful single on the chart.

=== Critical reception ===
In a review published in Smash Hits, Dannii Minogue stated that "it's good, but it couldn't beat the Jacksons' version. A hit? Definitely, especially in the UK. But it really doesn't sound like they [Big Fun] can sing!" In 2014, Matt Dunn of WhatCulture ranked the song at number 13 in his "15 unforgettable Stock Aitken Waterman singles" list, adding that this cover "was the embodiment of [SAW] 1989 sound: approaching 120bpm, stuttered vocoder effects, some keys to capitalise on the emerging piano house craze, the driving 4/4 beat and that sampled drum loop". Regarding the music video, he stated: "With three pretty boys wearing bright primary colours and matching bumbags, some funky choreography, clever visuals and all that dodgy falsetto, it was hard not to like (or at least laugh at)". In 2019, James Masterton considered that "to pop fans of 1989 the song was fresh and exciting", and although he deemed Big Fun not great singers, he attributed the song's success to their "gleaming smiles, perfect hair and perhaps more importantly a dance routine that was easy to copy".

=== Chart performance ===
In the United Kingdom, "Blame It on the Boogie" entered the singles chart at number 25 on the week ending on 12 August 1989, climbed to the top ten the next week, peaked at number four in its fifth week, and spent a total of 11 weeks on the chart, five of them in the top 10. It peaked inside the top 10 in three other nations: Luxembourg and Spain, where it was a top-five hit, and Ireland, where it reached number seven and remained on the chart for three weeks. In Belgium (Flanders), Germany and France, it peaked in the top 20, with almost 20 weeks on the charts in the two last territories. In addition, it was a top-40 hit in the Netherlands, Australia and New Zealand.

=== Track listings ===
- 7" single
1. "Blame It on the Boogie" – 3:35
2. "Blame It on the Boogie" (instrumental) – 3:37
- 12" maxi
1. "Blame It on the Boogie" (PWL mix) – 6:30
2. "Blame It on the Boogie" (Dub mix) – 4:00
3. "Blame It on the Boogie" (instrumental) – 3:37

=== Charts ===
==== Weekly charts ====
Weekly chart performance for "Blame It on the Boogie" (by Big Fun)
Chart (1989–1990)	Peak position
Australia (ARIA)	37
Belgium (Ultratop 50 Flanders)	14
Europe (Eurochart Hot 100)	16
Europe (European Hit Radio)	14
France (SNEP)	17
France Airplay (SNEP)	7
Ireland (IRMA)	7
Israel (IBA)	7
Italy Airplay (Music & Media)	7
Luxembourg (Radio Luxembourg)	3
Netherlands (Dutch Top 40)	28
Netherlands (Single Top 100)	31
New Zealand (Recorded Music NZ)	32
Spain (AFYVE)	5
Spain Airplay (Top 40 Radio)	4
UK Singles (Official Charts)	4
UK Airplay (Music & Media)	15
UK Dance (Music Week)	8
West Germany (GfK)	15

==== Year-end charts ====
Year-end chart performance for "Blame It on the Boogie" (by Big Fun)
Chart (1989)	Position
Belgium (Ultratop 50 Flanders)	87
Europe (European Hot 100 Singles)	96
UK Singles (OCC)	51

== Other notable versions ==
- Tina Charles has stated that she recorded "Blame It on the Boogie" prior to the Jacksons; her version was not released as "Sony [felt] it was not a strong enough song."
- 1990: Luis Miguel covered the song in Spanish as "Será que no me amas" ("Might It Be That You Don't Love Me?") on the album 20 Años. The song was also featured in Luis Miguel: The Series, a biopic series about the singer’s life. Luisito Rey, Miguel’s father and first manager, due to his low influence in English speaking producing circles, could not help his son get a collaboration with Michael Jackson. Despite that he did manage to arrange the rights from Peter Kerstin, in order to make his cover-homage interpretation. The lyrics were adapted in Spanish by Juan Carlos Calderón. The song was released as the third single from the album and it received significant radio airplay in Mexico, peaking at number 14. A live version of the song was featured on El Concierto (1995).
- 1998: British dance act Clock's version of "Blame It on the Boogie" reached number 16 in the UK.
- 2011: Jermaine Jackson—who had left the group three years before his brothers, the Jacksons, recorded the song—recorded his own solo version.

== Documentary ==
In 2010, filmmaker Patrick Nation made a Channel 4 documentary about Mick Jackson and the story of the song, titled The Other Michael Jackson: Battle of the Boogie. The documentary was co-written and presented by Mick's son Sam Peter Jackson and led to Mick Jackson's 1978 album Weekend (which features the original version of "Blame It on the Boogie") being re-released (for download on the iTunes Store) for the first time in 30 years by Demon Music. To promote the documentary, Mick gave a rare television interview to BBC Breakfast.
