= You'll Never Stop Me Loving You =

1989 single by Sonia

Single by Sonia

from the album Everybody Knows
- Released: 12 June 1989
- Studio: PWL 1 and 4 (London, England)
- Genre: Dance-pop
- Length: 3:22
- Label: Chrysalis; PWL
- Songwriter: Stock Aitken Waterman
- Producer: Stock Aitken Waterman

Sonia singles chronology
"You'll Never Stop Me Loving You" (1989)	"Can't Forget You" (1989)

Music video
- "You'll Never Stop Me Loving You" on YouTube

"You'll Never Stop Me Loving You" is a song by English singer Sonia, released as her debut single in June 1989. Written and produced by Stock Aitken Waterman, the song was included on Sonia's debut album, Everybody Knows (1990). The single became Sonia's only number-one single on the UK Singles Chart and reached number 10 on the US Billboard Dance Club Play chart.

== Background and release ==
In a 1990 interview, Sonia told about how she met the producer, "The whole thing is quite like a dream to me. Pete [Waterman, of Stock Aitken Waterman] was doing this radio road show in Liverpool, and I thought to myself, 'Oh this is a chance I can't miss!' So I went along to try and sing to him." Gaining Waterman's attention was not easy, but once she did, the producer added her to PWL's Coca-Cola Hitman Roadshow, a tour of England featuring the label's up-and-coming artists. Contrary to music industry myth, the song was not written to fit Sonia's personality, with Mike Stock stating that the track was actually refined from pre-existing ideas that were likely originally intended for Kylie Minogue's Enjoy Yourself album.

In the United Kingdom, PWL and Chrysalis Records released the song on 12 June 1989 as a 7-inch and 12-inch vinyl single. Three weeks later, on 3 July, a cassette single was issued. In Japan, a mini-CD single was released on 30 August 1989. After its release, the track developed a tongue-in-cheek reputation as a "stalker anthem", due to its lyrical themes of unrequited romantic obsession and a refusal to take no for answer; however, composer Mike Stock says that while the lyrics sparked some alarm from female backing vocalists during composition and recording, he feels that Sonia's innocent teenage delivery defuses any sinister interpretation. Directed by Pete Cornish, the music video shows Sonia dancing and trying to flirt with a male dancer in a studio.

== Critical reception ==
=== Initial response ===
Bill Coleman from Billboard wrote, "Successful European track will entice American jocks hankering for bubbly pop/NRG with "French Kiss" twist. Already showing early signs of widespread radio crossover." Pan-European magazine Music & Media found that "the SAW backing sounds like most of the other work they have done but at least Sonia has a good voice." Richard Lowe from Smash Hits felt the single "was probably the best all year." David Giles of Music Week described the song as being "ghastly" and deemed "Listen to Your Heart" "a hundred times better".

=== Retrospective reviews ===
In a 2019 critical review, James Masterton attributed the single's success to SAW's popularity at the time, stating: "Not even the most ardent fan of the producers' work would admit that the single was at effort, devoid of much in the way of melody or choral appeal and a song into which even the overwhelming enthusiasm of the still relentlessly cherry Sonia could not breathe any life". In 2020, Gary James of Entertainment Focus described the song as a "classic SAW" which was "very much of it's [sic] time", praised "Sonia's soulful pop powerhouse vocal which really gets going as we hit the chorus" and presented "Sonia's instant likability" as one of the factors that contributed to the song's success.

=== Impact and legacy ===
In 2014, Matt Dunn of WhatCulture ranked the song at number 8 in his "15 unforgettable Stock Aitken Waterman singles" list, adding that it "had just the right mix of 'SAW sound', cheesy lyrics, a stomping beat and a cute video to capture the public's imagination". In 2021, British magazine Classic Pop ranked "You'll Never Stop Me Loving You" number 27 on their list of the "Top 40 Stock Aitken Waterman songs", adding: "18-year-old Sonia Evans was a complete unknown when she approached Pete Waterman for a break in the biz, and luckily SAW, er, saw potential in the effervescent, ginger-haired scouser. Despite slightly stalkerish lyrics... it rocketed up the charts. Some thought it was Kylie, which might have helped its rise to the top of the UK hit parade." In 2025, Thomas Edward of Smooth Radio ranked the song 13th in his list of "Stock Aitken Waterman's 15 greatest songs, ranked", deeming it "the perfect mix of cutesy image, cheesy lyrics and upbeat pop beats".

== Chart performance ==
"You'll Never Stop Me Loving You" debuted on the UK Singles Chart at number 55 on 24 June 1989, peaking at number one four weeks later for two weeks, becoming Sonia's only number-one single there, and stayed on the chart for 13 weeks, which led the song to rank at number 16 on the national year-end chart. In Ireland, the song also topped the chart on which it remained for a total of eight weeks, and peaked within the top ten in other two European nations, Greece and Norway, where it attained number three and ten, respectively. It was a top 20 hit in Spain (13), Finland (14) and the Flanders region of Belgium (18), while it culminated at number 20 in its third week out of a 12-week chart run on the German singles chart. In addition it missed the top 20 by one place in Switzerland, and peaked within the top 30 in the Netherlands and France. On the Pan-Eurochart Hot 100 singles chart compiled by the Music & Media magazine, it debuted at number 41 on 15 July 1989, jumped to number eight the next week, reached number one in its fourth week, and remained on the chart for a total of 20 weeks divided into two segments. Much aired on UK radios where it reached number one on the airplay chart, it was present for six weeks on the European Airplay Top 50, with a peak at number 34 in its third week.

"You'll Never Stop Me Loving You" was a moderate hit in Oceanian markets: in Australia, it entered the ARIA Singles Chart at number 160 in August 1989, reached a peak of number 29 two months later and charted for 17 weeks, while it reached number 43 in New Zealand. In the US, "You'll Never Stop Me Loving You" peaked at number 10 on the Billboard Dance Club Play chart in April 1990, and peaked at number 26 on the Billboard 12-inch Singles Sales chart the same month.

== Track listings ==
- 7-inch, 12-inch, and cassette single
1. "You'll Never Stop Me Loving You"
2. "You'll Never Stop Me Loving You" (instrumental)
- UK 12-inch remix single

A. "You'll Never Stop Me Loving You" (Sonia's Kiss mix)
B. "You'll Never Stop Me Loving You"

- US cassette single

A. "You'll Never Stop Me Loving You" (7-inch version) – 3:22
B. "You'll Never Stop Me Loving You" (Kissing mix) – 6:40

- Japanese mini-CD single
1. "You'll Never Stop Me Loving You"
2. "You'll Never Stop Me Loving You" (extended version)
3. "You'll Never Stop Me Loving You" (instrumental)

== Credits and personnel ==
Credits are taken from the UK 7-inch single liner notes.

Studio

- Recorded at PWL Recording Studios 1 and 4 (London, England)

Personnel

- Stock Aitken Waterman – writing, production, arrangement
  - Mike Stock – backing vocals, keyboards
  - Matt Aitken – guitars, keyboards
- Sonia – lead vocals
- Suzanne Rhatigan – backing vocals
- Linda Taylor – backing vocals
- Ian Curnow – additional keyboards
- A Linn – drums
- Mixmaster Pete Hammond – mixing
- Karen Hewitt – engineering
- Yoyo – engineering
- Simon Fowler – photography

== Charts ==
=== Weekly charts ===
Weekly chart performance for "You'll Never Stop Me Loving You"
Chart (1989–1990)	Peak position
Australia (ARIA)	29
Belgium (Ultratop 50 Flanders)	18
Europe (Eurochart Hot 100)	1
Europe (European Airplay Top 50)	34
Finland (Suomen virallinen lista)	14
France (SNEP)	29
Greece (IFPI)	3
Ireland (IRMA)	1
Luxembourg (Radio Luxembourg)	1
Netherlands (Dutch Top 40)	25
Netherlands (Single Top 100)	26
New Zealand (Recorded Music NZ)	43
Norway (VG-lista)	10
Spain (AFYVE)	13
Switzerland (Schweizer Hitparade)	21
UK Singles (Official Charts)	1
UK Dance (Music Week)	4
US 12-inch Singles Sales (Billboard)	26
US Dance Club Play (Billboard)	10
West Germany (GfK)	20

=== Year-end charts ===
Year-end chart performance for "You'll Never Stop Me Loving You"
Chart (1989)	Position
Europe (Eurochart Hot 100)	61
UK Singles (OCC)	16
