= Can't Shake the Feeling =

Single by Big Fun

from the album A Pocketful of Dreams
- Released: 13 November 1989
- Recorded: 1989
- Studio: PWL
- Venue: The Borough, London
- Genre: Dance-pop
- Length: 3:57
- Label: Jive
- Songwriters: Mike Stock; Matt Aitken; Pete Waterman
- Producer: Stock Aitken Waterman

Big Fun singles chronology
"Blame It on the Boogie" (1989)	"Can't Shake the Feeling" (1989)	"Handful of Promises" (1990)

"Can't Shake the Feeling" is a pop-dance song written by Stock Aitken Waterman for British boy band Big Fun. It was the second single from their 1990 debut studio album A Pocketful of Dreams on which it is the third track. Released in November 1989 with two different covers, it enjoyed decent chart trajectories in European countries, although it was unable to meet the same success than Big Fun's previous hit "Blame It on the Boogie". It became a top ten hit in the United Kingdom, Ireland, Spain and Finland, and a top 50 hit in Belgium, France and Germany.

== Background and writing ==
The finished version of "Can't Shake the Feeling" was built around an acid house piano riff originated by Matt Aitken relatively late in the composition process, after the production team initially struggled to make earlier runs work.

== Critical reception ==
A review in Pan-European magazine Music & Media considered "Can't Shake the Feeling" "one of SAW's better releases", adding it was "a punchy dance number with a lot of spirit that recalls stablemate Kylie Minogue's "I Should Be So Lucky". In his 2017 book Europe's Stars of '80s Dance Pop: 32 International Music Legends Discuss Their Careers, James Arena described the song and "Blame It on the Boogie" as "breezy, infectiously catchy and high-energy dance-pop singles". In 2019, James Masterton deemed "Can't Shake the Feeling" as a song which "admittedly wasn't one of their most exceptional efforts" and attributed its success, although not phenomenal, to SAW's popularity at that time.

== Chart performance ==
"Can't Shake the Feeling" entered the UK Singles Chart at number 27 on 25 November 1989, climbed the following two weeks until reaching a peak of number eight, and charted for a total of nine weeks. In Ireland, it ranked from 30 November 1989 and for three weeks, with a peak at number seven. It was also a top ten hit in Finland and was a hit in Spain where it was much aired on radio, which allowed it to top the airplay chart. However, it achieved a moderate success in other European countries, becoming only a top 40 hit in Belgium (Flanders), and a top 50 hit in France and Germany. Similarly, it just entered the top 100 in Australia, stalling at number 97. On the Eurochart Hot 100, it started at number 86 on 2 December 1989, climbed to a peak of number 32 in its fifth week and fell off the top 100 after eight weeks of presence. On the European Airplay Top 50, it peaked at number 36 and remained on the chart for three weeks.

== Formats and track listings ==
- 7" single, Cassette
1. "Can't Shake the Feeling" – 3:57
2. "Don't Say It's Over" – 3:51
- CD maxi
1. "Can't Shake the Feeling" (12" version) – 6:07
2. "Don't Say It's Over" – 3:51
3. "Can't Shake the Feeling" (instrumental) – 3:51
4. "I Feel the Earth Move" (7" version) - 3:29
- 12" single
1. "Can't Shake the Feeling" (12" version) – 6:07
2. "Don't Say It's Over" – 3:51
3. "Can't Shake the Feeling" (instrumental) – 3:51
- 12" single
1. "Can't Shake the Feeling" (remix) – 5:50
2. "Don't Say It's Over" – 3:51
3. "I Feel the Earth Move" (7" version) - 3:29

== Credits and personnel ==
The following people contributed to "Can't Shake the Feeling":

- Karen Hewitt, Yoyo - Engineer
- Dave Ford - Mixing

== Charts ==
Weekly chart performance for "Can't Shake the Feeling"
Chart (1989–90)	Peak position
Australia (ARIA Charts)	97
Austria Airplay (Airplay Top 20)	20
Belgium (Ultratop 50 Flanders)	38
Europe (Eurochart Hot 100)	32
Europe (European Hit Radio)	36
Finland (Suomen virallinen lista)	9
France (SNEP)	47
France Airplay (SNEP)	21
Germany (GfK)	41
Ireland (IRMA)	7
Israel (IBA)	10
Luxembourg (Radio Luxembourg)	6
Spain (PROMUSICAE)	6
Spain Airplay (Top 40 Radio)	1
UK Singles (OCC)	8
UK Airplay (Music & Media)	16
UK Dance (Music Week)	25
