= Sonia (singer) =

British singer (born 1971)

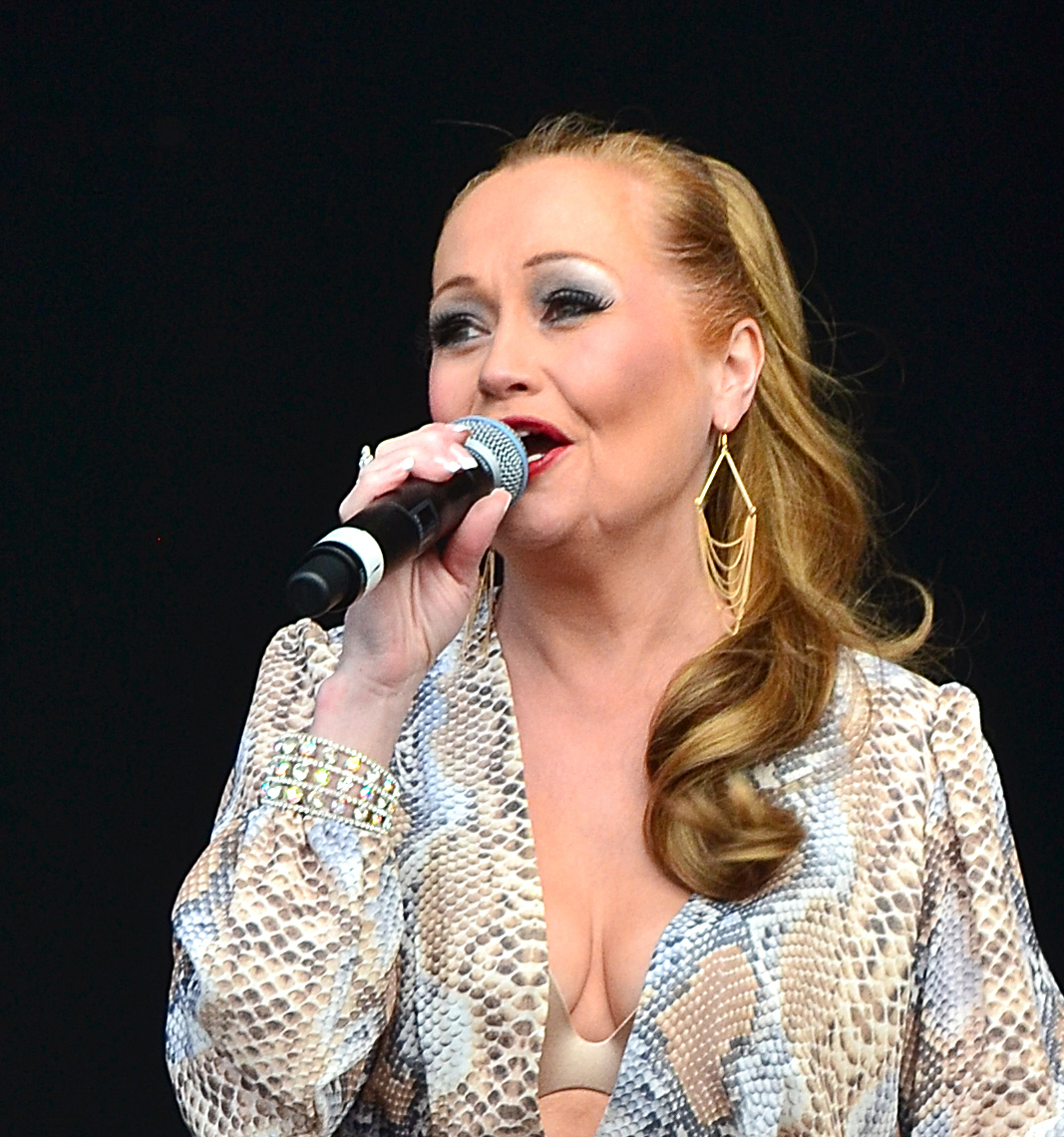
- Sonia performing in 2014

Background information
- Born: Sonia Evans; 13 February 1971 (age 55); Liverpool, Merseyside, England
- Genres: Pop
- Occupations: Singer; actress
- Instrument: Vocals
- Years active: 1989–present
- Labels: Chrysalis; Arista

Sonia Evans (born 13 February 1971), known mononymously as Sonia, is an English singer. She had a 1989 UK number one hit with "You'll Never Stop Me Loving You" and became the first female UK artist to achieve five top 20 hit singles from one album.. She represented the United Kingdom in the Eurovision Song Contest 1993, where she finished second with the song "Better the Devil You Know".

Between 1989 and 1993, she had 11 UK top 30 hits, including "Listen to Your Heart" (1989), "Counting Every Minute" (1990) and "Only Fools (Never Fall in Love)" (1991). In 1994, she starred as Sandy in a West End revival of the musical Grease, while on television she appeared as Bunty in the 1998 BBC comedy series The Lily Savage Show.

== Career ==
=== Music breakthrough ===
Sonia was signed to Chrysalis Records after badgering Pete Waterman to listen to her sing outside his recording studio in Liverpool. Sonia's debut single, "You'll Never Stop Me Loving You", composed and produced by the songwriting and music production trio Mike Stock, Matt Aitken and Pete Waterman (Stock Aitken Waterman) was released in June 1989. "You'll Never Stop Me Loving You" peaked at number 1 on the UK Singles Chart for two weeks the following month. At 18, Sonia became one of the youngest female British singers to achieve this feat. The single also topped the Irish chart and reached the top 10 of the US dance chart.

Sonia's debut album, Everybody Knows, was released in April 1990. The album peaked at number 7 in the UK, and was certified gold by the British Phonographic Industry. All five singles released from the album became top 20 hits in the UK, making Sonia the first British solo female artist to achieve this. Sonia achieved a sixth top 20 hit in the UK in 1990 with "You've Got a Friend", recorded with the group Big Fun, and released as a charity single for Childline.

Sonia left her record label and released her second, self-titled album in 1991, produced by Nigel Wright. The first single released from it, "Only Fools (Never Fall in Love)" became Sonia's third UK top 10 hit, although the album was less successful than her debut. Sonia also contributed to two charity singles, Band Aid II's "Do They Know It's Christmas?" in 1989 (peaked at number 1 in the UK) and Gulf Aid's "As Time Stood Still" in 1991.

In 1993, Sonia represented the United Kingdom in the Eurovision Song Contest 1993, singing the Dean Collinson and Brian Teasdale composition "Better the Devil You Know". She was placed second in the contest. Her third album, also titled Better the Devil You Know was released that year and reached number 32 in the UK.

=== Theatre and acting ===
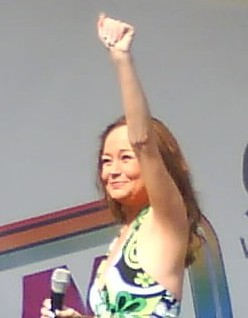
Sonia performing in 2008

Prior to her music career, around 1988, Evans appeared as an extra in Channel 4's soap opera Brookside, and also appeared in an episode of the BBC1 situation comedy Bread, where she played Ellia, a short-term girlfriend of Adrian Boswell, in episode 11 of series 4. In 1990, Sonia co-hosted children's game show The Wetter the Better as a scoreboard person with main quizmaster Ross King, which was part of the Saturday morning children's magazine show 8:15 from Manchester.

In 1993, Sonia made her theatre debut in the musical Slice of Saturday Night, alongside Dennis Waterman. The following year she replaced singer Debbie Gibson as Sandy in a West End revival of Grease, where she stayed for a year. A cover of "Hopelessly Devoted to You" was released as a tie-in single, but it only peaked at number 61 in the UK.

In 1997, she returned to the stage on the musical What A Feeling!, which also included fellow 1980s stars Luke Goss and Sinitta. An accompanying soundtrack album was released.

She has also played alongside Lily Savage as her wayward daughter Bunty Savage, both on the BBC series The Lily Savage Show and live shows.

In 2003, Sonia appeared in the ITV1 reality show Reborn in the USA, where former pop stars including Leee John from the band Imagination, Michelle Gayle, Gina G, Elkie Brooks and pop duo Dollar performed American hits. The show saw the artists touring America and each week one artist was eliminated from the show. Sonia came sixth out of the nine participants.

In January 2007, she starred in the pantomime Jack and the Beanstalk as Jack in Horsham, West Sussex, alongside Mark Curry. Sonia also starred in the pantomime Cinderella in December 2010 / January 2011 as the Wicked Queen Edwina at the Stiwt Theatre in Wrexham, North Wales, alongside Big Brother star Dale Howard.

=== Recent career ===
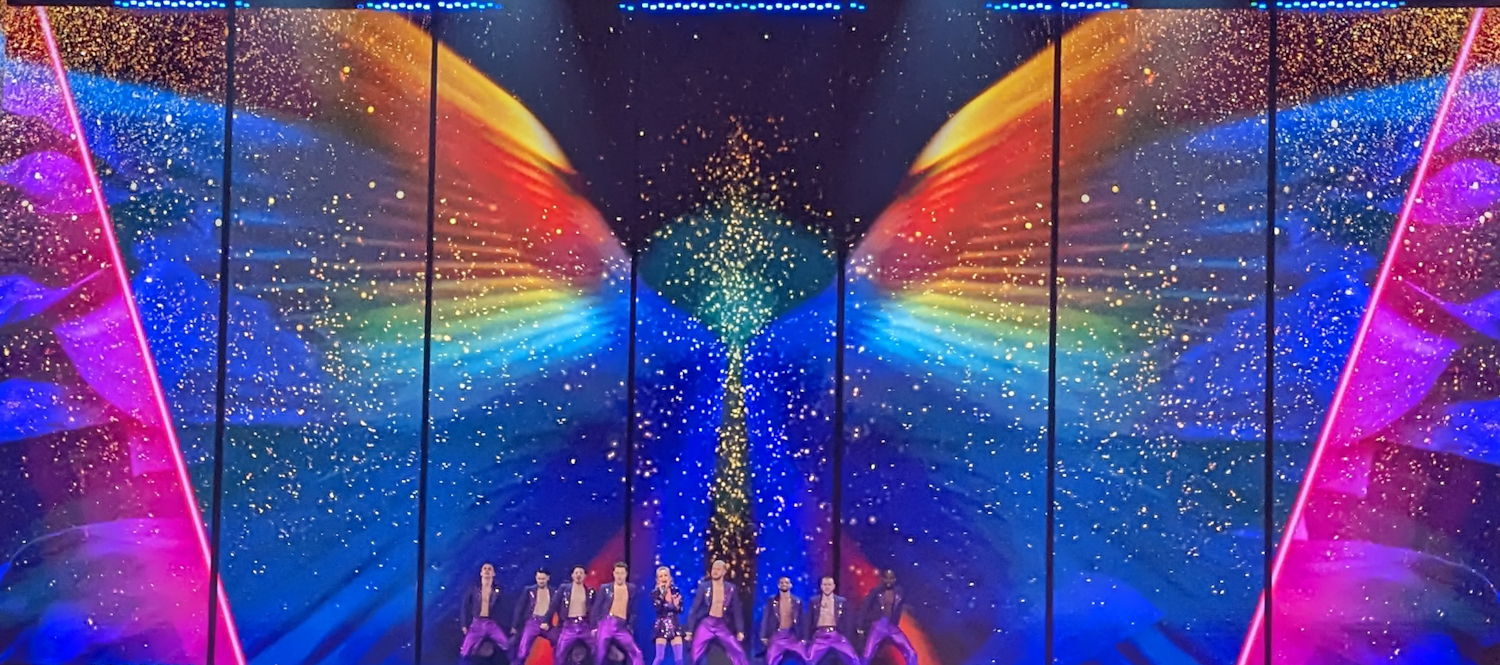
Sonia performing at the Eurovision Song Contest 2023 in Liverpool

In 2008, Sonia recorded a cover of the Beatles' "She Loves You" for the Liverpool – The Number Ones Album. On 1 June 2009, Sonia released her first single in 14 years, "Fool for Love".

On 21 December 2012, Sonia performed at the Stock Aitken Waterman "Hit Factory Live" reunion concert at The O2 in London, along with many other former SAW acts, including Kylie Minogue. In summer 2018, in conjunction with her appearance in the Channel 5 program Celebrity 5 Go Caravanning, Sonia's recording of "Dancing in the Driver's Seat", written by Barry Upton and Gordon Pogoda, was released. Another song recorded with Upton and Pogoda in 2007, "Your Heart or Mine", was released in 2018 as its follow-up. Sonia signed a new record deal with Energise Records in 2019, and a new single, "A Night That's Never Ending", was released.

She appeared on series 5 of Hacker Time. In 2018, Sonia appeared alongside Todd Carty, Tony Blackburn, Colin Baker and Sherrie Hewson in Channel 5's Celebrity 5 Go Caravanning. Sonia made a guest appearance as herself in Channel 4 soap opera, Hollyoaks, in 2023.

Sonia was a prominent advocate and supporter for Liverpool's bid to host the Eurovision Song Contest 2023. The city was announced as the winner in October 2022, beating the largest city in Scotland, Glasgow, who finished runner up. Ahead of the 2023 contest, Sonia was a prominent feature in the promotion of the contest being held in Liverpool, including a "Spot Sonia" competition held throughout the city, giving the public a chance to win tickets to the contest. During the Grand Final, Sonia performed her 1993 UK Eurovision entry "Better the Devil You Know" as the interval act.

In 2024, it was announced that Sonia was cast as a special guest in the musical theatre production Now! That's What I Call a Musical which was directed and choreographed by Craig Revel Horwood. She featured as the sole special guest star on the Scottish dates of the production at the King's Theatre in Glasgow between 18–22 February 2025. Sonia did not feature as the guest in some of the dates, instead, singer Sinitta was cast as the special guest for some performances.

== Personal life ==
Sonia married Mark Moses in 1998 and the couple have a daughter, who was born in 2010.

== Discography ==
=== Studio albums ===
List of studio albums, with selected chart positions and certifications
Title	Album details	Peak chart position		Certifications
Title	Album details	UK	AUS	Certifications
Everybody Knows	Released: 23 April 1990; Label: Chrysalis, PWL; Formats: LP, CD, cassette	7	144	BPI: Gold
Sonia	Released: 7 October 1991; Label: IQ, BMG, RCA; Formats: LP, CD, cassette	33	—	
Better the Devil You Know	Released: 17 May 1993; Label: Arista; Formats: LP, CD, cassette	32	—	
Love Train – The Philly Album	Released: 1998 (promotional copy); Re-released: 17 April 2023; Label: Carlton Sounds, Energise; Formats: LP, CD, digital download	—	—	
"—" denotes album that did not chart or was not released.

=== Compilations ===
List of compilation albums with album details
Title	Album details
Greatest Hits	Released: 6 July 2007; Label: Sony BMG; Formats: CD, digital download
The Barry Upton & Energise Collection	Released: 9 February 2022; Label: Energise; Formats: CD, digital download

=== Box sets ===
List of box sets with album details
Title	Album details
Everybody Knows – The Singles Box Set	Released: 14 May 2021; Label: Cherry Red; Formats: CD
The Vinyl Collection	Released: 11 February 2022; Label: Energise; Formats: LP

=== Singles ===
Year	Single	Peak chart positions												Album
Year	Single	UK	AUS	BEL (FLA)	FRA	GER	IRE	NED	NOR	NZ	SWI	US Dance	CAN	Album
1989	"You'll Never Stop Me Loving You"	1	29	18	29	20	1	26	10	43	21	10	—	Everybody Knows
1989	"Can't Forget You"	17	98	47	—	—	5	—	—	—	—	—	—	Everybody Knows
1989	"Listen to Your Heart"	10	119	—	39	72	22	—	—	—	—	—	—	Everybody Knows
1990	"Counting Every Minute"	16	118	—	—	—	18	—	—	—	—	—	—	Everybody Knows
1990	"You've Got a Friend" (with Big Fun)	14	157	—	—	—	12	—	—	—	—	—	—	Non-album single
1990	"End of the World"	18	153	—	—	—	18	—	—	—	—	—	—	Everybody Knows
1991	"Only Fools (Never Fall in Love)"	10	—	—	—	51	6	—	—	—	—	—	—	Sonia
1991	"Be Young, Be Foolish, Be Happy"	22	—	—	—	—	23	—	—	—	—	—	98	Sonia
1991	"You to Me Are Everything"	13	—	—	—	—	14	—	—	—	—	—	—	Sonia
1992	"Boogie Nights"	30	—	—	—	—	—	—	—	—	—	—	—	Better the Devil You Know
1993	"Better the Devil You Know"	15	—	46	—	59	26	—	—	—	—	—	—	Better the Devil You Know
1993	"We've Got the Power" (Gladiators featuring Sonia)	90	—	—	—	—	—	—	—	—	—	—	—	Non-album singles
1994	"Hopelessly Devoted to You"	61	—	—	—	—	—	—	—	—	—	—	—	Non-album singles
1995	"Wake Up Everybody"	155	—	—	—	—	—	—	—	—	—	—	—	Love Train – The Philly Album
2009	"Fool for Love"	—	—	—	—	—	—	—	—	—	—	—	—	The Collection
2018	"Dancin' in the Driver's Seat"	—	—	—	—	—	—	—	—	—	—	—	—	The Collection
2018	"Your Heart or Mine"	—	—	—	—	—	—	—	—	—	—	—	—	The Collection
2019	"A Night That's Never-Ending"	—	—	—	—	—	—	—	—	—	—	—	—	The Collection
2019	"If You Come Back to Me"	—	—	—	—	—	—	—	—	—	—	—	—	The Collection
"—" denotes releases that did not chart or were not released.

Preceded by Michael Ball with "One Step Out of Time"	UK in the Eurovision Song Contest; 1993	Succeeded by Frances Ruffelle with "Lonely Symphony (We Will Be Free)"
