= Phil Creswick =

- Born: Philip M. Creswick; 12 October 1965 (age 60); Charlwood, Surrey, England
- Genre: Pop
- Occupations: Musician, songwriter
- Label: Jive
- Formerly of: Big Fun

Philip Creswick (born 12 October 1965) is an English musician and songwriter, and a former member of the boy band, Big Fun.

== Career ==
Creswick initially was a dancer in the ensemble dance troupe Seventh Avenue. He was then a backing vocalist in the boy band, Big Fun, which was active between 1989 and 1994. The group has been described as a precursor to the more famous Take That. Their album, A Pocketful of Dreams, reached number 7 in the UK charts in 1990, while their cover of The Jacksons' "Blame It on the Boogie" reached number 4 in the singles charts.

Creswick's later songwriting credits include: Family Fantastic's album Nice (2000, in collaboration with Jason Creasey and Vince Clarke) and the soundtrack to Winning London (2001, in collaboration with Nigel Lewis and Vince Clarke). He has appeared as a guest star on British comedy TV show Never Mind the Buzzcocks, and in the live show of comedian Sarah Millican, Home Bird Live.

After Big Fun disbanded, Creswick worked as a painter and decorator, before a conviction for possession of drugs with intent to supply drugs.

== Personal life ==
In September 2017, Creswick was charged with possession and supply of illegal drugs, and also with money laundering. Creswick is gay.
