= Jason Herbert =

English singer-songwriter (1967–2019)

- Also known as: Jason John
- Born: John Joseph Herbert; 18 March 1967; Coventry, England
- Died: January 2019 (aged 51) Brazil
- Genres: Pop
- Occupations: Musician, songwriter
- Instrument: Vocals
- Years active: 1988–2019

Jason Herbert (18 March 1967 – January 2019) was an English singer-songwriter who was a member of the boy band Big Fun from 1989 to 1990. Also known as Jason John, he was the manager of former Spice Girl Geri Halliwell, at Global Talent (2003–04). He also produced songs for Lee Ryan. He later moved to Rio de Janeiro and put together the boyband P9 in Brazil. Their first album was released in July 2013.

== Life and career ==
Herbert was born on 18 March 1967, in Coventry, England. He said in an interview, he decided to quit the boyband Big Fun to run a nightclub in New York in the early 1990s.

He died in Brazil in January 2019, at the age of 51.
