= Big Fun (group) =

British band

- Origin: London, England
- Genres: Pop
- Years active: 1988–1994
- Label: Jive
- Past members: Mark Gillespie; Phil Creswick; Jason John

Big Fun were a British boy band that was active between 1988 and 1994. The band consisted of Phil Creswick, Mark Gillespie and Jason John (a.k.a. Jason Herbert). Their album was produced by Stock Aitken Waterman, though many tracks on the album were produced by other PWL members.

== Career ==
Before they became Big Fun, Creswick and John were in another regroup of Ian Levine's boy band Seventh Avenue with Mark Long. The other member of the group at that time was Steve Crawley who provided lead vocals for the group, and sang live at nightclub appearances across the UK. Other original Big Fun members include Keith Davies from Stretford in Manchester.

Their only album, A Pocketful of Dreams, was released in 1990, and reached the top 10 on the UK Albums Chart. Singles released from the album include "Blame It on the Boogie", a cover version of The Jacksons' 1978 hit, "Can't Shake the Feeling", and "Handful of Promises". "I Feel the Earth Move" was intended to be their first single (and promo copies were circulated), but its release was cancelled in favour of "Blame It on the Boogie".

The band were dropped by Jive Records in 1990, despite achieving a top 10 album and two top 10 singles over the prior 12 months. Creswick said the band never made any significant money from their hit records, claiming the band were "screwed" by the music industry, with only their record label and producers benefiting financially from their success.

Their band final single, "Stomp!", was issued on a small label in 1994, under the name 'Big Fun II', as Jason John had left the band. Although this failed to obtain the commercial success of their earlier work, it reached the dance chart in the United States.

All three members of the band were gay and had been advised by Pete Waterman to keep their sexuality quiet, as he believed it would ruin their careers. After disbanding, Creswick became a painter and decorator; he was convicted of drug supply and possession. John returned to being a model booker and music manager; he died in Brazil in 2019.

== Members ==
Personnel

- Phil Creswick (born 12 October 1965) - backing vocals
- Mark Gillespie (born 16 November 1966) - lead vocalist
- Jason John (born 18 March 1967; died January 2019) - backing vocals
- Keith Davies

== Discography ==
=== Albums ===
- 1990 – A Pocketful of Dreams – UK No. 7, GER No. 39

=== Singles ===
Year	Single	Peak positions										Album
Year	Single	UK	AUS	BEL (Fla)	FRA	GER	IRE	NED	NZ	SPN	US Dance	Album
1989	"Living for Your Love"	120	—	—	—	—	—	—	—	—	—	single only
1989	"Blame It on the Boogie"	4	37	14	17	15	7	31	32	5	—	A Pocketful of Dreams
1989	"Can't Shake the Feeling"	8	97	38	47	41	7	–	–	6	—	A Pocketful of Dreams
1990	"Handful of Promises"	21	110	42	–	–	6	–	–	9	—	A Pocketful of Dreams
1990	"You've Got a Friend" (with Sonia)	14	157	–	–	–	12	—	—	—	—	single only
1990	"Hey There Lonely Girl"	62	—	—	—	—	—	—	—	—	—	A Pocketful of Dreams
1994	"Stomp!" (as 'Big Fun II')	–	–	–	–	–	–	–	–	–	12	single only
"—" denotes releases that did not chart or were not released.

=== Video ===
- 1990 – A Pocketful of Dreams – The Video Hits
