= 1989 in British music =

This is a summary of 1989 in music in the United Kingdom, including the official charts from that year.

== Summary ==
The very beginning of the year saw compilation albums excluded from the UK Albums Chart, and spun off into the new UK Compilations Chart from the week commencing 8 January 1989. Albums such as the Now series had regularly dominated the chart since 1983, with often up to 4 of the Number 1s each year being hit compilations. Now 13 was knocked off the top spot of the albums chart as a result of this new implementation.

In the UK Singles Chart, eighteen singles reached number one. The first was a duet between teen idols Kylie Minogue and Jason Donovan, "Especially for You", which had narrowly missed out on being 1988's Christmas number one single. The two would continue their success throughout the year, with Minogue getting her third number-one single, "Hand on Your Heart", in May followed by "Wouldn't Change a Thing", which peaked at number two in August; "Never Too Late" peaked at number four in October, and then her second number-one album, Enjoy Yourself, came in November. Donovan fared even better getting two number-one singles ("Too Many Broken Hearts" in March, and "Sealed With a Kiss" in June) and one number-one album (Ten Good Reasons in May). The two enjoyed a highly publicised romance throughout the year until Minogue ended the relationship and began dating Michael Hutchence from the band INXS.

Like many artists this year, Minogue and Donovan were produced by Stock Aitken Waterman, who were at the peak of their popularity in 1989. This year saw the production team re-launch Donna Summer's career, and she scored her first Top 10 hit for 10 years with "This Time I Know It's for Real", which made number three, and followed it up with two more Top 20 hits ("I Don't Wanna Get Hurt" and "Love's About to Change My Heart") both from her album Another Place and Time, written and produced entirely by the trio. Also, the Reynolds Girls and Sonia both got the Stock Aitken Waterman treatment with their respective top 10 singles "I'd Rather Jack", which reached number eight in March, and "You'll Never Stop Me Loving You", which got to number one in July. Big Fun kick-started their short-lived pop career with a Stock Aitken Waterman produced cover of "Blame it on the Boogie", which got to number five.

After a break the previous year, Madonna returned to number one for the sixth time in March with "Like a Prayer", though the music video caused controversy. Her album, from which this was the title track, also topped the charts and became one of her most critically acclaimed worldwide. The single was followed by three further top five hits in 1989: "Express Yourself" (number five), "Cherish" (number three) and "Dear Jessie", which peaked at number five over the Christmas period.

May saw the Christians, Holly Johnson, Paul McCartney, Gerry Marsden and producers Stock Aitken Waterman reach number one with a charity cover of the Gerry and the Pacemakers song "Ferry Cross the Mersey", released in aid of the Hillsborough disaster the previous month. The original reached number eight in 1964.

Two sounds dominated the summer and autumn. The first came from Jive Bunny and the Mastermixers: several old songs from the 1940s to 1960s were joined together to create a megamix, with "Jive Bunny" (an animated rabbit) featuring in the music videos. "Swing the Mood" topped the charts for five weeks from July, "That's What I Like" for three weeks in October, and "Let's Party" for one week in December. Unlike the first two, the last one sampled Christmas songs from the 1970s and 1980s. Jive Bunny became the third artist ever to have their first three singles reach number one, after Gerry and the Pacemakers and Frankie Goes to Hollywood.

The second was the Italo house sound of Black Box, whose "Ride on Time" was the biggest-selling single of the year, and, at six weeks, spent the longest time at number one. Though the song heavily sampled Loleatta Holloway's "Love Sensation" from 1980, the music video featured a different singer miming to Holloway's vocals. This prompted legal action, so later pressings of the single featured a different singer – the then little-known Heather Small, who later went on to fame as the lead singer of M People in the 1990s. The same production team behind Black Box also reached number nine under the group name Starlight with the hit single "Numero Uno". The Italo house sound continued with top ten hits from Mixmaster "Grand Piano" and FPI Project went to number nine with their version of "Going Back to My Roots/Rich in Paradise".

Along with Italo, the House music genre was still going strong in 1989. Inner City released numerous house hits during the year, which all entered the Top 40, the biggest being "Good Life", which reached number four in January. Coldcut introduced Lisa Stansfield with her debut single "People Hold On", which reached number 11 in April and stayed in the Top 75 for 9 weeks. This was followed by her first solo hit, "This Is the Right Time", which hit number 13, but in October, she made it all the way to the top with "All Around the World", which stayed at number one for two weeks.

The Rebel MC created a second wave house craze in October 1989 with his number-two hit "Street Tuff", and from Belgium, genre-defining Technotronic stormed to number two in November with their huge debut hit "Pump Up the Jam". Like Black Box, there was minor controversy over who was the actual singer of the track. The label officially credited French model Felly as the vocalist (who also appeared in the video); however, it was, in fact, American rapper Ya Kid K providing all the vocals. A third scandal involving credited vocalists also continued this year with the duo Milli Vanilli, who hit the headlines when it was revealed that neither of them had performed vocals on any of their debut singles, including this year's number two smash from November "Girl I'm Gonna Miss You".

The teen-sensations of 1988, Bros, lost momentum and a band member this year, so a new boyband took their title. From the United States came New Kids on the Block and they soon became the latest pop sensations in Britain. Their debut single, "Hangin' Tough", initially stalled early in the summer, but it was the follow-up "You Got It (The Right Stuff)" that went straight in at number one in the autumn. It would stay there for three weeks, paving the way for a re-release of "Hangin' Tough" in January 1990, and the multi-platinum success of their debut album of the same name.

The year's Christmas number one single, and, indeed, the final number one of the 1980s, went to a new version of 1984's Christmas number one "Do They Know It's Christmas?". Produced by Stock Aitken Waterman, Band Aid II, like the original Band Aid, featured numerous famous music stars of the day, including both Kylie Minogue and Jason Donovan, giving them the credit as appearing on both the first and last number one singles of the year. Donovan would also achieve the honour of the biggest selling album of the year with his "Ten Good Reasons" album going multi-platinum before the end of the year.

One of the highlights of the Proms was the première of John Tavener's The Protecting Veil, performed by Steven Isserlis and the London Symphony Orchestra. Two new works by John McCabe were also premièred during the year: Sam Variations for violin, viola, cello, doublebass and piano, commissioned and performed by the Schubert Ensemble of London, and String Quartet No 5, performed by the Gabrieli Quartet at the Fishguard Festival. A choral work by McCabe's, Proud Songsters, was written to celebrate the 70th birthday of Stephen Wilkinson.

== Events ==
- 7 January – The Chart Show moves from Channel 4 to ITV.
- 8 January – Compilation albums are moved from the UK Albums Chart into the new UK Compilation Chart.
- 14 January – Paul McCartney releases Снова в СССР (Back in the USSR) exclusively in the USSR.
- 21 January – The first performance of Walk By Quiet Water for orchestra, Op. 96 by British composer (but long-term US resident) Peter Racine Fricker, with the Santa Barbara Symphony Orchestra, conducted by Varujan Kojian, at the Arlington Theatre, Santa Barbara.
- 9 April – The Rolling Stones' Bill Wyman announces that he will marry 19-year-old Mandy Smith, his girlfriend for six years.
- 23 July – Former Beatle Ringo Starr forms his own band named Ringo Starr & His All-Starr Band.
- 17 August – The 6th Brecon Jazz Festival opens, in Brecon, Wales. Guest performers include George Melly.
- 29 August – World premiere of Quatrain for wind, brass and percussion by Colin Matthews in San Sebastian, Spain, with the London Symphony Orchestra conducted by Michael Tilson Thomas.
- 4 September – The premiere of John Tavener's The Protecting Veil took place at the Proms in the Royal Albert Hall, with soloist Steven Isserlis and the BBC Symphony Orchestra, conducted by Oliver Knussen.
- 10 September – Peter Maxwell Davies' Symphony No. 4 receives its premiere at a BBC Proms concert in the Royal Albert Hall, by the Scottish Chamber Orchestra conducted by the composer.
- November – Soprano Elizabeth Harwood, suffering from terminal cancer, makes her last stage performance, at the Bath Festival.
- date unknown – Peter Maxwell Davies succeeds David Willcocks as the President of the charity, Making Music.

== Charts ==
=== Number-one singles ===
Chart date (week ending)	Song	Artist(s)	Sales
7 January	"Especially for You"	Kylie Minogue and Jason Donovan	66,827
14 January	"Especially for You"	Kylie Minogue and Jason Donovan	78,407
21 January	"Especially for You"	Kylie Minogue and Jason Donovan	69,071
28 January	"Something's Gotten Hold of My Heart"	Marc Almond with Gene Pitney	60,979
4 February	"Something's Gotten Hold of My Heart"	Marc Almond with Gene Pitney	95,659
11 February	"Something's Gotten Hold of My Heart"	Marc Almond with Gene Pitney	84,235
18 February	"Something's Gotten Hold of My Heart"	Marc Almond with Gene Pitney	65,416
25 February	"Belfast Child"	Simple Minds	77,877
4 March	"Belfast Child"	Simple Minds	64,447
11 March	"Too Many Broken Hearts"	Jason Donovan	63,546
18 March	"Too Many Broken Hearts"	Jason Donovan	93,585
25 March	"Like a Prayer"	Madonna	92,514
1 April	"Like a Prayer"	Madonna	72,097
8 April	"Like a Prayer"	Madonna	43,367
15 April	"Eternal Flame"	The Bangles	48,671
22 April	"Eternal Flame"	The Bangles	86,717
29 April	"Eternal Flame"	The Bangles	78,387
6 May	"Eternal Flame"	The Bangles	72,029
13 May	"Hand on Your Heart"	Kylie Minogue	106,913
20 May	"Ferry 'Cross the Mersey"	The Christians, Holly Johnson, Paul McCartney, Gerry Marsden and Stock Aitken Waterman	99,348
27 May	"Ferry 'Cross the Mersey"	The Christians, Holly Johnson, Paul McCartney, Gerry Marsden and Stock Aitken Waterman	96,373
3 June	"Ferry 'Cross the Mersey"	The Christians, Holly Johnson, Paul McCartney, Gerry Marsden and Stock Aitken Waterman	63,427
10 June	"Sealed With a Kiss"	Jason Donovan	70,261
17 June	"Sealed With a Kiss"	Jason Donovan	89,692
24 June	"Back to Life (However Do You Want Me)"	Soul II Soul featuring Caron Wheeler	50,779
1 July	"Back to Life (However Do You Want Me)"	Soul II Soul featuring Caron Wheeler	66,368
8 July	"Back to Life (However Do You Want Me)"	Soul II Soul featuring Caron Wheeler	66,470
15 July	"Back to Life (However Do You Want Me)"	Soul II Soul featuring Caron Wheeler	50,592
22 July	"You'll Never Stop Me Loving You"	Sonia	54,672
29 July	"You'll Never Stop Me Loving You"	Sonia	60,520
5 August	"Swing the Mood"	Jive Bunny and the Mastermixers	100,130
12 August	"Swing the Mood"	Jive Bunny and the Mastermixers	155,669
19 August	"Swing the Mood"	Jive Bunny and the Mastermixers	122,154
26 August	"Swing the Mood"	Jive Bunny and the Mastermixers	95,455
2 September	"Swing the Mood"	Jive Bunny and the Mastermixers	82,229
9 September	"Ride on Time"	Black Box	71,434
16 September	"Ride on Time"	Black Box	96,951
23 September	"Ride on Time"	Black Box	97,257
30 September	"Ride on Time"	Black Box	88,757
7 October	"Ride on Time"	Black Box	84,252
14 October	"Ride on Time"	Black Box	73,746
21 October	"That's What I Like"	Jive Bunny and the Mastermixers	89,845
28 October	"That's What I Like"	Jive Bunny and the Mastermixers	92,718
4 November	"That's What I Like"	Jive Bunny and the Mastermixers	76,007
11 November	"All Around the World"	Lisa Stansfield	78,744
18 November	"All Around the World"	Lisa Stansfield	85,068
25 November	"You Got It (The Right Stuff)"	New Kids on the Block	60,996
2 December	"You Got It (The Right Stuff)"	New Kids on the Block	71,961
9 December	"You Got It (The Right Stuff)"	New Kids on the Block	53,873
16 December	"Let's Party"	Jive Bunny and the Mastermixers	72,641
23 December	"Do They Know It's Christmas?"	Band Aid II	175,596
30 December	"Do They Know It's Christmas?"	Band Aid II	209,763

=== Number-one albums ===
Chart date (week ending)	Album	Artist
7 January	Now 13	Various Artists
14 January	The Innocents	Erasure
21 January	The Legendary Roy Orbison	Roy Orbison
28 January	The Legendary Roy Orbison	Roy Orbison
4 February	The Legendary Roy Orbison	Roy Orbison
11 February	Technique	New Order
18 February	The Raw and the Cooked	Fine Young Cannibals
25 February	A New Flame	Simply Red
4 March	A New Flame	Simply Red
11 March	A New Flame	Simply Red
18 March	A New Flame	Simply Red
25 March	Anything for You	Gloria Estefan & Miami Sound Machine
1 April	Like a Prayer	Madonna
8 April	Like a Prayer	Madonna
15 April	When the World Knows Your Name	Deacon Blue
22 April	When the World Knows Your Name	Deacon Blue
29 April	A New Flame	Simply Red
6 May	Blast!	Holly Johnson
13 May	Street Fighting Years	Simple Minds
20 May	Ten Good Reasons	Jason Donovan
27 May	Ten Good Reasons	Jason Donovan
3 June	The Miracle	Queen
10 June	Ten Good Reasons	Jason Donovan
17 June	Ten Good Reasons	Jason Donovan
24 June	Flowers in the Dirt	Paul McCartney
1 July	Batman	Prince
8 July	Velveteen	Transvision Vamp
15 July	Club Classics Vol. One	Soul II Soul
22 July	A New Flame	Simply Red
29 July	A New Flame	Simply Red
5 August	Cuts Both Ways	Gloria Estefan
12 August	Cuts Both Ways	Gloria Estefan
19 August	Cuts Both Ways	Gloria Estefan
26 August	Cuts Both Ways	Gloria Estefan
2 September	Cuts Both Ways	Gloria Estefan
9 September	Cuts Both Ways	Gloria Estefan
16 September	Aspects of Love	London Stage Cast
23 September	We Too Are One	Eurythmics
30 September	Foreign Affair	Tina Turner
7 October	The Seeds of Love	Tears for Fears
14 October	Crossroads	Tracy Chapman
21 October	Enjoy Yourself	Kylie Minogue
28 October	Enjoy Yourself	Kylie Minogue
4 November	Wild!	Erasure
11 November	Wild!	Erasure
18 November	The Road to Hell	Chris Rea
25 November	The Road to Hell	Chris Rea
2 December	The Road to Hell	Chris Rea
9 December	...But Seriously	Phil Collins
16 December	...But Seriously	Phil Collins
23 December	...But Seriously	Phil Collins
30 December	...But Seriously	Phil Collins

=== Number-one compilation albums ===
Chart date (week ending)	Album
14 January	Now 13
21 January	The Premiere Collection: The Best of Andrew Lloyd Webber
28 January	The Premiere Collection: The Best of Andrew Lloyd Webber
4 February	The Marquee – Thirty Legendary Years
11 February	The Marquee – Thirty Legendary Years
18 February	The Marquee – Thirty Legendary Years
25 February	The Marquee – Thirty Legendary Years
4 March	The Awards
11 March	The Premiere Collection: The Best of Andrew Lloyd Webber
18 March	Deep Heat
25 March	Unforgettable 2
1 April	Now 14
8 April	Now 14
15 April	Now 14
22 April	Now 14
29 April	Now 14
6 May	Now 14
13 May	Now 14
20 May	Nite Flite 2
27 May	Nite Flite 2
3 June	Hits 10
10 June	Hits 10
17 June	Hits 10
24 June	Hits 10
1 July	Hits 10
8 July	Hits 10
15 July	Now Dance '89
22 July	Now Dance '89
29 July	Now Dance '89
5 August	Now Dance '89
12 August	Now Dance '89
19 August	Now Dance '89
26 August	Now 15
2 September	Now 15
9 September	Now 15
16 September	Now 15
23 September	Now 15
30 September	Deep Heat 4 – Play with Fire
7 October	Deep Heat 4 – Play with Fire
14 October	Deep Heat 4 – Play with Fire
21 October	Deep Heat 4 – Play with Fire
28 October	Deep Heat 4 – Play with Fire
4 November	Smash Hits Party '89
11 November	Smash Hits Party '89
18 November	Smash Hits Party '89
25 November	The 80s – The Best Album of the Decade
2 December	Now 16
9 December	Now 16
16 December	Now 16
23 December	Now 16
30 December	Now 16

== Year-end charts ==
=== Best-selling singles ===
No.	Title	Artist	Peak position	Estimated sales
1	"Ride on Time"	Black Box	1	850,000
2	"Swing the Mood"	Jive Bunny and the Mastermixers	1	820,000
3	"Eternal Flame"	The Bangles	1	500,000
4	"Too Many Broken Hearts"	Jason Donovan	1	
5	"Back to Life (However Do You Want Me)"	Soul II Soul featuring Caron Wheeler	1	
6	"Something's Gotten Hold of My Heart"	Marc Almond featuring Gene Pitney	1	
7	"That's What I Like"	Jive Bunny and the Mastermixers	1	
8	"Pump Up the Jam"	Technotronic featuring Felly	2	
9	"Do They Know It's Christmas?"	Band Aid II	1	450,000
10	"Hand on Your Heart"	Kylie Minogue	1	
11	"Like a Prayer"	Madonna	1	
12	"All Around the World"	Lisa Stansfield	1	
13	"If Only I Could"	Sydney Youngblood	3	
14	"Love Changes Everything"	Michael Ball	2	
15	"Girl I'm Gonna Miss You"	Milli Vanilli	2	
16	"You'll Never Stop Me Loving You"	Sonia	1	
17	"You Got It (The Right Stuff)"	New Kids on the Block	1	
18	"The Living Years"	Mike + the Mechanics	2	
19	"Ferry 'Cross the Mersey"	The Christians, Holly Johnson, Paul McCartney, Gerry Marsden and Stock, Aitken & Waterman	1	
20	"Miss You Like Crazy"	Natalie Cole	2	
21	"Wouldn't Change a Thing"	Kylie Minogue	2	
22	"This Time I Know It's for Real"	Donna Summer	3	
23	"Don't Know Much"	Linda Ronstadt featuring Aaron Neville	2	
24	"Let's Party"	Jive Bunny and the Mastermixers	1	
25	"Street Tuff"	Rebel MC and Double Trouble	3	
26	"Belfast Child"	Simple Minds	1	
27	"Requiem"	London Boys	4	
28	"French Kiss"	Lil Louis	2	
29	"Sealed with a Kiss"	Jason Donovan	1	
30	"Right Here Waiting"	Richard Marx	2	
31	"Straight Up"	Paula Abdul	3	
32	"Especially for You"	Kylie Minogue and Jason Donovan	1	
33	"You Got It"	Roy Orbison	3	
34	"Lambada"	Kaoma	4	
35	"Help!"	Bananarama/Lananeeneenoonoo	3	
36	"Stop!"	Sam Brown	4	
37	"When You Come Back to Me"	Jason Donovan	2	
38	"If You Don't Know Me by Now"	Simply Red	2	
39	"London Nights"	London Boys	2	
40	"Poison"	Alice Cooper	2	
41	"The Best"	Tina Turner	5	
42	"Love Train"	Holly Johnson	4	
43	"If I Could Turn Back Time"	Cher	6	
44	"Leave Me Alone"	Michael Jackson	2	
45	"Room in Your Heart"	Living in a Box	5	
46	"Another Day in Paradise"	Phil Collins	2	
47	"Song for Whoever"	The Beautiful South	2	
48	"Get a Life"	Soul II Soul	3	
49	"Baby I Don't Care"	Transvision Vamp	3	
50	"Leave a Light On"	Belinda Carlisle	4	

=== Best-selling albums ===
No.	Title	Artist	Peak position	Estimated sales
1	Ten Good Reasons	Jason Donovan	1	1,500,000
2	A New Flame	Simply Red	1	1,400,000
3	...But Seriously	Phil Collins	1	1,200,000
4	Anything for You	Gloria Estefan and Miami Sound Machine	1	1,050,000
5	Cuts Both Ways	Gloria Estefan	1	900,000
6	Enjoy Yourself	Kylie Minogue	1	800,000
7	The Raw and the Cooked	Fine Young Cannibals	1	
8	Foreign Affair	Tina Turner	1	
9	Like a Prayer	Madonna	1	
10	Club Classics Vol. One	Soul II Soul	1	750,000
11	Don't Be Cruel	Bobby Brown	3	
12	The Road to Hell	Chris Rea	1	
13	When the World Knows Your Name	Deacon Blue	1	
14	Jive Bunny: The Album	Jive Bunny and the Mastermixers	2	
15	Appetite for Destruction	Guns N' Roses	5	600,000
16	Street Fighting Years	Simple Minds	1	
17	The Miracle	Queen	1	
18	Wild!	Erasure	1	
19	The Twelve Commandments of Dance	London Boys	2	
20	We Too Are One	Eurythmics	1	
21	The Seeds of Love	Tears for Fears	1	
22	Raw Like Sushi	Neneh Cherry	2	
23	Affection	Lisa Stansfield	2	
24	Watermark	Enya	5	
25	Velveteen	Transvision Vamp	1	
26	The Legendary Roy Orbison	Roy Orbison	1	
27	Spark to a Flame: The Very Best of Chris de Burgh	Chris de Burgh	4	
28	Ancient Heart	Tanita Tikaram	3	
29	Holding Back the River	Wet Wet Wet	2	
30	Batman	Prince	1	
31	Pastpresent	Clannad	5	
32	Kylie	Kylie Minogue	2 (Note: Reached number 1 in 1988)	360,000
33	The Best of Rod Stewart	Rod Stewart	3	
34	Bad	Michael Jackson	4 (Note: Reached number 1 in 1987)	
35	Kick	INXS	9	
36	The Innocents	Erasure	1	
37	Paradise	Inner City	3	
38	Stronger	Cliff Richard	7	
39	The Sensual World	Kate Bush	1	
40	2 X 2	Milli Vanilli	6	
41	Everything	The Bangles	5	
42	Level Best	Level 42	5	
43	Mystery Girl	Roy Orbison	2	
44	Crossroads	Tracy Chapman	1	
45	Remote/Bitter Suite	Hue & Cry	10	
46	Runaway Horses	Belinda Carlisle	4	
47	Greatest Hits	Billy Ocean	4	
48	Welcome to the Beautiful South	The Beautiful South	2	
49	Blast	Holly Johnson	1	
50	Aspects of Love	Original Cast Recording	1	

== Classical music ==
- Malcolm Arnold – Four Welsh Dances, Op. 138
- Harrison Birtwistle – Salford Toccata
- John McCabe – String Quartet No. 5
- Nicholas Maw – Music of Memory
- Mark-Anthony Turnage – Some Days (song cycle)

== Film and incidental music ==
- Christopher Gunning – When the Whales Came
- Michael Nyman – The Cook, the Thief, his Wife and her Lover, directed by Peter Greenaway.

== Births ==
- 4 January – Labrinth, singer-songwriter, guitarist and producer
- 28 January – Carly Paoli, mezzo-soprano
- 24 January – Calvin Goldspink, singer and actor (S Club 8)
- 17 February – Stacey McClean, singer and actress (S Club 8)
- 27 February – Sam Sweeney, folk musician
- 20 February – Freya Waley-Cohen, composer
- 8 April – Alex Day, singer-songwriter and guitarist (Chameleon Circuit)
- 23 June – Lauren Bennett, singer and dancer (G.R.L. and Paradiso Girls)
- 28 June – Lucy Rose, singer-songwriter and guitarist
- 29 June – Rebecca Jane, singer
- 2 July – Tom Zanetti, DJ, music producer, and musician
- 12 October – Aggro Santos, Brazilian-English rapper
- 20 October – Jess Glynne, pop singer-songwriter
- 30 November – Daisy Evans (S Club 8)

== Deaths ==
- 11 January – Ray Moore, DJ, 47 (throat cancer)
- 23 January – Angus Morrison, pianist, 86
- 14 February – Vincent Crane, keyboardist (The Crazy World of Arthur Brown, Atomic Rooster), 45 (overdose)
- 19 March – Alan Civil, horn player, 59
- 1 April – Richard Austin, conductor, 85
- 22 April – Paul Beard, violinist, 88
- 18 May – Geoffrey Gilbert, flautist, 74
- 14 June – Pete de Freitas, rock drummer (Echo & the Bunnymen), 27 (road accident)
- 15 July – Dennis Wilson, composer, 69
- 23 July – Henry Raynor, musicologist, 72
- 1 August – John Ogdon, pianist, 52 (diabetes-related pneumonia)
- 2 September – Clifton Parker, composer, 84
- 5 September – William Mann, music critic, 65
- 1 October – Eric Ball, composer, 85
- 19 October – Alan Murphy, guitarist, member of Level 42 and Go West, 35 (AIDS-related)
- 22 October – Ewan MacColl, folk singer, 74
- 28 October – Henry Hall, bandleader, 91
- 13 November – Arthur Hutchings, composer and musicologist, 83
- 1 December – Billy Lyall, keyboardist of Pilot and Bay City Rollers, 46 (AIDS-related)
- 5 December – Sir John Pritchard, conductor, 71
- 21 December – Elsie Griffin, operatic soprano, 94
- 26 December – Sir Lennox Berkeley, composer, 86

== Music awards ==
=== BRIT Awards ===
The 1989 BRIT Awards winners were:

- Best classical recording: George Frideric Handel's – The Messiah
- Best music video: Michael Jackson – "Smooth Criminal"
- Best soundtrack: Buster
- British album: Fairground Attraction – The First of a Million Kisses
- British breakthrough act: Bros
- British female solo artist: Annie Lennox
- British group: Erasure
- British male solo artist: Phil Collins
- British single: Fairground Attraction – "Perfect"
- International breakthrough act: Tracy Chapman
- International female: Tracy Chapman
- International group: U2
- International male: Michael Jackson
- Outstanding contribution: Cliff Richard

== See also ==
- 1989 in British radio
- 1989 in British television
- 1989 in the United Kingdom
- List of British films of 1989
