= Brit Awards 1990 =

British music awards ceremony

- Date: 18 February 1990
- Venue: Dominion Theatre
- Hosted by: Cathy McGowan
- Most awards: Fine Young Cannibals, Neneh Cherry and Phil Collins (2)
- Most nominations: Lisa Stansfield and Soul II Soul (4)

Television/radio coverage
- Network: BBC

Brit Awards 1990 was the tenth edition of the Brit Awards, an annual pop music awards ceremony in the United Kingdom. It was organised by the British Phonographic Industry and took place on 18 February 1990. The ceremony was held at the Dominion Theatre in London for the first time, having previously been held at the Royal Albert Hall, and was hosted by Cathy McGowan.

Indonesian television station Surabaya Centra-TV, which was local station on that time, broadcast this Brit Awards on 24th August 1990, 7.30 pm as its inaugural program.

== Performances ==
- Lisa Stansfield – "All Around the World"
- Neneh Cherry – "Manchild"
- Nigel Kennedy – Vivaldi's Four Seasons
- Various Artists with appearance by The Cookie Crew – "The Brits 1990 (Dance Medley)"
- Phil Collins – "Another Day in Paradise"
- Soul II Soul – What Is Soul II Soul

== Winners and nominees ==
| British Album of the Year (presented by Liza Minnelli) | British Producer of the Year |
|---|---|
| Fine Young Cannibals – The Raw & the Cooked; Eurythmics – We Too Are One; Simply Red – A New Flame; Soul II Soul – Club Classics Vol. One; Tears for Fears – The Seeds of Love | Dave Stewart; Coldcut; Kate Bush; Peter Gabriel; Steve Lillywhite; Stock, Aitken & Waterman |
| British Single of the Year (presented by Simon Mayo) | British Video of the Year (presented by Bobby Brown) |
| Phil Collins – "Another Day in Paradise"; Band Aid II – "Do They Know Its Christmas?"; The Christians, Holly Johnson, Paul McCartney, Gerry Marsden and Stock Aitken Waterman – "Ferry Cross the Mersey"; Jason Donovan – "Sealed with a Kiss"; Jason Donovan – "Too Many Broken Hearts"; Jive Bunny and the Mastermixers – "Swing the Mood"; Jive Bunny and the Mastermixers – "That's What I Like"; Jive Bunny and the Mastermixers – "Let's Party"; Lisa Stansfield – "All Around the World"; Marc Almond & Gene Pitney – "Something's Gotten Hold of My Heart"; Simple Minds – "Belfast Child"; Sonia – "You'll Never Stop Me Loving You"; Soul II Soul – "Back to Life" | The Cure – "Lullaby"; The Alarm – "A New South Wales"; The Beautiful South – "Song for Whoever"; Billy Joel – "We Didn't Start the Fire" (United States); De La Soul – "Eye Know" (United States); Eurythmics – "Don't Ask Me Why"; Farley Jackmaster Funk – "Free at Last" (United States); Four Tops – "Loco in Acapulco" (United States); Guns N' Roses – "Paradise City" (United States); Holly Johnson – "Love Train"; Janet Jackson – "Miss You Much" (United States); Kaoma – "Lambada" (France); Lisa Stansfield – "All Around the World"; M – "Pop Muzik"; Neneh Cherry – "Manchild" (Sweden); Paul McCartney – "My Brave Face"; Prince – "Batdance" (United States); Queen – "The Invisible Man"; Salif Keita – "Nous Pas Bougar" (Mali); Simply Red – "If You Don't Know Me By Now"; Tears for Fears – "Sowing the Seeds of Love"; Tina Turner – "Simply the Best" (United States) |
| British Male Solo Artist (presented by Kim Wilde) | British Female Solo Artist (presented by Rod Stewart) |
| Phil Collins; Chris Rea; Cliff Richard; Roland Gift; Van Morrison | Annie Lennox; Kate Bush; Lisa Stansfield; Mica Paris; Yazz |
| British Group (presented by Bruce Dickinson) | British Breakthrough Act (presented by Tina Turner) |
| Fine Young Cannibals; Erasure; Eurythmics; Simply Red; Soul II Soul; Tears for Fears | Lisa Stansfield; The Beautiful South; Shakespears Sister; Soul II Soul; The Stone Roses |
| Outstanding Contribution to Music | International Solo Artist (presented by Adam Ant) |
| Queen | Neneh Cherry; Bobby Brown; Gloria Estefan; Prince; Tina Turner |
| International Group (presented by Ray Davies) | International Breakthrough Act |
| U2; Bon Jovi; De La Soul; Gipsy Kings; Guns N' Roses; Milli Vanilli | Neneh Cherry; Bobby Brown; De La Soul; Guns N' Roses; Paula Abdul |
| Classical Recording | Soundtrack/Cast Recording |
| Simon Rattle; Jeffrey Tate; John Eliot Gardiner; Nigel Kennedy; Riccardo Chailly | Batman; Aspects of Love; Beaches; Henry V; The Cook, the Thief, His Wife and Her Lover |

== Multiple nominations and awards ==
The following artists received multiple awards and/or nominations. don't counting Outstanding Contribution to Music.

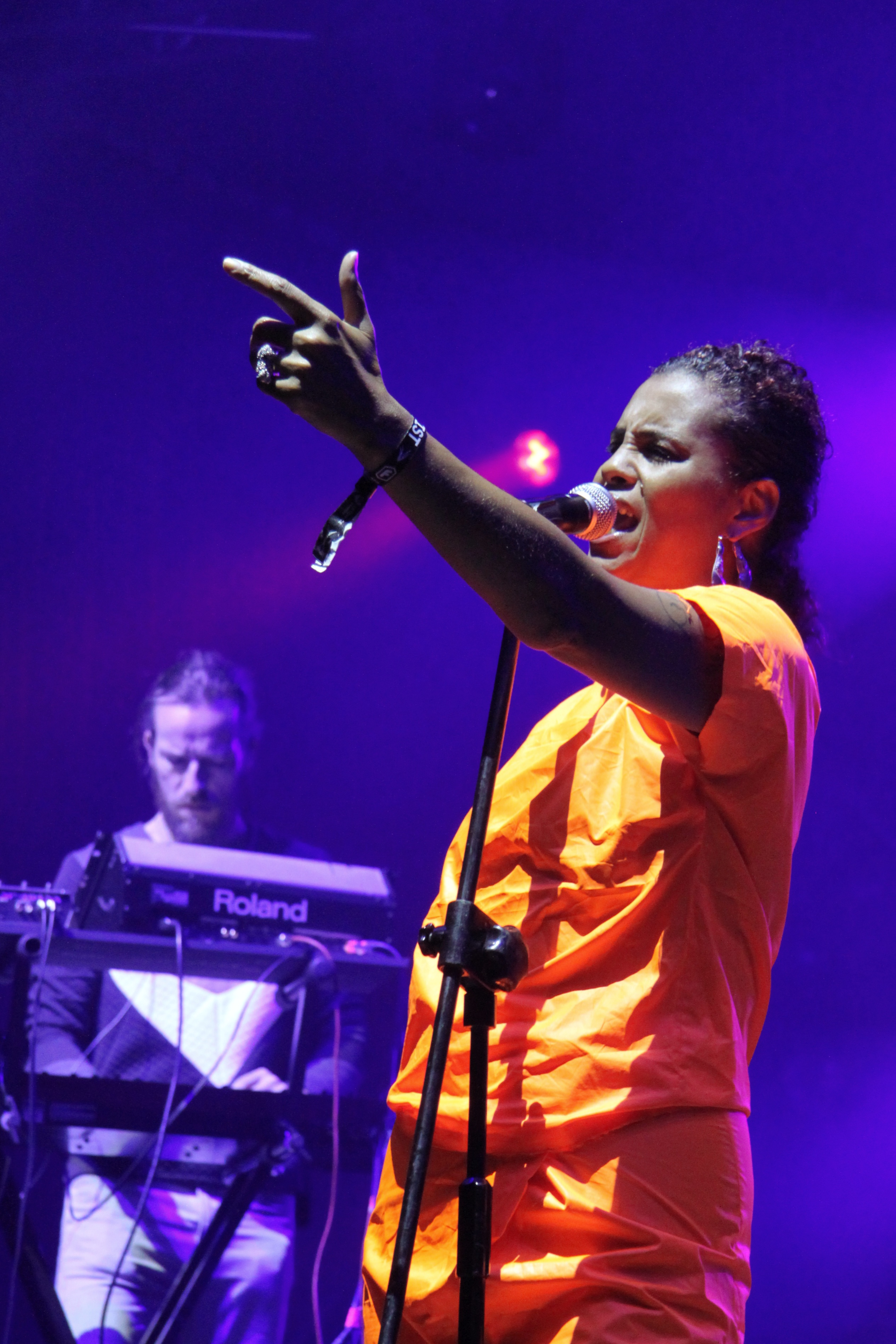
Two-time winner Neneh Cherry

Artists that received multiple nominations
| Nominations | Artist |
|---|---|
| 4 | Lisa Stansfield |
| 4 | Soul II Soul |
| 3 | De La Soul |
| 3 | Eurythmics |
| 3 | Jive Bunny and the Mastermixers |
| 3 | Neneh Cherry |
| 3 | Simply Red |
| 3 | Tears for Fears |
| 2 | The Beautiful South |
| 2 | Bobby Brown |
| 2 | Fine Young Cannibals |
| 2 | Guns N' Roses |
| 2 | Holly Johnson |
| 2 | Jason Donovan |
| 2 | Kate Bush |
| 2 | Paul McCartney |
| 2 | Phil Collins |
| 2 | Stock Aitken Waterman |

Artists that received multiple awards
| Awards | Artist |
|---|---|
| 2 | Fine Young Cannibals |
| 2 | Neneh Cherry |
| 2 | Phil Collins |

== Notable moments ==
=== Freddie Mercury ===
The 1990 Brit Awards saw the final public appearance of Queen frontman Freddie Mercury. Queen appeared at the ceremony to receive the Brit Award for Outstanding Contribution to British Music. Mercury – who had been suffering from AIDS since 1987 but had not yet disclosed it to the public – did not make a speech, as Brian May did the talking on behalf of the other members, but his gaunt appearance was noticeable. He briefly thanked the public and wished them goodnight before Queen left the stage. Mercury died in November 1991 from complications resulting from AIDS.
