= List of UK singles chart number ones of the 1980s =

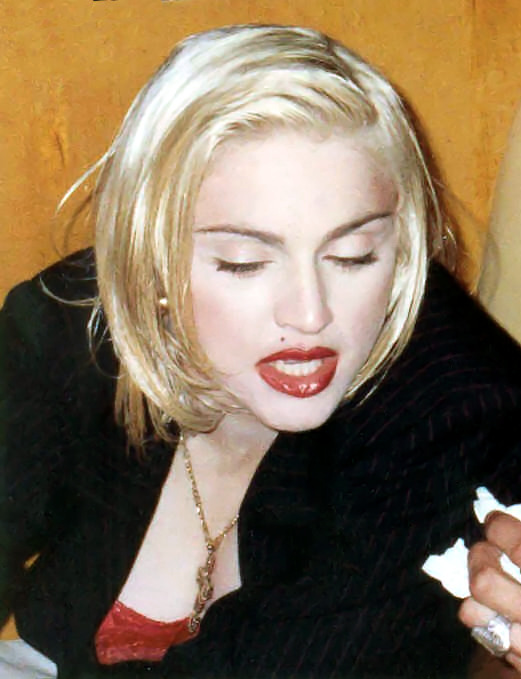
Madonna had six number ones during the 1980s.

The UK singles chart is the official record chart in the United Kingdom. Until 1983, it was compiled weekly by the British Market Research Bureau (BMRB) on behalf of the British record industry with a two-week break each Christmas. The BMRB used motorcycle couriers to collect the sales figures taken up to the close of trade on Saturday. This data was compiled on Monday and given to the BBC on Tuesday to be announced on BBC Radio 1 at lunchtime and later published in Music Week. On 4 January 1983, the chart was taken over by Gallup who expanded the chart from the Top 75 to the Top 100 and began the introduction of computerised tills, which automated the data collection process. The chart was based entirely on sales of physical singles from retail outlets and announced on Tuesday until October 1987, when the Top 40 was revealed each Sunday, due to the new automated process.

During the 1980s, there were a total of 191 singles that took the UK chart number 1 spot. In terms of number-one singles, Madonna was the most successful single act of the decade, as six of her singles reached the top spot. George Michael had significant involvement with eight number-one singles; with two number-one singles as a solo artist, four as a member of pop duo Wham!, one as a duet with Aretha Franklin and one as a member of charity supergroup Band Aid. The longest duration of a single at number one was nine weeks, achieved by Frankie Goes to Hollywood's "Two Tribes" in 1984.

The best-selling single of the decade was "Do They Know It's Christmas?" by Band Aid, selling more than 3.5 million copies, and passing "Mull of Kintyre" by Wings to become the best-selling single ever. "Do They Know It's Christmas?" is currently the second best-selling song after "Candle in the Wind 1997" by Elton John.

The 1980s saw the introduction of the cassette single (or "cassingle") alongside the 7-inch and 12-inch record formats and in 1987 major record labels developed a common format for the CD single. For the chart week ending 3 May 1989, chart regulations confined Kylie Minogue's song "Hand on Your Heart" to number two. Minogue would have reached number one if sales from cassette singles were included but they were sold for £1.99 – cheaper than was allowed at the time. Following the debacle the British Phonographic Industry reduced the minimum price for cassette singles to become eligible towards sales figures.

== Number-one singles ==
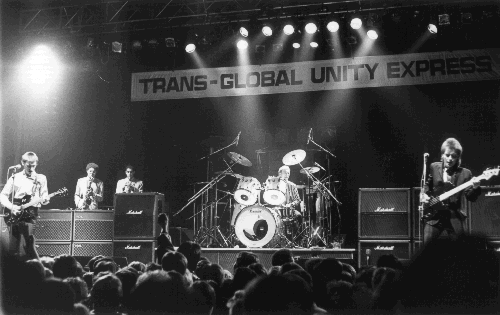
The Jam achieved four number ones during the 1980s, with three of them - "Going Underground", "Town Called Malice" and "Beat Surrender" - entering the chart at number one.

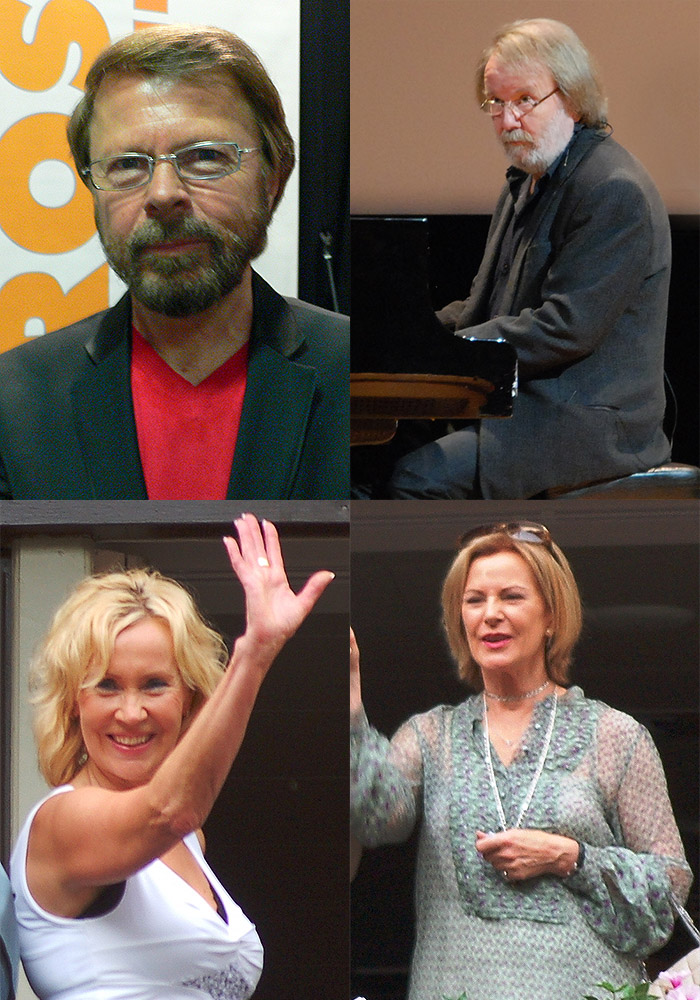
In 1980 ABBA scored their two most recent number ones, their last being Super Trouper.

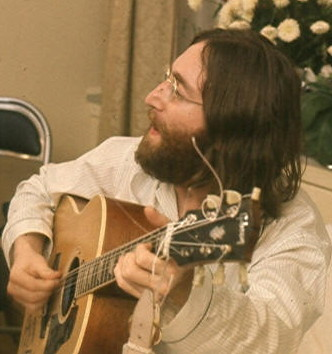
John Lennon was murdered in 1980, and three of his singles reached number one posthumously.

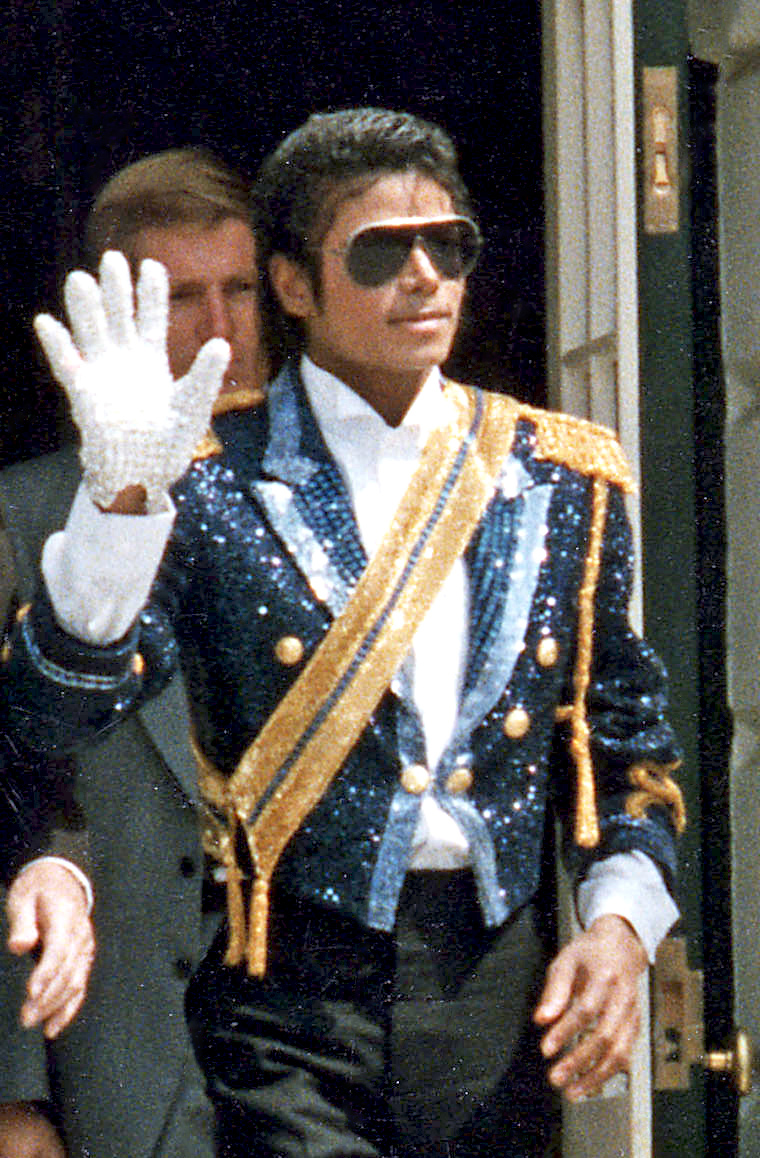
Michael Jackson had three number-one singles in the 1980s, scoring his first ever number-one single in 1981 with "One Day in Your Life", followed by "Billie Jean" in 1983 and "I Just Can't Stop Loving You" in 1987.

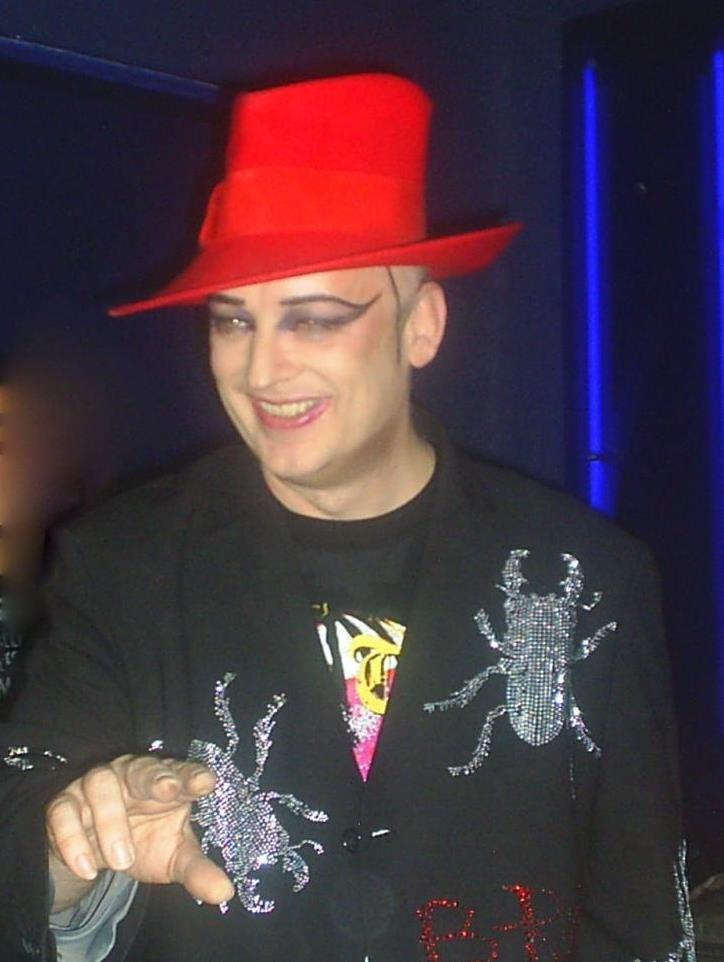
During the 1980s, Culture Club had two number ones, including the best-selling single of 1983, "Karma Chameleon". Frontman Boy George would later achieve a solo number one in 1987.

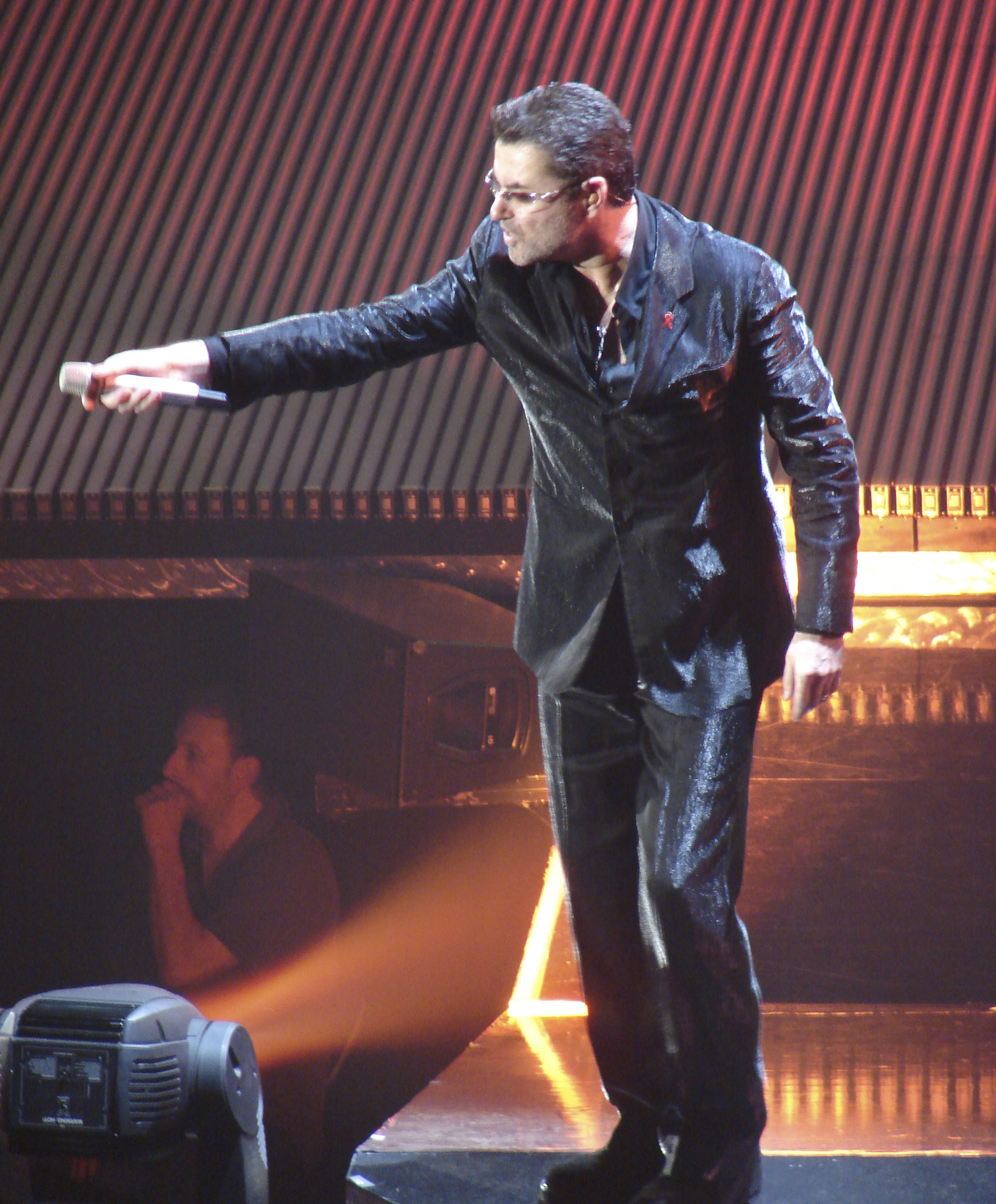
George Michael was one of the most successful artists of the 1980s, with three number-one singles as a solo artist and four as part of Wham!.

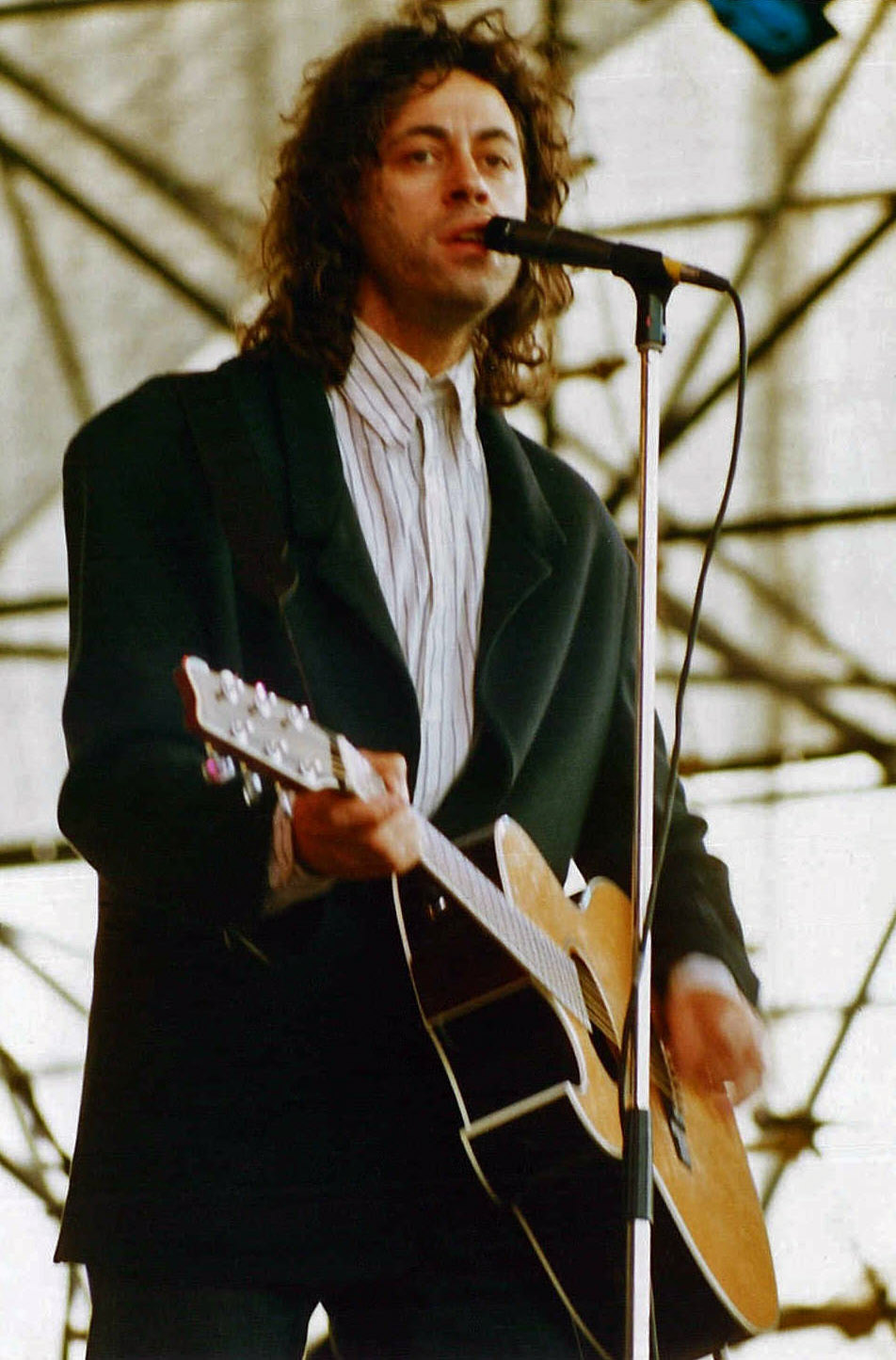
Bob Geldof co-wrote "Do They Know It's Christmas?", which was the biggest-selling single of the decade.

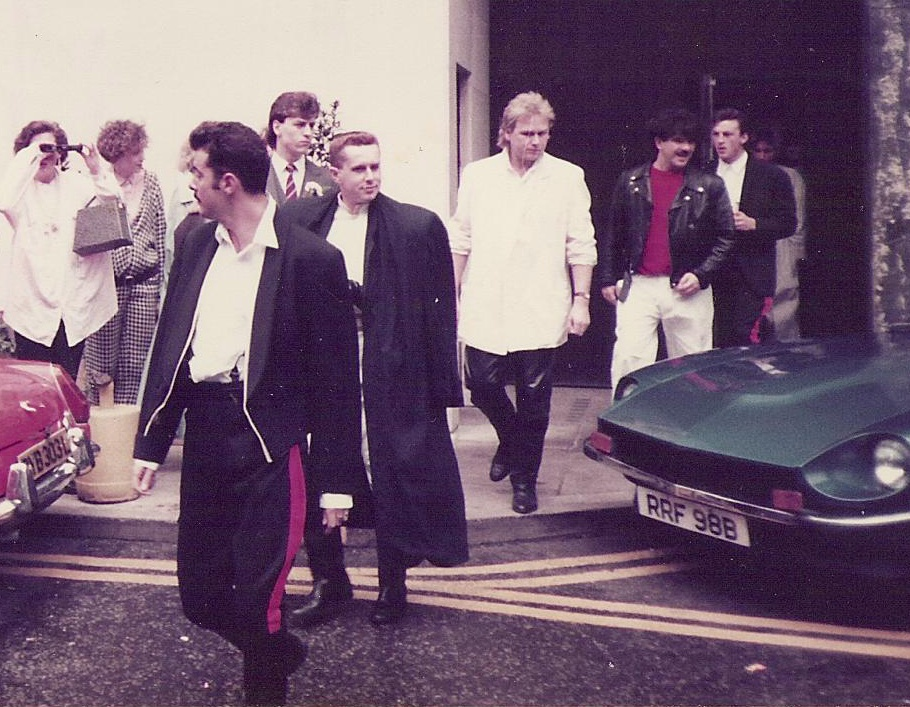
Frankie Goes to Hollywood had three consecutive singles reach number one, of which two, "Relax" and "Two Tribes", sold more than one million copies.

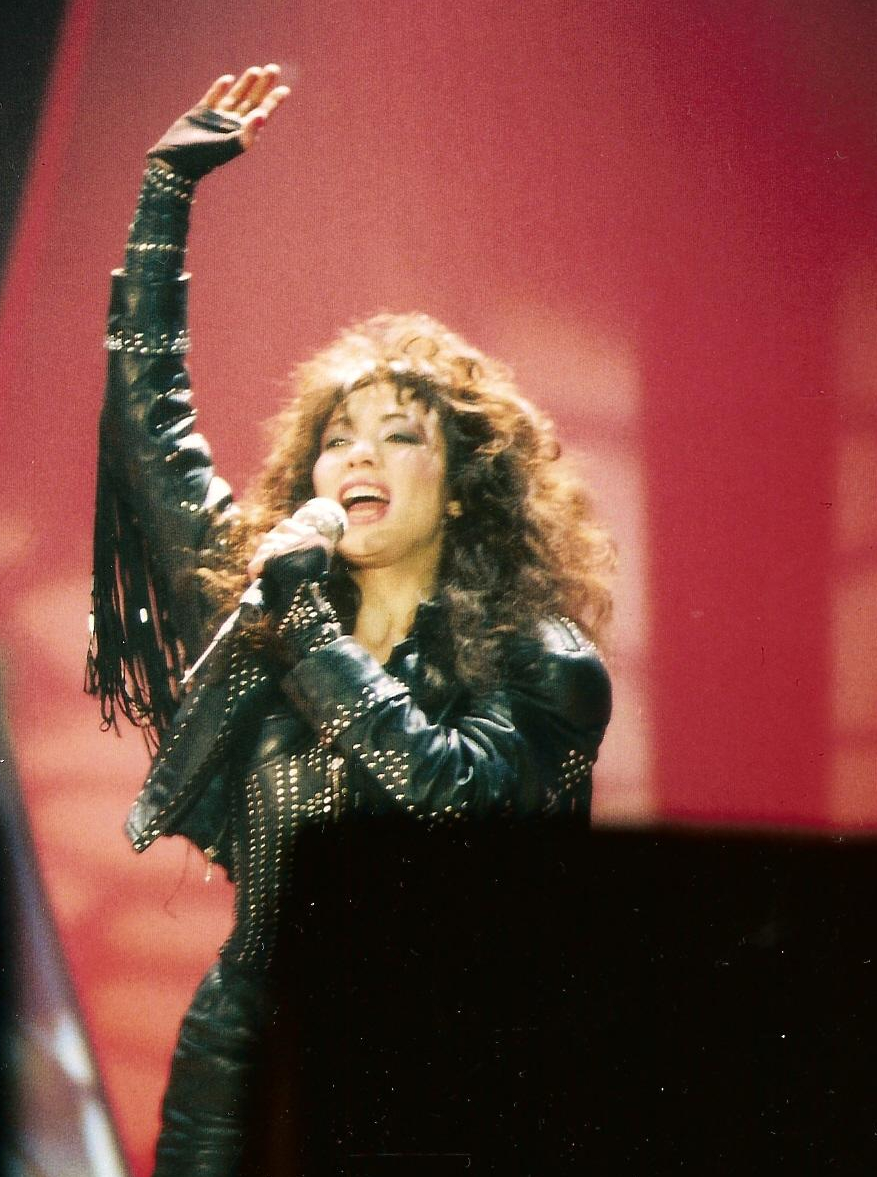
In 1985, Jennifer Rush was the first female artist to have a single sell more than a million copies, with "The Power of Love".

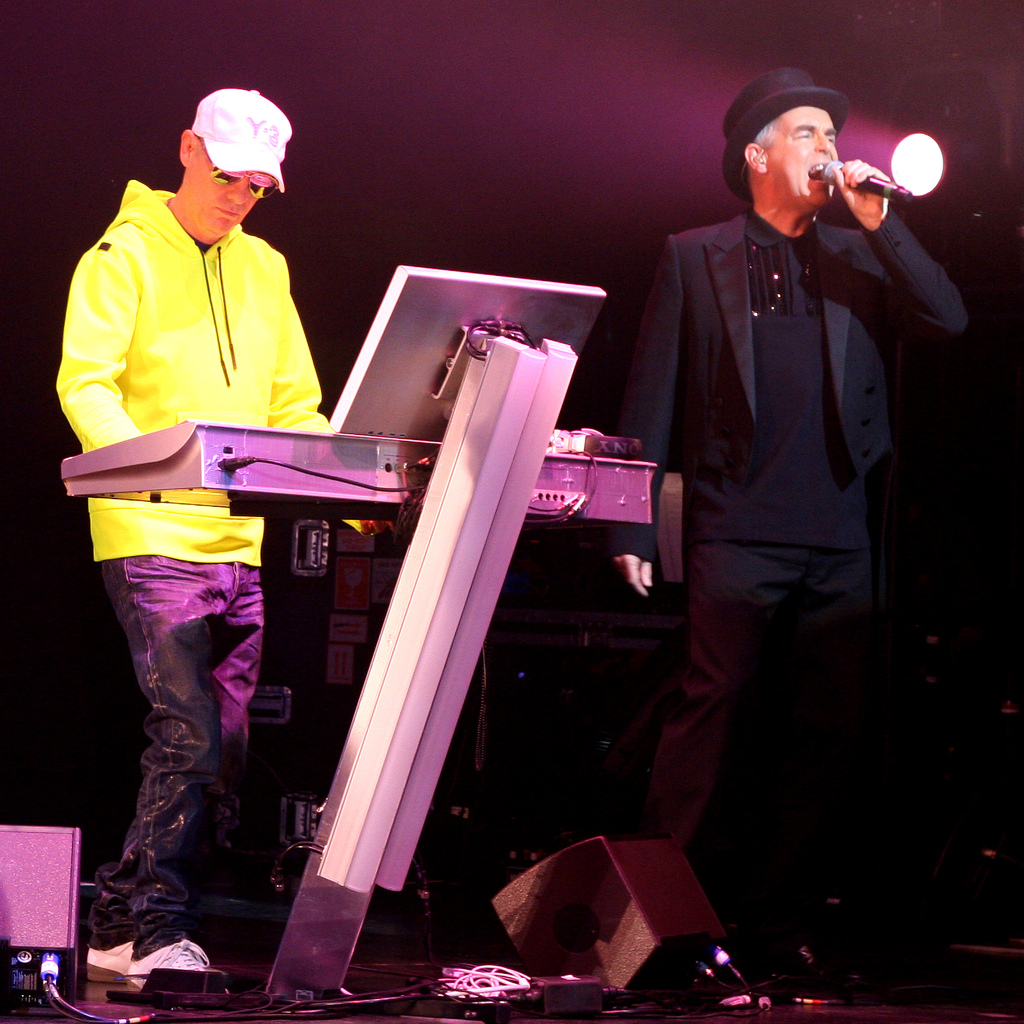
During the 1980s, the Pet Shop Boys gained four number ones, "West End Girls", "It's a Sin", "Always on My Mind" and "Heart".

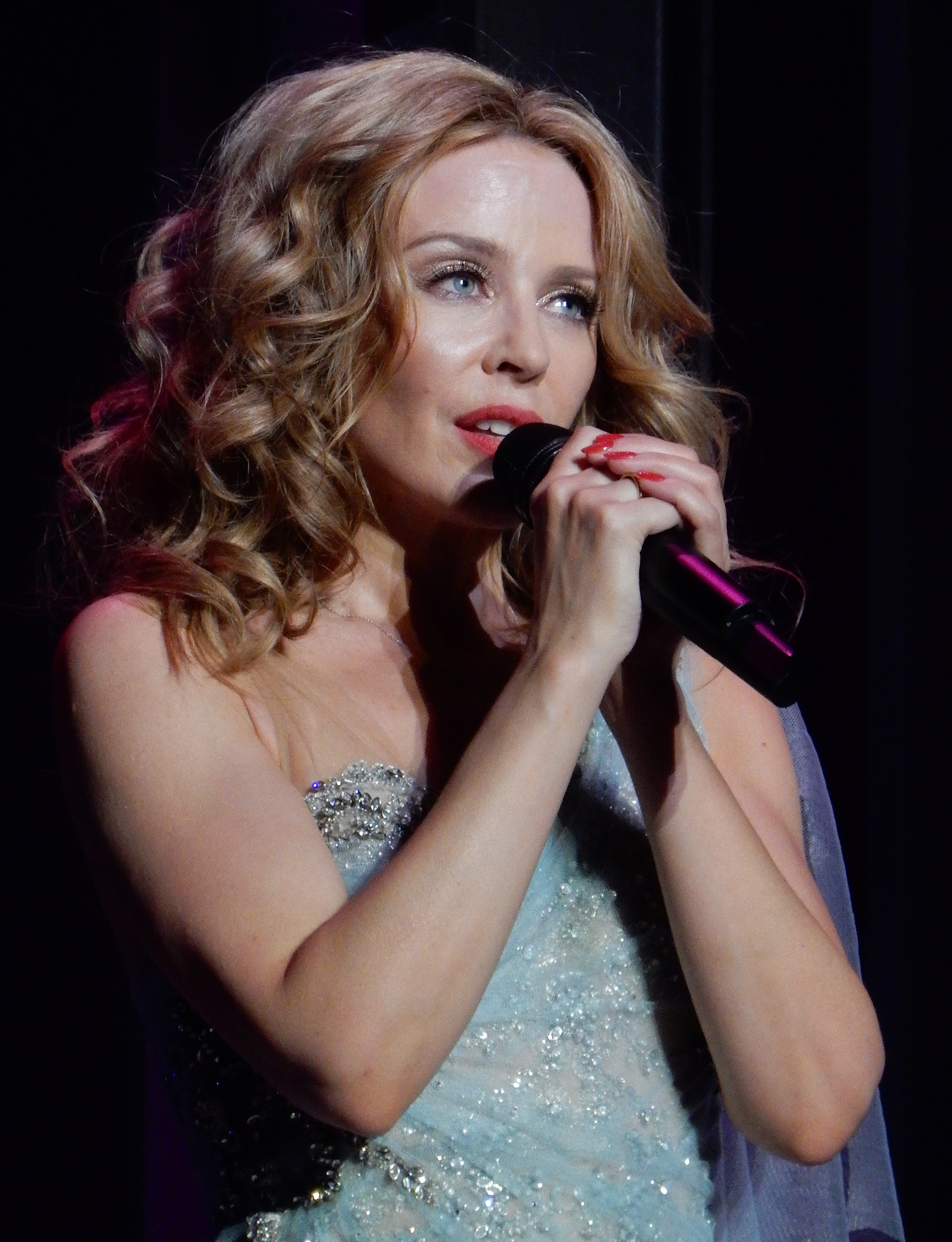
In 1988, Kylie Minogue went to number one with her debut UK single "I Should Be So Lucky", and achieved two more number ones in 1989.

Key
†	Best-selling single of the year
‡	Best-selling single of the decade

No.	Artist (Note: The artist, song name, week-ending date of number-one and consecutive number of weeks at the top are those given by The Official Charts Company. The dates are those for the Saturday after publication. The actual sales week represented is that up to and including the previous Saturday (i.e. from 13 to 7 days prior to the chart date).)	Single	Record label (Note: The record labels are those given by the OCC.)	Week ending date	Weeks at number one
1980
448	Pink Floyd	"Another Brick in the Wall (Part II)"	Harvest	15 December 1979	5
449	Pretenders	"Brass in Pocket"	Real	19 January 1980	2
450	The Special A.K.A.	Too Much Too Young – The Special A.K.A. Live! (EP) (Note: This number-one record was not a single but a five-track extended play (EP) with "Too Much Too Young" as the lead track. The rules now require at most four distinct songs to be eligible for the UK singles chart. Although the EP is credited to The Special A.K.A. on the record sleeve the record label credits The Specials.)	2 Tone	2 February 1980	2
451	Kenny Rogers	"Coward of the County"	United Artists	16 February 1980	2
452	Blondie	"Atomic"	Chrysalis	1 March 1980	2
453	Fern Kinney	"Together We Are Beautiful"	WEA	15 March 1980	1
454	The Jam	"Going Underground" / "Dreams of Children"	Polydor	22 March 1980	3
455	The Detroit Spinners	"Working My Way Back to You – Forgive Me Girl"	Atlantic	12 April 1980	2
456	Blondie	"Call Me"	Chrysalis	26 April 1980	1
457	Dexys Midnight Runners	"Geno"	Late Night Feelings	3 May 1980	2
458	Johnny Logan	"What's Another Year"	Epic	17 May 1980	2
459	The Mash	"Theme from M*A*S*H (Suicide is Painless)"	CBS	31 May 1980	3
460	Don McLean	"Crying"	EMI	21 June 1980	3
461	Olivia Newton-John and Electric Light Orchestra	"Xanadu"	Jet	12 July 1980	2
462	Odyssey	"Use It Up and Wear It Out"	RCA	26 July 1980	2
463	ABBA	"The Winner Takes It All"	Epic	9 August 1980	2
464	David Bowie	"Ashes to Ashes"	RCA	23 August 1980	2
465	The Jam	"Start!"	Polydor	6 September 1980	1
466	Kelly Marie	"Feels Like I'm in Love"	Calibre Plus	13 September 1980	2
467	The Police	"Don't Stand So Close to Me" †	A&M	27 September 1980	4
468	Barbra Streisand	"Woman in Love"	CBS	25 October 1980	3
469	Blondie	"The Tide Is High"	Chrysalis	15 November 1980	2
470	ABBA	"Super Trouper"	Epic	29 November 1980	3
471	John Lennon	"(Just Like) Starting Over"	Geffen	20 December 1980	1
472	St Winifred's School Choir	"There's No One Quite Like Grandma"	MFP	27 December 1980	2
1981
473	John Lennon	"Imagine"	Apple	10 January 1981	4
474	John Lennon	"Woman"	Geffen	7 February 1981	2
475	Joe Dolce Music Theatre	"Shaddap You Face"	Epic	21 February 1981	3
476	Roxy Music	"Jealous Guy"	E.G.	14 March 1981	2
477	Shakin' Stevens	"This Ole House"	Epic	28 March 1981	3
478	Bucks Fizz	"Making Your Mind Up"	RCA	18 April 1981	3
479	Adam and the Ants	"Stand and Deliver"	CBS	9 May 1981	5
480	Smokey Robinson	"Being with You"	Motown	13 June 1981	2
481	Michael Jackson	"One Day In Your Life"	Motown	27 June 1981	2
482	The Specials	"Ghost Town"	2 Tone	11 July 1981	3
483	Shakin' Stevens	"Green Door"	Epic	1 August 1981	4
484	Aneka	"Japanese Boy"	Hansa	29 August 1981	1
485	Soft Cell	"Tainted Love"	Some Bizzare	5 September 1981	2
486	Adam and the Ants	"Prince Charming"	CBS	19 September 1981	4
487	Dave Stewart with Barbara Gaskin	"It's My Party"	Stiff	17 October 1981	4
488	The Police	"Every Little Thing She Does Is Magic"	A&M	14 November 1981	1
489	Queen and David Bowie	"Under Pressure"	EMI	21 November 1981	2
490	Julio Iglesias	"Begin the Beguine (Volver a Empezar)"	CBS	5 December 1981	1
491	The Human League	"Don't You Want Me" † (Note: Until 2021, "Tainted Love" was recognised as the best-selling single of 1981. However, the Official Charts Company compiled a new list using updated sales information, which instead placed "Don't You Want Me" at the top with 1.15 million copies sold, compared to 1.05 million for "Tainted Love".)	Virgin	12 December 1981	5
1982
492	Bucks Fizz	"The Land of Make Believe"	RCA	16 January 1982	2
493	Shakin' Stevens	"Oh Julie"	Epic	30 January 1982	1
494	Kraftwerk	"The Model" / "Computer Love"	EMI	6 February 1982	1
495	The Jam	"Town Called Malice" / "Precious"	Polydor	13 February 1982	3
496	Tight Fit	"The Lion Sleeps Tonight"	Jive	6 March 1982	3
497	Goombay Dance Band	"Seven Tears"	Epic	27 March 1982	3
498	Bucks Fizz	"My Camera Never Lies"	RCA	17 April 1982	1
499	Paul McCartney and Stevie Wonder	"Ebony and Ivory"	Parlophone	24 April 1982	3
500	Nicole	"A Little Peace"	CBS	15 May 1982	2
501	Madness	"House of Fun"	Stiff	29 May 1982	2
502	Adam Ant	"Goody Two Shoes"	CBS	12 June 1982	2
503	Charlene	"I've Never Been to Me"	Motown	26 June 1982	1
504	Captain Sensible	"Happy Talk"	A&M	3 July 1982	2
505	Irene Cara	"Fame"	RSO	17 July 1982	3
506	Dexys Midnight Runners	"Come On Eileen" †	Mercury	7 August 1982	4
507	Survivor	"Eye of the Tiger"	Scotti Bros.	4 September 1982	4
508	Musical Youth	"Pass the Dutchie"	MCA	2 October 1982	3
509	Culture Club	"Do You Really Want to Hurt Me"	Virgin	23 October 1982	3
510	Eddy Grant	"I Don't Wanna Dance"	Ice	13 November 1982	3
511	The Jam	"Beat Surrender"	Polydor	4 December 1982	2
512	Renée and Renato	"Save Your Love"	Hollywood	18 December 1982	4
1983
513	Phil Collins	"You Can't Hurry Love"	Virgin	15 January 1983	2
514	Men at Work	"Down Under"	Epic	29 January 1983	3
515	Kajagoogoo	"Too Shy"	EMI	19 February 1983	2
516	Michael Jackson	"Billie Jean"	Epic	5 March 1983	1
517	Bonnie Tyler	"Total Eclipse of the Heart"	CBS	12 March 1983	2
518	Duran Duran	"Is There Something I Should Know?"	EMI	26 March 1983	2
519	David Bowie	"Let's Dance"	EMI America	9 April 1983	3
520	Spandau Ballet	"True"	Chrysalis	30 April 1983	4
521	New Edition	"Candy Girl"	London	28 May 1983	1
522	The Police	"Every Breath You Take"	A&M	4 June 1983	4
523	Rod Stewart	"Baby Jane"	Warner Bros.	2 July 1983	3
524	Paul Young	"Wherever I Lay My Hat (That's My Home)"	CBS	23 July 1983	3
525	KC and the Sunshine Band	"Give It Up"	Epic	13 August 1983	3
526	UB40	"Red Red Wine"	DEP International	3 September 1983	3
527	Culture Club	"Karma Chameleon" †	Virgin	24 September 1983	6
528	Billy Joel	"Uptown Girl"	CBS	5 November 1983	5
529	The Flying Pickets	"Only You"	10	10 December 1983	5
1984
530	Paul McCartney	"Pipes of Peace"	Parlophone	14 January 1984	2
531	Frankie Goes to Hollywood	"Relax"	ZTT	28 January 1984	5
532	Nena	"99 Red Balloons"	Epic	3 March 1984	3
533	Lionel Richie	"Hello"	Motown	24 March 1984	6
534	Duran Duran	"The Reflex"	EMI	5 May 1984	4
535	Wham!	"Wake Me Up Before You Go-Go"	Epic	2 June 1984	2
536	Frankie Goes to Hollywood	"Two Tribes"	ZTT	16 June 1984	9
537	George Michael	"Careless Whisper"	Epic	18 August 1984	3
538	Stevie Wonder	"I Just Called to Say I Love You"	Motown	8 September 1984	6
539	Wham!	"Freedom"	Epic	20 October 1984	3
540	Chaka Khan	"I Feel for You"	Warner Bros.	10 November 1984	3
541	Jim Diamond	"I Should Have Known Better"	A&M	1 December 1984	1
542	Frankie Goes to Hollywood	"The Power of Love"	ZTT	8 December 1984	1
543	Band Aid	"Do They Know It's Christmas?" ‡	Mercury	15 December 1984	5
1985
544	Foreigner	"I Want to Know What Love Is"	Atlantic	19 January 1985	3
545	Elaine Paige and Barbara Dickson	"I Know Him So Well"	RCA	9 February 1985	4
546	Dead or Alive	"You Spin Me Round (Like a Record)"	Epic	9 March 1985	2
547	Philip Bailey and Phil Collins	"Easy Lover"	CBS	23 March 1985	4
548	USA for Africa	"We Are the World"	CBS	20 April 1985	2
549	Phyllis Nelson	"Move Closer"	Carrere	4 May 1985	1
550	Paul Hardcastle	"19"	Chrysalis	11 May 1985	5
551	The Crowd	"You'll Never Walk Alone"	Spartan	15 June 1985	2
552	Sister Sledge	"Frankie"	Atlantic	29 June 1985	4
553	Eurythmics	"There Must Be an Angel (Playing with My Heart)"	RCA	27 July 1985	1
554	Madonna	"Into the Groove"	Sire	3 August 1985	4
555	UB40 and Chrissie Hynde	"I Got You Babe"	DEP International	31 August 1985	1
556	David Bowie and Mick Jagger	"Dancing in the Street"	EMI America	7 September 1985	4
557	Midge Ure	"If I Was"	Chrysalis	5 October 1985	1
558	Jennifer Rush	"The Power of Love" †	CBS	12 October 1985	5
559	Feargal Sharkey	"A Good Heart"	Virgin	16 November 1985	2
560	Wham!	"I'm Your Man"	Epic	30 November 1985	2
561	Whitney Houston	"Saving All My Love for You"	Arista	14 December 1985	2
562	Shakin' Stevens	"Merry Christmas Everyone"	Epic	28 December 1985	2
1986
563	Pet Shop Boys	"West End Girls"	Parlophone	11 January 1986	2
564	A-ha	"The Sun Always Shines on T.V."	Warner Bros.	25 January 1986	2
565	Billy Ocean	"When the Going Gets Tough, the Tough Get Going"	Jive	8 February 1986	4
566	Diana Ross	"Chain Reaction"	Capitol	8 March 1986	3
567	Cliff Richard and the Young Ones featuring Hank Marvin	"Living Doll"	WEA	29 March 1986	3
568	George Michael	"A Different Corner"	Epic	19 April 1986	3
569	Falco	"Rock Me Amadeus"	A&M	10 May 1986	1
570	Spitting Image	"The Chicken Song"	Virgin	17 May 1986	3
571	Doctor and the Medics	"Spirit in the Sky"	IRS	7 June 1986	3
572	Wham!	"The Edge of Heaven"	Epic	28 June 1986	2
573	Madonna	"Papa Don't Preach"	Sire	12 July 1986	3
574	Chris de Burgh	"The Lady in Red"	A&M	2 August 1986	3
575	Boris Gardiner	"I Want to Wake Up with You"	Revue	23 August 1986	3
576	The Communards with Sarah Jane Morris	"Don't Leave Me This Way" †	London	13 September 1986	4
577	Madonna	"True Blue"	Sire	11 October 1986	1
578	Nick Berry	"Every Loser Wins"	BBC	18 October 1986	3
579	Berlin	"Take My Breath Away"	CBS	8 November 1986	4
580	Europe	"The Final Countdown"	Epic	6 December 1986	2
581	The Housemartins	"Caravan of Love"	Go! Discs	20 December 1986	1
582	Jackie Wilson	"Reet Petite"	SMP	27 December 1986	4
1987
583	Steve "Silk" Hurley	"Jack Your Body" (Note: "Jack Your Body" was released on a 12" single that was more than 25 minutes long, exceeding the maximum time for a record to be classified as a single. The track should have been classified as an album instead and, during the two weeks it spent at number one, "Reet Petite" would have been number one for a fifth week and "I Knew You Were Waiting (For Me)" would have become number one a week earlier.)	DJ International	24 January 1987	2
584	Aretha Franklin and George Michael	"I Knew You Were Waiting (For Me)"	Epic	7 February 1987	2
585	Ben E. King	"Stand by Me"	Atlantic	21 February 1987	3
586	Boy George	"Everything I Own"	Virgin	14 March 1987	2
587	Mel and Kim	"Respectable"	Supreme	28 March 1987	1
588	Ferry Aid	"Let It Be"	CBS	4 April 1987	3
589	Madonna	"La Isla Bonita"	Sire	25 April 1987	2
590	Starship	"Nothing's Gonna Stop Us Now"	Arista	9 May 1987	4
591	Whitney Houston	"I Wanna Dance with Somebody (Who Loves Me)"	Arista	6 June 1987	2
592	The Firm	"Star Trekkin'"	Bark	20 June 1987	2
593	Pet Shop Boys	"It's a Sin"	Parlophone	4 July 1987	3
594	Madonna	"Who's That Girl"	Sire	25 July 1987	1
595	Los Lobos	"La Bamba"	Slash	1 August 1987	2
596	Michael Jackson and Siedah Garrett	"I Just Can't Stop Loving You"	Epic	15 August 1987	2
597	Rick Astley	"Never Gonna Give You Up" †	RCA	29 August 1987	5
598	MARRS	"Pump Up the Volume"	4AD	3 October 1987	2
599	Bee Gees	"You Win Again"	Warner Bros.	17 October 1987	4
600	T'Pau	"China in Your Hand"	Siren	14 November 1987	5
601	Pet Shop Boys	"Always on My Mind"	Parlophone	19 December 1987	4
1988
602	Belinda Carlisle	"Heaven Is a Place on Earth"	Virgin	16 January 1988	2
603	Tiffany	"I Think We're Alone Now"	MCA	30 January 1988	3
604	Kylie Minogue	"I Should Be So Lucky"	PWL	20 February 1988	5
605	Aswad	"Don't Turn Around"	CBS	26 March 1988	2
606	Pet Shop Boys	"Heart"	Parlophone	9 April 1988	3
607	S'Express	"Theme from S'Express"	Rhythm King	30 April 1988	2
608	Fairground Attraction	"Perfect"	RCA	14 May 1988	1
609	Wet Wet Wet / Billy Bragg and Cara Tivey	"With a Little Help from My Friends" / "She's Leaving Home"	Childline	21 May 1988	4
610	The Timelords	"Doctorin' the Tardis"	KLF Communications	18 June 1988	1
611	Bros	"I Owe You Nothing"	CBS	25 June 1988	2
612	Glenn Medeiros	"Nothing's Gonna Change My Love for You"	London	9 July 1988	4
613	Yazz and the Plastic Population	"The Only Way Is Up"	Big Life	6 August 1988	5
614	Phil Collins	"A Groovy Kind of Love"	Virgin	10 September 1988	2
615	The Hollies	"He Ain't Heavy, He's My Brother"	EMI	24 September 1988	2
616	U2	"Desire"	Island	8 October 1988	1
617	Whitney Houston	"One Moment in Time"	Arista	15 October 1988	2
618	Enya	"Orinoco Flow"	WEA	29 October 1988	3
619	Robin Beck	"First Time"	Mercury	19 November 1988	3
620	Cliff Richard	"Mistletoe and Wine" †	EMI	10 December 1988	4
1989
621	Kylie Minogue and Jason Donovan	"Especially for You"	PWL	7 January 1989	3
622	Marc Almond featuring Gene Pitney	"Something's Gotten Hold of My Heart"	EMI	28 January 1989	4
623	Simple Minds	"Belfast Child"	Virgin	25 February 1989	2
624	Jason Donovan	"Too Many Broken Hearts"	PWL	11 March 1989	2
625	Madonna	"Like a Prayer"	Sire	25 March 1989	3
626	The Bangles	"Eternal Flame"	CBS	15 April 1989	4
627	Kylie Minogue	"Hand on Your Heart"	PWL	13 May 1989	1
628	The Christians, Holly Johnson, Paul McCartney, Gerry Marsden and Stock Aitken Waterman	"Ferry 'Cross the Mersey"	PWL	20 May 1989	3
629	Jason Donovan	"Sealed with a Kiss"	PWL	10 June 1989	2
630	Soul II Soul	"Back to Life (However Do You Want Me)"	Virgin	24 June 1989	4
631	Sonia	"You'll Never Stop Me Loving You"	Chrysalis	22 July 1989	2
632	Jive Bunny and the Mastermixers	"Swing the Mood"	Music Factory Dance	5 August 1989	5
633	Black Box	"Ride on Time" †	Deconstruction	9 September 1989	6
634	Jive Bunny and the Mastermixers	"That's What I Like"	Music Factory Dance	21 October 1989	3
635	Lisa Stansfield	"All Around the World"	Arista	11 November 1989	2
636	New Kids on the Block	"You Got It (The Right Stuff)"	CBS	25 November 1989	3
637	Jive Bunny and the Mastermixers	"Let's Party"	Music Factory Dance	16 December 1989	1
638	Band Aid II	"Do They Know It's Christmas?"	PWL	23 December 1989	3

== By artist ==
American entertainer Madonna was the most successful act of the decade in terms of number-one singles. She had six number ones: "Into the Groove" (1985); "Papa Don't Preach", "True Blue" (both 1986); "La Isla Bonita", "Who's That Girl" (both 1987); and "Like a Prayer" (1989). George Michael had significant involvement with seven number-one singles; he was also involved with Band Aid single "Do They Know It's Christmas?" but his contribution was less significant. He had two number-one singles as a solo artist, four as a member of pop duo Wham!, and one as a duet with Aretha Franklin. The following artists achieved three or more number-one hits during the 1980s.

Artist	Number ones	Weeks at number one
Madonna	6	14
Pet Shop Boys	4	12
David Bowie	4	11
Shakin' Stevens	4	10
The Jam	4	9
Wham!	4	9
Frankie Goes to Hollywood	3	15
Jive Bunny and the Mastermixers	3	9
Kylie Minogue	3	9
The Police	3	9
Phil Collins	3	8
Paul McCartney	3	8
George Michael	3	8
Jason Donovan	3	7
John Lennon	3	7
Bucks Fizz	3	6
Whitney Houston	3	6
Blondie	3	5
Michael Jackson	3	5

Additionally, Adam Ant and Boy George each had one solo number one hit and two number one hits as lead singers of bands (Adam and the Ants and Culture Club, respectively) totalling three number one hits each.

== By record label ==
The following record labels had five or more number ones on the UK singles chart during the 1980s.

Record label	Number ones
Epic	23
CBS	19
Virgin	11
EMI	9
RCA	9
A&M	7
Chrysalis	7
PWL	7
Parlophone	6
Sire	6
Arista	5
Motown	5

== Songs with the most weeks at number one ==
The following songs spent at least five weeks at number one during the 1980s.

Artist	Song	Weeks at number one
Frankie Goes to Hollywood	"Two Tribes"	9
Culture Club	"Karma Chameleon"	6
Lionel Richie	"Hello"	6
Stevie Wonder	"I Just Called to Say I Love You"	6
Black Box	"Ride on Time"	6
Adam and the Ants	"Stand and Deliver"	5
The Human League	"Don't You Want Me"	5
Billy Joel	"Uptown Girl"	5
The Flying Pickets	"Only You"	5
Frankie Goes to Hollywood	"Relax"	5
Band Aid	"Do They Know It's Christmas?"	5
Paul Hardcastle	"19"	5
Jennifer Rush	"The Power of Love"	5
Rick Astley	"Never Gonna Give You Up"	5
T'Pau	"China in Your Hand"	5
Kylie Minogue	"I Should Be So Lucky"	5
Yazz and the Plastic Population	"The Only Way Is Up"	5
Jive Bunny and the Mastermixers	"Swing the Mood"	5

== Million-selling and platinum records ==
The British Phonographic Industry classified singles and albums since 1973 by the number of units sold, with the highest threshold being a "platinum record". Before 1989, a platinum record was given to singles that sold more than 1,000,000 units, a gold record for 500,000 unit sales and a silver record for 250,000. For singles released after 1 January 1989, the number of sales required to qualify for platinum, gold and silver records was dropped to 600,000 units (platinum), 400,000 units (gold) and 200,000 units (silver). Fifteen records were classified platinum in the 1980s. These include two songs from the 1970s that were classified platinum in the 1980s: Slade's "Merry Xmas Everybody", released in 1973, re-entered the charts and was classified platinum in 1980 and sold more than one million copies by 1985. Pink Floyd's 1979 release "Another Brick in the Wall (Part II)" was classified platinum at the beginning of 1980 and, although certified as selling 0.995 million units, is believed to have surpassed a million copies in the 1980s when sales not "over-the-counter" are included.

In the 1980s, twelve songs were released that were classified platinum in the decade; eleven of these also sold one million units in that time. The double A-side, "Last Christmas" / "Everything She Wants" by Wham!, is notable for being the only million-selling single of the decade not to reach number one due to Band Aid's "Do They Know It's Christmas?" being released at the same time. In addition, a new version of "Do They Know It's Christmas?" by Band Aid II was released in December 1989 and was classified platinum in 1990 and John Lennon's "Imagine" (originally released in 1975), reached number one in 1981 following his death and sold more than a million copies.

Twelve other songs originally released in the 1980s have since sold one million units, eleven of them following the introduction of music downloads in 2004. The other song released in the 1980s to sell a million copies is "Blue Monday" by New Order, which charted in several years during the decade, but was not listed as a million seller until later.

Artist	Song	Date released	Date certified platinum	Year of millionth sale
John Lennon	"Imagine"	1 October 1975	1 February 1981	1981
The Human League	"Don't You Want Me"	27 November 1981	1 January 1982	1981
Dexys Midnight Runners and the Emerald Express	"Come On Eileen"	1 June 1982	1 September 1982	1982
New Order	"Blue Monday" ^{[No. 3]}	7 March 1983	—	1983
Culture Club	"Karma Chameleon"	6 September 1983	1 October 1983	1983
Frankie Goes to Hollywood	"Relax"	1 January 1984	1 March 1984	1984
Frankie Goes to Hollywood	"Two Tribes"	May 1984	1 June 1984	1984
George Michael	"Careless Whisper"	23 July 1984	1 September 1984	1984
Stevie Wonder	"I Just Called to Say I Love You"	17 August 1984	1 September 1984	1984
Band Aid	"Do They Know It's Christmas?"	28 November 1984	1 December 1984	1984
Wham!	"Last Christmas" / "Everything She Wants"^{[No. 2]}	3 December 1984	1 January 1985	1984
Jennifer Rush	"The Power of Love"	28 May 1985	1 November 1985	1985
Jive Bunny and the Mastermixers	"Swing the Mood"	June 1989	1 August 1989	—
Black Box	"Ride On Time"	18 August 1989	1 October 1989	2004–10
Band Aid II	"Do They Know It's Christmas?"	11 December 1989	1 April 1990	—
Adam and the Ants	"Stand and Deliver"	1 May 1981	—	2004–10
Tight Fit	"The Lion Sleeps Tonight"	1 January 1982	—	2010–12
Irene Cara	"Fame"	1 June 1982	—	2004–10
Survivor	"Eye of the Tiger"	2 July 1982	—	2004–10
Billy Joel	"Uptown Girl"	30 September 1983	—	2004–12
Ray Parker, Jr.	"Ghostbusters"^{[No. 2]}	17 August 1984	—	2004–10
The Pogues featuring Kirsty MacColl	"Fairytale of New York"^{[No. 2]}	23 November 1987	—	2011
UB40	"Red Red Wine"	20 August 1983	—	2014
Journey	"Don't Stop Believin'"^{[No. 62]}	1 December 1981	—	2014
Kylie Minogue & Jason Donovan	"Especially for You"	28 November 1988	—	2014

== Additional information ==
^{[No. 2]}: The singles "Ghostbusters" and "Fairytale of New York" peaked at number two in the UK singles chart. "Last Christmas" peaked at number two upon its original release, but eventually reached number one in 2021.

^{[No. 3]}: "Blue Monday" was originally released as a 12" single in 1983, where it peaked at number 9 in the UK singles chart. It was re-released in 7" format in 1988 as "Blue Monday 1988" where it reached a higher peak of number 3. It has also been re-released on other occasions, most notably 1995. New Order's label, Factory Records, were not a member of the British Phonographic Industry (BPI) so they never received any sales certifications. However, "Blue Monday" sold more than one million units through combined sales total.

^{[No. 62]}: "Don't Stop Believin'" originally peaked in the UK at number 62 in 1982, but reached number 6 in 2010 following performances on The X Factor.
