= Sweet Soul Music (disambiguation) =

"Sweet Soul Music" is a soul song, first released by Arthur Conley in 1967.

Sweet Soul Music may also refer to:

- Sweet Soul Music (Aaradhna album), 2008
- Sweet Soul Music (London Boys album), 1991
  - "Sweet Soul Music" (London Boys song), the title track
