= Harlem Desire =

Single by London Boys

from the album The Twelve Commandments of Dance
- B-side: "Talk! Talk! Talk!"
- Released: 1987; September 1989
- Genre: Europop, Euro disco
- Length: 3:41
- Label: WEA, TELDEC
- Songwriter: Ralf René Maué
- Producer: Ralf René Maué

London Boys singles chronology
"London Nights" (1989)	"Harlem Desire" (1987)	"My Love" (1989)

Alternative Cover
- 1987 cover of "Harlem Desire".

"Harlem Desire" is a single by Europop duo London Boys. It was originally released in 1987 to limited success. As a result of the success of "Requiem" and "London Nights", the single was released again in 1989 and featured on the album The Twelve Commandments of Dance. It was written and produced by Ralf René Maué, and its cover artwork features photography from Julian Barton. The single peaked at number 17 in the UK.

The B-side "Talk! Talk! Talk!" is a distant reworking of the track "Dance Dance Dance" which also appeared on The Twelve Commandments of Dance and was released as a 1987 single. The original 1987 release featured the track "Put a Meaning in my Life" which was written by Django Seelenmeyer and Ralf René Maué.

== Critical reception ==
A review in Pan-European magazine Music & Media said about "Harlem Desire": "The London Boys are the Boney M of the late 80s. Bombastic Europop with a sledgehammer dance beat". More critical, David Giles, reviewer of Music Week, presented the song as a "camp, throwaway Euro-disco/Hi-NRG" similar to the band's previous single, and added that its chances to get success would depend on the music video and its reception in clubs. Retrospectively, in a 2015 review of the parent album, the Pop Rescue website considered "Harlem Desire" is "a quite dancey", "wonderfully catchy and singalong" song, with "some great vocal harmonies" and "lots of stabbing synths scattered throughout", and a music recalling Pet Shop Boys.

== Chart performance ==
"Harlem Desire" met with some success, but not as much as London Boys' previous two singles, "Requiem" and "London Nights", failing to reach the top ten in their home-country. In the UK, it started at number 37 on 16 August 1989, reached number 17 two weeks later, and remained on the chart for seven weeks. In Ireland, it reached number six in September 1989 and appeared on the chart for four weeks. In addition, it was a top 20 hit in Finland, and charted for four weeks on the overall Eurochart Hot 100, with a peak at number 55 in its second week.

== Formats ==
=== 1987 release ===
- 7" Single
1. "Harlem Desire" - 3:45
2. "Put a Meaning in My Life" - 3:40
- 12" Single
1. "Harlem Desire (Extended Mix)" - 8:18
2. "Put a Meaning in My Life" - 3:40

=== 1989 release ===
- 7" Single
1. "Harlem Desire" - 3:41
2. "Talk! Talk! Talk!" - 3:20
- 12" Single
1. "Harlem Desire (Extended Mix)" - 8:21
2. "Talk! Talk! Talk!" - 3:20
- CD Single
1. "Harlem Desire" - 3:44
2. "Talk! Talk! Talk!" - 3:20
3. "Harlem Desire (Extended Mix)" - 8:20
4. "Kimbaley (My Ma-Mama Say)" - 4:14

== Personnel ==
- Edem Ephraim - vocals
- Dennis Fuller - choreographer, backing vocals
- Ralf René Maué - writer, producer

== Charts ==
Weekly chart performance for "Harlem Desire"
Chart (1989)	Peak position
Europe (European Hot 100)	55
Finland (Suomen virallinen lista)	20
Ireland (IRMA)	6
Luxembourg (Radio Luxembourg)	15
UK Singles (Official Charts)	17
UK Dance (Music Week)	28
