= Let's Party =

Let's Party can refer to:

- "Let's Party" (song), a 1989 song by Jive Bunny
- "Let's Party!", a song by Per Gessle, seen on the 2008 re-release of his The World According to Gessle album
- "Let's Party!" (song) a 1990 song by Sha-Boom (Norwegian Rock Band). written by Per Gessle
- "Let's Party!", a 1990 song by Sha-Boom (Norwegian Rock Group),
