= Freedom (London Boys song) =

Single by London Boys

from the album Sweet Soul Music
- Released: 7 January 1991
- Genre: Europop; Eurodisco
- Length: 3:54
- Label: TELDEC; EastWest
- Songwriter: Ralf René Maué
- Producer: Ralf René Maué

London Boys singles chronology
"Chapel of Love" (1990)	"Freedom" (1991)	"Sweet Soul Music" (1991)

"Freedom" is a song by German-based British dance-pop duo London Boys, released in January 1991 by TELDEC and EastWest Records as the second single from their second studio album, Sweet Soul Music (1991). The song was written and produced by Ralf René Maué. In the UK, it peaked at number 54, better than the previous single "Chapel of Love" which reached at number 75.

== Formats ==
- 7" single
1. "Freedom" - 3:54
2. "Freedom (Instrumental)" - 3:53
- 12" single
1. "Freedom (Eight-O-Eight Mix)" - 8:08
2. "Freedom (Radio Version)" - 3:54
3. "Freedom (Instrumental)" - 3:53
- CD single
1. "Freedom (Radio Version)" - 3:54
2. "Freedom (Eight-O-Eight Mix)" - 8:08
3. "Freedom (Instrumental)" - 3:53

== Charts ==
Chart (1991)	Peak position
Finland (Suomen virallinen lista)	6
Switzerland (Schweizer Hitparade)	29
UK Singles (OCC)	54
UK Airplay (Music Week)	49

== Personnel ==
- Edem Ephraim: Vocals
- Dennis Fuller: Choreographer, backing vocals
- Ralf René Maué: Writer, producer
