= Love 4 Unity =

Studio album by London Boys
- Released: 1993
- Genre: Dance
- Label: EastWest
- Producer: Ralf René Maué

London Boys chronology
Sweet Soul Music (1991)	Love 4 Unity (1993)	Hallelujah Hits (1995)

Love 4 Unity is the third studio album by British dance-pop duo the London Boys, released in 1993. Both "Moonraker" and "Baby Come Back" were released as singles in Germany. "Baby Come Back" peaked at No. 27 in Austria.

This was the last album from the duo, although Hallelujah Hits would be released under the name the New London Boys. The album was not successful and the two singles also failed to chart in Germany.

Like previous albums, songwriting and production were by Ralf René Maué.

== Track listing ==
All tracks written by Ralf René Maué except track one written by Eddy Grant.

1. "Baby Come Back" (3:43)
2. "I Have a Dream" (4:12)
3. "Philadelphia '69" (3:56)
4. "Knock, Knock, Knock" (3:42)
5. "Moonraker" (3:53)
6. "Oh, Tracy" (3:57)
7. "We're Calling the World" (4:11)
8. "Dreams of Glory" (3:44)
9. "Walk On By" (4:01)
10. "My Prayer" (4:15)
11. "A Beautiful View of the Earth" (Deep-Affinity remix) (7:04)
