= Hallelujah Hits =

Studio album by New London Boys
- Released: 1995
- Genre: Dance
- Label: Polydor
- Producer: Ralf René Maué

New London Boys chronology
Love 4 Unity (1993)	Hallelujah Hits (1995)

Hallelujah Hits is the fourth and final album by the London Boys although it was titled to the New London Boys. It was released in 1995. The album consists of the traditional religious anthems in Eurodance arrangements.

Both 'Gospel Train To London' and 'Kumbaya' were released as singles in Germany. 'Gospel Train To London' had a promotional video created for the single which would be the last video to feature the duo. Both members Edem Ephraim and Dennis Fuller died in a car crash in January 1996.

== Track listing ==
All tracks written by Ralf René Maué and traditional.

1. "Gospel Train to London" (3:54)
2. "Kumbaya" (4:21)
3. "Lay Down Your Body" (4:04)
4. "Wade in the Water" (4:18)
5. "Hallelujah Hits Pt. II" (3:47)
6. "Go Down Moses" (4:24)
7. "Joshua Fit the Battle of Jericho" (3:42)
8. "Swing Low Sweet Chariot" (4:04)
9. "Rock My Soul" (4:23)
10. "Go Tell It on the Mountain" (4:10)
