= Chapel of Love (London Boys song) =

Single by London Boys

from the album Sweet Soul Music
- B-side: "Chapel Of Love (Instrumental)"
- Released: 1990
- Genre: Europop, Euro disco
- Length: 3:39
- Label: TELDEC, EastWest
- Songwriter(s): Ralf René Maué
- Producer(s): Ralf René Maué

London Boys singles chronology
"My Love '89" (1989)	"Chapel of Love" (1990)	"Freedom" (1991)

"Chapel of Love" is Europop duo London Boys' first single of 1990 from the album Sweet Soul Music. The single was written and produced by Ralf René Maué, and peaked at #75 in the UK. The single wasn't available on 7" vinyl in the UK but on 12" and CD instead. 7" versions were released in Germany.

The single version replaces the album version's backing lyrics of "forever and a day" with "crying".

== Critical reception ==
On its release, Smash Hits, wrote "The rubber men in the ill-advised vests return to form with a mental Euro-stunner of 'London Nights' hilarity; preposterous classical bit at the beginning, thumping chorus about crying in the chapel (enough to make Duke Elvis Priestly do cartwheels in his grave), bells bonging, cymbals freaking out completely, deep-throated huskings in the background a-plenty - not one with-it house beat happening flare in sight. Quite right, too. Their resolute unfashionableness is their genius for they are, after all, the new ABBA. All hail the Kings of Chronic!" Ben Thompson of New Musical Express stated, "Producer Ralf Rene Maul is one of the last great unsung heroes of popular music - he is George 'Shadow' Morton to SAW's Phil Spector. The London Boys' extraordinary symphonic productions - church bells, chime bars, the kitchen sink - are amongst the most extreme and deranged records you could ever wish to hear, and this one is no exception."

== Formats ==
7" Single

1. "Chapel of Love" - 4:22
2. "Chapel of Love (Instrumental)" - 4:00

12" Single

1. "Chapel Of Love (Hot Mix # 1)" - 7:45
2. "Chapel Of Love (Hot Mix # 2)" - 6:18
3. "Chapel Of Love (7" Version)" - 3:39

12" Remix Single

1. "Chapel Of Love (Hot Mix #3)" - 9:27
2. "Chapel Of Love (7" Version)" - 3:39

CD Single #1

1. "Chapel Of Love (7" Version)" - 3:3
2. "Chapel Of Love (Hot Mix # 2)" - 6:18
3. "Chapel Of Love (Hot Mix # 1)" - 7:45

CD Single #2

1. "Chapel Of Love (Honeymoon Mix)" - 7:31
2. "Chapel Of Love (Monastery Mix)" - 9:27
3. "Chapel Of Love (Radio Mix)" - 3:58

== Charts ==
Chart (1990)	Peak position
Finland (Suomen virallinen lista)	4
UK Singles Chart	75

== Personnel ==
- Edem Ephraim: Vocals
- Dennis Fuller: Choreographer, backing vocals
- Ralf René Maué: Writer, producer, remixer of "Hot Mix # 1"
- Nigel Wright: Remixer of "Hot Mix # 2"
