= London Boys =

British/German musical duo

- Origin: United Kingdom; Hamburg, West Germany
- Genres: Dance; Eurobeat; dance-pop; hi-NRG; Eurodisco
- Years active: 1986–1996, 2024–present
- Labels: Teldec, Atlantic, WEA, Polydor, Rhino
- Spinoffs: New London Boys
- Members: Gaspar Garcia; ET Benson
- Past members: Edem Ephraim; Dennis Fuller

London Boys were a British dance-pop duo based in Germany whose members were Edem Ephraim (1 July 1959, London, UK – 21 January 1996) and Dennis Fuller (19 June 1959, Jamaica – 21 January 1996). They are best remembered for the UK top 5 hits "Requiem" and "London Nights". The duo were killed when their car was hit by a drunk driver in the Eastern Alps, Austria, on 21 January 1996. Ephraim's wife also died in the accident, leaving their three-year-old son orphaned and Fuller's 10-year-old daughter without a father.

In 2024 the original producers, Ralf-René Maué and Luis Rodríguez Salazar, recruited two new members for the group, Gaspar Garcia and ET Benson. Maué was the composer and lyricist of all the original London Boys hits in the late 1980s and early 1990s, while Rodríguez is especially known of having co-produced the most popular Eurodisco projects of German music producer and composer Dieter Bohlen, for example Modern Talking or C.C.Catch. He was also behind German Eurodance act of the mid-1990s Fun Factory. Maué and Rodríguez both worked in Hamburg in the 1980s, and the latter has his own studio in Mallorca Spain called Team 33. His wife Lian Ross (Josephine Hiebel) is also a well-known performer of the Eurodisco/hi-NRG music scene.

== Musical career ==
Although Dennis Fuller and Edem Ephraim, the original members of London Boys had lived near Hamburg, West Germany, since 1981, the pair had actually met when they were at school in Greenwich, London, Ephraim having been born in London and Fuller in Jamaica. They were formed in 1986 as a vehicle for songwriter and record producer Ralf-René Maué. They signed with Teldec. Their musical style was a mix of soul and dance music or Eurobeat dance music. Spinning on their heads was combined with choreography, acquired during their experience as rollerblade dancers prior to forming the duo. Dennis Fuller was a former member of the Roxy Roller rollerskating disco act, which released a single called "I Need a Holiday" in May 1979.

The duo's most notable songs were "London Nights" and "Requiem", which were initially released in 1988. "Requiem" eventually became their breakthrough single in April 1989, reaching No. 4 on the UK Singles Chart. Subsequently, the re-released "London Nights" and the album The Twelve Commandments of Dance, both peaked at No. 2 on the UK singles and album charts, respectively. Another single, "Harlem Desire", reached No. 17. A fourth single from the album, a remixed version of their 1987 release "My Love", reached No. 46. After that, their last two UK Singles Chart entries were with "Chapel of Love" (#75) in 1990 and "Freedom" (#54) in 1991. The music videos for their singles were largely based around dance sequences and relationship/love storylines.

After this, their later recordings had little commercial success, with no further UK chart entries. However, in total, the London Boys sold 4.5 million records worldwide.

After being dropped by their record label, the band effectively split up. In 1995, shortly before their deaths, a reformed version of the group, through Polydor, made a crossover album called Hallelujah Hits, which incorporated Eurodance arrangements into traditional religious compositions.

== Death ==
Ephraim, Fuller and Ephraim's wife died in a car crash on 21 January 1996. They were travelling in the Austrian Alps on a mountain road on their way to a skiing holiday and along the route met a car driven by a drunk driver who was trying to pass on the opposite side of the road. The Swiss driver had reportedly been overtaking other cars in dangerous places along the road for a couple of miles beforehand in bad weather, and he hit their car head-on. Fuller, Ephraim, Ephraim's German wife Bettina, a Hamburg DJ (who was their mutual friend) and the Swiss driver died in the accident. Ephraim and his wife left a son, Stevie, who was 3-years-old. Fuller had a daughter, Laura, who was ten.

== (New) London Boys ==
In June 2024, the Instagram account @LondonBoys_Official was launched. It was accompanied by a message from the original producers, Ralf-René Maué and Luis Rodriguez, stating, "They will remain irreplaceable forever... but the music and their legacy... are meant to stay alive." The new performers are Gaspar Garcia and E.T Benson.

On 4 October 2024, a new single, "Satellite of Love" written by Maué and produced by Rodriguez, was released on streaming platforms. On 26 September 2025, the second new single, "Let's Build the World", also written by Maué and produced by Rodriguez, was released.

== Discography ==
=== Albums ===
Year	Album	Peak chart positions			Certifications
Year	Album	UK	AUS	AUT	Certifications
1989	The Twelve Commandments of Dance	2	137	―	BPI: Platinum
1991	Sweet Soul Music	―	―	22	
1993	Love 4 Unity	―	―	―	
1995	Hallelujah Hits (credited as "New London Boys")	―	―	―	
"—" denotes releases that did not chart or were not released.

=== Singles ===
Year	Title	Peak positions							Certifications	Album
Year	Title	UK	AUS	IRE	BEL (FL)	GER	AUT	SWI	Certifications	Album
1986	"I'm Gonna Give My Heart"	—	—	—	—	—	—	—		The Twelve Commandments of Dance
1987	"Harlem Desire"	—	—	—	—	—	—	—		The Twelve Commandments of Dance
1987	"Dance Dance Dance"	—	—	—	—	—	—	—		The Twelve Commandments of Dance
1987	"My Love"	—	—	—	—	—	—	—		The Twelve Commandments of Dance
1987	"Supermix" (Finland only)	—	—	—	—	—	—	—		Non-album single
1988	"Requiem"	4	149	8	36	27	11	—	BPI: Silver	The Twelve Commandments of Dance (second edition)
1989	"London Nights"	2	165	4	—	24	—	9	BPI: Silver	The Twelve Commandments of Dance (second edition)
1989	"Harlem Desire '89"	17	—	6	—	—	—	—		The Twelve Commandments of Dance (second edition)
1989	"My Love '89"	46	—	15	—	—	—	—		The Twelve Commandments of Dance (second edition)
1989	"Megamix" (UK only)	—	—	—	—	—	—	—		Non-album single
1990	"Chapel of Love"	75	—	—	—	—	—	—		Sweet Soul Music
1990	"Freedom"	54	—	—	—	—	—	29		Sweet Soul Music
1991	"Sweet Soul Music" (Soul Kitchen featuring London Boys)	109	152	—	—	81	11	—		Sweet Soul Music
1991	"Is This Love?"	—	—	—	—	—	—	—		Sweet Soul Music
1991	"Tonight! Tonight!"	—	—	—	—	—	—	—		Sweet Soul Music
1992	"Moonraker"	—	—	—	—	—	—	—		Love 4 Unity
1993	"Baby Come Back"	95	—	—	—	—	27	—		Love 4 Unity
1995	"Gospeltrain to London"	—	—	—	—	—	—	—		Hallelujah Hits
1995	"Kumbaya"	—	—	—	—	—	—	—		Hallelujah Hits
2024	"Satellite of Love"	—	—	—	—	—	—	—		Non-album singles
2025	"Let's Build a World"	—	—	—	—	—	—	—		Non-album singles
"—" denotes releases that did not chart or were not released.
