= My Love (London Boys song) =

Single by London Boys

from the album The Twelve Commandments of Dance
- B-side: "Heartache"
- Released: 1987 (German release); 20 November 1989 (re-issue) (UK)
- Genre: Europop, Euro disco
- Length: 3:03
- Label: Ultraphone, WEA, TELDEC
- Songwriter: Ralf René Maué
- Producer: Ralf René Maué

London Boys singles chronology
"Megamix" (1989)	"My Love" (1987)	"Chapel of Love" (1990)

"My Love" is a song by Europop duo London Boys, originally released in 1987 as a single in Germany. It was given another single release in the UK and Germany in 1989, following the song's inclusion on the duo's 1988 debut album The Twelve Commandments of Dance. "My Love" was written and produced by Ralf René Maué. The song reached number 46 in the UK, but was a bigger success in Ireland where it reached number 15.

== Critical reception ==
According to James Masterton, "My Love" was a better song than "Harlem Desire", the duo's previous single. Retrospectively, in a 2015 review of the parent album, the Pop Rescue website considered "My Love" "a great little dance track", adding that "it's fairly simple, but catchy", showing a great "vocal harmony".

== Track listings ==
=== 1987 ===
- 7" single
1. "My Love" – 3:05
2. "My Love" (instrumental) – 3:13
- 12" single
1. "My Love" (extended mix) – 7:52
2. "My Love" (instrumental) – 3:13

=== 1989 ===
- 7" single / 7" picture disc
1. "My Love" – 3:03
2. "Heartache" – 3:43
- 12" single
1. "My Love" (remix) – 3:03
2. "Heartache" – 3:43
3. "My Love" (extended remix) – 7:15
- CD single
1. "My Love" (extended remix) – 7:15
2. "Heartache" – 3:43
3. "My Love" (remix) – 3:03

== Personnel ==
- Edem Ephraim – vocals
- Dennis Fuller – choreographer, backing vocals
- Ralf René Maué – producer
- Dave Ford – remixes

== Charts ==
Weekly chart performance for "My Love"
Chart (1989)	Peak position
Finland (Suomen virallinen lista)	15
Ireland (IRMA)	15
UK (OCC)	46
