= The Twelve Commandments of Dance =

Studio album by London Boys
- Released: 17 July 1989
- Genre: Dance
- Label: Atlantic; WEA; Ultraphone
- Producer: Ralf René Maué

London Boys chronology
The Twelve Commandments of Dance (1989)	Sweet Soul Music (1991)

Singles from The Twelve Commandments of Dance
- 1. "I'm Gonna Give My Heart" Released: 1986; 2. "Harlem Desire" Released: 1987; 3. "Dance Dance Dance" Released: 1987; 4. "My Love" Released: 1987; 5. "Requiem" Released: 1988; 6. "London Nights" Released: 1989

The Twelve Commandments of Dance is the debut album by Germany-based English dance-pop duo London Boys, released in 1989. It reached number 2 in the UK Albums Chart and stayed on the chart for 29 weeks.

Other than the charting singles stated in the track listing, two other singles were released: "I'm Gonna Give My Heart" and "Dance Dance Dance".

== Critical reception ==
A review published in Music Week presented the album as a "perfect, pimple-free, faceless pop music that attempts to be soulful but lacks any kind of charisma", reproached the fact that all the tracks "repeat the [same] formula ad nauseum", and concluded that "the album is a danger to youngsters everywhere". Johnny Dee of Record Mirror stated that lyrically, the album is "all utter cack", but considered that the more important thing lies in the fact that every track "has a 132 bpm sequencer chugging away" and "a chorus so catchy" that listeners could not forget it and could perform "stupid dances" on it.

Retrospectively, in a 2015 review, the Pop Rescue website gave the album four stars out of five, presented it as containing "wonderful early commercial dance/europop and light tracks" with elements from both disco and dance music and features recalling Pet Shop Boys, added "it is up-beat throughout and mostly up-lifting and cheerful", but considered "Wichitah Woman" and "El Matinero" as the weakest tracks.

== Track listing ==
All tracks written by Ralf René Maué.

1. "Requiem" – 4:19 (UK No. 4)
2. "Kimbaley (My Ma-Mama Say)" – 4:17
3. "Harlem Desire" – 3:48 (UK No. 17)
4. "Chinese Radio" – 3:49
5. "Wichitah Woman" – 3:58
6. "My Love" – 3:05 (UK No. 46)
7. "London Nights" – 4:02 (UK No. 2)
8. "I'm Gonna Give My Heart" – 4:08
9. "El Matinero" – 4:14
10. "Dance Dance Dance" – 3:56
11. "Sandra" – 4:51
12. "The Midi Dance" – 3:14
- The 2009 remastered reissue released by Cherry Pop Records features extended remixes of tracks 1, 3, 6 and 7

== Chart and certifications ==
=== Charts ===
Chart (1989)	Peak position
Australian Albums (ARIA)	137
Europe (European Top 100 Albums)	15
Finland (Suomen virallinen lista)	4
UK Albums Chart	2

=== Certifications ===
Certifications for The Twelve Commandments Of Dance
Region	Certification	Certified units/sales
Finland (Musiikkituottajat)	Gold	
United Kingdom (BPI)	Platinum	300,000^{^}
^{^} Shipments figures based on certification alone.
