= Sweet Soul Music (London Boys album) =

Studio album by London Boys
- Released: 1991
- Genre: Dance
- Label: WEA, EastWest
- Producer: Ralf René Maué

London Boys chronology
The Twelve Commandments Of Dance (1989)	Sweet Soul Music (1991)	Love 4 Unity (1993)

Sweet Soul Music is the second studio album by the London Boys, a British dance pop duo. It was released in 1991 and reached number 22 in Austria. It did not chart in the UK, unlike the previous album The Twelve Commandments Of Dance. Five singles were released from this album: "Chapel of Love", "Freedom", "Is This Love?", "Sweet Soul Music", and "Tonight! Tonight!"

"Freedom" peaked at #29 in Switzerland. The single "Sweet Soul Music" peaked at #11 in Austria.

== Track listing ==
All tracks written by Ralf René Maué.

1. "Sweet Soul Music" (3:32)
2. "Tonight! Tonight!" (3:54)
3. "Freedom" (3:58)
4. "Is This Love?" (4:30)
5. "Bob Marley" (4:27)
6. "Was?! (Just an Illusion)" (4:33)
7. "Love Train" (3:52)
8. "High Fidelity" (3:57)
9. "Chapel of Love" (3:37)
10. "Cherokee" (3:46)
11. "Reggae-Reggae, Rasta-Rasta" (Reprise Bob Marley) (2:49)

== Chart performance ==
Chart (1991)	Peak position
Austrian Albums Chart	22
Finland (Suomen virallinen lista)	7
Hungarian Albums (MAHASZ)	29
