= Jive Bunny: The Album =

Studio album by Jive Bunny and the Mastermixers
- Released: 1989
- Recorded: 1989
- Genre: Electronic; rock
- Length: 44:29
- Label: Telstar
- Producer: Les Hemstock & Andy Pickles

Jive Bunny and the Mastermixers chronology
Jive Bunny: The Album (1989)	It's Party Time (1990)

Professional ratings
Review scores
Source	Rating
AllMusic	1.5/5 stars
The Rolling Stone Album Guide	.5/5 stars
The Vancouver Sun	1/5 stars
"The Village Voice"	D

Jive Bunny: The Album is the debut album by Jive Bunny and the Mastermixers, released in 1989 by Telstar Records and produced by Les Hemstock and Andy Pickles. It includes two UK number one singles: "Swing the Mood" and "That's What I Like". Each of the album's tracks is made up of a medley of songs and samples from the 1940s to the 1970s.

The album peaked at number two on the UK Albums Chart and was the Christmas number two album that year.

== Track listing ==
1. "Swing the Mood" – 6:14
2. "Rock and Roll Party Mix" – 3:52
3. "Lover's Mix" – 5:44
4. "Do You Wanna Rock" – 6:08
5. "That's What I Like" – 5:30
6. "Glenn Miller Medley" – 3:54
7. "Swing Sisters Swing" – 6:16
8. "Hopping Mad" – 5:56

== Sampled songs ==
- Track 1: "In the Mood", "Pennsylvania 6-5000", "Little Brown Jug", "Let's Twist Again", "Rock Around the Clock", "Rock-A-Beatin' Boogie", "Tutti Frutti", "Wake Up Little Susie", "C'mon Everybody", "Hound Dog", "Shake, Rattle and Roll", "All Shook Up", "Jailhouse Rock", "At the Hop".
- Track 2: "Tutti Frutti", "Roll Over Beethoven", "Ooh! My Soul", "Keep A-Knockin'". Chubby Checker samples: "Tutti Frutti", "Shout! Shout! (Knock Yourself Out)".
- Track 3: "All I Have to Do Is Dream", "Silence Is Golden", "Rhythm of the Rain", "Will You Still Love Me Tomorrow", "Diana".
- Track 4: "Do You Wanna Dance", "Do You Wanna Touch Me", "Get It On", "Teenage Rampage". Samples: "Hot Love", "Devil Gate Drive", "I'm the Leader of the Gang".
- Track 5: "Hawaii 5-0", "Let's Twist Again", "Let's Dance", "Wipe Out", "Great Balls of Fire", "Johnny B. Goode" riff, "Good Golly, Miss Molly", "The Twist", "Summertime Blues" riff, "Razzle Dazzle", "Runaround Sue", "Chantilly Lace".
- Track 6: "In the Mood", "Little Brown Jug", "American Patrol", "Pennsylvania 6-5000".
- Track 7: "Chattanooga Choo Choo", "Don't Sit Under the Apple Tree (with Anyone Else but Me)", "Hold Tight", "The Coffee Song", "Lullaby of Broadway", "Boogie Woogie Bugle Boy", "Chattanooga Choo Choo", "A String of Pearls", "Saint Louis Blues", "Chattanooga Choo Choo".
- Track 8: "Shout", "March of the Mods", "Da Doo Ron Ron", "Come Back My Love", "Runaway", "Poetry in Motion", "Lucille", "I'm into Something Good", "Help Me, Rhonda".

== Chart performance ==
=== Weekly charts ===
Weekly chart performance for Jive Bunny: The Album
Chart (1989–1990)	Peak position
Australian Albums (ARIA)	1
Austrian Albums (Ö3 Austria)	5
Canadian Albums (RPM)	5
Dutch Albums (Album Top 100)	16
French Albums (SNEP)	2
German Albums (Offizielle Top 100)	14
Italian Albums (FIMI)	22
New Zealand Albums (RMNZ)	9
Norwegian Albums (VG-lista)	3
Swedish Albums (Sverigetopplistan)	11
Swiss Albums (Schweizer Hitparade)	3
UK Albums (OCC)	2
US Billboard 200	26

=== Year-end charts ===
Year-end chart performance for Jive Bunny: The Album
Chart (1990)	Position
Italian Albums (FIMI)	104
Swiss Albums (Schweizer Hitparade)	40

== Certifications and sales ==
Certifications and sales for Jive Bunny: The Album
Region	Certification	Certified units/sales
Australia (ARIA)	2× Platinum	140,000^{^}
Brazil (Pro-Música Brasil)	Platinum	250,000^{*}
Canada (Music Canada)	3× Platinum	300,000^{^}
New Zealand (RMNZ)	Platinum	15,000^{^}
Switzerland (IFPI Switzerland)	Platinum	50,000^{^}
United Kingdom (BPI)	3× Platinum	900,000^{^}
United States (RIAA)	Gold	500,000^{^}
^{*} Sales figures based on certification alone.^{^} Shipments figures based on certification alone.
