= Come Back, My Love =

Song by Anton Rubinstein

"Noch'" (ночь, Night) is a song by Anton Rubinstein. It appeared in German as Die Nacht ("Des Tages letztes Glühen"), a song for 2 voices & piano, Op. 48/7.

The song became popular, with new English words by Sonny Miller as "Come Back My Love" (1941), in arrangement by Bernard Grün (sometimes mis-credited as "Green").

== Recordings ==
- Richard Tauber
- John McCormack (tenor)
- Elena Obraztsova

== See also ==
- "Come Back My Love" The Wrens (R&B band)
- "Come Back My Love" Brainstorm (EP)
- "Come back my love" Gerard Joling 1991
