= Sweet Soul Music (London Boys song) =

Single by London Boys

from the album Sweet Soul Music
- Released: 1991
- Genre: Europop, Euro disco
- Length: 3:54
- Label: TELDEC, EastWest
- Songwriter(s): Ralf René Maué
- Producer(s): Ralf René Maué

London Boys singles chronology
| "Freedom" (1991) | "Sweet Soul Music" (1991) | "Is This Love?" (1991) |

"Sweet Soul Music" is a single by the Europop duo London Boys, which also featured Soul Kitchen. The single was written and produced by Ralf René Maué, and was the first since the duo's rise to fame not to be released in the UK.

The single had a promotional music video created to support the track. This became the last promo video for the duo, although there was a video for 1995 single "Gospel Train to London", which was released under the name The New London Boys, despite being by the same duo.

== Formats ==
7" Single

1. "Sweet Soul Music" - 3:29
2. "Sweet Soul Music (Instrumental)" - 3:33

12" Single

1. "Sweet Soul Music (Soul Kitchen Mix)" - 7:15
2. "Sweet Soul Music (Radio Mix)" - 3:29
3. "Sweet Soul Music (Instrumental)" - 3:33

CD Single

1. "Sweet Soul Music (Soul Kitchen Mix)" - 7:15
2. "Sweet Soul Music (Radio Mix)" - 3:29
3. "Sweet Soul Music (Instrumental)" - 3:33

CD Single (Japan release)

1. "Sweet Soul Music (Soul Kitchen Mix)" - 7:21
2. "Sweet Soul Music (Radio Mix)" - 3:35
3. "Sweet Soul Music (Instrumental)" - 3:40
4. "Freedom (Radio Version)" - 3:59
5. "Freedom (Eight-O-Eight Mix)" - 8:11
6. "Freedom (Instrumental)" - 3:53

== Personnel ==
- Edem Ephraim: Vocals
- Dennis Fuller: Choreographer, backing vocals
- Ralf René Maué: Writer, producer
- Soul Kitchen: Instruments

== Charts ==
| Chart (1991) | Peak position |
|---|---|
| Australia (ARIA) | 152 |
| Austrian Singles Chart | 11 |
| Finland (Suomen virallinen lista) | 1 |
| UK Singles Chart (OCC) | 109 |
