= London Nights =

1989 single by London Boys

Single by London Boys

from the album The Twelve Commandments of Dance
- B-side: "London Days" (the instrumental)
- Released: 19 June 1989
- Genre: Disco
- Length: 4:00
- Label: WEA, TELDEC
- Songwriter: Ralf René Maué
- Producer: Ralf René Maué

London Boys singles chronology
"Requiem '89" (1989)	"London Nights" (1989)	"Harlem Desire '89" (1989)

"London Nights" is a song by British Europop duo London Boys, released in 1989 from their debut album, The Twelve Commandments of Dance. The single was written and produced by Ralf René Maué, and its cover artwork features photography from Andy Knight. It reached number one in Finland and became a top-five hit in Ireland and the United Kingdom. Several formats of the single include an instrumental version of "London Nights", titled "London Days".

== Lyrics and music ==
According to James Masterton, "London Nights" is similar to "Requiem", the duo's previous single, as it uses "the same formula of Gregorian chants, rap verses and uplifting choruses". Lyrically, it deals with parties and romance in London.

== Critical reception ==
A review in Pan-European magazine Music & Media said it found "shades of Boney M on this disco single. Basic but effective. After the big success in the UK, ready for the Continent". To Masterton, "Maue's wall of sound production gave the track a swagger which turned it into a true disco epic". Tim Nicholson of Record Mirror considered that the song marked London Boys' end of the game, as their performance "start[ed] to lose its impact". Retrospectively, in a 2015 review of the parent album, the Pop Rescue website considered that "the tempo, throbbing basseline, and the mixture of choral synth samples and dance beat really makes this song really catchy", adding that many features are reminiscent of Pet Shop Boys.

== Chart performance ==
"London Nights" entered the UK Singles Chart at number 19 on July 1st, 1989, then climb to number three where it stayed for another week, reached a peak of number two the next week, being blocked from the number one slot by Sonia's "You'll Never Stop Me Loving You", and remained on the chart for nine weeks. It received a silver disc. It also entered the top five in Ireland where it hit number four and totaled eight weeks on the chart. In the other European countries, it reached number one in Finland, number nine in Switzerland, and number 24 in Germany. On the Eurochart Hot 100, it started at number 63 on July 8th, 1989, jumped to number 11 the next week and peaked at number six in its fourth week, and fell of the chart after 13 weeks. Mainly aired on UK radios, it reached number 24 on the European Airplay Chart and appeared on the chart for six weeks.

== Track listings ==
- 7-inch single

A. "London Nights" – 4:00
B. "London Days" (the instrumental) – 3:56

- UK 12-inch single

A. "London Nights" – 8:22
B. "London Days" (the instrumental) – 3:56

- UK 12-inch remix single

A1. "London Nights" (London remix) – 7:33
B1. "London Nights" – 3:28
B2. "London Days" (the instrumental) – 3:56

- European mini maxi-CD single
1. "London Nights" (single version) – 4:00
2. "Requiem" (Continental remix) – 7:40
3. "London Nights" (12-inch version) – 8:10

== Charts ==
=== Weekly charts ===
Weekly chart performance for "London Nights"
Chart (1989)	Peak position
Australia (ARIA)	165
Europe (Eurochart Hot 100)	6
Europe (European Airplay Top 50)	24
Finland (Suomen virallinen lista)	1
Ireland (IRMA)	4
Luxembourg (Radio Luxembourg)	3
Switzerland (Schweizer Hitparade)	9
UK Singles (Official Charts)	2
UK Dance (Music Week)	4
West Germany (GfK)	24

=== Year-end charts ===
Year-end chart performance for "London Nights"
Chart (1989)	Position
UK Singles (OCC)	39

== Certifications ==
Certifications for "London Nights"
Region	Certification	Certified units/sales
United Kingdom (BPI)	Silver	200,000^{^}
^{^} Shipments figures based on certification alone.
