= Requiem (London Boys song) =

1988 single by London Boys

Single by London Boys

from the album The Twelve Commandments of Dance
- B-side: "The Midi Dance"
- Released: 28 November 1988
- Length: 4:22
- Label: WEA, TELDEC, Ultraphone
- Songwriter: Ralf René Maué
- Producer: Ralf René Maué

London Boys singles chronology
| "Supermix" (1987) | "Requiem" (1988) | "London Nights" (1989) |

"Requiem" is a song by British Europop duo London Boys, released on 28 November 1988 from their debut album, The Twelve Commandments of Dance (1989). The single was written and produced by Ralf René Maué. The single peaked at No. 4 in the United Kingdom, No. 8 in Ireland and No. 11 in Austria.

== Critical reception ==
According to James Masterton, "Requiem" is "the quintessential bubblegum Euro-hit, complete with bouncing bassline, a semi-rapped verse and the inevitable multi-tracked chorus". Retrospectively, in a 2015 review of the parent album, the Pop Rescue website considered "Requiem" "a wonderful dancey, uplifting song", with "catchy" verses composed of a "throbbing synth bass", the repeated sentence "Never gonna get enough" and spoken words, a feature recalling Pet Shop Boys.

== Track listings ==
- 7-inch single

A. "Requiem" (Hamburg Edit)
B. "The Midi Dance"

- UK 12-inch single

A1. "Requiem" (Hamburg Mix)
B1. "Requiem" (Hamburg Edit)
B2. "The Midi Dance"

- German mini-CD single 1
1. "Requiem" (Special UK-Mix) – 8:05
2. "My Love" – 3:05
3. "Dance Dance Dance" – 3:54
- German mini-CD single 2
1. "Requiem" (Hamburg Edit) – 4:12
2. "Requiem" (London Remix) – 8:04
3. "Requiem" (Hamburg Mix) – 7:34

== Charts ==
=== Weekly charts ===
Weekly chart performance for "Requiem"
| Chart (1988–1989) | Peak position |
|---|---|
| Australia (ARIA) | 149 |
| Austria (Ö3 Austria Top 40) | 11 |
| Belgium (Ultratop 50 Flanders) | 36 |
| Europe (Eurochart Hot 100) | 12 |
| Finland (Suomen virallinen lista) | 19 |
| Luxembourg (Radio Luxembourg) | 2 |
| Ireland (IRMA) | 8 |
| UK Singles (Official Charts) | 4 |
| UK Dance (Music Week) | 5 |
| West Germany (GfK) | 27 |

=== Year-end charts ===
Year-end chart performance for "Requiem"
| Chart (1989) | Position |
|---|---|
| Europe (Eurochart Hot 100) | 95 |
| UK Singles (OCC) | 27 |

== Certifications ==
Certifications for "Requiem"
| Region | Certification | Certified units/sales |
|---|---|---|
| United Kingdom (BPI) | Silver | 200,000^{^} |
^{^} Shipments figures based on certification alone.
