= Let's Party (Jive Bunny and the Mastermixers song) =

1989 single by Jive Bunny and the Mastermixers

Single by Jive Bunny and the Mastermixers
- B-side: "Auld Lang Syne"
- Released: 4 December 1989
- Genre: Electronic; rock
- Length: 4:25
- Label: Telstar
- Songwriter: Various
- Producers: Andy Pickles, Ian Morgan

Jive Bunny and the Mastermixers singles chronology
"That's What I Like" (1989)	"Let's Party" (1989)	"That Sounds Good to Me" (1990)

"Let's Party" is a song by British novelty pop music act Jive Bunny and the Mastermixers, the third single released by the father-and-son DJ team Andy and John Pickles. Released on 4 December 1989, it reached the top of the UK Singles Chart for a single week the same month. They became only the third act to reach No. 1 with their first three singles, following on from Gerry and the Pacemakers in 1964 and Frankie Goes to Hollywood in 1984, and took the shortest time to achieve the feat.

== Production and composition ==
The record follows on from the formula which took their earlier singles "Swing the Mood" and "That's What I Like" to number one on the charts. Although it did not appear on Jive Bunny: The Album, the track took its melodic hook from Joe Loss's "March of the Mods" - the same as the album's closing track "Hopping Mad". Unlike Jive Bunny's previous two hits, it did not reach the top of the international charts, although it reached number two in Ireland, Norway and Denmark, and charted in several other European nations.

The difference was it sampled classic Christmas songs instead. These included the Slade's 1973 number one hit "Merry Xmas Everybody" and Gary Glitter's "Another Rock and Roll Christmas". It also included Wizzard's "I Wish It Could Be Christmas Everyday" but, as they did not have permission to use the song, they got Wizzard's lead singer Roy Wood to re-record the song.

Following Gary Glitter's criminal convictions and public disgrace, later editions on download and streaming sites replaced his track with Mariah Carey's "All I Want For Christmas Is You"; Carey's song had already been included immediately before Glitter's on the 1996 Christmas Party album.

== Charts ==
=== Weekly charts ===
Chart (1989–1990)	Peak position
Austria (Ö3 Austria Top 40)	26
Belgium (Ultratop 50 Flanders)	13
Denmark (Tracklisten)	2
Europe (Eurochart Hot 100)	9
Finland (Suomen virallinen lista)	12
France (SNEP)	12
Ireland (IRMA)	2
Luxembourg (Radio Luxembourg)	1
Netherlands (Single Top 100)	70
Norway (VG-lista)	2
Sweden (Sverigetopplistan)	14
Switzerland (Schweizer Hitparade)	13
UK Singles (Official Charts)	1
West Germany (GfK)	80

=== Year-end charts ===
Chart (1989)	Position
UK Singles (OCC)	24

== Certifications and sales ==
Region	Certification	Certified units/sales
United Kingdom (BPI)	Gold	400,000^{^}
^{^} Shipments figures based on certification alone.
