= That's What I Like (Jive Bunny and the Mastermixers song) =

1989 single by Jive Bunny and the Mastermixers

Single by Jive Bunny and the Mastermixers

from the album The Album
- B-side: "Pretty Blue Eyes"
- Released: 2 October 1989
- Genre: Pop; rock and roll
- Length: 4:03 (radio version); 5:37 (extended version)
- Label: BCM; Indisc
- Songwriter: Various
- Producers: Andy Pickles; Ian Morgan

Jive Bunny and the Mastermixers singles chronology
"Swing the Mood" (1989)	"That's What I Like" (1989)	"Let's Party" (1989)

"That's What I Like" is a song by British novelty pop music act Jive Bunny and the Mastermixers, released on 2 October 1989 as the second single from their debut album, The Album (1989). It followed "Swing the Mood" to number one in the United Kingdom, Ireland and Spain and went top ten in several countries. In the United States, it failed to build on the success of the group's first hit, peaking at numbers 67 and 69 on the Cash Box Top 100 and Billboard Hot 100 charts.

== Background and structure ==
Father and son team Andy and John Pickles repeated the formula which had taken their record "Swing the Mood" to number one a few months previously. This time using "Hawaii Five-O" by the Ventures from the TV series Hawaii Five-O as the recurring melodic hook in the record. It was the act's second UK number-one hit and stayed at the top for three weeks in October 1989.

The mix includes the following songs:

- "Theme from Hawaii Five-O" by the Ventures
- "Let's Twist Again" by Chubby Checker
- "Let's Dance" by Chris Montez
- "Wipeout" by the Surfaris
- "Great Balls of Fire" by Jerry Lee Lewis
- "Johnny B. Goode" by Chuck Berry
- "Good Golly Miss Molly" by Little Richard
- "The Twist" by Chubby Checker
- "Summertime Blues" by Eddie Cochran
- "Razzle Dazzle" by Bill Haley and the Comets
- "Runaround Sue" by Dion
- "Chantilly Lace" by the Big Bopper

== Critical reception ==
Selina Webb from Music Week wrote, "Same formula, different faves, and still infuriatingly hitbound. An archive "C'mon everybody" kicks off snatches of the Hawaii 5-O theme tune plus geriatric hits from Chubby Checker, Little Richard and Bill Haley. Hands up if you wish you'd thought of it first."

== Track listings ==
- 7-inch single
1. "That's What I Like" – 4:03
2. "Pretty Blue Eyes" by John Anderson Band – 2:44
- 12-inch maxi
1. "That's What I Like" (extended twist mix) – 5:23
2. "Pretty Blue Eyes" by John Anderson Band – 2:44
3. "Twelve Bar Thingy" by John Anderson Band – 2:39
- CD maxi
1. "That's What I Like" – 4:03
2. "That's What I Like" (extended twist mix) – 5:23
3. "Pretty Blue Eyes" – 2:44
4. "Twelve Bar Thingy" by John Anderson Band – 2:39

== Personnel ==
- Artwork by Mick Hand
- Edited and engineered by Andy Pickles and Ian Morgan
- Executive producer : John Pickles
- Produced by Les Hemstock

== Charts ==
=== Weekly charts ===
Chart (1989–1990)	Peak position
Australia (ARIA)	4
Austria (Ö3 Austria Top 40)	5
Belgium (Ultratop 50 Flanders)	4
Belgium (Ultratop 50 Wallonia)	1
Denmark (Tracklisten)	2
Europe (Eurochart Hot 100)	3
Finland (Suomen virallinen lista)	2
France (SNEP)	2
Greece (IFPI)	1
Ireland (IRMA)	1
Luxembourg (Radio Luxembourg)	1
Netherlands (Dutch Top 40)	5
Netherlands (Single Top 100)	5
New Zealand (Recorded Music NZ)	17
Norway (VG-lista)	2
Spain (AFYVE)	1
Sweden (Sverigetopplistan)	5
Switzerland (Schweizer Hitparade)	4
UK Singles (Official Charts)	1
US Billboard Hot 100	69
US Cash Box Top 100	67
West Germany (GfK)	6

=== Year-end charts ===
Chart (1989)	Position
Belgium (Ultratop)	34
Europe (Eurochart Hot 100)	24
Netherlands (Single Top 100)	38
UK Singles (OCC)	7

Chart (1990)	Position
Europe (Eurochart Hot 100)	68
Germany (Media Control)	70

== Certifications and sales ==
Region	Certification	Certified units/sales
Australia (ARIA)	Platinum	70,000^{^}
France (SNEP)	Silver	200,000^{*}
United Kingdom (BPI)	Gold	400,000^{^}
^{*} Sales figures based on certification alone.^{^} Shipments figures based on certification alone.
