= Jive Bunny and the Mastermixers =

British novelty pop music act

- Origin: Rotherham, South Yorkshire, England
- Genres: Novelty, pop
- Years active: 1989–present
- Labels: BCM, Indisc
- Past members: Les Hemstock; John Pickles; Andrew Pickles; Patrick Perkins; Ian Morgan; Mark Smith; Joe Holden; John Anderson (producer/sampled)

Jive Bunny and the Mastermixers are a British novelty pop music act from Rotherham, South Yorkshire, England. The face of the group was Jive Bunny, a cartoon rabbit who appeared in their music videos. Costumed actors also made promotional appearances as the character.

Doncaster DJ and producer Les Hemstock created the original "Swing the Mood" mix for the Music Factory owned Mastermix DJ service. It was then taken from there and developed as a single release by father and son team John and Andrew Pickles. The name Jive Bunny was devised by Andy Pickles. Ian Morgan, a fellow DJ and co-producer, also engineered and mixed some of the early releases along with Andy Pickles. Morgan was replaced in the early 1990s by DJ and producer Mark "The Hitman" Smith.

Jive Bunny's three number ones during 1989 were "Swing the Mood", "That's What I Like" and "Let's Party". All three songs used sampling and synthesisers to combine pop music from the early rock 'n' roll era together into a medley.

== Musical career ==
The act had 11 entries in the UK singles chart between July 1989 and November 1991. Each track used a sampled instrumental theme to join the old songs together, in much the same way as dance music megamixes. "Swing the Mood" began with Glenn Miller's "In the Mood" (a recording from 1939), followed immediately by rhythmic re-editing of Bill Haley and His Comets' "Rock Around the Clock", Little Richard's "Tutti Frutti" and the Everly Brothers' "Wake Up, Little Susie". The recording also had a short extract from The Glenn Miller Story (1954) with James Stewart as Glenn Miller. "Swing the Mood" was No. 1 for five weeks on the UK Singles Chart in 1989, and quickly caught on in the United States, where it reached No. 11 on the Billboard Hot 100 chart.

"That's What I Like" featured the theme music from the television police drama Hawaii Five-O, with overlaid excerpts from rock hits like Chubby Checker's "Let's Twist Again" and Ernie Maresca's "Shout! Shout! (Knock Yourself Out)". "Let's Party" (released originally in the U.S. as "March of the Mods") used "March of the Mods" (also known as the Finnjenka Dance), interpolating Del Shannon's "Runaway" and The Wrens' "Come Back My Love" among others.

In the United Kingdom, "Let's Party" was a Christmas hit with samples of Wizzard's "I Wish It Could Be Christmas Everyday", Slade's "Merry Xmas Everybody" and Gary Glitter's "Another Rock 'N' Roll Christmas". Recently this has been remixed to remove the Gary Glitter track to avoid controversy over his subsequent criminal convictions and, somewhat anachronistically, replace it with Mariah Carey's "All I Want for Christmas Is You", should any radio stations wish to play it over the Christmas period. They did not have permission to use the original Wizzard recording so Roy Wood re-recorded that part of the track for them.

With "Let's Party" reaching Number One in the UK Singles Chart a couple of weeks before the Christmas chart of 1989, the act became the third group after Gerry and the Pacemakers and Frankie Goes to Hollywood to 'top the chart' with their first three releases. However, Jive Bunny was also credited on a Children In Need charity single ("It Takes Two, Baby", also featuring Liz Kershaw, Bruno Brookes and Londonbeat), which preceded "Let's Party" and did not top the charts. As of 2020, the Official Charts Company website does not include "It Takes Two, Baby" in its list of Jive Bunny releases, while many British Hit Singles books of the early 2000s added the record to their discography.

The original European medleys featured the original recordings by the original artists. Legalities prevented certain of the original recordings to be reused in America, so the American Jive Bunny releases substituted later re-recordings of the same tunes by Bill Haley, Del Shannon and others. Later reissues further replaced some of these artists, such as Bill Haley and Elvis, with impersonator-singers.

The original idea for the project came from Les Hemstock on the DJ-only Mastermix DJ service. The original "Swing the Mood" mix appeared on Issue 22 of Mastermix's monthly album release. John Pickles (father of Andy Pickles) was never in the band, but was the owner of the label and effectively the manager.

== Partial discography ==
=== Notable albums and compilations ===
List of albums, with selected chart positions and certifications
Title	Album details	Peak chart positions								Certifications
Title	Album details	UK	AUS	AUT	CAN	GER	NZ	SWI	US	Certifications
Jive Bunny: The Album	Released: February 1989; Label: Telstar Records; Formats: LP, cassette, CD	2	1	5	5	14	9	3	26	BPI: 3× Platinum; ARIA: 2× Platinum; MC: 3× Platinum; RIAA: Gold
It's Party Time	Released: 1990; Label: Telstar; Formats: LP, cassette, CD	23	12	26	—	—	50	14	—	BPI: Gold
Rock 'n' Roll Hall of Fame	Released: 1991; Label: Telstar; Formats: LP, cassette, CD	—	180	14	—	—	34	—	—	
The Best of Jive Bunny and the Mastermixers	Released: 1994; Label: Music Club; Formats: cassette, CD	—	—	—	—	88	—	44	—	
Christmas Party	Released: 1996; Label: Music Club; Formats: cassette, CD	—	—	—	—	—	—	—	—	BPI: Gold
Hop Around the Clock	Released: 1998; Label: Global Television; Formats: cassette, CD	76	—	—	—	—	—	—	—	
Ultimate Christmas Party	Released: 2002; Label: Music Club; Formats: cassette, CD	—	—	—	—	—	—	—	—	BPI: Gold

=== Charting singles ===
List of charting singles, with selected chart positions and certifications
Year	Single	Peak positions										Certifications	Album
Year	Single	UK	AUS	AUT	BEL (FL)	GER	NET	NZ	SWE	SWI	US	Certifications	Album
1989	"Swing the Mood"	1	1	1	1	1	1	1	2	2	11	BPI: Platinum; ARIA: Platinum; MC: Platinum; RIAA: Gold; RMNZ: Gold	Jive Bunny - The Album
1989	"That's What I Like"	1	4	5	4	6	5	17	5	4	69	BPI: Gold; ARIA: Platinum	Jive Bunny - The Album
1989	"Let's Party"	1	—	26	13	80	70	49	14	13	—	BPI: Gold	singles only
1990	"That Sounds Good to Me"	4	66	19	12	36	12	—	—	19	—		singles only
1990	"Can Can You Party"	8	—	27	28	—	51	—	—	13	—		It's Party Time
1990	"Let's Swing Again"	19	67	27	36	—	—	—	—	—	—		It's Party Time
1990	"The Crazy Party Mixes"	13	—	—	—	—	—	—	—	—	—		It's Party Time
1991	"Over to You John (Here We Go Again)"	28	—	—	43	—	—	—	—	—	—		It's Party Time
1991	"Hot Summer Salsa"	43	—	—	—	—	—	—	—	—	—		singles only
1991	"Rock 'n' Roll Dance Party"	48	—	—	24	—	68	—	—	—	—		singles only
1992	"Best of British"	75	—	—	47	—	—	—	—	—	—		singles only
1992	"Rock 'n' Roll Beethoven"	88	—	—	114	—	68	—	—	—	—		singles only
1992	"Lover's Mix"	127	—	—	100	—	68	—	—	—	—		singles only
1992	"The Official Jive Bunny Megamix"	80	—	—	76	—	68	—	—	—	—		singles only
"—" denotes releases that did not chart or were not released.

=== As featured artist ===
- "It Takes Two, Baby" by Liz Kershaw, Bruno Brookes, Jive Bunny and Londonbeat (number 53 on the UK Singles Chart, December 1989)

== See also ==
- Stars on 45, a Dutch novelty group of the early 1980s that used a similar format to Jive Bunny.
