= Swing the Mood =

1989 single by Jive Bunny and the Mastermixers

- Standard artwork

Single by Jive Bunny and the Mastermixers

from the album Jive Bunny: The Album
- B-side: "Glenn Miller Medley"
- Released: 26 June 1989
- Genre: Pop; rock and roll
- Length: 4:05 (radio version); 6:00 (extended version)
- Label: Carrere
- Songwriter: Jive Bunny
- Producers: Andy Pickles, Les Hemstock

Jive Bunny and the Mastermixers singles chronology
"Swing the Mood" (1989)	"That's What I Like" (1989)

Alternative cover
- Artwork used in Spain and German-speaking Europe

"Swing the Mood" is a song by British novelty pop music act Jive Bunny and the Mastermixers, released as the first single from their debut album, Jive Bunny: The Album (1989). Produced by the father and son DJ team of Andy and John Pickles, "Swing the Mood" is a cut and paste record which fused a number of early rock and roll records with liberal use of Glenn Miller's "In the Mood".

Copyright problems caused a re-recorded version to be released; despite this version being derided by critics, it became a hit in the United Kingdom, spending five weeks at number one on the UK Singles Chart in July and August 1989, partly aided by the Jive Bunny animated character. The record became a worldwide hit as well, topping the charts of 13 other countries and reaching number 11 on the US Billboard Hot 100. It was the second-best-selling single of 1989 in the UK.

== Samples ==
The single samples from the following songs:

- 0:00–0:04: Chubby Checker – "Let's Twist Again"
- 0:06–0:54: Glenn Miller – "In the Mood"
- 0:56–1:23: Bill Haley & His Comets – "Rock Around the Clock"
- 1:25–1:38: Bill Haley & His Comets – "Rock-A-Beatin' Boogie"
- 1:40–1:49: Little Richard – "Tutti Frutti"
- 1:51–2:17: The Everly Brothers – "Wake Up Little Susie"
- 2:19–2:26: Eddie Cochran – "C'mon Everybody"
- 2:28–2:42: Elvis Presley – "Hound Dog"
- 2:44–2:53: Bill Haley & His Comets – "Shake, Rattle and Roll"
- 2:55–3:03: Elvis Presley – "All Shook Up"
- 3:05–3:23: Elvis Presley – "Jailhouse Rock"
- 3:25–3:41: Danny and the Juniors – "At the Hop"
- 3:43–3:46: Little Richard – "Tutti Frutti"
- 3:48–6:05: Glenn Miller – "In the Mood", "Pennsylvania 6-5000", "Little Brown Jug", "American Patrol", "In the Mood"

The two-second intervals are for the material Jive Bunny was to have written himself, e. g., the mixing. Otherwise the record would have been regarded as a compilation single, attributable only to "Various Artists". The radio edit cuts much of Glenn Miller's songs, including the second round of the first playing of "In The Mood" at the beginning, and pretty much all of his other songs other than "In The Mood" at the end.

The initial release used original studio recordings by the original singers. A later reissue on CD replaced some of the recordings (such as those by Bill Haley) with later studio and live samples, with an impersonator singing the Elvis samples. Further reissues eliminated the original samples completely in favor of impersonator-singers.

== Track listings ==
- CD single
1. "Swing the Mood" (radio mix) – 4:05
2. "Glenn Miller Medley" (the J.B. edit) – 3:55
- CD maxi
1. "Swing the Mood" (12-inch version) – 6:00
2. "Swing the Mood" – 4:05
3. "Glenn Miller Medley" (the J.B. edit) – 3:55

== Charts ==
=== Weekly charts ===
Chart (1989–1990)	Peak position
Australia (ARIA)	1
Austria (Ö3 Austria Top 40)	1
Belgium (Ultratop 50 Flanders)	1
Canada Retail Singles (The Record)	1
Canada Top Singles (RPM)	16
Canada Adult Contemporary (RPM)	1
Canada Dance/Urban (RPM)	3
Denmark (IFPI)	1
Europe (Eurochart Hot 100)	1
Finland (Suomen virallinen lista)	1
France (SNEP)	1
Greece (IFPI)	3
Ireland (IRMA)	1
Italy Airplay (Music & Media)	10
Luxembourg (Radio Luxembourg)	1
Netherlands (Dutch Top 40)	1
Netherlands (Single Top 100)	1
New Zealand (Recorded Music NZ)	1
Norway (VG-lista)	1
Portugal (AFP)	2
Spain (AFYVE)	1
Sweden (Sverigetopplistan)	2
Switzerland (Schweizer Hitparade)	2
UK Singles (Official Charts)	1
US Billboard Hot 100	11
US 12-inch Singles Sales (Billboard)	7
West Germany (GfK)	1

=== Year-end charts ===
Chart (1989)	Position
Australia (ARIA)	16
Austria (Ö3 Austria Top 40)	8
Belgium (Ultratop)	2
Europe (Eurochart Hot 100)	3
Netherlands (Dutch Top 40)	28
Netherlands (Single Top 100)	17
New Zealand (RIANZ)	12
Switzerland (Schweizer Hitparade)	13
UK Singles (OCC)	2
West Germany (Media Control)	7

Chart (1990)	Position
Canada Adult Contemporary (RPM)	92
US Billboard Hot 100	97

== Certifications ==
Region	Certification	Certified units/sales
Australia (ARIA)	Platinum	70,000^{^}
Canada (Music Canada)	Platinum	100,000^{^}
France (SNEP)	Gold	400,000^{*}
New Zealand (RMNZ)	Gold	5,000^{*}
United Kingdom (BPI)	Platinum	600,000^{^}
United States (RIAA)	Gold	500,000^{^}
^{*} Sales figures based on certification alone.^{^} Shipments figures based on certification alone.
