= Sleeping on a Roller Coaster =

EP by Tommy Keene
- Released: 1992
- Genre: Power pop, rock
- Label: Matador
- Producer: Tommy Keene, Steve Carr

Professional ratings
Review scores
Source	Rating
Allmusic	link
ARTISTdirect	link

Sleeping on a Roller Coaster is an EP by Tommy Keene, released on CD in 1992 by Matador Records (catalog # OLE 039). This was his only release of new material between 1989's Based on Happy Times and 1996's Ten Years After.

== Track listing ==
All songs written by Tommy Keene

1. "Love Is a Dangerous Thing" – 3:56
2. "Driving into the Sun" – 3:29
3. "Down, Down, Down" – 3:58
4. "Alive" – 4:17
5. "Waiting to Fly" – 5:13

== Personnel ==
=== The band ===
- Tommy Keene — Vocals, guitar, keyboards
- Brad Quinn — Bass guitar, back-up vocals, piano
- John Richardson — Drums
- Justin Hibbard — Guitar ("Driving into the Sun", "Waiting to Fly")

=== Production ===
- Tommy Keene — Producer
- Steve Carr — Producer, engineer
- John Hampton — Mixing

== Additional credits ==
- Recorded at Hit and Run, Rockville, Maryland
- Mixed at Ardent, Memphis, Tennessee ("Love Is a Dangerous Thing", "Driving into the Sun", "Down, Down, Down", "Alive")
- Mixed at Hit and Run ("Waiting to Fly")
- Edward Glendinning — Photography
- Larry Zempel — Art direction and design
- Ed Morgan — Manager
- "Thanks to Ed, Cheetie, Bobby, Gerard, Chris, John H, Gary S, Josh, Eric P, Ed G, Larry Z, Seth & 9:30 Club, Steve, Joanna, Mark K, Mike, Rick, Ricky, Bo, and Doo-Ron."
