= Isolation Party =

Studio album by Tommy Keene
- Released: 1998
- Genre: Power pop, rock
- Label: Matador Records
- Producer: Tommy Keene

Tommy Keene chronology
Ten Years After (album) (1996)	Isolation Party (1998)	The Merry-Go-Round Broke Down (2002)

Professional ratings
Review scores
Source	Rating
AllMusic	4/5 stars
Chicago Tribune	3.5/4 stars
Entertainment Weekly	B−

Isolation Party is an album by the American musician Tommy Keene. It was released in 1998 by Matador Records. It includes a cover version of Mission of Burma's "Einstein's Day".

== Critical reception ==
Entertainment Weekly concluded that "power-pop enthusiasts should find plenty to admire in these melodically acute tunes, although true highlights are in short supply." The Chicago Tribune praised the "ringing, buoyant guitar lines, sing-along choruses, thoughtful lyrics and a touch of melancholy that never grows depressed but keeps things from ever getting giddy."

AllMusic wrote that the album is "a harder and leaner set than he usually offered up in his earlier days ... though the hallmarks of his style—moody but graceful melodies, a nimble and efficient rhythm section, and Keene's passionate vocals and subtly sublime guitar work—are still very much in evidence."

== Track listing ==
All songs written by Tommy Keene, except where noted

1. "Long Time Missing" – 4:38
2. "Getting Out From Under You" – 3:19
3. "Take Me Back" – 4:44
4. "Never Really Been Gone" – 3:29
5. "The World Outside" – 3:21
6. "Einstein's Day" – 4:43 (Roger Miller)
  - Originally recorded by Mission of Burma, 1982
7. "Battle Lines" – 5:11
8. "Happy When You're Sad " – 3:31
9. "Love Dies Down" – 3:44
10. "Tuesday Morning" – 2:37
11. "Waiting Without You" – 3:55
12. "Weak And Watered Down" – 4:15
13. "Twilight's In Town" – 3:38

== Personnel ==
=== The band ===
- Tommy Keene — Guitar, back-up vocals
- John Richardson — Drums, percussion

=== Additional musicians ===
- Jay Bennett — Organ, acoustic and electric guitar, bass guitar
- Leroy Bocchieri — Bass guitar
- Tom Broeske — Bass guitar
- Jeff Murphy — Back-up vocals
- Jeff Tweedy — Back-up vocals
- Jesse Valenzuela — Back-up vocals

=== Production ===
- Jay Bennett — Engineer, production assistant, editing, mastering, mixing, assistant producer
- Brendan Gamble — Engineer
- Jeff Murphy — Engineer
- Jonathan Pines — Engineer, production assistant, editing, mastering, mixing, assistant producer
- Adam Schmitt — Editing, mastering
