= Illiterature =

Studio album by Adam Schmitt
- Released: August 24, 1993
- Recorded: May 1992, October 1992 – January 1993
- Studio: Pachyderm; Schmitt's home studio
- Genre: Alternative rock power pop
- Length: 59:54
- Label: Reprise
- Producer: Adam Schmitt

Adam Schmitt chronology
World So Bright (1991)	Illiterature (1993)	Demolition (2001)

Illiterature is the second studio album from Adam Schmitt, released by Reprise Records in August 1993. The album received positive reviews but little promotion and was commercially unsuccessful. Schmitt toured with Tommy Keene to promote the record.

== Background ==
Following the release of his debut album World So Bright, Adam Schmitt suffered a near-fatal car accident that rendered him immobile for six months. During his recovery, Schmitt wrote the material for a second album. Assuming the sole responsibilities of producer, Schmitt aimed to make a more guitar-centric record than World So Bright.

== Production ==
Initial recordings were done at Pachyderm Studios in Cannon Falls, Minnesota in May 1992. Further recording was conducted at Schmitt's home studio throughout October 1992 to January 1993. Only the drum tracks and guitar solos by Jay Bennett and Tommy Keene were retained from the Pachyderm recordings, the rest was entirely overdubbed by Schmitt at his house. "Me and You", "Shreds", and "Thanks for Showing" deal with the end of a long-term relationship of Schmitt's, while "Rip It Off" and the title track were written about the grunge scene and Generation X respectively.

== Critical reception ==
John M. Borack of Trouser Press described the album as "moodier" and "grungier", calling it as "a strong sophomore success". Parke Puterbaugh of Stereo Review labeled the album as "promising" and singled out "Three Faces West"; writing that "carefully layered guitars and limpid bass tones frame an affecting vocal from Schmitt." Will Harris of A.V. Club said Illiterature found Schmitt "expanding his sonic palate" elaborating with "moving well beyond the simple form of the three-minute pop song". The Album Network said Illiterature "found the pulse of rock 'n roll in the 90s", particularly praising "Rip It Off" as "hard, angry and dark, and yet it also possesses a certain amount of melody and pop sensibility." For Southtown Star, writer John Everson called Illiterature a "brilliant second album that oozes angst, melancholy, and a rekindled determination" and awarded the album four stars.

Thomson News Service critic Richard O. Jones found Schmitt matured as an artist since World So Bright and cited "Three Faces West", "Waiting to Shine", and "Catching Up" as tracks that explore "various shades of gray". Tom Weber, reviewing for Post-Bulletin, positively compared "Shreds" and "Thanks for Showing" to John Lennon and Elvis Costello. Herald and Review writer Tim Cain named the album as the best release of 1993.

More negatively, Stewart Mason of AllMusic wrote "the grunge-style guitars obscure the songs' inherent charms and the pointless elongation of several tracks -- sounds like Schmitt was trying to pad the album to a reasonable length".

== Track listing ==
All tracks are written by Adam Schmitt.

Illiterature track listing
No.	Title	Length
1.	"Just Listen"	3:32
2.	"Waiting to Shine"	3:23
3.	"Felt So Cool"	3:00
4.	"Catching Up"	3:21
5.	"Three Faces West"	6:53
6.	"Illiterature"	3:33
7.	"More of the Same"	4:17
8.	"Rip It Off"	2:58
9.	"Me and You"	4:16
10.	"Shreds"	4:12
11.	"Thanks for Showing"	6:09
12.	"Flow"	14:11
Total length:		59:54

== Personnel ==
- Adam Schmitt – all vocals and instruments except as noted
- John Richardson – drums (Note: On all tracks except "Three Faces West", "Thanks for Showing", and "Flow")
- Brad Quinn – bass (Note: On all tracks except "Waiting to Shine", "Me and You", "Shreds", "Thanks for Showing", and "Flow")

Additional musicians

- Jay Bennett – guitar solo on "Waiting to Shine"
- Tommy Keene – end guitar solo on "Three Faces West"

Production

- Adam Schmitt – producing, engineering, mixing
- Chris Shepard – engineering, mixing
- Matt Allison – engineering, mixing
- Scott Hull – mastering
- Jon Pines – editing assistant
- Michael Wilson – photography
- Kim Champagne – art direction
- John Heiden – design
