= The Vertebrats =

American musical band

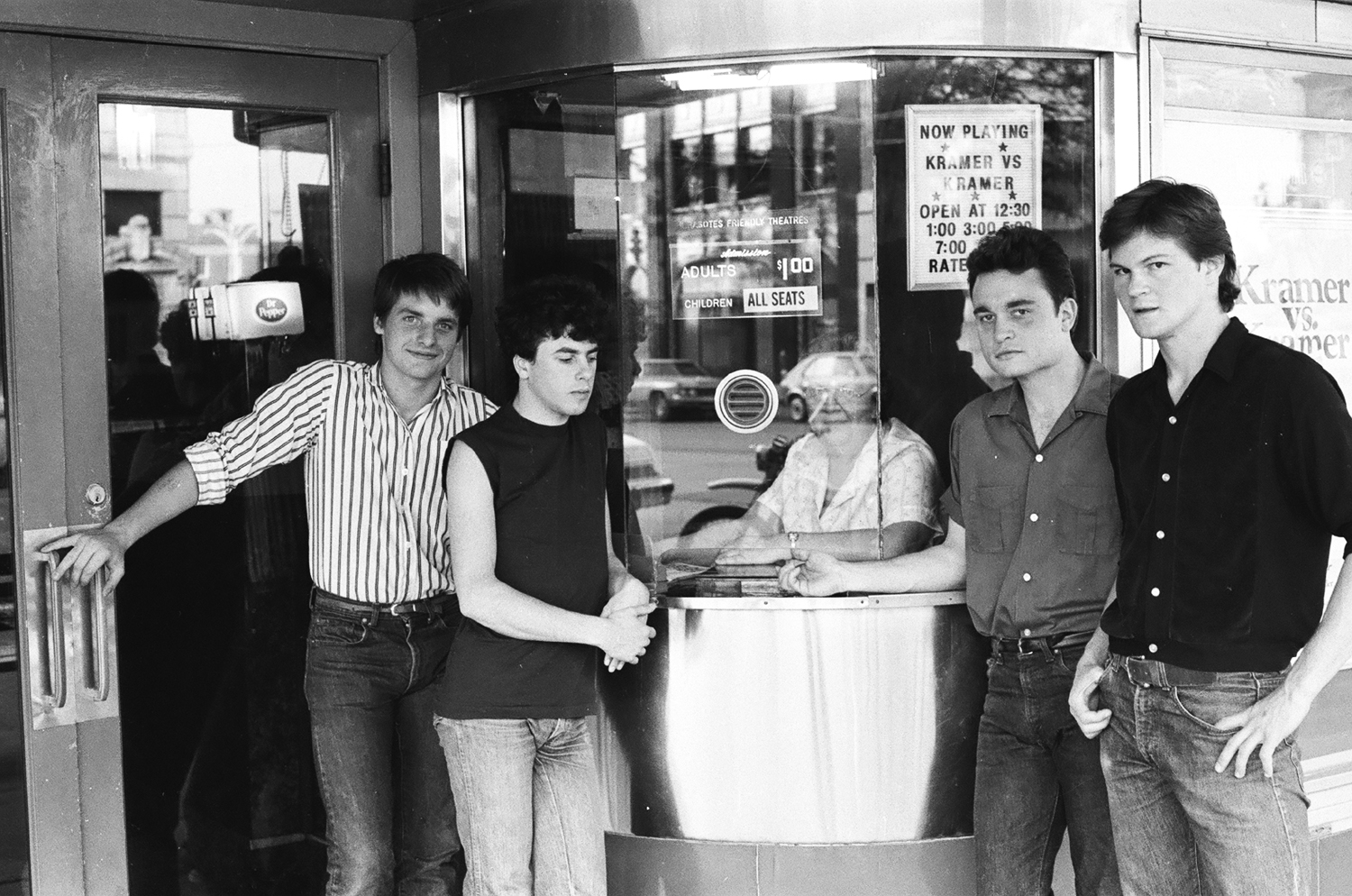
- The Vertebrats in 1981. L-to-R: Matt Brandabur, Jimmy Wald, Roy Axford, Kenny Draznik

Background information
- Origin: Urbana, Illinois
- Years active: 1979-2010

The Vertebrats were a musical group formed in the twin cities of Champaign-Urbana (CU), Illinois, initially active from 1979 until 1982. They are credited with being one of the originators of a local CU DIY music scene that still exists. The Vertebrats gained notoriety due to their energetic live performances, on-stage chemistry, numerous original compositions, a fiercely loyal local fan base, and, as time went on, other bands covering their songs.

During their initial existence (1979–82) their recorded legacy was scant. Their song “Left in the Dark” was included on Greg Shaw’s Voxx Records (a subsidiary of Shaw’s Bomp! Records label) anthology called “Battle of the Garages” released in 1981. Because this anthology LP was distributed internationally, The Vertebrats gained broad exposure. As a result, “Left in the Dark” was covered later by The Replacements, Uncle Tupelo, The Screaming Tribesmen (from Australia), and Courtney Love (her recording of it has not been officially released, but The Vertebrats have a copy of it), among others. The band put out a 7-inch 45 RPM single with “Diamonds in the Rough” and “Jackie’s Gone” on their own label (Vb Records) in 1981. Their song “Any Day Now” was included on a locally produced anthology “Stabs in the Dark” put out by Pogo Records in 1982. The CU FM radio station WPGU (107.1 MHz) honors listeners' requests for Vertebrat recordings such as "Left in the Dark" to this day.

In the early 1990s, the band posthumously released two CDs of material gleaned from various studio and home recordings. The first is called A Thousand Day Dream and the second Continuous Shows; both were released by Parasol Records of Urbana, Illinois. Taken together, the two CDs showcase over 40 original compositions. A remastered (and improved) version of “A Thousand Day Dream” was released in 2003 by the Reaction label, a subsidiary of Parasol Records.

The four members of the band's original stable lineup (from November 1979 onward) were Roy Axford Jr., Matt Brandabur, Kenny Draznik, and Jim Wald. Axford (from Urbana) and Brandabur (from Champaign) are both sons of professors at the University of Illinois. Draznik was born in Joliet, Illinois, and raised in nearby Plainfield. Wald was born and raised in Rockford, Illinois.

== Formation ==
Draznik was an English major at Illinois, and while there contributed record reviews and feature articles for the entertainment section of the student publication The Daily Illini, called “Review”. His editor was Ken Paulson, current president of the Newseum in Washington, DC, and former editor-in-chief of USA Today. Draznik and writing partner Van Cagle covered The Ramones' first visit to Champaign. Likewise, they interviewed David Johansen during his first solo tour—an interview that resulted in a story for the now infamous PUNK magazine, which, as editor John Holmstrom has put it, "started it all [in terms of punk rock.]"(John Holmstrom and Legs McNeil, eds).

For several years Draznik's roommate was Bill “Willie” Wells, who was a disc jockey at campus radio station WPGU, and who won Chicago station WXRT’s College Disc Jockey of the Year award in 1977. Besides DJing, Wells would enlist Draznik to do voice-overs for commercials that he engineered at WPGU. While spinning records one night in the fall of 1977, Wells received a call from Roy Axford, requesting that Wells play more punk rock. The two met after the show, and ended up at the house to meet Draznik. Thus started a fast friendship.

With the help of Wells, Axford started disc jockeying at WPGU with a weekly punk rock hour called The Roy Bad Show. “Roy Bad” became Axford's moniker. Axford was then a graduate student in Electrical Engineering at the University of Illinois. He had played bass in various pick-up blues bands, and drove in four Champaign County Fair demolition derbies, from 1976 to '79, because he liked to crash cars.

Draznik had been frequenting The Red Lion Inn to see bands play. He started dating a girl he had first seen at a Screams show, who introduced him to one of Matt Brandabur's siblings. At the time, Matt Brandabur was in eighth grade. Brandabur's sister suggested that Draznik play guitar with her younger brother. When it quickly became apparent what talent he had, the three – Axford, Brandabur, and Draznik - entertained the idea of starting a band. Wells assisted the trio in making home recordings, and in time, with all technical aspects of the band's performances.

== Early Shows and Drummers ==
On July 4 of 1979, the threesome (Axford, Brandabur, and Draznik) played their first performance at a backyard party in Champaign, without a drummer or a P.A. system. The event was broken up by the Champaign Police Department after a neighbor complained. Brandabur was between his freshman and sophomore years at Champaign Central High School.

Spurred on by the success of the July 4 performance, the band started practicing in earnest in the basement of the Brandabur family residence at 1206 S. Elm Blvd. in Champaign. Knowing they wouldn't go far without a drummer, they recruited a high-school classmate of Brandabur, Larry Crotser, to play drums.

The Vertebrats were invited to play a birthday party for the popular local film guru Greg Springer on July 23. While the band was setting up for the planned outdoor event in Springer's driveway, the Champaign Police Department arrived as soon as the amps were plugged in and put a stop to it for lack of a permit. Undeterred, the entire party moved indoors to Caucus Studios in downtown Champaign, about a mile away. The relocated event was a smashing success. Thus began a string of raucous parties at Caucus Studios featuring the Vertebrats and other fledgling CU bands of the summer and fall of 1979. Caucus Studios was a proto-loft of live-in work studios, which were inhabited by an assortment of art students, musicians, and other members of CU's “in-crowd”. The parties were held on the 2nd floor in a long and wide hallway connecting the various studios that served as stage and dance floor.

Brandabur had a Champaign Central H.S. classmate, John Richardson, who was already playing drums in another band. Brandabur recruited Richardson to play a Halloween (1979) party at Caucus Studios with the Vertebrats. Since there was no time for Richardson to practice with the band prior to the party, Axford, Draznik, and Brandabur would turn and tell Richardson the basic beat of each song before performing it. Although his performance that night was stellar, Richardson was unable to continue playing with the Vertebrats due to prior commitments. (Richardson went on to have a successful professional career as a drummer in several rock and roll bands. He currently drums for the Gin Blossoms.)

Meanwhile, multi-instrumentalist Jim Wald had moved to Champaign from Rockford. Wald would come down to the basement to watch Matt, Kenny, and Roy practice and provide (mostly welcome) advice. Wald had been a professional bass player in several Rockford area bands, including Nicknames and China, and was also talented with a six-string guitar. Wald also had formal drum training, having played in his junior high school's band. Considering that, Axford talked him into playing drums for the Vertebrats. The Vertebrats finally had a permanent drummer.

In order to have a place to practice over which the band could exercise greater control, Axford and Draznik rented a house on N. Lincoln Ave. in Urbana in August 1979. Axford and Draznik lived there (Brandabur and Wald remained domiciled at “1206”) and set up the living room as the Vertebrats’ practice space. Loaned equipment and ideas for easy-to-learn cover songs were generously provided by Brad Stakely of Screams (later known as Brad “Elvis”) and other professional members of the CU music scene. Through frequent and loud practice sessions (one resulting in a late night visit from the Urbana Police Dept.), the Vertebrats forged themselves into a tighter band in the house on N. Lincoln Ave. During the fall of 1979, Axford finished his MS thesis in electrical engineering at the kitchen table while Draznik penned the future classics “Diamonds in the Rough”, “Left in the Dark”, and "Jackie's Gone". The band's song “Robbery” was also written in that house, starting out as a jam session, with the lyrics inspired by an actual burglary perpetrated there by a group of minors, one of who was chased down and apprehended by Axford and Draznik after catching them in the act upon returning home early one evening. As the weather grew colder in late 1979, the Vertebrats were polishing songs that would help make them CU's most popular band by the summer of 1980.

The Vertebrats were booked to play a December 6, 1979 show at the Channing-Murray Foundation, a Unitarian Universalist meeting hall on the U. of I. campus, opening for a Springfield band called Food and Money. Approximately 50 people attended. The response to the show, which included a positive review in a local paper, was a turning point for new music in CU.

Kent Carrico, an assertive jewelry salesman, was also a family friend. After seeing the Vertebrats perform, Carrico passionately convinced the band that he should be their manager and set about getting them a booking at Mabel's, a large, upstairs nightclub at 613 E. Green Street in the “campustown” section of Champaign. Mabel's had recently started booking rock and roll bands (e.g., Kool Ray and the Polaroids) in addition to the jazz and R&B groups that were their sole initial offerings. At that time (early 1980), Mabel's was emerging as a fresh alternative to the more established CU rock and roll clubs such as the venerable yet sticky-floored Red Lion Inn. Carrico correctly sensed that the Vertebrats, with their rather unusual sound (for CU at the time), would be better able to break new ground in a club with little prior rock and roll history.

Armed with a Vertebrat demo tape and a won't-take-no-for-an-answer sense of determination, Carrico obtained the band their first nightclub (and first paying) booking. On Sunday night, March 16, 1980, the Vertebrats debuted at Mabel's to a crowd of approximately 100, which included many Caucus Studios regulars and some bewildered stragglers. Over the next two-and-a-half years, the Vertebrats were a mainstay at Mabel's, regularly drawing crowds in excess of the fire marshal's limit (about 450 persons). Over that time, the Vertebrats opened for larger name acts at Mabel's such as Ultravox, Joan Jett & the Blackhearts, and the Cramps. The Vertebrats also opened for the Ramones at the University of Illinois Auditorium and the progressive rock band Spirit at the nightclub Tuts in Chicago.

What separated The Vertebrats from other CU bands of the 1980-'82 era was their original songwriting and on-stage chemistry. They typically played three 45-minute sets, at least 2/3 of which were original songs. Eventually, the band had three 45-minute sets worth of entirely original material. The Vertebrats influences included 1960s British Invasion, 1960s Garage Rock, 1970s Punk and New Wave, and Country. They exhibited few pretensions on-stage, which helped form a bond between them and the audience, who rewarded the band with fierce loyalty. Several individual fans were present at nearly every Vertebrats show after their Mabel's debut.

== Recording ==
The Vertebrats’ first multitrack recording session was in January 1980 in the basement studios of WPGU, engineered by Willie Wells. The men's restroom served as a reverb chamber for vocal tracks. WPGU disc jockey Jon Ginoli overheard the band while working in the music library. It would be Ginoli who later gave the Vertebrats their first airplay on his popular New Wave show, Waves. (Ginoli later moved to San Francisco and gained fame with his band Pansy Division.) The most enduring recording from this first session was a version of Draznik's "Put Your Toys Away", which includes a tenor saxophone solo by Brian Sanders, a WPGU DJ (and saxophonist) who just happened to be passing through the station with his instrument during the recording session. Sanders improvised his part after hearing the song once.

The Vertebrats’ first real studio experience was at Mark Rubel and Tim Vear's Faithful Sound Studios in Urbana. From that session came their only single (7" vinyl, 45 RPM): "Diamonds in the Rough"/"Jackie's Gone". The band assembled and glued together every record's jacket by hand, and sold them to local record stores. (This single saw two pressings. A copy of the second pressing sold from Sydney, Australia on Australian eBay for $66.09AUD on January 8, 2010. The seller's eBay handle was "studcola".) Rubel currently operates Pogo Studio, and has recorded a vast array of artists, including Champaign's Hum, Alison Krauss, and Poster Children.

Unbeknown to the band, Jon Ginoli sent a tape of Vertebrat recordings to Bomp Records president Greg Shaw for possible inclusion in his Battle of the Garages compilation LP. Shaw selected “Left in the Dark” and used it as the second track on side 1 of the LP. The Vertebrats played as part of a mini-tour in support of the album, at 7th Street Entry in Minneapolis and Gaspar's in Chicago. A Milwaukee, WI date was cancelled.

The two Parasol CDs – A Thousand Day Dream and Continuous Shows – include many songs recorded at the band's second rented house (where Axford, Draznik, and Wald lived together from August 1980 to August 1982) at 1204 N. Neil Street in Champaign, near the end of their initial existence. The band set to the task of recording every original composition for copyrighting purposes, before they set out for three live gigs and a recording session (funded by Bomp Records' Greg Shaw) in California in July 1982. Each of those recordings was done in a single take, recorded in the dining room/practice room by Willie Wells, and destined only, so the band thought at the time, for a shelf at the Library of Congress. In other words, at the time they were made, the recordings were not intended for public distribution.

A Thousand Day Dream includes the version of "Put Your Toys Away" with the Brian Sanders saxophone solo mentioned above. The original release of A Thousand Day Dream is prized by collectors for its egregious production error on "Toys", which slowed the song's tempo and lowered its pitch. The remastered re-release of A Thousand Day Dream on Parasol's Reaction label is sought after by Vertebrats fans for correcting this version of "Toys" to the original tempo and pitch. Furthermore, the front cover of the original release of A Thousand Day Dream has the photograph of the band members reversed. The re-release corrects this as well, so that Jim Wald's head is in between "The" and "Vertebrats" as originally intended by Ken Draznik, who designed the cover art.

== Dissolution and reunions ==
The Vertebrats were never a full-time band. Brandabur was attending high school throughout the band's existence, while the others worked during the week. Outside of the Champaign-Urbana area they only played in Chicago (including such nightclubs as Schuba's and Tuts, where they opened for Spirit), Indianapolis (at Crazy Al's), Carbondale, Rantoul (at the Chanute AFB Enlisted Men's Club - The Pit and The Ping), Bloomington-Normal, and Minneapolis (at the 7th Street Entry). In July 1982 they traveled to California for a working vacation. They played two shows in San Diego, which were booked by Tim Maze (now owner of The Casbah and two restaurants in San Diego): a headlining gig at King's Road Café (at 4034 30th St. in North Park, now defunct) and a gig opening for visiting New Yorker Tom Verlaine at The Spirit Club (at 1130 Buenos Avenue in the Morena District, now Brick by Brick), and a gig in Santa Monica at Madame Wong's West (which still exists). The Spirit Club gig was notable for the following reason: The Vertebrats got an encore, but the headliner did not.

Upon their return to CU, the band played a few more times in Champaign, and then decided to break up. The band played their last gig of their initial era at Mabel's on September 11, 1982, commemorating the occasion by playing their entire catalog of original songs in alphabetical order. Reunion concerts were held in 1992, 1995, and 2006. They most recently played a fourth reunion on October 2 and 3, 2009, in Champaign, at the Cowboy Monkey and the High Dive, respectively.

== Present day ==
The original members of The Vertebrats (Axford, Brandabur, Draznik, and Wald) last performed together on Saturday, July 17, 2010, in Chicago, IL at a private rooftop party. Draznik and Wald currently write and record new music as The Surly Bells. They released a CD single in 2016 with the songs "After All This Time" and "Young And Bittersweet." In 2015, Brandabur recorded a three-song CD with The Brow Beaters titled "Move My Car" with the songs "Dream People," "Do My Job," and "Move My Car." Axford is not currently involved in playing music.

== Personnel ==
=== Years 1979 through 1982 ===
- Roy Axford Jr. - Bass, Occasional Lead and Backing Vocals, Owner of the 1977 Dodge Tradesman Van used to haul the Vertebrats' equipment
- Matt Brandabur – Lead Guitar, Lead and Backing Vocals
- Ken Draznik – Rhythm Guitar, Occasional Lead Guitar, Lead and Backing Vocals
- Jim Wald – Drums, Lead Vocals, Guitar (in-studio)

==== Crew ====
- Bill "Willie" Wells - Live Sound, House Recording, Studio Engineering
- Mark Rubel - Studio Recording
- Ruscho Lighting, Inc. - Lights
- Kent Carrico - Booking, Management, Spiritual Guidance
- Kim Butler - Road Support

=== Thereafter ===
- Roy Axford Jr. - Bass, Occasional Lead and Backing Vocals
- Matt Brandabur – Lead Guitar, Lead and Backing Vocals
- Ken Draznik – Rhythm Guitar, Occasional Lead Guitar, Lead and Backing Vocals
- Jim Wald – Drums (when John Richardson is unavailable), Lead Vocals, Guitar (on-stage and in-studio), Mandolin
- John Richardson - Drums Myspace
- Paul Chastain - Bass (in Axford's absence from the 2006 and Oct 3, 2009 reunion shows)
- Mark Rubel - Bass (in Axford's absence from the Oct 2, 2009 reunion show)

==== Crew ====
- Yuri Marder - Photography
- Bill "Willie" Wells - Live Sound, House Recording, Studio Engineering
- Mark Rubel - Studio Recording
- Kim Butler - Guitars, Amps, Guitar Tech

== Discography ==
=== LPs/Singles/EP/Cassettes ===
- "Screaming Like a Mad Choir" 12" vinyl (Parasol Records PARLP119) May 2011
- "Jackie’s Gone" / "Diamonds in the Rough" (Vb Records) 1981
- Revert – Double 7” vinyl EP re-release of "Left in the Dark", "Diamonds in the Rough", "Jackie’s Gone", "Any Day Now", "Teen Seen", and "Robbery" (Parasol PAR-011) 1992
- The Vertebrats and Friends – self-released cassette with “Don’t I Know You?”, “What Do You Say?”, “She’s a Wreck”, “One Notion (Angela)”, “Crowd the Sky”, “Born Blue”

=== Compact Discs ===
- A Thousand Day Dream (Parasol-CD-002) 1993
- Continuous Shows (Parasol-CD-007) 1993
- A Thousand Day Dream (Remastered and improved) (Reaction Recordings – REACT-CD-003) 2003
- Left Right in the Dark - The Best of the Vertebrats (Vb Records - VbR-002) 2018

=== Vertebrat songs included on anthologies ===
- "Left in the Dark" - Battle of the Garages - LP – Voxx Records, VXS 200.006, 1981
- "Any Day Now" - Stabs in the Dark – LP – Pogo Records, PR 001, 1982
- "Diamonds in the Rough" – Record Service 20th Birthday - CD - RS#20, 1989
- "Left in the Dark" – Battle of the Garages (Part I) - CD – Voxx Records, VCD 2067, ASIN B000003A2U, 1993
- "Left in the Dark" – Destination Bomp! - CD - Bomp Records, ASIN B000003JG7, 1994
- "Diamonds in the Rough" – Sweet Sixteen, Vol. 7 - CD - Parasol-Promo-007, 1999
- "Left in the Dark" – Be a Caveman - CD - Voxx Records, ASIN B00004R8OV, 2000

== Vertebrat songs covered by other artists ==
- The Coal Gems, "Left in the Dark"
- D. T. and the Shakes, "Left in the Dark"
- The Leonards, "Left in the Dark" on Garage Sale, © 2006 Straysounds (628740809822),
  - NOTE: A portion of The Leonards' recording of "Left in the Dark" was used in a scene of the Ugly Betty television program.
- Courtney Love, "Left in the Dark" (unreleased).
- Mondo Topless, "Left in the Dark" on their all-covers CD Freaking Out (2010; self-released).
- The Prime Movers, "Left in the Dark", Back in Line CD (self-released).
- The Replacements, "Left in the Dark" (listed as “Left Here in the Dark”) on The Shit Hits the Fans (Twin/Tone) TTR8443 (1985) Cassette The Sky Way
- The Screaming Tribesmen, "Left in the Dark" on “Survival of the Fittest” Ryko anthology CD ASIN B000DZFPJS
- The Screaming Tribesmen, "Left in the Dark" on “Take Cover” EP (1989) Survival – 655 147.6
- The Screaming Tribesmen, "Left in the Dark" on “High Time” Survival – SUR 507 CD and Rattlesnake – 507 CD
- The Screaming Tribesmen, "Left in the Dark" on “The Savage Beat of the Screaming Tribesmen” Shock Records—October 23, 2006
- The Swales, "Left in the Dark"
- Uncle Tupelo, "Left in the Dark", Promo Record to Radio Stations
- Uncle Tupelo, "Left in the Dark" on 89/93: An Anthology 12” Vinyl (2002) Columbia / Legacy/ Sundazed P2 58928, UPC 074646222324
- Uncle Tupelo, "Left in the Dark" on No Depression (Bonus Tracks) CD (March 11, 2003) (Sony)
- Uncle Tupelo, "Left in the Dark" on No Depression (+6) Rhino Records – 86427
- The Martyrs, "How Come (You Don't Like Me)"

== Books ==
A Thousand Day Dream - Lyrics to the Songs of The Vertebrats, Parasol Press.

== Articles ==
- Almost Famous by Robert Loerzel Pioneer Press
- One of the Last Best Next Big Things: The Vertebrats by Crystalline Scoggins and William Gillespie
- Diamonds in the Rough: An Interview with The Vertebrats by Joe Pence
