= Bongo Boy Records =

Bongo Boy Records is an American record label founded in 2010 by songwriter Gar Francis and Dutch entrepreneur Monique Grimme.

== History ==
Founded in 2010. The label represents all genres and specializes in garage rock, rock and blues and Compilation albums.

In 2011 Bongo Boy Records started a syndicated television show on NBC Comcast and 9 other major cable companies called 'The Bongo Boy Rock n’ Roll TV Show Series'. In 2014 the TV show series changed it to the old MTV format with featuring music videos from around the world. In 2015 the TV show series was picked up by Galaxy Global Network, Dish and ROKU. In 2016 a non exclusive distribution deal was signed with Captiva Entertainment Group out of Texas. The TV show series is also available On Demand with Vimeo.

In 2013 two of Mark Lindsay's singles became Coolest Song in the World of the Week: "Like Nothing That You Have Seen" and "Show Me The Love". Released on Bongo Boy Records which was Mark Lindsay's first rock album after 10 years. The album was called Life Out Loud co written and produced by Mark Lindsay and Gar Francis.

In 2014 Gar Francis, Kenny Aaronson, Kurt Reil and Bruce Ferguson formed The Satisfactors and released on Bongo Boy Records a full-length album. In 2014 a distribution deal was signed with Asia largest digital distributor Kanjian in Hong Kong. Later that same year digital compilations were added to the roster and distributed worldwide. A November 2017 article in Rolling Stone Magazine mentions Bongo Boy Records as using modern methods "play the Grammy game".

Their compilations span many different genres: Blues, Garage Rock, Surf, Americana, and even Gospel Blues.

In 2018, Bongo Boy released Lyia Meta's “Slumber” on a compilation CD. The Malaysian Singer-Songwriter had just previously won "Artist of the Year" at The Josie Music Awards; she was the only Malaysian out of 13,000 contestants.

Bongo Boy Records continues (as of 2024) to release singles, albums, and compilations worldwide. Focus on distribution and promotions for international artists.

== Artists ==
Artists include Mark Lindsay, former lead singer of Paul Revere & The Raiders, Blues musician Plainfield Slim, Jaisen Taylor, Gar Francis, Kelly Caruso, The Easy Outs, the Rockids, Jana Peri, Genya Ravan, Canadian artist Jon Mullane, The Swinging Iggies, members of the Doughboys under the moniker Jackie Kringles & the Elves. Also signed to the label are Swiss recording artist Michael Resin, Country artist Jordan Green, Americana artist Tom Vicario, Blues Rock artist Oddslane, Beatlemania (musical) original cast member Les Fradkin.
