= Kevin Kastning =

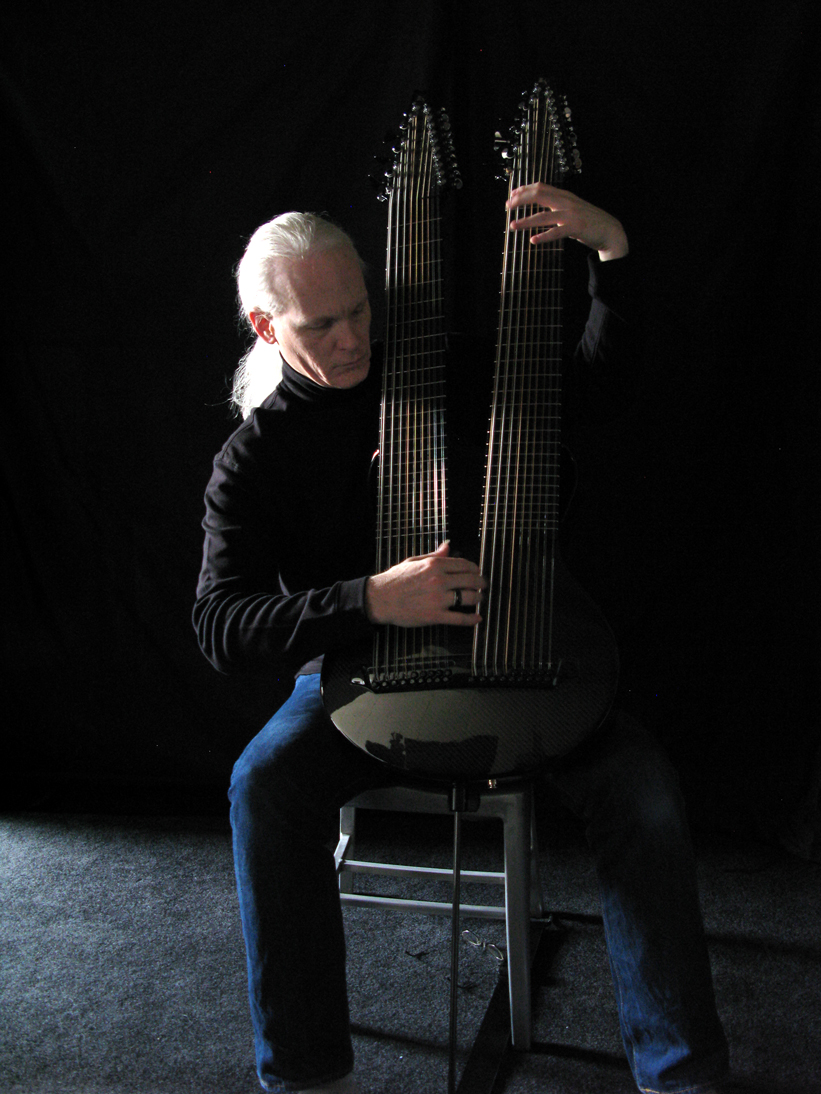
- Kevin Kastning with the 36-string Kevin Kastning Signature Double Contraguitar by Emerald Guitars

Background information
- Origin: USA
- Genres: modern classical, avant-garde acoustic, jazz
- Instruments: 36-string Double Contraguitar, 30-string Contra-Alto guitar, 16-, 17-, and 18-string Contraguitars, 30-string Double Contraguitar, 26-string Double Subcontraguitar, 24-string Double Subcontraguitar, 15-string Extended Classical guitar, 17-string Hybrid Extended Classical guitar, 12-string guitar, six-string guitar, fretless guitar, 12-string extended baritone guitar, 6-string bass-baritone guitar, 12-string alto guitar, 12-string soprano guitar, mandolin, piano, bass
- Years active: 1979-present
- Label: Greydisc Records
- Website: www.kevinkastning.com

Kevin Kastning (born in Wichita, Kansas) is an American guitarist, composer and musical instrument inventor. He plays the 36-string Double Contraguitar, 30-string Double Contraguitar, 30-string Contra-Alto guitar, 24-string Double Subcontraguitar, 18-string Contraguitar, 17-string Hybrid Extended Classical guitar, 15-string Extended Classical guitar, twelve-string guitar, six-string guitar, fretless guitar, 12-string extended baritone guitar, 6-string bass-baritone guitar, alto guitar, the 14-string contraguitar, the 16-string contraguitar, the 17-string contraguitar, 12-string soprano guitar, mandolin, piano, and bass.

== History ==
Kastning's father was a musician, and Kevin began on trumpet at age 7. By age 11 he had his first guitar. He attended Wichita East High School during which time he was in the school orchestra and jazz ensemble as well as in several bands. Kastning attended Wichita State University between 1980 and 1984, graduating with a Bachelor of Music. While there he studied composition under the tutelage of Pulitzer Prize winning composer, Walter Mays. In 1985, Kastning moved to Boston, Massachusetts, where he pursued graduate studies at Berklee College of Music for 2 years. At Berklee, Kastning studied with Walter Beasley and John la Porta while being privately tutored by guitar legend Pat Metheny. Between the years of 1985 and 1990 he played in numerous jazz chamber groups, playing at clubs throughout the greater Boston and Hartford area are as well as in his own jazz ensemble, the Kevin Kastning Unit, which released a self-titled album in 1988. The Kevin Kastning Unit included Carl Clements on tenor and soprano saxophone with which Kastning has maintained a working relationship.

Since that time, Kastning has made numerous notable collaborative contemporary classical guitar recordings, which are largely improvised. Kastning plays a number of guitar family instruments of his own imagining on his albums including a 36-string Double Contraguitar, a 30-string Contra-Soprano guitar, 6-string bass-baritone guitar, a 12-string extended baritone guitar, a 12-string alto guitar, and 16-string, 17-string, and 18-string Contraguitars and Sub-Contraguitars. His music consistently receives strong reviews in the experimental acoustic music community and other modern abstract traditions. Irish painter, Ken Browne's March 2011 exhibition 'Odyssey II' at the Origin Art Gallery (Dublin) featured abstract paintings based on Kastning's music.

Kastning has invented a number of guitar family instruments which extend the traditional range of the guitar into new territory.

Kastning is an artist endorser for Martin Guitars as a Martin Artist, Santa Cruz Guitar Company, Daniel Roberts Stringworks, Anvil Cases, Emerald Guitars, Godin Guitars, Enhanced Audio, Bricasti Design, Kelsone, Peluso, John Pearse Strings, Cervantes Classical Guitars, Microtech Gefell Microphones, G7 Performance Capos, ToneRite, Hipshot, and K&K Sound.

=== Recording artist ===
In 1990 Kastning was invited by colleague and fellow guitarist to form the KastningSiegfried Duet Project, and over the next several years they wrote and recorded 5 albums of acoustic, experimental classical guitar compositions which were all released on the label, Greydisc. The KastningSiefried Duet Project is ongoing although Kastning has moved away from performing and recording composed music and favors instead improvisation in the recording studio.

In 2006 Kastning began a long term collaboration with Hungarian guitarist, Sandor Szabo. Together they have released multiple albums, on the Greydisc label, each of which is completely improvised, or composed in real time within the studio. Each album was recorded in a single day and each track represents a one time recording without overdubs or multiple takes. Szabo and Kastning toured Hungary in 2009 with guitarist, Dominic Miller, who is well known for playing with Sting (musician).

In 2009, Kastning met British electric guitarist Mark Wingfield and proceeded the following year to record an ambient, electro-acoustic album of improvised guitar duets with Wingfield which was released on Greydisc Records. In 2012 Kastning and Wingfield released a second album of wholly improvised ambient duets entitled "An Illustrated Silenece".

During the 2009 Szabo/Kastning European tour, Kastning recorded a trio album, entitled "Triptych", with Szabo and percussionist, Balazs Major on location in Nograd. Triptych was released on Greydisc Records in December 2011. The album has drawn comparisons to the recordings of Ralph Towner and John Abercrombie.

Kastning toured Europe a second time in March 2012 with Szabo and Major in support of Triptych with a concert entitled "Kontaktus". The concert was a melding of sound poetry and movement featuring two Hungarian dancers from the Hungarian National Ballet, Timea Gyorke and Judith Szamosi. The tour included dates in Budapest, Debrecen and Vacz. In Vac Kastning and Szabo recorded a duo album entitled "The Book of Crossing", which was released on Greydisc Records later the same year, as well as a trio album with Major, "Becoming", which was released in March 2013.

In 2012, Kastning released a duo album with longtime musical collaborator Carl Clements entitled "Dreaming As I Knew". The album represents various improvised contemporary classical duets with combinations of Kastning's guitar family instruments and Clements multiple wind instruments.

In 2012 Kastning also released a duo album with famous bassist, Michael Manring entitled "In Winter" an exploratory album of improvised compositions.

=== Composer ===
In addition to performing, Kastning is a modern classical composer with over 200 compositions for various chamber and solo instrumentation, including ten piano sonatas, seven string quartets and numerous works for unusual instrument duets, trio, quartets and quintets. Kastning's works have been performed annually by the London Chamber Group since 2001.

=== Inventor ===
Kastning has invented a number of guitar family instruments in collaboration with Dan Roberts. The two met in 1999 when Kastning commissioned a guitar from the Santa Cruz Guitar Co, where Roberts was the production manager. By 2002, Kastning was an artist endorser for the Santa Cruz Guitar Co. Kastning is interested in extending the pitch range of the guitar and from this, he has developed several unique instruments with Roberts. The first instrument was the DKK 6-string extended baritone guitar, a 13 fret D baritone, voiced for a low G tuning developed in 2005 with Roberts and the Santa Cruz Guitar Co. The second was the Santa Cruz DKK-12 string extended baritone guitar, a 13 fret, D baritone voiced for a low F# tuning developed in 2005/06 . The third, the Santa Cruz KK-alto, a 12 string alto guitar in A, was developed in 2008. Kastning continued his collaboration with Roberts after Roberts left Santa Cruz Guitar Co to form his own company, Daniel Roberts Stringworks. In 2007 Kastning commissioned at 14 string contraguitar from Roberts which was completed in 2010. A second Contraguitar was commissioned from Roberts in 2011 to be utilized in alternate tunings. In 2012 Roberts converted one of Kastning's contraguitars to a 17-string, 9-course contraguitar.

In 2012 Kastning collaborated with Alistair Hay of the Irish company, Emerald Guitars, to conceive of and build a 30 string double-necked guitar. The guitar model was named "Triocha," the Kevin Kastning Signature Model, and combines an 18-string Contra guitar neck with a 12-string alto guitar neck providing an unorthodox tonal range. This instrument is known as the Kevin Kastning Signature Series 30-string Contra-Alto guitar

In 2013, Kastning again collaborated with Alistair Hay of the Irish company, Emerald Guitars, to conceive of and build the 36-string Double Contraguitar. This doubleneck instrument consists of two 18-string Contraguitars used in two different tunings. This instrument provides both an extended range and an unorthodox harmonic palette. The 36-string Double Contraguitar and the 30-string Contra-Soprano guitar have become Kastning's main instruments for both concerts and recordings. This instrument is known as the Kevin Kastning Signature Series 36-string Double Contraguitar.

In 2014, Kastning once again collaborated with Alistair Hay of the Irish company, Emerald Guitars, to conceive of and build the 15-string Extended Classical guitar. This is a classical nylon-string guitar with six double-courses, and three bass single courses. It also features a Multi-scale. This is known as the Kevin Kastning Signature Series 15-string Extended Classical guitar.

In 2017-2018, Kastning again collaborated with Alistair Hay of the Irish company, Emerald Guitars, to conceive of and build the 17-string Hybrid Extended Classical guitar. This is a double-course classical guitar, with each course consisting of one nylon string and one steel string. The low sub-A or sub-B course is the only single course. It also features a Multi-scale. This is known as the Kevin Kastning Signature Series 17-string Hybrid Extended Classical guitar.

In 2023, Kastning again collaborated with Alistair Hay of Emerald Guitars, to conceive of and build the 24-string Double Sub-Contraguitar, and the 24-string Double Contraguitar. Kastning later modified the 24-string Double Contraguitar into the 30-string Double Contraguitar, which features six triple courses.

In 2024-2025, Kastning once again collaborated with Alistair Hay of Emerald Guitars, to conceive of and build the 28-string Double Sub-Contraguitar, which features two triple courses.

Kastning resides in Maine US.

== Awards and honors ==
- Resonance, The Perfect Sound magazine's Top 10 Albums of 2007
- Parabola, NPR one of The Best Albums of the Year for 2009
- I Walked into the Silver Darkness, Favorite of 2011, WFMU-FM, 2011
- An Illustrated Silence, top ten album, New York City's WFMU-FM, 2012
- Book of Crossings, top ten albums of 2012, Acoustic Guitar It was also named one of the top 20 albums of 2012 by FAME magazine.
- In Winter, Best Instrumental Album of 2012 by Latewire magazine
- Dark Sonatas, top ten album by WFMU-FM and Acoustic Music, 2013
- Becoming, top ten album, Acoustic Music, 2013
- Artist of the Month August 2014; K&K Sound
- KDNK Radio Network Hall of Fame, added September 2014
- Watercolor Sky, 2014 Album of the Year, Acoustic Music
- In Stories, top 10 2014 Albums of the Year by Acoustic Music
- Otherworld, WFMU Favorite Album of 2015.
- Kastning's 2015 Greydisc solo release "Otherworld" is named as one of the Best Albums of 2015 by The Perfect Sound Forever magazine.
- Eleven Rooms, one of the Best Albums of 2015, The Perfect Sound Forever magazine.
- Otherworld, No. 1 on the iTunes Classical chart for the week of September 22, 2015.
- The albums 17/66, Ethereal I, Even this late it happens, and Kismaros were in first-round voting for the 2020 Grammy® Awards.
- The albums Convergence I and Nograd were in first-round voting for the 2021 Grammy® Awards.
- The albums The First Realm, Ethereal IV, and Rubicon I were in first-round voting for the 2022 Grammy® Awards.
- The albums Levitation I and Ethereal V were in first-round voting for the 2023 Grammy® Awards.
- The albums Levitation II, Ethereal VI, and Strand in Strands were in first-round voting for the 2024 Grammy® Awards.
- The albums The Second Realm, In Visible Ascent, Silent Dimensions, and Unbending Sky were in first-round voting for the 2025 Grammy® Awards.
- The albums Intervallum, Ethereal VII, Triple Helix, and Partitas, Book 1 were in first-round voting for the 2026 Grammy® Awards.
- The albums Interchange One, Unreal City, and Codex II were in first-round voting for the 2027 Grammy® Awards.

== Discography ==
All albums on Greydisc Records, unless otherwise noted.

As a solo artist:

- Otherworld (2015)
- Skyfields (2016)
- A Connection of Secrets (2017)
- 17/66 (2018)
- 30/36 (2018)
- Piano I (2019)
- Codex I (2026)
- Codex II (2026)
- Codex III (2026)
- Codex IV (2026)

As a leader or co-leader:

with Sándor Szabó

- Resonance (2007)
- Parallel Crossings (2008)
- Parabola (2009)
- Returning (2010)
- The Book of Crossings (2012)
- Perspectives (2016)
- Invocation (2017)
- Ethereal I (2018)
- Ethereal III (2019)
- Nógrád (2020)
- Ethereal VI (2023)
- Unbending Sky (2024)
- Ethereal VII (2024)
- To capture the light (2025)
- The path at the end of the mind (2026)

with Mark Wingfield

- I Walked into the Silver Darkness (2011)
- An Illustrated Silence (2012)
- Dark Sonatas (2013)
- In Stories (2014)
- Eleven Rooms (2015)
- The Line to Three (2017)
- Rubicon I (2021)
- I dreamed of invisible journeys (2022)
- Rubicon II (2024)
- The WNYC Sessions (2025)
- 2+2 (2026)

with Sandor Szabo & Balazs Major

- Triptych (2011)
- Becoming (2013)
- Ethereal II (2018)
- Ethereal IV (2021)
- Ethereal V (2022)

with Sándor Szabó & Carl Clements

- Convergence I (2020)
- Convergence II (2021)
- Convergence III (2023)

with Carl Clements

- Dreaming As I Knew (2012)
- Nowhere, Now Here (2013)
- Watercolor Sky (2014)
- A Far Reflection (2016)
- Even this late it happens (2017)
- Strand in Strands (2022)
- Partitas, Book 1 (2024)
- Though Seldom Revealed (2025)
- Only Then (2026)

KastningSiegfried

- Binary Forms (1992)
- Book of Days (2002; reissued 2018)
- Bichromial (2004)
- Scalar Fields (2005)
- Gravity of Shadows (2011)

with Michael Manring

- In Winter (2012)

with Balazs Major

- Kismaros (2018)

with Soheil Peyghambari

- The First Realm (2021)
- The Second Realm (2024)

with Laszlo Gardony

- Levitation I (2022)
- Levitation II (2023)
- Cartography (2025)

with Bruno Råberg

- Silent Dimensions (2024)
- Across Tall Rain (2026)

with Phil Grenadier

- In Visible Ascent (2024)
- Unreal City (2026)

with Carl Clements & Soheil Peyghambari

- Triple Helix (2025)

with Bruno Raberg and Phil Grenadier

- Intervallum (2025)

with Paul Wertico

- Interchange One (2026)
- Interchange Two (2026)

Other

- The Kevin Kastning Unit (1988)
- International Unfretted Artists (IUA, 2008)
- The Open Road Volume 1 (Moonjune, 2013)
- Escape the Mind, Volume 3 (Bongo Boy Records, 2020)
- Escape the Mind, Volume 4 (Bongo Boy Records, 2024)
