= Show Tunes =

Show Tunes or Showtune or variation, may refer to:

- Show tune, popular song as part of a stage show

== Albums ==
- Show Tunes, a 1995 album by Shirley Jones
- Show Tunes (album), a 1989 album by Rosemary Clooney
- Showtunes (Tommy Keene album), a 2000 album by Tommy Keene
- Showtunes (Stephin Merritt and Chen Shi-zheng album), a 2006 album by Chen Shi-zheng and Stephen

== Other uses ==
- Showtune (musical), Off Broadway musical revue

== See also ==
- Show (disambiguation)
- Tune (disambiguation)
