= People You Know =

People You Know may refer to:

- "People You Know", song from the 2008 album Dance Gavin Dance by Dance Gavin Dance
- "People You Know", song from the 2011 album Outside by Tapes n' Tapes
- "People You Know", song from the 2020 album Rare by Selena Gomez
- "People You Know", song by Robynn Ragland
