= Showtunes (Tommy Keene album) =

Live album by Tommy Keene
- Released: 2000
- Recorded: 1998–2000
- Genre: Power pop, rock
- Label: Parasol

Professional ratings
Review scores
| Source | Rating |
|---|---|
| Allmusic | Link |

Showtunes is a live album by Tommy Keene. It came out in 2000 on the Parasol Records label. Along with in-concert versions of original compositions, the album includes a cover version of Mission of Burma's "Einstein's Day".

== Track listing ==
All songs by Tommy Keene, except where noted.

1. "Astronomy"/"This Could Be Fiction" – 6:10
2. "Long Time Missing" – 4:34
3. "Nothing Can Change You" – 3:48
4. "Silent Town" – 4:45
5. "Underworld" – 5:33
6. "Going Out Again" – 2:11
7. "Paper Words and Lies" – 3:17
8. "My Mother Looked Like Marilyn Monroe" – 4:04
9. "Einstein's Day" – 4:30 (Roger Miller)
  - Originally recorded by Mission of Burma, 1982
10. "Highwire Days" – 3:39
11. "When Our Vows Break" – 4:03 (Keene, Jules Shear)
12. "Compromise" – 3:21
13. "Based on Happy Times" – 3:51
14. "Back to Zero Now" – 3:24
15. "Places That Are Gone" – 16:42

== Personnel ==
=== Musicians ===
- Tommy Keene – Vocals, guitar
- Steve Gerlach – Guitar
- Scott A. Johnson – Guitar
- Brad Quinn – Bass guitar, back-up vocals
- John Richardson – Drums

=== Production ===
- Mike Leach – Engineer
- Jonathan Pines – Mastering, mixing
- Adam Schmitt – Mastering

== Managerial and design ==
- Ed Morgan – Management
- Tommy Keene – Photography
- Marvin Forte – Graphic Design
