= World So Bright =

Studio album by Adam Schmitt
- Released: 1991
- Studios: Chicago Recording Company, Chicago, additional recording at Private Studios in Urbana and Schmitt's house in Champaign
- Genres: Pop, power pop
- Length: 44:58
- Label: Reprise
- Producers: Greg Edward, Adam Schmitt

Adam Schmitt chronology
World So Bright (1991)	Illiterature (1993)

World So Bright is the debut album by the American musician Adam Schmitt, released in 1991. Schmitt supported the album by opening for the BoDeans on a North American tour.

== Production ==
Recorded at Chicago Recording Company and in Schmitt's Champaign, Illinois, basement, the album was produced by Greg Edward and Schmitt. It contains contributions from Lisa Germano, Kenny Aronoff, John Richardson, and Jay Bennett. "Scarlet Street" addresses the problem of homelessness in the United States.

== Critical reception ==
Professional ratings
Review scores
Source	Rating
AllMusic	4/5 stars
Chicago Tribune	3.5/4 stars
The Record	3/4 stars
The Republican	2/5 stars
The Telegraph	3/4 stars

Trouser Press thought that the "well-crafted songs are mega-tuneful guitar-driven gems with hooks galore and lyrics that rise above the prosaic 'boy meets girl/boy loses girl/boy misses girl/boy goes looking for another girl' fodder." The Chicago Tribune determined that "the album's dozen songs resound with the innate humability that informs the best work of Squeeze, XTC and the dB's."

The Palm Beach Post wrote: "A hopeful romantic, [Schmitt] infuses love song after love song with memorable hooks. A tough, heartfelt delivery gives them an added edge." The Republican concluded that "it's pop alright, but the hooks don't hook and the thing don't swing." Rolling Stone called it "more than a promising debut, it's a confident piece of work from a canny singer-songwriter who's going to be around for a good long while."

AllMusic wrote that "things are less impressive when the amps get cranked too high ('River Black'), but fortunately that's not a frequent mistake, and one that's more than redeemed by songs like the wistful, touching ballad 'Elizabeth Einstein'." MusicHound Rock: The Essential Album Guide deemed the album "a flawless disc," writing that the title track is a "symmetrical diamond." In 2001, Goldmine labeled World So Bright "a pop manifesto to the max, brimming with catchy tunes delivered in a classic pop style."

== Track listing ==
All tracks are written by Adam Schmitt.

No.	Title	Length
1.	"Dead End"	3:35
2.	"World So Bright"	3:09
3.	"Can't Get You on My Mind"	3:28
4.	"River Black"	4:04
5.	"Lost"	3:36
6.	"Garden of Love"	4:13
7.	"My Killer"	4:01
8.	"Remembered Sun"	3:37
9.	"Everything Turned Blue"	3:33
10.	"Elizabeth Einstein"	3:48
11.	"Scarlet Street"	3:49
12.	"At Season's End"	4:06

== Personnel ==
- Adam Schmitt – All vocals and instruments except when noted

Additional musicians

- Kenny Aronoff – drums and percussion
- John Richardson – drums
- Lisa Germano – violin
- Jay Bennett – guitar solo on "Can't Get You on My Mind" and "Everything Turned Blue"
- Donna Delory – additional backing vocals on "River Black" and "Garden of Love"
- Julie Griffin – additional backing vocals on "River Black"
- Greg Edward – trumpet and percussion
- Michael Hill – handclaps on "At Season's End"

Production

- Adam Schmitt – producing, recording, mixing engineering
- Greg Edward – producing, recording, mixing
- Chris Shepard – engineering, mixing assistant
- Stephen Marcussen – mastering
- Kim Champagne – art direction, design
- Annalisa – photography
