= In the Late Bright =

Studio album by Tommy Keene
- Released: February 17, 2009
- Genre: Power pop
- Length: 38:39
- Label: Second Motion
- Producers: Tommy Keene, R. Walt Vincent

Tommy Keene chronology
Crashing the Ether (2006)	In the Late Bright (2009)	Behind the Parade (2011)

Professional ratings
Review scores
Source	Rating
AllMusic	4/5 stars

In the Late Bright is an album by Tommy Keene, released in 2009.

== Critical reception ==
The New Yorker called the album "another strong collection of power-pop compositions anchored by Keene's buzzing, insistent guitar." Paste wrote that "the weakness is that [Keene's] voice, hoarse and quite deliberate, tamps down the exuberance of his upbeat tracks, even when cushioned by harmony singing." The Oklahoman called the album "alt-pop near-perfection."

== Track listing ==
All songs written by Tommy Keene.

1. "Late Bright" – 2:16
2. "A Secret Life of Stories" – 3:52
3. "Save This Harmony" – 4:04
4. "Tomorrow's Gone Tonight" – 3:06
5. "Goodbye Jane" – 2:06
6. "Nightmare Crime Scene" – 4:44
7. "Elevated" – 4:55
8. "Realize Your Mind" – 2:52
9. "The Right Time to Fly" – 2:58
10. "Please Don't Come Around" – 3:36
11. "Hide Your Eyes" – 4:16

== Personnel ==
- Tommy Keene — Vocals, Guitars, Bass, keyboards
- R. Walt Vincent — keys tracks 3,5 and 6, loops and bass track 3, vocals track 6
- Brad Quinn — Bass track 4, vocals track 2, 8 and 9
- John Richardson — Drums

== Production ==
Recorded by Tommy Keene, R. Walt Vincent and Jonathan Pines

Tracks 1,2,8,9,10 mixed by Jonathan Pines at Private Studios, Urbana, IL Tracks 3,4,5,6,11 mixed by R. Walt Vincent at Mesmer, Culver City, CA Track 7 mixed by Tommy at home

Executive Producer - Keven Lane Keller Tracks 3 and 6 co-produced by R. Walt Vincent

Mastered by Louie Teran at Marcussen Mastering, Hollywood, CA Art By Jim Horan

Cover photos by Chris Rady, inside live photo by Burcu Uzer, all others by Tommy Keene
