= Ten Years After (Tommy Keene album) =

Studio album by Tommy Keene
- Released: February 27, 1996
- Genres: Power pop, rock
- Label: Matador

Tommy Keene chronology
Based on Happy Times (1989)	Ten Years After (1996)	Isolation Party (1998)

Ten Years After is Tommy Keene's fourth studio album, released in 1996. It was his first for Matador Records (Catalog #OLE 177).

== Production ==
The album was produced by Adam Schmitt.

== Critical reception ==
Professional ratings
Review scores
Source	Rating
AllMusic	4.5/5 stars
Chicago Tribune	3.5/4 stars
The Encyclopedia of Popular Music	4/5 stars
MusicHound Rock: The Essential Album Guide	4.5/5 stars

AllMusic called the album "a must for longtime fans, as well as anyone who appreciates intelligent and well-crafted pop/rock that maintains a sharp edge." Entertainment Weekly wrote that "Keene's smart lyrics and considerable melodic sense are intact but dated — the album is like a flower fossilized in amber." Washington City Paper wrote that the album "finds Keene fulfilling the romantic bard's duty to toy with emotional calamity; the result is a series of dispatches on the skimpy rewards of rekindling a relationship that was doomed from the get-go." CMJ New Music Monthly called it "a solid and inviting, relentlessly tuneful record."

== Track listing ==
All songs written by Tommy Keene, except where noted.

1. "Going Out Again" – 2:19
2. "Turning on Blue" – 4:16
3. "Today and Tomorrow" – 4:29
4. "Your Heart Beats Alone" – 4:03
5. "If You're Getting Married Tonight" – 2:21
6. "On the Runway" – 2:55
7. "We Started Over Again" – 3:14
8. "Silent Town" – 4:02
9. "Good Thing Going" – 2:54
10. "Compromise" – 3:03
11. "You Can't Wait for Time" – 2:11
12. "Before the Lights Go Down" – 3:57
13. "It's Not True" (Pete Townshend) – 1:28
  - Originally recorded by the Who in 1965, this song does not appear on the CD's or LP's track list.

== Personnel ==
The band

- Tommy Keene – vocals, guitar, keyboards
- Brad Quinn – bass, backing vocals
- John Richardson – drums, percussion

Additional musicians

- Adam Schmitt – bass guitar on "Silent Town", backing vocals on "Going Out Again" and "Compromise"
- Jay Bennett – guitar on "Turning on Blue" and "We Started Over Again"
- Justin Hibbard – guitar on "You Can't Wait for Time" and "Before the Lights Go Down"
- Eric Peterson – guitar on "Your Heart Beats Alone"
- Eric Heywood – pedal steel guitar on "If You're Getting Married Tonight"

Production

- Adam Schmitt – recording, mixing, mastering
- Jonathan Pines – mastering, assistant engineer
- Bob DeMaa – assistant engineer
- Steve Carr – recording, mixing

Additional credits

- Recorded, mixed and mastered at Private Studios, Urbana, Illinois, and Pachyderm, Cannon Falls, Minnesota
- Recorded and mixed at Hit and Run, Rockville, Maryland
- Tommy Keene – photography
- Arlene Elkins – photography (live shot)
- Mike Lundsgaard – photography (tube station)
- Tannis Root – art direction, design
