= Crashing the Ether =

Studio album by Tommy Keene
- Released: April 4, 2006
- Genres: Power pop, rock
- Label: Eleven Thirty

Tommy Keene chronology
The Merry-Go-Round Broke Down (2002)	Crashing the Ether (2006)	In the Late Bright (2009)

Professional ratings
Review scores
Source	Rating
Allmusic	4/5 stars
ARTISTdirect	4/5 stars
PopMatters	(mixed)
Stylus Magazine	C+

Crashing the Ether is the seventh album by Tommy Keene. Recorded at his home studio, Keene played most of the instruments himself; among others, John Richardson played drums and Gin Blossoms guitarist Jesse Valenzuela chipped in with some back-up vocals.

== Track listing ==
All songs written by Tommy Keene

1. "Black & White New York" – 4:56
2. "Warren in the '60s" – 3:26
3. "Quit That Scene" – 3:24
4. "Driving Down the Road in My Mind" – 5:28
5. "Wishing" – 4:15
6. "Lives Become Lies" – 5:08
7. "Eyes of Youth" – 3:45
8. "I've Heard That Wind Blow Before" – 3:35
9. "Alta Loma" – 4:13
10. "Texas Tower No.4" – 6:10

== Personnel ==
- Tommy Keene — Vocals, instrumentation

=== Additional musicians ===
- Brad Quinn — Bass guitar
- Jesse Valenzuela — Harmony vocals
- Steve Gerlach — Guitar
- Walter Vincent — Harmony vocals
- John Richardson — Drums
- R. Walt Vincent — Harmony vocals

=== Production ===
- Tommy Keene — Producer
- Walter Vincent — Producer, mixing
- R. Walt Vincent — Producer, mixing
- Jonathan Pines — Engineer, drum engineering
- Louie Teran — Mastering
- Kevin Lane Keller — Executive producer
- Chris Widmer — Engineer, drum engineering

== Additional credits ==
- Cary Baker — Publicity
- Jim Horan — Art direction
- Steve Curtis — Photography
- Tommy Keene — Photography
