= Stolen Wishes =

Studio album by Shoes
- Released: 1989
- Recorded: November 1988–September 1989
- Studios: Short Order, Zion, Illinois
- Genre: Power pop
- Label: Black Vinyl
- Producer: Shoes

Shoes chronology
Shoes Best (1987)	Stolen Wishes (1989)	Propeller (1994)

Stolen Wishes is an album by the American band Shoes. It was the band's first studio album since 1982 to be released in America. The album, an independent release, sold more than 20,000 copies in its first four months. "Feel the Way That I Do" appeared on the soundtrack to Mannequin Two: On the Move.

== Production ==
The album was recorded at the band's Short Order Recorder studio; the delay between albums was due to studio construction and label issues. Ric Menck, of Velvet Crush, plays drums on Stolen Wishes. Shoes' three principal band members each wrote five songs.

== Critical reception ==
Professional ratings
Review scores
Source	Rating
AllMusic	2/5 stars
Robert Christgau	B
The Encyclopedia of Popular Music	2/5 stars
The Rolling Stone Album Guide	3.5/5 stars
Select	3/5

The Washington Post wrote that "the music of these studio hermits ... remains as pure and sweet—bittersweet, actually—as such antecedents as the Hollies, the Beau Brummels, and of course the Beatles." Robert Christgau called the band "still hooky after all these years." The Chicago Tribune concluded that "the record celebrates craft rather than quirks, the primacy of melody and harmony rather than dance beats and gimmickry."

The Dallas Morning News determined that the band "continues its tireless pursuit of this thing called love while tossing out some of the most immediately affecting harmonies and melodies since that band from Liverpool." The San Francisco Chronicle opined that "Shoes sounds like classic American heartland rock that won't go away, no matter what." The Austin American-Statesman listed the album as the sixth best of 1990 (and the best independent release), describing it as "boy-girl songs with an older-and-wiser edge in a testament to the timelessness of hooks and harmonies."

AllMusic wrote that Shoes "appeared to have gotten over their collective distrust of keyboards, and the bright, punchy sound, peppy tempos, and frequent synthesizer washes of Stolen Wishes sound like a studied attempt at a more 'contemporary' sound from a band who seemed perfectly content to be slightly anachronistic a decade earlier." The Rolling Stone Album Guide determined that "the group's creamy harmonies, propulsive three-chord riffing and yearning choruses cut as deep as ever."

== Track listing ==
No.	Title	Writer(s)	Length
1.	"Feel the Way That I Do"	John Murphy	3:37
2.	"I'll Follow You"	Gary Klebe	3:56
3.	"Love Does"	Jeff Murphy	3:49
4.	"Let It Go"	John Murphy	3:52
5.	"Your Devotion"	Klebe	3:39
6.	"I Knew You'd Be Mine"	Jeff Murphy	4:01
7.	"Want You Bad"	Klebe	3:42
8.	"Torn in Two"	John Murphy	4:22
9.	"She's Not the Same"	Jeff Murphy	3:51
10.	"Untangled"	Klebe	3:46
11.	"I Don't Know Why"	Jeff Murphy	2:16
12.	"Inside of You"	John Murphy	2:39
13.	"I Can't Go Wrong"	Klebe	3:19
14.	"Love Is Like a Bullet"	Jeff Murphy	3:24
15.	"Never Had It Better"	John Murphy	3:39

== Personnel ==
Adapted from the album liner notes.

Shoes

- Gary Klebe – vocals, guitar, keyboards, engineer, production
- Jeff Murphy – vocals, guitar, keyboards, engineer, production
- John Murphy – vocals, bass, guitar, keyboards, design, production

Additional personnel

- Ric Menck – drums
- Phil Bonanno – mastering
- Chris Shepard – mastering assistant
- Randi Shepard – photography
- Creative Graphics – typography
