= Songs from the Film =

Studio album by Tommy Keene
- Released: 1986
- Genre: Power pop, rock
- Label: Geffen
- Producer: Geoff Emerick

Tommy Keene chronology
Strange Alliance (1981)	Songs from the Film (1986)	Based on Happy Times (1989)

Professional ratings
Review scores
Source	Rating
AllMusic	4/5 stars
Pitchfork Media	6/10
Rolling Stone	(positive)

Songs from the Film is Tommy Keene's second full-length album and his major label debut. Originally released on LP and cassette in 1986 (Geffen Records, catalog #GHS 24090), it wasn't available on CD until 1998.

The album hit No. 148 on the Billboard 200.

== Reception ==
Spin said producer "Emerick met the challenge of turning this popster of modest but real merit into a star by deflavorizing his tunes with a big production jab. The low-key charms of his songs are lost in a sea of ringing guitars, and one more record with a zillion shimmering arpeggios is not high on my list of things the world is in desperate need of."

== Track listing ==
All songs written by Tommy Keene, except where noted

1. "Places That Are Gone" – 2:53
2. "In Our Lives" – 2:59
3. "Listen to Me" – 3:52
4. "Paper Words and Lies" – 2:23
5. "Gold Town" – 2:57
6. "Kill Your Sons" – 5:02 (Lou Reed)
  - Originally recorded by Lou Reed, 1974
7. "Call on Me" – 3:04
8. "As Life Goes By" – 2:23
9. "My Mother Looked Like Marilyn Monroe" – 3:19
10. "Underworld" – 5:00
11. "Astronomy" – 1:28
12. "The Story Ends" – 3:48

Bonus tracks on the 1998 CD version

1. "Take Back Your Letters" – 4:24
  - Previously unreleased; Songs from the Film outtake
2. "Run Now" – 4:42
  - Originally released on the Run Now EP (Geffen, 1986)
3. "Away from It All" – 2:54
  - From Run Now
4. "I Don't Feel Right at All" – 3:42
  - From Run Now
5. "Back Again" – 4:03
  - From Run Now
6. "They're in Their Own World" – 3:45
  - From Run Now
7. "We're Two" – 3:20
  - Previously unreleased; recorded in 1984
8. "Faith in Love" (full band version) – 3:15
  - Previously unreleased; recorded in 1984
9. "Teenage Head" – 3:44 (Roy Loney, Cyril Jordan)
  - Originally recorded by Flamin' Groovies, 1971
  - Previously unreleased; recorded live-in-the-studio

note: On the CD, "Take Back Your Letters" appears between "Underworld" and "Astronomy"; the remainder of the bonus tracks follow "The Story Ends").

== Personnel ==
=== The band ===
- Tommy Keene — Vocals, guitars, keyboards, percussion
- Billy Connelly — Guitars, background vocals, lead guitar ("Teenage Head")
- Ted Niceley — Bass guitar
- Doug Tull — Drums

=== Production ===
- Geoff Emerick — Producer, mixing ("Places That Are Gone", "Listen to Me", "Gold Town", "Call on Me", "As Life Goes By", "Underworld", "Astronomy", "The Story Ends")
- Matt Butler — Engineer, mixing ("Places That Are Gone", "Listen to Me", "Gold Town", "Call on Me", "As Life Goes By", "Underworld", "Astronomy", "The Story Ends")
- Frank Oglethorpe — Technical assistance, second engineer
- Bill Wittman — Mixing ("In Our Lives", "Paper Words and Lies", "Kill Your Sons", "My Mother Looked Like Marilyn Monroe")
- John Agnello — Mixing ("In Our Lives", "Paper Words and Lies", "Kill Your Sons", "My Mother Looked Like Marilyn Monroe")
- Tom Zutaut — Production assistance
- George Marino — Mastering
- Jeff Magio — Executive producer (CD version)
- Josh Grier — Executive producer (CD version)
- Bob Clearmountain — Producer ("Run Now")
- T-Bone Burnett — Producer ("Away from It All", "I Don't Feel Right at All", "Back Again", "They're in Their Own World", "We're Two", "Faith in Love")
- Don Dixon — Producer ("Away from It All", "I Don't Feel Right at All", "Back Again", "They're in Their Own World", "We're Two", "Faith in Love")
- David Donnelly — CD remastering

== Additional credits ==
- Recorded at AIR Studios, Montserrat, West Indies
- Recorded at Bearsville Studios, Woodstock, New York
- Mixed at AIR Studios, Montserrat ("Places That Are Gone", "Listen to Me", "Gold Town", "Call on Me", "As Life Goes By", "Underworld", "Astronomy", "The Story Ends")
- Mixed at The Record Plant, New York City ("In Our Lives", "Paper Words and Lies", "Kill Your Sons", "My Mother Looked Like Marilyn Monroe")
- "Thank you Teresa Ensenat, Tom Zutaut, Bobby Keene, Ed Rosenblatt, Pat Day, Joe Picuri, Jim Crence, Josh Rowley, Yvonne Kelly and all at AIR Studios, Montserrat, Dody Bowers, Josh Grier, Don Dixon, Steve Carr, Big Joe"
- Tom Zutaut — A&R
- Teresa Ensenat — A&R
- Mastered at Sterling Sound, New York City
- Michael Hodgson — Art direction and design
- Jeffrey Kent Ayeroff — Art direction and design
- Just Loomis — Photography
- Terry Robertson — CD design
- Tommy Keene — Additional photography (CD)
- "With thanks to the National Building Museum and Union Station Redevelopment Corporation, Washington, D.C."
- CD thanks: "Tommy wishes to thank: Josh Grier, Jeff Magid, Bobby Keene and Ed Morgan", "Special thanks: Bill Bennett, David Berman, Brit Davis, Lyn Fey, Dave Garbarino, Kristin Hambsch, Julie Hall, Rich Hyland, Greg Lapidus, Clark Pardee, Mel Posner, Ed Rosenblatt, Robin Rothman, Jennifer Schiller, Annie B. Siegel, Robert Smith, Jim Walker, Jason Whittington"
- CD liner notes — John M. Borack

== Alternate versions ==
In 1998, Geffen released Songs from the Film on CD (catalog #GEFD-25225) with nine bonus tracks.

== Sources ==
- LP and CD liner notes
