= Han Nolan =

American writer of young adult fiction (born 1956)

Han Nolan (born August 25, 1956) is an American writer of young adult fiction. She has published nine young adult novels. She won the U.S. National Book Award for Young People's Literature in 1997 for the novel Dancing on the Edge.

== Bibliography ==
- If I Should Die Before I Wake (1994)
- Send Me Down a Miracle (1996)
- Dancing on the Edge (1997)
- A Face in Every Window (1999)
- Born Blue (2000)
- When We Were Saints (2003)
- A Summer of Kings (2006)
- Crazy (2010)
- Pregnant Pause (2011)
