= Richard X. Heyman =

American singer-songwriter and musician

Richard X. Heyman (born 1951) is an American singer-songwriter and musician. Heyman is a founding member of the Doughboys.

== Biography ==
Heyman was born in 1951 and raised in Plainfield, New Jersey. He started banging on things when he was five, got a full drum kit when he was seven, and was an accomplished drummer by the time he was twelve. He picked up guitar and piano in his teens, which was also when he began writing songs. He was one of the original members of the 60s group, The Doughboys, who are considered to be a legendary New Jersey garage rock band. He would later go solo, in his twenties, following the breakup of the original Doughboys.

In 1978, Heyman and Tommy Keene collaborated in a short-lived Washington, D.C.-area group called the Rage. Mark Jenkins of The Washington Post described the Rage as "a promising band [...] that, despite its name, was more pop than punk." Kim Kane of The Slickee Boys referred to the Rage as "the better of the best power pop bands in either the U.S. or the U.K. Live, they had a tight, three-part harmony Mersey(or Potomac?)-beat [sic] pop sound, look, and intensity." According to Kane, the Rage split up due to the "usual inter-business-bull and inter-band blade-switching," with Keene departing to join The Razz, before going on to a lengthy solo career.

Heyman's influences are as varied as Bernstein to The Beatles, Richard Rodgers to the Rascals, and the Blues to The Byrds. He has drummed for such artists as Brian Wilson, Link Wray, Jonathan Richman and the Left Banke's Michael Brown, composer of "Walk Away Renee". He also played keyboards for the legendary Ben E. King and guitar for the lead singer of The Shangri-Las, Mary Weiss. In live performance, Richard leads his own band on guitar and keyboards.

From 2000-2019, Heyman played with the re-united Doughboys as their drummer and contributing songwriter. He and his wife, Nancy, live in Manhattan.

== Discography ==
Heyman released his first indie EP, Actual Size, a collection of six of his finest songs recorded on an 8-track Tascam machine in a home studio, in 1987, the same studio in which Richard would subsequently record his album Living Room!!, released in 1988.

=== Albums ===
- Living Room!! (1988)
- Hey Man! (1990)
- Cornerstone (1998)
- Basic Glee (2002)
- Rightovers (2003)
- Actual Sighs (2007)
- Intakes (2009)
- Tiers and Other Stories (2011)
- X (2013)
- Y (2014)
- Incognito (2017)
- Pop Circles (2019)
- Copious Notes (2021)
- 67,000 Miles An Album (2022)

=== EP's ===
- Actual Size (1986)
- Heyman, Hoosier & Herman (2001)

=== Singles ===
- Vacation" b/w "Takin' My Chances (1980)

=== Others ===
As a composer, Heyman is co-writer of "My Love for You" on track 3 of Smokey Robinson & the Miracles, The Tears of a Clown (1970). The song also appears on track 4 of Ramsey Lewis' Funky Serenity (1973).
