= Adam Schmitt =

American singer

Adam Schmitt (born June 16, 1968) is a singer/songwriter from Urbana, Illinois. He recorded two albums, World So Bright and Illiterature with Reprise Records in the early 1990s. He recorded albums in his Mixolydian Studios, working with artists such as Hum and Uncle Tupelo. He released his third album, Demolition, in 2001 after signing with Parasol Records, and continues to record and produce albums for other artists, including Velvet Crush, Three Hour Tour, Robynn Ragland, and Destroy The Heart (featuring Darren Robbins). He has worked with Tommy Keene, Eric Voeks, Richard Lloyd, Common Loon, Megan Johns, Unbunny, The Dirty Feathers, Elsinore, The Hathaways, and Shipwreck.

On June 24, 2016, former Cheap Trick drummer Bun E. Carlos released his first solo CD; Greetings from Bunezuela. Schmitt contributed to the effort and is listed in the credits as 'mixer' (along with Rick Barnes).

== Discography ==
- World So Bright (Reprise, 1991)
- Illiterature (Reprise, 1993)
- Demolition (Parasol, 2001)
