= Cornerstone (Richard X. Heyman album) =

Studio album by Richard X. Heyman
- Released: 1998
- Genre: Rock, power pop
- Label: Permanent Press
- Producer: Richard X. Heyman

Richard X. Heyman chronology
Hey Man! (1991)	Cornerstone (1998)	Heyman, Hoosier and Herman (2000)

Cornerstone is an album by the American musician Richard X. Heyman, released in 1998. It was Heyman's first album in almost seven years.

== Production ==
The album was produced by Heyman. He was joined by his wife, Nancy Leigh, on bass, and Andy Resnick on guitar, although Heyman played the majority of the instruments.

Cornerstone was finished in 1996—one of several albums Heyman recorded after being dropped by Sire Records—but not released until 1998. Heyman financed the album himself, selling many of his vintage guitars to do so.

== Critical reception ==
Professional ratings
Review scores
Source	Rating
AllMusic	4.5/5 stars
Lincoln Journal Star	5/5 stars
Los Angeles Daily News	3/4 stars
MusicHound Rock: The Essential Album Guide	3.5/5 stars
Orange County Register	4.5/5 stars
The Republican	4/5 stars

Trouser Press wrote that "Cornerstone contains one heartbroken song for the ages, the rushing 'Out of My Hands', and others of nearly equal distinction." The Washington Post thought that "the album sounds overdone, multi-tracked relentlessly with keyboards, synthesized strings and background choirs; such songs as 'When She Arrives' are polished to such a gleam that they sound as if they're designed for '80s Top 40 radio." The Republican deemed it "a bright blend of Phil Spector production values with clear, '60s-styled melodies."

The Lincoln Journal Star determined that, "instead of being sucked into a game of Name That Influence, the listener gets washed away in the pure glory of Heyman's pop without much noticing, or caring, about its antecedents." Stereo Review opined that "Heyman sings in a dusky midrange burr reminiscent of Gene Clark's, and his songs unfurl with a minor-key, folk-rockish urgency." The Philadelphia Inquirer called Heyman "a tragically under-recognized pop genius." The News & Observer concluded that "even the potentially cheesy flourishes—the vibe solo outro of 'The Drone Song', the harpsichord to 'When It Was Our Time', the stupid guitar riffing on 'Tidal Wave'—are so well-done they work perfectly."

AllMusic wrote that Heyman "continued to demonstrate how rewarding power-pop and jangly guitar rock can be."

== Track listing ==
No.	Title	Length
1.	"Cornerstone"
2.	"All I Have"
3.	"If We Should Ever Meet Again"
4.	"Racing After You"
5.	"Everything the Same"
6.	"Tidal Wave"
7.	"When She Arrives"
8.	"The Drone Song"
9.	"From This Day Forever"
10.	"Ask Anyone Who's Tried"
11.	"Out of My Hands"
12.	"When It Was Our Time"
13.	"On You"
14.	"Clear to Me Now"
