= Strange Alliance =

Studio album by Tommy Keene
- Released: 1982
- Genre: Power pop
- Label: Avenue
- Producer: Ted Niceley, Tommy Keene

Tommy Keene chronology
Strange Alliance (1982)	Songs from the Film (1986)

Professional ratings
Review scores
Source	Rating
Allmusic	2/5 stars

Strange Alliance is the debut album by Tommy Keene and was self-released on LP in 1982 on his Avenue Records label (catalog #AVE 001). Initially slated for release on Skip Groff's Limp Records, it still carries the Limp catalog number (LIMP 1010) in the run-out groove of the vinyl. Keene's band line-up would remain the same until he moved to Los Angeles following the release of his major label debut, Songs from the Film, in 1986. In addition, a former bandmate of bassist Ted Niceley's from Nightman, Mike Colburn (who had also been an early member of (The) Razz), contributes backing vocals on three songs.

In 2013, 12XU Records, run by Gerard Cosloy, reissued Strange Alliance on LP in a limited edition run with two bonus tracks not on the original release, "Nothing Is Gray" and "Stuck on a Ship".

== Track listing ==
All songs written by Tommy Keene

1. "Landscape" – 3:40
2. "All the Way Around" – 4:32
3. "Don't Get Me Wrong" – 3:42
4. "I Can't See You Anymore" – 3:36
5. "It's All Happening Today" – 4:43
6. "Strange Alliance" – 4:25
7. "Another Night at Home" – 2:50
8. "Northern Lights" – 4:59

2013 reissue track listing:

1. "Landscape" – 3:40
2. "All the Way Around" – 4:32
3. "Nothing Is Gray" -
4. "Don't Get Me Wrong" – 3:42
5. "I Can't See You Anymore" – 3:36
6. "It's All Happening Today" – 4:43
7. "Strange Alliance" – 4:25
8. "Stuck On A Ship" - 4:28
9. "Another Night at Home" – 2:50
10. "Northern Lights" – 4:59

== Personnel ==
=== The band ===
- Tommy Keene — Vocals, guitar, keyboards, "[a]ll instruments on "Northern Lights""
- Ted Niceley — Bass guitar, percussion
- Doug Tull — Drums
- Michael Colburn — Harmony vocals ("Don't Get Me Wrong", "I Can't See You Anymore", "Another Night at Home")

=== Production ===
- Ted Niceley — Producer
- Tommy Keene — Producer
- Jim Crenca — Engineer
- Mark Greenhouse — Engineer
- Robert Ludwig — Mastering

== Additional credits ==
- Recorded at Track Recorders, Silver Spring, Maryland
- Mastered at Masterdisk
- Roger G. Williams — Graphics design
- Stephen Figliozzi — Photography
- Skip Groff — Album coordinator
- Peter C. Leeds — Manager (American Entertainment Management, New York City)
- Seth Hurwitz — Booking
- David Einstein — Liner notes
