= Gar Francis =

American singer-songwriter

Gar Francis is an American singer-songwriter.

== Biography ==
Gar Francis grew up in North Plainfield, New Jersey in the early sixties. Francis started playing the guitar at an early age, By the 1970s, he formed a New Jersey base band called The Rockids, who were regulars at CBGB's and Max's Kansas City in Manahattan, NY. In the 1980s Francis wrote a song called "Baby, It's You" for the band Ricochet. Francis also did session work as a guitar player on Billy Idol's recorded version of "Mony, Mony". Francis joined Sticky Fingers, a Rolling Stones Tribute band.

In 2005, Francis began writing and playing guitar for the 60s garage rock band The Doughboys (New Jersey) on their album called "Is It Now?" Francis produced the hit single "Black Sheep", which was voted No. 2 "Coolest Song In The World for 2008" on Little Steven's Underground Garage. Francis officially became a member of The Doughboys at about this time. Gar continue to write and produce his own original songs. His single called "Rocket" was written as a tribute for those serving in the U.S. Armed Forces. It because a hit when he perform it in front of men and women at Ft. Dix, NJ.

The Doughboys' second CD Act Your Rage produced another hit single called "I’m Not Your Man", which Little Steven's Underground Garage picked for "Coolest Song In The World" the week of September 5, 2009. It was voted by the station's listeners as "#3 Coolest Song In The World" for 2009.

In 2012, Francis participated in the creation of two songs which appeared in the indie film Fairhaven which premiered at the 2012 Tribeca Film Festival. The songs were "Turn Your Love On Me" by The Doughboys (New Jersey) and "The Bank Of The River" from Francis' Americana album The More Things Change, The More They Stay Same.

As of 2013, Francis continued to write songs for independent artists under the Bongo Boy Records label including The Easy Outs, Jana Peri, Jean Lozier Genya Ravan, Kelly Caruso, a Mississippi Delta juke joint band The Groundhawgs, as well as a bluesman by the name of Plainfield Slim. and Mark Lindsay

In 2014, Francis joined the group The Satisfactors, who released an album The Satisfactors on Bongo Boys Records.

== Discography ==
=== Full albums ===
- Queen Of Your Dreams – Jeanne Lozier with Gar Francis- 2005
- Another Mule in the Barn – Plainfield Slim- 2006
- Is It Now? – The Doughboys – 2008
- When The Devil Hits Home – Plainfield Slim & The Groundhagws – 2009
- Act Your Rage – The Doughboys – 2009
- Rock N' Raw – The Doughboys live with Gar Francis – 2011
- Love & Protest – Gar Francis – 2011
- Bootleg Volume One – Gar Francis −2011
- The More Things Change The More They Stay The Same – Gar Francis – 2011
- Shine On ( EP ) Gar Francis 2012
- Take It Or Leave It – A Tribute to the Queen Of Noise – The Easy Outs with Gar Francis 2011
- Under The Influence of Christmas – Santa Make Me Good – The Grip Weeds with Gar Francis

=== Compilation albums ===
- Red Hot Blues – United Blues Network 2004
- Urban Legends of NJ – United Jersey Blues Network 2006
- the ARS Sessions – Plainfield Slim & The Groundhawgs
- Little Steven Underground Garage Vol. 7 – The Doughboys with Gar Francis 2008
- American Roots Live Presents – The Studio Masters 2009

=== Singles ===
- Baby It Is You – Ricochet 1981
- Dance – Ricochet 1981
- Mony Mony – Billy Idol with Gar Francis July 1982
- Black Sheep – The Doughboys – 2008
- I'm Not A Man – The Doughboys – 2009
- Rocket – Gar Francis – 2009
- Ballerina of the Bowery – Jana Peri – 2010
- Come On, Come On – The Easy Outs – 2010
- I Won't Cry Anymore – Genya Ravan – 2011
- Lady Gaga – The Swinging Iggies – 2011
- Let's Have A Rockin Christmas – Jackie Kringle & The Elves – 2011
- Born Dainty – Kelly Caruso – 2012
