= The Doughboys (American band) =

American rock band

- Also known as: The Ascots
- Origin: Plainfield, New Jersey, United States
- Genres: Garage rock; rock; R&B
- Years active: 1965–1968; 2000–present
- Labels: Ram Records
- Members: Mike Caruso; Richard X. Heyman; Myke Scavone; Gar Francis
- Past members: Mike Farina; Willy Kirchofer
- Website: thedoughboysnj.com

The Doughboys are an American rock band from Plainfield, New Jersey, United States, who were active in the mid-1960s, and re-formed in 2000. They have been active ever since, and have cut three albums of newly recorded material since their reunion.

== History ==
=== 1960s ===
The band originally formed when three members of the Ascots, Richard X. Heyman (drums), Mike Caruso (bass), and Willy Kirchofer (guitar) were joined by two members of the Apollos, Myke Scavone (vocals, harp), and Mike Farina (guitar). The group initially kept the name, the Ascots. From 1965 through 1968 they were considered the top band in Central New Jersey. Their repertoire consisted mostly of covers of groups like the Yardbirds, the Kinks, the Animals, and the Rolling Stones. The group played school dances and opened for acts such as Henny Youngman, the Hassles (with Billy Joel), and the Vagrants (with Leslie West).

In 1966 the Ascots appeared on John Zacherle's Disc-O-Teen television show several times competing in a year-long battle of the bands contest. The Ascots won the contest, and first prize was a recording contract with Bell Records. Prior to making their first recording, the Ascots changed their name to the Doughboys. The band's two singles, "Rhoda Mendelbaum" and "Everybody Knows My Name" (written by Bob Gaudio), were produced by the Jerome Brothers, who would later go on to produce the Left Banke. Both singles were released on the Bell Records label but failed to chart. Around this same time, the group began to perform in World War I "doughboy" uniforms that they had purchased at a vintage clothing store in the East Village.

After releasing "Rhoda Mendelbaum", the Doughboys performed on WMCA Good Guys weekend shows around New York City with artists such as Neil Diamond, the Fifth Dimension, the Syndicate of Sound, and the Music Explosion. Around this time the group also opened a show for the Beach Boys and the Buckinghams. The Doughboys had developed a grand finale for their shows that consisted of a rousing rendition of "Bo Diddley", where Heyman and Scavone would set up floor toms at the front of the stage and play them ferociously using maracas instead of drumsticks. As the song reached its climax, the two Doughboys would each pick up their floor tom and throw them together in mid-air for a dramatic end to the show. The day of the Beach Boy/Buckingham show, the group realized that they had neglected to bring one of their floor toms along with them. After asking the Buckinghams to borrow a floor tom and being turned down, the group asked the Beach Boys, who agreed. During the Doughboys' finale, Beach Boy Dennis Wilson happened to spot his floor tom being ridden like a horse by Myke Scavone. Furious, Wilson rushed the stage, tackled Scavone, and the set ended with Scavone and Wilson trading punches in front of a shocked audience. Wilson later apologized, and admitted that he was upset because his brother, Carl, was about to be arrested for draft evasion.

In 1967 the group decided to drop the rhythm guitar from their line-up and dismissed Mike Farina. By 1968, with the rise in popularity of groups such as Cream and the Jimi Hendrix Experience, the Doughboys dropped Myke Scavone from the group and focused on playing long instrumental music. In the summer of 1968, the three-man Doughboys were the house band at the famous Cafe Wha? in Greenwich Village. By the end of 1968, the original Doughboys broke up.

=== Later developments ===
Post-Doughboys, Scavone, Caruso, and Heyman played briefly together in Cool Heat in 1969. Kirchofer played with Jake and the Family Jewels. Kirchofer and Heyman were reunited briefly in the Quinaimes Band in 1973. Scavone worked briefly with Bo Gentry and Richie Cordell, released two singles on Epic Records as a solo artist, sang background vocals on a Ben Vereen album, and did session work as a drummer for producers Kasenetz and Katz.

Richard X Heyman played drums for artists such as Link Wray and Brian Wilson. On the strength of a self-released album, Living Room, Seymour Stein signed Heyman to a deal with Sire Records/Warner Bros. Records where he recorded as Richard X Heyman. Heyman continues to record as a solo artist.

Myke Scavone would eventually go on to front the group, Ram Jam, who had a hit record with the song, "Black Betty". Although Scavone was not on the recording of the song, he was recruited to front the group shortly after it was released and appears in a video of the song. In 2015 Scavone was recruited to play harmonica, percussion and backing vocals with his longtime heroes, the Yardbirds. He continues to tour with them in 2016. Mike Caruso did session work as a bassist for Kenny Laguna and Bo Gentry. Willy Kirchofer continued to play with bands around the Central New Jersey area. Mike Farina moved to California, where he got into television production.

=== Reunion ===
In 2000, for Richard X Heyman's birthday, his wife Nancy organized a surprise Doughboys reunion. With Myke Scavone manning the drums in rehearsal, he, Mike Caruso, and Willy Kirchofer worked up a group of songs based on their old repertoire. Mike Farina was living in California and was not able to participate. The "surprise" show went so well that the group again began playing shows around Central New Jersey and New York City. In 2005, Willy Kirchofer died. After much consideration, the band added guitarist, Gar Francis. Gar Francis was also from Plainfield, New Jersey and, although a few years younger, had listened to and admired the older Doughboys when he was in high school. Gar Francis had played with Kirchofer, and had also done session work, most notably playing guitar on Billy Idol's version of "Mony, Mony". Gar Francis is a prolific songwriter, who also has a solo career playing as Plainfield Slim and had released two full albums prior as Plainfield Slim; Another Mule In The Barn and as Plainfield Slim & The Groundhawgs; When The Devil Hits Home. At his urging, the band began to incorporate an increasing number of original songs into their shows. Songs written by Gar Francis, Gar Francis and Myke Scavone, and by Richard X. Heyman, who is also a prolific songwriter, increasingly became staples of the band's live sets and developed into crowd favorites.

The Doughboys released their first full-length recording, Is It Now? in November 2007. The CD was a mix of cover songs from the group's 1960s incarnation and originals written by Gar Francis, Richard X. Heyman, and Myke Scavone. Willy Kirchofer also appeared, posthumously on some of the cover songs using guitar tracks that he had recorded with the group while he was still alive. Two songs from the CD, "Black Sheep", and "Out Of The Night" received extensive airplay on Little Steven Van Zandt's Underground Garage radio station. "Black Sheep" was ultimately picked as the No. 2 Coolest Song of 2008 by listeners of the station. The CD received strong reviews in such publications as USA Today, Performing Songwriter, and Goldmine. The group continued to play live, headlining venues such as the Stone Pony, and opening for groups like The Pretenders, Catpower, and Robin Trower.

In January 2010, the group released its second full-length recording, Act Your Rage. The CD featured mostly original songs, again written by Gar Francis, Richard X. Heyman, and Myke Scavone. Kirchofer's guitar was again featured on a cover of "It's Alright". The lead off single, "I'm Not Your Man", was chosen as the No. 3 Coolest Song of 2009 by the listeners of Little Steven's Underground Garage, and the second single, "Why Can't She See Me?", was chosen as the first Coolest Song In The World This Week for 2010 by the station.

On October 17, 2010—to mark a whole decade back together – The Doughboys performed a set for a select group of friends and fans at Arlene Grocery in New York City (the site of their first reunion show in 2000), which was captured by cinematographer Rob Adams and producer/engineer Kurt Reil. The resulting DVD/CD package was Rock N’ Raw – a documentary of that show, accompanied by interviews with the band and archival footage. Extras on the DVD include interviews with such important figures from The Doughboys’ history as John Zacherle (the "Cool Ghoul") and clips of The Doughboys traversing their home turf of Plainfield, NJ and revisiting landmark rock’n’roll sites in New York City, such as the Café Wha? on MacDougall Street, where they were the house band in the summer of 1968.

In November 2012, The Doughboys released their third studio album Shakin' Our Souls. The track "It's A Cryin' Shame" was named "coolest song in the world" on Sirius/XM Underground Garage. The album features guest performances by Mark Lindsay (of Paul Revere & The Raiders fame) and Genya Ravan. It is the first Doughboys release to showcase only original material, written by Richard X. Heyman, Gar Francis and Myke Scavone. The album was warmly received by radio and press, with Springsteen guitarist and Underground Garage honcho Little Steven Van Zandt naming it his favorite album for all of 2012.

== Band members ==
Current members

- Richard X. Heyman - drums (1965–1968, 2000–present)
- Myke Scavone - lead vocals, harmonica, percussion (1965–1968, 2000–present)
- Mike Caruso - bass guitar (1965–1968, 2000–present)
- Gar Francis - lead and rhythm guitar (2005–present)

Former members

- Willy Kirchofer - lead guitar (1965–1968, 2000–2005), rhythm guitar (1967–1968, 2000–2005)
- Mike Farina - rhythm guitar (1965–1967)

== Discography ==
=== Studio albums ===
Year	Album
2007	Is It Now?
2010	Act Your Rage
2012	Shakin' Our Souls
2015	Hot Beat Stew

=== Live albums ===
Year	Album
2011	Rock N' Raw
