= Shoes (American band) =

1970s rock band from Illinois

- Origin: Zion, Illinois, United States
- Genres: Rock, power pop
- Years active: 1974–present
- Labels: Black Vinyl Records, Bomp!, Elektra
- Members: John Murphy; Jeff Murphy; Gary Klebe
- Past members: Barry Shumaker; Skip Meyer; Ric Menck; John Richardson; Jeff Hunter; Leroy Bocchieri
- Website: shoeswire.com

Shoes is an American rock band formed in Zion, Illinois in 1974. The group's musical style is influenced by British Invasion groups of the 1960s and has often been described as "power pop". The group was founded by the brothers John and Jeff Murphy and Gary Klebe, later adding Skip Meyer.

Shoes formed their own record label, Black Vinyl Records in 1977, and later recorded three albums for Elektra Records. With the debut of MTV in August 1981, Shoes were one of the first groups to be shown on the music video channel.

The group also owned and operated their own recording studio, Short Order Recorder, from 1983 to 2004. Many other artists also recorded at the studio and some went on to sign major label recording contracts, including Local H and Material Issue.

== History ==
=== 1970s ===
The Murphy brothers and Klebe were high school friends and decided to form a band following graduation. At the time none of the members knew how to play an instrument. Each member picked one and promised to reunite within a year. John Murphy took up bass, while Jeff Murphy and Gary Klebe learned guitar. The three quickly began to write and rehearse original songs.

A formalist's delight—the three principals pursue their theme of Sad Love as obsessively as a cavalier writing sonnets to his lady. Their voices are interchangeably breathy, their tempos unflappably moderate, their guitar hooks unfailingly right. And when for a change of pace one of them sounds bitter the effect is as startling as a Johnny Ramone guitar solo.

— Review of Present Tense in Christgau's Record Guide: Rock Albums of the Seventies (1981)

Between 1974 and 1976 the group made a series of home recordings which had very limited circulation, sometimes including drummer Barry Shumaker. By 1977 the group had added a permanent drummer Skip Meyer. The same year they also recorded the album Black Vinyl Shoes in the Murphy family living room. The band used a consumer grade 4-track reel-to-reel machine made by TEAC. They had 1,000 copies pressed on their own Black Vinyl Records label, and sold it at local record stores and by mail order through Bomp! magazine.

Shoes then entered a professional studio for the first time and released a single "Tomorrow Night" on Bomp! Records in June 1978. The following November Black Vinyl Shoes was licensed to PVC Records, which re-issued the album to national distribution in the US. It was also released in the UK by Sire Records.

The group signed to Elektra in April 1979 and released their first major label album, Present Tense, that September. The album was produced by Mike Stone at The Manor Studio in Oxfordshire, England. It peaked at number 50 on the Billboard 200 and yielded the minor hit single "Too Late" which reached number 75 on the Billboard Hot 100 and lasted 5 weeks on the chart. The album also included a new recording of "Tomorrow Night" which Elektra later released as a single.

=== 1980s and 1990s ===
When MTV went on the air on August 1, 1981, the channel aired four of Shoes' videos: "Too Late", "Tomorrow Night", "Cruel You" and "In My Arms Again", making Shoes one of the first bands to be shown on the channel.

Elektra released the follow-up studio albums Tongue Twister in 1981 and Boomerang in 1982. The label also released a limited edition promotional only 12" live EP titled Shoes on Ice in 1982. After leaving Elektra the band continued to record for their own label. Shoes did three more videos: "In Her Shadow" (1982), "When Push Comes to Shove" (1985) and "Feel the Way That I Do" (1991).

Skip Meyer left the group by 1984. He was eventually replaced by a series of other drummers including Ric Menck, John Richardson and Jeff Hunter.

=== 2000s ===
The Shoes song "Your Very Eyes" was covered by Jeffrey Foskett on his 2000 album Twelve and Twelve.

In early 2007, the band released a double CD titled Double Exposure, which contains demos of their songs from the albums Present Tense and Tongue Twister. In the same time frame, Jeff Murphy published a book entitled Birth of a Band, the Record Deal and the Recording of Present Tense, which documents the band's inception and early successes. In January 2007 Jeff released a solo album titled Cantilever.

=== 2010s ===
In January 2011 Shoes got together in the studio with drummer John Richardson to lay down rhythm tracks for a new batch of Shoes songs. Over the next 14 months recording continued on what would become their first studio album of new material in over 17 years. Released in mid-2012, Ignition adds to a career that spans more than four decades, giving the band the milestone of releasing music in each of the decades 1970s, 1980s, 1990s, 2000s and 2010s.

On July 9, 2014, Skip Meyer died. He was 64 years old.

== Name ==
The group's name was not inspired by a February 1964 interview with John Lennon where he said The Beatles could have been named "The Shoes". John Murphy said "I guess Shoes just sounded right... like 'look at those cool shoes' or 'where are my shoes?' ... it was like Sparks or Wings or Faces or even Big Star... The first time we heard the 'the' was from a writer...we winced and corrected him. 'No, no…it's just Shoes.' ... 'The Shoes' just rubbed us wrong.

== Discography ==
=== Albums ===
Year	Title	Label	Notes
1974	Heads or Tails	private release	Limited 4 copies - acetate disc LP
1975	One in Versailles	private release	LP
1976	Bazooka	private release	Cass
1977	Black Vinyl Shoes	Black Vinyl (BV10092); PVC; Sire (UK)	CD, LP
1979	Present Tense	Elektra	LP, Cass
1981	Tongue Twister	Elektra	LP, Cass
1982	Boomerang	Elektra	LP, Cass
1984	Silhouette	New Rose (France); Demon (England); Line (Germany); Black Vinyl (BV15191)	CD, LP, Cass
1987	Shoes Best	Black Vinyl (BV19787)	CD
1988	Present Tense / Tongue Twister	Black Vinyl (BV19888)	CD, Cass. Re-issue
1989	Stolen Wishes	Black Vinyl (BV10189); New Rose (France); VC (Japan)	CD, LP
1990	Boomerang / Shoes on Ice	Black Vinyl (BV18190)	CD Re-issue
1994	Propeller	Black Vinyl (BV10294)	CD
1995	Fret Buzz (live)	Black Vinyl (BV10495)	CD
1997	As-Is	Black Vinyl (BV10596)	Double CD (re-issue of One In Versailles, Bazooka and other rarities)
2007	Cantilever	Black Vinyl (BV10101)	Jeff Murphy solo CD
2007	Double Exposure	Black Vinyl (BV11979)	Double CD (Present Tense & Tongue Twister demos)
2012	Ignition	Black Vinyl (BV16112-2)	CD, MP3 (First all-new album in 18 years)
2012	35 Years: The Definitive Shoes Collection 1977-2012	Real Gone Music (RGM-0091)	CD (Compilation)
2012	Pre-Tense: Demos 1978-1979	Numero (JR 004)	LP
2015	Primal Vinyl	Alive Naturalsound Records (Alive0170-1)	Star-burst colored Vinyl LP (12-song compilation includes early demos and unreleased live track from 2013 tour)
2018	Black Vinyl Shoes Anthology 1973-1978	Cherry Red Records (CRCDBOX60)	3-CD box set (Black Vinyl Shoes, Bazooka, One in Versailles, plus demos and rarities)
2020	Elektrafied: The Elektra Years 1979-1982	Cherry Red Records (QCRCDBOX91)	4-CD box set (Present Tense, Tongue Twister, Boomerang, plus demos, rarities, and Shoes on Ice)

=== Singles and EPs ===
Year	Title	Label	Notes
1978	"Tomorrow Night" / "Okay"	Bomp (Bomp116)	7" single
1979	"Too Late" / "Now And Then"	Elektra E-46557	7" single
1979	"Tomorrow Night" (re-recorded version) / "Now And Then"	Elektra E-46571	7" single
1982	Shoes on Ice	Elektra AS-11570	12" EP
1995	"Tore a Hole"	Black Vinyl (BV10395)	CD

=== Tracks on compilations ===
Year	Album title	Shoes Track	Label	Notes
1978	The Best of Bomp Volume One	"Tomorrow Night"	Bomp!	
1989	Everyday Is a Holly Day	"Words Of Love"	New Rose (France); Emergo (EMD9465)	Buddy Holly tribute CD
1991	Yuletunes	"This Christmas"	Black Vinyl (BV12591)	Christmas CD
1993	Shake It Up! – American Power Pop II (1978–80)	"Tomorrow Night" "Too Late"	Rhino	
1993	Yellow Pills, Volume One	"I Miss You"	Big Deal (9003)	American Pop CD
1994	Yellow Pills, Volume Two	"Thing of the Past"	Big Deal (9006)	American Pop CD
1996	The Roots of Powerpop!	"Tomorrow Night"	Bomp! (BCD4060)	
