= Born Blue =

2001 US young adult novel by Han Nolan

- First edition
- Author: Han Nolan
- Language: English
- Genre: Young adult novel
- Publisher: Houghton Mifflin Harcourt
- Publication date: 2001
- Publication place: United States
- Media type: Print (hardback & paperback)
- Pages: 277 pp
- ISBN: 978-0-15-204697-2

Born Blue is a 2001 young adult novel by author Han Nolan.

== Plot summary ==
Born Blue is about the life story of Janie, also known as Leshaya. The book starts with Janie recalling as a toddler, almost drowning due to her heroin addicted mother's neglect. She is subsequently placed in strict foster care, living for about four years with foster brother Harmon who introduces her to jazz and blues. Janie is especially affected by female jazz singers and hopes to emulate them by becoming a famous singer.

Harmon is adopted by Mr. and Mrs. James of Tuscaloosa leaving Janie alone. She is then kidnapped by her mother, who then trades Janie for heroin to Mitch, a dealer. Janie lives with her new parents for a time before a chance meeting with Harmon leads her to moving in with Mr. and Mrs. James after Mitch and his partner Shelly are arrested for drug possession.

Janie finds living in this family difficult and starts hanging around a local jazz band. She falls for the band's 18-year-old songwriter, Jaz, but then, under the influence of beer and cocaine, loses her virginity to an unknown man at a band party and becomes pregnant. While carrying the child she lives with a woman called Joy Victoria and on giving birth names her daughter Etta James after one of the jazz singers that she listened to as a small child.

She then goes to see Harmon with Etta and alleges that he is the father who in turn accepts Etta so she can be raised a normal child, even though he cannot possibly be the father.

Meanwhile, Janie moves in with a musician called Paul but is thrown out after her then partner Jed is found dead of a drug overdose in Paul's bed. She finds herself at her mother's house, who is dying of AIDS and stays with her until Linda dies. Janie ponders her life and comes to peace with her past. The book concludes with Janie returning to Tuscaloosa to be with Etta but upon seeing her child living so happily, leaves her there and sets out to meet her own future.

== Characters ==
Janie (Leshaya): The protagonist who aspires to be a famous singer from listening to Jazz singers as a child. She is the daughter of Linda, a heroin addict, and becomes pregnant while using drugs. She names her daughter Etta James, after a famous jazz singer.

Harmon James: An African American boy is Janie's foster brother who is adopted out and moves to Tuscaloosa. Before leaving, he introduces Janie to jazz and blues. Janie sneaks into his bed and later claims that he is the father of her daughter Etta.

Mama Linda: Janie's mother, who is a heroin addict, trades Janie for drugs and eventually succumbs to AIDS.

Mama Shelly: Janie's foster mother, who becomes close to Janie.

Daddy Mitch: A drug dealer, foster father of Janie, and husband of Mama Shelly. He takes in Janie in a trade for heroin to Linda.

Jaz: Janie's love interest who almost gets arrested due to Janie being underage.

Paul: A guitar player who briefly gives Janie shelter, food, and lessons in music theory, before expelling her for violating his "no-drug" rule.

== Reception ==
Kirkus Reviews found Born Blue "Absolutely riveting and incredibly painful" and "Unforgettable." while Publishers Weekly stated that "... young adults mature enough to bear the story's intensity will also likely recognize the characteristics of this deeply troubled girl from their own communities."
