= Based on Happy Times =

Studio album by Tommy Keene
- Released: 1989
- Genre: Rock
- Label: Geffen
- Producer: Joe Hardy, John Hampton, Tommy Keene

Tommy Keene chronology
Songs from the Film (1986)	Based on Happy Times (1989)	Ten Years After (1996)

Based on Happy Times is an album by the American musician Tommy Keene, released in 1989.

== Critical reception ==
Professional ratings
Review scores
Source	Rating
AllMusic	4.5/5 stars
Rolling Stone	3/5 stars

The Washington Post called the album "a pleasant, tuneful collection of songs in Keene's familiar wistful mode." The Gazette wrote that "it's a simple story Keene tells over the course of 12 tough rock songs: a broken heart, a summer night, limitless possibility thwarted by equally limitless romantic angst, all of it transformed into keening, melodic guitars, poignant hooks and evocative lyrics."

== Track listing ==
All songs written by Tommy Keene, except where noted

1. "Nothing Can Change You" – 3:19
2. "Light of Love" – 3:00
3. "This Could Be Fiction" – 3:24
4. "Based on Happy Times" – 3:47
5. "When Our Vows Break" – 3:20 (Keene, Jules Shear)
6. "The Biggest Conflict" – 3:42
7. "Highwire Days" – 3:37
8. "Our Car Club" – 3:22 (Brian Wilson, Mike Love)
  - Cover of the original recording by the Beach Boys, 1963
9. "If We Run Away" – 4:06 (Keene, Shear)
10. "Hanging on to Yesterday" – 3:53
11. "Where Have All Your Friends Gone" – 2:25
12. "Pictures" – 3:34
13. "A Way Out" – 4:09

== Personnel ==
The band

- Tommy Keene — Vocals; lead, rhythm, and slide guitar; strings; keyboards
- Joe Hardy — Bass guitar, organ ("Nothing Can Change You"), strings ("Based on Happy Times"), Scale Police ("The Biggest Conflict")
- John Hampton — Drums, percussion

Additional musicians

- Jules Shear — Harmony vocals ("Nothing Can Change You", "When Our Vows Break")
- Jack Holder — Guitar ("When Our Vows Break", "The Biggest Conflict", "Highwire Days", "If We Run Away"), guitar fills ("Light of Love")
- Peter Buck — Guitar ("Our Car Club"), mandolin ("A Way Out")
- Greg "Fingers" Taylor — Harmonica ("Our Car Club")
- Jeff Jurciukonis — Cello ("A Way Out")

Production

- Joe Hardy — Producer, engineer
- John Hampton — Producer, engineer
- Tommy Keene — Producer
- George Marino — Mastering
- Barry Diament — CD mastering

Additional credits

- Digitally recorded and mixed at Ardent Studios, Memphis, Tennessee
- Mastered at Sterling Sound, New York City
- CD mastering at Barry Diament Audio, New York City
- Rocky Schenck — Photography
- Ph.D — Art direction and design
