= Robynn Ragland =

American singer-songwriter

Robynn Ragland is a singer and songwriter, based primarily in the American Midwest. Her work has appeared on soundtracks for television shows such as Dawson's Creek, MTV's The Real World, Wonderfalls, Wolf Lake, and many others.

== Career ==
Robynn was born in Joliet, Illinois.

She attended college at California Polytechnic State University in San Luis Obispo, California. While there she was the lead singer for the band Rhythm Akimbo and recorded the album Temple Beth Skyturn in 1991.

She is best known for her single "People You Know", a song which received heavy airplay on St. Louis and Midwestern radio stations. Robynn was voted "Best Pop Artist in St. Louis" in the "Slammy Awards", a local awards program, while self-released and self-promoted album "Modern American Female Gut" became the #1 Best Selling Album in Missouri & St. Louis on Amazon.com for a time, and the #5 top selling album of the year at prominent independent St. Louis record store, Vintage Vinyl.

Robynn also spent time in Los Angeles, where she was named "Songwriter of the Year 2004" by the 2004 DIY Music Convention.

Across the U.S., either solo or with her band, Robynn has opened for artists such as Boston, Tom Petty, Oasis, the Black Crowes, Fleetwood Mac, Aerosmith, and James Taylor. Robynn herself has performed with artists such as The Jayhawks, Pat Benatar, Dido, Sixpence None the Richer, Juliana Hatfield, and Barenaked Ladies.

Robynn's songs were also heard in the feature films Wish You Were Dead and the Disney Channel movie Tru Confessions.

She has a law degree from Washington University in St. Louis and is currently practicing as an attorney at a small St Louis law firm. She occasionally performs in the St Louis area.

== Trivia ==
- Robynn was voted "Best Pop Artist in St. Louis" in the 2001 "Slammies"
- Robynn was voted "2004 DIY Songwriter of the Year"

In 2003 Robynn performed alongside Boston's "Corporate America" Tour. In 2004 Robynn performed alongside Fleetwood Mac's "Say You Will" Tour.

== Discography ==
=== Official Albums ===
- Modern American Female Gut (2003)
- Paragraph Thirteen (2000)
- 105.7 The Point Platinum - Version 1.0 (2xCD, Comp) (Elizabeth Einstein 1998)
- Five of These (Five of These 1995)
- Temple Beth Skyturn (Rhythm Akimbo 1991)
- Juvenilia(Rhythm Akimbo 1990)
