= Tommy Keene =

American musician (1958–2017)

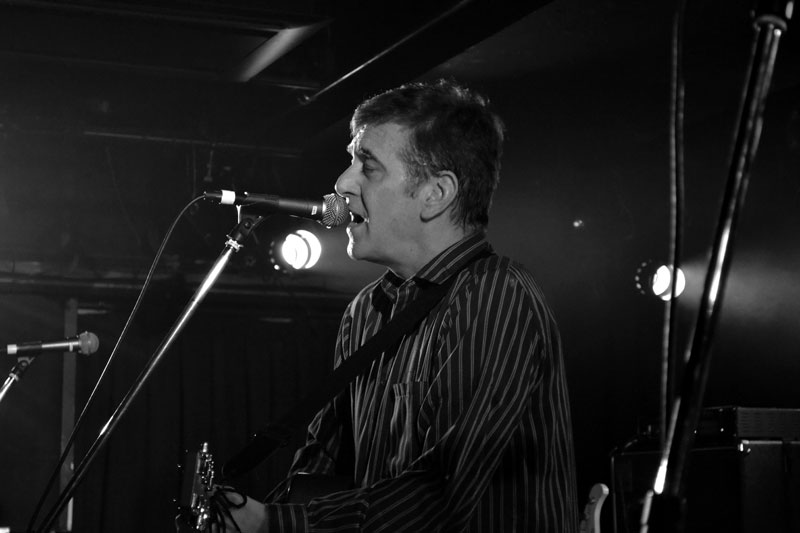
- Keene in 2015

Background information
- Born: Thomas Clay Keene; June 30, 1958; Evanston, Illinois, United States
- Origin: Bethesda, Maryland, United States
- Died: November 22, 2017 (aged 59)
- Genres: Power pop; jangle pop; rock and roll; pop rock; indie rock; alternative rock
- Occupation: Singer-songwriter
- Instruments: Guitar, vocals
- Years active: 1979–2017
- Labels: Avenue; Dolphin; Geffen; Matador; Alias; Parasol; spinART; Not Lame; Eleven Thirty; Second Motion
- Formerly of: Robert Pollard, Paul Westerberg, Goo Goo Dolls, Velvet Crush, the Razz, Richard X. Heyman
- Website: tommykeene.com

Tommy Keene (born Thomas Clay Keene; June 30, 1958 – November 22, 2017) was an American singer-songwriter, best known for releasing acclaimed songs in the 1980s. He has a longtime cult following among fans of power pop.

== Education ==
Evanston, Illinois-born Keene was raised in Bethesda, Maryland. He graduated in 1976 from Walter Johnson High School in Bethesda, which was also the alma mater of fellow musician Nils Lofgren, who went on to play and record with Neil Young and Bruce Springsteen. Keene played drums in one version of Lofgren's early bands. Keene then attended the University of Maryland, College Park.

== Musical career ==
Keene first received critical acclaim with the pioneering Washington, D.C. rock band the Razz, who released several local independent singles. His 1984 EP Places That Are Gone became one of the year's top selling independent releases. That same year, Washington City Paper dubbed Keene "one of the best pop songwriters anywhere." Places That Are Gone garnered a four-star review in Rolling Stone, and was voted the No. 1 EP in the following year's Village Voice Pazz & Jop Poll. Keene recorded and released numerous albums on such labels as Dolphin, Geffen and Matador Records. He worked with producers T-Bone Burnett, Don Dixon, and R. Walt Vincent. He continued to record and tour and released an album with Robert Pollard, of Guided by Voices, as 'The Keene Brothers.' He was also a member of Pollard's live backing band the Ascended Masters, also featuring Jon Wurster, Jason Narducy, and Dave Phillips. As well, he toured as an additional guitar player in Pollard's Boston Spaceships. Keene also played guitar on the Goo Goo Dolls' hit song, "Broadway", on their 1998 album, Dizzy Up The Girl.

In 2011, Keene released his ninth original studio album, Behind the Parade on Second Motion Records. This was the fourth release working with Second Motion's founder Stephen Judge. Judge had released Keene's 2010 two-disc retrospective Tommy Keene: You Hear Me and his previous release, Crashing The Ether. Keene's 2006 release Eleven Thirty Records was released while Judge was A&R Director and general manager at Redeye Distribution.

== Death ==
Keene died in his sleep on November 22, 2017, at the age of 59 from cardiac arrest.

== Discography ==
=== Albums ===
- Strange Alliance (1982, Avenue)
- back again (try...)(1984, Dolphin)
- Songs from the Film (1986, Geffen) U.S. No. 148
- Based on Happy Times (1989, Geffen)
- Ten Years After (1996, Matador)
- Isolation Party (1998, Matador)
- The Merry-Go-Round Broke Down (2002, spinART)
- Crashing the Ether (2006, Eleven Thirty)
- In the Late Bright (2009, Second Motion Records)
- Behind the Parade (2011, Second Motion Records)
- Excitement at Your Feet (2013, Second Motion Records)
- Laugh in the Dark (2015, Second Motion Records)

=== Compilation albums ===
- The Real Underground (1993, Alias)
- Driving into the Sun (1994, Alias)
- Drowning—A Tommy Keene Miscellany (2004, Not Lame)
- Tommy Keene You Hear Me: A Retrospective - 1983-2009 (2010, Second Motion Records)

=== Live albums ===
- Showtunes (2001, Parasol Records)
- Showtunes II (2016, Self Released)
- Rockin' The Iota (2024, TKG Estate Release)

=== EPs ===
- Places That Are Gone (1984, Dolphin)
- Back Again (Try...) (1984, Dolphin)
- Run Now (1986, Geffen)
- Sleeping on a Roller Coaster (1992, Matador)
