= John Richardson (drummer) =

American drummer (born 1964)

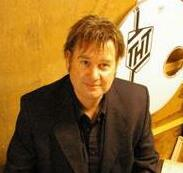
- Richardson in 2010

Background information
- Born: John Louis Richardson; May 13, 1964 (age 62); Champaign, Illinois, U.S.
- Genres: Rock, power pop, country
- Occupation: Drummer
- Years active: 1980–present

John Louis Richardson (born May 13, 1964) is an American drummer who has worked in rock and alt-country with such artists as Gin Blossoms, Badfinger, Wilco guitarist Jay Bennett, and 2012 CMA Song of the Year nominee Will Hoge. He is also owner of Drum Farm Studio in Menomonie, Wisconsin.

== Career ==
=== Early career ===
Born in Champaign, Illinois, John Louis Richardson started his professional career in 1980 with seminal Champaign-Urbana band The Martyrs. John was a founding member, along with fellow high school friends Kent Whitesell, Chris Bowe and Charles Andrews. The Martyrs reunited in 2010 for the re-release of their eponymous first album (originally released in 1983) and two live shows at the High Dive in Champaign, Illinois, on January 21 and 22, 2011. He also played in Champaign-Urbana bands Nix86 and The Vertebrats.

=== Tommy Keene ===
On the release of Tommy Keene's Based on Happy Times in 1989, Richardson was recruited to play drums for the subsequent tour (along with Brad Quinn on bass) opening for The Replacements. He played on all Tommy Keene's following albums and tours from 1992 to 2009.

=== Joey Molland of Badfinger ===
Richardson was tagged to play drums for Joey Molland (Badfinger) in 1990. He has toured the US, Canada and Europe with Molland/Badfinger and played drums on Molland's solo album, The Pilgrim, released in 1992.

=== Gin Blossoms ===
From 2008 to 2012, Richardson played drums for the Gin Blossoms, touring all over the world and recording on their 2010 album, No Chocolate Cake. The band announced on its website on March 4, 2012, that Richardson had left the band to pursue other recording and performing projects. The band stated in its news release, "John is a great drummer and all of us support his passion for recording. We all wish him the very best and thank him for all his hard work and dedication."

=== Will Hoge ===
Richardson played with Will Hoge in 2012, touring across the US and playing the venerable Ryman Auditorium for the Grand Ole Opry.

== Associations ==
=== Touring ===
Richardson has toured with many artists, including Will Hoge, Gin Blossoms, Badfinger, Tommy Keene, Shoes, Catchpenny, Adam Schmitt, Garrison Starr, Tim Easton, The Bad Examples, Ralph's World, Three Hour Tour, Weird Summer and the Bay City Rollers. He has toured throughout the United States and in Canada, Japan, England, France, Spain, Holland, Belgium, The Philippines, Brazil, Kuwait, Iraq, El Salvador and Honduras.

=== Recording ===
In the studio, he has played drums for Gin Blossoms, Joey Molland (Badfinger), Paul Chastain (Velvet Crush, Matthew Sweet), Tommy Keene, Shoes, Adam Schmitt, Keene Brothers (Robert Pollard and Tommy Keene), Garrison Starr, Robynn Ragland, The Bad Examples, Three Hour Tour, Weird Summer, Jay Bennett (Wilco), Billy Davis (Foghat), Randy Forte & the Reconstruction, Raymond Maclean, and The Dygmies.

He has worked with producers Jonathan Pines, Adam Schmitt and Mark Rubel (Champaign); Ken Coomer formerly of Wilco and Uncle Tupelo, Tom Bukovac and Joe Baldridge (Nashville); R Walt Vincent and Danny Wilde of The Rembrandts (Los Angeles); Otto D'Agnolo (Phoenix); Willie Wells (Woodstock, New York); and Jeff Murphy of Shoes (Chicago).

=== Fellow musicians ===
Richardson has performed and/or recorded with musicians including Tom Bukovac, Audley Freed (Black Crowes), John Lancaster (Gary Allan), David LaBruyere (John Mayer), Brad Rice (Keith Urban), Brad Jones (Matthew Sweet, Tommy Keene), Ethan Pilzer (Billy Joe Shaver, Jewel, Big & Rich, Jay Bennett (Wilco) and Paul Chastain (Velvet Crush, Matthew Sweet).

== Media ==
=== Television appearances ===
Richardson has performed on Fox News All-American New Year's Eve and Twelve News Phoenix – Downtown Goes Live (with Gin Blossoms), Late Night with Conan O'Brien (with Tommy Keene), WGN News (with Shoes and WGN Morning News) and with Ralph's World).

== Equipment ==
Richardson is currently sponsored by Maple Works Drums, Evans Drumheads, Paiste Cymbals, Vic Firth, Groove Juice, Slug Percussion, Heritage Cajon and Alclair In-Ear Monitors.

== Discography ==
=== Albums and EPs ===
- 2018: Dichotomous Thinking, Elysium
- 2018: Randy Forte is Chas Randall, Randy Forte
- 2017: I Can Hardly Wait, Rich Kids
- 2017: Dawn Marie EP, Dawn Marie
- 2016: After All This Time/Young and Bittersweet (singles), The Surly Bells
- 2016: Disaster in Blue, Amanda Fama
- 2016: Tammy Jo, Tammy Jo
- 2016: I Am Enough, Tera Hinzman
- 2016: Fish Out of Water, Diver Ida
- 2015: High Tide Adventures, David G Moore
- 2015: Searching for the American Dream, War Poets
- 2015: The Small Square, The Small Square
- 2015: Laugh in the Dark, Tommy Keene
- 2015: Somewhere in Durand, Biesterveld
- 2015: Light Over There, Light Over There
- 2015: Action and Heroes, Three Hour Tour
- 2015: Freeway, Whale House
- 2015: American Police State, War Poets
- 2014: Paint the Fence, John Lynch
- 2014: Hot and Cold, War Poets
- 2013: This Old Town, Biesterveld
- 2013: The New Romantic, Randy Forte and the Reconstruction
- 2012: Eleven Steps from Where You Are, Randy Forte and the Reconstruction
- 2011: Ignition, Shoes
- 2011: Three, Catchpenny
- 2011: Wonder Falling Under, Randy Forte and the Reconstruction
- 2010: Tommy Keene You Hear Me: A Retrospective 1983-2009, Tommy Keene
- 2010: The Martyrs Remixed and Remastered, The Martyrs
- 2010: No Chocolate Cake, Gin Blossoms
- 2010: Never The First To Jump, David G. Moore
- 2010: Looking For Tomorrow, Three Hour Tour
- 2009: In The Late Bright, Tommy Keene
- 2008: I.S.O. (In Search Of), Weird Summer
- 2007: B Side Oblivion, Three Hour Tour
- 2006: Blues & Boogie Shoes, The Keene Brothers (Robert Pollard and Tommy Keene)
- 2006: Crashing the Ether, Tommy Keene
- 2004: Drowning—A Tommy Keene Miscellany, Tommy Keene
- 2003: Modern American Female Gut, Robynn Ragland
- 2002: The Merry-Go-Round Broke Down, Tommy Keene
- 2002: Chemistry, The Dygmies
- 2001: Showtunes, Tommy Keene
- 2001: The Palace at 4am, Part I, Jay Bennett & Edward Burch
- 2001: Demolition, Adam Schmitt
- 2000: Modern American Female Gut, Robynn Ragland
- 2000: Paragraph Thirteen, Robynn Ragland
- 1999: Incarnata Mysterica, Weird Summer
- 1998: Isolation Party, Tommy Keene
- 1997: Race to Mars, The Dygmies
- 1997: The Nerk Twins, (Jeff Murphy)
- 1996: Their Titanic Majesty's Request, Titanic Love Affair (Jay Bennett)
- 1996: Better Off At Home, Bludgers
- 1996: Ten Years After, Tommy Keene
- 1996: 1969, Three Hour Tour
- 1996: Day One, Figurehead
- 1995: Tore a Hole, Shoes
- 1995: Fret Buzz, Shoes
- 1994: Driving Into The Sun, Tommy Keene
- 1993: The Real Underground, Tommy Keene
- 1993: Illiterature, Adam Schmitt
- 1993: Yellow Pills: Best of American Pop 1, Tommy Keene and Adam Schmitt
- 1992: Sleeping on a Roller Coaster, Tommy Keene
- 1992: The Pilgrim, Joey Molland (Badfinger)
- 1991: World So Bright, Adam Schmitt
- 1983: The Martyrs, The Martyrs
