= That's the Way It Is (Mel and Kim song) =

1988 single by Mel and Kim

Single by Mel and Kim

from the album Coming to America: Original Motion Picture Soundtrack
- B-side: "You Changed My Life"
- Released: 15 February 1988
- Recorded: October 1987 – January 1988
- Genre: Dance-pop
- Length: 3:25
- Label: Supreme; PolyGram
- Songwriter: Stock Aitken Waterman
- Producer: Stock Aitken Waterman

Mel and Kim singles chronology
"I'm the One Who Really Loves You" (1987)	"That's the Way It Is" (1988)	"More Than Words Can Say" (1989)

Music video
- "That's the Way It Is" on YouTube

"That's the Way It Is" is a song by British pop duo Mel and Kim that was featured on the soundtrack album of Coming to America, starring Eddie Murphy. The song was written and produced by Stock Aitken Waterman (SAW). The single, released by Supreme Records and PolyGram peaked at number ten in the United Kingdom, becoming their fourth consecutive top ten hit.

== Background and release ==
By the time of the single's release, Melanie Appleby had been diagnosed with cancer and had withdrawn from the public eye in mid-1987. She discharged herself from hospital to record the vocals for the track, with the singer keen for a return to normality and the distraction of a creative outlet after months of rigorous treatment.

The sisters made Mel's illness public at the time of the release of this single, and both appeared on the Wogan show in April 1988 while Mel was still undergoing treatment, as part of European Cancer Week.

The B-side of the single was a new song, "You Changed My Life", which was the first song on which the sisters had a co-writer credit. Written by the siblings during Mel's treatment, the pair submitted it to SAW as a potential single.

"That's the Way It Is" was not included on the group's debut album, F.L.M.. It has been included on later compilation albums of the duo, along with "You Changed My Life", with both tracks appearing on the 2010 deluxe edition re-issue of F.L.M.

Due to Mel's illness, the sisters did not appear in the promotional videoclip for the song. Instead, it featured a team of dancers in a studio, much like the video clip of their previous single. A second music video for the song was also released. combining footage of the dancers from the first video for the song with footage from the sisters' earlier music videos and a live performance of "F.L.M.".

It would be the last release by the duo, as they disappeared from the public eye again while Mel Appleby continued her cancer treatment. She succumbed to pneumonia in January 1990, her immune system weakened by chemotherapy. Some of the songs she co-wrote with Kim Appleby during the last two years of her life were later released on Kim's debut solo album, released in late 1990.

== Critical reception ==
David Stubbs from Melody Maker wrote, "Positively the only new pop I've any affection for. Funny how Stock, Aitken and Waterman seem to reserve their best exertions for these two. Perhaps it's their voices, dry and sparkling as opposed to the offhandedly damp Bananarama. Whatever, obnoxious as the lyric is, this tick, slap and kiss is the way it is." Jerry Smith of Music Week considered "That's the Way It Is" as continuing the SAW "successful formula" and predicted a "big hit with this slick, insistent dance track". Michele Kirsch from NME commented, "Their style true to substance, the gorgeous girlies sing in matter-of-ugly-fact tones, with no pretense at heartbroken sentiment. And that's the way, oh huh, uh, huh, i like it." Johnny Dee from Record Mirror said, "Innocuous rubbish from the conveyor belt studio. When this pair first appeared and went all bendy in their videos they did something to me I just can't explain in words of more than one syllable. But now the SAW formula has been worked until it's blue in the face and this song sounds all too familiar. Sure, its going to be a top five hit, but it will turn teenage brains into shaving foam." The magazine's James Hamilton wrote in his dance column, "Brightly thrashing enthusiastic 117 3/4bpm flier, more beefily pounding than usual but you can still sing "FLM" in place of the new staccato title line". In a review published in Smash Hits, Boy George considered the song "incidentally sounds a lot like another record by [SAW]".

Retrospectively, in 2017, Christian Guiltenane of British magazine Attitude stated that the song was "blueprint SAW: catchy chorus, energetic production but Mel and Kim’s sassy vocals gave the sugary melody some much needed bite". In 2021, British magazine Classic Pop ranked the song number 30 in their list of "Top 40 Stock Aitken Waterman songs", deemed it a "gem".

== Chart performance ==
"That's the Way It Is" was the duo's final top ten hit in the UK. It entered the OCC chart at number 24 on 27 February 1988, reached number ten two weeks later, and charted for a total seven weeks. The single attained its best chart position in both the Flanders region of Belgium and Finland, where it peaked at number four, and achieved success in several other European countries, also peaking within the top ten in the Netherlands and Switzerland, where it culminated at number five and nine. It missed the top ten by one place in Ireland and reached number 18 in Germany, where it charted for four and 13 weeks, respectively. By contrast, it was a minor hit in France, stalling at number 36. On the Pan-Eurochart Hot 100 singles chart established by the Music & Media magazine, "That's the Way It Is" debuted at number 83 on 5 March 1988, culminated at number 22 in its third week, and fell off the chart after 15 weeks of presence. It also spent eight weeks on the European Airplay Top 50, with a peak at number ten. Regarding the Oceanian markets, the single reached number ten in New Zealand, becoming Mel & Kim's fourth top ten hit, while it peaked at number 28 in Australia, thus being the duo's less successful single in the country.

== Track listings ==
- 7″ (SUPE 117)
1. "That's the Way It Is" – 3:25
2. "You Changed My Life" – 3:21
- 12″ (SUPE T 117 / RCA PT 41832)
1. "That's the Way It Is" (12″/club mix) – 6:47
2. "I'm the One Who Really Loves You" (US remix) – 5:57
3. "You Changed My Life" – 3:21
- 12″ picture disc (SUPE TP 117)
1. "That's the Way It Is" (12″/club mix) – 6:47
2. "I'm the One Who Really Loves You" (US remix) – 5:57
3. "You Changed My Life" – 3:21
- 12″ remix (SUPE TX 117)
1. "That's the Way It Is" (house remix/special mix) – 6:42
2. "I'm the One Who Really Loves You" (US remix) – 5:57
3. "You Changed My Life" – 3:21
- 12″ remix (SUPE TZ 117)
1. "That's the Way It Is" (Acid house mix) – 7:38
2. "That's the Way It Is" (Acid dub)
3. "You Changed My Life" – 3:21
- CD single (SUPCD 117)
1. "That's the Way It Is" (12″/club mix) – 6:47
2. "I'm the One Who Really Loves You" (US mix) – 5:57
3. "You Changed My Life" – 3:21

== Charts ==
=== Weekly charts ===
1988 weekly chart performance for "That's the Way It Is"
Chart (1988)	Peak position
Australia (Australian Music Report)	28
Belgium (Ultratop 50 Flanders)	4
Denmark (IFPI)	11
Europe (European Hot 100)	22
Europe (European Airplay Top 50)	10
Finland (Suomen virallinen lista)	4
France (SNEP)	36
Germany (GfK)	18
Ireland (IRMA)	11
Luxembourg (Radio Luxembourg)	5
Netherlands (Dutch Top 40)	8
Netherlands (Single Top 100)	5
New Zealand (Recorded Music NZ)	10
Switzerland (Schweizer Hitparade)	9
UK Singles (Official Charts)	10
UK Dance (Music Week)	9

=== Year-end charts ===
1988 year-end chart performance for "That's the Way It Is"
Chart (1988)	Position
Belgium (Ultratop Flanders)	68
Netherlands (Dutch Top 40)	85
Netherlands (Single Top 100)	71
