= FLM =

FLM may refer to:

== Arts, entertainment and media ==
- F.L.M. (album), 1987 album by Mel and Kim
  - "F.L.M." (song), the album's title track
- Family Life Ministries, an American Christian organization, operator of Family Life Network radio stations
- First Look Media, an American news organization
- Fun Little Movies, an American film production company

== Transportation ==
- FLM Aviation, a defunct German airline
- Filadelfia Airport, in Paraguay, IATA airport code FLM
- Flimby railway station, in England, station code FLM

== Other uses ==
- FLM Panelcraft, a British coachbuilder
- Feline leukomyelopathy, a disorder in non-domestic cats
- Focal length multiplier, or crop factor, in digital photography
- Formula Le Mans, now Le Mans Prototype Challenge, a motor race
- Macina Liberation Front (French: Force de libération du Macina), or Katiba Macina, a militant Islamist group in Mali
- Malagasy Lutheran Church (Fiangonana Loterana Malagasy), a Christian church in Madagascar
- Ceramica Flaminia, UCI team code FLM, a defunct cycling team
