= G.L.A.D =

1991 single by Kim Appleby

Single by Kim Appleby

from the album Kim Appleby
- B-side: "G.L.A.D" (instrumental)
- Released: 28 January 1991
- Genre: House; pop
- Length: 3:03
- Label: Parlophone
- Songwriters: Kim Appleby; Melanie Appleby; Craig Logan
- Producers: George DeAngelis; Pete Schwier

Kim Appleby singles chronology
"Don't Worry" (1990)	"G.L.A.D" (1991)	"Mama" (1991)

Music video
- "G.L.A.D" on YouTube

"G.L.A.D" is a song by English singer-songwriter and actress Kim Appleby, released in January 1991 by Parlophone Records as the second single from her debut solo album, Kim Appleby (1990). It stands for "Good Lovin And Devotion" and was co-written by her with her sister, Melanie Appleby and Craig Logan. The remix, which was also used in the accompanying music video, features a rap from Aswad vocalist Brinsley Forde. It peaked at number ten on the UK Singles Chart for two weeks in February 1991. "G.L.A.D" also peaked at number five in Luxembourg, number six in Belgium, and number seven in Ireland.

== Critical reception ==
A reviewer from Liverpool Echo complimented the song as "cheerful and catchy." Andrew Mueller from Melody Maker wrote, "Not bad. Not bad at all." He added, "Not a million miles from the old Mel & Kim monster with the initials in it and, for not many different reasons, not a less than quite good thing to bounce up and down to for a few minutes." Pan-European magazine Music & Media commented, "The well-known PWL-vibe, sometimes known as 'the sound of a bright young Britain' strikes back. [...] It's solid but not exactly profound." Terry Staunton from NME said, "Kim follows her initial solo success with a nice enough song, but not as special as 'Don't Worry'. She's got a thing about initials by the sound of things, as those of you who bought Mel & Kim's 'F.L.M.' will recall." Newcastle Evening Chronicle described it as "bouncy bubbly pop", noting that Appleby co-wrote it with late sister Mel and ex Bros Craig Logan.

== Music video ==
The music video for "G.L.A.D" was directed by British director, producer and writer of films and television series Nick Willing. It features Aswad vocalist Brinsley Forde.

== Track listings ==
- 7-inch single
1. "G.L.A.D" (7-inch remix) – 3:03
2. "G.L.A.D" (instrumental) – 3:04
- 12-inch single
1. "G.L.A.D" (Harding/Curnow remix) – 6:50
2. "G.L.A.D" (Pete Schwier remix) – 6:15
3. "G.L.A.D" (7-inch remix) – 3:03
- CD single
1. "G.L.A.D" (7-inch remix) – 3:03
2. "G.L.A.D" (Harding/Curnow remix) – 6:50
3. "G.L.A.D" (Pete Schwier remix) – 6:15

== Charts ==
=== Weekly charts ===
Chart (1991)	Peak position
Australia (ARIA)	158
Austria (Ö3 Austria Top 40)	22
Belgium (Ultratop 50 Flanders)	6
Europe (Eurochart Hot 100)	18
Europe (European Hit Radio)	7
Finland (Suomen virallinen lista)	17
Germany (GfK)	19
Ireland (IRMA)	7
Israel (Israeli Singles Chart)	8
Luxembourg (Radio Luxembourg)	5
Netherlands (Dutch Top 40)	13
Netherlands (Single Top 100)	16
Switzerland (Schweizer Hitparade)	14
UK Singles (OCC)	10
UK Airplay (Music Week)	2
UK Dance (Music Week)	40

=== Year-end charts ===
Chart (1991)	Position
Belgium (Ultratop)	91
Europe (European Hit Radio)	61
Germany (Media Control)	94

== Release history ==
Region	Date	Format(s)	Label(s)	Ref.
United Kingdom	28 January 1991	7-inch vinyl; 12-inch vinyl; CD; cassette	Parlophone	
Australia	15 April 1991	7-inch vinyl; cassette	Parlophone	
