= Rita Simons =

English actress and singer (born 1977)

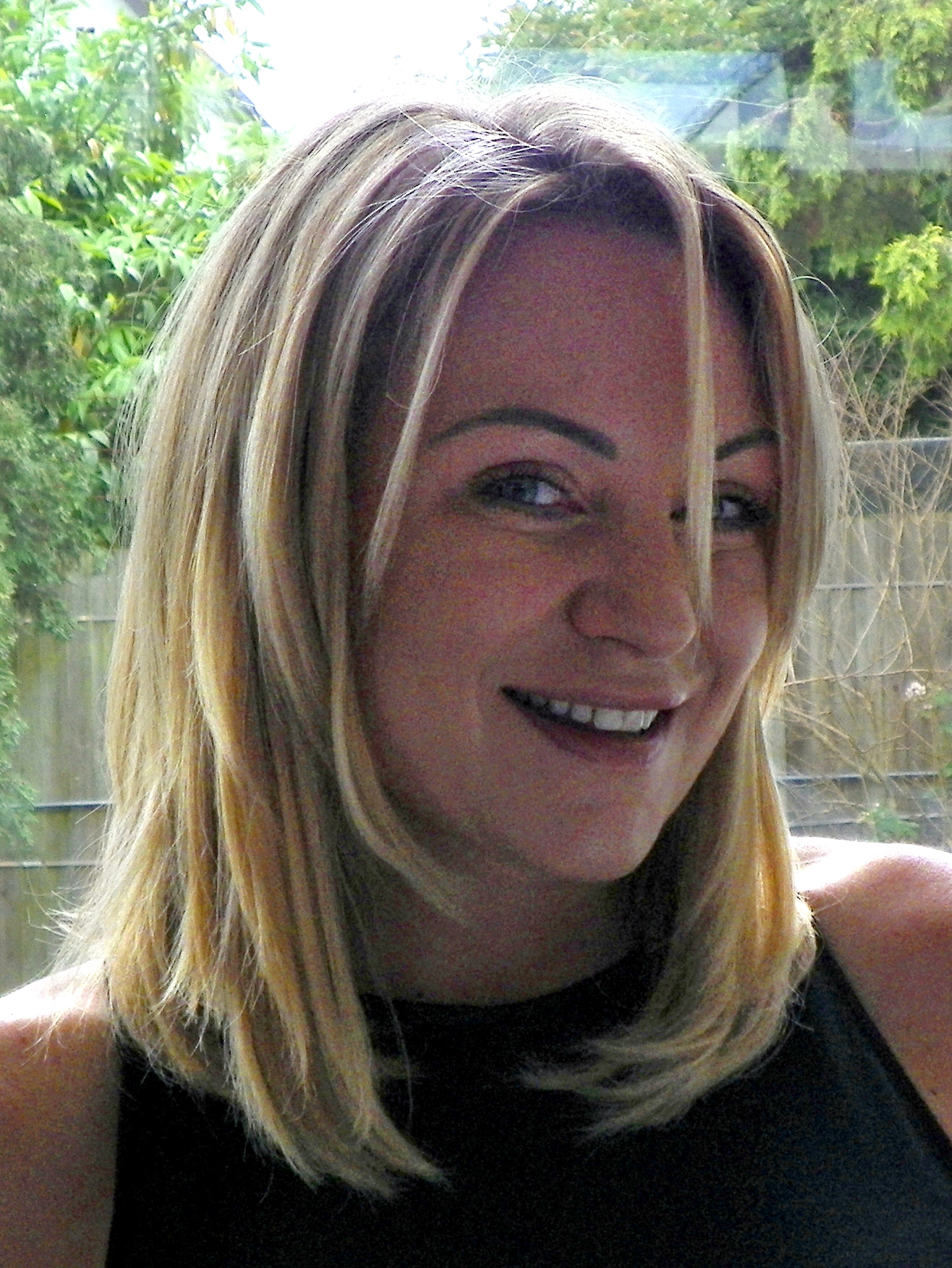
- Simons in 2016
- Born: Rita Joanne Simons; 10 March 1977 (age 49); Whipps Cross, London, England
- Other name: Rita Silveston
- Occupations: Actress; singer
- Years active: 2000–present
- Known for: Role of Roxy Mitchell in EastEnders
- Television: Mile High; Dream Team; London's Burning; EastEnders; I'm a Celebrity...Get Me Out of Here! Hollyoaks
- Spouse(s): Theo Silveston (m. 2004; div. 2018) Ben Harlow (m. 2025)
- Children: 2
- Relatives: Alan Sugar (uncle)

Rita Joanne Simons (born 10 March 1977) is an English actress and singer. After beginning her career as a member of the short-lived girl group Girls@Play, she became best known for playing Roxy Mitchell in the BBC soap opera EastEnders from 2007 to 2017, when her character was killed off, alongside her on-screen character's sister Ronnie Mitchell (Samantha Womack). For her performance on the show Simons received many accolades, including the 2008 National Television Award for "Most Popular Newcomer".

Outside of EastEnders, Simons has appeared as contestant on the eighteenth series of I'm a Celebrity...Get Me Out of Here! and has appeared in various theatre productions. Between 2024 and 2025, she portrayed Marie Fielding in the Channel 4 soap opera Hollyoaks.

== Early life ==
Simons was born on 10 March 1977 at Whipps Cross University Hospital in Whipps Cross, Leytonstone, London to Susan (née Franks) and Mark Simons. Both of her parents are Jewish. She has an older brother, Ben. Through her paternal aunt's marriage, Simons is the niece of billionaire businessman Alan Sugar.

== Career ==
=== Music career and early acting work ===
Before her acting career, Simons was in the group Girls@Play, who had a couple of hit singles before splitting up. Their songs included "Airhead" and a cover of Mel and Kim's "Respectable". Simons then joined a different group called Charli with three other members, including Shar from the Paradiso Girls, and released a single titled "Feel Me".

Simons made appearances in the Sky One dramas Dream Team (2002) and Mile High (2003; as Hannah), as well as the ITV drama London's Burning.

=== EastEnders ===
On 11 May 2007, it was announced that she would be joining the cast of EastEnders as Roxy Mitchell, alongside Samantha Womack who played Roxy's sister Ronnie Mitchell. Of her role, Simons said: "I've always watched EastEnders and it's been my dream to become part of the Mitchell family."

Simons temporarily departed from EastEnders in late 2015 (the character departed from screens from 1 January to 4 May 2016), allowing the actress to take part in a Snow White pantomime at the Marlowe Theatre in Canterbury, over the 2015–2016 Christmas and New Year period.

In August 2016, it was announced that Simons was leaving EastEnders along with Samantha Womack. Her on-screen character Roxy Mitchell drowned in a swimming pool in an episode broadcast on New Year's Day 2017, along with her sister Ronnie. Simons made a voiceover appearance in May 2019, during the return of Roxy's ex-husband Sean Slater (Robert Kazinsky), which saw him listen to a voicemail from Roxy on an old mobile phone. She made a cameo reappearance on 27 April 2023, as Roxy imagined by her daughter Amy during a family counselling session. Since Ronnie and Roxy were "killed off", EastEnders fans have continued to campaign for the characters to be resurrected, including sending potential scripts and return plots to the show's bosses.

=== Other work ===
Simons appeared as Paulette Bonafonte in the 2017–2018 UK tour of Legally Blonde: the Musical in 2017.

On 12 November 2018, Simons was confirmed to be participating as a contestant on the eighteenth series of I'm a Celebrity...Get Me Out of Here!. She was the fourth to be eliminated on 4 December 2018.

In 2019, Simons played the role of ‘Miss Hedge’ in the hit musical Everybody's Talking About Jamie at the Apollo Theatre. She was to take on the role of Velma von Tussle in the 2021 revival of Hairspray at the London Coliseum. In 2022, she joined the cast of TV show, Professor T.

She participated in Pilgrimage: The Road Through Portugal, aired in 2023, a BBC Two series dedicated to a pilgrimage to Fátima, Portugal, with six other celebrities. She was the only Jewish pilgrim and had the chance to visit a former synagogue in Tomar.

In 2023, it was announced that Simons would be joining the cast of the Channel 4 soap opera Hollyoaks. She made her debut as Marie Fielding, the mother of established character Joel Dexter (Rory Douglas-Speed), in March 2024. In July 2025 it was announced that Simons would be leaving the soap. She departed in October following the show's 30th anniversary celebrations, when her character was seen moving into Brookside Close under an alias.

== Charity work ==
In December 2009, Simons visited her old secondary school, Watford Grammar School for Girls, to open the Christmas fair.

In December 2010, Simons launched the RNID Christmas Concert where she announced that her five-year-old daughter is deaf.

In July 2011, Simons held an autograph session at the St Nicholas Primary School summer fair in Elstree.

In December 2011, Simons hosted the annual Action on Hearing Loss concert along with the Mayor of Camden, Councillor Abdul Quadir.

Simons appeared on an episode of Big Star's Little Star, broadcast on 1 April 2015, and won £13,000 for charity.

== Personal life ==
Simons is divorced from her first husband and father of their two daughters, Theo Silveston. She married her second husband Ben Harlow on 16 September 2025, at Hidden River Barn, Longtown, Cumbria, she was given away by her close friend, Duncan James with Simons' twin teenage daughters Maiya and Jaimee, acting as her bridesmaids.

Simons is best friends with Eastenders, co-star Samantha Womack, who played her on-screen sister Ronnie Mitchell in the soap series.

Simons has been diagnosed with scoliosis.

In July 2018, Simons revealed that she has been diagnosed with ADHD, OCD, anxiety and insomnia.

== Filmography ==
=== Television ===
Year	Show	Role	Notes
2002	Dream Team	Prostitute	Episode: "Danny and Peggsy Go Large"
2003	Mile High	Hannah	1 episode #1.4
2007–2017, 2019, 2023	EastEnders	Roxy Mitchell	970 episodes
2007–2013	BBC Children in Need	Roxy Mitchell / Herself	
2009	All Star Mr & Mrs		
2009, 2022	The Weakest Link	Herself	Contestant
2009–2011	EastEnders Revealed	Herself	Including clips of Simons' portrayal as Roxy
2011	All Star Family Fortunes	Herself	
2011	Epic Win!	Herself	
2012–2013	Celebrity Juice	Herself	
2012	My Daughter, Deafness and Me	Herself	
2012, 2019	Celebrity Chase	Herself	
2013	I Love My Country	Herself	Panelist
2013	Pointless Celebrities	Herself	Contestant
2015	EastEnders: Back to Ours	Herself	Including clips of Simons' portrayal as Roxy
2015	Big Star's Little Star	Herself	Contestant
2016	The One Show	Herself / Roxy Mitchell	Peggy Mitchell's final episode
2017	Tipping Point: Lucky Stars	Herself	Contestant
2018	I'm a Celebrity...Get Me Out of Here!	Herself	Contestant; eliminated fourth
2018–2021	Lorraine	Herself	3 episodes
2019	The Stages of My Life	Herself	
2019	Piers Morgan's Life Stories	Herself	Guest; Alan Sugar's niece
2019	Loose Women	Herself	Guest
2020	Richard Osman's House of Games	Herself	Contestant
2020	Harry Redknapp's Sandbanks Summer	Herself	
2020	Hey Tracey!	Herself	Special guest
2020	Celebrity Supermarket Sweep	Herself	
2021	Britain's Brightest Celebrity Family	Herself	Contestant; semi-finalist
2021	Celebrity MasterChef	Herself	Contestant
2022	Professor T	Debbie Sanderson	Episode: "DNA of a Murderer"
2024-2025	Hollyoaks	Marie Fielding	Regular role
2024	Drama Queens	Herself	

=== Film ===
Year	Show	Role	Notes
2018	The Krays: Dead Man Walking	Lisa Prescott	

=== Theatre ===
Year	Show	Role	Notes
2015	Snow White and the Seven Dwarfs	Queen Ivannah	Marlowe Theatre
2017	Aladdin	Scheherazade	Beck Theatre
2017	Legally Blonde: The Musical	Paulette Bonafonte	Tour
2018	Sleeping Beauty	Carabosse	Pavilion Theatre, Bournemouth
2019	Sleeping Beauty	Carabosse	Alban Arena
2019	The House on Cold Hill	Caro Harcourt	Tour
2019	Everybody's Talking About Jamie	Miss Hedge	Apollo Theatre
2021	Hairspray	Velma von Tussle	London Coliseum
2021	Sleeping Beauty	Carabosse	Derby Arena
2022	Peter Pan	Captain Hook	Hawth Theatre
2023	Beauty and the Beast	Enchantress	Assembly Hall Theatre

== Accolades ==
Year	Award	Category	Result	Ref
2008	National Television Awards	Most Popular Newcomer	Won	
2008	Inside Soap Awards	Best Newcomer	Won	
2008	Digital Spy Soap Awards	Best Newcomer	Won	
2008	Digital Spy Soap Awards	Best On-Screen Partnership (with Samantha Janus)	Won	
2008	TV Now Awards	Favourite Newcomer to Irish TV (with Samantha Janus)	Won	
2008	The British Soap Awards	Best Newcomer	Nominated	
2008	The British Soap Awards	Best On-Screen Partnership (with Samantha Janus)	Nominated	
2008	The British Soap Awards	Sexiest Female	Nominated	
2008	TV Quick and TV Choice Awards	Best Newcomer	Nominated	
2009	All About Soap Bubble Awards	Fatal Attraction (with Robert Kazinsky)	Won	
2009	All About Soap Bubble Awards	Killer Secret (with Robert Kazinsky & Scott Maslen)	Nominated	
2009	TV Now Awards	Favourite Female Soap Star	Nominated	
2011	British Soap Awards	Sexiest Female	Shortlisted	
2017	Inside Soap Awards	Best Exit (with Samantha Janus)	Shortlisted	
2017	Inside Soap Awards	Show Stopper (with Samantha Janus)	Shortlisted	
2018	BRIFTLIX Indie Film Awards	Best Actress	Won	

== See also ==
- List of I'm a Celebrity...Get Me Out of Here! (British TV series) contestants
