= Mel and Kim =

1986–1990 British pop duo

- Melanie Appleby and Kim Appleby in 1987

Background information
- Origin: London, England
- Genre: Dance-pop
- Years active: 1986–1990
- Labels: Supreme (1986–1989); Parlophone (1989–1990); Dancing Nation (2018–)
- Past members: Melanie Appleby; Kim Appleby
- Website: melandkim.com

Mel and Kim (stylized as MӗL & KIM) were an English pop duo, consisting of sisters Melanie and Kim Appleby. Originally managed by Alan Whitehead, they achieved success between 1986 and 1988, before Melanie died of cancer in January 1990 at the age of 23.

The duo reached number one in the UK Singles Chart with their 1987 single "Respectable", which also topped the US dance chart. They had three other UK Top 10 hits with "Showing Out (Get Fresh at the Weekend)" (1986), "F.L.M." (1987) and "That's the Way It Is" (1988). In 1988, they were nominated for a Brit Award for Best British Breakthrough Act. After Mel's death, Kim embarked on a solo career and had two UK Top 10 hits with "Don't Worry" (1990) and "G.L.A.D." (1991).

== History ==
Mel & Kim were born to English and Jamaican parents. In 1985, Mel recorded two demos solo, under Alan Whitehead's management. Soon after, her sister Kim joined her and they performed as a duo, recording some demos. The demos got them signed with Supreme Records, and Nick East – president of Supreme – put them in touch with producers Stock Aitken Waterman. They were managed at the time by Alan Whitehead, but as soon as their first single charted he was sacked. They were styled by the late Isabella Blow.

"I remember we were shocked that these were the guys who produced the Princess track "Say I'm Your Number One" because we were expecting someone like Quincy Jones," Kim said of her first meeting with the production team. "We were convinced that they had some young groovy guy who was doing all the work, and they were just fronting it."

A sedate soul-pop track "System" was intended as their first single, but their producers were unhappy with it, and it became the "B-side" of their first release "Showing Out (Get Fresh at the Weekend)". After getting to know the girls, producer Pete Waterman became convinced the act's music should reflect their feisty and streetwise personalities, with the then-emerging Chicago House sound chosen as a perfect vehicle.

"We got a call from Nick East, saying they had decided to scrap 'System' and we were devastated," Kim said. "We thought we had done something wrong, but he explained that after hanging with us in the pub, Pete went back to the studio the next day and said, we need something completely tough; we need something with an attitude."

The reorientation worked; "Showing Out" reached number three on the British charts in 1986. It was a minor hit in America peaking at No. 78, but did peak at No. 1 on the Dance Chart there. Their next single "Respectable" reached number one in Britain, and sold in excess of 800,000 copies there. "The follow up was genius," recalled Kim "It started to go global; 'Respectable' just took it to another level." The sisters became well-known celebrities in Europe, particularly in Britain, and were known for their visual style which combined urban street wear with high fashion (prior to their music career Mel had worked as a glamour model). Their third single "F.L.M." reached number seven in the UK, while their final single "That's the Way It Is" reached number ten, giving them an unbroken run of top ten hits in the UK. In February 1988, they were nominated for Best British Breakthrough Act at the Brit Awards, losing out to Wet Wet Wet.

In 1985, prior to the duo's recording career, Mel was treated for malignant paraganglioma, a form of cancer, on her liver. By January 1987, Mel was experiencing back problems, delaying the filming of the "Respectable" music video. During a promotional visit to Japan in June 1987, Mel's back pain worsened, rendering her unable to perform, and she returned to the UK in a wheelchair. A recurrence of the cancer was detected in Mel's spine after undergoing tests at Barts. The sisters withdrew from publicity while Mel underwent treatment, while trying to keep the diagnosis secret from the public and many colleagues. Planned studio time with PWL engineer Yoyo, where the sisters intended to work on developing their own compositions, was cancelled.

Footage from their Montreux Festival performance was used to compile the "F.L.M." music video, with the sisters mainly represented by a pair of lookalike marionettes. While the media speculated that Mel was being treated for cancer, both sisters categorically denied this, stating that Mel had suffered a debilitating back injury.

Kim later confessed she was "devastated" by the widely-panned "F.L.M." video, having not been consulted on its contents, and only seeing it for the first time when it was aired on TV. The singer, who said that her sister Mel was equally dissatisfied with the clip, added that she would have preferred that no video was released at all. Nick East retrospectively described the video as a "mistake."

Mel and Kim released a new single in February 1988, "That's the Way It Is", becoming their fourth consecutive UK top 10 hit. Mel discharged herself from hospital to record the vocals for the track. The B-side, "You Changed My Life", was composed by the sisters during Mel's treatment and was submitted to the producers as a potential single. Work on a second album produced by Stock Aitken Waterman was not continued, due to Mel's illness. Both sisters appeared on the Wogan show in April 1988 while Mel was still undergoing treatment, as part of European Cancer Week. Later in late summer 1988, after Mel had finished chemotherapy, the duo appeared on Good Morning Britain to promote the need for teenage cancer wards in British hospitals.

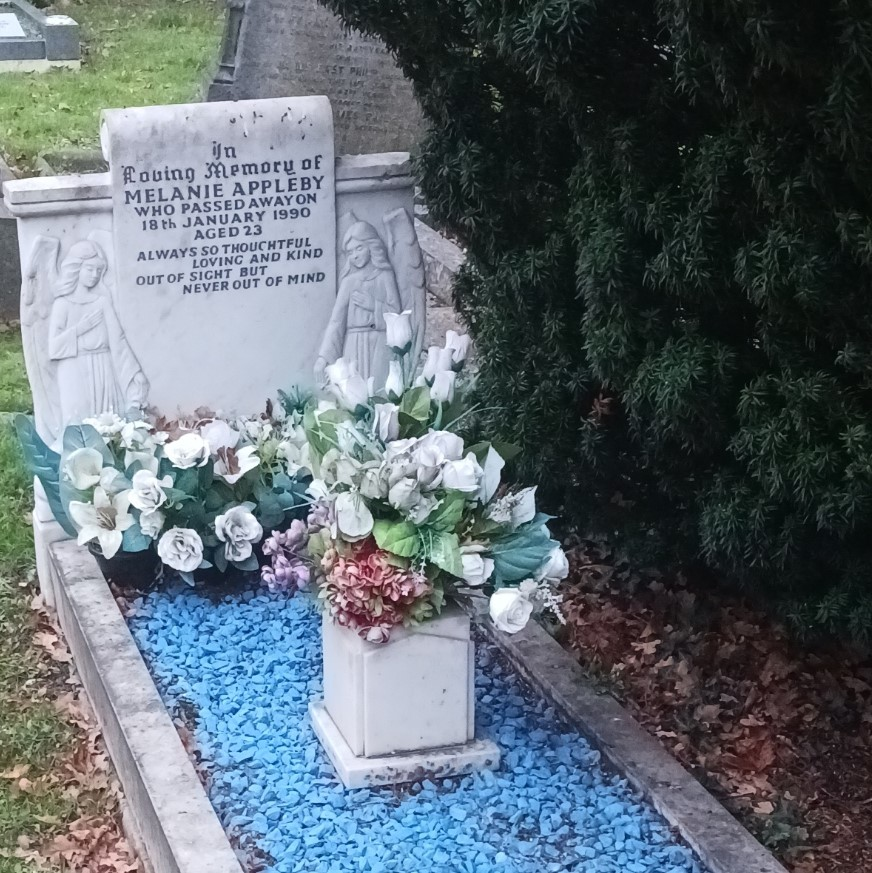
Grave of Melanie Appleby

The sisters then again withdrew from publicity while writing songs for a second album; several of these songs later appeared on Kim's debut solo album. In a TV interview with Trisha Goddard in 2005, Kim revealed that she knew Mel's illness was terminal in mid-1989. On 18 January 1990, Mel died suddenly of pneumonia after contracting a cold; her immune system weakened by chemotherapy.

In January 2018, the release of a previously unreleased unfinished demo track, "Where Is Love", was announced on the official Mel & Kim website. It was released in February 2018.

== After Mel and Kim ==
With the aid of her then-boyfriend, ex-Bros bassist Craig Logan, Kim launched a solo career with much of her debut solo album composed of songs co-written with Mel, for what had been intended to be the next "Mel and Kim" album. The album, Kim Appleby, contained her debut solo single "Don't Worry", which reached number two on the British charts in November 1990. A follow-up single "G.L.A.D" was also a UK Top 10 hit. Subsequent singles from her debut album were "Mama" [No. 19] and "If You Cared" [No. 44].

Kim's second album, Breakaway, was not a commercial success and had a limited release. She released three further singles: "Light of the World" [No. 41, 1993], "Breakaway" [No. 56, 1993], and "Free Spirit" [No. 51, 1994]. A download-only single called "High" was released in 2007.

In 2010, a deluxe double-disc edition of F.L.M. was released, which included extended bonus tracks as well as the single "That's The Way It Is" and various remixes of the original hits.

In October 2019, Cherry Red Records released a seven-disc Mel & Kim CD singles box set.

== Discography ==
=== Studio albums ===
List of albums, with selected details, chart positions, and certifications
Title	Details	Peak chart positions								Certifications
Title	Details	UK	AUS	GER	NLD	NOR	NZ	SWE	SWI	Certifications
F.L.M.	Released: 13 April 1987; Label: Supreme	3	2	16	12	7	2	20	4	BPI: Platinum

=== Compilation albums ===
- The Best of Mel & Kim (1996)
- That's the Way It Is – The Best of Mel & Kim/Kim Appleby (2001)
- F.L.M. – The Best of Mel & Kim/Kim Appleby (2002)

=== Remix albums ===
- Something Special (1989)

=== Box sets ===
- The Singles Box Set (2019)

=== Singles ===
List of singles, with selected chart positions and certifications, showing year released and album name
Title	Year	Peak chart positions											Certifications	Album
Title	Year	UK	AUS	BEL (FLA)	FRA	GER	IRE	NED	NZ	SWI	US	US Dance	Certifications	Album
"Showing Out (Get Fresh at the Weekend)"	1986	3	12	1	18	1	—	1	8	1	78	1	BPI: Silver	F.L.M.
"Respectable"	1987	1	1	1	14	1	2	1	1	1	—	1	BPI: Gold	F.L.M.
"F.L.M."	1987	7	19	7	—	17	4	11	7	16	—	—		F.L.M.
"I'm the One Who Really Loves You" (US only)	1987	—	—	—	—	—	—	—	—	—	—	11		F.L.M.
"That's the Way It Is"	1988	10	28	4	36	18	11	5	10	9	—	9		Non-album single
"More Than Words Can Say" (Scandinavia only)	1989	—	—	—	—	—	—	—	—	—	—	—		Something Special
"Megamix Ninety!" (Continental Europe only)	1990	—	—	—	—	—	—	—	—	—	—	—		Non-album singles
"Where Is Love"	2018	—	—	—	—	—	—	—	—	—	—	—		Non-album singles
"—" denotes a recording that did not chart or was not released in that territory.
