= Light of the World (song) =

1993 single by Kim Appleby

Single by Kim Appleby

from the album Breakaway
- B-side: "Don't Worry"; "Shame"
- Released: 19 July 1993
- Genre: Dance-pop; hi-NRG
- Length: 4:46
- Label: Parlophone
- Songwriters: Kim Appleby; Neal Slateford; Neil Davidge
- Producers: Neal Slateford; Neil Davidge

Kim Appleby singles chronology
"If You Cared" (1991)	"Light of the World" (1993)	"Breakaway" (1993)

Music video
- "Light of the World" on YouTube

"Light of the World" is a song co-written and performed by English singer-songwriter Kim Appleby, released in July 1993 by Parlophone Records as the first single from her second solo album, Breakaway (1993). Originally released on DNA's 1992 album, Taste This with vocals sung by Neil Davidge, producers Neal Slateford and Davidge (DNA) re-recorded the song with Appleby, making minor changes. It reached number 41 on the UK Singles Chart in July 1993, but was more successful on the Music Week Dance Singles chart, peaking at number 15. Additionally, it charted in Germany (58), spending a total of 7 weeks on the German Singles Chart, and in Australia (137). Its accompanying music video was directed by Tim Royes and Russell Young.

== Critical reception ==
Larry Flick from Billboard magazine wrote, "It's a pleasure to hear Kim Appleby back on the boards with 'Light of the World', a rave-etched pop/houser that is ready to dominate peak-hour programs." He remarked that "Kim romps happily, turning in a vocal that has a lot more soul than in the past." Pan-European magazine Music & Media commented, "Okay, it's bubble gum, but don't call Kim dim. She has grown up with her audience and is therefore still relevant to good pop radio." David Quantick from NME said, "Dancefloor musing! Thoughtful disco joy! Tunes! Genius! This is a fine record, not exactly world-destroying but devoid of any crap bits. Kim Appleby — unlike Whitney and Janet and Tina — is the real queen of adult dance pop [...] On the radio, this record will make you happy."

James Hamilton from the Record Mirror Dance Update described it as a "hi-NRG pop canterer" in his weekly dance column. Pete Stanton from Smash Hits gave it a score of four out of five, noting that the singer "marks her return with a lively up-beat pop tune that'll have them singing in the aisles." He added, "This type of song makes you wiggle around the kitchen/lounge/potting shed or wherever you happen to be. The world needs songs like this for when it's sunny outside." In her review of Breakaway, the magazine's Hilary Chapman felt that the song comes close to the "irresistible catchiness" of Appleby's 1990 hit "Don't Worry", remarking that the singer "shines in the uptempo songs of hope and optimism".

== Music video ==
The music video for "Light of the World" was directed by British director Tim Royes and British-American artist Russell Young, and released on 19 July 1993. It was produced by Trudy Bellinger for Expensive Pictures and was shot on 35mm, made as a stylish close-up performance film in black-and-white. In the video, Appleby performs between four pillars in front of a white backdrop. Some scenes also show her lying on a bright white square in the floor or standing in front of a black wall with spots of blinking lights.

== Track listings ==
- 7-inch single, UK
1. "Light of the World" — 4:46
2. "Don't Worry" — 3:30
- 12-inch single, UK and Europe
1. "Light of the World" (Phil Kelsey Remix) — 6:06
2. "Light of the World" (Extended Mix) — 7:13
3. "Light of the World" (Chaps Remix) — 7:04
- CD single, UK
1. "Light of the World" — 4:46
2. "Don't Worry" — 3:30
3. "Shame" — 4:38
4. "Light of the World" — 7:04

== Charts ==
Chart (1993)	Peak position
Australia (ARIA)	137
Germany (GfK)	58
UK Singles (Official Charts)	41
UK Airplay (ERA)	68
UK Dance (Music Week)	15
UK Club Chart (Music Week)	35
