= Breakaway (Kim Appleby album) =

Studio album by Kim Appleby
- Released: 1993
- Studios: The Stable Block; The Townhouse; Maison Rouge; Eel Pie Studios; (London, England): Coach House; (Bristol, England)
- Label: Parlophone
- Producers: Tony Swain; Phil Harding and Ian Curnow; Neal Slateford and Neil Davidge; Dancin' Danny D; James Richards

Kim Appleby chronology
| Kim Appleby (1990) | Breakaway (1993) |

Singles from Breakaway
- 1. "Light of the World" Released: 19 July 1993; 2. "Breakaway" Released: 1 November 1993

Breakaway is the second solo album by English singer Kim Appleby, released in 1993 by Parlophone Records. It includes the singles "Light of the World", which reached number 41 in the UK Singles Chart, and "Breakaway", which reached number 56. The album only received a limited release and it failed to chart. It is Appleby's last studio album to date.

== Critical reception ==
Professional ratings
Review scores
| Source | Rating |
|---|---|
| Smash Hits | 3/5 stars |

In a review for Smash Hits, Hilary Chapman described the album as "perky pop", opining that "The slower numbers need a more powerful voice than [Appleby's], but she shines in the uptempo songs of hope and optimism."

== Track listing ==
| No. | Title | Writer(s) | Length |
|---|---|---|---|
| 1. | "Breakaway" | Kim Appleby | 4:43 |
| 2. | "Missing You" | Dave Dix; K. Holian | 3:56 |
| 3. | "Light of the World" | Appleby; Neil Davidge; Neal Slateford | 4:47 |
| 4. | "Love Will Find a Way" | Lionel Richie; Greg Phillinganes | 4:42 |
| 5. | "Strong Love" | Appleby; Danny D; Paul Taylor | 4:12 |
| 6. | "Loving You Boy" | Appleby; Tony Swain | 4:51 |
| 7. | "The Tables Have Turned" | Appleby; Craig Logan; Nicky Graham | 3:40 |
| 8. | "I'm Not Your Property" | Appleby; Logan | 4:49 |
| 9. | "Good to Me" | Appleby; Logan; Melanie Appleby | 3:55 |
| 10. | "That's Life" | Appleby; Logan; Graham | 4:16 |
| 11. | "Everybody Needs Someone" | Appleby; Logan | 5:01 |
| 12. | "Little Child" | Appleby; Logan | 4:12 |

== Personnel ==
Adapted from the album's liner notes.

Musicians

The following musicians performed on the album, though no specific role is listed in the liner notes:

- Tony Swain
- Steve Byrd
- James Richards
- Bill Liesegang
- Ian Curnow
- Phil Harding
- Neil Davidge
- Neal Slateford
- Chris Goulstone
- Paul Taylor
- Tim Sanders
- Roddy Lorimer
- Richard Edwards
- Will Gregory
- Dave Ford
- Gareth Brady
- Tessa Niles
- Sonia Jones
- Elvis Chalmers
- Juliet Roberts
- Jane Eugene
- Beverley Skeete
- Dancin' Danny D

Technical

- All tracks produced and mixed by Tony Swain, except:
  - Track 1 additional production and remix by Phil Harding and Ian Curnow
  - Track 3 produced and mixed by Neal Slateford and Neil Davidge
  - Track 5 produced and mixed by Dancin' Danny D
  - Track 7 additional production and remix by James Richards
- Mastered by Tim Young
- Recording engineers & assistants: James Richards, Jeremy Allon, Andy Allan, Ren Swan, Richard Lengyel, Chris Bandy, Paul Stevens
- Recorded at The Stable Block, The Townhouse, Maison Rouge, Eel Pie (London, England) & Coach House (Bristol, England)
- Mixed at The Stable Block, Strongroom, Sarm East, Eel Pie, Select Sounds (London, England)
- Laurence Stevens – sleeve design & typography
- Kate Garner – photography
