= Tell Me Tomorrow =

Tell Me Tomorrow may refer to:

- Tell Me Tomorrow (album), 1985, by Angela Bofill
- "Tell Me Tomorrow", a song from Smokey Robinson's 1982 album, Yes It's You Lady
- "Tell Me Tomorrow", a 1986 song by Desiree Heslop
- "Tell Me Tomorrow", a song from Karyn White's 1988 eponymous debut album
- "Tell Me Tomorrow", a 2011 song by Sierra Hull
