= Princess (Princess album) =

Studio album by Princess
- Released: 5 May 1986
- Recorded: 1984–85
- Studio: PWL Studios
- Genre: Pop; dance-pop; soul
- Length: 55:49
- Label: Supreme
- Producer: Stock Aitken Waterman

Princess chronology
Princess (1986)	All for Love (1987)

Singles from Princess
- 1. "Say I'm Your Number One" Released: 26 July 1985; 2. "After the Love Has Gone" Released: November 1985; 3. "I'll Keep on Loving You" Released: February 1986; 4. "Tell Me Tomorrow" Released: July 1986; 5. "In the Heat of a Passionate Moment" Released: September 1986

Professional ratings
Review scores
Source	Rating
AllMusic	3/5 stars

Princess is the debut studio album by the English pop singer Princess, released in April 1986 by Supreme Records.

The album was produced by British record producing trio Stock Aitken Waterman in 1984 to 1985, after Princess became acquainted with them as a backing singer for Brilliant. The album featured mainly pop and dance-pop music, but featured influences from rock, soul and reggae music. All of the tracks were written by S.A.W. aside from "Just a Teaze" which was written by Princess and her brother and manager Donovan; who went uncredited.

The album produced by Stock Aitken Waterman, and it peaked at No. 15 on the UK Albums Chart and at No. 81 in Australia. It was certified Silver in the UK by the British Phonographic Industry (BPI).

The album spawned five singles; four of which reached the UK Top 40; "Say I'm Your Number One", (#7), "After the Love Has Gone" (#28), "I'll Keep on Loving You" (#16) and "Tell Me Tomorrow" (#34). These singles all had music videos, and are Princess' only Top 40 entries.

The fourth single, "Tell Me Tomorrow" had been tied to the soundtrack of Knights & Emeralds, and did not end up making its money back. Therefore, the final single, "In the Heat of a Passionate Moment" had minimal marketing and only reached #74. Princess had had minimal input into the song's remixes and production, and as a result she left S.A.W. and Supreme in November 1986 following tensions. She then signed onto Polydor for her sophomore album.

== Track listing ==
Original LP version

All tracks are written by Stock/Aitken/Waterman; except where indicated.

Side one
No.	Title	Length
1.	"In the Heat of a Passionate Moment"	7:18
2.	"I'll Keep On Loving You"	7:15
3.	"After the Love Has Gone"	3:43
4.	"Say I'm Your Number One"	3:29

Side two
No.	Title	Writer(s)	Length
5.	"If It Makes You Feel Good"		6:03
6.	"Tell Me Tomorrow"		4:31
7.	"Anytime's the Right Time"		4:43
8.	"Just a Teaze"	Princess	3:39

Standard CD / cassette version

All tracks are written by Stock/Aitken/Waterman; except where indicated.

No.	Title	Writer(s)	Length
1.	"In the Heat of a Passionate Moment"		7:47
2.	"I'll Keep On Loving You"		7:27
3.	"After the Love Has Gone"		3:50
4.	"Say I'm Your Number One"		3:38
5.	"After the Love Has Gone (DJ Bad Mix)"		8:00
6.	"If It Makes You Feel Good"		6:13
7.	"Tell Me Tomorrow"		4:40
8.	"Anytime's the Right Time"		4:42
9.	"Just a Teaze"	Princess	3:45
10.	"After the Dub Has Gone (Dub mix)"		5:43

== Charts ==
Chart (1986)	Peak position
Australia (Kent Music Report)	81
Dutch Albums (Album Top 100)	53
German Albums (Offizielle Top 100)	32
New Zealand Albums (RMNZ)	7
Norwegian Albums (VG-lista)	11
Swedish Albums (Sverigetopplistan)	12
Swiss Albums (Schweizer Hitparade)	15
UK Albums (OCC)	15
