= Kim Appleby (album) =

Studio album by Kim Appleby
- Released: November 29, 1990
- Recorded: 1988–1990
- Genres: Pop; R&B
- Label: Parlophone
- Producers: Pete Schwier; Craig Logan; George DeAngelis

Kim Appleby chronology
Kim Appleby (1990)	Breakaway (1993)

Singles from Kim Appleby
- 1. "Don't Worry" Released: 22 October 1990; 2. "G.L.A.D" Released: 28 January 1991; 3. "Mama" Released: May 1991; 4. "If You Cared" Released: October 1991

Professional ratings
Review scores
Source	Rating
Music Week	(favorable)
NME	5/10

Kim Appleby is the debut solo album by English singer Kim Appleby, formerly one half of duo Mel and Kim. It features the singles "Don't Worry" (UK No. 2), "G.L.A.D" (UK No. 10), "Mama" (UK No. 19) and "If You Cared" (UK No. 44). The track "I'll Be There" received a music video, but was not promoted as a commercial single.

Following the death of her sister Mel in January 1990, with the aid of her then-boyfriend, ex-Bros bassist Craig Logan, Kim launched a solo career with much of the album composed of songs co-written with Mel, for what was intended to be the next Mel and Kim album. The sisters had teased "If You Cared" on Wogan as early as April 1988, singing the track a capella.

While primarily a pop and R&B record, some of the tracks feature funk influences like "If You Cared" and "Dodgy People". Other songs like "G.L.A.D.", "Dodgy People" and also "If You Cared" have rocky basslines and drum beats.

== Track listing ==
All tracks written by Kim Appleby, Craig Logan and Melanie Appleby, except where noted.

No.	Title	Writer(s)	Length
1.	"Don't Worry"	K. Appleby; Logan	3:38
2.	"Mama"		4:18
3.	"If You Cared"	K. Appleby; M. Appleby	4:09
4.	"Downtown Clown"	K. Appleby; M. Appleby; Chris Sutton	4:20
5.	"I'll Be There"	K. Appleby; M. Appleby	4:30
6.	"G.L.A.D"		3:24
7.	"Hey You"		3:44
8.	"What Did I Do Wrong?"		3:45
9.	"Dodgy People"		2:56
10.	"Teach Me"		4:49

== Charts ==
Chart (1990–91)	Peak position
Australian Albums Chart	159
Austrian Albums Chart	30
Dutch Albums Chart	65
German Albums Chart	45
Swedish Albums Chart	24
Swiss Albums Chart	36
UK Albums Chart	23

== Certifications ==
Region	Certification	Certified units/sales
United Kingdom (BPI)	Gold	100,000^{^}
^{^} Shipments figures based on certification alone.

== Personnel ==
Credits are adapted from the album's liner notes.

- Kim Appleby – vocals, writing
- Craig Logan – production, writing
- Mel Appleby – writing
- Pete Schwier – production, backing vocals, drums
- George DeAngelis – production, drums, keyboards
- Mae McKenna – backing vocals
- Miriam Stockley – backing vocals
- Paul Spong – brass
- Richard Edwards – brass
- Roddy Lorimer – brass
- Simon Clarke – brass
- Bill Leisengang – guitar
- Steve Bird – guitar
- Brinsley Forde – rap
- KIC Management – management
- Paul White – management
- Cindy Palmano – photography
- Mike Owen – photography
