= Girls@Play =

British girl group

Background information
- Origin: London, England
- Genres: Pop; dance-pop
- Years active: 2000–2001
- Members: Vicky Dowdall; Lisa-Jayne White; Rita Simons; Lynsey Shaw; Shelley Nash

Girls@Play were a British five-piece girl group from London formed in 2000, consisting of Vicky Dowdall, Lisa-Jay White, Rita Simons, Lynsey Shaw and Shelley Nash. They were signed to GSM Records and produced by Stock & Aitken (Mike Stock and Matt Aitken).

Each member of the group played a different character in their music videos. Dowdall played a cowgirl, White an executive, Simons a mechanic, Shaw a New York City traffic cop and Nash a pilot. This gimmick led to Girls@Play being described as the female version of the Village People.

== History ==
The group released two singles: "Airhead" on 12 February 2001 and a cover version of "Respectable", originally by Mel and Kim, on 1 October 2001. "Airhead" reached number 18 on the UK Singles Chart on 18 February 2001, while "Respectable" reached number 29 on 7 October 2001. They also supported Hear'Say and Steps on their arena tours in 2000 and 2001.

The announcement of Girls@Play's disbanding was made on 18 November 2001.

=== Possible reunion ===
In January 2014, it was announced that the group's management were in talks to reform the group. They were also in discussion to reunite the group for the second series of The Big Reunion; however, the group have never materialised since. Rita Simons hinted the group may reunite in the future. In March 2016, it was announced that the group were again in talks about reforming, but nothing came of it.

In 2019, Girls@Play again came to the streaming service Spotify with previously unreleased material from their unreleased album, including "When Love Takes Over You", "Outta My Head", "Forget About Love", "Everything I Need", and "Brand New Car".

== Members ==
- Victoria "Vicky" Dowdall (born 23 January 1979 Gateshead, Tyne and Wear)
  Vicky Dowdall grew up in Heworth, Gateshead and studied at Reavley Theatre School in Gateshead. In 1999, she was one of three session singers recruited by Pete Waterman to sing on a remake of "That's What Love Can Do" credited to Toutes Les Filles. Upon Girls@play's dissolution, Dowdall joined her schoolfriend Camilla Romestrand to form a pop duo originally known as Neway and subsequently as Honeytrap, Honeybeat, and in 2003 - taking a more rock music focus - Purple Patch. Eventually Dowdall moved into artist management founding VDM Management based in London.
- Shelley Nash (born 13 January 1978)
  A professional singer from age 11, Shelley Nash formed Friday with Nash and Simons upon Girls@Play's disbanding. She earned a BMus honors degree from the Guildhall School of Music and Drama in 2005 and focus her career on classical music.
- Lynsey Shaw (born 15 June 1980) Loughborough Leics.)
  Lynsey Shaw studied fashion in Loughborough and London before making singing the focus of her career. Subsequent to Girls@Play disbanding, she took part in the 2002 televised auditions to replace Kym Marsh in Hear'Say, being eliminated in second place. Shaw made a 2010 move to Los Angeles where she ran a boutique record label, Big Finish Records.
- Rita Simons (born 10 March 1977, in Whipps Cross, London)
  Upon Girls@Play's disbanding, Simons joined Nash and White to form Friday, then in 2002 joined a new girl group named Charli. In 2002, Simons ended her singing career to focus on acting and portrayed the character Roxy Mitchell on the BBC soap opera EastEnders.
- Lisa Jane "Lisa-Jay" White (born 23 May 1979)
  After joining Simons and Nash to form the group Friday upon Girls@Play's disbanding, Lisa-Jay White has evidently retired from performing.

== Discography ==
=== Singles ===
List of singles, with selected chart positions
Title	Year	Peak chart positions	
Title	Year	UK	AUS
"Airhead"	2001	18	52
"Respectable"	2001	29	—
