= Corsica Coachworks =

British coachbuilding business

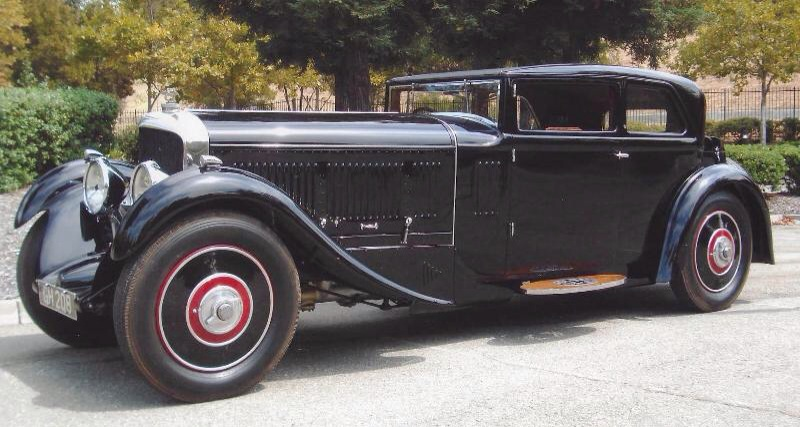
Bentley Speed Six (1930)

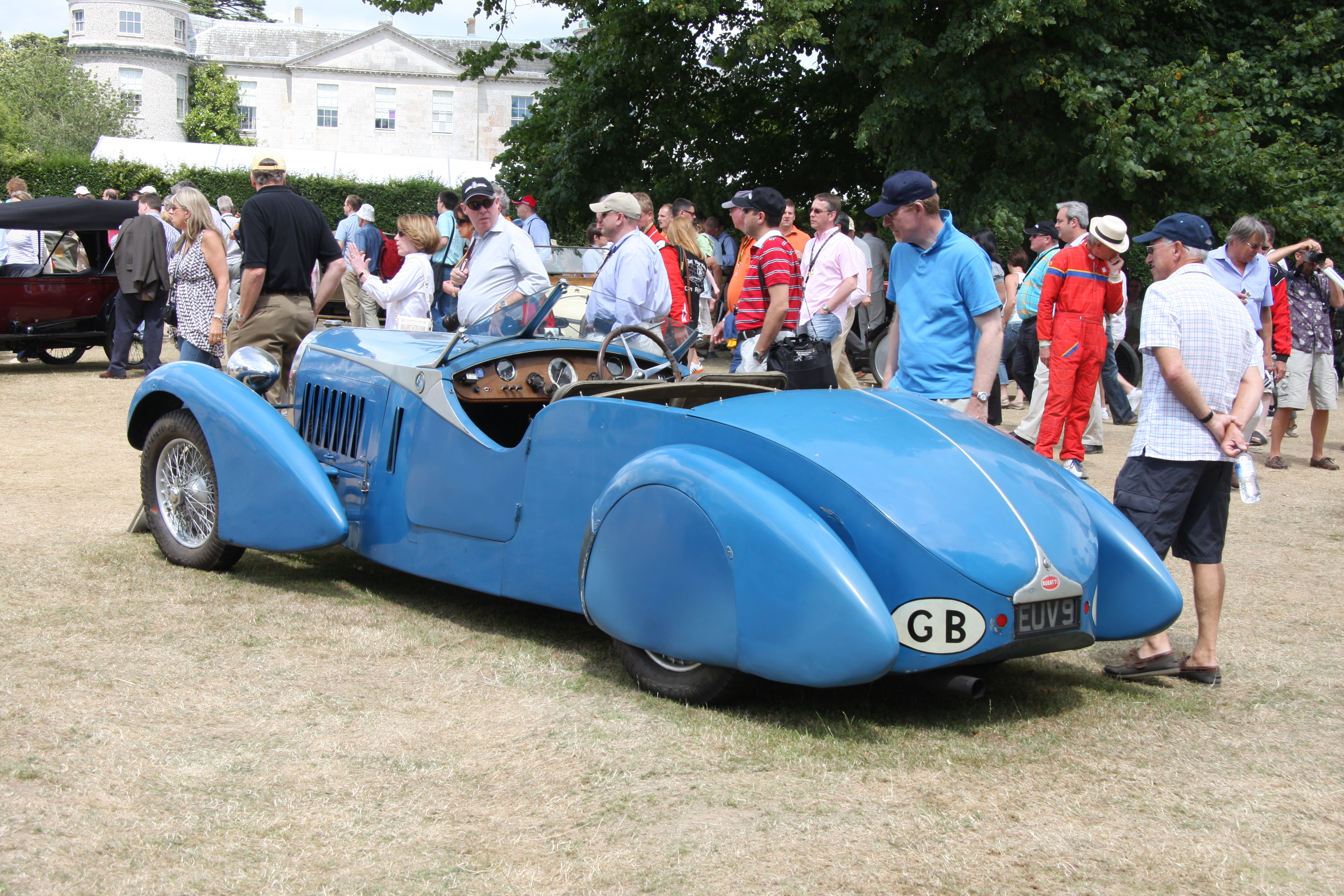
Bugatti 57T (1935)

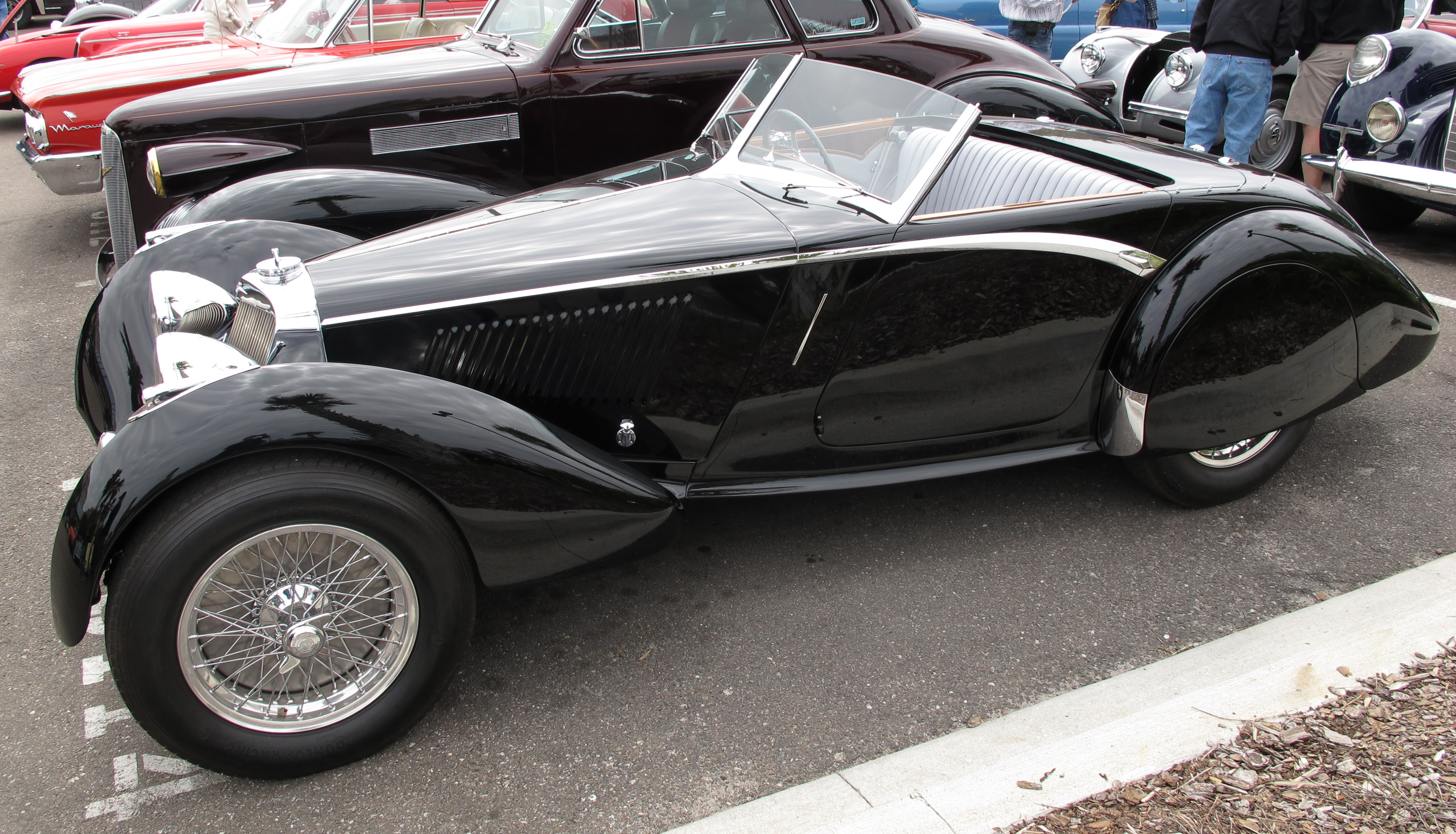
1937 Squire Corsica Short-Chassis Roadster

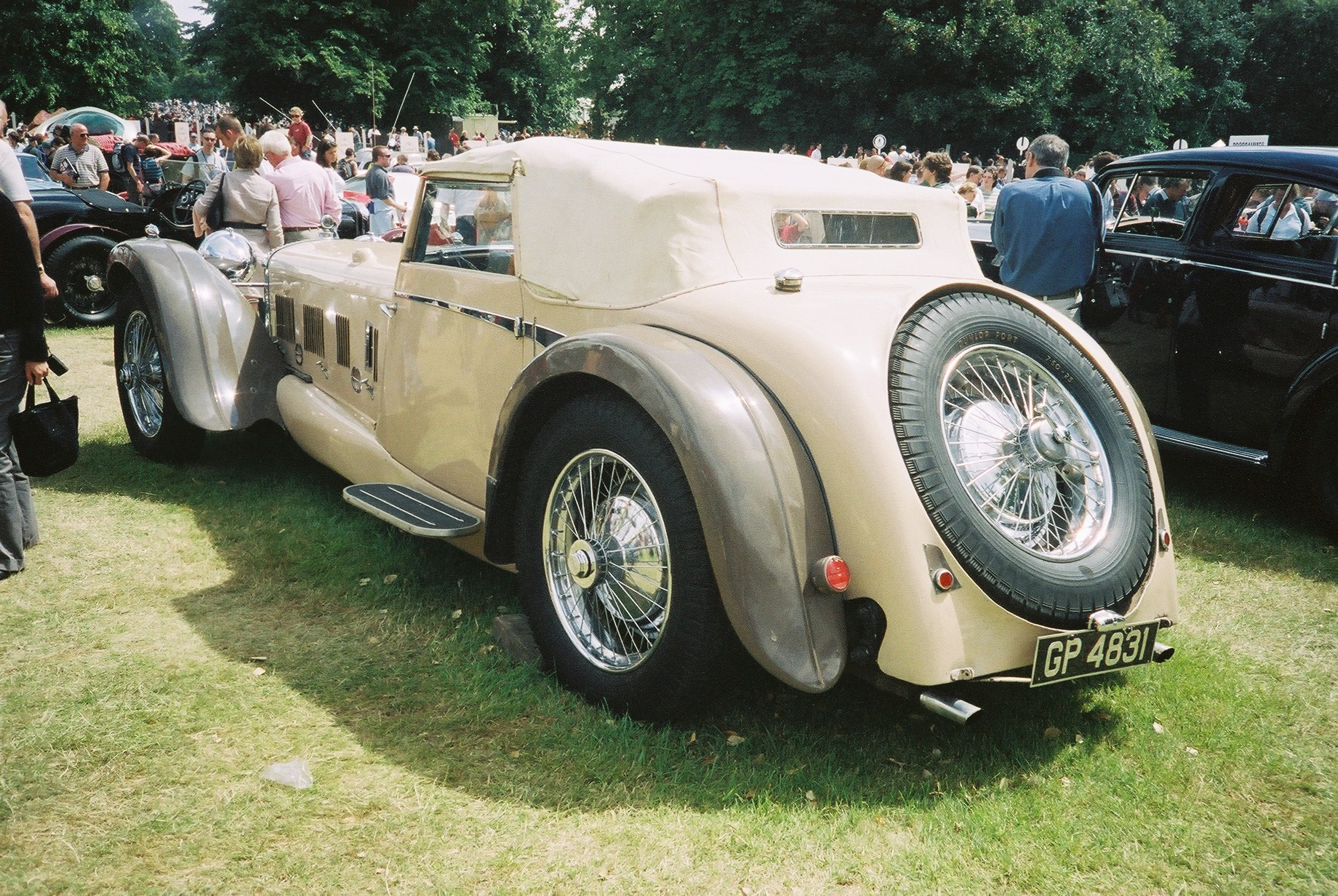
Low-chassis Daimler double-six 50 hp 4-seater drophead coupé (1931) by Corsica chassis modified by Reid Railton at Thomson & Taylor Ltd

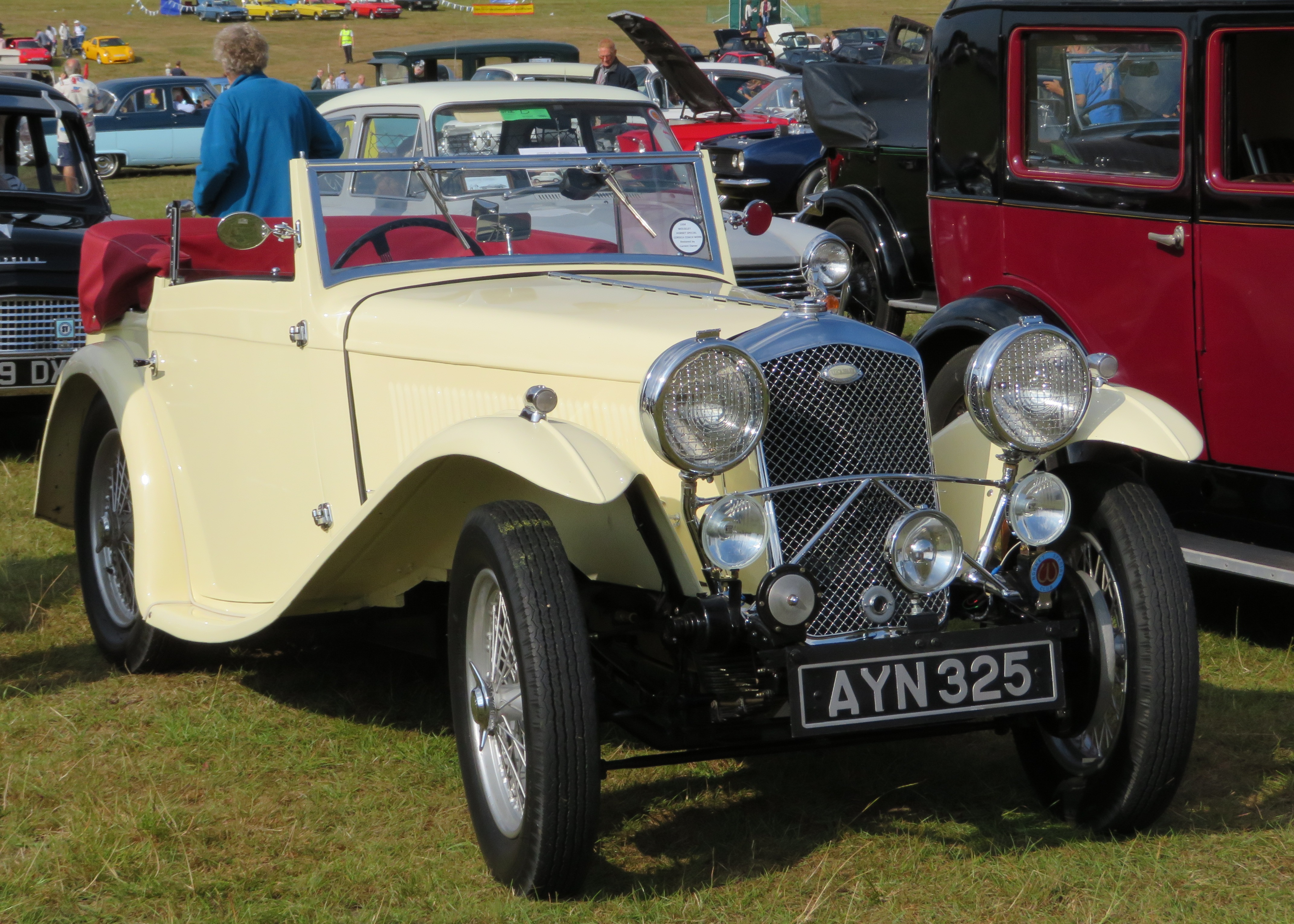
Wolseley Hornet Special bodied by Corsica Coach Works (1934)

Corsica Coachworks was a small British coachbuilding business founded in 1920 just after World War I. They were builders of bespoke car bodies, employing no in-house designer. They realised customers' designs for them; almost every Corsica body is unique.

== History ==
Corsica Coachworks was run by Charles Henry Stammers (1884-1945), his brothers-in-law Joseph and Robert Lee, and Albert Wood. The company name referred to the address of its original premises in Corsica Street, Highbury (Islington, North London). After a few years the business relocated further out of town to an alleyway off The Broadway, Cricklewood (Northwest London). Throughout its existence Corsica Coachworks remained small, never employing more than 20 people.

== Products ==
Most Corsica bodies were fitted to the more sporting types of car, with bodies produced for Daimler, Bentley, Bugatti, Alfa Romeo, British Salmson, Frazer Nash, Humber, Lea-Francis, Rolls-Royce and Wolseley models.

At least 14 Bugatti Type 57s were furnished with Corsica bodies. One of the most notable Corsica bodied Type 57 cars was made using a chassis with parts from a famous Bugatti racing car. Bugatti was known for reusing and re-purposing chassis from their racing cars, then shipping the bare chassis to a customer for a new custom body. The Corsica Bugatti Type 57 Surbaisse 3.3-Litre Four-Seat Sports (1937) was made with an English style sporting body, completely unlike the typical Type 57 sporting bodies from continental European coachbuilders. And the chassis rails have been identified as the very same parts used in a Le Mans Type 57 "Tank" Streamliner.

Just as the business was closed at the beginning of the Second World War, the company completed a Rolls-Royce limousine for Princess Marie Louise "and there may have been a few others like it".

== Design ==
Every body would have been unique but a few dealers required short runs of a particular shape. If the owner's ideas on a body shape were too unformed, a contract draughtsman would be called in. The foreman body maker, Bert Skinner, would draw the entire body on plywood hanging on the wall including full-scale side views. After the body's frame had been built, the sheet aluminium or Dural would be shaped around it. Wings (mudguards) would be first outlined freehand in wire, then metal shaped to fit.

== Legacy ==
The two most important principals, C. H. Stammers and Joseph Lee, died during World War II. Their premises were sold to S Smith & Sons. Robert (Dick) Lee moved to coachbuilders Alpe & Saunders in Kew, then formed FLM Panelcraft in High Street, Putney, moving later to Battersea (Fry, Lee, McNally). They made the bodies for HWM cars, the famous Gulbenkian taxi and the Tulipwood Hispano-Suiza.
