= Showing Out (Get Fresh at the Weekend) =

1986 single by Mel and Kim

Single by Mel and Kim

from the album F.L.M.
- B-side: "System"
- Released: 4 September 1986
- Genre: House
- Length: 3:33
- Label: Supreme
- Songwriter: Stock Aitken Waterman
- Producer: Stock Aitken Waterman

Mel and Kim singles chronology
"Showing Out (Get Fresh at the Weekend)" (1986)	"Respectable" (1987)

Music video
- "Showing Out (Get Fresh at the Weekend)" on YouTube

Alternative cover

"Showing Out (Get Fresh at the Weekend)" is a song by English pop duo Mel and Kim, released as their debut single in September 1986. The song became a chart hit in the UK, peaking at number three on the UK Singles Chart and reaching number one in four European countries.

== Background ==
The single's B-side, "System", was originally intended to be the duo's debut release, but after getting to know the sisters, Pete Waterman felt that the song was too soft for their personalities and halted the single's pressing. Mike Stock then wrote "Showing Out (Get Fresh at the Weekend)" for the duo, influenced by the Chicago garage house sound. "It became very clear that the tracks were being written around us, for us, and they were feeding off us," Kim Appleby said of the creative process with Stock Aitken Waterman after "System" was replaced by "Showing Out".

The image that Mel and Kim projected in the song's video and on the second version of the single sleeve was decided when Kim wore a hat and harem pants to an appearance at London nightclub The Hippodrome. Supreme Records managing director Nick East decided on the spot that her look would be used to define the act. "He looked at me and he said that's the image," Kim said. The synthesised male voice performing middle 8 bridge section of "Showing Out" was revealed to be Mike Stock by Kim Appleby, during a series she presented with Midge Ure for BBC Four called, Smashing Hits! The 80s Pop Map of Britain and Ireland.

== Critical reception ==
In a review published in Record Mirror, James Hamilton complimented "the tightly chanted "house"-tempoed 0-119 3/4 bpm topside [which] has a catchy "get fresh at the week-end" hookline".

== Impact and legacy ==
Retrospectively, in 2021, British magazine Classic Pop ranked "Showing Out (Get Fresh at the Weekend)" at number three on their list of the "Top 40 Stock Aitken Waterman Songs". In 2023, Alexis Petridis of The Guardian listed the song at number three in his "Stock Aitken Waterman's 20 greatest songs – ranked!", adding: "A pop-facing response to early house music, minimal and slightly disjointed, it's more a series of hooks strung together than a song, but it really works." In 2025, Thomas Edward of Smooth Radio ranked the song eighth in his list of "Stock Aitken Waterman's 15 greatest songs, ranked".

== Chart performance ==
The song experienced minor success on the US Hot 100. However, it peaked at number three on the UK Singles Chart in November 1986 and was certified silver by the British Phonographic Industry (BPI) for sales exceeding 250,000 copies. "Showing Out (Get Fresh at the Weekend)" reached number one in Belgium, the Netherlands, Switzerland, and West Germany.

== Track listings ==
UK 7-inch (SUPE 107)

1. "Showing Out"
2. "System" (House mix [edit]) – 3:47

UK 12-inch (SUPE T 107 / RCA PT 40990)

1. "Showing Out" (Extended mix)
2. "System" (House mix) – 9:00

UK 12-inch remix (SUPE TX 107)

1. "Showing Out" (The Mortgage mix)
2. "System" (House mix) – 9:00

UK 12-inch remix (SUPE TZ 107)

1. "Showing Out" (The Freehold mix)
2. "System" (House mix) – 9:00

== Charts ==
=== Weekly charts ===
Weekly chart performance for "Showing Out (Get Fresh at the Weekend)"
Chart (1986–1987)	Peak position
Australia (Australian Music Report)	12
Austria (Ö3 Austria Top 40)	12
Belgium (Ultratop 50 Flanders)	1
Belgium (Ultratop 40 Wallonia)	1
Europe (European Hot 100 Singles)	8
Europe (European Airplay Top 50)	6
Finland (The Official Finnish Charts)	8
France (SNEP)	18
Italy (Musica e dischi)	8
Italy Airplay (Music & Media)	8
Luxembourg (Radio Luxembourg)	5
Netherlands (Dutch Top 40)	1
Netherlands (Single Top 100)	1
New Zealand (Recorded Music NZ)	8
Switzerland (Schweizer Hitparade)	1
UK Singles (OCC)	3
UK Dance (Music Week)	1
US Billboard Hot 100	78
US Dance Club Songs (Billboard) with "System"	1
US Dance Singles Sales (Billboard) with "System"	1
US Hot R&B/Hip-Hop Songs (Billboard)	23
US Cash Box Top 100	91
West Germany (GfK)	1

=== Year-end charts ===
1986 year-end chart performance for "Showing Out (Get Fresh at the Weekend)"
Chart (1986)	Position
UK Singles (OCC)	43
UK Dance (Music Week)	36

1987 year-end chart performance for "Showing Out (Get Fresh at the Weekend)"
Chart (1987)	Position
Australia (Australian Music Report)	42
Belgium (Ultratop)	8
Europe (European Hot 100 Singles)	31
Netherlands (Dutch Top 40)	11
Netherlands (Single Top 100)	16
New Zealand (RIANZ)	10
Switzerland (Schweizer Hitparade)	11
US 12-inch Singles Sales (Billboard)	7
US Dance Club Play (Billboard)	1
West Germany (Media Control)	13

== Certifications ==
Certifications and sales for "Showing Out (Get Fresh at the Weekend)"
Region	Certification	Certified units/sales
Netherlands (NVPI)	Gold	75,000^{^}
United Kingdom (BPI)	Silver	250,000
^{^} Shipments figures based on certification alone.
