= F.L.M. (song) =

Single by Mel and Kim

from the album F.L.M.
- Released: 29 June 1987
- Genre: Dance-pop
- Length: 3:55
- Label: Supreme
- Songwriter: Stock Aitken Waterman
- Producer: Stock Aitken Waterman

Mel and Kim singles chronology
"Respectable" (1987)	"F.L.M." (1987)	"I'm the One Who Really Loves You" (1987)

Music video
- "F.L.M." on YouTube

"F.L.M." is a song by English pop duo Mel and Kim, released as their third single in 1987. It was written and produced by Stock Aitken Waterman, and peaked at number seven on the UK Singles Chart. The song is the title track on their debut album and was remixed for its single release. "F.L.M." would be the penultimate international single released by the duo.

== Writing ==
The song title is an acronym for "fun, love and money", but was actually a play on the sisters' frequent use of the expression "fucking lovely mate" during the recording sessions for the album.

== Music video ==
Due to Mel being diagnosed with a recurrence of cancer in June 1987, the duo did not appear in the promotional music video for the song. Instead, a number of versions of the clip were compiled, variously using footage of the sisters' live performance of "F.L.M" and the music videos for "Showing Out (Get Fresh at the Weekend)" and "Respectable", with all cuts featuring a male actor playing the role of a detective, and string puppets resembling the duo.

Kim Appleby said she was "devastated" by the finished video, having not been consulted on its contents, and only seeing it for the first time when it was aired on TV. Kim, who said that her sister Mel was equally dissatisfied with the video, added that she would have preferred that no video was released at all. Supreme Records head Nick East described the video as a "mistake".

== Critical reception ==
In a review published in Smash Hits, Lola Borg deemed "F.L.M." as "another disco delight" with a sound typically of the duo.

== Chart performance ==
"F.L.M." entered the UK singles chart at number 16 on 11 July 1987, then climbed to number seven where it stayed for another week, and remained on the chart for 11 weeks. In Ireland, the single charted for five weeks and peaked at number four. It was also a top ten hit in the Flanders region of Belgium and Denmark where it reached number seven and ten, respectively, missed the top ten by one and two places in the Netherlands and Finland, and peaked within the top 20 in Switzerland and Germany. On the Pan-Eurochart Hot 100 single charts established by the Music & Media magazine, it debuted at number 26 on 18 July 1987, reached number eight in its fourth week, and totaled ten weeks on the chart. It received some airplay, thus charted for seven weeks on the European Airplay Top 50, with a peak at number 14 in its third week. Outside Europe, "F.L.M." was a top ten hit in New Zealand, where it peaked at number seven with an eight-week chart trajectory, and reached the top 20 in Australia, culminating at number 19 on 27 September 1987.

== Track listings ==
7-inch (SUPE 113)

1. "F.L.M."
2. "F.L.M." (Instrumental/Dub mix fade)

12-inch (SUPE T 113)

1. "F.L.M." (Extended mix)
2. "F.L.M." (Club mix)
3. "F.L.M." (Dub mix/Sonic remix)

12-inch picture disc (SUPE TP 113)

1. "F.L.M." (Extended mix)
2. "F.L.M." (Club mix)
3. "F.L.M." (Dub mix/Sonic remix)

12-inch remix (SUPE TX 113)

1. "F.L.M." (Two Grooves Under One Nation remix/Chic Le Freak mix)
2. "F.L.M." ([Two Grooves Under One Nation] dub mix)

Cassette single (CSUPE113)

1. "F.L.M." (Auto mix)
2. "Showing Out/Respectable" Megamix
3. "F.L.M." (7-inch version)

== Charts ==
=== Weekly charts ===
Weekly chart performance
Chart (1987)	Peak position
Australia (Australian Music Report)	19
Belgium (Ultratop 50 Flanders)	7
Denmark (IFPI)	10
Europe (Eurochart Hot 100)	8
Europe (European Airplay Top 50)	14
Finland (Suomen virallinen lista)	12
Ireland (IRMA)	4
Luxembourg (Radio Luxembourg)	2
Netherlands (Dutch Top 40)	10
Netherlands (Single Top 100)	11
New Zealand (Recorded Music NZ)	7
Switzerland (Schweizer Hitparade)	16
UK Singles (OCC)	7
UK Dance (Music Week)	2
West Germany (GfK)	17

=== Year-end charts ===
Year-end chart performance
Chart (1987)	Position
UK Singles (OCC)	77

== Parody ==
In their 1988 song parodying the formulaic music of Stock Aitken Waterman, "This Is the Chorus", Morris Minor and the Majors joked that "F.L.M." stood for "fun, love, and monotony."
