= Don't Worry (Kim Appleby song) =

1990 single by Kim Appleby

Single by Kim Appleby

from the album Kim Appleby
- Released: 22 October 1990
- Genre: Dance-pop
- Length: 3:33
- Label: Parlophone
- Songwriters: Craig Logan; Kim Appleby; George DeAngelis
- Producers: Pete Schwier; George DeAngelis

Kim Appleby singles chronology
"Don't Worry" (1990)	"G.L.A.D." (1991)

Music video
- "Don't Worry HD Music Video" on YouTube

"Don't Worry" is the debut solo single of English musician Kim Appleby from her self-titled debut solo album (1990). This was Appleby's first solo-single after the death of her sister Mel. The song addresses the process of getting over being heartbroken. With the aid of her then boyfriend, ex-Bros bassist Craig Logan, Kim launched a solo career with much of her debut solo album composed of songs co-written with Mel, for what was intended to be the next Mel and Kim album. The new album showed Appleby in a more prominent, soulful role, although the tongue-in-cheek humour of Mel & Kim still remained.

Released on 22 October 1990 by Parlophone, the song reached number two on the UK Singles Chart in November 1990 and entered the top 40 throughout Europe. The single was also one of the best played singles on both IR stations and the BBC for a month. Additionally it peaked within the top 10 in Austria, Belgium, Finland, Germany, Ireland, the Netherlands and Switzerland. On the Eurochart Hot 100, "Don't Worry" reached number seven in December 1990. Outside Europe, the single charted in Zimbabwe, peaking at number one in January 1991. The accompanying music video was directed by Liam Kan, and received heavy rotation on MTV Europe in February 1991.

== Critical reception ==
Pan-European magazine Music & Media declared the song as a "hit-bound record with a strong Motown (Supremes) feel. Co-written by Appleby and former Bros member Craig Logan, this is an up-tempo, cheerful and well produced song." Selina Webb from Music Week felt this release "is tinged with considerable sadness, as it should have been performed by a duo." She added that it "lacks the SAW magic but stands up as an easily-consumed pop song which should bop its way easily into the charts." R.S. Murthi from New Straits Times said it "sounds so much like Stock/Aitken/Waterman that you're disappointed to discover that it's not their work." Tom Doyle from Smash Hits named it "something of a bouncy singalong SAW-type affair", and complimented Appleby's voice as "consistently strong and tuneful".

== Track listings ==
- CD single
1. "Don't Worry" – 3:33
2. "Don't Worry" (The Phil Chill mix) – 4:37
3. "Don't Worry" (The Stressed Out mix) – 7:51
- 7-inch single
1. "Don't Worry" – 3:31
2. "Don't Worry" (instrumental) – 3:50
- 12-inch single
1. "Don't Worry" (The Stressed Out mix) – 7:52
2. "Don't Worry" (The Phil Chill mix) – 4:36
3. "Don't Worry" (Crypt mix) – 4:54

== Charts ==
=== Weekly charts ===
Weekly chart performance for "Don't Worry"
Chart (1990–1991)	Peak position
Australia (ARIA)	119
Austria (Ö3 Austria Top 40)	9
Belgium (Ultratop 50 Flanders)	2
Belgium (Ultratop 50 Wallonia)	6
Europe (Eurochart Hot 100)	7
Finland (Suomen virallinen lista)	5
France (SNEP)	35
Germany (GfK)	8
Ireland (IRMA)	5
Israel (Israeli Singles Chart)	4
Luxembourg (Radio Luxembourg)	2
Netherlands (Dutch Top 40)	4
Netherlands (Single Top 100)	3
Quebec (ADISQ)	29
Sweden (Sverigetopplistan)	12
Switzerland (Schweizer Hitparade)	6
UK Singles (Official Charts)	2
UK Airplay (Music Week)	1
UK Dance (Music Week)	22
Zimbabwe (ZIMA)	1

=== Year-end charts ===
1990 year-end chart performance for "Don't Worry"
Chart (1990)	Position
UK Singles (OCC)	20

1991 year-end chart performance for "Don't Worry"
Chart (1991)	Position
Belgium (Ultratop)	30
Europe (Eurochart Hot 100)	42
Europe (European Hit Radio)	69
Germany (Media Control)	32
Netherlands (Dutch Top 40)	55
Sweden (Topplistan)	67

== Certifications ==
Certifications for "Don't Worry"
Region	Certification	Certified units/sales
United Kingdom (BPI)	Silver	200,000^{^}
^{^} Shipments figures based on certification alone.

== Release history ==
Release dates and formats for "Don't Worry"
Region	Date	Format(s)	Label(s)	Ref.
United Kingdom	22 October 1990	7-inch vinyl; 12-inch vinyl; CD; cassette	Parlophone	
Australia	10 December 1990	7-inch vinyl; cassette	Parlophone	
