= I'm the One Who Really Loves You =

Single by Mel and Kim

from the album F.L.M.
- Released: 1987
- Genre: Dance-pop
- Length: 3:40 (album version); 6:47 (US mix)
- Label: Atlantic
- Songwriter: Stock Aitken Waterman
- Producer: Stock Aitken Waterman

Mel and Kim singles chronology
"F.L.M." (1987)	"I'm the One Who Really Loves You" (1987)	"That's the Way It Is" (1988)

"I'm the One Who Really Loves You" is a song by English pop duo Mel and Kim from their only studio album, F.L.M. (1987). Although never released internationally as a single, after being subjected to a handful of remixes by Clivillés and Cole and a limited North American release, it reached number eleven on the Dance Club Songs chart.

It was originally recorded and released by British singer Austin Howard in 1986. Both versions were written and produced by Stock Aitken Waterman.

== Track listings ==
US 7-inch (Atlantic 89180)

1. "I'm the One Who Really Loves You" (pop radio mix) – 3:45
2. "I'm the One Who Really Loves You" (hip hop radio mix)

US 12-inch (Atlantic 0–86627)

1. "I'm the One Who Really Loves You" (Stardom Groove club mix) – 5:55
2. "I'm the One Who Really Loves You" (Groove dub) – 5:40
3. "I'm the One Who Really Loves You" (Kick 'N Live mix) – 6:46
4. "I'm the One Who Really Loves You" (Done Properly dub) – 6:06

US 12-inch promo (Atlantic DMD 1124)

1. "I'm the One Who Really Loves You" (Stardom Groove club mix) – 5:55
2. "I'm the One Who Really Loves You" (Groove dub) – 5:40
3. "I'm the One Who Really Loves You" (Pop Radio mix) – 3:45
4. "I'm the One Who Really Loves You" (Kick 'N Live mix) – 6:46
5. "I'm the One Who Really Loves You" (Done Properly dub) – 6:06

=== Austin Howard version ===
7-inch (TEN 97)

1. "I'm the One Who Really Loves You" (7″ version) – 3:35
2. "I'm the One Who Really Loves You" (instrumental) – 3:34

12-inch (TEN 97–12)

1. "I'm the One Who Really Loves You" (extended version) – 6:55
2. "I'm the One Who Really Loves You" (7″ version) – 3:35
3. "I'm the One Who Really Loves You" (instrumental) – 3:34

12-inch remix (TENT 97–12)

1. "I'm the One Who Really Loves You" (extended remix) – 7:39
2. "I'm the One Who Really Loves You" (extended version) – 6:55

== Charts ==
Weekly chart performance for "I'm the One Who Really Loves You"
Chart (1988)	Peak position
US Dance Club Songs (Billboard)	11
