= Being with You =

Being with You may refer to:

- Being with You (album), a 1981 album by Smokey Robinson
- "Being with You" (song), the title track from the album

== See also ==
- "Being with U", a song by Basement Jaxx from the album Remedy
