= 14th National Television Awards =

British awards ceremony in 2008

- Date: 29 October 2008
- Location: Royal Albert Hall, London
- Country: United Kingdom
- Presented by: Various
- Hosted by: Trevor McDonald
- Website: http://www.nationaltvawards.com/

Television/radio coverage
- Network: ITV
- Runtime: 120 minutes

The 14th National Television Awards ceremony was held at the Royal Albert Hall on 29 October 2008. It was the last to be hosted by Sir Trevor McDonald and last to be held at the Albert Hall. David Tennant announced via a live video link from Stratford-upon-Avon that he would be quitting Doctor Who after playing the role of The Doctor for 3 series. He said after winning the Outstanding Drama Performance award:

I've had the most brilliant, bewildering and life-changing time working on Doctor Who, I have loved every day of it. It would be very easy to cling on to the TARDIS console forever and I fear that if I don't take a deep breath and make the decision to move on now, then I simply never will... I don't want to outstay my welcome.

== Awards ==
| Category | Winner | Also nominated |
|---|---|---|
| Outstanding Serial Drama Performance | Matt Littler (Max Cunningham, Hollyoaks) | Lacey Turner (Stacey Slater, EastEnders); Katherine Kelly (Becky McDonald, Coronation Street); Charlotte Bellamy (Laurel Thomas, Emmerdale) |
| Outstanding Drama Performance | David Tennant (The Doctor, Doctor Who) | Philip Glenister (Gene Hunt, Ashes to Ashes); Catherine Tate (Donna Noble, Doctor Who); Alex Walkinshaw (Dale Smith, The Bill); Eva Longoria (Gabrielle Solis, Desperate Housewives) |
| Most Popular Drama; Presented by Sarah, Duchess of York | Doctor Who (BBC One) | The Bill (ITV); Shameless (Channel 4); Desperate Housewives (Channel 4/ABC) |
| Most Popular Serial Drama | EastEnders (BBC One) | Coronation Street (ITV); Emmerdale (ITV); Hollyoaks (Channel 4) |
| Most Popular Entertainment Programme; Presented by Dermot O'Leary and Holly Willoughby | The Paul O'Grady Show (Channel 4) | Ant & Dec's Saturday Night Takeaway (ITV); I'm a Celebrity... Get Me Out of Here! (ITV); Big Brother (Channel 4) |
| Most Popular Entertainment Presenter; Presented by Peter Purves, Valerie Singleton and John Noakes | Ant & Dec | Alan Carr; Justin Lee Collins; Paul O'Grady |
| Most Popular Talent Show; Presented by Paris Hilton | Strictly Come Dancing (BBC One) | Dancing On Ice (ITV); Britain's Got Talent (ITV); The X Factor (ITV) |
| Most Popular Comedy Programme | Benidorm (ITV) | My Family (BBC One); Ugly Betty (Channel 4/ABC); Harry Hill's TV Burp (ITV) |
| Most Popular Factual Programme; Presented by Griff Rhys Jones | Top Gear (BBC Two) | This Morning (ITV); The Apprentice (BBC One); Ramsay's Kitchen Nightmares (Channel 4) |
| Most Popular Newcomer | Rita Simons (Roxy Mitchell, EastEnders) | Georgia Taylor (Ruth Winters, Casualty); Michelle Keegan (Tina McIntyre, Coronation Street); Barry Sloane (Niall Rafferty, Hollyoaks) |
| Special Recognition Award; Presented by Andrew Lloyd Webber | Simon Cowell | |
