= F.L.M. (album) =

Studio album by Mel and Kim
- Released: 13 April 1987
- Recorded: 1986–1987
- Studios: PWL Studios 1 and 2 (London)
- Genres: House; Euro disco; dance-pop; R&B
- Length: 38:09
- Label: Supreme
- Producer: Stock Aitken Waterman

Mel and Kim chronology
F.L.M. (1987)	Something Special (1989)

Singles from F.L.M.
- 1. "Showing Out (Get Fresh at the Weekend)" Released: 4 September 1986; 2. "Respectable" Released: 18 February 1987; 3. "F.L.M." Released: 29 June 1987; 4. "I'm the One Who Really Loves You" Released: 1987 (US)

Professional ratings
Review scores
Source	Rating
AllMusic	2/5 stars
Record Mirror	5/5 stars
Smash Hits	8/10

F.L.M. is the only studio album by English pop duo Mel and Kim, released on 13 April 1987 by Supreme Records. The album peaked at number three on the UK Albums Chart and has been certified platinum by the British Phonographic Industry (BPI). It also reached the top five in Australia, Finland and Switzerland, the 10 in Norway and the top 20 in Germany, the Netherlands and Sweden. Three successful singles are included on the album: "Showing Out" (number three on the UK Singles Chart), "Respectable" (number one) and "F.L.M." (number seven).

== Background and release ==
The album was predominantly written and produced by Stock Aitken Waterman (SAW) and contained a mixture of house-infused productions and downtempo, soulful songs. Supreme Records head Nick East said the original plan was to release "every track" from the album as a single, "like [Michael Jackson's] Thriller", but Mel's cancer diagnosis forced the abandonment of the plan. One track, "I'm the One Who Really Loves You", was originally recorded in 1986 by Austin Howard and was considered for release as the fourth single; however, it was only released in South Africa and North America where it was issued with remixes by Clivillés & Cole. Two other songs from F.L.M. would go on to be recorded by other Stock Aitken Waterman-produced artists; "More Than Words Can Say", which was only released as a single in Scandinavia, was also recorded by Carol Hitchcock and Hazell Dean, while Sinitta and Pepsi and Shirlie both recorded reworked versions of album closer, "Who's Gonna Catch You".

In the United Kingdom, the vinyl LP was issued with either a full colour or monochrome sleeve. US, Canadian, and Japanese pressings had a different sleeve design and track running order to other international releases. In addition, "Feel a Whole Lot Better" was retitled "Whatever It Is" for these territories. A two-disc deluxe edition of the album was released in 2010, including the duo's 1988 single "That's the Way It Is", and its B-side, "You Changed My Life", which were not included on the original release of the album, as well as 7" mixes and extended versions of singles and album tracks.

== Critical reception ==
When reviewing the album, Karen Faux of British magazine Music Week praised "Showing Out (Get Fresh at the Week-end)" and "Respectable" as they "undoubtedly shine brighest, with dancefloor bounce and exuberance", as well as the slower tracks which she deemed not vacuous at all, but criticized "weak and ultimately forgettable vocals". Chris Heath of Smash Hits stated that if "you like wonderfully tacky, totally unpretentious dance music where little catchy snippets of tunes and electronic drums a-clinking and a-clattering are more important than anything else in the world, then you'll simply recognise F.L.M.... as a "masterpiece" of sorts". By contrast, Jonathan Lewis of AllMusic was highly critical of F.L.M., deeming it "one of the more insipid examples of '80s dance-pop" and a "completely forgettable album", which shows in his point of view SAW's "weakest" songwriting and Mel & Kim's "limited vocal ability", a duo he considered "the least talented" artists who collaborated with the SAW team. Retrospectively, in 2018, Mark Elliot of Classic Pop considered F.L.M. as the fifth best album ever produced by SAW.

== Chart performance ==
In the United Kingdom, F.L.M. started at a peak of number three on 25 April 1987, a position it held for consecutive two weeks, and spent 11 weeks in the top ten and a total of 25 weeks in the top 100. It was the 35th best-selling album of 1987 in the country, and earned a platinum disc awarded by the British Phonographic Industry. In Continental Europe, it also reached the top five in Finland and Switzerland, where it peaked at number two and four, respectively; in the latter country, it appeared for nine weeks in the top 30. In Norway, it also attained the top ten, culminating at number seven for two weeks, and charted for ten weeks in the top 20. In addition, it was a top-20 albums in the Netherlands, West Germany and Sweden, with 18 and 11 weeks of charting in the first two nations. On the Pan-European Top 100 Albums chart compiled by Music & Media, it peaked at number ten, and eventually ranked at number 44 on the European year-end chart of 1987. Regarding the Oceanian markets, F.L.M. barely missed the first position in both Australia and New Zealand where it rose until number two. It spent 19 weeks in the NZ Albums Chart, with two weeks at number two in August 1987, behind U2's The Joshua Tree, and nine weeks in the top ten. In this country, it reached the gold status given by the Recorded Music NZ, and featured at number 18 on the year-end chart.

== Track listing ==
Side one

1. "F.L.M." – 3:54
2. "Showing Out (Get Fresh at the Weekend)" – 5:10
3. "Respectable" – 5:42
4. "Feel a Whole Lot Better" aka "Whatever It Is" – 4:27

Side two

1. "I'm the One Who Really Loves You" – 3:39
2. "More Than Words Can Say" – 4:09
3. "System" – 4:09
4. "From a Whisper to a Scream" – 3:25
5. "Who's Gonna Catch You" – 3:35

CD bonus tracks

1. "Showing Out" (Freehold mix) – 4:36
2. "Respectable" (Extra Beats version instrumental) – 6:11

All songs written by Stock Aitken Waterman, except "Who's Gonna Catch You" written by Matt Aitken / Mike Stock / Pete Waterman / Stevie Wonder / Yvonne Wright, and "From a Whisper to a Scream" lyrics by A & A.

=== 2010 reissue ===
The album was reissued as a double CD in the United Kingdom through Cherry Red Records on 18 October 2010. Notably, the first three tracks are the 7" mixes, not the album versions contained on the original release.

Disc one

1. "F.L.M." (7" version) – 3:33
2. "Showing Out" (7" version) – 3:35
3. "Respectable" (7" version) – 3:22
4. "Feel a Whole Lot Better" – 4:27
5. "I'm the One Who Really Loves You" – 3:41
6. "More Than Words Can Say" – 4:09
7. "System" – 4:09
8. "From a Whisper to a Scream" – 3:25
9. "Who's Gonna Catch You?" – 3:35
10. "That's the Way It Is" – 3:27
11. "You Changed My Life" – 3:27
12. "Showing Out (Get Fresh at the Weekend)" (extended version) – 7:15
13. "Respectable" (extended version) – 6:14
14. "F.L.M." (extended version) – 7:50
15. "That's the Way It Is" (extended version) – 6:49
16. "System" (previously unreleased alternative mix) – 3:58
17. "More Than Words Can Say" (previously unreleased extended version) – 6:50

Disc two

1. "Respectable" (Extra Beats Vocal) – 8:09
2. "F.L.M." (Two Grooves Under One Nation remix) – 8:13
3. "I'm the One Who Really Loves You" (Yoyo's 12" mix – previously unreleased) – 6:43
4. "That's the Way It Is" (Acid House Remix) – 7:38
5. "System" (Garage vocal – previously unreleased) – 7:22
6. "Feel a Whole Lot Better" (Yoyo's 12" mix – previously unreleased) – 7:38
7. "Showing Out (Get Fresh at the Weekend)" (The Mortgage mix) – 6:26
8. "That's the Way It Is" (House remix) – 6:42
9. "Respectable" (Shop mix) – 6:17
10. "F.L.M." (Sonic remix) – 6:20
11. "System" (original 12" mix – previously unreleased) – 5:45

== Charts ==
=== Weekly charts ===
Weekly chart performance for F.L.M.
Chart (1987)	Peak position
Australian Albums (Kent Music Report)	2
Dutch Albums (Album Top 100)	12
European Albums (Music & Media)	10
Finnish Albums (Suomen virallinen lista)	2
German Albums (Offizielle Top 100)	16
New Zealand Albums (RMNZ)	2
Norwegian Albums (VG-lista)	7
Swedish Albums (Sverigetopplistan)	20
Swiss Albums (Schweizer Hitparade)	4
UK Albums (Official Charts)	3
Chart (2023)	Peak position
UK Independent Albums (Official Charts)	37

=== Year-end charts ===
Year-end chart performance for F.L.M.
Chart (1987)	Position
Australian Albums (Kent Music Report)	15
European Albums (Music & Media)	44
New Zealand Albums (RMNZ)	18
UK Albums (Gallup)	35

== Certifications ==
Certifications for F.L.M.
Region	Certification	Certified units/sales
Netherlands (NVPI)	Gold	50,000^{^}
New Zealand (RMNZ)	Gold	7,500^{^}
United Kingdom (BPI)	Platinum	300,000^{^}
^{^} Shipments figures based on certification alone.
