= Feline leukomyelopathy =

Feline leukomyelopathy (FLM), is a disorder which affects non-domestic cats. The disorder causes microscopic changes in the brain and spine, causing varying degrees of rear leg weakness and difficulty walking. The disorder was identified in panthers and bobcats in Florida in 2019. As of 2021, the Florida Fish and Wildlife Conservation Commission (FWC), and its collaborators are continuing extensive testing to determine the cause of the disorder.
