= Say I'm Your Number One =

1985 single by Princess

Single by Princess

from the album Princess
- Released: 26 June 1985
- Genre: Pop; R&B
- Length: 3:38
- Label: Supreme
- Songwriter: Stock Aitken Waterman
- Producer: Stock Aitken Waterman

Princess singles chronology
"Let the Night Take the Blame" (1985)	"Say I'm Your Number One" (1985)	"After The Love Has Gone" (1985)

Music video
- "Say I'm Your Number One" on YouTube

"Say I'm Your Number One" (also formatted as "Say I'm Your No. 1") is a song by the English singer Princess, released in 1985 as the lead single from her self-titled debut studio album (1986). Written and produced by Stock Aitken Waterman (SAW), the song peaked at number seven on the UK Singles Chart. In the United States, it reached number 20 on Billboard's Hot Black Singles chart, while it reached the top ten in the UK and several of European and Oceanian countries.

== Background and recording ==
Session singer Desiree Heslop – later to take the stage name Princess – was hired by SAW to workshop some "credible" soul-pop tracks, after distinguishing herself as a backing vocalist on the Brilliant album Kiss The Lips of Life. "I was a singer who had come in to do a job, and had differentiated myself on a part that the other singer wasn't getting", the vocalist remembered of winning over SAW. "So they sent the other lady home."

According to Princess and her brother/manager Don Heslop, SAW provided them with a number of basic, unfinished tracks for them to choose from and to help develop, including one that later became "Say I'm Your Number One". Mike Stock remembers specifically choosing the track for the vocalist, writing "I thought it would be fine for Desiree."

After a conversation between Don Heslop and producer Pete Waterman, the manager says a plan was floated to collaborate on material between them that could potentially garner a record deal. "What he wanted to do, and what I wanted to do seemed to be written by the same author," said Heslop. "We talked about doing something amazing and taking it to the majors."

Waterman recalled of the conversation: "... I'd said that Desiree was only a session singer and has just been paid to sing on something we were working on for Dee C Lee."

Matt Aitken says the track is a very rare example of a song written by SAW that first came together without a particular artist or project in mind. He also added that the song was offered to many A&R representatives and artists, but was rejected as they "hated" it.

When the Princess-fronted version of the record was finished, no major label would pick up it up, and the snub helped inspire the creation of Supreme Records, which released the track and then became an ongoing vehicle for SAW's output. Initial buzz around the track was created by servicing it to pirate radio, and pressing white label copies to create the impression it was an American import.

== Writing ==
Speaking on the genesis of the track, Waterman stated he gave Mike Stock and Matt Aitken a brief to write a song that women could mime to men they were attracted to, as the song was played in nightclubs. Among the guide tracks that influenced production was "Genie" by B.B. & Q. Band. The track marked the first appearance of the fictitious drummer A.Linn, aka Waterman, in the credits.

While Stock Aitken Waterman are solely credited as the writers of the song, Princess says she contributed to the lyrics and structure of the song during the demo process. Despite the track initially being intended for Lee, Princess felt the evolution of the song under her guidance meant it was effectively always hers. "It was always mine because I did the sensibility and the feeling of the song, and how it morphed from the demo," she said. "I was almost entwined in the song – we co-wrote the bridge, and all the BVs were mine, and to a certain extent, Don’s influence."

== Music video ==
The video for the song, which featured the singer journeying around London, was designed to highlight the Britishness of the record by including cultural icons such as double-decker buses, and the singer's bowler hat.

== Impact and legacy ==
Retrospectively, in 2020, Daniel Griffiths of musicradar.com considered "Say I'm Your Number One" as one of the five songs by SAW that producers need to hear, adding that at the time, the trio was "still malleable to whatever new style was arriving in the clubs" and "this US-influenced R'n'B electro groove might come as a SAW surprise". In 2021, British magazine Classic Pop ranked the song number eight in their list of "Top 40 Stock Aitken Waterman songs". In 2023, Alexis Petridis of The Guardian listed the song at number 9 in his "Stock Aitken Waterman's 20 greatest songs – ranked!", describing it as a "mid-tempo electro pop-soul, heavily influenced by the Brooklyn Bronx & Queens Band".

== Chart performance ==
"Say I'm Your Number One" was Princess' biggest hit single, and although it was the first of a run of four hit singles that the artist released with SAW, it proved to be her only top ten entry in her home-country. In the UK, it debuted at number 54 on 3 August 1985 and climbed every week until reaching a peak of number seven for consecutive two weeks; it fell out of the chart after 12 weeks, of which four were spent in the top ten. In Continental Europe, it achieved its highest position in West Germany where it debuted at number 52 on 23 September 1985, rose to number 16 the next week, attained number two in its fifth week, being only beaten by Modern Talking's "Cheri Cheri Lady"; it spent seven weeks in the top ten and 15 weeks on the chart. On the 1985 national year-end chart, it ranked at number 47. "Say I'm Your Number One" also peaked within the top ten in Switzerland and the Netherlands, where it reached number four and number six, respectively, and barely missed the top ten in Ireland and the Flanders region of Belgium where it stalled at numbers 11 and 12. In addition, it was a top 20 hit in Italy, and a top 30 hit in Finland and Austria. On the Pan-European Hot 100 chart established by the Eurotipsheet magazine, it culminated at number ten in its ninth week.

In North America, "Say I'm Your Number One" reached number 20 on the Billboard's Hot Black Singles chart and number 22 on the Dance Club Play chart. It was a hit in Australasia, peaking at number two in New Zealand where it ranked for ten weeks in the top 50, and at number eight in Australia.

== Other uses ==
The music of "Say I'm Your Number One" was interpolated with Bananarama's "A Trick of the Night" for the latter song's Number One Mix, the U.K. single remix, and related variations.

== Track listings ==
- 7-inch single

A. "Say I'm Your Number One" – 3:38
B. "Say I'm Your Number One" (Senza Voce) – 4:30

- 12-inch single

A. "Say I'm Your Number One" (Full Length Version) – 6:20
B1. "Say I'm Your Number One" (Short Version) – 5:42
B2. "Say I'm Your Number One" (Senza Voce) – 3:00

- "After the Love Has Gone / Say I'm Your Number One"

A. "After the Love Had Gone" – 6:48
B. "Say I'm Your Number One" – 6:14

== Charts ==
=== Weekly charts ===
Weekly chart performance for "Say I'm Your Number One"
Chart (1985–1986)	Peak position
Australia (Kent Music Report)	8
Austria (Ö3 Austria Top 40)	29
Belgium (Ultratop 50 Flanders)	12
Europe (European Top 100 Singles)	10
Finland (Suomen virallinen lista)	27
Ireland (IRMA)	11
Italy (Musica e dischi)	20
Luxembourg (Radio Luxembourg)	5
Netherlands (Dutch Top 40)	7
Netherlands (Single Top 100)	6
New Zealand (Recorded Music NZ)	2
Switzerland (Schweizer Hitparade)	4
UK Singles (OCC)	7
US 12-inch Singles Sales (Billboard)	15
US Dance Club Play (Billboard)	22
US Hot Black Singles (Billboard)	20
West Germany (GfK)	2

=== Year-end charts ===
1985 year-end chart performance for "Say I'm Your Number One"
Chart (1985)	Position
Belgium (Ultratop)	58
Netherlands (Dutch Top 40)	63
Netherlands (Single Top 100)	67
West Germany (Media Control)	47

1986 year-end chart performance for "Say I'm Your Number One"
Chart (1986)	Position
Australia (Kent Music Report)	54
