= Fun Little Movies =

Short film production and distribution company

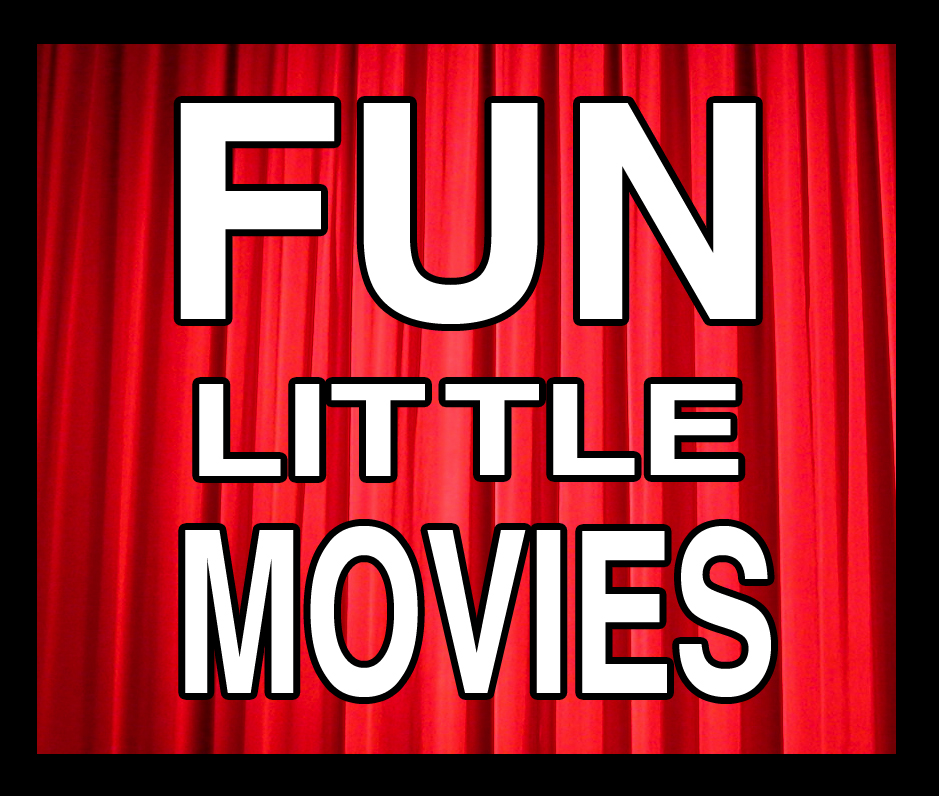
Fun Little Movies

Fun Little Movies (FLM) is a production and distribution company of short films intended for the internet and mobile devices. It was founded in 1988 by Frank Chindamo, currently an adjunct professor at the University of Southern California. Based in Burbank, California, Fun Little Movies was the first U.S. company to produce comedic films for mobile phones worldwide. By the time the company was in development of Psyche 101 in 2004, they had already begun producing shorts promoting internet dating services. In 2007, ROK Entertainment bought controlling interest in FLM, although in 2008 ROK defaulted on their agreement.

== History ==
Fun Little Movies was founded as a short-film company in 1988 and developed interstitial programming for such networks as ShowTime, Comedy Central, PBS, CBS, and Playboy TV.

In 2004, Fun Little Movies became the first U.S. company to produce comedic films for mobile phones worldwide when Mobile Media Labs announced they were to begin distribution of made-for-mobile and made-for-Internet "HowTo" and "Health" related reference videos over a new movie channel to be launched on FLM.

In 2005 Sprint launched Sprint TV as two new independent mobile-TV content providers for the carrier's premier multimedia service offerings by Fun Little Movies. In June 2005, Smartvideo added FLM and E! Entertainment to its mobile video channel line-up. And in December 2005, FLM concluded a deal with the ZVUE family of portable media players to make over 1,000 short films available for download to ZVUE owners.

At the 2006 NATPE convention Fun Little Movies co-sponsored the first annual MoTV Awards and presented the "Fun Little Movies Award for Best Comedy". The winner was Miami 85 by Santa Fe Community College professor Marc Shahboz.

In 2007 HandHeld Entertainment expanded an existing agreement with Fun Little Movies in order to stream FLM's short comedy videos on their network of Web sites, including ZVUE.com, Putfile.com, YourDailyMedia.com, UnOriginal.co.uk, FunMansion.com and Dorks.com.

In 2008, ROK Entertainment, a United Kingdom-based mobile TV provider, bought a majority (51 percent) stake of Fun Little Movies for a total of $1.375 million. Also in 2008 FLM debuted the Toyota series The Pool, a humorous series about a group of carpoolers, who happen to drive a Toyota Camry.

== Recognition ==
Fun Little Movies has won more than 20 awards, including a finalist's place for Best Live Action Short Film at the Cannes Film Festival. These include the 2006 and 2007 Mobile Entertainment Magazine Awards for Best Video, top prize at the 2003 CTIA's "World Smallest Film Festival", and two Golden Eagles at the American Cine Awards.

At the MoFilm competition at the February 2009 GSMA Mobile World Congress held in Barcelona, Spain, out of 250 entries from more than 100 countries, Fun Little Movies's production Turbo Dates: English as a Second Language won both Best Comedy and the Grand Prix.
