= FLM Panelcraft =

Mercedes-Benz estate by FLM nominally by Crayford Engineering

FLM (Panelcraft) Limited was a small coachbuilding firm in Battersea, London which, in addition to other work, specialized in converting saloon cars to estate cars or convertibles. FLM also did major restoration of valuable old cars and design and build work under contract for more famous coachbuilders whose name appeared on the finished product.

== Founders ==
Founded in the early 1950s by former staff of James Young, Corsica and Alpe & Saunders, the initials stood for H.S. (Nobby) Fry, Robert (Dick) Lee (founders) and W. McNally. They were joined by J.R. (Jack) Stammers from Corsica, nephew of Robert Lee.

== Production ==
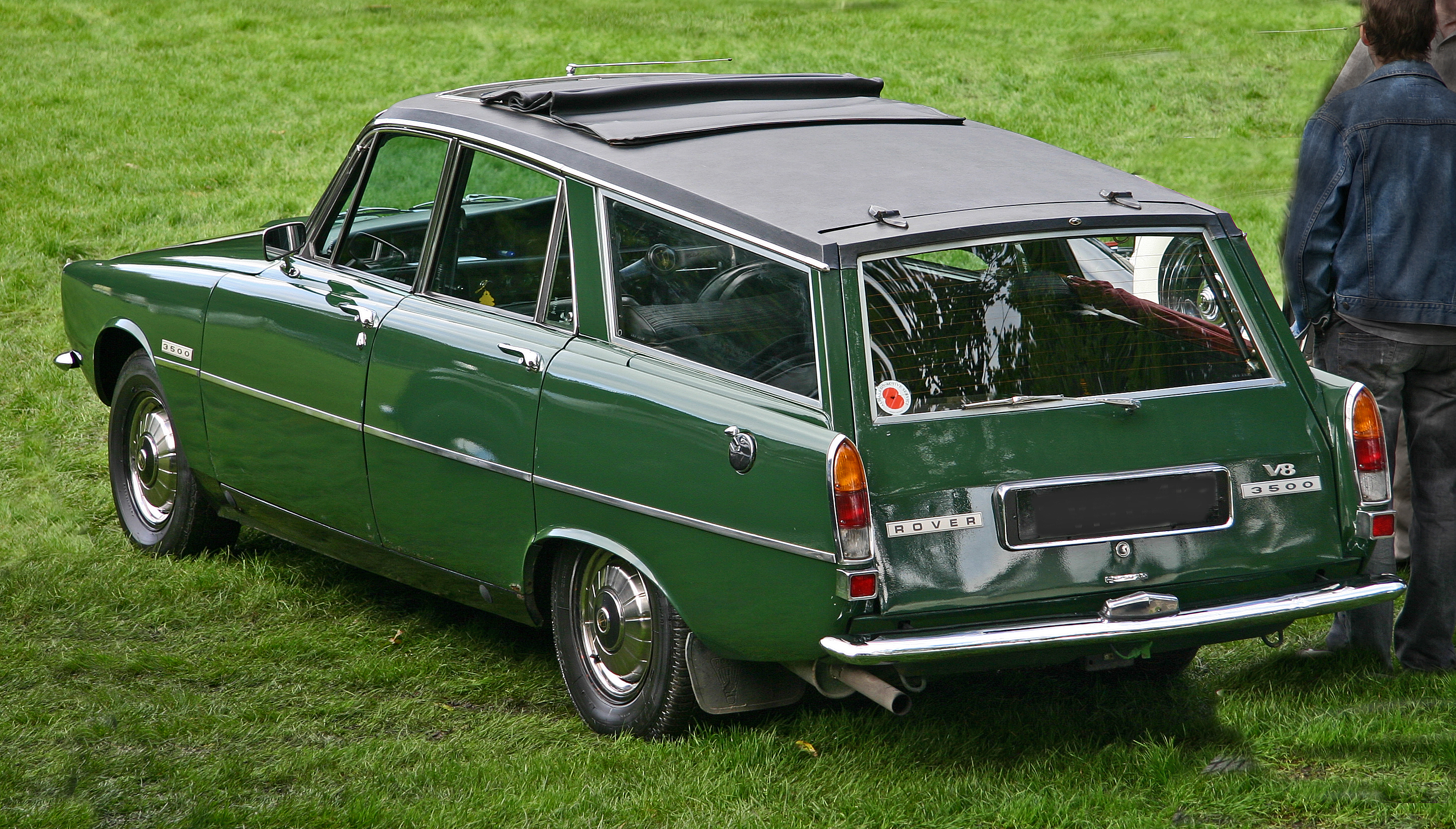
P6 estate by FLM Panelcraft

FLM provided bodies for Healey and HWM cars. Their most famous products were their series of bespoke "taxis" on Austin taxicab chassis for Nubar Gulbenkian and their Aston Martin estate cars.

Much of their later work was on Rovers. They lengthened the first 2-door Range Rovers 10 inches (25 cm) and converted them to 4-door cars, a body style not available from the factory until 1981. They also built other special variations to Range Rovers, including six-wheeled eight-seaters, open top versions, and they built estate car versions of the Rover 3500.

== Sources ==
- Mike McCarthy, The Boys from Kings Cross, Classic and Sportscar magazine, p.p. 110-115, June 1991. Interview about Corsica with Jack and Charles Stammers.
