= Princess (singer) =

- Also known as: Princess; HRS Princess
- Born: Desiree Carole Heslop; 28 November 1961 (age 64); London, England
- Genres: R&B; soul; disco; synth-pop
- Occupations: Singer; songwriter
- Instrument: Vocals
- Years active: 1983–present
- Labels: Supreme; Sony BMG Music Entertainment; Universal Music Group; Warner Music Group

Desiree Carole Heslop (born 28 November 1961), best known as Princess, is a British singer who found chart success in the mid-1980s. In the early 1980s, she worked with the Afro rock group Osibisa. She is best known for her hit single "Say I'm Your Number One" which made the UK top 10 in 1985. Three of Princess' other songs also made the UK top 40 - "After the Love Has Gone", "I'll Keep On Loving You" and "Tell Me Tomorrow". The latter was re-mixed for the soundtrack of the film Knights & Emeralds in 1986.

== Career ==
Princess was born as Desiree Carole Heslop on 28 November 1961. Her father, James Lloyd Heslop, had previously had a hit song in the 1970s, "Keep On Smiling". Desiree also has an older brother, Donovan, who acts as her manager.

Princess initially started out in law as a secretary and sales assistant. During her first year of college she sang vocals on a punk rock track called "If Pigs Could Fly". Before going solo, she was a backing vocalist for the band Osibisa in the early 1980s. Princess also sang backing vocals for artists such as Precious Wilson and Evelyn "Champagne" King.

During a fashion show organized by her brother Donovan in 1983, an employee at Stock Aitken Waterman (SAW) found out that Princess could sing, and invited her to a late-night backing vocal session to record ad libs. Although SAW made note of Desiree, they lost contact until a year later when they managed to get back into contact with her and employed her as a session singer. One of the acts she contributed to was Brilliant, on their album Kiss the Lips of Life.

In 1985, Princess, known as Desiree at the time, collaborated with 501's, and released the cover single "Let the Night Take the Blame", which was released under Fanfare Records. The single charted at #163.

Her debut solo album Princess (1986) was composed and produced by SAW which contained the hit single, "Say I'm Your Number One", which reached number seven in the UK, as well as the top 10 in Australia, Netherlands, New Zealand, Switzerland and West Germany. The album spawned five total charting singles, with four of them reaching the UK top 40, and two in the top 20 and was certified Silver in the UK.

In 1987, Polydor offered a recording contract with Princess which SAW could not compete with and Princess signed with them. She recorded her second album, All for Love (1987) in the United States, but neither the album nor its four singles had much success. That same year, she was a part of the ensemble choir for the charity single "Let It Be" by Ferry Aid.

Under Touch Tone Records, Princess released a standalone single, "Lover Don't Go" in 1989, which was unsuccessful due to a barcode error. The music video was self-funded and the underperformance of the single bankrupted Princess and Donovan.

Her third album, Say It, which was slated for release in 1990, was never issued due to budget concerns. She did provide backing vocals on Vanilla Ice album To the Extreme in 1990, however by the next year she had moved to the United States and retired from music.

In 1998; Princess issued an independent single release of a cover of The Sweeter He Is by The Soul Children. It did not chart, but caught the attention of songwriter Isaac Hayes.

In 2003, after moving back to England, Princess formed her own music label with her brother Donovan, OnDa Ground Music Label, which has released all her music since, and released her first single in 14 years, "Ride", with rap ensemble E.E.D.B., or Eagle E and Doc B. A music video was filmed in 2004 which referenced her retirement.

She appeared in ITV's 2005 production Hit Me, Baby, One More Time, singing Kylie Minogue's "Slow". During the recording of the production; she announced a studio album, "Temple of Love" which was never released.

In 2008, Princess released single "Sweet Money" which failed to chart. A similar issue happened with her 2010 single "One Away".

In April 2014, following four years of work, she released her third album, The Emergence, her first in 27 years. It was the first in a trilogy of albums, the other ones titled The Passion and The One. To support the album, Princess released one single and music video "I'm Gonna Love Ya".

In March 2019, she released the EP "The Passion Part 1". It had one single, "So Far From My Baby", which previously had a promotional release in 2015. The remixed version featured a music video, which is Princess' latest to date.

In May 2021, Princess released a teaser for her single "Silhouettes in the Dark", which can be found on her YouTube channel. In July that year, an interview with Princess and her brother Donovan was featured on "A Journey Through Soul" podcast, which would later return in November.

On 14 February 2023 she released the single "Will You Call Me" from her upcoming album "The Passion".

On 28 August 2025, Princess released a new single "London Town" on her bandcamp website. The single was originally recorded in 2012. In November of that year, Princess appeared on Music For Global Change with Skyler Jett where she teased three new songs from "The Passion". On July 3, 2026, Princess released "The Passion" as a full length 14 track album, with two bonus tracks "Will You Call Me" and "Lonesome".

== Discography ==
=== Studio albums ===
Year	Title	Chart positions		Certifications	Record label
Year	Title	UK	AUS	Certifications	Record label
1986	Princess	15	81	BPI: Silver	Supreme Records
1987	All for Love	—	—		Polydor Records
2014	The Emergence	—	—		OnDa Ground Music Label
2026	The Passion	—	—		OnDa Ground Music Label
"—" denotes releases that did not chart.

=== Extended plays ===
Year	Title	Chart positions		Certifications	Record label
Year	Title	UK	AUS	Certifications	Record label
2019	The Passion Part I	—	—		OnDa Ground Music Label
2026	The Passion Part II	—	—		OnDa Ground Music Label
"—" denotes releases that did not chart.

=== Singles ===
List of singles, with selected chart positions
Title	Year	Peak chart positions												
Title	Year	UK	AUS	US Dance	US R&B	IRE	SWI	NOR	GER	NLD	SWE	ATR	BEL	NZ
"Let the Night Take the Blame"	1985	163	—	—	—	—	—	—	—	—	—	—	—	—
"Say I'm Your Number One"	1985	7	8	15	19	11	4	—	2	6	—	29	12	2
"After the Love Has Gone"	1985	28	57	6	41	27	15	5	27	25	8	—	21	6
"I'll Keep on Loving You"	1986	16	—	—	—	27	19	—	25	41	—	—	28	11
"Tell Me Tomorrow"	1986	34	—	—	—	—	—	—	65	—	—	—	29	—
"In the Heat of a Passionate Moment"	1986	74	—	30	—	—	—	—	—	—	—	—	—	—
"Red Hot"	1987	58	—	30	78	—	—	—	—	—	—	—	34	—
"I Wish You Love"	1987	—	—	—	—	—	—	—	—	—	—	—	—	—
"I Cannot Carry On"	1987	92	—	—	—	—	—	—	—	—	—	—	—	—
"Jammin' with Your Love"	1988	—	—	—	—	—	—	—	—	—	—	—	—	—
"Lover Don't Go"	1989	104	—	—	—	—	—	—	—	—	—	—	—	—
"Dressed to Kill"	1989	—	—	—	—	—	—	—	—	—	—	—	—	—
"The Sweeter He Is^{[a]}"	1998	—	—	—	—	—	—	—	—	—	—	—	—	—
"Ride"	2003	—	—	—	—	—	—	—	—	—	—	—	—	—
"Sweet Money^{[a]}"	2008	—	—	—	—	—	—	—	—	—	—	—	—	—
"One Away^{[a]}"	2010	—	—	—	—	—	—	—	—	—	—	—	—	—
"I'm Gonna Love Ya"	2013	—	—	—	—	—	—	—	—	—	—	—	—	—
"So Far From My Baby"	2015	—	—	—	—	—	—	—	—	—	—	—	—	—
"So Far From My Baby" (remix)	2019	—	—	—	—	—	—	—	—	—	—	—	—	—
"Silhouettes In The Dark"	2021	—	—	—	—	—	—	—	—	—	—	—	—	—
"Will You Call Me"	2023	—	—	—	—	—	—	—	—	—	—	—	—	—
"London Town"	2025	—	—	—	—	—	—	—	—	—	—	—	—	—
"—" denotes a recording that did not chart or was not released in that territory.														
