= Respectable (Mel and Kim song) =

Single by Mel and Kim

from the album F.L.M.
- Released: 18 February 1987
- Genre: Dance-pop
- Length: 5:43 (album version); 3:21 (7-inch/single version)
- Label: Supreme
- Songwriters: Mike Stock; Matt Aitken; Pete Waterman
- Producer: Stock Aitken Waterman

Mel and Kim singles chronology
| "Showing Out (Get Fresh at the Weekend)" (1986) | "Respectable" (1987) | "F.L.M." (1987) |

Music video
- "Respectable" on YouTube

"Respectable" is a song by English pop duo Mel and Kim from their only studio album, F.L.M. (1987). It was released on 18 February 1987 as the album's second single. The song reached number one on the UK Singles Chart for one week in March 1987, becoming the second UK number-one single produced by Stock Aitken Waterman (SAW), following Dead or Alive's "You Spin Me Round (Like a Record)" (1985), and the first UK number one that the trio had written themselves. The single also topped the charts in many European countries, as well as in Oceania.

== Background ==
The track was conceived as a more commercial follow up to the act's debut hit, "Showing Out (Get Fresh at the Weekend)". Supreme Records head Nick East requested that SAW produce a song in line with the flavour of their debut hit, but more accessible. The lyrics of the song were inspired by the sisters' dismissive and shame-free response to a tabloid scandal over the emergence of old nude glamour photos of Mel. East expressed strong reservations over the track's trademark stuttering hook, fearing it was too gimmicky, overly commercial and an unnecessary departure from the sound of their debut. Pete Waterman and Mike Stock strongly objected to the hook's potential removal. East changed his mind after an early performance of the track on a TV show in the Netherlands received a rapturous response. The sampled laughter heard through the song was captured during studio conversation between the act and producers, with the sisters initially unaware the interaction would end up on the record.

== Critical reception ==
=== Initial response ===
In his dance column published in Record Mirror, James Hamilton presented "Respectable" "a beefily bounding 0-121 3/4bpm house-type churner", adding it adds "a deadly commercial Eurobeat-ish singalong vocal melody, and more sparsely Chicago-style (0-)119 1/4bpm Extra Beat Version jack track flip". Pete Clark of Smash Hits stated that the song would be a treat for only "very, very sad people" and considered "the gimmickly noises and Pinky and Perky vocals effects... are as irritating as a talkative Weetabix".

=== Impact and legacy ===
Retrospectively, in 2021, British magazine Classic Pop ranked the song number six in their list of "Top 40 Stock Aitken Waterman songs", adding that the song "reflected Mel & Kim's down-to-earth, playful charisma, at the same time mirroring the PWL ad slogan ("You can love or hate us, you ain't ever gonna change us... we ain't ever going to be respectable"). An incredible response to Stock's infamous tay-tay-tay line when performed live meant "Respectable" became one." In 2023, Alexis Petridis of The Guardian listed the song at number 6 in his "Stock Aitken Waterman's 20 greatest songs – ranked!", adding that it "is all about the hook, but what a hook it is: the sampled vocals, the lurching, seasick chords beneath". In 2025, Thomas Edward of Smooth Radio ranked what he called "chart-topping anthem about independence and rebellion" fifth in his list of "Stock Aitken Waterman's 15 greatest songs, ranked".

== Chart performance ==
"Respectable" was a major hit worldwide and became Mel and Kim's most successful single. In the UK, it entered the singles chart at number 25 on 7 March 1987, then climbed to number seven, and topped the chart in its fourth week. It charted in the top 100 for a total of 16 weeks, seven of them spent in the top ten, and received a Gold disc awarded by the British Phonographic Industry. In Germany, it debuted at number 54 on 16 March 1987, jumped to number 12, reached number one for two weeks and appeared on the chart for 17 weeks, which was the duo's second most successful single in the country, after "Showing Out (Get Fresh at the Week-End)". It was also a number one hit for three weeks in the Netherlands out of a 16-week chart run, for four weeks in both Switzerland and the Flanders region of Belgium, two countries in which it stayed on the chart for 12 weeks, and in Finland. In addition, it attained the second position in Ireland, Italy, Norway and South Africa, the fifth position in Sweden and the seventh position in Austria. The only country where it missed the top ten is France where it stalled at number 14 and charted in the top 50 for 16 weeks.

On the Music & Media's Pan-Eurochart Hot 100 chart, "Respectable" started at number 23 on 14 March 1987, reached the top ten the next week and topped the chart for consecutive two weeks. It appeared on this chart first for 17 weeks, then re-entered for additional 13 weeks after a 12-week hiatus due to its late release in France. It also featured for 11 weeks on the European Airplay Top 50, with a peak at number five twice. Outside Europe, "Respectable" reached number one for five weeks in New Zealand where it charted for 16 weeks, a position it also reached in Australia and on the US Dance chart. As a result of these good weekly chart performances, "Respectable" ranked in the top ten on the 1987 year-end chart in the Netherlands, Australia, New Zealand and the UK, and in the top 20 in Belgium, Switzerland, South Africa and West Germany.

== Cover versions and sampling ==
Girl band Girls@Play released a cover version of "Respectable" in 2001, which peaked at number 29 in the United Kingdom. Australian actor and singer Tim Campbell covered the song on his 2018 album Electrifying 80s. The song was sampled in Pop Will Eat Itself's song "Hit the Hi-Tech Groove" from the 1987 album Box Frenzy. The Pop Will Eat Itself song, which skewers Stock/Aiken/Waterman-style manufactured pop, has in its chorus the line "you don't need respectability." The song also features in BBC comedy series Gary: Tank Commander, as the mobile phone ringtone of the titular character.

== Track listings ==
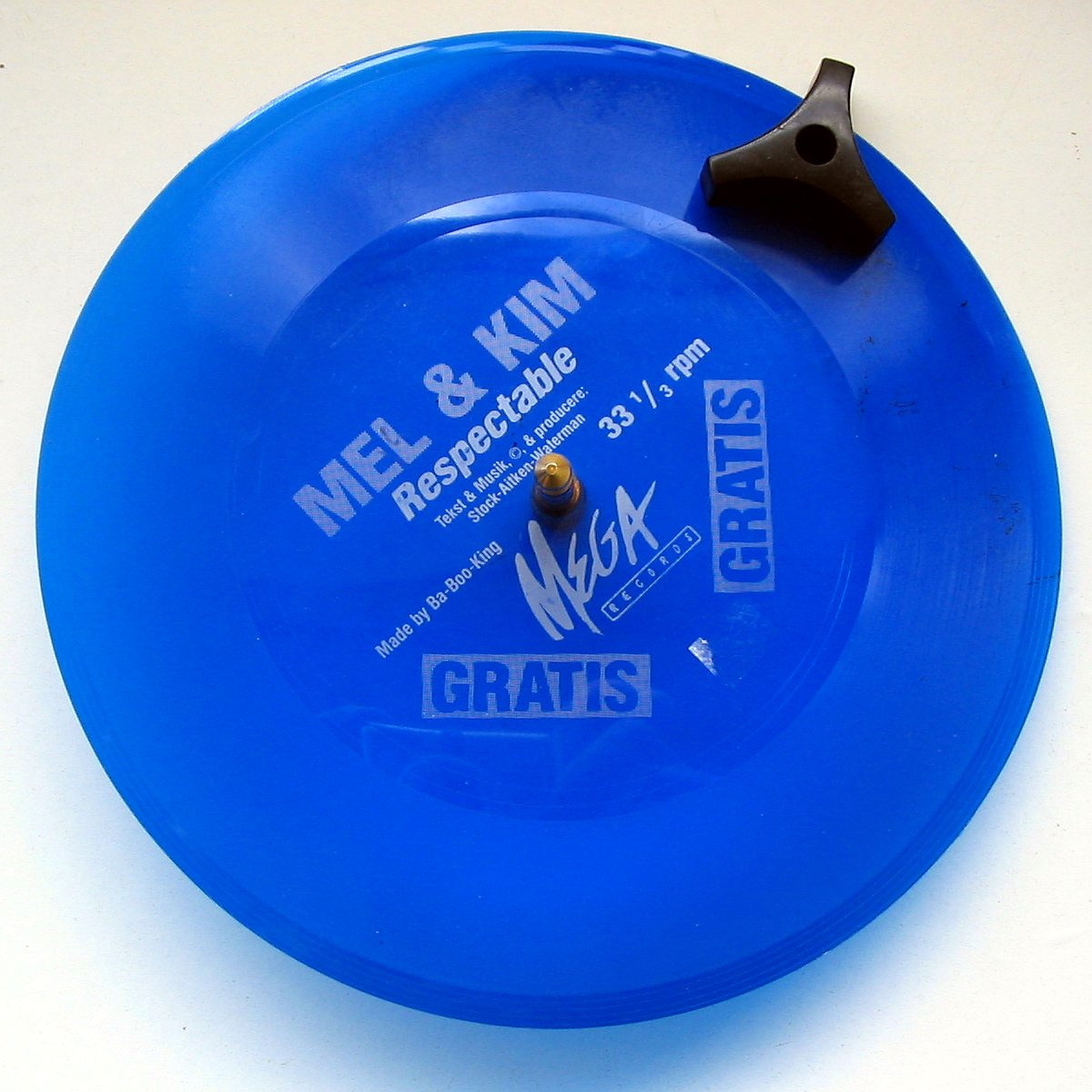
A Danish promotional 7-inch flexi-disc of "Respectable", released by Mega Records

- 7-inch single

A. "Respectable" – 3:22
B. "Respectable" (instrumental) – 4:04

- Japanese 7-inch single

A. "Respectable" – 3:22
B. "Respectable" (dub version) – 4:09

- 12-inch single

A. "Respectable" (club mix) – 6:15
AA1. "Respectable" (7″ version) – 3:22
AA2. "Respectable" (Extra Beats version) – 8:08

- UK 12-inch single (remix)
- UK limited-edition 12-inch picture disc
- German 12-inch maxi single (special remix)

A. "Respectable" (The Tabloid mix) – 7:50
AA1. "Respectable" (7″ version) – 3:22
AA2. "Respectable" (Extra Beats version) – 8:08

- UK 12-inch single (remix)

A. "Respectable" (Shop mix)
AA1. "Respectable" (7″ version) – 3:22
AA2. "Respectable" (Extra Beats version) – 8:08

- US and Canadian 12-inch single

A. "Respectable" (vocal/club mix) – 6:15
B. "Respectable" (The Tabloid mix) – 7:50

== Charts ==
=== Weekly charts ===
Weekly chart performance for "Respectable"
| Chart (1987) | Peak position |
|---|---|
| Australia (Australian Music Report) | 1 |
| Austria (Ö3 Austria Top 40) | 7 |
| Belgium (Ultratop 50 Flanders) | 1 |
| Belgium (Ultratop 40 Wallonia) | 1 |
| Europe (European Hot 100 Singles) | 1 |
| Europe (European Airplay Top 50) | 5 |
| Finland (Suomen virallinen lista) | 1 |
| France (SNEP) | 14 |
| Ireland (IRMA) | 2 |
| Italy (Musica e dischi) | 2 |
| Italy Airplay (Music & Media) | 7 |
| Luxembourg (Radio Luxembourg) | 1 |
| Netherlands (Dutch Top 40) | 1 |
| Netherlands (Single Top 100) | 1 |
| New Zealand (Recorded Music NZ) | 1 |
| Norway (VG-lista) | 2 |
| Quebec (ADISQ) | 40 |
| South Africa (Springbok Radio) | 2 |
| Sweden (Sverigetopplistan) | 5 |
| Switzerland (Schweizer Hitparade) | 1 |
| UK Singles (Official Charts) | 1 |
| UK Dance (Music Week) | 2 |
| US Dance Club Songs (Billboard) Remix | 1 |
| US Dance Singles Sales (Billboard) Remix | 1 |
| West Germany (GfK) | 1 |

=== Year-end charts ===
Year-end chart performance for "Respectable"
| Chart (1987) | Position |
|---|---|
| Australia (Australian Music Report) | 5 |
| Belgium (Ultratop) | 16 |
| Europe (European Hot 100 Singles) | 11 |
| Netherlands (Dutch Top 40) | 13 |
| Netherlands (Single Top 100) | 3 |
| New Zealand (RIANZ) | 5 |
| South Africa (Springbok Radio) | 19 |
| Switzerland (Schweizer Hitparade) | 15 |
| UK Singles (Gallup) | 6 |
| US 12-inch Singles Sales (Billboard) | 29 |
| US Dance Club Play (Billboard) | 25 |
| West Germany (Media Control) | 15 |

1985–1989 chart performance for "Respectable"
| Chart (1985–1989) | Position |
|---|---|
| Europe (European Hot 100 Singles) | 55 |

== Certifications ==
Certifications for "Respectable"
| Region | Certification | Certified units/sales |
|---|---|---|
| Netherlands (NVPI) | Gold | 75,000^{^} |
| United Kingdom (BPI) | Gold | 500,000^{^} |
^{^} Shipments figures based on certification alone.
