= Kim Appleby =

Singer

- Born: Kim Loraine Appleby; 28 August 1961 (age 64)
- Origin: Hackney, London, England
- Genres: Dance-pop, pop
- Occupations: Singer, songwriter
- Years active: 1986–present
- Label: Parlophone
- Formerly of: Mel and Kim

Kim Loraine Appleby (born 28 August 1961) is a pop singer and songwriter. She participated in the duo Mel and Kim with her sister Melanie Appleby.

== Career ==
=== Solo music career ===
Appleby released her first solo album Kim Appleby, in November 1990. The album included songs co-written with Mel for what was intended to be the next "Mel and Kim" album, alongside other songs that Kim had composed following Mel's death. One of these songs, "Don't Worry", was selected as the first single, and reached number two in the British charts in November 1990, as well as being a hit in Europe. As a result, "Don't Worry" was nominated for an Ivor Novello Award for Best Contemporary Song in 1991.

A follow-up single "G.L.A.D." was a UK No. 10 hit. Subsequent singles from her debut album were "Mama" (No. 19) and "If You Cared" (No. 44).

Appleby's second album, Breakaway, only received a limited release. However, she released three further singles, "Light of the World" (No. 41, 1993), "Breakaway" (No. 56, 1993) and "Free Spirit" (No. 51, 1994), which saw her reunite with Stock and Aitken.

=== British Academy of Songwriter, Composers and Authors ===
In 1994, Appleby took a break from being a recording artist to concentrate purely on songwriting for other acts. As a result, she spent some time in Sweden working with songwriter Anders Bagge, co-founder of the Murlyn Music Group. She has also collaborated with Michael Garvin ("Never Give Up on A Good Thing") as well as Sheppard Solomon (Britney Spears, Kelly Clarkson, Natalie Imbruglia).

She also worked with the British Academy of Songwriters, Composers and Authors (BASCA) where she chaired the Ivor Novello Awards judges panel for Best Contemporary Song for over ten years, and previously the Best Song Musically and Lyrically for two years.

=== Return to releasing music and performing ===
After ten years, in 2004, Appleby collaborated with Whiteman on a track "Believe" which was released in Germany. Following this she released "High" as a download-only club single in 2007.

In December 2010, the single "Took a Minute" by Levthand featuring Appleby was released in Europe. Appleby collaborated with Levthand twice more; in 2011 on the song "The World Today Is A Mess", and in 2022 for the song "I Need Love".

In September 2016 a promo CD was issued for a new song called "What's Not to Love', which was co-written with Dominic King.

In 2017 Appleby collaborated with Vicarious Bliss on the song "Whatever Makes You Happy".

In January 2018, a previously unreleased track from Appleby's Mel & Kim days, "Where Is Love", was released through Dancing Nation Records.

In 2018, Appleby returned to performing live after 20 years. Later that year, Kim co-presented the three-part series on BBC Four "Smashing Hits! The 80s Pop Map of Britain and Ireland" with Midge Ure.

== Awards and nominations ==
Award	Year	Nominee(s)	Category	Result	Ref.
Brit Awards	1988	Mel and Kim	British Breakthrough Act	Eliminated	
Ivor Novello Awards	1988	"Respectable"	Most Performed Work	Nominated	
Ivor Novello Awards	1991	"Don't Worry"	Best Contemporary Song	Nominated	

== Discography ==
=== Albums ===
- Kim Appleby (1990) – UK No. 23, AUS No. 159, AUT No. 30, GER No. 45, NED No. 65, SWE No. 24, SWI No. 36. Certified gold in the UK.
- Breakaway (1993)

=== Singles ===
Year	Single	Peak positions										Album
Year	Single	UK	AUS	AUT	BEL (FL)	FRA	GER	IRE	NED	SWE	SWI	Album
1990	"Don't Worry"	2	119	9	2	35	8	5	3	12	6	Kim Appleby
1991	"G.L.A.D"	10	158	22	6	—	19	7	16	—	14	Kim Appleby
1991	"Mama"	19	—	—	25	—	41	—	—	—	—	Kim Appleby
1991	"If You Cared"	44	—	—	—	—	—	—	—	—	—	Kim Appleby
1993	"Light of the World"	41	137	—	—	—	58	—	—	—	—	Breakaway
1993	"Breakaway"	56	—	—	—	—	—	—	—	—	—	Breakaway
1994	"Free Spirit"	51	—	—	—	—	—	—	—	—	—	single only
2007	"High"	108	—	—	—	—	—	—	—	—	—	single only
2016	"What's Not to Love"	—	—	—	—	—	—	—	—	—	—	single only
"—" denotes releases that did not chart

- 2004: "Believe" (Whiteman feat. Kim Appleby) [German promo CD]
- 2010: "Took a Minute" (Levthand feat. Kim Appleby)
- 2011: "The World Today Is a Mess" (Levthand feat. Kim Appleby)
- 2017: "Whatever Makes You Happy" (Vicarious Bliss feat. Kim Appleby)
- 2022: "I Need Love" (Levthand feat. Kim Appleby)
