= Craig Logan =

Scottish music manager

- Born: 22 April 1969 (age 57)
- Occupations: Musician, songwriter, artist manager
- Years active: 1987–present

Craig 'Ken' Logan (born 22 April 1969) is a Scottish musician, songwriter, and manager. He began his career as bassist in the pop band Bros.

== Career ==
Craig Logan started in the music industry as the bass player for the British pop band Bros. The band's debut "Push" album sold over 12 million copies.

In early 1989, Logan left Bros after developing ME/CFS to focus on songwriting and producing. Kim Appleby's song "Don't Worry", which he co-wrote with Appleby (whom he also managed) and George Deangelis, was nominated for an Ivor Novello Award in the 'Best Contemporary Song' category in 1991.

In 1999, Logan left EMI to work with artist manager Roger Davies. He went on to oversee worldwide tours and releases for acts including Tina Turner, Sade, Joe Cocker and M People before meeting Pink, whom he signed and co-managed with Davies for several years.

In 2006, Logan joined Sony BMG UK (now Sony Music) as the Managing Director of the RCA Label Group.

He left Sony Music in 2010 to start his new venture, Logan Media Entertainment (LME), which was established in 2011. LME now have offices in both London and Los Angeles and the company has managed artists such as: Anastacia, Dido, Alfie Boe, Imelda May, Beverley Knight, Roachford and Lara Fabian. As well as having a record label (HiTea) and a publishing imprint.

In 2022, Logan set up Tag8 Music in association with BMG Rights Management. This was the first new UK-based record label set up within the BMG group since 2009, with Tag8 Music featuring established acts such as Pixie Lott, Roachford, and Louise Redknapp on its roster. On the Official Albums Chart Top 100 of 4 November 2022, the label charted its first hit album in the form of Blue's Heart & Soul, which entered at number 22.
