= Melanie Appleby =

English singer (1966–1990)

Background information
- Born: Melanie Susan Appleby; 11 July 1966; Hackney, London, England
- Died: 18 January 1990 (aged 23) Westminster, London, England
- Occupations: Singer
- Instrument: Vocals
- Years active: 1985–1988
- Formerly of: Mel and Kim

Melanie Susan "Mel" Appleby (11 July 1966 – 18 January 1990) was an English singer and half of the 1980s duo Mel and Kim. They had a number one hit on the UK Singles Chart in March 1987, with the song "Respectable".

== Career ==
Appleby was born in Hackney, London, to a Jamaican father and a British mother. She initially worked as a glamour model, before joining her sister Kim Appleby to form Mel and Kim. The duo enjoyed considerable chart success in the late 1980s, achieving four UK top ten hits, including the number one "Respectable" (1987), while their debut album, F.L.M. (1987) spent 25 weeks on the UK chart and was certified platinum in the UK.

== Death ==
In 1985, prior to the duo's recording career, Mel was treated for malignant paraganglioma, a form of cancer, on her liver. By January 1987, Mel was experiencing back problems, delaying the filming of the "Respectable" music video. During a promotional visit to Japan in June 1987, Mel's back pain worsened, rendering her unable to perform, and she returned to the UK in a wheelchair. A recurrence of the cancer was detected in Mel's spine after undergoing tests at St Bartholomew's Hospital. The sisters withdrew from the public life while Mel underwent treatment, trying to keep the diagnosis secret from the public and many colleagues. The terminal cancer diagnosis was revealed to the public when a journalist called at her house, pretending to be a nurse.

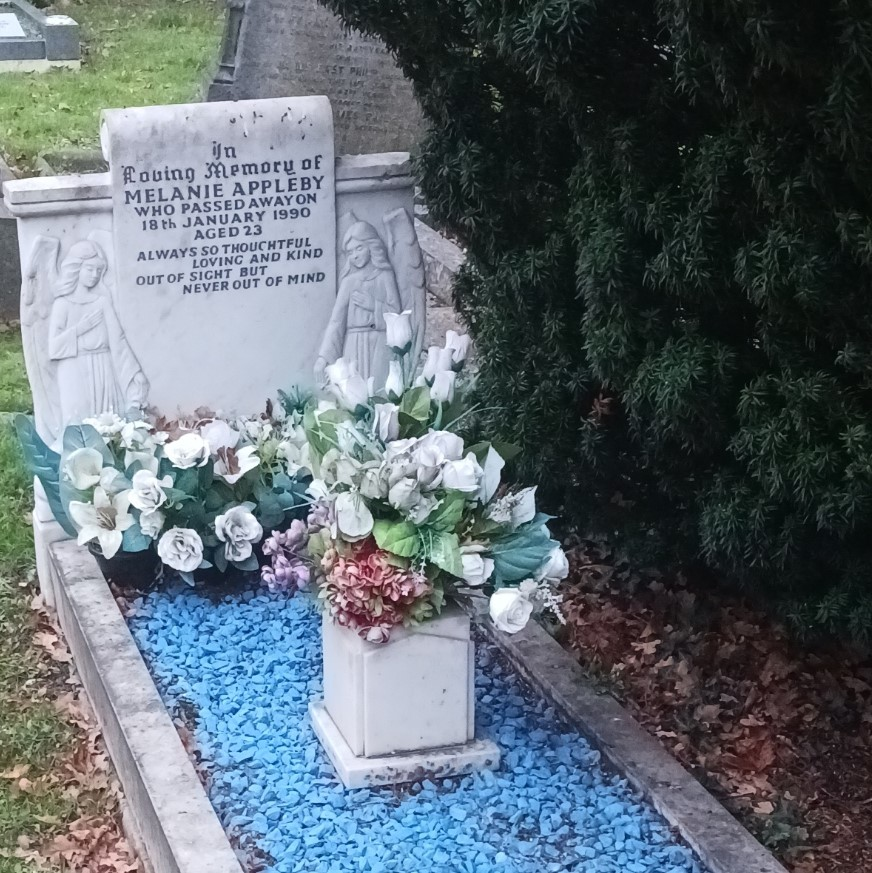
Grave of Melanie Appleby

Appleby was treated for her cancer, but died on 18 January 1990, aged 23, in Westminster, London from pneumonia. She was buried in East Finchley Cemetery.
