= Supreme Records (UK) =

Record label of Peter Waterman Entertainment

Supreme Records UK was a record label affiliated to Peter Waterman Entertainment. The label released music from artists such as Lonnie Gordon, Mel and Kim and Princess. Most releases were then transferred to EMI.

== Notable releases ==
- 1985: "Say I'm Your Number One" (#7 UK, #8 AUS, #2 New Zealand, #4 Switzerland, #6 The Netherlands, #2 Germany, #11 Ireland, #29 Austria, #22 US Dance, #19 US R&B)
- 1986: "Showing Out (Get Fresh at the Weekend)" (#3 UK, #12 AUS, #8 New Zealand, #1 Germany, #1 US Dance)
- 1987: "Respectable" (#1 UK, #2 Ireland, #1 AUS, #1 New Zealand, #1 Germany, #1 US Dance)
