= Pete Waterman Presents the Hit Factory =

Compilation album by Various Artists
- Released: 9 July 2012
- Recorded: 1984–1999
- Genre: Pop
- Label: Sony
- Producer: Stock Aitken Waterman

Various Artists chronology
Stock Aitken Waterman Gold (2005)	Pete Waterman Presents the Hit Factory (2012)

Pete Waterman Presents The Hit Factory is a compilation album released in July 2012 collecting 39 hits produced by Pete Waterman. Included are a vast number of tracks that were written and produced by Waterman along with Mike Stock and Matt Aitken during their most successful period working as Stock Aitken Waterman, becoming among the most successful music producers of all-time.

The release of the album coincided with Pete Waterman Presents The Hit Factory Live, a concert that was due to take place in London’s Hyde Park on 11 July 2012 and featuring the classic artists from the 'Hit Factory' era together on one bill. Both Kylie Minogue and Jason Donovan were due to perform their million selling duet 'Especially for You' alongside Rick Astley, Sinitta, Bananarama and Hazell Dean but the concert was ultimately cancelled due to poor weather conditions. It was eventually rescheduled for 21 December 2012 at The O2 Arena in Greenwich.

An early track listing included two hits by Donna Summer produced by Stock Aitken Waterman in 1989: 'I Don't Wanna Get Hurt' and 'This Time I Know It's For Real'. Early artwork for the CD showed the 7-inch single covers of the tracks featured on the compilation, and the Donna Summer tracks were originally shown. Some music retail websites still show this earlier artwork when promoting the CD. However, the final track listing and artwork replaced these songs with tracks by Loveland and Opus III, neither of which were produced by Waterman, nor were Stock Aitken Waterman productions.

The bonus disc contained rarities including the obscure Morgan-McVey track 'Looking Good Diving (With The Wild Bunch)' from 1987 which is considered an early version of Neneh Cherry's breakthrough hit 'Buffalo Stance' in 1988. The rare mix of Kylie Minogue's 'What Do I Have To Do' was also well received, however, reaction to the compilation was largely negative with critics and would-be buyers criticizing the track-listing as too similar to the 2005 release Stock Aitken Waterman Gold.

== Track listing ==
CD one

1. Mel and Kim - Respectable (7" Version) Originally from F.L.M.
2. Rick Astley - Never Gonna Give You Up Originally from Whenever You Need Somebody
3. Kylie Minogue - I Should Be So Lucky Originally from Kylie
4. Dead or Alive - You Spin Me Round (Like a Record) Originally from Youthquake
5. Bananarama - Love in the First Degree Originally from Wow!
6. Jason Donovan - Too Many Broken Hearts Originally from Ten Good Reasons
7. Sonia - You'll Never Stop Me Loving You Originally from Everybody Knows
8. Lonnie Gordon - Happenin' All Over Again [Hip House Radio Mix] Originally from If I Have to Stand Alone
9. Loveland featuring Rachel McFarlane - Let the Music (Lift You Up) [Full On Vocal Radio Edit] Single release only
10. Sybil - When I'm Good And Ready Originally from Good 'N' Ready
11. Brother Beyond - The Harder I Try Originally from Get Even
12. Hazell Dean - Whatever I Do (Wherever I Go) [Radio Edit] Originally from Heart First
13. Divine - You Think You're A Man Originally from The Story So Far
14. Sinitta - Toy Boy Originally from Sinitta!
15. Big Fun - Blame It On the Boogie Originally from A Pocketful of Dreams
16. Pepsi & Shirlie - Heartache Originally from All Right Now
17. Princess - Say I'm Your Number One Originally from Princess
18. Kylie & Jason - Especially for You Originally from Ten Good Reasons
19. Steps - Heartbeat Originally from Step One

CD two

1. Kylie Minogue - Hand on Your Heart Originally from Enjoy Yourself
2. Bananarama - Venus Originally from True Confessions
3. Hazell Dean - Who's Leaving Who Originally from Always
4. Cliff Richard - I Just Don't Have the Heart [2000 Digital Remaster] Originally from Stronger
5. Rick Astley - Together Forever [Lover's Leap Remix] Originally from Hold Me in Your Arms
6. Sinitta - Cross My Broken Heart Originally from Sinitta!
7. Samantha Fox - Nothing's Gonna Stop Me Now Originally from Samantha Fox
8. Dead Or Alive - Lover Come Back (To Me) Originally from Youthquake
9. Opus III - It's a Fine Day [Edit] Originally from Mind Fruit
10. Stock Aitken Waterman - Roadblock Single release only
11. Princess - I'll Keep On Loving You Originally from Princess
12. Lonnie Gordon - Beyond Your Wildest Dreams Originally from If I Have to Stand Alone
13. Jason Donovan - Sealed With A Kiss Originally from Ten Good Reasons
14. West End Featuring Sybil - The Love I Lost Originally from Doin' It Now
15. Brother Beyond - He Ain't No Competition Originally from Get Even
16. Sonia - Listen To Your Heart Originally from Everybody Knows
17. The Reynolds Girls - I'd Rather Jack Single release only
18. Mel & Kim - Showing Out (Get Fresh At The Weekend) Originally from F.L.M.
19. Steps - Tragedy Originally from Steptacular
20. The WIP 2 Tribute Mix [Megamix]

Bonus disc

1. Princess - Say I'm Your Number One [Princess to a King Mix]
2. Mondo Kane - New York Afternoon [Extended Version]
3. The Three Degrees - The Heaven I Need [Extended Mix]
4. Morgan-McVey feat. Neneh Cherry - Looking Good Diving (With The Wild Bunch)
5. Mandy Smith - I Just Can't Wait [Alternative 12" Mix]
6. Precious Wilson - Only the Strong Survive [Extended Version]
7. Sybil - When I'm Good And Ready [Original 12" Mix]
8. Jason Donovan - Too Many Broken Hearts [Party Hearty Mix]
9. Kylie Minogue - What Do I Have To Do? [Billy the Fish Remix]
10. Dead Or Alive - You Spin Me Round (Like A Record) [Buzzing Bees Mix]

== See also ==
- List of songs produced by Stock Aitken Waterman (in chronological order, including US and UK chart positions)
- The Hit Factory: The Best of Stock Aitken Waterman. (1987 UK compilation album released by Stylus Records).
- The Hit Factory Volume 2. (1988 UK/Japan compilation album released by Fanfare Records and PWL Records.)
- The Hit Factory Volume 3. (1989 compilation album released by Fanfare Records and PWL Records.)
- A Ton Of Hits: The Very Best of Stock Aitken Waterman. (1990 compilation released by Chrysalis Records, trading as Dover Records.)
- Stock Aitken Waterman Gold. (2005 compilation released by PWL Records in association with Sony BMG).
