= The Hit Factory (disambiguation) =

The Hit Factory was a recording studio in New York City famous for its clientele.

The Hit Factory or Hit Factory may also refer to several compilation albums:

- Associated with the Stock Aitken Waterman production team, or Pete Waterman:
  - The Hit Factory: The Best of Stock Aitken Waterman, a 1987 compilation of SAW productions
  - The Hit Factory Volume 2, a 1988 compilation of SAW productions
  - The Hit Factory Volume 3, a 1989 compilation of SAW productions
  - The Hit Factory: Pete Waterman's Greatest Hits, a 2000 compilation of songs associated with Pete Waterman
- Hit Factory (album), a 1985 compilation of hits by The Monkees
