= A Ton of Hits: The Very Best of Stock Aitken Waterman =

A Ton Of Hits: The Very Best of Stock Aitken Waterman

Compilation album by Various Artists
- Released: November 1990
- Recorded: 1984–1990
- Genre: Pop music
- Length: Disc 1, 59 mins 6 secs; Disc 2, 60 mins 6 secs
- Label: Chrysalis Records
- Producer: Tony King

A Ton of Hits : The Very Best of Stock Aitken Waterman is a compilation album released in the UK in November 1990 bringing together the hits of Stock Aitken Waterman (SAW) in a continuously sequenced mix. It was released by Chrysalis Records on their subsidiary label Dover Records and followed the previous "Best of Stock Aitken Waterman" collections; The Hit Factory: The Best of Stock Aitken Waterman (Stylus Records, 1987), The Hit Factory Volume 2 (Fanfare/PWL Records, 1988) and The Hit Factory Volume 3 (Fanfare/PWL Records,1989). The album reached #7 in the compilation Top 20. Notably absent from this release are Bananarama and Dead or Alive, presumably due to licensing issues, whilst including nine songs by Jason Donovan, and ten by Kylie Minogue.

== Track listing ==
(DOVER/PWL CCD 19) 81 CONTINUOUSLY SEQUENCED TRACKS

=== CD One Track 1/ LP Disc One Side A ===
1. Sealed with a Kiss -- Jason Donovan
2. Beyond Your Wildest Dreams -- Lonnie Gordon
3. Packjammed With The Party Posse -- Stock Aitken Waterman
4. Roadblock—Stock Aitken Waterman
5. After The Love Has Gone -- Princess
6. Say I'm Your Number One—Princess
7. New York Afternoon—Mondo Kane
8. Let's Get Together Tonite (You Wot!) -- Steve Walsh
9. No Fool (For Love) -- Hazell Dean
10. Wouldn't Change A Thing -- Kylie Minogue
11. Never Gonna Give You Up -- Rick Astley
12. Whenever You Need Somebody—Rick Astley
13. Can't Forget You -- Sonia
14. Together Forever—Rick Astley
15. They Say It's Gonna Rain—Hazell Dean
16. I Should Be So Lucky—Kylie Minogue
17. Cross My Broken Heart -- Sinitta
18. Got To Be Certain—Kylie Minogue
19. Je Ne Sais Pas Pourquoi—Kylie Minogue
20. That's The Way It Is -- Mel & Kim
21. Blame It On The Boogie -- Big Fun
22. Showin' Out (Get Fresh At The Weekend) -- Mel & Kim
23. When You Come Back To Me (The No Probs Mix)—Jason Donovan

=== CD One Track 2/ LP Disc One Side B ===
1. Counting Every Minute—Sonia
2. Heartache -- Pepsi & Shirlie
3. Get Ready -- Carol Hitchcock
4. Every Day (I Love You More) -- Jason Donovan
5. I Only Wanna Be With You -- Samantha Fox
6. He Ain't No Competition -- Brother Beyond
7. You Think You're A Man -- Divine
8. I Haven't Stopped Dancing Yet—Pat & Mick
9. The Loco-motion—Kylie Minogue
10. Back In My Arms (Once Again) -- Hazell Dean
11. I'm So Beautiful—Divine
12. The Harder I Try (The Hardest Mix) —Brother Beyond
13. Whatever I Do (Wherever I Go) -- Hazell Dean
14. Tears On My Pillow—Kylie Minogue
15. Especially for You—Kylie Minogue & Jason Donovan
16. Ferry 'Cross the Mersey -- The Christians, Holly Johnson, Paul McCartney, Gerry Marsden & Stock Aitken Waterman
17. End Of The World—Sonia

=== CD Two Track 1/ LP Disc Two Side A ===
1. In The Heat Of A Passionate Moment—Princess
2. You'll Never Stop Me Loving You—Sonia
3. Never Too Late—Kylie Minogue
4. Better The Devil You Know—Kylie Minogue
5. I Don't Believe In Miracles—Sinitta
6. All Of Me (Boy Oh Boy) -- Sabrina
7. Take Me To Your Heart—Rick Astley
8. Maybe (We Should Call It A Day) -- Hazell Dean
9. Toy Boy—Sinitta
10. G.T.O. -- Sinitta
11. All The Way—England Football Team
12. Nothing Can Divide Us—Jason Donovan
13. Let's All Chant -- Pat & Mick
14. Hand On Your Heart—Kylie Minogue
15. S.S. Paparazzi—Stock Aitken Waterman
16. Success -- Sigue Sigue Sputnik
17. Love's About To Change My Heart (Edit) -- Donna Summer
18. Happenin' All Over Again (Hip House Radio Mix) -- Lonnie Gordon
19. Can't Shake The Feeling—Big Fun
20. Use It Up And Wear It Out—Pat & Mick

=== CD Two Track 2/ LP Disc Two Side B ===
1. Love Is War -- Brilliant
2. Tell Me Tomorrow—Princess
3. The Heaven I Need -- The Three Degrees
4. Another Night—Jason Donovan
5. When Love Takes Over You (Remix) -- Donna Summer
6. Somebody—Brilliant
7. Rhythm of the Rain—Jason Donovan
8. Turn It Into Love—Hazell Dean
9. I'll Keep On Loving You—Princess
10. My Arms Keep Missing You—Rick Astley
11. Hang On To Your Love—Jason Donovan
12. Who's Leaving Who—Hazell Dean
13. Nothing's Gonna Stop Me Now—Samantha Fox
14. Too Many Broken Hearts—Jason Donovan
15. F.L.M. -- Mel & Kim
16. Respectable—Mel & Kim
17. Just Don't Have The Heart -- Cliff Richard
18. Ain't Nothing But A House Party -- Phil Fearon
19. I'd Rather Jack -- The Reynolds Girls
20. Listen To Your Heart—Sonia
21. Handful Of Promises—Big Fun

== See also ==
- Mike Stock
- List of songs that were written or produced by SAW (in chronological order, including US and UK chart positions)
- The Hit Factory : The Best of Stock Aitken Waterman. (1987 UK compilation album released by Stylus Records).
- The Hit Factory Volume 2. (1988 UK/Japan compilation album released by Fanfare Records and PWL Records.)
- The Hit Factory Volume 3. (1989 compilation album released by Fanfare Records and PWL Records.)
- The Hit Factory : Pete Waterman's Greatest Hits. (2000 compilation issued by Universal Music.)
- Stock Aitken Waterman Gold. (2005 compilation released by PWL Records in association with Sony BMG).

== Official Site ==
Mike Stock Music
