= Stock Aitken Waterman Gold =

Compilation album by Various artists
- Released: 2005
- Recorded: 1984–1991
- Genre: Pop
- Label: Sony BMG/PWL Records/EBUL
- Producer: Stock Aitken Waterman

Stock Aitken Waterman Gold is a compilation album released in 2005 by Sony BMG, PWL Records and EBUL.

== Overview ==
Gold is a triple CD collection that brings together the biggest hits of British producers Stock Aitken Waterman. All of the tracks were big hits when released internationally between 1984 and 1991 - the production trio's most successful period.

As a complete overview of Stock Aitken Waterman's most popular work, Gold contains nine UK number one hits by several different artists, two of which were recorded to raise money for charity. The producer's success on the US chart is represented by three Billboard Hot 100 number one's: Rick Astley's "Never Gonna Give You Up" and "Together Forever", and Bananarama's "Venus". The girl-group Boy Krazy also feature, although not successful in the UK, they achieved notable success with "That's What Love Can Do" which made the Billboard Hot 100 Top 20 and was the last Stock Aitken Waterman Production before Matt Aitken departed in 1991. A Japanese-only release, "Turn It into Love" by Kylie Minogue rounds off the collection; this song was not issued as an A side in the UK, it was actually covered and released by PWL stablemate Hazell Dean instead, and whose bigger UK hits are included on this collection. A bonus track can be found at the end of the second disc: Mandy Smith's original recording of Kylie Minogue's second international release "Got to Be Certain", unearthed from the PWL vaults. With an identical backing track, the only difference between the recordings are Mandy's vocals instead of Kylie's.

Stock Aitken Waterman Gold contains the standard radio edits of the track listing, with extended mixes, rarities and a megamix saved entirely for the third disc.

== Track listing ==
Disc One

1. Rick Astley – Never Gonna Give You Up (UK #1)
2. Bananarama – Venus (US #1)
3. Dead or Alive - You Spin Me Round (Like a Record) (UK #1)
4. Kylie Minogue – I Should Be So Lucky (UK #1)
5. Mel and Kim – Respectable (UK #1)
6. Jason Donovan – Too Many Broken Hearts (UK #1)
7. Hazell Dean – Who's Leaving Who
8. Sinitta – Toy Boy
9. Big Fun – Blame It on the Boogie
10. Donna Summer – This Time I Know It's for Real
11. Lonnie Gordon - Happenin' All Over Again
12. Brother Beyond – The Harder I Try
13. Sonia – You'll Never Stop Me Loving You (UK #1)
14. The Reynolds Girls - I’d Rather Jack
15. Samantha Fox – Nothing's Gonna Stop Me Now
16. Cliff Richard - I Just Don't Have the Heart
17. Princess - Say I’m Your Number One
18. Stock Aitken Waterman – Roadblock
19. Kylie Minogue & Jason Donovan - Especially for You (UK #1)

Disc Two

1. Kylie Minogue – Better the Devil You Know
2. Bananarama – Love in the First Degree
3. Rick Astley – Together Forever (US #1)
4. Sinitta - Cross My Broken Heart
5. Mel and Kim – Showing Out (Get Fresh At The Weekend)
6. Divine – You Think You're a Man
7. Hazell Dean – Whatever I Do (Wherever I Go)
8. Jason Donovan – When You Come Back To Me
9. Donna Summer - I Don't Wanna Get Hurt
10. Dead or Alive - Lover Come Back To Me
11. Brother Beyond - He Ain't No Competition
12. Sonia – Listen To Your Heart
13. Big Fun - Can't Shake the Feeling
14. Pat and Mick - I Haven't Stopped Dancing Yet
15. Kylie Minogue - Turn It into Love
16. Boy Krazy - That's What Love Can Do
17. Ferry Aid - "Let It Be" (UK #1)
18. Hillsborough Disaster Fund - Ferry Cross the Mersey (UK #1)
19. Mandy – Got to Be Certain ^{(Bonus Track)}

Disc Three - Rarities

1. Dead or Alive – You Spin Me Round (Like a Record) (Murder Mix)
2. Kylie Minogue – Better the Devil You Know (The Mad March Hare Mix)
3. Rick Astley – Never Gonna Give You Up (Escape From N.Y Mix)
4. Divine – You Think You're A Man (12" Remix)
5. The Reynolds Girls - I’d Rather Jack (Extended Mix)
6. Stock Aitken Waterman - Roadblock (Unreleased Mix)
7. Princess – Say I'm Your Number One (Extended Mix)
8. Mandy Smith – I Just Can’t Wait (Matt’s Cool & Breezy Jazzy Mix)
9. Lonnie Gordon - Beyond Your Wildest Dreams (12” version)
10. PWL Radio Megamix 2005
  ^{Including excerpts of the following tracks: Stock Aitken Waterman "S.S. Paparazzi", Rick Astley "Whenever You Need Somebody", Jason Donovan "Nothing Can Divide Us", The Twins "All Mixed Up", Lonnie Gordon "Happenin' All Over Again", The Reynolds Girls "I'd Rather Jack" and Carol Hitchcock "Get Ready".}

== See also ==
- Mike Stock
- List of songs that were written or produced by SAW (in chronological order, including US and UK chart positions)
- The Hit Factory : The Best of Stock Aitken Waterman. (1987 UK compilation album released by Stylus Records).
- The Hit Factory Volume 2. (1988 UK/Japan compilation album released by Fanfare Records and PWL Records.)
- The Hit Factory Volume 3. (1989 compilation album released by Fanfare Records and PWL Records.)
- A Ton Of Hits : The Very Best of Stock Aitken Waterman. (1990 compilation released by Chrysalis Records, trading as Dover Records.)
- The Hit Factory : Pete Waterman's Greatest Hits. (2000 compilation issued by Universal Music.)
- Pete Waterman Presents The Hit Factory. (2012 compilation issued by Sony Music).
