= The Hit Factory Volume 2 =

The Hit Factory: The Best of Stock Aitken Waterman Vol 2

Compilation album by various artists
- Released: 1988
- Genre: Pop
- Label: Fanfare Records, PWL Records
- Producer: Stock Aitken Waterman

Various artists chronology
The Hit Factory: The Best of Stock Aitken Waterman (1987)	The Hit Factory: The Best of Stock Aitken Waterman Vol 2 (1988)	Hit Factory 3: The Best of Stock Aitken Waterman (1989)

The Hit Factory: The Best of Stock Aitken Waterman Vol 2 is a compilation album released in November 1988 by Fanfare Records and PWL Records. It is an album featuring hits produced by British production trio Stock Aitken Waterman, who were at their peak at the time of the album's release.

== Release ==
The first compilation, The Hit Factory: The Best of Stock Aitken Waterman, was issued by Stylus Records in 1987. The range of tracks on Volume 2 includes four special 12" remixes, exclusive to the set, and also a previously unavailable track by American group Sequal. The album gained a platinum BPI Award and reached No. 16 in the UK Top 100 Albums Chart. When compilation albums were excluded from the main chart on January 14, 1989, the album crossed to the new UK Compilation Chart for the remainder of its run.

The Hit Factory Vol 2 was also released in Japan by PWL in association with Alfa Records. Although the albums share the same name, they have an entirely different track listing.

== Track listings ==
UK track listing (UK: Fanfare Records/PWL Records HFCD 4)

1. "Nothing Can Divide Us" (Exclusive 12" Remix) : Jason Donovan
2. "Love in the First Degree" : Bananarama
3. "Who's Leaving Who" : Hazell Dean
4. "The Harder I Try" : Brother Beyond
5. "I Don't Believe in Miracles" : Sinitta
6. "All of Me (Boy Oh Boy)" : Sabrina
7. "Packjammed (With the Party Posse)" (Writ Mix - Short Version) : Stock Aitken Waterman
8. "What a Night" : Dolly Dots^{†}
9. "I Should Be So Lucky" (Exclusive 12" Remix) : Kylie Minogue
10. "That's the Way It Is" : Mel and Kim
11. "My Arms Keep Missing You" (Exclusive 12" Remix) : Rick Astley ^{††}
12. "Tell Him I Called" [Album Version] : Sequal ^{††}
13. "Cross My Broken Heart" (Exclusive 12" Remix) : Sinitta
14. "Let's Get Together Tonite" : Steve Walsh ^{††}
15. "Let's All Chant" : Pat and Mick

^{†} This track was not included on the LP version of the collection, presumably due to time restrictions.
^{††} Not featured on the VHS version.

Japan track listing (Japan: Alfa Records/PWL 29B2-50)

- "Especially for You" (Extended Version) : Kylie and Jason
- "The Loco-Motion" (The Sankie Mix) [Short] : Kylie Minogue
- "Nothing Can Divide Us" (Hit Factory 2 Remix) : Jason Donovan
- "Victim of Pleasure" (Justin Strauss Mix) : Mandy
- "I Haven't Stopped Dancin' Yet" (Extended Version) : Pat and Mick
- "Sky High" (Extended Version) : Jigsaw
- "Safe in the Arms of Love" (Extra Beat Boys Remix) : Shooting Party
- "Say It's Love (Love House)" (Extra Beat This Mix) : Mandy
- "I Only Wanna Be with You" (Extended Mix) : Samantha Fox
- "S.S. Paparazzi" (The Crowning King Mix) : Stock Aitken Waterman

== See also ==
- Mike Stock
- List of songs that were written or produced by SAW (in chronological order, including US and UK chart positions)
- The Hit Factory: The Best of Stock Aitken Waterman. (1987 UK compilation album released by Stylus Records).
- The Hit Factory Volume 3. (1989 compilation album released by Fanfare Records and PWL Records.)
- A Ton of Hits: The Very Best of Stock Aitken Waterman. (1990 compilation released by Chrysalis Records, trading as Dover Records.)
- The Hit Factory: Pete Waterman's Greatest Hits. (2000 compilation issued by Universal Music.)
- Stock Aitken Waterman Gold. (2005 compilation released by PWL Records in association with Sony BMG).
- Pete Waterman Presents the Hit Factory. (2012 compilation issued by Sony Music).

== Official site ==
Mike Stock
