= The Hit Factory: Pete Waterman's Greatest Hits =

Compilation album by various artists
- Released: 2000
- Recorded: 1982–1999
- Genre: Pop
- Length: 2:27:41
- Label: Universal Music
- Producer: Pete Waterman, Peter Collins, Stock Aitken Waterman, Mike Stock, Steve Mac, Opus III, Phil Wilde, Jean-Paul De Coster, Mark Topham, Karl Twigg, Work in Progress.

The Hit Factory: Pete Waterman's Greatest Hits is a compilation album featuring music produced or jointly-produced by Pete Waterman. It was released by Universal Music in 2000 and reached #3 in the UK compilation Top 20 chart, achieving a Gold BPI award.

Unlike previous releases called The Hit Factory, this album concentrated on Waterman's productions outside his most successful Stock Aitken Waterman era and also included a couple of big hits that were exclusively licensed to his PWL Records label in which he had little production involvement.

The album features thirteen UK #1 hits and two further US #1's.

== Track listing ==
Disc one

1. "I Should Be So Lucky" - Kylie Minogue
2. "Never Gonna Give You Up" - Rick Astley
3. "Too Many Broken Hearts" - Jason Donovan
4. "Venus" - Bananarama
5. "Respectable" - Mel & Kim
6. "The Harder I Try" - Brother Beyond
7. "Say I'm Your Number One" - Princess
8. "Wouldn't It Be Good" - Nik Kershaw
9. "This Time I Know It's For Real" - Donna Summer
10. "I Just Don't Have The Heart" - Cliff Richard
11. "I Want You Back" - Bananarama
12. "Pass the Dutchie" - Musical Youth
13. "The Grease Megamix" - John Travolta & Olivia Newton-John
14. "Baker Street" - Undercover
15. "It's a Fine Day" - Opus III
16. "No Limit" - 2 Unlimited
17. "Pray" - Tina Cousins
18. "Nothing's Gonna Stop Me Now" - Samantha Fox
19. "Blame It on the Boogie" - Big Fun
20. "Thank ABBA for the Music" - Steps, Tina Cousins, Cleopatra, B*witched, Billie
21. "Roadblock" - Stock Aitken Waterman

Disc two

1. "Tragedy" - Steps
2. "Better the Devil You Know" - Kylie Minogue
3. "You Spin Me Round (Like a Record)" - Dead or Alive
4. "Love in the First Degree" - Bananarama
5. "Together Forever" - Rick Astley
6. "Showing Out (Get Fresh at the Weekend)" - Mel & Kim
7. "Whatever I Do (Wherever I Go)" - Hazell Dean
8. "I Want You Back (PWL Remix '88)" - Jackson Five
9. "You'll Never Stop Me Loving You" - Sonia
10. "I Won't Let the Sun Go Down on Me" - Nik Kershaw
11. "If You Were with Me Now" - Kylie Minogue & Keith Washington
12. "Every Day (I Love You More)" - Jason Donovan
13. "One For Sorrow" - Steps
14. "Chiquitita" - Stephen Gately
15. "Sealed with a Kiss" - Jason Donovan
16. "Seasons in the Sun" - Westlife
17. "Especially for You" - Kylie Minogue & Jason Donovan
18. "Tragedy" (music video) - Steps

== See also ==
- List of songs that were written or produced by SAW (in chronological order, including US and UK chart positions)
- The Hit Factory : The Best of Stock Aitken Waterman. (1987 UK compilation album released by Stylus Records).
- The Hit Factory Volume 2. (1988 UK/Japan compilation album released by Fanfare Records and PWL Records.)
- The Hit Factory Volume 3. (1989 compilation album released by Fanfare Records and PWL Records.)
- A Ton Of Hits : The Very Best of Stock Aitken Waterman. (1990 compilation released by Chrysalis Records, trading as Dover Records.)
- Stock Aitken Waterman Gold. (2005 compilation released by PWL Records in association with Sony BMG).
- Pete Waterman Presents The Hit Factory. (2012 compilation issued by Sony Music).
