= The Hit Factory: The Best of Stock Aitken Waterman =

Compilation album by various artists
- Released: 1987
- Genre: Pop
- Label: Stylus Records, PWL Records
- Producer: Stock Aitken Waterman

Various artists chronology
The Hit Factory: The Best of Stock Aitken Waterman (1987)	The Hit Factory: The Best of Stock Aitken Waterman Vol 2 (1988)

Professional ratings
Review scores
Source	Rating
Smash Hit	8 1/2/10

The Hit Factory: The Best of Stock Aitken Waterman is a compilation album released in 1987 by Stylus Records in association with PWL Records. The collection brought together some the biggest hits by British production team Stock Aitken Waterman. It reached #18 in the UK Top 100 Album Chart and achieved a Gold BPI award.

Several tracks are presented in remix form, or at least in some variation from their standard radio edit and are listed as such. Twelve of the 14 tracks were also featured on a video collection.

== Track listing ==
(1987:STYLUS/PWL SMD 740)

Side One

1. "Never Gonna Give You Up" : Rick Astley
2. "Toy Boy" (Extra Muscle Mix) : Sinitta
3. "I'll Keep on Loving You" : Princess
4. "I Heard a Rumour" : Bananarama
5. "Whatever I Do (Wherever I Go)" (Hit Factory Mix) : Hazell Dean
6. "New York Afternoon" : Mondo Kane featuring Georgie Fame
7. "Let It Be" : Ferry Aid

Side Two

1. "F.L.M. : Mel & Kim
2. "Nothing's Gonna Stop Me" (Jump & Jive Mix) : Samantha Fox
3. "Venus" : Bananarama
4. "Get Ready" : Carol Hitchcock
5. "Say I'm Your Number One" : Princess
6. "I Just Can't Wait" : Mandy
7. "Roadblock" (Edit) : Stock Aitken Waterman

== Video Track listing ==
(WIENERWORLD WNR 1042)

1. "Never Gonna Give You Up" : Rick Astley
2. "I Heard a Rumour" : Bananarama
3. "Toy Boy" : Sinitta
4. "Whatever Makes Our Love Grow" : Edwin Starr
5. "F.L.M." : Mel & Kim
6. "Ain't Nothing but a House Party" : Phil Fearon
7. "Get Ready" : Carol Hitchcock
8. "I'll Keep on Loving You" : Princess
9. "The Heaven I Need" : The Three Degrees
10. "I Just Can't Wait" : Mandy
11. "Say I'm Your Number One" : Princess
12. "Let It Be" : Ferry Aid
13. "Venus" : Bananarama
14. "Roadblock" : Stock Aitken Waterman

== Japan Track listing ==
(1988:ALFA 32XB-286)

Listed as THE HIT FACTORY featuring STOCK AITKEN WATERMAN

- Packjammed (With The Party Posse) (12" Remix) : Stock Aitken Waterman
- I Should Be So Lucky (Extended Version) : Kylie Minogue
- I Just Can't Wait (Extended Version) : Mandy
- Nothing's Gonna Stop Me Now (Extended Mix) : Samantha Fox
- Positive Reaction (Our Mandy's Extended Mix) : Mandy
- Let's All Chant (Something For The Kids Mix) : Pat & Mick
- I'm The One Who Really Loves You (12" Remix) : Austin Howard
- Roadblock (Extended Version) : Stock Aitken Waterman
- Whatever Makes Our Love Grow (Extended Version)—Edwin Starr
- I Should Be So Lucky (The Bicentennial Remix)—Kylie Minogue

== See also ==
- Mike Stock
- List of songs that were written or produced by SAW (in chronological order, including US and UK chart positions)
- The Hit Factory Volume 2. (1988 UK/Japan compilation album released by Fanfare Records and PWL Records.)
- The Hit Factory Volume 3. (1989 compilation album released by Fanfare Records and PWL Records.)
- A Ton Of Hits : The Very Best of Stock Aitken Waterman. (1990 compilation released by Chrysalis Records, trading as Dover Records.)
- The Hit Factory : Pete Waterman's Greatest Hits. (2000 compilation issued by Universal Music.)
- Stock Aitken Waterman Gold. (2005 compilation released by PWL Records in association with Sony BMG).
- Now That's What I Call Music
- The Hits Album
