= Delage (group) =

British girl group

Delage were a British girl group, with four members (named Rhonda, Karena, Charlotte and Judy) promoted by the record production trio, Stock Aitken Waterman. The band was constructed through an audition process, advertised through a casting call.

The initial promo pressings of their first single carried the group name "Dazzle", but it was later changed to "Delage" with the advent of the hired line up and associated marketing campaign.

Their first single issued in December 1990, was a cover of the Hues Corporation hit, "Rock the Boat", backed with the Stock Aitken Waterman-penned "I Wanna Be Your Everything". It reached No. 63 on the UK Singles Chart.

Soon after the release of the single, Judy and Charlotte left the band and two new members, Emma and Frances, were recruited as replacements. This line-up debuted as backing dancers on the video clip to Pat & Mick's "Gimme Some" in April 1991. A follow-up single was issued by this new lineup in June 1991 called "Running Back for More", backed with "I Wanna Shout About It", both written by Stock Aitken Waterman which reached No. 155 in the UK chart..

Delage recorded one more song with Stock Aitken Waterman, "Ain't No Cure" (a cover of a Bananarama song) which was not released at the time. A 12" version of "Ain't No Cure" was released in 1997, on the Australian only compilation album 12 Inch Classics Volume 3 – The Hit Factory. In August 2009, several tracks and remixes of the group were made available on iTunes in the UK, including the unreleased 7" version of "Ain't No Cure", amongst others.

In 1992, the group changed their name to Eden, and released two further singles, "Can This Be Love" (produced by Bruce Forest) and "Keep On Pushing Our Love" in continental Europe, to little success.
