= The Hit Factory Volume 3 =

Compilation album by various artists
- Released: 1989
- Genre: Pop
- Label: PWL Records
- Producer: Stock Aitken Waterman

The Hit Factory Volume 3 is a compilation album collecting the biggest hits of the award-winning British music production trio Stock Aitken Waterman during their most successful era. It was released by PWL Records in association with Fanfare Records in June 1989 and reached #3 in the compilation Top 20, achieving a Gold BPI award.

Some critics highlighted the negative aspects of the release: it contained 2 B Sides ("Made in Heaven" and "Wrap My Arms Around You"), 5 cover versions ("Turn It Into Love", "Help!", "I Only Wanna Be With You", "I Haven't Stopped Dancing Yet" and "Ferry 'Cross the Mersey"), a major flop ("S.S. Paparazzi") and the remaining 3 tracks were considered weak songs ("Take Me To Your Heart", "I'd Rather Jack" and "He Ain't No Competition") although they all reached the UK Top 10. Kylie Minogue and Jason Donovan's duet "Especially for You" was however one of the biggest selling singles of the 1980s.

== Critical reception ==
Professional ratings
Review scores
Source	Rating
Number One	5/5 stars

Edwin Pouncey left small ironic review on this compilation for New Musical Express with negative assessment. From whole tracklist he found warm words only for The Reynolds Girls track. He wrote: "Thatcher friendly producers SAW plan to rake more dosh out of the pockets of the poor, deluded sods who buy their records" and summarised: "There's nothing here your mother wouldn't like."

== Track listings ==
UK Track listing (2xCD/LP: UK Fanfare/PWL HFCD/LP 8) (Video: VHF8)

Disc one

- Take Me to Your Heart : Rick Astley
- I'd Rather Jack : The Reynolds Girls
- Made in Heaven : Kylie Minogue (B Side to "Je Ne Sais Pas Pourquoi")
- Turn It Into Love : Hazell Dean (Originally recorded by Kylie Minogue)
- Help! : Bananarama & Lananeeneenoonoo (Originally recorded by The Beatles)
- Especially for You : Kylie & Jason
- He Ain't No Competition : Brother Beyond
- I Only Wanna Be with You : Samantha Fox (Originally a #4 hit for Dusty Springfield in 1963)
- I Haven't Stopped Dancing Yet : Pat & Mick (Originally a Top 20 hit for Gonzalez in 1979)
- S.S. Paparazzi (The Boys Have A Go Back Mix) : Stock Aitken Waterman
- Wrap My Arms Around You : Jason Donovan (B Side to "Too Many Broken Hearts")
- Ferry 'Cross the Mersey : Various (Originally recorded by Gerry & The Pacemakers)

Disc two

Pumping Party Mix One (17.43)

- Turn It Into Love : Hazell Dean
- Take Me To Your Heart : Rick Astley
- Made in Heaven : Kylie Minogue
- I Only Wanna Be with You : Samantha Fox

Pumping Party Mix Two (24.22)

- I'd Rather Jack : Reynolds Girls
- S.S. Paparazzi : Stock Aitken Waterman
- He Ain't No Competition : Brother Beyond
- I Haven't Stopped Dancing Yet : Pat & Mick
- Help! : Bananarama

The video compilation included all the above tracks with the exception of Jason Donovan Wrap My Arms Around You, of which no video was made. An exclusive was Kylie Minogue Made in Heaven. Due to be a double A side with Je Ne Sais Pas Pourquoi but decided against at the last minute.

== See also ==
- Mike Stock
- List of songs that were written or produced by SAW (in chronological order, including US and UK chart positions)
- The Hit Factory : The Best of Stock Aitken Waterman. (1987 UK compilation album released by Stylus Records).
- The Hit Factory Volume 2. (1988 compilation album released by Fanfare Records and PWL Records.)
- A Ton Of Hits : The Very Best of Stock Aitken Waterman. (1990 compilation released by Chrysalis Records, trading as Dover Records.)
- The Hit Factory : Pete Waterman's Greatest Hits. (2000 compilation issued by Universal Music.)
- Stock Aitken Waterman Gold. (2005 compilation released by PWL Records in association with Sony BMG).
