= List of songs produced by Stock Aitken Waterman =

This is a list of songs produced by English production trio Stock Aitken Waterman.

== 1984 ==
Date	Artist	Title	Written by	Produced by	UK Chart	US Chart	AUS Chart	Album
5 May 1984	Andy Paul	"Anna Maria Lena"	Paul	Stock, Aitken, Waterman, Ware	—	—	—	(non-album)
May 1984	Agents Aren't Aeroplanes	"The Upstroke"	Ware, Stock, Aitken	Stock, Aitken, Waterman, Ware	93	—	—	(non-album)
May 1984	Agents Aren't Aeroplanes	"Shadow Man"	Seabrook, Seabrook	Stock, Aitken, Waterman, Ware	—	—	—	B-side
14 Jul 1984	Divine	"You Think You're a Man"	Deane	Stock, Aitken, Waterman, Evangeli	16	—	8	The Story So Far
14 Jul 1984	Divine	"Give it Up"	Stock, Aitken	Stock, Aitken, Waterman, Ware	—	—	—	B-side
16 Jul 1984	Hazell Dean	"Whatever I Do (Wherever I Go)"	Stock, Aitken	Stock, Aitken, Waterman	4	—	74	Heart First
Aug 1984	Edwina Laurie	"Dark Glasses"	Kershaw	Stock, Aitken, Waterman	185	—	—	(non-album)
Aug 1984	Edwina Laurie	"Tangle of Emotions"	Laurie, Stock, Aitken	Stock, Aitken, Waterman	—	—	—	B-side
22 Oct 1984	Hazell Dean	"Back in My Arms (Once Again)"	Stock, Aitken	Stock, Aitken, Waterman	41	—	—	Heart First
Oct 1984	Divine	"I'm So Beautiful"	Stock, Aitken	Stock, Aitken, Waterman, Evangeli	52	—	—	The Story So Far
Oct 1984	Divine	"Show Me Around"	Klein, Walsh	Stock, Aitken, Waterman	—	—	—	B-side
Oct 1984	Girl Talk	"Can the Rhythm"	Wright	Stock, Aitken, Waterman	92	—	—	(non-album)
01 Nov 1984	Hazell Dean	"Break the Rules"	Shelley, Roth, Woloshuk	Stock, Aitken, Waterman	—	—	—	Heart First
01 Nov 1984	Hazell Dean	"Devil in You"	Dean	Stock, Aitken, Waterman	—	—	—	Heart First
01 Nov 1984	Hazell Dean	"Everything I Need"	Bradley, Dean	Stock, Aitken, Waterman	—	—	—	Heart First
01 Nov 1984	Hazell Dean	"Harmony"	Clift, Marsh	Stock, Aitken, Waterman	—	—	—	Heart First
01 Nov 1984	Hazell Dean	"Heart First"	Pickus, Thomas	Stock, Aitken, Waterman	—	—	—	Heart First
01 Nov 1984	Hazell Dean	"You're Too Good to Be True"	Dean	Stock, Aitken, Waterman	—	—	—	Heart First
05 Nov 1984	Dead or Alive	"You Spin Me Round (Like a Record)"	Burns, Coy, Lever, Percy	Stock, Aitken, Waterman	1	11	3	Youthquake
1984	Rick Le Vay	"Love My Way"	Ashton, Butler, Butler, Ely	Stock, Aitken, Waterman	—	—	—	Chunks of Funk
1984	The Lewis's	"Behind a Painted Smile"	Hunter, Verd	Stock, Aitken, Waterman	—	—	—	Chunks of Funk

== 1985 ==
Date	Artist	Title	Written by	Produced by	UK Chart	US Chart	AUS Chart	Album
18 Feb 1985	Hazell Dean	"No Fool (For Love)"	Stock, Aitken	Stock, Aitken, Waterman	41	—	—	Heart First
Feb 1985	Michael Prince	"Dance Your Love Away"	Stock, Aitken	Stock, Aitken, Waterman	—	—	—	(non-album)
Mar 1985	Spelt Like This	"Contract of the Heart"	McKenzie, Richards	Stock, Aitken, Waterman	91	—	—	(non-album)
Mar 1985	Spelt Like This	"St. Valentine's Day Mascara (Say It With Cadavers)"	McKenzie, Rawlings, Richards	Stock, Aitken, Waterman	—	—	—	B-side
08 Apr 1985	Dead or Alive	"Lover Come Back to Me"	Burns, Coy, Lever, Percy	Stock, Aitken, Waterman	11	75	13	Youthquake
3 May 1985	Dead or Alive	"I Wanna Be a Toy"	Burns, Coy, Lever, Percy	Stock, Aitken, Waterman	—	—	—	Youthquake
3 May 1985	Dead or Alive	"D.J. Hit That Button"	Burns, Coy, Lever, Percy	Stock, Aitken, Waterman	—	—	—	Youthquake
3 May 1985	Dead or Alive	"Big Daddy of the Rhythm"	Burns, Coy, Lever, Percy	Stock, Aitken, Waterman	—	—	—	Youthquake
3 May 1985	Dead or Alive	"Cake and Eat It"	Burns, Coy, Lever, Percy	Stock, Aitken, Waterman	—	—	—	Youthquake
3 May 1985	Dead or Alive	"It's Been a Long Time"	Burns, Coy, Lever, Percy	Stock, Aitken, Waterman	—	—	—	Youthquake
17 Jun 1985	Dead or Alive	"In Too Deep"	Burns, Coy, Lever, Percy	Stock, Aitken, Waterman	14	—	31	Youthquake
Jul 1985	Spelt Like This	"Stop This Rumour"	Kerner, McKenzie, Rawlings	Stock, Aitken, Waterman	—	—	—	(non-album)
Jul 1985	The Danse Society	"Say It Again"	The Danse Society	Stock, Aitken, Waterman	83	—	—	(non-album)
Aug 1985	Princess	"Say I'm Your Number One"	Stock, Aitken, Waterman	Stock, Aitken, Waterman	7	15 (Note: Peak position on the US Dance Chart)	8	Princess
09 Sep 1985	Dead or Alive	"My Heart Goes Bang (Get Me to the Doctor)"	Burns, Coy, Lever, Percy	Stock, Aitken, Waterman	23	—	41	Youthquake
23 Sep 1985	Haywoode	"Getting Closer"	Stock, Aitken, Waterman	Stock, Aitken, Waterman	67	—	—	Arrival
30 Sep 1985	Hazell Dean	"They Say It's Gonna Rain"	Dellus, Sanders	Stock, Aitken, Waterman	58	—	—	Always
30 Sep 1985	Hazell Dean	"Can't Get You Out of My Mind"	Dean	Stock, Aitken, Waterman	—	—	—	B-side
Oct 1985	Brilliant	"It's A Man's Man's Man's World"	Brown	Stock, Aitken, Waterman	58	—	—	Kiss the Lips of Life
Oct 1985	Rin Tin Tin	"Shake It! Shake It!"	Rin Tin Tin	Stock, Aitken, Waterman	—	—	—	(non-album)
Oct 1985	The Three Degrees	"The Heaven I Need"	Stock, Aitken, Waterman	Stock, Aitken, Waterman	42	—	—	(non-album)
Nov 1985	O'Chi Brown	"Whenever You Need Somebody"	Stock, Aitken, Waterman	Stock, Aitken, Waterman	97	1	—	O'Chi
Nov 1985	O'Chi Brown	"I Play Games"	Brown	Stock, Aitken, Waterman	—	—	—	B-side
Nov 1985	Princess	"After The Love Has Gone"	Stock, Aitken, Waterman	Stock, Aitken, Waterman	28	6	57	Princess

== 1986 ==
Date	Artist	Title	Written by	Produced by	UK Chart	US Chart	AUS Chart	Album
03 Mar 1986	The Three Degrees	"This is the House"	Stock, Aitken, Waterman	Stock, Aitken, Waterman	101	—	—	(non-album)
31 Mar 1986	Haywoode	"You Better Not Fool Around"	Stock, Aitken, Waterman	Stock, Aitken, Waterman	82	—	—	Arrival
Mar 1986	Brilliant	"Love is War"	Cauty, Glover, Montana, Stock, Aitken, Waterman	Stock, Aitken, Waterman	64	—	—	Kiss the Lips of Life
Mar 1986	Brilliant	"Ruby Fruit Jungle"	Cauty, Glover, Le Mesuurier, Montana	Stock, Aitken, Waterman	—	—	—	Kiss the Lips of Life
Mar 1986	Canton	"Stay With Me"	Stock, Aitken, Waterman	Stock, Aitken, Waterman	—	—	—	(non-album)
Apr 1986	Princess	"I'll Keep On Loving You"	Stock, Aitken, Waterman	Stock, Aitken, Waterman	16	—	—	Princess
19 May 1986	Bananarama	"Venus"	van Leeuwen	Stock, Aitken, Waterman	8	1	1	True Confessions
May 1986	Princess	"Anytime's the Right Time"	Stock, Aitken, Waterman	Stock, Aitken, Waterman	—	—	—	Princess
May 1986	Princess	"If It Makes You Feel Good"	Stock, Aitken, Waterman	Stock, Aitken, Waterman	—	—	—	Princess
May 1986	Princess	"Just A Teaze"	Heslop	Stock, Aitken, Waterman	—	—	—	Princess
Jun 1986	Princess	"Tell Me Tomorrow"	Stock, Aitken, Waterman	Stock, Aitken, Waterman	34	—	—	Princess
01 Jul 1986	O'Chi Brown	"100% Pure Pain"	Stock, Aitken, Waterman	Stock, Aitken, Waterman	97	—	—	O'Chi
21 Jul 1986	Mondo Kane	"New York Afternoon"	Cole	Stock, Aitken, Waterman	70	—	—	(non-album)
21 Jul 1986	Mondo Kane	"Manhattan Morning"	Stock, Aitken, Waterman	Stock, Aitken, Waterman	—	—	—	B-side
Jul 1986	Brilliant	"Somebody"	Cauty, Chester, Glover, Montana	Stock, Aitken, Waterman	67	—	—	Kiss the Lips of Life
11 Aug 1986	Bananarama	"More Than Physical"	Dallin, Fahey, Woodward, Stock, Aitken, Waterman	Stock, Aitken, Waterman	41	73	28	True Confessions
Aug 1986	Austin Howard	"I'm the One Who Really Loves You"	Stock, Aitken, Waterman	Stock, Aitken, Waterman	135	—	—	Knights & Emeralds Soundtrack
Aug 1986	Jeb Million	"Second Time Around"	Million	Stock, Aitken, Waterman	—	—	—	(non-album)
Aug 1986	Splash	Qu'est-ce Que C'est?	Stock, Aitken, Waterman	Stock, Aitken, Waterman	—	—	—	(non-album)
01 Sep 1986	Hazell Dean	"Stand Up"	Bugazzi, Tozzi, Stock, Aitken, Waterman	Stock, Aitken, Waterman	79	—	—	(non-album)
01 Sep 1986	Hazell Dean	"Love Ends Love Parts"	Dean	Stock, Aitken, Waterman	—	—	—	B-side
04 Sep 1986	Mel and Kim	"Showing Out (Get Fresh at the Weekend)"	Stock, Aitken, Waterman	Stock, Aitken, Waterman	3	78	12	F.L.M
08 Sep 1986	Dead or Alive	"Brand New Lover"	Burns, Coy, Lever, Percy	Stock, Aitken, Waterman	31	15	21	Mad, Bad, and Dangerous to Know
Sep 1986	Brilliant	"How High the Sun"	Cauty, Glover, Montana, Stock, Aitken, Waterman	Stock, Aitken, Waterman	—	—	—	Kiss the Lips of Life
Sep 1986	Brilliant	"Kiss the Lips of Life"	Cauty, Glover, Montana	Stock, Aitken, Waterman	—	—	—	Kiss the Lips of Life
Sep 1986	Brilliant	"I'll Be Your Lover"	Cauty, Glover, Montana	Stock, Aitken, Waterman	—	—	—	Kiss the Lips of Life
Sep 1986	Roland Rat	"Living Legend"	Brint, Mayer, Rat, Stock, Aitken, Waterman	Stock, Aitken, Waterman	104	—	—	Living Legend
Oct 1986	Georgie Fame	"Samba (Toda Menina Baiana)"	Gil	Stock, Aitken, Waterman	81	—	—	(non-album)
Oct 1986	Jeb Million	"Speed Up My Heartbeat"	Million	Stock, Aitken, Waterman	—	—	—	(non-album)
Oct 1986	Princess	"In the Heat of a Passionate Moment"	Stock, Aitken, Waterman	Stock, Aitken, Waterman	74	30	—	Princess
03 Nov 1986	Phil Fearon	"Ain't Nothin' But a Houseparty"	Fisher, Thomas	Stock, Aitken, Waterman	60	—	—	(non-album)
03 Nov 1986	Phil Fearon	"Burning All My Bridges"	Fearon, Stock, Aitken, Waterman	Stock, Aitken, Waterman	—	—	—	B-side
10 Nov 1986	O'Chi Brown	"Caught You in a Lie"	Stock, Aitken, Waterman	Stock, Aitken, Waterman	—	—	—	O'chi
21 Nov 1986	Dead or Alive	"Son of a Gun"	Burns, Coy, Lever, Percy	Stock, Aitken, Waterman	—	—	—	Mad, Bad, and Dangerous to Know
21 Nov 1986	Dead or Alive	"Then There Was You"	Burns, Coy, Lever, Percy	Stock, Aitken, Waterman	—	—	—	Mad, Bad, and Dangerous to Know
21 Nov 1986	Dead or Alive	"Come Inside"	Burns, Coy, Lever, Percy	Stock, Aitken, Waterman	—	—	—	Mad, Bad, and Dangerous to Know
21 Nov 1986	Dead or Alive	"I Want You"	Burns, Coy, Lever, Percy	Stock, Aitken, Waterman	—	—	—	Mad, Bad, and Dangerous to Know
21 Nov 1986	Dead or Alive	"Special Star"	Burns, Coy, Lever, Percy	Stock, Aitken, Waterman	—	—	—	Mad, Bad, and Dangerous to Know
Nov 1986	Brilliant	"The End of the World"	Dee, Kent	Stock, Aitken, Waterman	—	—	—	Kiss the Lips of Life
Nov 1986	Mondo Kane	"An Everlasting Love in an Ever-Changing World (The Doop De Do Song)"	Stock, Aitken, Waterman	Stock, Aitken, Waterman	159	—	—	(non-album)
29 Dec 1986	Dead or Alive	"Something in My House"	Burns, Coy, Lever, Percy	Stock, Aitken, Waterman	12	85	19	Mad, Bad, and Dangerous to Know
1986	Roland Rat	"Drivin'"	Brint, Mayer, Rat, Stock, Aitken, Waterman	Stock, Aitken, Waterman	—	—	—	Living Legend
1986	Roland Rat	"S.W.A.L.K."	Brint, Mayer, Rat, Stock, Aitken, Waterman	Stock, Aitken, Waterman	—	—	—	Living Legend

== 1987 ==
Date	Artist	Title	Written by	Produced by	UK Chart	US Chart	AUS Chart	Album
19 Jan 1987	Mandy Smith	"I Just Can't Wait"	Stock, Aitken, Waterman	Stock, Aitken, Waterman	91	—	91	Mandy
19 Jan 1987	Mandy Smith	"You're Never Alone"	Stock, Aitken, Waterman	Stock, Aitken, Waterman	—	—	—	Mandy
02 Feb 1987	Bananarama	"A Trick of the Night"	Jolley, Swain	Jolley, Swain, Stock, Aitken, Waterman	32	76	99	True Confessions
02 Feb 1987	Bananarama	"Set on You"	Dallin, Fahey, Woodward, Stock, Aitken, Waterman	Stock, Aitken, Waterman	—	—	—	B-side
02 Feb 1987	Morgan-McVey	"Looking Good Diving"	McVey, Morgan, Ramocon	Stock, Aitken, Waterman	176	—	—	(non-album)
02 Feb 1987	Morgan-McVey feat. Neneh Cherry	"Looking Good Diving with The Wild Bunch"	Cherry, McVey, Morgan, Ramocon	Stock, Aitken, Waterman	—	—	—	B-side
18 Feb 1987	Mel and Kim	"Respectable"	Stock, Aitken, Waterman	Stock, Aitken, Waterman	1	1	1	F.L.M.
18 Feb 1987	Mel and Kim	"From a Whisper to a Scream"	Appleby, Appleby	Stock, Aitken, Waterman	—	—	—	F.L.M.
23 Mar 1987	Dead or Alive	"Hooked on Love"	Burns, Coy, Lever, Percy	Stock, Aitken, Waterman	69	—	33	Mad, Bad, and Dangerous to Know
23 Mar 1987	Ferry Aid	"Let It Be"	Lennon, McCartney	Stock, Aitken, Waterman	1	—	28	(non-album)
13 Apr 1987	Mel and Kim	"Feel a Whole Lot Better"	Stock, Aitken, Waterman	Stock, Aitken, Waterman	—	—	—	F.L.M.
13 Apr 1987	Mel and Kim	"I'm the One Who Really Loves You"	Stock, Aitken, Waterman	Stock, Aitken, Waterman	—	11	—	F.L.M.
13 Apr 1987	Mel and Kim	"More Than Words Can Say"	Stock, Aitken, Waterman	Stock, Aitken, Waterman	—	—	—	F.L.M.
13 Apr 1987	Mel and Kim	"Who's Gonna Catch You (When You Fall)"	Stock, Aitken, Waterman, Wonder, Wright	Stock, Aitken, Waterman	—	—	—	F.L.M.
13 Apr 1987	Mel and Kim	"System"	Stock, Aitken, Waterman	Stock, Aitken, Waterman	—	—	—	F.L.M.
April 1987	Gloria Gaynor	"Be Soft With Me Tonight"	Burns, Chinn, Glenn	Stock, Aitken, Waterman, Hill	80	—	—	(non-album)
9 May 1987	Debbie Harry	"In Love With Love"	Harry, Stein	Justman, Stock, Aitken, Waterman	45	70	—	Rockbird
10 May 1987	Samantha Fox	"Nothing’s Gonna Stop Me Now"	Stock, Aitken, Waterman	Stock, Aitken, Waterman	8	80	22	Samantha Fox
May 1987	Carol Hitchcock	"Get Ready"	Robinson	Stock, Aitken, Waterman	56	—	18	(non-album)
May 1987	Carol Hitchcock	"More Than Words Can Say"	Stock, Aitken, Waterman	Stock, Aitken, Waterman	—	—	—	B-side
May 1987	The Mint Juleps	"Best of Both Worlds"	Palmer	Stock, Aitken, Waterman	—	—	—	B-side
05 Jun 1987	Laura Branigan	"Shattered Glass"	Coe, Mitchell	Stock, Aitken, Waterman	78	48	60	Touch
08 Jun 1987	Hazell Dean	"Always Doesn't Mean Forever"	Stock, Aitken, Waterman	Stock, Aitken, Waterman	92	—	—	Always
29 Jun 1987	Bananarama	"I Heard a Rumour"	Dallin, Fahey, Woodward, Stock, Aitken, Waterman	Stock, Aitken, Waterman	14	4	32	WOW!
29 Jun 1987	Mel and Kim	"F.L.M"	Stock, Aitken, Waterman	Stock, Aitken, Waterman	7	—	19	F.L.M.
Jun 1987	Precious Wilson	"Only the Strong Survive"	Butler, Gamble, Huff	Stock, Aitken, Waterman	119	—	—	(non-album)
07 Jul 1987	Laura Branigan	"Whatever I Do"	Stock, Aitken	Stock, Aitken, Waterman	—	—	—	Touch
23 Jul 1987	Stephan Remmler	"I Don't Go To USA (Janet Sankt Katrein)"	Remmler	Remmler, Stock, Aitken, Waterman	108	—	—	(non-album)
25 Jul 1987	Sinitta	"Toy Boy"	Stock, Aitken, Waterman	Stock, Aitken, Waterman	4	—	49	Sinitta!
25 Jul 1987	Stock Aitken Waterman	"Roadblock"	Stock, Aitken, Waterman	Stock, Aitken, Waterman	13	—	—	(non-album)
27 Jul 1987	Rick Astley	"Never Gonna Give You Up"	Stock, Aitken, Waterman	Stock, Aitken, Waterman	1	1	1	Whenever You Need Somebody
Jul 1987	Dolly Dots	"What A Night (Party Night)"	Stock, Aitken, Waterman	Stock, Aitken, Waterman	101	—	—	(non-album)
26 Aug 1987	Dead or Alive	"I'll Save You All My Kisses"	Burns, Coy, Lever, Percy	Stock, Aitken, Waterman	78	—	47	Mad, Bad, and Dangerous to Know
Aug 1987	Nick Straker	"A Walk in the Park '87"	Bailey	Stock, Aitken, Waterman, Hammond	82	—	—	(non-album)
04 Sep 1987	Bananarama	"Some Girls"	Dallin, Fahey, Woodward, Stock, Aitken, Waterman	Stock, Aitken, Waterman	—	—	—	WOW!
04 Sep 1987	Bananarama	"Once in a Lifetime"	Dallin, Fahey, Woodward, Stock, Aitken, Waterman	Stock, Aitken, Waterman	—	—	—	WOW!
04 Sep 1987	Bananarama	"Strike it Rich"	Dallin, Fahey, Woodward, Stock, Aitken, Waterman	Stock, Aitken, Waterman	—	—	—	WOW!
04 Sep 1987	Bananarama	"Bad For Me"	Dallin, Fahey, Woodward, Stock, Aitken, Waterman	Stock, Aitken, Waterman	—	—	—	WOW!
04 Sep 1987	Bananarama	"Come Back"	Feidman, Trevisick	Stock, Aitken, Waterman	—	—	—	WOW!
28 Sep 1987	Bananarama	"Love in the First Degree"	Dallin, Fahey, Woodward, Stock, Aitken, Waterman	Stock, Aitken, Waterman	3	48	5	WOW!
28 Sep 1987	Bananarama feat. Stock Aitken Waterman	"Mr Sleaze"	Dallin, Fahey, Woodward, Stock, Aitken, Waterman	Stock, Aitken, Waterman	—	—	—	B-side
11 Oct 1987	La Toya Jackson	"(Ain't Nobody Loves You) Like I Do"	Stock, Aitken, Waterman	Stock, Aitken, Waterman	—	—	—	La Toya
31 Oct 1987	Rick Astley	"Whenever You Need Somebody"	Stock, Aitken, Waterman	Stock, Aitken, Waterman	3	—	3	Whenever You Need Somebody
31 Oct 1987	Rick Astley	"Just Good Friends"	Astley	Stock, Aitken, Waterman	—	—	—	B-side
Oct 1987	O'chi Brown & Rick Astley	"Learning to Live (Without Your Love)"	Stock, Aitken, Waterman	Stock, Aitken, Waterman	103	—	—	O'chi
Oct 1987	Mandy Smith	"Positive Reaction"	Stock, Aitken, Waterman	Stock, Aitken, Waterman	116	—	—	Mandy
Oct 1987	Edwin Starr	"Whatever Makes Our Love Grow"	Stock, Aitken, Waterman	Stock, Aitken, Waterman	98	—	—	(non-album)
16 Nov 1987	Rick Astley	"Don't Say Goodbye"	Stock, Aitken, Waterman	Stock, Aitken, Waterman	—	—	—	Whenever You Need Somebody
30 Nov 1987	Rick Astley	"When I Fall in Love"	Heyman, Young	Stock, Aitken, Waterman	2	—	5	Whenever You Need Somebody
30 Nov 1987	Rick Astley	"My Arms Keep Missing You"	Stock, Aitken, Waterman	Stock, Aitken, Waterman	—	—	—	B-side
Nov 1987	Michael Davidson	"Turn It Up"	Davidson. Mercier	Stock, Aitken, Waterman	—	—	—	Who's That Girl
Nov 1987	Sinitta	"GTO"	Stock, Aitken Waterman	Stock, Aitken, Waterman	15	—	62	Sinitta!
26 Dec 1987	Sinitta	"Who's Gonna Catch You (When You Fall)"	Stock, Aitken, Waterman, Wonder, Wright	Stock, Aitken, Waterman	—	—	—	Sinitta!
29 Dec 1987	Bananarama	"I Can't Help It"	Dallin, Fahey, Woodward, Stock, Aitken, Waterman	Stock, Aitken, Waterman	20	47	27	WOW!
29 Dec 1987	Bananarama	"Ecstasy"	Dallin, Fahey, Woodward, Stock, Aitken, Waterman	Stock, Aitken, Waterman	—	—	—	B-side
29 Dec 1987	Kylie Minogue	"I Should Be So Lucky"	Stock, Aitken, Waterman	Stock, Aitken, Waterman	1	28	1	Kylie
Dec 1987	Stock Aitken Waterman	"Packjammed (With The Party Posse)"	Stock, Aitken, Waterman	Stock, Aitken, Waterman	41	—	—	(non-album)
Dec 1987	Steve Walsh	"Let's Get Together Tonite"	Stock, Aitken, Waterman	Stock, Aitken, Waterman	74	—	—	(non-album)

== 1988 ==
Date	Artist	Title	Written by	Produced by	UK Chart	US Chart	AUS Chart	Album
12 Jan 1988	Rick Astley	"Together Forever"	Stock, Aitken, Waterman	Stock, Aitken, Waterman	2	1	19	Whenever You Need Somebody
12 Jan 1988	Rick Astley	"I'll Never Set You Free"	Astley	Stock, Aitken, Waterman	—	—	—	B-side
15 Feb 1988	Mel and Kim	"That's the Way It Is"	Stock, Aitken, Waterman	Stock, Aitken, Waterman	10	—	28	Coming to America
15 Feb 1988	Mel and Kim	"You Changed My Life"	Appleby, Appleby, Stock, Aitken, Waterman	Stock, Aitken, Waterman	—	—	—	B-side
07 Mar 1988	Sinitta	"Cross My Broken Heart"	Stock, Aitken, Waterman	Stock, Aitken, Waterman	6	—	56	Sinitta!
21 Mar 1988	Hazell Dean	"Who's Leaving Who"	Spiro, White	Stock, Aitken, Waterman	4	19	—	Always
28 Mar 1988	Bananarama	"I Want You Back"	Dallin, Fahey, Woodward, Stock, Aitken, Waterman	Stock, Aitken, Waterman	5	—	3	WOW!
28 Mar 1988	Bananarama feat. Stock Aitken Waterman	"Amnesia (The Theme From The Roxy)"	Stock, Aitken, Waterman	Stock, Aitken, Waterman	—	—	—	B-side
25 Apr 1988	Mandy Smith	"He's My Boy"	Stock, Aitken, Waterman	Stock, Aitken, Waterman	—	—	—	Mandy
Apr 1988	Pat and Mick	"Let's All Chant"	Fields, Zager	Stock, Aitken, Waterman	11	—	—	(non-album)
Apr 1988	Pat and Mick	"On the Night"	Stock, Aitken, Waterman	Stock, Aitken, Waterman	—	—	—	B-side
2 May 1988	Kylie Minogue	"Got to Be Certain"	Stock, Aitken, Waterman	Stock, Aitken, Waterman	2	—	1	Kylie
May 1988	E.G. Daily	"Mind Over Matter"	Jay, Palombi	Stock, Aitken, Waterman	96	17	—	(non-album)
May 1988	England Football Team feat. Stock Aitken Waterman	"All the Way"	Stock, Aitken, Waterman	Stock, Aitken, Waterman	64	—	—	(non-album)
13 Jun 1988	Hazell Dean	"Maybe (We Should Call It A Day)"	Stock, Aitken, Waterman	Stock, Aitken, Waterman	15	—	—	Always
04 Jul 1988	Kylie Minogue	"I Miss You"	Stock, Aitken, Waterman	Stock, Aitken, Waterman	—	—	—	Kylie
04 Jul 1988	Kylie Minogue	"I'll Still Be Loving You"	Stock, Aitken, Waterman	Stock, Aitken, Waterman	—	—	—	Kylie
04 Jul 1988	Kylie Minogue	"Look My Way"	Stock, Aitken, Waterman	Stock, Aitken, Waterman	—	—	—	Kylie
04 Jul 1988	Kylie Minogue	"Love at First Sight"	Stock, Aitken, Waterman	Stock, Aitken, Waterman	—	—	—	Kylie
18 Jul 1988	Brother Beyond	"The Harder I Try"	Stock, Aitken, Waterman	Stock, Aitken, Waterman	2	—	78	Get Even II
28 Jul 1988	Kylie Minogue	"The Loco-Motion"	Goffin, King	Stock, Aitken, Waterman	2	3	—	Kylie
Jul 1988	Sabrina	"All of Me (Boy Oh Boy)"	Stock, Aitken, Waterman	Stock, Aitken, Waterman	25	—	—	Super Sabrina
29 Aug 1988	Jason Donovan	"Nothing Can Divide Us"	Stock, Aitken, Waterman	Stock, Aitken, Waterman	5	—	3	Ten Good Reasons
12 Sep 1988	Bananarama	"Love, Truth and Honesty"	Dallin, O'Sullivan, Woodward, Stock, Aitken, Waterman	Stock, Aitken, Waterman	23	89	32	The Greatest Hits Collection
12 Sep 1988	Hazell Dean	"Turn It into Love"	Stock, Aitken, Waterman	Stock, Aitken, Waterman	21	38	—	Always
14 Sep 1988	Sinitta	"I Don't Believe in Miracles"	Stock, Aitken, Waterman	Stock, Aitken, Waterman	22	—	—	Wicked
10 Oct 1988	Kylie Minogue	"Je ne sais pas pourquoi"	Stock, Aitken, Waterman	Stock, Aitken, Waterman	2	—	11	Kylie
10 Oct 1988	Kylie Minogue	"Made in Heaven"	Stock, Aitken, Waterman	Stock, Aitken, Waterman	—	—	—	B-side
25 Oct 1988	La Toya Jackson	"(Tell Me) She Means Nothing To You At All"	Stock, Aitken, Waterman	Stock, Aitken, Waterman	—	—	—	La Toya
25 Oct 1988	La Toya Jackson	"Just Say No"	Stock, Aitken, Waterman	Stock, Aitken, Waterman	—	—	—	La Toya
Oct 1988	Sequal	"Tell Him I Called"	Stock, Aitken, Waterman	Stock, Aitken, Waterman	119	—	—	Sequal
07 Nov 1988	Rick Astley	"It Would Take a Strong Strong Man"	Stock, Aitken, Waterman	Stock, Aitken, Waterman	—	10	—	Whenever You Need Somebody
07 Nov 1988	Bananarama	"Nathan Jones"	Caston, Wakefield	Stock, Aitken, Waterman	15	—	59	WOW!
07 Nov 1988	Sigue Sigue Sputnik	"Success"	Degville, James, Whitmore	Stock, Aitken, Waterman	31	—	—	Dress for Excess
21 Nov 1988	Rick Astley	"Take Me to Your Heart"	Stock, Aitken, Waterman	Stock, Aitken, Waterman	8	—	41	Hold Me in Your Arms
21 Nov 1988	Rick Astley	"I'll Be Fine"	Stock, Aitken, Waterman	Stock, Aitken, Waterman	—	—	—	B-side
26 Nov 1988	Rick Astley	"I Don't Wanna Lose Her"	Stock, Aitken, Waterman	Stock, Aitken, Waterman	—	—	—	Hold Me in Your Arms
26 Nov 1988	Rick Astley	"Till Then (Time Stands Still)"	Stock, Aitken, Waterman	Stock, Aitken, Waterman	—	—	—	Hold Me in Your Arms
28 Nov 1988	Kylie Minogue & Jason Donovan	"Especially for You"	Stock, Aitken, Waterman	Stock, Aitken, Waterman	1	—	2	Ten Good Reasons
28 Nov 1988	Kylie Minogue & Jason Donovan	"All I Wanna Do Is Make You Mine"	Stock, Aitken, Waterman	Stock, Aitken, Waterman	—	—	—	B-side
Nov 1988	Brother Beyond	"He Ain't No Competition"	Stock, Aitken, Waterman	Stock, Aitken, Waterman	6	—	53	Get Even II
Nov 1988	Samantha Fox	"You Started Something"	Stock, Aitken, Waterman	Stock, Aitken, Waterman	—	—	—	I Wanna Have Some Fun
Nov 1988	Stock Aitken Waterman	"S.S. Paparazzi"	Stock, Aitken, Waterman	Stock, Aitken, Waterman	68	—	—	(non-album)
15 Dec 1988	Kylie Minogue	"It's No Secret"	Stock, Aitken, Waterman	Stock, Aitken, Waterman	—	37	—	Kylie
21 Dec 1988	Kylie Minogue	"Turn It into Love"	Stock, Aitken, Waterman	Stock, Aitken, Waterman	—	—	—	Kylie

== 1989 ==
Date	Artist	Title	Written by	Produced by	UK Chart	US Chart	AUS Chart	Album
16 Jan 1989	Samantha Fox	"I Only Wanna Be With You"	Raymonde, Hawker	Stock, Aitken, Waterman	16	31	19	I Wanna Have Some Fun
13 Feb 1989	Bananarama feat. Lananeeneenoonoo	"Help!"	Lennon, McCartney	Stock, Aitken, Waterman	3	—	25	Greatest Hits Collection
13 Feb 1989	Donna Summer	"This Time I Know It's For Real"	Stock, Aitken, Waterman, Summer	Stock, Aitken, Waterman	3	7	40	Another Place and Time
13 Feb 1989	Donna Summer	"Whatever Your Heart Desires"	Stock, Aitken, Waterman, Summer	Stock, Aitken, Waterman	—	—	—	Another Place and Time
20 Feb 1989	Jason Donovan	"Too Many Broken Hearts"	Stock, Aitken, Waterman	Stock, Aitken, Waterman	1	—	7	Ten Good Reasons
20 Feb 1989	Jason Donovan	"Wrap My Arms Around You"	Stock, Aitken, Waterman	Stock, Aitken, Waterman	—	—	—	B-side
25 Feb 1989	The Reynolds Girls	"I'd Rather Jack"	Stock, Aitken, Waterman	Stock, Aitken, Waterman	8	—	43	(non-album)
20 Mar 1989	Donna Summer	"The Only One"	Stock, Aitken, Waterman	Stock, Aitken, Waterman	—	—	—	Another Place and Time
20 Mar 1989	Donna Summer	"In Another Place and Time"	Stock, Aitken, Waterman	Stock, Aitken, Waterman	—	—	—	Another Place and Time
20 Mar 1989	Donna Summer	"Sentimental"	Stock, Aitken, Waterman, Summer	Stock, Aitken, Waterman	—	—	—	Another Place and Time
20 Mar 1989	Donna Summer	"If It Makes You Feel Good"	Stock, Aitken, Waterman	Stock, Aitken, Waterman	—	—	—	Another Place and Time
Mar 1989	Pat and Mick	"I Haven't Stopped Dancing Yet"	Jones	Stock, Aitken, Waterman	9	—	—	(non-album)
Mar 1989	Pat and Mick	"You Better Not Fool Around"	Stock, Aitken, Waterman	Stock, Aitken, Waterman	—	—	—	B-side
24 Apr 1989	Kylie Minogue	"Hand on Your Heart"	Stock, Aitken, Waterman	Stock, Aitken, Waterman	1	—	4	Enjoy Yourself
24 Apr 1989	Kylie Minogue	"Just Wanna Love You"	Stock, Aitken, Waterman	Stock, Aitken, Waterman	—	—	—	B-side
2 May 1989	Jason Donovan	"You Can Depend on Me"	Stock, Aitken, Waterman	Stock, Aitken, Waterman	—	—	—	Ten Good Reasons
2 May 1989	Jason Donovan	"Time Heals"	Stock, Aitken, Waterman	Stock, Aitken, Waterman	—	—	—	Ten Good Reasons
2 May 1989	Jason Donovan	"Question of Pride"	Stock, Aitken, Waterman	Stock, Aitken, Waterman	—	—	—	Ten Good Reasons
2 May 1989	Jason Donovan	"If I Don't Have You"	Stock, Aitken, Waterman	Stock, Aitken, Waterman	—	—	—	Ten Good Reasons
2 May 1989	Jason Donovan	"Change Your Mind"	Stock, Aitken, Waterman	Stock, Aitken, Waterman	—	—	—	Ten Good Reasons
2 May 1989	Jason Donovan	"Too Late to Say Goodbye"	Stock, Aitken, Waterman	Stock, Aitken, Waterman	—	—	—	Ten Good Reasons
8 May 1989	Various Artists	"Ferry Cross the Mersey"	Marsden	Stock, Aitken, Waterman	1	—	45	(non-album)
15 May 1989	Donna Summer	"I Don't Wanna Get Hurt"	Stock, Aitken, Waterman	Stock, Aitken, Waterman	7	—	—	Another Place and Time
29 May 1989	Jason Donovan	"Sealed with a Kiss"	Udell, Geid	Stock, Aitken, Waterman	1	—	8	Ten Good Reasons
29 May 1989	Jason Donovan	"Just Call Me Up"	Stock, Aitken, Waterman	Stock, Aitken, Waterman	—	—	—	B-side
15 Jun 1989	Sonia	"You'll Never Stop Me Loving You"	Stock, Aitken, Waterman	Stock, Aitken, Waterman	1	10	29	Everybody Knows
24 Jul 1989	Kylie Minogue	"Wouldn't Change a Thing"	Stock, Aitken, Waterman	Stock, Aitken, Waterman	2	—	8	Enjoy Yourself
07 Aug 1989	Rick Astley	"Ain't Too Proud to Beg"	Holland, Whitfield	Stock, Aitken, Waterman	—	89	—	Hold Me in Your Arms
12 Aug 1989	Big Fun	"Blame It on the Boogie"	Jackson, Jackson, Krohn	Stock, Aitken, Waterman	4	—	37	A Pocketful of Dreams
14 Aug 1989	Cliff Richard	"I Just Don't Have the Heart"	Stock, Aitken, Waterman	Stock, Aitken, Waterman	3	—	100	Stronger
14 Aug 1989	Donna Summer	"Love's About to Change My Heart"	Stock, Aitken, Waterman	Stock, Aitken, Waterman	20	85	71	Another Place and Time
28 Aug 1989	Jason Donovan	"Every Day (I Love You More)"	Stock, Aitken, Waterman	Stock, Aitken, Waterman	2	—	43	Ten Good Reasons
28 Aug 1989	Jason Donovan	"I Guess She Never Loved Me"	Stock, Aitken, Waterman	Stock, Aitken, Waterman	—	—	—	B-side
25 Sep 1989	Sonia	"Can't Forget You"	Stock, Aitken, Waterman	Stock, Aitken, Waterman	17	—	98	Everybody Knows
09 Oct 1989	Kylie Minogue	"Nothing to Lose"	Stock, Aitken, Waterman	Stock, Aitken, Waterman	—	—	—	Enjoy Yourself
09 Oct 1989	Kylie Minogue	"Tell-Tale Signs"	Stock, Aitken, Waterman	Stock, Aitken, Waterman	—	—	—	Enjoy Yourself
09 Oct 1989	Kylie Minogue	"My Secret Heart"	Stock, Aitken, Waterman	Stock, Aitken, Waterman	—	—	—	Enjoy Yourself
09 Oct 1989	Kylie Minogue	"I'm over Dreaming (Over You)"	Stock, Aitken, Waterman	Stock, Aitken, Waterman	—	—	—	Enjoy Yourself
09 Oct 1989	Kylie Minogue	"Heaven and Earth"	Stock, Aitken, Waterman	Stock, Aitken, Waterman	—	—	—	Enjoy Yourself
09 Oct 1989	Kylie Minogue	"Enjoy Yourself"	Stock, Aitken, Waterman	Stock, Aitken, Waterman	—	—	—	Enjoy Yourself
23 Oct 1989	Kylie Minogue	"Never Too Late"	Stock, Aitken, Waterman	Stock, Aitken, Waterman	4	—	14	Enjoy Yourself
Oct 1989	Donna Summer	"Breakaway"	Stock, Aitken, Waterman	Stock, Aitken, Waterman	49	—	—	Another Place and Time
13 Nov 1989	Donna Summer	"When Love Takes Over You"	Stock, Aitken, Waterman	Stock, Aitken, Waterman	72	—	—	Another Place and Time
27 Nov 1989	Jason Donovan	"When You Come Back to Me"	Stock, Aitken, Waterman	Stock, Aitken, Waterman	2	—	40	Between the Lines
27 Nov 1989	Sonia	"Listen to Your Heart"	Stock, Aitken, Waterman	Stock, Aitken, Waterman	10	—	119	Everybody Knows
27 Nov 1989	Sonia	"Better than Ever"	Stock, Aitken, Waterman	Stock, Aitken, Waterman	—	—	—	B-side
Nov 1989	Big Fun	"Can't Shake the Feeling"	Stock, Aitken, Waterman	Stock, Aitken, Waterman	8	—	97	A Pocketful of Dreams
12 Dec 1989	Band Aid II	"Do They Know It's Christmas?"	Geldof, Ure	Stock, Aitken, Waterman	1	—	30	(non-album)

== 1990 ==
Date	Artist	Title	Written by	Produced by	UK Chart	US Chart	AUS Chart	Album
08 Jan 1990	Kylie Minogue	"Tears on My Pillow"	Bradford, Lewis	Stock, Aitken, Waterman	1	—	20	Enjoy Yourself
08 Jan 1990	Kylie Minogue	"We Know The Meaning Of Love"	Stock, Aitken, Waterman	Stock, Aitken, Waterman	—	—	—	B-side
15 Jan 1990	Lonnie Gordon	"Happenin' All Over Again"	Stock, Aitken, Waterman	Stock, Aitken, Waterman	4	98	33	If I Have to Stand Alone
Feb 1990	Kakko	"We Should Be Dancing"	Stock, Aitken, Waterman	Stock, Aitken, Waterman	101	—	—	(non-album)
08 Mar 1990	Jason Donovan	"Hang On to Your Love"	Stock, Aitken, Waterman	Stock, Aitken, Waterman	8	—	—	Between the Lines
26 Mar 1990	Sonia	"Counting Every Minute"	Stock, Aitken, Waterman	Stock, Aitken, Waterman	16	—	118	Everybody Knows
Mar 1990	Big Fun	"Handful of Promises"	Stock, Aitken, Waterman	Stock, Aitken, Waterman	21	—	110	A Pocketful of Dreams
23 Apr 1990	Sonia	"Everybody Knows"	Stock, Aitken, Waterman	Stock, Aitken, Waterman	—	—	—	Everybody Knows
23 Apr 1990	Sonia	"Can't Help the Way That I Feel"	Stock, Aitken, Waterman	Stock, Aitken, Waterman	—	—	—	Everybody Knows
30 Apr 1990	Kylie Minogue	"Better the Devil You Know"	Stock, Aitken, Waterman	Stock, Aitken, Waterman	2	—	4	Rhythm of Love
Apr 1990	Big Fun	"We're in This Love Forever"	Stock, Aitken, Waterman	Stock, Aitken, Waterman	—	—	—	A Pocketful of Dreams
Apr 1990	Pat and Mick	"Use It Up and Wear It Out"	Brown, Linzer	Stock, Aitken, Waterman	22	81	—	(non-album)
Apr 1990	Pat and Mick	"Star Teaser"	Stock, Aitken, Waterman	Stock, Aitken, Waterman	—	—	—	B-side
29 May 1990	Jason Donovan	"Love Would Find a Way"	Stock, Aitken, Waterman	Stock, Aitken, Waterman	—	—	—	Between the Lines
29 May 1990	Jason Donovan	"Careless Talk and Silly Lies"	Stock, Aitken, Waterman	Stock, Aitken, Waterman	—	—	—	Between the Lines
29 May 1990	Jason Donovan	"When It's All Over"	Stock, Aitken, Waterman	Stock, Aitken, Waterman	—	—	—	Between the Lines
29 May 1990	Jason Donovan	"Like It Was Yesterday"	Stock, Aitken, Waterman	Stock, Aitken, Waterman	—	—	—	Between the Lines
29 May 1990	Jason Donovan	"Hard To Say It's Over"	Stock, Aitken, Waterman	Stock, Aitken, Waterman	—	—	—	Between the Lines
11 Jun 1990	Big Fun & Sonia	"You've Got a Friend"	Stock, Aitken, Waterman	Stock, Aitken, Waterman	14	—	157	(non-album)
18 Jun 1990	Jason Donovan	"Another Night"	Stock, Aitken, Waterman	Stock, Aitken, Waterman	18	—	—	Between the Lines
Jun 1990	Romi & Jazz	"One Love One World"	Stock, Aitken, Waterman	Stock, Aitken, Waterman	98	—	—	(non-album)
Jun 1990	Yell!	"One Thing Leads to Another"	Stock, Aitken, Waterman	Stock, Aitken, Waterman	81	—	—	Let's Go!
13 Aug 1990	Sonia	"The End of the World"	Dee, Kent	Stock, Aitken, Waterman	18	—	153	Everybody Knows
20 Aug 1990	Jason Donovan	"Rhythm of the Rain"	Gunmoe	Stock, Aitken, Waterman	9	—	44	Between the Lines
20 Aug 1990	Jason Donovan	"Story Of My Life"	Stock, Aitken, Waterman	Stock, Aitken, Waterman	—	—	—	B-side
Aug 1990	Big Fun	"Hey There Lonely Girl"	Carr, Schuman	Stock, Aitken, Waterman	62	—	—	A Pocketful of Dreams
Aug 1990	Lonnie Gordon	"Beyond Your Wildest Dreams"	Stock, Aitken, Waterman	Stock, Aitken, Waterman	48	—	104	If I Have To Stand Alone
Sep 1990	Grand Plaz	"Wow Wow - Na Na"	DJ Crazyhouse, De Carlo, Frasheur, Leka	Stock, Aitken, Waterman	41	—	—	(non-album)
15 Oct 1990	Jason Donovan	"I'm Doing Fine"	Stock, Aitken, Waterman	Stock, Aitken, Waterman	22	—	123	Between the Lines
22 Oct 1990	Kylie Minogue	"Step Back in Time"	Stock, Aitken, Waterman	Stock, Aitken, Waterman	4	—	5	Rhythm of Love
Oct 1990	L.A. Mood	"Olé Olé Olé"	Armath, Deja, Stock, Aitken, Waterman	Stock, Aitken, Waterman	78	—	—	(non-album)
05 Nov 1990	Lonnie Gordon	"If I Have to Stand Alone"	Stock, Aitken, Waterman	Stock, Aitken, Waterman	68	—	147	If I Have to Stand Alone
12 Nov 1990	Kylie Minogue	"Secrets"	Stock, Aitken, Waterman	Stock, Aitken, Waterman	—	—	—	Rhythm of Love
12 Nov 1990	Kylie Minogue	"Always Find the Time"	James, Stock, Aitken, Waterman	Stock, Aitken, Waterman	—	—	—	Rhythm of Love
12 Nov 1990	Kylie Minogue	"Things Can Only Get Better"	Stock, Aitken, Waterman	Stock, Aitken, Waterman	—	—	—	Rhythm of Love
26 Nov 1990	Lonnie Gordon	"Better Off Without You"	Stock, Aitken, Waterman	Stock, Aitken, Waterman	—	—	—	If I Have to Stand Alone
26 Nov 1990	Lonnie Gordon	"That's No Reason"	Stock, Aitken, Waterman	Stock, Aitken, Waterman	—	—	—	If I Have to Stand Alone
26 Nov 1990	Lonnie Gordon	"Best of Friends"	Stock, Aitken, Waterman	Stock, Aitken, Waterman	—	—	—	If I Have to Stand Alone
Nov 1990	Sybil	"Make It Easy on Me"	Stock, Aitken, Waterman	Stock, Aitken, Waterman	98	—	160	Sybilization
03 Dec 1990	Delage	"Rock the Boat"	Holmes	Stock, Aitken, Waterman	63	—	—	(non-album)
03 Dec 1990	Delage	"I Wanna Be Your Everything"	Stock, Aitken, Waterman	Stock, Aitken, Waterman	—	—	—	B-side
Dec 1990	Errol Brown	"Send a Prayer (To Heaven)	Stock, Aitken, Waterman	Stock, Aitken, Waterman	83	—	—	(non-album)
Dec 1990	Errol Brown	"Family Christmas Time"	Stock, Aitken, Waterman	Stock, Aitken, Waterman	—	—	—	B-side

== 1991 ==
Date	Artist	Title	Written by	Produced by	UK Chart	US Chart	AUS Chart	Album
21 Jan 1991	Kylie Minogue	"What Do I Have to Do"	Stock, Aitken, Waterman	Stock, Aitken, Waterman	6	—	11	Rhythm of Love
09 Feb 1991	Paul Varney	"If Only I Knew"	Stock, Aitken, Waterman	Stock, Aitken, Waterman	—	—	—	(non-album)
11 Mar 1991	Hazell Dean	"Better Off Without You"	Stock, Aitken, Waterman	Stock, Aitken, Waterman	72	—	—	(non-album)
Mar 1991	Pat and Mick	"Gimme Some"	Casey, Finch	Stock, Aitken, Waterman	53	—	—	(non-album)
Mar 1991	Pat and Mick	"Arcadia"	Stock, Aitken, Waterman	Stock, Aitken, Waterman	—	—	—	B-side
7 May 1991	Jason Donovan	"R.S.V.P"	Stock, Aitken, Waterman	Stock, Aitken, Waterman	17	—	91	Greatest Hits
7 May 1991	Jason Donovan	"When I Get You Alone"	Stock, Aitken, Waterman	Stock, Aitken, Waterman	—	—	—	B-side
13 May 1991	Bananarama	"Ain't No Cure"	Dallin, Stock, Aitken, Waterman	Stock, Aitken, Waterman	—	—	—	Pop Life
13 May 1991	Bananarama	"Heartless"	Dallin, Woodward, Stock, Aitken, Waterman	Stock, Aitken, Waterman	—	—	—	Pop Life
20 May 1991	Kylie Minogue	"Shocked"	Stock, Aitken, Waterman	Stock, Aitken, Waterman	6	—	7	Rhythm of Love
3 Jun 1991	Delage	"Running Back For More"	Stock, Aitken, Waterman	Stock, Aitken, Waterman	155	—	—	
3 Jun 1991	Delage	"I Wanna Shout About It"	Stock, Aitken, Waterman	Stock, Aitken, Waterman	—	—	—	
3 Jun 1991	Stock Aitken Waterman feat. Einstein	"Roadblock (Loopline Like Remix)"	Stock, Aitken, Waterman	Stock, Aitken, Waterman	100	—	—	
17 Jun 1991	The Twins	"All Mixed Up"	Stock, Aitken, Waterman	Stock, Aitken, Waterman	77	—	74	(non-album)
17 Jun 1991	Pat and Mick	"The Concrete Megamix"	Jones, Zager, Fields, Brown, Linzer, Kean Canter, Mattowski, Armath, Deja	Stock, Aitken, Waterman	90	—	—	
17 Jun 1991	Pat and Mick	"This is Only a Dream"	Stock, Waterman	Stock, Aitken, Waterman	—	—	—	B-side
15 Jul 1991	Boy Krazy	"That's What Love Can Do"	Stock, Aitken, Waterman	Stock, Aitken, Waterman	86	18	124	Boy Krazy
15 Jul 1991	Boy Krazy	"One Thing Leads to Another"	Stock, Aitken, Waterman	Stock, Aitken, Waterman	—	—	—	Boy Krazy
12 Aug 1991	Jason Donovan	"Happy Together"	Bonner, Gordon	Stock, Waterman	10	—	—	Greatest Hits
12 Aug 1991	Jason Donovan	"She's in Love With You"	Stock, Aitken, Waterman	Stock, Aitken, Waterman	—	—	—	B-side
26 Aug 1991	Kylie Minogue	"Word Is Out"	Stock, Waterman	Stock, Waterman	16	—	10	Let's Get to It
26 Aug 1991	Kylie Minogue	"Say The Word (I'll Be There)"	Minogue, Stock, Waterman	Stock, Waterman	—	—	—	B-side
16 Sep 1991	Jason Donovan	"A Fool Such as I"	Trader	Stock, Aitken, Waterman	—	—	—	Greatest Hits
23 Sep 1991	The Cool Notes	"Make This a Special Night"	Stock, Waterman	Stock, Waterman	86	—	—	(non-album)
23 Sep 1991	The Cool Notes	"Where Do We Go From Here"	Stock, Waterman	Stock, Waterman	—	—	—	B-side
14 Oct 1991	Kylie Minogue	"Too Much of a Good Thing"	Minogue, Stock, Waterman	Stock, Waterman	—	—	—	Let's Get to It
14 Oct 1991	Kylie Minogue	"Let's Get to It"	Stock, Waterman	Stock, Waterman	—	—	—	Let's Get to It
14 Oct 1991	Kylie Minogue	"Right Here, Right Now"	Minogue, Stock, Waterman	Stock, Waterman	—	—	—	Let's Get to It
14 Oct 1991	Kylie Minogue	"Live and Learn"	Minogue, Stock, Waterman	Stock, Waterman	—	—	—	Let's Get to It
14 Oct 1991	Kylie Minogue	"I Guess I Like It Like That"	De Coster, Minogue, Wilde, Stock, Waterman	Stock, Waterman	—	—	—	Let's Get to It
14 Oct 1991	Kylie Minogue	"No World Without You"	Minogue, Stock, Waterman	Stock, Waterman	—	—	—	Let's Get to It
21 Oct 1991	Kylie Minogue & Keith Washington	"If You Were with Me Now"	Minogue, Stock, Waterman, Washington	Stock, Waterman	4	—	23	Let's Get to It
28 Oct 1991	Paul Varney	"So Proud of You"	Stock, Aitken, Waterman	Stock, Waterman	105	—	—	(non-album)
11 Nov 1991	Visionmasters feat. Kylie Minogue	"Keep on Pumpin' It"	Minogue, Stock, Waterman	Stock, Waterman	49	—	—	(non-album)
09 Dec 1991	Malcolm McLaren feat. Alison Limerick	"Magic's Back"	McLaren, Stock, Waterman	McLaren, Stock, Waterman	42	—	—	(non-album)

== 1992 ==
Date	Artist	Title	Written by	Produced by	UK Chart	US Chart	AUS Chart	Album
13 Jan 1992	Kylie Minogue	"Give Me Just a Little More Time"	Dunbar, Wayne	Stock, Waterman	2	—	4	Let's Get to It
13 Jan 1992	Kylie Minogue	"Do You Dare?"	Minogue, Stock, Waterman	Stock, Waterman	—	—	—	B-side
20 Jan 1992	Boy Krazy	"All You Have To Do"	Stock, Waterman	Stock, Waterman	91	—	—	Boy Krazy
13 Apr 1992	Pat and Mick	"Shake Your Groove Thing"	Fekaris, Perren	Stock, Waterman	80	—	—	(non-album)
13 Apr 1992	Pat and Mick	"Eggstravaganza"	Stock, Waterman	Stock, Waterman	—	—	—	B-side
13 Apr 1992	Kylie Minogue	"Finer Feelings"	Stock, Waterman	Stock, Waterman	11	—	60	Let's Get to It
13 Apr 1992	Kylie Minogue	"Closer"	Minogue, Stock, Waterman	Stock, Waterman	—	—	—	B-side
18 May 1992	Nancy Davis	"If You Belonged to Me"	Stock, Waterman	Stock, Waterman	89	—	—	(non-album)
10 Aug 1992	Kylie Minogue	"What Kind of Fool (Heard All That Before)"	Minogue, Stock, Waterman	Stock, Waterman	14	—	17	Greatest Hits
24 Aug 1992	Kylie Minogue	"Where in the World?"	Minogue, Stock, Waterman	Stock, Waterman	—	—	—	Greatest Hits
17 Aug 1992	Bananarama	"Movin' On"	Dallin, Woodward, Stock, Waterman	Stock, Waterman	24	—	177	Please Yourself
17 Aug 1992	Bananarama	"Treat Me Right"	Dallin, Woodward, Stock, Waterman	Stock, Waterman	—	—	—	B-side
24 Aug 1992	The Fat Slags	"Summer Holiday"	Bennett, Welch	Stock, Waterman	78	—	—	(non-album)
24 Aug 1992	The Fat Slags	"Dance Of The Handbags (Oh Lordy It's The Fat Slags!)"	Stock, Waterman	Stock, Waterman	—	—	—	B-side
21 Sep 1992	Nancy Davis	"Higher & Higher"	Davis, Jackson, Miner, Smith	Stock, Waterman	95	—	—	(non-album)
21 Sep 1992	Nancy Davis	"Never Knew Love Like This Before"	Stock, Waterman	Stock, Waterman	—	—	—	B-side
28 Nov 1992	Bananarama	"Last Thing on My Mind"	Dallin, Woodward, Stock, Waterman	Stock, Waterman	71	—	—	Please Yourself
28 Nov 1992	Bananarama	"Another Lover"	Dallin, Woodward, Stock, Waterman	Stock, Waterman	—	—	—	B-side
Nov 1992	Fresh	"Did I Say "Ti Amo"?"	Stock, Waterman	Stock, Waterman	98	—	—	(non-album)
12 Dec 1992	WWF Superstars	"Slam Jam"	Stock, Waterman, WWF	Stock, Waterman	4	—	—	WrestleMania: The Album

== 1993 ==
Date	Artist	Title	Written by	Produced by	UK Chart	US Chart	AUS Chart	Album
04 Jan 1993	West End feat. Sybil	"The Love I Lost"	Gamble, Huff	Stock, Waterman	3	90	145	Good 'N' Ready
04 Jan 1993	West End feat. Sybil	"Sybil-it"	Stock, Waterman	Stock, Waterman	—	—	—	B-side
23 Feb 1993	Boy Krazy	"That Kinda Love"	Stock, Aitken, Waterman	Stock, Waterman	—	—	—	Boy Krazy
23 Feb 1993	Boy Krazy	"On A Wing and a Prayer"	Stock, Waterman	Stock, Waterman	—	—	—	Boy Krazy
23 Feb 1993	Boy Krazy	"Different Class"	Stock, Aitken, Waterman	Stock, Waterman	—	—	—	Boy Krazy
23 Feb 1993	Boy Krazy	"Just Like a Dream Come True"	Stock, Waterman	Stock, Waterman	—	—	—	Boy Krazy
23 Feb 1993	Boy Krazy	"Love is a Freaky Thing"	Stock, Aitken, Waterman	Stock, Waterman	—	—	—	Boy Krazy
23 Feb 1993	Boy Krazy	"Who Could Ask for Anything More?"	Stock, Waterman	Stock, Waterman	—	—	—	Boy Krazy
08 Mar 1993	Bananarama	"More, More, More"	Diamond, Dallin, Woodward, Stock, Waterman	Stock, Waterman	24	—	—	Please Yourself
08 Mar 1993	Bananarama	"Give It All Up For Love"	Dallin, Woodward, Stock, Waterman	Stock, Waterman	—	—	—	Please Yourself
08 Mar 1993	Sybil	"When I'm Good and Ready"	Stock, Waterman	Stock, Waterman	5	—	213	Good 'N' Ready
29 Mar 1993	Key West feat. Erik	"Looks Like I'm in Love Again"	Hewson	Stock, Waterman	46	—	184	Real
16 Apr 1993	Bananarama	"Let Me Love You One More Time"	Dallin, Woodward, Stock, Waterman	Stock, Waterman	—	—	—	Please Yourself
16 Apr 1993	Bananarama	"Is She Good to You?"	Dallin, Woodward, Stock, Waterman	Stock, Waterman	—	—	—	Please Yourself
16 Apr 1993	Bananarama	"Only Time Will Tell"	Dallin, Woodward, Stock, Waterman	Stock, Waterman	—	—	—	Please Yourself
16 Apr 1993	Bananarama	"You'll Never Know What It Means"	Dallin, Woodward, Stock, Waterman	Stock, Waterman	—	—	—	Please Yourself
16 Apr 1993	Bananarama	"You're Never Satisfied"	Dallin, Woodward, Stock, Waterman	Stock, Waterman	—	—	—	Please Yourself
16 Apr 1993	Bananarama	"I Could Be Persuaded"	Dallin, Woodward, Stock, Waterman	Stock, Waterman	—	—	—	Please Yourself
Apr 1993	Bill Tarmey	"One Voice"	Manilow	Stock, Waterman	18	—	—	(non-album)
Apr 1993	Bill Tarmey	"Make This a Special Night"	Stock, Waterman	Stock, Waterman	—	—	—	B-side
Apr 1993	WWF Superstars	"Wrestlemania"	Stock, Waterman, WWF	Stock, Waterman	14	—	—	WrestleMania: The Album
Apr 1993	WWF Superstars	"Never Been a Right Time to Say Goodbye"	Stock, Waterman, WWF	Stock, Waterman	—	—	—	WrestleMania: The Album
31 May 1993	Sybil	"Didn't See the Signs"	Stock, Waterman	Stock, Waterman	—	—	—	Good 'N' Ready
May 1993	Boy Krazy	"Good Times With Bad Boys"	Stock, Aitken, Waterman	Stock, Aitken, Waterman	—	59	—	Boy Krazy
May 1993	Pat & Mick	"Hot Hot Hot"	Cassell	Stock, Waterman	47	—	—	(non-album)
Jun 1993	Sybil	"Beyond Your Wildest Dreams"	Stock, Aitken, Waterman	Stock, Waterman	41	—	—	Good 'N' Ready
Jul 1993	Slamm	"Energize"	Stock, Waterman	Stock, Waterman	57	—	—	(non-album)
09 Aug 1993	Suzette Charles	"Free to Love Again"	Stock, Waterman	Stock, Waterman	58	—	—	(non-album)
31 Aug 1993	Sybil	"Stronger Together"	Stock, Waterman	Stock, Waterman	41	—	—	Good 'N' Ready
Oct 1993	Erik	"The Devil and the Deep Blue Sea"	Stock, Waterman	Stock, Waterman	—	—	—	Real
Oct 1993	Slamm	"Virginia Plain"	Ferry	Stock, Waterman	60	—	—	(non-album)

== 1994 ==
Date	Artist	Title	Written by	Produced by	UK Chart	US Chart	AUS Chart	Album
25 Apr 1994	Worlds Apart	"Same Old Promises"	Stock, Waterman	Stock, Waterman	—	—	—	Together
25 Apr 1994	Worlds Apart	"Experienced"	Stock, Waterman	Stock, Waterman	—	—	—	Together

== 2007 ==
Date	Artist	Title	Written by	Produced by	UK Chart	US Chart	AUS Chart	Album
17 Sep 2007	The Sheilas	"(I'm So) Happy Happy (You're Mine)"	Stock, Waterman	Stock, Waterman	91	—	—	(non-album)

== 2010 ==
Date	Artist	Title	Written by	Produced by	UK Chart	US Chart	AUS Chart	Album
24 May 2010	Josh Dubovie	"That Sounds Good to Me"	Crosby, Stock, Waterman	Stock, Waterman	179	—	—	(non-album)

== 2015 ==
Date	Artist	Title	Written by	Produced by	UK Chart	US Chart	AUS Chart	Album
02 Dec 2015	Kylie Minogue	"Every Day's Like Christmas (A Stock Aitken Waterman Remix)"	Eriksen, Hermansen, Martin	Anderson, Stock, Aitken, Waterman	—	—	—	Kylie Christmas

== Legacy releases ==
=== 1995 ===
Date	Artist	Title	Written by	Produced by	UK Chart	US Chart	AUS Chart	Album
1995	Barrio Boyzz	"Experienced" (Note: Recorded and produced in 1993)	Stock, Waterman	Stock, Waterman	—	—	—	Unpolished Diamonds - from the SAW Catalogue
1995	Suzette Charles	"Don't Stop (All the Love You Can Give)"	Stock, Waterman	Stock, Waterman	—	—	—	Unpolished Diamonds - from the SAW Catalogue
1995	Suzette Charles	"Just For a Minute"	Stock, Waterman	Stock, Waterman	—	—	—	Unpolished Diamonds - from the SAW Catalogue
1995	Suzette Charles	"What the Eye Don't See"	Stock, Waterman	Stock, Waterman	—	—	—	Unpolished Diamonds - from the SAW Catalogue
1995	Lonnie Gordon	"How Could He Do This to Me?" (Note: Recorded and produced in 1990)	Stock, Aitken, Waterman	Stock, Aitken, Waterman	—	—	—	Gay Anthems Vol. 2

=== 1997 ===
Date	Artist	Title	Written by	Produced by	UK Chart	US Chart	AUS Chart	Album
13 Oct 1997	Delage	"Ain't No Cure" (Note: Recorded and produced in 1991)	Dallin, Stock, Aitken, Waterman	Stock, Aitken, Waterman	—	—	—	12 Inch Classics Vol. 3

=== 2003 ===
Date	Artist	Title	Written by	Produced by	UK Chart	US Chart	AUS Chart	Album
2003	Kahal & Kahal	"Show Me No Mercy" (Note: Recorded and produced in 1992)	Kahal, Kahal, Stock, Waterman	Stock, Waterman	—	—	—	Show Me No Mercy

=== 2005 ===
Date	Artist	Title	Written by	Produced by	UK Chart	US Chart	AUS Chart	Album
07 Nov 2005	Mandy Smith	"Got to Be Certain" (Note: Recorded and produced in 1987)	Stock, Aitken, Waterman	Stock, Aitken, Waterman	—	—	—	Stock Aitken Waterman Gold

=== 2009 ===
Date	Artist	Title	Written by	Produced by	UK Chart	US Chart	AUS Chart	Album
13 Apr 2009	Mandy Smith	"Terry"	Ripley	Stock, Aitken, Waterman	—	—	—	Mandy Special Edition
Jun 2009	Hazell Dean	"Can't Help The Way That I Feel" (Note: Recorded and produced in 1989)	Stock, Aitken, Waterman	Stock, Aitken, Waterman	—	—	—	(non-album)
Jun 2009	Stock Aitken Waterman feat. Lisa Fabien	"Better Than Ever" (Note: Recorded and produced in 1988)	Stock, Aitken, Waterman	Stock, Aitken, Waterman	—	—	—	(non-album)
27 Jul 2009	Paul Lekakis	"Fruit Machine"	Stock, Aitken, Waterman	Stock, Aitken, Waterman	—	—	—	(non-album)
Aug 2009	Boy Krazy	"Don't Wanna Let You Go"	Stock, Waterman	Stock, Waterman	—	—	—	(non-album)
Aug 2009	Boy Krazy	"Exception to the Rule"	Stock, Aitken, Waterman	Stock, Waterman	—	—	—	Boy Krazy Special Edition
Aug 2009	Boy Krazy	"I'll Never Get Another Chance Like This"	Stock, Aitken, Waterman	Stock, Waterman	—	—	—	Boy Krazy Special Edition
Sep 2009	The Cool Notes	"Love Is a Freaky Thing"	Stock, Waterman	Stock, Waterman	—	—	—	(non-album)
18 Oct 2009	Sinitta	"How Can This Be Real Love"	Stock, Aitken, Waterman	Stock, Aitken, Waterman	—	—	—	Right Back Where We Started From: The Hits Collection (86-09)
18 Oct 2009	Sinitta	"Do You Wanna Find Out"	Stock, Aitken, Waterman	Stock, Aitken, Waterman	—	—	—	Right Back Where We Started From: The Hits Collection (86-09)
Nov 2009	Stock Aitken Waterman	"The Christmas Medley"	Various	Stock, Aitken, Waterman	—	—	—	(non-album)
14 Dec 2009	Samantha Fox	"Too Late to Say Goodbye"	Stock, Aitken, Waterman	Stock, Aitken, Waterman	—	—	—	Greatest Hits

=== 2010 ===
Date	Artist	Title	Written by	Produced by	UK Chart	US Chart	AUS Chart	Album
19 Apr 2010	Big Fun & Sonia	"You've Got a Friend"	King	Stock, Aitken, Waterman	—	—	—	A Pocketful of Dreams Special Edition
20 Sep 2010	Sonia	"Let's Have a Party"	Robinson	Stock, Aitken, Waterman	—	—	—	Everybody Knows Special Edition

=== 2011 ===
Date	Artist	Title	Written by	Produced by	UK Chart	US Chart	AUS Chart	Album
25 Apr 2011	Pepsi & Shirlie	"Who's Gonna Catch You (When You Fall)"	Stock, Aitken, Waterman, Wonder, Wright	Stock, Aitken, Waterman	—	—	—	All Right Now Special Edition

=== 2012 ===
Date	Artist	Title	Written by	Produced by	UK Chart	US Chart	AUS Chart	Album
25 Jun 2012	Samantha Fox	"That's What Love Can Do" (Note: Vocals recorded in 1991, produced in 2012)	Stock, Aitken, Waterman	Pop, Stock, Aitken, Waterman	—	—	—	Just One Night Special Edition
25 Jun 2012	Samantha Fox	"A Second Chance"	Stock, Aitken, Waterman	Pop, Stock, Aitken, Waterman	—	—	—	Just One Night Special Edition
25 Jun 2012	Samantha Fox	"Forever True"	Stock, Aitken, Waterman	Stock, Aitken, Waterman	—	—	—	Just One Night Special Edition
10 Sep 2012	Hazell Dean	"Keeping It Together" (Note: Recorded and produced in 1985)	Stock, Aitken, Waterman	Stock, Aitken, Waterman	—	—	—	Evergreen: The Very Best Of
10 Sep 2012	Hazell Dean	"Call and Say"	Stock, Aitken, Waterman	Stock, Aitken, Waterman	—	—	—	Evergreen: The Very Best Of

=== 2013 ===
Date	Artist	Title	Written by	Produced by	UK Chart	US Chart	AUS Chart	Album
28 Oct 2013	Bananarama	"Reason For Living"	Stock, Aitken, Waterman	Stock, Aitken, Waterman	—	—	—	Wow! Special Edition
28 Oct 2013	Bananarama	"I Don't Care"	Dallin, Woodward, Stock, Aitken, Waterman	Stock, Aitken, Waterman	—	—	—	Pop Life Special Edition

=== 2016 ===
Date	Artist	Title	Written by	Produced by	UK Chart	US Chart	AUS Chart	Album
21 Dec 2016	The Cool Notes	"Turns Me Off"	Stock, Waterman	Stock, Waterman	—	—	—	The PWL Dayz
21 Dec 2016	The Cool Notes	"Sweetness and Light"	Stock, Waterman	Stock, Waterman	—	—	—	The PWL Dayz

=== 2025 ===
Date	Artist	Title	Written by	Produced by	UK Chart	US Chart	AUS Chart	Album
28 Nov 2025	Brilliant	"Hold Each Other Tight" (Note: Recorded and produced in 1986)	Cauty, Glover, Montana, Stock, Aitken, Waterman	Stock, Aitken, Waterman	—	—	—	Kiss The Lips Of Life - Deluxe Edition
