= Ferry Aid =

British-American ensemble band (1987)

Ferry Aid was a British-American charity supergroup, brought together to record the song "Let It Be" in 1987. The single was released following the Zeebrugge Disaster; on 6 March 1987 the ferry Herald of Free Enterprise had capsized, killing 193 passengers and crew. All proceeds from sales of the single were donated to the charity set up in the aftermath of the disaster. The recording was organised by The Sun newspaper, after it had sold cheap tickets for the ferry on that day. "Let It Be" was written by Paul McCartney and originally recorded by the Beatles in 1969.

== Recording ==
Garry Bushell, then with The Sun newspaper, organised the recording of "Let It Be" by recruiting record producers Stock, Aitken and Waterman. They then put an invitation out to the music industry for artists to contribute their vocals to the song. Although many stars were initially reluctant to join forces with the newspaper, eventually artists such as Boy George, Kate Bush, Gary Moore and Mark Knopfler agreed to take part. Original writer Paul McCartney also contributed to the song, although his performance (and section in the accompanying video) was recorded independently in his own studios. It was later revealed that McCartney used his voice of the original recording of the 1970 Beatles track and added it to the Ferry Aid recording. The song was recorded over three days between 14 and 16 March 1987 and the single was released on 23 March 1987. The first artist to record his part was Mark King (who also played bass guitar on the song) on the Saturday morning, while the last was Paul King on Monday evening.

In the original Beatles recording, George Harrison did the guitar solo; but for the purposes of this song—as shown in the video—the solo was divided with Gary Moore first, then Mark Knopfler, then back to Gary Moore, with Moore's parts being more 'rock' and Knopfler's being more laid-back.

== Performers ==
The following artists performed solo spots on the song:

- Paul McCartney
- Boy George
- Keren Woodward and Nick Kamen
- Paul King
- Mark King
- Jaki Graham
- Taffy
- Mark Knopfler (guitar solo)
- Andy Bell
- Pepsi & Shirlie
- Mel and Kim
- Gary Moore (guitar solo)
- Kim Wilde and Nik Kershaw
- Edwin Starr
- Ben Volpeliere-Pierrot
- Ruby Turner
- Kate Bush

The closing chorus was sung by an ensemble choir involving many of the soloists as well as other recording artists and celebrities from other fields. The chorus consisted of:

- The Alarm, John Altman, Debee Ashby, Al Ashton, Rick Astley, Bananarama, Simon Bates, Alison Bettles, Jenny Blythe, Errol Brown, Miquel Brown, Bucks Fizz, Jay Carly, the Christians, Nick Conway, Linda Davidson, Hazell Dean, Anne Diamond, Difford and Tilbrook, Doctor and the Medics, the Drifters, Drum Theatre, Frankie Goes to Hollywood, Roy Gayle, Go West, Carol Hitchcock, Felix Howard, Gloria Hunniford, Imagination, Jenny Jay, Ellie Laine, Annabel Lamb, Stephanie Lawrence, Loose Ends, Linda Lusardi, Ruth Madoc, Bobby McVey, Suzanne Mizzi, the New Seekers, Sadie Nine, the Nolans, Hazel O'Connor, Mike Osman, Su Pollard, Tim Polley, Pamela Power, Maxi Priest, Princess, Jimmy Pursey, Suzi Quatro, Mike Read, Sally Sagoe, Nejdet Salih, Ray Shell, Mandy Smith, Neville Staple, Alvin Stardust, Steve Strange, Sylvia Tella, Terraplane, Bonnie Tyler, Maria Whittaker, Working Week.

The B-side of the 7" single is a gospel version of "Let It Be", made up on the spot by improvising. The 12" single mixed by Burni Adams and Jamie Bromfield has "Let It Be (Mega Message Mix)" on the B-side.

== Criticism ==
The British pop band Chumbawamba anonymously released a parody of the song, "Scab Aid", a criticism of The Sun newspaper and the motives of the contributing performers which they regarded as hypocritical.

Musician Robb Johnson (who later recorded with Chumbawamba) referenced Ferry Aid in his song "The Herald of Free Enterprise", criticising it for similar reasons.

== Chart performance ==
"Let It Be" reached number one in the UK Singles Chart in its first week on 4 April 1987, and remained at that position for three weeks. It was the 13th best selling single of the year in the UK; it was certified gold for shipping over 500,000 copies. The single was also a number one hit in Norway and Switzerland, and reached the top 10 in several other European countries.

Chart (1987)	Peak position
Australian (Kent Music Report) Chart	28
Austrian Singles Chart	4
Denmark (IFPI)	1
Dutch GfK chart	4
Dutch Top 40	3
French Singles Chart	8
Irish Singles Chart	2
Norwegian Singles Chart	1
Swedish Singles Chart	9
Swiss Singles Chart	1
UK Singles Chart	1
