= The Cool Notes =

1980s pop/funk group

- Origin: London, England
- Genres: Pop, soul, funk
- Years active: 1979–1993; 2020–2022
- Labels: Cool Note Records, Abstract Dance, Risin Records, Injection Disco Dance Label, Swanyard Records Ltd, Intercord Tonträger GmbH
- Past members: Peter Rowlands; J.C. Ian Dustan; Lauraine Smart; Heather Austin; Peter Lee Gordon; Steve McIntosh; Mel Glynn

The Cool Notes were a British pop-funk group who had a string of chart hits in the UK between 1984 and 1986. The band, which formed in South London, consisted of seven members of both vocal and instrumental talent. They are best known for their UK number 11 hit, "Spend the Night".

== Discography ==
=== Studio albums ===
Year	Album	UK
1981	Down to Earth	—
1985	Have a Good Forever	66
"—" denotes releases that did not chart.

=== Compilation albums ===
- Best of the Cool Notes (1990)
- The Unreleased Demos (2012)
- The PWL Dayz (2016)

=== Singles ===
Year	Song	UK
1981	"Meant to Be"	—
1982	"People Make the World Go Round"	—
1982	"Morning Child"	—
1984	"I Wanna Dance / Blown It"	—
1984	"You're Never Too Young"	42
1984	"I Forgot"	63
1985	"Spend the Night"	11
1985	"In Your Car"	13
1985	"Have a Good Forever"	73
1986	"Into the Motion"	66
1986	"Momentary Vision"	94
1988	"Magic Lover"	169
1990	"Spend the Night" (remix)	84
1991	"Make This a Special Night"	86
"—" denotes releases that did not chart.
