= Neck creaking =

- Causes: Normal, or due to arthrosis

Neck creaking or cracking of the neck is a clicking sound caused by movements of the neck. It can be the result of joint cracking or caused by arthrosis.
