= Carol Hitchcock =

Australian singer and actress (born 1959)

- Born: Carol Ann Hitchcock; 10 December 1959 (age 66); Melbourne, Victoria, Australia
- Origin: Melbourne, Victoria, Australia
- Genre: Pop
- Occupations: Singer, actress
- Instrument: Vocals
- Years active: 1985–1990

Carol Hitchcock is an Australian singer and actress. She had a top 20 hit on the Kent Music Report Singles Chart with her cover version of "Get Ready" in mid-1987. It also peaked in the top 60 in the United Kingdom and top 50 in New Zealand. In 1985 Hitchcock had acted in the TV series, Prisoner.

== Biography ==
A talented performer, Carol Hitchcock's stand-out style was her shaved head. It was at age 14 Hitchcock first cut her hair short, "a crew-cut. Then I dyed it a million, thousand colours and did anything and everything you could do to your hair. Then I shaved it off. Actually, that was for a modelling job. Being hairless is comfortable. It's no big deal." In August 1987 Hitchcock reflected, "I would not have called myself a career model; it'd been more a case of having work offered to me." She was also a part-time bouncer for various Melbourne nightclubs, the Club and Inflation. In the 1980s she acted in TV programs, including an appearance in Prisoner in 1985.

Hitchcock began her music career as a vocalist for Melbourne-based funk band, Bang. Six months later she transferred to another funk group, Cat People. She signed with Mushroom Records in Australia in the mid-1980s. At that time her appearance included a bald head, nose ring and ear piercings. Early in 1987 she was flown to London at the behest of Mushroom Records' Gary Ashley, where she recorded a cover version of the Temptations' 1969 track, "Get Ready", with United Kingdom producers, Stock Aitken Waterman. The trio had recommended the track for her and she recalls "they were so wonderful to work with." Hitchcock also recorded an original Stock Aitken Waterman song, "More Than Words Can Say", which was released as the B-side to "Get Ready", shortly after Mel and Kim's version was included on their debut album "F.L.M.".

PWL Records Managing Director David Howells recalled of her performance, "She was great, lots of fun, completely committed, got on with it... [but] sadly nothing much happened." Producer Mike Stock praised Hitchcock's vocal performance, but complained the singer upset him "greatly" with her habit of loudly popping her neck in the studio.

Michael Wellham of The Canberra Times observed that "Get Ready" was a "Giant dance floor stomper to sing along with, that threatens dire things if you don't get your disco act together. Your little heart will be danced away to a pop tune as polished as the head that sings it. Just what every party needs." "Get Ready" peaked at No. 18 in Australia, No. 56 in the UK, and No. 47 in New Zealand.

Hitchcock was also part of the backing chorus on a charity record by Ferry Aid to raise funds for the Zeebrugge Ferry Disaster, which covered the Beatles' song "Let It Be" (March 1987). The recording featured Paul McCartney, Pepsi & Shirlie, Princess, Mel & Kim, Kate Bush and Bananarama. The final episode of Countdown aired on 19 July; the compère, Molly Meldrum, interviewed Hitchcock. Her music video for "Get Ready" was also broadcast. In August of that year Hitchcock anticipated working on her second single with Stock Aitken Waterman, saying, "I'll just wait to see what happens after this next single. They seem to like me, they've said I'm easy to get along with, and there is talk about an album."

In March 1988 Wellham contrasted Hitchcock's music video for her single with Kylie Minogue's "I Should Be So Lucky" (December 1987) – both are produced by the UK trio – and found "one of their relatively memorable singles was [Hitchcock]'s 'Get Ready'. Her gimmick for that single was her shaven head. The reason that single was memorable was the threatening tone of [her] vocal. On this single, all Kylie has to offer is sweetness. Bad for the teeth, as it grates."

Speaking of the lack of follow-up single, Howells suggested that outcome was due to a lack of will from her Australian record company: "That was a Mushroom call, we just made the track."

According to Australian musicologist Ian McFarlane, "The gutsy singer had made her mark but, unfortunately, there was no follow-up and Hitchcock slipped from view." During the mid-1980s Hitchcock was married to fellow Australian singer, Roger Hart (ex-Little Heroes).

== Discography ==
=== Singles ===
Year	Title	Peak chart positions		
Year	Title	AUS	NZ	UK
1987	"Get Ready"	18	47	56
