= The Reynolds Girls =

British dance-pop duo

- The Reynolds Girls in the music video for their first and only hit single, "I'd Rather Jack" (1989)

Background information
- Origin: Liverpool, United Kingdom
- Genre: Dance-pop
- Years active: 1989
- Label: PWL
- Past members: Aisling Reynolds; Linda Reynolds

The Reynolds Girls were a British dance-pop duo composed of sisters Linda (born in 1970) and Aisling Reynolds (born in 1972). They are best known for their hit single "I'd Rather Jack", produced by Stock Aitken Waterman, which achieved success across Europe in 1989.

== Early life ==
The sisters grew up in Litherland, a suburb of Sefton, Liverpool, and were of Irish descent. The duo's younger sister, Debbie, played the original Katie Rogers, in Brookside, from 1987 to 1989.

== 1989: the single produced by SAW ==
=== Background and lyrics ===
"... AM/FM, all that jazz, we'd rather sing along with Yazz, what happened to the radio, they never play the songs we know .... No heavy metal rock and roll, music from the past, I'd rather jack, than Fleetwood Mac, I'd rather jack ...".

The sisters signed to the PWL record label after giving Pete Waterman a demo tape, and their single "I'd Rather Jack" was produced by Stock Aitken Waterman. The song started out as a response to music critics who ignored the younger pop acts in the UK at the time, and to radio DJs who continued to play older bands on their playlists rather than Stock Aitken Waterman songs. It was also a response to a perceived snub at the Brit Awards, where SAW acts lost out to more "mature" acts such as Enya and Steve Winwood.

=== Chart performance ===
"I'd Rather Jack" reached the top ten in all the European countries it was released. It peaked at number 8 on the UK Singles Chart in April 1989 where it remained for 12 weeks, number 6 in Ireland, number 6 in Finland, number 8 in the Netherlands, number 7 in the Flanders region of Belgium, and number 43 in Australia. The single also reached a peak of number 24 on the Eurochart Hot 100.

=== Impact and legacy ===
In a public poll conducted by Channel 4 in 2003, "I'd Rather Jack" was voted number 91 in a list of the 100 Worst Pop Records of All Time, and has been called "the beginning of the end for Stock Aitken Waterman." In 2014, Matt Dunn of WhatCulture ranked the song at number 15 in his "15 unforgettable Stock Aitken Waterman singles" list, adding: "What a load of silly old dross this was!... Its wispy little arrangement cashed in on the Chicago house sound of the time". In 2021, British magazine Classic Pop ranked the song number 38 in their list of 'Top 40 Stock Aitken Waterman songs', presented the song a "pure-pop apes Chicago house in a track squarely aimed at the teen market. [...] A bubbling, squelchy momentum carries the tune skywards as the two jettison music's old guard". In 2023, Alexis Petridis of The Guardian listed the song" at number 20 in his "Stock Aitken Waterman's 20 greatest songs – ranked!", adding: "Not a great record, but as a mad act of provocation designed to upset as many people as possible in three minutes, "I'd Rather Jack"... is unbeatable."

== After the success ==
After their brief success in 1989 with "I'd Rather Jack", The Reynolds Girls had a public falling out with Pete Waterman, who accused them of being difficult. They parted ways with PWL, saying they wanted to direct their own careers. The girls self-released a second single, "Get Real".

The duo have not made any real media appearance since. In a documentary about PWL that aired in 2012, the people interviewed admitted that the single was indeed a tongue-in-cheek response to the critics, and in part did ruin the siblings' career after they'd recorded it. It is unknown what happened to them after that and they could not be traced for a 2012 PWL reunion concert.

In the 1990's, Linda Reynolds sang in the band "Hype", which made recordings and videos. The song "What You Wanna Do To Me?" was played in UK clubs.

In 2013, ITV started a search for the sisters, so they could appear in a commemorative documentary about Stock, Aitken and Waterman. As of 2026, their whereabouts remain unknown.

== Discography ==
=== Singles ===
List of singles, with selected chart positions
Title	Year	Peak chart positions						
Title	Year	UK	AUS	BEL (FL)	FIN	IRE	NLD	LUX
"I'd Rather Jack"	1989	8	43	7	6	6	8	6
"Get Real"	1989	—	—	—	—	—	—	—
