= Stock Aitken Waterman =

English songwriting and record producing trio

- Origin: London, United Kingdom
- Genres: Hi-NRG; Eurobeat; pop; dance-pop
- Years active: 1984–1993; 2005–2010; 2015
- Labels: PWL; Epic
- Members: Mike Stock; Matt Aitken; Pete Waterman

Stock Aitken Waterman (abbreviated as SAW and also known as the Hit Factory) were an English songwriting and record production trio consisting of Mike Stock, Matt Aitken and Pete Waterman. The trio had great success from the mid-1980s through to the early-1990s. SAW is considered one of the most successful songwriting and producing partnerships of all time by the Guinness World Records, scoring more than 100 UK Top 40 hits (many of which were also worldwide successes) and earning an estimated £60 million in royalties. The trio had thirteen UK No. 1 singles including three consecutive UK No. 1s and three US No. 1 singles. They also had at least one record in the UK Top 100 Singles Chart every week between March 1986 and October 1990.

The group have sold 500 million units globally, and they also received a Brit Award for Best British Producer in 1987 along with nine Ivor Novello Awards between 1988 and 1990. In 1990 SAW picked up three Ivor Novello Awards for Songwriter of the Year, Most Performed Work for Donna Summer's "This Time I Know It's for Real" and Best Selling A-Side for Jason Donovan's "Too Many Broken Hearts".

SAW started producing underground club hits, but earned worldwide success with a mixture of hi-NRG-influenced sound, romantic Motown lyrics and Italo disco melodies with singles from Rick Astley, Bananarama, Mel and Kim, Donna Summer, Sinitta, Dead or Alive, Jason Donovan and Kylie Minogue. During 1984–1989, their musical style was labelled Eurobeat. They also put swing shuffle elements into their songs. The producers' legacy has been increasingly positively reassessed, with contemporary analysts praising the quality and enduring impact of their music.

== History ==
=== Formation and early hits: Divine, Hazell Dean, Dead or Alive (1984–1985) ===
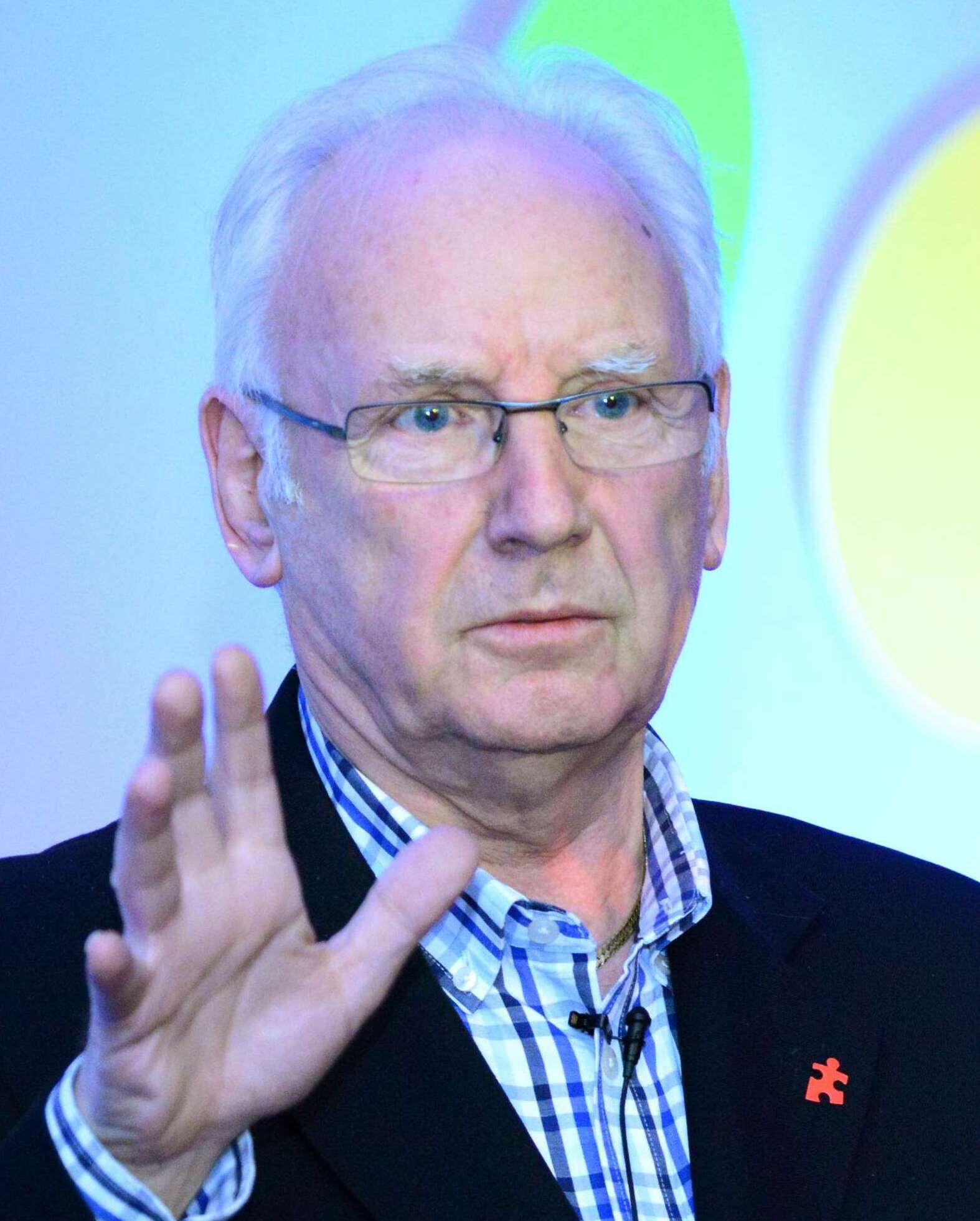
Pete Waterman in 2014

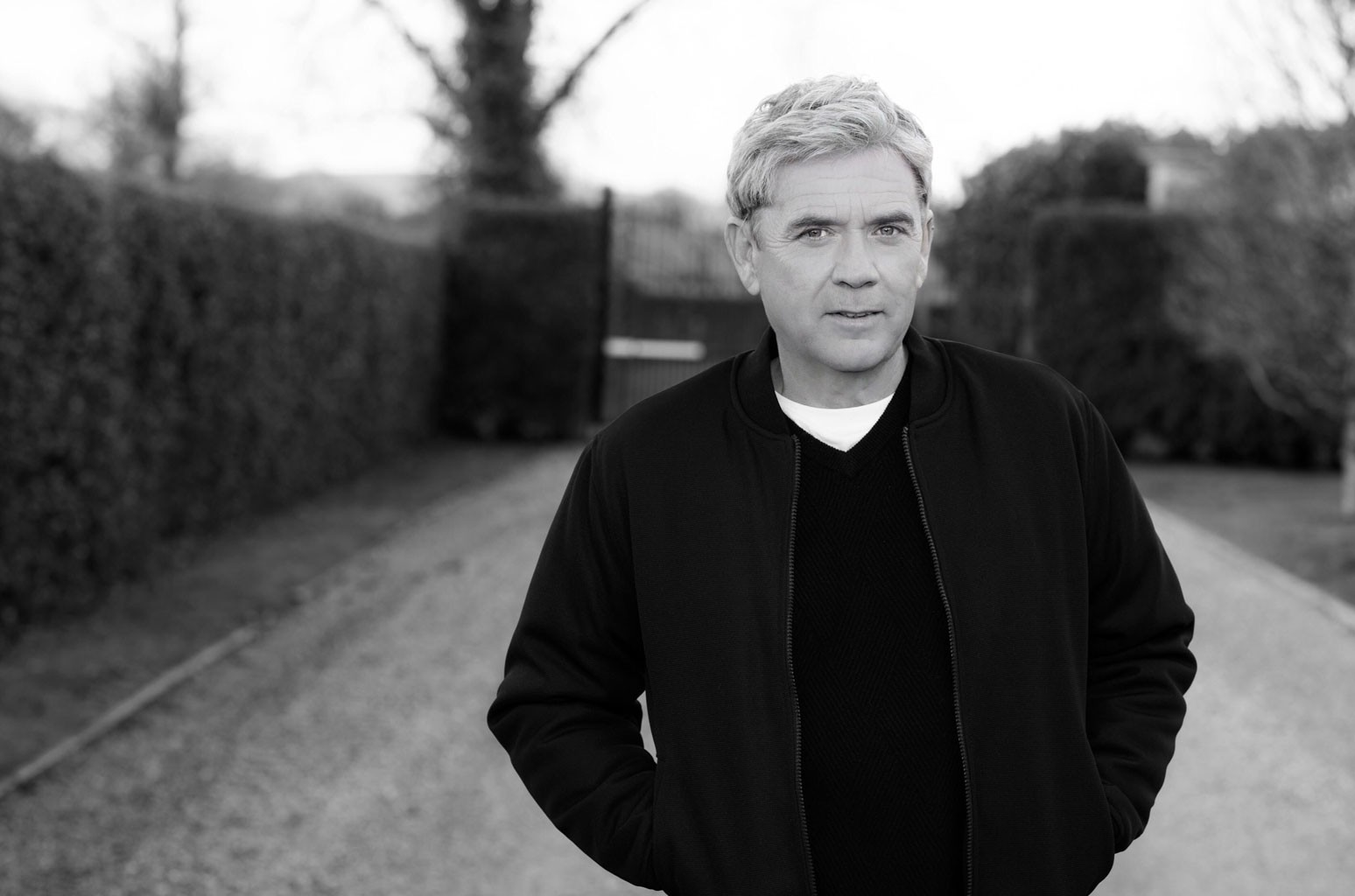
Mike Stock in 2019

Musician Mike Stock had briefly worked with DJ Pete Waterman in 1980 when John Milton, Mark Stock and Mike wrote a song – "One Nine for a Lady Breaker" – for a CB radio club. A version of the track found its way to Waterman who managed Peter Collins, then a successful producer with acts like Musical Youth and Nik Kershaw. The track was re-recorded and produced by Collins; Stock sang on the track under the alias Chris Britton. In January 1984, Stock and songwriter Matt Aitken arranged to meet Waterman at his office in the Stiff Records building, Camden Town. Waterman was seeking a new partnership and in February they went into the Marquee Studio in Wardour Street Soho to record the song "The Upstroke" for Agents Aren't Aeroplanes – a front for their concept of a female Frankie Goes To Hollywood. The record was released on Proto Records run by Barry Evangeli and Nick East and distributed by RCA and was championed by Radio 1's John Peel. It achieved popularity in the gay clubs and discos where many new records were promoted into the mainstream as Hi-NRG.

In 1983, Stock had been approached by Andy Paul, a Greek Cypriot, to write a song for Cyprus in the Eurovision Song Contest. "Anna Maria Lena" was voted by the Cypriot public to represent their country in the competition and the re-recorded version would be Stock and Aitken's second collaboration with Waterman. The team were then asked to produce a song for drag performer Divine and they recorded "You Think You're a Man" at the Marquee Studio, which was released by Proto Records in July 1984. The song reached No. 16 on the UK Singles Chart. Soon after, the team recorded Hazell Dean's "Whatever I Do, (Wherever I Go)". The song became Stock Aitken Waterman's first Top 10 hit, reaching No. 4 in the UK. This period saw a rapid refining of the core production team and their roles, with a fourth collaborator, Pete Ware, who was co-credited on the team's earliest records, leaving after Stock and Aitken objected to him taking a job touring with Dean.

In September 1984, SAW were approached by Dead or Alive frontman Pete Burns to produce the song "You Spin Me Round (Like a Record)", which became SAW's first UK No. 1 in March 1985. Although a massive commercial success, the trio were still in dire financial straits and the record set the scene for SAW's often fractious creative relationship with those bands and artists who demanded creative involvement in their records. Engineer Phil Harding, who mixed the track, said tensions were running so high between the band members and producers Stock and Aitken during mixing, that it almost escalated to violence. Stock has disputed the seriousness of studio tensions, alleging that Burns, Harding and Waterman have all "exaggerated" what happened in their recounting of events.

=== The Hit Factory: Bananarama, Mel and Kim, Princess (1985–1986) ===
In 1985, the trio built a new studio at The Vineyard recording studio complex, The Borough, which would later be dubbed "The Hit Factory". Whilst working with the band Brilliant, Stock wrote a song for their backing singer Desiree Heslop called "Say I'm Your Number One", which peaked at No. 7 on the UK Singles Chart. These chart successes and the trio's sound attracted the attention of girl group Bananarama towards the end of 1985. Group member Siobhan Fahey wanted to record a cover version of Shocking Blue's hit song "Venus". The result was a pop/hi-NRG reworking which became a worldwide chart hit, reaching No. 1 on the US Billboard Hot 100 chart in July 1986 and reaching the Top 10 in the UK and many other countries.

Bananarama went on to make Stock, Aitken and Waterman their main producers, and would collaborate with them on some of their biggest hits, including "Love in the First Degree" (UK No. 3), "I Can't Help It" (UK No. 20), and "I Heard a Rumour" (UK No. 14). The act were one of only a few who were given co-writing credits with the producers, with Stock describing the creative relationship as challenging; explaining he was obliged to collaborate with them due to a deal with their management. "It's very difficult to be creative if someone's just going to mock you, or laugh at you," he said. "With Bananarama it was just awkward, all the time very awkward, and I didn't feel comfortable writing with them." In 1986, Mel and Kim's first single "Showing Out (Get Fresh at the Weekend)" went to No. 3 on the UK charts and their follow-up "Respectable" reached No. 1.

=== Rick Astley, Ferry Aid (1987) ===
In 1987, Rick Astley recorded the team's biggest hit – "Never Gonna Give You Up" – though initially Stock and Aitken were unsure of its appeal with Astley's strong but unorthodox voice. When it was released by RCA, "Never Gonna Give You Up" went straight to No. 1 in 17 different countries including America and the UK where it became the biggest selling record of 1987. Astley's fourth single, "Together Forever" also topped the Billboard Hot 100. That year SAW produced "Let It Be" in aid of the victims involved in the Zeebrugge Ferry disaster, and Stock got the chance to work with his musical inspiration Paul McCartney whose original recordings of the Beatles were sent to the production team by producer George Martin. "Let It Be" went to No. 1 in the UK where it stayed for three weeks. In 1989, SAW would have another No. 1 with McCartney on the Gerry and the Pacemakers hit – "Ferry Cross the Mersey" – recorded to raise funds for the victims and their families of the Hillsborough Disaster.

=== The assembly line ===
They'd say, 'We're just making records for people to have a good time to.' They are utterly and totally Thatcherite and their records are utterly and totally Thatcherite records. In which sense they are perfect pop because they are totally records of their time.

— Neil Tennant of Pet Shop Boys discussing Stock Aitken Waterman in 1989

Following their early success, SAW's style evolved into a more mainstream synthpop, typically performed by attractive singers. Their usual method for creating the music was to write the songs themselves, although some of their early artists wrote or co-wrote their own material. Next they would record the music with extensive use of synthesizers, drum machines (drums were often credited to "A Linn", a reference to the Linn brand of drum machine) and sequencers; and then finally bring in a singer solely to record the vocal track. Pete Burns would criticise SAW for their methods, describing that "they took our sound and just basically wheeled it off with a load of other imbeciles, and that makes me a bit sour."

SAW's early work was recorded and mixed at Marquee Studios in Wardour Street, where Phil Harding and Rob Waldron worked with Dead or Alive on Youthquake. Waldron went to work as an assistant engineer to Harding when Waterman opened his new studio in Borough, London. Waldron became the chief recording engineer and Linn 9000 programmer (A Linn) and Harding was the mixer/remixer.

The tendency toward interchanging artists and repertoire was well established when Rick Astley's breakout album Whenever You Need Somebody got its name and title track from a minor hit the trio had produced a year earlier for O'Chi Brown. Similarly, many of their songs were tried out and recorded by multiple artists; Mel and Kim, Pepsi and Shirlie and Sinitta all recorded the song "Who's Gonna Catch You", both Kylie Minogue and Mandy Smith recorded "Got To Be Certain", whilst Mel and Kim, Carol Hitchcock and Hazell Dean gave vocals for "More Than Words Can Say". Their prodigious, production line–like output and similar song structures led to them being referred to as the Hit Factory, and attracted criticism from many quarters, including The Guardian newspaper, who unflatteringly dubbed the team, "Schlock, Aimless and Waterdown".

=== Kylie Minogue, Jason Donovan, Band Aid II (1988–1989) ===
In 1987, Waterman formed PWL (the in-house label of SAW) and one of the first artists to be released on the label was Australian soap star, Kylie Minogue. Stock was informed by Minogue's manager, Terry Blamey, that she had been in London for ten days waiting to work with SAW though Waterman had not informed Stock. By the time Minogue entered the studio, she was due on a plane back to Australia later that day. In forty minutes Stock and Aitken had written the song, "I Should Be So Lucky", recorded a backing track and Minogue's vocals. The single was released by PWL in February 1988 and climbed to the No. 1 spot in March where it stayed for five weeks, the joint longest running No. 1 of 1988. It also went to No. 1 in 25 other territories including Minogue's native country Australia.

With demand for a follow-up single, Minogue was not keen on returning to England to work with SAW again after the rushed treatment she had received. Stock flew to Australia to meet Minogue and her parents at her Melbourne home to apologise and successfully convinced her to record a follow-up single "Got to Be Certain", which reached No. 2 on the UK charts. When her debut album Kylie was released in August 1988 it sold 2.8 million copies. Minogue spent more weeks on the singles chart that year than any other artist. Minogue went on to record three more studio albums with SAW, scoring fifteen successive Top 10 UK hits including "Je Ne Sais Pas Pourquoi" (No. 2), "Hand on Your Heart" (No. 1), "Wouldn't Change a Thing" (No. 2), "Tears on My Pillow" (No. 1), "Better the Devil You Know" (No. 2) and "Shocked" (No. 6).

Soon after, Jason Donovan's first single, "Nothing Can Divide Us", became a Top 5 hit in both England and Australia. Donovan's next single, "Especially for You", a duet with Kylie Minogue, went to No. 1 in January 1989. A duet had not initially been planned by SAW until retailer Woolworths had taken huge orders for hundreds of thousands before the song had even been written. Stock wrote "Especially for You", sang the demo with a SAW backing singer and Aitken flew to Australia to record Minogue and Donovan's vocals in time for a Christmas release. Donovan returned to the studio to record the song "Too Many Broken Hearts", which went to No. 1 in March 1989. His debut album Ten Good Reasons also held to the top spot for three weeks, selling 1.5 million copies. Donovan went on to have numerous successful singles with SAW, including the No. 1 hit "Sealed with a Kiss", "Every Day (I Love You More)" (No. 2), and the Christmas No. 2 record "When You Come Back to Me", kept off the top spot by the Band Aid II SAW record "Do They Know It's Christmas?".

=== Donna Summer, Cliff Richard and later work (1989–1993) ===
In 1989, SAW had their most successful year with seven UK No. 1s (a feat equalled only by George Martin in 1963) and fifteen Top 5 hits. During that year, SAW wrote and produced over seven albums' worth of material for artists such as Kylie Minogue, Jason Donovan, Bananarama, Donna Summer, Cliff Richard and Paul McCartney. The team supplied Summer with "This Time I Know It's for Real", which became her biggest hit in the United Kingdom since 1979, reaching No. 3, and becoming Summer's final Top 10 hit on the US Billboard Hot 100. In January 1990, SAW had their last UK No. 1 single, Minogue's cover of "Tears on My Pillow". SAW also produced Cliff Richard's No. 3 single "I Just Don't Have the Heart" and gave 18-year-old singer Sonia a debut No. 1 with "You'll Never Stop Me Loving You".

Despite continued success in early 1990 with Minogue's singles and Lonnie Gordon's "Happenin' All Over Again" (No. 4), the partnership began to disband. The week of 13 October 1990 became the first with no SAW-produced singles in the UK Top 75 in over two years. In mid-1991, Aitken left the team due to stress and deep dissatisfaction with business and creative decisions made by Waterman. Stock stayed with Waterman to write and produce Minogue's fourth album, Let's Get to It, Sybil's 1993 hits, "The Love I Lost" (No. 3) and "When I'm Good and Ready" (No. 5), and Boy Krazy's "That's What Love Can Do" (which made it to No. 18 in the US). Later that year, Stock ended his relationship with Waterman following a disagreement over their finances; by the end of their partnership, SAW had written and/or produced over 300 Top 75 hits and 30 platinum albums.

=== Recent times ===
In 2005, the three producers reunited again and released a CD+DVD album, Stock Aitken Waterman Gold, with some of their best-known and most successful singles. In 2007, SAW released the Sheilas' single "(I'm So) Happy Happy (You're Mine)", which reached No. 91 in the UK. A reunion concert event called Hit Factory Live took place on 21 December 2012 at London's O2 Arena featuring many of the acts associated with Waterman's record labels. In December 2015, SAW made a return producing a remix of the Chris Martin-written Minogue song "Every Day's Like Christmas".

Stock and Waterman collaborated on the UK Eurovision 2010 entry "That Sounds Good to Me". It was revealed in the final round of Eurovision: Your Country Needs You on BBC One, in which Josh Dubovie eventually earned the right to perform the song at the contest. He finished in 25th place in the Eurovision Song Contest 2010, receiving 10 points in total.

In 2023, the trio reunited for the filming of the Channel 5 documentary Legends of Pop: Stock Aitken Waterman, each giving interviews both individually and as a group. On 21 March 2023, it was announced that a musical entitled I Should Be So Lucky, making use of SAW songs, would premiere at the Manchester Opera House before embarking on a UK tour. The musical is written and directed by the creator of the Nativity! franchise, Debbie Isitt, and choreographed by Jason Gilkison, the creative director of Strictly Come Dancing.

== UK number-one hits ==
Year	Title	Artist(s)	Notes
1985	"You Spin Me Round (Like a Record)"	Dead or Alive	
1987	"Respectable"	Mel and Kim	
1987	"Let It Be"	Ferry Aid	Cover of the 1970 Beatles' hit (charity single for the Zeebrugge Disaster Fund)
1987	"Never Gonna Give You Up"	Rick Astley	US No. 1
1987	"I Should Be So Lucky"	Kylie Minogue	
1988	"Especially for You"	Kylie Minogue and Jason Donovan	
1989	"Too Many Broken Hearts"	Jason Donovan	
1989	"Hand on Your Heart"	Kylie Minogue	
1989	"Ferry Cross the Mersey"	Christians, Holly Johnson, Paul McCartney, Gerry Marsden and SAW	Cover of the Gerry and the Pacemakers' 1964 hit (charity single for victims of the Hillsborough disaster)
1989	"Sealed with a Kiss"	Jason Donovan	Cover of the Brian Hyland single
1989	"You'll Never Stop Me Loving You"	Sonia	
1989	"Do They Know It's Christmas?"	Band Aid II	Charity single to raise money for the 1983–1985 famine in Ethiopia
1990	"Tears on My Pillow"	Kylie Minogue	Cover of the 1958 song by Little Anthony and the Imperials

== US number-one hits ==
Year	Title	Artist	Notes
1986	"Venus"	Bananarama	Cover of the 1969 Shocking Blue single
1988	"Never Gonna Give You Up"	Rick Astley	UK No. 1
1988	"Together Forever"	Rick Astley	UK No. 2

== See also ==
- List of songs produced by Stock Aitken Waterman
- Stock Aitken Waterman Gold
- The Hit Factory: The Best of Stock Aitken Waterman
- The Hit Factory Volume 2
- The Hit Factory Volume 3
- A Ton of Hits: The Very Best of Stock Aitken Waterman
- The Hit Factory: Pete Waterman's Greatest Hits

== Sources ==
- Gambaccini, Paul; Rice, Tim; Rice, Jonathan (1990). Guinness Hits of the 80s (1st ed.). Enfield: Guinness Publishing Ltd. ISBN 0-85112-398-8. OL 8266601M.
- Stock, Mike (2004). The Hit Factory: The Stock Aitken Waterman Story. London: New Holland Publishers. ISBN 1-84330-729-4. OL 9424888M.
