= Pat and Mick =

British pop duo

Pat and Mick were a British pop duo, consisting of popular radio personalities Pat Sharp and Mick Brown, both of whom are from London. They released cover versions each year from 1988 to 1993, achieving a top-10 hit with their 1989 single "I Haven't Stopped Dancing Yet". The royalties from their record sales were donated to Capital FM's 'Help A London Child' charity. All their singles were produced by Stock Aitken & Waterman except "Shake Your Groove Thing" and "Hot Hot Hot", both of which were produced by Stock & Waterman. The relationship began when Brown joked on air with producer Pete Waterman about turning the DJs into pop stars. In 1993, they released their only album, Don't Stop Dancin', which compiled all their singles and B-sides on a continuous mix.

In 2010, Pat & Mick appeared on the Identity Parade round on Never Mind the Buzzcocks. However, Phill Jupitus's team were only asked to identify Mick.

In 2011, Sharp entered I'm a Celebrity...Get Me Out of Here!.

In November 2011, Brown started hosting the Drive Time and Saturday Breakfast radio shows on 107.8 Radio Jackie, while Sharp presented the Weekend Breakfast slot on Smooth Radio. From February 2019, Sharp started presenting, a voice tracked, weekend mid-morning radio show on Greatest Hits Radio as well as P8 Pop in Norway.

== Discography ==
=== Albums ===
- 1993: Don't Stop Dancin'

=== Singles ===
- 1988: "Let's All Chant" / "On the Night" (UK #11, credited to 'Mick and Pat')
- 1989: "I Haven't Stopped Dancing Yet" (UK #9, Finland #2, Europe #30)
- 1990: "Use It Up and Wear It Out" (UK #22, US #81)
- 1990: "Ole Ole Ole" (released under the name 'L.A. Mood') (UK #78)
- 1991: "Gimme Some" (UK #53)
- 1991: "The Concrete Megamix" (UK #90)
- 1992: "Shake Your Groove Thing" (UK #80)
- 1993: "Hot Hot Hot" (UK #47)

== See also ==
- List of performances on Top of the Pops
