= Pete Waterman Entertainment =

UK record label

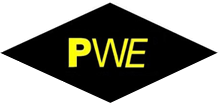
The company logo

Pete Waterman Entertainment (PWE) is the production company one-time pop and dance record label owned by British pop mogul Pete Waterman. The label, originally PWL (Pete Waterman Limited), is most famous for being the home of hit record producers Stock Aitken Waterman.

== History ==
After producing many hits for other record companies, PWL launched its own label in 1987 (PWL Records) with the single "I Just Can't Wait" by Mandy Smith. After several promos that were eventually licensed to other labels, the next single commercially released on PWL Records (PWL8) was the biggest selling single of 1988: "I Should Be So Lucky" by Kylie Minogue. Stock Aitken Waterman also used the label to release material under their own name, including top twenty hit, "Roadblock".

As an independent record label, PWL enjoyed number ones with Australian artists Kylie Minogue and Jason Donovan, as well as top ten hits with British artists, such as Pat and Mick, The Reynolds Girls, American singer Sybil Lynch, and Dutch dance group, 2 Unlimited. As a production house, they produced hits for English artists including, Hazell Dean, Rick Astley, Dead or Alive, Bananarama, Sonia, Brother Beyond, Samantha Fox and Mel and Kim, all licensed to other record labels.

In the US, PWL America was established in 1989 and specialized primarily in hip-hop music, launching the careers of MCs Ed O.G. and Diamond D. In 1992, it was renamed Chemistry Records Ltd., but it shut its doors in 1993. It was distributed in that territory by Mercury/PolyGram Records.

In the early 1990s, Pete Waterman formed a new label called PWL International in partnership with Warner Music; one of the artists that recorded for the label, Opus III, scored two number ones on Billboard's Dance Club Songs Chart through a US deal with Warner's EastWest Records. However, with other projects taking up Waterman's time, his involvement in the label decreased, and PWL International Ltd. became the Warner label Coalition.

After PWL International, the record label side of PWE was in operation until the mid 2000s as the label EBUL, run through former labels Jive Records and Zomba (now part of Sony Music Entertainment). EBUL stood for Eastern Bloc Unity Label with Eastern Bloc and Unity being two north west record shops that PWL had taken over. One of the last records that EBUL/PWE released was "Teenage Life", the British entry for the Eurovision Song Contest 2006, sung by Daz Sampson.

As of March 2017, most of the PWL/PWE catalogue is now distributed by BMG Rights Management. In November 2023, BMG and PWE released a triple CD and two double vinyl LPs, PWL Extended: Big Hits and Surprises, containing 24 12" PWL remixes of primarily Stock Aitken Waterman productions, which was well received. No tracks were licensed from other record companies though acts like Sigue Sigue Sputnik, The Blow Monkeys and Agents Aren't Aeroplanes were released on other labels before becoming part of BMG's catalogue. An exclusive Blu-ray edition was also released via the Super Deluxe Edition website.

== Notable former PWL artists ==
Some of these acts were produced at the PWL Hit Factory and were signed to PWL Records, whilst others were licensed to PWL from other European independent dance labels (e.g. Media or Byte):

- Anticapella
- Jason Donovan (left in 1991)
- Kakko
- Kylie Minogue (left in 1992)
- Lonnie Gordon
- Loveland
- Mandy Smith
- Mel & Kim
- Niki Evans
- One True Voice
- Opus III
- Pop!
- The Reynolds Girls
- Steps
- Strange Nature (left in 1995)
- Sybil
- Tina Cousins
- 2 Unlimited
- Undercover

=== Acts produced by Stock Aitken Waterman ===
These acts were produced at the PWL Hit Factory, but were not signed directly to PWL Records:

- Bananarama (signed to London Records)
- Big Fun (left in 1991)
- Bobby Farrell, Maizie Williams and Marcia Barrett of Boney M. for the unauthorised single "Everybody Wants to Dance Like Josephine Baker"
- Boy Krazy
- Brother Beyond (signed to EMI's Parlophone label)
- Cliff Richard
- Dead or Alive (left in 1988) (signed to CBS' Epic Records, now Sony Music)
- Divine
- Donna Summer
- Hazell Dean
- London Boys
- Princess
- Rick Astley (left in 1990)
- Sabrina Salerno
- Samantha Fox
- Same Difference
- The Sheilas
- Sinitta
- Sonia (left in 1991)

== Chemistry/PWL America artists ==
- Kim Appleby
- B.O.X.
- Diamond and the Psychotic Neurotics
- Ed O.G. & da Bulldogs
- Poizon Posse
- Sylk Smoov

== See also ==
- Lists of record labels
