= Pride (disambiguation) =

Pride is a high sense of the worth of one's self and one's own, or a pleasure taken in the contemplation of these things.

Pride also commonly refers to:

- Pride (LGBTQ culture), a form of support for LGBTQ people
- Pride, or hubris, one of the Seven Deadly Sins

Pride may also refer to:

== People ==
- Pride (surname)
- Pride Tomlinson (1890–1967), American justice of the Tennessee Supreme Court

== Locations ==
- Pride, Alabama, an unincorporated community
- Pride, Louisiana, an unincorporated community
- Pride, Ohio, an unincorporated community

== Arts, entertainment and media ==
=== Fictional characters ===
- Pride (comics), a group of supervillains in the Marvel Comics series Runaways
- Pride (Fullmetal Alchemist), the evil homunculus from the Fullmetal Alchemist manga and anime series
- Pride, from the TV series The Tribe

=== Films ===
- Pride (1938 film), an Italian film starring Fosco Giachetti
- Pride (1955 film), a Spanish film
- Pride (1998 film), a Japanese film
- Pride (2004 film), a British film
- Pride (2007 film), an American sports film starring Terrence Howard
- Pride (2014 film), a British film

=== Literature and print ===
- Pride (manga), a manga and a 2009 Japanese film based on it
- Pride Magazine, a British lifestyle magazine
- The Pride LA, a newspaper serving the Los Angeles LGBTQ community published by the Mirror Media Group

=== Music ===
==== Albums ====
- Pride (Arena album)
- The Pride (InMe album)
- Pride (Johnna album)
- Pride (Living Colour album)
- Pride (Phosphorescent album)
- Pride (Robert Palmer album)
- Pride (White Lion album)
- Pride (Yaki-da album)
- Pride: A Tribute to Charley Pride, by Neal McCoy
- Pride: The Royal Philharmonic Orchestra Plays U2, a U2 cover album by the Royal Philharmonic Orchestra

==== Songs ====
- "Pride" (Amy Macdonald song)
- "The Pride" (Five Finger Death Punch song), 2012
- "Pride" (High and Mighty Color song)
- "The Pride" (The Isley Brothers song)
- "Pride" (Janie Fricke song)
- "Pride" (Kendrick Lamar song)
- "Pride" (Nothing's Carved in Stone song)
- "Pride" (Sara Evans song), 2024
- "Pride" (Scandal song)
- "Pride" (Simon Collins song)
- "Pride (In the Name of Love)", a song by U2
- "Bold & Delicious/Pride", a song by Ayumi Hamasaki
- "Pride", by American Authors from What We Live For
- "Pride", by Arrested Development from Zingalamaduni
- "Pride", by Damageplan from New Found Power
- "Pride", by Echo & The Bunnymen from Crocodiles
- "Pride", by Felix Jaehn, 2025
- "The Pride", by Five Finger Death Punch from American Capitalist
- "Pride", by Hüsker Dü from Zen Arcade
- "Pride", by Johnna from Pride
- "Pride", by Leanne Mitchell from her self-titled album
- "Pride", by Living Colour from Time's Up
- "Pride", by Mussorgsky
- "Pride", by Richard Thompson from 13 Rivers
- "Pride", by Robert Palmer from Pride
- "Pride", by Robin Schulz from Sugar
- "Pride", by Saliva from Back Into Your System
- "Pride", by Seether from Disclaimer II
- "Pride", by SOiL from Redefine
- "Pride", by Syntax from Meccano Mind

=== Television ===
- Pride (American TV series), an American documentary television series, first broadcast in 2021
- Pride (Japanese TV series), a Japanese drama starring Takuya Kimura, first broadcast in 2004
- Pride (Canadian TV series), a Canadian documentary television series, first broadcast in 2019
- Pride: The Series, an American drama series, broadcast from 2013
- "Pride" (Degrassi: The Next Generation), an episode of Degrassi: The Next Generation
- "Pride" (Law & Order), an episode of Law & Order

=== Other arts, entertainment, and media ===
- The Pride (play), a 2008 play by Alexi Kaye Campbell
- The Pride of West Virginia, the official nickname of the West Virginia University Mountaineer Marching Band
- Pride FC: Fighting Championships, the official video game developed for Pride Fighting Championship in 2003

== Businesses and organizations ==
- Personal Rights in Defense and Education, or PRIDE, an LGBTQ political organization
- Personal Responsibility in a Desirable Environment, or PRIDE, a non-profit organization
- Pride Bank Limited, a Tier II credit institution in Uganda
- Pride Fighting Championships, a Japanese former mixed martial arts promotion company
- Pride Microfinance Limited
- Pride, a defunct brand of furniture polish made by Johnson Wax
- Pride.com, an online LGBTQ social network

== Science ==
- Pride, a family group of lions
- Planetary Radio Interferometer & Doppler Experiment, or PRIDE, a scientific payload on board the Jupiter Icy Moon Explorer (JICE)
- Programme for Reusable In-orbit Demonstrator in Europe, or PRIDE, a European Space Agency (ESA) unmanned spaceplane project
- Proteomics Identifications Database, or PRIDE

== Sports ==
- Boston Pride, a professional ice hockey team (2013–2023) based in Boston
- Mississippi Pride, a professional American football team in 1999
- Nashua Pride, a Can-Am League baseball team
- New Jersey Pride, a professional lacrosse team in Major League Lacrosse
- Orlando Pride, a women's professional soccer team in the National Women's Soccer League
- Toledo Pride, an American indoor soccer team based in Toledo, Ohio, for the 1986–1987 American Indoor Soccer Association season
- Hofstra Pride, the athletic teams of Hofstra University, Hempstead, New York, US
- Pride, the athletic teams of Springfield College, Springfield, Massachusetts, US
- Pride, the name of the University of Prince Edward Island mascot
- The Pride of Oklahoma Marching Band or "The Pride", the student marching band for the University of Oklahoma Sooners
- The Pride of West Virginia, the marching band of West Virginia University
- Pride (horse), a champion French race mare
- The Pride (professional wrestling), a professional wrestling tag team consisting of Bobby Lashley, Street Profits, and B-Fab
- PRIDE Fighting Championships, a mixed martial arts organization in Japan
- USSSA Pride, a women's professional softball team

== Transportation ==
- Carnival Pride, a Spirit class cruise ship operated by Carnival Cruise Line
- Kia Pride, a car built by Kia Motors
- Pride Air, a defunct US airline
- PRIDE, Melbourne rail network, a system used for announcements and timetable information at Melbourne railway stations
- Seabulk Pride, an oil tanker

== See also ==
- Pryde
