= Pride (Johnna album) =

Studio album by Johnna
- Released: 22 July 1996
- Genre: Europop, synthpop, Hi-NRG
- Length: 45:18
- Label: PWL International
- Producer: Gary Miller; Pete Waterman; Motiv8; Karl Twigg; Mark Topham

Singles from Pride
- 1. "Do What You Feel" Released: 26 January 1996; 2. "In My Dreams" Released: 25 April 1996; 3. "Pride" Released: 8 July 1996; 4. "Let The Spirit Move You" Released: 21 October 1996

Pride is the debut, solo album of American pop singer Johnna Lee Cummings, released under the name Johnna. The album was released in July 1996 on PWL International.

== Background ==
Cummings first found success as a member of the American pop group Boy Krazy, who were formed in New York City through auditions held by talent agents in 1990. The group was signed to a sub-label of Polydor Records. They were flown to London to record material with Stock Aitken Waterman, who had massive success in both the UK and the US in the 1980s with acts like Kylie Minogue, Bananarama, Rick Astley, Jason Donovan, Dead Or Alive among many others.

Their debut single "That's What Love Can Do" was released in the UK in July 1991, peaking at No. 86. The follow-up single "All You Have To Do" stalled at No. 91 in February 1992, resulting in Polydor deciding to drop the group from the label. By chance, as the group was returning to the US to finalize the release from their record deal in the fall of 1992, a Denver radio station discovered a re-edit of "That's What Love Can Do" found on a Hot Tracks remix compilation. An employee of the station loved the track, and they decided to edit the song down to be suitable for radio and playlist it. Shortly after, it because the station's most requested song. The success revived interest in the group, and the girls were flown back to London in December 1992 to finished their album. "That's What Love Can Do" was officially released in January 1993 and peaked at No. 18 on the Billboard Hot 100, and No. 2 on the radio Pop Charts.

After the follow-up single "Good Times With Bad Boys" stalled at No. 59 on the Hot 100 in the US, Cummings decided to leave the group. She returned to New York City, working as a waitress and started collaborating with writers and producers like Junior Vasquez, eventually signing a solo deal with PWL International in the mid 90s.

== Singles and chart performance ==
The album's sound is a mixture of hard house, Europop, and Hi-NRG, showcasing Cummings as a dance artist. The first single "Do What You Feel", which featured remixes from Matt Darey, sparked interest and popularity in the dance club scene and peaked at No. 43 on the UK Singles Chart in February 1996, staying in the top 75 for two weeks. "In My Dreams" was the follow-up single, stalling at No. 66 in May 1996. Despite this, the third single "Pride", which was produced and mixed by Motiv8 was given a release, yet peaked outside the top 75 at No. 85. Even though it didn't make a large impact on the charts, "Pride" is often hailed as a classic 90s gay pride anthem, and was played frequently at gay pride parades during this time. The final single from the album, "Let The Spirit Move You", which featured a remix from Tony de Vit, was released in October 1996. The single saw a similar fate, failing to reach the top 75 on the singles chart and peaking at No. 126. The album itself did not place on the UK albums chart as well, and no further records were released.

== Track listing ==
No.	Title	Writer(s)	Producer(s)	Length
1.	"In My Dreams"	Miller; Paul Barry; Steve Torch; Waterman	Miller; Waterman	3:02
2.	"I Live For The Night"	Topham; Twigg	TTW	5:35
3.	"Pride"	Miller; Barry; Torch; Waterman	Motiv8	3:44
4.	"Out Of The Dark"	Topham; Twigg	TTW	4:00
5.	"Gotta Be Myself"	Miller; Barry; Torch; Waterman	Miller; Waterman	3:38
6.	"Some You Win, Some You Lose"	Miller; Barry; Torch; Waterman	Miller; Waterman	3:52
7.	"Treat Me Right"	Miller; Barry; Torch; Waterman	Miller; Waterman	3:38
8.	"Drive Me Crazy"	Miller; Barry; Torch; Waterman	Miller; Waterman	3:38
9.	"Let The Spirit Move You"	Miller; Barry; Torch; Waterman	Miller; Waterman	3:35
10.	"Need You To Stay Tonight"	Miller; Barry; Torch; Waterman	Miller; Waterman	3:32
11.	"Out Of My Head"	Topham; Twigg	TTW	3:37
12.	"Do What You Feel"	Topham; Twigg	TTW	3:23
Total length:				45:18

== Release history ==
Country	Date	Label	Format	Catalogue number
United Kingdom	22 July 1996	PWL International	CD	0630 154782
