= Boy Crazy (disambiguation) =

"Boy Crazy" is a 2025 song by Kesha.

Boy Crazy may refer to:

- Boy Crazy (film), a 1922 American comedy film
- "Boy Crazy", a 2010 single by Jasmine Sagginario
- "Boy Crazy", a 2000 song by New Found Glory from New Found Glory
- "Boy Crazy", a 1975 song by The Tubes from The Tubes
- "Boy Crazy", a 2004 episode of American TV series The Simple Life
- Boy Crazy, a collectible card game by Decipher, Inc.

== See also ==
- Boy Krazy, an American musical group
  - Boy Krazy (album), the group's only album
- "Boyz Crazy", 2013 episode of Gravity Falls
- Crazy Boy (born 1978), Mexican professional wrestler
- Crazy Boy (film)
