= Rue DeBona =

American singer/actress/wrestler

Personal information
- Born: Ruthann DeBona; March 7, 1976 (age 50) Glen Rock, New Jersey, U.S.
- Spouse: Josh Mathews (m. 2006; div. 2008)

Professional wrestling career
- Ring name(s): Rue DeBona; Rue
- Billed height: 5 ft 9 in (175 cm)
- Billed weight: 123 lb (56 kg)
- Debut: 2003
- Retired: June 2004

Ruthann DeBona (born March 7, 1976) is an American singer, actress and broadcaster. She is better known by her various stage names Ruth Ann Roberts and Rue DeBona and is best known for her time as a member of the pop group Boy Krazy, and for her brief stint in the World Wrestling Entertainment (WWE).

== Early career ==
DeBona, started her career as an actress. Mainly starring in background roles as an extra. She has guest appearances in shows such as; Law & Order, Mickey Mouse Club House, The Sopranos and Spin City. DeBona continued her acting career starring in the independent film They're Just My Friends and the Steven Seagal film, Pistol Whipped.

DeBona was Miss Junior America.

== Boy Krazy ==
DeBona was a member of the pop group Boy Krazy, using the stage name Ruth Ann Roberts. The group was formed through auditions by a management company in New York in 1991. In 1992 the bands 1991 single, That's What Love Can Do, began gaining success in nightclubs across America, beginning to play on multiple radio stations across the country. The song was remixed and re-released, becoming a hit in the U.S., peaking at number 18 on the Billboard Hot 100, in the months of February and March 1993.

The band released their first album titled Boy Krazy, in 1993, which included follow-up single Good Times with Bad Boys, which also hit the Billboard Hot 100. The lead singer of the band, Johnna Lee Cummings, left the band in late 1993. The remaining band members attempted to develop a new album, unsuccessfully, the group disbanded shortly after.

== Professional wrestling career ==
World Wrestling Entertainment (2003-2004)

In 2003, DeBona signed with the WWE as the new co-host of their show, Afterburn; she became the main host shortly after her debut episode.

In 2004, DeBona became the backstage interviewer for HEAT. On the February 5, 2004 episode, of Smackdown!, DeBona made her main roster debut, officially announcing the Playboy magazine cover featuring WWE Divas; Sable and Torrie Wilson. She was also featured on the February 12, 2004 episode of Smackdown!, interviewing Sable and Torrie Wilson on their upcoming Playboy cover. She appeared on the WrestleMania XX pre-show as a backstage interviewer, interviewing the Big Show about his match against John Cena. In June 2004, DeBona asked for her release from the company, which she was granted.

In 2005, DeBona was featured on John Cena's single; Summer Flings.

== Personal life ==
DeBona was married to former WWE and TNA, commentator Josh Matthews, from November 2006, until their divorce in 2008.

== Filmography ==
Film and television
Year	Title	Role	Notes
1993	Friday Night	Self; guest	1 episode
1993	Mickey Mouse Club House	Self; guest	1 episode
1998	Savant	Ruthann	
2001	Love the Hard Way	Hooker #2	
2003-2004	WWE Afterburn	Host	
2005	Damage Control	Biker chick	1 episode
2006	Inside Man	Bank employee hostage	
2006	They're Just My Friends	Gina	Independent film
2008	Pistol Whipped	Emily	
