= List of former WWE personnel (D–H) =

WWE is a sports entertainment company based in Stamford, Connecticut. Former employees (family name letters D–H) in WWE consist of professional wrestlers, managers, play-by-play and color commentators, announcers, interviewers, referees, trainers, script writers, executives, and board of directors.

WWE talents' contracts range from developmental contracts to multi-year deals. They primarily appeared on WWE television programming, pay-per-views, and live events, and talent with developmental contracts appeared at NXT (formerly Florida Championship Wrestling), or they appeared at WWE's former training facilities: Deep South Wrestling, Heartland Wrestling Association, International Wrestling Association, Memphis Championship Wrestling, or Ohio Valley Wrestling. When talent is released of their contract, it could be for a budget cut, the individual asking for their release, for personal reasons, time off from an injury, or retirement. In some cases, talent has died while they were contracted, such as Brian Pillman, Owen Hart, Eddie Guerrero, Chris Benoit and Bray Wyatt.

Those who made appearances without a contract and those who were previously released but are currently employed by WWE are not included.

== Alumni (D-H) ==
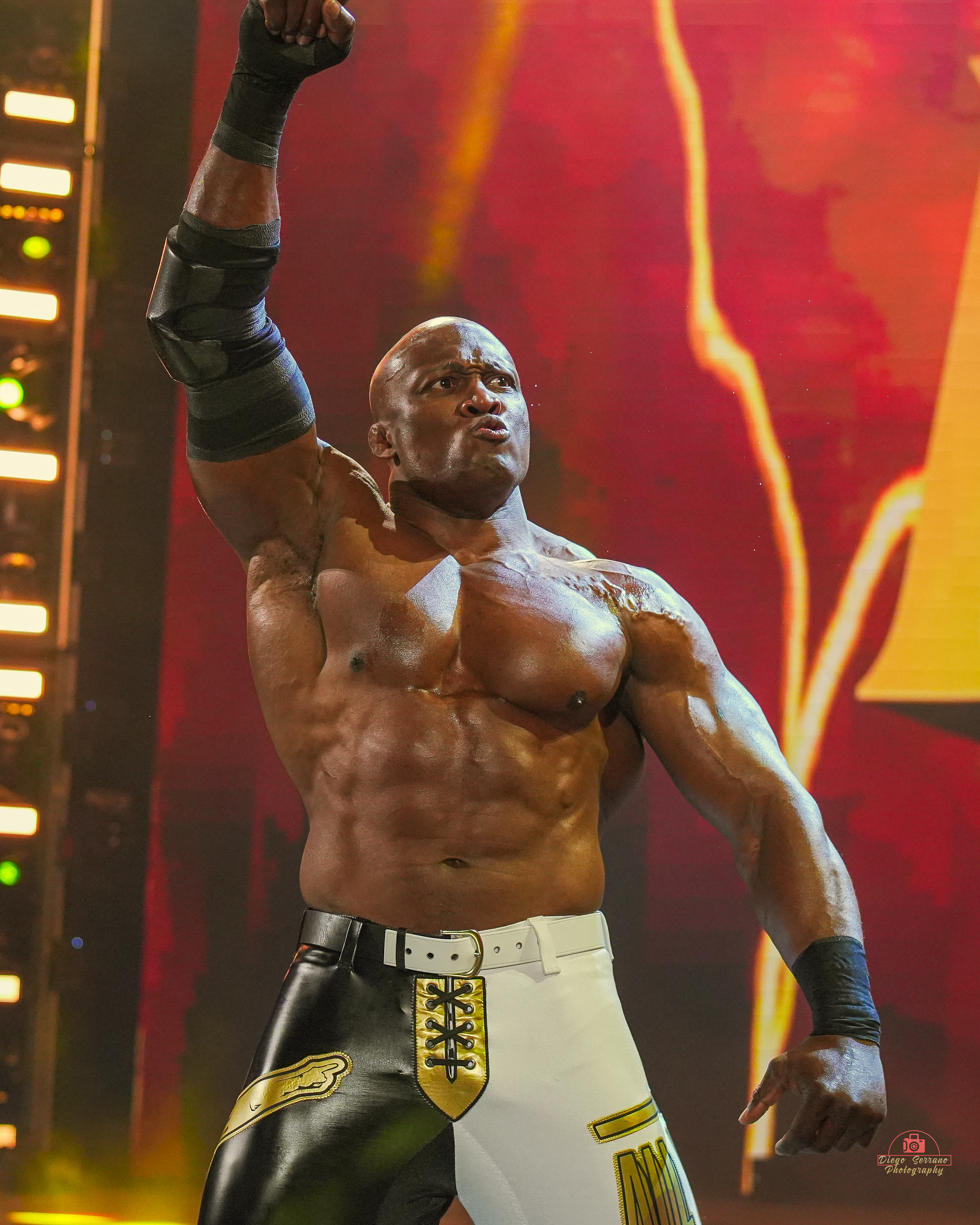
Bobby Lashley

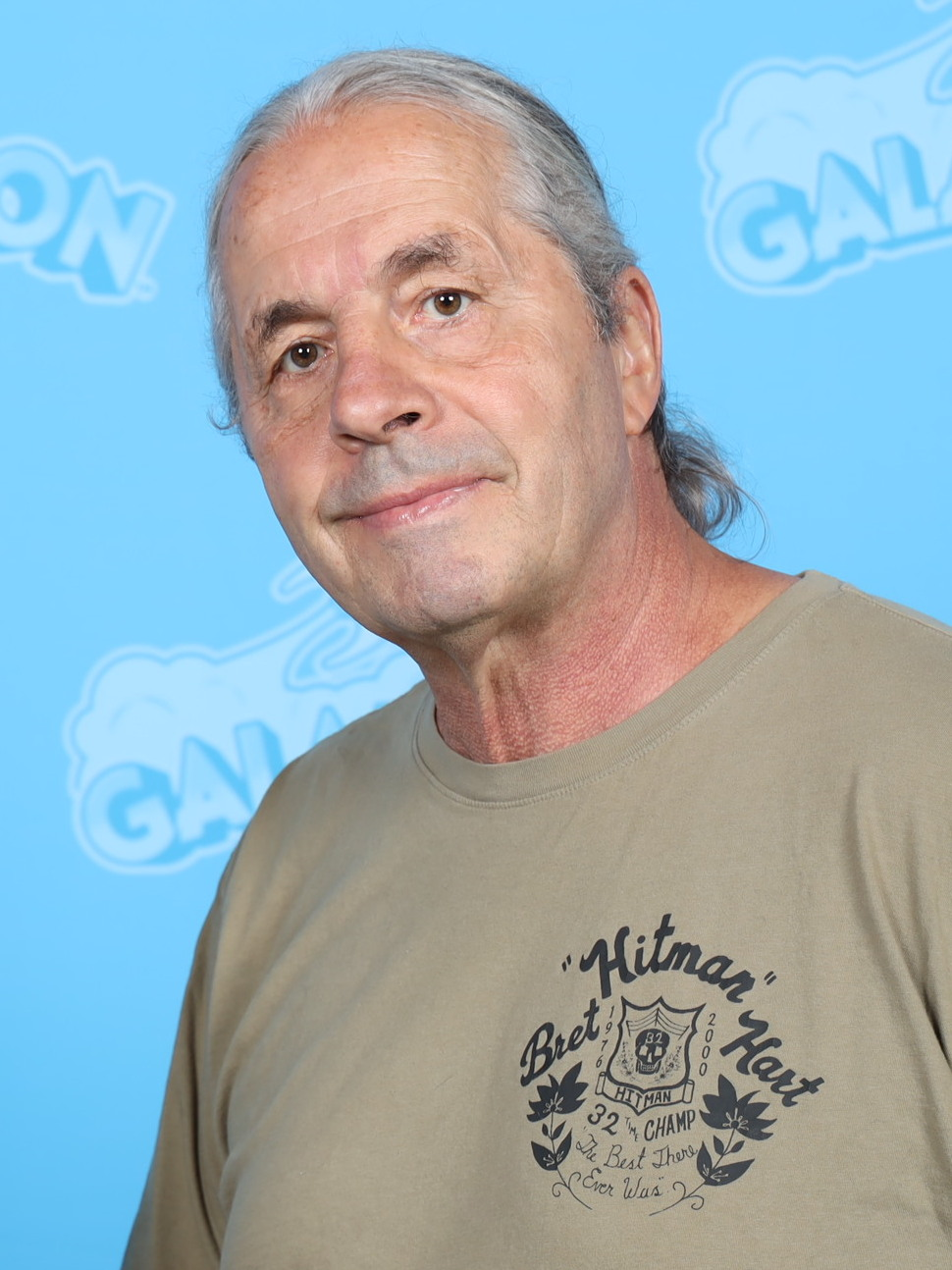
Bret Hart

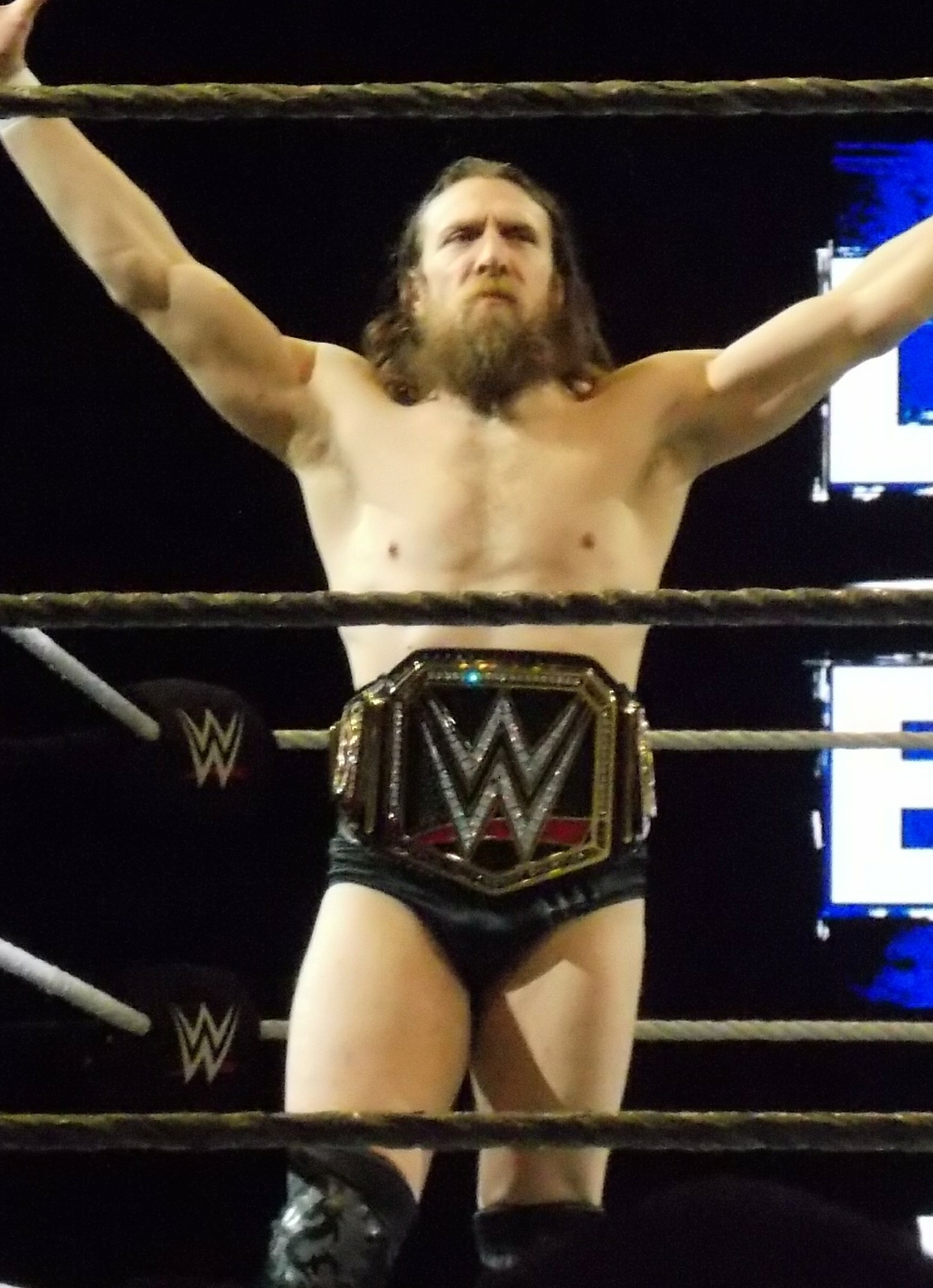
Daniel Bryan

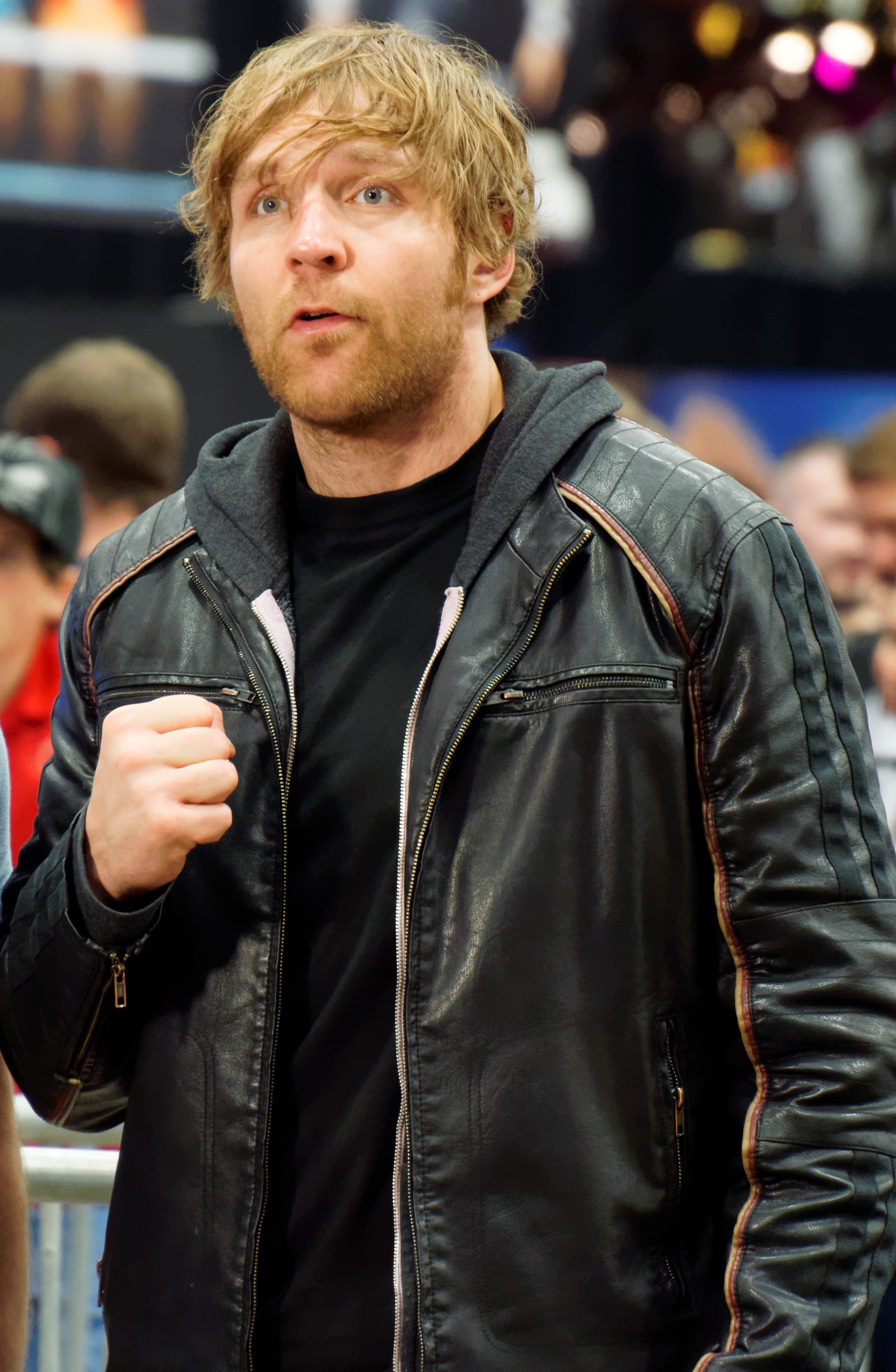
Dean Ambrose

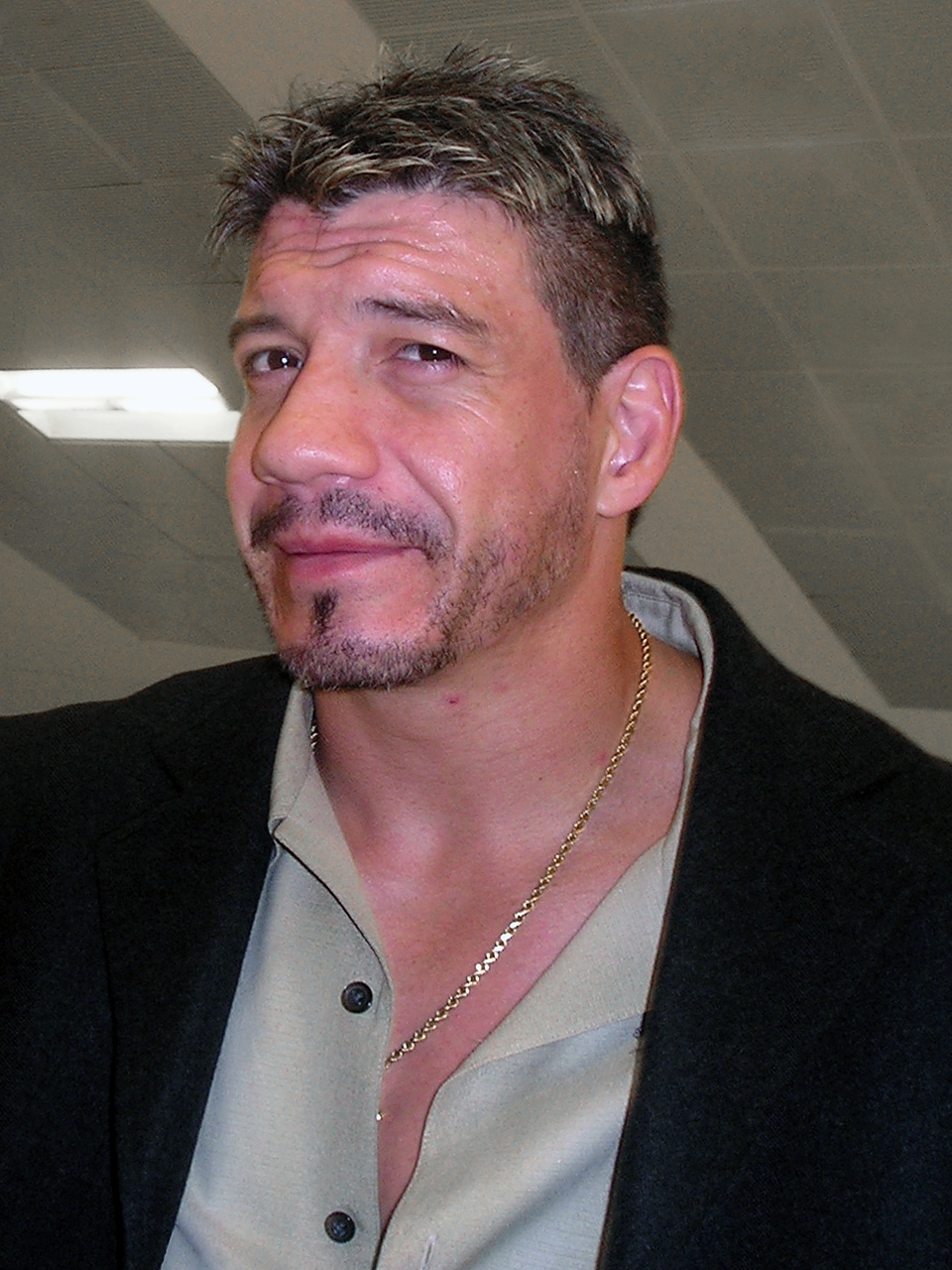
Eddie Guerrero

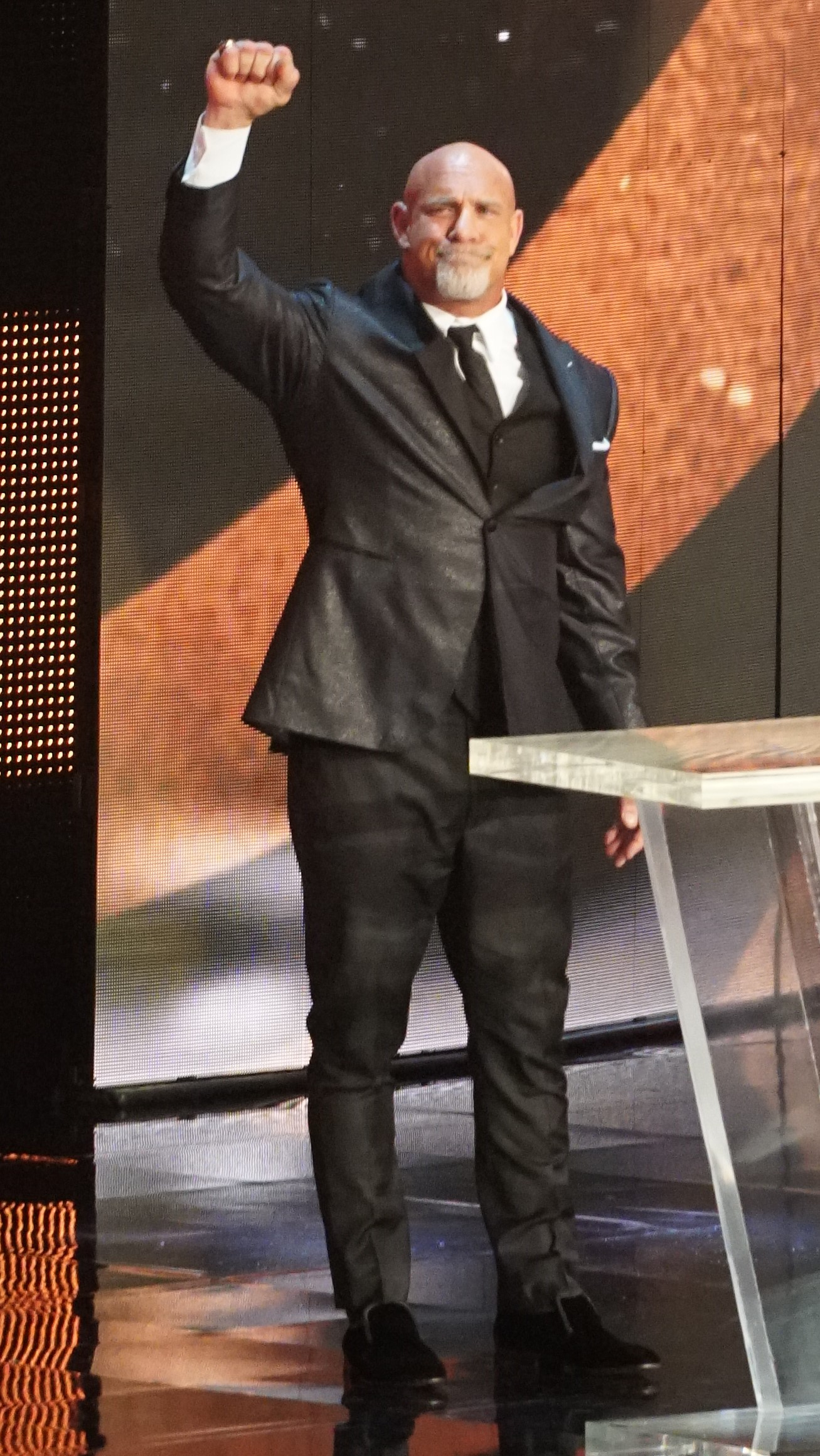
Goldberg

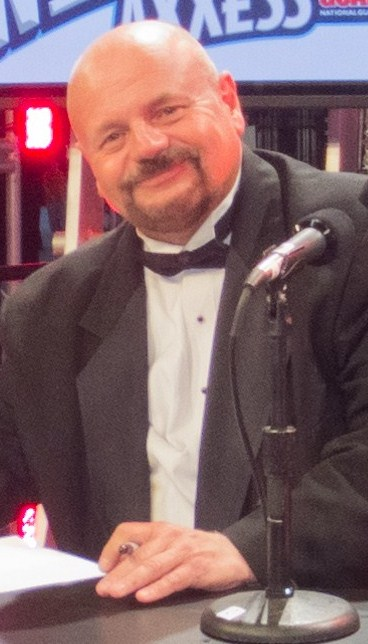
Howard Finkel

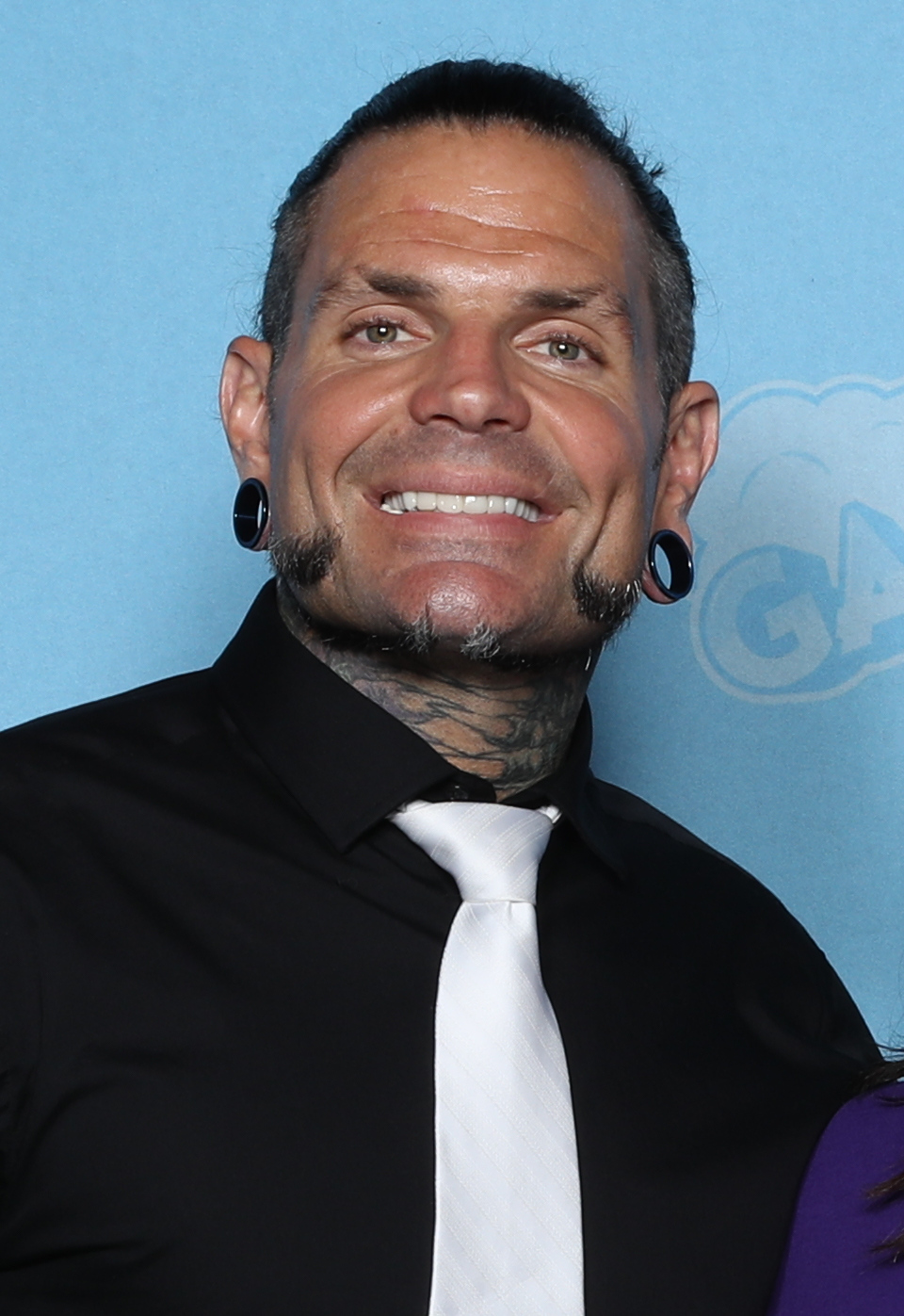
Jeff Hardy

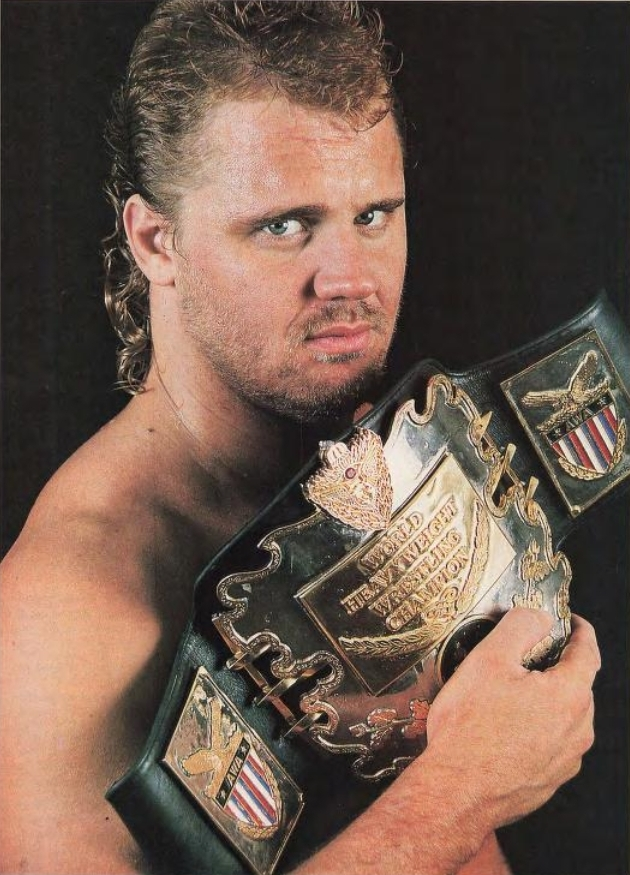
Mr. Perfect

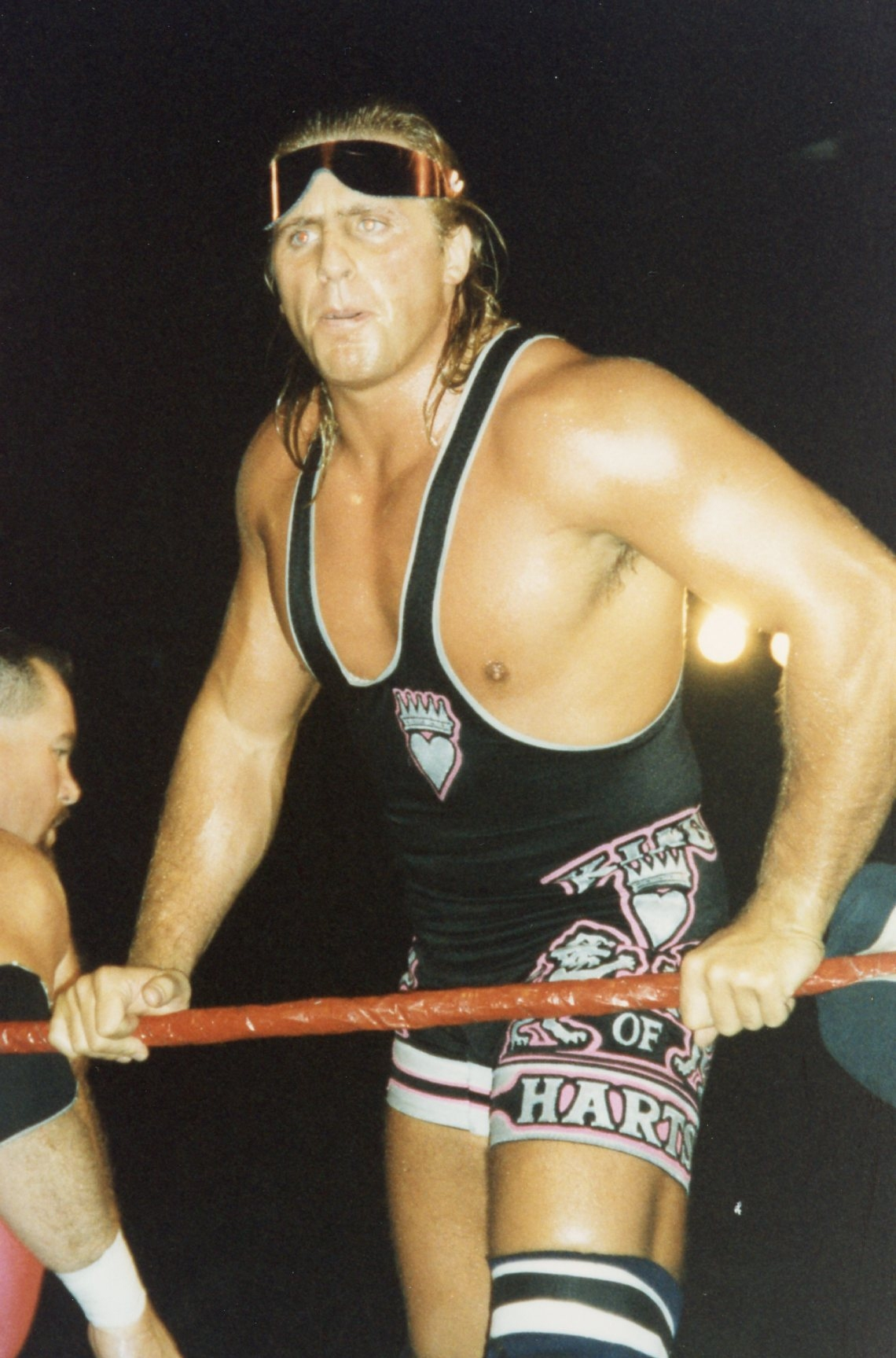
Owen Hart

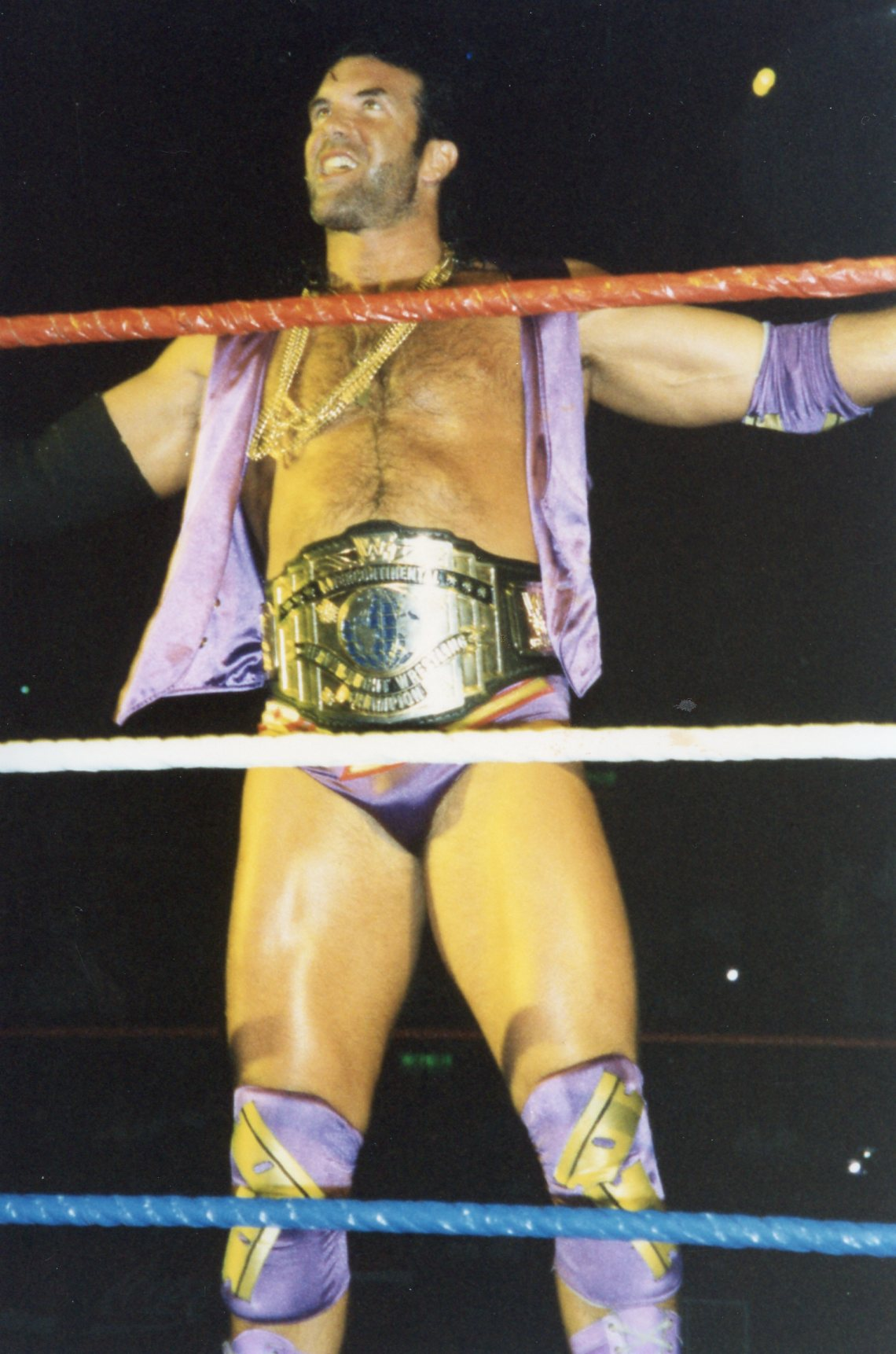
Razor Ramon

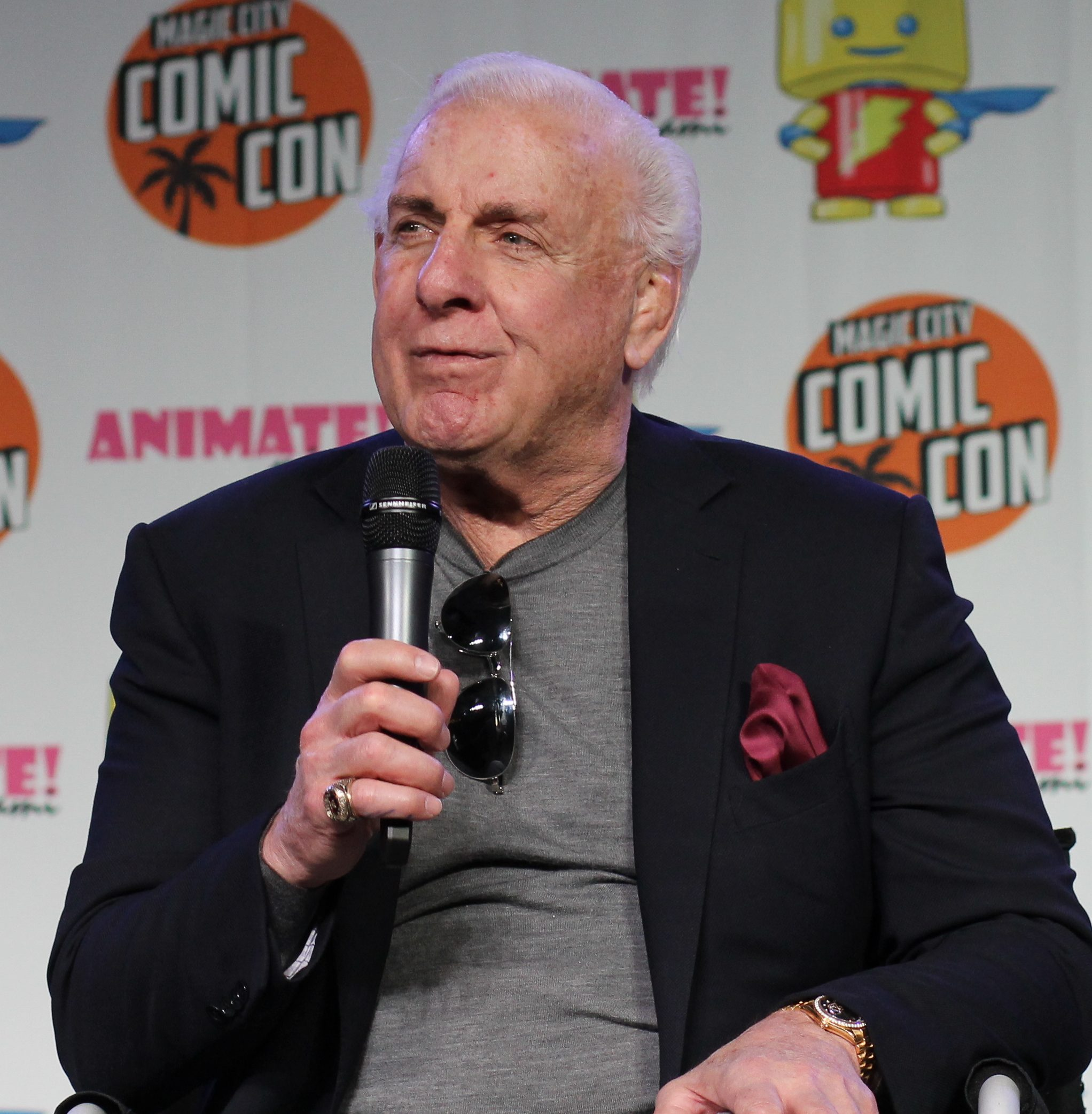
Ric Flair

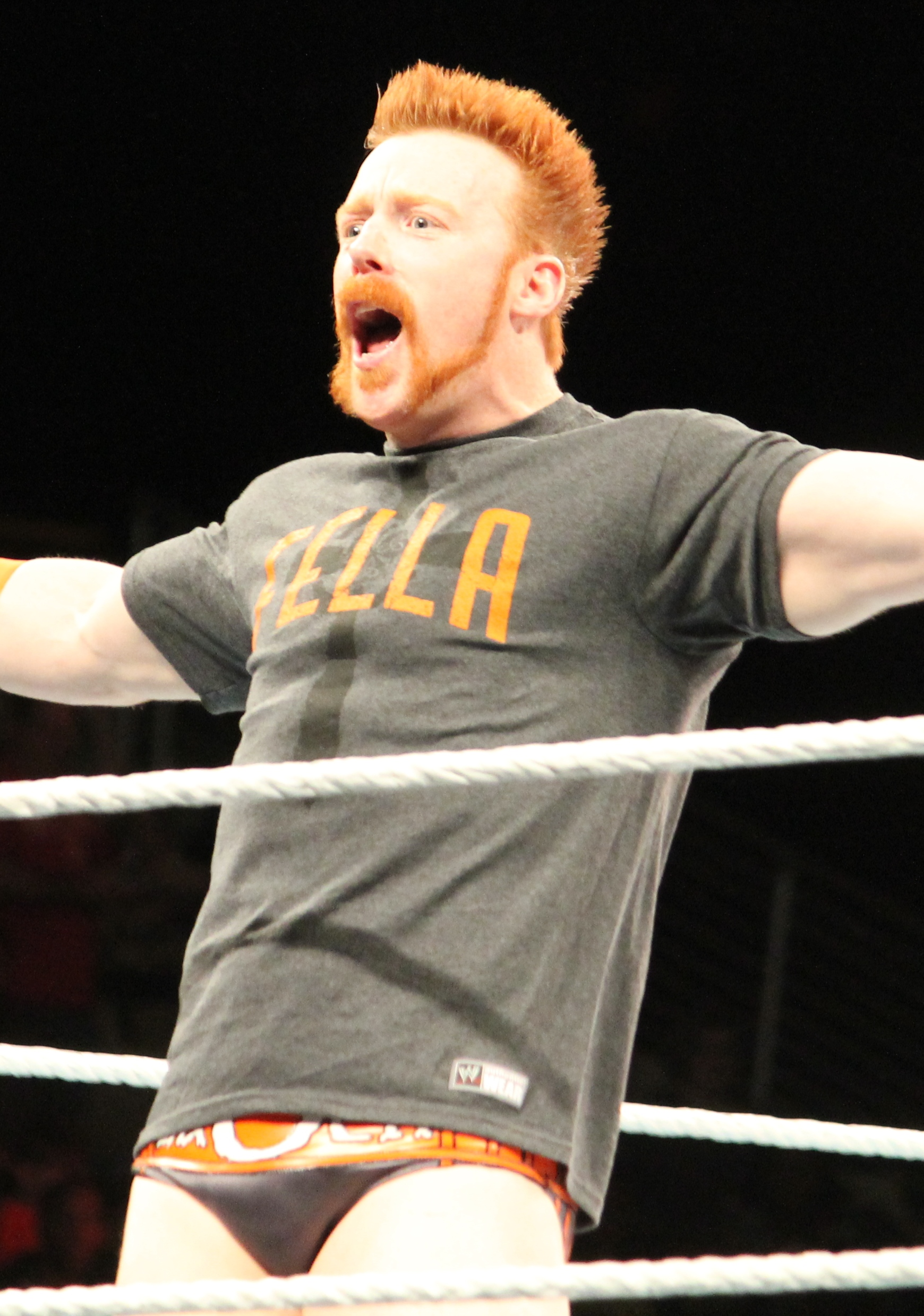
Sheamus

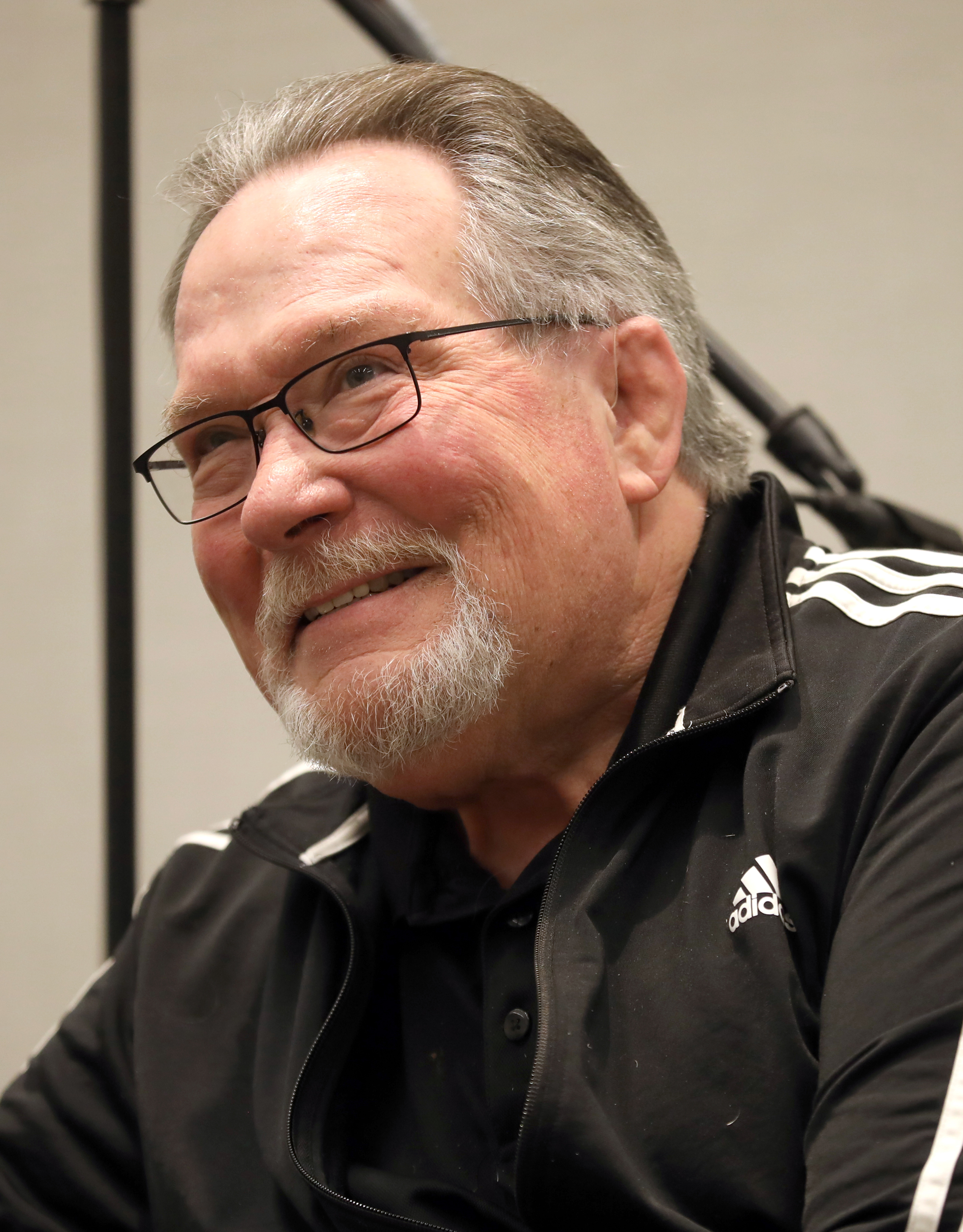
Ted Dibiase

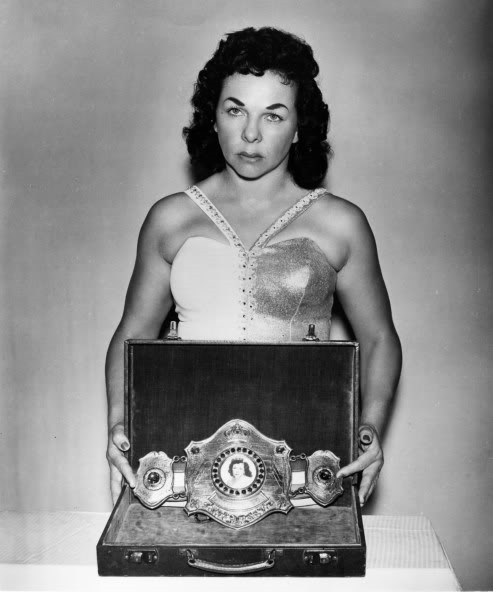
The Fabulous Moolah

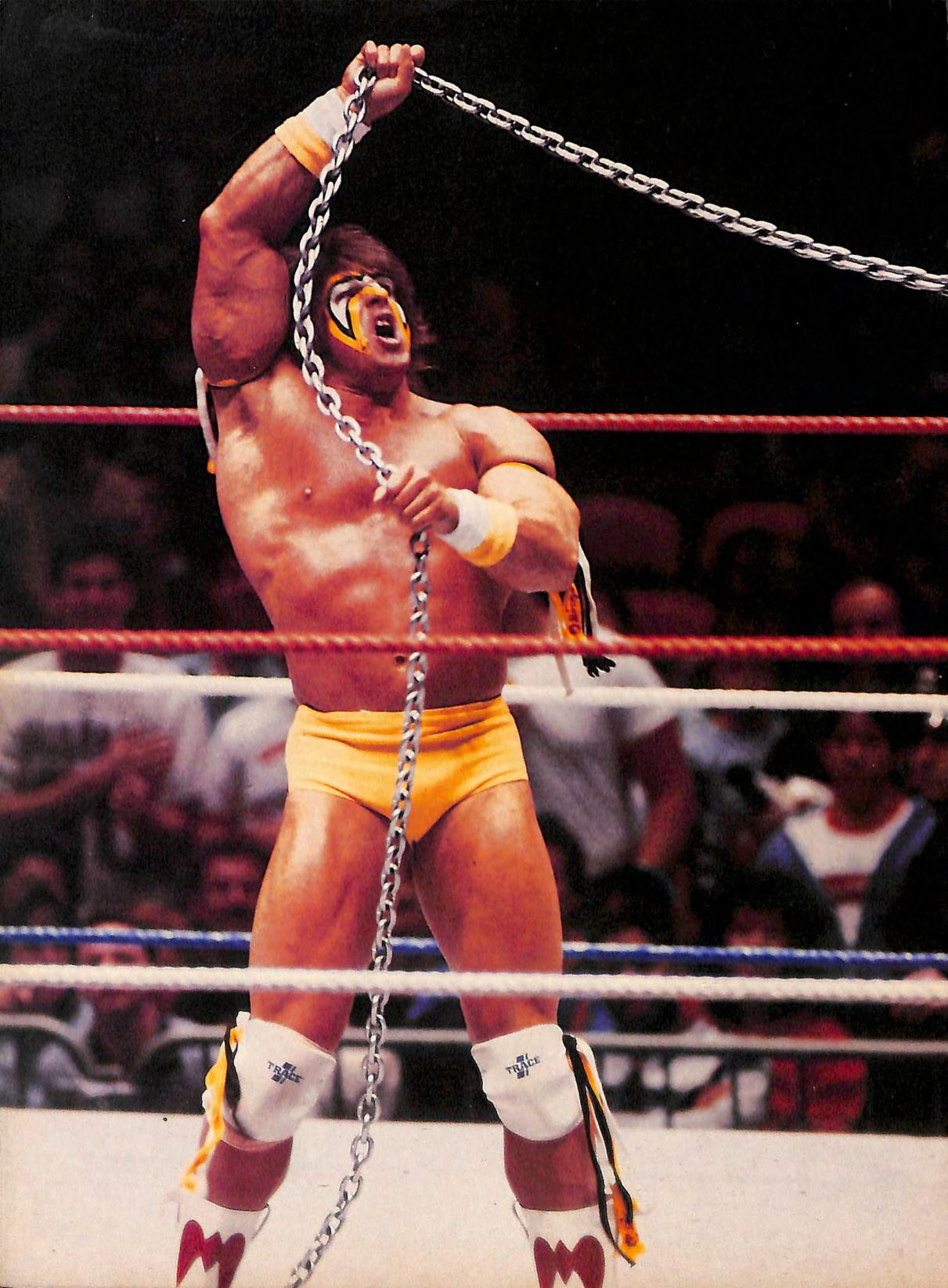
Ultimate Warrior

Key
†	Indicates they are deceased
‡	Indicates they died while they were employed with WWE

Birth name	Ring name(s)	Tenure	Ref
Lou D'Angeli	Sign Guy Dudley	1996; 2006–2010	
Satender Dagar	Jeet Rama	2015–2021	
Ariya Daivari	Ariya Daivari	2016–2021	
Kavita Dalal	Kavita Devi	2017–2021	
William Daley	Billy Silverman	1986–1997; 2001	
Bryan Danielson	Daniel Bryan	2009–2010; 2010–2021	
Tenille Dashwood	Emma	2011–2017; 2022–2023	
Billy Darnell ^{†}	Billy Darnell	1961	
Barry Darsow	Demolition Smash; Repo Man	1987–1993; 2001; 2007	
Daniel Davis	Mr. X Dangerous Danny Davis	1981–1995	
Robert Davis	Bobby Davis	1958–1964	
Joshua Dawkins	Malik Blade	2021–2026	
Tony Dawson	Tony Dawson; Tony Luftman	2012–2013	
Stephanie De Landre	Persia Pirotta	2021–2022	
Ruethann DeBona	Rue DeBona	2003–2004	
Serena Deeb	Serena; Serena Deeb	2009–2010; 2017–2020	
Johnny De Fazio ^{†}	Johnny De Fazio	1962–1984	
Colin Delaney	Colin Delaney	2007–2008	
José Delgado Saldaña	Essa Rios; Mr. Agulia, Aguila; Papi Chulo	1997–2001	
Héctor del Mar	Héctor del Mar	1990–1994; 2006–2010	
William DeMott II	Bill DeMott; Hugh Morrus; Crash the Terminator	1995; 2001–2007; 2011–2015	
Vincent Denigris ^{†}	Argentina Apollo	1963–1968	
Edward Dennis	Eddie Dennis	2018–2022	
Dominic DeNucci ^{†}	Dominic DeNucci	1967–1972; 1974–1982	
Michael DePoli	Antoni Polaski; Roadkill	2005–2008	
Richard Derringer ^{†}	Rick Derringer	1985–1987	
Sunny Dhinsa	Akam; Sunny Dhinsa	2014–2020; 2024–2025	
Amale Dib	Amale	2020–2022	
Theodore DiBiase	Ted DiBiase	1979; 1987–1996	
Theodore DiBiase Jr.	Ted DiBiase Jr. Ted DiBiase	2008–2013	
John DiGiacomo	Jameson	1992	
James J. Dillon	J.J. Dillon	1989–1996	
Kathy Dingman	B.B. Barbara Bush	2000	
Nicholas Dinsmore	Eugene; Nick Dinsmore	1999; 2004–2007; 2009; 2013–2014	
Rebecca DiPietro	Rebecca; Rebecca DiPietro	2006–2007	
Jack Doan	Jack Doan	1991–2013	
Steven Doll ^{†}	Steven Dunn	1993–1995	
Mascarita Dorada	El Torito	2013–2016	
Joseph Dorgan	Johnny Parisi; Joe Dorgan	1995; 2005–2006	
Kara Drew	Cherry; Cherry Pie	2005–2008	
Michael Droese	Duke Droese	1994–1996	
Darren Drozdov ^{†}	Puke; Droz	1998–1999	
James Dudley ^{†}	James Dudley	1960	
James Duggan Jr.	"Hacksaw" Jim Duggan	1987–1993; 2006–2009; 2011–2012	
Jessamyn Duke	Jessamyn Duke	2018–2021	
Amy Dumas	Lita	1999–2006; 2015–2018; 2022–2023	
Michael Durham ^{†}	Johnny Grunge	1999	
Bill Dunn	Bill Dunn	1988–1997	
Dennis Dunn ^{†}	Dennis Dunn	1972–1983	
Kevin Dunn	Kevin Dunn	1984–2023	
Živilė Raudoniené	Aksana	2009–2014	
William Eadie	Demolition Ax; The Masked Superstar; Super Machine; Bolo Mongol	1973; 1983–1984; 1986–1990	
Linda Edwards	Linda McMahon	1980–2009	
Conrad Efraim ^{†}	S. D. Jones; Special Delivery Jones	1974–1988; 1990	
Kevin Egan	Kevin Patrick	2021–2024	
Marty Elias	Marty Elias	2006–2009	
Layla El	Layla	2006–2015	
Adnan El Farthie^{†}	Billy White Wolf; General Adnan	1976–1977; 1990–1991	
Paul Ellering	Paul Ellering	1992; 1998–1999; 2016–2018; 2024–2025	
Mary Ellison ^{‡}	The Fabulous Moolah; The Spider Lady	1955–1987; 1999–2007	
Jonathon Emminger	Lucky Cannon; Johnny Prime	2008–2011	
Chukwusom Enekwechi	Tyriek Igwe	2023–2026	
Michael Enos	Blake Beverly	1991–1993	
Pedro Escobar	Pedro Escobar	1953–early 1960s	
William Ensor ^{†}	Buddy Landel	1995–1996	
Jose Estrada Jr.	Jose Estrada Jr.	1997–1999	
José Estrada Sr.	Jose Estrada	1978–1990	
Kristin Eubanks	Krissy Vaine	2006–2007	
Sidney Eudy ^{†}	Sid; Sid Justice; Sycho Sid	1991–1992; 1995–1997; 2012	
Tyrone Evans	Michael Tarver	2008–2011	
Lance Evers	Lance Storm	2001–2005; 2019–2020	
Aurelio Fabiani ^{†}	Ray Fabiani	1953–1969	
Henry Faggart ^{†}	Jackie Fargo	1957–1961	
Page Falkinburg	Diamond Dallas Page	2001–2002; 2012; 2015; 2016	
James Fanning	Jimmy Valiant	1971–1972; 1973–1975; 1979	
Edward Farhat ^{†}	The Sheik	1958–1961; 1965–1972	
Stephen Farrelly	Sheamus	2006–2026	
Roy Farris	The Honky Tonk Man	1986–1991; 1997–1998; 2001; 2008	
Edward Fatu ^{†}	Jamal; Umaga	1995–1996; 2001–2003; 2005–2009	
Samuel Fatu	The Tonga Kid; Tama	1983–1988	
Solofa Fatu Jr.	Fatu; Rikishi; Rikishi Phatu; The Sultan	1992–1998; 1999–2004	
Raymond Fernandez ^{†}	Hercules; Hercules Hernandez	1985–1992	
Edward Ferrara	Ed Ferrera	1998–1999	
David Ferrier ^{†}	Jimmy Del Ray	1993-1995	
Kevin Fertig	Kevin Thorn; Mordecai; The Vampire; Vengeance; Seven Thorn	2000–2005; 2006–2009	
Brittany Fetkin	Devin Taylor	2013–2015	
Tevita Fifita	Camacho; Tonga Loa	2009–2014; 2024–2026	
Lou Filippelli	Lou Filippelli	1970s–1980s	
Howard Finkel ^{‡}	Howard Finkel; The Fink	1977–2020	
Stephanie Finochio	Trinity	2005–2007	
Jillian Fletcher	Jillian Hall; Jillian	2003–2010	
David Fliehr	David Flair	2001–2002	
Richard Fliehr	Ric Flair	1991–1993; 2002–2009; 2012–2021	
Michael Foley	Jack Foley; Cactus Jack; Mankind; Dude Love; Mick Foley	1986; 1991; 1996–2001; 2003–2008; 2011–2012; 2016–2017; 2018–2025	
Angela Fong	Miss Angela; Savannah	2007–2010	
Kevin Foote	Kevin Kelly	1996–2003	
Chad Fortune	Travis	1995–1996	
Francine Fournier	Francine	2006	
Joe Fowler	Joe Fowler	1993	
Anthony Francis	A. J. Francis; Top Dolla	2020–2023	
Keith Franke Jr. ^{†}	Adrian Adonis	1982–1987	
Edwin Franken	Gary Wilson	2022–2026	
Antione Frazier	Jasper Troy	2023–2026	
Nelson Frazier Jr. ^{†}	Big Daddy V King Mabel; Mabel; Viscera	1993–1996; 1998–2000; 2004–2008	
Stanley Frazier ^{†}	Uncle Elmer	1985-1986	
Karl Fredericks	Eddy Thorpe	2023–2025	
Jeremy Fritz	Eric Young	2016–2020; 2022–2023	
Harry Fujiwara ^{†}	Mr. Fuji	1972–1974; 1977–1978; 1981–1996	
Robert Fuller	Tennessee Lee	1998	
James Fullington	The Sandman	2005–2007	
Dorrance Funk Jr. ^{†}	Dory Funk Jr. Hoss Funk	1986; 1996; 1998–1999	
Terrence Funk ^{†}	Terry Funk; Chainsaw Charlie	1972–1973; 1985–1986; 1997–1998; 2006	
Douglas Furnas ^{†}	Doug Furnas	1996–1997	
Jazzy Gabert	Jazzy Gabert	2017–2018; 2019–2020	
Jean Gagné ^{†}	Frenchy Martin	1987–1990	
Camden Gagnon	Braxton Cole	2025–2026	
Rejean Gagnon	Lumberjack Pierre	1978–1979	
Anthony Gareljich	Tony Garea	1972–2014	
Scott Garland	Scott Taylor; Scotty 2 Hotty	1997–2007; 2016–2021	
Jamara Garrett	Jakara Jackson	2021–2025	
Santana Garrett	Santana Garrett	2019–2021	
Shad Gaspard ^{†}	Da Beast; Shad Gaspard; Shad	2003–2010	
Peter Gasperino	Pete Gas	1999–2001	
Jacquelyn Gayda	Miss Jackie; Jackie Gayda	2002–2005	
Jade Gentile	Jazmyn Nyx	2022–2025	
Terrance Gerin	Rhyno	2001–2005; 2015–2019	
Thomas Gilbert Jr. ^{†}	Eddie Gilbert	1981–1983	
Glenn Gilbertti	Glenn Gilberti	1992	
Duane Gill	Gillberg; Duane Gill; Executioner #1	1992–1994; 1998–2000	
William Gilzenberg ^{‡}	William Glizenberg	1963–1978	
Joy Giovanni	Joy Giovanni	2004–2005	
Gregory Girard	Oscar	1993–1995	
Claude Giroux	Dink the Clown; Little Hulkster; The Macho Midget; Tiger Jackson	1982–1985; 1992–1996	
Lionel Giroux ^{†}	Little Beaver	1963; 1966–1973; 1982–1983; 1985; 1987	
Richard Gland ^{†}	Dick Brower; Bulldog Brower	1966–1967; 1969–1971; 1978–1982	
Nicola Glencross	Nikki Cross; Nikki ASH	2016–2026	
René Goguen	René Duprée	2002–2007	
Jorge González ^{†}	Giant Gonzales	1993	
Eduardo González Hernández	Juventud; Juventud Guerrera	2005–2006	
Jonathan Good	Dean Ambrose	2011–2019	
Luther Goodall ^{†}	Luther Lindsay	1959	
Frank Goodish ^{†}	Bruiser Brody	1976–1977	
Terry Gordy Jr.	Jesse; Slam Master J Jesse Dalton; Ray Geezy	2005–2010	
Terry Gordy ^{†}	The Executioner; Terry Gordy	1984; 1996	
Edward Gossett ^{†}	Eddie Graham	1959–1960; 1964–1965; 1970–1971; 1972	
Zachary Gowen	Zach Gowen	2003–2004	
Derek Graham-Couch	Robbie McAllister	2005–2008	
Jerry Graham ^{†}	Jerry Graham	1953–1963	
George Gray	Akeem; One Man Gang	1987–1990; 2001	
Lionel Green	Lio Rush	2017–2020	
Zachary Green	Nash Carter	2020–2022	
Rena Greek	Sable	1996–1999; 2003–2004	
Barri Griffiths	Mason Ryan	2009–2014	
Victor Grimes	Key	1999	
Todd Grisham	Todd Grisham	2004–2011	
Robert Gronkowski	Rob Gronkowski	2020	
Nidia Guenard	Nidia	2001–2004	
Eduardo Guerrero Llanes ^{‡}	Eddie Guerrero	2000–2001; 2002–2005 ^{‡}	
Héctor Guerrero Llanes	The Gobbledy Gooker	1990; 2001	
Salvador Guerrero III ^{†}	Chavo Classic; Chavo Guerrero Sr.	2004	
Salvador Guerrero IV	Chavo Guerrero; Kerwin White	2001–2011	
Charles Haas II	Charlie Haas	2000–2005; 2006–2010	
Aron Haddad	Aaron Stevens; Damien Mizdow; Damien Sandow; Idol Stevens; Macho Mandow	2002–2007; 2010–2016	
Sean Haire ^{†}	Sean O'Haire	2001–2004	
Donald Hager Jr.	Jack Swagger	2006–2017	
Scott Hall ^{†}	Scott Hall; Razor Ramon	1992–1996; 2002	
Mike Halac ^{†}	Mantaur; Tank; Goldust's bodyguard	1994–1997	
Tony Halme ^{†}	Ludvig Borga; Ludwig Borge	1993–1994	
Rafael Halperin ^{†}	Rafael Halperin	1950s	
Joseph Hamilton Jr.	Nick Patrick	2001–2008	
Andrew Hankinson	Dorian "Deacon" Deville; Festus; Justice Dalton; Kane; Luke Gallows	2005–2010; 2016–2020; 2022–2025	
Thomas Hannifan	Tom Phillips	2012–2021	
Gurjit Hans	Tiger Ali Singh	1997–2002	
Ib Hansen ^{†}	Eric the Red	1970	
John Hansen II	Stan Hansen	1976; 1981	
Robert Fort Hanson ^{†}	Swede Hanson	1979–1980; 1982–1985	
Judy Hardee	Judy Martin	1981–1982; 1985; 1987–1989	
Albert Hardie Jr.	Albert Hardie Jr. Jordan Myles	2019	
Jeffrey Hardy	Jeff Hardy	1994–2003; 2006–2009; 2017–2021	
Matthew Hardy	Matt Hardy; Ingus Jynx	1994–2005; 2005–2010; 2017–2020	
James Harrell	Boris Zhukov	1987–1990	
Brian Harris	Chainz (Fake) Undertaker	1994; 1997–1998	
Christopher Harris	Braden Walker	1996; 2008	
Donald Harris	8-Ball; Don Harris; Jacob Blu; Jared Grimm	1995; 1996; 1997–1999	
Houston Harris ^{†}	Bobo Brazil	1963–1968; 1976–1977; 1984	
James Harris ^{†}	Kamala	1984; 1986–1988; 1992–1993; 2001; 2005; 2006	
Richard Harris ^{†}	Black Bart	1989–1991	
Ronald Harris	Eli Blu; Jason Grimm; Ron Harris; Skull	1995; 1996; 1997–1999	
Bret Hart	Bret "The Hitman" Hart	1984–1997; 2010	
Bruce Hart	Bruce Hart	1993	
James Hart	Jimmy Hart	1985–1993	
Keith Hart	Keith Hart	1993	
Owen Hart ^{‡}	The Blue Blazer; Owen Hart	1988–1989; 1992–1999 ^{‡}	
Joshua Harter	Chris Sabin	2024–2026	
David Harwood	Scott Dawson	2012–2020	
Stokely Hathaway	Malcom Bivens	2019–2022	
Kazuhiro Hayashi	Kaz Hayashi; Shiryu	2001	
Alfred Hayes ^{†}	Lord Alfred Hayes	1982–1995	
Trisa Hayes	Beulah McGillicutty	1997; 2005–2006	
William Haynes III	Billy Jack Haynes	1986–1988	
David Heath	Gangrel; Black Phantom; The Druid	1993–1995; 1998–2001; 2004–2007	
Brian Hebner	Brian Hebner	2000–2006	
David Hebner ^{†}	Dave Hebner	1986–2005	
Earl Hebner	Earl Hebner	1988–2005	
Raymond Heenan ^{†}	Bobby Heenan	1984–1993	
Bobby Lashley	Bobby Lashley	2005–2008; 2018–2024	
Laurence Heffernan ^{†}	Roy Heffernan	1960–1961; 1963–1964; 1967	
Brian Heffron	The Blue Meanie	1998–2000; 2005	
Michael Hegstrand ^{†}	Hawk; Road Warrior Hawk	1990–1992; 1997–1999; 2003	
Jon Heidenreich	Heidenreich	2003–2006	
James Hellwig ^{†}	Ultimate Warrior; Dingo Warrior	1987–1991; 1992; 1996	
Christina Hemme	Christy Hemme	2004–2005	
Xia-Louise Henderson	Xia Brookside	2018–2022	
Curtis Hennig ^{†}	Curt Hennig; Mr. Perfect	1981–1984; 1988–1996; 2002	
Joseph Hennig	Curtis Axel; Joe Hennig; Michael McGillicutty	2007–2020	
Larry Hennig ^{†}	Larry Hennig	1965; 1973–1974	
John Hennigan	John Hennigan; John Morrison; Johnny Blaze; Johnny Nitro; Johnny Spade; Johnny Superstar	2002–2011; 2019–2021	
Mark Henry	Mark Henry; Markswoggle	1996–2021	
Mickie Henson ^{†}	Mickie Henson; Mickey Jay	1992-1993; 2005–2009	
Ronald Herd ^{†}	Ron Bass	1987–1989	
Michael Hettinga	Mike Knox	2005–2010	
Melissa Hiatt	Missy Hyatt	1987	
Dean Higuchi ^{†}	Dean Ho	1973–1975	
Sōjirō Higuchi	Ikemen Jiro	2020–2023	
John Hill ^{†}	Jerry Valiant	1979; 1984–1985	
James Hines	Bobby Fulton	1997	
Joseph Hitchen	Just Joe	2000–2001	
Daniel Hollie	Damaja; Danny Basham	2003–2007	
Bill Goldberg	Goldberg	2003–2004; 2016–2025	
Robert Horne ^{†}	Mo; Sir Mo	1993–1996	
Barry Horowitz	Barry Horowitz; Barry Hart	1979; 1982–1983; 1987–1990; 1992–1997	
Tim Horner	Tim Horner	1988-1989	
Malia Hosaka	Malia Hosaka	1999	
Kairi Housako	Kairi Sane	2017–2021; 2023–2026	
Robert Howard Jr.	Bob Holly; Bombbastic Bob; Hardcore Holly; Thurman "Sparky" Plugg	1994-2009	
Lance Hoyt	Vance Archer	2009–2010	
Jonathan Huber ^{†}	Harper; Luke Harper	2012–2019	
Devon Hughes	Reverend D-Von; D-Von Dudley	1997; 1999–2004; 2015–2023	
Maven Huffman	Maven	2001–2005	
Jonathan Hugger	Johnny Stamboli	2001–2004	
Curtis Hughes	Mr. Hughes	1993; 1997; 1999–2000	
Elizabeth Hulette ^{†}	Miss Elizabeth	1985–1992	
Michael Hutter	Derrick Bateman; EC3	2009–2013; 2018–2020	
Curtis Hussey	Fandango; Johnny Curtis	2006–2021	
Matthew Hyson	Spike Dudley	2001–2005	
Kevin Federline	Kevin Federline	2006–2007	
Floyd Mayweather Jr.	Floyd "Money" Mayweather	2008; 2009	

== See also ==
- List of WWE personnel
