= Good Times with Bad Boys =

Single by Boy Krazy

from the album Boy Krazy
- Released: May 1993
- Recorded: 1991
- Genre: Dance-pop
- Length: 3:09
- Label: Next Plateau, PolyGram
- Songwriter: Stock Aitken & Waterman
- Producer: Stock Aitken & Waterman

Boy Krazy singles chronology
| "All You Have to Do" (1992) | "Good Times with Bad Boys" (1993) |

"Good Times with Bad Boys" is a single by American female pop group Boy Krazy, written and produced by British team Stock Aitken & Waterman. Lead vocals were performed by group members Kimberly Blake and Johnna Cummings.

The song was originally released in February 1992, as the B-side of the group's second single "All You Have to Do". It was later included on their self-titled album, and released as a single in May 1993, as the follow-up to their breakthrough US hit "That's What Love Can Do". The song was not a hit, peaking only at #59 on the US Billboard Hot 100. The single was never released in the UK, but it was issued in some countries of continental Europe and Asia (most notably the Netherlands). The accompanying music video, shot in black and white, features the girls in a boxing gym, hanging with some boxers, and also choreographing the song.

"Good Times with Bad Boys" would become the last release for the group. Johnna Cummings left the band shortly after the release of the single, with the remaining three members disbanding not long after.

In August 2009, the single was released through iTunes on two digital EPs, including never released remixes of the song and other album tracks.

== Formats and track listings ==
CD Single

1. Good Times with Bad Boys (Radio Mix)
2. Good Times with Bad Boys (Jewels & Stone Mix)
3. Just Like a Dream Come True

European CD Single

1. Good Times with Bad Boys (Radio Mix)
2. Just Like a Dream Come True

12" Single

1. Good Times with Bad Boys (Radio Mix)
2. Good Times with Bad Boys (Club Mix)
3. That's What Love Can Do (Safe In The Hands Of Dub)
4. That's What Love Can Do (Gigolo Club)
5. That's What Love Can Do (Man Mad Club)

iTunes EP

1. Good Times with Bad Boys
2. Good Times with Bad Boys (Dave Ford Remix) *
3. Good Times with Bad Boys (Dave Ford 12" Remix) *
4. Good Times with Bad Boys (7" Instrumental) *
5. Good Times with Bad Boys (7" Backing Track) *
6. Good Times with Bad Boys (Dave Ford Instrumental) *
7. Good Times with Bad Boys (Dave Ford Backing Track) *
8. Different Class (Alternative Mix) *
9. Different Class (Instrumental) *
10. Different Class (Backing Track) *

iTunes Remix EP

1. Good Times with Bad Boys (Jewels & Stone Mix)
2. Good Times with Bad Boys (Jewels & Stone Instrumental) *
3. On a Wing and a Prayer (Original Mix)
4. On a Wing and a Prayer (Alternative Mix) *
5. On a Wing and a Prayer (Original Instrumental) *
6. On a Wing and a Prayer (Original Backing Track) *
7. On a Wing and a Prayer (Alternative Instrumental) *
8. On a Wing and a Prayer (Alternative Backing Track) *
9. On a Wing and a Prayer (Album Instrumental) *
10. On a Wing and a Prayer (Album Backing Track) *

== Charts ==
| Chart (1993) | Peak position |
|---|---|
| Canada Top Singles (RPM) | 32 |
| US Billboard Hot 100 | 59 |
| US Top 40 Mainstream (Billboard) | 31 |
| US Cash Box Top 100 | 45 |
