= Pride (surname) =

Pride is an English surname. Notable people with this name include:

- Alfred M. Pride (1897–1988), United States Navy admiral and pioneer naval aviator
- Anne Pride (1942–1990), National Organization for Women activist
- Charley Pride (1934–2020), American country music singer
- Curtis Pride (born 1968), American baseball player
- Dickie Pride (1941–1969), British rock and roll singer
- Dicky Pride (born 1969), American professional golfer
- Felicia Pride (born 1979), American entrepreneur
- John Pride (c. 1737–1794), American politician from Virginia
- Lou Pride (1944–2012), American blues and soul singer and songwriter
- Lynn Pride (born 1978), American professional basketball
- Mack Pride (1932–2018), American baseball player
- Maria Pride (born 1970), Welsh television actress
- Mary Pride (born 1955), American author and magazine producer
- Michaele Pride-Wells (born 1956), American architect and educator
- Mike Pride (musician), American musician
- Mike Pride (writer) (1946–2023), American writer
- Nick Pride, British musician
- Nicole Pride, American academic administrator
- Thomas Pride (died 1658), Parliamentarian general of the English Civil War
- Thomas Pride (cricketer) (1864–1919), English cricketer
- Thomas Pride (VC) (1835–1893), English soldier
- Toriano Pride Jr. (born 2003), American football player
- Troy Pride (born 1998), American football player
- Wayne Pride, Australian country music and memory lane musician

== Fictional characters ==
- Dwayne Cassius Pride, the main character in the American TV series NCIS: New Orleans
- Woody Pride, the main character in the American film series Toy Story

== See also ==
- Pryde
