= Unbroke =

Studio album by Sara Evans
- Released: June 7, 2024
- Studio: Sound Emporium (Nashville, Tennessee)
- Genre: Country
- Length: 41:59
- Label: Melody Place; Born to Fly
- Producer: Sara Evans; Jeff Trott

Sara Evans chronology
Copy That (2020)	Unbroke (2024)

Singles from Unbroke
- 1. "Pride" Released: March 21, 2024

Unbroke is the eleventh studio album by American country artist Sara Evans. It was released on June 7, 2024, by Melody Place Records and Evans's own Born to Fly record label. The 11-track album chronicles her separation from husband Jay Barker and their reunification. The songs on the album were mostly written by Evans and were co-produced with Jeff Trott. It was preceded by the release of the lead single "Pride" on March 21, 2024.

== Background ==
During the 2000s, Sara Evans found commercial success recording both country ballads and uptempo love songs. Five of her singles topped the country charts, including "Suds in the Bucket" (2004), "A Real Fine Place to Start" (2005) and "A Little Bit Stronger" (2011). In 2015, she left her long time label, RCA Records, and founded her own recording company. Evans has released two more studio albums independently since her departure. In 2023, it was announced that she signed a new contract with Melody Place Records and that her next album would be released through the label. During this time, Evans and her husband Jay Barker separated. He was then arrested after an incident involving the couple and their daughter in 2022. Evans then filed for divorce but ultimately reunited with Barker after the couple underwent counseling services. During this period, she began writing "really sad songs" about her difficulties with Barker. Ultimately, Evans chose to record an album that centered on the couple's separation and reunification.

== Recording and content ==
Unbroke was recorded at Sound Emporium, a studio located in Nashville, Tennessee. The project was co-produced by Evans and Jeff Trott. Known for his production work with Sheryl Crow and Stevie Nicks, Jeff Trott was sought out by Evans. The two met at Trott's home where they unpacked her personal challenges and started writing songs. Evans believed that Trott "really understood" her "vision for the project" and decided he would serve as her co-producer.

Unbroke consists of 11 tracks, ten of which were co-written by Evans. The album's songs were described by Billboard as having "traditional country lyricism" that resembled George Jones or Tammy Wynette. Evans described the album's concept as going "from break down to breakthrough". The songs discuss that challenging feelings she had and ends with her reconciliation with Barker. The opening track "Pride" was written following Barker was arrested and her feelings surrounding the incident. The second track "21 Days" is an uptempo song that was inspired by a conversation Evans had with her therapist about separating from Barker. "A relationship can be a habit, or you can take 21 days and start a good habit like running every day," she told Woman's World. The third track "Mask" described the emotional abuse Evans faced with Barker.

The fourth track, "Cleaning Out Your Closet", was described by Evans as being about the damage alcoholism can have on others. In the ninth track, "Better Than This", Evans explores the lighter times of her marriage to Barker. On the title track, Evans explained that the song has "a double meaning" because it is about the "generational trauma" people bring into relationships but also about how her relationship with Barker has ended "in a good place". The final track "Gypsy Ways" describes being away from a partner.

== Release, promotion and singles ==
Unbroke was preceded by the release of the album's lead single "Pride". The song was released on March 21, 2024. "Pride" debuted (and peaked) at number 60 on the Billboard Canada Country chart week dated April 13, 2024, becoming Evans' first single to chart there since "Slow Me Down". The same day of the song's release also saw the debut of Evans' podcast called Diving in Deep with Sara Evans. A music video for "Pride" premiered on March 27. Unbroke was then released on June 7, 2024, by Melody Place Records, in conjunction with Evans's Born to Fly imprint. It was distributed as both a compact disc and a vinyl LP. It was also released to digital platforms, which includes Apple Music.

== Track listing ==
Unbroke (CD, LP and digital versions)
No.	Title	Writer(s)	Length
1.	"Pride"	Sara Evans; Madi Diaz; Sean McConnell	3:40
2.	"21 Days"	Evans; Melissa Fuller; Jeff Trott	3:46
3.	"Mask"	Evans; Chris DeStefano; Emily Shackleton	3:29
4.	"Cleaning Out Your Closet"	Evans; Alex Kline; Allison Veltz Cruz	3:34
5.	"Heartless"	Evans; Ashley Monroe; Andrew Paul Petroff; Trott	4:09
6.	"Downfall"	Evans; McConnell; Trott	4:03
7.	"I Wanna Be Wrong"	Evans; Karyn Rochelle	4:04
8.	"Sorry Now"	Evans; Rochelle; Shane Stevens	3:29
9.	"Better Than This"	Marc Beeson; Sara Haze; Daniel Tashian	3:56
10.	"Unbroke"	Evans; Ryan Beaver; Adam Hambrick	4:59
11.	"Gypsy Ways"	Evans; Fuller; Trott	2:45
Total length:			41:59

== Personnel ==
All credits are adapted from the liner notes of Unbroke.

Musical personnel

- Jazz Davis – vocal harmony
- Fred Eltringham – drums
- Avery Evans – electric guitar
- Olivia Evans – vocal harmony
- Sara Evans – lead vocals, vocal harmony
- Todd Lombardo – acoustic guitar, mandolin
- Billy McClaran – fiddle
- Chris McHugh – drums
- Rob McNelley – twelve-string guitar, baritone guitar, electric guitar
- Russ Pahl – banjo, pedal steel guitar
- Phil Towns – flute, electric piano, hammond B3 organ, keyboards, strings, Wurlitzer electronic piano
- Jeff Trott – acoustic guitar, dobro, Moog synthesizer, strings, Wurlitzer electronic piano
- Craig Young – bass

Technical personnel

- Sara Evans – producer
- Justin Francis – engineering, mixing, percussion
- Pete Lyman – mastering
- Buckley Miller – engineer
- Mike Moore – design
- David Paulin – assistant
- Jordan Reed – engineer
- Leigh Shockey – executive producer
- Jeff Trot – producer

== Release history ==
Region	Date	Format	Label	Ref.
North America	June 7, 2024	Compact disc; vinyl LP; music download; streaming	Born to Fly Records; Melody Place Records	
Brazil	June 7, 2024	Music download; streaming	Born to Fly Records; Melody Place Records	
France	June 7, 2024	Music download; streaming	Born to Fly Records; Melody Place Records	
Mexico	June 7, 2024	Music download; streaming	Born to Fly Records; Melody Place Records	
