= Boy Krazy (album) =

Studio album by Boy Krazy
- Released: February 23, 1993
- Recorded: 1991
- Studios: PWL (London, England)
- Genres: Pop; dance-pop; synthpop
- Length: 33:27
- Labels: Next Plateau; London; PolyGram
- Producer: Stock Aitken Waterman

Singles from Boy Krazy
- 1. "That's What Love Can Do" Released: July 15, 1991; 2. "All You Have to Do" Released: February 1992; 3. "Good Times with Bad Boys" Released: May 1993

Boy Krazy is the only album by girl group Boy Krazy, released on February 23, 1993. It was produced by Mike Stock and Pete Waterman, except "That's What Love Can Do" and "Good Times with Bad Boys", which are a Stock Aitken Waterman production. Each member of the group sings the lead vocals on at least two songs on the album, which includes many tracks written for Kylie Minogue had she stayed on Stock Aitken Waterman's PWL label. The album includes their biggest hit "That's What Love Can Do", as well as the singles "All You Have to Do" and "Good Times with Bad Boys". A planned fourth single, "Love is a Freaky Thing", was never released as Johnna Cummings left the group in late 1993.

== Album release ==
The album was released in North America first, and then throughout Europe and Asia. The American releases feature a guitar-driven version of the track "On a Wing and a Prayer", whereas the European and Asian releases feature a mix more similar to Stock Aitken Waterman's typical Europop. Two of the tracks on the album, "That Kinda Love" and "Love Is a Freaky Thing", had been previously recorded by R&B group The Cool Notes, who worked with Stock & Waterman in 1991, but their versions were never released at the time. The latter was released through iTunes in 2009. "One Thing Leads to Another" had previously been released in 1990 by pop duo Yell!.

In August 2009, Boy Krazy's back catalogue was reissued through iTunes, including three songs recorded for the album but never released: "Exception to the Rule", "I'll Never Get Another Chance Like This", and "Don't Wanna Let You Go". Also issued were a host of unreleased remixes, including commissioned mixes for the never released fourth single "Love Is a Freaky Thing".

== Track listing ==
All tracks written by Mike Stock, Matt Aitken and Pete Waterman, except where noted.

Original release
No.	Title	Writer(s)	Lead vocals	Length
1.	"That's What Love Can Do" (1993 Radio Mix)		Johnna Cummings	3:22
2.	"That Kinda Love"	Stock; Waterman	Kimberly Blake	3:10
3.	"On a Wing and a Prayer"		Kimberly Blake	3:43
4.	"Different Class"	Stock; Waterman	Josselyne Jones and Kimberly Blake	3:14
5.	"Good Times with Bad Boys"		Kimberly Blake and Johnna Cummings	3:10
6.	"Just Like a Dream Come True"		Ruth Ann Roberts	3:28
7.	"Love Is a Freaky Thing"	Stock; Waterman	Josselyne Jones	3:27
8.	"All You Have to Do"	Stock; Waterman	Johnna Cummings; additional vocals by Josselyne Jones, Kimberly Blake and Ruth Ann Roberts	3:12
9.	"One Thing Leads to Another" (1993 version)		Johnna Cummings, Kimberly Blake, Ruth Ann Roberts and Josselyne Jones	3:12
10.	"Who Could Ask for Anything More"		Ruth Ann Roberts	3:11

2010 Cherry Pop CD re-release
No.	Title	Writer(s)	Lead vocals	Length
1.	"That's What Love Can Do" (1991 Single Mix)		Johnna Cummings	3:15
2.	"That Kinda Love"	Stock; Waterman	Kimberly Blake	3:10
3.	"On a Wing and a Prayer" (European Version)		Kimberly Blake	3:55
4.	"Different Class" (Alternative Mix)	Stock; Waterman	Josselyne Jones and Kimberly Blake	3:45
5.	"Good Times with Bad Boys"		Kimberly Blake and Johnna Cummings	3:10
6.	"Just Like a Dream Come True"		Ruth Ann Roberts	3:28
7.	"Love Is a Freaky Thing"	Stock; Waterman	Josselyne Jones	3:27
8.	"All You Have to Do"	Stock; Waterman	Johnna Cummings; additional vocals by Josselyne Jones, Kimberly Blake and Ruth Ann Roberts	3:12
9.	"One Thing Leads to Another" (1993 version)		Johnna Cummings, Kimberly Blake, Ruth Ann Roberts and Josselyne Jones	3:12
10.	"Who Could Ask for Anything More?"		Ruth Ann Roberts	3:11

Bonus tracks
No.	Title	Writer(s)	Lead vocals	Length
11.	"Exception to the Rule"		Josselyne Jones and Kimberly Blake	2:57
12.	"I'll Never Get Another Chance Like This"		Ruth Ann Roberts	2:56
13.	"That's What Love Can Do" (Extended Version)		Johnna Cummings	7:13
14.	"All You Have to Do" (Extended Version)	Stock; Waterman	Johnna Cummings; additional vocals by Josselyne Jones, Kimberly Blake and Ruth Ann Roberts	7:22
15.	"Good Times with Bad Boys" (Dave Ford 12" Mix)		Kimberly Blake and Johnna Cummings	5:04
16.	"Love Is a Freaky Thing" (Lurve Dog 12" Mix)	Stock; Waterman	Josselyne Jones	4:31
17.	"On a Wing and a Prayer" (Original Mix – USA Version)		Kimberly Blake	3:46
18.	"Just Like a Dream Come True" (Original Mix)		Ruth Ann Roberts	3:27
19.	"Who Could Ask for Anything More?" (Original Version)		Renée Veneziale	3:10
20.	"That's What Love Can Do" (Original Mix)		Johnna Cummings	3:27

== Personnel ==
Adapted from the album's liner notes (original US version).

Musicians

- Mike Stock
- Matt Aitken
- Julian Gingell
- Gary Miller
- Barry Stone
- Asha
- Dave Ford
- A. Linn

Backing vocalists

- Boy Krazy (Kimberly Blake, Johnna Lee Cummings, Josselyne Jones, Ruth Ann Roberts)
- Mike Stock
- Renée Veneziale
- Lance Ellington
- Cleveland Watkiss
- Leroy Osbourne
- Mae McKenna
- Miriam Stockley
- Linda Taylor

Technical

- Pete Day – engineer
- Dave Ford – engineer, mixing
- Tony King – engineer
- Jason Barron – assistant engineer
- Gordon Dennis – assistant engineer
- Dillon Gallagher – assistant engineer
- Jesse Hanbury – assistant engineer
- Chris McDonnell – assistant engineer
- Dean Murphy – assistant engineer
- Martin Neary – assistant engineer
- Les Sharma – assistant engineer
- Paul Waterman – assistant engineer
- Phil Harding – mixing
- Phil Austin – mastering
- Recorded at PWL (London, England)
- Alwyn Coates – photography
- Jeff Faville – design
- Jenniene Leclercq – art direction
- Shazza – styling
- Katya Thomas – make-up
- Lino – hair
