= All You Have to Do =

Single by Boy Krazy

from the album Boy Krazy
- Released: 1992
- Recorded: 1991
- Genre: Pop/Dance
- Length: 3:11
- Label: Next Plateau, PolyGram
- Songwriter: Stock/Waterman
- Producers: Mike Stock, Pete Waterman

Boy Krazy singles chronology
"That's What Love Can Do" (1991)	"All You Have to Do" (1992)	"Good Times with Bad Boys" (1993)

"All You Have to Do" is a single by American female pop group Boy Krazy, written and produced by Mike Stock and Pete Waterman. Lead vocals were performed by group member Johnna Cummings, with additional lead vocals in the chorus by Josselyne Jones.

Released in February 1992, this was Boy Krazy's first single as a quartet, after Renee Veneziale left the band in 1991. The song was not a hit for the group, only peaking at #91 in the UK singles chart. The fact that this single was only released on vinyl and not as a CD single may have hindered a bigger success, as the British public were switching to a CD format at the time. The song was later included on the group's debut album in 1993.

The B-side to this single was "Good Times with Bad Boys" which was released as a single on its own in 1993.

In August 2009, the single was released through iTunes as a digital EP, including never released remixes of the song and other album tracks.

== Charts ==
Chart (1992)	Peak position
UK Singles Chart	91

== Formats and track listings ==
7" Single

1. All You Have To Do
2. Good Times With Bad Boys

12" Single

1. All You Have To Do (12" Version)
2. Good Times With Bad Boys
3. All You Have To Do (Instrumental)

iTunes EP

1. All You Have To Do
2. All You Have To Do (Extended Version)
3. All You Have To Do (Instrumental)
4. All You Have To Do (Backing Track) *
5. Don't Wanna Let You Go *
6. Don't Wanna Let You Go (Instrumental) *
7. Who Could Ask For Anything More? (Original Version) *
8. Who Could Ask For Anything More? (Original Instrumental) *
9. Who Could Ask For Anything More? (Original Backing Track) *
10. Who Could Ask For Anything More? (Album Instrumental) *
11. Who Could Ask For Anything More? (Album Backing Track) *
