= Pride (Sara Evans song) =

Single by Sara Evans

from the album Unbroke
- Released: March 21, 2024
- Genre: Country
- Length: 3:42
- Label: Melody Place; Born to Fly
- Songwriters: Madi Diaz; Sara Evans; Sean McConnell
- Producers: Sara Evans; Jeff Trott

Sara Evans singles chronology
| "Long Way Down" (2018) | "Pride" (2024) |

"Pride" is a song by American country music singer Sara Evans. It was released on March 21, 2024, as the lead single to her eleventh studio album, Unbroke. Evans co-wrote the track with Madi Diaz and Sean McConnell, and co-produced it with Jeff Trott.

== Content ==
Sara Evans wrote "Pride" with Madi Diaz and Sean McConnell. It marked her first release via a partnership with Melody Place Records and the singer's own Born to Fly imprint. Evans describes the song as the "centerpiece" for Unbroke, an album that chronicles recent events in her personal life from the beginning of spousal abuse to the reconciliation of her marriage and the couple restarting their lives together, as it "details the early days of the couple's relationship turmoil". It was written shortly after a January 2022 altercation with her husband Jay Barker, whom she had been separated from since April 2021 and had filed for divorce from in August 2021.

In a March 2024 interview, Evans stated that the couple had reconciled and are now living together again. As a result, Evans contemplated changing the perspective of "Pride" from first-person to third-person following the couple's reconciliation, but Barker encouraged her to keep the song as is because it was her story to tell.

== Music video ==
The music video for "Pride" premiered on March 27, 2024, and stars Evans' daughter Audrey Evans.

== Chart performance ==
"Pride" debuted at number 60 on the Billboard Canada Country chart dated April 13, 2024, becoming Evans' first single to chart there since "Slow Me Down".

| Chart (2024) | Peak position |
|---|---|
| Canada Country (Billboard) | 60 |
