= Seabulk Pride =

Coordinates: 60°41.46′N 151°24.191′W

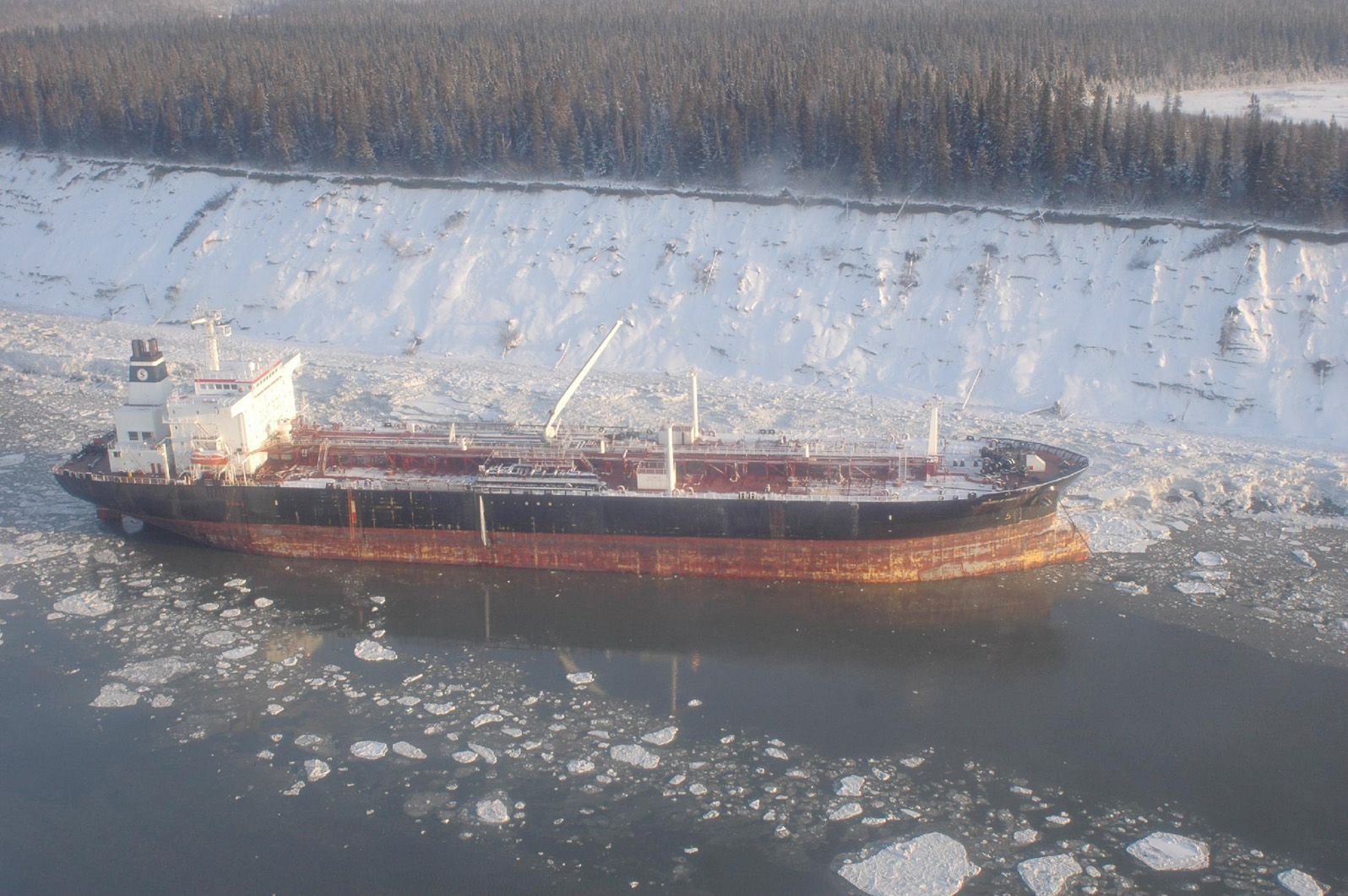
- Seabulk Pride aground

History
- Operator: Seabulk Tankers
- Port of registry: US
- Builder: Newport News Shipbuilding
- Launched: 21 June 1997
- Identification: IMO number: 9118630

General characteristics
- Tonnage: 30,415 GT, 46,094 DWT
- Length: 183 m (600 ft)
- Beam: 32 m (105 ft)
- Speed: 7.5 knots (13.9 km/h; 8.6 mph)

Seabulk Pride, operated by Seabulk Tankers of Ft. Lauderdale, Florida, is a double-hulled oil tanker constructed in 1998 at Newport News Shipbuilding in Virginia. She was built as part of a series of new double hulled tankers serving the domestic market.

Seabulk Pride ran aground near the port of Nikiski, Alaska on February 2, 2006. The tanker had been moored at the Nikiski docks when she was struck by an ice floe that parted her mooring lines. Seabulk Pride - and her cargo of 5 million US gallons (120,000 bbl) of oil - drifted northward up Cook Inlet, where she ran aground. She was refloated the next day, February 3, 2006, with no significant oil release.

On January 9, 2007 Seabulk Pride experienced difficulty at the same dock when extremely icy conditions once again pulled her from her mooring; however, she was able to depart for open water. Subsequent to these two incidents, a tug was assigned to assist vessels at the hazardous port, which has a high tidal range and fast current in addition to being subject to unpredictable heavy icing conditions.
