= Wayne Pride =

Australian country music and memory lane musician (born 1943)

Background information
- Born: 29 June 1943 (age 82)
- Origin: Sydney, New South Wales, Australia
- Genres: country
- Occupation: musician
- Instruments: vocals, guitar
- Years active: 1959–present
- Website: Official website

Wayne Pride (born 29 June 1943) is an Australian country music and memory lane musician, who started his career in 1959 as a vocalist and guitarist in Sydney, Australia.

== Biography ==
Wayne Pride was born on 29 June 1943 and started his musical career in Sydney in 1959. Since 1964, Pride has idolised US country artist, Roger Miller, he worked with Miller's brothers Duane and Wendell to create a tribute show. He has written a book, Three Little Boys on the brothers. He performed the tribute show, Hero, from November 2009. He won the 'Best Entertainer' category at the Western Australian Country Music Awards in 1986, 1989 and 1991.

== Discography ==
Year	Title	Single	Other notes
1989	On the Road		
2006	Memory Lane		Re-Release (Digitally Re-mastered)
2006	Back in Time		
2006	Dream		
