= Pryde =

Pryde is an obsolete spelling of the English word pride now most frequently encountered as a surname.

Notable people with the name include:

- Bob Pryde (1913–98), Scottish soccer player
- David Pryde (footballer) (1913–87), Scottish soccer player
- David Johnstone Pryde (1890–1959), Scottish Labour politician
- Duncan Pryde (1937–97), Canadian hunter, trapper, lexicographer and politician
- James Pryde (1866–1941), Scottish artist working mainly in graphics
- Josephine Pryde (born 1967), English artist
- Mabel Pryde (1871–1918), Scots-born English artist
- Peggy Pryde (1867–1943), British music hall performer
- Susy Pryde (born 1973), New Zealand cyclist

== Business ==
- Neil Pryde Ltd (Pryde Group), Company designing water sport equipment

== Fictional ==
- Kitty Pryde, otherwise Katherine Pryde, Marvel Comics Superhero
- Allegiant General Pryde, Star Wars First Order character

== See also ==
- Pride (surname)
- Pryde Henry Teves, Filipino politician
