= Boy Krazy =

American vocal group (1991–1993)

- Origin: New York City, U.S.
- Genres: Pop, dance-pop
- Years active: 1991–1993
- Label: Next Plateau
- Past members: Kimberly Blake; Johnna Lee Cummings; Josselyne Jones; Ruth Ann Roberts; Renee Veneziale

Boy Krazy was a New York City-based girl group that saw brief fame in 1991, and again in 1993 with their hit single "That's What Love Can Do".

== Career ==
The group was put together through auditions by a management company in New York. Boy Krazy featured female singers Kimberly Blake, Josselyne Jones, Johnna Lee Cummings, Renée Veneziale, and Ruth Ann Roberts (a former Miss Junior America). Their signature pop song "That's What Love Can Do", written and produced by British mega music trio Stock Aitken Waterman, was released in 1991, but it failed to become a hit. Shortly after the release of the single, Veneziale left the band.

Carrying on as a foursome, the group released their second single "All You Have to Do" in 1992, but it also failed to chart. That same year, "That's What Love Can Do" started gaining success in clubs and discothèques across America and substantial airplay on radio stations. The song was remixed and re-released, becoming a hit in the US where it peaked at #18 on the Billboard Hot 100 in February and March 1993. It also reached #1 in pop airplay on the Radio & Records CHR/Pop chart. In the liner notes from their self-titled album the group credited KQKS/Denver, Colorado, for breaking the song after one of the staffers played a remixed version of the track in December 1992.

The album Boy Krazy was released in 1993, and also included the follow-up single "Good Times with Bad Boys", which also hit the Billboard Hot 100. Each member sings the lead vocals on at least two songs on the album, which includes many tracks written for Kylie Minogue had Minogue stayed on Stock Aitken Waterman's PWL label.

Main lead singer Cummings left the band in late 1993. The remaining members tried to develop a new album unsuccessfully and the group split shortly after. Additionally, they were supposed to release "Love Is a Freaky Thing" as their fourth single, but it was never released.

== Recent projects ==
After the group's demise, Ruth Ann Roberts switched careers and has become well known in the professional wrestling community. Now using her real name, Rue DeBona, she co-hosted WWE's After Burn from 2003 to 2004. She married former co-host, Josh Matthews in 2006, but they divorced in 2008.

From there, she moved to Ion Television, and hosted the short-lived Firebrand, an attempt at commercials-as-content website and TV show.

Cummings pursued a solo career, but it was unsuccessful. In July 2007, Portland, Oregon-based filmmaker Kimberly Craig posted Expect Less, a short documentary featuring Cummings on YouTube. In it, Cummings discusses her life since the hey-day of Boy Krazy.

Josselyne Jones (now known as Josselyne Herman-Saccio) is now a producer and agent, founding Josselyne Herman & Associates in New York City. She is also a coach for the Landmark (Forum) and Landmark's Advance Course.

Renee Veneziale sang with different bands, among them Fig, Delux and RnR. She has also worked as a theater actress, and is now a yoga teacher.

In August 2009, Boy Krazy's back catalogue was reissued through iTunes, including three songs recorded for the album but never released: "Exception to the Rule", "I'll Never Get Another Chance Like This", and "Don't Wanna Let You Go". Also issued were a host of unreleased remixes, including commissioned mixes for the never released fourth single "Love Is a Freaky Thing".

== Discography ==
Albums

- Boy Krazy (1993)

Singles

- "That's What Love Can Do" (1991) UK #86
- "All You Have to Do" (1992) UK #91
- "That's What Love Can Do" (house remix) (1993) UK #80, US Hot 100 #18, US Adult Contemporary #19, Australia (ARIA) #124, Canada #7
- "Good Times with Bad Boys" (1993) US #59, Canada #32
