= Personal Responsibility in a Desirable Environment =

US nonprofit organization

- Formation: 1997
- Members: 387,818
- Executive Officer and President: Karen Kelly
- Vice President, Chief Operating Officer and Chief Financial Officer: Tammie Wilson

Personal Responsibility in a Desirable Environment (PRIDE) is a non-profit organization that links citizens with the resources of local, state, and federal agencies to improve the region's water quality, clean up solid waste problems, and advance environmental education. It was originally launched by Congressman Hal Rogers and General James Bickford in 1997 and is a statewide non-profit organization in Kentucky.

== Mission ==
The PRIDE mission is to improve the native region by encouraging citizens to contribute and take responsibility for protecting the environment and to help provide the education and resources needed to do so.

== Outings ==
The annual P.R.I.D.E. Spring Cleanup is held the entire month of April and PRIDE works with communities during the month of April to create a clean and healthy environment in time for the upcoming recreation and tourism season, and local P.R.I.D.E. (Personal Responsibility in a Desirable Environment) committees meet monthly to plan events every year. Officials say it is a chance for folks to get out and improve their communities. The Kentucky P.R.I.D.E. reported online that nearly 10,600 volunteers have picked up nearly 62,000 bags of trash and eliminated 416 illegal dumps in Pike County, more than 4,000 volunteers have picked up 5,318 bags of trash and eliminated 11 illegal dumps in Letcher County and nearly 8,700 volunteers have picked up nearly 24,000 bags of trash and eliminated 29 dumps in Floyd County and fourteen volunteers cleaned along Rts. 2566, 2565 and 3 in Lawrence County, collecting 44 bags of trash and two tires along 5.4 miles of roadway. Also more than 150 people gathered recently in Corbin to discuss expanding recycling in southern and Eastern Kentucky. Not only volunteers contribute to this cleanup, families from communities contribute without even realizing it because of their own spring cleanup habits.

The Pike County Clean Community Board who cooperate with the PRIDE organization helps in educational outreach program. The program, also sponsored by the Pike County Board of Education and funded through Litter Abatement funds, sends a representative to local schools to educate children about becoming litter free. The board will also emphasize recycling efforts in the county. Pike County Solid Waste officials reported that the county's recycling program diverted more than 450 tons of garbage from the landfill last year. More than half of the diverted material—254 tons—was cardboard. Approximately 158 tons of newspaper, 23 tons of mixed paper, 14 tons of plastic, three tons of phone books and one ton of white paper were also recycled instead of filling up the landfill.
