= Josh Mathews =

American professional wrestler (born 1980)

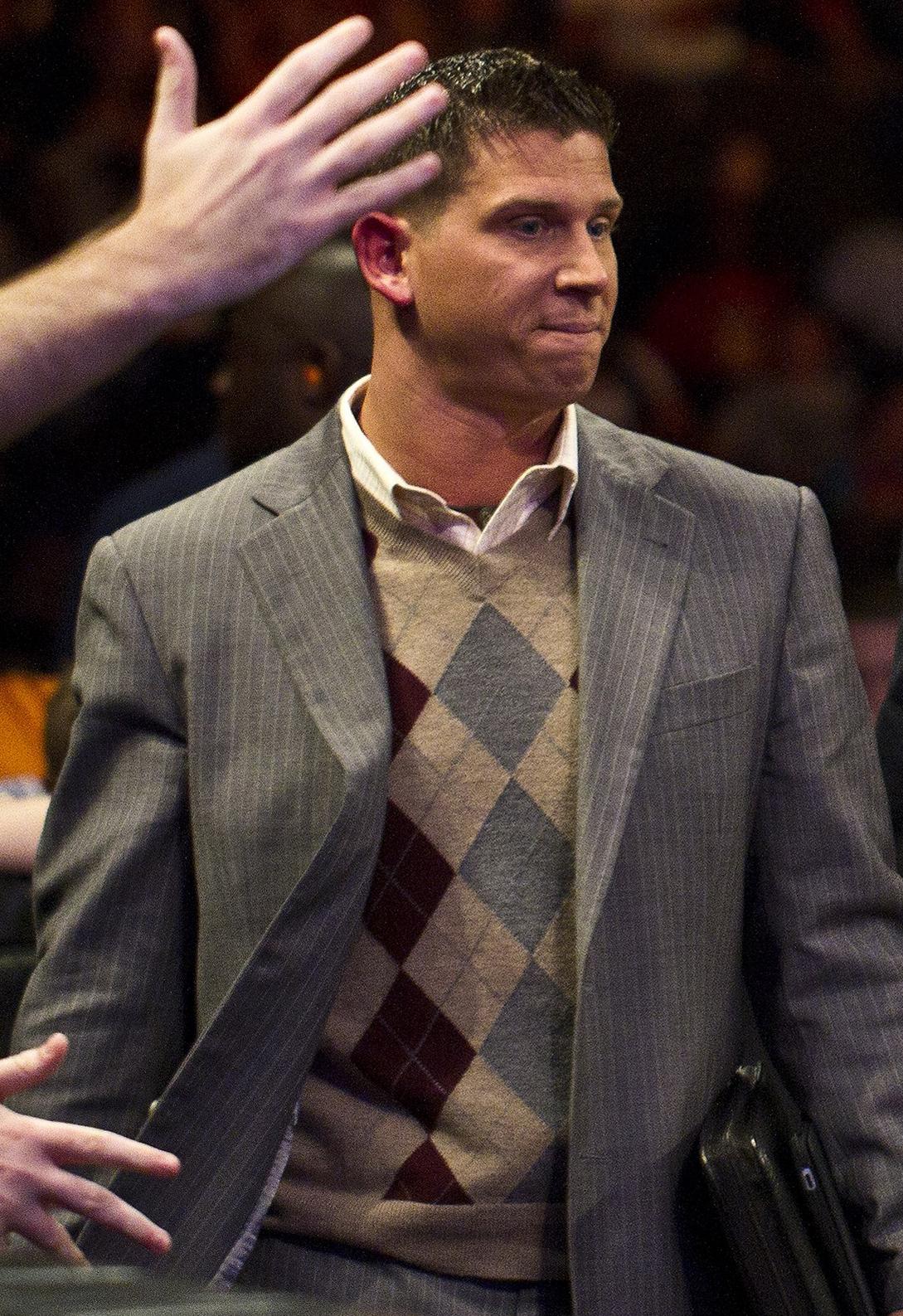
- Mathews in 2010

Personal information
- Born: Joshua Matthew Lomberger; November 25, 1980 (age 45) Griffith, Indiana, U.S.
- Spouses: Rue DeBona (m. 2006; div. 2008) Madison Rayne (m. 2015)

Professional wrestling career
- Ring name: Josh Mathews
- Billed height: 5 ft 9 in (1.75 m)
- Billed weight: 143 lb (65 kg)
- Billed from: Sea Isle City, New Jersey
- Trained by: Al Snow; Ivory; Tazz
- Debut: 2001

Joshua Matthew Lomberger (born November 25, 1980), better known by the ring name Josh Mathews, is an American professional wrestling producer, former play by play commentator, and former professional wrestler. He is signed to All Elite Wrestling (AEW) as a producer. He is best known for his time in Total Nonstop Action Wrestling (TNA) and WWE.

== Professional wrestling career ==
=== World Wrestling Federation / Entertainment / WWE (2001–2014) ===
==== Tough Enough and backstage interviewer (2001–2006) ====
Lomberger was a runner-up to Maven and Nidia in the first WWE Tough Enough in 2001.

Lomberger was eventually hired by World Wrestling Entertainment (WWE), and began using the name Josh Mathews. In December 2002, he began appearing as the backstage interviewer for the SmackDown! brand and as an announcer on Velocity. He also hosted the WWE webcast Byte This! after Kevin Kelly was released. He later hosted several shows on WWE's official website, including Weekly Top 5, The WWE Experience, and After Burn. In 2003, Mathews also stood in for Tony Chimel as ring announcer for SmackDown!.

In 2004, Mathews was given some limited ring time on SmackDown! when John "Bradshaw" Layfield (JBL) slapped Mathews for not showing respect to JBL's chief of staff Orlando Jordan when he was interviewing him. He later offered and was accepted to be Booker T's temporary partner for a tag team match on an episode of SmackDown!. He and Booker T ultimately won the match. He was later assaulted by Jordan and requested from General Manager Theodore Long that he be given a one-on-one match against him. Booker T wanted to be at ringside during the Mathews-Jordan match, as JBL would no doubt be present, and would give Booker T an excuse to beat down JBL before their match at Survivor Series. Mathews once again emerged victorious against Jordan, with some considerable help from Booker T. He also tried to help Booker T in his WWE Championship match at the Survivor Series, but was given a Clothesline From Hell by JBL for his efforts. On the March 31, 2005 episode of SmackDown! Mathews was attacked by Kurt Angle. Mathews was then possessed by The Undertaker on the December 9, 2005 episode of SmackDown! while interviewing Randy Orton.

==== Commentator (2006–2014) ====
Mathews filled in for an absent Todd Grisham on a summer 2006 episode of Raw. He also hosted pre-shows for WWE pay-per-view events, and he provided color commentary on Heat from time to time before the show was cancelled in May 2008. He was the host of WWE.com's Weekly Top Five when it started and hosted it until April 2009 when he was replaced by Jack Korpela. During Todd Grisham's stint as ECW commentator, Mathews replaced him as Raw's backstage interviewer. Mathews, along with WWE Diva Candice Michelle were WWE's correspondents at both the Democratic and Republican National Conventions in an effort to encourage WWE fans to register to vote for the 2008 Presidential election.

On the April 7, 2009, episode of ECW, Mathews was announced as the new play-by-play commentator, as the previous commentator, Todd Grisham was moved to SmackDown after Tazz departed WWE. In addition to commentating on ECW and ECW pay-per-view matches, Mathews along with Matt Striker represented the ECW brand on Superstars every week starting with the inaugural episode on April 16, 2009. After ECW's closure, Mathews became the color commentator of NXT. On the April 9, 2010 episode of SmackDown, Mathews was attacked with a sleeper hold by Dolph Ziggler when he was interviewing him. On December 10, Mathews officially replaced Todd Grisham as the play-by-play commentator for SmackDown, commentating alongside Michael Cole and Striker. On the February 4, 2011, episode of SmackDown, Mathews and Cole were joined by Booker T, forming a three-man announce team. Mathews was replaced by William Regal as a commentator on season five of NXT in 2011.

In late 2010, Mathews often worked as the color commentator on Raw due to Jerry Lawler's increased in-ring competition. On April 3, 2011, Mathews commentated the majority of WrestleMania XXVII, though he received a 'Stone Cold Stunner' from an angered Stone Cold Steve Austin, cutting his night short. The following night on Raw, Mathews found himself aligned with Jerry Lawler, and against Michael Cole. He then became the alternate spokesman for the Anonymous Raw General Manager, when Michael Cole was not commentating. He then using the new catchphrase "The Anonymous Raw General Manager says...", before reading each e-mail. On the April 25 episode of Raw, Mathews announced that the Jim Ross and Jerry Lawler vs. Michael Cole and Jack Swagger match at Extreme Rules will be a Country Whipping match, which Cole and Swagger won. At the following pay-per-view, Over the Limit, Mathews supported Lawler, Bret Hart and Eve Torres in having Michael Cole kiss Lawler's foot. The following night, again as the spokesman for the anonymous Raw General Manager, Mathews read the e-mail that denied The Miz's request for another title shot, seemingly done with John Cena. He left the Raw broadcasting table the following week, after Cole and Lawler reconciled, though he remained on the show as a backstage interviewer and backup commentator.

Mathews reunited with his former ECW and SmackDown broadcast partner Matt Striker on the November 10, 2011 episode of Superstars, becoming the full-time broadcasting team. He and Striker also called the November 9, 2011 broadcast of NXT, marking his second return to the show since his original run ended after season four. On the April 23, 2012 episode of Raw, Mathews was throttled by Brock Lesnar after Lesnar believed Mathews had made a smart-aleck comment towards him. Later in the year, he was attacked at SummerSlam, this time by Kane, who was angry over being defeated by Daniel Bryan. Mathews was again attacked by Kane on August 31, 2012 episode of SmackDown after he lost his match against Alberto Del Rio.

Mathews was the play-by-play commentator of Saturday Morning Slam throughout the show's 2012–2013 run. He was also a commentator of Main Event. On September 27, 2013, he started as commentator of Superstars with Tom Phillips. On October 18, 2013 episode of SmackDown, Alberto Del Rio attacked Mathews while threatening John Cena about what he was going to do to him in Hell in a Cell. On June 25, 2014, Mathews was released from WWE ending his 13-year tenure with the company.

=== Total Nonstop Action Impact Wrestling (2014–2025) ===
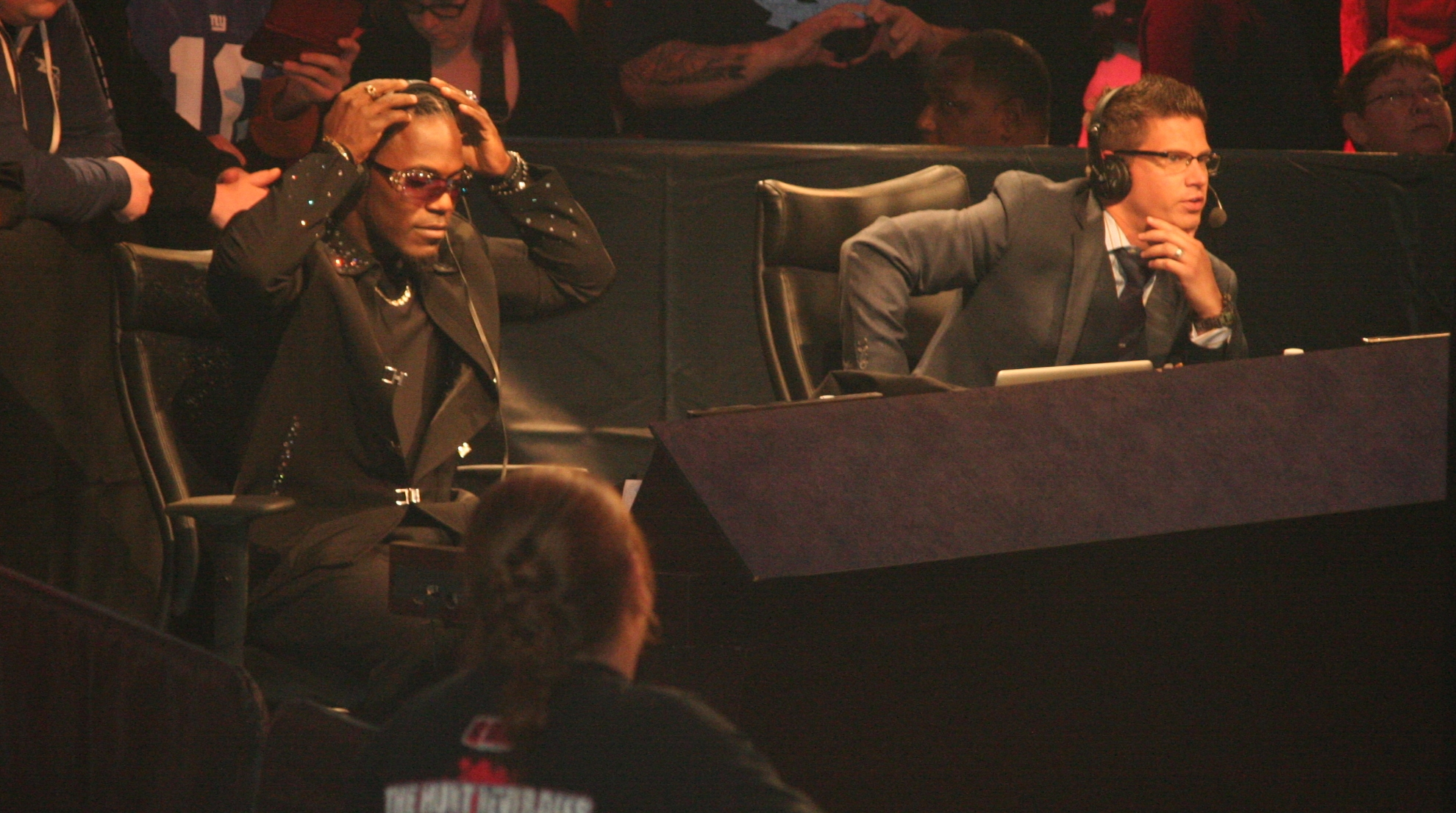
Mathews (right) commentating with D'Angelo Dinero in October 2015.

After being released from WWE, it was reported that Mathews had signed with Total Nonstop Action Wrestling (TNA) to work in their offices in Nashville. Throughout November and December, Mathews appeared in episodes of #ImWithSpud on TNA's YouTube channel. In December 2014, TNA confirmed that Mathews would take Mike Tenay's place. In January 2015, Mathews was the lead announcer of Impact! (TV series) alongside Taz. On June 3, 2015, D'Angelo Dinero officially joined Mathews as his broadcast partner for TNA Wrestling.

On the March 2, 2017 episode of Impact Wrestling, Mathews turned heel that night when he began favoring heel wrestlers over face wrestlers. He continuously praised himself, and he argued with D'Angelo Dinero throughout the broadcast. In April, Mathews had a series of arguments with Jeremy Borash and the two started a heated rivalry, which seemed to culminate in a match where Mathews and Borash formed teams of four wrestlers to compete against each other, with the team Mathews created ending up on the losing side, meaning he would no longer be lead-commentator. However, on April 21, Mathews returned to ringside accompanying Ethan Carter III, and joined Borash and Dinero, providing commentary, again belittling the wrestlers who the fans cheered for. At Slammiversary XV, Mathews teamed with Scott Steiner against Jeremy Borash and Joseph Park in a losing effort. On January 13, 2018, Matt Sydal turned heel and gifted his Impact Grand Championship to Mathews, only for Sydal to drop the belt to Austin Aries while defending it on Mathews' behalf. Following this, Mathews' heel commentator status was phased out.

Mathews ceased to be TNA's main play-by-play announcer following 2021 Hard To Kill, though he still occasionally filled in at shows when new lead Matt Striker was unavailable.

On February 12, 2025, it was reported that Mathews had parted ways with TNA ending his decade-long tenure with the company.

=== All Elite Wrestling (2025–present) ===
In May 2025, it was reported that Mathews had begun working for All Elite Wrestling (AEW) as a producer.

== Personal life ==
Lomberger was previously married to Rue DeBona from November 2006 until their divorce in 2008. In August 2015, Lomberger married Ashley Simmons, best known by her ring name Madison Rayne.

Mathews, along with Batista, Shelton Benjamin and Candice Michelle, represented WWE at the 2008 Democratic National Convention in an effort to persuade fans to register to vote in the 2008 presidential election.

== Championships and accomplishments ==
- TNA Wrestling
  - Impact Grand Championship (1 time)

Preceded by Mike Tenay	Impact! lead announcer 2015–2017	Succeeded by Jeremy Borash
Preceded by Jeremy Borash	Impact! lead announcer 2018–2021	Succeeded by Matt Striker
