= That's What Love Can Do =

- Artwork for the 1993 reissue

Single by Boy Krazy

from the album Boy Krazy
- B-side: "One Thing Leads To Another"
- Released: July 15, 1991
- Recorded: 1991, 1993
- Studio: PWL
- Genre: Dance, pop
- Length: 3:16 (1991 version); 3:20 (1993 version)
- Label: Next Plateau; London; PolyGram
- Songwriter: Stock Aitken Waterman
- Producer: Stock Aitken Waterman

Boy Krazy singles chronology
"That's What Love Can Do" (1991)	"All You Have To Do" (1992)

"That's What Love Can Do" is a song by American female pop group Boy Krazy, written and produced by British hitmaking team Stock Aitken Waterman, and first released in 1991 as Boy Krazy's debut single. Lead vocals were performed by group member Johnna Cummings. This was the only single in which group member Renée Veneziale would be involved, leaving the band in 1991 soon after its release. The song was a commercial failure in the UK, peaking at number 86 on the charts during the single's initial run; however, it reached number 18 on the US Billboard Hot 100 following a successful 1993 reissue.

== Background and writing ==
"That's What Love Can Do" was said to be originally written for Kylie Minogue's fourth album, but rejected after Minogue expressed her desire to change her style on her third album Rhythm of Love. However, Boy Krazy's version sounded like Minogue's first singles since vocalist Johnna Lee Cummings used the same Calrec Soundfield Microphone which heavily double tracked her voice. The B-side was a cover of "One Thing Leads to Another", originally by the SAW-produced boyband Yell!. The lyrics were slightly rewritten on Boy Krazy's version to reflect the gender change. The original 1991 release featured Renée Veneziale singing the second verse; this was re-recorded by Josselyne Jones in the 1993 version, which can be found on the 1993 single and the Boy Krazy album.

== Cover versions ==
"That's What Love Can Do" was also recorded by Samantha Fox during the sessions for her Just One Night album in 1991; however, the song was abandoned mid-production and left unreleased. 21 years later, a finished version of the song was included as a bonus track on the Just One Night Deluxe Edition in June 2012. In 1993, the Japanese female group Giri Giri Girls released a Japanese-language cover of the song, entitled "Your Cool Shore" (あなたの事ですずしい渚 Anata no koto de suzushii nagisa).

In 1999, Pete Waterman produced a remake of "That's What Love Can Do" performed by session singers Cheryl (aka Sheryl) Jay (lead), Vicky Dowdall (later in Girls@Play), and Nikki Wheeler and credited to Toutes Les Filles. The track was issued in August 1999 and, promoted by a video mostly shot on the Spanish seaside and also by numerous television spots, "That's What Love Can Do" by Toutes Les Filles charted higher in the UK than the Boy Krazy original while still failing to become a major hit peaking at number 44. The television promo for the single included an appearance by Toutes Les Filles on a program hosted by Jonathan Wilkes who maintained contact with group member Nikki Wheeler with the couple eventually marrying.

== Critical reception ==
Kenny Thomas reviewed the song for Smash Hits, commenting that it "sounds like Kylie", that Waterman "used that pop formula of his one time too many" and that "it's better than the Bananarama record [i.e. "Tripping on Your Love"], but not much better really". Retrospectively, in 2017, Christian Guiltenane of British magazine Attitude considered it a "good" song "that those few who did get to hear it still relish it to this day". In 2020, Daniel Griffiths of musicradar.com listed it as one of the five songs by SAW that producers need to hear, adding that it was "an oddity - and one of SAW's best tracks". In 2021, British magazine Classic Pop ranked the song number 35 in their list of 'Top 40 Stock Aitken Waterman songs', adding that "it remains a firm fan favourite", and considered Fox's version as being "inferior".

== Chart performance ==
At the end of 1992, "That's What Love Can Do" became successful in North American nightclubs, and radio airplay soon followed, prompting a re-release in early 1993. For this reissue, the song was remixed (the radio edit being an edit of the Hot Tracks remix, which was popular at nightclubs). The song was a success this time round, becoming the group's signature song, and peaking at number 18 in the Billboard Hot 100.

Denver radio station KQKS 104.3 FM (KS-104) played a significant role in the song's American breakthrough. Following its unsuccessful initial release in 1991, the recording received renewed airplay on KS-104 in late 1992 and became one of the station's five most-requested songs. The band was featured in an on-air broadcast to showcase the successful relaunch. During that visit, they were given merchandise for the then-newly formed Colorado Rockies baseball team (MLB), which is prominently featured in the American version of the music video. Contemporary reporting in Billboard credited the station with breaking the single, which subsequently achieved top-ten airplay in Tampa, Kansas City, Philadelphia, and New York.

It also reached number one in Pop airplay on the Radio & Records CHR/Pop chart, and number two on the Top 40 Mainstream chart. Excluding songs that charted after the Hot 100 rule changed to allow airplay-only songs to be eligible to chart; "That's What Love Can Do" is the lowest-peaking song on the Hot 100 that went number one in Pop airplay on the Radio and Records chart. The song's newfound North American chart success was not mirrored in the UK, with the reissue peaking at number 80 on the UK Singles Chart.

== Music video ==
Three videos were filmed: the 1991 video features the girls in a revolving scenario, the five members of the group sitting in swivel chairs and radiators, holding desk fans, using phone booths and interacting with other random objects. The 1993 American video shows the girls in a bar, intercut with some scenes of the girls choreographing the song. The 1993 British video mixed both previous video clips (with Renée Veneziale edited out of the parts taken from the 1991 video) with additional footage from the 1993 American video.

== Charts ==
=== Weekly charts ===
1991 weekly chart performance for "That's What Love Can Do"
Chart (1991)	Peak position
UK Singles (OCC)	86

1993 weekly chart performance for "That's What Love Can Do"
Chart (1993)	Peak position
Australia (ARIA)	124
Canada Retail Singles (The Record)	3
Canada Top Singles (RPM)	7
Germany (GfK)	54
Netherlands (Single Top 100)	29
UK Singles (OCC)	80
US Billboard Hot 100	18
US Top 40 Mainstream (Billboard)	2
US Adult Contemporary (Billboard)	19
US Rhythmic Top 40 (Billboard)	33
US Cash Box Top 100	9
US Radio & Records Pop Airplay	1

=== Year-end charts ===
1993 year-end chart performance for "That's What Love Can Do"
Chart (1993)	Position
Canada Top Singles (RPM)	53
US Billboard Hot 100	70
