= Johnna Lee Cummings =

American pop music singer

- Born: November 16, 1971 (age 54); Philadelphia, Pennsylvania, U.S.
- Genres: pop, dance-pop, electronic
- Occupations: Singer, dancer
- Instrument: Vocals
- Years active: 1989–1996
- Labels: Next Plateau, PWL
- Formerly of: Boy Krazy

Johnna Lee Cummings (born November 16, 1971) is an American pop music singer known for her lead vocals with the early 1990s girl group Boy Krazy; under the direction of Stock Aitken Waterman, Boy Krazy became a one-hit wonder on American Top 40 music charts with their hit song "That's What Love Can Do" which was released in 1991, but became a bigger hit after it was remixed and re-released two years later.

== Early life ==
Cummings was born and raised in Philadelphia and moved to New York City at the age of 17.

== Boy Krazy ==
Boy Krazy had significant dance club success with their singles in the UK and the US and Canada. "That's What Love Can Do" is their most famous track, where it hit #18 in America in 1993, nearly 2 years after its release. The song had charted in the UK upon initial release at #86 in 1991. It re-entered the charts at #80 coinciding with the increase in American popularity. The American follow-up, "Good Times With Bad Boys" peaked at #59 in the US. In the UK, the group's second single released in that territory, "All You Have To Do" peaked at #91.

== Solo career ==
After leaving the group, Cummings signed a solo record deal in the mid 1990s with PWL International Ltd. Using just her first name Johnna, her 1996 debut single, "Do What You Feel", received attention and featured remixes by dance music producer Matt Darey. The radio edit, peaked just outside the Top 40 in the UK Singles Chart, at #43. The follow-up, another uptempo house-pop track, "In My Dreams", peaked at #66 in the UK chart. A third album called Pride was released in 1996 but failed to reach the UK Albums Chart. Nevertheless, Cummings' label released the title track as a single. It was produced by Motiv 8. The single peaked outside the UK Singles Chart top 75, and the same was true of her next single, "Let The Spirit Move You".

== Personal life ==
Cummings was briefly engaged to former Florida kickboxer Mike Vieira.

In 2007, Johnna's then-current lifestyle was chronicled in filmmaker Kimberly Craig's short documentary, Expect Less.

== Discography ==
=== Albums ===
Year	Album
1996	Pride

=== Singles ===
Year	Single	UK	AUS
1996	"Do What You Feel"	43	231
1996	"In My Dreams"	66	-
1996	"Pride"	85	-
1996	"Let The Spirit Move You"	126	-
