= Jason Donovan discography =

- Studio albums: 6
- EPs: 19
- Compilation albums: 5
- Singles: 24
- Video albums: 6
- Music videos: 12
- Cast recording albums: 2
- Video singles: 2

This is the discography of Australian actor and singer Jason Donovan.

== Albums ==
=== Studio albums ===
Title	Album details	Peak chart positions										Certifications
Title	Album details	AUS	AUT	FIN	FRA	GER	NL	NZ	SWE	SWI	UK	Certifications
Ten Good Reasons	Released: 1 May 1989; Label: PWL; Formats: CD, LP, MC	5	20	3	26	3	21	4	29	20	1	ARIA: Platinum; BVMI: Gold; BPI: 5× Platinum; IFPI SWI: Gold; RMNZ: Platinum
Between the Lines	Released: 29 May 1990; Label: PWL; Formats: CD, LP, MC	77	18	15	—	52	25	44	—	37	2	BPI: Platinum
All Around the World	Released: August 1993; Label: Polydor; Formats: CD, MC	—	—	—	—	—	—	—	—	—	27	
Let It Be Me	Released: 10 November 2008; Label: Universal; Formats: CD, digital download	—	—	—	—	—	—	—	—	—	28	
Soundtrack of the 80s	Released: 11 October 2010; Label: Universal; Formats: CD, digital download	—	—	—	—	—	—	—	—	—	20	
Sign of Your Love	Released: 12 March 2012; Label: Polydor; Formats: CD, digital download	—	—	—	—	—	—	—	—	—	36	
"—" denotes releases that did not chart or were not released in that territory.

=== Cast recording albums ===
Title	Album details	Peak chart positions				Certifications
Title	Album details	AUT	GER	NZ	UK	Certifications
Joseph and the Amazing Technicolor Dreamcoat	Released: 19 August 1991; Label: Polydor/Really Useful; Formats: CD, LP, MC; 1991 West End revival cast recording from the musical of the same name	32	83	50	1	BPI: Platinum
The New Rocky Horror Show – 25 Years Young	Released: November 1998; Label: Damn It Janet; Formats: CD; 1998 UK tour cast recording from the musical The Rocky Horror Show	—	—	—	—	
"—" denotes releases that did not chart or were not released in that territory.

=== Compilation albums ===
Title	Album details	Peak chart positions		
Title	Album details	AUS	AUT	UK
The Other Side of Jason Donovan	Released: 1990; Label: PWL; Formats: CD, MC; East Asia-only release	—	—	—
Greatest Hits	Released: 16 September 1991; Label: PWL; Formats: CD, LP, MC	132	30	9
The Very Best of Jason Donovan	Released: 6 September 1999; Label: Music Club; Formats: CD	—	—	—
Greatest Hits	Released: 4 December 2006; Label: EMI/PWL; Formats: CD	—	—	80
The Best of Jason Donovan	Released: 6 October 2017; Label: BMG/PWL; Formats: CD, digital download	—	—	—
"—" denotes releases that did not chart or were not released in that territory.

== Singles ==
=== As lead artist ===
Title	Year	Peak chart positions										Certifications	Album
Title	Year	AUS	AUT	BEL	FIN	FRA	GER	IRE	NL	NZ	UK	Certifications	Album
"Nothing Can Divide Us"	1988	3	—	38	12	—	—	3	—	39	5	ARIA: Gold; BPI: Silver	Ten Good Reasons
"Especially for You" (duet with Kylie Minogue)	1988	2	12	5	4	3	10	1	4	2	1	ARIA: Gold; BPI: Platinum; SNEP: Silver	Ten Good Reasons
"Too Many Broken Hearts"	1989	7	—	2	3	5	16	1	3	21	1	ARIA: Gold; BPI: Gold; SNEP: Silver	Ten Good Reasons
"Sealed with a Kiss"	1989	8	5	2	2	12	4	1	11	13	1		Ten Good Reasons
"Every Day (I Love You More)"	1989	43	—	6	8	37	19	1	47	41	2		Ten Good Reasons
"When You Come Back to Me"	1989	40	—	6	1	—	36	1	20	—	2	BPI: Gold	Between the Lines
"Hang On to Your Love"	1990	—	—	12	21	—	51	3	26	—	8		Between the Lines
"Another Night"	1990	—	—	12	6	—	52	6	43	—	18		Between the Lines
"Rhythm of the Rain"	1990	44	—	14	25	—	38	6	—	—	9		Between the Lines
"I'm Doing Fine"	1990	123	—	34	—	—	60	9	—	—	22		Between the Lines
"RSVP"	1991	97	—	22	—	—	66	8	—	—	17		Greatest Hits
"Any Dream Will Do"	1991	92	3	19	23	—	55	1	55	—	1	BPI: Gold; IFPI AUT: Gold	Joseph and the Amazing Technicolor Dreamcoat
"Happy Together"	1991	—	—	20	21	—	53	6	—	—	10		Greatest Hits
"Joseph Mega-Remix"	1991	—	—	—	—	—	—	—	—	—	13		Joseph and the Amazing Technicolor Dreamcoat
"Mission of Love"	1992	—	—	25	—	—	—	—	—	—	26		All Around the World
"As Time Goes By"	1992	—	—	—	—	—	—	—	—	—	26		All Around the World
"All Around the World"	1993	—	—	—	—	—	—	—	—	—	41		All Around the World
"Angel"	1993	—	—	—	—	—	—	—	—	—	—		All Around the World
"Share My World"	2007	—	—	—	—	—	—	—	—	—	118		Non-album single
"Dreamboats and Petticoats"	2008	—	—	—	—	—	—	—	—	—	—		Let It Be Me
"Pianjo"	2011	—	—	—	—	—	—	—	—	—	—		Non-album singles
"The Hits Megamix"	2011	—	—	—	—	—	—	—	—	—	—		Non-album singles
"Make Love"	2012	—	—	— (Note: "Make Love" didn't enter the Ultratop Flanders Top 50, but did peak at number 91 on the Ultratip chart.)	—	—	—	—	—	—	—		Sign of Your Love
"—" denotes releases that did not chart or were not released in that territory.

=== As featured artist ===
Title	Year	Peak chart positions								Certifications	Album
Title	Year	AUS	GER	IRE	NL	NZ	SWE	SWI	UK	Certifications	Album
"Do They Know It's Christmas?" (as part of Band Aid II)	1989	30	74	1	20	8	15	24	1	BPI: Platinum	Non-album single

== Videos ==
=== Video albums ===
Title	Album details	Peak chart positions
Title	Album details	UK
The Videos	Released: August 1989; Label: PWL Video; Formats: VHS, LaserDisc	1
The Videos 2	Released: October 1990; Label: PWL Video; Formats: VHS, LaserDisc	3
Into the Nineties Live!	Released: August 1991; Label: Castle Music Pictures; Formats: VHS	1
Greatest Video Hits	Released: September 1991; Label: PWL Video; Formats: VHS	4
All Around the World	Released: September 1993; Label: PolyGram Video; Formats: VHS	5
Live – All the Hits & More	Released: 26 November 2007; Label: 2 Entertain; Formats: DVD	20

=== Video singles ===
Title	Album details	Peak chart positions
Title	Album details	UK
"Any Dream Will Do"	Released: July 1991; Label: Polydor; Formats: VHS	1
"Joseph Mega-Remix"	Released: December 1991; Label: PolyGram Video; Formats: VHS	5

=== Music videos ===
Title	Year	Director
"Nothing Can Divide Us"	1988	Rob Wellington
"Especially for You"	1988	Chris Langman
"Too Many Broken Hearts"	1989	Chris Langman
"Sealed with a Kiss"	1989	Chris Langman
"Every Day (I Love You More)	1989	Pete Cornish
"When You Come Back to Me"	1989	Pete Cornish
"Do They Know It's Christmas?"	1989	Kevin Godley
"Hang On to Your Love"	1990	Paul Goldman
"Another Night"	1990	Paul Goldman
"Rhythm of the Rain"	1990	Aleksi Vellis
"I'm Doing Fine"	1990	Pete Cornish
"RSVP"	1991	Sally Bongers
"Any Dream Will Do"	1991	Unknown
"Happy Together"	1991	Pete Cornish
"Joseph Mega-Remix"		Unknown
"Mission of Love"	1992	Unknown
"As Time Goes By"	1992	Unknown
"All Around the World"	1993	Unknown
"Angel"	1993	Unknown
