= List of number-one singles of 1989 (Ireland) =

The following is a list of the IRMA's number-one singles of 1989.

Issue date	Song	Artist	Ref.
5 January	"Especially for You"	Kylie Minogue and Jason Donovan	
12 January	"Especially for You"	Kylie Minogue and Jason Donovan	
19 January	"Especially for You"	Kylie Minogue and Jason Donovan	
26 January	"The Living Years"	Mike and the Mechanics	
2 February	"Something's Gotten Hold of My Heart"	Marc Almond featuring Gene Pitney	
9 February	"Something's Gotten Hold of My Heart"	Marc Almond featuring Gene Pitney	
16 February	"Belfast Child"	Simple Minds	
23 February	"Belfast Child"	Simple Minds	
2 March	"Leave Me Alone"	Michael Jackson	
9 March	"Too Many Broken Hearts"	Jason Donovan	
16 March	"Like a Prayer"	Madonna	
23 March	"Like a Prayer"	Madonna	
30 March	"Paradise City"	Guns N' Roses	
6 April	"Eternal Flame"	The Bangles	
13 April	"When Love Comes to Town"	U2 featuring B. B. King	
20 April	"Eternal Flame"	The Bangles	
27 April	"Eternal Flame"	The Bangles	
4 May	"Far from Home"	Daniel O'Donnell	
11 May	"Hand on Your Heart"	Kylie Minogue	
18 May	"Ferry Cross the Mersey"	Gerry Marsden, Holly Johnson, Paul McCartney & The Christians	
25 May	"Ferry Cross the Mersey"	Gerry Marsden, Holly Johnson, Paul McCartney & The Christians	
1 June	"Heart & Soul"	No Sweat	
8 June	"Heart & Soul"	No Sweat	
15 June	"Sealed With a Kiss"	Jason Donovan	
22 June	"All I Want Is You"	U2	
29 June	"All I Want Is You"	U2	
6 July	"And a Bang on the Ear"	The Waterboys	
13 July	"Liberian Girl"	Michael Jackson	
20 July	"You'll Never Stop Me Loving You"	Sonia	
27 July	"Too Much"	Bros	
3 August	"Too Much"	Bros	
10 August	"Swing the Mood"	Jive Bunny and the Mastermixers	
17 August	"Swing the Mood"	Jive Bunny and the Mastermixers	
24 August	"Lion in a Cage"	Dolores Keane	
31 August	"Lion in a Cage"	Dolores Keane	
7 September	"Every Day (I Love You More)"	Jason Donovan	
14 September	"Every Day (I Love You More)"	Jason Donovan	
21 September	"Right Here Waiting"	Richard Marx	
28 September	"Ride on Time"	Black Box	
5 October	"Sweet Surrender"	Wet Wet Wet	
12 October	"Sweet Surrender"	Wet Wet Wet	
19 October	"That's What I Like"	Jive Bunny and the Mastermixers	
26 October	"That's What I Like"	Jive Bunny and the Mastermixers	
2 November	"That's What I Like"	Jive Bunny and the Mastermixers	
9 November	"Never Too Late"	Kylie Minogue	
16 November	"Don't Know Much"	Linda Ronstadt and Aaron Neville	
23 November	"Don't Know Much"	Linda Ronstadt and Aaron Neville	
30 November	"Don't Know Much"	Linda Ronstadt and Aaron Neville	
7 December	"When You Come Back to Me"	Jason Donovan	
14 December	"Do They Know It's Christmas?"	Band Aid II	
21 December	"Do They Know It's Christmas?"	Band Aid II	
28 December	"Do They Know It's Christmas?"	Band Aid II	

- 31 number ones
- Most number ones: Jason Donovan (5)
- Most weeks at number one (song): "Especially for You" – Kylie Minogue and Jason Donovan, "Eternal Flame" – The Bangles, "Swing the Mood Again" – Various Artists, "Don't Know Much" – Linda Ronstadt and Aaron Neville, "Do They Know It's Christmas" – Band Aid II (3 weeks)
- Most weeks at number one (artist): Jason Donovan (8 weeks)

== See also ==
- 1989 in music
- List of artists who reached number one in Ireland
