= Greatest Hits (1991 Jason Donovan album) =

1991 compilation album by Jason Donovan

Compilation album by Jason Donovan
- Released: September 1991
- Recorded: 1988–1991
- Genre: Pop, dance-pop, pop rock
- Label: PWL
- Producer: Stock Aitken Waterman

Jason Donovan chronology
Between the Lines (1990)	Greatest Hits (1991)	All Around the World (1993)

Singles from Greatest Hits
- 1. "R.S.V.P." Released: 7 May 1991; 2. "Happy Together" Released: 12 August 1991

Greatest Hits is the first compilation album to be released by Australian singer Jason Donovan. The collection was released in 1991.

The album featured all his UK hit singles up to this point apart from his recent No.1 single "Any Dream Will Do", which featured on the cast recording of Joseph and the Technicolor Dreamcoat (released on the Polydor label). 10 of the 13 tracks had featured on Donovan's first two albums, with new singles "R.S.V.P." and "Happy Together" included along with a cover of the Elvis Presley hit "A Fool Such as I". This album marked the end of Donovan's work with Stock Aitken Waterman, the producers who had masterminded his music career up to this point.

The album reached No.9 on the UK Charts and a video compilation was released to coincide with the album. The cover photo was taken during sessions for the "When You Come Back to Me" single and was therefore two years old at the time of release.

== Track listing ==
1. "Nothing Can Divide Us" (3:45) from Ten Good Reasons
2. "Especially for You" (3:58) (Duet with Kylie Minogue) from Ten Good Reasons
3. "Too Many Broken Hearts" (3:26) from Ten Good Reasons
4. "Sealed With a Kiss" (2:30) (Geld / Udell) from Ten Good Reasons
5. "Every Day (I Love You More)" (3:24) from Ten Good Reasons
6. "When You Come Back to Me" (3:31) from Between the Lines
7. "Hang On to Your Love" (3:02) from Between the Lines
8. "Another Night" (3:25) from Between the Lines
9. "Rhythm of the Rain" (3:08) (Gummoe) from Between the Lines
10. "I'm Doing Fine" (2:59) from Between the Lines
11. "R.S.V.P." (3:10) Previously unreleased
12. "Happy Together" (3:12) (Bonner / Gordon) Previously unreleased
13. "A Fool Such as I" (2:16) (Trader) Previously unreleased

All tracks written by Stock Aitken Waterman unless otherwise stated

== Charts ==
Chart (1991)	Peak position
Austrian Albums (Ö3 Austria)	30
European Albums (Eurotipsheet)	26
Irish Albums (IFPI)	6
UK Albums (OCC)	9
