= All Around the World (Jason Donovan album) =

Studio album by Jason Donovan
- Released: August 1993
- Recorded: 1988 – 1991; April 1992 – June 1993 (new material)
- Genres: Pop, dance-pop, pop rock, arena rock, orchestral pop
- Length: 68:08 (standard); 59:59 (Polydor edition)
- Label: Polydor
- Producers: Paul Staveley O'Duffy, Phil Thornalley, Stock Aitken Waterman

Jason Donovan chronology
Greatest Hits (1991)	All Around the World (1993)	Greatest Hits (2006)

Singles from Between the Lines
- 1. "Mission Of Love" Released: 6 July 1992; 2. "As Time Goes By" Released: 16 November 1992; 3. "All Around The World" Released: 26 July 1993; 4. "Angel" Released: 1993

Professional ratings
Review scores
Source	Rating
Music Week	2/5 stars
NME	3/10
Smash Hits	0/5

All Around the World is the third studio album by Jason Donovan, released in 1993.

The album was Donovan's first on Polydor Records and his first since parting with producers Stock Aitken Waterman. It featured the singles "Mission of Love" (written by Halo James members Ray St. John and Christian James) (UK #26), "As Time Goes By" (UK #26) and "All Around the World" (UK #41). The style of the album marked a change of direction from his previous work. The singles had failed to sell as well as his previous hits and "As Time Goes By" would be Donovan's final UK Top 40 hit.

The recording sessions of the album required significant re-recording due to Donovan's new theatrical singing style and Polydor initially being unhappy with its production.

== Commercial Release ==
In a bid to generate more interest, Polydor Records licensed several of Donovan's old hits and included them on the album, much to Donovan's annoyance. Ten of the tracks were new recordings and were initially intended to be the album, the additions were four of his hits with Stock Aitken Waterman and two songs from the Joseph and the Technicolor Dreamcoat cast recording, featuring Donovan.

The album itself proved to be a commercial failure, stalling at no.27 in the UK and not even being released at all in his native Australia. A fourth single, "Angel", was intended for release, but cancelled. Donovan was subsequently dropped by Polydor Records and this would be his last studio album for 15 years.

A digital reissue called "The Polydor Edition" replaced the Greatest Hits tracks with B-sides and unreleased music, which includes a cover of Roxette's "The Sweet Hello, The Sad Goodbye".

== Track listing ==
=== Original ===
1. "All Around the World" (4:17)
2. "Falling" (3:23)
3. "Mission of Love" (4:19)
4. "As Time Goes By" (4:00)
5. "Once in My Life" (4:32)
6. "Rhythm of the Rain" (3:09)
7. "Oxygen" (4:05)
8. "Sealed With a Kiss" (2:32)
9. "Angel" (3:42)
10. "Any Dream Will Do" (3:54)
11. "Give a Good Heart" (3:35)
12. "Can't Do Without It" (3:56)
13. "Close Every Door" (3:49)
14. "Every Day (I Love You More)" (3:25)
15. "Too Many Broken Hearts" (3:29)
16. "Shout About" (4:01)

=== Digital reissue ===
1. "All Around the World" (4:17)
2. "Falling" (3:23)
3. "Mission of Love" (4:19)
4. "As Time Goes By" (4:00)
5. "Once in My Life" (4:32)
6. "Symptoms Of A Real Love" (3:52)
7. "Whenever The Sun Goes Down" (3:49)
8. "Oxygen" (4:05)
9. "Never Gonna Change" (3:55)
10. "Angel" (3:42)
11. "Give a Good Heart" (3:35)
12. "Can't Do Without It" (3:56)
13. "Sweet Hello, Sad Goodbye" (4:40)
14. "Shout About" (4:01)
15. "Any Dream Will Do" (3:53)

== Charts ==
Chart (1993)	Peak position
European Albums (Eurotipsheet)	100
UK Albums (Official Charts)	27
