= Greatest Hits (2006 Jason Donovan album) =

2006 compilation album by Jason Donovan

Compilation album by Jason Donovan
- Released: 4 December 2006
- Recorded: 1988–1991
- Genre: Pop, dance-pop, hi-NRG
- Label: EMI
- Producer: Stock Aitken Waterman

Jason Donovan chronology
All Around the World (1993)	Greatest Hits (2006)	Let It Be Me (2008)

Greatest Hits is a compilation album by singer Jason Donovan. The album featured all the hit singles by Donovan while he was produced by Stock Aitken Waterman.

The collection was released in late 2006 to coincide with the singer's appearance on the TV reality show I'm a Celebrity...Get Me Out of Here!. EMI, the record label, had licensed the songs from PWL Records, but missed lesser hits Donovan had on other labels, such as "Mission of Love" and "All Around the World", although did include the No.1 single "Any Dream Will Do" (all originally released through Polydor).

As it is, the album contains ten UK top ten hits - four of them No.1s. The album itself charted at a low No.80, although was almost identical to the Greatest Hits collection released in 1991 as well as a budget-priced compilation available since 1999.

Donovan also undertook a UK tour to promote the album (entitled All the Hits and More Tour) where he performed new music that has since been unreleased.

== Track listing ==
1. "Too Many Broken Hearts"
2. "Every Day (I Love You More)"
3. "Especially for You" (Duet with Kylie Minogue)
4. "Sealed With a Kiss"
5. "Any Dream Will Do"
6. "When You Come Back to Me"
7. "Nothing Can Divide Us"
8. "Rhythm of the Rain"
9. "Hang On to Your Love"
10. "Happy Together"
11. "I'm Doing Fine"
12. "Another Night"
13. "RSVP"

== Charts ==
Chart performance for Greatest Hits
Chart (2006)	Peak position
UK Albums (OCC)	80
