= Hang On to Your Love (Jason Donovan song) =

1990 single by Jason Donovan

Single by Jason Donovan

from the album Between the Lines
- Released: 8 March 1990
- Recorded: 1989
- Genre: Synthpop, dance-pop
- Length: 3:00
- Label: PWL Records
- Songwriter: Stock Aitken Waterman
- Producer: Stock Aitken Waterman

Jason Donovan singles chronology
"When You Come Back to Me" (1989)	"Hang On to Your Love" (1990)	"Another Night" (1990)

"Hang On to Your Love" is a 1990 song by Australian singer Jason Donovan. It was released on 8 March 1990 as the second single from his second album Between the Lines, on which it appears as the second track. Written and produced by Stock Aitken Waterman, the song was accompanied by a music video directed by Paul Goldman. The B-side, "You Can Depend on Me", is not another track from the Between the Lines album, but features on Donovan's previous album, Ten Good Reasons. It became a top ten hit in the UK and in Ireland, but was not officially released in Australia, following the tepid response to Donovan's prior single, "When You Come Back to Me".

== Chart performance ==
Like Donovan's previous singles, "Hang On to Your Love" peaked inside the top ten in both the UK and Ireland. It started at number nine on 7 April 1990 on the UK Singles Chart, reached number eight the next week (his first not to reach the top five), and charted for a total of seven weeks, which was then Donovan's shortest chart run for one of his singles on the UK chart. In Ireland, it peaked at number three and charted for five weeks. In Continental Europe, it attained number 12 in the Flanders region of Belgium, number 21 in Finland, number 26 in the Netherlands, and missed the top 50 by one place in Germany where it charted for 13 weeks. On the pan-European Hot 100 singles compiled by Music & Media, it debuted at a peak of number 23, a position it held for three consecutive weeks out of a nine-week chart run, and reached number 30 on the European Airplay Top 50.

== Formats and track listings ==
- 7" single
1. "Hang On to Your Love" — 3:00
2. "You Can Depend on Me" — 3:32
- 12" maxi
1. "Hang On to Your Love" (extended version) — 6:47
2. "Hang On to Your Love" (instrumental) — 3:48
3. "You Can Depend on Me" — 3:32
- CD maxi
1. "Hang On to Your Love" (extended version) — 6:47
2. "Hang On to Your Love" (instrumental) — 3:48
3. "You Can Depend on Me" — 3:32

== Charts ==
Weekly chart performance for "Hang On to Your Love"
Chart (1990)	Peak position
Austria (Airplay Top 20)	18
Belgium (Ultratop 50 Flanders)	12
Europe (European Airplay Top 50)	30
Europe (Eurochart Hot 100 Singles)	23
Finland (Suomen virallinen lista)	21
Germany (GfK)	51
Ireland (IRMA)	3
Luxembourg (Radio Luxembourg)	5
Netherlands (Dutch Top 40)	33
Netherlands (Single Top 100)	26
Switzerland (Airplay Top 20)	15
UK Singles (OCC)	8
