= (I'm Watching) Every Little Move You Make =

1963 song written by Paul Anka

Single by Jimmy Cassidy
- A-side: "Paradise"
- Released: May 8, 1963
- Length: 2:10
- Label: Oriole
- Songwriter(s): Paul Anka

Jimmy Cassidy singles chronology
"(I'm Watching) Every Little Move You Make" (1963)	"Soir De Paris" (1966)

"(I'm Watching) Every Little Move You Make"

Single by Little Peggy March

from the album I Will Follow Him
- A-side: "After You"
- Released: December 1963
- Recorded: Late 1963
- Genre: Pop
- Length: 2:10
- Label: RCA Victor
- Songwriter(s): Paul Anka

Little Peggy March singles chronology
"The Impossible Happened" (1963)	"(I'm Watching) Every Little Move You Make" (1963)	"Leave Me Alone" (1964)

"I'm watching"

Single by Sylvie Vartan

from the album Twiste et Chante
- Released: August 1963
- Recorded: 1963
- Genre: Pop
- Length: 2:00
- Label: RCA Victor

Sylvie Vartan singles chronology
"En écoutant la pluie" (1963)	"I'm watching" (1963)	"Twiste et chante" (1963)

"Je ne vois que toi"

Single by Sylvie Vartan

from the album Twiste et Chante
- Language: French
- English title: I only see you
- Released: October 1963
- Recorded: 1963
- Genre: Pop
- Length: 2:00
- Label: RCA Victor
- Songwriter(s): Paul Anka, Frank Gérald

"I'm Watching"

Single by Paul Anka
- B-side: "Hurry Up And Tell Me"
- Released: October 6, 1963
- Recorded: 1963
- Genre: Pop
- Length: 2:02
- Label: RCA Victor
- Songwriter(s): Paul Anka

Paul Anka singles chronology
"Hello Jim" (1963)	"I'm Watching" (1963)	"Did You Have a Happy Birthday?" (1963)

"(I'm Watching) Every Little Move You Make" is a song, written by Paul Anka and originally recorded by British singer Jimmy Cassidy in May 1963 as the B-side to his cover of the Nacio Herb Brown standard Paradise, followed by a cover in late 1963 by Little Peggy March for her debut album, I Will Follow Him, that was a minor hit on the charts in 1964. Anka himself also released his own version in October 1963 as a single in France.

In the same year, it became (under the title I'm watching) a hit for French singer Sylvie Vartan, who released it both in English and in French (under the title "Je ne vois que toi" on her 1963 album Twiste et chante) in August 1963.

== Track listings ==
=== Little Peggy March version ===
7-inch single (RCA Victor 47-8302, 1963)

A. "After You" (2:25)
B. "(I'm Watching) Every Little Move You Make" (2:10)

=== Sylvie Vartan versions ===
7-inch EP I'm watching / Deux enfants / Ne t'en vas pas / Les clous d'or (RCA Victor 86.019, 1963)

1. A1. "Ne t'en vas pas" ("Comin' Home Baby") (2:12)
2. A2. "Deux enfants" (1:46)
3. B1. "(I'm Watching) Every Little Move You Make" (1:59)
4. B2. "Les clous d'or" (2:00)

7-inch single (RCA Victor 46 005, 1963)

A. "(Watching You) Every Little Move You Make"
B. "Je ne vois que toi" ("Watching You")

== Charts ==
Little Peggy March version ("(I'm Watching) Every Little Move You Make")

Chart (1964)	Peak position
US Billboard Hot 100	64

Sylvie Vartan version ("I'm watching" / "Deux enfants" / "Ne t'en vas pas" / "Les clous d'or")

Chart (1963–1964)	Peak position
Belgium (Ultratop 50 Wallonia)	8
