= Twiste et chante =

Twiste et Chante

Studio album by Sylvie Vartan
- Released: July 1963
- Genre: Pop rock
- Length: 24:16
- Language: French; English
- Label: RCA Victor

Sylvie Vartan chronology
Sylvie (1962)	Twiste et Chante (1963)	Sylvie a Nashville (1964)

Singles from Twiste et chante
- 1. "En écoutant la pluie / Jamais / Avec moi / Mon ami" Released: April 1963 (EP); 2. "I'm watching / Deux enfants / Ne t'en vas pas / Les clous d'or" Released: August 1963 (EP); 3. "Twiste et chante / Je Ne Vois Que Toi / Il Faut Choisir / Comm' Tu Es Fou" Released: October 1963 (EP)

Professional ratings
Review scores
Source	Rating
Allmusic	4/5 stars

Twiste et Chante is the second studio album by French pop singer Sylvie Vartan. The music was conducted by Eddie Vartan for the Eddie Vartan et Son Orchestre.

== Track listing ==
1. "Twiste et chante" ("Twist and Shout") - (Phil Medley, Bert Russell, Georges Aber) (2:00)
2. "Les clous d'or" (2:00)
3. "Avec moi" ("So Long Baby") (2:03)
4. "Ne t'en vas pas" ("Comin' Home Baby") (2:13)
5. "Mon ami" ("Where Do I Go") - (Gerry Goffin, Carole King; words adapted by Manou Roblin and Rudi Revil) (2:15)
6. "Je ne vois que toi" ("I'm Watching") (2:00)
7. "(I'm Watching) Every Little Move You Make" (2:00)
8. "En écoutant la pluie" ("Rhythm in the Rain") (2:28)
9. "Comm' tu es fou" ("I Got It") (2:07)
10. "Deux enfants" (1:47)
11. "Il faut choisir" ("It's Up to You") (2:49)
12. "Il revient" ("Say Mama") (1:54)
