= Twist and Shout =

1961 single by the Top Notes

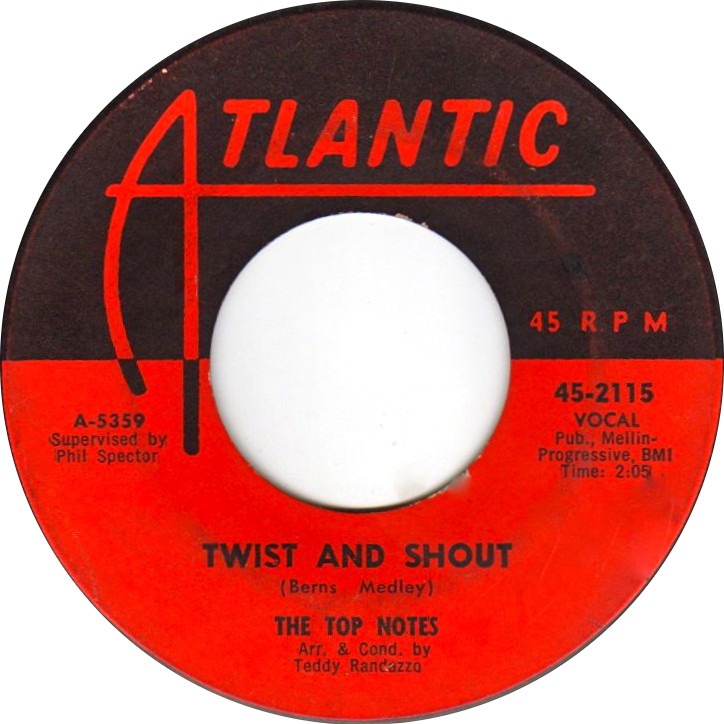

Single by the Top Notes
- A-side: "Always Late (Why Lead Me On)"
- Released: August 1961
- Recorded: February 23, 1961
- Studio: Atlantic, New York City
- Genre: R&B
- Length: 2:05
- Label: Atlantic
- Songwriters: Bert Berns; Phil Medley
- Producer: Phil Spector

The Top Notes singles chronology
"Hearts of Stone" (1961)	"Twist and Shout" (1961)	"Wait for Me Baby" (1962)

"Twist and Shout" is a 1961 song written by Phil Medley and Bert Berns (later credited as "Bert Russell"). It was originally recorded by The Top Notes, but it did not become a hit in the record charts until it was reworked by the Isley Brothers for their album Twist & Shout in 1962. The song has been covered by several artists, including the Beatles, Salt-N-Pepa, and Chaka Demus & Pliers, who experienced chart success with their versions.

== Original version ==
The Top Notes, an American R&B vocal group, recorded "Twist and Shout" at the Atlantic Studios on February 23, 1961. The session was arranged by Teddy Randazzo and produced by Phil Spector. (Note: In 1961, Spector was staff producer at Atlantic Records, before he developed his trademark "Wall of Sound".) The Top Notes' Howard "Howie" Guyton provided the lead vocals, with accompaniment by saxophonist King Curtis, guitarist John Pizzarelli, drummer Panama Francis, and backing vocalists the Cookies.

In a song review for AllMusic, Richie Unterberger described the Top Notes recording as "a Latin-tinged raveup with a drab generic R&B melody" that he felt was "not very good". Bert Berns, the song's co-writer, was dissatisfied with the recording and Spector's production. It failed to chart.

== The Isley Brothers version ==
"Twist and Shout"
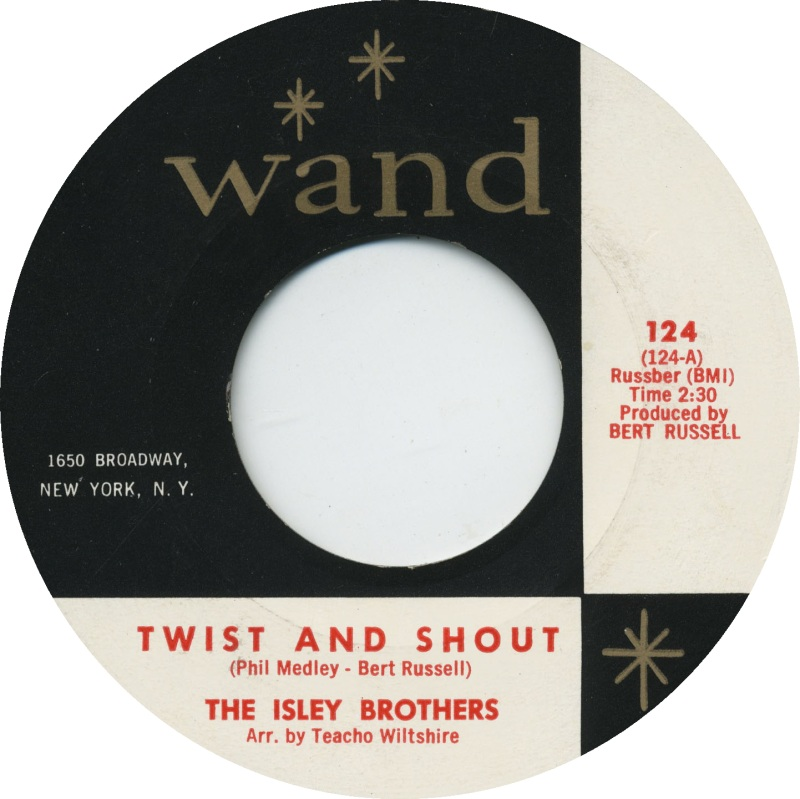

Single by the Isley Brothers

from the album Twist & Shout
- B-side: "Spanish Twist"
- Released: May 1962
- Recorded: New York City, 1962
- Genre: Rock and roll; R&B
- Length: 2:27
- Label: Wand
- Songwriters: Phil Medley; Bert Russell
- Producer: Bert Russell

The Isley Brothers singles chronology
"Shout" (1962)	"Twist and Shout" (1962)	"Twistin' With Linda" (1962)

When the Isley Brothers decided to record the song in 1962 for their album Twist & Shout, Berns (who also used the name Bert Russell) assumed the role of producer. According to Unterberger, the new arrangement infused the tune with more "gospel-fired soul passion". This arrangement introduced the song's iconic bridge—a dramatic build of four ascending notes and exultant whooping—that energized the tempo and seamlessly transitioned the group back into the verse.

"Twist and Shout" became the group's first single to reach the Top 20 on the US Billboard Hot 100 singles chart.

This version of the song was inducted into the Grammy Hall of Fame in 2010.

=== Personnel ===
- Lead vocals by Ronald Isley
- Background vocals by Rudolph Isley and O'Kelly Isley Jr.

=== Charts ===
Chart (1962–1963)	Peak position
UK Singles (OCC)	42
US Billboard Hot 100	17
US Hot Rhythm & Blues Singles	2
US Cash Box Top 100	7
US Cash Box Rhythm & Blues Singles	3

== The Beatles version ==
"Twist and Shout"
- US single of the Beatles recording

Single by the Beatles

from the album Introducing... The Beatles
- B-side: "There's a Place"
- Released: March 22, 1963 (UK Please Please Me album); March 2, 1964 (US single)
- Recorded: February 11, 1963
- Studio: EMI, London
- Genre: Rock and roll
- Length: 2:32
- Label: Parlophone (UK); Tollie (US)
- Songwriters: Phil Medley; Bert Russell
- Producer: George Martin

The Beatles US singles chronology
"My Bonnie" (1964)	"Twist and Shout" (1964)	"Can't Buy Me Love" (1964)

The Beatles' rendition of "Twist and Shout" was released on their first UK album Please Please Me in 1963, inspired by the Isley Brothers' version. John Lennon provided the lead vocals and initially felt ashamed of his performance in the song "because I could sing better than that, but now it doesn't bother me. You can hear that I'm just a frantic guy doing his best." A second take was attempted, but Lennon had nothing left due to a hoarse voice, and it was abandoned. At the end of the song, Lennon can be heard coughing. The Beatles' version of "Twist and Shout" has been called "the most famous single take in rock history." Mark Lewisohn called it "arguably the most stunning rock and roll vocal and instrumental performance of all time."

The song was released as a single in the US on March 2, 1964, with "There's a Place" as its B-side. It was released by Chicago-based Vee-Jay Records on the Tollie label and reached No. 2 on Billboard's singles chart on April 4, during the week that the top five places on the chart were all Beatles singles. It was the only million-selling Beatles single in the U.S. that was a cover song and the only Beatles cover single to reach the top 10 on a national record chart. The song failed to hit No. 1 because the group's own follow-up single "Can't Buy Me Love" held the spot. Cash Box rated the song No. 1 that same week.

In the UK, "Twist and Shout" was released by Parlophone on an eponymous EP with "Do You Want to Know a Secret", "A Taste of Honey", and "There's a Place" from the Please Please Me (1963) album. Both the EP and album reached No. 1. In Canada, it became the title track to the second album of Beatles material to be issued by Capitol Records of Canada on February 3, 1964.

The song was used as the Beatles' closing number on Sunday Night at the London Palladium in October 1963 and at The Royal Variety Show in November 1963; the Royal Variety performance was included on the Anthology 1 compilation album in 1995. The Beatles performed the song on their Ed Sullivan Show appearance in February 1964, and they continued to play it live until the end of their 1965 American tour. Additionally, they recorded "Twist and Shout" on nine occasions for BBC television and radio broadcasts, the earliest of which was for the Talent Spot radio show on November 27, 1962.

In the 1986 film Ferris Bueller's Day Off, Ferris Bueller (Matthew Broderick) lip-syncs to the Beatles' version of the song. Coincidentally, the Rodney Dangerfield film Back to School (released two days after Ferris) also featured the song, this one sung by Dangerfield himself in character as Thornton Melon and patterned after the Beatles' arrangement. The use in the two films helped propel the single up the Billboard Hot 100, where it peaked at No. 23 in the issue dated September 27, 1986, giving the group their second chart single of the 1980s (the other being "The Beatles' Movie Medley" in 1982).

In 2008, the Beatles' version was voted the second-best cover song in a poll by Total Guitar.

In November 2010, 47 years after its recording, the Beatles' version of "Twist and Shout" made a debut on the UK singles chart. One of a number of Beatles tracks re-entering the chart in the aftermath of their new availability on iTunes, it peaked at No. 48.

=== Personnel ===
Credits by Philippe Margotin and Jean-Michel Guesdon

- John Lennon – lead vocals, acoustic guitar
- Paul McCartney – backing vocals, bass
- George Harrison – backing vocals, electric guitar
- Ringo Starr – drums

=== Charts ===
Chart (1963–1964)	Peak position
Argentina (CAPIF)	1
Australian Kent Music Report	5
Belgium (Ultratop 50 Wallonia)	38
Canada CHUM Chart	5
Denmark (Danmarks Radio)	18
Finland (Official Finnish Charts)	1
Italy (Musica e dischi)	11
Netherlands (Single Top 100)	9
New Zealand (Lever Hit Parade)	1
Norway (VG-lista)	7
Spain (Promusicae)	5
Sweden (Kvällstoppen)	2
Sweden (Tio i Topp)	3
US Billboard Hot 100	2
US Cash Box Top 100	1
West Germany (GfK)	10

Chart (1986)	Peak position
US Billboard Hot 100	23
Canada Top Singles (RPM)	16

Chart (2010)	Peak position
UK Singles (Official Charts)	48

Chart (2015)	Peak position
Sweden Heatseeker (Sverigetopplistan)	5

=== Certifications ===
Region	Certification	Certified units/sales
Italy (FIMI)	Gold	25,000^{‡}
New Zealand (RMNZ)	Platinum	30,000^{‡}
Spain (Promusicae)	Platinum	60,000^{‡}
United Kingdom (BPI)	2× Platinum	1,200,000^{‡}
United States (RIAA)	Platinum	1,000,000^{‡}
^{‡} Sales+streaming figures based on certification alone.

== Brian Poole and the Tremeloes version ==
"Twist and Shout"

Single by Brian Poole and the Tremeloes

from the album Twist and Shout
- B-side: "We Know"
- Released: June 1963
- Length: 2:07
- Label: Decca
- Songwriters: Bert Berns; Phil Medley
- Producer: Mike Smith

Brian Poole and the Tremeloes singles chronology
"Keep On Dancing" (1963)	"Twist and Shout" (1963)	"Do You Love Me" (1963)

In 1962, Decca Records signed Brian Poole and the Tremeloes, a British group from Dagenham, East London, in preference to the Beatles. Both groups had auditioned on the same day, and it has become legend that the Beatles were rejected by the label. Ironically, Brian Poole and the Tremeloes had no chart success until the beat boom in British rock had surfaced, following the success of the Beatles. This triggered the frenzied signing of most of the popular Liverpool rock groups of that period by the major record labels, and their distinctive "sound" became known as Merseybeat. Brian Poole and the Tremeloes imitated this style and covered "Twist and Shout" for their album of the same name four months after the Beatles had released their version and achieved the No. 4 position in the UK Singles Chart.

However, according to Brian Poole, "we were doing 'Twist and Shout' on stage before we knew anybody else doing it and we felt we could have a hit with it. Unfortunately, we had it in the can for about a year before Decca decided to release it as a single".

=== Charts ===
Chart (1963)	Peak position
Belgium (Ultratop 50 Wallonia)	38
Denmark (Danmarks Radio)	4
Ireland (IRMA)	3
New Zealand (Lever Hit Parade)	4
UK Singles (Official Charts)	4
West Germany (GfK)	10

== Sylvie Vartan version ==
"Twiste et chante"

Single by Sylvie Vartan

from the album Twiste et Chante
- Language: French
- English title: "Twist and Sing"
- B-side: "Il faut choisir"
- Released: October 1963
- Length: 2:00
- Label: RCA Victor
- Songwriters: Phil Medley, Bert Russell, Georges Aber

Sylvie Vartan singles chronology
"I'm watching" (1963)	"Twiste et chante" (1963)	"Si je chante" (1963)

Music video
- "Twiste et chante" on YouTube

In 1963, the song was adapted into French by Georges Aber as "Twiste et chante", meaning "Twist and sing" and was recorded by French pop singer Sylvie Vartan and was released as the third and final single off of her sophomore album of the same name that October. The song peaked at Number 8 in the French Belgian charts in February 1964. A promotional video was also filmed for the song. Vartan also performed the song on the American variety music program Shindig! on March 24, 1965, along with a cover of Barrett Strong's "Money (That's What I Want)" (in English).

=== Charts ===
Chart (1963)	Peak position
Belgium (Ultratop 50 Wallonia)	8

== Salt-N-Pepa version ==
"Twist and Shout"

Single by Salt-N-Pepa

from the album A Salt with a Deadly Pepa
- B-side: "Get Up Everybody"
- Released: October 1988
- Length: 4:54 (album version); 3:48 (single version)
- Label: FFRR
- Songwriters: Bert Berns; Phil Medley
- Producer: Hurby Luv Bug Azor

Salt-N-Pepa singles chronology
"Shake Your Thang" (1988)	"Twist and Shout" (1988)	"Expression" (1989)

American hip hop trio Salt-N-Pepa recorded a cover version on their 1988 album A Salt with a Deadly Pepa. It was released as a single and was met with success, reaching the top five in Spain, the Netherlands and the UK, where it reached No. 4, as well as the top 40 in Belgium and West Germany and on the Irish Singles Chart.

=== Charts ===
==== Weekly charts ====
Chart (1988–1989)	Peak position
Belgium (Ultratop 50 Flanders)	11
Ireland (IRMA)	18
Netherlands (Dutch Top 40)	5
Netherlands (Single Top 100)	5
Spain (AFYVE)	5
UK Singles (Official Charts)	4
US Hot R&B/Hip-Hop Songs (Billboard)	45
US Hot Rap Songs (Billboard)	18
West Germany (GfK)	37

==== Year-end charts ====
Chart (1988)	Position
Netherlands (Single Top 100)	91

== Chaka Demus & Pliers version ==
"Twist and Shout"

Single by Chaka Demus & Pliers featuring Jack Radics and Taxi Gang

from the album Tease Me
- Released: December 6, 1993
- Length: 3:58
- Label: Mango
- Songwriters: Bert Berns; Phil Medley
- Producers: Lloyd "Gitsy" Willis; Sly & Robbie

Chaka Demus & Pliers singles chronology
"She Don't Let Nobody" (1993)	"Twist and Shout" (1993)	"Murder She Wrote" (1994)

Music video
- "Twist and Shout" on YouTube

Jamaican reggae duo Chaka Demus & Pliers, collaborating with Jack Radics and Taxi Gang, recorded "Twist and Shout" for their fourth album, Tease Me (1993). It was released as single on December 6, 1993, by Mango and Island Records, and topped the UK Singles Chart for two weeks in January 1994. The song was also a top-10 hit in Ireland (No. 9), Flanders (No. 7), the Netherlands (No. 6), Denmark (No. 4), and New Zealand (No. 2). It was nominated in the category for Tune of the Year at the International Dance Awards 1995.

=== Critical reception ===
Rick Anderson from AllMusic named the song "a fun novelty." Larry Flick from Billboard magazine wrote, "Who'da thunk this Beatles evergreen would become viable fodder for a reggae reconstruction? It has, and it works far better than you might imagine." He added, "With assistance from Jack Radis and Taxi Gang, Chaka Demus & Pliers playfully skip around a fast and jaunty island groove, darting in and out of familiar lyrics with bits of chatter and toasting. Visionary programmers will find this will flow over playlists like a fresh, cool breeze." Troy J. Augusto from Cash Box declared it as an "infectious cut", that "add peppy new island life to this classic made famous, of course, by The Beatles."

In a review for the Gavin Report, Dave Sholin commented, "Summertime—time to hit the beach and party! And what better for the occasion than this upbeat production that puts a new twist on the Isley Brothers' original and Beatles' cover?" Alan Jones from Music Week named it a "fine reggae re-reading", that "contains all the usual Chaka Demus & Pliers hallmarks, with sweetly cooed verses alternating with rapped passages. Just right for the party season." James Hamilton from the Record Mirror Dance Update described it as a "'La Bamba' based raver's reggae inflected but surprisingly conventional Sly & Robbie revival, a party season smash". Leesa Daniels from Smash Hits gave "Twist and Shout" three out of five, writing, "The tune at Christmas parties this year. Chaka and Pliers and a few mates have made a mega mover of a groover."

=== Charts ===
==== Weekly charts ====
Chart (1993–1994)	Peak position
Australia (ARIA)	13
Austria (Ö3 Austria Top 40)	12
Belgium (Ultratop 50 Flanders)	7
Canada Top Singles (RPM)	37
Canada Dance/Urban (RPM)	4
Denmark (IFPI)	4
Europe (Eurochart Hot 100)	7
Europe (European AC Radio)	12
Europe (European Dance Radio)	18
Europe (European Hit Radio)	3
France (SNEP)	23
Germany (GfK)	32
Iceland (Íslenski Listinn Topp 40)	12
Ireland (IRMA)	9
Netherlands (Dutch Top 40)	6
Netherlands (Single Top 100)	8
New Zealand (Recorded Music NZ)	2
Sweden (Sverigetopplistan)	16
Switzerland (Schweizer Hitparade)	17
UK Singles (Official Charts)	1
UK Airplay (Music Week)	1
UK Dance (Music Week)	1
UK Club Chart (Music Week)	41

==== Year-end charts ====
Chart (1993)	Position
UK Singles (OCC)	31

Chart (1994)	Position
Australia (ARIA)	76
Belgium (Ultratop)	81
Canada Dance/Urban (RPM)	43
Europe (Eurochart Hot 100)	48
Netherlands (Single Top 100)	94
New Zealand (RIANZ)	26
UK Singles (OCC)	60
UK Airplay (Music Week)	49

=== Certifications ===
Region	Certification	Certified units/sales
Australia (ARIA)	Gold	35,000^{^}
New Zealand (RMNZ)	Gold	5,000^{*}
United Kingdom (BPI)	Gold	400,000^{^}
^{*} Sales figures based on certification alone.^{^} Shipments figures based on certification alone.

=== Release history ===
Region	Date	Format(s)	Label(s)	Ref.
United Kingdom	December 6, 1993	7-inch vinyl; 12-inch vinyl; CD; cassette	Mango	
Japan	February 25, 1994	Mini-CD	Mango	
Australia	March 14, 1994	12-inch vinyl; CD	Mango	

== Other charting versions ==
Vianey Valdez had a top ten hit in Mexico with her version, "Muevanse Todos". It got to no. 4 for the week of August 1, 1964.

== See also ==
- List of twist songs
