= Between the Lines (Jason Donovan album) =

Studio album by Jason Donovan
- Released: 29 May 1990 (UK); 19 November 1990 (Australia)
- Genres: Pop; dance-pop; pop rock
- Length: 33:19
- Labels: PWL (UK); Mushroom (Australia)
- Producer: Stock Aitken Waterman

Jason Donovan chronology
Ten Good Reasons (1989)	Between the Lines (1990)	Greatest Hits (1991)

Singles from Between the Lines
- 1. "When You Come Back to Me" Released: 27 November 1989; 2. "Hang On To Your Love" Released: 8 March 1990; 3. "Another Night" Released: 18 June 1990; 4. "Rhythm of the Rain" Released: 20 August 1990; 5. "I'm Doing Fine" Released: 15 October 1990

Between the Lines is the second studio album by Australian pop singer Jason Donovan. It was released on 29 May 1990 by PWL and Mushroom.

== Background and release ==
Between the Lines was produced by the team Stock Aitken Waterman (SAW) and was Donovan's last album for the SAW production team, as the following year saw him take the lead role in the West End musical Joseph and the Amazing Technicolor Dreamcoat. Like his previous album, the title was taken from a line in one of the songs—in this case, the opening line of "When It's All Over" ("should have read between the lines..."), and also became the name of Donovan's autobiography, released in 2007.

Donovan supported the album with a national tour of the UK and Ireland, titled the "Doin' Fine Tour", which began in June 1990.

Between the Lines was re-issued in 2010 by Edsel records as a double CD set. In a review of its re-release, Music Week said this it was "arguably better" than his first album.

== Critical reception ==
In 2018, Mark Elliot of Classic Pop considered Between the Lines as the 11th best album ever produced by Stock Aitken Waterman; he added that it "contained some of [Donovan's] strongest numbers", including "vintage covers" and "more contemporary tracks", and underlined "Another Night" as being an "ABBA pastiche" and the best track from the album.

== Chart performance ==
Between the Lines reached number two in the UK charts, and was certified platinum by the British Phonographic Industry. The album features five UK Top 30 singles: "When You Come Back to Me" (UK #2), "Hang On to Your Love" (UK #8), "Another Night" (UK #18), "Rhythm of the Rain" (UK #9) and "I'm Doin' Fine" (UK #22), released between 1989 and 1990. The album was far less successful in Donovan's native Australia, where it peaked at no.77 in December 1990.

== Track listing ==
All tracks written by Stock Aitken Waterman, unless otherwise noted.

Side one

1. "When You Come Back to Me" – 3:33
2. "Hang On to Your Love" – 3:01
3. "Another Night" – 3:26
4. "Love Would Find a Way" – 3:32
5. "Rhythm of the Rain" (John Claude Gummoe) – 3:09

Side two

1. "I'm Doin' Fine" – 3:01
2. "Careless Talk and Silly Lies" – 3:25
3. "When It's All Over" – 3:42
4. "Like it Was Yesterday" – 2:56
5. "Hard to Say It's Over" – 3:34

=== Re-issue ===
CD 1

1. "When You Come Back to Me"
2. "Hang On to Your Love"
3. "Another Night"
4. "Love Would Find a Way"
5. "Rhythm of the Rain"
6. "I'm Doin' Fine"
7. "Careless Talk and Silly Lies"
8. "When It's All Over"
9. "Like It Was Yesterday
10. "Hard To Say It's Over"
11. "R.S.V.P"
12. "Happy Together"
13. "A Fool Such As I"
14. "Story Of My Life"
15. "When I Get You Alone"
16. "She's In Love With You"
17. "Hang On To Your Love (Extended Version)"
18. "Another Night (Sweet Dreams Mix)"
19. "I'm Doing Fine (Extended Version)"
20. "El Ritmo De La Lluvia (Rhythm Of The Rain - Spanish Version)"
21. "When You Come Back To Me (Yuletide Sleigh List Mix)"

CD 2

1. "When You Come Back to Me (Extended Version)"
2. "Rhythm of the Rain (Extended Version)"
3. "Story Of My Life (Extended Version)"
4. "R.S.V.P. (Extended Version)"
5. "Happy Together (Extended Version)"
6. "She's In Love With You (Extended Version)"
7. "When You Come Back to Me (No Probs Mix)"
8. "Another Night (The JD in Dub Mix)"
9. "Rhythm of the Rain (Kick That… Remix)"
10. "When You Come Back to Me (Original Mix)"
11. "Hang On to Your Love (Instrumental)"
12. "Another Night (Instrumental)"
13. "Rhythm of the Rain (Instrumental)"
14. "I'm Doing Fine (Instrumental)"
15. "R.S.V.P. (Instrumental)"
16. "Happy Together (Instrumental)"
17. "When You Come Back To Me (Guitar Instrumental)"

== Personnel ==
- Karen Hewitt, Yoyo – engineers
- Phil Harding, Pete Hammond, Dave Ford – mixers
- Mike Stock, Matt Aitken – keyboards
- Matt Aitken – guitars
- A Linn – drums
- Mae McKenna, Miriam Stockley, Linda Taylor, Mike Stock – backing vocals
- Recorded at PWL Studios, London
- Simon Fowler – photography
- Jason Donovan, David Howells – design
- Lino Carbosiero – hair

== Charts ==
=== Weekly charts ===
Chart (1990)	Peak position
Australian Albums (ARIA)	77
Austrian Albums (Ö3 Austria Top 40)	18
Dutch Albums (MegaCharts)	25
European Albums (European Top 100 Albums)	9
Finnish Albums (Suomen virallinen lista)	15
German Albums (Media Control Charts)	52
Irish Albums (IRMA)	2
New Zealand Albums (Recorded Music NZ)	44
Swiss Albums (Swiss Hitparade)	37
UK Albums (CIN)	2

=== Year-end charts ===
Chart (1990)	Rank
European Albums (European Top 100 Albums)	63

== Sales and certifications ==
Certifications for Between the Lines
Region	Certification	Certified units/sales
Spain (Promusicae)	Gold	50,000^{^}
United Kingdom (BPI)	Platinum	300,000^{^}
^{^} Shipments figures based on certification alone.
