= The Top Notes =

American rhythm and blues vocal group

- Derek Martin and Howard Guyton, while members of The Pearls (1956)

Background information
- Origin: Detroit, Michigan, U.S.
- Genres: Rhythm and blues, doo-wop
- Years active: 1960–1963
- Labels: Atlantic (1960–61); Festival (1962); ABC-Paramount (1963)
- Past members: Derek Martin; Howard Guyton; George Torrence Jr. Roy; Johnny; Barbara Wells; Dionne Warwick; Rosco King

The Top Notes were an American R&B vocal group, centered around the singers Derek Martin and Howard Guyton. They released a number of singles in the early 1960s, among which was the first recording of "Twist and Shout", which was a hit when recorded by the Isley Brothers and later by the Beatles.

== Members ==
Derek Don Martin (also known as "Derek Ray") was born in Detroit, Michigan, on July 2, 1938. He began his professional career at the age of 17 when he joined Duke Ellington as a vocalist. Howard "Howie" Guyton (also known as "Guy Howard") was born in c. 1938. He was a cousin of Dave "Baby" Cortez, who performed with Guyton and Martin in The Pearls.

Despite being primarily a vehicle for Martin and Guyton, other members of The Top Notes included George Wilson Torrence Jr. (who later became a pastor in Duncan, Oklahoma) and singers known as Roy and Johnny. When the group changed record labels in 1961, the line-up consisted solely of Martin and Guyton, who subsequently hired Barbara Wells, Dionne Warwick and Rosco King, a bass singer who had previously sung with them in The Five Pearls.

== Career ==
The group was formed from members of Martin and Guyton's previous bands, known at various times as The Five Pearls, The Sheiks, The Pearls and Howie and the Sapphires. These groups released records on Aladdin, Cat, Atco and Okeh Records respectively. In a 2015 interview, Martin suggests that the formation of The Top Notes was just a name-change to move away from names that had previously been associated with payola. The Top Notes signed to Atlantic Records in 1960, releasing two singles the same year — "A Wonderful Time" (b/w "Walkin' with Love") and "Say Yes" (b/w "Warm Your Heart").

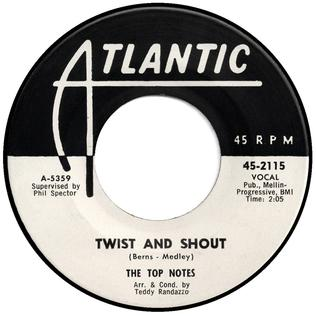
The Top Notes' 1961 single "Twist and Shout"

In 1961, the group recorded the single "Hearts of Stone" (b/w "The Basic Things") under the direction of Phil Spector, with King Curtis on saxophone. The second single that year was the first recorded version of Phil Medley and Bert Berns's "Twist and Shout", which was also produced by Spector. Recorded at Atlantic Studios on February 23, 1961, Martin and Guyton were accompanied by an orchestra conducted and arranged by Teddy Randazzo, which included King Curtis on tenor saxophone, Bucky Pizzarelli on guitar and Panama Francis and Gary Chester on percussion and drums respectively. Further accompaniment came from a 10-piece string ensemble and vocals from The Cookies. The single was not a hit, and the group did not release through the Atlantic again. "Twist and Shout" was later recorded by the Isley Brothers and The Beatles; the latter group's version reached number 2 in the US behind "Can't Buy Me Love" in 1964 when they held all the top five positions in the chart. By the end of the decade, Spector had moved on to produce the Beatles themselves.

In 1962, the group released "Wait for Me Baby" (b/w "Come Back Cleopatra) on Festival Records, before a final single, "I Love You So Much" (b/w "It's Alright") was released by ABC-Paramount Records in 1963.

Martin launched a solo career the same year. His first single was a cover version of Otis Blackwell's "Daddy Rolling Stone". A later single, "You Better Go", fell just short of the Top 20 R&B chart.

Guyton later joined a group touring as The Platters. During a tour of Argentina, 39-year-old Guyton collapsed in his Buenos Aires hotel room on October 22, 1977, and died from a heart attack.

== Singles discography ==
- Atlantic Records
  - 1960—"A Wonderful Time" (b/w "Walkin' with Love")
  - 1960—"Say Yes" (b/w "Warm Your Heart")
  - 1961—"Hearts of Stone" (b/w "The Basic Things")
  - 1961—"Twist and Shout" (b/w "Always Late (Why Lead Me On)")
- Festival Records
  - 1962—"Wait for Me Baby" (b/w "Come Back Cleopatra")
- ABC-Paramount Records
  - 1963—"I Love You So Much" (b/w "It's Alright")
