= Soundtrack of the 80s =

Studio album by Jason Donovan
- Released: 11 October 2010 (UK)
- Genre: Pop, dance, Hi-NRG, soul, synthpop
- Label: Universal Music TV

Jason Donovan chronology
Let it Be Me (2008)	Soundtrack of the 80s (2010)	Sign Of Your Love (2012)

Soundtrack of the 80s is the fifth studio album by the Australian singer Jason Donovan, released in October 2010. The album consists of cover versions of Donovan's favourite 1980s hits, as well as three new original tracks.

The album peaked at no.20 in the UK Albums Chart, though it fell to no.81 in its second week of release, before dropping out of the chart altogether. It is his last charting release; and had no singles.

== Track listing ==
1. "Everybody Wants to Rule the World" (originally by Tears for Fears)
2. "Don't Leave Me This Way" (Harold Melvin & the Blue Notes later Thelma Houston and The Communards)
3. "(I Just) Died in Your Arms" (Cutting Crew)
4. "Sign Your Name" (Terence Trent D'Arby)
5. "Broken Wings" (Mr. Mister)
6. "Only You" (Yazoo)
7. "Mary's Prayer" (Danny Wilson)
8. "Drive" (The Cars)
9. "Love Changes (Everything)" (Climie Fisher)
10. "Right Here Waiting" (Richard Marx)
11. "What is Love?" (Howard Jones)
12. "Innocence" (new track)
13. "Talk You Down" (new track)
14. "Goodnight Baby" (new track)

== Charts ==
Chart performance for Soundtrack of the 80s
Chart (2010)	Peak position
Scottish Albums (OCC)	25
UK Albums (OCC)	20
