= Let It Be Me (album) =

Studio album by Jason Donovan
- Released: November 10, 2008 (UK)
- Recorded: Early 2007 – Late 2008
- Genres: Pop, pop rock, rock and roll
- Label: Decca/Universal

Jason Donovan chronology
| Greatest Hits (2006) | Let It Be Me (2008) | Soundtrack of the 80s (2010) |

Singles from Let It Be Me
- 1. "Dreamboats & Petticoats" / "Be My Baby" Released: 3 November 2008

Let It Be Me is the fourth studio album by the Australian singer Jason Donovan. It was released in November 2008, and was Donovan's first new studio album in 15 years. It reached no.28 in the UK.

The album would have originally featured new music, such as Donovan's 2007 single "Share My World" but the plan was changed to become a cover album of classic songs from the 1950s and 1960s, with only the final two tracks being original. He also recorded new renditions of his past hits "Sealed with a Kiss" and "Rhythm of the Rain". Brian Eno produced a bonus track "Nobody But Me".

== Track listing ==
1. "Let It Be Me" (Gilbert Becaud/Pierre Delanoe/Manny Curtis)
2. "It's All in the Game" (Charles Gates Dawes/Carl Sigman)
3. "Smoke Gets in Your Eyes" (Otto Harbach/Jerome Kern)
4. "Halfway to Paradise" (Gerry Goffin/Carole King)
5. "Be My Baby" (Phil Spector/Jeff Barry/Ellie Greenwich)
6. "Dream Lover" (Bobby Darin)
7. "Sealed with a Kiss" (Peter Udell/Gary Geld)
8. "Blue Velvet" (Bernie Wayne/Lee Morris)
9. "Love Letters" (Edward Heyman/Victor Young)
10. "Sea Of Love" (Phil Phillips/George Khoury)
11. "Love Hurts" (Boudleaux Bryant)
12. "Rhythm of the Rain" (John Gummoe)
13. "If I Only Had Time" (Michel Fugain/Pierre Delanoe/Jack Fishman)
14. "Wondrous Place" (Jeff Lewis/Bill Giant)
15. "Lonesome Town" (Baker Knight)
16. "Dreamboats and Petticoats" (Jason Donovan/Tom Gilbert/Henry Preistman) (feat. Hank Marvin on guitar)
17. "All the Words We Don't Say" (Jason Donovan/Ian Brown/Anna Krantz)

== Charts ==
Chart performance for Let It Be Me
| Chart (2008) | Peak position |
|---|---|
| Scottish Albums (Official Charts) | 28 |
| UK Albums (Official Charts) | 28 |
