= Lino Carbosiero =

Lino Carbosiero MBE
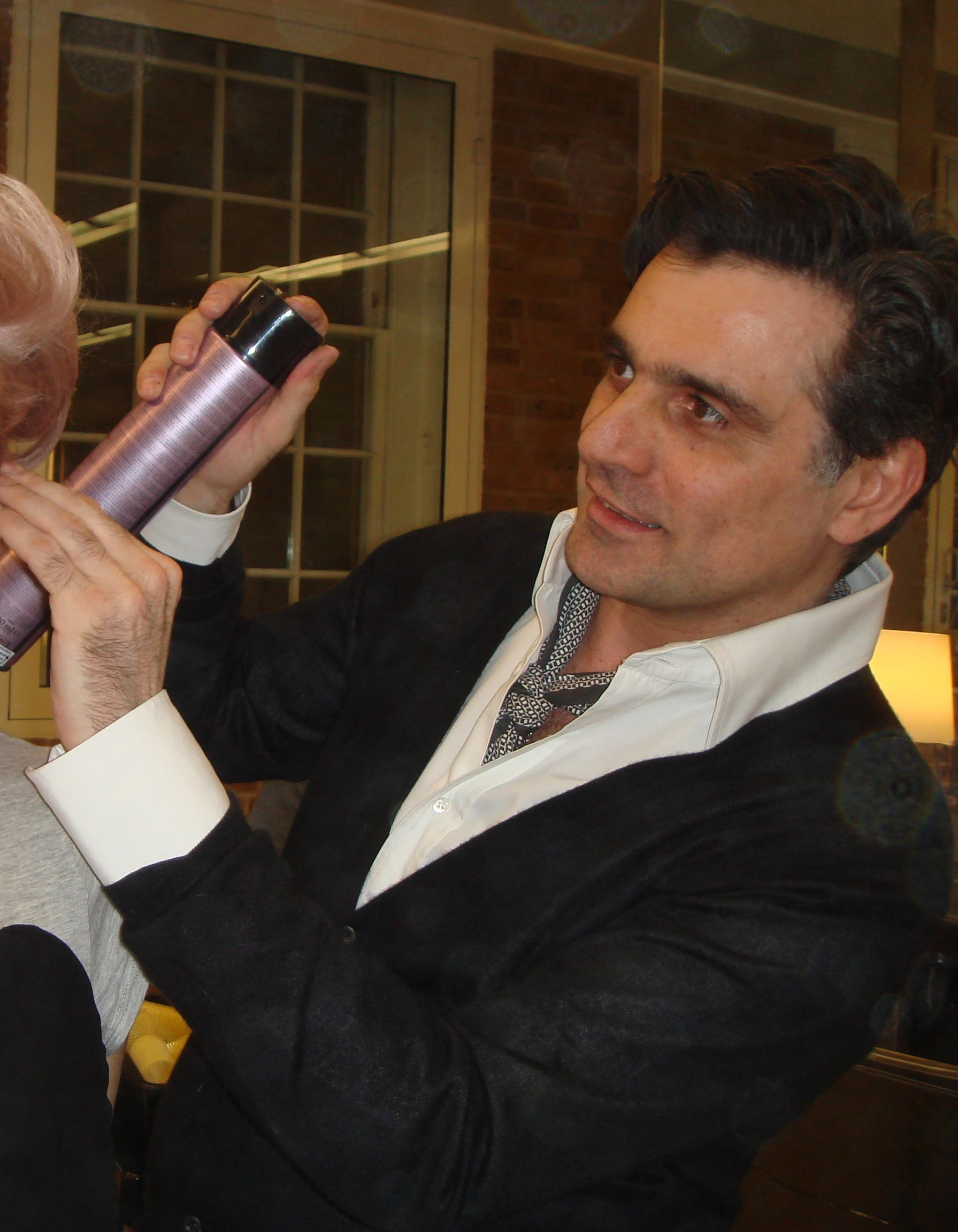
- Born: Raffaele Claudio Carbosiero; 9 June 1964 (age 62); Wokingham, Berkshire, UK
- Occupation: Hairdresser
- Years active: 1981–present
- Employer: Daniel Galvin
- Website: www.linocarbosiero.com

Raffaele Claudio Carbosiero MBE (born 9 June 1964), known as Lino Carbosiero, is a British hair stylist of Italian origin, currently working at the famous Daniel Galvin hair salon in London. He was appointed Member of the Order of the British Empire (MBE) in the 2014 New Year Honours for services to hairdressing.

== Career ==
In the years of salon ownership, Carbosiero forged a liaison with the 80s pop management team of Stock Aitken Waterman. Through the record company, he began to become notable in the music, television and fashion industries, working with artists such as Jason Donovan, who invited him to appear (as a dustman) in the video for his single "When You Come Back To Me", and Kylie Minogue, for whom he created the look on the cover of her debut album Kylie.

In 1993 he began working at the Daniel Galvin salon and has since worked backstage on a variety of films, TV shows, concerts, and West End shows. He was the head stylist for all of the contestants who appeared on the first three series of The X Factor and helped train Amanda Holden for her role in the BBC1 TV drama series about life in a hair salon, Cutting It.

In 2008, Lino became the personal hairdresser to the Right Honourable David Cameron and his wife Samantha, and has continued as such since Cameron became Prime Minister of the United Kingdom in 2010. Following renewed media interest in early 2014, Lino revealed that this style change was simply due to chance.

Carbosiero was drafted in to tend the locks of First Lady of the United States Melania Trump for the state visit with her husband Donald Trump.

Lino has been the global spokesperson for Avon International's hair care range and Style Director for both Brylcreem and Laross Hair Extensions. He also launched his own range of hair extensions with Annabelle's Wigs.

Carbosiero is also an Ambassador for the ARKS UK Charity and the Hairdressing Council.

== Media work ==
Carbosiero previously had his own weekly hairdressing column in The Sun, a monthly column in EasyJet Magazine, and gave hairdressing tips and advice to Candis Magazine and Hello Magazine.

He also featured in the successful Yummy Mummy Survival Guide Book by Liz Frazer, whilst the Kelly Osbourne book Fierce features a section of "Hair do's and Hair Don'ts" written by Lino. In 2008 Lino appeared in Britain's Missing Top Model on BBC Three whilst ITV's This Morning used him for a make-over slot on a segment called Bus Pass Beauty.
