= Ten Good Reasons =

1989 album by Jason Donovan

Studio album by Jason Donovan
- Released: 1 May 1989
- Studio: PWL (London, England)
- Genre: Pop
- Label: Mushroom; PWL
- Producer: Stock Aitken Waterman

Jason Donovan chronology
Ten Good Reasons (1989)	Between the Lines (1990)

Singles from Ten Good Reasons
- 1. "Nothing Can Divide Us" Released: 29 August 1988; 2. "Especially for You" Released: 28 November 1988; 3. "Too Many Broken Hearts" Released: 20 February 1989; 4. "Sealed with a Kiss" Released: 29 May 1989; 5. "Every Day (I Love You More)" Released: 28 August 1989

Professional ratings
Review scores
Source	Rating
AllMusic	2/5 stars
Record Mirror	4/5 stars

Ten Good Reasons is the debut studio album by Australian pop star and actor Jason Donovan. It was released on 1 May 1989 by Mushroom Records (Australia) and PWL Records (UK). It became the biggest selling album in the UK that year, and yielded three number-one singles, "Too Many Broken Hearts", "Sealed with a Kiss" and a duet with Kylie Minogue, "Especially for You". The album was reissued in 2010 as an expanded deluxe edition featuring B-sides and remixes. In 2016, the first CD of the 2010 reissue was reissued again as part of promotion for Donovan's Ten Good Reasons live shows. The album's title comes from a line in "Too Many Broken Hearts" - "you give me one good reason to leave me, I'll give you ten good reasons to stay".

== Critical reception ==
A review in Pan-European magazine Music & Media presented Ten Good Reasons like this: "Perfect music for eight to twelve-year-olds. Contains an interesting version of "Sealed With a Kiss" and the slushy duet with Kylie Minogue. Massive sales are guaranteed but it remains to be seen how long young Jason will be around". Music Week noted the tracks' similarities, stating: "As the SAW machine chums on, once again the songs remain the same... [They] sound like you've heard them before, but then that's why they sell. This formula is unlikely to fail". Tim Nicholson of Record Mirror admitted that the album "has no surprise", but added that "every track takes its lead from what's gone before. It's what's called 'giving the people what they want', and if it makes us happy, where's the harm in it?"

Retrospectively, in 2018, Mark Elliot of Classic Pop considered Ten Good Reasons as the 15th best album ever produced by Stock Aitken Waterman, considering it as a "hastily assembled pop confection".

== Chart performance ==
Ten Good Reasons entered the UK Albums Chart at number two, and then reached number one, staying there for four weeks. When his cover of Brian Hyland's "Sealed with a Kiss" entered the UK Singles Chart at number one, Donovan became the first Australian male to hold both UK singles and UK Albums Chart number-one positions simultaneously. The album peaked at number three on the European Albums Chart established by Music & Media and spent 42 weeks in the top 100. In Australia, it peaked at number five on its debut on the ARIA albums chart in June 1989, and became the 53rd highest selling album in Australia for 1989.

== Track listing ==
All tracks are written by Stock Aitken Waterman, except where indicated.

Ten Good Reasons track listing
No.	Title	Length
1.	"Too Many Broken Hearts"	3:29
2.	"Nothing Can Divide Us"	3:46
3.	"Every Day (I Love You More)"	3:25
4.	"You Can Depend on Me"	3:36
5.	"Time Heals"	3:09
6.	"Sealed with a Kiss" (writers: Peter Udell, Gary Geld)	2:32
7.	"Question of Pride"	3:16
8.	"If I Don't Have You"	3:01
9.	"Change Your Mind"	3:27
10.	"Too Late to Say Goodbye"	3:17
11.	"Especially for You" (Duet with Kylie Minogue)	4:00

2010 reissue bonus tracks
No.	Title	Writer(s)	Length
12.	"All I Wanna Do Is Make You Mine" (Duet with Kylie Minogue)		3:32
13.	"Wrap My Arms Around You"		3:41
14.	"I Guess She Never Loved Me"		3:32
15.	"Just Call Me Up"		3:13
16.	"Nothing Can Divide Us" (Extended Version)		5:29
17.	"Too Many Broken Hearts" (Extended Version)		5:46
18.	"Every Day (I Love You More)" (Extended Version)		5:44
19.	"Especially for You" (Extended Version)		4:59
20.	"Sealed with a Kiss" (Extended Version)	Udell; Geld	3:55

2010 reissue bonus disc 2: The Remixes
No.	Title	Writer(s)	Length
1.	"Especially for You" (Original 7" Mix)		3:30
2.	"Too Many Broken Hearts" (U.S. 7" Mix)		3:27
3.	"Every Day (I Love You More)" (7" Mix)		3:26
4.	"You Can Depend on Me" (Original Mix)		3:33
5.	"Nothing Can Divide Us" (Great Scott, It's the Remix)		6:08
6.	"Too Many Broken Hearts" (Urban Mix)		7:57
7.	"All I Wanna Do Is Make You Mine" (Extended Version)		6:01
8.	"Especially for You" (Original 12" Mix)		4:57
9.	"Too Many Broken Hearts" (Techno Mix)		5:10
10.	"Just Call Me Up" (Extended Version)		5:28
11.	"Nothing Can Divide Us" (Dub)		5:42
12.	"Too Many Broken Hearts" (Dub)		6:19
13.	"Nothing Can Divide Us" (7" Instrumental)		3:46
14.	"Especially for You" (Instrumental)		3:54
15.	"Too Many Broken Hearts" (7" Instrumental)		3:28
16.	"Sealed with a Kiss" (Instrumental)	Udell; Geld	2:32
17.	"Every Day (I Love You More)" (7" Instrumental)		3:25

== Charts ==
=== Weekly charts ===
Weekly chart performance for Ten Good Reasons
Chart (1989)	Peak position
Australian Albums (ARIA)	5
Austrian Albums (Ö3 Austria)	20
Dutch Albums (Album Top 100)	21
Europe (European Top 100 Albums)	3
Finnish Albums (Suomen virallinen lista)	3
French Albums (SNEP)	26
German Albums (Offizielle Top 100)	3
Irish Albums (IRMA)	1
New Zealand Albums (RMNZ)	4
Spanish Albums	30
Swedish Albums (Sverigetopplistan)	29
Swiss Albums (Schweizer Hitparade)	20
UK Albums (OCC)	1

=== Year-end charts ===
Year-end chart performance for Ten Good Reasons
Chart (1989)	Rank
Australian Albums (ARIA)	53
European Albums (European Top 100 Albums)	17
German Albums (Offizielle Deutsche Charts)	22
New Zealand Albums (Recorded Music NZ)	48
UK Albums (Gallup)	1

== Certifications ==
Certifications for Ten Good Reasons
Region	Certification	Certified units/sales
Australia (ARIA)	Platinum	70,000^{^}
Finland (Musiikkituottajat)	Platinum	63,815
Germany (BVMI)	Gold	250,000^{^}
Hong Kong (IFPI Hong Kong)	Gold	10,000^{*}
New Zealand (RMNZ)	Platinum	15,000^{^}
Spain (Promusicae)	Gold	50,000^{^}
Switzerland (IFPI Switzerland)	Gold	25,000^{^}
United Kingdom (BPI)	5× Platinum	1,680,651
^{*} Sales figures based on certification alone.^{^} Shipments figures based on certification alone.
