= Rhythm of the Rain =

1962 single by the Cascades

Single by the Cascades

from the album Rhythm of the Rain
- B-side: "Let Me Be"
- Released: November 1962
- Recorded: 1962
- Genre: Pop
- Length: 2:28
- Label: Valiant 6026
- Songwriter: John Claude Gummoe
- Producer: Barry De Vorzon

The Cascades singles chronology
"There's a Reason" (1962)	"Rhythm of the Rain" (1962)	"Shy Girl" (1963)

Official audio
- "Rhythm of the Rain" on YouTube

"Rhythm of the Rain" is a song performed by American vocal group the Cascades, released in November 1962 in the US and on January 25, 1963 in the UK. It was written by Cascades band member John Claude Gummoe. On March 9, 1963, it rose to number 3 on the Billboard Hot 100, and spent two weeks at number 1 on Billboard's Easy Listening chart. Billboard ranked the record as the number 4 song of 1963.

In March 1963, the song was a top 5 hit in the United Kingdom and, in May that same year, was a number 1 single in Ireland. In Australia it rose to number 2. In Canada, the song was on the CHUM Chart for a total of 12 weeks and reached number 1 in February 1963. In 1999 BMI listed the song as the 9th most performed song on radio/TV in the 20th century.

The Cascades' recording was used in the soundtrack of the 1979 film Quadrophenia, and included in its soundtrack album.

The song arrangement features distinctive use of a celesta played by arranger, Perry Botkin Jr. Other musicians on the record include Wrecking Crew members Hal Blaine on drums, Carol Kaye on bass, and Glen Campbell on guitar.

The sound of rain and thunder are heard at the beginning and at the end of the song.

== Theme ==
The lyrics are sung by a man whose lover has left him; the rain falling reminds him 'what a fool' he has been. He rhetorically asks the rain for answers, but ultimately he wishes it would 'go away' and let him cry alone.

== Chart performance ==
=== Weekly charts ===
Chart (1963)	Peak position
Australia (Sydney)	3
Belgium (Flanders)	14
Belgium (Wallonia)	23
Canada (CHUM Hit Parade)	1
Ireland (IRMA)	1
New Zealand (Lever Hit Parade)	2
Norway (VG-lista)	7
UK Record Retailer	5
US Billboard Hot 100	3
US Billboard Middle-Road Singles	1
US Billboard Hot R&B Singles	7
US Cash Box Top 100	2

=== Year-end charts ===
Chart (1963)	Rank
US Billboard Hot 100	4
US Cash Box	7

== Sylvie Vartan version (in French) ==
"En écoutant la pluie"

Single by Sylvie Vartan

from the album Twiste et chante
- Language: French
- English title: Listening to the Rain
- B-side: "Jamais"
- Released: April 1963
- Genre: Yé-yé
- Length: 2:28
- Label: RCA Victor
- Songwriters: John C. Gummoe, Richard Anthony

Sylvie Vartan singles chronology
"Chance" / "Il revient" / "Reponds-moi" / "Il revient" / "Reponds-moi" / "Tous les gens" (1963)	"En écoutant la pluie" (1963)	"I'm watching" (1963)

The song was adapted into French (under the title "En écoutant la pluie", meaning "Listening to the Rain") by Richard Anthony. It was recorded by Sylvie Vartan, who released it as a single in April 1963 as the lead off of her second studio album, Twiste et chante, released that July.

According to the charts published by the U.S. magazine Billboard (in its "Hits of the World" section), the song "En écoutant la pluie" reached number one in France.

=== Track listings ===
7-inch single RCA Victor 45.277 (1963, France)

A. "En écoutant la pluie" (Rhythm of the Rain)
B. "Jamais" (Late Date Baby)

7-inch EP Sylvie à l'Olympia RCA 86.007 (1963, France)

A1. "En écoutant la pluie"
A2. "Jamais"
B1. "Avec moi"
B2. "Mon ami"

=== Charts ===
Charts (1963)	Peak position
Belgium (Ultratop 50 Wallonia)	11
France	1

== Other charting versions ==
- Dutch teen idol Rob de Nijs covered the song in 1963 as "Ritme van de regen". Though originally a B side, the song kick started his career and remains popular today.
- Gary Lewis & the Playboys released a version of the song in 1969 that reached No. 63 on the Billboard Hot 100 chart, and No. 37 in Canada, their last charting single there.
- Pat Roberts released a version of the song in 1972 that reached No. 34 on the Country chart.
- Jacky Ward released a version of the song in 1978 that reached No. 11 on the Country chart.
- Neil Sedaka released a version of the song in 1984 that reached No. 37 on the adult contemporary chart.
- Dan Fogelberg released a version of the song in 1990 that reached No. 3 on the adult contemporary chart.
- Jason Donovan also recorded a version of the song for his 1990 album Between the Lines, and released it as the fourth single on 20 August 1990. It reached number nine on the UK Singles Chart (returning him to the top 10 after his previous single "Another Night" only reached number 18), number six in Ireland, number 14 in the Flanders part of Belgium, number 25 in Finland, number 38 in Germany and number 44 in Australia. Reviewing the single, David Giles of Music Week said that "SAW have managed to capture some of the original charm, without damaging [Donovan's] chances of maintaining the flow of hits". Donovan re-recorded the song for his 2008 album Let It Be Me.

== See also ==
- List of number-one adult contemporary singles of 1963 (U.S.)
- List of number-one singles of 1963 (Ireland)
- List of 1960s one-hit wonders in the United States
