= Every Day (I Love You More) =

Single by Jason Donovan

from the album Ten Good Reasons
- B-side: "I Guess She Never Loved Me"
- Released: 28 August 1989
- Genre: Pop, dance-pop
- Length: 3:24
- Label: PWL
- Songwriter: Stock Aitken Waterman
- Producer: Stock Aitken Waterman

Jason Donovan singles chronology
"Sealed with a Kiss" (1989)	"Every Day (I Love You More)" (1989)	"When You Come Back to Me" (1989)

Music video
- "Every Day (I Love You More)" on YouTube

"Every Day (I Love You More)" is a 1989 song recorded by the Australian singer Jason Donovan. It was released on 28 August 1989 as the fifth and final single from his debut album, Ten Good Reasons. As with Donovan's other songs at the time, it was written and produced by Stock Aitken Waterman. It was the least successful release from the album, although it was a hit in the UK and Ireland.

== Background and release ==
"Everyday (I Love You More)" was intended to be the follow-up to the number one hit, "Too Many Broken Hearts", but Pete Waterman switched its release so that it followed "Sealed With a Kiss" instead. A brand new song, "I Guess She Never Loved Me" was recorded as the B-side, and has received praise for Donovan's vocal performance.

== Music video ==
Due to "Every Day" being the intended follow-up to "Too Many Broken Hearts", two videos ended up being shot for the song, with the first recorded back-to-back with the video for "Sealed With A Kiss," during a single night of filming, and using the same artificial beach set. That video, which featured a poorly-received dance sequence, was rejected by Donovan's record label and has never been released to the public. The second video was shot in the UK, and features an obscured, rear-view cameo from the singer's then-girlfriend Kylie Minogue.

== Chart performance ==
"Every Day (I Love You More)" started at number three on the UK Singles Chart on 9 September 1989, then climbed to a peak of number two, and remained on the chart for ten weeks. It also reached number one in Ireland where it charted for five weeks, becoming Donovan's fourth consecutive number-one hit there. In Continental Europe, it peaked inside the top ten in Luxembourg, the Flanders region of Belgium and Finland, at numbers one, six and eight, respectively, was a top-16 hit in Denmark, and peaked at number 19 out of a 20-week chart run in Germany, reaching this position in its third week. By contrast, it had a weak chart trajectory in France and the Netherlands, stalling at numbers 37 and 47 in these nations. On the pan-Eurochart Hot 100 singles chart compiled by Music & Media, it started at number 11 on 16 September 1989, attained number six the next week, and was present on the chart for ten weeks. Much aired on the UK radios where it reached number one the airplay chart, it appeared for eight weeks on the European Airplay Top 50, with a peak at number 28 in its third week.

"Every Day (I Love You More)" was a moderate hit in the Oceanian markets: the track culminated at number 43 in Australia with a three-week chart run, thus becoming Donovan's first single to fail to crack the Australian top 40 after a run of four top 10 hits, and marked the abrupt end of the artist's status as a major pop star in his home country. Similarly, it missed the top 40 by one place in New Zealand, with two weeks of charting.

== Track listings ==
- 7" single

A. "Every Day (I Love You More)" — 3:24
B. "I Guess She Never Loved Me" — 3:30

- 12" maxi

A. "Every Day (I Love You More)" — 5:42
B1. "I Guess She Never Loved Me" — 3:30
B2. "Every Day (I Love You More)" (7" version) — 3:23

- Cassette Single

A. "Every Day (I Love You More)" — 3:24
B. "I Guess She Never Loved Me" — 3:30

- CD maxi
1. "Every Day (I Love You More)" (7" version) — 3:24
2. "Every Day (I Love You More)" (12" version) — 5:42
3. "I Guess She Never Loved Me" — 3:30

== Credits ==
- Backing vocals : Mae McKenna, Mike Stock and Miriam Stockley
- Engineer : Karen Hewitt and Yoyo
- Guitars : Matt Aitken
- Keyboards : Matt Aitken and Mike Stock
- Mixed by Pete Hammond
- Producer Stock, Aitken and Waterman
- Design : David Howells
- Hair : Lino Carbosiero
- Photography : Simon Fowler

== Charts ==
=== Weekly charts ===
Weekly chart performance for "Every Day (I Love You More)"
Chart (1989–1990)	Peak position
Australia (ARIA)	43
Austria (Airplay Top 20)	5
Belgium (Ultratop 50 Flanders)	6
Denmark (IFPI)	15
Europe (Eurochart Hot 100)	6
Europe (European Airplay Top 50)	28
Finland (Suomen virallinen lista)	8
France (SNEP)	37
Ireland (IRMA)	1
Luxembourg (Radio Luxembourg)	1
Netherlands (Single Top 100)	47
New Zealand (Recorded Music NZ)	41
Spain (Airplay Top 20)	7
UK Singles (Official Charts)	2
UK Indie (Top 40 Singles)	1
West Germany (GfK)	19

=== Year-end charts ===
Year-end chart performance for "Every Day (I Love You More)"
Chart (1989)	Position
Belgium (Ultratop)	58
UK Singles (OCC)	92
