= When You Come Back to Me (Jason Donovan song) =

Single by Jason Donovan

from the album Between the Lines
- B-side: "When You Come Back to Me" (instrumental)
- Released: 27 November 1989
- Studio: PWL (London)
- Genre: Pop, dance-pop
- Length: 3:34
- Label: PWL
- Songwriters: Mike Stock, Matt Aitken, Pete Waterman
- Producer: Stock, Aitken & Waterman

Jason Donovan singles chronology
"Every Day (I Love You More)" (1989)	"When You Come Back to Me" (1989)	"Hang On to Your Love" (1990)

Music video
- "When You Come Back to Me" on YouTube

"When You Come Back to Me" is a song recorded by Australian artist and actor Jason Donovan. It was released on 27 November 1989 as the first single from his second album Between the Lines. It charted in the UK on 9 December 1989, peaking at number two the following week and returning to the same position in January 1990, becoming one of his biggest selling singles in Britain. Reaching a disappointing number 40 in Australia, the track was Jason's final top 40 chart hit in his home country.

== Background ==
As with all Donovan's early recordings, "When You Come Back to Me" was written and produced by the production team Stock, Aitken & Waterman. In addition, Matt Aitken contributed guitar; Mike Stock provided backing vocals, and both played keyboards on the track.

The track was deliberately composed to evoke the Christmas season in the UK, without making any explicit auditory or lyrical references. Composer Mike Stock did not want to write a song that was "exploitative of the Christmas message" and was conscious an overtly festive song would go quickly out of date after Christmas had finished. However the song's evocation of a London Christmas has been blamed for its chart failure in Australia, where the track received a January 1990 release.

An instrumental version and three remixes augmented the standard edit for the single release.

== Critical reception ==
In 2017, Christian Guiltenane of British magazine Attitude considered the song as "an absolutely delightful sing-song that has choral oohs in the background 'nah nah nahs' in the chorus". In 2019, James Masterton wrote it was "arguably one of the best pop singles Stock-Aitken-Waterman would ever create", adding that it was "crafted as a seasonal epic. The lavish production combined a Phil Spector-esque wall of sound with a tinkling melody, festive chimes and mixed it with a suitable festive lyrical theme"; however, Masterton lamented about the fact that the song he called a "forgotten gem" never became a Christmas classic throughout the years.

== Track listings ==
- 7" single (PWL46)

A. "When You Come Back to Me" – 3:31
B. "When You Come Back to Me" (instrumental) – 3:33

- 7" single poster bag (PWLP46)

A. "When You Come Back to Me" (the Yuletide Sleigh List Mix mix) – 4:40
B. "When You Come Back to Me" (instrumental) – 3:33

- 7" single picture disc (PWLX46)

A. "When You Come Back to Me" – 3:31
B. "When You Come Back to Me" (instrumental) – 3:33

- 12" single (PWLT46)

A. "When You Come Back to Me (extended)" – 5:48
B1. "When You Come Back to Me (No Probs mix) – 5:34
B2. "When You Come Back to Me (instrumental) – 3:33

- Cassette Single (PWMC46)
1. "When You Come Back to Me" – 3:31
2. "When You Come Back to Me" (instrumental) – 3:33
- CD Single (PWCD46)
1. "When You Come Back to Me" – 3:31
2. "When You Come Back to Me" (extended) – 5:48
3. "When You Come Back to Me" (instrumental) – 3:33

Note: Mixed by Dave Ford, the "instrumental" version is not the instrumental of the single version to which it accompanied, but rather a stripped back guitar orientated version, identified on the 2009 iTunes releases as the "Guitar instrumental".

== Charts ==
=== Weekly charts ===
Weekly chart performance for "When You Come Back to Me"
Chart (1989–1990)	Peak position
Australia (ARIA)	40
Austria (Airplay Top 20)	14
Belgium (Ultratop 50 Flanders)	6
Canada Adult Contemporary (RPM)	31
Denmark (IFPI)	14
Europe (Eurochart Hot 100)	4
Finland (Suomen virallinen lista)	1
Ireland (IRMA)	1
Luxembourg (Radio Luxembourg)	2
Netherlands (Dutch Top 40)	22
Netherlands (Single Top 100)	20
Spain (AFYVE)	15
UK Singles (Official Charts)	2
West Germany (GfK)	36

=== Year-end charts ===
1989 year-end chart performance for "When You Come Back to Me"
Chart (1989)	Position
UK Singles (OCC)	37

1990 year-end chart performance for "When You Come Back to Me"
Chart (1990)	Position
Belgium (Ultratop)	72

== Certifications ==
Certifications for "When You Come Back to Me"
Region	Certification	Certified units/sales
United Kingdom (BPI)	Gold	400,000^{^}
^{^} Shipments figures based on certification alone.
