= Especially for You =

1988 single by Kylie Minogue and Jason Donovan

Single by Kylie Minogue and Jason Donovan

from the album Ten Good Reasons
- B-side: "All I Wanna Do Is Make You Mine"
- Released: 28 November 1988
- Studio: Rhinoceros (Sydney, Australia); PWL (London, England)
- Genre: Pop
- Length: 4:01
- Label: PWL
- Songwriters: Mike Stock; Matt Aitken; Pete Waterman
- Producer: Stock Aitken Waterman

Kylie Minogue singles chronology
"Je ne sais pas pourquoi" (1988)	"Especially for You" (1988)	"It's No Secret" (1988)

Jason Donovan singles chronology
"Nothing Can Divide Us" (1988)	"Especially for You" (1988)	"Too Many Broken Hearts" (1989)

Music video
- "Especially for You" on YouTube

"Especially for You" is a song performed by Australian recording artists Kylie Minogue and Jason Donovan from Donovan's debut album, Ten Good Reasons (1989). The song was released as his album's second single on 28 November 1988 and was written and produced by Stock Aitken Waterman (SAW). It was also included on the North American edition of Minogue's second studio album, Enjoy Yourself (1989).

The song had commercial success, reaching number one in the UK, Ireland, Greece, and Belgium and peaking inside the top five in several other countries, including Australia, New Zealand, France, Finland, and Switzerland.

== Background ==
Minogue and Donovan had both appeared on the hit Australian TV series Neighbours, building a considerable following as an onscreen couple in both Australia and the UK. They were also the subject of much media and public speculation about their off-screen romance, which at the time of this release they were still denying, in an effort to protect their privacy.

Minogue had released the album Kylie, while Donovan was working on his debut album Ten Good Reasons. Both singers were produced by Mike Stock, Matt Aitken and Pete Waterman, fuelling speculation in the British press that they were planning to release a duet. SAW and the two singers all denied any plan to do so, with the producers fearing the project would be too "crass" and "commercial", and Minogue expressing concerns a duet would again stir up unwelcome interest in her romance with Donovan.

However, interest continued to rise, as the proposed track was anticipated to coincide with the wedding of Kylie and Jason's TV characters, Charlene Mitchell and Scott Robinson, on British TV, and would also be a strong contender for Christmas number one on the UK charts. An order of 250,000 copies by British retailer Woolworths finally forced the producers to make the record, with the team feeling they could not shun that scale of demand from the market.

The song's title was inspired by a greeting card, with Stock and Aitken fleshing out the lyrics along that theme. With time running short, Aitken and Waterman flew to Sydney to record the vocals with Minogue and Donovan, with the session running all night. Work on mixing was then done in London, with Waterman saying he and Stock hated the first completed version so much that he considered completely dumping the record. A last minute remix by engineer Pete Hammond, which changed the drums and moved the harmony vocals to the opening of the track, satisfied the team and the track was then rushed to release.

The song was released as a single on 28 November 1988 in the UK, and was later included on both Donovan's debut album, and the North American version of Minogue's second album, Enjoy Yourself. The song was used in Neighbours on two occasions: Firstly in September 2018 for David Tanaka (Takaya Honda) and Aaron Brennan's (Matt Wilson) wedding, which was the first same-sex marriage for the serial and the first to be screened on Australian television. The song was used again in July 2022 for the series' then-finale episode, which Donovan and Minogue reprised their respective roles as Scott and Charlene.

== Impact and legacy ==
According to AllMusic biographer Neil Z. Yeung, "Especially for You" was critically panned upon its initial release. In 2014, Matt Dunn of WhatCulture ranked the song at number four in his "15 unforgettable Stock Aitken Waterman singles" list. In 2015, the song was voted by the British public as the nation's 20th favourite 1980s number one in a poll for ITV, and in 2021, Classic Pop magazine ranked it number 23 in their list of "Top 40 Stock Aitken Waterman songs". In 2023, Robert Moran of Australian daily tabloid newspaper The Sydney Morning Herald ranked the song as Minogue's 75th best song (out of 183), a duet he found better than the one with Nick Cave. In 2025, Thomas Edward of Smooth Radio ranked the song number one in his list of "Stock Aitken Waterman's 15 greatest songs, ranked".

== Chart performance ==
"Especially for You" debuted at number two in Australia and stayed at that position for four consecutive weeks. This marked Donovan's highest peak in Australia, but not Minogue's, who had set a record with her first three singles reaching number one, and who then went on to have seven more number ones. In New Zealand, the song debuted at number four, and peaked at number two. To date, this is Donovan's only single to peak in the top twenty, and was at the time Minogue's longest-charting single in that country, staying for 21 weeks, before being surpassed by "Can't Get You Out of My Head" (2001), which peaked at number one. The song then debuted at number two on the UK Singles Chart, staying there for four weeks, rising to number one for three consecutive weeks. The song stayed in the chart for 14 weeks in total. It was Minogue's second number-one out of eight, and Donovan's first of four. In 2014 the song became one of only 154 singles in UK Official Charts History to reach 1 million sales.

In the European markets, the song debuted at number 39 on the French Singles Chart and rose to number three for two consecutive weeks. This was Minogue's highest peaking single in France until 2001's "Can't Get You Out of My Head". The song debuted at number 73 on the Dutch Top 40, peaking at number four for a sole week, and was her highest peaking song until "Can't Get You Out of My Head". The song spent a sole week at number ten in Norway. The song had debuted at number 15 in Sweden, until peaking at number twelve for a solitary week. In Switzerland, the song peaked at number two for a single week, staying in the charts for fifteen weeks. This was Minogue's highest peaking song until "Can't Get You Out of My Head". The song peaked at number twelve in Austria for one week. "Especially for You" was Minogue's biggest-selling single in the United Kingdom until 2001's "Can't Get You Out of My Head". The duet is also the bestselling Stock Aitken Waterman-penned single, selling more than one million copies to date as of December 2014.

== Live performances ==
Minogue performed the song on the following concert tours:

- Showgirl: The Greatest Hits Tour
- Showgirl: The Homecoming Tour
- Aphrodite World Tour 2011 (only performed during her tour in Manila upon request)
- Kiss Me Once Tour (performed upon request in Liverpool)
- A Kylie Christmas at the Royal Albert Hall
- Golden Tour
- Summer 2019

The song was also performed on:

- An Audience with Kylie Minogue 2001 TV special, a duet with Kermit the Frog.
- Sport Relief 2014 duet with David Walliams.

Donovan performed the song on the following concert tours:

- Doin' Fine Tour 1990
- Ten Good Reasons & Greatest Hits Tour 2016

On 21 December 2012, Kylie Minogue and Jason Donovan performed the song at the Hit Factory Live concert, their first performance together since 1989. On 9 September 2018, Donovan joined Minogue on stage to perform the song as part of Minogue's headlining set at Radio 2 Live in Hyde Park.

== Track listings ==
- CD single
1. "Especially for You" (extended) – 5:01
2. "All I Wanna Do Is Make You Mine" (extended) – 6:00
3. "Especially for You" – 3:58
- 7-inch single
1. "Especially for You" – 3:58
2. "All I Wanna Do Is Make You Mine" – 3:34
- 12-inch single
1. "Especially for You" (extended) – 5:01
2. "All I Wanna Do Is Make You Mine" (extended) – 6:00
- 7-inch & Cassette single 2022 Reissue
1. "Especially for You" - 3:58
2. "Especially for You" (Instrumental) - 3:55

== Charts ==
=== Weekly charts ===
1988–1989 weekly chart performance for "Especially for You"
Chart (1988–1989)	Peak position
Australia (ARIA)	2
Austria (Ö3 Austria Top 40)	12
Belgium (Ultratop 50 Flanders)	5
Belgium (Ultratop 40 Wallonia)	1
Europe (Eurochart Hot 100)	1
Europe (European Airplay Top 50)	1
Finland (Suomen virallinen lista)	4
France (SNEP)	3
Greece (IFPI)	3
Ireland (IRMA)	1
Luxembourg (Radio Luxembourg)	1
Netherlands (Dutch Top 40)	6
Netherlands (Single Top 100)	4
New Zealand (Recorded Music NZ)	2
Norway (VG-lista)	10
Portugal (AFP)	2
Sweden (Sverigetopplistan)	12
Switzerland (Schweizer Hitparade)	2
UK Singles (Official Charts)	1
West Germany (GfK)	10

=== Year-end charts ===
1988 year-end chart performance for "Especially for You"
Chart (1988)	Position
UK Singles (OCC)	4

1989 year-end chart performance for "Especially for You"
Chart (1989)	Position
Australia (ARIA)	17
Belgium (Ultratop 50 Flanders)	26
Europe (Eurochart Hot 100)	13
Netherlands (Dutch Top 40)	48
Netherlands (Single Top 100)	53
New Zealand (RIANZ)	14
Switzerland (Schweizer Hitparade)	22
UK Singles (OCC)	32
West Germany (Media Control)	60

== Certifications and sales ==
Certifications for "Especially for You"
Region	Certification	Certified units/sales
Australia (ARIA)	Gold	35,000^{^}
France (SNEP)	Silver	200,000^{*}
Malaysia	—	8,000
United Kingdom (BPI)	Platinum	1,090,000
^{*} Sales figures based on certification alone.^{^} Shipments figures based on certification alone.
