= Too Many Broken Hearts =

1989 single by Jason Donovan

Single by Jason Donovan

from the album Ten Good Reasons
- B-side: "Wrap My Arms Around You"
- Released: 20 February 1989
- Studio: PWL 1 and 4 (London, England)
- Length: 3:30: 3:11 (video version)
- Label: Mushroom, PWL
- Songwriter: Stock Aitken Waterman
- Producer: Stock Aitken Waterman

Jason Donovan singles chronology
"Especially for You" (1988)	"Too Many Broken Hearts" (1989)	"Sealed with a Kiss" (1989)

Music video
- "Too Many Broken Hearts" on YouTube

"Too Many Broken Hearts" is a song by Australian singer and actor Jason Donovan, released on 20 February 1989 as the third single from his debut album, Ten Good Reasons (1989), and 1991's Greatest Hits album and again on a later collection in 2006. The song reached number-one in the United Kingdom and Ireland in March 1989. The song additionally peaked within the top 10 in Australia, Denmark, France, the Netherlands, Norway and Spain.

== Background ==
Written and produced by Stock Aitken Waterman (SAW), the song attracted some media controversy after producer Pete Waterman claimed he "wrote the song on the toilet in ten minutes". The claim has been dismissed by the song's actual composer, Mike Stock, who says Waterman only supplied a rough title idea for the song.

Donovan said he recorded sections of the song on different days, describing the process as "pop singing by numbers". He initially had no idea the track would go on to be so successful, and thought it might just be an album track. However, he now regards it as one of SAW's best songs, as well as being his defining hit.

== Music video ==
The accompanying music video for "Too Many Broken Hearts" was filmed in Falls Creek, Victoria, and featured Donovan strumming an unpowered electric guitar in the outdoors, while interacting with an apparent love interest. The guitar scenes generated some media scorn — including a parody on TV show Hey Hey It's Saturday — and were also slammed by singer Boy George, who accused Donovan of trying to look like a rock star.

The singer's romantic interest in the video was a local woman known to the director, Chris Langman, who had never acted or modelled before. He insists she was not cast due to her widely perceived resemblance to Kylie Minogue. The mountain shack featured in the video belonged to Langman at the time, and he chose both the shooting location and the actress out of convenience.

Donovan stated he was initially underwhelmed by the video, and was surprised by the ecstatic response it earned from his UK label. The video proved highly popular with fans, with Waterman saying its emotionally uplifting scenes and sunny landscapes represented "hope" to young people in Britain.

== Critical reception ==
=== Initial response ===
Richard Lowe from Smash Hits wrote, "This is something of a landmark in the history of pop. Blow me down if it isn't the first ever single written and produced by Stock, Aitken & Waterman, to open up not with the familiar boom boom dommph fli-di-di-dum-dum roll but with what can only be described as a "guitar lick". It soon falls into familiar territory though. It's a great pop tune, Jason sings it perfectly adequately and it's bound to be a really big hit."

=== Impact and legacy ===
Retrospectively, in 2014, Matt Dunn of WhatCulture ranked the song at number 7 in his "15 unforgettable Stock Aitken Waterman singles" list. In 2019, James Masterton described it "one of the most appealing, immediately infectious and masterful pop singles of the Stock-Aitken-Waterman production team had put together to date". In 2021, British magazine Classic Pop ranked the song number 19 in their list of 'Top 40 Stock Aitken Waterman songs', adding that "few could resist the dreamy good looks of Jason strumming his red Gibson atop the hill in the video".

== Track listings ==
- 7-inch and cassette single
1. "Too Many Broken Hearts" – 3:26
2. "Wrap My Arms Around You" – 3:40
- 12-inch single

A1. "Too Many Broken Hearts" (extended version)
B1. "Wrap My Arms Around You"
B2. "Too Many Broken Hearts" (instrumental)

- 12-inch remix single

A1. "Too Many Broken Hearts" (techno mix)
B1. "Too Many Broken Hearts" (extended version)
B2. "Wrap My Arms Around You"

- CD single
1. "Too Many Broken Hearts" (extended version)
2. "Wrap My Arms Around You"
3. "Nothing Can Divide Us"
- US 12-inch single

A1. "Too Many Broken Hearts" (urban mix) – 8:00
A2. "Too Many Broken Hearts" (techno mix) – 5:10
A3. "Too Many Broken Hearts" (edit) – 3:26
B1. "Too Many Broken Hearts" (Party Hardy mix) – 6:25
B2. "Too Many Broken Hearts" (extended mix) – 5:45

== Credits and personnel ==
Credits are lifted from the UK CD single liner notes.

Studio

- Recorded at PWL Studios 1 and 4 (London, England)

Personnel

- Stock Aitken Waterman – writing, production, arrangement
  - Mike Stock – backing vocals, keyboards
  - Matt Aitken – guitars, keyboards
- Mae McKenna – backing vocals
- Miriam Stockley – backing vocals
- George De Angelis – additional keyboards
- A. Linn – drums
- Mixmaster Pete Hammond – mixing
- Karen Hewitt – engineering
- Yoyo – engineering
- David Howells – design
- Lawrence Lawry – photography

== Charts ==
=== Weekly charts ===
Weekly chart performance for "Too Many Broken Hearts"
Chart (1989)	Peak position
Australia (ARIA)	7
Belgium (Ultratop 50 Flanders)	2
Denmark (IFPI)	10
Europe (Eurochart Hot 100)	5
Finland (Suomen virallinen lista)	6
France (SNEP)	5
Ireland (IRMA)	1
Luxembourg (Radio Luxembourg)	1
Netherlands (Dutch Top 40)	3
Netherlands (Single Top 100)	3
New Zealand (Recorded Music NZ)	21
Norway (VG-lista)	10
Spain (AFYVE)	10
Sweden (Sverigetopplistan)	13
Switzerland (Schweizer Hitparade)	27
UK Singles (Official Charts)	1
US 12-inch Singles Sales (Billboard)	39
West Germany (GfK)	16

=== Year-end charts ===
Year-end chart performance for "Too Many Broken Hearts"
Chart (1989)	Position
Australia (ARIA)	76
Belgium (Ultratop)	22
Europe (Eurochart Hot 100)	31
Netherlands (Single Top 100)	52
UK Singles (OCC)	4
West Germany (Media Control)	70

== Certifications ==
Certifications for "Too Many Broken Hearts"
Region	Certification	Certified units/sales
Australia (ARIA)	Gold	35,000^{^}
France (SNEP)	Silver	200,000^{*}
United Kingdom (BPI)	Gold	400,000^{^}
^{*} Sales figures based on certification alone.^{^} Shipments figures based on certification alone.
