= Jason Donovan =

Australian actor and singer (born 1968)

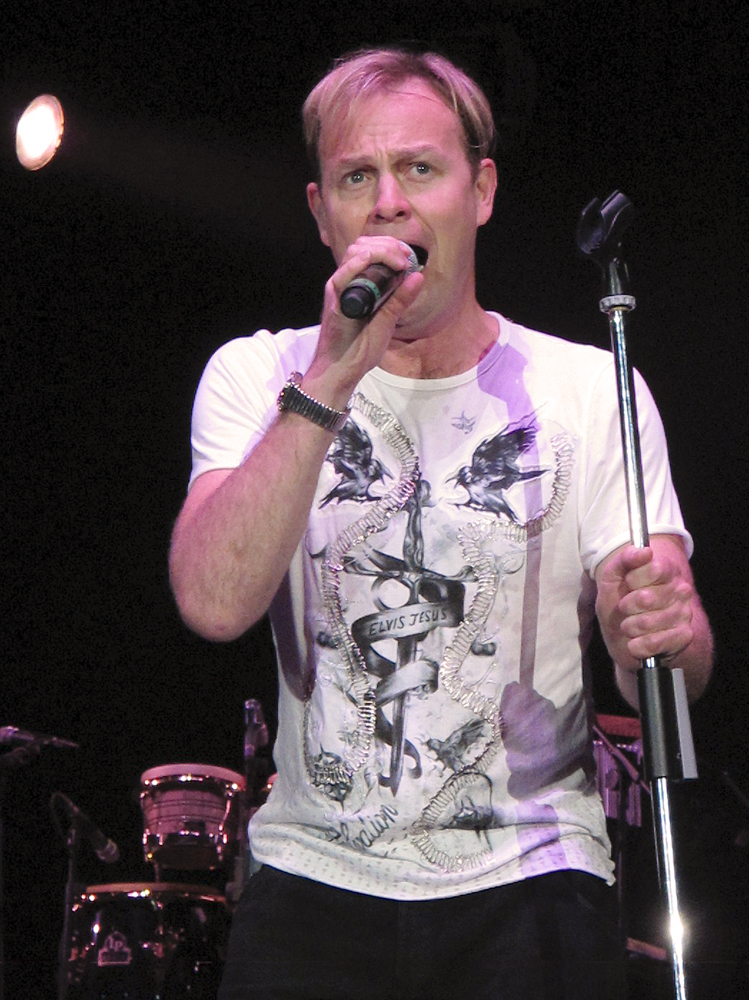
- Donovan in 2011
- Born: 1 June 1968 (age 58); Malvern, Victoria, Australia
- Occupations: Actor; singer
- Years active: 1980–present
- Television: Neighbours; MDA
- Spouse: Angela Malloch (m. 2008)
- Children: 3, including Jemma Donovan
- Parent(s): Terence Donovan (father); Sue Menlove (mother)
- Relatives: Stephanie McIntosh (half-sister)
- Musical career
- Genre: Pop
- Instrument: Vocals
- Years active: 1988–present
- Labels: PWL; Polydor; UMTV
- Website: jasondonovan.com

Jason Sean Donovan (born 1 June 1968) is an Australian actor and singer. He initially achieved fame in the Australian soap Neighbours, playing Scott Robinson, before beginning a career in music. In 1988 Jason was signed to the record label PWL. He has sold an estimated 3 million records. His debut album Ten Good Reasons was the highest-selling album in the UK in 1989, with sales of over 1.5 million. He has had four UK No. 1 singles (including a duet) and features on the 1989 Band Aid charity single. He has appeared in several stage musicals, most prominently in the lead role of Joseph and the Amazing Technicolor Dreamcoat in the early 1990s.

== Early life ==
Jason Donovan was born on 1 June 1968 in the Melbourne suburb Malvern, Victoria. He is the son of Australian actress Sue McIntosh (née Menlove) and British-born veteran stage and television actor Terence Donovan (who also appeared in Neighbours), who had English and Irish heritage. Following his parents' separation and divorce, his father was awarded full custody of him in 1973 and brought him up on his own, Terence died on 18 July 2026 at the age of 90. He attended De La Salle College Malvern.

== Career ==
=== 1980–1989: Television career and Neighbours ===
Donovan made his first television appearance at age 11 in a guest role on the Australian series Skyways in 1980. In the episode, his on-screen sister was played by future Neighbours co-star Kylie Minogue. He also appeared in the series I Can Jump Puddles (1981) and Golden Pennies (1985), before entering the cast of Neighbours in 1986 as Scott Robinson (replacing actor Darius Perkins, who had played the role for the first year of the series). His character's story arcs included an onscreen romance and wedding to Charlene Mitchell (played by Minogue), and helped boost the show's popularity with British as well as Australian audiences.

He won his first Logie Award for "Best New Talent" in 1987 and received a commendation in the category "Performance by a Male Actor In a Series" from the Television Society of Australia's Penguin Awards. In 1988 he was awarded the Silver Logie for the "Most Popular Actor" on Australian television.

In addition to his regular role in Neighbours, Donovan appeared as "Happy Houston" in the 1988 Australian World War II mini-series The Heroes, based on the historical novel by Ronald McKie. He won the 1990 Logie Award for "Most Popular Actor in a Mini-Series".

Donovan left Neighbours in 1989. Twenty years later, he said that he had been asked to return to tie in with the show's 25th anniversary in 2010, but was unable to do so due to other work commitments.

=== 1988–1991: Pop career ===
While he was still appearing in Neighbours, Donovan followed Minogue (who had already left the series by this point) by pursuing a pop career. His early exploration of music included recording a demo written by pub rock band Noiseworks, and he was offered the chance to record the song "Waiting for a Star to Fall", later a hit for Boy Meets Girl.

However he followed Minogue by signing a recording contract with Mushroom Records in Australia, and with PWL in the UK. Although the production team of Stock Aitken Waterman (SAW) initially resisted working with Donovan, fearing recording with a second Neighbours star would be "too tacky", the trio quickly warmed to him, recording his first single, "Nothing Can Divide Us", after it was rejected by Rick Astley. The track was released in 1988, reaching number five in the UK and number three in Australia.

Donovan's next single, a duet with Minogue, "Especially for You", was released in late November 1988. While the idea for a duet was at first rejected by SAW, who felt it too commercial, the producers changed their minds when retail chain Woolworths ordered 250,000 copies of the record. Donovan agreed to the duet with Minogue without reservation, feeling it would be good for his career. After spending four weeks at No. 2 in the UK, it hit No. 1 in January 1989. It was the fourth-highest selling single in the UK in 1988, and 17th in Australia for 1989. The track became SAW's biggest ever hit in the UK, ultimately selling in excess of one million copies. The issue of UK pop magazine Smash Hits that featured Minogue and Donovan on the cover to promote the release also sold one million copies. The song was accompanied by a widely noted image change for Donovan, who shed his trademark Neighbours mullet for a contemporary undercut.

Donovan's next single, "Too Many Broken Hearts", reached number one in the UK in March 1989. The singer said he initially had no idea the song would go on to be so successful, and thought it might just be an album track. He confessed to at first being underwhelmed by the video, and was surprised by the ecstatic response it earned at his label. However, he now regards the track as one of SAW's best songs, as well as being his defining hit.

He released his début album, Ten Good Reasons, in May 1989, which also reached number one (for three weeks). For two weeks, Donovan held the number one positions in the singles chart and the albums chart simultaneously, when his next single, a cover of Brian Hyland's "Sealed with a Kiss", entered the UK charts at number one.

In December 1989, he took part in Band Aid II's version of "Do They Know It's Christmas?", which also included Minogue, whose exit from Neighbours had by now been shown on screen in both Australia and the UK. His own exit from the show had by this stage been shown on Australian television, although it was not aired on British television until several months later.

Donovan released his second album, Between The Lines, in May 1990, again produced by Stock Aitken Waterman. He had greater creative input on the record, asking for more material that was within his range, after he struggled with some of the vocal requirements of certain songs on his debut album. He has stated that he believes the album's consistent lyrical themes of heartbreak and relationship breakdowns were references by songwriters SAW to his then recent split from Kylie Minogue.

Although the album reached Platinum status in the UK, it was less successful than his debut a year before, peaking at no. 2 and selling only a fifth as many copies. Assessing the performance of the album, Donovan concluded that while it was artistically a much stronger record than his debut album, he felt it was impossible to match the very high UK sales of Ten Good Reasons.

Five singles were released from the second album, and although they all reached the UK Top 30, they also signalled a decline in his popularity. Between 1988 and 1992, Donovan garnered 16 Top 40 hit singles in the UK.

Speaking of the album's commercial performance, Donovan said: "Between the Lines wasn't the successful record that Ten Good Reasons was, but how do you match that? Ten Good Reason's was just a moment in time." He also added that he accepted at the time that "every bubble has to burst", and he knew he'd have to prioritise evolving his career.

Donovan then embarked on an extensive world tour in 1990, The "Doin' Fine Tour", against the wishes of his label, which wanted him available for promotional duties. The tour covered the UK, Ireland, mainland Europe, Australia, Singapore and other parts of South East Asia. The Dublin concert was recorded and released on VHS in 1990; and released on DVD in 2010.

While the decision to tour upset Pete Waterman and Donovan's record label, the singer credits the live shows with ensuring his longevity as a stage performer, after Andrew Lloyd Webber attended one of the shows and was impressed with his performance.

Donovan continued to act alongside his pop career, and in 1990 he appeared in his first feature film, Blood Oath (released in some countries as Prisoners of the Sun).

=== 1991–1993: Stage career and The Face lawsuit ===
With his 1991 single "R.S.V.P." underperforming on the charts, and his wish to evolve his music towards a more adult, Happy Mondays-inspired sound rejected by Pete Waterman, Donovan was keen to find a new path forward. Donovan's management felt a return to acting was a way to transition, as his "shelf life as a pop star was coming to an end."

He accepted the lead role in the restaged London Palladium version of Joseph and the Amazing Technicolor Dreamcoat, directed by Steven Pimlott. Donovan had his third solo UK No. 1 single with one of its songs, "Any Dream Will Do". Donovan left the production in early 1992.

In 1992, Donovan launched a libel action against The Face magazine which had published allegations that he was homosexual. Donovan won £200,000 in damages and the magazine had to pay a further £100,000 in costs, but the lawsuit created a backlash with some people accusing him of being homophobic. Although he had been a mild drug user who had smoked cannabis joints up until this point, in the months after his libel action Donovan began using cocaine. In a 2007 Marie Claire interview, and also in his 2007 autobiography Between The Lines: My Story Uncut, Donovan stated that suing The Face was the biggest mistake of his life.

Donovan moved to Polydor Records and released his third album, All Around The World (1993). The recording sessions had been fraught, with the record company unhappy with its initial production style, and Donovan's new theatrical singing style, requiring significant re-recording. The album was unsuccessful, failing to reach the UK Top 20 and was not released at all in his native Australia. His contract with Polydor was not extended and it would be Donovan's last album for 15 years.

=== 1995–1999: Drug addiction, The Last Bullet and continued musical work ===
Donovan later admitted that by 1995 he had a serious drug problem, taking around three grams (1/10 oz) of cocaine a day. In early 1995, he attended model Kate Moss's 21st birthday party at The Viper Room in Los Angeles, where he suffered a drug overdose.

Later in 1995, Donovan starred in the Australian TV film The Last Bullet with Koji Tamaki, directed by Michael Pattison, which was set in World War II on the Pacific island of Borneo.

In 1998, Donovan took the lead role of Dr. Frank N. Furter in the UK touring production of The Rocky Horror Show, where he met stage manager Angela Malloch. The pair had a brief relationship, before reuniting, when Malloch became pregnant and gave Donovan an ultimatum that he had to stop using drugs, if he wanted to be part of their child's life.

In late 1999, Donovan said that he still used cocaine, stating: "I still have a joint and I still take coke, but not as much as I did two years ago." In 2011, he stated that he has been drug-free since 2000, the year his first child was born.

=== 2000–2006: Fatherhood, MDA and participation in I'm a Celebrity... ===
Donovan's daughter Jemma Donovan was born in March 2000. Since then, with his drug problems now under control, he continued to act on stage and television, and had a role in the medical-legal television drama MDA (2003–05), on Australia's ABC network. Since 2003, Donovan has also lent his voice to the Buzz! series of quiz video games.

In late 2004, he was headlining in the stage musical Chitty Chitty Bang Bang at the London Palladium. He finished his original run on 13 March 2005, but was then invited back from June onwards to play in the final two months of the show, until its closure on 4 September 2005. Following this, he has toured the UK performing a few gigs and returned to the stage in January 2006 to star in a UK tour of Stephen Sondheim's Sweeney Todd. After this, he returned to Melbourne to star in David Eldrige's Australian transfer of the London drama Festen.

Donovan took part in I'm a Celebrity... Get Me Out of Here! in 2006 and finished in 3rd place. He took part in many Bushtucker Trials, which included wearing a helmet full of insects and playing a giant game of Operation. Donovan lost out on the King of the Jungle Crown to Matt Willis. Despite his loss, during an interview on The Steve Wright Show on BBC Radio 2 (January 2008), he said that his appearance on I'm a Celebrity... had revitalised his career.

=== 2007–2009: Return to music career and soap operas ===
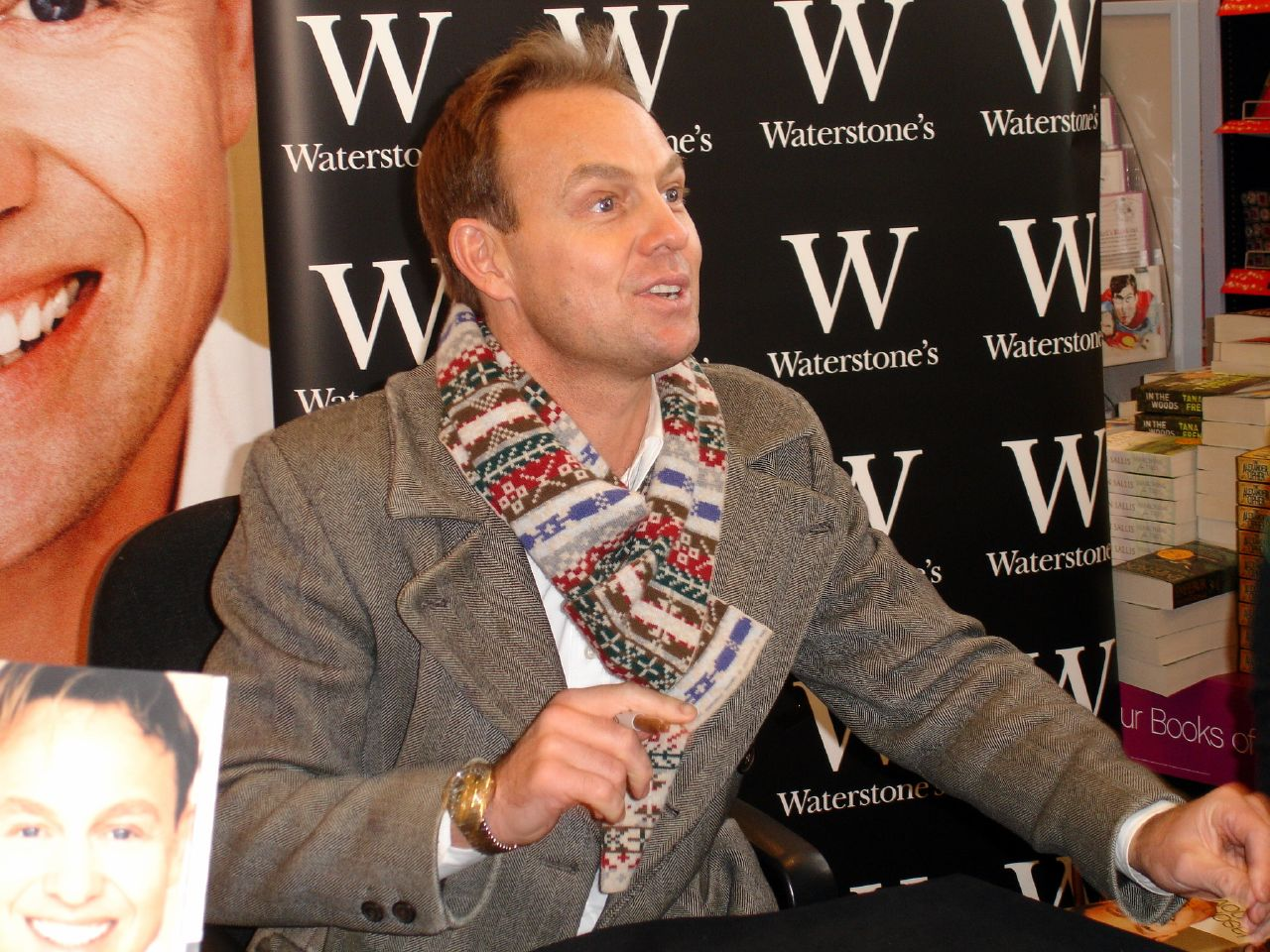
Donovan at a 2007 book signing in Waterstones Bournemouth.

Donovan performed a medley of songs from Joseph along with other actors who have played the eponymous role (Donny Osmond and Lee Mead) at the Concert for Diana in July 2007.

In early 2008, Donovan had a role in ITV's post-watershed soap opera Echo Beach; the series was cancelled after 12 episodes. He also presented Sunday Night with Jason Donovan, a programme on The One Network of British local radio stations.

On 25 September 2008, Donovan performed in the canteen at the head offices of Tesco in Welwyn Garden City, Hertfordshire. He was promoting his forthcoming album, Let It Be Me, which was released on 10 November 2008. The album, his first for 15 years, reached No. 28 in the UK.

In 2009, Donovan performed as Tick (Mitzi) in the London stage musical production of Priscilla Queen of the Desert at the Palace Theatre. Also in 2009, Donovan began appearing in television commercials (with Kerry Katona and Coleen Nolan) for the frozen food supermarket chain Iceland in the UK.

=== 2010–2013: Soundtrack of the 80s, Strictly Come Dancing and Sign of Your Love ===
In September 2010, Donovan took part in the BBC television series Who Do You Think You Are?, tracing his family tree back several generations. Donovan's fifth studio album, Soundtrack of the 80s, was released in October 2010. The album is composed of cover versions of well known 1980s hits such as "Drive" (The Cars), "(I Just) Died in Your Arms" (Cutting Crew) and "Sign Your Name" (Terence Trent D'Arby) and several others. The same year, Donovan played the role of The Artilleryman in the 2010–2011 stage show Jeff Wayne's Musical Version of The War of the Worlds. The show toured the UK and Europe, starting in November 2010 and finished in Germany in January 2011. Donovan also voiced the part of Toby the Kangaroo in the environmental animated film Animals United.

In February 2011, Donovan appeared on the BBC series Ready, Steady, Cook. Later in 2011, he performed on the Here and Now Tour, and also toured in a production of The Sound of Music playing Captain Von Trapp. The production co-starred Verity Rushworth as Maria. From September 2011, Donovan took part in the ninth series of the BBC's Strictly Come Dancing. He was partnered with dancer Kristina Rihanoff and finished third in the competition. Donovan presented a voice-tracked radio show on Heart each Sunday from 10 am to 12 noon. Donovan temporarily left the station in 2013

In March 2012, Donovan released a new album of covers, Sign Of Your Love, which peaked at number 36 in the UK Albums Chart. In May 2012, Donovan was interviewed by Piers Morgan on the ITV series Piers Morgan's Life Stories, in which he talked openly about his career, his past, his former relationship with Kylie Minogue, and his battle with drugs. During the interview, Donovan also said that he had undergone hair transplantation to counteract his thinning hair. In summer 2012, he appeared as a judge on ITV's talent search show Superstar. In late 2012, Donovan again toured the UK and Europe in a new version of Jeff Wayne's War of the Worlds, this time playing Parson Nathaniel.

In 2013, Donovan reprised his role as Tick/Mitzi in the UK national touring production of Priscilla, Queen of the Desert. On 5 May 2013, Donovan was heard narrating Pick TV's budget version of Rude Tube, entitled Video Surf. Donovan said in January 2015 that he was invited to return to Neighbours for the show's 30th anniversary celebrations, but he declined the offer, adding "it's just not something I want to do". However, he agreed to take part in the documentary special Neighbours 30th: The Stars Reunite, which aired in Australia and the UK in March 2015.

=== 2015–2019: Radio, Tours and Joseph return ===
Since 2015, Donovan has presented Jason Donovan's 80s Rewind (known as All 80s from 2015 to 2017) on Heart Radio, which airs on Sunday evenings from 7 pm until 10 pm.

In 2016, Donovan toured the UK with his Ten Good Reasons and Greatest Hits Tour.

In 2017, Heart 80s Radio was launched and he began presenting Sunday Mornings from 9 am to 12 noon in addition to his 80s Rewind Sunday Evening Show on Heart. In December 2017 it was announced that in the new year Donovan would be taking his second break from his radio shows. In 2018, Donovan revived his role in, War of the Worlds.

In summer 2019, Donovan returned to the London Palladium in a new production of Joseph and the Amazing Technicolor Dreamcoat, this time playing the Pharaoh alongside Sheridan Smith as the Narrator and Jac Yarrow as Joseph.

=== 2020–present: Dancing on Ice and Neighbours finale ===
For Christmas 2020, Donovan was due to make his pantomime debut as The Evil Ringmaster in Goldilocks and the Three Bears at the Birmingham Hippodrome, however due to the COVID-19 pandemic the panto was postponed to Christmas 2021.

In 2021, Donavan competed in the thirteenth series of Dancing on Ice, paired with Alexandra Schauman. However, he withdrew from the competition in week 6 due to a back injury.

In July 2022, Donovan returned as Scott to Neighbours for a one-off cameo appearance (alongside Kylie Minogue as Charlene) for what was believed (at the time) to be the show's final ever episode. Subsequently, Amazon announced that they had picked up the series for their Freevee streaming service, and Amazon started filming the revived series in April 2023.

From May 2024, Donovan played the role of Frank-N-Furter in the touring Australian/UK stage performances of The Rocky Horror Show.

In 2026, Donovan continued his UK, Doing Fine, Encore Show tour and is set to star in the Melbourne stage production of, One Flew Over the Cuckoo's Nest, as the title role character, Randle P. McMurphy for a limited season of twenty-nine dates from 13 November.

== Personal life ==
Donovan is married to Angela Malloch, with whom he has three children. They live in West London and Oxfordshire. Donovan's half-sister is former Neighbours actress Stephanie McIntosh. Although he is estranged from his mother, he is close with his maternal grandmother and other relatives.

Donovan was the subject of an episode of the BBC TV series Who Do You Think You Are? on 30 August 2010 in which he discovered he is a descendant of the pioneer William Cox, who built the first road across Australia's Blue Mountains in 1814. Donovan is of partial Jewish descent through one of his maternal great-grandmothers, Eileen Dawson (née Lyons).

Donovan was in a relationship with Kylie Minogue from 1986 to 1989. They have remained friends after the breakup.

== Discography ==
- Ten Good Reasons (1989)
- Between the Lines (1990)
- All Around the World (1993)
- Let It Be Me (2008)
- Soundtrack of the 80s (2010)
- Sign of Your Love (2012)

== Filmography ==
=== Film and television ===
Year	Title	Format	Role
1980	Skyways	TV series	Robin's Brother & Trevor Kirk
1981	I Can Jump Puddles	TV movie	Freddy
1983	Home	TV series	Unknown
1985	Golden Pennies	TV series	Sean
1986–1989, 2022	Neighbours	TV series	Scott Robinson
1989	The Heroes	TV mini-series	Happy Huston
1990	Prisoners of the Sun	Film	Private Talbot
1990	Shadows of the Heart	TV movie	Alex Fargo
1991	Joseph and the Amazing Technicolour Dreamcoat	TV special	Joseph
1993	Galleria	Short film	Duane
1995	The Last Bullet	TV movie	Stanley Brennan
1995	Rough Diamonds	Film	Mike Tyrell
1996	The Sun, the Moon and the Stars	Film	Pat
2000	Sorted	Film	Martin
2002	Tempe Tip	Film	Max
2002–2003	MDA	TV series	Richard Savage
2003	Horseplay	Film	Henry
2003	Ned	Film	Father Thompson
2004	Loot	TV movie	Jon Peregrine
2005	Vietcong 2	Video game	Australian Officer
2005–2010	Buzz!	Video game series	Buzz
2008	Iracing.com	Video Game	Default Spotter
2008	Echo Beach	TV series	Daniel Marrack
2010	Animals United	Film	Toby (voice)
2011	Evil Calls (The Legend of Harrow Woods)	Video film	Gary
2011	Back2Hell	Video film	Gary
2012	PlayStation All-Stars Battle Royale	Video game	Buzz
2014	Boj	TV series for CBeebies	Pops (voice)
2014	Watch Dogs - The Suspect Man	Mission: Big Brother	
2019	Dial M for Middlesbrough	TV series	Darren
2021	Not Going Out	TV series	Prince Charming
2025	Emmerdale	TV series	Himself

=== Theatre ===
Year	Title	Format	Role
1991–1992	Joseph and the Amazing Technicolour Dreamcoat	London Palladium	Joseph
1998	The Rocky Horror Show	UK tour	Frank-N-Furter
2005	Chitty Chitty Bang Bang	London Palladium	Caractacus Potts
2006	Sweeney Todd: The Demon Barber of Fleet Street	UK tour	Sweeney Todd
2009	Priscilla, Queen of the Desert	Palace Theatre, London	Mitzi (aka "Tick")
2010	Jeff Wayne's Musical Version of The War of the Worlds	UK arena tour	The Artilleryman
2011	The Sound of Music	UK tour	Captain von Trapp
2012	Jeff Wayne's Musical Version of The War of the Worlds	UK arena tour	Parson Nathaniel
2013	Priscilla, Queen of the Desert	UK tour	Mitzi (aka "Tick")
2014	Annie Get Your Gun	UK tour	Frank Butler
2014	Jeff Wayne's Musical Version of The War of the Worlds	UK arena tour	Parson Nathaniel
2015	The King's Speech	Chichester Festival Theatre, Birmingham Repertory Theatre and UK tour	Lionel Logue
2015	Priscilla, Queen of the Desert	UK tour	Mitzi (aka "Tick")
2016	Million Dollar Quartet	UK tour	Sam Phillips
2019	Joseph and the Amazing Technicolour Dreamcoat	London Palladium	Pharaoh
2019	Chicago	Arts Centre Melbourne	Billy Flynn
2021	Joseph and the Amazing Technicolour Dreamcoat	London Palladium	Pharaoh
2021	Goldilocks and the Three Bears	Birmingham Hippodrome	The Evil Ringmaster
2022	Joseph and the Amazing Technicolour Dreamcoat	UK tour	Pharaoh
2022	Grease	Dominion Theatre, London	Teen Angel
2022	Goldilocks and the Three Bears	Mayflower Theatre, Southampton	The Evil Ringmaster
2023	The Rocky Horror Show (50th Anniversary Production)	Theatre Royal, Sydney	Frank-N-Furter
2023	Grease	Dominion Theatre, London	Teen Angel
2024–2025	The Rocky Horror Show (50th Anniversary Production)	UK Tour	Frank-N-Furter

== Awards and nominations ==
Brit Awards

Year	Nominee / work	Award	Result
1990	"Sealed with a Kiss"	British Video of the Year	Nominated
1990	"Too Many Broken Hearts"	British Video of the Year	Nominated

Logie Awards

Year	Nominee / work	Award	Result
1987	"Neighbours"	Most Popular Australian Actor	Nominated
1987	"Neighbours"	Most Popular New Talent in Australia	Won
1988	"Neighbours"	Most Popular Australian Actor	Won
1989	"Neighbours"	Gold Logie Award for Most Popular Personality on Australian Television	Nominated
1989	"Neighbours"	Most Popular Australian Actor	Nominated
1989	"Especially for You"	Most Popular Music Video	Nominated
1990	"The Heroes"	Most Popular Actor In A Telemovie or Mini-Series	Won

Mo Awards

Year	Nominee / work	Award	Result
1991	Jason Donovan	Australian Showbusiness Ambassador	Won
