= The Twelve Inches of Bananarama =

Compilation album by Bananarama
- Released: 2 October 2006
- Recorded: 1982–1991
- Genre: Pop, dance, new wave
- Label: Warners Platinum
- Producer: Various

Bananarama chronology
Drama (2005)	The Twelve Inches of Bananarama (2006)	Greatest Hits and More More More (2007)

The Twelve Inches of Bananarama is a compilation album by the English girl group Bananarama, released on 2 October 2006 by Warner Bros. Records. The collection contains twelve remixes of Bananarama songs, spanning the years 1982 to 1991, many of which are appearing on compact disc for the first time. The photo on the album cover features group members Sara Dallin, Jacquie O'Sullivan and Keren Woodward from the Pop Life album era, c. 1991. It was rated three stars by AllMusic.

== Track listing ==
1. "Really Saying Something" (Extended Mix) — 4:02
  Remixed by Fun Boy Three
2. "Shy Boy" (12" Mix) — 5:53
3. "Cruel Summer" (The Digital Mix) — 6:03
  Remixed by Jim Thias
4. "Venus" (Extended Club Mix) — 7:23
  Remixed by Stock, Aitken & Waterman
5. "More Than Physical" (Garage Mix) — 8:48
  Remixed by Stock, Aitken & Waterman
6. "A Trick of the Night" (The Number One Mix) — 8:18
  Remixed by Stock, Aitken & Waterman
7. "I Heard a Rumour" (Horoscope Mix) — 5:54
  Remixed by Stock, Aitken & Waterman
8. "Love, Truth and Honesty" (Hot Power 12") — 9:17
  Remixed by Phil Harding & Ian Curnow
9. "Nathan Jones" (12" Mix) — 5:12
10. "Only Your Love" (Youth & Thrash On the Mix) — 6:33
  Remixed by Martin Glover & Kris Weston
11. "Preacher Man" (Shep's Club Mix) — 7:19
  Additional Production & Remix by Shep Pettibone
12. "Tripping on Your Love" (George Michael's Metropolis Mix) — 3:37
  Remixed by George Michael
