= The Greatest Hits Collection (video) =

Video by Bananarama
- Released: 1988
- Genre: Pop; rock; dance
- Length: 45:00
- Label: London
- Director: Keef; Midge Ure; Chris Cross; Duncan Gibbins; Peter Care; Andy Morahan; Big TV!

Bananarama chronology
The Video Singles (1987)	The Greatest Hits Collection (1988)	Drama (2005)

The Greatest Hits Collection is a Bananarama videos compilation released by London Records in 1988, as a companion video to their Greatest Hits album. The video differs slightly from the album—"More Than Physical" and "Mr. Sleaze", the latter the B-side to "Love in the First Degree", are not included on the album. The video to "Love in the First Degree" includes group live performance from 1988 BRIT awards (last performance ever with Fahey), while the videos for "I Want You Back" and "Love, Truth & Honesty" feature new member Jacquie O'Sullivan. The video for "Nathan Jones" was not included.

It was rated 4.5 stars by AllMusic.

== Track listing ==
Multimix includes

1. "Cruel Summer"
2. "Na Na Hey Hey (Kiss Him Goodbye)"
  Directed by Keef
3. "Shy Boy"
  Directed by Midge Ure & Chris Cross
4. "Robert De Niro's Waiting..."
  Directed by Duncan Gibbins
5. "Really Saying Something"
  Directed by Midge Ure & Chris Cross
1. "Venus" (12" Mix)
  Directed by Peter Care
2. "More Than Physical" (UK Single Version)
  Directed by Peter Care
3. "I Heard a Rumour"
  Directed by Andy Morahan
4. "Love In The First Degree"
  Live performance from 1988 BRIT awards
  Directed by Andy Morahan
5. "Mr. Sleaze" (Rare Groove Remix)
  Edited by Marek Budzynski
6. "I Can't Help It" (Club Mix Edit)
  Directed by Andy Morahan
7. "I Want You Back"
  Directed by Andy Morahan
8. "Love, Truth & Honesty"
  Directed by Big TV!
