= The Greatest Hits Collection (Bananarama album) =

Greatest hits album by Bananarama
- Released: 10 October 1988 (first edition)
- Recorded: 1981–1988 (first edition), 1989, 1991, 1992–1993
- Genres: Pop, dance-pop, new wave
- Label: London
- Producers: Fun Boy Three, Tony Swain, Steve Jolley, Stock Aitken Waterman, Bananarama

Bananarama chronology
Wow! (1987)	The Greatest Hits Collection (1988)	Pop Life (1991)

Singles from The Greatest Hits Collection
- 1. "Love, Truth and Honesty" Released: 12 September 1988; 2. "Nathan Jones" Released: 7 November 1988; 3. "Help!" Released: 13 February 1989

The Greatest Hits Collection is a compilation album released by Bananarama which features their single releases and greatest hits. It was issued by London Records in 1988, eight months after the departure of group member Siobhan Fahey. The track listing differed between versions released in the United States and Canada, as well as those released throughout Europe and other territories.

== Composition ==
Except where otherwise noted, all songs are represented on the album in their single or 7" mix variants. The version of "I Want You Back" (originally on their Wow! album) on this collection is the newer version of the song with vocals re-recorded by Sara Dallin and Keren Woodward with new member Jacquie O'Sullivan, following the departure of Fahey. One new song, "Love, Truth and Honesty", was released as a single (which featured O'Sullivan's first credits as a song-writing contributor), and peaked inside the UK top 30. The other new track on the compilation was a re-recorded version of the Supremes track "Nathan Jones". Like "I Want You Back", this song was originally included on the Wow! album released before Fahey's departure. The new line-up re-recorded the song with new vocal and instrumental arrangements. This new version, now known as the 'Dave Ford Mix', was initially included on vinyl and cassette issues of this compilation, and on the original Canadian CD pressing. It was subsequently remixed by in-house PWL Mixmaster Pete Hammond and released as a single, reaching the UK Top 20 and this version replaced both the earlier 'Psycho 7" Edit' and 'Dave Ford Mix' versions on the compilation. Later re-issues have added on various remixes, as well as a cover of the Beatles hit, "Help!".

== Critical reception ==
Professional ratings
Review scores
Source	Rating
AllMusic	4.5/5 stars
Christgau's Record Guide	B+
NME	9/10
Number One	4/5 stars
Q	4/5 stars
Record Mirror	2/5
The Rolling Stone Album Guide	4/5 stars
Smash Hits	9 1/2/10
Smash Hits Australia	5/5 stars
Spin Alternative Record Guide	9/10

A review published in Music Week stated the compilation is composed of "a surprising amount of hits" and deemed it "enjoyable, disposable, fair play to them and hard to deny".

== Track listing ==
=== Original Release ===
LP and Cassette

Side A

1. "Venus"
2. "I Heard a Rumour"
3. ”Love in the First Degree"
4. "I Can’t Help It"
5. "I Want You Back"
6. "Love, Truth and Honesty"
7. "Nathan Jones"

Side B

1. "Really Saying Something" – with Fun Boy Three
2. "Shy Boy"
3. "Robert De Niro’s Waiting"
4. ”Cruel Summer"
5. "It Ain’t What You Do It’s The Way That You Do It" – with Fun Boy Three
6. "Na Na Hey Hey (Kiss Him Goodbye)”
7. "Rough Justice"

CD

As noted above, many variants of the album exist on CD depending on region and edition. On all editions of The Greatest Hits Collection, the included version of "Trick of the Night" is now known as the 'Tricky Mix 7" Edit'. While the 1999 international re-release included the 7" version of Preacher Man from the Pop Life album, most variants of the CD release contain some version of the following track listing:

1. "Venus"
2. "I Heard a Rumour"
3. ”Love in the First Degree"
4. "I Can’t Help It"
5. ”I Want You Back"
6. "Love, Truth and Honesty"
7. ”Nathan Jones"
8. "Help!” – with Lananeeneenoonoo
9. "Really Saying Something" – with Fun Boy Three
10. "Shy Boy"
11. ”Robert De Niro’s Waiting"
12. ”Cruel Summer"
13. ”It Ain’t What You Do It’s The Way That You Do It" – with Fun Boy Three
14. ”Na Na Hey Hey (Kiss Him Goodbye)”
15. "Rough Justice"
16. ”Trick of the Night"
17. "Aie a Mwana"
18. "Venus (12" Hellfire Mix)”
19. "Love in the First Degree (Eurobeat Style)”

=== The Greatest Hits & More More More ===
In 2008, a reworked version of The Greatest Hits Collection was released. Titled The Greatest Hits & More More More, this release featured an expanded track list incorporating many of the singles not present on the original compilation, most notably those from Pop Life and Please Yourself. This release contains the album version of "More, More, More" and the 'PWL 7" Mix' of "A Trick of the Night".

1. "Venus"
2. "Love in the First Degree"
3. "I Want You Back"
4. "Robert De Niro's Waiting"
5. "Cruel Summer"
6. "Really Saying Something" (with Fun Boy Three)
7. "It Ain't What You Do (It's The Way That You Do It)" (with Fun Boy Three)
8. "Shy Boy"
9. "Na Na Hey Hey (Kiss Him Goodbye)"
10. "Love, Truth & Honesty"
11. "Nathan Jones"
12. "I Heard a Rumour"
13. "Movin' On"
14. "More More More"
15. "I Can't Help It"
16. "Only Your Love"
17. "Preacher Man"
18. "Long Train Running"
19. "Aie a Mwana"
20. "A Trick of the Night"
21. "Rough Justice"
22. "Cheers Then"

=== 2017 Collector’s Edition ===
In order to coincide with Siobhan Fahey's return to the group for The Original Line Up Tour in 2017, London Records released an expanded version of the original 1988 edition as a double album. The tracklist was updated to include all of their UK singles released between 1981 and 1988 on disc one and a selection of remixes from the same period on disc two. The cover art from the original release was reused, however, the booklet was updated to include some additional pictures of the group in 2017 along with new liner notes for the additional tracks.

Disc 1
No.	Title	Writer(s)	Producer(s)	Length
1.	"Venus"	Robbie van Leeuwen	Stock Aitken Waterman	3:40
2.	"I Heard a Rumour"	Sara Dallin; Siobhan Fahey; Keren Woodward; Stock; Aitken; Waterman	Stock Aitken Waterman	3:25
3.	"Love in the First Degree"	Dallin; Fahey; Woodward; Stock; Aitken; Waterman	Stock Aitken Waterman	3:33
4.	"I Can't Help It"	Dallin; Fahey; Woodward; Stock; Aitken; Waterman	Stock Aitken Waterman	3:32
5.	"I Want You Back"	Dallin; Fahey; Woodward; Stock; Aitken; Waterman	Stock Aitken Waterman	3:47
6.	"Love, Truth and Honesty"	Dallin; Jacquie O'Sullivan; Woodward; Stock; Aitken; Waterman	Stock Aitken Waterman	3:25
7.	"Nathan Jones"	Kathleen Wakefield; Leonard Caston Jr.	Stock Aitken Waterman	3:20
8.	"Really Saying Something" (with Fun Boy Three)	Norman Whitfield; William "Mickey" Stevenson; Edward Holland, Jr.	Dave Jordan; Fun Boy Three	2:45
9.	"Shy Boy"	Steve Jolley; Tony Swain	Jolley & Swain	3:16
10.	"Robert De Niro's Waiting"	Jolley; Swain; Dallin; Fahey; Woodward	Jolley & Swain	3:43
11.	"Cruel Summer"	Jolley; Swain; Dallin; Fahey; Woodward	Jolley & Swain	3:35
12.	"It Ain't What You Do" (with Fun Boy Three)	Sy Oliver; Trummy Young	Jordan; Fun Boy Three	2:54
13.	"Na Na Hey Hey (Kiss Him Goodbye)"	Paul Leka; Gary DeCarlo; Dale Frashuer	Jolley & Swain	3:30
14.	"Rough Justice"	Jolley; Swain; Dallin; Fahey; Woodward	Jolley & Swain	3:38
15.	"Trick of the Night"	Jolley; Swain	Jolley & Swain	4:08
16.	"Aie a Mwana"	Daniel Vangarde; Jean Kluger	Paul Cook; John Martin; Dallin	3:38
17.	"More Than Physical"	Dallin; Fahey; Woodward; Stock; Aitken; Waterman	Stock Aitken Waterman	3:43
18.	"Do Not Disturb"	Jolley; Swain	Jolley & Swain	3:25
19.	"Hot Line to Heaven"	Dallin; Fahey; Woodward; Jolley; Swain	Jolley & Swain	3:54
20.	"The Wild Life"	Dallin; Fahey; Woodward; Jolley; Swain	Jolley & Swain	3:17
21.	"Cheers Then"	Dallin; Fahey; John Martin; Terry Sharp; Woodward	Barry Blue	3:30

Disc 2
No.	Title	Producers	Length
1.	"Really Saying Something" (U.S. Extended Version, with Fun Boy Three)	Jordan; Fun Boy Three; John Luongo (remix)	7:57
2.	"Shy Boy" (U.S. Extended Version)	Jolley & Swain; Luongo (remix)	7:20
3.	"Na Na Hey Hey (Kiss Him Goodbye)" (Extended Version)	Jolley & Swain	4:51
4.	"Robert De Niro's Waiting" (Extended Version)	Jolley & Swain	5:42
5.	"Venus" (12" Hellfire Mix)	Stock Aitken Waterman; Ian Levine (remix)	9:18
6.	"More Than Physical" (Garage Mix)	Stock Aitken Waterman	8:46
7.	"I Heard a Rumour" (Miami Mix)	Stock Aitken Waterman; Phil Harding (remix)	7:13
8.	"Love in the First Degree" (Eurobeat Style)	Stock Aitken Waterman; Euro-Twins (remix)	7:18
9.	"I Can't Help It" (The Hammond Version Excursion)	Stock Aitken Waterman; Pete Hammond (remix)	6:33
10.	"Nathan Jones" (Psycho Mix)	Stock Aitken Waterman; Hammond (remix)	6:23
11.	"Cruel Summer '89" (Swing Beat Dub)	Jolley & Swain; Swain (remix)	5:17

== Personnel ==
Bananarama

- Sara Dallin – vocals
- Siobhan Fahey – vocals
- Jacquie O'Sullivan – vocals on "I Want You Back", "Love, Truth and Honesty", "Nathan Jones", "Help!" and "Preacher Man"
- Keren Woodward – vocals

Musicians

- Fun Boy Three – vocals on "Really Saying Something" and "It Ain't What You Do It's the Way That You Do It"
- Lananeeneenoonoo – additional vocals on "Help!"

Additional Personnel

- Andrew Biscomb – sleeve design
- Peter Barrett – sleeve design
- Herb Ritts – cover sleeve photography
- Andrew McPherson – inner sleeve photography

== Charts ==
=== Weekly charts ===
Weekly chart performance for The Greatest Hits Collection
Chart (1988–1989)	Peak position
Australian Albums (ARIA)	21
Canada Top Albums/CDs (RPM)	68
Dutch Albums (Album Top 100)	43
European Albums (Music & Media)	16
Finnish Albums (Suomen virallinen lista)	1
French Compilations (SNEP)	2
German Albums (Offizielle Top 100)	43
Icelandic Albums (Tónlist)	7
Italian Albums (Musica e dischi)	6
Japanese Albums (Oricon)	7
New Zealand Albums (RMNZ)	7
Spanish Albums (AFYVE)	2
Swedish Albums (Sverigetopplistan)	43
UK Albums (Official Charts)	3
US Billboard 200	151

=== Year-end chart ===
1988 weekly chart performance for The Greatest Hits Collection
Chart (1988)	Position
UK Albums (Gallup)	19

1989 weekly chart performance for The Greatest Hits Collection
Chart (1989)	Position
Australian Albums (ARIA)	63
European Albums (Music & Media)	88
New Zealand Albums (RMNZ)	45
UK Albums (Gallup)	78

== Certifications and sales ==
Certifications and sales for The Greatest Hits Collection
Region	Certification	Certified units/sales
Australia (ARIA)	Platinum	70,000^{^}
Canada (Music Canada)	Gold	50,000^{^}
Finland (Musiikkituottajat)	Platinum	57,087
France (SNEP)	2× Gold	200,000^{*}
Hong Kong (IFPI Hong Kong)	Platinum	20,000^{*}
Italy sales 1988–1989	—	100,000
Spain (Promusicae)	Platinum	100,000^{^}
Switzerland (IFPI Switzerland)	Gold	25,000^{^}
United Kingdom (BPI)	3× Platinum	900,000^{^}
United States (RIAA) video	Gold	50,000^{^}
^{*} Sales figures based on certification alone.^{^} Shipments figures based on certification alone.
