= Please Yourself =

Studio album by Bananarama
- Released: 29 March 1993
- Recorded: 1992
- Studios: PWL Studios, Borough High Street, London; BMG Recording Studios, New York City
- Genres: Pop; dance-pop; disco
- Length: 39:33
- Label: London
- Producer: Stock & Waterman

Bananarama chronology
Pop Life (1991)	Please Yourself (1993)	Bunch of Hits (1993)

Singles from Please Yourself
- 1. "Movin' On" Released: 17 August 1992; 2. "Last Thing on My Mind" Released: 16 November 1992; 3. "More, More, More" Released: 8 March 1993

Professional ratings
Review scores
Source	Rating
AllMusic	2/5 stars
Calgary Herald	C

Please Yourself is the sixth studio album by the English pop act Bananarama. It was released on 29 March 1993 by London Records, the group's last release under the label. It is also the first album from Bananarama as a duo – with original members Sara Dallin and Keren Woodward continuing after the departure of Jacquie O'Sullivan in 1991. Please Yourself also reunites Bananarama with two-thirds of the Stock Aitken Waterman production team (Stock and Waterman). Musician Gary Miller was brought in to do keyboards and guitar and would be Bananarama's next collaborator on their following album Ultra Violet. The concept of the album was first suggested by Pete Waterman as 'ABBA-Banana', a record that would feature pop songs in the style of ABBA, but updated for the 1990s. Ultimately, however, much of the album ended up incorporating a ‘90s Euro-disco sound with only “Movin’ On” and “Last Thing On My Mind” utilising an ABBA-esque influence.

Please Yourself was the first Bananarama album not to be released in the United States. Upon its release in the UK, it was panned by critics and charted at a low number forty-six. A limited double CD edition featured 12" remixes of some of the band’s past singles. Dallin and Woodward have later admitted in interviews that they are not fond of this album. Two of the songs on the album would later be reworked by Pete Waterman for use with the band Steps. "Last Thing on My Mind" would be their second single and the track "Movin' On" would be included on their second album Steptacular.

== Critical reception ==
In July 2018, Mark Elliot of Classic Pop ranked Please Yourself as the 14th best album ever produced by Stock Aitken Waterman. He presented the album as "a concept project [Waterman] billed "ABBA-Banana", and considered "Movin'On" and "Last Thing on My Mind" as "classics".

== Track listing ==
All songs written by Sara Dallin, Keren Woodward, Mike Stock, and Pete Waterman, except where noted.

CD and cassette

No.	Title	Writer(s)	Length
1.	"Movin' On"		4:38
2.	"Last Thing on My Mind"		3:35
3.	"Let Me Love You One More Time"		3:39
4.	"More, More, More"	Gregg Diamond, Sara Dallin, Keren Woodward, Mike Stock, Pete Waterman	3:08
5.	"Is She Good to You"		3:44
6.	"Only Time Will Tell"		3:35
7.	"Give It All Up for Love"		3:57
8.	"You'll Never Know What It Means"		4:36
9.	"You're Never Satisfied"		3:32
10.	"I Could Be Persuaded"		5:09
Total length:			39:33

Limited edition CD bonus tracks (disc 2)

1. "Venus" (Hellfire Mix) – 9:18 (R. V. Leeuwen)
2. "I Want You Back" (European Mix) – 7:54 (S. Dallin, S. Fahey, K. Woodward, M. Stock, M. Aitken, P. Waterman)
3. "Love in the First Degree" (Jailers Mix) – 6:03 (S. Dallin, S. Fahey, K. Woodward, M. Stock, M. Aitken, P. Waterman)
4. "Cruel Summer '89" (Swing Beat Dub) – 5:16 (S. Jolley, T. Swain, S. Dallin, S. Fahey, K. Woodward)
5. "Really Saying Something" (Long Version) – 5:40 (N. Whitfield, W. Stevenson, E. Holland, Jr)
6. "Na Na Hey Hey Kiss Him Goodbye" (Full Length Version) – 4:53 (G. DeCarlo, D. Frashuer, P. Leka)

Japanese CD

1. "Movin' On" – 4:38
2. "Last Thing on My Mind" – 3:35
3. "Let Me Love You One More Time" – 3:39
4. "More, More, More" – 3:08
5. "Is She Good to You" – 3:44
6. "Only Time Will Tell" – 3:35
7. "Give It All Up for Love" – 3:57
8. "You'll Never Know What It Means" – 4:36
9. "You're Never Satisfied" – 3:32
10. "I Could Be Persuaded" – 5:09
11. "Movin' On" (Bumpin' Mix) – 6:16
12. "Last Thing on My Mind" (Hi-NRG Mix) – 5:59
13. "Venus" (extended version) – 7:23

2007 CD re-issue plus bonus tracks

1. "Movin' On" - 4:37
2. "Last Thing on My Mind" - 3:34
3. "Let Me Love You One More Time" - 3:38
4. "More, More, More" - 3:07
5. "Is She Good to You" - 3:42
6. "Only Time Will Tell" - 3:34
7. "Give It All Up for Love" - 3:57
8. "You'll Never Know What It Means" - 4:33
9. "You're Never Satisfied" - 3:28
10. "I Could Be Persuaded" - 5:08
11. "Movin' On" (7-inch mix) - 3:32
12. "Another Lover" - 3:32
13. "Last Thing on My Mind" (7-inch mix) - 3:35
14. "Treat Me Right" - 4:42
15. "More, More, More" (Dave Ford single mix) - 3:21

2013 deluxe edition 2CD/DVD re-issue

Disc 1

1. "Movin' On" - 4:32
2. "Last Thing on My Mind" - 3:35
3. "Let Me Love You One More Time" - 3:36
4. "More, More, More" - 3:05
5. "Is She Good to You?" - 3:38
6. "Only Time Will Tell" - 3:31
7. "Give It All Up for Love" - 3:54
8. "You'll Never Know What It Means" - 4:28
9. "You're Never Satisfied" - 3:25
10. "I Could Be Persuaded" - 5:04
11. "Another Lover" - 3:30
12. "Treat Me Right" - 4:40
13. "More, More, More" (7" mix) - 3:23
14. "Movin' On" (Bumpin' Mix) - 6:13
15. "Last Thing on My Mind" (Hi-NRG Mix) - 5:58
16. "More, More, More" (12" mix) - 5:16
17. "Nueva Dirección" ("Movin' On" - Spanish version) - 3:36
18. "Last Thing on My Mind" (extended version) - 5:40

Disc 2

1. "Movin' On" (Movin' Mix) - 8:50
2. "Is She Good to You?" (7" Remix) - 3:18
3. "More, More, More" (original 12" mix) - 7.09
4. "Only Time Will Tell" (garage version) - 4:39*
5. "Movin' On" (original 12" mix) - 7:33
6. "Is She Good to You?" (12" club mix) - 5:50
7. "More, More, More" (extended version) - 5:04
8. "Movin' On" (NRG Mix) - 5:20
9. "Last Thing on My Mind" (Xtra NRG Mix) - 5:29
10. "More, More, More" (More Tech No Dub) - 5:48
11. "Movin' On" (The 'Norty' Banana Mix) - 6:18
12. "Last Thing on My Mind" (FXTC Dub) - 8:18
13. "More, More, More" (remix dub) - 5:06

DVD

1. "Movin' On"
2. "Last Thing on My Mind"
3. "More, More, More"
4. "Movin' On" (on Top of the Pops)
5. "Last Thing on My Mind" (on Pebble Mill)

== Personnel ==
Bananarama

- Sara Dallin – vocals
- Keren Woodward – vocals
- Mae McKenna, Miriam Stockley, Lance Ellington, Mark Williamson, Leroy Osbourne, Cleveland Watkiss, Mike Stock – backing vocals

Musicians

- Mike Stock, Julian Gingell, Gary Miller - keyboards
- Gary Miller - guitar
- A. Linn (Linn drum machine) - drums

On "Is She Good to You?" and "Give It All Up For Love":

- Paul Riser - string and horn arrangements
- Gene Orloff (concertmaster), Matthew Raimondi, Sanford Allen, Max Ellen, John Pintavalle, Charles Libove, Elliot Rosoff, Regis Iandiorio, Stanley Hunte, Seymour Wakschul - violin
- Alfred Brown, Julien Barber, Harry Zaratzian, Richard E. Spencer - viola
- Eugene Moye, Jesse Levy, Fred Zlotkin - cello
- Jon Faddis, Randy Brecker - trumpet
- Dave Bargeron - trombone
- Lawrence Feldman - tenor saxophone

Additional personnel

- Andrew Biscomb – Sleeve design
- Tony McGee – Inner photography
- Peter Barrett – Sleeve design
- Julian Broad – Cover photography
- Jason Barron, Les Sharma, Paul Waterman, Dean Murphy, Chris McDonnell, Jesse Tranbury, Martin Neary – Assistant engineers
- Jay Newland – Recording engineer
- Sandy Palmer – Assistant engineer

== Charts ==
Chart (1993)	Peak position
German Albums (Offizielle Top 100)	95
UK Albums (Official Charts)	46
