= Megarama '89 =

Single by Bananarama
- Released: 1989
- Genre: Pop, dance
- Label: London Records
- Songwriters: Sara Dallin; Siobhan Fahey; Keren Woodward; Jolley & Swain; Stock Aitken Waterman; John Lennon; Paul McCartney; Gary DeCarlo; Dale Frashuer; Paul Leka; Robbie van Leeuwen

Bananarama singles chronology
"Cruel Summer '89" (1989)	"Megarama '89" (1989)	"Only Your Love" (1990)

"Megarama '89" is a megamix of songs by the English girl group Bananarama. It was released as a single in 1989 in Germany, Japan and France. The French single differs from the version released in Germany and Japan.

The megamix does not appear on any of Bananarama's albums and has not been included on any of the group's greatest hits packages. The single had its greatest success in France, where it peaked at number 17.

Bananarama recordings which are sampled on this track include:

- "Na Na Hey Hey Kiss Him Goodbye"
- "Cruel Summer"
- "Love in the First Degree"
- "I Heard a Rumour"
- "Shy Boy"
- "Venus"
- "Robert De Niro's Waiting..."
- "Help!"
- "Love in the Factory"

"Love in the Factory" was the B-side to the charity single "Help!", which was recorded by Bananarama and Lananeeneenoonoo. It was a comedy sketch, which included a parody of Bananarama's "Love in the First Degree".

== Track listings ==
CD5 French release [London Records 886 791-2]

1. "Megarama '89" (Edit) - (3:52)
  Featuring "Cruel Summer" / "Na Na Hey Hey" / "Love in the First Degree" / "Venus"
  Produced by Swain + Jolley / Stock, Aitken + Waterman
  Megamix and additional production by Alan Coulthard for DMC (UK)
2. "Megarama '89" (Full Length Version) - (8:40)
  Featuring "Na Na Hey Hey" / "Cruel Summer" / "Love in the First Degree" / "I Heard a Rumour" / "Shy Boy" / "Venus" / "Robert De Niro's Waiting" / "Help!"
  Produced by Swain + Jolley / Stock, Aitken + Waterman
  Megamix and additional production by Dimitri
3. "Venus" (The Greatest Remix Edit) - (3:40)
  Produced by Stock / Aitken / Waterman
  Remixed by Phil Harding & Ian Curnow

CD5 German release [London Records 886 755-2]

1. "Megarama '89" (Full Length Version) - (8:37)
  Produced by Swaine + Jolley / Stock, Aitken + Waterman
  Megamix and additional production by Alan Coulthard for DMC (UK)
2. "I Heard a Rumour" (Corporation Of Bananarama Remix) - (5:40)
  Remixed by Freddy Bastone
3. "Venus" (The Greatest Remix) - (7:43)
  Produced by Stock / Aitken / Waterman
  Remixed by Phil Harding & Ian Curnow
