= Nathan Jones (song) =

1971 single by The Supremes

- Sleeve of the Dutch single

Single by the Supremes

from the album Touch
- B-side: "Happy (Is a Bumpy Road)"
- Released: April 15, 1971
- Recorded: December 17, 1970
- Studio: Hitsville U.S.A. (Studio A)
- Genre: R&B; soul; pop
- Length: 3:02 (single/album version)
- Label: Motown
- Songwriters: Kathy Wakefield; Leonard Caston
- Producer: Frank Wilson

The Supremes singles chronology
"River Deep – Mountain High" (1970)	"Nathan Jones" (1971)	"You Gotta Have Love in Your Heart" (1971)

Touch track listing
- 10 tracks Side one: 1. "This Is the Story"; 2. "Nathan Jones"; 3. "Here Comes the Sunrise"; 4. "Love It Came to Me This Time"; 5. "Johnny Raven"; Side two: 6. "Have I Lost You"; 7. "Time and Love"; 8. "Touch"; 9. "Happy (Is a Bumpy Road)"; 10. "It's So Hard for Me to Say Goodbye"

"Nathan Jones" is a song by American girl group the Supremes from their 23rd studio album, Touch (1971). It was released on April 15, 1971, as the album's lead single. Produced by Frank Wilson and written by Kathy Wakefield and Leonard Caston, "Nathan Jones" was one of eight top-40 entries the Supremes recorded after its original frontwoman, Diana Ross, left the group for a solo career.

== Background ==
The song centers around a woman's longing for her former lover, named Nathan Jones, who left her nearly a year ago "to ease [his] mind." Suffering through the long separation ("Winter's past, spring, and fall") without any contact or communication between herself and Jones, the narrator is no longer in love with Jones, remarking that "Nathan Jones/you've been gone too long".

== Supremes version ==
"Nathan Jones" is an unusual entry among the Supremes' singles repertoire for several reasons: all three members of the group (Jean Terrell, Mary Wilson, and Cindy Birdsong) sing the song's lead vocal in unison. Clydie King was asked to sing along with the group to give the song a fuller vocal sound. While working on the song, producer Frank Wilson had in mind a rock music style of phrasing, resulting in the unison vocals. The vocals were dubbed repeatedly to create a layered harmonic tone. In addition, Frank Wilson had his engineer, Cal Harris, employ what are now considered classic studio sensibilities: They took the Funk Brothers' backing tracks for "Nathan Jones" and gave them a phase-shifting sound at various points during the song. This was accomplished by either using a second recorder (as the Beatles would have done) or (less likely) an outboard processor such as the blue faced MXR flanger.

Released as a single on April 15, 1971, along with "Happy (Is a Bumpy Road)" as its B-side, "Nathan Jones" peaked at number 16 on the Billboard Pop Singles chart and number eight on the Billboard R&B chart. The single reached number five on the UK Singles Chart. "Nathan Jones" was the most successful single released from the Supremes' 23rd studio album, Touch.

=== Personnel ===
- Lead and background vocals by Jean Terrell, Mary Wilson, Cindy Birdsong
- Additional vocals by Clydie King
- Instrumentation by the Funk Brothers
- Arranged by Jerry Long and David Van De Pitte
- Engineering by Cal Harris
- Mixed By Russ Terrana

=== Charts ===
Weekly charts

Chart (1971)	Peak position
Belgium (Ultratop 50 Wallonia)	42
Canada Top Singles (RPM)	15
UK Singles (Official Charts)	5
US Billboard Hot 100	16
US Adult Contemporary (Billboard)	29
US Hot R&B/Hip-Hop Songs (Billboard)	8
US Cashbox Top 100	10
US Cashbox R&B	10
US Record World Singles	8
US Record World R&B Singles	9

Year-end charts

Chart (1971)	Rank
UK Singles (OCC)	69
US Cashbox R&B	68

=== Sales ===
Region	Certification	Certified units/sales
United States	—	1,000,000

== Bananarama version ==
"Nathan Jones"

Single by Bananarama

from the album Greatest Hits Collection
- B-side: "Once in a Lifetime"
- Released: November 7, 1988
- Recorded: August 1988
- Genre: Pop; synthpop
- Length: 5:12 (album version)
- Label: London
- Songwriters: Kathy Wakefield; Leonard Caston
- Producer: Stock Aitken Waterman

Bananarama singles chronology
"Love, Truth and Honesty" (1988)	"Nathan Jones" (1988)	"Help!" (1989)

Music video
- "Nathan Jones" on YouTube

"Nathan Jones" was covered in 1987 by the English girl group Bananarama on their album Wow!, and was released in 1988 as the second single from their first compilation The Greatest Hits Collection, on which it appears in a different version from the previous album's one.

=== Versions ===
There are three distinct versions of Bananarama's rendition of the song.

The first version was released on their 1987 album Wow!, with their original line-up. This version was also featured on the soundtrack to the 1988 film Rain Man. Some of the vocals were sampled on their "I Heard a Rumour" B-side song "Clean Cut Boy".

After Siobhan Fahey was replaced by Jacquie O'Sullivan, Bananarama re-recorded the song (with completely new vocal and instrumental arrangements), dubbed the Psycho Mix. This new version was initially included on vinyl and cassette issues of Greatest Hits Collection. It was then remixed and released as a single, peaking at number 15 on the UK Singles Chart. This version is considered the "official" version of the song, and is the version used for the accompanying music video.

A third version of the single, the Dave Ford Mix, while similar to the Psycho Mix, opens with a staccato synthesiser instead of the single-note of the Psycho Mix, and includes more prominent synthesiser throughout. It uses the vocals from the Psycho Mix, although brought more to the front of the instrumentation. This mix appears on the Canadian version of Greatest Hits Collection, and is the version which most closely resembles how it is heard when Bananarama plays live. (This mix is alternatively known as the "Analogue" mix, as it was never issued on CD until the "Megarama" compilation in 2015).

All three versions have 12″ remixes available.

=== Critical reception ===
Upon the single release Jerry Smith of British magazine Music Week expressed the assurance that Stock Aitken Waterman treatment of one of finest hits of "The Supremes as the most successful all girl group" will continue the success of "Nana girls."

Retrospectively, in 2021, British magazine Classic Pop ranked the song number 12 in their list of 'Top 40 Stock Aitken Waterman songs'.

=== Music video ===
The music video, directed by Andy Morahan, featured the girls performing the song with vogue-style choreography with four male dancers dressed in British-style suits, hats, and umbrellas. Their performance is interspersed with shots of them strutting down a fashion catwalk in three different outfits, reflecting the three different seasons mentioned in the song (winter, spring, fall/autumn), and performing the main choreography in yet a fourth change of wardrobe. Sara and Keren are seen sharing the same black-with-copper-coloured-leaves jacket throughout.

Individual shots of the girls are accompanied by floating images of fruits and art objects, such as vases and statues.

The video was nominated for British Video of the Year at the 1989 Brit Awards, but lost to Michael Jackson's "Smooth Criminal".

=== Performances ===
The group performed the song on several popular shows of the day, including Top of the Pops, The Great Big British Pop Machine, at the 1988 Royal Variety Performance in the presence of the Queen Mother and, famously, on the Terry Wogan show, in which Keren is seen doing the first verse choreography during the second verse. None of these appearances feature live vocals.

=== Track listings ===
- 7-inch single / Japanese 3-inch CD single
1. "Nathan Jones" – 3:18
2. "Once in a Lifetime" – 4:05
- 12-inch single
1. "Nathan Jones" (Extended Version) – 5:12
2. "Nathan Jones" (Instrumental Dub Mix) – 3:18
3. "Once in a Lifetime" – 4:05
- US 12-inch single
1. "Nathan Jones" (Psycho Mix) – 6:27
2. "Nathan Jones" (Instrumental Dub Mix) – 3:18
3. "Nathan Jones" (Bass Tone Mix) – 5:07
4. "Once in a Lifetime" – 4:05
- UK CD single / Japanese CD mini-album
1. "Nathan Jones" (Extended Version) – 5:11
2. "Venus" (Extended Version) – 7:25
3. "Once in a Lifetime" – 4:04
- Japanese CD mini-album (remix)
1. "Nathan Jones" (Psycho Mix) – 6:24
2. "I Want You Back" (Extended European Version) – 7:55
3. "Once in a Lifetime" – 4:05

=== Personnel ===
- Sara Dallin – vocals
- Jacquie O'Sullivan – vocals
- Siobhan Fahey – vocals
- Keren Woodward – vocals, bass guitar

=== Charts ===
1988–1989 weekly chart performance for "Nathan Jones"
Chart (1988–1989)	Peak position
Australia (ARIA)	59
Belgium (Ultratop 50 Flanders)	22
Europe (European Hot 100 Singles)	49
Europe (European Airplay Top 50)	39
Finland (Suomen virallinen lista)	3
Ireland (IRMA)	16
Israel (IBA)	8
Luxembourg (Radio Luxembourg)	9
Netherlands (Single Top 100)	73
New Zealand (Recorded Music NZ)	22
UK Singles (Official Charts)	15
UK Dance (Music Week)	10

== Other versions ==
"Nathan Jones" has also been remade by:

- Paul Davis (album Cool Night, 1981)
- Nicolette Larson (album All Dressed Up and No Place to Go, 1982).
