= Wow! (Bananarama album) =

Studio album by Bananarama
- Released: 7 September 1987
- Genres: Pop; dance-pop; synth-pop; hi-NRG
- Length: 42:39
- Label: London
- Producer: Stock Aitken Waterman

Bananarama chronology
True Confessions (1986)	Wow! (1987)	The Greatest Hits Collection (1988)

Singles from Wow!
- 1. "I Heard a Rumour" Released: 22 June 1987; 2. "Love in the First Degree" Released: 21 September 1987; 3. "I Can't Help It" Released: 28 December 1987; 4. "I Want You Back" Released: 28 March 1988

Wow! is the fourth studio album by the English group Bananarama, released on 7 September 1987 by London Records. The album was entirely produced and co-written with the Stock Aitken Waterman production trio. Tensions between group member Siobhan Fahey and Stock, Aitken and Waterman regarding songwriting input and lyrical content prompted Fahey's departure from Bananarama five months after its release. The album reached number 26 on the UK Albums Chart and number 44 on the US Billboard 200, while peaking at number one in Australia. The album was certified gold by the British Phonographic Industry (BPI) on 3 February 1988.

== Background and writing ==
With Wow!, Bananarama's sound successfully shifted towards dance-oriented Europop under the direction of Pete Waterman, but the creative process on the project was often fraught, with Matt Aitken describing the band's contribution to songwriting as minimal outside of suggesting song titles. Karen Hewitt, who was the engineer at the songwriting sessions, made clear that Bananarama very much tried to be involved in the creative process but that this was not made easy by Aitken and Mike Stock, who wanted to work very quickly. Bananarama were, however, very assertive and opinionated during the sessions.

While Siobhan Fahey often clashed with Waterman, and claimed she was responsible for having him banned from the studio, tensions during recording of the album commonly centred on a struggle for dominance between Aitken and the band. By the time the album's fourth single, "I Want You Back", was released in March 1988, Fahey had been replaced with Jacquie O'Sullivan, who re-recorded Fahey's vocals for the single version of the song. Fahey would resurface later in 1988 with her new band, Shakespears Sister. Wow! was reissued in 2013 as a three-disc deluxe edition, including "Reason for Living", which is an early version of "I Want You Back".

== Critical reception ==
Professional ratings
Review scores
Source	Rating
AllMusic	3/5 stars
The Baltimore Sun	5/5 stars
Classic Pop	4/5 stars
Number One	5 1/2/10
Q	3/5 stars
Record Collector	3/5 stars
Record Mirror	2/5
The Rolling Stone Album Guide	3/5 stars
Smash Hits	8/10
Stylus Magazine	B

American magazine Cashbox placed Wow! in its "Out of the Box" section among the best albums of the week, with the comment: "The songwriting/production team of Stock/Aitken/Waterman has laid down the funky programmed synth grooves in full force on this effort destined for serious airplay." Writing for Smash Hits, Chris Heath found that the album contains four "rather brilliant" songs – "I Heard a Rumour", "Bad for Me", "Once in a Lifetime" and "Love in the First Degree" – while "the rest isn't bad either though there are a few bits where they still sound completely useless. Thank goodness for that." To Charles Merwin from Stylus Magazine, "It's probably the group's most underrated record. Lead single "I Heard a Rumour" still holds up as a shining example of hi-NRG pop, while the cover of the 1971 Supremes song "Nathan Jones" is an exceptional update, both soulful and surreal. Even the ballad “Come Back” shines."

Retrospectively, Jose F. Promis of AllMusic praised the album's "quite intoxicating" singles, but criticised "Some Girls" as "dated" and "Strike It Rich" as "an inferior version of 'I Can't Help It'", while finding that "Bad for Me" "unintentionally highlights the trio's vocal limitations"; however, he concluded that Wow! is still "sure to please fans of Bananarama, or any fans of the Stock, Aitken & Waterman sound". In 2018, Mark Elliott of Classic Pop listed Wow! as the second-best album produced by Stock Aitken Waterman, commenting that "Bananarama's decision to embrace high-camp pop was a commercial triumph".

== Track listing ==
All songs written by Sara Dallin, Siobhan Fahey, Keren Woodward, Mike Stock, Matt Aitken and Pete Waterman, except where noted.

LP

1. "I Can't Help It" – 3:32
2. "I Heard a Rumour" – 3:25
3. "Some Girls" – 4:19
4. "Love in the First Degree" – 3:33
5. "Once in a Lifetime" – 4:05
6. "Strike It Rich" – 3:25
7. "Bad for Me" – 3:39
8. "Come Back" – 3:40 (Richard Feldman, Nick Trevisick)
9. "Nathan Jones" – 5:12 (Kathy Wakefield, Leonard Caston)
10. "I Want You Back" – 3:53

CD and cassette

1. "I Can't Help It" – 3:32
2. "I Heard a Rumour" – 3:25
3. "Some Girls" (12" Version) – 5:47
4. "Love in the First Degree" – 3:33
5. "Once in a Lifetime" – 4:05
6. "Strike It Rich" (12" version) – 6:01
7. "Bad for Me" – 3:39
8. "Come Back" – 3:40 (Richard Feldman, Nick Trevisick)
9. "Nathan Jones" – 5:12 (Kathy Wakefield, Leonard Caston)
10. "I Want You Back" – 3:53

Australian CD (CDLIB5146)

1. "I Can't Help It" – 3:32
2. "I Heard a Rumour" – 3:25
3. "Some Girls" – 4:19
4. "Love in the First Degree" – 3:33
5. "Once in a Lifetime" – 4:05
6. "Strike It Rich" – 3:25
7. "Bad for Me" – 3:39
8. "Come Back" – 3:40 (Richard Feldman, Nick Trevisick)
9. "Nathan Jones" – 5:12 (Kathy Wakefield, Leonard Caston)
10. "I Want You Back" – 3:47
11. "Some Girls" (12" Version) – 5:47
12. "Strike It Rich" (12" Version) – 6:01
13. "The Bananarama Mega-Mix" – 7:31

LP (limited edition double vinyl)

1. "I Can't Help It" – 3:32
2. "I Heard a Rumour" – 3:25
3. "Some Girls" – 4:19
4. "Love in the First Degree" – 3:33
5. "Once in a Lifetime" – 4:05
6. "Strike It Rich" – 3:25
7. "Bad for Me" – 3:39
8. "Come Back" – 3:40 (Richard Feldman, Nick Trevisick)
9. "Nathan Jones" – 5:12 (Kathy Wakefield, Leonard Caston)
10. "I Want You Back" – 3:53
11. "The Bananarama Mega-Mix" – 7:26
12. "Mr. Sleaze" (Rare Groove Remix)
13. "Ecstasy" (Wild Style) – 5:37

2007 CD re-issue bonus tracks

1. "I Can't Help It" – 3:32
2. "I Heard a Rumour" – 3:25
3. "Some Girls" – 4:21
4. "Love in the First Degree" – 3:33
5. "Once in a Lifetime" – 4:05
6. "Strike it Rich" – 2:18
7. "Bad for Me" – 3:39
8. "Come Back" – 3:40 (Richard Belman, Nick Trevisick)
9. "Nathan Jones" – 5:12 (Kathy Wakefield, Leonard Caston)
10. "I Want You Back" – 3:53
11. "Clean Cut Boy" (Party Size) – 4:39 (Sara Dallin, Siobhan Fahey, Keren Woodward, Ian Curnow)
12. "Mr. Sleaze" – 4:44
13. "Ecstasy" (Wild Style) – 5:37
14. "Nathan Jones" (Psycho 7-inch edit) – 3:03 (Kathy Wakefield, Leonard Caston)
15. "I Want You Back" (Single Version) – 3:47
16. "Amnesia" (Theme from The Roxy) – 6:28 (Mike Stock, Matt Aitken, Pete Waterman)
17. "Nathan Jones" (single version) – 3:18 (Kathy Wakefield, Leonard Caston)

2013 deluxe edition 2CD/DVD re-issue

Disc 1

1. "I Can't Help It" – 3:32
2. "I Heard a Rumour" – 3:25
3. "Some Girls" – 4:19
4. "Love in the First Degree" – 3:33
5. "Once in a Lifetime" – 4:05
6. "Strike It Rich" – 3:25
7. "Bad for Me" – 3:39
8. "Come Back" – 3:40 (Richard Belman, Nick Trevisick)
9. "Nathan Jones" (Bass Tone Mix) – 5:34 (Kathy Wakefield, Leonard Caston)
10. "I Want You Back" – 3:53
11. "Clean Cut Boy" (Party Size) – 4:43
12. "Mr Sleaze" – 4:49
13. "Ecstasy" – 4:11
14. "Amnesia" (12" extended version) – 6:26
15. "I Heard a Rumour" (Horoscope Mix) – 5:57
16. "Love in the First Degree" (Jailers Mix with intro) – 6:19
17. "I Can't Help It" (extended club mix) – 8:03

Disc 2

1. "Love in the First Degree" (Love in the House Mix) – 8:33
2. "I Heard a Rumour" (House Mix) – 7:22
3. "I Can't Help It" (The Hammond Version Excursion) – 6:33
4. "Reason for Living" (12" master) – 6:08
5. "Some Girls" (12" version) – 5:46
6. "Strike It Rich" (12" version) – 5:59
7. "I Heard a Rumour" (original 12" mix) – 7:06
8. "Nathan Jones" (original 12" mix) – 5:45
9. "I Want You Back" (original 12" mix) – 7:18
10. "Ecstasy" (Chicago House Stylee) – 5:57
11. "I Heard a Rumour" (dub) – 5:18
12. "Mr Sleaze" (Rare Groove Remix) – 6:02

DVD

1. "I Heard a Rumour"
2. "Love in the First Degree"
3. "Mr Sleaze"
4. "I Can't Help It"
5. "I Want You Back"
6. "Love, Truth and Honesty"
7. "Nathan Jones"
8. "Help!"
9. "I Can't Help It" (12" version)
10. "I Want You Back" (alternative version)
11. "I Heard a Rumour" (on Top of the Pops)
12. "I Want You Back" (on Going Live)
13. "Love, Truth and Honesty" (on Top of the Pops)
14. "Nathan Jones" (on Wogan)

2018 Collector's edition

1. "I Can't Help It" – 3:33
2. "I Heard A Rumour" – 3:26
3. "Some Girls" – 4:21
4. "Love In The First Degree" – 3:33
5. "Once In A Lifetime" – 4:05
6. "Strike It Rich"– 3:28
7. "Bad For Me" – 3:39
8. "Come Back" – 3:41
9. "Nathan Jones" (Bass Tone Mix) – 5:34
10. "I Want You Back" – 3:53
11. "Mr. Sleaze" – 4:49
12. "I Heard A Rumour" (Horoscope Mix) – 5:58
13. "Love In The First Degree" (Jailers Mix) – 6:09
14. "I Can't Help It" (Extended Club Mix) – 8:04
15. "I Want You Back" (Extended European Mix) – 7:55
16. "Nathan Jones" (Extended Version) – 5:12

Notes on "Some Girls" and "Strike It Rich"

- The original LP release of the album included album versions of both songs (4:19 and 3:25, respectively).
- The original CD included 12-inch versions ( 5:47 and 6:00, respectively).
- The 2007 re-issue of Wow! contains the album version of "Some Girls" and contains the shortened faded version of "Strike it Rich" (12" Version) from the "Love, Truth & Honesty – The Remixes" 12" single – 2:18.

Notes on "Nathan Jones" and "I Want You Back"

The album contains what is now known as the 'Bass Tone Mix' of "Nathan Jones" and most versions of Wow! contain the album version of "I Want You Back", with some exceptions. Notably, the Australian CD and cassette releases contain the single version of "I Want You Back", which was re-recorded with Jacquie O'Sullivan though this was not noted in the booklet or on the release packaging.

== Personnel ==
Bananarama

- Sara Dallin – vocals
- Siobhan Fahey – vocals
- Keren Woodward – vocals
- Jacquie O'Sullivan – vocals on the single version of "I Want You Back" (uncredited)

Musicians

- Mike Stock – keyboards and Linn programmes
- Matt Aitken – guitar, keyboards and Linn programmes
- John O'Hara – keyboards
- A. Linn – drums
- Pete Waterman – additional drum patterns
- Ian Curnow – Fairlight programming
- Pete Hammond – mixer
- Phil Harding – assistant mixer
- Mark McGuire – engineer
- Burni Adams – tape operator
- Freddy Bastone – mixer on "Nathan Jones"

Additional personnel

- Hillary Shaw – manager
- Peter Barrett – sleeve design
- Andrew Biscomb – sleeve design
- Andy Earl – photography
- Carrie Branovan – additional photography
- Herb Ritts – gatefold sleeve photography

== Charts ==
=== Weekly charts ===
Weekly chart performance for Wow!
Chart (1987–1988)	Peak position
Australian Albums (ARIA)	1
Canada Top Albums/CDs (RPM)	32
European Albums (Music & Media)	78
Finnish Albums (Suomen virallinen lista)	11
German Albums (Offizielle Top 100)	65
Japanese Albums (Oricon)	24
New Zealand Albums (RMNZ)	38
Spanish Albums (AFYVE)	49
Swedish Albums (Sverigetopplistan)	31
Swiss Albums (Schweizer Hitparade)	22
UK Albums (Official Charts)	26
US Billboard 200	44
Zimbabwean Albums (ZIMA)	2

=== Year-end chart ===
Year-end chart performance for Wow!
Chart (1988)	Position
Australian Albums (ARIA)	22

== Certifications and sales ==
Certifications and sales for Wow!
Region	Certification	Certified units/sales
Canada (Music Canada)	Gold	50,000^{^}
Hong Kong (IFPI Hong Kong)	Gold	10,000^{*}
Singapore	—	10,000
United Kingdom (BPI)	Gold	100,000^{^}
^{*} Sales figures based on certification alone.^{^} Shipments figures based on certification alone.
