= Help! (song) =

1965 single by the Beatles

- US picture sleeve

Single by the Beatles

from the album Help!
- B-side: "I'm Down"
- Released: 23 July 1965
- Recorded: 13 April 1965 (stereo); 13 April and 24 May 1965 (mono)
- Studio: EMI, London
- Genre: Folk rock
- Length: 2:18
- Label: Parlophone (UK); Capitol (US)
- Songwriter: Lennon–McCartney
- Producer: George Martin

The Beatles UK singles chronology
| "Ticket to Ride" (1965) | "Help!" (1965) | "We Can Work It Out" / "Day Tripper" (1965) |

The Beatles US singles chronology
| "Ticket to Ride" (1965) | "Help!" (1965) | "Yesterday" (1965) |

Promotional film
- "Help!" on YouTube

"Help!" is a song by the English rock band the Beatles that served as the title song for the 1965 film and the band's accompanying soundtrack album. It was released as a single in July 1965, and was number one for three weeks in the United States and the United Kingdom. Credited to Lennon–McCartney, "Help!" was written by John Lennon with some assistance from Paul McCartney. During an interview with Playboy in 1980, Lennon recounted: "The whole Beatles thing was just beyond comprehension. I was subconsciously crying out for help".

The song was ranked at number 29 on Rolling Stone's 500 Greatest Songs of All Time in 2004 and 2010, and then was re-ranked at number 447 in the 2021 list. In 2008, the 1965 Capitol Records recording of "Help!" was inducted into the Grammy Hall of Fame.

== Composition ==
The documentary series The Beatles Anthology revealed that Lennon wrote the lyrics of the song to express his stress after the Beatles' quick rise to success. "I was fat and depressed and I was crying out for 'Help'", Lennon told Playboy. Writer Ian MacDonald describes the song as the first crack in the protective shell Lennon had built around his emotions during the Beatles' rise to fame, and an important milestone in his songwriting style.

In the 1970 Rolling Stone "Lennon Remembers" interviews, Lennon said that the song was one of his favourites among the Beatles songs he wrote. In these interviews, Lennon said he felt that "Help!" and "Strawberry Fields Forever" were his most honest, genuine Beatles songs and not just songs "written to order". According to Lennon's cousin and boyhood friend Stanley Parkes, "Help!" was written after Lennon "came in from the studio one night. 'God,' he said, 'they've changed the title of the film: it's going to be called 'Help!' now. So I've had to write a new song with the title called 'Help!'."

According to McCartney, he was called in "to complete it", providing the "countermelody" arrangement, on 4 April 1965 at Lennon's house in Weybridge.

== Recording ==
The Beatles recorded "Help!" in 12 takes on 13 April 1965 using four-track equipment. The first nine takes concentrated on the instrumental backing. The descending lead guitar riff that precedes each verse proved to be difficult, so by take 4 it was decided to postpone it for an overdub. To guide the later overdub by George Harrison, Lennon thumped the beat on his acoustic guitar body, which can be heard in the final stereo mix. Lead and backing vocals were recorded twice onto take 9, along with a tambourine. A reduction mix was applied to the two vocal tracks, taking three attempts (takes 10 to 12), freeing up a track for the lead guitar overdub. This was the group's first use of two 4-track machines for "bouncing".

The vocals were re-recorded for the film during a session on 24 May 1965 at CTS Studios, a facility specializing in post-synchronisation. In addition to attempting a better vocal performance, the session might have been done to eliminate the tambourine (which had been on the same track as the vocals) since no tambourine appeared in the film sequence. With the new vocals, a mono mix was created at CTS Studios which was used for the film soundtrack. Mixes for record releases were prepared on 18 June. For the mono version, George Martin decided to use a mix of the opening chorus of take 12 edited to the remainder of the CTS film mix. Because all instruments were combined on a single track for the CTS session, it could not be used for a stereo mix, so the stereo mix was made from take 12.

This film version of the song was only heard on the original VHS releases of the movie, later replaced by the stereo mixes. A true release was never issued. New mixes were created for releases of the Help! CD (1987), the Love album (2006), and the Help! DVD (2007).

== Releases ==
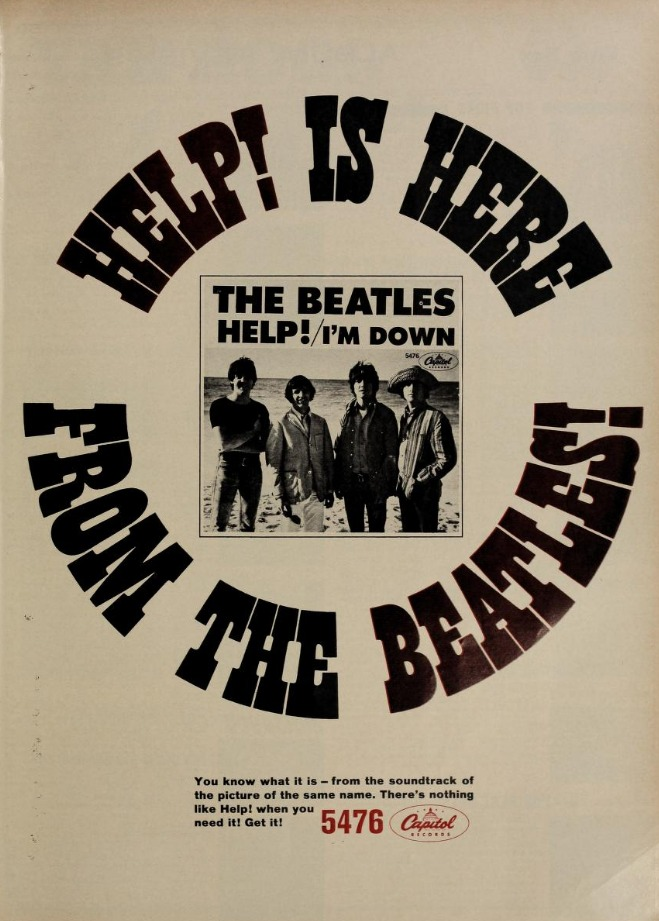
Advertisement for "Help!"

"Help!" went to number 1 on both the UK and US singles charts in late summer 1965. It was the fourth of six number 1 singles in a row on the American charts: "I Feel Fine", "Eight Days a Week", "Ticket to Ride", "Help!", "Yesterday" and "We Can Work It Out". At the following year's Ivor Novello Awards, "Help!" was named as the second best-selling single of 1965, behind "We Can Work It Out". "Help!" was nominated in four categories at the 1966 Grammy Awards but failed to win in any of them.

The song appears on the Help! LP, the US Help! soundtrack, 1962–1966, the Imagine: John Lennon soundtrack, 1, Love, and The Capitol Albums, Volume 2. The mono version (with different vocals and no tambourine) was included on the Beatles' US Rarities LP and in The Beatles in Mono collection. The American soundtrack album included a James Bond-type introduction to the song, followed by a caesura just before the opening lyric. No such introduction appeared on the British soundtrack album, nor was it included in the released single in either country.

Although Lennon was proud of "Help!" and the honesty it conveyed, he expressed regret that the Beatles had recorded it at such a fast tempo in the interests of giving the track more commercial appeal. Music critic Dave Marsh disagreed, saying: "'Help!' isn't a compromise; it's bursting with vitality … [Lennon] sounds triumphant, because he's found a group of kindred spirits who are offering the very spiritual assistance and emotional support for which he's begging. Paul's echoing harmonies, Ringo's jaunty drums, the boom of George's guitar speak to the heart of Lennon's passion, and though they cannot cure the wound, at least they add a note of reassurance that he's not alone with his pain."

Cash Box described "Help!" as a "hard-driving, rollicking ode about a poor lad who loses some of his independence after he becomes involved with a new gal" that is "sure of garnering instantaneous sales acceptance". Upon the single release, Record World correctly predicted that it would go to No. 1.

== Promotional films ==
Picture taken during the filming of the second promotional film

The Beatles filmed the title performance for the movie Help! on 22 April 1965. The same footage (without the darts and credits seen in the film sequence) was used as a clip to promote the release of the single. It was shown starting in July 1965 on programmes such as Top of the Pops and Thank Your Lucky Stars. They made another promotional clip of "Help!" on 23 November 1965 for inclusion in the year-end recap special of Top of the Pops. Directed by Joseph McGrath, the black-and-white clip shows the group miming to the song while sitting astride a workbench. Starr holds an umbrella overhead throughout the song, which becomes useful as fake snow falls during the final verse. The November 1965 promo was included in the Beatles' 2015 video compilation 1.

== Live performances ==
The Beatles performed "Help!" live on the 1 August 1965 broadcast of Blackpool Night Out, which was included in the Anthology 2 album and shown during The Beatles Anthology documentary. On 14 August, the group recorded a live performance of "Help!" and five other songs for The Ed Sullivan Show, broadcast the following month; the show is available on the DVD The 4 Complete Ed Sullivan Shows Starring The Beatles.

"Help!" was included in the set list for The Beatles' 1965 US tour. The 15 August performance at Shea Stadium was seen in the 1966 documentary The Beatles at Shea Stadium, although the audio for the song was re-recorded prior to release. The group's 29 August performance at the Hollywood Bowl was chosen for the 1977 album The Beatles at the Hollywood Bowl. The final live concert performances of "Help!" took place on The Beatles' 1965 UK tour in December.

== Personnel ==
According to Ian MacDonald:

- John Lennon – double-tracked vocals, twelve-string acoustic rhythm guitar
- Paul McCartney – backing vocals, bass guitar
- George Harrison – backing vocals, lead guitar
- Ringo Starr – drums, tambourine

== Charts ==
=== Weekly charts ===
1965 weekly chart performance for "Help!"
| Chart (1965) | Peak position |
|---|---|
| Australia (Kent Music Report) | 1 |
| Austria (Ö3 Austria Top 40) | 5 |
| Belgium (Ultratop 50 Flanders) | 5 |
| Belgium (Ultratop 50 Wallonia) | 5 |
| Canada Top Singles (RPM) | 1 |
| Finland (Suomen virallinen lista) | 2 |
| Hong Kong | 1 |
| Ireland (IRMA) | 1 |
| Italy (Musica e dischi) | 3 |
| Netherlands (Dutch Top 40) | 1 |
| Netherlands (Single Top 100) | 1 |
| New Zealand (Lever Hit Parade) | 1 |
| Norway (VG-lista) | 1 |
| South Africa (Springbok Radio) | 1 |
| Spain (Promusicae) | 1 |
| Sweden (Kvällstoppen) | 1 |
| Sweden (Tio i Topp) | 2 |
| UK Singles (Official Charts) | 1 |
| US Billboard Hot 100 | 1 |
| US Cash Box Top 100 | 1 |
| West Germany (GfK) | 2 |

1976 weekly chart performance for "Help!"
| Chart (1976) | Peak position |
|---|---|
| Ireland (IRMA) | 10 |
| UK Singles (Official Charts) | 37 |

The song reached number one in several other countries in 1965 according to charts listed in Billboard's "Hits of the World" feature at the time: Australia, Hong Kong, New Zealand, and Sweden.

=== Year-end charts ===
1965 year-end chart performance for "Help!"
| Chart (1965) | Position |
|---|---|
| South Africa | 8 |
| US Billboard Hot 100 | 7 |
| US Cash Box Top 100 | 11 |

== Certifications and sales ==
Certifications and sales for "Help!"
| Region | Certification | Certified units/sales |
|---|---|---|
| France | — | 100,000 |
| Italy (FIMI) | Gold | 50,000^{‡} |
| New Zealand (RMNZ) | Platinum | 30,000^{‡} |
| Spain (Promusicae) | Gold | 30,000^{‡} |
| United Kingdom (BPI) | Platinum | 987,769 |
| United States (RIAA) | Gold | 1,000,000^{^} |
^{^} Shipments figures based on certification alone.^{‡} Sales+streaming figures based on certification alone.

== Bananarama version ==
"Help!"

Single by Bananarama & Lananeeneenoonoo

from the album Greatest Hits Collection
- B-side: "Help!" (Straight version) (7-inch); "Love in a Factory" (12-inch)
- Released: 13 February 1989
- Recorded: January 1989
- Studio: PWL, London
- Genre: Pop; parody
- Length: 2:58 (single version); 6:31 (extended version)
- Label: London
- Songwriter: Lennon–McCartney
- Producer: Stock Aitken Waterman

Bananarama singles chronology
| "Nathan Jones" (1988) | "Help!" (1989) | "Cruel Summer '89" (1989) |

British girl group Bananarama covered the song with comedians French & Saunders and Kathy Burke, who were credited as Lananeeneenoonoo, which is a spoof of the Bananarama name. The song was released in February 1989 as the Red Nose Day single to raise money for Comic Relief. It was then included on the 1989 re-release of Bananarama's Greatest Hits Collection album. The single peaked at number three on the UK Singles Chart and was a Top-10 hit in several countries.

=== Background and release ===
In December 1988, comedy duo French and Saunders did a Christmas special sketch that poked fun at Bananarama, with Dawn French playing a character based on Keren Woodward and Jennifer Saunders playing Sara Dallin. Guest comedian Kathy Burke played a character based on Jacquie O'Sullivan. The sketch featured the trio recording music, being interviewed and making a video.

French said she and Saunders were fans of Bananarama, and researched the sketch by watching interviews and talking to sources close to the band. Bananarama said they "saw [the sketch] before it was even on television" and "everyone thought we would be furious... but we really laughed. It was hilarious". O'Sullivan described the sketch, which depicted a sometimes hostile dynamic towards her often drunk character, as accurate.

After the sketch, Comic Relief decided to get in touch with French and Saunders to ask if they would do a single with Bananarama, so long as the latter would agree to it, which they did "without hesitation".

The single was then released in February for the second Red Nose Day. Two-thirds of money from the sales of the single went to relief work in Africa, with the other third going to fight homelessness and drug and alcohol abuse in the UK and Ireland. With the huge popular success of Red Nose Day, the single was also a hit, peaking at number 3 in the UK on the week of Red Nose Day (10 March) and staying at that position the following week. This meant it became Bananarama's joint highest-charting song, along with "Robert De Niro's Waiting" and "Love in the First Degree".

"Help!" was released with a B-side different version of the song, entitled as the bracketed "Straight Version" which removed the comedic parts by Lananeeneenoonoo. The 12-inch single featured another collaboration with Lananeeneenoonoo, "Love In The Factory", which was an improvised conversation sketch comedy featuring the two groups meeting in the studio.

For the 7-inch single release in Europe (outside of the UK) and Japan, the sides were switched, with the "Straight Version" of the song on the A-side. This was due to the fact the three comedians were not so well known outside of the UK.

=== Music video ===
The comedic music video was directed by Andy Morahan and features the members of Bananarama and Lananeeneenoonoo all dressed in matching outfits. Their choreographed performance of the song is interspersed with scenes of the two groups attempting to ski and ride kick scooters around the film studio. Several shirtless male backup dancers — credited as Bassie, Norman, and Paul — accompany them as they perform the song. Lananeeneenoonoo are featured with dialogue in the recording studio, and the production team look on in despair at their attempts at backing vocals.

=== Track listings ===
7-inch: London / LON 222 (UK)

1. "Help!" – 2:58
2. "Help" (Straight Version) – 2:22

7-inch: London / 886 492-7 / SOOP 1111 (Europe & Japan)

1. "Help!" (Straight version) – 2:22
2. "Help!" (Comedy version) – 2:58

12-inch: London / LONX 222 (UK)

1. "Help!" (Extended version) – 6:31
2. "Love In The Factory" (Extended version) – 4:17

CD: London / LONCD 222 (UK)

1. "Help!" – 2:58
2. "Help" (Straight version) – 2:22
3. "Love In The Factory" (Extended version) – 4:17

CD Mini: London / 886 598-3 / P00L 40008 (Germany & Japan)

1. "Help" (Straight Version) – 2:22
2. "Help!" – 2:58

=== Personnel ===
Musicians

- Sara Dallin – vocals
- Jacquie O'Sullivan – vocals
- Keren Woodward – vocals
- Dawn French – backing vocals
- Jennifer Saunders – backing vocals
- Kathy Burke – backing vocals
- Matt Aitken – guitar, keyboards
- Mike Stock – keyboards
- George De Angelis – additional keyboards
- As on other Stock Aitken Waterman productions, the drummer is credited as 'A. Linn' (based on the Linn 9000)

Technical

- Karen Hewitt, Yoyo – engineering
- Pete Hammond – mixing
- Chris McDonnell, Gordon Dennis, Jason Barron, Pete Day, Steve Davies – assistant mixing
- Terry O'Neill – photography

=== Charts ===
==== Weekly charts ====
Weekly chart performance for "Help!" by Bananarama & Lananeeneenoonoo
| Chart (1989) | Peak position |
|---|---|
| Australia (ARIA) | 25 |
| Belgium (Ultratop 50 Flanders) | 9 |
| Denmark (IFPI) | 5 |
| Europe (Eurochart Hot 100) | 9 |
| European Airplay Top 50 (Music & Media) | 6 |
| Finland (Suomen virallinen lista) | 2 |
| France (SNEP) | 6 |
| Ireland (IRMA) | 2 |
| Israel (IBA) | 1 |
| Italy (Musica e dischi) | 15 |
| Italy Airplay (Music & Media) | 3 |
| Luxembourg (Radio Luxembourg) | 2 |
| Netherlands (Dutch Top 40) | 25 |
| Netherlands (Single Top 100) | 24 |
| New Zealand (Recorded Music NZ) | 35 |
| Norway (VG-lista) | 6 |
| Portugal (AFP) | 3 |
| Spain (AFYVE) | 4 |
| Sweden (Sverigetopplistan) | 2 |
| Switzerland (Schweizer Hitparade) | 8 |
| UK Singles (Official Charts) | 3 |
| West Germany (GfK) | 8 |

==== Year-end charts ====
Year-end chart performance for "Help!" by Bananarama & Lananeeneenoonoo
| Chart (1989) | Position |
|---|---|
| Belgium (Ultratop 50 Flanders) | 82 |
| Europe (Eurochart Hot 100) | 26 |
| UK Singles (OCC) | 35 |
| West Germany (Media Control) | 53 |

=== Certifications ===
| Region | Certification | Certified units/sales |
|---|---|---|
| Sweden (GLF) | Gold | 25,000^{^} |
| United Kingdom (BPI) | Silver | 200,000^{^} |
^{^} Shipments figures based on certification alone.

== Other cover versions ==
- Deep Purple recorded a version of the song on their debut album Shades of Deep Purple.
- John Farnham released a much-slower tempo, piano-based ballad version of the song in 1980. His version peaked at No. 8 on the Australian Kent Music Report singles chart.
- Tina Turner recorded a version of Farnham's arrangement of the song. This was recorded prior to, and then included on, her 1984 album Private Dancer. Her version was a top forty hit in several countries, including Belgium, the Netherlands, and the UK.
- The Carpenters recorded the song on their album Close To You, accidentally leaving off the exclamation point. After this, McCartney invited the Carpenters to socialise with him one evening at Strawberry Studios while he was recording the album McGear with his brother Mike. Lennon approved of the cover version, telling Karen, "I think you've got a fabulous voice."
- The Damned's studio take of the song first appeared as the B-side of their 1976 debut single "New Rose". The song is also a mainstay of the band's live shows, being performed in double-time with frenetic vocal delivery from Dave Vanian.
