= The Greatest Hits Collection =

The Greatest Hits Collection may refer to:

- The Greatest Hits Collection (Bananarama album)
- The Greatest Hits Collection (Brooks & Dunn album)
- The Greatest Hits Collection (Alan Jackson album)
- The Greatest Hits Collection (Michelle Wright album)
- The Greatest Hits Collection (video), a Bananarama videos compilation
- Greatest Hits Collection, Vol. 1, an album released by Trace Adkins
- A Collection of His Greatest Hits
- The Greatest Hits Collection II
- DJ: The Hits Collection
- The Greatest Hits Collection (video)

== See also ==
- List of greatest hits albums
- Hits Collection (disambiguation)
