= I Can't Help It (Bananarama song) =

Single by Bananarama

from the album Wow!
- B-side: "Ecstasy"
- Released: November 1987 (US); 28 December 1987 (UK)
- Recorded: July 1986
- Genre: Dance-pop; disco
- Length: 3:32
- Label: London
- Songwriters: Sara Dallin; Siobhan Fahey; Keren Woodward; Mike Stock; Matt Aitken; Pete Waterman
- Producer: Stock Aitken Waterman

Bananarama singles chronology
"Love in the First Degree" (1987)	"I Can't Help It" (1987)	"I Want You Back" (1988)

Music video
- "I Can't Help It" on YouTube

Professional ratings
Review scores
Source	Rating
Number One	4/5 stars

"I Can't Help It" is a song by the English girl group Bananarama from their fourth studio album, Wow! (1987). It was released on 28 December 1987 as the album's third single, except in the United States, where it was the second single (following "I Heard a Rumour"), and Australia, where it served as the fourth single (after "I Want You Back"). The track was co-written and produced by the Stock Aitken Waterman (SAW) trio. The single peaked at number 20 in the UK singles chart, number 27 on the Australian ARIA chart (where it was released in August 1988), and number 47 on the U.S. Billboard Hot 100.

== Background and release ==
This is the final Bananarama single to feature Siobhan Fahey, who announced her departure shortly after its release. The photos on the record sleeve were taken by famous American photographer Herb Ritts, and were recycled for their 1988 compilation, Greatest Hits Collection. The record sleeves for "I Can't Help It" and "Love In The First Degree" were switched with each other for the UK and North American markets. Later, in 2007, the song's extended mixes were the inspiration for former PWL staffer Pete Hammond's remix of Danish group Alphabeat's hit, "Boyfriend".

== Critical reception ==
Max Bell from Number One wrote, "Always somehow around, Bananarama make each new day a thing to look forward to. There are two sorts of B'rama singles, good ones and very good ones and this is the latter variety from the most London group of all. Capital stuff. Excellent video." When announcing the release of the single, Pan-European magazine Music & Media stated: "The confident PWL production recipe strikes again: a bubbling disco beat, a tinge of Nile Rodgers' famous rhythm guitar line and the ever so cheerful vocals of the three ladies". In his dance column published in Record Mirror, James Hamilton considered that the extended version of "I Can't Help It" showed that SAW "kept their Chic influence, in the vocal pattern as well as the choopy guitar, for this Sister Sledge-style shrill 120-0 bpm jittery thudder". Sue Dando of Smash Hits deemed the song as being "exactly the same as any other Bananarama effort – all fizzy and colourful, but really rather monotonous", while noting the singers' bare flesh on the single sleeve.

== Chart performance ==
"I Can't Help It" failed to achieve a top ten entry in any of the main charts of the countries where it was released. In the UK it entered at number 45 on 9 January 1988, reaching a peak of number 20 two weeks later and fell off the chart after six weeks, which was the worst charting performance of a single from Wow! in the UK, regarding both the peak position and the number of weeks on the chart. However, it rose to number nine on the UK Dance chart after a debut at number 30 the previous week, and was present in the top 50 for seven weeks. In other European countries, it reached number 12 in Ireland, number 13 in the Flanders region of Belgium, number 18 in Luxembourg, and was a top-30 hit in other three nations, attaining number 22 in Spain, number 24 in Finland and number 30 in the Netherlands. It missed the top 30 by one place in West Germany, where it achieved its peak in its third position out of an eight-week chart run. On the pan-European charts established by the Music & Media magazine, it peaked at number 68 on the Eurochart Hot 100 singles on which it appeared for a total of seven weeks, and at number 17 on the European Airplay Top 50 with an eight-week chart run.

Outside Europe, "I Can't Help It" managed to enter the top 50 on the Billboard Hot 100, peaking at number 47 in its eighth week, on 9 January 1988, and remained on the chart for 13 weeks. A hit in nightclubs, the song ranked for 11 weeks on the U.S. Hot Dance Club Play chart and attained number seven in its sixth week. In Australia, it reached number 27 twice in September 1988 and ranked in the top 50 for six weeks.

== Music video ==
The accompanying music video for the "I Can't Help It" features muscle men dancing, colourful backdrops, and Sara Dallin and Keren Woodward in a milk bath filled with fruit and naked men. Siobhan Fahey, who was pregnant at the time, also appears but was only shown on camera from the shoulders up. The video was directed by Andy Morahan.

== Track listings ==
- 7-inch single
1. "I Can't Help It" – 3:31
2. "Ecstasy" – 4:10
- UK limited-edition 7-inch single
1. "I Can't Help It" – 3:31
2. "Ecstasy" (Edit) – 2:00
3. "Love in the First Degree" – 3:29
- 12-inch single
1. "I Can't Help It" (Extended Club Mix) – 8:03
2. "Ecstasy" (Chicago House Stylee) – 5:56
- 12-inch single (remix)
1. "I Can't Help It" (The "Hammond Version" Excursion) – 6:24
2. "Ecstasy" (Wild Style) – 5:35
- German CD single
1. "I Can't Help It" (Extended Club Mix) – 8:09
2. "Ecstasy" (Chicago House Stylee) – 4:20
3. "Mr Sleaze" (Rare Groove Remix) – 6:04
- US 12-inch single and cassette
1. "I Can't Help It" (Remix) – 8:03
2. "I Can't Help It" (7″ Version) – 3:38
3. "Mr Sleaze" (Rare Groove Version) – 6:00
4. "Mr Sleaze" (Instrumental) – 4:09
- Canadian 12-inch single
1. "I Can't Help It" (Remix) – 8:03
2. "I Can't Help It" (7″ Version) – 3:38
3. "Mr Sleaze" (Rare Groove Mix) – 6:00

== Personnel ==
Bananarama

- Sara Dallin – vocals
- Siobhan Fahey – vocals
- Keren Woodward – vocals

Additional personnel

- Andrew Biscomb – sleeve design
- Peter Barrett – sleeve design
- Herb Ritts – photography

== Charts ==
1987–1988 weekly chart performance for "I Can't Help It"
Chart (1987–1988)	Peak position
Australia (ARIA)	27
Belgium (Ultratop 50 Flanders)	13
Europe (European Hot 100 Singles)	68
Europe (European Airplay Top 50)	17
Finland (Suomen virallinen lista)	24
Ireland (IRMA)	12
Israel (IBA)	19
Luxembourg (Radio Luxembourg)	18
Netherlands (Dutch Top 40)	26
Netherlands (Single Top 100)	30
Quebec (ADISQ)	39
Spain (AFYVE)	22
UK Singles (OCC)	20
UK Dance (Music Week)	9
US Billboard Hot 100	47
US Dance Club Songs (Billboard) with "Mr. Sleaze"	7
US Dance Singles Sales (Billboard) with "Mr. Sleaze"	21
US Cash Box Top 100	55
West Germany (GfK)	31
