= Preacher Man =

Single by Bananarama

from the album Pop Life
- B-side: "Megalomaniac"
- Released: 24 December 1990
- Genre: Indie dance
- Length: 3:15 (album version); 3:38 (alternative 7-inch mix)
- Label: London
- Songwriters: Sara Dallin; Andy Caine; Youth
- Producer: Youth

Bananarama singles chronology
"Only Your Love" (1990)	"Preacher Man" (1990)	"Long Train Running" (1991)

Music video
- "Preacher Man" on YouTube

"Preacher Man" is a song recorded by the English girl group Bananarama. It appears on the group's fifth studio album, Pop Life (1991), and was released as the album's second single. The track was co-written and produced by Youth with additional production and remix by Shep Pettibone.

"Tripping on Your Love" had been originally slated as the second single from the album, and some promotional singles of the song were sent to radio stations in late 1990. Around this time, group member Sara Dallin contracted meningitis, which delayed the release of the single some months. When she recovered, London Records decided "Preacher Man" was a better choice for a single and so it was released in December 1990. "Tripping on Your Love" was eventually released as the album's fourth single.

The indie dance song became the highest-charting and biggest-selling single released from the Pop Life album, climbing to number 20 on the UK Singles Chart. The single was Bananarama's last appearance in the UK top 20 until "Move in My Direction" in 2005. In Australia, the single peaked at number 147 on the Australian ARIA singles chart. "Preacher Man" was not released in the United States.

The song was performed on the Original Line Up Tour during 2017–2018. Despite being recorded after she left, original member Siobhan Fahey has always liked the song and chose to include it in the setlist.

== Critical reception ==
Everett True from Melody Maker wrote, "Bananarama, still in the forefront of the musical revolution, put out a new record which, stylistically, borrows very heavily from Shakespear's Sister, and, musically, borrows reasonably heavily from Happy Mondays' funk/bass thang. Vocally, of course, they are their usual SAW selves, with an nifty helping hand or two from the ubiquitous Youth. And, all things considered, this is no bad thing." Pan-European magazine Music & Media stated, "Strong hooks and strong looks. A catchy tune with undeniable pop appeal. Watch the striking harp solo in the middle." Andrew Collins from NME said "Bananarama's difficult 'second' indie-dance-glossover single is one."

Gary Crossing from Record Mirror called the song "a supremely contagious dance offering... This has a powerful, gloopy bassline and a wondrous bluesy harmonica bit in the middle". Caroline Sullivan from Smash Hits felt the song sounded like "everything they did with S/A/W", noting "the chugging beat, same slick strings and the harmonica solo." In review of 5 January 1991, Paul Elliott of Sounds considered that this song "melds '70s and '90s dance sounds." In the end Elliott summarized: "Produced by Youth and remixed by Shep Pettibone, it throbs yet sparkles, evocative of the dreamiest, most hypnotic and heady '70s disco raves."

== Music video ==
The accompanying music video for the song featured a man in a tank top tied to a chair in the interrogation room of a prison. As he breaks down and goes crazy, Bananarama and various carnival-like entertainers (such as a midget and a girl in a winged outfit) appear as hallucinations before him. These scenes are intercut with scenes of the girls performing the song in front of candles or standing against a wall. Harmonica player Johnny Mars appears on the video. The video was directed by long-time collaborator Andy Morahan and would be the last video he directed for the group until "Stuff Like That" from In Stereo in 2019.

== Personnel ==
Bananarama

- Sara Dallin – vocals
- Jacquie O'Sullivan – vocals
- Keren Woodward – vocals

Additional musicians

- Peter 'Ski' Schwartz – keyboards

== Charts ==
Weekly chart performance for "Preacher Man"
Chart (1991)	Peak position
Australia (ARIA)	147
Belgium (Ultratop 50 Flanders)	40
Europe (Eurochart Hot 100)	57
Europe (European Hit Radio)	11
Finland (Suomen virallinen lista)	6
Germany (GfK)	46
Ireland (IRMA)	11
Israel (IBA)	11
Italy (Musica e dischi)	42
Luxembourg (Radio Luxembourg)	12
UK Singles (OCC)	20
UK Airplay (Music Week)	3
UK Dance (Music Week)	22

== Release history ==
Release dates and formats for "Preacher Man"
Region	Date	Format(s)	Label(s)	Ref(s).
United Kingdom	24 December 1990	7-inch vinyl; 12-inch vinyl; CD; cassette	London	
United Kingdom	21 January 1991	12-inch remix vinyl	London	
Japan	6 February 1991	Mini-CD; maxi-CD	London	
Australia	18 February 1991	7-inch vinyl; CD; cassette	London	
