= Pop Life (Bananarama album) =

Studio album by Bananarama
- Released: 13 May 1991
- Genres: Dance-pop; hi-NRG
- Length: 47:24
- Label: London
- Producers: Youth; Stock Aitken Waterman; Shep Pettibone; Steve Jolley

Bananarama chronology
The Greatest Hits Collection (1988)	Pop Life (1991)	Please Yourself (1993)

Singles from Pop Life
- 1. "Only Your Love" Released: 16 July 1990; 2. "Preacher Man" Released: 24 December 1990; 3. "Long Train Running" Released: 8 April 1991; 4. "Tripping on Your Love" Released: 22 July 1991

Pop Life is the fifth studio album by the English group Bananarama, released on 13 May 1991 by London Records. It is the only Bananarama studio album which features singer Jacquie O'Sullivan, who replaced Siobhan Fahey following her departure in 1988. This album marks the end of the group's association with the Stock Aitken Waterman production team (they produced only two songs on the album: "Ain't No Cure" and "Heartless") as most of Pop Life was produced by Youth (real name Martin Glover). English singer Zoë provided backing vocals on "Long Train Running". This would be the last album by Bananarama as a trio.

== Background and recording ==
After their first world tour in 1989, Bananarama started recording their fifth album with producers Stock Aitken Waterman (SAW), but found themselves dissatisfied with the majority of the songs resulting from the sessions, although "Ain't No Cure" and "Heartless" were eventually included on the album. The group started looking for other producers, first working with David Z, with whom they recorded "Some Boys"; however, they felt the song did not fit the direction they wanted to follow, and it remained unreleased until 2013. Bananarama then worked with Steve Jolley who, along with Tony Swain, had produced the group's first three records. A song co-written by him, "Is Your Love Strong Enough", ended up on the album, while another remains unreleased.

Bananarama eventually settled on having Youth – who had been an acquaintance of theirs during their early years as a group – produce the majority of the album, with recording sessions taking place at Youth's home studio in Wandsworth. Group members Sara Dallin and Keren Woodward later recalled the sessions fondly, with Dallin noting that in contrast to SAW, who worked at a relatively fast pace, "Youth gave us as much time as we needed to play around with ideas and fully immerse ourselves in the process." Under Youth's direction, the group experimented with newer production techniques on Pop Life, including the use of samples and drum loops. Woodward described the recording process as "very DIY, like going back to the way we worked with the Fun Boy Three", contrasting Pop Life with previous Bananarama records that had been produced in more professional studios.

Pop Life was a departure from Bananarama's previous albums as it incorporates a much more diverse range of musical genres, including flamenco guitar (a cover of the Doobie Brothers song "Long Train Runnin'" featuring Alma de Noche, a pseudonym for the Gipsy Kings), retro-rock ("Only Your Love", "Outta Sight"), acid house ("Tripping on Your Love"), reggae ("What Colour R the Skies Where U Live?"), experimental club ("Megalomaniac"), and their hallmark Eurodisco sound ("Preacher Man", "Ain't No Cure").

Bananarama completely re-recorded the SAW track "Ain't No Cure" with Youth in a more subdued style to fit in better with the other tracks on the album. A furious response from SAW ultimately saw the band relent, however, and include the original SAW version on the album. The song was re-recorded by SAW-produced girl group Delage in 1991, although their rendition was not released until 1997.

== Critical reception ==
Professional ratings
Review scores
Source	Rating
AllMusic	2/5 stars
Chicago Sun-Times	3/4 stars
Chicago Tribune	2.5/4 stars
Entertainment Weekly	A
NME	4/10
Number One	4/5 stars
Q	3/5 stars
The Rolling Stone Album Guide	2/5 stars
Select	3/5
Smash Hits	4/10
Stylus Magazine	D

In a rave review for Entertainment Weekly, Chuck Eddy said that Pop Life, "while energetic, is far moodier than anything they've ever done. The Gipsy Kings ... help engineer the Doobie Brothers' 'Long Train Running' into a scary locomotive blues. Other tracks venture deep into the dark tunnel of dreamland: Pulses from an alternate universe underline fizzy computerized harmonies; sleepy voices trying hard to wake up ask 'What color are the skies where you live?' ... Two other songs even have heavy psychedelic guitars. We usually visit Bananaramaland to escape our problems, but this album takes us to an eerier place than we'd ever expect." Number One's Tim Green called Pop Life "a well-tuned album of respectable pop tunelets", while in Melody Maker, Caroline Sullivan wrote that Bananarama, after "years of service on perky SAW anthems", had "acquired a new and altogether haunting timbre" and produced "their best album" to date.

Other critics were less enthusiastic. NME reviewer Simon Williams found Pop Life lacking in standout songs despite its "contemporary touches and 'now' club beats", calling it "proof ... that being a slave to the current rhythm means selling yourself short every time." Kirsty McNeill of Smash Hits felt that Bananarama had failed to progress musically, and dismissed the record as "more of the same, familiar, squeaky-voiced harmonies over that ever-present, pounding '80's 'disco' beat." To Charles Merwin from Stylus Magazine, the album was "so dismal that even the Gypsy Kings were embarrassed of their work on it, taking on a pseudonym", and added that "aside from the glorious "Tripping on Your Love" it contains few successful experiments".

== Chart performance ==
Commercially, Pop Life reached number 42 in the United Kingdom, number 37 in Sweden, and number 146 in Australia. Four mid-charting singles were issued from the album, and following the release of "Tripping on Your Love", Jacquie O'Sullivan left the group, leaving Sara Dallin and Keren Woodward to continue as a duo.

== Track listing ==
All tracks are written by Sara Dallin, Jacquie O'Sullivan, Keren Woodward, Youth and Andy Caine, except where noted.

No.	Title	Writer(s)	Length
1.	"Preacher Man"	Andy Caine, Sara Dallin, Youth	3:15
2.	"Long Train Running"	Tom Johnston	3:31
3.	"Only Your Love"		3:58
4.	"What Colour R the Skies Where U Live?"		4:27
5.	"Is Your Love Strong Enough"	Sara Dallin, Steve Jolley	5:07
6.	"Tripping on Your Love"	Sara Dallin, Keren Woodward, Youth, Andy Caine, Danny Schogger	3:20
7.	"Ain't No Cure" (Produced by Stock Aitken Waterman)	Mike Stock, Matt Aitken, Pete Waterman	3:27
8.	"Outta Sight"	Andy Caine, Sara Dallin, Youth	4:31
9.	"Megalomaniac"	Sara Dallin, Bassey Walker, Youth, Andy Caine	6:16
10.	"I Can't Let You Go"		6:10
Total length:			44:02

CD bonus track
No.	Title	Writer(s)	Length
11.	"Heartless"	Mike Stock, Matt Aitken, Pete Waterman, Sara Dallin, Keren Woodward	3:22
Total length:			47:24

Original 1991 CD bonus track
No.	Title	Writer(s)	Length
12.	"Preacher Man" (Ramabanana Alternative Mix)	Andy Caine, Sara Dallin, Youth	7:31
Total length:			54:55

2007 CD re-issue bonus tracks
No.	Title	Writer(s)	Length
12.	"Only Your Love" (7-inch mix)		4:02
13.	"Preacher Man" (alternative 7-inch mix)	Andy Caine, Sara Dallin, Youth	3:39
14.	"Megalomaniac" (edit)	Sara Dallin, Bassey Walker, Youth, Andy Caine	4:43
15.	"Tripping on Your Love" (single mix)	Andy Caine, Danny Schogger, Keren Woodward, Sara Dallin, Youth	3:15
16.	"What Colour R the Skies Where U Live?" (J-Jagged Mix) (Previously Unreleased)		6:24
17.	"Ain't No Cure" (alternative version; previously unreleased; produced by Youth)	Mike Stock, Matt Aitken, Pete Waterman	4:03

=== 2013 deluxe edition 2CD/DVD re-issue ===
Disc 1 bonus tracks
No.	Title	Writer(s)	Length
12.	"I Don't Care" (previously unreleased)	Mike Stock, Matt Aitken, Pete Waterman, Sara Dallin, Keren Woodward	6:16
13.	"Some Boys" (previously unreleased)	Unknown	5:33
14.	"Only Your Love" (Milky Bar Mix)		8:11
15.	"Tripping on Your Love" (Dance Floor Justice Mix)	Andy Caine, Danny Schogger, Keren Woodward, Sara Dallin, Youth	6:10
16.	"Preacher Man" (original 12" mix; previously unreleased)	Andy Caine, Sara Dallin, Youth	6:08

Disc 2
No.	Title	Writer(s)	Length
1.	"Only Your Love" (Monkey Drum Mooch)		7:33
2.	"Preacher Man" (Ramabanana Alternative Mix)	Andy Caine, Sara Dallin, Youth	7:31
3.	"Long Train Running" (Alma De Noche Version)	Tom Johnston	6:39
4.	"Tripping on Your Love" (Euro Trance Mix)	Andy Caine, Danny Schogger, Keren Woodward, Sara Dallin, Youth	7:20
5.	"Ain't No Cure" (alternative version; produced by Youth)	Mike Stock, Matt Aitken, Pete Waterman	4:06
6.	"What Colour R the Skies Where U Live?" (Paco's Revenge Mix; full mix previously unreleased)		6:55
7.	"Tripping on Your Love" (Smoove Mix; originally on US promo)	Andy Caine, Danny Schogger, Keren Woodward, Sara Dallin, Youth	7:07
8.	"I Don't Care" (Tony King Remix; previously unreleased)	Mike Stock, Matt Aitken, Pete Waterman, Sara Dallin, Keren Woodward	6:10
9.	"Ain't No Cure" (original 12" mix; previously unreleased; produced by Stock Aitken Waterman)	Sara Dallin, Stock, Aitken & Waterman	7:02
10.	"Tripping on Your Love" (Silky 70s Mix)	Andy Caine, Danny Schogger, Keren Woodward, Sara Dallin, Youth	6:26
11.	"Long Train Running" (Sparky's Magic Button Mix; originally on UK promo)	Tom Johnston	4:34
12.	"Tripping on Your Love" (Sweet Exorcist Remix; originally on promo)	Andy Caine, Danny Schogger, Keren Woodward, Sara Dallin, Youth	8:12

DVD
No.	Title	Director	Length
1.	"Only Your Love" (music video)	Philippe Gautier
2.	"Preacher Man" (music video)
3.	"Long Train Running" (music video)
4.	"Tripping on Your Love" (music video)
5.	"Only Your Love" (on Wogan)	Sylvie Boden
6.	"Preacher Man" (on Top of the Pops)

2018 collector's edition
No.	Title	Writer(s)	Length
12.	"Only Your Love" (Milky Bar Mix)		8:11
13.	"Preacher Man" (Shep's Club Mix)	Andy Caine, Sara Dallin, Youth	7:21
14.	"Long Train Running" (Alma De Noche Mix / Version)	Tom Johnston	6:39
15.	"Tripping on Your Love" (Euro Trance Mix)	Andy Caine, Danny Schogger, Keren Woodward, Sara Dallin, Youth	7:20

== Personnel ==
Bananarama

- Sara Dallin – vocals
- Jacquie O'Sullivan – vocals
- Keren Woodward – vocals

Additional personnel

- Youth – bass, keyboards, drum programming
- Crispin "Spry" Robinson – percussion
- Johnny Mars – harmonica
- Nigel Butler – additional keyboards
- Paul Cooke – additional drums
- Andy Caine – guitar and bass on "Long Train Running"
- Alma De Noche (Gipsy Kings) – voice and flamenco guitar on "Long Train Running"
- Guy Pratt – additional keyboards on "Long Train Running"
- Danny Schogger – additional keyboards on "Long Train Running" and "Tripping on Your Love"
- Zoë – backing vocals on "Long Train Running"
- Carol Kenyon – backing vocals on "Long Train Running"
- Robin Goodfellow – bass on "Is Your Love Strong Enough"
- Paul Inder – bass on "Outta Sight"
- Linda Taylor – additional backing vocals on "Preacher Man", "Only Your Love", "What Colour R the Skies Where U Live?" and "I Can't Let You Go"

Technical

- Shep Pettibone – additional production and remix on "Preacher Man"
- Robin Goodfellow – engineer
- Ellen Von Unwerth – photography

== Charts ==
Chart (1991)	Peak position
Australian Albums (ARIA)	146
European Albums (Music & Media)	81
Finnish Albums (Suomen virallinen lista)	8
French Albums (IFOP)	43
Japanese Albums (Oricon)	53
Swedish Albums (Sverigetopplistan)	37
UK Albums (Official Charts)	42
