= Love in the First Degree (Bananarama song) =

Single by Bananarama

from the album Wow!
- B-side: "Mr. Sleaze"
- Released: 21 September 1987
- Recorded: March 1987
- Genre: Dance-pop; synth-pop
- Length: 3:33
- Label: London
- Songwriters: Sara Dallin; Siobhan Fahey; Keren Woodward; Mike Stock; Matt Aitken; Pete Waterman
- Producer: Stock Aitken Waterman

Bananarama singles chronology
"I Heard a Rumour" (1987)	"Love in the First Degree" (1987)	"I Can't Help It" (1987)

Music video
- "Love in the First Degree" on YouTube

Professional ratings
Review scores
Source	Rating
Number One	3/5 stars

"Love in the First Degree" is a song by the English girl group Bananarama from their fourth studio album, Wow! (1987). It was released on 21 September 1987 as the album's second single, except in the United States, where it was released in 1988 as the third single (following "I Can't Help It"). The track was co-written and produced by the Stock Aitken Waterman (SAW) trio. It achieved major success in the UK and Australia, and also peaked within the top 20 in many European countries, but, unlike "I Heard a Rumour", it reached only the lower end of the top 50 in the US.

== Writing and release ==
"Love in the First Degree" is an uptempo pop tune similar to many hits produced by SAW during this era. The lyric, composed by Siobhan Fahey and built upon by SAW and Bananarama members Sara Dallin and Keren Woodward, describes a dream in which they find themselves being tried in court for love. The musical structure could be compared to Pachelbel's Canon.

Producer Pete Waterman variously claimed he came up with the idea for the song while in the bath, and after waking up one morning with the tune in his head;. However, Dallin has stated he was not present during the song's composition. Waterman further claimed he had to threaten to pull SAW off the Wow! project in order to force the release of the track as a single, after it was dismissed by the band and label as too commercial.

The record sleeves for "Love in the First Degree" and "I Can't Help It", were switched with each other, for UK, and North American markets. As one of their final performances with Fahey, the group performed the song at the 1988 Brit Awards with a large entourage of male dancers dressed only in black briefs. By the time "Love in the First Degree" was released in the United States, Fahey had already announced her departure from Bananarama.

== Music video ==
The music video for "Love in the First Degree", directed by Andy Morahan, features the group performing the song in a jail cell, alternately dressed in black outfits and prison uniforms. Several male dancers perform around them. The imagery plays off of Elvis Presley's 1957 film Jailhouse Rock. Fahey was pregnant with her first child at the time of filming. Sections of the video featuring acrobatics used body doubles. On Bananarama's The Greatest Hits Collection video compilation, the music video for "Love in the First Degree" is intercut with the live performance of the song at the 1988 Brit Awards, which was Fahey's last performance with the group.

== Critical reception ==
=== Initial response ===
Paul Simper of Number One stated that "Love in the First Degree" "simply continues to send their high-camp disco train whistling down the track". A review in Pan-European magazine Music & Media deemed the song a "bouncy, cheerful disco". In Smash Hits, Pat Kane of pop duo Hue and Cry compared Stock, Aitken and Waterman to estate agents and added that "this record is as excitin' as three estate agents on holiday in Luton". The song was nominated for British Single of the Year at that year's Brit Awards, but lost to Rick Astley's "Never Gonna Give You Up", also produced by Stock Aitken Waterman.

=== Impact and legacy ===
Retrospectively, in 2021, British magazine Classic Pop ranked it number five in their list of "Top 40 Stock Aitken Waterman songs", deeming the song "a paragon of glossy pop perfection". In 2023, Alexis Petridis of The Guardian listed the song at number 5 in his "Stock Aitken Waterman's 20 greatest songs – ranked!", adding that it "was magnificent, a song that earned the public approval of Motown boss Berry Gordy". The same year, Tom Eames of Smooth Radio ranked the song at number four in his "Bananarama's 10 greatest songs, ranked" list, adding that it was "inspired by the Motown sound of the early '60s and the Elvis Presley movie Jailhouse Rock".

== Chart performance ==
"Love in the First Degree" was the most successful single from the Wow! album. It entered the UK Singles Chart at number 46 on 10 October 1987, reached the top five two weeks later and peaked at number three, tying with "Robert De Niro's Waiting..." (1984) and "Help!" (1989) as Bananarama's highest-charting single in the UK; On the 24 October 1987 chart, the B-Side "Mr. Sleaze" was added to the listing, making it a double-sided hit. On 28 November 1987, while at #16, the record flipped and "Mr. Sleaze" was listed first. It spent 12 weeks on the chart, which was also the second longest chart run for one of their single in the country, only beaten by "Venus". It received a silver disc awarded by the British Phonographic Industry, ranked at number 32 on the national year-end chart, and was a hit in clubs, culminating at number two on the Dance chart established by Music Week.

In the rest of Europe, it was also a top ten hit in other three nations, attaining number six in Ireland with a seven-week charting, number nine in the Flanders region of Belgium, and number ten in Norway. In addition, it peaked at number 12 in Spain and the Netherlands, number 15 in Finland and Sweden, and number 18 in Switzerland. The only European country where it missed the top 20 is Germany, where it started at number 26 on 30 November 1987 but was unable to go beyond number 21, a position it reached three week later, out of a 10-week chart run. On the Pan-Eurochart Hot 100 singles chart compiled by the Music & Media magazine, it debuted at number 69 on 24 October 1987 and culminated at number nine in its seven week; it also charted for 11 weeks on the European Airplay Top 50, with a peak at number six in its sixth week.

Outside Europe, "Love in the First Degree" attained number ten in South Africa. In Oceanian countries and North America, it charted in the first months of 1988, peaking at number five in Australia and number 11 in New Zealand, a position it held twice. In the US, it made the top 50 on the Billboard Hot 100, reaching number 48 in its sixth week with a ten-week chart trajectory, and number 10 on Billboard's Hot Dance Club Play chart on which it appeared for eight weeks.

== Track listings ==
- 7-inch single
1. "Love in the First Degree" (Album Version) – 3:33
2. "Mr. Sleaze" – 4:45
- UK 12-inch single
1. "Love in the First Degree" (Jailer's Mix) – 6:03
  Available on the CD album "The Greatest Remixes Collection".
2. "Love in the First Degree" (Escapee Instrumental) – 3:33
3. "Mr. Sleaze" (Single Version) – 4:45
- 2nd 12-inch single / German 12-inch single
1. "Love in the First Degree" (Eurobeat Style) – 7:15
  Available on the CD album "Greatest Hits Collection".
2. "Mr. Sleaze" (Rare Groove Mix) – 6:00
- US 12-inch single
1. "Love in the First Degree" (Eurobeat Style) – 7:15
2. "Love in the First Degree" (7" Mix) – 3:33
3. "Love in the First Degree" (Jailer's Mix) – 6:03
4. "Ecstacy" (Wild Style) – 5:35

=== Other versions ===
1. "Love in the First Degree" (House Mix / House Mix Edit) – 5:45
  Available on the CD single "I Want You Back".
2. "Love in the First Degree" (Love In The House Mix / Full House Mix) – 8:35
  Available on the CD album Wow (2013 deluxe edition 2CD/DVD re-issue)
3. "Love in the First Degree" (House Dub) – 4:57
  Available on the CD Compilation Megarama - The Mixes
4. "Love in the First Degree" (Jailer's Mix With Intro) – 6:15
  Available on the CD album Wow (2013 deluxe edition 2CD/DVD re-issue)

== Personnel ==
Bananarama

- Sara Dallin – vocals
- Siobhan Fahey – vocals
- Keren Woodward – vocals

== Charts ==
=== Weekly charts ===
Weekly chart performance for "Love in the First Degree"
Chart (1987–1988)	Peak position
Australia (Australian Music Report)	5
Belgium (Ultratop 50 Flanders)	9
Europe (European Hot 100 Singles)	9
Europe (European Airplay Top 50)	6
Finland (Suomen virallinen lista)	15
Ireland (IRMA)	6
Israel (IBA)	6
Italy Airplay (Music & Media)	5
Luxembourg (Radio Luxembourg)	2
Netherlands (Dutch Top 40)	13
Netherlands (Single Top 100)	12
New Zealand (Recorded Music NZ)	11
Norway (VG-lista)	10
Quebec (ADISQ)	30
South Africa (Springbok Radio)	10
Spain (AFYVE)	12
Sweden (Sverigetopplistan)	15
Switzerland (Schweizer Hitparade)	18
UK Singles (Official Charts)	3
UK Dance (Music Week)	2
US Billboard Hot 100	48
US Dance Club Songs (Billboard) with "Ecstacy"	10
US Dance Singles Sales (Billboard) with "Ecstacy"	27
US Cash Box Top 100	48
West Germany (GfK)	21

=== Year-end charts ===
1987 year-end chart performance for "Love in the First Degree"
Chart (1987)	Position
Belgium (Ultratop 50 Flanders)	100
UK Singles (Gallup)	32

1988 year-end chart performance for "Love in the First Degree"
Chart (1988)	Position
Australia (ARIA)	24

== Certifications ==
Certifications for "Love in the First Degree"
Region	Certification	Certified units/sales
United Kingdom (BPI)	Silver	250,000^{^}
^{^} Shipments figures based on certification alone.
