= Love, Truth and Honesty =

Single by Bananarama

from the album The Greatest Hits Collection
- B-side: "Strike It Rich"
- Released: 12 September 1988
- Recorded: April 1988
- Genre: Dance-pop
- Length: 3:25
- Label: London
- Songwriters: Sara Dallin; Keren Woodward; Jacquie O'Sullivan; Mike Stock; Matt Aitken; Pete Waterman
- Producer: Stock Aitken Waterman

Bananarama singles chronology
"I Want You Back" (1988)	"Love, Truth and Honesty" (1988)	"Nathan Jones" (1988)

Music video
- "Love, Truth and Honesty" on YouTube

"Love, Truth and Honesty" is a song by the English girl group Bananarama from their first greatest hits album, Greatest Hits Collection (1988). Co-written and produced by the Stock Aitken Waterman (SAW) trio, the song was released on 12 September 1988 by London Records as the album's lead single. It achieved a moderate success, peaking out of the top 20 in the majority of countries where it was released. The music video was produced by Big TV!.

== Background and writing ==
"Love, Truth and Honesty" is Bananarama's only single to give a songwriting credit to new member Jacquie O'Sullivan, and was also the last single Bananarama would write with SAW as a trio. Speaking of the subject matter of the song, Keren Woodward noted, "The single’s more bitter than it appears on the surface. It's not 'Hey! Love, Truth and Honesty!' It’s what a fool I was to believe in love truth and honesty.”

== Critical reception ==
=== Reviews ===
Jonh Wilde from Melody Maker wrote, "Another blithely cheerful nursery-rhyme that will get housewives rattling their J-cloths all over the home counties, flicking the dust-beetles under the rugs as they whistle along, "Never trust your emotions, they'll always let you down", they yodel." Jack Barron from NME said, "A tale of betrayal, 'Love Truth and Honesty' doesn't bleat about the bush but blushes with a tacky SAW electrodance beat and purple prose passion. Prime pop delivered in a screw-top." James Hamilton from Record Mirror was critical of the song, describing it as a "surprisingly dull and uninspired Stock Aiken Waterman produced blandly lolloping 116 1/3 bpm canterer with the girls's usual unison vocal patterns and typically nagging hook". Similarly, in another issue of the same magazine, David Gilles called it a "lesser song", adding "it's about time they [Bananarama's members] broke away from SAW". By contrast, in 2017, Christian Guiltenane of British magazine Attitude praised this Bananarama song as being "one of their more glum affairs (though still wrapped up in a tinny SAW package), but is sensational nevertheless".

=== Impact and legacy ===
In 2021, British magazine Classic Pop ranked it number 15 in their list of "Top 40 Stock Aitken Waterman songs", describing it as a "bleak yet lovable ode to the nasty business of love cheats" and as being "charming, simple, honest". In 2023, Tom Eames of Smooth Radio ranked the song at number nine in his "Bananarama's 10 greatest songs, ranked" list.

== Chart performance ==
"Love, Truth and Honesty" was not as successful as Bananarama's previous singles from the Wow! album. In the UK, it entered the chart at number 31 on 24 September 1988, peaked at number 23 for consecutive two weeks and fell off the chart after eight weeks of presence. The only country where it peaked within the top ten is Finland where it topped the chart, while it was a top 20 hit in Ireland where it attained number 12 with four weeks of charting, and New Zealand where it peaked at number 20 and appeared on the chart for five weeks. In addition, it reached number 25 in Switzerland, missed the top 30 in Australia and the top 40 in West Germany by two places in each case, and barely made the top 100 in the Netherlands. In the United States, "Love, Truth and Honesty" peaked at number 89 on the Billboard Hot 100 and charted for three weeks, marking the group's last appearance on the chart, but did better on the Dance Club Songs chart, peaking at number 26 in its fourth week out of a seven chart run. On the European Hot 100 singles chart compiled by Pan-European magazine Music & Media, it ranked for eight weeks, with a peak at number 41 twice, in its fourth and fifth weeks.

== Music video ==
The accompanying music video for "Love, Truth and Honesty", directed by Big TV!, features the trio performing in front of mirrors and neon lights as a well-groomed man looks on. The three members of the band are shown alternately in evening gowns—a departure from their previous looks—as well as more casual black outfits.

== Track listings ==
- 7-inch single
1. "Love, Truth and Honesty" – 3:25
2. "Strike It Rich" – 5:03
- 12-inch single
1. "Love, Truth and Honesty" (Dance Hall Version) – 7:20
2. "Strike It Rich" (Full Length Club Mix) – 5:55
- 12-inch single (The Remixes)
1. "Love, Truth and Honesty" (Balearacidic Mix) – 8:20
2. "Love, Truth and Honesty" (Hot Power 12″) – 9:15
3. "Strike It Rich" – 2:15
- US 12-inch single
1. "Love, Truth and Honesty" (Hot Power Mix) – 9:24
2. "Love, Truth and Honesty" (Hot Power Edit) – 3:30
3. "Love, Truth and Honesty" (Dance Hall Version) – 7:20
4. "Strike It Rich" (Full Length Club Mix) – 5:58
- UK and German CD maxi single
1. "Love, Truth and Honesty" (Dance Hall Version) – 7:25
2. "Strike It Rich" (Full Length Club Mix) – 5:17
3. "I Want You Back" – 3:49
4. "Love, Truth and Honesty" – 3:25

== Charts ==
Weekly chart performance for "Love, Truth and Honesty"
Chart (1988)	Peak position
Australia (ARIA)	32
Denmark (Hitlisten)	15
Europe (European Hot 100 Singles)	41
Finland (Suomen virallinen lista)	1
Ireland (IRMA)	12
Netherlands (Single Top 100)	87
Luxembourg (Radio Luxembourg)	17
New Zealand (Recorded Music NZ)	20
Quebec (ADISQ)	47
Spain (PROMUSICAE)	13
Switzerland (Schweizer Hitparade)	25
UK Singles (OCC)	23
UK Dance (Music Week)	21
US Billboard Hot 100	89
US Dance Club Songs (Billboard)	26
US Cash Box Top 100	72
West Germany (GfK)	42
