= Only Your Love =

1990 single by Bananarama

Single by Bananarama

from the album Pop Life
- Released: 16 July 1990
- Length: 3:58 (album version); 4:02 (7-inch mix)
- Label: London
- Songwriters: Sara Dallin; Andy Caine; Youth
- Producer: Youth

Bananarama singles chronology
| "Megarama '89" (1989) | "Only Your Love" (1990) | "Preacher Man" (1990) |

Music video
- "Only Your Love" on YouTube

"Only Your Love" is a song by the English girl group Bananarama, released as the first single from the group's fifth studio album, Pop Life (1991). The song was issued ten months prior to the release of the album. The Pop Life album marked Bananarama's break from their relationship with the Stock Aitken Waterman (SAW) production trio. "Only Your Love" was co-written and produced by Youth. The album version of the song was remixed for its single release.

The song's primary rhythm, complete with "woo woo" hoots, directly references "Sympathy for the Devil". This led Jonathan Ross to jokingly thank The Rolling Stones after Bananarama had performed the song on his TV show. The song also contains samples of "Loaded" by Primal Scream, "Fool's Gold" by The Stone Roses, and “Funky Drummer” by James Brown. Upon its release "Only Your Love" received positive critical reviews. The song was not released as a single in the United States.

"Only Your Love" peaked at number 27 on the UK Singles Chart, which the group considered to be a disappointment. Other than Finland, the single did not fare much better in other countries, hitting number 49 in New Zealand (where it was their final chart entry) and 51 in Australia.

== Critical reception ==
Mandi James from NME wrote, "'Only Your Love' could be any of the Nana's other singles seeing as they have the vocal capacity of a stretched elastic band, except in all their postmodern glory they've half-inched the funky drummer break from 'Fool's Gold', bastardises the 'oooh, oooh' from 'Sympathy for the Devil' and created a monster. Tacky, trashy and fun, fun, fun." Another NME editor, Simon Williams, noted its "dancefloor hipness".

== Music video ==
The accompanying music video for "Only Your Love", directed by Philippe Gautier, features the girls on a studio set made to look like a cross between a train and a jungle gym, and uses silhouettes against multicoloured backdrops. They perform the song while dancing provocatively with various male dancers. The dancing features more physical contact between the girls and the male dancers than any of their other videos. The performance on the train is interspersed with shots of the girls singing on the front of the train engine in sunglasses and oversized dresses.

== Track listing ==
- CD 1 single
1. "Only Your Love" (Milky Bar mix) – 8:12
  Remixed by Robin Goodfellow
2. "Only Your Love" (Youth & Thrash on the Mix) – 4:17
3. "Only Your Love" (Hardcore instrumental) – 3:27
- CD 2 single
1. "Only Your Love" (7" mix) – 4:02
2. "Only Your Love" (Milky Bar mix) – 8:12
  Remixed by Robin Goodfellow
3. "Only Your Love" (Hardcore instrumental) – 3:27
4. "Only Your Love" (Youth & Thrash on the Mix) – 4:17
- CD 3 single
1. "Only Your Love" (Milky Bar mix) – 8:12
  Remixed by Robin Goodfellow
2. "Only Your Love" (Hardcore instrumental) – 3:27
3. "Only Your Love" (Youth & Thrash on the Mix) – 4:17
4. "Only Your Love" (Paris Texas instrumental) – 5:33
- Other versions
1. "Only Your Love" (album version) – 3:58
2. "Only Your Love" (instrumental)
3. "Only Your Love" (The Monkey Drum Mooch) – 7:20
  Remixed by Terry Farley
4. "Only Your Love" (A Tribute to Barry Mooncult mix) – 5:40
  Remixed by Terry Farley
5. "Only Your Love" (Initial Talk remix) – 6:08
  Remixed by Initial Talk, available on 3CD version of Glorious: The Ultimate Collection

== Charts ==
Weekly chart performance for "Only Your Love"
| Chart (1990) | Peak position |
|---|---|
| Australia (ARIA) | 51 |
| Europe (Eurochart Hot 100 Singles) | 73 |
| Finland (Suomen virallinen lista) | 5 |
| Italy (Musica e dischi) | 21 |
| New Zealand (Recorded Music NZ) | 49 |
| UK Singles (Official Charts) | 27 |

== Release history ==
Release dates and formats for "Only Your Love"
| Region | Date | Format(s) | Label(s) | Ref(s). |
|---|---|---|---|---|
| United Kingdom | 16 July 1990 | 7-inch vinyl; 12-inch vinyl; CD; cassette | London | |
| Japan | 25 August 1990 | Mini-CD; maxi-CD | London | |
| Australia | 24 September 1990 | 7-inch vinyl; 12-inch vinyl; CD; cassette | London | |
