= I Heard a Rumour =

1987 single by Bananarama

Single by Bananarama

from the album Wow!
- B-side: "Clean Cut Boy"
- Released: 22 June 1987
- Genre: Synth-pop; dance-pop; hi-NRG
- Length: 3:25
- Label: London
- Songwriters: Sara Dallin; Siobhan Fahey; Keren Woodward; Mike Stock; Matt Aitken; Pete Waterman
- Producer: Stock Aitken Waterman

Bananarama singles chronology
"A Trick of the Night" (1987)	"I Heard a Rumour" (1987)	"Love in the First Degree" (1987)

Music video
- "I Heard a Rumour" on YouTube

"I Heard a Rumour" is a song by the English girl group Bananarama from their fourth studio album, Wow! (1987), and was released on 22 June 1987 as the album's lead single. It charted at number 14 in the United Kingdom and entered the top 10 in several other countries, including Canada and the United States, where it became a top-five hit.

== Background and writing ==
"I Heard a Rumour" bears notable similarities in part to Michael Fortunati's "Give Me Up", which was released in early 1986; however, producer Mike Stock denied the track was based excessively on that record, insisting the track was simply broadly inspired by Europop trends at the time, saying: "We didn't do sampling... There's no similarity in the lyric, there's no actual similarity in terms of note-for-noteness in the tune," he said. "We were doing Europop." The song also uses the synth riff from another of SAW's hits, "Nothing's Gonna Stop Me Now" by Samantha Fox.

== Music video ==
The music video, directed by Andy Morahan, features a dress-up theme, in a similar vein as their video for "Venus". Group members Sara Dallin, Siobhan Fahey, and Keren Woodward are seen emulating various film stars, projected on screens behind them. One scene projected is vaudeville performers the Dodge Twins dressed in striped jail costumes performing the Lock Step. Each member dresses up in costumes, including a cowgirl and Carmen Miranda, backed up by topless male dancers. When the group is dressed in French can-can dresses, they bend over to "moon" the camera and expose the letters W-O-W (a reference to their album title) on their rears. They also appear in sequined red dresses on a rotating platform, surrounded by their dancers. Bloopers of the girls making mistakes in the dance routine are intercut with other footage.

== Critical reception ==
=== Initial response ===
Jerry Smith of British magazine Music Week described "I Heard a Rumour" a "bright and breezy summer hit". By contrast, Robin Smith of Record Mirror criticized it for displaying what he called a "cutesy approach" and being a song which, in his point of view, could have been recorded "by Mandy Smith or any other starlet who's just signed a record deal".

=== Impact and legacy ===
Retrospectively, in 2021, British magazine Classic Pop ranked the song number 10 in their list of 'Top 40 Stock Aitken Waterman songs'. In 2023, Alexis Petridis of The Guardian listed the song at number 11 in his "Stock Aitken Waterman's 20 greatest songs – ranked!" The same year, Tom Eames of Smooth Radio ranked the song at number five in his "Bananarama's 10 greatest songs, ranked" list.

== Chart performance ==
In the UK, "I Heard a Rumour" entered the UK Singles Chart at number 55 on 11 July 1987, peaked at number 14 three weeks later, and charted for a total of nine weeks. It managed to peak inside the top ten in other four European territories: Ireland where it charted for five weeks, Finland, Sweden and Switzerland, reaching number nine in the first country and number ten in the others. It was a top 20 hit in the Netherlands where it culminated at number 16, and a top 30 hit in Italy and the Flanders region of Belgium where it rose until number 25 and 27, respectively. Its worst peak position was in Germany where it debuted at number 52 on 27 July 1987, climbed every week and stopped at number 37 in its sixth week, staying for 14 weeks on the chart. On the Pan-Eurochart Hot 100 singles chart compiled by Music & Media, it had a 12-week chart run with a peak at number 11 in its fifth week, while it appeared for ten weeks, the half of them spent in the top ten, on the European Airplay Top 50 and peaked at number seven.

Outside Europe, "I Heard a Rumour" was particularly successful in North America. In Canada, it peaked at number two and ranked at number 30 on the year-end chart of the country. It was one of Bananarama's highest-charting singles in the US, peaking at number four with a 19-week chart run on the Billboard Hot 100, thus becoming their third and final top ten hit as well as their last top 40 hit on that chart. It was also successful in nightclubs, reaching number three on the US Billboard Dance Club Songs, with 11 weeks of charting. On these two US charts, it ranked at number 53 and 33 on their respective 1987 year-end charts. In addition, it spent 12 weeks in the last months of 1987 on the New Zealand singles chart, peaking at number eight, reached number 23 in South Africa, and missed the top 30 by two places in Australia.

== Uses in the media ==
"I Heard a Rumour" is used in the comedy film Disorderlies, also released in 1987, and is included on its soundtrack.

== Track listings ==
- 7-inch single
1. "I Heard a Rumour" (Album Version) – 3:25
2. "Clean Cut Boy" (Party Size) – 4:22
  S. Dallin/S. Fahey/K. Woodward/I. Curnow
- 12-inch single
1. "I Heard a Rumour" (Horoscope Mix) – 5:57
  Available on the CD album The Twelve Inches of Bananarama
2. "I Heard a Rumour" (Dub) – 5:06
3. "Clean Cut Boy" (Party Size) – 4:22
  S. Dallin/S. Fahey/K. Woodward/I. Curnow
- 2nd 12-inch single
1. "I Heard a Rumour" (Miami Mix) – 7:13
  Also available for the first time on the CD album The Greatest Remixes Collection and the limited edition 2-cd version of The Very Best of Bananarama
  Remixed by Phil Harding
2. "I Heard a Rumour" (House Mix) – 7:22
  Remixed by Phil Harding
3. "Clean Cut Boy" (Party Size) – 4:22
- US 12-inch maxi single and cassette
1. "I Heard a Rumour" (Horoscope Mix) – 5:57
2. "I Heard a Rumour" (Miami Mix) – 7:13
3. "I Heard a Rumour" (House Mix) – 7:22
4. "Clean Cut Boy" (Party Size) – 4:22
- Other versions
1. "I Heard a Rumour" (Corporation Of Bananarama Mix) – 5:40
  From the single "Megarama '89" and "Cruel Summer '89"
  Remixed by Freddie Bastone
2. "I Heard a Rumour" (Corporation Dub)
  Remixed by Freddie Bastone
3. "I Heard a Rumour" (2001 Version)
  Taken from the album Exotica

== Charts ==
=== Weekly charts ===
Weekly chart performance for "I Heard a Rumour"
Chart (1987)	Peak position
Australia (Australian Music Report)	32
Belgium (Ultratop 50 Flanders)	27
Canada Top Singles (RPM)	2
Europe (European Hot 100 Singles)	11
Europe (European Airplay Top 50)	7
Finland (Suomen virallinen lista)	10
Ireland (IRMA)	9
Israel (IBA)	3
Italy (Musica e dischi)	25
Italy Airplay (Music & Media)	9
Luxembourg (Radio Luxembourg)	7
Netherlands (Dutch Top 40)	17
Netherlands (Single Top 100)	16
New Zealand (Recorded Music NZ)	8
Quebec (ADISQ)	3
South Africa (Springbok Radio)	23
Sweden (Sverigetopplistan)	10
Switzerland (Schweizer Hitparade)	10
UK Singles (Official Charts)	14
UK Dance (Music Week)	36
US Billboard Hot 100	4
US Adult Contemporary (Billboard)	32
US Dance Club Songs (Billboard)	3
US Dance Singles Sales (Billboard)	7
US Cash Box Top 100 Singles	4
West Germany (GfK)	37

=== Year-end charts ===
Year-end chart performance for "I Heard a Rumour"
Chart (1987)	Position
Canada Top Singles (RPM)	30
US Billboard Hot 100	53
US Dance Club Play (Billboard)	33
US Cash Box Top 100 Singles	45

== Cover version ==
The song was covered in Japanese by singer Tomoko Mayumi in 1987.
