= I Want You Back (Bananarama song) =

Single by Bananarama

from the album Wow!
- B-side: "Bad for Me"
- Released: 28 March 1988
- Recorded: April 1987 (album version); 1988 (single version)
- Genre: Dance-pop
- Length: 3:53
- Label: London
- Songwriters: Sara Dallin; Siobhan Fahey; Keren Woodward; Mike Stock; Matt Aitken; Pete Waterman
- Producer: Stock Aitken Waterman

Bananarama singles chronology
"I Can't Help It" (1987)	"I Want You Back" (1988)	"Love, Truth and Honesty" (1988)

Music video
- "I Want You Back" on YouTube

"I Want You Back" is a song by the English girl group Bananarama from their fourth studio album, Wow! (1987). It was released on 28 March 1988 by London Records as the album's fourth and final single. The track was co-written and produced by the Stock Aitken Waterman (SAW) trio. It became one of Bananarama's highest-charting singles, peaking at number five on the UK Singles Chart. It also climbed into the top three in Australia and the top 10 in New Zealand. The single was not released in the United States. Andy Morahan directed its accompanying music video.

== Background and writing ==
The song was initially titled "Reason for Living" and had a different chorus that Bananarama's members disliked; so they co-rewrote it and the song was retitled "I Want You Back". Both versions were originally recorded with Siobhan Fahey for the 1987 Wow! album. For the April 1988 single release, the song was re-recorded with Jacquie O'Sullivan, who had replaced Fahey in March 1988. "Reason for Living" was included on the deluxe version of Wow!, which was released in 2013. Elements of the original chorus can be heard in both the original Wow! version of "I Want You Back" and in the Extended European Mix of the 1988 single release.

== Critical reception ==
=== Initial response ===
A reviewer from Melody Maker wrote that the song is "quite the worst thing they have done for a couple of years." Neil Taylor from NME commented, "England's most successful female trio strut out their stuff aided and abetted by SAW. This single gets trapped in its own simplicity. Simplicity made these girls and whilst the lyrics here is suitably lightweight, the song has too many complicated musical twists and turns. In Bananarama's market, songs are neither here nor there and only stars count. This has got the stars, it just lacks the usual jazzy stripes." James Hamilton from Record Mirror said in his dance column, "Breezily jaunty (what else!) 123 1/2bpm thudding pop chugger with the girls' usual shrill trademarks". Betty Page of the same magazine stated that "I Want You Back" is "another SAW Hit Factory production, [although] this seems not as immediate as "I Can't Help It" but even after one play it feels like you've been humming it for days". In a review published in Smash Hits, English synth-pop duo Erasure were highly critical of the song, saying it was "terrible" and "pretty bad"; Andy Bell added: "I'd be really ashamed if I was releasing singles like this", considered that SAW were only making songs for money and that "it's a really shame how Bananarama have gone".

=== Impact and legacy ===
Retrospectively, in 2014, Matt Dunn of WhatCulture ranked the song at number 10 in his "15 unforgettable Stock Aitken Waterman singles" list. In 2021, Classic Pop ranked "I Want You Back" number 29 in their list of "Top 40 Stock Aitken Waterman songs". In 2023, Tom Eames of Smooth Radio ranked the song at number seven in his "Bananarama's 10 greatest songs, ranked" list, adding that it was a "catchy dance-pop tune" with a music video which includes a parody of the Supremes.

== Chart performance ==
"I Want You Back" was among Bananarama's most successful singles on the worldwide charts. In the UK, it was one of the band's top ten hit (out of ten); it started at number 36 on 9 April 1988, peaked at number five for two consecutive weeks, and fell off the chart after ten weeks, five of them spent in the top ten. It met also with success in Ireland where it reached number three and charted for a total of six weeks, was a top-five hit in Luxembourg, a top-ten hit in Spain where it attained number six, and a top-20 hit in Finland. However, it was a moderate hit in German-speaking countries, culminating at number 23 and 29 in Switzerland and West Germany, respectively, and in Dutch-speaking countries, stalling at numbers 40 and 49 in the Flanders region of Belgium and the Netherlands. On the Music & Media's combined Pan-European Hot 100 singles chart, it debuted at number 45 on 23 April 1988, reached a peak of number 17 in its third week, and cumulated nine weeks of presence on the chart. It also enjoyed decent airplay on radios, thus charted for eight weeks on the European Airplay Top 50, peaking at number eight in its fifth week.

Regarding the Oceanian market, "I Want You Back" was a top ten hit in both Australia and New Zealand. In Australia, it charted in the top 50 for 16 weeks, eight of them spent in the top ten, with number three as its highest position in its sixth week. In New Zealand, it had an eight-week chart run with a start at number 20 on 31 July 1988 and a peak at number ten in its third week.

== Music video ==
The music video for "I Want You Back" featured the group performing the song in various scenarios. One has the three girls performing a choreographed dance routine before the camera. Another has them acting silly, dancing spontaneously, and humorously fighting for screen time. Another scenario features the girls performing their dance routine dressed in silver gowns, wigs and skin darkening makeup as The Supremes. These scenes are interspersed with go-go boys dancing with wigs or in cages clad only in briefs and glow-in-the-dark body paint. An alternative version exists with a scenario of the girls in long wigs replacing the choreographed dance routine scenes. Both videos were directed by Andy Morahan.

== Track listings ==
- 7-inch single (NANA 16)
1. "I Want You Back" (single version) – 3:47
2. "Bad for Me" – 3:37
- 10-inch gatefold single (NANG 16)
1. "I Want You Back" (single version) – 3:47
2. "Bananarama Megamix" (edit) – 6:15
- 12-inch single (NANX 16)
1. "I Want You Back" (extended European version) – 7:56
2. "Amnesia" (extended 12″ version) (theme from The Roxy) – 6:28
  M. Stock/M. Aitken/P. Waterman, :Remixed by Extra Beat Boys
3. "Bad for Me" – 3:37
- CD single (NANCD 16)
1. "I Want You Back" (single version) – 3:47
2. "Bad for Me" – 3:37
3. "Amnesia" (extended 12" version) (Theme from The Roxy) – 6:28
4. "Love in the First Degree" (house remix) – 5:45
  Remixed by Pete Hammond and edited by Phil Harding

Other versions

1. "I Want You Back" (LP version) – 3:53
  Taken from the album Wow!

== Personnel ==
- Sara Dallin – vocals
- Keren Woodward – vocals
- Siobhan Fahey – vocals
- Jacquie O'Sullivan – vocals (single)

== Charts ==
=== Weekly charts ===
Weekly chart performance for "I Want You Back"
Chart (1988)	Peak position
Australia (ARIA)	3
Belgium (Ultratop 50 Flanders)	40
Denmark (Hitlisten)	13
Europe (Eurochart Hot 100 Singles)	17
Europe (European Airplay Top 50)	8
Finland (Suomen virallinen lista)	16
Ireland (IRMA)	3
Israel (Israeli Singles Chart)	9
Luxembourg (Radio Luxembourg)	4
Netherlands (Dutch Top 40 Tipparade)	9
Netherlands (Single Top 100)	49
New Zealand (Recorded Music NZ)	10
Spain (AFYVE)	6
Switzerland (Schweizer Hitparade)	23
UK Singles (Official Charts)	5
UK Dance (Music Week)	8
West Germany (GfK)	29

=== Year-end charts ===
Year-end chart performance for "I Want You Back"
Chart (1988)	Position
Australia (ARIA)	34
UK Singles (Gallup)	63
