= Andy Morahan =

British director (born 1958)

- Born: Andrew Douglas Morahan; 11 August 1958 (age 67); Kensington, London, England
- Occupation: Director
- Years active: 1980–present
- Spouse: Joanna Lewis
- Children: 2
- Father: Christopher Morahan
- Relatives: Hattie Morahan (half-sister)
- Website: andymorahan.com

Andrew Douglas Morahan (born 11 August 1958) is a British commercial, film and music video director. He is the son of director Christopher Morahan and the half-brother of actress Hattie Morahan. Married to Joanna Lewis, he has two children.

== Videography ==
=== Films ===
| Year | Title |
|---|---|
| 1994 | Highlander III: The Sorcerer |
| 1997 | Murder in Mind |
| 2009 | Goal III: Taking on the World |
| 2018 | Boogie Man |
| 2026 | George Michael: The Faith Tour |

=== Music videos ===
==== 1980–1984 ====
| Year | Artist | Title |
|---|---|---|
| 1984 | Wham! | "Wake Me Up Before You Go-Go" |
| 1984 | Wham! | "Everything She Wants" |
| 1984 | Wham! | "Last Christmas" |

| Year | Artist | Song |
|---|---|---|
| 1984 | Kim Wilde | "The Second Time" |

==== 1985–1989 ====
| Year | Artist | Title |
|---|---|---|
| 1985 | Orchestral Manoeuvres in the Dark | "So in Love" |
| 1985 | Pet Shop Boys | "Opportunities (Let's Make Lots of Money)" |
| 1985 | Orchestral Manoeuvres in the Dark | "Secret" |
| 1985 | Lloyd Cole and the Commotions | "Brand New Friend" |
| 1985 | Pet Shop Boys | "West End Girls" |
| 1985 | Wham! | "I'm Your Man" |
| 1985 | David Grant and Jaki Graham | "Mated" |
| 1986 | Ozzy Osbourne | "Shot in the Dark" |
| 1986 | Pet Shop Boys | "Love Comes Quickly" (co-directed by Eric Watson) |
| 1986 | George Michael | "A Different Corner" |
| 1986 | The Blow Monkeys | "Wicked Ways" |
| 1986 | Wham! | "The Edge of Heaven" |
| 1986 | Ozzy Osbourne | "The Ultimate Sin" |
| 1986 | Luther Vandross | "Give Me the Reason" |
| 1986 | The Human League | "Human" |
| 1986 | Wham! | "Where Did Your Heart Go?" (co-directed by George Michael) |
| 1986 | The Human League | "I Need Your Loving" |
| 1986 | The Communards | "So Cold the Night" |
| 1986 | Cyndi Lauper | "Change of Heart" |
| 1986 | Luther Vandross | "Stop to Love" |
| 1987 | The Blow Monkeys | "Out with Her" |
| 1987 | Flesh for Lulu | "I Go Crazy" |
| 1987 | Aretha Franklin and George Michael | "I Knew You Were Waiting (For Me)" |
| 1987 | Simply Red | "The Right Thing" |
| 1987 | Cyndi Lauper | "What's Going On" |
| 1987 | Thompson Twins | "Get That Love" |
| 1987 | George Michael | "I Want Your Sex" |
| 1987 | Tina Turner | "Break Every Rule" |
| 1987 | Cyndi Lauper | "Boy Blue" |
| 1987 | Bananarama | "I Heard a Rumour" |
| 1987 | Then Jerico | "The Motive" |
| 1987 | Johnny Hates Jazz | "I Don't Want to Be a Hero" |
| 1987 | Bananarama | "Love in the First Degree" |
| 1987 | Tina Turner | "Paradise Is Here" |
| 1987 | George Michael | "Faith" |
| 1987 | The Communards | "Never Can Say Goodbye" |
| 1987 | George Michael | "Father Figure" |
| 1987 | Bananarama | "I Can't Help It" |
| 1987 | Bros | "When Will I Be Famous?" |
| 1988 | The Communards | "For a Friend" |
| 1988 | a-ha | "Stay on These Roads" |
| 1988 | Bananarama | "I Want You Back" |
| 1988 | Scritti Politti | "Oh Patti (Don't Feel Sorry for Loverboy)" |
| 1988 | a-ha | "The Blood That Moves the Body" |
| 1988 | George Michael | "Monkey" |
| 1988 | Van Halen | "Finish What Ya Started" |
| 1989 | D-A-D | "Sleeping My Day Away" |
| 1989 | Van Halen | "Feels So Good" |
| 1989 | Spandau Ballet | "Be Free with Your Love" |
| 1989 | Simple Minds | "Mandela Day" |
| 1989 | Simple Minds | "Belfast Child" |
| 1989 | Wang Chung | "Praying to a New God" |
| 1989 | Then Jerico featuring Belinda Carlisle | "What Does It Take" |
| 1989 | Simple Minds | "Kick It In" |
| 1989 | Tina Turner | "Steamy Windows" |
| 1989 | Paul McCartney | "Figure of Eight" |
| 1989 | Tears for Fears featuring Oleta Adams | "Woman in Chains" |
| 1989 | Belinda Carlisle | "La Luna" |

==== 1990–1994 ====
| Year | Artist | Title |
|---|---|---|
| 1990 | Belinda Carlisle | "Summer Rain" |
| 1990 | Tears for Fears | "Advice for the Young at Heart" |
| 1990 | Billy Joel | "The Downeaster 'Alexa'" |
| 1990 | Mariah Carey | "Vision of Love" |
| 1990 | The Human League | "Heart Like a Wheel" |
| 1990 | Elton John | "You Gotta Love Someone" |
| 1990 | Extreme | "Get the Funk Out" |
| 1991 | Bobby McFerrin | "Baby" |
| 1991 | Sheena Easton | "What Comes Naturally" |
| 1991 | Simple Minds | "Let There Be Love" |
| 1991 | Van Halen | "Poundcake" |
| 1991 | Simply Red | "Something Got Me Started" |
| 1991 | Guns N' Roses | "Don't Cry" |
| 1991 | Jody Watley | "I Want You" |
| 1991 | Elton John and George Michael | "Don't Let the Sun Go Down on Me" |
| 1992 | Bryan Adams | "(Everything I Do) I Do It for You" (live) |
| 1992 | Simply Red | "For Your Babies" |
| 1992 | Bryan Adams | "Touch the Hand" (live) |
| 1992 | Guns N' Roses | "Knockin' on Heaven's Door" (live) |
| 1992 | Guns N' Roses | "November Rain" |
| 1992 | Chris Rea | "Nothing to Fear" |
| 1992 | Guns N' Roses | "Yesterdays" |
| 1993 | Paul McCartney | "Hope of Deliverance" |
| 1993 | Guns N' Roses | "Garden of Eden" |
| 1993 | Coverdale•Page | "Pride and Joy" |
| 1993 | Michael Jackson featuring Slash | "Give In to Me" |
| 1993 | Bobby Brown | "That's the Way Love Is" |
| 1993 | Coverdale•Page | "Take Me for a Little While" |
| 1993 | Billy Joel | "The River of Dreams" |
| 1993 | Terence Trent D'Arby featuring Des'ree | "Delicate" |
| 1993 | Bobby Brown featuring Whitney Houston | "Something in Common" |
| 1993 | Babyface | "For the Cool in You" |
| 1993 | Guns N' Roses | "Estranged" |
| 1994 | James | "Honest Joe" |
| 1994 | The Human League | "Tell Me When" |

==== 1995–1999 ====
| Year | Artist | Title |
|---|---|---|
| 1995 | The Human League | "One Man in My Heart" |
| 1995 | Bon Jovi | "This Ain't a Love Song" |
| 1996 | Eddi Reader | "Town Without Pity" |
| 1996 | Vanessa Williams | "Where Do We Go from Here?" |
| 1996 | Lionel Richie | "Ordinary Girl" |
| 1997 | George Michael | "Older" |
| 1997 | Aerosmith | "Hole in My Soul" |
| 1999 | The Pretenders | "Loving You Is All I Know" |
| 1999 | B*Witched | "Jesse Hold On" |

==== 2000–2004 ====
| Year | Artist | Title |
|---|---|---|
| 2000 | AC/DC | "Stiff Upper Lip" |
| 2000 | AC/DC | "Satellite Blues" |
| 2000 | AC/DC | "Safe in New York City" |
| 2000 | Richard Ashcroft | "C'mon People (We're Making It Now)" |
| 2000 | S Club 7 | "Natural" |
| 2000 | S Club 7 | "Never Had a Dream Come True" |
| 2001 | S Club 7 | "Don't Stop Movin'" |
| 2001 | Brian Harvey and The Refugee Crew | "Loving You (Ole Ole Ole)" |
| 2001 | Blue | "All Rise" |
| 2003 | Simply Red | "Fake" |
| 2003 | Sugababes | "Too Lost in You" |
| 2004 | George Michael | "Round Here" |

==== 2005–present ====
| Year | Artist | Title |
|---|---|---|
| 2005 | Geri Halliwell | "Desire" |
| 2007 | Biffy Clyro | "Living Is a Problem Because Everything Dies" |
| 2009 | Biffy Clyro | "The Captain" |
| 2010 | Biffy Clyro | "Many of Horror" |
| 2010 | Meat Loaf | "Los Angeloser" |
| 2010 | Matt Cardle | "When We Collide" |
| 2019 | Bananarama | "Stuff Like That" |
