= Jacquie O'Sullivan =

- Born: Jacqueline Michelle O'Sullivan; 7 August 1960 (age 66); London, England
- Genres: Pop; punk; new wave
- Occupations: Singer; songwriter
- Years active: 1978–present
- Label: AlmaFame
- Formerly of: Shillelagh Sisters; Bananarama; Slippry Feet

Jacquie O'Sullivan (born 7 August 1960) is an English singer and songwriter, best known as a member of the pop group Bananarama from 1988 until 1991, replacing Siobhan Fahey, who left in early 1988. The line-up with O'Sullivan had UK top five hits with "I Want You Back" (1988) and a cover of the Beatles' "Help!" (1989), recorded with comedy duo French and Saunders for the charity Comic Relief. In 1989, O'Sullivan joined the group on their first world tour. Prior to Bananarama, O'Sullivan was the lead singer of the band Shillelagh Sisters.

== Career ==
=== Early years ===
O'Sullivan joined the country/punk/rockabilly group Shillelagh Sisters in early 1983. It was "a sort of a fun band, a kind of trendy band". The band name came about courtesy of their Irish connections. They released their first single "Give Me My Freedom" in April 1984. The band's dissatisfaction with their record label CBS, along with differences between the band members, led to the band's demise in late 1984. O'Sullivan later stated that she felt the records they released "weren't very good".

=== 1988–1991: Breakthrough with Bananarama ===
In March 1988, she was chosen by Sara Dallin and Keren Woodward (who had known O'Sullivan since they were eighteen) to become a member of Bananarama, as a replacement for outgoing member Siobhan Fahey, who also approved of the choice. Bananarama's hit streak continued with the addition of O'Sullivan. They re-recorded the vocals for the songs "I Want You Back" and "Nathan Jones" with O'Sullivan to replace versions previously recorded by Fahey. The group scored eight consecutive top 40 hits in the UK with O'Sullivan.

She appeared on Bananarama's fund-raising cover of the Beatles' "Help!" for Comic Relief alongside comedians French and Saunders and Kathy Burke, who appeared as Lananeeneenoonoo. The record peaked at number three on the UK Singles Chart in 1989. She also participated in Band Aid II's 1989 re-recording of "Do They Know It's Christmas?".

O'Sullivan's only songwriting credit with Bananarama appeared on the song "Love, Truth and Honesty" from the compilation album Greatest Hits Collection.

In 1991, Bananarama recorded the album Pop Life, the only full-length album on which O'Sullivan appeared. Later that year, O'Sullivan left the group, a decision that was amicable with Dallin and Woodward. O'Sullivan later stated in interviews that her role in Bananarama was that of a paid employee and that she was given no say in the creative, musical or visual direction of the group. She said that this lack of input, along with the continued emphasis by the music press that she was the "new girl" and constant questions of "How does it feel to replace Siobhan?", contributed to her exit.

When French and Saunders parodied Bananarama in their 1988 Christmas special as "Lananenenoonoo", O'Sullivan was portrayed by Kathy Burke as "Kim". O'Sullivan's perceived lack of input into the group was used as a source of humour, with Kim ignored and dismissed in interviews and group discussions.

=== 1992–96: Slippry Feet ===
When she left Bananarama, O'Sullivan was invited to join the disco act Slippry Feet from 1992 to 1996. They recorded songs for a record titled Freak Time Viewing and then disbanded.

=== 2001–present: New management, Freak Time Viewing and The Jacquie O Collection ===
In 2001, O'Sullivan signed a three-album deal with AlmaFame Records, featuring unreleased songs from throughout her music career. The first release in late 2001 was the Slippry Feet album Freak Time Viewing. In early 2002, the Shillelagh Sisters album, Sham'Rock & Roll, was released and a third album, tentatively titled The Jacquie O Collection, featuring new songs and re-recordings of her hits with Bananarama, was announced but the record label folded and nothing was released.

In 2005, she appeared briefly on the second video clip (also called 'whitey version') of Siobhan Fahey's song "Pulsatron".

=== 1994–2015: Yoga teacher and massage therapist ===
O'Sullivan went to India and in 1994 trained to be a yoga teacher. She continued to teach and on her travels has taught yoga all over the world. She continued with her yoga education, taking teacher training with the Prana Yoga College.
