= Sara Dallin =

English pop singer

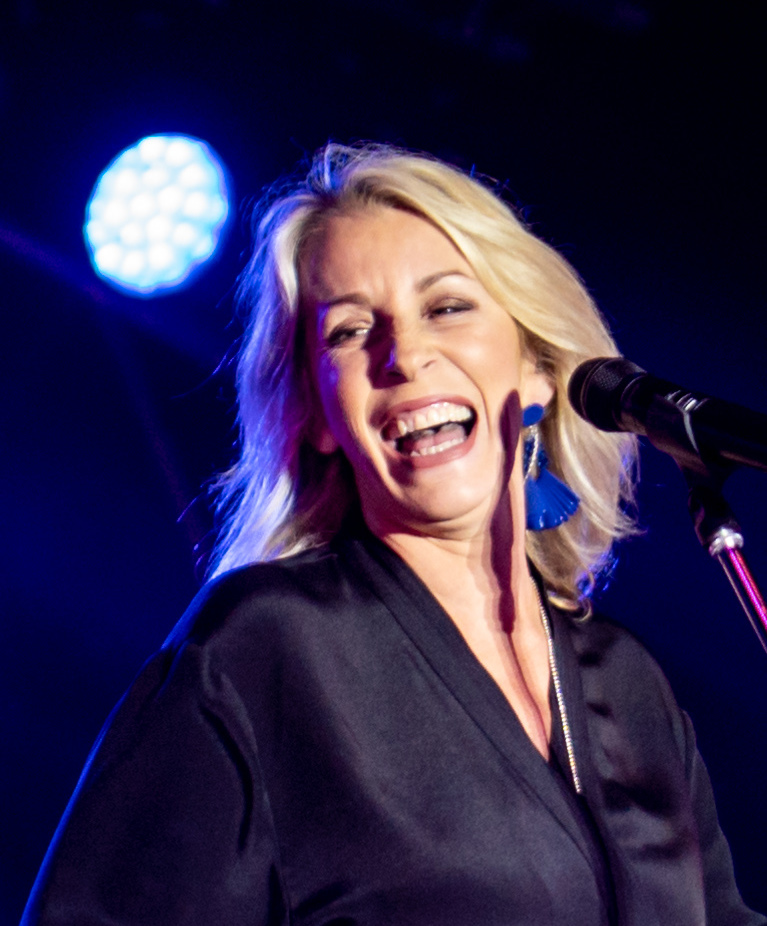
- Dallin performing with Bananarama in June 2018

Background information
- Born: Sara Elizabeth Dallin; 17 December 1961 (age 64)
- Origin: Bristol, England
- Genres: Pop; new wave
- Occupations: Singer; songwriter
- Years active: 1981–present
- Member of: Bananarama

Sara Elizabeth Dallin (born 17 December 1961) is an English singer/songwriter and a founding member of the pop group Bananarama. The group has achieved 28 UK top-50 and 11 US top-100 singles, including a US number one with "Venus" (1986). Other hits include "Cruel Summer" (1983), "I Heard a Rumour" (1987) and "Love in the First Degree" (1987). Dallin and bandmate Keren Woodward are the only performers to appear on both the 1984 and 1989 Band Aid versions of "Do They Know It's Christmas?". Bananarama have sold over 30 million records and entered the Guinness Book of World Records for achieving most UK chart entries by an all-female group, a record they still hold.

== Early life ==
Dallin is of English, French and Irish ancestry. She studied journalism at the London College of Fashion (University of Arts) in 1980–81. She formed the group Bananarama with Keren Woodward, her childhood friend, and Siobhan Fahey, whom she met at college. In 1980, Dallin and Woodward met Paul Cook, the former drummer of the Sex Pistols, in a club and they became close friends. They sang backing vocals for his and Steve Jones' new band the Professionals, and had their first taste of the music business, recording demos in Denmark Street.

When the house they were living in closed for renovation, Paul offered them a place to live in what used to be band impresario Malcolm McLaren's office above the Sex Pistols' old rehearsal room in Denmark Street. The two would come in from clubbing and plug the guitars in and have late-night jams.

Dallin first appeared on stage with Woodward and friend Mel O'Brien at the Camden Palace (now Koko) with their friend Vaughn Toulouse's band, Department S. Dallin, Woodward and Fahey first appeared on stage (in what would become Bananarama) with the Monochrome Set (friends of Siobhan) at the Rainbow Theatre supporting Iggy Pop. The trio then started rehearsing with musician friends and recorded their first demo "Aie A Mwana", which they performed at various clubs around London, such as (Colonel Barefoot's Rock Garden, The Embassy and The Wag Club. They came to the attention of Demon Records, signed a one-off singles deal, and "Aie A Mwana" was released. It was played by legendary BBC Radio 1 DJ John Peel, who championed young bands. Terry Hall (ex-Specials) heard the track and bought it, then saw a photo of Bananarama in what was referred to as the 'style bible', a magazine called The Face. He had just formed a group called Fun Boy Three and contacted them to ask if they would sing on some tracks on their new album. The single release "It Ain't What You Do (It's The Way That You Do It)" became a top-five hit, propelling Bananarama into the limelight.

== Career ==
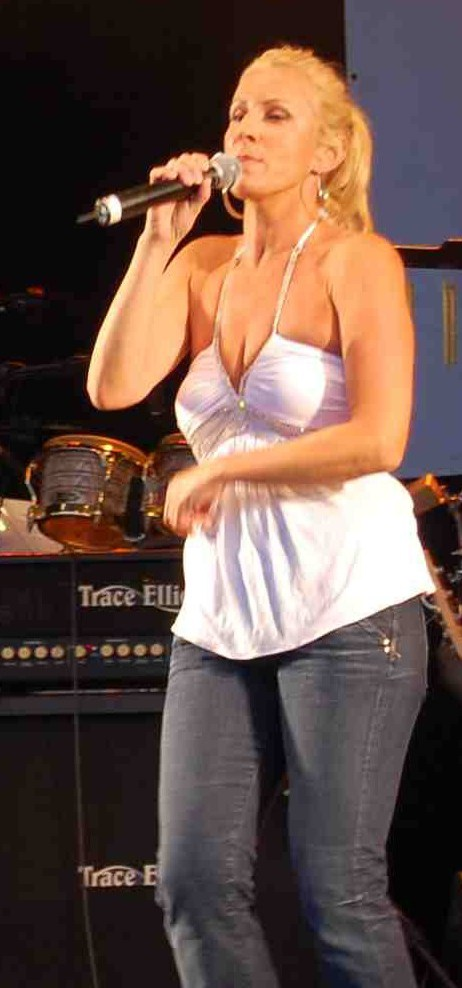
Dallin with Bananarama in 2007

Dallin, Fahey and Woodward formed Bananarama and released their first single, "Aie a Mwana", in 1981. The trio went on to have a string of top 10 hits in the UK, including "Shy Boy" (1982), "Robert De Niro's Waiting" (1984) and "Love in the First Degree" (1987). They also achieved international success, including in the United States, where they had top 10 hits with "Cruel Summer" (1984), "Venus" (number one in 1986) and "I Heard a Rumour" (1987). Fahey's replacement in 1988 was Jacquie O'Sullivan, with hits in this period including "I Want You Back" (1988). O'Sullivan left in 1991, after which Dallin and Woodward continued as a duo. In 2017 they briefly reunited with Fahey for a series of live dates dubbed 'The Original Line Up Tour'. The original line-up of Bananarama received the Icon Award at the Glamour Awards in June 2017.

== Personal life ==
Dallin was engaged to former Bananarama dancer Bassey Walker. The couple had a daughter in 1991 but later separated.
