= Keren Woodward =

English singer

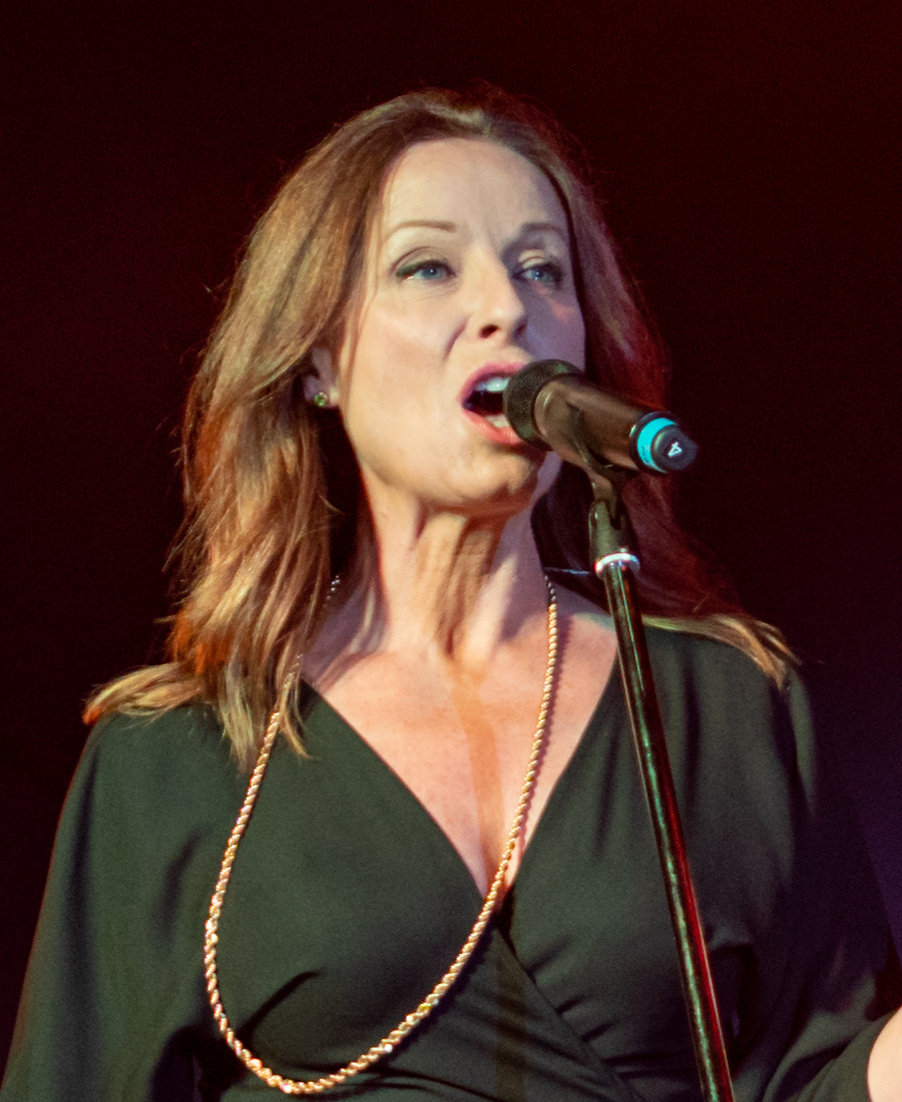
- Woodward performing with Bananarama in 2018

Background information
- Born: Keren Jane Woodward; 2 April 1961 (age 65)
- Origin: Bristol, England
- Genres: Pop; new wave
- Occupations: Singer; songwriter
- Years active: 1979–present
- Member of: Bananarama

Keren Jane Woodward (born 2 April 1961) is an English singer/songwriter and, with Sara Dallin and Siobhan Fahey, a founding member of the girl group Bananarama. In 1986, the trio reached number one on the US Billboard Hot 100 with their version of "Venus". Woodward and Dallin are the only constant members of Bananarama, and both have been a part of the group for over 40 years since 1979.

== Early life and education ==
Woodward was born in Bristol, England—where she met Dallin. She was educated at the London College of Fashion. Woodward is a classically trained pianist; she sang in choirs and performed in amateur dramatics with Dallin, whom she has known since childhood. After leaving school, Woodward worked as a pensions clerk at the BBC in Portland Place, London.

== Career ==
Woodward formed Bananarama with Dallin and Fahey, releasing their first single "Aie a Mwana" in 1981. They went on to have a string of UK top-ten hits and top the American charts in 1986 with "Venus". Fahey left the band in 1988, to be replaced by Jacquie O'Sullivan, who left in 1991.

Woodward and Dallin have performed as a duo from 1991. They briefly reunited with Fahey in April 2017 and received the Icon Award at the Glamour Awards in June 2017. The trio toured the UK in November and December 2017 and North America in February 2018. They performed their final dates as a trio in August 2018.

== Personal life ==
In the mid-1980s, Woodward had a relationship with model David Scott-Evans, with whom she had a son (Thomas) born on 31 December 1986.

In 1990, Woodward began dating Andrew Ridgeley, formerly of the musical duo Wham! They lived with her son in a 15th-century converted barn in Wadebridge in North Cornwall. They ended their relationship in November 2017.
