= Terry Hall discography =

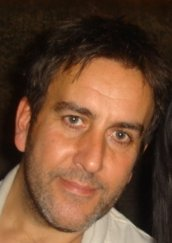
- Studio albums: 2
- Extended plays: 1
- Compilation albums: 3

This is the discography of Terry Hall (born Terence Edward Hall; 19 March 1959 in Coventry, England – 18 December 2022) who was the lead singer of the Specials, and formerly of Fun Boy Three, the Colourfield, Terry, Blair & Anouchka and Vegas. He released his first solo album, Home, in 1994.

== Studio albums ==
- Below is a list of all the studio albums Hall has been involved with.

Year	Album details	Chart positions		
Year	Album details	UK	NZ	US
1979	The Specials (with The Specials): Released: November 1979; Label: 2-Tone	4	5	84
1980	More Specials (with The Specials): Released: October 1980; Label: 2-Tone	5	28	98
1982	Fun Boy Three (with Fun Boy Three): Released: March 1982; Label: Chrysalis	7	17	–
1983	Waiting (with Fun Boy Three): Released: February 1983; Label: Chrysalis	14	11	104
1985	Virgins & Philistines (with The Colourfield): Released: April 1985; Label: Chrysalis	12	28	–
1987	Deception (with The Colourfield): Released: March 1987; Label: Chrysalis	95	–	–
1990	Ultra Modern Nursery Rhymes (with Terry, Blair & Anouchka): Released: February 1990; Label: Chrysalis	–	–	–
1992	Vegas (with Vegas): Released: 1992; Label: BMG	–	–	–
1994	Home: Released: 12 September 1994; Label: Anxious Records	95	–	–
1997	Laugh: Released: 6 October 1997; Label: Southsea Bubble Company	50	–	–
2003	The Hour of Two Lights (Terry Hall with Mushtaq): Released: 21 July 2003; Label: Honest Jon's/EMI	–	–	–
2019	Encore (with The Specials): Released: 1 February 2019; Label: UMG	1	–	–
2021	Protest Songs 1924–2012 (with The Specials): Released: 1 October 2021; Label: UMG	2	–	–

== Compilation albums ==
Three compilation albums have been released that chronicle Hall's career through the different groups and solo work he has produced.

- The Collection (Chrysalis, 2 November 1992)
- Through the Years (EMI, 2001)
- The Complete Terry Hall (EMI Gold, 2001)

== Singles ==
- Below is a list of all the singles Hall has been involved with.

Year	Title	Artist credit	Chart positions			Album
Year	Title	Artist credit	UK	IRL	NZ	Album
1979	"Gangsters"	The Special A.K.A.	6	27	20	—
1979	"A Message to You, Rudy"	The Specials	10	19	29	The Specials
1980	The Special AKA Live! ("Too Much Too Young")	The Specials	1	3	–	The Specials
1980	"Rat Race"	The Specials	5	17	–	—
1980	"Stereotype"	The Specials	6	12	–	More Specials
1980	"Do Nothing"	The Specials	4	13	–	More Specials
1981	"Ghost Town"	The Specials	1	3	20	—
1981	"The Lunatics (Have Taken Over the Asylum)"	Fun Boy Three	20	28	46	Fun Boy Three
1982	"It Ain't What You Do...." (Fun Boy Three with Bananarama)	Fun Boy Three	4	5	37	Fun Boy Three
1982	"Really Saying Something" (Bananarama with Fun Boy Three)	Fun Boy Three	5	9	–	—
1982	"The Telephone Always Rings"	Fun Boy Three	17	29	–	Fun Boy Three
1982	"Summertime"	Fun Boy Three	18	13	–	—
1982	"The More I See (The Less I Believe)"	Fun Boy Three	68	–	–	Waiting
1983	"Tunnel of Love"	Fun Boy Three	10	14	–	Waiting
1983	"Our Lips Are Sealed"	Fun Boy Three	7	13	–	Waiting
1984	"The Colourfield"	The Colourfield	43	–	–	—
1984	"Can't Get Enough of You Baby"	The Colourfield	–	–	–	—
1984	"Take"	The Colourfield	70	–	–	Virgins & Philistines
1985	"Thinking of You"	The Colourfield	12	11	–	Virgins & Philistines
1985	"Castles in the Air"	The Colourfield	51	–	–	Virgins & Philistines
1986	"Things Could Be Beautiful"	The Colourfield	83	–	–	—
1987	"Running Away"	The Colourfield	84	–	–	Deception
1987	"She"	The Colourfield	–	–	–	Deception
1989	"Missing"	Terry, Blair & Anouchka	75	–	–	Ultra Modern Nursery Rhymes
1990	"Ultra Modern Nursery Rhyme"	Terry, Blair & Anouchka	77	–	–	Ultra Modern Nursery Rhymes
1992	"Sense"	with The Lightning Seeds	31	–	39	—
1992	"Possessed"	Vegas	32	–	–	Vegas
1992	"She"	Vegas	43	–	–	Vegas
1993	"Walk into the Wind"	Vegas	65	–	–	Vegas
1994	"Forever J"	Terry Hall	67	–	–	Home
1994	"Sense"	Terry Hall	54	–	–	Home
1995	Rainbows EP	Terry Hall	62	–	–	Home
1997	"Ballad of a Landlord"	Terry Hall	50	–	–	Laugh
1997	"I Saw the Light"	Terry Hall	–	–	–	Laugh
2001	"911"	Gorillaz and D12 featuring Terry Hall	–	–	–	—
2002	"Lil' Dub Chefin'"	with Spacemonkeyz featuring Gorillaz	73	–	–	—
2003	"Problem Is"	Dub Pistols featuring Terry Hall	66	–	–	—
2007	"Rapture"	Dub Pistols featuring Rodney P and Terry Hall	–	–	–	—
2007	"Peaches"	Dub Pistols featuring Terry Hall	–	–	–	—

== Contributions ==
- 1992 – Co-wrote "Sense", "Where Flowers Fade" and "A Small Slice of Heaven" with The Lightning Seeds from Sense.
- 1994 – Co-wrote "Lucky You" with The Lightning Seeds from Jollification.
- 1995 – "Dream a Little Dream" with Salad from Help: A Charity Project for the Children of Bosnia
- 1996 – "Poems" with Tricky and Martina Topley-Bird from Nearly God. "Bubbles" with Tricky
- 1996 – Co-wrote "Imaginary Friends", "What If..." and "Like You Do" with The Lightning Seeds from Dizzy Heights.
- 1999 – Co-wrote "I Wish I Was in Love" with The Lightning Seeds and Peter Green from Tilt.
- 2008 – Co-wrote and provided vocals on "Time To Blow" and "Why Should I?" on Leila's album Blood, Looms and Blooms
- 2009 – Featured Artist on "Was It Worth It?" from Shakespears Sister available on the album Songs from the Red Room

== See also ==
- The Specials discography
- Fun Boy Three discography
- The Colourfield discography
