= Old Mill (ride) =

Type of amusement park ride

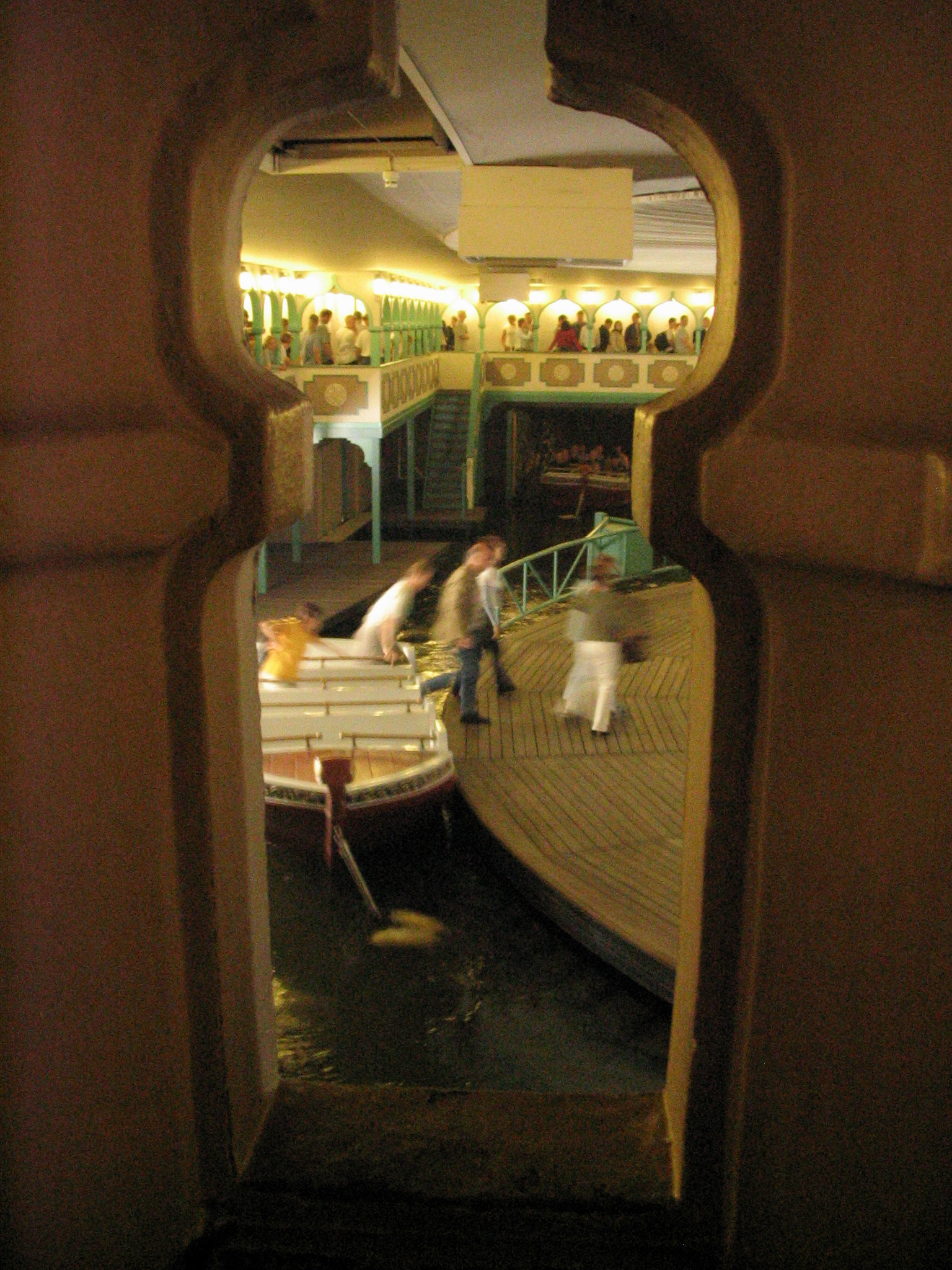
Fata Morgana at Efteling in the Netherlands.

An old mill is a type of amusement park ride where unaccompanied boats float on guideways and traverse through dark tunnels. These themed dark rides originated in the late 19th century and are known by a variety of names, including tunnel of love and river cave. While generally considered a gentle ride, a variation of an old mill featuring a climactic splashdown ending, similar to the modern-day log flume, is known as a mill chute.

== History ==
=== Tunnel of love ===
In early incarnations of old mill attractions, riders boarded two-passenger boats that floated along guided tracks through dark passages. Many were either relaxing, romantic rides encouraging cuddling, or they were themed as haunted attractions where couples would cling to one another. The darkness provided a degree of privacy, and the frightening scenes offered a socially acceptable excuse for physical contact during an era when public affection – holding hands, hugging, and kissing – was considered inappropriate.

The appeal of such rides wore off as socially-accepted norms over public affection became less conservative and strict, including a reduced stigma for unmarried couples to engage in physical contact. Many were either rethemed as children's attractions or torn down completely.

=== Mill chute ===
A "mill chute" is a variation of the old mill, featuring endings with steep drops that often splashed or soaked riders. The primary difference between an old mill and a mill chute is the steepness of the drop at the end, hence the name "chute", which is milder in old mills or non-existent. Both types can feature the same-styled grottos and caverns. While old mills began rising in popularity during the late 19th century, the mill chute variation did not become prominent until the 1920s. The mill chute is considered the predecessor to the modern-day log flume ride.

=== River caves ===
The river cave variation emphasizes decorated caves and tunnels that feature different themed scenes of lighting, sounds, props, animatronics, or other visual effects. Boats on these rides would drift along on a gentle current, commonly generated by a paddle wheel. This type of amusement ride became popular at amusement parks across the UK and the US in the mid-20th century. The concept of the river cave is also very similar to those of the early scenic railways, intended to be both educational and entertaining.

Once a popular feature of many amusement parks around the world, river caves have become increasingly rare and can only be found in a few locations. Despite their popularity in the mid-20th century, the rise of more modern thrill rides in the latter half of the 20th century led to their eventual demise. Declining popularity resulted in the dismantling and destruction of aging designs with mechanical wear.

== Notable installations ==
Name	Location	Opened	Closed	Designer	Notes
Old Mill Ride	(United States) Sea Lion Park, Coney Island	1895	1902	Paul Boyton	(Note: The park was closed in 1902 and later reopened as Luna Park, with renamed and rethemed attractions.)
Old Mill / Hard Headed Harold's Horrendously Humorous Haunted Hideaway / Garfield's Nightmare	(United States) Kennywood Park	1901			(Note: Known as the world's oldest operating old mill attraction, the ride has been renamed and rethemed several times, to "Around-the-World" in 1954, "Hard-Headed Harrold's Horrendously Humorous Haunted Hideaway" in 1974, and "Garfield's Nightmare" in 2004.)
Old Mill	(United States) Rocky Glen Park	1904	Circa 1913	Frederick Ingersoll	
River Caves	(United Kingdom) Blackpool Pleasure Beach	1905	2024		
The Red Mill	(United States) Luna Park, Coney Island	1907	1944		(Note: Redesigned in 1913)
Ye Olde Mill	(United States) Olentangy Park	1904 (original)	1911	Aquarama Company	(Note: Originally was going to be called "Aquarama," but changed to Ye Olde Mill. Destroyed by a fire in July 1911 and rebuilt in a more northern part of the park in 1918.)
River Caves	(United Kingdom) Pleasureland Southport	1908	2004	Helters Ltd	(Note: Originally located at the first Pleasure park in Southport, it was moved to Pleasureland in 1922.)
Ye Old Mill	(United States) Minnesota State Fair	1915			(Note: Opened by John Keenan in 1915, Ye Old Mill is the fair's oldest attraction. The fair purchased the attraction for $80,000 from the Keenan family in 2018.)
Ye Old Mill	(United States) Kansas State Fair	1915			
Kärlekstunneln	(Sweden) Gröna Lund	1917			(Note: Remodeled in 1987)
Ye Olde Mill	(United States) Olentangy Park	1918 (rebuilt)	1937		(Note: After fire destroyed the original, it was rebuilt in a more northern part of the park in 1918 and operated until the park was sold after its 1937 season.)
Old Mill (Shooting the Rapids)	(United States) Seabreeze Amusement Park	1920	Circa 1940	John A. Miller	
Ye Old Mill	(United States) Iowa State Fair	1921			(Note: Restored in 1996)
River Cave	(United Kingdom) Dreamland Margate	1924	1984		
Tokio Canal	(United States) Rocky Glen Park	1924	1950	John A. Miller	(Note: Was a part of Nallin-Jennings half of Park in Moosic, Pennsylvania. Sometimes spelled as "Tokyo"; Name changed to "Glen Canal" some time after World War II; Was built underneath the Pippin Coaster (1924-1950). The ride was destroyed May 24 1950 after a massive fire also took the Pippin, the Fun House, and Ben Sterling’s Penny Arcade (who owned the other half of the park).)
Boat Chute	(United States) Lake Winnepesaukah	1927		Carl O. Dixon	(Note: Oldest Mill Chute ride in the US)
Journey to the Center of the Earth	(United States) Dorney Park & Wildwater Kingdom	1927	1992		(Note: Themed "Journey to the Center of the Earth" in 1960 by dark ride designer Bill Tracy, the ride featured illuminated scenes of trolls, giant spiders, snakes, and miners.)
Mill Chute / Lost River	(United States) Hersheypark	1929	1972	Philadelphia Toboggan Company	(Note: Originally designed by renowned coaster designer Herbert Schmeck, the ride was rethemed in 1964 to the "Lost River" by Bill Tracy. The attraction was destroyed in 1972's Hurricane Agnes.)
Old Mill	(United States) Rye Playland	1929			(Note: Remodeled by Sally Corporation in 1989)
It's a Small World	(United States) Disneyland	1966		Walt Disney Imagineering	(Note: Originally premiered at the 1964 New York World's Fair before being relocated to Disneyland. Other similar installations opened later at other Disney Parks in 1971, 1983, 1992, and 2008.) (Note: It's a Small World (Magic Kingdom, Tokyo Disneyland and Hong Kong Disneyland versions) and Gran Fiesta Tour are only two with indoor boarding.)
Gran Fiesta Tour Starring The Three Caballeros/El Rio del Tiempo	(United States) Epcot	1982		Walt Disney Imagineering	(Note: Originally premiered at the 1964 New York World's Fair before being relocated to Disneyland. Other similar installations opened later at other Disney Parks in 1971, 1983, 1992, and 2008.) (Note: It's a Small World (Magic Kingdom, Tokyo Disneyland and Hong Kong Disneyland versions) and Gran Fiesta Tour are only two with indoor boarding.)
Pirates of the Caribbean	(United States) Disneyland	1967		Walt Disney Imagineering	(Note: Originally envisioned as a walk-through wax museum, but later use the same boat ride system of the boat ride It's a Small World)
Monster Mansion/Tales of the Okefenokee	(United States) Six Flags Over Georgia	1978		Gary Goddard, Al Bertino, Phil Mendez, Tony Christopher	(Note: The old boat ride Tales of the Okefenokee is the predecessor of the Splash Mountain)

Table notes

== In popular culture ==
In the 1928 film The Crowd, a tunnel of love is featured in which the sides are voyeuristically pulled down at a place where couples are likely to be kissing. The 1951 Alfred Hitchcock film Strangers on a Train features a tunnel of love ride that becomes the scene of a murder.

The tunnel of love was a favorite source of amusing scenes in Hanna-Barbera television series such as The Flintstones, The Jetsons, and Scooby-Doo, among others, often in a chase sequence gag in which rivals or combatants are shown entering the ride, then exiting in a romantic embrace. The tunnel of love has also appeared in Disney cartoons, in which a jealous Donald Duck storms the tunnel by foot and ruins the ride for a rival suitor and Daisy Duck.

In 1980, Dire Straits released a single entitled "Tunnel of Love" from their album Making Movies. In 1983, Fun Boy Three released the song "The Tunnel of Love" as part of their album Waiting. Bruce Springsteen recorded an album called Tunnel of Love in 1987 and a song of the same name.

A 1990 episode of the TV series 21 Jump Street was called "Tunnel of Love".

Tunnels of love are seen in a 1996 episode of Hey Arnold! ("Operation Ruthless"), a 2008 episode of The Simpsons ("Love, Springfieldian Style"), a 2010 episode of American Dad! ("May the Best Stan Win") and a 2011 episode of SpongeBob SquarePants ("Tunnel of Glove").

In the graphic novel The Dark Knight Returns, an alternative future story published in 1986 that features the Batman supervillain Joker fighting with Batman in a tunnel of love and manages, after putting the superhero into a fit of rage, to frame Batman for his murder.

The video game Left 4 Dead 2's level Dark Carnival features a Tunnel of Love at the fictional Whispering Oaks Amusement Park. A tunnel of love is a location in the browser game Poptropica's quest titled Monster Carnival, available online from 2014 to 2020, and currently available via Steam.

In the Happy Tree Friends web series 2009 episode "My Better Half", two of the main characters, Handy and Petunia, are seen going through a Tunnel of Love on a swan, which leads to a sawmill that kills them in graphic ways.

== Gallery ==
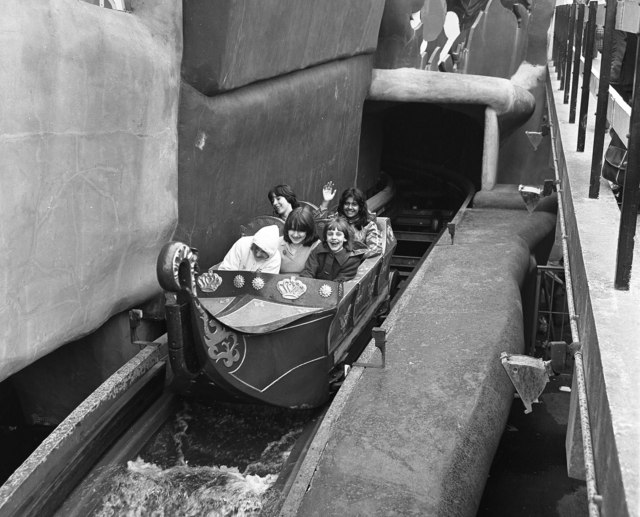
"The River Caves of the World" at Pleasure Beach, Blackpool

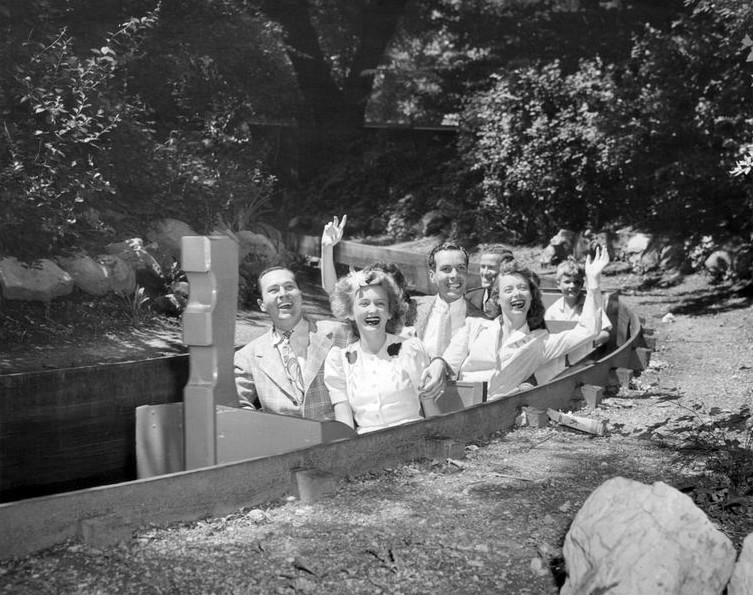
Riverview Park, Chicago

== See also ==
- Log flume (ride)
- Tow boat ride
- Dark ride
- List of incidents at independent amusement parks
