= Home (Terry Hall album) =

Studio album by Terry Hall
- Released: 12 September 1994
- Recorded: Liverpool, Spring 1994
- Genre: Pop, rock
- Length: 39:14
- Label: Anxious Records
- Producer: Ian Broudie

Terry Hall chronology
Vegas by Vegas (1992)	Home (1994)	Laugh (1997)

Singles from Home
- 1. "Forever J" Released: 15 August 1994; 2. "Sense" Released: 31 October 1994; 3. "Rainbows EP" Released: 9 October 1995

Professional ratings
Review scores
Source	Rating
AllMusic	3/5 stars
Music Week	3/5 stars

Home is the début solo-album by the British singer Terry Hall. It was released in 1994 on the Anxious label.

Although Hall had been in the music industry for fifteen years at the time of release, Home was his first album credited to him alone; previously Hall had recorded and fronted the Specials, Fun Boy Three, the Colourfield, Terry, Blair & Anouchka and Vegas.

The album was critically acclaimed when released but was not a commercial success, peaking at number ninety-five on the UK Albums Chart. It includes the singles "Forever J", "Sense" and the Rainbows EP which featured "Chasing a Rainbow". In 1995 the album was re-released with a different picture sleeve and had the inclusion of the track "Chasing a Rainbow" co-written by and featuring Damon Albarn. Both editions of the album have since been deleted and are difficult to purchase.

Hall wrote the majority of the album with guitarist Craig Gannon and wrote in collaboration with several acclaimed musicians namely Ian Broudie of the Lightning Seeds, Andy Partridge of XTC, Nick Heyward of Haircut One Hundred and Damon Albarn of Blur on "Chasing a Rainbow", which was an extra track on the reissue, released on 30 October 1995. The album was produced by Ian Broudie, with whom Hall had previously worked during his time with the Colourfield and on Broudie's 1992 Lightning Seeds album Sense. Hall and Broudie have written and recorded together on the majority of Broudie's albums.

== Track listing ==
1. "Forever J" (Terry Hall, Craig Gannon) – 4:03
2. "You" (Hall, Ian Broudie) – 3:50
3. "Sense" (Hall, Broudie) – 3:39
4. "I Drew a Lemon" (Hall, Andy Partridge) – 3:36
5. "Moon on Your Dress" (Hall, Partridge) – 3:45
6. "No No No" (Hall, Gannon) – 4:04
7. "What's Wrong with Me" (Hall, Nick Heyward) – 4:08
8. "Grief Disguised as Joy" (Hall, Gannon) – 4:10
9. "First Attack of Love" (Hall, Gannon) – 3:41
10. "I Don't Got You" (Hall, Gannon) – 3:41

1995 edition extra track

11. "Chasing a Rainbow" (Hall, Damon Albarn) – 3:09

== Personnel ==
Musicians

- Terry Hall – vocals
- Les Pattinson – bass
- Chris Sharrock – drums
- Craig Gannon – guitar
- Simon Rogers – keyboards, effects
- Andy Redhead – percussion
- Clive Layton – piano, organ
- Angie Pollock – vocals
- Belinda Leith – vocals
- Sam Obernik – vocals
- Ian Broudie – guitar on "You" and "Sense"
- Damon Albarn – featured performer on "Chasing a Rainbow"

Technical

- Ian Broudie – producer
- Cenzo Townshend – engineer
- Ian McFarlane – engineering assistant
- Bob Kraushaar - remixing on "Forever J" and "Sense"
- Alison Tutton – design
- Terry Hall – sleeve concept
- Juergen Teller – sleeve photography
- Tom Sheehan – photography

== Chart positions ==
Album

Chart (1994)	Peak position
UK Album Chart	95

Singles

Single	Chart (1994/5)	Position
"Forever J"	UK Singles Chart	67
"Forever J"	German Media Control Singles chart	90
"Sense"	UK Singles Chart	54
"Sense"	German Media Control Singles chart	53
Rainbows EP (including "Chasing a Rainbow")	UK Singles Chart	62
