= Oui 3 =

British music act

- Origin: London, England
- Genres: Electronic, hip hop, acid jazz, trip hop
- Years active: 1991–1995
- Labels: MCA
- Past members: Blair Booth; Philipp Erb; Trevor Miles

Oui 3 were an electronic dance music group, best known for their songs "Break from the Old Routine" (which reached number 17 on the UK Singles Chart in July 1993), "The Joy of Living", and their Buffalo Springfield sampled 1993 hit "For What It's Worth" (which reached number 26 in the UK in October 1993).

== Career ==
The three group members were Blair Booth, Philipp Erb, and Trevor Miles. Blair Booth is an American singer, songwriter and arranger. She had previously worked as the songwriting partner of former Specials singer Terry Hall in Terry, Blair & Anouchka, at the end of the 1980s. She went on to work with a number of other notable figures in the British music industry such as Billy MacKenzie (The Associates), Nick Heyward and Marc Almond.

Meanwhile, Swiss programmer Philipp Erb had spent most of the 1980s as an engineer and programmer for several musicians, including a period with Genesis P. Orridge's Psychic TV. The pair teamed up with the South London rapper Trevor Miles.

Their debut album, Oui Love You, was released in 1993 and featured Jah Wobble on the title track. The album was produced and mainly mixed by the trio, although some tracks were mixed by Mark "Spike" Stent, Youth and Phil Bodger.

A second album remained unreleased. Booth continued to write and record her own material, but little has been heard musically from Erb or Miles.

Faithless have since cited Oui 3 as an influence.

== Discography ==
=== Albums ===
- Oui Love You (1993) - UK No. 39

=== Singles ===
- "For What It's Worth" (1993) - No. 28 (adapted cover of the Buffalo Springfield song of the same name)
- "Arms of Solitude" (1993) - No. 54
- "Break from the Old Routine" (1993) - No. 17
- "For What It's Worth" (1993) - No. 26
- "Facts of Life" (1994) - No. 38
- "Joy of Living" (1995) - No. 55
- "Crazy" (1995) - No. 85
  - Chart placings refer to the UK Singles Chart.
