= The Colour Field =

EP by The Colour Field
- Released: January 1986
- Recorded: 1985
- Genres: New wave, alternative rock
- Length: 24:01
- Label: Chrysalis
- Producers: Ian Broudie, Hugh Jones

The Colour Field chronology
Virgins and Philistines (1985)	The Colour Field (1986)	Deception (1987)

Professional ratings
Review scores
Source	Rating
AllMusic	(3/5)

The Colour Field is the second release by the British new wave band the Colour Field. This EP was released only in the US. The UK had already seen all of the songs released as either a single or a 12".

== Track listing ==
All tracks written by Terry Hall and Toby Lyons.

Side one
No.	Title	Length
1.	"Things Could Be Beautiful"	3:24
2.	"Frosty Morning"	4:21
3.	"Armchair Theater"	4:58

Side two
No.	Title	Length
4.	"Faint Hearts"	3:55
5.	"Pushing Up Daisies" (Live at Hammersmith Palais)	3:50
6.	"Yours Sincerely" (Live at Hammersmith Palais)	3:33

== Personnel ==
The Colour Field

- Terry Hall - all instruments and voices
- Toby Lyons - all instruments and voices
- Karl Shale - all instruments and voices
- Gary Dwyer - drums
