= Vegas (Vegas album) =

Studio album by Vegas
- Released: 1992
- Recorded: The Church Studio
- Genres: Electronic, rock
- Length: 48:53
- Labels: RCA, BMG

Singles from Vegas
- 1. "Possessed" Released: September 1992; 2. "She" Released: November 1992; 3. "Walk into the Wind" Released: April 1993

Terry Hall chronology
Ultra Modern Nursery Rhymes by Terry, Blair & Anouchka (1990)	Vegas (1992)	Home (1994)

David A. Stewart chronology
Honest by Dave Stewart and the Spiritual Cowboys (1991)	Vegas (1992)	Greetings from the Gutter (1994)

Professional ratings
Review scores
Source	Rating
AllMusic	4.5/5 stars

Vegas is the self-titled album by the one-off collaborative group featuring British artists Terry Hall (best known as vocalist for 2 tone and ska revival band the Specials and subsequent offshoot band Fun Boy Three) and Dave Stewart of Eurythmics. The duo worked with the assistance of drummer and programmer Olle Romö and engineer Emmanuel 'Manu' Guiot (with Dave Stewart also using this surname professionally with the pseudonym Jean Guiot), both former collaborators with Stewart on Eurythmics projects. Vegas includes the singles "Possessed", "She" and "Walk into the Wind". Of the three, only "Possessed" charted in the UK top 40, whilst "Walk into the Wind" featured Shakespears Sister's Siobhan Fahey (then Stewart's wife). Receiving positive reviews, the album was released on CD, cassette and vinyl LP by the major record label RCA/BMG in October 1992, but failed to chart. The album has since been deleted. However it is available on Apple Music/iTunes.

The album was written by Hall and Stewart with the exception of the standard "She". No performer credits are provided; AllMusic speculates that Vegas is almost certainly a Dave Stewart production. Stewart likely was responsible for the majority of the musical backing with assistance from Romo and Guiot, and Hall contributing his vocal.

Following the album's commercial failure, the group split. Hall subsequently launched a solo career, releasing Home in 1994. Stewart also returned to solo work, releasing Greetings from the Gutter in 1994. The pair reunited in 1997 to support Bob Dylan during his Never Ending Tour for a pair of concerts in Japan.

== Track listing ==
All tracks composed by Dave Stewart and Terry Hall; except where noted.

1. "Possessed" – 4:51
2. "Walk into the Wind" – 5:17
3. "She's Alright" – 4:13
4. "Take Me for What I Am" – 4:51
5. "The Trouble with Lovers" – 5:25
6. "Nothing Alas Alack" – 5:18
7. "The Thought of You" – 3:39
8. "Wise Guy" – 7:21
9. "The Day It Rained Forever" – 4:46
10. "She" (Charles Aznavour, Herbert Kretzmer) – 3:11

== Personnel ==
Performers

- Terry Hall
- Dave Stewart
- Olle Romö
- Manu Guiot

Technical

- Olle Romö – programming, production
- Darren Allison – engineering
- Recorded at The Church Studio

== B-sides ==
Vegas recorded an additional six tracks which were released as single B-sides. There were also three remixes of "She".

from "Possessed"

- "Lying in Bed Barefoot" (Stewart, Hall)
- "Infectious" (Stewart, Hall)

from "She"

- "Tip of My Tongue"
- "If You Kill My Cat I'll Kill Your Dog"
- "She (Disco Mix)"
- "She (Disco Mix Instrumental)"
- "She (Rapino Brothers Mix)"

from "Walk into the Wind"

- "Truth Is Stranger Than Fiction" (Hall, Stewart)
- "Art Blind" (Stewart, Hall)

== Chart positions ==
Singles

Single	Chart (1992/3)	Position
"Possessed"	UK Singles Chart	32
"She"	UK Singles Chart	43
"Walk into the Wind"	UK Singles Chart	65
