= Na Na Hey Hey Kiss Him Goodbye =

1969 single by Steam

Single by Steam

from the album Steam
- B-side: "It's the Magic in You Girl"
- Released: November 1969
- Recorded: 1969
- Studio: Mercury Sound Studios, New York
- Genre: Pop; pop rock
- Length: 4:08 (LP version); 6:20 (long version); 3:45 (45 version); 2:59 (45 radio version)
- Label: Fontana F 1667 (US)
- Songwriters: Paul Leka, Gary DeCarlo, Dale Frashuer
- Producer: Paul Leka

Steam singles chronology
"Na Na Hey Hey Kiss Him Goodbye" (1969)	"I've Gotta Make You Love Me" (1970)

"Na Na Hey Hey Kiss Him Goodbye" is a 1969 song written and recorded by Paul Leka, Gary DeCarlo, and Dale Frashuer, attributed to a then-fictitious band Steam. It was released under the Mercury subsidiary label Fontana and became a number-one pop single on the Billboard Hot 100 in late 1969, and remained on the charts in early 1970.

== Background and recording ==
Paul Leka, Gary DeCarlo and Dale Frashuer wrote a blues shuffle version of the song in the early 1960s when they were members of a doo-wop group from Bridgeport, Connecticut, originally called the Glenwoods, then the Citations, and finally, the Chateaus, of which Leka was the piano player. The group disbanded when Leka talked Frashuer into going into New York City with him to write and possibly produce. In 1969, DeCarlo (using the professional name Garrett Scott) recorded four songs at Mercury Records in New York with Leka as producer. The singles impressed the company's executives, who wanted to issue all of them as A-side singles. In need of a B-side for a song called "Sweet Laura Lee," Leka and DeCarlo resurrected an old song from their days as the Glenwoods, "Kiss Him Goodbye", with their old bandmate, Frashuer.

With DeCarlo as lead vocalist, they recorded the song in one session. Instead of using a full band, Leka played keyboards and had engineer Warren Dewey splice together a drum track from one of DeCarlo's four singles and a conga drum solo by Ange DiGeronimo recorded in Leka's Bridgeport, Connecticut studio for an entirely different session. "I said we should put a chorus to it (to make it longer)", Leka told Fred Bronson in The Billboard Book of Number One Hits. "I started writing while I was sitting at the piano going 'na, na, na, na, na, na, na, na'... Everything was 'na na' when you didn't have a lyric." Gary added "hey hey".

To the surprise of the songwriters, Mercury Records A&R executive Bob Reno insisted that "Na Na Hey Hey Kiss Him Goodbye" should be the A-side of the single, relegating "Sweet Laura Lee" to the B-side. Reno was right; "Na Na Hey Hey Kiss Him Goodbye" reached number one in the United States for two weeks, on December 6 1969, displacing "Come Together" by the Beatles. It was Billboard's final multi-week number 1 hit of the 1960s and also peaked at number twenty on the soul chart. In Canada, the song reached number six. By the beginning of the 21st century, sales of "Na Na Hey Hey Kiss Him Goodbye" had exceeded 6.5 million records, attaining multi-platinum record status.

== Chart history ==
=== Weekly charts ===
Chart positions for Steam's version of "Na Na Hey Hey Kiss Him Goodbye"
Chart (1969–1970)	Peak position
Australia (Kent Music Report)	22
Canada RPM Top Singles	6
Ireland (IRMA)	13
France (SNEP)	15
New Zealand (Listener)	2
South Africa (Springbok)	9
UK Singles Chart	9
US Billboard Hot 100	1
US Billboard Best Selling Soul Singles	20
US Cash Box Top 100	3

=== Year-end charts ===
Chart positions for Steam's version of "Na Na Hey Hey Kiss Him Goodbye"
Chart (1970)	Position
UK	82
US (Joel Whitburn's Pop Annual)	11

== Certifications ==
Certifications for "Na Na Hey Hey Kiss Him Goodbye"
Region	Certification	Certified units/sales
United States (RIAA)	Gold	1,000,000^{^}
^{^} Shipments figures based on certification alone.

== Other versions ==
=== Bananarama version ===
"Na Na Hey Hey Kiss Him Goodbye"

Single by Bananarama

from the album Deep Sea Skiving
- B-side: "Tell Tale Signs"
- Released: February 14, 1983
- Recorded: 1982
- Genre: Pop; new wave
- Length: 3:30
- Label: London
- Songwriters: Gary DeCarlo; Dale Frashuer; Paul Leka
- Producer: Jolley & Swain

Bananarama singles chronology
"Cheers Then" (1982)	"Na Na Hey Hey Kiss Him Goodbye" (1983)	"Cruel Summer" (1983)

In February 1983, UK girl group Bananarama released the song as a single from their album Deep Sea Skiving. It peaked at number 5 in the UK singles chart, and number 38 in Australia on the Kent Music Report chart.

==== Track listing ====
UK and USA 7-inch vinyl single UK: London Records NANA 4; USA: London Records 810 115-7

1. "Na Na Hey Hey Kiss Him Goodbye" 3:22
2. "Tell Tale Signs" 2:58

UK 12-inch vinyl single London Records NANX 4

1. "Na Na Hey Hey Kiss Him Goodbye" (Extended version) 4:52
2. "Na Na Hey Hey Na (Dub) Hey" 4:12
3. "Tell Tale Signs" (Extended version) 4:46

==== Music video ====
The music video directed by Keith McMillan features the band playing in a school playground and then being made to move by a group of men. They then decide to join a boxing club so the video features them singing the song whilst boxing. By the end of the video they return to the playground wearing leathers and this time make the group of men move away. They then ride off into the night on motorbikes.

==== Charts ====
Chart positions for Bananarama's version of "Na Na Hey Hey Kiss Him Goodbye"
Chart (1983)	Peak position
Australia (Kent Music Report)	38
Belgium (Ultratop 50 Flanders)	29
Ireland (IRMA)	4
Israel (IBA)	4
New Zealand (Recorded Music NZ)	29
UK (OCC)	5

=== The Nylons version ===
"Kiss Him Goodbye"

Single by the Nylons

from the album Happy Together
- B-side: "It's What They Call Magic"
- Released: January 1, 1987
- Recorded: 1987
- Genre: A cappella
- Length: 3:24
- Label: Attic
- Songwriters: Gary DeCarlo, Dale Frashuer, Paul Leka
- Producer: Bill Henderson

The Nylons singles chronology
"The Lion Sleeps Tonight" (1986)	"Kiss Him Goodbye" (1987)	"Happy Together" (1987)

In 1987, Canadian quartet the Nylons released a version of this song as a single under the shortened title "Kiss Him Goodbye". It became their biggest hit on the Billboard Hot 100, peaking at number twelve that summer, and reaching number 15 in Canada.

==== Track listing ====
Canada and USA 7-inch vinyl single Canada: Attic Records AT 348; USA: Open Air Records OS-0022

1. "Kiss Him Goodbye" 3:24
2. "It's What They Call Magic" 3:49

Canada and USA 12-inch vinyl single Canada: Attic Records AT 1240; USA: Open Air Records OS-12240

1. "Kiss Him Goodbye (Sheer N.R.G. mix)" 6:05
2. "Kiss Him Goodbye (Acapella version)" 4:05
3. "Kiss Him Goodbye (Dub version)" 5:15

== In popular culture ==
A 1970 cover by the Canadian R&B/funk band Wayne McGhie and the Sounds of Joy had no chart success on its own, but has been sampled in numerous hip hop recordings. When the band's long-forgotten album was reissued in 2004, Canadian music critic Bill Reynolds wrote that their cover was so good it should be used at sporting events instead of Steam's original.

In 1977, Chicago White Sox organist Nancy Faust began playing the song. It had previously been sung spontaneously by fans in the stands, possibly beginning in a series with the Minnesota Twins July 1–3, 1977, a four-game series swept by the White Sox. The fan version went "Minnesota, Minnesota, Hey Hey Good Bye". Nancy Faust began playing it regularly on the organ later that month. It is generally directed at the losing side in an elimination contest when the outcome is all but certain or when an individual player is ejected, disqualified, or, more often in baseball games, a pitching change is made during an inning (which is when Faust would play it). It has also been sung by crowds in political gatherings, to taunt political opponents or to drown out and mock disruptive counter-protesters. The song is sung a cappella by the crowd at ice hockey games in Canada (particularly in Montreal) at the end of games to say goodbye to the losing team.

The song was featured in the 2000 film Remember the Titans. It was also one of 164 included on the list of songs which were temporarily banned from public radio airplay by Clear Channel after the September 11 attacks (9/11).

On January 23, 2006, Paul Martin was defeated by Stephen Harper as Prime Minister of Canada. Martin had acceded to the prime ministry following the ouster of Jean Chrétien. The next day's issue of La Voix de l'Est, a French newspaper in Granby, Quebec, included a cartoon by Paquette showing Chrétien calling Martin and singing "Na Na Hey Hey Kiss Him Goodbye".

== See also ==
- List of 1960s one-hit wonders in the United States
