= Deception (album) =

Studio album by The Colourfield
- Released: 23 March 1987
- Recorded: 1986–87
- Studios: Davout Studio, Paris; Wool Hall Studio, Bath; 39th. St. Music, New York
- Genres: New wave, alternative rock
- Length: 40:29
- Label: Chrysalis Records
- Producers: Richard Gottehrer, Jeffery Lesser

The Colourfield chronology
The Colour Field (1986)	Deception (1987)	Ultra Modern Nursery Rhymes (1990)

Singles from Deception
- 1. "Running Away" b/w "Digging It Deep" Released: February 1987; 2. "She" b/w "Monkey in Winter" Released: 1987

Professional ratings
Review scores
Source	Rating
AllMusic	4/5 stars

Deception is the last album released by British new wave band the Colourfield. During the recording of the album Karl Shale left during the sessions. Terry Hall has since voiced his displeasure with the recording of the album because he did not feel he had the control of the session musicians and producers the way he needed to preserve the Colourfield's sound.

== Release ==
Deception was much less successful than its predecessor Virgins and Philistines, and only reached #95 in the UK. It was promoted by two singles, both cover versions. The first, "Running Away", a cover of the Sly and the Family Stone hit, made #84, and the second single, "She" (originally performed by The Monkees) didn't chart at all.

In 2010, the album along with Virgins and Philistines was re-released on CD in the UK by Cherry Red Records with additional bonus tracks.

== Track listing ==
All tracks written by Terry Hall and Toby Lyons; except as indicated.

Side one
No.	Title	Writer(s)	Length
1.	"Badlands"		4:47
2.	"Running Away"	Freddie Stewart, Sly Stone	3:56
3.	"From Dawn to Distraction"		3:42
4.	"Confession"		4:37
5.	"Miss Texas 1967"		4:13

Side two
No.	Title	Writer(s)	Length
6.	"She"	Tommy Boyce, Bobby Hart	3:22
7.	"Heart of America"		5:01
8.	"Digging It Deep"		3:54
9.	"Monkey in Winter"		5:16
10.	"Goodbye Sun Valley"		4:42

Bonus tracks
No.	Title	Writer(s)	Length
11.	"Things Could Be Beautiful"		3:25
12.	"Frosty Mornings"		4:20
13.	"She" (Single Mix)	Tommy Boyce, Bobby Hart	3:14
14.	"Monkey in Winter" (with Sinéad O'Connor)		5:00
15.	"Running Away" (Arthur Baker Dub Version)	Freddie Stewart, Sly Stone	7:10

== Personnel ==
The Colourfield

- Terry Hall - all instruments and voices
- Toby Lyons - all instruments and voices

Additional personnel

- Gregg Mangiafico – keyboards
- Sammy Merendino – drum programming
- Roland Orzabal - guitar on "Running Away" and "Confession"
- Dolette McDonald, Deborah Malone, Janice Pendarvis - backing vocals on "Digging It Deep"
