= Shy Boy =

Single by Bananarama

from the album Deep Sea Skiving
- B-side: "Don't Call Us"
- Released: 21 June 1982
- Recorded: March 1982
- Genre: New wave
- Length: 3:16
- Label: London
- Songwriter: Jolley & Swain
- Producer: Jolley & Swain

Bananarama singles chronology
"Really Saying Something" (1982)	"Shy Boy" (1982)	"Cheers Then" (1982)

Music video
- "Shy Boy" on YouTube

"Shy Boy" is a 1982 song recorded by the English girl group Bananarama which was written and produced by the production team of Steve Jolley and Tony Swain and marked the first in a long line of studio collaborations between them and Bananarama. Released in the summer of 1982, "Shy Boy" became the third consecutive single by Bananarama to hit the top-five, reaching number four in the UK singles chart. It also was a success in Australia, where it reached number two, becoming their first top 40 hit in that country. Top-ten success also followed in New Zealand and Canada. In the United States, where the song was released with the longer title "Shy Boy (Don't It Make You Feel Good)", it charted well on the Hot Dance Club Play chart and was the first of Bananarama's singles to dent the Billboard Hot 100, peaking at number 83.

It was included on their 1983 debut studio album Deep Sea Skiving. The song was originally called "Big Red Motorbike", however Bananarama did not like the lyrics and changed it to "Shy Boy".

In 2022, Rolling Stone ranked it 64 on their list "100 Best Songs of 1982".

== Critical reception ==
Upon the single release Robin Smith of Record Mirror placed it among singles of the week, found track palatable as ice cream and compared trio with the Supremes. Danny Baker called it "lovely stuff" and described it in his review for New Musical Express as "familiar beaty blend of drums, echo and those lovely Bananarama vocal arrangements on another easily remembered tune that should have us dancing all the way to the topspot in the charts".

== Music video ==
The music video was directed by Midge Ure and Chris Cross who were then members of the group Ultravox. It featured the girls giving a nerdy guy a make-over, turning him into a stud. When his new look attracts the attention of a sexy secretary, the girls get revenge by dousing them with a bucket of water. The nerd-turned-stud was played Terry Sharpe, the lead vocalist of the Northern Irish rock group the Adventures, who was Sara Dallin's boyfriend at the time.

== Track listing ==
UK 7" vinyl single London Records NANA 2

1. "Shy Boy" 3:13
2. "Don't Call Us" 3:10

Canadian 7" vinyl single Mercury Records MS 76178

1. "Shy Boy" 3:13
2. "Give Us Back Our Cheap Fares" 2:45
  S. Dallin/S. Fahey/K. Woodward/Cotillard

UK 12" vinyl single London Records NANX 2

1. "Shy Boy" (Extended Version) 5:49
2. "Don't Call Us" (Extended Version) 4:10

USA 12" vinyl single London Records 810 299-1

1. "Shy Boy (Don't it Make You Feel Good)" (Long Version) 6:58
2. "Shy Boy (Don't it Make You Feel Good)" (Dub Version) 9:22

The song "Don't Call Us" appears on the album Deep Sea Skiving retitled as "Boy Trouble".

== Chart performance ==
=== Weekly charts ===
Chart (1982–1983)	Peak position
Australia (Kent Music Report)	2
Belgium (Ultratop 50 Flanders)	6
Canada Top Singles (RPM)	7
Ireland (IRMA)	8
Israel (IBA)	12
Luxembourg (Radio Luxembourg)	5
Netherlands (Dutch Top 40)	12
Netherlands (Single Top 100)	12
New Zealand (Recorded Music NZ)	5
UK Singles (Official Charts)	4
US Billboard Hot 100	83
US Dance Club Songs (Billboard)	14

=== Year-end charts ===
Chart (1982)	Position
Australia (Kent Music Report)	19
Belgium (Ultratop Flanders)	72
