= Terry, Blair & Anouchka =

English pop group

- Origin: United Kingdom
- Genres: Pop
- Years active: 1989–1992
- Label: Cherry Red (UK)
- Members: Terry Hall; Blair Booth; Anouchka Grose

Terry, Blair & Anouchka were a musical group, active in the early 1990s. They were formed by Coventry-born singer Terry Hall, American musician Blair Booth and psychoanalyst/writer Anouchka Grose.

Terry Hall was previously a founding member and lead singer of the British ska group the Specials, the forefathers of the 2 tone era. This was before leaving with two other members to form the short-lived Fun Boy Three in 1981. Hall later formed the Colourfield in 1984.

== History ==
Terry, Blair & Anouchka were formed shortly after the dissolution of Terry's previous musical project the Colourfield. All three members shared a love for 1960s pop, as well as kitschy mainstream pop, as evidenced on the trio's cover of Captain & Tennille's "Love Will Keep Us Together". Their debut single "Missing" was released in the autumn of 1989 and peaked at number 75 on the UK Singles Chart. The trio's second single, "Ultra Modern Nursery Rhyme", reached number 77. Their debut album, also called Ultra Modern Nursery Rhymes, was released in February 1990. The group split shortly afterwards.

Blair Booth formed Oui 3 with Philipp Erb and Trevor Miles in 1991. Their most notable hit single was "Break from the Old Routine" in 1993.

In 1992, Terry Hall collaborated with Dave Stewart of Eurythmics under the name Vegas, before releasing a self-titled album that year.

== Discography ==
Albums

Year	Album details
1990	Ultra Modern Nursery Rhymes: Released: February 1990; Label: Chrysalis

Singles

Release date	Title	UK Singles Chart
Nov 1989	"Missing"	75
Feb 1990	"Ultra Modern Nursery Rhyme"	77
