= Saffiyah Khan =

British political activist

- Born: 27 November 1997 (age 28); Birmingham, England
- Occupations: Political activist; singer; model

Saffiyah Khan (born 27 November 1997) is an English political activist, singer and model of Pakistani and Bosnian origins.

She became an icon of passive resistance in 2017 after being photographed facing a member of the English Defence League (EDL), a far-right group, during an anti-Muslim demonstration in Birmingham.

In 2019, she appeared on the Encore album, by the British ska band the Specials.

In March 2019, Saffiyah joined the Specials on their tour across Europe and North America.

== Biography ==
Khan is from Birmingham, West Midlands, and is of Pakistani and Bosnian origins.

On 8 April 2017, aged 20, she was photographed standing up to Ian Crossland, the leader of the English Defence League (EDL), a far-right group, during an anti-Muslim demonstration organised in Birmingham the day after the Westminster attack. Having come to observe the demonstration in order to support the “people they harass and attack”, Saffiyah Khan stepped in to protect a veiled woman, Saira Zafar, who was being harassed by several demonstrators.

The photograph, taken by Joe Giddens, of the Press Association agency was relayed by many British media including The Guardian, The Daily Telegraph, The Daily Mirror and the BBC before the story took on an international dimension. It resonates with other shots illustrating recent resistance movements. On 1 May 2016 Simon Lindberg photographed Tess Asplund facing neo-Nazis in Borlänge, Sweden. Three months later, Jonathan Bachman captured Ieshia Evans face-to-face with police during a Black Lives Matter protest in Baton Rouge, Louisiana.

=== Music ===
Khan was noticed by members of the Specials because she was wearing one of their T-shirts in the images shot the day of the demonstration. She was invited by singer Lynval Golding to one of their upcoming concerts. In 2019, she participated in the album Encore, performing a revised version of Prince Buster's 1965 hit "Ten Commandments of Man".

She performed the track with the band at London's 100 Club in February 2019, subsequently touring with, and DJing for, the band.

=== Modelling ===
In the spring of 2017, Khan took her first steps on the catwalk during the fashion show of Turkish designer Dilara Fındıkoğlu. She then engaged with the modeling agency Elite and its Collective division which represents talents rather than professional models.
