= Anouchka Grose =

British-Australian psychoanalyst, writer, and musician (born 1970)

- Born: 1970 (age 55–56); Sydney, Australia
- Education: Goldsmiths' College
- Occupations: Psychoanalyst; writer; musician
- Musical career
- Formerly of: Terry, Blair & Anouchka
- Website: anouchkagrose.com

Anouchka Grose (born 1970 in Sydney, Australia) is a British-Australian Lacanian psychoanalyst and writer.

== Careers ==
Before training as a psychoanalyst, she studied Fine Art at Goldsmiths' College and was a guitarist and backing vocalist with Terry, Blair & Anouchka (with Terry Hall of The Specials). She played lap steel guitar with Martin Creed's band between 2009 and 2017.

She has written about numerous artists, including Clare Woods, Joanna Piotrowska, Martin Creed and Sophy Rickett, and has worked with the French-British artist Alice Anderson, writing about her work, interviewing her, and composing and performing music for her film, The Night I Became a Doll. Her journalism has been published by The Guardian, and The Independent, and her short stories have appeared in Granta magazine and The Erotic Review.

She is a member of The Centre for Freudian Analysis and Research, where she lectures. She also discusses psychoanalysis and current affairs on the radio, appearing on Moral Maze, Broadcasting House, Woman's Hour and "Beyond Belief", as well as presenting an episode of Radio 4's Lent Talks on "Destiny and the Psyche" in 2017.

== Books ==
- The Hair Book, Hutchinson 1990
- The Teenage Vegetarian Survival Guide, Red Fox 1992
- Ringing For You, Flamingo 1999
- Darling Daisy, Flamingo 2000
- No More Silly Love Songs, Portobello Books 2010 Published in America under the title Why Do Fools Fall in Love, Tin House 2011
- Are You Considering Therapy?, Karnac Books 2011
- Jack Webb Suspects his Parents (essay), Dashwood Books 2011
- Hysteria Today, (editor) Karnac 2016
- From Anxiety to Zoolander: notes on psychoanalysis, Karnac 2018
- A Guide to Eco-anxiety: how to protect the planet and your mental health, Watkins 2020
- FASHION: A Manifesto, Notting Hill Editions, 2023
- The Revolution Will Be Internalised: on the unlikely politics of inner prepping, Indigo 2026

== Records ==
Terry, Blair & Anouchka released two singles before their debut and only album:

- Ultra Modern Nursery Rhymes, Chrysalis Records, 1990
