= The Colourfield =

British band formed in 1984

- Origin: Coventry / Manchester, England
- Genres: New wave, pop rock
- Years active: 1984–1987
- Label: Chrysalis
- Past members: Terry Hall; Toby Lyons; Karl Shale

The Colourfield (initially The Colour Field, spelt in one word from 1987 onwards) were an English band formed in 1984 in Manchester, England when former Specials and Fun Boy Three frontman Terry Hall joined up with Karl Shale and ex-Swinging Cats member Toby Lyons. Despite all three members being from Coventry, the band was based in Manchester.

== History ==
=== 1984 – The Beginning ===
In January 1984, the Colour Field released their first single "The Colour Field", which just missed making the top 40 in the UK Singles Chart. In the summer of the same year, they released "Take" as their second single, which commercially performed less well. Their third single was "Thinking of You", released in January 1985, which reached number 12 in the UK chart, and featured Katrina Phillips accompanying Hall on vocals. Their fourth single, released days before their debut album came out, was "Castles in the Air", which reached the lower reaches of the UK chart.

=== 1985 – Virgins and Philistines ===
When Virgins and Philistines was initially released in April 1985, it contained 12 tracks in the U.S. release and 10 in the UK version – but can now be found with 20 tracks as a Japanese re-release, containing many B-sides and live tracks. It failed to gain a large audience due to difficulty in marketing an album with such a diverse sound—it mixes 1960s and early 1970s pop music with more acoustic-based melodies and string arrangements. Virgins and Philistines often is regarded as the direct musical predecessor to the later work of other northern bands the Beautiful South and the Lightning Seeds in the 1990s; Hall later collaborated with the latter in a songwriting role and provided occasional vocals. Virgins and Philistines reached No. 12 in the UK Albums Chart.

Virgins and Philistines contained all original material except "The Hammond Song" (a cover of the Roches song), and—in the US—"Can't Get Enough of You Baby" (written by Linzer/Randell), which was the only track that received much airplay. The album was recorded at Strawberry Studios in Stockport and was produced by Hugh Jones and Jeremy Green, and engineered by Chris Jones. Additional personnel featured on the album included Pete de Freitas (Echo & the Bunnymen) on drums, Paul Burgess (ex-Camel, also drums), Preston Heyman (percussion), Ian Nelson (clarinet), Katrina Phillips (background vocals).

=== 1986 – The Colour Field (EP) ===
In January 1986, the Colour Field became a four-man group, adding Gary Dwyer (ex-The Teardrop Explodes) on drums. Around the same time, the band's U.S. label compiled a six track EP titled The Colour Field (sic) containing the new UK single and B-side "Things Could Be Beautiful" / "Frosty Morning" produced by Ian Broudie; two live tracks recorded at the Hammersmith Palais, "Pushing Up the Daisies" and "Yours Sincerely"; and two older tunes produced by Hugh Jones, "Armchair Theatre" and "Faint Hearts". "Things Could Be Beautiful" did not make the UK or U.S. charts, and it was another year before the public heard any new material.

=== 1987 – Deception ===
The band returned in the spring of 1987 as the Colourfield. They were now just a duo (Hall & Lyons) augmented by Raquel Welch's band and session musicians. Hall had to hire Welch's band after Lyons departed midway through the recording sessions. Hall has voiced his displeasure with the recording of Deception because he did not feel he had sufficient control of the session musicians and producers to be able to preserve the Colourfield's sound. Deception was produced by Richard Gottehrer and Jeffrey Lesser at Wool Hall Studio in Beckington, Somerset.

The first two singles released from Deception were both covers: "Running Away", originally by Sly & the Family Stone, and "She", a song composed by the songwriting duo of Tommy Boyce and Bobby Hart. "She" was released as a 12" and contained the additional track "Monkey in Winter" with lead vocals by Sinéad O'Connor.

Additional personnel featured included Gregg Mangiafico (keyboards); Sammy Merendino (drum programming); Roland Orzabal (Tears for Fears) (guitar on "Running Away" and "Confession"); Dolette McDonald; Deborah Malone and Janice Pendarvis (background vocals on "Digging It Deep"). Both Hall and Lyons appear on the interior cover of the album's CD re-release by Cherry Red Records in 2010 though Hall and his sessioners recorded significant sections of the finished album.

=== After the Colourfield ===
Hall undertook many other projects since the Colourfield. In 1990, he formed Terry, Blair & Anouchka, who released the album Ultra Modern Nursery Rhymes. In 1992 he collaborated with Dave Stewart (Eurythmics) under the name Vegas. In 1995 he released his first solo album Home. He worked with the Lightning Seeds, Stephen Duffy, Gorillaz, and Tricky. He also appeared live with the Ordinary Boys.

On 21 July 2003, Hall released his album The Hour of Two Lights, a collaboration with Mushtaq (Fun-Da-Mental). In 2009, he embarked on a well-received reunion tour with the original line-up of the Specials, but without Jerry Dammers, and had continued touring with the band since. Hall died on 18 December 2022 from pancreatic cancer at the age of 63. Lyons is now a university lecturer/tutor of graphic design at Sheffield Hallam University in South Yorkshire. Karl Shale joined the Candyskins. After they broke up, he worked in a record shop.

== Members ==
- Terry Hall – vocals, guitar (1984-1987)
- Toby Lyons – guitar, organ (1984-1987)
- Karl Shale – bass (1984-1986)
- Gary Dwyer – drums (1986)

== Discography ==
The Colourfield discography
- Studio albums: 2
- Extended plays: 1
- Compilation albums: 3
- Singles: 10

The discography of the Colourfield consists of two studio albums, one mini-album, two compilation albums and eleven singles.

=== Studio albums ===
Year	Album details	Chart Positions	
Year	Album details	UK Albums Chart	RIANZ]]
1985	Virgins and Philistines: Released: April 1985; Label: Chrysalis	12	28
1987	Deception: Released: March 1987; Label: Chrysalis	95	–

=== Compilation albums ===
- The Singles (Chrysalis, 1995) (compilation of Fun Boy Three and the Colourfield singles)
- The Very Best Of (Chrysalis, 2018)
- Sound of The Colourfield (Chrysalis, 2026)

=== EPs ===
- The Colour Field (Chrysalis, January 1986)

=== Singles ===
Non-UK singles are marked in brackets.

Year	Title	Album	Chart Positions	
Year	Title	Album	UK Singles Chart	Irish Singles Chart
1984	"The Colour Field"	—	43	–
1984	"Take"	Virgins and Philistines	70	–
1985	"Thinking of You"	Virgins and Philistines	12	11
1985	"Castles in the Air"	Virgins and Philistines	51	–
1985	"Yours Sincerely" (FR)	Virgins and Philistines	N/R	–
1985	"Can't Get Enough of You Baby" (U.S. and CA)	—	N/R	–
1986	"Things Could Be Beautiful"	—	83	–
1987	"The Windmills of Your Mind" (JP)	—	N/R	–
1987	"Running Away"	Deception	84	–
1987	"Goodbye Sun Valley" (FR)	Deception	N/R	–
1987	"She"	Deception	–	–
