= Deep Sea Skiving =

Studio album by Bananarama
- Released: 9 March 1983
- Studios: Red Bus (Marylebone); Utopia (Primrose Hill)
- Genres: New wave; synth-pop; post-punk
- Length: 37:57
- Label: London
- Producers: Steve Jolley; Tony Swain; Barry Blue; Paul Cook; John Martin; Sara Dallin; Dave Jordan

Bananarama chronology
Deep Sea Skiving (1983)	Bananarama (1984)

Singles from Deep Sea Skiving
- 1. "Aie a Mwana" Released: 28 September 1981; 2. "Really Saying Something" Released: 29 March 1982; 3. "Shy Boy" Released: 18 June 1982; 4. "Cheers Then" Released: 19 November 1982; 5. "He's Got Tact" Released: 1982 (Japan only); 6. "Na Na Hey Hey Kiss Him Goodbye" Released: 14 February 1983

Deep Sea Skiving is the debut studio album by the English pop group Bananarama, released on 9 March 1983 by London Records.

The album peaked at number seven on the UK Albums Chart and was certified silver by the British Phonographic Industry (BPI).

== Background and recording ==
By the time they began working on a full-length album, Bananarama had recorded and released two singles, "Aie a Mwana" and "Really Saying Something", which were both subsequently included on Deep Sea Skiving. After hearing the Imagination song "Body Talk" (1981) and being impressed by its "slinky" sound, Bananarama sought to work on their debut album with the song's producers, Jolley & Swain. On their first meeting with the group at Red Bus Studios in Marylebone, Jolley & Swain presented Bananarama with a song in the vein of Motown girl groups called "Big Red Motorbike", which after being rewritten at the behest of the group, who disliked its lyrics, would become "Shy Boy". After recording two more tracks, "Na Na Hey Hey Kiss Him Goodbye" and "Boy Trouble", with Jolley & Swain producing, Bananarama recorded the rest of Deep Sea Skiving at Utopia Studios in Primrose Hill with producer Barry Blue.

Bananarama member Siobhan Fahey attributed the change in producers to the group's desire to record more of their own compositions, explaining, "[Jolley & Swain] wanted us to do their songs, not ours. They wanted a 1980s version of the old girl groups, disembodied voices. They didn't see us as voices with ideas." The duo would nonetheless be brought back as producers for Bananarama's next two studio albums, Bananarama (1984) and True Confessions (1986), and group members Sara Dallin and Keren Woodward later acknowledged Jolley & Swain's role in helping the group hone their songwriting and arrangement skills during the Deep Sea Skiving sessions.

Writing about Deep Sea Skiving in 1983, Los Angeles Times critic Terry Atkinson said that Bananarama "mix the old Motown/Spector 'girl group' approach with the modern African rhythms and new-wave effervescence that were popularized, in part, by the female-led Bow Wow Wow." Stereogum's Robbie Daw later wrote that the album "stood out as a synth-pop and 1960s girl group hybrid", while Classic Pop's Mark Lindores described its sound as "falling somewhere between the Slits and the Supremes" and noted that Bananarama "blended the notion of the classic girl groups of the 60s and the DIY ethos of the punk scene that spawned them".

== Release ==
Deep Sea Skiving was released on 9 March 1983 by London Records, reaching number seven on the UK Albums Chart. "Aie a Mwana" had previously been issued in 1981 as a one-off release by Bananarama for the independent label Demon Records, while "Really Saying Something" followed in 1982 and became the group's first major hit as a lead artist, peaking at number five on the UK singles chart. Three further singles were released from Deep Sea Skiving: "Shy Boy", "Cheers Then", and "Na Na Hey Hey Kiss Him Goodbye". While "Cheers Then" charted at a relatively low number 45, "Shy Boy" and "Na Na Hey Hey Kiss Him Goodbye" gave Bananarama two further UK top five singles, reaching numbers four and five respectively. The Japanese edition of the album included an additional track, "He's Got Tact", which was recorded by the group for a Honda advert and issued as a single in Japan.

The sleeve artwork for Deep Sea Skiving was designed by Peter Barrett, while the cover photograph of Bananarama was taken by Bay Hippisley, who also constructed the underwater-themed set. The black tunics worn by Bananarama on the cover were sewn by the group members themselves. According to Barrett, the full image showed the group in what was intended to look like a "giant fish tank with them swimming inside with their fish. However, when the key image came back, the metal looking tank frame looked murky so I stripped it away to a white border which contrasted better with the colourful image." The inner sleeve contains numerous photos of the group members, several of them in childhood.

As part of a reissue series covering Bananarama's first six studio albums, Deep Sea Skiving was re-released on CD on 19 March 2007 by Rhino Records with several bonus tracks. The six albums were reissued again by Edsel Records on 28 October 2013, each as a double-CD set with an accompanying DVD. The London label reissued the albums on CD on 20 July 2018, and on coloured vinyl and cassette on 30 November 2018.

== Critical reception ==
Professional ratings
Review scores
Source	Rating
AllMusic	4.5/5 stars
The Baltimore Sun	4/5 stars
Classic Pop	3/5 stars
The Philadelphia Inquirer	4/5 stars
Record Mirror	3/5 stars
Rolling Stone	4/5 stars
Smash Hits	4/10
Spin Alternative Record Guide	8/10
Stylus Magazine	A
The Village Voice	B−

Writing for Rolling Stone, Chris Connelly praised Deep Sea Skiving as sounding "like a great party" even without overt "conviction" or "soul", and commented, "Bananarama aren't the type to sing 'Come See About Me': they're hot stuff, they know it, and if you don't, that's your problem." Observing "a lot of promise here", Record Mirror's Jim Reid highlighted Bananarama's "charm and vivacity" and complimented their self-penned songs, while suggesting that their craft would improve over time through "extensive live work and a more considered stab at songwriting". Beverley Hillier of Smash Hits, however, said that "their identity is totally overshadowed by that of the different producers and songwriters ... while their vocals are dull and monotonous."

In a retrospective review, AllMusic critic Stewart Mason deemed Deep Sea Skiving "Bananarama's finest album by far, and an underappreciated pop gem of its era", writing that the group "were unashamedly poppy, but they had enough artistic credibility to create a debut album that, barring a couple of small missteps, actually works as an album instead of a collection of singles with some filler." Record Collector's Rob Hughes described it as an album of "mischievous post-punk pop" which "scrambled preconceived ideas of what an all-girl band could be: post-punks with a pop vision and strong DIY aesthetic."

== Track listing ==
Standard edition
No.	Title	Writer(s)	Producer(s)	Length
1.	"Shy Boy"	Steve Jolley; Tony Swain	Jolley; Swain	3:16
2.	"Doctor Love"	Paul Weller	Barry Blue	3:42
3.	"What a Shambles"	Sara Dallin; Siobhan Fahey; Keren Woodward; Terry Sharpe	Blue	3:34
4.	"Really Saying Something"	Norman Whitfield; Edward Holland Jr.; William "Mickey" Stevenson	Dave Jordan	2:45
5.	"Cheers Then"	Dallin; Fahey; Woodward; Sharpe; John Martin	Blue	3:31
6.	"Aie a Mwana"	Jean Kluger; Daniel Vangarde	Paul Cook; Martin; Dallin	3:36
7.	"Young at Heart"	Dallin; Fahey; Woodward; Robert Hodgens	Blue	3:13
8.	"Na Na Hey Hey Kiss Him Goodbye"	Gary DeCarlo; Dale Frashuer; Paul Leka	Jolley; Swain	3:30
9.	"Hey Young London"	Blue; Stan Shaw; Dallin; Fahey; Woodward	Blue	3:55
10.	"Boy Trouble"	Dallin; Fahey; Woodward	Jolley; Swain	3:14
11.	"Wish You Were Here"	Dallin; Fahey; Woodward	Blue	3:41
Total length:				37:57

Japanese edition bonus track
No.	Title	Writer(s)	Length
4.	"He's Got Tact"	Dallin; Fahey; Woodward	2:57
Total length:			40:54

Notes

- The original US LP edition omits "Aie a Mwana" and has a slightly altered running order.
- The original Japanese LP edition positions "He's Got Tact" between "What a Shambles" and "Really Saying Something".

2007 CD reissue bonus tracks
No.	Title	Writer(s)	Length
12.	"Give Us Back Our Cheap Fares"	Dallin; Fahey; Woodward; Vaughn Cotillard	4:24
13.	"Girl About Town"	Dallin; Fahey; Woodward	3:28
14.	"He's Got Tact"	Dallin; Fahey; Woodward	2:57
15.	"Tell Tale Signs"	Dallin; Fahey; Woodward	3:08
16.	"No Feelings"	Paul Cook; Steve Jones; Glen Matlock; Johnny Rotten	2:33

Notes

- The version of "Give Us Back Our Cheap Fares" used is the extended version.
- The version of "Girl About Town" used is a slightly longer version, with an additional four bars just before the instrumental break (roughly 1:45–1:59), than the original vinyl 7" version (3:10).

2013 deluxe edition CD/DVD reissue – Disc one bonus tracks
No.	Title	Length
12.	"He's Got Tact"	2:59
13.	"Girl About Town"	3:13
14.	"Tell Tale Signs"	3:15
15.	"No Feelings"	2:33
16.	"Aie a Mwana" (extended version)	5:45
17.	"Really Saying Something" (extended version)	5:39
18.	"Shy Boy" (12" mix)	5:50
19.	"Cheers Then" (extended version)	5:18
20.	"Na Na Hey Hey (Kiss Him Goodbye)" (12" version)	4:52

2013 deluxe edition CD/DVD reissue – Disc two
No.	Title	Length
1.	"Aie a Mwana" (7" version)	3:48
2.	"Really Saying Something" (U.S. 7" mix)	3:46
3.	"Shy Boy" (U.S. 7" mix)	3:35
4.	"No Feelings" (alternative mix)	2:35
5.	"Give Us Back Our Cheap Fares"	2:45
6.	"Boy Trouble" (extended version)	4:20
7.	"Girl About Town" (extended version)	5:31
8.	"Tell Tale Signs" (extended version)	4:45
9.	"Aie a Mwana" (U.S. extended version)	6:45
10.	"Really Saying Something" (U.S. extended version)	7:54
11.	"Shy Boy" (U.S. extended version)	7:20
12.	"Give Us Back Our Cheap Fares" (extended version)	4:23
13.	"Aie a Mwana" (U.S. dub)	4:38
14.	"Shy Boy" (U.S. dub)	9:23
15.	"Na Na Hey Hey (Kiss Him Goodbye) (Na (Dub) Hey)"	4:12
16.	"Aie a Mwana (Dubwana)"	3:40

2013 deluxe edition CD/DVD reissue – DVD

1. "Really Saying Something" – music video (directed by Midge Ure and Chris Cross)
2. "Shy Boy" – music video (directed by Midge Ure and Chris Cross)
3. "Cheers Then" – music video (directed by Keith "Keef" MacMillan)
4. "Na Na Hey Hey (Kiss Him Goodbye)" – music video (directed by Keith "Keef" MacMillan)
5. "Really Saying Something" – performance on Top of the Pops
6. "Shy Boy" – performance on 6.55 Special
7. "Boy Trouble" – performance on 6.55 Special
8. "Na Na Hey Hey (Kiss Him Goodbye)" – performance on Saturday Superstore

== Personnel ==
Credits are adapted from the album's liner notes.

Bananarama

- Sara Dallin – vocals
- Siobhan Fahey – vocals
- Keren Woodward – vocals

Production

- Barry Blue – production
- Paul Cook (credited as "Little Paul Cook") – production
- Sara Dallin – production
- Steve Jolley – production
- Dave Jordan – production
- John Luongo – remixing ("Aie a Mwana")
- John Mackswith – engineering
- John Martin (credited as "Big John Martin") – production, piano arrangement ("Young at Heart")
- Squid Palmer – engineering (assistance)
- Tony Swain – production

Design

- Peter Barrett – design
- Bay Hippisley – photography

== Charts ==
Chart (1983)	Peak position
Australian Albums (Kent Music Report)	85
Canada Top Albums/CDs (RPM)	48
French Albums (SNEP)	22
UK Albums (OCC)	7
US Billboard 200	63

== Certifications ==
Region	Certification	Certified units/sales
United Kingdom (BPI)	Silver	60,000^{^}
^{^} Shipments figures based on certification alone.
