= Ultra Modern Nursery Rhymes =

Studio album by Terry, Blair & Anouchka
- Released: February 1990
- Genre: Pop
- Label: Chrysalis
- Producer: Bob Sargeant, Jeremy Green

Terry Hall chronology
Deception by The Colourfield (1988)	Ultra Modern Nursery Rhymes (1990)	Vegas (1992)

Ultra Modern Nursery Rhymes is the only album released by the short-lived group Terry, Blair & Anouchka.

== Overview ==
Terry, Blair & Anouchka were formed shortly after the dissolution of Terry's previous musical project the Colourfield. All three members shared a love for '60s pop, as well as kitschy mainstream pop, as evidenced on the trio's cover of Captain & Tennille's "Love Will Keep Us Together". "Missing" was released as a single in November 1989, followed by "Ultra Modern Nursery Rhyme" in February 1990. Both singles reached the lower end of the UK Singles Chart. Ultra Modern Nursery Rhymes was released in February 1990 to little attention. The group split shortly afterwards.

== Release ==
The album did not chart in the UK. "Missing" reached No. 75 in November 1989, and "Ultra Modern Nursery Rhyme", the second and final single charted at No. 77 the following year. The album was re-released in 2004 by Cherry Red Records with two additional bonus tracks.

== Track listing ==
All tracks are written by Terry Hall and Blair Booth; except as indicated.

Side one
No.	Title	Length
1.	"Ultra Modern Nursery Rhyme"	4:05
2.	"Missing"	4:40
3.	"Fishbones and Scaredy Cats"	4:26
4.	"Lucky in Luv'"	3:39
5.	"Day Like Today"	3:17

Side two
No.	Title	Writer(s)	Length
6.	"Sweet September Sacrifice"		4:40
7.	"Beautiful People"		4:19
8.	"Three Cool Catz"	Jerry Leiber, Mike Stoller	2:28
9.	"Happy Families"		3:20
10.	"Just Go"		4:19

Bonus tracks
No.	Title	Writer(s)	Length
11.	"Hush Hush Balooo"		3:37
12.	"Love Will Keep Us Together"	Howard Greenfield, Neil Sedaka	3:33

== Personnel ==
Terry, Blair & Anouchka

- Blair Booth - keyboards, vocals
- Anouchka Grose - guitar, backing vocals
- Terry Hall - vocals

Technical

- Jeremy Green - arrangements
- Bob Sargeant - producer on tracks 1 to 7, 9, 10
- Jeremy Green - producer on tracks 4 to 6, 8, 9
