= Virgins and Philistines =

Studio album by The Colour Field
- Released: April 1985
- Recorded: 1984−1985
- Studios: Strawberry Studios, Stockport
- Genres: New wave, rock, alternative rock
- Length: 43:58 (North America LP version)
- Label: Chrysalis
- Producers: Hugh Jones, Jeremy Green

The Colour Field chronology
Waiting by Fun Boy Three (1983)	Virgins and Philistines (1985)	The Colour Field (1986)

Singles from Virgins and Philistines
- 1. "Take" b/w "Pushing Up The Daisies" Released: July 1984; 2. "Thinking of You" b/w "My Wild Flame" Released: January 1985; 3. "Castles in the Air" b/w "Your Love Was Smashing" Released: April 1985

Professional ratings
Review scores
Source	Rating
AllMusic	4.5/5 stars

Virgins and Philistines is the debut album by British new wave band the Colour Field.

== Overview ==
Virgins and Philistines failed to gain a large audience due to difficulty in marketing an album with such a diverse sound—it mixes 1960s and early 1970s pop music with more acoustic based melodies and string arrangements. The album is often regarded as the direct musical predecessor to the later work of the Lightning Seeds in the 1990s, with whom singer Terry Hall would later collaborate in a songwriting role whilst providing occasional vocals.

Virgins and Philistines contained all original material except "The Hammond Song" (a cover of the Roches song), and "Can't Get Enough of You Baby" (written by Linzer/Randell and originally recorded by ? & the Mysterians), which was the only track that received much airplay. The album was recorded at Strawberry Studios in Stockport (near Manchester) and was produced by Hugh Jones and Jeremy Green, and engineered by Chris Jones.

Additional personnel featured on the album included Pete de Freitas (Echo & the Bunnymen) on drums, Paul Burgess (ex-Camel, also drums), Preston Heyman (percussion), Ian Nelson (clarinet), and Katrina Phillips (background vocals).

== Release ==
Virgins and Philistines was released in April 1985 over a year after the group's first release. It charted at #12 on the UK Albums Chart and #28 on the New Zealand Album chart. It was preceded by three singles. The first, "Take", did not chart as highly as their début and only made #70 in the UK. The second single, "Thinking of You", was much better received and returned Hall to the top forty in the UK and Ireland, reaching #12 and #11 respectively. "Castles in the Air" was the final single and directly preceded the album, but it only managed #51.

The album was released in the US with different track listing including the band's self-titled début single. It also added the B-sides "I Can't Get Enough of You Baby", "Pushing Up the Daisies" and "Your Love Was Smashing". "Armchair Theatre" and "Yours Sincerely" were not included, but were later released in the US on the EP; The Colour Field.

The album was released in Canada with the same track order as the US release. Faint Hearts is a shorter 3:58 minute version that excludes the 20 second slow vocal introduction. Another notable difference is the song titles: "I Can't Get Enough of You Baby" appears as "Can't Get Enough of You Baby" and "The Colour Field" is listed as "The Colourfield".

In 1999, the album was re-released in Japan with twenty tracks, including all of the songs on the UK and US versions of the album plus all of the singles, B-Sides and remixes that were released before and immediately after the original release of Virgins and Philistines.

In 2010, the album was reissued once again, this new version was released by Cherry Red and it included most of the bonus tracks of the 1999 version.

== Track listing ==
All tracks written by Terry Hall and Toby Lyons, except as indicated.

Side one
No.	Title	Length
1.	"Thinking of You"	3:32
2.	"Faint Hearts"	4:20
3.	"Castles in the Air"	3:43
4.	"Take"	4:09
5.	"Cruel Circus"	4:02

Side two
No.	Title	Writer(s)	Length
6.	"Hammond Song"	Margaret Roche	4:29
7.	"Virgins and Philistines"		3:56
8.	"Yours Sincerely"		3:41
9.	"Armchair Theatre"		5:02
10.	"Sorry"		3:19

Japanese edition bonus tracks
No.	Title	Writer(s)	Length
11.	"The Colour Field"		2:55
12.	"Windmills of Your Mind"	Alan Bergman, Marilyn Bergman, Michel Legrand	3:00
13.	"Pushing Up the Daisies"		4:06
14.	"Thinking of You" (Singalong Version)		3:31
15.	"My Wild Flame"		4:20
16.	"Little Things"	Bobby Goldsboro	2:31
17.	"Castles in the Air" (Extended Version)		5:06
18.	"Your Love Was Smashing"	Terry Hall, Toby Lyons, Karl Shale	3:55
19.	"Can't Get Enough of You Baby"	Denny Randell, Sandy Linzer	2:21
20.	"Things Could Be So Beautiful"		3:24

=== US version ===
Side one
No.	Title	Writer(s)	Length
1.	"I Can't Get Enough of You Baby"	Denny Randell, Sandy Linzer	2:21
2.	"Pushing Up the Daisies"		4:06
3.	"Faint Hearts"		4:20
4.	"Castles in the Air"		3:43
5.	"Take"		4:09
6.	"Thinking of You"		3:32

Side two
No.	Title	Writer(s)	Length
7.	"The Colour Field"		2:55
8.	"Cruel Circus"		4:02
9.	"Hammond Song"	Margaret Roche	4:29
10.	"Your Love Was Smashing"	Terry Hall, Toby Lyons, Karl Shale	3:55
11.	"Virgins and Philistines"		3:56
12.	"Sorry"		3:19

== Personnel ==
The Colour Field

- Terry Hall - all instruments and voices
- Toby Lyons - all instruments and voices
- Karl Shale - all instruments and voices

Additional musicians

- Paul Burgess - drums
- Pete de Freitas - drums on "Take" and "Cruel Circus"
- Katrina Phillips - backing vocals on "Thinking of You"
- Ian Nelson - clarinet on "Virgins and Philistines"
- Preston Heyman - percussion
