= Cheers Then =

Single by Bananarama

from the album Deep Sea Skiving
- B-side: "Girl About Town"
- Released: 22 November 1982
- Recorded: 1982
- Genre: Pop; new wave
- Length: 3:31
- Label: London Records
- Songwriters: Sara Dallin; Siobhan Fahey; John Martin; Terry Sharp; Keren Woodward
- Producer: Barry Blue

Bananarama singles chronology
"Shy Boy" (1982)	"Cheers Then" (1982)	"Na Na Hey Hey Kiss Him Goodbye" (1983)

"Cheers Then" is a song recorded by the English girl group Bananarama. It appears on their 1983 debut album Deep Sea Skiving and was released as its third single in November 1982, a few months before the album. The song was the first Bananarama single to be written by group members Sara Dallin, Siobhan Fahey and Keren Woodward and also their first ballad release.

Coming off three consecutive top-ten hits, "Cheers Then" peaked at a disappointing number forty-five in the UK singles chart. Fahey said in a 1986 interview about this song, "We started taking our careers seriously after 'Cheers Then' bombed. Before then we thought all groups just brought out records and had them go to the top of the charts. It brought us down to reality a bit."

Even with its relatively low sales, the song is regarded by critics as one of Bananarama's best recordings. The group's fortunes would rebound, however, with their UK follow-up single, a cover version of Steam's "Na Na Hey Hey Kiss Him Goodbye".

The B-side, "Girl About Town," has been issued on CD for the first time on the 2007 UK reissue of Deep Sea Skiving as one of five bonus tracks. However the version used is a slightly longer version (3:31) with an additional 4 bars just before the instrumental break (roughly 1:45 - 1:59).

== Cover ==
The single's cover shows cartoons of Dallin, Fahey and Woodward perched atop a graffiti-covered wall. Adrian Gurvitz's name is visible on the top left corner of the wall.

== Music video ==
The music video directed by Keith McMillan was a recreation of the musical film The Sound of Music. Filmed in Salzburg, the girls re-enact many of the scenes from the film, including the step-jumping scene for "Do-Re-Mi" and running in the hills, and the gazebo scene.

== Critical reception ==
Writing for New Musical Express in November 1982, music critic Adrian Thrills evaluated "Cheers Then" as a pivotal milestone in Bananarama's career, marking their transition toward artistic independence. Thrills noted that the single demonstrated the trio's efforts to move past being viewed merely as "pretty puppets of some production team" and establish themselves as an act "deserving some sort of serious critical appraisal." Although Thrills considered the track "far from the strongest single" among the week's new releases, he praised its lyrical substance, describing it as a "winsome account of how a once solid friendship lapses into polite indifference." He also drew stylistic parallels between the song and "Don't Call Us," the B-side to their previous single "Shy Boy". Ultimately, Thrills commended the group for distancing themselves from the "novelty girlie appeal" of contemporary pop acts, concluding that Bananarama deserved credit because they "have never pretended to be anything other than themselves."

== Versions ==
7" vinyl single

London Records NANA 3

1. "Cheers Then" 3:29
2. "Girl About Town" 3:10

12" vinyl single

London Records NANX 3

1. "Cheers Then" (Extended Version) 5:19
2. "Girl About Town" (Extended Version) 5:31
  S. Dallin/S. Fahey/K. Woodward

== Charts ==
Chart (1982)	Peak position
UK Singles Chart	45
