= Fun Boy Three (album) =

The Fun Boy Three

Studio album by The Fun Boy Three
- Released: March 1982
- Studios: The Bridge, London
- Genres: New wave; pop
- Length: 32:53
- Label: Chrysalis
- Producers: Dave Jordan; The Fun Boy Three

The Fun Boy Three chronology
The Fun Boy Three (1982)	Waiting (1983)

Singles from The Fun Boy Three
- 1. "The Lunatics (Have Taken Over the Asylum)" Released: 1981; 2. "'It Ain't What You Do (It's the Way That You Do It)" Released: 1982

The Fun Boy Three is the debut album by English new wave pop band the Fun Boy Three, a band consisting of three ex-members of the UK ska band the Specials: Terry Hall, Neville Staples and Lynval Golding. It was released in 1982 by Chrysalis Records and was re-released in 1999 by EMI as Fame. Several songs on the album feature backing vocals by the female pop trio Bananarama. Three singles were released from the album: "The Lunatics (Have Taken Over the Asylum)", "It Ain’t What You Do (It's the Way That You Do It)", and a remix (with overdubbed horns) of "The Telephone Always Rings".

"The Lunatics (Have Taken Over the Asylum)" reached No. 20 in the UK Singles Chart in November 1981 and spent 12 weeks in the Top 100. "It Ain't What You Do (It's the Way That You Do It)" reached No. 4 and spent 7 weeks in the Top 40.

== Critical reception ==
Professional ratings
Review scores
Source	Rating
AllMusic	4.5/5 stars
The Daily Telegraph	3/5 stars
Pitchfork	8.4/10
Record Collector	4/5 stars
Record Mirror	4/5 stars
Rolling Stone	3/5 stars
Sounds	4.5/5 stars
The Village Voice	B

Record Mirror critic Mike Nicholls praised The Fun Boy Three as "a fabulous example of inspired amateurism at its best" and said that the band, "working in the same way as similarly unschooled Jamaican reggae stylists", had made an album that functions as "quality, unusual background music as well as a collection of original, often dryly humorous, stirring songs." "Taken in its role as a competitor against the present pop vanguard of Haircut, League and company," wrote Robbi Millar in Sounds, "The Fun Boy Three makes all the right moves in all the right places". Complimenting the album's "understatement", Millar concluded, "From Dave Jordan's production right through to the sturdy subject matter involved, it's a simple record. Simple and straight to the point. But, then again, it ain't what you do ..."

In a retrospective review for AllMusic, Jo-Ann Greene highlighted the minimalist sound of The Fun Boy Three, writing, "Many of the songs were stripped down to bare vocals and percussion, while even those tracks which did sport other instruments mostly utilized them as mere embellishments around the showcased rhythms. Long before modern rap and techno placed all its focus on the beats, the Boys were diligently working around this same concept ... It says much about the state of the British music scene of the time that such innovative music was not only accepted, but reveled in." Shaad D'Souza of Pitchfork described the album as having a "mysterious electro-pop sound haunted by the racist violence entrenched in British history" and commented that it "still sounds as mischievous and enigmatic as it likely did upon release. Its status as a relatively forgotten cultural artifact only adds to its mystique: This album of Gregorian-style chants and absurdist one-liners made for an entirely unexpected entrant to the UK Top 10."

== Track listing ==
All songs by Lynval Golding, Terry Hall and Neville Staples, except where noted.

Side one

1. "Sanctuary" (with Bananarama) – 1:21
2. "Way on Down" – 2:54
3. "The Lunatics (Have Taken Over the Asylum)" – 3:14
4. "Life in General (Lewe in Algemeen)" – 3:19
5. "Faith, Hope and Charity" – 2:48
6. "Funrama 2" (with Bananarama) – 3:08

Side two

7. "Best of Luck Mate" – 3:19
8. "It Ain’t What You Do (It's the Way That You Do It)" (with Bananarama; written by Melvin "Sy" Oliver and James "Trummy" Young) – 2:53
9. "The Telephone Always Rings" – 3:39
10. "I Don't Believe It" – 3:26
11. "Alone" (with Bananarama) – 3:00

2009 extended version CD bonus tracks

12. "Just Do It" (with Bananarama) – 2:59
13. "The Funrama Theme" (extended version) – 6:03
14. "Summertime" (extended version) – 6:26
15. "Summer of '82" – 4:01
16. "The Telephone Always Rings" (extended version) – 5:34
17. "The Alibi (The Station's Full of Pipes)" – 2:49

== Personnel ==
Credits adapted from 2009 "extended version" liner notes.

The Fun Boy Three – all instruments and vocals

- Terry Hall
- Neville Staples
- Lynval Golding

Bananarama – featured vocals (tracks 1, 6, 8, 11)

- Siobhan Fahey
- Keren Woodward
- Sara Dallin

Additional musicians

- Dick Cuthell – the horn player
- Sean Carasov – on the telephone

Technical

- Dave Jordan – producer
- The Fun Boy Three – producers, arrangers
- Allan Ballard – cameraman
- John Teflon Sims – visual effects
- Frank Elton – screen illustrations
- Terry Day – cover colour effects

== Charts ==
Chart performance for Fun Boy Three
Chart (1982)	Peak position
Australian Albums (Kent Music Report)	84
Dutch Albums (MegaCharts)	10
New Zealand (RIANZ)	17
UK Albums (Official Charts Company)	7

== Certifications ==
Certifications for Fun Boy Three
Region	Certification	Certified units/sales
United Kingdom (BPI)	Gold	100,000^{^}
^{^} Shipments figures based on certification alone.
