= Encore (The Specials album) =

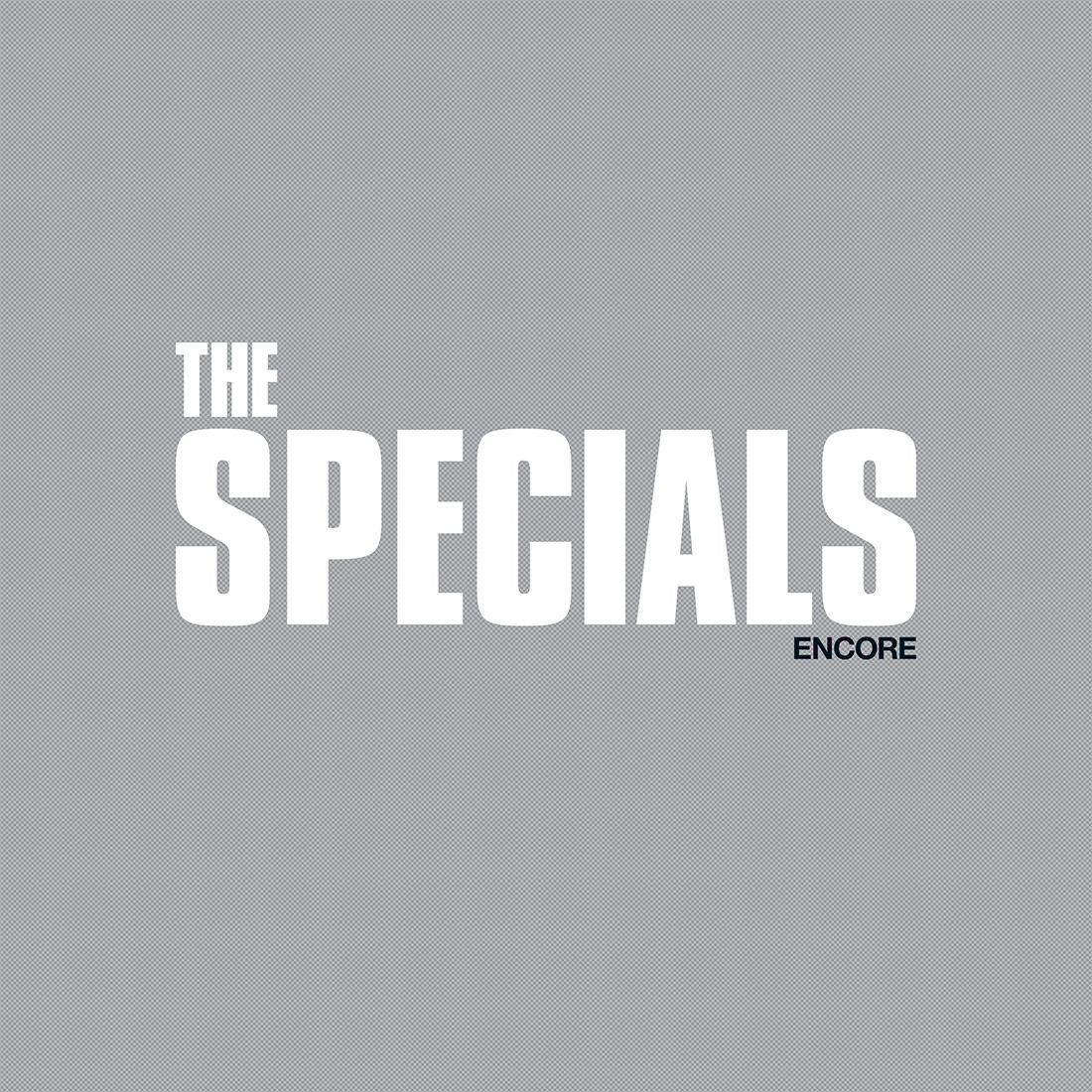

Studio album by the Specials
- Released: 1 February 2019
- Genre: Ska; disco; alternative rock
- Length: 40:39
- Label: Island; Universal
- Producer: Terry Hall; Lynval Golding; Horace Panter; Torp Larsen

The Specials chronology
More... Or Less: The Specials Live (2012)	Encore (2019)	Protest Songs 1924–2012 (2021)

Professional ratings
Aggregate scores
Source	Rating
Metacritic	74/100
Review scores
Source	Rating
AllMusic	3/5 stars
Clash	8/10
NME	4/5 stars
Paste	6.9/10
Rolling Stone	3.5/5 stars
Under the Radar	7/10

Encore is the eighth studio album by the English ska revival band the Specials. It is their first studio album of original songs since 1998's Guilty 'til Proved Innocent!, and their first new material with vocalist Terry Hall since 1981's "Ghost Town" single.

The album features three covers of older songs; "Black Skin Blue Eyed Boys" (originally by The Equals), "Blam Blam Fever" (originally by The Valentines) and "The Lunatics" (originally by Hall and Lynval Golding's group Fun Boy Three, released in 1981 as "The Lunatics (Have Taken Over the Asylum)"). The Specials, in a different incarnation, previously released a cover of "Blam Blam Fever" on 2000's studio album Skinhead Girl.

The track "10 Commandments" is a rebuttal to Prince Buster's "Ten Commandments", criticising the original's outdated representation of women. The track features a lead vocal from Saffiyah Khan, who came to prominence after being photographed challenging an English Defence League demonstration whilst wearing a Specials t-shirt.

Encore entered at number 1 on the UK Albums Chart after its first week of release, falling to 5 the week after and spending 9 weeks on the charts.

== Track listing ==
All tracks written by Terry Hall, Horace Panter, Lynval Golding, and Nikolaj Torp Larsen; except where indicated.

1. "Black Skin Blue Eyed Boys" (Eddy Grant) – 3:17
2. "B.L.M." – 5:05
3. "Vote for Me" – 5:01
4. "The Lunatics" (Neville Staple, Hall, Golding) – 3:35
5. "Breaking Point" – 3:56
6. "Blam Blam Fever" (Earl Grant, V. E. Grant) – 2:46
7. "10 Commandments" (Hall, Panter, Golding, Torp Larsen, Saffiyah Khan) – 3:53
8. "Embarrassed by You" (Hall, Panter, Golding, Torp Larsen, Mark Adams) – 3:05
9. "The Life and Times (Of a Man Called Depression)" – 5:27
10. "We Sell Hope" – 4:34

Deluxe version

A deluxe version was released including a CD of live recordings.

1. "Gangsters" (Horace Panter, Jerry Dammers, John Bradbury, Lynval Golding, Neville Staple, Rod Byers, Terry Hall) – 3:13
2. "A Message to You, Rudy" (Robert Thompson) – 2:51
3. "Nite Klub" (Horace Panter, Jerry Dammers, John Bradbury, Lynval Golding, Neville Staple, Rod Byers, Terry Hall) – 4:49
4. "Friday Night, Saturday Morning" (Terry Hall) – 3:16
5. "Stereotype" (Jerry Dammers) – 4:42
6. "Redemption Song" (Bob Marley) – 3:53
7. "Monkey Man" (Toots Hibbert) – 2:38
8. "Too Much Too Young" (Jerry Dammers) – 2:04
9. "Enjoy Yourself (It's Later Than You Think)" (Carl Sigman, Herb Magidson) – 3:33
10. "Ghost Town" (Jerry Dammers) – 5:40
11. "All The Time In The World" (Hal David, John Barry) – 3:25

Tracks 2–1, 2–2, 2–4, 2–5, 2–7, 2–9, 2–10 Recorded at Le Bataclan, Paris 30/11/2014

Tracks 2–3, 2–6, 2–8, 2–11 Recorded at The Troxy, London 16/11/2016

- Gary Powell – drums (London)
- John Bradbury – drums (Paris)

Stanford Quartet (Paris)

- Laura Stanford – violin
- Eleanor Stanford – violin
- Amy Stanford – viola
- Jessica Cox – cello

== Personnel ==
=== The Specials ===
- Terry Hall – vocals
- Lynval Golding – vocals, guitar
- Horace Panter – bass guitar

With

- Nikolaj Torp Larsen – keyboards, vocals
- Steve Cradock – guitar
- Kenrick Rowe – drums
- Tim Smart – trombone, tuba
- Pablo Mendelssohn – trumpet
- Saffiyah Khan – guest vocals (10 Commandments)

=== String quartet ===
- Ian Burdge – cello
- Bruce White – viola
- Oli Langford – violin
- Tom Pigott-Smith – violin

=== Technical ===
- George Murphy – engineering
- Sophie Ellis – engineering assistance
- Cenzo Townshend – mixing
- Robert Sellens – mixing assistance
- Frank Arkwright – master engineering

== Charts ==
=== Weekly charts ===
Chart (2019)	Peak position
Belgian Albums (Ultratop Flanders)	154
Belgian Albums (Ultratop Wallonia)	158
German Albums (Offizielle Top 100)	20
Irish Albums (IRMA)	10
Scottish Albums (OCC)	1
UK Albums (OCC)	1

=== Year-end charts ===
Chart (2019)	Position
UK Albums (OCC)	98
