= The Hour of Two Lights =

Studio album by Terry Hall and Mushtaq
- Released: 12 August 2003
- Genre: Electronic
- Length: 57:13
- Label: Honest Jon's, EMI (Europe), Astralwerks (US)
- Producer: Terry Hall; Mushtaq

Terry Hall chronology
Laugh (1997)	The Hour of Two Lights (2003)

Mushtaq chronology
The Hour of Two Lights (2003)

The Hour of Two Lights is a one-off collaborative album between British solo-artist Terry Hall, formerly of the 2 Tone and ska revival band the Specials, and Mushtaq, a member of British-based multi-ethnic hip-hop–ethno-techno–world fusion music group Fun-Da-Mental.

== Composition and release ==
The album was written and produced by the duo, with the exception of "Ten Eleven" which was written with Oujdi and Hall's regular collaborator and label-boss of Honest Jon's, Damon Albarn. Receiving good reviews, the album was released on CD and double-LP by Albarn's Honest Jon's label in Europe (distributed by EMI) and the US (distributed by Astralwerks) in August 2003.

It was Hall's last release of new material, after which he rejoined the Specials as a regular member for live performances, until the release of the Specials' album Encore in 2019.

== Critical response ==
Professional ratings
Review scores
Source	Rating
AllMusic	4/5 stars
BBC Music	(Positive)
The Guardian	4/5 stars
PopMatters	(Positive)
Uncut	4/5 stars

Robin Denselow of The Guardian rated it 4/5 and said of The Hour of Two Lights, "Two of the pioneers of multicultural British pop are back with a daring, thoughtful set..." Ollie Davies of BBC Music said, "It's a political and musical recording of racial minorities and cultures by two of today's pioneers of modern popular music." Sean Westergaard of AllMusic rated One and One Is One 3/5 and thought "Terry Hall took quite a chance on this one, doing something unlike anything in his catalog and pulling it off without a hitch. Well done."

Jeff Brown of CMJ New Music Monthly called it "...a fantastic mélange of East and West, traditional and modernmusic." Uncut rated it 4/5 and called it "...a fantastic record of banging global grooves..." PopMatters of Will Harris thought "The Hour of Two Lights can expand one's musical horizons considerably."

== Track listing ==
All lyrics are written by Terry Hall and Mushtaq except where indicated; all music is composed by Terry Hall and Mushtaq except where indicated.

No.	Title	Writer(s)	Length
1.	"Grow"		5:53
2.	"A Gathering Storm"		5:05
3.	"Ten Eleven"	Damon Albarn, Mushtaq, Oujdi, Hall	4:59
4.	"Sticks and Stones"		4:13
5.	"The Silent Wail"		7:08
6.	"A Tale of Woe"		4:22
7.	"The Hour of Two Lights"		5:55
8.	"This and That"		4:34
9.	"They Gotta Quit Kicking My Dog Around"		5:06
10.	"Stand Together"		4:46
11.	"Epilogue"		5:10

== Personnel ==
- Terry Hall – vocals, banjo, jaw-harp
- Mushtaq – darabuka, drums, keyboards, percussion

Additional musicians

- Damon Albarn – voice, melodica
- Louai Alhenawi – ney
- Abdul Latif Assaly – voice
- Nathalie Barghach – voice
- Sammy Bishai – violin
- Calum Cook – cello
- James Dring – recorder
- A.K.Durvesh – shehnai
- Numan Elyer – percussion
- Eva Katzler – voice
- Matthew Kent – scratch deejaying
- Hajaj Kenway – percussion
- Eddie Mordue – clarinet
- Oujdi – rap
- Herinderpal Panesar – dhol
- Romany Rad – accordion, bass, guitar, voice
- Zoe Rahman – piano
- Mazin Abu Sayf – oud, accordion

Technical

- Terry Hall – producer, mixing
- Mushtaq – producer, mixing
- Tom Girling – engineer, mixing
- James Dring – assistant engineer
- Will Bankhead – photography, design
- John Ainley – drawing
- Elizabeth Cook – drawing
- Len Wheeler – drawing
