= She (Charles Aznavour song) =

Original song written and composed by Charles Aznavour and Herbert Kretzmer

Single by Charles Aznavour
- B-side: "La barraka"
- Released: 14 June 1974
- Genre: Pop
- Length: 2:50
- Label: Barclay
- Songwriters: Charles Aznavour, Herbert Kretzmer

"She" is a song written by Charles Aznavour and Herbert Kretzmer and released as a single sung by Aznavour in 1974. The song was written in English as a theme tune for the British TV series Seven Faces of Woman.

Aznavour also recorded it in French, German, Italian and Spanish, under the titles "Tous les visages de l'amour" (English: All the Faces of Love), "Sie" (English: She) "Lei" (English: She) and "Es" (English: [She] is), respectively. He also recorded the song in a more uptempo French version with different lyrics, simply titled "Elle" (English: She).

The song peaked at number 1 on the UK Singles Chart and stayed there for four weeks; it was certified silver for shipments exceeding 300,000 units. It also reached number 1 in the Irish Charts, spending one week at the top. It was less popular outside the UK (where Seven Faces of Woman did not air); in France, the song narrowly missed the top 40, and in the United States, it failed to chart on the Billboard Hot 100 and charted on the lower end of the easy listening charts.

The song is featured over the opening sequence of the film Notting Hill. Elvis Costello recorded a cover version of the song in 1999 a version, produced by Trevor Jones, that was featured over the final sequence of the film. However, in the US release of the film, Costello's version is played during the opening sequence too, since American test audiences didn't approve of the original Aznavour version. Costello's version became very popular in Europe, and made it on to many charts.

== Track listing ==
"She" – 7" 45 rpm record

1. "She" – 2:50
2. "La barraka" – 2:45

"Lei" – 7" 45 rpm record

1. "Lei"
2. "La barraka"

"She" (1999 re-release) – CD single

1. "She (Tous les visages de l'amour)" – 2:52
2. "I Didn't See the Time Go By (Je n'ai pas vu le temps passer)" – 3:31

== Charts and certifications ==
=== Weekly charts ===
Chart (1974-1999)	Peak position
Austria (Ö3 Austria Top 40)	19
Belgium (Ultratop 50 Flanders)	12
Canada Adult Contemporary (RPM)	45
France (SNEP)	46
Ireland (IRMA)	1
Netherlands (Single Top 100)	24
UK Singles (Official Charts)	1
US Adult Contemporary (Billboard)	44
West Germany (GfK)	33

=== Certifications ===
Region	Certification	Certified units/sales
United Kingdom (BPI)	Silver	250,000^{^}
^{^} Shipments figures based on certification alone.

== Elvis Costello version ==
"She"

Single by Elvis Costello

from the album Notting Hill: Music from the Motion Picture
- Released: 1999
- Genre: Pop
- Length: 3:10
- Label: Mercury Records, Island Records
- Songwriters: Charles Aznavour, Herbert Kretzmer
- Producer: Trevor Jones

Elvis Costello recorded a cover version of the song in 1999 for the soundtrack of the film Notting Hill. This version of the song peaked at number 19 in the United Kingdom, giving Costello his first top 20 hit in the United Kingdom in 16 years, and his last to date.

== Personnel ==
- Elvis Costello - vocal
- David Hartley - piano
- Clem Clempson - guitar
- Trevor Barry - bass guitar
- Paul Clarvis - drums
- Frank Ricotti - vibraphone
- Geoffrey Alexander - conductor
- London Symphony Orchestra - orchestra

=== Production ===
- Trevor Jones - producer
- Julian Kershaw - arrangements
- Gareth Cousins - mixing engineer, recording engineer
- Paul Hicks - assistant mixing engineer
- Simon Rhodes - recording engineer

=== Track listing ===
2-track CD single – Europe (1999)

1. "She" – 3:10
2. "Painted from Memory" – 4:12

3-track CD single – Europe (1999)

1. "She" – 3:08
2. "This House Is Empty Now" – 5:11
3. "What's Her Name Today?" – 4:11

CD single – United Kingdom (1999)

1. "She" – 3:08
2. "Painted from Memory" – 4:14
3. "The Sweetest Punch" – 4:09

=== Charts ===
Chart (1999)	Peak position
Canada Adult Contemporary (RPM)	90
France (SNEP)	50
Netherlands (Single Top 100)	49
UK Singles (Official Charts)	19

=== Year-end charts ===
Chart (1999)	Position
Brazil (Crowley)	57

=== Certifications ===
Region	Certification	Certified units/sales
Spain (Promusicae)	Gold	30,000^{‡}
United Kingdom (BPI)	Silver	200,000^{‡}
^{‡} Sales+streaming figures based on certification alone.

== Laura Pausini cover ==
"She (Uguale a lei)"

Single by Laura Pausini
- Released: 8 March 2006
- Genre: Pop
- Length: 2:59
- Label: Warner Music Italy
- Songwriters: Charles Aznavour, Herbert Kretzmer, Laura Pausini

Laura Pausini singles chronology
"Il tuo nome in maiuscolo" (2006)	"She (Uguale a lei)" (2006)	"Io canto" (2006)

Italian singer Laura Pausini also released an Italian language cover of the song, titled "She (Uguale a lei)". The song was recorded for a Barilla TV spot. The lyrics of the song were adapted by Pausini herself, and are therefore different from the lyrics of Aznavour's Italian-language version of his hit. It was also released as a digital single on 8 March 2006, but was not featured on any of Pausini's studio albums. However, she recorded a new version of the song, included in her greatest hits album 20 - The Greatest Hits.

=== Live performances ===
Pausini performed the song live for the first time during the final of Sanremo Music Festival 2006, when she was invited as a guest artist. A live version of the song was included in a medley performed on 2 June 2007, during her concert at the San Siro stadium in Milan, later released as a video album titled San Siro 2007.

=== Track listing ===
Digital download

1. "She (Uguale a lei)" – 2:59

=== Charts ===
Chart (2006)	Peak position
Italy Digital Download (FIMI)	6

== Other cover versions ==
In addition to the famous Elvis Costello version noted above, the song has been recorded by many different artists over the years. The most notable versions include:

- American singer Jack Jones recorded a cover of the song for his 1975 album What I Did for Love. It was released as a single, becoming a big hit in the Philippines.
- Péter Máté created a Hungarian cover of the song. The first record containing this was only released after his death.
- British Comedian and music Hall legend Ken Dodd recorded a version for his 1976 album Love Together
- Dave Stewart and Terry Hall's short-lived project Vegas had a minor UK hit with the song in 1992, peaking at number 43 on the UK Singles Chart. Aznavour starred in the music video, standing at a fountain while being secretly observed by Hall and Stewart.
- The British Pop singer Engelbert Humperdinck recorded the song on his 2003 CD Definition of Love. He included a duet of She with Charles Aznavour on his 2014 duets album Engelbert Calling.
- French singer Jason Kouchak recorded the song for his 2008 album Midnight Classics.
- Irish singing group Celtic Thunder made a cover version on their second show Celtic Thunder: Act Two (2008) where Paul Byrom performed the song.
- A version by the composer and record producer Jason Hill, featuring Richard Butler of The Psychedelic Furs, was used in the trailer for David Fincher's movie, Gone Girl, in 2014.
- Israeli singer Matti Caspi released a Hebrew cover of the song in 2005.
- Paul Byrom recorded a cover of the song while a member of Celtic Thunder; the song was released on the self-titled debut album and their concert DVD "The Show."
- Former E.L.O. frontman Jeff Lynne released a cover version of the song on his 2012 album Long Wave.
- The duo She & Him released a cover of the song on their 2014 album, Classics.
- Daniel Boaventura recorded a cover for Morde & Assopra (Dinosaurs & Robots) soundtrack and performed the song on his 2011 live album Daniel Boaventura: Ao Vivo.
- Jay-R, the R&B prince, covered it for Philippine soap opera Beauty Queen.
- CBBC used the song for a reflective montage at the end of the memorial retrospective My Sarah Jane, celebrating the long-running Whoniverse character Sarah Jane Smith following the death of actress Elisabeth Sladen.
- Bryan Ferry covered it at the 2009 Cannes Film Festival with Aznavour joining him on stage at the end of the performance.
- Leeteuk (이특) Korean singer and member of the group Super Junior sang it as his solo part in their concert Super Show 4 in 2011/2012 and is recorded on their live album released in July 2013
