= 'Tain't What You Do (It's the Way That You Do It) =

Song

"'Tain't What You Do (It's the Way That You Do It)" is a song written by jazz musicians Melvin "Sy" Oliver and James "Trummy" Young. It was first recorded and released in 1939 by Jimmie Lunceford, followed within the same year by Ella Fitzgerald, Fats Waller, Adelaide Hall, Harry James, and Nat Gonella and His Georgians. The "shim sham" is often danced to the Lunceford recording of this song.

== Fun Boy Three with Bananarama version ==
"It Ain't What You Do...."

Single by Fun Boy Three with Bananarama

from the album Fun Boy Three
- B-side: "The Funrama Theme"
- Released: January 29, 1982
- Recorded: 1981
- Genre: New wave; pop; ska
- Length: 2:48
- Label: Chrysalis
- Songwriters: Sy Oliver; Trummy Young
- Producers: Dave Jordan; Fun Boy Three

Fun Boy Three singles chronology
"The Lunatics (Have Taken Over the Asylum)" (1981)	"It Ain't What You Do...." (1982)	"Really Saying Something" (1982)

Bananarama singles chronology
"Aie a Mwana" (1981)	"It Ain't What You Do...." (1982)	"Really Saying Something" (1982)

The jazz tune was transformed into a pop/new wave song with ska elements in 1982. With the title slightly altered to "It Ain't What You Do (It's the Way That You Do It)" (and shown on the single sleeve as "It Ain't What You Do...."), it was recorded by Fun Boy Three and Bananarama, and it was included on the former's self-titled debut album, but it was not available on a Bananarama album until 1988's Greatest Hits Collection.

Terry Hall of Fun Boy Three owned a copy of Bananarama's previous single "Aie a Mwana", and, after seeing an article about the trio in The Face, he decided he wanted them to sing background vocals on the song, solely based on the fact that he liked their look. "It Ain't What You Do...." became a big hit in the UK, climbing to number four in the UK Singles Chart, and achieving a Silver certification from the British Phonographic Industry. The success of the single also prompted Bananarama to return the favour and have Fun Boy Three sing on their next single, "Really Saying Something".

== Media appearances ==
- In 2012, the cover version was used in a commercial for Hewlett-Packard's color printers, which aired in the United States
- Throughout the early-mid 2010s, English DIY retailer B&Q used Fun Boy Three's version of the song
- Fun Boy Three's version of the song was also used in another television advertisement for the Chrysler PT Cruiser in the United Kingdom in the early 2000s
- Is part of the soundtrack of the film Lolita (1997) sung by Ella Fitzgerald
- The Lunceford version of the song appeared in several episodes of The Marvelous Mrs. Maisel
- In the 2009 film Youth in Revolt this song was used.

== Track listings ==
7" single

1. "It Ain't What You Do (It's the Way That You Do It)" – 2:54
2. "The Funrama Theme" – 2:56 +

12" single

1. "It Ain't What You Do..." / "Just Do It" (Extended Version) – 5:55 ++
2. "The Funrama Theme" (Extended Version) – 5:55 +

+ A remix of "The Funrama Theme" with overdubbed brass, titled "Funrama 2", appears on The Fun Boy Three's album The Fun Boy Three.

++ The first 2:52 of the 12" version is the standard album version of the song, which is different from the 7". Some reissues of the album also include the "Just Do It" section as a separate track.

== Charts ==
Chart (1982)	Peak position
Australia (Kent Music Report)	55
Belgium (Ultratop Flanders)	3
Ireland (IRMA)	5
Israel (Israeli Singles Chart)	8
Luxembourg (Radio Luxembourg)	2
Netherlands (MegaCharts)	3
New Zealand (RIANZ Singles Chart)	37
UK Singles Chart	4
US Dance Club Songs (Billboard)	49
