= Laugh (Terry Hall album) =

Studio album by Terry Hall
- Released: 6 October 1997
- Genre: Alternative rock
- Label: Southsea Bubble Company (UK), Victor/Telstar (Japan)
- Producer: Terry Hall, Cenzo Townshend, Craig Gannon

Terry Hall chronology
| Home (1994) | Laugh (1997) | The Hour of Two Lights (2003) |

Singles from Laugh
- 1. "Ballad of a Landlord" Released: 2 June 1997; 2. "I Saw the Light" Released: 1997

Professional ratings
Review scores
| Source | Rating |
|---|---|
| AllMusic | 4/5 stars |
| NME | 8/10 stars |
| Record Collector | 4/5 stars |
| Uncut | 3/5 stars |

Laugh is the second solo album by British singer-songwriter Terry Hall. It was released in 1997 on the Southsea Bubble Company label. Hall wrote the majority of the album with guitarist Craig Gannon and collaborated with several acclaimed musicians namely singer-songwriter Stephen Duffy, the High Llamas' bandleader Sean O'Hagan and most notably Damon Albarn of Blur, whom Hall had collaborated with on Hall's 1995 EP Rainbows. The album was produced by Hall with Gannon and Cenzo Townshend. It received good reviews when original released on CD in October 1997 and peaked at number fifty on the UK Albums Chart and includes the singles "Ballad of a Landlord" and "I Saw the Light".

A special edition of the album was released in 2009 by Edsel record label. The new version featured all of the B-sides from the two singles along with liner notes by Rhoda Dakar.

== Track listing ==
1. "Love to See You" (Craig Gannon, Terry Hall) – 4:38
2. "Sonny and His Sister" (Stephen Duffy, Hall) – 3:42
3. "Ballad of a Landlord" (Gannon, Hall) – 3:54
4. "Take It Forever" (Gannon, Hall) – 4:10
5. "Misty Water" (Gannon, Hall) – 4:03
6. "A Room Full of Nothing" (Damon Albarn, Hall) – 3:30
7. "Happy Go Lucky" (Hall, Sean O'Hagan) – 3:38
8. "For the Girl" (Albarn, Hall)– 4:22
9. "Summer Follows Spring" (Gannon, Hall) – 5:32
10. "I Saw the Light" (Todd Rundgren) – 3:20

2009 edition bonus tracks

11. "Ballad of a Landlord" (acoustic version) – 3:48 (B-side of "Ballad of a Landlord")
12. "Working Class Hero" (live) (John Lennon) – 3:24 (B-side of "Ballad of a Landlord")
13. "Close to You" (Burt Bacharach, Hal David) – 3:59 (B-side of "Ballad of a Landlord")
14. "Music to Watch Girls By" (Sid Ramin, Tony Velona) – 2:54 (B-side of "Ballad of a Landlord")
15. "Bang Went Forever" (Hall, Paul Kennedy) – 4:45 (B-side of "Ballad of a Landlord")
16. "Love to See You" (acoustic version) (Gannon, Hall) – 4:04 (B-side of "I Saw the Light")
17. "Misty Water" (acoustic version) (Gannon, Hall) – 3:56
18. "Interview" – 3:15 (B-side of "Ballad of a Landlord")

== Personnel ==
Musicians

- Terry Hall – vocals, handclapping
- Craig Gannon – guitar
- Martyn Campbell – bass
- Chris Sharrock – drums
- Terry Disley – keyboards
- Simon Rogers – keyboards, programming
- Stephen Street – handclapping
- Dave Auty – handclapping
- Nick Heyward – backing vocals
- Sean O'Hagan – backing vocals
- Angie Pollock – backing vocals
- Mick Ball – trumpet
- Caroline LaVelle – cello
- Rosie Lindsell – bassoon
- Jocelyn Pook – viola
- Julia Singleton – violin
- Angharad Warren – flute
- Susanna Warren – clarinet

Technical

- Terry Hall – arrangements, producer
- Craig Gannon – strings, arrangements, producer
- Cenzo Townshend – producer
- Stephen Street – remixing
- Elain Constantine – photography

== Chart positions ==
Album

| Chart (1997) | Peak position |
|---|---|
| UK Album Chart | 50 |

Singles

| Single | Chart (1997) | Position |
|---|---|---|
| "Ballard of a Landlord" | UK Singles Chart | 50 |
