= Terry Hall (singer) =

British singer (1959–2022)

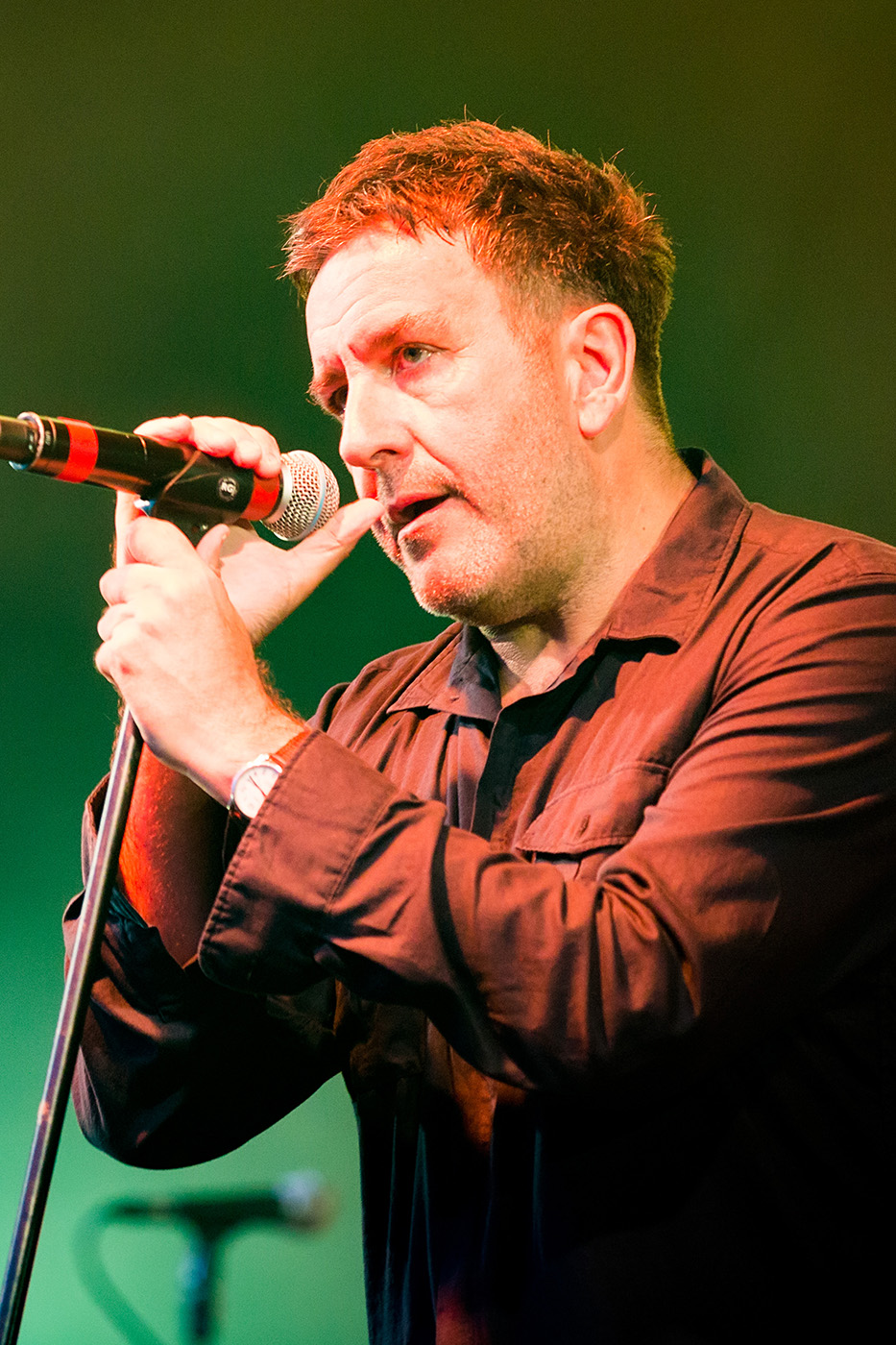
- Hall at Kew Gardens, 2015

Background information
- Born: Terence Edward Hall; 19 March 1959; Coventry, Warwickshire, England
- Died: 18 December 2022 (aged 63) Marylebone, London, England
- Genres: Rock; new wave; ska
- Occupations: Singer; songwriter
- Years active: 1978–2022
- Labels: Anxious; Southsea Bubble Company
- Formerly of: The Specials; Fun Boy Three; the Colourfield; Terry, Blair & Anouchka; Vegas
- Spouse(s): Jeanette Hall, Lindy Heymann

Terence Edward Hall (19 March 1959 – 18 December 2022) was a British musician who came to prominence as the lead singer of the 2-tone band the Specials, and later recorded with groups such as Fun Boy Three, the Colourfield, Terry, Blair & Anouchka, and Vegas.

Hall released two solo studio albums and also collaborated with many artists including David Stewart, Bananarama, the Lightning Seeds, Sinéad O'Connor, Stephen Duffy, Dub Pistols, Gorillaz, Damon Albarn, D12, Tricky, Lily Allen and Shakespears Sister.

== Early life ==
Terence Edward Hall was born on 19 March 1959 in Coventry, England, where he was also raised. He had a German-Jewish grandfather, and said of his heritage, "I grew up in an environment where you didn't really know where you were from. Coventry was built on immigrants because it was an industrial city looking for cheap labour. I don't think it's an accident that a group like the Specials came out of that".

Hall was abducted by a paedophile ring on a trip to France at the age of 12. He wrote about it in an autobiographical song "Well Fancy That!" on the Fun Boy Three's second album. He suffered from depression afterwards, ultimately leaving school before his fifteenth birthday, taking various short-term jobs, such as a bricklayer, quantity surveyor, and apprentice hairdresser.

== Career ==
=== Early years ===
Hall became an active member of the burgeoning Coventry music scene of the late 1970s, playing in a local punk band called Squad and being credited as a composer on their "Red Alert" single.

=== The Specials ===
Initially the frontman of the Coventry Automatics in 1977–78, who became the Specials in early 1979, Hall first came to prominence in the UK in 1979 when BBC Radio 1 DJ John Peel played their debut single "Gangsters" on his show. The band then went on to release their debut studio album, The Specials, which also contained the hits "A Message to You Rudy" and "Too Much Too Young". In October 1980 the group released their second studio album, More Specials, which contained three more hit singles: "Do Nothing", "Stereotype" and "Rat Race".

The single "Ghost Town", released in June 1981, spent three weeks at number one and ten weeks in the top 40 of the UK Singles Chart. One of the songs on the B-side, "Friday Night Saturday Morning", penned by Hall, described a night out at the Coventry Locarno.

=== Fun Boy Three ===
After the Specials' single "Ghost Town" was released, Hall left the band to start a new group called Fun Boy Three with two of his Specials bandmates, Lynval Golding and Neville Staple. Fun Boy Three's first hit single, "The Lunatics (Have Taken Over the Asylum)," was released in 1981 and was followed-up in 1982 with "It Ain't What You Do (It's the Way That You Do It)," a duet with Bananarama. Fun Boy Three then provided guest vocals for Bananarama's single, "Really Saying Something." In the same year, Hall and his bandmates appeared in the music video for "Driving in My Car" by Madness and released their debut studio album, Fun Boy Three, which reached No. 7 in the UK Albums Chart. In February 1983, Fun Boy Three released their second studio album, Waiting, which contained two Top Ten hits: "The Tunnel of Love" and "Our Lips Are Sealed". The latter was a song Hall had written with Jane Wiedlin, who had already had success in the US with a version of the song by her group the Go-Go's.

=== The Colourfield ===
Hall formed the Colourfield in 1984. The band released the 1985 studio album Virgins and Philistines, which included the hit single "Thinking of You". The album spent seven weeks in the UK chart, peaking at No. 12. This new musical direction would culminate in collaborations with Ian Broudie and Hall contributing a number of songs to Broudie's albums as the Lightning Seeds. Hall also co-wrote the song "Smoke Ring" for Broudie's debut solo studio album Tales Told. The song was also released as the lead track on the Smoke Rings EP. A second Colourfield studio album, Deception, was released in 1987, reaching No. 95 on the UK Albums Chart.

=== Terry, Blair & Anouchka ===
Hall teamed up with American actress Blair Booth and jeweller Anouchka Grose and began recording under the moniker of Terry, Blair & Anouchka in 1989. After two singles which both scraped into the top 80 of the UK Singles Chart, the trio released their debut studio album Ultra Modern Nursery Rhymes, which failed to chart.

=== Vegas ===
Hall joined forces with Dave Stewart of the Eurythmics in 1992. The duo formed a band called Vegas and released Vegas, a slick electronic pop album that was heavily promoted by their label BMG. It failed to chart. Only one of the three singles lifted from the album, "Possessed", managed to break the UK top 40, reaching No. 32.

=== Solo ===
Hall began his formal solo career in 1994 with his debut album, Home. The album was produced by his former collaborator Ian Broudie of the Lightning Seeds; it reached No. 95 on the UK Albums Chart. The album also featured ex-Echo & the Bunnymen bassist Les Pattinson. The album's release was supported by the single "Sense", which reached No. 54 on the UK Singles Chart. The following year, Hall released the Rainbows EP in collaboration with Damon Albarn of Blur, which climbed to No. 62 on the UK Singles Chart.

In 1997, Hall made a cameo in the music video for No Doubt's music video for "Sunday Morning", playing Gwen Stefani's boyfriend. Hall followed up his debut studio album with Laugh later that same year. It went on to become his most successful solo album, reaching No. 50 on the UK Albums Chart. The album contained the top 50 UK single "Ballad of a Landlord", with an accompanying music video in which the members of No Doubt cameoed. Both of Hall's solo albums featured long-time collaborator Craig Gannon on guitar.

=== Hall and Mushtaq ===
Hall collaborated with Mushtaq of Fun-Da-Mental on the 2003 studio album The Hour of Two Lights which contains contributions from Blur's Damon Albarn, a twelve-year-old Lebanese girl singer, a blind Algerian rapper, a Syrian flautist, Hebrew vocalists, and a group of Polish gypsies.

=== Later years ===
Hall appeared as a guest on the Gorillaz and D12 collaboration single "911", a 2001 song about terrorist attacks in the US. Hall sings the chorus along with Gorillaz frontman Damon Albarn, while D12 rap their verses. Hall guested on the song "Never Alone", which appeared on the 2003 Junkie XL studio album Radio JXL: A Broadcast from the Computer Hell Cabin.

Hall was featured on the studio album True Love by Toots and the Maytals. The album won the 2004 Grammy Award for Best Reggae Album and showcased many notable musicians.

Hall provided vocals for several tracks on the Dub Pistols' 2007 studio album Speakers and Tweeters, after appearing on the band's song "Problem Is" from the studio album Six Million Ways to Live. Hall also appeared live at the Glastonbury Festival on the Pyramid Stage with Lily Allen and his former Specials bandmate Lynval Golding. He also played on the Park Stage, once again with Golding and also Damon Albarn and beatboxer Shlomo, playing a version of the Specials' "A Message to You Rudy". Later that year, he appeared at GuilFest on the BBC Radio 2 Stage, once again with the Dub Pistols and Golding.

=== The Specials reunion ===
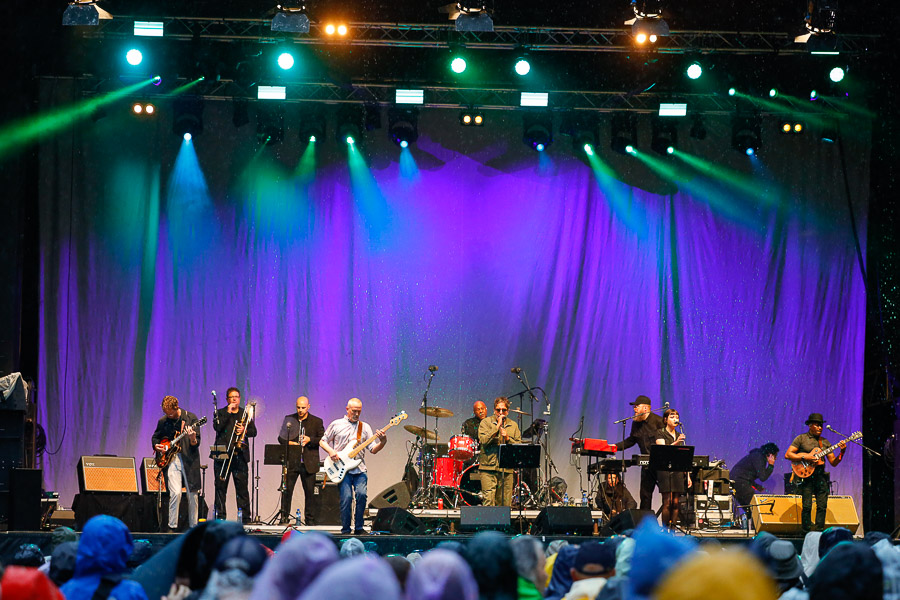
The Specials in 2022

Hall contacted his former Specials bandmates with the prospect of a reunion. He announced that the Specials would be reforming for tour dates and possibly recordings on 30 March 2008. Six members of the band performed on the Main Stage at Bestival as the surprise act on 6 September 2008. The Specials' original keyboardist and primary composer Jerry Dammers did not play at the festival and owns the trademark rights to the name "the Specials," so the group was billed as "Very 'Special' Guests". The Specials announced 2009 tour dates to celebrate their 30th anniversary on 2 December 2008. Dammers did not join the band on the tour, although relations between the two parties were reportedly strong. Hall was quoted as saying "the door remains open to him". Hall was still performing with the Specials in 2018, including a concert with the Rolling Stones, along with his original band members Lynval Golding and Horace Panter, and often DJed in various UK venues.

The Specials released a new studio album entitled Encore on 1 February 2019. Upon release it went straight to the number one spot on the UK Albums Chart, becoming the highest-charting album ever released by the Specials.

== Personal life and death ==
Hall had a brief romantic relationship with Jane Wiedlin of the Go-Go's in 1980. They co-wrote the song "Our Lips Are Sealed".

He had two sons with his first wife, Jeanette Hall, including the DJ Felix Hall and another son with his second wife, Lindy Heymann.

Hall said that he suffered from lifelong depression after being abducted and sexually abused at the age of 12. He later became addicted to the Valium he had been prescribed. Following a suicide attempt in 2004, Hall was diagnosed with bipolar disorder.

Hall died from pancreatic cancer at a clinic on Devonshire Place in Marylebone, London, on 18 December 2022, aged 63.
