= The Tunnel of Love (song) =

Single by Fun Boy Three

from the album Waiting
- Released: 1983
- Genre: New wave
- Length: 3:08
- Label: Chrysalis
- Songwriter(s): Golding, Hall, Staples
- Producer(s): Fun Boy Three, David Byrne

Fun Boy Three singles chronology
"The More I See (The Less I Believe)" (1982)	"The Tunnel of Love" (1983)	"Our Lips Are Sealed" (1983)

"The Tunnel of Love" (sometimes listed as "Tunnel of Love") is a song written and recorded by the group Fun Boy Three. It was the second single from their second album Waiting and returned the group to the UK top ten following the comparative failure of the album's first single "The More I See (The Less I Believe)", which had been their only single release to miss the UK top 40.

Both the single and album contain the same version of the song. However, on the album, David Byrne is credited with production, while the single credits The Fun Boy Three with production, and David Byrne and Jeremy Green with mixing.

The B-side featured an alternative version of their debut single "The Lunatics (Have Taken Over the Asylum)", performed using only voices and body percussion.

== Track listing ==
Fun Boy Three 7" single (Chrysalis CHS 2678) / 12" single (Chrysalis CHS 12 2678)

No.	Title	Writer(s)	Length
1.	"The Tunnel of Love"	Fun Boy Three	3:08
2.	"The Lunacy Legacy"	Fun Boy Three	3:53

Most issues of the single list the title as "The Tunnel of Love" on the cover and "Tunnel of Love" on the label. On the album Waiting, the title is consistently given as "The Tunnel of Love".

== Charts ==
Chart (1983)	Peak position
Belgium (Ultratop 50 Flanders)	22
Netherlands (Single Top 100)	38
UK Singles (OCC)	10
