= He Was Really Sayin' Somethin' =

1964 song by the Velvelettes

- UK single sleeve

Single by the Velvelettes
- B-side: "Throw a Farewell Kiss"
- Released: 28 December 1964
- Recorded: November 1964 (version 1); December 1964 (version 2)
- Genre: Soul
- Length: 2:30
- Label: V.I.P. (Motown)
- Songwriters: Norman Whitfield; William "Mickey" Stevenson; Edward Holland, Jr.
- Producer: Norman Whitfield

The Velvelettes singles chronology
"Needle in a Haystack" (1964)	"He Was Really Sayin' Somethin'" (1964)	"Lonely, Lonely Girl Am I" (1965)

"Really Saying Something"

Single by Bananarama with Fun Boy Three

from the album Deep Sea Skiving
- B-side: "Give Us Back Our Cheap Fares"
- Released: 29 March 1982
- Recorded: 1981
- Genre: New wave; avant-funk; pop
- Length: 2:45
- Label: London
- Songwriters: Norman Whitfield; William "Mickey" Stevenson; Edward Holland, Jr.
- Producers: Dave Jordan; Fun Boy Three

Bananarama singles chronology
"It Ain't What You Do...." (1982)	"Really Saying Something" (1982)	"Shy Boy" (1982)
"If" (2001)	"Really Saying Something" (Solasso v Bananarama) (2004)	"Move in My Direction" (2005)

Fun Boy Three singles chronology
"It Ain't What You Do...." (1982)	"Really Saying Something" (1982)	"The Telephone Always Rings" (1982)

"He Was Really Sayin' Somethin'" is a soul song written by Motown songwriters Norman Whitfield, William "Mickey" Stevenson, and Edward Holland, Jr. in 1964. The song is notable in both a 1964 version by American Motown girl group the Velvelettes, and a 1982 hit version (with the title altered to "Really Saying Something") by British girl group Bananarama.

== Background ==
=== Velvelettes version ===
The original version of the song was recorded by Motown group the Velvelettes in December 1964. An alternate version recorded in October/November had been discarded. Produced by Norman Whitfield, the Velvelettes' version was released on Motown's V.I.P. label on December 27, 1964, and was a minor hit for the group in early 1965. "He Was Really Sayin' Somethin'" peaked at number 64 on the U.S. Billboard Hot 100, and at number 21 on the then recently reinstated Billboard R&B Singles chart. The single was the second most successful release for the Velvelettes, a minor Motown act which never released a full-length album.

"Throw a Farewell Kiss", composed by Whitfield and Holland and produced by Whitfield, had been recorded in October 1962 and was issued as the B-side of "He Was Really Sayin' Somethin'". Six years later, Whitfield had the Temptations record "Farewell Kiss" for their 1971 album Sky's the Limit.

=== Bananarama version ===
In 1982, the English girl group Bananarama recorded a cover version of the song and released it as the first single from their debut album Deep Sea Skiving. Fun Boy Three provided background vocals, having had a hit with Bananarama earlier in the year with another cover, "T'ain't What You Do (It's the Way That You Do It)".

The 1982 single became the second consecutive top-five hit for both Bananarama and Fun Boy Three, peaking at number five in the UK Singles Chart. It also received heavy play on the then-young MTV network in America. It became the group's third single to chart there, but only became a minor hit, peaking at #108. In Australia, "Really Saying Something" was both groups' second chart entry, peaking at number 74.

The B-side, "Give Us Back Our Cheap Fares", was issued on CD for the first time on the 2007 UK reissue of Deep Sea Skiving as one of five bonus tracks.

In 2004, a remixed version of "Really Saying Something" by Solasso was released as a promotional single. It was later included on Bananarama's album Drama.

==== Track listing ====
- UK 7″ single (NANA1)
1. "Really Saying Something" – 2:41
2. "Give Us Back Our Cheap Fares" – 2:44
- US 7″ single (LD201)
1. "Really Saying Something" (US version) – 3:44
2. "Give Us Back Our Cheap Fares" – 2:44
- UK 12″ vinyl (NANX1)
1. "Really Saying Something" (extended mix) – 5:40
  Remixed by Fun Boy Three
2. "Give Us Back Our Cheap Fares" (extended version) – 4:25
- UK 12″ vinyl – stickered limited edition (NANX1)
1. "Really Saying Something" (extended mix) – 5:40
2. "Aie A Mwana" (extended version) – 5:46
- US 12″ vinyl (LLD101)
1. "Really Saying Something" (extended US version) – 7:50
2. "Aie A Mwana" (extended US version) – 6:46
3. "Aie A Mwana" (dub mix) – 4:38
- German 12″ vinyl (6400 606)
1. "Really Saying Something" (extended mix) – 5:40
2. "Give Us Back Our Cheap Fares" (extended version) – 4:25
- 2004 versions
1. "Really Saying Something" (Solasso mix) – 5:58
2. "Really Saying Something" (Solasso radio edit)
3. "Really Saying Something" (Solasso dirty dub) – 5:58
4. "Really Saying Something" (Hardino radio edit)
5. "Really Saying Something" (Hardino remix) – 6:20
6. "Really Saying Something" (DJ Bomba & Soulseekerz remix) – 6:37
7. "Really Saying Something" (Kenny Hayes Sunshine funk remix) – 5:34
8. "Really Saying Something" (Giresse breakbeat remix) – 5:21
9. "Really Saying Something" (Shanghai Surprise radio edit) – 3:21
10. "Really Saying Something" (Shanghai Surprise club mix) – 6:44

=== Buffalo G version ===
"We're Really Saying Something"

Single by Buffalo G
- Released: 29 May 2000
- Genre: Pop; pop rap
- Length: 3:18
- Label: Epic
- Songwriters: Norman Whitfield; William "Mickey" Stevenson; Edward Holland, Jr.

Alternative cover
- CD2 cover

The Irish girl group Buffalo G released a rap cover version of the song in 2000, reaching the top 20 in both the Irish and UK charts.

=== Shakespears Sister version ===
"Really Saying Something"

Single by Shakespears Sister
- Released: April 2011
- Genre: Pop; rock
- Length: 2:36
- Label: SF
- Songwriters: Norman Whitfield; William "Mickey" Stevenson; Edward Holland, Jr.

In 2011, Shakespears Sister released their own version of "Really Saying Something" to celebrate 30 years since Siobhan Fahey's former band Bananarama recorded their first single. It was available as a limited edition CD single and a digital download.

==== Track listing ====
- CD single / digital download
1. "Really Saying Something" – 2:36
2. "A Loaded Gun" – 4:15
- 2013 digital download
1. "Really Saying Something" – 2:36
2. "A Loaded Gun" – 4:15
3. "A Loaded Gun" (early version)

== Charts ==
=== Velvelettes version ===
Chart (1965)	Peak position
US Billboard Hot 100	64
US Hot R&B/Hip-Hop Songs (Billboard)	21

=== Bananarama version ===
Chart (1982)	Peak position
Australia (Kent Music Report)	74
Belgium (Ultratop 50 Flanders)	7
Israel (IBA)	12
Netherlands (Single Top 100)	16
UK Singles (Official Charts)	5
US Bubbling Under Hot 100 (Billboard)	8
US Dance Club Songs (Billboard)	16

=== Buffalo G version ===
Chart (2000)	Peak position
Ireland (IRMA)	13
UK Singles (Official Charts)	17
