= Waiting (Fun Boy Three album) =

Studio album by Fun Boy Three
- Released: February 1983
- Recorded: October–December 1982
- Studio: Wessex, London
- Genre: New wave
- Length: 31:19
- Label: Chrysalis
- Producer: David Byrne

Fun Boy Three chronology
Fun Boy Three (1982)	Waiting (1983)	The Best of the Fun Boy Three (1984)

Waiting is the second and final studio album by the English new wave pop band Fun Boy Three, released in 1983 by Chrysalis Records. It featured the hit single "Our Lips Are Sealed", co-written by Terry Hall and previously recorded by the Go-Go's. It was produced by David Byrne.

The album's lead track, "Murder She Said," is a cover of the theme from the four films in the British Miss Marple series, starring Margaret Rutherford, originally released from 1961 to 1964.

== Critical reception ==
Professional ratings
Review scores
Source	Rating
AllMusic	4/5 stars
Christgau's Record Guide	B+
Rolling Stone	3/5 stars

In 1983, Robert Palmer of The New York Times called Waiting one of "the summer's worthier record releases... that shouldn't be overlooked". He added, "The songs are full of barbed political and social commentary with a decidedly English bias. The harmonies and melodic twists and turns are reminiscent of 1930's pop, and the odd but effective arrangements feature trombone, cello and other orchestral instruments in a kind of music hall mélange." Robert Christgau found that "David Byrne's production suits songwriting that has advanced beyond the undernourishment of their breakaway debut." David Fricke of Rolling Stone observed that the album featured "clever twists of familiar musical themes and everyday situations into bitter accusations of social and sexual betrayal". He praised Byrne's "artful production", adding, "Without muting the dark irony of the group's eponymous debut album, Byrne discreetly amplifies the spare arrangements with a sly pop sparkle."

In a retrospective review, Stephen Cook of AllMusic noted the album's "slicker production and decidedly more pop-flavored sound" than its predecessor, 1982's Fun Boy Three, and praised its "wry and spot-on lyrics" and Byrne's "fine production work".

== Track listing ==
All songs written by Fun Boy Three, unless otherwise noted.

=== UK version ===
Side one

1. "Murder She Said" (Ron Goodwin) – 1:57
2. "The More I See (The Less I Believe)" – 3:38
3. "Going Home" – 3:36
4. "We're Having All the Fun" – 2:51
5. "The Farm Yard Connection" – 2:46

Side two

1. "The Tunnel of Love" – 3:08
2. "Our Lips Are Sealed" (Terry Hall, Jane Wiedlin) – 3:36
3. "The Pressure of Life (Takes Weight Off the Body)" – 3:10
4. "Things We Do" – 3:36
5. "Well Fancy That!" – 3:06

The Japanese and Swedish versions of the album adhere to this track listing but add the 1982 single "Summertime" at the end of side two. Some digital services, including Apple Music, substitute the shorter single mix of "Our Lips Are Sealed".

=== US version ===
Side one

1. "Our Lips Are Sealed" (Hall, Wiedlin) – 3:36
2. "The Tunnel of Love" – 3:08
3. "The Pressure of Life (Takes Weight Off the Body)" – 3:10
4. "Things We Do" – 3:36
5. "The Farm Yard Connection" – 2:46

Side two

1. "Murder She Said" (Goodwin) – 1:57
2. "The More I See (The Less I Believe)" – 3:38
3. "Going Home" – 3:36
4. "We're Having All the Fun" – 2:51
5. "Well Fancy That!" – 3:06

== Personnel ==
Fun Boy Three

- Terry Hall
- Neville Staple
- Lynval Golding

Additional musicians

- June Miles-Kingston – drums, vocals
- Nicky Holland – keyboards, vocals
- Bethan Peters – bass guitar, vocals
- Annie Whitehead – trombone
- Caroline Lavelle – cello
- Ingrid Schroeder – vocals
- Geraldo d'Arbilly – percussion
- Dick Cuthell – cornet
- David Byrne – guitar

Technical

- David Byrne – producer, mixing
- Jeremy Green – mixing, engineer
- Keith Fernly – assistant engineer
- Fun Boy Three – arrangers
- Nicky Holland – arrangers
- Mike Owen – photography
- David Storey – design

== Charts ==
Chart (1983)	Peak position	Certifications (sales thresholds)
Australia (Kent Music Report)	–	Certifications (sales thresholds)
Netherlands (MegaCharts)	47	
New Zealand (Recording Industry Association of New Zealand)	11	
UK (Official Charts Company)	7	British Phonographic Industry: Silver
US (Billboard 200)	104	
