= Vegas (duo) =

Musical collaboration of Terry Hall and David A. Stewart

- Origin: United Kingdom
- Years active: 1992–1993
- Labels: BMG; RCA
- Members: Terry Hall; David A. Stewart

Vegas was a musical outfit, active in the early 1990s. The band was formed by the former Specials and Fun Boy Three singer Terry Hall and Eurythmics member David A. Stewart, with Swedish music producer Olle Romö and Emmanuel Guiot making up the group (though like Tears for Fears and OMD before them, promotion was focused on the main duo). They released their self-titled album for RCA Records in 1992 as well as a trio of singles, including a cover of Charles Aznavour's number one hit "She".

== Discography ==
Albums

Year	Album details
1992	Vegas: Released: 1992; Label: RCA/BMG

Singles

Year	Title	UK Singles Chart
1992	"Possessed"	32
1992	"She"	43
1993	"Walk into the Wind"	65
