= Fun Boy Three =

English new wave pop band (1981–1983)

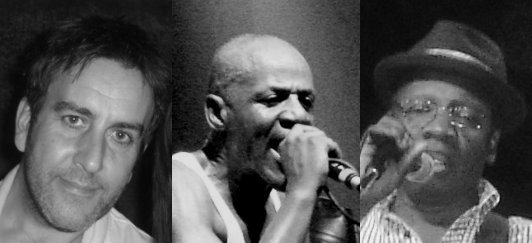
- Left to right: Terry Hall, Neville Staple, Lynval Golding

Background information
- Origin: United Kingdom
- Genres: New wave; pop
- Years active: 1981–1983
- Label: Chrysalis
- Spinoff of: The Specials
- Past members: Terry Hall; Lynval Golding; Neville Staple; June Miles-Kingston; Bethan Peters

Fun Boy Three were an English new wave pop band, active from 1981 to 1983 and formed by singers Terry Hall, Neville Staple and Lynval Golding after they left the Specials. They released two albums and had seven UK top 20 hits.

== History ==
Fun Boy Three reduced the ska sound that they and Jerry Dammers had crafted with great success with the Specials and initially took a more minimal approach with the focus on percussion and vocals. For their second album they assembled a six-piece backing group including a cellist and a trombone player, allowing the record to feature more diverse and expansive arrangements, and also enabling them to play live instead of being a purely studio group as previously. The band enjoyed seven UK top 20 singles, starting with "The Lunatics (Have Taken Over the Asylum)" and including the top 10 hits "It Ain't What You Do (It's the Way That You Do It)", "Tunnel of Love" and "Our Lips Are Sealed". They created two albums of which the eponymous debut was the more commercially successful. The follow-up album Waiting, produced by David Byrne, was well-received critically.

Following the trio's last UK hit "Our Lips Are Sealed", co-written by Terry Hall and Jane Wiedlin of the Go-Go's, who had a U.S. hit with the song a year earlier, they then toured the United States and split afterwards due to Hall's sudden departure, leading to a 15-year rift with Staple.

They were credited with helping launch the career in 1982 of Bananarama, whom Hall first saw in The Face magazine. The three women provided credited chorus vocals on the hit "It Ain't What You Do (It's the Way That You Do It)"; the Fun Boy Three later sang on the Bananarama song "Really Saying Something", both reaching the top 5 in the UK.

For their 1982 singles "The Telephone Always Rings" and "Summertime", the group collaborated with the Leicester-based horn section The Swinging Laurels. They received official sleeve credits, featured in the video clip for "The Telephone Always Rings", and performed alongside the trio on television broadcasts including Top of the Pops.

== Discography ==
Fun Boy Three discography
- Studio albums: 2
- Live albums: 1
- Compilation albums: 3
- Singles: 9

=== Studio albums ===
List of studio albums, with selected details and chart positions
| Title | Details | Chart positions | | | | | Certifications (sales thresholds) |
| Title | Details | UK | AUS | NL | NZ | US | Certifications (sales thresholds) |
|---|---|---|---|---|---|---|---|
| The Fun Boy Three | Released: March 1982; Label: Chrysalis | 7 | 84 | 10 | 17 | — | BPI: Gold |
| Waiting | Released: February 1983; Label: Chrysalis | 14 | — | 47 | 11 | 104 | BPI: Silver |
"–" denotes releases that did not chart or were not released in that territory.

=== Live albums ===
List of live albums, with selected details
| Title | Details |
|---|---|
| Live on the Test | Released: 1994; Format: CD; Label: Windsong International; Note recorded 1983 |

=== Compilation albums ===
List of compilation albums, with selected details
| Title | Details |
|---|---|
| The Best of Fun Boy Three | Released: 1984; Format: LP, CS; Label: Chrysalis |
| Really Saying Something: The Best of Fun Boy | Released: 1997; Format: CD; Label: Chrysalis |
| The Complete Fun Boy Three | Released: 4 August 2023; Format: 5×CD + DVD; Label: Chrysalis Catalogue |

=== Singles ===
| Year | Title | Chart positions | | | | | | Certifications | Album |
| Year | Title | UK | AUS | IRL | NL | NZ | US Club Play | Certifications | Album |
|---|---|---|---|---|---|---|---|---|---|
| 1981 | "The Lunatics (Have Taken Over the Asylum)" | 20 | 43 | 28 | — | 46 | — | | Fun Boy Three |
| 1982 | "It Ain't What You Do (It's the Way That You Do It)" (Fun Boy Three with Bananarama) | 4 | 55 | 5 | 3 | 37 | 49 | BPI: Silver | Fun Boy Three |
| 1982 | "Really Saying Something" (Bananarama with Fun Boy Three) | 5 | 74 | 9 | 16 | — | 16 | BPI: Silver | Deep Sea Skiving (Bananarama album) |
| 1982 | "The Telephone Always Rings" | 17 | — | 29 | 49 | — | — | | Fun Boy Three |
| 1982 | "Summertime" | 18 | — | 13 | — | — | — | | — |
| 1982 | "The More I See (The Less I Believe)" | 68 | — | — | — | — | — | | Waiting |
| 1983 | "The Tunnel of Love" | 10 | — | 14 | 38 | — | — | | Waiting |
| 1983 | "Our Lips Are Sealed" | 7 | — | 13 | — | — | — | | Waiting |
| 1983 | "The Farm Yard Connection" (Germany only) | — | — | — | — | — | — | | Waiting |
"–" denotes releases that did not chart or were not released in that territory.
