= Bananarama discography =

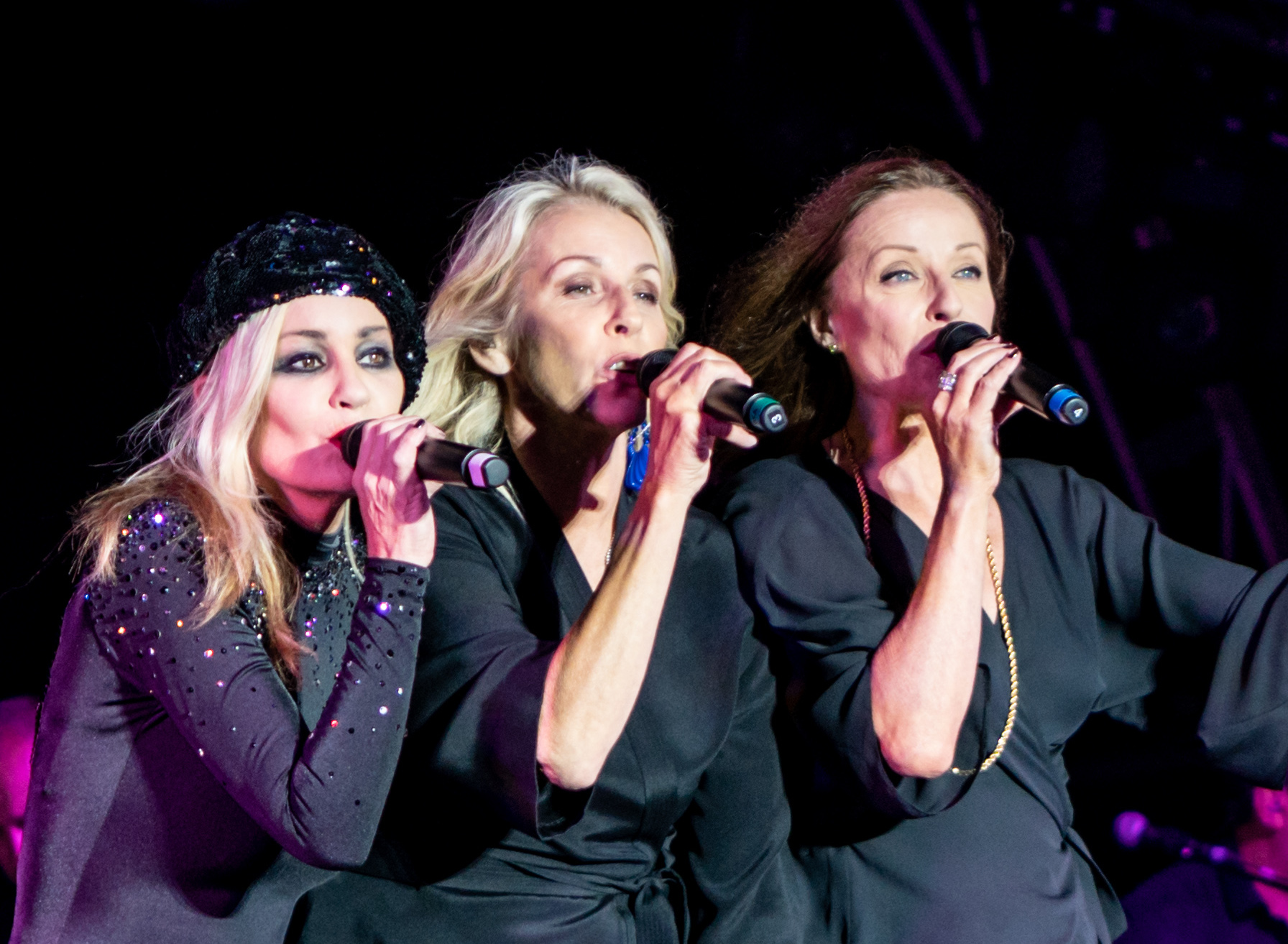
- Bananarama performing in 2018
- Studio albums: 12
- Extended plays: 2
- Live albums: 3
- Compilation albums: 16
- Singles: 51
- Video albums: 4
- Music videos: 48

The Irish-English pop group Bananarama have released 12 studio albums, three live albums, 16 compilation albums, two extended plays, 51 singles (including three as a featured artist), four video albums and 48 music videos.

== Albums ==
=== Studio albums ===
List of studio albums, with selected chart positions and certifications
Title	Details	Peak chart positions								Certifications
Title	Details	UK	AUS	CAN	GER	NZ	SWE	SWI	US	Certifications
Deep Sea Skiving	Released: 9 March 1983; Label: London; Formats: LP, cassette, CD	7	85	48	—	—	—	—	63	BPI: Silver
Bananarama	Released: 16 April 1984; Label: London; Formats: LP, cassette, CD	16	99	—	45	—	—	9	30	BPI: Silver
True Confessions	Released: 30 June 1986; Label: London; Formats: LP, cassette, CD	6 (Note: True Confessions originally peaked at number 46 in 1986. It reached a new peak of number 6 in 2026 following the release of its 40th anniversary edition.)	19	10	25	33	—	6	15	MC: Platinum; RIAA: Gold
Wow!	Released: 7 September 1987; Label: London; Formats: LP, cassette, CD	26	1	32	65	38	31	22	44	BPI: Gold; MC: Gold
Pop Life	Released: 13 May 1991; Label: London; Formats: LP, CD, cassette	42	146	—	—	—	37	—	—	
Please Yourself	Released: 3 April 1993; Label: London; Formats: LP, CD, cassette	46	—	—	95	—	—	—	—	
Ultra Violet	Released: 21 August 1995; Label: Avex Trax; Formats: LP, CD, cassette	—	—	—	—	—	—	—	—	
Exotica	Released: 12 March 2001; Label: M6 Interactions; Formats: CD, cassette	—	—	—	—	—	—	—	—	
Drama	Released: 14 November 2005; Label: A&G; Formats: CD, digital download	169	—	—	—	—	—	—	—	
Viva	Released: 14 September 2009; Label: Fascination; Formats: LP, CD, digital download	87	—	—	—	—	—	—	—	
In Stereo	Released: 19 April 2019; Label: In Synk; Formats: LP, CD, digital download	29	— (Note: In Stereo did not enter the ARIA Albums Chart, but peaked at number 23 on the ARIA Digital Album Chart.)	—	—	—	—	—	—	
Masquerade	Released: 22 July 2022; Label: In Synk; Formats: LP, CD, cassette, digital download	22	83	—	—	—	—	—	— (Note: "Masquerade" did not enter the Billboard 200, but peaked at number 99 on the Top Current Albums Sales chart.)	
"—" denotes a recording that did not chart or was not released in that territory.

=== Live albums ===
Title	Details
Live at the London Eventim Hammersmith Apollo	Released: 14 September 2018; Label: Live Here Now; Formats: CD, DVD, coloured vinyl, digital download
Live in Stereo	Released: 1 November 2019; Label: In Synk; Formats: CD, digital download, streaming
Glorious – Live in London	Released: 9 May 2025; Label: In Synk; Formats: LP, CD, digital download, streaming

=== Compilation albums ===
List of compilation albums, with selected chart positions and certifications
Title	Details	Peak chart positions							Certifications
Title	Details	UK	AUS	CAN	GER	NZ	SWE	US	Certifications
The Greatest Hits Collection	Released: October 1988; Label: London; Formats: LP, CD, cassette	3	21	68	43	7	43	151	BPI: 3× Platinum; ARIA: Platinum
The Greatest Remixes Collection	Released: 1990; Label: PolyGram; Formats: LP, CD, cassette	—	—	—	—	—	—	—	
Bunch of Hits	Released: 13 March 1993; Label: Spectrum; Formats: CD, cassette	—	—	—	—	—	—	—	
Master Series	Released: 1 April 1996; Label: London; Format: CD	—	—	—	—	—	—	—	
The Very Best of Bananarama	Released: 15 October 2001; Label: Warner Strategic Marketing, London; Format: CD	43	—	—	—	—	—	—	BPI: Silver
The Essentials	Released: 18 June 2002; Label: Rhino; Format: CD	—	—	—	—	—	—	—	
Venus and Other Hits	Released: 10 October 2003; Label: Flashback; Format: CD	—	—	—	—	—	—	—	
Really Saying Something: The Platinum Collection	Released: 27 September 2005; Label: Warner Strategic Marketing; Formats: CD, digital download	—	—	—	—	—	—	—	
The Twelve Inches of Bananarama	Released: 2 October 2006; Label: Rhino; Formats: CD, digital download	—	—	—	—	—	—	—	
Drama Remixes Volume One	Released: 10 October 2006; Label: The Lab; Format: CD	—	—	—	—	—	—	—	
Greatest Hits & More More More	Released: 7 May 2007; Label: Warner Music TV; Formats: CD, digital download	61	—	—	—	—	—	—	
The Works	Released: 5 November 2007; Label: Rhino; Formats: 3-CD, digital download	—	—	—	—	—	—	—	
Bananarama: The Collection	Released: 12 December 2011; Label: Rhino; Formats: 2-CD, digital download	—	—	—	—	—	—	—	
30 Years of Bananarama	Released: 9 July 2012; Label: Rhino; Formats: CD + DVD, digital download	62	—	—	—	—	—	—	
Megarama: The Mixes	Released: 16 March 2015; Label: Edsel; Formats: 3-CD, digital download	98	—	—	—	—	—	—	
In a Bunch: The Singles 1981–1993	Released: 28 August 2015; Label: Edsel, Rhino; Formats: 33-CD, digital download	—	—	—	—	—	—	—	
Glorious: The Ultimate Collection	Released: 8 March 2024; Label: London; Formats: 2×CD, 3×CD, 3×LP, digital download	30	—	—	—	—	—	—	
"—" denotes a recording that did not chart or was not released in that territory.

== Extended plays ==
List of extended plays, with selected chart positions
Title	Details	Peak chart positions	
Title	Details	US Sales	US Dance Sales
The 12″ Mixes (Note: Released only in Australia.)	Released: 30 August 1991; Label: Liberation; Formats: CD, cassette	—	—
Now or Never	Released: 25 September 2012; Label: In a Bunch; Format: Digital download	11	4
"—" denotes a recording that did not chart or was not released in that territory.

== Singles ==
=== As lead artist ===
List of singles as lead artist, with selected chart positions and certifications, showing year released and album name
Title	Year	Peak chart positions										Certifications	Album
Title	Year	UK	AUS	BEL (FL)	GER	IRE	NL	NZ	SWI	US	US Dance	Certifications	Album
"Aie a Mwana"	1981	92	—	—	—	—	—	—	—	—	66		Deep Sea Skiving
"It Ain't What You Do (It's the Way That You Do It)" (with Fun Boy Three)	1982	4	55	3	—	5	3	37	—	—	49	BPI: Silver	Fun Boy Three
"Really Saying Something" (featuring Fun Boy Three)	1982	5	74	7	—	9	16	—	—	— (Note: "Really Saying Something" did not enter the Billboard Hot 100, but peaked at number 8 on the Bubbling Under Hot 100 Singles chart.)	16	BPI: Silver	Deep Sea Skiving
"Shy Boy"	1982	4	2	6	—	8	12	5	—	83	14	BPI: Silver	Deep Sea Skiving
"Cheers Then"	1982	45	—	—	—	—	—	—	—	—	—		Deep Sea Skiving
"Na Na Hey Hey Kiss Him Goodbye"	1983	5	38	29	—	4	—	29	—	— (Note: "Na Na Hey Hey Kiss Him Goodbye" did not enter the Billboard Hot 100, but peaked at number 1 on the Bubbling Under Hot 100 Singles chart.)	—		Deep Sea Skiving
"Cruel Summer"	1983	8	32	40	24	7	48	32	—	9	11		Bananarama
"Robert De Niro's Waiting..."	1984	3	40	34	7	8	22	—	8	95	—	BPI: Silver	Bananarama
"Rough Justice"	1984	23	—	19	63	24	16	—	—	—	—		Bananarama
"Hot Line to Heaven"	1984	58	—	—	—	—	—	—	—	—	—		Bananarama
"The Wild Life"	1984	—	—	—	—	—	—	—	—	70	—		Bananarama
"Do Not Disturb"	1985	31	—	—	—	22	—	—	—	—	—		True Confessions
"Venus"	1986	8	1	6	2	12	5	1	1	1	1	BPI: Silver; MC: Platinum	True Confessions
"More Than Physical"	1986	41	28	—	38	25	—	—	—	73	5		True Confessions
"A Trick of the Night"	1987	32	99	—	—	24	—	—	—	76	39		True Confessions
"I Heard a Rumour"	1987	14	32	27	37	9	16	8	10	4	3		Wow!
"Love in the First Degree"	1987	3	5	9	21	6	12	11	18	48	10	BPI: Silver	Wow!
"I Can't Help It"	1987	20	27	13	31	12	30	—	—	47	7		Wow!
"I Want You Back"	1988	5	3	40	29	3	49	10	23	—	—		Wow!
"Love, Truth and Honesty"	1988	23	32	—	42	12	87	20	25	89	26		The Greatest Hits Collection
"Nathan Jones"	1988	15	59	22	—	16	73	22	—	—	—		The Greatest Hits Collection
"Help!" (featuring Lananeeneenoonoo)	1989	3	25	9	8	2	24	35	8	—	—	BPI: Silver	The Greatest Hits Collection
"Cruel Summer '89"	1989	19	158	—	24	16	—	—	22	—	—	BPI: Gold	Non-album single
"Only Your Love"	1990	27	51	—	—	—	—	49	—	—	—		Pop Life
"Preacher Man"	1990	20	147	40	46	11	—	—	—	—			Pop Life
"Long Train Running"	1991	30	179	47	45	18	—	—	—	—	—		Pop Life
"Tripping on Your Love"	1991	76	—	—	—	—	—	—	—	—	14		Pop Life
"Movin' On"	1992	24	177	33	52	—	34	—	—	—	—		Please Yourself
"Last Thing on My Mind"	1992	71	—	—	63	—	47	—	—	—	—		Please Yourself
"More, More, More"	1993	24	—	—	65	16	—	—	—	—	—		Please Yourself
"Every Shade of Blue"	1995	—	124	—	—	—	—	—	—	—	41		Ultra Violet
"Take Me to Your Heart"	1995	—	180	—	—	—	—	—	—	—	—		Ultra Violet
"Move in My Direction"	2005	14	41	25	93	—	67	—	—	—	14		Drama
"Look on the Floor (Hypnotic Tango)"	2005	26	95	—	—	—	—	—	—	—	2		Drama
"Love Comes"	2009	44	—	—	—	—	—	—	—	—	—		Viva
"Love Don't Live Here"	2010	114	—	—	—	—	—	—	—	—	—		Viva
"Baby It's Christmas"	2010	199	—	—	—	—	—	—	—	—	—		Non-album single
"Now or Never"	2012	—	—	—	—	—	—	—	—	—	—		Now or Never
"Stuff Like That"	2019	— (Note: "Stuff Like That" did not enter the UK Singles Chart, but peaked at number 22 on the UK Airplay Chart.)	—	—	—	—	—	—	—	—	—		In Stereo
"Looking for Someone"	2019	—	—	—	—	—	—	—	—	—	—		In Stereo
"Masquerade"	2022	—	—	—	—	—	—	—	—	—	—		Masquerade
"Forever Young"	2022	—	—	—	—	—	—	—	—	—	—		Masquerade
"Running with the Night"	2022	—	—	—	—	—	—	—	—	—	—		Masquerade
"Feel the Love"	2023	— (Note: "Feel the Love" did not enter the UK Singles Chart, but peaked at number 96 on the UK Singles Sales Chart.)	—	—	—	—	—	—	—	—	—		Glorious: The Ultimate Collection
"Supernova"	2024	— (Note: "Supernova" did not enter the UK Singles Chart, but peaked at number 74 on the UK Singles Sales Chart.)	—	—	—	—	—	—	—	—	—		Glorious: The Ultimate Collection
"—" denotes releases that did not chart or were not released in that territory.

=== As featured artist ===
List of singles as featured artist, with selected chart positions and certifications, showing year released and album name
Title	Year	Peak chart positions									Certifications	Album
Title	Year	UK	AUS	GER	IRE	NL	NZ	SWE	SWI	US	Certifications	Album
"Do They Know It's Christmas?" (as part of Band Aid)	1984	1	1	1	1	1	1	1	1	13	BPI: Platinum; MC: Platinum; RIAA: Gold	Non-album singles
"Let It Be" (as part of Ferry Aid)	1987	1	28	3	2	4	4	9	1	—	BPI: Gold	Non-album singles
"Do They Know It's Christmas?" (as part of Band Aid II)	1989	1	30	74	1	20	8	15	24	—	BPI: Platinum	Non-album singles
"—" denotes releases that did not chart or were not released in that territory.

=== Promotional singles ===
List of promotional singles, showing year released and album name
Title	Year	Album
"He's Got Tact"	1982	Deep Sea Skiving
"King of the Jungle"	1984	Bananarama
"Set on You"	1987	Non-album single
"Megarama '89"	1989	Non-album single
"I Found Love"	1995	Ultra Violet
"Careless Whisper"	2001	Exotica
"If"	2001	Exotica
"Dance Music"	2019	In Stereo
"Favourite"	2022	Masquerade

== Other charted songs ==
List of other charted songs, with selected chart positions, showing year released and album name
Title	Year	Peak chart positions	Album
Title	Year	RUS	Album
"Don't Step on My Groove"	2006	117	Drama
"Frequency"	2006	175	Drama

== Guest appearances ==
List of non-single guest appearances, with other performing artists, showing year released and album name
Title	Year	Other artist(s)	Album
"Sanctuary"	1982	Fun Boy Three	Fun Boy Three
"Funrama 2"	1982	Fun Boy Three	Fun Boy Three
"Alone"	1982	Fun Boy Three	Fun Boy Three
"No Feelings"	1982	None	Party Party: Original Movie Soundtrack
"Riskin' a Romance"	1987	None	The Secret of My Success: Music from the Motion Picture Soundtrack
"Waterloo"	1998	None	A Song for Eurotrash
"U R My Baby"	2002	Discobrothers	Discobrothers Presenting Stars of the Eighties
"Love, Leave, Forget"	2002	Multitude	Is Harry on the Boat?

== Videography ==
=== Video albums ===
Title	Details	Notes
And That's Not All...	Released: 15 June 1984; Label: London; Format: VHS	Includes the music videos for the singles from the albums Deep Sea Skiving and Bananarama.
The Video Singles	Released: 20 November 1987; Label: London; Format: VHS	Includes four music videos for the singles from the album True Confessions.
The Greatest Hits Collection	Released: 14 October 1988; Label: London; Formats: VHS, VCD	Compilation of Bananarama's videos until 1988.
30 Years of Bananarama	Released: 9 July 2012; Label: London; Formats: DVD, digital download	Compilation of 35 videos of Bananarama.
Glorious - Live In London	Released: 9 May 2026; Label: In Synk; Formats: DVD, digital download	Includes a recording of one of their tour dates at the London Palladium.

=== Music videos ===
Year	Title	Album
1982	"Really Saying Something" (with Fun Boy Three)	Deep Sea Skiving
1982	"Shy Boy"	Deep Sea Skiving
1982	"Cheers Then"	Deep Sea Skiving
1982	"Na Na Hey Hey Kiss Him Goodbye"	Deep Sea Skiving
1983	"Cruel Summer"	Bananarama
1983	"Robert De Niro's Waiting..."	Bananarama
1984	"Rough Justice"	Bananarama
1984	"Hot Line to Heaven"	Bananarama
1984	"The Wild Life"	Bananarama
1984	"State I'm In"	Bananarama
1985	"Do Not Disturb"	True Confessions
1986	"Venus"	True Confessions
1986	"More Than Physical"	True Confessions
1986	"A Trick of the Night"	True Confessions
1987	"I Heard a Rumour"	Wow!
1987	"Love in the First Degree"	Wow!
1987	"I Can't Help It" (original and extended versions)	Wow!
1988	"I Want You Back" (2 versions)	Wow!
1988	"Love, Truth and Honestly"	The Greatest Hits Collection
1988	"Nathan Jones"	The Greatest Hits Collection
1989	"Help!" (with Lananeeneenoonoo)	The Greatest Hits Collection
1989	"Cruel Summer '89"	non-album
1989	"Megarama '89"	non-album
1990	"Only Your Love"	Pop Life
1990	"Preacher Man"	Pop Life
1991	"Long Train Running"	Pop Life
1991	"Tripping on Your Love"	Pop Life
1992	"Movin' On"	Please Yourself
1992	"Last Thing on My Mind"	Please Yourself
1993	"More, More, More"	Please Yourself
1995	"I Found Love"	Ultra Violet / I Found Love
1995	"Every Shade of Blue"	Ultra Violet
1995	"Take Me to Your Heart"	Ultra Violet
1998	"Waterloo"	A Song for Eurotrash
2001	"Careless Whisper"	Exotica
2005	"Move in My Direction"	Drama
2005	"Look on the Floor (Hypnotic Tango)"	Drama
2009	"Love Comes"	Viva
2010	"Love Don't Live Here"	Viva
2010	"Here Comes the Rain"	Viva Deluxe Expanded Edition
2019	"Stuff Like That"	In Stereo
2022	"Masquerade"	Masquerade

=== Collaborations in music videos ===
Year	Title	Other Performer	Album
1982	"It Ain't What You Do (It's the Way That You Do It)"	Fun Boy Three	Fun Boy Three
1984	"Do They Know It's Christmas?"	Band Aid (various artists)	non-album
1987	"Let It Be"	Ferry Aid (various artists)	non-album
1989	"Do They Know It's Christmas?"	Band Aid II (various artists)	non-album
