= And That's Not All... =

Video by Bananarama
- Released: 1984
- Genre: Pop; new wave
- Length: 33 mins approx
- Label: London
- Director: Keef; Duncan Gibbins; Midge Ure; Chris Cross; Jonathan Gershfield

Bananarama chronology
And That's Not All... (1984)	The Video Singles (1987)

And That's Not All... is a Bananarama videos compilation from 1984, which features the music videos that were to the singles from the albums Deep Sea Skiving (1983) and Bananarama (1984). The video also featured two additional tracks, "The Wild Life", a US-only non-album single, and the Bananarama album track "State I'm In", which was slated for a single release but was later cancelled. The video also featured snippets and behind the scenes footage of the girls.

== Videos ==
1. "Robert De Niro's Waiting..."
  Directed by Duncan Gibbins
2. "Really Saying Something"
  Directed by Midge Ure & Chris Cross
3. "Shy Boy"
  Directed by Midge Ure & Chris Cross
4. "Cheers Then"
  Directed by Keef
5. "Na Na Hey Hey (Kiss Him Goodbye)"
  Directed by Keef
6. "Cruel Summer"
7. "Rough Justice"
  Directed by Jonathan Gershfield
8. "State I'm In"
  Directed by Jonathan Gershfield
9. "Hot Line To Heaven"
  Directed by Jonathan Gershfield
10. "The Wild Life"
