= The Essentials (Bananarama album) =

Greatest hits album by Bananarama
- Released: 18 June 2002
- Recorded: 1982–1998
- Genre: Pop rock, new wave, dance-pop
- Label: Rhino Records
- Producer: Swain & Jolley, Stock Aiken & Waterman, Dallin, Fahey, Woodward, O'Sullivan, Fun Boy Three, Dave Jordan, Little Paul Cook, Big John Martin

Bananarama chronology
The Very Best of Bananarama (2001)	The Essentials (2002)	Venus and Other Hits (2003)

Professional ratings
Review scores
Source	Rating
AllMusic	4/5 stars

The Essentials is one of several greatest hits collections by Bananarama. This compilation was only released in the US by Rhino Records' Essentials series. Within the same year, WEA issued The Very Best of Bananarama to mark the group's twentieth anniversary.

The compilation only includes the group's singles that charted inside the Billboard Hot 100 or the Bubbling Under Hot 100 Singles except for their 1987 single "I Can't Help It". The track list is therefore the most comprehensive compilation of the group's most popular hits in the USA. Only one song featured in this collection was recorded after the departure of group member Siobhan Fahey: 1988's "Love, Truth and Honesty", which originally appeared on their Greatest Hits Collection. In addition, "The Wild Life", a rare soundtrack single which briefly appeared on their second album Bananarama, was included on compact disc for the first time. In addition, the versions of "Really Saying Something" and "Shy Boy" that appear on this compilation are the U.S. 7" mixes, which differ from the ones released in Europe.

== Track listing ==
1. "Really Saying Something" (with Fun Boy Three)
2. "Shy Boy"
3. "Robert De Niro's Waiting..."
4. "Cruel Summer"
5. "The Wild Life"
6. "Venus"
7. "More Than Physical"
8. "A Trick of the Night"
9. "I Heard a Rumour"
10. "Love in the First Degree"
11. "Love, Truth and Honesty"
12. "Na Na Hey Hey Kiss Him Goodbye"
