= Bunch of Hits =

Greatest hits album by Bananarama
- Released: 13 March 1993
- Recorded: 1981–1991
- Genre: Pop, new wave
- Label: Spectrum
- Producer: Swain & Jolley, Stock Aiken & Waterman, Dallin, Fahey, Woodward, O'Sullivan, Fun Boy Three, Dave Jordan, Little Paul Cook, Big John Martin

Bananarama chronology
Please Yourself (1993)	Bunch of Hits (1993)	Ultra Violet / I Found Love (1995)

Alternative cover
- UK reissue cover (1998)

Professional ratings
Review scores
Source	Rating
AllMusic	link
Music Week	3/5 stars

Bunch of Hits is a greatest hits album by the English group Bananarama, released on 13 March 1993 by Spectrum Music. It contains many of the same tracks found on the 1989 hits set Greatest Hits Collection, plus several album tracks. Bananarama's two biggest singles are absent: "Cruel Summer" and "Venus". It also includes two B-sides available for the first time on CD, "Scarlett" and "Ghost". This album was not released by the group's record label London Records. The album was released with different artwork and titles in other countries, such as Pop Giants (1997, Germany), Collection Series (1997, Australia), Robert De Niro's Waiting (1999, Netherlands) and also saw a re-release with different artwork in the UK in 1998.

== Track listing ==
1. "Love in the First Degree" (Aitken, Dallin, Fahey, Stock) – 3:29
2. "Bad for Me" (Aitken, Dallin, Fahey, Stock) – 3:36
3. "I Heard a Rumour" (Aitken, Dallin, Fahey, Stock) – 3:25
4. "Ain't No Cure" (Aitken, Dallin, Stock) – 3:24
5. "I Can't Let You Go" (Caine, Dallin, Youth) – 6:11
6. "Hooked on Love" (Dallin, Fahey, Jolley, Swain) – 3:48
7. "Young at Heart" (Dallin, Fahey, Hodgens) – 3:10
8. "Robert De Niro's Waiting..." (Dallin, Fahey, Jolley, Swain) – 3:30
9. "Hot Line to Heaven" (Jolley, Swain) (album edit version) – 3:51
10. "Dance with a Stranger" (Dallin, Fahey, Jolley, Swain) – 4:28
11. "Scarlett" (Bishop, Dallin, Fahey, Seymour) – 4:13
12. "Ghost" (Bishop, Dallin, Fahey, Seymour) – 4:05
13. "Rough Justice" (Dallin, Fahey, Jolley, Swain) – 3:37
14. "Cheers Then" (Dallin, Fahey, Martin, Sharpe) – 3:26
