= 30 Years of Bananarama =

Greatest hits album by Bananarama
- Released: 9 July 2012
- Recorded: 1981–2009
- Genres: Pop, dance, new wave
- Label: Rhino

Bananarama chronology
Viva (2009)	30 Years of Bananarama (2012)	Now or Never (2012)

30 Years of Bananarama is a CD/DVD retrospective from the English girl group Bananarama's musical career from 1981 through 2009. This compilation album was issued by Rhino Records on 9 July 2012 to celebrate the 30th anniversary of the group. The album entered the UK album chart on 16 July at number 62.

The CD features Bananarama's 22 best-known singles, from their 1981 debut, "Aie a Mwana", to their 2009 effort, "Love Don't Live Here". All songs are presented in chronological order (except the bonus tracks on digital) with most of them being their album versions. The digital version includes three extra tracks "Rough Justice", "Long Train Running", and "A Trick of the Night", adding up to a total of 25 tracks.

The DVD showcases 35 music videos and marks the first time where the group's videos have been officially made available on this format.

== Track listing ==
=== CD: The Sound ===
1. "Aie a Mwana"
2. "Really Saying Something" (with Fun Boy Three)
3. "Shy Boy"
4. "Na Na Hey Hey Kiss Him Goodbye"
5. "Cruel Summer"
6. "Robert De Niro's Waiting..."
7. "Venus"
8. "I Heard a Rumour"
9. "Love in the First Degree"
10. "I Can't Help It"
11. "I Want You Back"
12. "Love, Truth and Honesty"
13. "Nathan Jones"
14. "Help!" (featuring Lananeeneenoonoo)
15. "Only Your Love"
16. "Preacher Man"
17. "Movin' On"
18. "Every Shade of Blue"
19. "Move in My Direction"
20. "Look on the Floor (Hypnotic Tango)"
21. "Love Comes"
22. "Love Don't Live Here"
23. "Rough Justice" (digital only)
24. "Long Train Running" (digital only)
25. "A Trick of the Night" (digital only)

=== DVD: The Vision ===
1. "Really Saying Something"
2. "Shy Boy"
3. "Cheers Then"
4. "Na Na Hey Hey Kiss Him Goodbye"
5. "Cruel Summer"
6. "Robert De Niro's Waiting"
7. "Rough Justice"
8. "Hotline To Heaven"
9. "The Wild Life"
10. "Do Not Disturb"
11. "Venus"
12. "More Than Physical"
13. "A Trick Of The Night"
14. "I Heard A Rumour"
15. "Love In The First Degree"
16. "I Can't Help It"
17. "I Want You Back"
18. "Love Truth & Honesty"
19. "Nathan Jones"
20. "Help!"
21. "Only Your Love"
22. "Preacher Man"
23. "Long Train Running"
24. "Tripping On Your Love"
25. "Movin' On"
26. "Last Thing On My Mind"
27. "More More More"
28. "Every Shade Of Blue"
29. "Take Me To Your Heart"
30. "Move In My Direction"
31. "Look On The Floor"
32. "Love Comes"
33. "Love Don't Live Here"
34. "Venus" (12")
35. "I Can't Help It" (12")

== Charts ==
Chart (2012)	Peak position
UK Albums (Official Charts)	62
