= Master Series (Bananarama album) =

Greatest hits album by Bananarama
- Released: 1996
- Recorded: 1981–1993
- Genre: Pop, new wave, dance-pop
- Label: PolyGram
- Producer: Swain & Jolley, Stock Aiken & Waterman, Dallin, Fahey, Woodward, O'Sullivan, Fun Boy Three, Dave Jordan, Little Paul Cook, Big John Martin, Youth

Bananarama chronology
Ultra Violet / I Found Love (1995)	Master Series (1996)	Exotica (2001)

Alternative cover
- German re-issue cover (1998)

Professional ratings
Review scores
Source	Rating
AllMusic	link

French issue (1998)

Master Series is a greatest hits compilation by the English group Bananarama. It was released in 1996 and contained a mixture of Bananarama singles and album tracks. It includes material from 1983-1993. First released in 1996 in continental Europe and Brazil, it saw a re-release in 1998 in Germany and France with different artwork on both. The European and Brazilian versions differ in that the European release includes the single mix of "Movin' On", whereas the Brazilian release has the album version. For collectors, Master Series also includes for the first time on a Bananarama album the UK single version of "More Than Physical", an edit of the song True Confessions which was used in the film PI: Private Investigations, and a non-segued album track "Dream Baby" from Bananarama.

== Track listing ==
1. "I Heard a Rumour"
2. "I Can't Help It"
3. "Movin' On"
4. "Give It All Up for Love"
5. "Last Thing on My Mind"
6. "Robert De Niro's Waiting..."
7. "Through a Child's Eyes"
8. "Young at Heart"
9. "Dream Baby"
10. "State I'm In"
11. "More Than Physical"
12. "Doctor Love"
13. "True Confessions" (edit)
14. "I Can't Let You Go"
15. "Outta Sight"
