= The Video Singles =

Video by Bananarama
- Released: 1987
- Genre: Pop; rock
- Length: 16 mins approx
- Label: London; Channel 5
- Director: Simon Milne; Peter Care

Bananarama chronology
And That's Not All... (1984)	The Video Singles (1987)	The Greatest Hits Collection (1988)

The Video Singles is a music video compilation by Bananarama, released by Channel 5 in 1987, featuring videos which had been made to accompany the four singles taken from the True Confessions album. The "Venus" video is the 7" version, the extended version featuring instead on The Greatest Hits Collection. "A Trick of the Night" is the U.S. version: this song has two different videos, namely the UK black-and-white version, and the U.S. colour version; the UK b/w version was directed by Paul Heiney for the BBC programme, In at the Deep End. Bananarama hated this video. The other two videos included in the collection were for "Do Not Disturb" and "More Than Physical".

The video for "Do Not Disturb", the one track entirely produced by Jolley & Swain, was directed by Simon Milne, whereas the videos for the three songs produced by Stock, Aitken & Waterman (though "A Trick of the Night" was also produced by Jolley & Swain in its original album version) were all directed by Peter Care.

== Track listing ==
1. "Do Not Disturb" (24 August 1985)
  Directed by Simon Milne
2. "Venus" (31 May 1986)
  Directed by Peter Care
3. "More Than Physical" (16 August 1986)
  Directed by Peter Care
4. "A Trick of the Night" (14 February 1987)
  Directed by Peter Care
