= G-A-Y (album) =

2000 compilation album

Compilation album by Various Artists
- Released: 3 July 2000 (UK)
- Genre: Dance-pop
- Label: London Records

G-A-Y was a 40-track compilation album which was released by London Records in the UK on Monday 3 July 2000. The album featured songs by 40 different artists who had appeared at London club G-A-Y, and was released on CD and cassette.

== Promotion ==
The G-A-Y album was heavily promoted in both the gay and mainstream media. TV commercials ran on music channels such as MTV and The Box, as well as on terrestrial television channel, Channel 4. A nationwide poster campaign took place, and advertisements were placed in the gay and teen press, appearing in such publications as Gay Times and Smash Hits. Commercials also ran on national radio in the weeks prior to release.

On Saturday 1 July 2000, a show was held at G-A-Y to promote the release of the album. Seven acts who appeared on the album performed. These acts were Shola Ama, All Saints, Bananarama, Dina Carroll, Honeyz and Louise. Each act performed only one song, apart from Louise, who also performed her new single "2 Faced".

== Track listing ==
1. Geri Halliwell - "G.A.Y"
2. Kylie Minogue - "Better the Devil You Know
3. Steps - "Love's Got a Hold on My Heart"
4. Spice Girls - "Wannabe"
5. All Saints - "Pure Shores"
6. Boyzone - "No Matter What"
7. Westlife - "Swear It Again"
8. Five - "Keep On Movin'"
9. S Club 7 - "S Club Party"
10. Vengaboys - "Boom, Boom, Boom, Boom!!"
11. A1 - "Ready Or Not"
12. Tin Tin Out featuring Emma Bunton - "What I Am"
13. Billie Piper - "Honey To The Bee"
14. B*Witched - "C'est La Vie"
15. Honeyz - "Won't Take It Lying Down"
16. Alice Deejay - "Back In My Life"
17. Mousse T. vs Hot 'N' Juicy - "Horny '98"
18. The Tamperer featuring Maya - "Feel It"
19. Ant & Dec - "Let's Get Ready To Rumble"
20. RuPaul - "Supermodel (You Better Work)"
21. Gloria Gaynor - "I Will Survive"
22. Donna Summer - "Bad Girls"
23. Gabrielle - "Rise"
24. Louise - "Naked"
25. Gina G - "Ooh Aah... Just a Little Bit"
26. Dana International - "Diva"
27. Nicki French - "Don't Play That Song Again"
28. Dannii Minogue - "This Is It"
29. Dina Carroll - "Ain't No Man"
30. Martine McCutcheon - "Perfect Moment"
31. Debbie Harry - "French Kissin'"
32. Bananarama - "Robert De Niro's Waiting..." (2000 version)
33. Belinda Carlisle - "Heaven Is A Place On Earth"
34. The Human League - "Don't You Want Me"
35. Sister Sledge - "Frankie"
36. Michelle Gayle - "Do You Know"
37. Shola Ama - "You Might Need Somebody"
38. Republica - "Drop Dead Gorgeous"
39. East 17 - "Stay Another Day"
40. Alison Moyet - "There Are Worse Things I Could Do"

== Charts ==
Chart performance for G-A-Y
| Chart (2013) | Peak position |
|---|---|
| UK Compilation Albums (OCC) | 5 |
