= The Very Best of Bananarama =

Greatest hits album by Bananarama
- Released: 15 October 2001
- Recorded: 1981–2001
- Genre: Pop; new wave; dance-pop
- Label: Warner Strategic Marketing; London
- Producer: Swain & Jolley, Stock Aiken & Waterman, Dallin, Fahey, Woodward, O'Sullivan, Fun Boy Three, Dave Jordan, Little Paul Cook, Big John Martin, Youth

Bananarama chronology
Exotica (2001)	The Very Best of Bananarama (2001)	The Essentials (2002)

Professional ratings
Review scores
Source	Rating
AllMusic	4.5/5 stars

The Very Best of Bananarama is a greatest hits album by the English group Bananarama, released on 15 October 2001 by Warner Strategic Marketing and London Records. It was released to celebrate the group's 20th anniversary, including their singles released from 1981 to 1993. The album reached number 43 on the UK Albums Chart.

This compilation features the single versions of the songs. Various tracks had been edited or remixed from their original album versions for their releases as singles and in the case of "I Want You Back" and "Nathan Jones", the vocals were re-recorded after original member Siobhan Fahey had left the group and been replaced by Jacquie O'Sullivan.

A limited 'Collector's Edition' of The Very Best of Bananarama released in 2002, containing a second disc of remixes. This special edition of the compilation also replaced "Tempus Fugit Megamix" with the 'Miami Mix' of "I Heard a Rumour".

== Track listing ==
Standard Edition

1. "Venus"
2. "Love in the First Degree"
3. "Robert De Niro's Waiting"
4. "I Heard a Rumour"
5. "Cruel Summer"
6. "Na Na Hey Hey (Kiss Him Goodbye)"
7. "'Tain't What You Do (It's the Way That You Do It)" (with Fun Boy Three)
8. "Really Saying Something" (with Fun Boy Three)
9. "I Want You Back"
10. "Nathan Jones"
11. "Shy Boy"
12. "More, More, More"
13. "Only Your Love"
14. "I Can't Help It"
15. "Love, Truth and Honesty"
16. "Rough Justice"
17. "Last Thing on My Mind"
18. "Long Train Running"
19. "Preacher Man"
20. "Movin' On"
21. "Help!" (with Lananeeneenoonoo)
22. "Tempus Fugit Megamix"

Collector's Edition

Disc One

1. "Venus"
2. "Love in the First Degree"
3. "Robert De Niro's Waiting"
4. "I Heard a Rumour"
5. "Cruel Summer"
6. "Na Na Hey Hey (Kiss Him Goodbye)"
7. "It Ain't What You Do It's the Way That You Do It" (with Fun Boy Three)
8. "Really Saying Something" (with Fun Boy Three)
9. "I Want You Back"
10. "Nathan Jones"
11. "Shy Boy"
12. "More, More, More"
13. "Only Your Love"
14. "I Can't Help It"
15. "Love, Truth and Honesty"
16. "Rough Justice"
17. "Last Thing on My Mind"
18. "Long Train Running"
19. "Preacher Man"
20. "Movin' On"
21. "Help!" (with Lananeeneenoonoo)
22. "I Heard a Rumour" (Miami Mix)

Disc Two

1. "Venus" (Hellfire Mix)
2. "Love in the First Degree" (Eurobeat Style)
3. "Movin' On" (Bumpin' Mix)
4. "Cruel Summer" (Swing Beat Dub)
5. "Only Your Love" (Milky Bar Mix)
6. "Tripping on Your Love" (Euro Trance Mix)
7. "I Want You Back" (Extended European Mix)
8. "Nathan Jones" (1988 Extended Version)
9. "I Can't Help It" (Extended Club Mix)

== Charts ==
Chart (2001)	Peak position
Scottish Albums (OCC)	49
UK Albums (OCC)	43
