= Whenever You're Near Me =

1998 single by Ace of Base

Single by Ace of Base

from the album Cruel Summer
- B-side: "He Decides"
- Released: 6 October 1998
- Genre: Pop
- Length: 3:32
- Label: Arista
- Songwriters: Mike Chapman; Jonas Berggren
- Producer: Ole Evenrude

Ace of Base singles chronology
"Cruel Summer" (1998)	"Whenever You're Near Me" (1998)	"Travel to Romantis" (1998)

"Whenever You're Near Me" is a song by Swedish group Ace of Base, released as the second single from their third American record, Cruel Summer (1998). The original version of the song, "Life Is a Flower", was a huge hit in Europe and Japan. The lyrics were rewritten by song composer Mike Chapman and the song was produced by Norwegian producer Ole Evenrude. It was released to radio stations in North and South America on October 6, 1998 by Arista Records. This version peaked at number 76 in the United States and number 51 in Canada; it was the band's last charting hit in both countries.

== Critical reception ==
Larry Flick from Billboard magazine wrote that the song "shows Ace Of Base revisiting the more familiar pop/reggae sound that made the group a top 40 favorite." He noted that the track "builds upon a bankable sound rather than mimicking it. The song has a decidedly more complex arrangement, which is rife with sunny Caribbean percussion and a sweet smattering of acoustic guitar/synth interplay." He also added that Jenny's and Linn's vocals are "notably more restrained here than on past singles, which allows the melody and chorus to work their contagious magic without vocal overkill. Downright irresistible, this cute single should saturate airwaves within seconds." Gary Shipes from The Stuart News complimented songs like "Whenever You're Near Me" and "Adventures in Paradise" as "pristine pop productions worthy of ABBA and Trevor Horn's '80s confections for Buggles, Dollar and Frankie Goes to Hollywood."

== Track listing ==
- CD singles
1. Whenever You're Near Me
2. He Decides (Fisher Version aka American Album Version)
- CD Maxi
1. Whenever You're Near Me (Album Version)
2. Whenever You're Near Me (Strobe's Radio Mix)
3. Whenever You're Near Me (Strobe's Lollipop Mix)
4. Whenever You're Near Me (Nikolas & Sibley Dance Radio Edit)
5. Whenever You're Near Me (Nikolas & Sibley Dance Mix)
6. Whenever You're Near Me (Strobe's Subway Mix)

== Official versions/remixes ==
- Album Version
- Giuseppe D.'s Radio Remix
- Giuseppe D.'s Radio Remix Instrumental
- Giuseppe D.'s Extended Remix
- Giuseppe D.'s Extended Remix Instrumental
- Nikolas & Sibley Dance Mix
- Nikolas & Sibley Dance Radio Edit
- Strobe's Radio Remix
- Strobe's Subway Mix
- Strobe's Lollipop Mix
- Strobe's Lollipop Mix Instrumental

== Charts ==
Chart (1999)	Peak position
Canada Top Singles (RPM)	51
US Billboard Hot 100	76
US Maxi-Singles Sales (Billboard)	12
