= Masquerade (Bananarama album) =

Studio album by Bananarama
- Released: 22 July 2022
- Length: 39:01
- Label: In Synk
- Producer: Ian Masterson

Bananarama chronology
In Stereo (2019)	Masquerade (2022)	Glorious: The Ultimate Collection (2024)

Singles from Masquerade
- 1. "Masquerade" Released: 15 June 2022; 2. "Forever Young" Released: 12 August 2022; 3. "Running with the Night" Released: 14 October 2022

Masquerade is the twelfth studio album by the English musical duo Bananarama. It was released on 22 July 2022 as part of the group's 40th anniversary celebrations.

The album was originally conceived as an EP, but following the cancellation of the group's live shows throughout 2020 due to the COVID-19 pandemic, it developed into a full-length album. In addition to working with longtime collaborator Ian Masterson, Sara Dallin also co-wrote tracks with her daughter, Alice Dallin-Walker, known professionally as Alice D.

"Favourite" was released on 29 April 2022 as a "taster track". The track is a cover of an Alice D song, as is the album track "Brand New", and features Alice on background vocals. The single was added to the B-list of the BBC Radio 2 playlist and made 'Single of the Week' upon release, before moving onto the A-list the following week.

The album's release was followed by two launch shows at London Lafayette on 3 and 4 August 2022. "Forever Young" and "Running with the Night" were subsequently released as singles. A reissue of the album, subtitled "The Unmasked Edition", was released on 7 April 2023, as a double-LP including six full-length remixes and a digital edition including edits thereof.

== Track listing ==
All tracks are written by Sara Dallin, Keren Woodward and Ian Masterson, except where noted. All tracks are produced by Ian Masterson.

Standard edition
No.	Title	Writer(s)	Length
1.	"Favourite"	Alice Dallin-Walker; Oscar Scheller	3:07
2.	"Stay Wild"		3:47
3.	"Velvet Lies"	Dallin; Dallin-Walker; Masterson	2:47
4.	"Masquerade"		4:13
5.	"Running with the Night"		3:28
6.	"Bad Love"	Dallin; Dallin-Walker; Masterson	3:00
7.	"Let's Go Outside"		3:45
8.	"Brand New"	Dallin-Walker; James Mackenzie Robinson	3:32
9.	"Need a Little More Time"		3:35
10.	"Forever Young"	Dallin; Dallin-Walker; Masterson	3:34
11.	"Waiting for the Sun to Shine"		4:13
Total length:			39:01

The Unmasked Edition digital bonus tracks
No.	Title	Writer(s)	Length
12.	"Running with the Night" (Almighty remix edit)		3:25
13.	"Forever Young" (Lamentis remix edit)	Dallin; Dallin-Walker; Masterson	3:53
14.	"Favourite" (Shanghai Surprize remix edit)	Dallin-Walker; Scheller	2:54
15.	"Masquerade" (Cahill & DTAG remix edit)		3:29
16.	"Velvet Lies" (Sebastian Perez remix edit)	Dallin; Dallin-Walker; Masterson	2:54
17.	"Stay Wild" (Until Dawn remix edit)		3:39
Total length:			59:23

The Unmasked Edition bonus LP
No.	Title	Writer(s)	Length
12.	"Running with the Night" (Almighty remix)		5:36
13.	"Forever Young" (Lamentis remix)	Dallin; Dallin-Walker; Masterson	4:50
14.	"Favourite" (Shanghai Surprize remix)	Dallin-Walker; Scheller	5:03
15.	"Masquerade" (Cahill & DTAG remix)		5:02
16.	"Velvet Lies" (Sebastian Perez remix)	Dallin; Dallin-Walker; Masterson	4:14
17.	"Stay Wild" (Until Dawn remix)		5:48

== Charts ==
Chart performance for Masquerade
Chart (2022)	Peak position
Australian Albums (ARIA)	83
Belgian Albums (Ultratop Flanders)	130
Scottish Albums (OCC)	6
UK Albums (OCC)	22
UK Independent Albums (OCC)	2
US Top Album Sales (Billboard)	99
