= In Stereo (Bananarama album) =

Studio album by Bananarama
- Released: 19 April 2019
- Genres: Pop; dance
- Length: 36:32
- Label: In Synk
- Producers: Ian Masterson; Richard X

Bananarama chronology
Now or Never (2012)	In Stereo (2019)	Masquerade (2022)

Singles from In Stereo
- 1. "Stuff Like That" Released: 7 March 2019; 2. "Looking for Someone" Released: 24 May 2019

In Stereo ratings
Review scores
Source	Rating
Albumism	4/5 stars
AllMusic	3/5 stars
Classic Pop	8/10
The Guardian	3/5 stars
The Young Folks	6/10

In Stereo is the eleventh studio album by the English musical duo Bananarama. It was released on 19 April 2019 and was the group's first full-length release in 10 years.

"Dance Music" was released on 18 January 2019 as a promotional single to launch the album campaign. "Stuff Like That" was released on 7 March 2019 as the lead single. The song was added to the A-List of the BBC Radio 2 playlist, and reached number 22 on the UK Airplay Chart for the week ending 11 April 2019. The music video for "Stuff Like That" saw Bananarama reunite with director and long-time collaborator Andy Morahan, who hadn't directed any of their music videos since "Preacher Man" in 1990.

It was confirmed on 19 May 2019 via Twitter that "Looking for Someone" would be released as the album's second single on 24 May 2019.

The opening track, "Love in Stereo", is a song that was originally written and recorded by British girl group the Sugababes, who later gave it to Bananarama.

The album entered at number 29 on the UK Albums Chart, and the UK Independent Albums Chart at 5. It also peaked at number 23 on the Australian Digital Album Chart.

== Track listing ==
All tracks are written by Sara Dallin, Keren Woodward and Ian Masterson, except where noted. All tracks are produced by Masterson, except where noted.

In Stereo track listing
No.	Title	Writer(s)	Producer(s)	Length
1.	"Love in Stereo"	Hannah Robinson; Richard X; Keisha Buchanan; Siobhan Donaghy	Richard X; Robinson^{[a]}	3:54
2.	"Dance Music"			4:03
3.	"I'm on Fire"			3:33
4.	"Intoxicated"			4:06
5.	"Tonight"	Dallin; Woodward; Rod Thomas		4:19
6.	"Looking for Someone"			3:11
7.	"Stuff Like That"			3:23
8.	"It's Gonna Be Alright"			3:22
9.	"Got to Get Away"			3:11
10.	"On Your Own"			3:30
Total length:				36:32

=== Notes ===
- ^{^[a]} signifies a vocal producer

== Charts ==
Chart performance for In Stereo
Chart (2019)	Peak position
Australian Digital Albums (ARIA)	23
Scottish Albums (Official Charts)	15
UK Albums (Official Charts)	29
UK Independent Albums (Official Charts)	5
