= Tripping on Your Love =

Single by Bananarama

from the album Pop Life
- Released: 22 July 1991
- Genre: Dance
- Length: 3:21 (album version); 3:15 (single mix)
- Label: London
- Songwriters: Sara Dallin; Andy Caine; Youth; Schrogger
- Producer: Youth

Bananarama singles chronology
"Long Train Running" (1991)	"Tripping on Your Love" (1991)	"Movin' On" (1992)

Music video
- "Tripping on Your Love" on YouTube

"Tripping on Your Love" is a song recorded by the English girl group Bananarama. It appears on the group's fifth studio album, Pop Life (1991), and was released by London Records as the album's fourth single in the UK and the first single in the United States. The track was co-written and produced by Youth. This is the last single released featuring member Jacquie O'Sullivan and the group as a trio.

The single is considered by Bananarama to be their biggest commercial flop in the UK, just missing the top 75 of the UK Singles Chart. It was originally intended to be the album's second single (following "Only Your Love") but was delayed as two different songs were released as singles. By the time "Tripping on Your Love" was issued, O'Sullivan had announced her departure from the group, and Bananarama's long-time manager Hillary Shaw also quit. In addition, group member Sara Dallin was pregnant with her first child, which made promotion nearly impossible.

The song is a fusion of acid house, South Asian, rap, and Caribbean music. The album version was remixed by Robin Hancock before it was released as a single. It was not included on the original version of The Very Best of Bananarama, but a remix was included on a special edition bonus CD of the compilation. The song boasts the most commissioned remixes of any Bananarama single (20 mixes by nine different remixers, including George Michael).

The single's biggest success came in US dance clubs, climbing to number 14 on the Hot Dance Club Play chart in December 1991. It would be Bananarama's last appearance on that chart until 2006 when "Look on the Floor (Hypnotic Tango)" peaked at number two.

In 2007, member Keren Woodward said she considered the song to be one of the band's best.

== Critical reception ==
Stewart Mason from AllMusic said the song "is actually pretty good". Larry Flick from Billboard magazine described it as a "percolating dance ditty", noting its "impressive remixes" by George Michael and Steve "Silk" Hurley. He added, "It's a winner". Andy Kastanas from The Charlotte Observer wrote, "This particular cut has an island flair coupled with some riveting male reggae-rap vocals. Nevertheless, the main influence here is the psychedelic sound of the '70s. Sound like an unusual combo? Check it out." Barbara Ellen from NME said, "After all this time they're still as bright, silly and fresh as the first moment they popped out of one of Terry Hall's wet dreams. 'Tripping', however, is not camp enough to be one of their best." Kenny Thomas reviewed the song for Smash Hits, commenting, "I like the Indian sitar sound at the beginning and the reggae toasting bit. That was quite innovative and then it went straight into Bananarama."

== Music video ==
The accompanying music video for the song was directed by Eric Watson. It features Bananarama performing the song in slow-moving cinematography on a beach dune, in front of a house, and in a car, sometimes accompanied by a man. As Sara Dallin was pregnant at the time, she was shot only from the shoulder upwards.

== Track listing ==
- UK CD single
1. "Tripping on Your Love" (single mix) – 3:15
2. "Tripping on Your Love" (Euro trance mix) – 7:21
  Remixed by Robin Hancock
3. "Tripping on Your Love" (The Loveable Love Dove Caper) – 6:26
- CD promo single
1. "Tripping on Your Love" (Euro trance mix) – 7:21
  Remixed by Robin Hancock
2. "Tripping on Your Love" (Indika dub mix)
3. "Only Your Love" (Hardcore instrumental)
- Promo remixes 1
1. "Tripping on Your Love" (Silky Soul 70's mix) – 6:24
2. "Tripping on Your Love" (Silky dub) – 5:17
  Remixed by Steve "Silk" Hurley
3. "Tripping on Your Love" (E-Smoove Chant mix) – 7:06
  Remixed by E-Smoove
4. "Tripping on Your Love" (Maurice Wicked mix) – 6:20
5. "Tripping on Your Love" (Maurice dub mix) – 8:12
  Remixed by Maurice Joshua
6. "Tripping on Your Love" (Sturm mix) – 3:59
  Remixed by Larry Sturm
- Promo remixes 2
1. "Tripping on Your Love" (Silky Soul 70's mix) – 6:24
2. "Tripping on Your Love" (Silky dub) – 5:17
  Remixed by Steve "Silk" Hurley
3. "Tripping on Your Love" (E-Smoove Chant mix) – 7:06
  Remixed by E-Smoove
4. "Tripping on Your Love" (Maurice Wicked mix) – 6:20
  Remixed by Maurice Joshua
5. "Tripping on Your Love" (Euro trance mix) – 7:21
  Remixed by Robin Hancock
6. "Tripping on Your Love" (George Michael Metropolis mix) – 3:37
  Remixed by George Michael
- UK CD promo single NANXDJ 22
1. "Tripping on Your Love" (Euro trance mix) – 7:21
  Remixed by Robin Hancock
2. "Tripping on Your Love" (Indika dub mix)
3. "Tripping on Your Love" (instrumental)
- Other versions
1. "Tripping on Your Love" (album version) – 3:21
2. "Tripping on Your Love" (Sweet Exorcist mix)
3. "Tripping on Your Love" (Sweet Exorcist dub)
  Remixed by Sweet Exorcist

== Personnel ==
Bananarama

- Sara Dallin – vocals
- Jacquie O'Sullivan – vocals
- Keren Woodward – vocals

== Charts ==
Chart (1991)	Peak position
UK Singles (OCC)	76
UK Airplay (Music Week)	55
US Dance Club Songs (Billboard)	14
