= The Wild Life (film) =

1984 film directed by Art Linson

- Theatrical release poster
- Directed by: Art Linson
- Written by: Cameron Crowe
- Produced by: Cameron Crowe; Art Linson
- Starring: Christopher Penn; Lea Thompson; Ilan Mitchell-Smith; Jenny Wright; Eric Stoltz; Rick Moranis; Hart Bochner; Randy Quaid
- Cinematography: James Glennon
- Edited by: Michael Jablow
- Music by: Edward Van Halen; Donn Landee
- Distributed by: Universal Pictures
- Release date: September 28, 1984
- Running time: 96 minutes
- Country: United States
- Language: English
- Budget: $6 million
- Box office: $11 million

The Wild Life is a 1984 American coming-of-age comedy film directed by Art Linson and written by Cameron Crowe. The film stars Chris Penn, Lea Thompson, Ilan Mitchell-Smith, Jenny Wright, Eric Stoltz, Rick Moranis, Hart Bochner, and Randy Quaid.

The Wild Life was theatrically released in the United States on September 28, 1984, by Universal Pictures. While the film is not a direct sequel to Fast Times at Ridgemont High (1982), it was seen by many as a spiritual sequel due to Crowe's involvement in both and the films' shared universe/style of being R-rated comedy/dramas set amongst young people finding their way in Southern California.

== Plot summary ==
The plot concerns three teenagers living in the suburbs of Los Angeles. Bill has just graduated from high school and got his first apartment. His younger brother Jim, who is fixated on Vietnam and the Vietnam war, spends a lot of time practicing with his Nunchakus, getting high, listening to heavy metal on his boombox, and hanging out with Vietnam vet Charlie. Other important characters include Tom, a hedonistic high school wrestling champion who works with Bill at a bowling alley; Harry, a trendy department store manager; Anita, Bill's ex-girlfriend who works at a donut shop; and Eileen, Anita's friend and Tommy's girlfriend who works at the department store with Harry. Anita has a fling with a cop named David, who, unknown to Anita, is married. The three boys set out for a night of fun and craziness at a strip bar and later on have a party at Bill's apartment.

== Cast ==
- Eric Stoltz as Bill Conrad
- Christopher Penn as Tom Drake
- Ilan Mitchell-Smith as Jim Conrad
- Jenny Wright as Eileen
- Lea Thompson as Anita
- Rick Moranis as Harry
- Hart Bochner as David Curtiss
- Randy Quaid as Charlie
- Brin Berliner as Tony
- Susan Blackstone as Donna
- Cari Anne Warder as Julie
- Robert Ridgely as Craig Davis
- Jack Kehoe as Mr. Parker
- Simone White as Brenda
- Beth McKinley as Robin
- Michael Bowen as Vince
- Ángel Salazar as Benny
- Dick Rude as Eddie
- Robert Chestnut as Eddie's Friend
- Reginald Farmer as Reggie
- Sherilyn Fenn as Penny Harlin
- Leo Penn as Mr. Drake
- Hildy Brooks as Mrs. Conrad
- Lee Ving as Installer
- Dean Devlin as Liquor Store Clerk
- Nancy Wilson as Mrs. Curtiss
- Ben Stein as Surplus Salesman
- Keone Young as Japanese Bowler
- Kevin Peter Hall as the Bouncer
- Ashley St. John as Stripper #1
- Kitten Natividad as Stripper #2
- Danny Tucker as Cop #1
- Cameron Crowe as Cop #2
- Ronnie Wood as Refrigerator Raider
- Tommy Swerdlow as Dork
- Tony Epper as Redneck Drunk #1
- Ted White as Redneck Drunk #2
- Gary Riley as Kid #1

== Production ==
The film followed on from the success of Fast Times at Ridgemount High which had been written by Cameron Crowe, produced by Art Linson and directed by Amy Heckerling. For The Wild Life Crowe and Linson would produce and Linson would direct.

Cameron Crowe wanted to write a film about The Doors. He did that for a few months then lost enthusiasm "and realized that what I really wanted to write about was the fascination a kid might have for the 1960s and someone like Jim Morrison." Filming started 6 February 1984.

Crowe called the film "a misfire. In an attempt not to do a sequel to Fast Times, we did a movie that was aggressively not a sequel. The movie should be what it is and not be something else. The Wild Life was another movie about young people that did not have the same loving touch that Amy Heckerling brought to it."

Crowe called it "a disaster. Not that I started out to write a script about women who take their tops off, but it sure ended up that way. It wound up being what `Fast Times' was a reaction against - an exploitative view of youth. That effectively took me back further than I was when I started."

However, James L. Brooks admired the movie which led to him collaborating with Crowe on Say Anything.

== Soundtrack ==
"The Wild Life" is a song written and performed by English female pop music vocal group Bananarama. It was composed for and included in the movie and on its soundtrack. The single peaked at number 70 on the Billboard Hot 100 in December 1984.

Eddie Van Halen wrote and performed the score for the film, but was unable to finish mixing due to Van Halen's touring schedule, and left that task to the band's long-term engineer Donn Landee. The instrumental "Donut City" was the only Eddie Van Halen track appearing on the official soundtrack album. The instrumental "Out The Window" from Eddie Van Halen's score was later used during the "Darth Vader" scene in Back to the Future the following year. The film also featured an early version of Van Halen's 1992 song, “Right Now”.

The film's soundtrack album also contained newly recorded music by Andy Summers and Charlie Sexton & Ronnie Wood. The soundtrack of the film itself further contained music by Prince, Madonna, Little Richard, Van Halen, Billy Idol, Steppenwolf, and Jimi Hendrix, with the requisite licensing fees having prevented The Wild Life from receiving an uncut release on DVD. Universal formerly offered a made-to-order disc in its Vault series, with many of the songs removed.

When Universal created the alternate soundtrack for VHS/Laserdisc/TV broadcast, they also revised the end credits and removed the songs that were replaced on the soundtrack. Universal's "Vault Series" DVD-R did not use these revised end credits even though it used the alternate soundtrack.

In later releases, the HD broadcast version has all of the songs intact.

== See also ==
- List of American films of 1984
