= Ian Masterson =

- Also known as: Trouser Enthusiasts; Flexifingers; Monoboy; Thriller Jill; Konkrete
- Born: Ian Kenneth Masterson; Belfast, Northern Ireland
- Genres: Pop, dance
- Occupations: Producer, songwriter
- Years active: 1990s–present
- Website: http://www.ianmasterson.net

Ian Kenneth Masterson is a British media composer, electronic musician and pop producer.

== Biography ==
Since the early 1990s, he has produced and remixed songs for a range of pop acts including Dannii Minogue, Geri Halliwell, Kylie Minogue, Girls Aloud, Sheena Easton, Atomic Kitten, Bananarama, Sophie Ellis-Bextor, Lorie and the Pet Shop Boys.

Masterson has worked extensively in film and television producing score work for both the BBC and Channel 4, as well as for independent production companies. He is currently part of the production team Thriller Jill, alongside long-time friend Terry Ronald.

== Filmography ==
=== Television ===
Title	Description	Year
Some Girls	Theme music for the series	2012
Concrete Circus	Score for documentary	2011
Beautiful People (Series 2)	Theme music for the series	2009
Beautiful People (Series 1)	Theme music for the series	2008
The Secrets of the 12 Disciples	Score for documentary	2008
Gay Vicars	Score for TV show	2006
The Big Art Project	Score for TV show	2006
Operation Muslim Vote	Score for TV documentary	2006
Life and Death in Rome	Theme music for documentary	2005
Jump Britain	Score for TV documentary	2005
Head Jam	Soundtrack for TV quiz show	2004
The Real Little Britain	Score for TV documentary	2004
Lives Less Ordinary	Score for TV documentary	2002
Is Harry on the Boat	Score for TV drama	2001
Around the World in 80 Raves	Score for TV documentary	2001
