= The Wild Life (song) =

Single by Bananarama

from the album Bananarama and The Wild Life soundtrack
- Released: 15 October 1984 (US)
- Recorded: January 1984
- Genre: Pop
- Length: 3:17 (single version); 3:50 (album version)
- Label: London Records
- Songwriters: Sara Dallin; Siobhan Fahey; Keren Woodward; Jolley & Swain
- Producers: Jolley & Swain

Bananarama singles chronology
"Hot Line to Heaven" (1984)	"The Wild Life" (1984)	"Do Not Disturb" (1985)

"The Wild Life" is a song written and performed by the English girl group Bananarama. Written in two days, the track was composed for and included in the 1984 American film of the same name The Wild Life (starring Christopher Penn), and on its soundtrack. Bananarama's second, self-titled album had already been in stores for several months when this single was issued, and for a time the album was re-released with "The Wild Life" included. The song was released as a single in the U.S., Canada, Australia, and Japan. The UK was instead given the song "Hot Line to Heaven" as the album's final single.

"The Wild Life" peaked at number 70 on the U.S. Billboard Hot 100 and did not chart in any other countries. The Bananarama track listing was reverted to its original sequence shortly thereafter and "The Wild Life" did not appear on CD until the 2002 hits package The Essentials.

== Music video ==
The music video was in light rotation on MTV in autumn 1984. It features the girls performing the song in a studio filled with colourful fabrics that they play around with. Their footage is intercut with excerpts from the film and photographs of the group members.

This video marked a break with their earlier work as it didn't attempt to create a storyline, and focused on them performing the song, accompanied by various images.

== Reception ==
Cash Box magazine said "Again spotlighting vocal layering and a big production sound, this track features a minor key melody which is perfect for Bananarama's harmonic interaction and it is also another potentially big dance favourite. Sure to get important exposure from the film, 'The Wild Life' should be another top- charting Single for the group, with special appeal on hit radio and new music formats."

== Track listings ==
USA / Canada / Japan / Australia 7-inch vinyl single

USA: London Records 882 019-7 / Canada: London Records LDS 218 / Australia: Liberation Records LS 1430

1. "The Wild Life" 3:17
2. "State I'm In" 2:44

USA / Canada 12" vinyl single

USA: London Records 882 019-1

1. "The Wild Life" 3:17
2. "State I'm In" (Extended Version) 2:48
3. "The Wild Life" (Dub Mix) 7:07

== Charts ==
Chart (1984)	Peak position	Date
U.S. Billboard Hot 100	70	December 1984
