= A Trick of the Night =

Single by Bananarama

from the album True Confessions
- B-side: "A Cut Above the Rest"; "Set on You"
- Released: December 1986 (US); 2 February 1987 (UK)
- Recorded: September 1985
- Genre: Pop
- Length: 4:40 (Album Version); 4:22 (US Single Version); 4:06 (Single Version)
- Label: London Records
- Songwriter: Jolley & Swain
- Producers: Jolley & Swain

Bananarama singles chronology
"More Than Physical" (1986)	"A Trick of the Night" / "Set on You" (1986)	"I Heard a Rumour" (1987)

"A Trick of the Night" is a mid-tempo ballad recorded by the English girl group Bananarama. It was written and produced by Steve Jolley and Tony Swain and released as the final single from Bananarama's album True Confessions.

The song was re-recorded for UK single release, with new synthesizer tracks and vocal arrangement by the Stock Aitken Waterman (SAW) production trio, at the request of London Records for the UK release. The song was included on the CD version of Greatest Hits Collection as a bonus track; it was not included on the vinyl version nor their 2001 compilation The Very Best of Bananarama.

The Number One Mix, the single remix, and related variations interpolated the music of Princess' "Say I'm Your Number One". Lyrics from the Number One Mix, were sampled on Bananarama's "I Heard a Rumour" B-side song "Clean-Cut Boy".

== Background ==
The band named the track as their favourite song from True Confessions, but its release was deprioritized behind "More Than Physical", due to the record company's concerns about the act's ability to chart strongly with a ballad.

The cautionary message in the lyrics are directed towards a male friend who has left home to seek his fortune in the big city but is experiencing challenges and facing the prospect of becoming a rentboy.

== Music video ==
Two videos were filmed for the song. The North American version, directed by Peter Care, featured Bananarama singing the song in a house at night, with their images projected on to movie screens.

The release of the single in the UK was delayed until February 1987, so that Bananarama could participate in a BBC television show called In at the Deep End. Each week Chris Serle or Paul Heiney would have to master a new skill - in this case, Paul Heiney had to master the art of directing a pop music video (the episode was similar to MTV's Making the Video programme) for this song. Group members Sara Dallin, Siobhan Fahey and Keren Woodward hated the final product. “The video is just the worst," said Sarah. "I don’t want people to think this is our idea of a good video."

== Critical reception ==
Jane Wilkes of Record Mirror criticized the fact that the whole song sounds like an intro and "never really seems to get off the ground", which makes the record "basically dull". In another issue of the same magazine, James Hamilton found "dreary" the 7-inch version, but praised the 12-inch version which "revived their old trick, making the first half of this (0-)105 1/2 bpm jiggler sounds exactly like Princess' "Say I'm Your Number One", instrumental for ages before any real vocal begins". Wayne Hussey of Smash Hits panned the song, stating it was a "shame" and "just standard Americanised disco fodder", as the band's "usual pop swagger is not evident here".

== Chart performance ==
"A Trick of the Night" was a top-40 hit in the UK, peaking at number 32. The SAW-remixed version received the most airplay in their home country, which allowed the song to reach number 12 on the European Airplay Top 50 where it charted for five weeks, while the ballad version stalled at number 76 on the U.S. Billboard Hot 100. The single spent one week in the Australian Kent Music Report top 100 singles chart, where it peaked at number 99. "A Trick of the Night" peaked at number 24 in Ireland.

== Track listings ==
US 7-inch London Records/Polygram 886 119-7

1. "A Trick of the Night" (US Single version) 4:22
2. "A Cut Above the Rest" (Album version) 3:40 S. Jolley/T. Swain/S. Dallin/S. Fahey/K. Woodward

US 12-inch single 886 119-1

1. "A Trick of the Night" (The Number One Mix) - (8:13)
  Remixed by Stock/Aitken/Waterman
2. "A Trick of the Night" (Tricky Mix) - (7:15)
  Remixed by Jolley & Swain
3. "A Trick of the Night" (Dub Mix) - (4:31)
  Remixed by Stock/Aitken/Waterman

UK 7-inch single NANA12

1. "A Trick of the Night" (Single Version) 4:06
  Available on the CD album The Greatest Hits Collection
2. "A Trick of the Night" (Tricky Mix - Edit)

UK 7-inch EP single NANEP12

1. "A Trick of the Night" (Single Version) 4:06
2. "A Cut Above the Rest" 3:40
3. "A Trick of the Night" (Alternative 7-inch Number One Edit) 4:27
4. "Set on You" 3:56
  M. Stock/M. Aitken/P. Waterman/S. Dallin/S. Fahey/K. Woodward

UK 7-inch picture disc NANPD12

1. "A Trick of the Night" (Single Version) 4:06
2. "A Trick of the Night" (Tricky Mix - Edit)

UK 12-inch single NANX12

1. "A Trick of the Night" (The Number One Mix) 8:14
  Available on the CD album The Twelve Inches of Bananarama
2. "A Trick of the Night" (Tricky Mix) 7:15
3. "Set on You" 3:56

UK promo 12-inch single NANDJ 12

1. "A Trick of the Night" (Dub Mix) 4:31
2. "A Trick of the Night" (Instrumental) 4:13 #:Remixed by Stock/Aitken/Waterman

Other versions

1. "A Trick of the Night" (Album Version) - (4:38)
  Taken from the album True Confessions
2. "A Trick of the Night" (UK Video Version) - (4:20)
  Available on the remastered 2007 True Confessions but mistakenly listed as (Single Version)
3. "A Trick of the Night" (US Video Version) - (4:14)

== Personnel ==
Bananarama

- Sara Dallin - Vocals
- Siobhan Fahey - Vocals
- Keren Woodward - Vocals

Additional musicians

- Tony Swain – keyboards
- Steve Jolley – guitar
- Keith Thomas – sax

== Charts ==
Weekly chart performance for "A Trick of the Night"
Chart (1987)	Peak position
Australia (Australian Music Report)	99
Europe (European Hot 100 Singles)	95
Europe (European Airplay Top 50)	12
Ireland (IRMA)	24
Luxembourg (Radio Luxembourg)	26
Quebec (ADISQ)	38
UK Singles (Official Charts)	32
US Billboard Hot 100	76
US Dance Club Songs (Billboard)	39
US Dance Singles Sales (Billboard)	39
US Cash Box Top 100	71

== Popular culture ==
- It was included on the soundtrack to the 1986 American film Jumpin' Jack Flash.
