= Hot Line to Heaven =

Single by Bananarama

from the album Bananarama
- B-side: "State I'm In"
- Released: 12 November 1984
- Recorded: November 1983
- Genre: Pop
- Length: 7:19 (Album Version); 3:40 (7" Version)
- Label: London Records
- Songwriters: Sara Dallin; Siobhan Fahey; Keren Woodward; Jolley & Swain
- Producers: Jolley & Swain

Bananarama singles chronology
"King of the Jungle" (1984)	"Hot Line to Heaven" (1984)	"The Wild Life" (1984)

"Hot Line to Heaven" is a song co-written and performed by the English girl group Bananarama. The song appears on their second, self-titled album and was released as a single in the UK in 1984.

In its album version, "Hot Line to Heaven" is a seven-minute-plus mid-tempo pop song. It was edited to about three-and-a-half minutes for its single release. After Bananarama recorded the soundtrack song "The Wild Life" (from the film of the same name), the edited version of "Hot Line to Heaven" was pressed onto the Bananarama album to make room for the late addition of "The Wild Life". This was only a temporary pressing, however, as Bananarama's track listing was restored several months later, with the full version of "Hot Line to Heaven" intact.

The single did not perform well on the charts and got very limited release outside the UK. As was the case with the Bananarama album, the dark lyrical content did not meet with mainstream acceptance, and it became the group's lowest-charting UK single since their debut "Aie a Mwana". It was the fourth release from the album.

== Music video ==
The music video features the girls trying to persuade a record executive to be interested in their demo tapes. They annoy him by playing their tape and dancing around his office until the executive loses his cool and throws them out. When the girls show up as angels in his hallucinations, he finally relents.

== Critical reception ==
Upon the release Barney Hoskyns of New Musical Express called it "first almost worthless 45 from spunkier threesome" and cast the blame upon Jolley & Swain.

== Versions ==
UK 7" vinyl single

London Records NANA 8

1. "Hot Line to Heaven (single version)" 3:40
2. "State I'm In" 2:48

UK 12" vinyl single

London Records NANX 8

1. "Hot Line to Heaven" (extended version) 7:19
2. "State I'm In" (extended version) 4:48

+ an "edited version" 3:48 of "Hot Line to Heaven (album version)" was released on the compilation album "Bananarama - Bunch of Hits". This was also the version released on the 2007 re-issue of the "Bananarama" album incorrectly titled as the "7-inch mix"

Some versions of the 7-inch came shrinkwrapped with a jigsaw of the front cover NANAJ 8

== Charts ==
Chart (1984)	Peak position
UK Singles Chart	58
