= Bananarama (album) =

- Cover photography by Peter Ashworth

Studio album by Bananarama
- Released: 20 April 1984
- Genres: Dance-pop; new wave
- Length: 34:12
- Label: London
- Producers: Steve Jolley; Tony Swain

Bananarama chronology
Deep Sea Skiving (1983)	Bananarama (1984)	True Confessions (1986)

Singles from Bananarama
- 1. "Cruel Summer" Released: 27 June 1983; 2. "Robert De Niro's Waiting..." Released: 24 February 1984; 3. "Rough Justice" Released: 14 May 1984; 4. "The Wild Life" Released: 15 October 1984; 5. "Hot Line to Heaven" Released: 9 November 1984

Bananarama is the second studio album by the English pop group Bananarama, released on 20 April 1984 by London Records. It peaked at number 16 on the UK Albums Chart and was certified silver by the British Phonographic Industry (BPI).

== Background and recording ==
For their second album, Bananarama continued their association with the duo Jolley & Swain, who had produced three tracks on the group's 1983 debut album Deep Sea Skiving. Compared to Deep Sea Skiving, which mixed Sara Dallin, Siobhan Fahey and Keren Woodward's self-penned songs with covers and material from outside writers, Bananarama saw the trio take on a much larger role in songwriting. With the exception of "Dream Baby" (originally written by Cindy Ecstasy and B-Movie's Rick Holliday for their Six Sed Red project), the whole album was written by Bananarama in collaboration with Jolley & Swain. The group had been frustrated by incorrect and, in their view, misogynistic perceptions that their songs had all been written by their producers.

Lyrically, Bananarama found the group delving into more mature and socially conscious territory on several songs, with subject matter including drug addiction ("Hot Line to Heaven") and domestic violence ("King of the Jungle"), as well as the killing of the group's friend Thomas "Kidso" Reilly (who receives a dedication on the album sleeve) in Northern Ireland amidst the Troubles ("Rough Justice").

== Release ==
Bananarama was released on 20 April 1984 by London Records, peaking at number 16 on the UK Albums Chart. The original vinyl release came in an embossed sleeve and was packaged with a poster which included song lyrics, a photo of each member of the group, and the message: "Well, a year is a long time, people change & maybe we have too – hopefully for the better! Anyway here are results of our hard work over the past twelve months. This is for you – we hope you like it. Best Wishes, love Keren X, All the best, love Sarah x, and Lots of love, Siobhan xx".

Preceding the album's release, "Cruel Summer" was issued as the lead single from Bananarama and peaked at number eight on the UK Singles Chart in July 1983, while second single "Robert De Niro's Waiting..." followed in February 1984, reaching number three. Two further singles, "Rough Justice" and "Hot Line to Heaven", charted at numbers 23 and 58 respectively. Bolstered by its inclusion in the 1984 film The Karate Kid, "Cruel Summer" charted in the United States a year after its initial release and gave Bananarama their first significant success in the country, reaching number nine on the Billboard Hot 100. "The Wild Life", recorded for the film of the same name, was included on later US editions of Bananarama and released as a single, peaking at number 70 on the Hot 100. Music videos were produced for all five singles, as well as the song "State I'm In".

== Critical reception ==
Professional ratings
Review scores
Source	Rating
AllMusic	4/5 stars
Classic Pop	4/5 stars
Number One	3/5
The Philadelphia Inquirer	3/5 stars
Record Mirror	3.5/5 stars
The Rolling Stone Album Guide	3/5 stars
Smash Hits	6 1/2/10
Spin Alternative Record Guide	5/10
Stylus Magazine	B
The Village Voice	B−

At the time of the album's release, Creem critic Mitchell Cohen described Bananarama as having "a misty feeling that's almost nostalgic. Women don't sing like this anymore, with this kind of sighing regret. The album has curves, not edges, and it's got a texture you can float on, a shine like 'Don't Worry Baby' without the harmonic intricacy. With their waif-like, wafer-thin pipes, Keren, Siobhan and Sarah ... sound dazed, as though someone roused them from sleep and stuck them behind a mike." Andy Strike of Record Mirror felt that Bananarama remained limited as vocalists, but that Jolley & Swain "answer this problem by all but burying the vocals under a creamy topping of drums, guitar and synth". Dave Rimmer commented in Smash Hits that despite some "gloomy moments" on the album, "overall they seem to have found their feet."

Retrospectively, AllMusic's Stewart Mason found that while Jolley & Swain's production on Bananarama eschewed the more unique sound of Deep Sea Skiving for a "more polished feel", the album is nonetheless distinguished by its "surprisingly serious" lyrics; noting the group's return to lighter lyrical themes on subsequent albums, he summarised Bananarama as "an intriguing and often excellent side trip." For Classic Pop, Alistair Powell wrote that with its "glossier, more grown-up production" and particularly its lyrics, the album "demanded [the group] be taken seriously".

== Track listing ==
All tracks are written by Sara Dallin, Siobhan Fahey, Keren Woodward, Steve Jolley and Tony Swain, except where noted.

Standard CD, LP and cassette versions
No.	Title	Writer(s)	Length
1.	"Cruel Summer"		3:35
2.	"Rough Justice"		5:07
3.	"King of the Jungle"		3:28
4.	"Dream Baby"	Cindy Ecstasy; Rick Holliday	3:01
5.	"Link"		1:31
6.	"Hot Line to Heaven"		7:19
7.	"State I'm In"		2:48
8.	"Robert De Niro's Waiting..."		3:43
9.	"Through a Child's Eyes"		3:40
Total length:			34:12

1984 US LP and cassette reissues
No.	Title	Length
1.	"Cruel Summer"	3:35
2.	"Rough Justice"	5:07
3.	"King of the Jungle"	3:28
4.	"Dream Baby"	3:01
5.	"Link"	1:31
6.	"The Wild Life" (album version)	3:50
7.	"Hot Line to Heaven" (single version)	3:50
8.	"State I'm In"	2:48
9.	"Robert De Niro's Waiting..."	3:43
10.	"Through a Child's Eyes"	3:40
Total length:		34:33

2007 CD reissue
No.	Title	Writer(s)	Length
1.	"Cruel Summer"		3:35
2.	"Rough Justice"		5:07
3.	"King of the Jungle"		3:28
4.	"Dream Baby"		3:01
5.	"Link"		1:31
6.	"Hot Line to Heaven"		7:19
7.	"State I'm In"		2:48
8.	"Robert De Niro's Waiting..."		3:43
9.	"Through a Child's Eyes"		3:40
10.	"Cairo"	John Sandosa	3:44
11.	"Push!"		4:10
12.	"Rough Justice" (single version)		3:38
13.	"Live Now"		3:04
14.	"Hot Line to Heaven" (album edit version)		3:54
15.	"The Wild Life" (album version)		3:50

2013 deluxe edition CD/DVD reissue – Disc one
No.	Title	Length
1.	"Cruel Summer"	3:35
2.	"Rough Justice"	5:04
3.	"King of the Jungle"	3:26
4.	"Dream Baby"	3:08
5.	"Link"	1:30
6.	"Hot Line to Heaven"	7:16
7.	"State I'm In"	2:45
8.	"Robert De Niro's Waiting..."	3:42
9.	"Through a Child's Eyes"	3:39
10.	"The Wild Life" (album version)	3:54
11.	"Cairo"	3:46
12.	"Push!"	4:08
13.	"Live Now"	3:05
14.	"Cruel Summer" (12" version)	4:55
15.	"Robert De Niro's Waiting..." (extended version)	5:42
16.	"Rough Justice" (extended version)	5:20
17.	"The Wild Life" (extended version)	6:23
18.	"Cruel Summer '89" (Swing Beat dub)	5:17

2013 deluxe edition CD/DVD reissue – Disc two
No.	Title	Length
1.	"Cruel Summer '89" (Swing Beat version)	3:21
2.	"Robert De Niro's Waiting..." (7" version)	3:29
3.	"Rough Justice" (7" version)	3:38
4.	"Hot Line to Heaven" (7" version)	3:45
5.	"The Wild Life" (7" version)	3:17
6.	"Cruel Summer" (Cruel dub)	3:27
7.	"Rough Justice" (original 12" mix)	6:40
8.	"King of the Jungle" (unsegued version)	3:18
9.	"Dream Baby" (unsegued version)	3:08
10.	"Push!" (extended version)	5:55
11.	"State I'm In" (extended version)	4:37
12.	"The Wild Life" (dub version)	7:04
13.	"Cruel Summer" (Summer dub)	5:13
14.	"State I'm In" (instrumental)	3:07
15.	"The Wild Life" (instrumental)	4:06
16.	"Cruel Summer '89" (Swing Beat instrumental)	5:02

2013 deluxe edition CD/DVD reissue – DVD

1. "Cruel Summer" – music video (directed by Brian Simmons)
2. "Robert De Niro's Waiting..." – music video (directed by Duncan Gibbins)
3. "Rough Justice" – music video (directed by Jonathan Gershfield)
4. "Hot Line to Heaven" – music video (directed by Jonathan Gershfield)
5. "State I'm In" – music video (directed by Jonathan Gershfield)
6. "The Wild Life" – music video
7. "Cruel Summer '89" – music video
8. "Cruel Summer" – performance on Top of the Pops
9. "Robert De Niro's Waiting..." – performance on The Russell Harty Show
10. "Rough Justice" – performance on Top of the Pops
11. "Michael Row the Boat Ashore" – performance on Saturday Superstore

Some mid-1980s US LP and CD versions

- "Link" was not identified as an individual track on original LP issues, and an alternative version had originally appeared, also uncredited, preceding "Push!" on the B-side of the 12" of "Robert De Niro's Waiting...".

== Personnel ==
Credits are adapted from the album's liner notes.

Bananarama

- Sara Dallin – vocals
- Siobhan Fahey – vocals
- Keren Woodward – vocals

Production

- Steve Jolley – production, arrangement
- Tony Swain – production, arrangement
- Howie Weinberg – mastering (at Masterdisk; US edition)

Design

- Da Gama/Rama – design
- Peter Ashworth – photography

== Charts ==
Chart (1984)	Peak position
Australian Albums (Kent Music Report)	99
Dutch Albums (Album Top 100)	15
European Albums (Music & Media)	72
German Albums (Offizielle Top 100)	45
Japanese Albums (Oricon)	78
Swiss Albums (Schweizer Hitparade)	9
UK Albums (Official Charts)	16
US Billboard 200	30
Zimbabwean Albums (ZIMA)	15

== Certifications ==
Region	Certification	Certified units/sales
United Kingdom (BPI)	Silver	60,000^{^}
^{^} Shipments figures based on certification alone.
