= Cruel Summer (Bananarama song) =

1983 single by Bananarama

- Picture sleeve for European and Australasian 7-inch releases

Single by Bananarama

from the album Bananarama
- B-side: "Cairo"
- Released: 27 June 1983
- Genre: New wave; synth-pop; electropop; dance-pop
- Length: 3:35 (album version); 4:55 (extended version)
- Label: London
- Songwriters: Sara Dallin; Siobhan Fahey; Steve Jolley; Tony Swain; Keren Woodward
- Producer: Jolley & Swain

Bananarama singles chronology
"Na Na Hey Hey Kiss Him Goodbye" (1983)	"Cruel Summer" (1983)	"Robert De Niro's Waiting..." (1984)
"Help!" (1989)	"Cruel Summer '89" (1989)	"Megarama '89" (1989)

Music video
- "Cruel Summer" on YouTube

Music video
- "Cruel Summer '89" on YouTube

"Cruel Summer" is a song by the English girl group Bananarama. It was written by Bananarama, Steve Jolley, and Tony Swain, and produced by Jolley and Swain. Released in 1983, it was initially a stand-alone single but was subsequently included on their self-titled second album a year later. The song reached number eight on the UK Singles Chart in 1983 and the group appeared on the BBC's Top of the Pops that summer (July 1983), and after its inclusion in the 1984 film The Karate Kid, it reached number nine on the US Billboard Hot 100. Frequently performed in Bananarama's live sets since, it is considered as one of their signature songs.

Bananarama singer Sara Dallin said the song "played on the darker side (of summer songs): it looked at the oppressive heat, the misery of wanting to be with someone as the summer ticked by". The lyrics were inspired by how, unlike their friends, the members of Bananarama could not go on their annual summer holiday because of all the promotion they needed to do following their recent success.

It was ranked number 44 on VH1's 100 Greatest Songs of the '80s. Billboard named the song number 13 on their list of the "100 Greatest Girl Group Songs of All Time".

== History ==
"Cruel Summer" was an immediate success when it was released in the UK, reaching number eight on the UK Singles Chart, and the group performed the song live on the BBC's Top of the Pops in July 1983. Its international popularity soared after its inclusion in the 1984 feature film The Karate Kid; this was a year after the song's original release (the song was released in 1984 in the US). The group did not allow the song to be included on the film's soundtrack album, but it still reached number nine in the US, their first top-10 hit there. When Bananarama were still struggling to make money in their early years, they even performed the song at a beauty contest in Hawaii. The song's biggest chart success was in Luxembourg, where it peaked at number one.

The song has since been revived in various forms. It has appeared in several television commercials, and was covered by other acts, such as Ace of Base, who had an international hit with it (their version reached gold in the US). Blestenation sampled and remixed the song to make their own, also named "Cruel Summer" but with interspersed rap lyrics and altered structure; there are two edits of this song, one of which appeared on the 2002 Blue Crush soundtrack.

Since the original release of the song, Bananarama have recorded four further versions. "Cruel Summer '89" was released in 1989, and given a new jack swing makeover, featuring Dallin and Woodward's vocals as a duo for the first time. It reached number 19 on the UK Singles Chart in June. This version was not included on any Bananarama album until 2005's Really Saying Something: The Platinum Collection. Another version of the song was recorded and featured on their 2001 album Exotica. This version featured Latin instrumentation and additional lyrics, but it was not released as a single. They released another updated version in 2009, as a B-side of their single "Love Comes". In 2023, Bananarama released a new version to celebrate the song's 40th anniversary called "Cruel Summer 3AM".

== Music video ==
The music video was directed by Brian Simmons, and shot primarily in the Dumbo section of New York City's Brooklyn borough in mid-1983. It opens with a shot of Manhattan in the background, including the decade-old World Trade Center. "[It] was just an excuse to get us to the fabled city of New York for the first time," Siobhan Fahey has said. She recalled the shoot, conducted during a heatwave, as a difficult experience. "It was August, over one hundred degrees 38 °C (100 °F). Our HQ was a tavern under the Brooklyn Bridge, which had a ladies' room with a chipped mirror where we had to do our makeup." In the video, Bananarama members are depicted as working at a Texaco petrol station and are picked up by a man driving a Mack truck.

After an exhausting morning shooting in the city in brutal August heat, the band returned to the tavern for lunch. They made the acquaintance of some local dockworkers, who, upon learning of their situation, shared vials of cocaine with them. "That was our lunch," said Fahey, who had never tried the drug before. "When you watch that video, we look really tired and miserable in the scenes we shot before lunch, and then the after-lunch shots are all euphoric and manic."

The music video for the 1989 remix was a compilation of different shots from Bananarama's earlier videoclips. Notably missing are clips from the original 1983 video. Fahey is only featured in a pair of frames. Bananarama were unable to record a proper video for the song, because they were in the middle of a world tour at the time of its release.

== Track listings ==
- 7-inch vinyl single
1. "Cruel Summer" (Album Version) 3:35
2. "Cruel Summer" (Summer Dub Edited) 3:30
- 12-inch vinyl single
1. "Cruel Summer" (Extended Version) 4:55
2. "Cruel Summer" (Summer Dub) 5:15
3. "Cairo" 3:15

== "Cruel Summer '89" ==
- UK CD single
1. "Cruel Summer '89" (Swing Beat Version) 3:22
  Remixed by Blacksmith
  Also available from CD the albums The Works, Now That's What I Call Music 15 and Really Saying Something: The Platinum Collection.
2. "Venus" (The Greatest Remix Edit) 3:42
  Remixed by Phil Harding & Ian Curnow
3. "I Heard a Rumour" (Corporation of Bananarama Remix) 5:44
  Remixed by Freddy Bastone
- Japanese 3-inch CD single
1. "Cruel Summer '89" (Swing Beat Dub) 5:20
  Remixed by Blacksmith
  Also available from the CD albums The Greatest Remixes Collection and The Very Best of Bananarama.
2. "I Heard a Rumour" (Corporation of Bananarama Remix) 5:44
  Remixed by Freddy Bastone
3. "Venus" (The Greatest Remix) 7:57
  Remixed by Phil Harding and Ian Curnow

== Personnel ==
- Sara Dallin – vocals
- Keren Woodward – vocals
- Siobhan Fahey – vocals

== Song used in media ==
It was used in the movie The Karate Kid, episodes from Pretty Little Liars: Summer School and Paper Girls. It was also used for the teaser trailer for Ghostbusters: Frozen Empire.

== Charts ==
=== Weekly charts ===
Original version

Chart (1983–1985)	Peak position
Australia (Kent Music Report)	32
Belgium (Ultratop 50 Flanders)	40
Canada Top Singles (RPM)	33
Ireland (IRMA)	7
Israel (Kol Yisrael)	6
Luxembourg (Radio Luxembourg)	1
Netherlands (Dutch Top 40 Tipparade)	12
Netherlands (Single Top 100)	48
New Zealand (Recorded Music NZ)	32
South Africa (Springbok Radio)	3
UK Singles (OCC)	8
US Billboard Hot 100	9
US Adult Contemporary (Billboard)	44
US Hot Dance Club Play (Billboard)	11
West Germany (Media Control Charts)	24

"Cruel Summer '89"

Chart (1989)	Peak position
Australia (ARIA)	158
Denmark (IFPI)	11
Finland (Suomen virallinen lista)	2
Ireland (IRMA)	16
Luxembourg (Radio Luxembourg)	17
Switzerland (Schweizer Hitparade)	22
UK Singles (OCC)	19
UK Dance (Music Week)	11
West Germany (Media Control Charts)	24

=== Year-end charts ===
Original version

Chart (1984)	Rank
US Top Pop Singles (Billboard)	73

== Certifications ==
Region	Certification	Certified units/sales
United Kingdom (BPI) "Cruel Summer '89"	Gold	400,000^{‡}
^{‡} Sales+streaming figures based on certification alone.

== Ace of Base version ==
"Cruel Summer"
- Scandinavian cover

Single by Ace of Base

from the album Flowers and Cruel Summer
- B-side: "Into the Night of Blue"
- Released: 16 June 1998
- Genre: Dance-pop
- Length: 4:05 (Big bonus mix, normal version); 3:33 (Cutfather & Joe mix)
- Label: Mega
- Songwriters: Sara Dallin; Siobhan Fahey; Keren Woodward; Steve Jolley; Tony Swain
- Producers: Stephen Hague; Jonas "Joker" Berggren; Ulf "Buddha" Ekberg; Johnny Jam & Delgado

Ace of Base singles chronology
"Life Is a Flower" (1998)	"Cruel Summer" (1998)	"Whenever You're Near Me" (1998)

Music video
- "Cruel Summer" on YouTube "Cruel Summer (U.S. Version)" on YouTube "Cruel Summer (feat. Alliage)" on YouTube

In 1998, Swedish pop group Ace of Base recorded the song at the request of their German and American record labels PolyGram and Arista Records. It was released as the second single from their third album, Flowers (1998), and as the lead single from the American version of the album titled Cruel Summer. A different "dancier" version of the song (known as the Big Bonus mix on the album), produced by Stephen Hague, Jonas "Joker" Berggren, Ulf "Buddha" Ekberg, and Johnny Jam & Delgado, was released in mainland Europe. The original album version, produced by Cutfather & Joe, was released in North America and the UK.

"Cruel Summer" reached number 10 on the US Billboard Hot 100 and was certified gold. In the United Kingdom, the song reached number eight on the UK Singles Chart, matching the peak of the original Bananarama version. It also became Ace of Base's 4th and final Top 10 single in the US.

=== Critical reception ===
Quentin Harrison of Albumism described the song as an "engaging cover" in his retrospective review of Flowers, and added that "one variant is closer to the originating take, albeit with a spike of hip-hop flavor for a bit of modish spunk", while "the second rendition is a surprisingly danceable, Spanish flecked trip." AllMusic editor Stephen Thomas Erlewine named it "the melodic high point" of the Cruel Summer album. Larry Flick from Billboard magazine wrote, "The act that gave the such ABBA-esque ditties as 'All That She Wants' and 'The Sign' turns its attention toward Bananarama, faithfully covering one of that group's bigger '80s-era hits. Producers Cutfather & Joe bring a few new rhythm ideas to the table dropping the tempo to a jeep-inspired funk beat and injecting an ear-tickling keyboard twist or two. However, the vocals hold few surprises, which is exactly what fans of both Ace of Base and the original recording will want. In all, a potential smash that could keep this Swedish quartet on the front burner of top 40 radio for much of the summer." Kelly Pickerel from Daily Kent Stater said she liked this remake better than Bananarama's original, noting that "it’s also one of those songs you can never get out of your head as soon as you hear it".

Chuck Campbell from The Daily News named it a "slick-but-faithful remake". A reviewer from Entertainment Weekly commented, "It's clear what Ace of Base Svengali Jonas Berggren is aiming for — the iridescent sonic symmetry of Swedish forebears ABBA. A pretty lofty ambition. But he and his seraphic singing sisters, Linn and Jenny, actually attain ABBA's perfect pop-Euro-disco balance on this third outing. There isn't a note out of concordant place, no potential hook overlooked. Excepting the pointless title track, Berggren has done his homework. Just don't hate him because they sound so pretty." Evening Herald praised it as a gem, adding "more of the same can often be a good thing". Swedish newspaper Expressen stated that the song "shows why Ace of Base once ruled the pop world". Gary Shipes from The Stuart News found that "the bubble-gum juvenilia of the original is replaced with updated hardware and a contemporary dance arrangement that launches the arc the rest of the CD will follow. At once melancoholic and jovial, the band's driving rhythmic force leaves no option but to fill dance floors on a dime."

=== Chart performance ===
"Cruel Summer" entered the top 10 in Hungary and the United Kingdom. In the UK, the single peaked at number eight during its first week on the UK Singles Chart, on 4 October 1998. It was a top-30 hit in Austria, Germany, Iceland, Switzerland and Wallonia. It entered the top 20 on the Eurochart Hot 100, where it peaked at number 16. Outside Europe, it peaked at number two on the Canadian RPM Dance chart and number six on the RPM 100 Hit Tracks chart, as well as number 10 on both the US Billboard Hot 100 and Billboard Dance Club Play charts. It earned a gold record in the US, with shipments of 500,000 singles.

=== Music video ===
The music video for "Cruel Summer" was filmed and directed by English director Nigel Dick and was shot in Rome, Italy between 27 and 29 June 1998. There are three versions of the video:

- "Cruel Summer"
- "Cruel Summer" (Big Bonus Mix)
- "Cruel Summer" (Frenglish version featuring Alliage)

The original video and the video using the Big Bonus Mix contain identical and similar footage, whereas the Frenglish version contains completely new footage. The Big Bonus Mix video was uploaded to YouTube in January 2015; as of August 2022, it had more than 17 million views.

=== Track listings ===
- Scandinavian CD single
1. "Cruel Summer" (Big Bonus Mix) – 4:05
2. "Cruel Summer" (Cutfather & Joe Mix) – 3:33
- Scandinavian CD single
1. "Cruel Summer" (Big Bonus Mix) – 4:05
2. "Cruel Summer" (Cutfather & Joe Mix) – 3:33
3. "Cruel Summer" (Hartmann & Langhoff Radio Edit) – 3:23
4. "Cruel Summer" (Hartmann & Langhoff Club) – 7:45
5. "Into the Night of Blue" (bonus track) – 4:11
- Scandinavian CD single
1. "Cruel Summer" (KLM club Mix) – 10:27
2. "Cruel Summer" (Hani Num Club Mix) – 8:13
3. "Cruel Summer" (Soul Poets House Bust) – 3:40
4. "Cruel Summer" (Hartmann & Langhoff Club) – 7:45
- UK CD 1
1. Cutfather and Joe Mix
2. Big Bonus Mix
3. Hartmann and Langhoff Short Mix
4. Hartmann and Langhoff Club Mix
- UK CD 2
1. "Cruel Summer" (Cutfather and Joe Mix)
2. "Don't Turn Around" (The 7" Aswad Mix)
3. "Beautiful Life" (Single Version)
- US maxi CD
1. Album Version a.k.a. Cutfather and Joe Mix
2. Hani Radio Mix a.k.a. Blazin' Rhythm Remix
3. KLM Radio Mix
4. Hani Num Club Mix
5. KLM Club Mix

=== Charts ===
==== Weekly charts ====
Chart (1998)	Peak position
Australia (ARIA)	59
Austria (Ö3 Austria Top 40)	28
Belgium (Ultratip Bubbling Under Flanders)	3
Belgium (Ultratop 50 Wallonia)	27
Canada Top Singles (RPM)	6
Canada Adult Contemporary (RPM)	5
Canada Dance/Urban (RPM)	2
Europe (Eurochart Hot 100)	16
Europe (MTV European Top 20)	6
Finland (Suomen virallinen lista)	11
Germany (GfK)	28
Hungary (Mahasz)	10
Iceland (Íslenski Listinn Topp 40)	25
Netherlands (Dutch Top 40 Tipparade)	6
Netherlands (Single Top 100)	55
New Zealand (Recorded Music NZ)	40
Poland Airplay (Music & Media)	4
Scotland (OCC)	11
Sweden (Sverigetopplistan)	33
Switzerland (Schweizer Hitparade)	21
UK Singles (OCC)	8
US Billboard Hot 100	10
US Adult Top 40 (Billboard)	33
US Adult Contemporary (Billboard)	22
US Dance Club Play (Billboard)	10
US Mainstream Top 40 (Billboard)	20
US Maxi-Singles Sales (Billboard)	6
US Rhythmic Top 40 (Billboard)	29

==== Year-end charts ====
Chart (1998)	Position
Canada Top Singles (RPM)	40
Canada Adult Contemporary (RPM)	18
Canada Dance (RPM)	35
UK Singles (OCC)	173
US Billboard Hot 100	66
US Mainstream Top 40 (Billboard)	79
US Maxi-Singles Sales (Billboard)	17

=== Sales and certifications ===
Region	Certification	Certified units/sales
United States (RIAA)	Gold	500,000

=== Release history ===
Region	Date	Format(s)	Label(s)	Ref.
United States	16 June 1998	Rhythmic contemporary; contemporary hit radio	Arista	
Europe	10 August 1998	CD	Mega; Polydor; Barclay	
Canada	11 August 1998	CD	Arista	
United Kingdom	28 September 1998	CD; cassette	London	

== Ace of Base and Alliage version ==
"Cruel Summer"

Single by Ace of Base and Alliage

from the album Musics
- Released: 30 June 1998
- Studio: Rock-stone (London)
- Genre: Pop; house
- Length: 3:24
- Label: Baxter; Mercury; PolyGram
- Songwriters: Sara Dallin; Siobhan Fahey; Keren Woodward; Steve Jolley; Tony Swain; Daniel Moyne; Jean-Toussaint Tosi
- Producer: Steve Mac

Alliage singles chronology
"Je sais" (1998)	"Cruel Summer" (1998)	"Je I'aime à mourir" (1998)

Ace of Base singles chronology
"Life Is a Flower" (1998)	"Cruel Summer" (1998)	"Whenever You're Near Me" (1998)

Music video
- "Cruel Summer" (Ace of Base / Alliage version) on YouTube

Ace of Base united with the French boy band Alliage and re-recorded as a duet in a release designed specifically for the French markets. It is bilingual in English and French with added lyrics to the original. The joint version peaked at number 24 on SNEP, the official French Singles Chart.

Chart	Peak position
France (SNEP)	24

== Rico Bernasconi vs. Ace of Base version ==
Cruel Summer

EP by Rico Bernasconi vs Ace of Base
- Released: 2009
- Genres: House; progressive house; electronic dance

Music video
- "Cruel Summer" (Rico Bernasconi vs Ace of Base version) on YouTube

Rico Bernasconi released a remix EP with 8 remix versions of the Ace of Base version of "Cruel Summer" which peaked at No. 69 in Germany.

=== Track listing ===
1. "Cruel Summer" (Screen mix) (3:19)
2. "Cruel Summer" (Tom Pulse Sunshine radio mix) (3:00)
3. "Cruel Summer" (original club mix) (6:21)
4. "Cruel Summer" (Tom Pulse Sunshine club mix) (5:24)
5. "Cruel Summer" (Max Farenthide remix) (5:48)
6. "Cruel Summer" (DJ Tom Cut remix) (5:26)
7. "Cruel Summer" (DJ Tomekk vs. Anady club remix) (6:10)
8. "Cruel Summer" (Chris Galmon vs. Christopher GrEy club mix) (6:13)

== Other versions ==
- Kari Kimmel's version of the song was recorded for season 2 of Cobra Kai and was released on its soundtrack album. It was used for the season's teaser trailer as well as being played at the end of the season finale, echoing the original song's use in The Karate Kid to which the show is a sequel.
- Amy Lee and Troy McLawhorn of Evanescence recorded their version of the song at home during the COVID-19 pandemic for MagentaMusik 360.
- British artist Jessie Ware sampled the song for the track "Mirage (Don't Stop)" on her 4th studio album What's Your Pleasure?

2025 weekly chart performance for "Cruel Summer" Bob Sinclar version
Chart (2025)	Peak position
North Macedonia Airplay (Radiomonitor)	14
Romania Airplay (TopHit)	74
