= Movin' On (Bananarama song) =

1992 single by Bananarama

Single by Bananarama

from the album Please Yourself
- B-side: "Treat Me Right"
- Released: 17 August 1992
- Genre: Dance; hi-NRG
- Length: 4:36; 3:31 (7-inch mix)
- Label: London
- Songwriters: Sara Dallin; Keren Woodward; Mike Stock; Pete Waterman
- Producers: Mike Stock; Pete Waterman

Bananarama singles chronology
"Tripping on Your Love" (1991)	"Movin' On" (1992)	"Last Thing on My Mind" (1992)

Music video
- "Movin' On" on YouTube

"'Movin' On" is a song written and performed by the English girl group Bananarama. Released on 17 August 1992 by London Records, it was the first single from their sixth album, Please Yourself (1993). The song was produced by Mike Stock and Pete Waterman, two-thirds of the Stock Aitken Waterman (SAW) trio who had produced a number of Bananarama's past hits. Its accompanying music video was directed by Philippe Gautier.

"Movin' On" is an uptempo dance ballad. The single was met with mixed reviews and moderate success when released, peaking at number 24 on the UK Singles Chart. In Finland and Israel, the song became a top-10 hit. It was later covered by English band Steps on their second album, Steptacular. In 2012, the song was included on Bananarama's Now or Never EP in a new version.

== Critical reception ==
Quentin Harrison from Albumism wrote, "Now as a duo, their voices and songwriting perspectives were even more closely aligned and that translated to the music as heard on the uptempo ballad of 'Movin' On', a thematically timely tune capturing their post-Pop Life mindset." Larry Flick from Billboard magazine called it a "tasty dance confection", adding that "the group's trademark unison vocals are now more tightly focused and interesting to the ear. And yet, they appear more relaxed and playful". In 2017, Christian Guiltenane of British magazine Attitude stated that the song was "Waterman's first attempt at borrowing ABBA's majestic sound" and described it as a "flamboyant camp-them [which] is pure hiNRG joy and is as silly as it is enjoyable".

== Music video ==
The music video for "Movin' On" was directed by Philippe Gautier and begins with the girls performing from behind a wooden cut-out of the image that appears on the cover of the single. They emerge from behind it in red evening gowns and descend a staircase as scantily clad showboys with feathered fans perform around them. Several muscular men pose on podiums as live Grecian statues. As a nod to their trademark silliness, they can be seen tussling in the midst of their choreographed descent down the stairs. At the end, the duo exit down the long runway of a stage, and then reappear behind the wooden cut-outs, to the sound of applause.

== Track listings ==
- UK CD 1 single
1. "Movin' On" (7-inch mix) – 3:32
2. "Movin' On" (Bumpin' mix) – 6:15 (Remixed by CJ Mackintosh)
3. "Treat Me Right" – 4:41
4. "Movin' On" (Spag-A-Nana dub) – 6:17
- UK CD 2 single
1. "Movin' On" (Straight No Chaser)
2. "Movin' On" (Bumpin' mix) – 6:15 (remixed by CJ Mackintosh)
3. "Movin' On" (Spag-a-Nana dub) – 6:17
4. "Treat Me Right" – 4:41

== Charts ==
Chart (1992)	Peak position
Australia (ARIA)	177
Belgium (Ultratop 50 Flanders)	33
Europe (Eurochart Hot 100)	49
Europe (European AC Radio)	15
Europe (European Hit Radio)	18
Finland (IFPI)	6
Germany (GfK)	52
Israel (Israeli Singles Chart)	10
Netherlands (Dutch Top 40)	32
Netherlands (Single Top 100)	34
UK Singles (Official Charts)	24
UK Airplay (Music Week)	23
UK Dance (Music Week)	36

== Release history ==
Region	Date	Format(s)	Label(s)	Ref.
United Kingdom	17 August 1992	7-inch vinyl; 12-inch vinyl; CD; cassette	London	
Australia	28 September 1992	CD; cassette	London	
Japan	10 October 1992	Mini-CD	London	

== Cover versions ==
- The track was covered by Japanese pop duo Wink, on their 1993 album, Brunch.
- The song was later covered by British band Steps on their 1999 album, Steptacular a year after their cover "Last Thing on My Mind" was a hit.
