= Rough Justice (Bananarama song) =

Single by Bananarama

from the album Bananarama
- B-side: "Live Now"
- Released: 14 May 1984
- Recorded: September 1983
- Genre: Pop; new wave
- Length: 5:05 (album version); 3:38 (7" version)
- Label: London
- Songwriters: Sara Dallin; Siobhan Fahey; Keren Woodward; Jolley & Swain
- Producers: Jolley & Swain

Bananarama singles chronology
"Robert De Niro's Waiting..." (1984)	"Rough Justice" (1984)	"King of the Jungle" (1984)

"Rough Justice" is a song by the English girl group Bananarama. It was co-written by group members Sara Dallin, Siobhan Fahey, and Keren Woodward and the writing-production duo Jolley & Swain who also produced the song. The song was released in May 1984 as the third single from their self-titled second album.

== Song topic and reception ==
The song is one of several composed by Bananarama at the time which lyrically addressed "serious" topics. The song was written about Thomas "Kidso" Reilly, the band's road manager and brother of Fahey's boyfriend Jim Reilly (drummer of the Northern Irish punk band Stiff Little Fingers), who was shot and killed by a British soldier in Belfast in August 1983. Although the music was upbeat, the heavy lyrical content did not prove to be as successful as their prior single ("Robert De Niro's Waiting..."). It peaked at number 23 on the UK Singles Chart. In Australia, the song failed to chart and it was not released as a single in the United States.

"Rough Justice" was remixed slightly from its album version when released as a single, most notably in the track's introduction.

== Music video ==
The music video features the girls preparing for an appearance on a show at a TV studio. The video begins with a young boy dressed in a tuxedo entering the girls' dressing room to give them congratulatory flowers only to take pictures of them without asking, which causes Keren Woodward to eject him from the room. As soon as the boy is gone, the girls see a TV news report which is actually being made in the studio next door (the report was presented by BBC newscaster Peter Woods, who made a cameo in the clip). The studio floor manager, played by the band's then-choreographer Bruno Tonioli, comes to take the girls to the studio where they will be filming their appearance but as he is looking away, the girls head into the other studio. They end up hijacking the news broadcast in order to get their message out to the public.

== Track listing ==
UK & NL 7" vinyl single (UK: London Records NANA 7 / NL: London Records 820 081-7)

1. "Rough Justice" (single version) – 3:38
2. "Live Now" – 3:31

+ some copies of the 7" came with free poster

+ some copies of the 7" came with a 3D sleeve NAND 7

12" vinyl single (London Records NANX 7)

1. "Rough Justice" (12" version) – 5:13
2. "Rough Justice" (album version) – 5:05
3. "Live Now" – 3:31

+ some copies of the 12" came with three 3D cards NAND X7

== Charts ==
Chart performance for "Rough Justice"
Chart (1984)	Peak position
Belgium (Ultratop 50 Flanders)	19
Ireland (IRMA)	24
Netherlands (Single Top 100)	16
UK Singles Chart	23
West Germany (GfK)	63
