= Bananarama =

English girl group

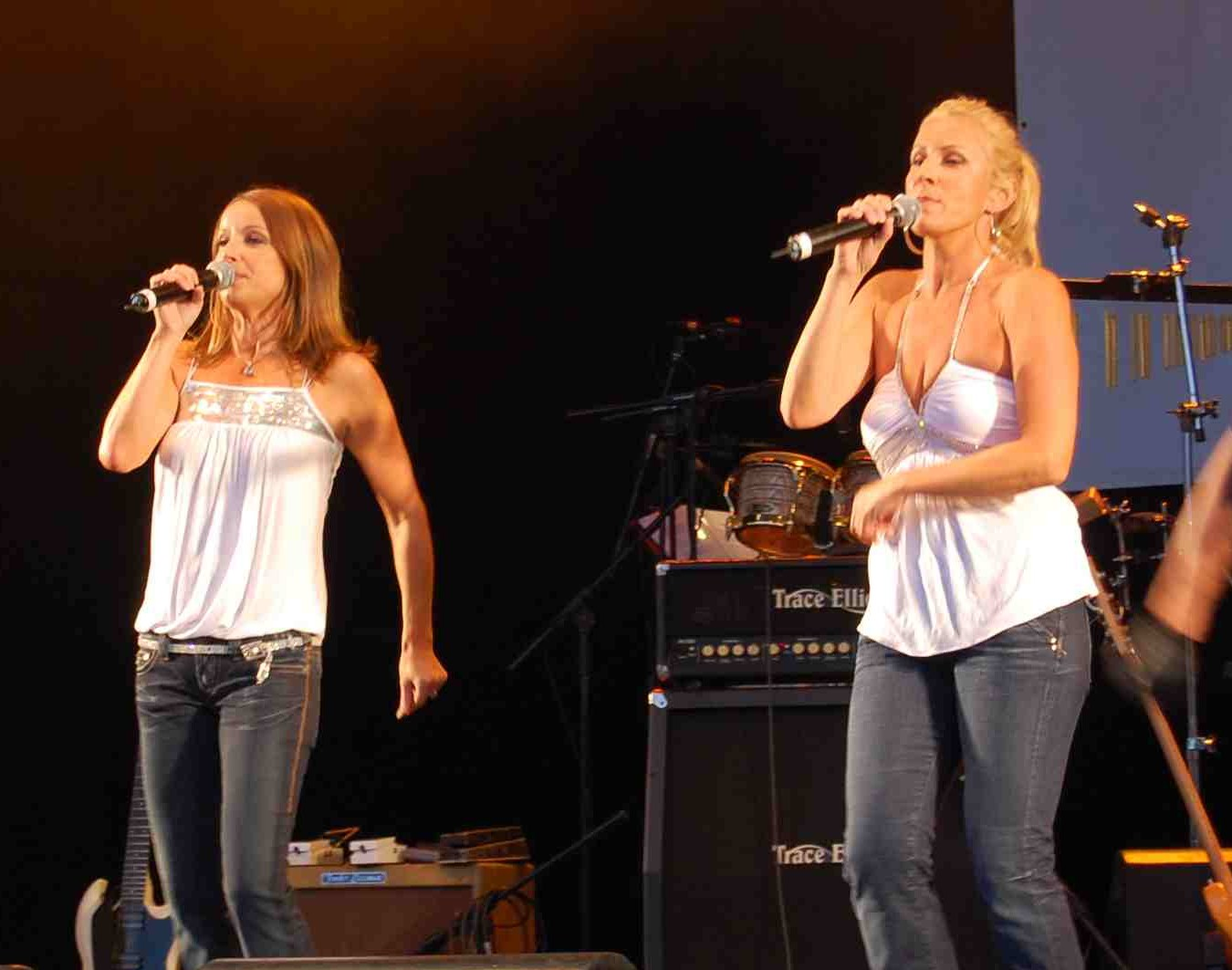
- Bananarama in 2006

Background information
- Origin: London, England
- Genres: Pop; dance-pop; hi-NRG; new wave; Eurodance
- Years active: 1980–present
- Labels: Deram; London; A&G; Fascination; Rhino; Live Here Now
- Members: Sara Dallin; Keren Woodward
- Past members: Siobhan Fahey; Jacquie O'Sullivan
- Website: bananarama.co.uk

Bananarama are an English pop group formed in London in 1980. The group, originally a trio, consisted of friends Sara Dallin, Siobhan Fahey, and Keren Woodward. In early 1988, Jacquie O'Sullivan replaced Fahey, who went on to form Shakespears Sister. O'Sullivan left the group in 1991, since which time Dallin and Woodward have continued as a duo, with the brief exception of a one-off reunion tour with Fahey during 2017. Their success on both pop and dance charts saw them listed in the Guinness World Records for achieving the world's highest number of chart entries by an all-female group. Between 1982 and 2009, they had 32 singles reach the Top 50 of the UK Singles Chart.

First coming to prominence as vocalists on Fun Boy Three's UK Top 5 hit "It Ain't What You Do (It's the Way That You Do It)" in 1982, the original line-up with Fahey scored several UK hits, including "Really Saying Something", "Shy Boy" (both 1982), "Na Na Hey Hey Kiss Him Goodbye", "Cruel Summer" (both 1983, with the latter becoming a hit again as the remixed "Cruel Summer '89" in 1989), "Robert De Niro's Waiting...", "Rough Justice" (both 1984), "Venus" (1986), which reached No. 1 in the US, "I Heard a Rumour", "Love in the First Degree", and "I Can't Help It" (all 1987), while the line-up with O'Sullivan achieved further UK hits with "I Want You Back", "Love, Truth and Honesty", "Nathan Jones" (all 1988), "Help!" (1989), recorded with Lananeeneenoonoo (comedy duo French and Saunders and comedian Kathy Burke) for the Comic Relief charity, "Only Your Love", "Preacher Man" (both 1990), and "Long Train Runnin'" (1991). Since becoming a duo, the group has had four more UK Top 30 hits with "Movin' On" (1992), "More, More, More" (1993), "Move in My Direction", and "Look on the Floor (Hypnotic Tango)" (both 2005). The original trio also performed on the UK chart-topping Band Aid charity single "Do They Know It's Christmas?" in 1984, while the second trio with O'Sullivan performed on the 1989 Band Aid II version of the song, which also reached UK No. 1. In the US, where they are considered part of the MTV-driven Second British Invasion, they had eleven singles reach Billboard Hot 100 during 1983–1988. They topped the Australian ARIA albums chart in June 1988 with their fourth album Wow! (1987), and earned Brit Award nominations for Best British Single for "Love in the First Degree" and Best Music Video for "Nathan Jones".

== Career ==
=== 1980–1982: early years ===
Bananarama formed in September 1980 when teenagers and childhood friends Sara Dallin and Keren Woodward moved from Bristol to London and met Siobhan Fahey. Dallin and Fahey were studying journalism at the London College of Fashion (University of Arts) and Woodward was working at the BBC in Portland Place. Dallin and Woodward were living at the YWCA and were nearly homeless until Paul Cook, with whom they had become friends after meeting at a club, offered them a place to live above the former Sex Pistols rehearsal room in Denmark Street, Charing Cross. They took their name, in part, from the Roxy Music song "Pyjamarama".

The trio were ardent followers of the punk rock and post-punk music scenes during the late 1970s and early 1980s. They often performed impromptu sets or backing vocals at gigs for such bands as the Monochrome Set, the Professionals, Subway Sect, Iggy Pop, Department S, the Nipple Erectors, and the Jam. In 1981, Bananarama recorded their first demo, "Aie a Mwana", a cover of a song by Black Blood, sung in Swahili. The demo was heard at Demon Records, who consequently offered Bananarama their first deal. The song was an underground hit (UK No. 92) and Bananarama were signed by Decca (later London Records) and remained on the label until 1993. UK music magazine The Face featured an article on Bananarama after the release of their first single. This caught the attention of ex-Specials member Terry Hall, who invited them to collaborate with his new vocal group Fun Boy Three on their album and the single "It Ain't What You Do (It's The Way That You Do It)". In 1982, the song hit the Top 5 in the UK and gave Bananarama their first significant mainstream success. Fun Boy Three then guested on Bananarama's single, "Really Saying Something", later that year.

=== 1982–1985: Deep Sea Skiving and Bananarama ===
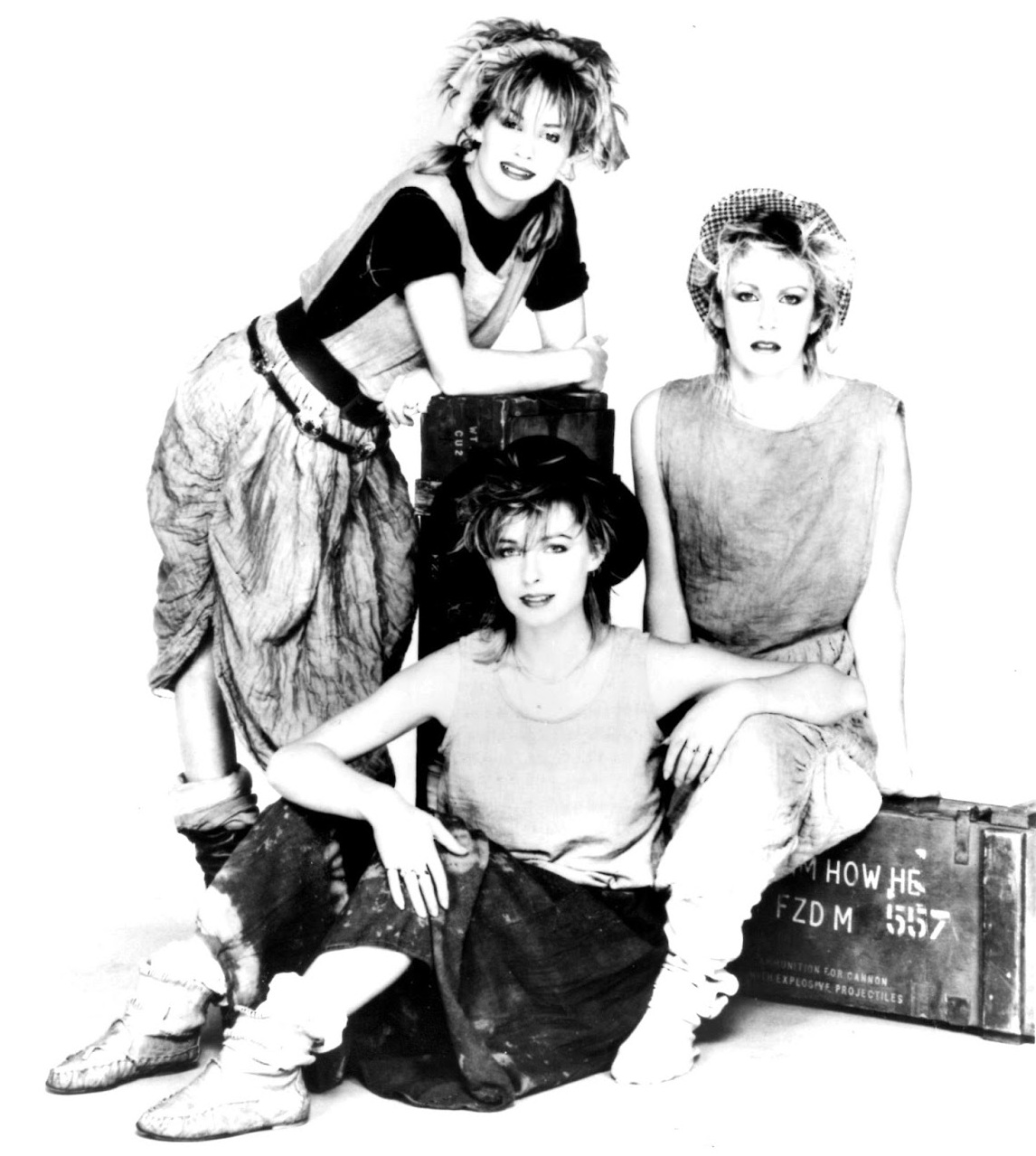
Bananarama in 1983 (from left to right: Siobhan Fahey, Keren Woodward, and Sara Dallin)

Bananarama experienced their greatest success during the period 1982 to 1989, with their first three albums primarily produced and co-written with Jolley & Swain. Their debut album, Deep Sea Skiving (UK No. 7, US No. 63) (1983) contained several hit singles – "Really Saying Something" (UK No. 5) and "Shy Boy" (UK No. 4) – and included a cover version of "Na Na Hey Hey (Kiss Him Goodbye)" (UK No. 5). "Cheers Then" (UK No. 45) was released as the third single, with little chart success, but very positive reviews from critics. The album peaked at No. 7 on the UK Albums Chart and was certified Silver by the British Phonographic Industry (BPI).

The band recorded a version of the Sex Pistols' song "No Feelings" in late 1982 for the soundtrack of the British teen-comedy film, Party Party. During 1982 and 1983, Bananarama did several promotional US press tours and TV appearances the first being on The Uncle Floyd Show and on American Bandstand and Solid Gold. The group had their first major success in the United States in 1984 with the Top 10 hit "Cruel Summer" (UK No. 8, US No. 9), bolstered by the song's inclusion in the soundtrack to the 1984 film The Karate Kid. The song was ranked No. 44 on VH1's 100 Greatest Songs of the '80s. Billboard named the song No. 13 on their list of the "100 Greatest Girl Group Songs of All Time".

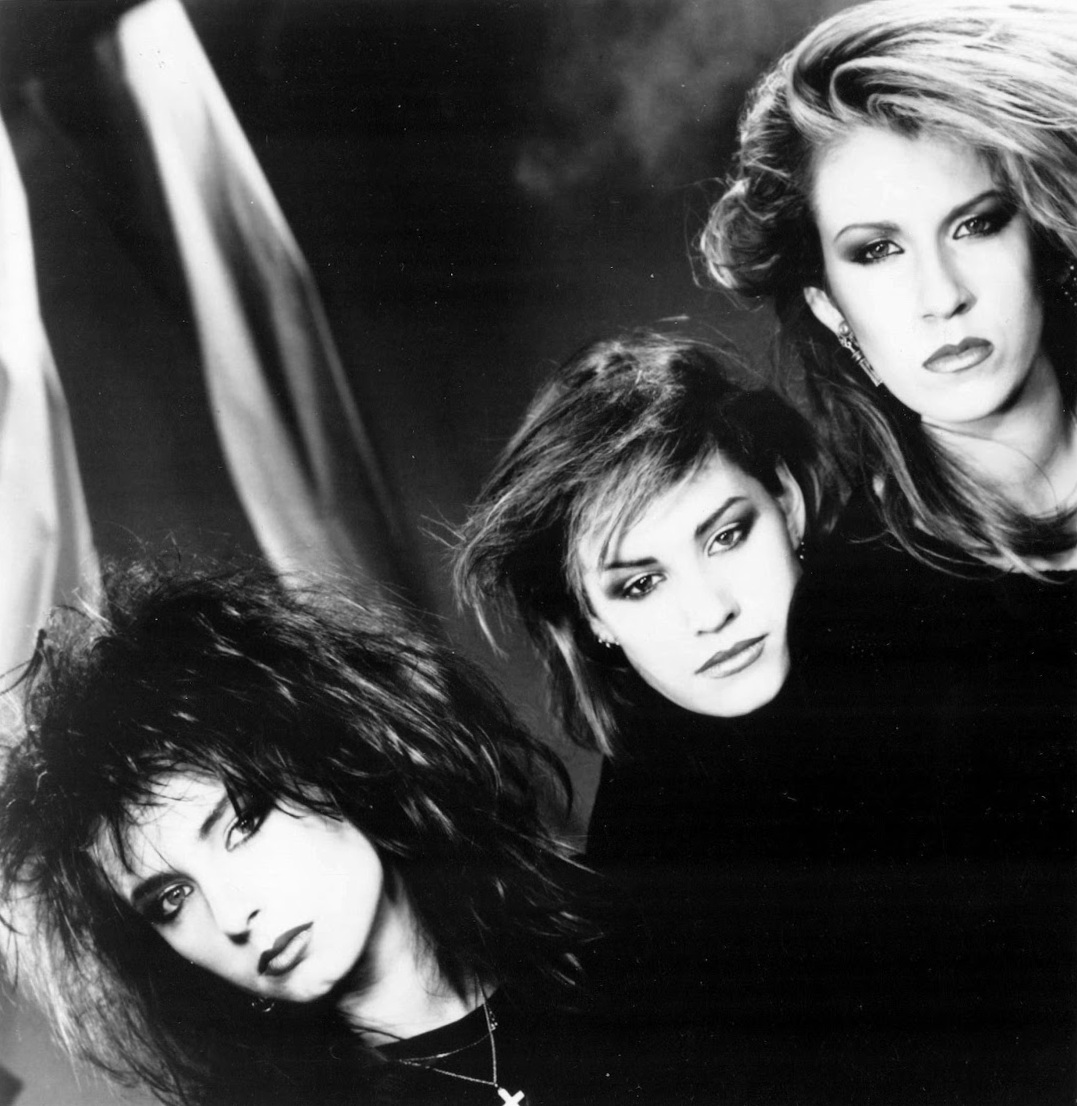
Bananarama in 1984

Their second album, Bananarama (UK No. 16, US No. 30) was released in 1984. Single "Rough Justice" (UK No. 23) was written about Thomas Reilly, the band's road manager and brother of Fahey's boyfriend Jim Reilly (drummer of the Northern Irish punk band Stiff Little Fingers), who was shot and killed by a British soldier in Belfast in August 1983. The album contained the hit singles, "Robert De Niro's Waiting..." (UK No. 3) and "Rough Justice" (UK No. 23). The track "Hot Line to Heaven" was also released as a single in the UK but failed to reach the Top 40, peaking at No. 58. The album peaked at No. 16 on the UK Albums Chart, reached the US Top 40 albums chart, and was certified Silver by the BPI. The trio also recorded the single, "The Wild Life" (US No. 70) for the 1984 American film of the same name. In 1984, Bananarama featured on the Band Aid single, "Do They Know It's Christmas?" and were the only artists to appear on both the original 1984 Band Aid and the 1989 Band Aid II versions (Fahey appeared on the 1984 version while O'Sullivan appeared on the 1989 version). The stand-alone single "Do Not Disturb" (UK No. 31) was released in 1985, although it was later added to their third album True Confessions.

=== 1986–1987: True Confessions and international success ===
In 1986, the band released their third album, True Confessions. The majority of the album was produced by Jolley & Swain with the exception of "Venus" and "More Than Physical". The album contains the group's most commercially successful single to date, a cover version of Shocking Blue's 1969 song "Venus", which peaked at No. 1 on the Billboard Hot 100 in the United States. The music video for "Venus" received heavy airplay on MTV in the United States. In 2014, Matt Dunn of WhatCulture ranked the song at No. 5 in his "15 unforgettable Stock Aitken Waterman singles" list, describing it as a "timeless classic of 80s synth pop, an instantly recognisable foot-tapping gem", while underlining the "provocative video and all its fire, sexy choreography, coffin dancing and red patent-leather devil outfits". In 2021, British magazine Classic Pop ranked "Venus" No. 2 in their list of "Top 40 Stock Aitken Waterman songs".

"Venus" – Bananarama
An excerpt from Bananarama's 1986 version of "Venus"

True Confessions reached No. 46 on the UK Albums Chart and No. 15 on the US Billboard 200, becoming the group's highest-charting album on the latter chart. Tom Hibbert of Smash Hits praised the album as being "undeniably, convincingly listenable" and "a proper pop 'album'", adding that Bananarama "make 'intriguing' pop – and can even sustain the charm across an entire LP." Also in 1986, Dallin and Woodward were featured as backing vocalists on two songs on Family Album, produced by John Lydon. Follow-up single "More Than Physical" hit UK No. 41, and "A Trick of the Night" hit No. 32.

During a press tour in New York City, the group also recorded a song "Riskin' a Romance" featured in the film The Secret of My Success (1987). In March 1987, Bananarama participated in the recording of the single "Let It Be" (UK No. 1) as members of the charity supergroup Ferry Aid. All sales from the single were donated to charity in response to the capsizing of the ferry MS Herald of Free Enterprise, which killed 193 people. Among the featured singers was Woodward, who sang with Nick Kamen.

=== 1987–1988: Wow! and Fahey's departure ===
In the wake of the success of "Venus", Bananarama began work on the album Wow! The album reached No. 26 on the UK Albums Chart and No. 44 on the US Billboard 200, while peaking at No. 1 in Australia. The album was certified Gold by the British Phonographic Industry (BPI) in 1988.

"I Heard a Rumour" (UK No. 14, US No. 4) was their strongest performing international hit from the album. "Love in the First Degree" (UK No. 3), one of their biggest UK hits, was nominated at the 1988 Brit Awards for best single. A further single, "I Can't Help It" was also a hit (UK No. 20). After the third single from Wow! was released in early 1988, Fahey – who had married Eurythmics' Dave Stewart – left the group. Her last performance as a member of the group was "Love in the First Degree" at the Brit Awards in February 1988. She would later resurface in the BRIT Award–winning pop duo Shakespears Sister with Marcella Detroit.

=== 1988–1991: second line-up, Greatest Hits, Pop Life and world tour ===
After Fahey's exit, Jacquie O'Sullivan (formerly of the Shillelagh Sisters) joined the group in March 1988. The single "I Want You Back" (UK No. 5) was re-recorded with O'Sullivan, as was the Supremes cover "Nathan Jones" (UK No. 15) which was nominated for best video at the 1989 Brit Awards. "Love, Truth and Honesty" (UK No. 23) was released as a single from their 1988 retrospective compilation, Greatest Hits Collection (UK No. 3). At the same time, Bananarama entered the Guinness Book of World Records as the all-female group who have the most UK chart entries in history, a record they still hold.

As a fundraising charity single for Comic Relief in 1989, Bananarama recorded a cover of the Beatles' song "Help!" with Lananeeneenoonoo (UK No. 3), a mock girl-group created by British female comedy duo French and Saunders, with fellow comedian Kathy Burke. Also in 1989, the band embarked upon their first world tour, which included shows in North America, East Asia, and the UK. Bananarama's 1991 album, Pop Life, saw Dallin's and Woodward's songwriting collaboration with their friend Youth. They worked with a variety of producers including Youth, Shep Pettibone, and Steve Jolley of Jolley & Swain. They also incorporated a wider range of musical genres including reggae, flamenco guitar, and acid house. Singles "Only Your Love" (UK No. 27), "Preacher Man" (UK No. 20), a cover of the Doobie Brothers' "Long Train Running" (UK No. 30), and "Tripping on Your Love" (UK No. 76) were the group's final releases with O'Sullivan. In a rave review for Entertainment Weekly, Chuck Eddy said that Pop Life, "while energetic, is far moodier than anything they've ever done. The Gipsy Kings ... help engineer the Doobie Brothers' 'Long Train Running' into a scary locomotive blues. Other tracks venture deep into the dark tunnel of dreamland: Pulses from an alternate universe underline fizzy computerized harmonies; sleepy voices trying hard to wake up ask 'What color are the skies where you live?' ... Two other songs even have heavy psychedelic guitars. We usually visit Bananaramaland to escape our problems, but this album takes us to an eerier place than we'd ever expect."

=== 1992–2001: Duo re-launch, Please Yourself, Ultra Violet and Exotica ===
In 1992, Dallin and Woodward returned as a duo and had a UK Top 30 hit with "Movin' On" (UK No. 24), which was the first single from the 1993 album Please Yourself. Other singles from the album were "Last Thing on My Mind" (UK No. 71) and a cover of the 1976 Andrea True Connection song "More, More, More" (UK No. 24). In July 2018, Mark Elliot of Classic Pop ranked Please Yourself as the 14th best album ever produced by Stock Aitken Waterman. He presented the album as "a concept project [Waterman] billed "ABBA-Banana", and considered "Movin'On" and "Last Thing on My Mind" as "classics".

Their next offering was 1995's Ultra Violet (entitled I Found Love in Japan) on a new label. The album and its three singles — "I Found Love", "Every Shade of Blue", and "Take Me to Your Heart" — were only released in some European countries, North America, Japan, and Australia, but not in Britain. In 1998, Dallin and Woodward asked Fahey to join them to record the track "Waterloo" (a cover of the ABBA song) for the Eurovision celebration A Song for Eurotrash on Channel 4. In 1999, Dallin, Woodward, and Fahey were interviewed together for an episode of the BBC music documentary series Young Guns Go For It dedicated to the group. In 2001, Dallin and Woodward, who had been frequently working in France, had recorded the album Exotica with the French label M6. The album also included a cover of George Michael's "Careless Whisper", Latin- and R&B-influenced dance songs, and reinterpreted versions of their earlier hits.

=== 2002–2006: Very Best and Drama ===
In 2002, the group released The Very Best of Bananarama to celebrate the group's 20th anniversary, including their singles released from 1981 to 1993. In February, Dallin and Woodward performed a 20th-anniversary concert at G-A-Y in London. Fahey joined them at the encore to sing "Venus" for- as Graham Norton, who introduced them, put it- a "last time ever" reunion. Bananarama also recorded the song "Love Him, Leave Him, Forget Him" for Sky TV's show Is Harry on the Boat? as well as the song "U R My Baby" for a German disco project. The album reached No. 43 on the UK Albums Chart. In 2005, Dallin and Woodward collaborated with Murlyn Music Group, writing and recording in Sweden for six months to produce the album Drama. The album's first single "Move in My Direction" debuted on the UK Singles Chart at No. 14, also becoming their first UK Top 40 entry since 1993. The second single, "Look on the Floor (Hypnotic Tango)", also reached the UK Top 40, and climbed to No. 2 on the US Hot Dance Club Play chart as an import, becoming Bananarama's biggest US dancefloor hit since "Venus" two decades earlier. Drama charted at No. 21 on Billboard's Top Electronic Albums chart.

=== 2006–2011: Remasters and Viva ===
In 2006, Warner Bros. Records released The Twelve Inches of Bananarama, a compilation of twelve remixes on CD including the rare George Michael remix of "Tripping on Your Love". On 19 March 2007, Bananarama's first six studio albums were reissued by Rhino Records on CD with bonus material, including alternative versions, remixes, and B-sides. On 7 May 2007, another best-of collection titled Greatest Hits and More More More was released by Warner Bros. Records.

In August 2008, Bananarama were back in the studio recording a track with Rev Run from Run-D.M.C. The song, 'Invincible', credited as Rev Run featuring Bananarama, did not surface until late 2014 on Rev Run's solo album Red Rhythm Rewind. In June 2009, Bananarama performed at the Isle of Wight Festival. In August 2009, they performed at the 80s Rewind Festival in Henley-on-Thames alongside other 1980s acts which included Rick Astley, Belinda Carlisle, and Kim Wilde.

Bananarama released a new single entitled "Love Comes" (UK No. 44) and a new album Viva (UK No. 87) in September 2009. The album was produced by Ian Masterson and released through Fascination Records. A second single was released from the album in April 2010, a new remix of the song "Love Don't Live Here" (UK No. 114) backed by Ian Masterson's 2010 reworking of the 1995 single "Every Shade of Blue" and "The Runner" (originally recorded by The Three Degrees), remixed by Buzz Junkies. In April 2011, Bananarama appeared on ITV's hit comedy Benidorm and performed "Love in the First Degree", "Robert De Niro's Waiting...", and "Movin' On".

=== 2012–2016: 30 Years of Bananarama ===
On 9 July 2012, Warner Music imprint Rhino Records released a greatest hits CD and DVD Collection 30 Years of Bananarama to celebrate the band's 30th anniversary. The CD features Bananarama's 22 best-known singles, from their 1981 debut, "Aie a Mwana", to their 2009 effort, "Love Don't Live Here". All songs are presented in chronological order (except the bonus tracks on digital) with most of them being their album versions. The digital version includes three extra tracks "Rough Justice", "Long Train Running", and "A Trick of the Night", adding up to a total of 25 tracks. The album charted at No. 62 on the UK Albums Chart. On 9 August 2012, the band performed at the men's final of the beach volleyball at the London Olympics. They performed a medley of "Cruel Summer", "Love in the First Degree", and "Venus". In December 2016, Billboard magazine ranked them the 94th most successful dance artist of all time.

=== 2017–present: original line-up tour, In Stereo, Really Saying Something and Masquerade ===
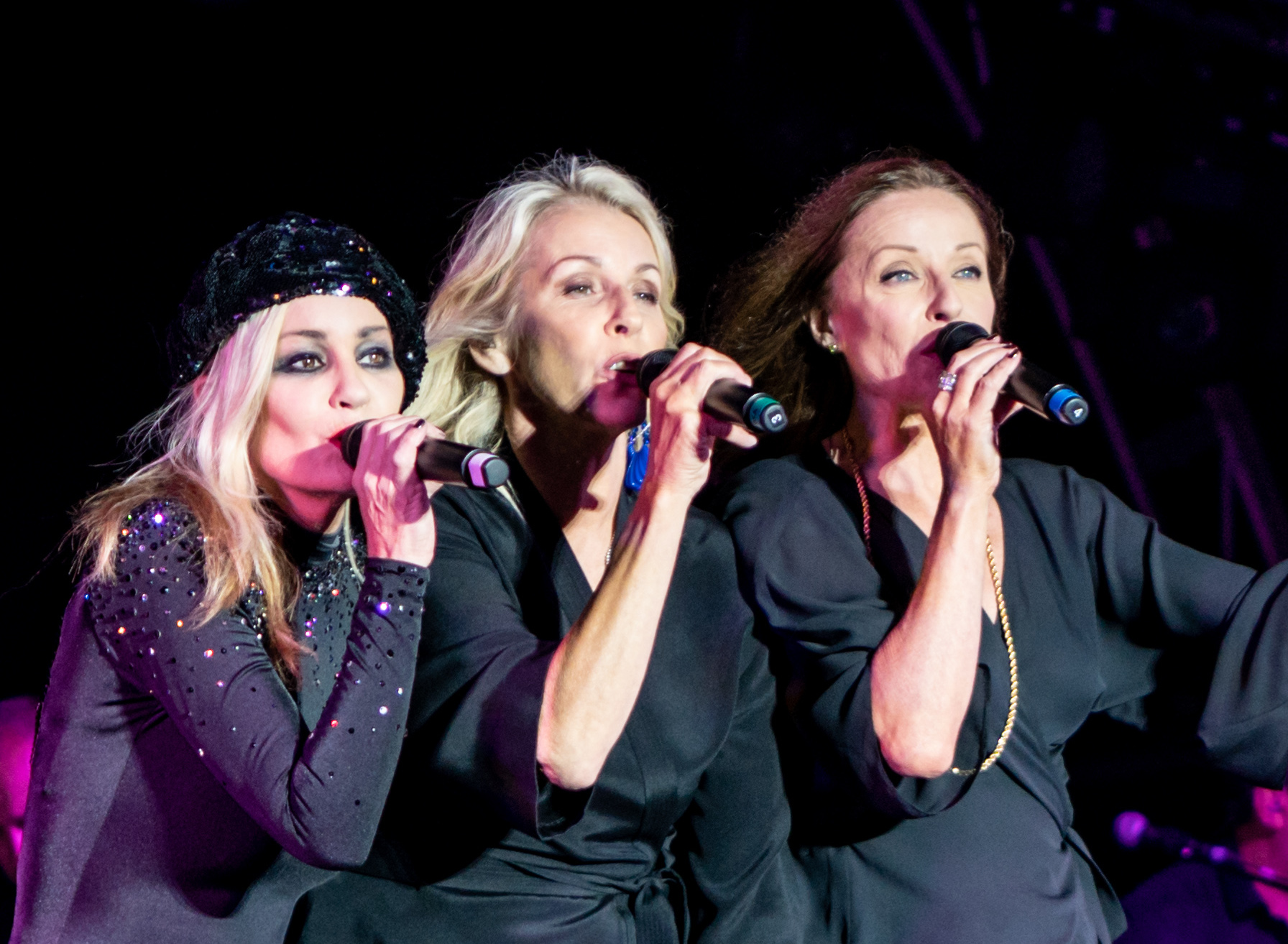
Bananarama in 2018

On 23 April 2017, Fahey rejoined Bananarama. The Original Line-up Tour saw them perform 23 sell-out dates across the UK in November and December 2017. In February 2018, they played four dates in North America: Los Angeles, San Francisco, and New York City in the United States; and Toronto in Canada. Their final dates as a trio were in August 2018. On 22 December 2018, Dallin and Woodward again appeared as contestants on the Christmas Special of the game show Pointless Celebrities.

On 19 April 2019, Dallin and Woodward released their new album In Stereo (UK No. 29). On 29 April 2022, Dallin and Woodward released the track "Favourite" from their twelfth studio album Masquerade, which was released on 22 July 2022. On 15 June 2022, the album title track "Masquerade" was released as the first official single, and its music video followed two days later. A second track entitled "Velvet Lies" followed on 18 July 2022. On 12 August 2022, "Forever Young" was released as the official second single. On 14 October 2022, "Running with the Night" was released as the official third single. The album's release was followed by two launch shows at London Lafayette on 3 and 4 August 2022. On March 8, 2024 the duo released Glorious: The Ultimate Collection in various formats.

== Musical style and influences ==
Bananarama plays a style of pop music influenced by ska. They began their career playing a style that combined elements of post-punk and new wave music with girl group music.

== Awards and nominations ==
Award	Year	Category	Nominee(s)	Result	Ref.
Billboard Music Awards	1986	Top Hot 100 Artist	Themselves	Nominated	
Billboard Music Awards	1986	Top Dance Club Play Artist	Themselves	Nominated	
Billboard Music Awards	1986	Top Dance Sales Artist	Themselves	Nominated	
Billboard Music Awards	1986	Top Hot 100 Song	"Venus"	Nominated	
Billboard Music Awards	1986	Top Dance Club Play Single	"Venus"	Nominated	
Billboard Music Awards	1986	Top Dance Sales Single	"Venus"	Nominated	
Billboard Music Awards	1987	Top Hot 100 Artist	Themselves	Nominated	
Billboard Music Awards	1987	Top Dance Club Play Artist	Themselves	Nominated	
Billboard Music Awards	1987	Top Hot 100 Song	"I Heard a Rumour"	Nominated	
Billboard Music Awards	1987	Top Dance Club Play Single	"I Heard a Rumour"	Nominated	
Brit Awards	1988	British Single of the Year	"Love in the First Degree"	Nominated	
Brit Awards	1989	British Video of the Year	"Nathan Jones"	Nominated	
Classic Pop Readers' Awards	2018	Group of the Year	Themselves	Won	
Classic Pop Readers' Awards	2020	Album of the Year	In Stereo	Won	
International Dance Music Awards	2007	Best HiNRG/Euro Dance Track	"Look on the Floor"	Nominated	
International Dance Music Awards	2007	Best Dance Music Video	"Look on the Floor"	Nominated	
Music Week Awards	2025	Catalogue Marketing Campaign	Themselves	Nominated	
Smash Hits Poll Winners Party	1989	Best Group	Themselves	Nominated	

== Members ==
=== Current ===
- Sara Dallin (1980–present)
- Keren Woodward (1980–present)

=== Former ===
- Siobhan Fahey (1980–1988, 1998, 2002, 2017–2018)
- Jacquie O'Sullivan (1988–1991)

== Discography ==
=== Studio albums ===
- Deep Sea Skiving (1983)
- Bananarama (1984)
- True Confessions (1986)
- Wow! (1987)
- Pop Life (1991)
- Please Yourself (1993)
- Ultra Violet (1995)
- Exotica (2001)
- Drama (2005)
- Viva (2009)
- In Stereo (2019)
- Masquerade (2022)

== Concert tours ==
Headlining

- Cruel Summer Tour (1985)
- Lovekids Tour (1988)
- Bananarama World Tour (1989)
- Dance Mix Tour (1995–1996)
- Bananarama Culture Tour (1997–1999)
- Drama World Tour (2005–2006)
- Viva Tour (2009–2010)
- Live in Concert (2012–2016)
- The Original Line Up Tour (2017–2018)
- In Stereo Tour (2019)
- Masquerade Tour (2022–2024)
- Too Hot To Handle Summer Tour (2027)

Co-headlining

- Here and Now Tour (with various artists) (2007–2008)

== List of all record labels ==
- London Records (UK, US and Canada, 1981–1993)
- ZYX Records (Germany, 1994–1996)
- avex trax (Japan, 1995 / Taiwan, 2006)
- Quality Records (Canada, 1995)
- Mega Records (Denmark, 1995)
- DigIt International (Italy, 1995)
- Festival Records (Australia, 1995)
- Popular Records (Canada 1996)
- Curb Records (USA, 1996)
- M6 Interactions (France, 2000)
- A&G Productions (UK, 2004–2006)
- The Lab (USA, 2006)
- True North Records (Canada, 2006)
- Edel Company (Germany, 2006)
- EQ Music (Singapore and Malaysia, 2005)
- Phantom Imports (Hong Kong, 2006)
- Central Station (Australia, 2005)
- Pony Canyon (Japan, 2006)
- Universal Records (Philippines, 2005)
- Blanco y Negro Records (Spain, 1995–2006)
- Megaliner Records (Russia, 2005)
- Nice Records (France, 2007)
- Fascination Records (UK, 2009–2010)
- BMG (UK, 2016–2019)
- Absolute Label Services (UK, 2019–present)

== See also ==
- Girl group
- List of best-selling girl groups
