= Robert De Niro's Waiting... =

1984 single by Bananarama

Single by Bananarama

from the album Bananarama
- B-side: "Push!"
- Released: 20 February 1984
- Genre: Synth-pop; new wave
- Length: 3:43
- Label: London
- Songwriters: Sara Dallin; Siobhan Fahey; Keren Woodward; Steve Jolley; Tony Swain
- Producer: Jolley & Swain

Bananarama singles chronology
"Cruel Summer" (1983)	"Robert De Niro's Waiting..." (1984)	"Rough Justice" (1984)

Music video
- "Robert De Niro's Waiting" on YouTube

"Robert De Niro's Waiting..." is a song written by Sara Dallin, Siobhan Fahey, Keren Woodward, Steve Jolley, and Tony Swain, recorded for the English girl group Bananarama's eponymous second studio album (1984). Produced by Jolley & Swain, it was released as the album's second single on 20 February 1984 by London Records. It namechecks American actor Robert De Niro. The single is one of the group's strongest-performing releases, peaking at number three on the UK Singles Chart. It made a brief appearance on the US Billboard Hot 100, peaking at number 95. Billboard ranked the song at number 74 on their list of the "100 Greatest Girl Group Songs of All Time".

An extended version of the song is available on the 12-inch single. The B-side of both 7-inch and 12-inch singles is a song called "Push!". The version of "Push!" on the 12-inch single is not extended but preceded by an unlisted alternate version of the brief track that would be called "Link" at the end of side one of the Bananarama album. Bananarama have re-recorded "Robert De Niro's Waiting..." twice, in 2000 for the G-A-Y compilation and the next year another new re-recording was included on their eighth studio album Exotica (2001).

== Lyrical content ==
In Bananarama's 2017 reunion interview with The Guardian, original group member Siobhan Fahey explained the song's meaning: "The thing I'm proudest of [...] is that we made quirky pop. The lyrics were much darker than you'd imagine. 'Robert De Niro's Waiting' is about date rape." Keren Woodward added, "You'll listen to it with new ears now." Sara Dallin continued, "I wanted it to be like 'Pull Up to the Bumper'. It didn't quite work out like that, did it?" This echoed similar statements in the group's contemporaneous, and earlier, interviews. However, in a 2019 interview with The Telegraph, Dallin offered a different explanation of the song's meaning: "It was just about hero worship. It wasn't about rape. I don't know where that came from. It's absolute rubbish."

== Music video ==
The music video for "Robert De Niro's Waiting..." was directed by Duncan Gibbins and shows Bananarama walking around dark streets, possibly followed by mafia-style clothed men. When it gets to the bridge part of the song, Dallin is shown running along, looking behind her as if being followed. As the video winds down, Dallin, Fahey, and Keren Woodward are back in their apartment, when the door bell rings. Woodward answers the door, only to be confronted by the man who might have been chasing them, armed with a Mafia-style violin case. As she looks nervously at him, the case falls open to reveal a sign saying "Pizza Delivery", along with three pizzas. Both the man and Woodward start laughing, and the video ends with Bananarama in their apartment eating the pizza and laughing.

According to Fahey, they could not find a Robert De Niro lookalike, so they chose a John Travolta lookalike.

== Track listings ==
Some copies of the UK 7-inch came with a cut out postcard of Fahey, Woodward, or Dallin. There were also three separate picture disc releases each with a photo of Fahey, Woodward, or Dallin. The UK 12-inch was available in three different vinyl colours: pink for Woodward, green for Fahey, and blue for Dallin, each with a large picture label.

7-inch single

A. "Robert De Niro's Waiting..." – 3:27
B. "Push!" – 4:08

12-inch single

A1. "Robert De Niro's Waiting..." (extended version) – 5:43
B1. Untitled ("Link") (unlisted on label and artwork) – 1:59
B2. "Push!" – 4:08

== Charts ==
=== Weekly charts ===
Chart (1984)	Peak position
Australia (Kent Music Report)	40
Europe (European Hot 100 Singles)	12
Ireland (IRMA)	8
Israel (Israeli Singles Chart)	8
Luxembourg (Radio Luxembourg)	3
Netherlands (Dutch Top 40)	25
Netherlands (Single Top 100)	22
South Africa (Springbok Radio)	7
Switzerland (Schweizer Hitparade)	8
UK Singles (Official Charts)	3
US Billboard Hot 100	95
West Germany (GfK)	7

=== Year-end charts ===
Chart (1984)	Position
UK Singles (Gallup)	69
