= Good Times (Shocking Blue album) =

Studio album by Shocking Blue
- Released: 30 October 1974
- Recorded: 8 November – 22 December 1973, 21 February – 7 March 1974
- Studio: Sound Push Studios, Blaricum, Netherlands
- Genre: Rock, blues rock, psychedelic rock, glam rock, funk rock
- Length: 37:33
- Label: Pink Elephant
- Producer: Rudy Bennett

Shocking Blue chronology
| Dream on Dreamer (1974) | Good Times (1974) |

Singles from Inkpot
- 1. "Good Times" b/w "Come My Way" Released: 1974

Good Times is the eighth and final studio album by Dutch rock band Shocking Blue, released in 1974. The album is the first and only album recorded without the founding member, primary songwriter and guitarist Robbie van Leeuwen, who was replaced by Martin van Wijk.

== Track listing ==
All songs written by Martin van Wijk, except where noted.

Side one
| No. | Title | Writer(s) | Length |
|---|---|---|---|
| 1. | "Good Times" | Harry Vanda, George Young | 3:27 |
| 2. | "You'll Come" | M. Black | 2:06 |
| 3. | "My Life" | | 2:35 |
| 4. | "Morning Sun" | | 3:32 |
| 5. | "Loving Girl" | Ron Floegel, Andrew Samuels, Tom Phillips | 3:30 |
| 6. | "Beggin'" | Peggy Farina, Bob Gaudio | 4:13 |

Side two
| No. | Title | Writer(s) | Length |
|---|---|---|---|
| 7. | "This America" | | 2:57 |
| 8. | "Nashville Rebel" | Waylon Jennings (Harlan Howard?) | 2:27 |
| 9. | "Ball of Confusion" | | 3:25 |
| 10. | "Mississippi Delta" | Bobbie Gentry | 2:50 |
| 11. | "I Won't Be Lonely Long" | | 2:57 |
| 12. | "Come My Way" | | 3:19 |

== Personnel ==
Shocking Blue

- Mariska Veres - vocals
- Martin van Wijk - lead guitar, backing vocals
- Cor van der Beek - drums
- Henk Smitskamp - bass guitar
