= Inkpot (album) =

Studio album by Shocking Blue
- Released: 20 March 1972
- Recorded: 1 – 25 October, 1 December 1971, 7 – 14 January 1972
- Studios: Sound Push Studios, Blaricum, Netherlands
- Genre: Rock
- Length: 28:38
- Label: Pink Elephant
- Producer: Shocking Blue

Shocking Blue chronology
Third Album (1971)	Inkpot (1972)	Attila (1972)

Singles from Inkpot
- 1. "Inkpot" b/w "Give My Love to the Sunrise" Released: 1972

Inkpot is the fifth studio album by Dutch rock band Shocking Blue, released in 1972.

The American and Dutch versions have different track listings.

Three tracks on the album are cover songs, more than usual.

The album's title song may be familiar to people in Hong Kong, as a version of it has been used as the longtime theme song of televised Mark Six lottery drawing programme, since the commencement of the programme on 13 July 1976.

== Track listing ==
All songs written by Robbie van Leeuwen, except where noted.

=== Side one ===
1. "I Ain't Never" (Mel Tillis, Webb Pierce) - 2:15
2. "Navajo Tears" - 2:38
3. "Shadows" - 2:27
4. "Blue Jean" - 2:33
5. "Jambalaya" (Hank Williams) - 2:25
6. "Inkpot" - 2:37

=== Side two ===
1. "Tobacco Road" (John D. Loudermilk) - 2:31
2. "Hey" - 2:28
3. "Who Save My Soul" - 1:55
4. "Red Leaves I+II" - 2:35
5. "The Queen" - 2:03
6. "I Melt Like Butter" - 2:10

== Personnel ==
Shocking Blue

- Mariska Veres - lead vocals
- Robbie van Leeuwen - lead vocals on "Hey", guitar, mandolin, backing vocals
- Cor van der Beek - drums
- Henk Smitskamp - bass guitar
