= Shocking Blue (album) =

Studio album by Shocking Blue
- Released: 27 November 1967
- Recorded: 1967
- Studio: Phonograph Studio, Hilversum
- Genre: Nederbeat; blues rock
- Length: 35:43
- Label: Polydor

Shocking Blue chronology
| Shocking Blue (1967) | At Home (1969) |

Singles from Shocking Blue
- 1. "Love Is in the Air" b/w "What You Gonna Do" Released: 1967

Shocking Blue is the debut studio album by Dutch rock band Shocking Blue, released in November 1967 on Polydor. This was the only album by the band with Fred de Wilde on lead vocals. Mariska Veres replaced de Wilde in the band's next album, At Home.

== Release ==
In Germany and Scandinavia the record was released in 1970 under the title Beat with Us, omitting songs "Whisky Don't Wash My Brains" and "League of Angels" from side one. In Japan the album was released in German form as well but with the original title.

The album was reissued in 2006 on CD with the non-album single "Lucy Brown Is Back in Town" and its B-side as bonus tracks.

== Track listing ==
All songs written by Robbie van Leeuwen, except where noted.

Side one
| No. | Title | Writer(s) | Length |
|---|---|---|---|
| 1. | "Love Is in the Air" | Robbie van Leeuwen, A.M. van Driel | 2:36 |
| 2. | "Ooh Wee There's Music in Me" | | 2:32 |
| 3. | "What You Gonna Do" | | 2:17 |
| 4. | "Whisky Don't Wash My Brains" | | 0:58 |
| 5. | "Little Maggie" | | 2:47 |
| 6. | "Jail My Second Home" | Robbie van Leeuwen, Dimitri | 2:23 |
| 7. | "What's Wrong Bertha" | Robbie van Leeuwen, Barry Hay | 2:24 |
| 8. | "League of Angels" | | 2:06 |

Side two
| No. | Title | Writer(s) | Length |
|---|---|---|---|
| 9. | "Rockin' Pneumonia and the Boogie Woogie Flu" | Huey "Piano" Smith, Johnny Vincent | 1:58 |
| 10. | "That's Allright" | Arthur Crudup | 2:23 |
| 11. | "Crazy Drunken Man Dreams" | Robbie van Leeuwen, Barry Hay | 2:51 |
| 12. | "Beggarman" | Robbie van Leeuwen, Dimitri | 2:31 |
| 13. | "Hold Me, Hug Me, Rock Me" | Gene Vincent, Bill "Tex" Davis | 2:01 |
| 14. | "Where My Baby's Gone" | Robbie van Leeuwen, Dimitri | 5:00 |

Bonus tracks on the 2006 CD Reissue
| No. | Title | Length |
|---|---|---|
| 13. | "Lucy Brown Is Back in Town" | 2:52 |
| 14. | "Fix Your Hair Darling" | 2:18 |

== Personnel ==
Shocking Blue

- Fred de Wilde - lead vocals, rhythm guitar
- Robbie van Leeuwen - guitar, backing vocals
- Klaasje van der Wal - bass guitar
- Cor van der Beek - drums
