= At Home (Shocking Blue album) =

Studio album by Shocking Blue
- Released: 30 September 1969
- Recorded: 1969
- Studio: Sound Push Studios, Blaricum, Netherlands
- Genre: Psychedelic rock; pop rock; blues rock; folk rock
- Length: 30:30 (Original); 36:21 (Reissue)
- Label: Pink Elephant
- Producer: Shocking Blue

Shocking Blue chronology
Shocking Blue (1967)	At Home (1969)	Scorpio's Dance (1970)

Professional ratings
Review scores
Source	Rating
Allmusic	4/5 stars
Rolling Stone	(favorable)
PopMatters	(favorable)

At Home is the second studio album by Dutch rock band Shocking Blue, released in 1969 on the Pink Elephant label. It is their first album to feature Mariska Veres, the group's signature frontwoman and lead singer.

== Overview ==
The album is the group's first record with singer Mariska Veres. Robbie van Leeuwen acquired Veres in an attempt to ape the form of the female-fronted Jefferson Airplane. With Veres's notable vocal performance and stunning looks, the band finally had an adequate frontwoman.

At Home was a mixture of influences ranging from pop rock to psychedelic rock. There is also early evidence of their interest in Americana, with tracks like "California Here I Come" and "Harley Davidson".

The hit single "Venus" was omitted from the original Dutch pressings of the album, but was appended to the international versions both as an opening or closing track to the side one. Singles "Long and Lonesome Road" and "Mighty Joe" were also featured on several versions of the album.

At Home was repackaged for the American market as a self titled album rearranging tracklisting, omitting "I'll Write Your Name Through the Fire" and including singles of that period. The Argentinian version has the same tracklisting with different order, in Mono, different cover and titled "Venus" on the cover .

Since the first reissue of At Home in 1989 "Venus" and "Long and Lonesome Road" were constantly present on the main tracklistings, both on CD and LP. Additional CD bonus tracks were the b-sides of that period.

== Uses in media and cover versions ==
The John Mayer version of the song "Acka Raga" was used as the theme song for the BBC1 quiz show Ask the Family.

The track "Love Buzz" gained notoriety when it was covered by grunge band Nirvana.

== Track listing ==
All songs were written by Robbie van Leeuwen, except for "Acka Raga" by John Mayer.

=== Original version ===
Side one

1. "Boll Weevil" – 2:40
2. "I'll Write Your Name Through the Fire"– 2:50
3. "Acka Raga" – 3:10
4. "Love Machine" – 3:15
5. "I'm a Woman" – 3:00

Side two

1. "California Here I Come" – 3:15
2. "Poor Boy" – 4:50
3. "Love Buzz" – 3:40
4. "The Butterfly and I" – 3:50

=== American The Shocking Blue version ===
Side one

1. "Long and Lonesome Road" – 2:44
2. "Love Machine" – 3:15
3. "The Butterfly and I" – 3:50
4. "Venus" – 3:07
5. "California Here I Come" – 3:15
6. "Poor Boy" – 4:50

Side two

1. "Mighty Joe" – 3:04
2. "Boll Weevil" – 2:40
3. "Acka Raga" – 3:10
4. "Love Buzz" – 3:40
5. "I'm a Woman" – 3:00
6. "Send Me a Postcard"– 2:33

=== Argentinian "Venus" version ===
Side one

1. "Venus"
2. "Love machine (La máquina del amor)"
3. "The butterfly and I (La mariposa y yo)"
4. "I'm a woman (Soy una mujer)"
5. "Poor boy (Pobre muchacho)"

Side two

1. "Mighty Joe (Joe el poderoso)"
2. "Bool weevil (El gusanito)"
3. "Acka Ragh"
4. "Love buzz (Susurro amoroso)"
5. "California here I come (California aquí llego)"
6. "Send me a postcard (Mándame una postal)"

=== Reissue edition ===
1. "Boll Weevil" – 2:40
2. "I'll Write Your Name Through the Fire"– 2:50
3. "Acka Raga" – 3:10
4. "Love Machine" – 3:15
5. "I'm a Woman" – 3:00
6. "Venus" – 3:07
7. "California Here I Come" – 3:15
8. "Poor Boy" – 4:50
9. "Long and Lonesome Road" – 2:44
10. "Love Buzz" – 3:40
11. "The Butterfly and I" – 3:50

CD reissue bonus tracks

12. "Harley Davidson" – 2:39
13. "Fireball of Love" – 3:00
14. "Hot Sand" – 2:35
15. "Wild Wind" – 2:15

== Personnel ==
- Mariska Veres - lead vocals
- Robbie van Leeuwen - guitar, sitar, backing vocals
- Klaasje van der Wal - bass guitar
- Cor van der Beek - drums

=== Studio musicians ===
- Cees Schrama - keyboards

== Charts ==
Chart (1970)	Peak position
Australian Albums (Kent Music Report)	30
Dutch Albums (Album Top 100)	6
German Albums (Offizielle Top 100)	30
Norwegian Albums (VG-lista)	13

== Certifications ==
Region	Certification	Certified units/sales
Netherlands (NVPI)	Gold	25,000
