= True Confessions (album) =

Studio album by Bananarama
- Released: 30 June 1986
- Studios: Odyssey, London
- Genres: Dance-pop; synth-pop
- Length: 47:47
- Label: London
- Producers: Tony Swain; Steve Jolley; Stock Aitken Waterman

Bananarama chronology
Bananarama (1984)	True Confessions (1986)	Wow! (1987)

Singles from True Confessions
- 1. "Do Not Disturb" Released: August 1985; 2. "Venus" Released: May 1986; 3. "More Than Physical" Released: July 1986; 4. "A Trick of the Night" Released: December 1986 (US)

True Confessions is the third studio album by the English pop group Bananarama. It was released on 30 June 1986 by London Records. The album was primarily produced by Tony Swain and Steve Jolley, and also marked Bananarama's first collaboration with Stock Aitken Waterman, who produced two of the album's tracks.

Four singles were released from True Confessions: "Do Not Disturb", the Shocking Blue cover "Venus", "More Than Physical", and "A Trick of the Night". "Venus" became the group's most commercially successful single to date, peaking at number one on the Billboard Hot 100 in the United States. True Confessions initially reached number 46 on the UK Albums Chart and number 15 on the US Billboard 200, becoming the group's highest-peaking album on the latter chart. Following the release of the album's 40th anniversary edition in September 2026, it finally hit the top 10 of the UK Albums Chart, reaching number six and making it the band's highest-charting album in their homeland.

== Background and recording ==
All but two tracks on True Confessions were produced by Tony Swain and Steve Jolley, who had previously contributed production to Bananarama's 1983 debut album Deep Sea Skiving and subsequently co-produced the group's 1984 eponymous second album. "More Than Physical", later given a garage remix for its single version, was Bananarama's first songwriting collaboration with the Stock Aitken Waterman (SAW) production team, who also produced "Venus", a cover of the 1969 Shocking Blue song. The Jolley and Swain production "A Trick of the Night" would later be re-recorded and remixed by SAW for its single release in the UK.

In contrast to the two dance-oriented songs produced by SAW, the majority of the songs produced by Jolley and Swain tend towards rock-based, serious-minded pop. The lyrical content addresses overcoming obstacles in relationships ("Ready or Not", "Promised Land") and tackles social issues such as the pitfalls of drug addiction ("Hooked on Love") and the struggles of overcoming generational disillusion ("In a Perfect World"). Two ballads are included: the aforementioned "A Trick of the Night", which is a cautionary midtempo number about a male friend trying to survive on city streets, and the jazzy, sophisti-pop track "Dance with a Stranger". Another ballad, "Ghost", was initially used as the B-side of the "Do Not Disturb" single, but eventually made its way onto various subsequent releases.

== Critical reception ==
Professional ratings
Review scores
Source	Rating
AllMusic	4/5 stars
The Baltimore Sun	3.5/5 stars
Classic Pop	4/5 stars
Number One	4/5 stars
The Philadelphia Inquirer	3/4 stars
Record Mirror	3/5
The Rolling Stone Album Guide	2.5/5 stars
Smash Hits	8/10
Stylus Magazine	C
Windsor Star	B+

Critic Jerry Smith wrote a warm and positive review of True Confessions for British music newspaper Music Week: "... within the confines of what they do they're rather good—notice how they're always five minutes ahead of high street fashion, so maybe it's their suitability as teen role models that's kept them afloat on a tide of paper thin melodies for so long. Fashionable targets they may be, but their latest hit single says they still know what their public wants." In a review for Record Mirror, Lesley O'Toole was less enthusiastic, stating that the album, despite its title, is "no revelation whatsoever. Yet another slab of formula Bananas sees the girls executing cooing harmonies and fey storylines – all about as heavyweight as a mosquito, though marginally less bothersome." Tom Hibbert of Smash Hits praised the album as being "undeniably, convincingly listenable" and "a proper pop 'album'", adding that Bananarama "make 'intriguing' pop – and can even sustain the charm across an entire LP."

== Track listing ==
All tracks are written by Steve Jolley, Tony Swain, Sara Dallin, Siobhan Fahey and Keren Woodward, except where noted.

No.	Title	Writer(s)	Length
1.	"True Confessions"		5:19
2.	"Ready or Not"		3:53
3.	"A Trick of the Night"	Jolley; Swain	4:38
4.	"Dance with a Stranger"		4:30
5.	"In a Perfect World"		6:02
6.	"Venus"	Robbie van Leeuwen	3:48
7.	"Do Not Disturb"	Jolley; Swain	3:23
8.	"A Cut Above the Rest"		3:40
9.	"Promised Land"		3:43
10.	"More Than Physical"	Mike Stock; Matt Aitken; Pete Waterman; Dallin; Fahey; Woodward	5:03
11.	"Hooked on Love"		3:48

2007 remastered reissue bonus tracks
No.	Title	Writer(s)	Length
12.	"Ghost"	Phil Bishop; Patrick Seymour; Dallin; Woodward; Fahey	4:03
13.	"White Train"	Dallin; Fahey; Woodward; Bishop; Seymour	3:51
14.	"More Than Physical" (single version †)	Stock; Aitken; Waterman; Dallin; Fahey; Woodward	3:19
15.	"Scarlett"	Bishop; Dallin; Woodward; Fahey	4:12
16.	"A Trick of the Night" (single version ††)	Jolley; Swain	4:17
17.	"Set on You"	Stock; Aitken; Waterman; Dallin; Fahey; Woodward	3:56
18.	"Riskin' a Romance"	Ollie Marland; Fahey; Paul Waller	3:53

=== Notes ===
† "More Than Physical" (Single Version) is actually the (Worldwide Single Version)

†† "A Trick of the Night" (Single Version) is actually the previously unreleased (UK Video Version)

=== 2013 deluxe edition ===
Disc one
No.	Title	Writer(s)	Length
1.	"True Confessions"		5:19
2.	"Ready or Not"		3:53
3.	"A Trick of the Night"	Jolley; Swain	4:38
4.	"Dance with a Stranger"		4:30
5.	"In a Perfect World"		6:02
6.	"Venus"	van Leeuwen	3:48
7.	"Do Not Disturb"	Jolley; Swain	3:23
8.	"A Cut Above the Rest"		3:40
9.	"Promised Land"		3:43
10.	"More Than Physical"	Stock; Aitken; Waterman; Dallin; Fahey; Woodward	5:03
11.	"Hooked on Love"		3:48
12.	"Too Much of a Good Thing"		5:12
13.	"Vicious Circle"	Jolley; Swain	3:51
14.	"Ghost"	Bishop; Seymour; Dallin; Woodward; Fahey	4:03
15.	"White Train"	Dallin; Fahey; Woodward; Bishop; Seymour	3:51
16.	"Scarlett" (extended version)	Bishop; Dallin; Woodward; Fahey	5:19
17.	"Riskin' a Romance"	Marland; Fahey; Waller	3:53
18.	"Set on You"	Stock; Aitken; Waterman; Dallin; Fahey; Woodward	3:56

Disc two
No.	Title	Writer(s)	Length
1.	"Do Not Disturb" (extended version)	Jolley; Swain	6:07
2.	"Venus" (extended version)	van Leeuwen	7:23
3.	"More Than Physical" (garage mix)	Stock; Aitken; Waterman; Dallin; Fahey; Woodward	8:46
4.	"A Trick of the Night" (The Number One mix)	Jolley; Swain	8:14
5.	"Ready or Not" (Pettibone & Forest mix)		6:34
6.	"Venus" (Fire & Brimstone mix)	van Leeuwen	6:43
7.	"More Than Physical" (Musclebound mix)	Stock; Aitken; Waterman; Dallin; Fahey; Woodward	9:57
8.	"A Trick of the Night" (dub)	Jolley; Swain	4:33
9.	"Venus" (dub)	van Leeuwen	8:15
10.	"More Than Physical" (dub)	Stock; Aitken; Waterman; Dallin; Fahey; Woodward	4:57
11.	"Ready or Not" (Pettibone & Forest dub)		4:45
12.	"Venus" (original mix)	van Leeuwen	3:18

DVD
No.	Title	Director	Length
1.	"Do Not Disturb" (music video)	Simon Milne
2.	"Venus" (music video)	Peter Care
3.	"More Than Physical" (music video)	Peter Care
4.	"A Trick of the Night" (music video; UK version)	Paul Heiney
5.	"A Trick of the Night" (music video; US version)	Peter Care
6.	"Venus" (music video; 12″ version)	Peter Care
7.	"Venus" (on Top of the Pops)	Brian Whitehouse
8.	"More Than Physical" (on Wogan)	Kevin Bishop
9.	"The Making of 'A Trick of the Night'" (on In at the Deep End)	Nick Handel

=== 2018 collector's edition and 2026 single CD bonus tracks ===
No.	Title	Writer(s)	Length
12.	"Ghost"	Bishop; Seymour; Dallin; Woodward; Fahey	4:03
13.	"White Train"	Dallin; Fahey; Woodward; Bishop; Seymour	3:51
14.	"Scarlett"	Bishop; Dallin; Woodward; Fahey	4:14
15.	"Riskin' a Romance"	Marland; Fahey; Waller	3:53
16.	"Venus" (extended version)	van Leeuwen	7:23
17.	"A Trick of the Night" (The Number One mix)	Jolley; Swain	8:14

=== 2026 40th anniversry edition 3CD bonus tracks ===
No.	Title	Writer(s)	Length
12.	"Ghost"	Bishop; Seymour; Dallin; Woodward; Fahey	4:03
13.	"White Train"	Dallin; Fahey; Woodward; Bishop; Seymour	3:51
14.	"Scarlett"	Bishop; Dallin; Woodward; Fahey	4:14
15.	"Vicious Circle"	Jolley; Swain	3:51
16.	"Riskin' a Romance"	Marland; Fahey; Waller	3:53
17.	"Set on You"	Stock; Aitken; Waterman; Dallin; Fahey; Woodward	3:56
18.	"More Than Physical" (DJ Edit)	Stock; Aitken; Waterman; Dallin; Fahey; Woodward	3:24
19.	"A Trick of the Night" (#2) (Produced by Stock Aitken Waterman)	Jolley; Swain	4:34

Disc two: 1986 Extended Versions and Remixes
No.	Title	Writer(s)	Length
1.	"Venus" (extended version)	van Leeuwen	7:23
2.	"More Than Physical" (garage mix)	Stock; Aitken; Waterman; Dallin; Fahey; Woodward	8:46
3.	"A Trick of the Night" (The Number One mix) (Produced by Stock Aitken Waterman)	Jolley; Swain	8:14
4.	"Do Not Disturb" (extended version)	Jolley; Swain	6:07
5.	"Venus" (Hellfire Mix)	van Leeuwen	9:18
6.	"More Than Physical" (Musclebound mix)	Stock; Aitken; Waterman; Dallin; Fahey; Woodward	9:57
7.	"A Trick of the Night" (Tricky Mix)	Jolley; Swain	7:17
8.	"Scarlett" (extended version)	Bishop; Dallin; Woodward; Fahey	5:19
9.	"Venus" (Fire & Brimstone mix)	van Leeuwen	6:43
10.	"Do Not Disturb" (Bananamix)	Jolley; Swain	10:51

Disc Three: 2026 Mixes and Rarities
No.	Title	Writer(s)	Length
1.	"Venus" (Richard X's Burning Flame '26 Edit)	van Leeuwen	3:18
2.	"More Than Physical" (Luke Mornay's Jet Set '26 Edit)	Stock; Aitken; Waterman; Dallin; Fahey; Woodward
3.	"More Than Physical" (The Alias Deep Down '26 Edit)	Stock; Aitken; Waterman; Dallin; Fahey; Woodward
4.	"More Than Physical" (Amyl '26 Edit)	Stock; Aitken; Waterman; Dallin; Fahey; Woodward
5.	"Venus" (Boys Noize Rework '23 Edit)	van Leeuwen	3:12
6.	"A Trick of the Night" (U.S. 7" mix)	Jolley; Swain	4:23
7.	"Promised Land" (extended mix; previously unreleased)
8.	"Vicious Circle" (extended version; previously unreleased)	Jolley; Swain
9.	"Ready or Not" (original Jolley & Swain 12" mix)		5:33
10.	"A Trick of the Night" (original Jolley & Swain 12" mix)	Jolley; Swain	5:54
11.	"Do Not Disturb" (original mix)	Jolley; Swain	3:44
12.	"Venus" (original mix)	van Leeuwen	3:18
13.	"More Than Physical" (original 12" mix)	Stock; Aitken; Waterman; Dallin; Fahey; Woodward	6:10
14.	"A Trick of the Night" (original PWL remix; produced by Stock Aitken Waterman)	Jolley; Swain	4:29
15.	"Venus" (original 12" mix)	van Leeuwen	6:40
16.	"Ready or Not" (Pettibone & Forest mix)		6:34
17.	"Do Not Disturb" (Radio 1 Jingles)	Jolley; Swain	2:21
18.	"Venus" (Radio 1 Jingles)	van Leeuwen	1:15
19.	"More Than Physical" (Radio 1 Jingle)	Stock; Aitken; Waterman; Dallin; Fahey; Woodward	0:47
20.	"A Trick of the Night" (Radio 1 Jingle)	Jolley; Swain	0:43

=== 2026 40th anniversary edition vinyl bonus tracks ===
Side 3: Venus
No.	Title	Writer(s)	Length
1.	"Venus" (Richard X's Burning Flame '26 Mix)	van Leeuwen	5:39
2.	"Venus" (Boys Noize Rework '23)	van Leeuwen	4:21
3.	"Venus" (Leo Zero Disco Remix '19)	van Leeuwen	5:59
4.	"Venus" (extended version)	van Leeuwen	7:23

Side 4: More Than Physical
No.	Title	Writer(s)	Length
1.	"More Than Physical" (Luke Mornay's Jet Set '26 Mix)	Stock; Aitken; Waterman; Dallin; Fahey; Woodward
2.	"More Than Physical" (The Alias Deep Down ‘26 Mix)	Stock; Aitken; Waterman; Dallin; Fahey; Woodward
3.	"More Than Physical" (garage mix)	Stock; Aitken; Waterman; Dallin; Fahey; Woodward	8:46
4.	"More Than Physical" (Original 12” Mix)	Stock; Aitken; Waterman; Dallin; Fahey; Woodward	6:10

== Personnel ==
Credits adapted from the liner notes of True Confessions.

=== Bananarama ===
- Keren Woodward
- Sara Dallin
- Siobhan Fahey

=== Additional musicians ===
- Tony Swain – keyboards (tracks 1–5, 7–9, 11)
- Steve Jolley – guitar (tracks 1–5, 7–9, 11)
- Keith Thomas – saxophone (tracks 1–5, 7–9, 11)
- Matt Aitken – guitar (track 6); keyboards (track 10)
- Mike Stock – keyboards (tracks 6, 10)
- Gary Hughes – keyboards (track 6)
- Drum Machine – drums (tracks 6, 10)
- Andy Stennett – keyboards (track 10)

=== Technical ===
- Tony Swain – production (tracks 1–5, 7–9, 11)
- Steve Jolley – production (tracks 1–5, 7–9, 11)
- Stock Aitken Waterman – production (tracks 6, 10)
- Richard Lengyel – recording engineering
- Chips – engineering assistance
- Paul Batchelor – engineering assistance
- Tim Young – mastering (at CBS Studios, London)

=== Artwork ===
- Dennis Cockell – tattoos design
- Martin Brading – photography
- Peter Barrett – sleeve design

== Charts ==
=== Weekly charts ===
Chart (1986)	Peak position
Australian Albums (Kent Music Report)	19
Canada Top Albums/CDs (RPM)	10
Dutch Albums (Album Top 100)	43
European Albums (Music & Media)	31
Finnish Albums (Suomen virallinen lista)	20
German Albums (Offizielle Top 100)	25
Japanese Albums (Oricon)	37
New Zealand Albums (RMNZ)	33
Swiss Albums (Schweizer Hitparade)	6
UK Albums (Official Charts)	46
US Billboard 200	15

Chart (2026)	Peak position
Belgian Albums (Ultratop Flanders)	110
Belgian Albums (Ultratop Wallonia)	23
Scottish Albums (Official Charts)	3
Swedish Physical Albums (Sverigetopplistan)	12
UK Albums (Official Charts)	6
UK Independent Albums (Official Charts)	2

=== Year-end charts ===
Chart (1986)	Position
Canada Top Albums/CDs (RPM)	59

== Certifications ==
Region	Certification	Certified units/sales
Canada (Music Canada)	Platinum	100,000^{^}
United States (RIAA)	Gold	500,000^{^}
^{^} Shipments figures based on certification alone.
