= Galaxy-Lin =

Galaxy-Lin was a Dutch pop rock band in which electric mandolins played a central role. The band was founded in 1973 by Robbie van Leeuwen, and released two records before breaking up in 1976.

== History ==
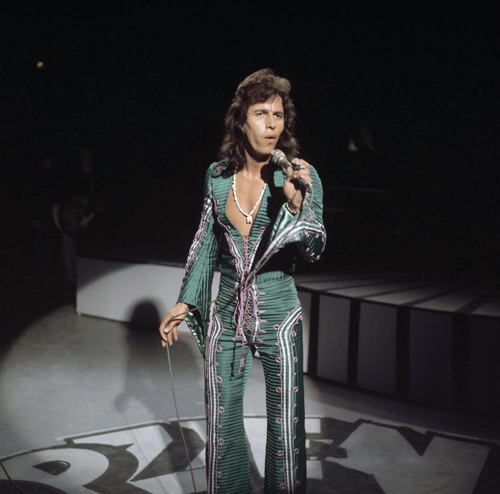
Bennett in 1973

Most of the band members had gained experience in other prominent bands. Robbie van Leeuwen, with Shocking Blue, scored a #1 in the US with "Venus". Singer Rudy Bennett and van Leeuwen, then in the band Ricochets, had opened in 1964 for the Rolling Stones in the Kurhaus of Scheveningen, and later had two hits with The Motions ("Wasted words" and "Why don't you take it"). Dick Remelink, who played saxophone and flute, came from Ekseption. Bassist Peter Wassenaar had played in hardrock band Blue Planet, and keyboard player Skip van Rooy with The Buffoons . The line-up was completed with drummer Peter Rijnvis and mandolin players Hugo van Haastert and Hans van Vos.

Galaxy-Lin released two albums. Galaxy-Lin was released in 1974, and from it came the single "Travelling song"/"Utopia" . All songs on the album were written by Robbie van Leeuwen, who also wrote all but one of the song on the second album, G. Two singles were released off this album, "Long hot summer"/"Utopia" and "Hunting song"/"Don't". "Long hot summer" reached #16 on the Dutch Hitparade. Van Leeuwen produced all the albums with recording engineer John Sonnevelt. Both were released in 2013 as a double album.

The band broke up in 1976. Rudy Bennett and Bea Willemstein continued as the duo, Bennett and Bee; Robbie van Leeuwen started a project called Mistral, and Skip van Rooij joined The Buffoons.

== Discography ==
=== Albums ===
- Galaxy-Lin (1974)
- G (1975)

=== Singles ===
- "Travelling song"/"Utopia" (1974)
- "Long hot summer"/"Utopia" (1975)
- "Hunting song"/"Don't" (1975)
