= Third Album (Shocking Blue album) =

Studio album by Shocking Blue
- Released: 15 April 1971
- Recorded: January–March 1971
- Studios: Sound Push Studios, Blaricum, Netherlands
- Length: 33:29
- Label: Pink Elephant
- Producer: Shocking Blue

Shocking Blue chronology
Scorpio's Dance (1970)	Third Album (1971)	Inkpot (1972)

Singles from Third Album
- 1. ""Never Marry A Railroad Man" b/w "Roll Engine Roll"" Released: May 29, 1970; 2. ""Shocking You" b/w "Waterloo"" Released: February 28, 1971; 3. ""Blossom Lady" b/w "If This A Dream"" Released: August 13, 1971; 4. ""Serenade" b/w "Sleepless at Midnight"" Released: September 27, 1971

Professional ratings
Review scores
Source	Rating
Allmusic	3/5 stars

Third Album is an album by Shocking Blue, released in 1971. Despite the title, it the group's fourth overall, but their third with singer Mariska Veres. In Argentina it was released with almost complete different tracks under the name of "Shocking you", including B sides and different cover. "Blossom lady" was misspelled as "Blosson lady".

== Track listing ==
All tracks are written by Robbie van Leeuwen, except "I Saw Your Face" by Regis Mull.

Side one
No.	Title	Length
1.	"Shocking You"	2:59
2.	"Velvet Heaven"	3:23
3.	"Love Sweet Love"	3:12
4.	"I Saw Your Face"	2:56
5.	"Simon Lee and the Gang"	1:49
6.	"Serenade"	3:26

Side two
No.	Title	Length
7.	"Don't You See"	2:43
8.	"The Bird of Paradise"	2:49
9.	"Moonlight Night"	4:55
10.	"Sleepless at Midnight"	2:30
11.	"I'll Follow the Sun"	2:44

Bonus tracks
No.	Title	Length
12.	"Never Marry a Railroad Man"	3:03
13.	"Roll Engine Roll"	3:14
14.	"Waterloo"	3:24
15.	"Blossom Lady"	3:33
16.	"Is This a dream?"	3:45
17.	"Poor Boy (Long Version)"	4:50

=== Argentinian version ===
Side one

1. "Shocking you"
2. "Out of sight, out of mind (Fuera de vista, fuera de mente)"
3. "A serenade (Una serenata)"
4. "Sally was a good old girl (Sally era una buena chica)"
5. "Pickin' tomatoes (Recogiendo tomates)"
6. "The bird from paradise (El pájaro del paraíso)"

Side two

1. "Blosson lady (Mujer floreciente)"
2. "Scorpio's dance"
3. "Roll engine roll (Gira máquina gira)"
4. "Hot sand (Arena caliente)"
5. "Seven is a magic number (Siete es un número mágico)"
6. "Never marry a railroad man (Nunca te cases con un ferroviario)"

== Personnel ==
Shocking Blue

- Mariska Veres - lead vocals
- Robbie van Leeuwen - guitar, banjo, mandolin, sitar, backing vocals, lead vocals on "I Saw Your Face"
- Cor van der Beek - drums, percussion
- Klaasje van der Wal - bass guitar
- Leo van de Ketterij - guitar
