= Rudy Bennett =

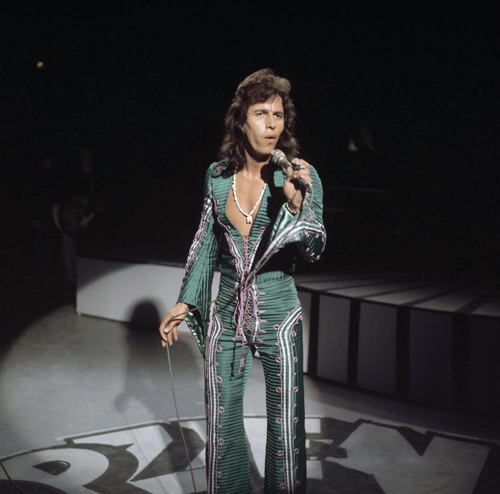
- Bennett in 1973

Background information
- Born: 27 December 1942 (age 83); The Hague, Netherlands
- Genres: Nederbeat
- Instrument: Vocals
- Years active: 1960s-present
- Formerly of: The Motions, Galaxy-Lin

Rudy Bennett (born Cornelis Johannes Rudy van den Berg, 27 December 1942) is a Dutch singer, who led the Nederbeat groups The Motions and Galaxy-Lin.

== Career ==
Bennett formed The Motions with Robbie van Leeuwen, Henk Smitskamp, and Sieb Warner. They were the first Nederbeat band to achieve chart success, and had their first major selling single in 1965. While he was still in the Motions, he had solo hit in 1967 with "How Can We Hang On to a Dream". The song went to number five in the Netherlands.

When the Motions disbanded in 1970, he formed Galaxy-Lin with van Leeuwen. They released three singles and two studio albums before disbanding in 1976. In the 1980s, he was in the duo Bennet & Bee with Beatrix Willemstein. They had two top 40 hits. In 1997, Bennett joined Clous van Mechelen's Second Hand Rock & Soul Band.

== Discography ==
=== The Motions ===
Albums

- 1965 - "Introduction to The Motions"
- 1966 - "Their Own Way"
- 1967 - "Motions Songbook"
- 1967 - "Impressions of Wonderful"
- 1968 - "The Motions Live!"
- 1969 - "Electric Baby"
- 1970 - "Sensation"

Extended plays

- 1965 - "I've Waited So Long" + "It's Gone" / "For Another Man" + "I've Got Misery"
- 1966 - "Wasted Words" + "I'll Follow the Sun" / "There's No Place to Hide" + "Everything That's Mine"
- 1966 - "Every Step I Take" + "Hard Time Blues" / "Stop Your Crying" + "Everything That's Mine"

Singles

- 1965 - "It's Gone" / "I've Got Misery"
- 1965 - "You Bother Me" / "We Fell in Love"
- 1965 - "For Another Man" / "I've Waited So Long"
- 1965 - "Love Won't Stop" / "No Matter Where You Run"
- 1965 - "Wasted Words" / "I'll Follow the Sun"
- 1966 - "Everything That's Mine" / "There's No Place to Hide"
- 1966 - "Why Don't You Take It?" / "My Love Is Growing"
- 1966 - "Every Step I Take" / "Stop Your Crying"
- 1966 - "It's the Same Old Song" / "Someday Child"
- 1967 - "I Want You, I Need You" / "Suzie Baby"
- 1967 - "Wonderful Impressions" / "Nellie the Horse"
- 1967 - "Tonight We'll Be Stoned" / "One Million Red Balloons"
- 1968 - "You're My Adee" / "Hey Conductor Man"
- 1968 - "Take Your Time" / "Make It Legal"
- 1968 - "Miracle Man" / "Something"
- 1968 - "I Ain't Got Time" / "Fantasy Club"
- 1968 - "Take the Fast Train" / "Hamburg City"
- 1969 - "It's Alright" / "Hey Everybody"
- 1969 - "Freedom" / "Little Boy's Life" + "What's Your Name"
- 1969 - "Eliza" / "Wedding of the Hundred Brides"
- 1969 - "I Can't Help It" / "Look Away"
- 1970 - "Try to Make You Happy" / "We All Come Together"

=== Galaxy-Lin ===
Albums

- 1974 - "Galaxy-Lin"
- 1975 - "G"

Singles

- 1974 - "Travelling song" / "Utopia"
- 1975 - "Long hot summer" / "Utopia"
- 1975 - "Hunting song" / "Don't"

=== Solo ===
Selected singles

- 1966 - "How Can We Hang On to a Dream"
