= Demon Lover =

Demon Lover may refer to:

- The Daemon Lover, a medieval British ballad
- The Daemon Lover, a short story by Shirley Jackson
- "The Demon Lover", a 1945 short story by Elizabeth Bowen
- "The Demon Lover", a 1966 poem by Adrienne Rich
- The Demon Lover, a 1977 film by Donald G. Jackson and Jerry Younkins
- My Demon Lover, a 1987 comedy horror film
- "Demon Lover", a 2010 short story by Cecelia Holland
- Demonlover, a 2002 film by Olivier Assayas
- "Demon Lover", a 1970 song by Shocking Blue from their album Scorpio's Dance
- "Demon Lover", a 2009 song Róisín Murphy
