= Mariska =

Mariska is a female given name. People bearing it include:

- Mariska (rapper) (born 1979), Finnish solo performer, former partner in Mariska & Pahat Sudet
- Mariska Aldrich (1881–1965), American dramatic soprano singer and actress
- Mariska Beijer, Dutch wheelchair basketball player
- Mariska Hargitay (born 1964), American film and television actress
- Mariska Huisman (born 1983), Dutch marathon skater and speedskater
- Mariska Hulscher (born 1964), Dutch TV presenter
- Mariska Karasz (1898–1960), Hungarian-American fashion designer, author, and textile artist
- Mariska Kornet (born 1988), Dutch cricketer
- Mariska Kramer (born 1974), Dutch triathlete, duathlete and long-distance runner
- Mariska Majoor (born 1968), Dutch founder of the Prostitution Information Center
- Mariska Mast (1985–2008), Dutch national, possibly a murder victim
- Mariska Rikkers (born 1977), Dutch politician
- Mariska Veres (1947–2006), Dutch singer, lead singer for Shocking Blue
- Mariska Vízváry (1877–1954), Hungarian actress

== See also ==
- Gregoria Mariska, Indonesian badminton player
