= The Motions (band) =

Dutch band

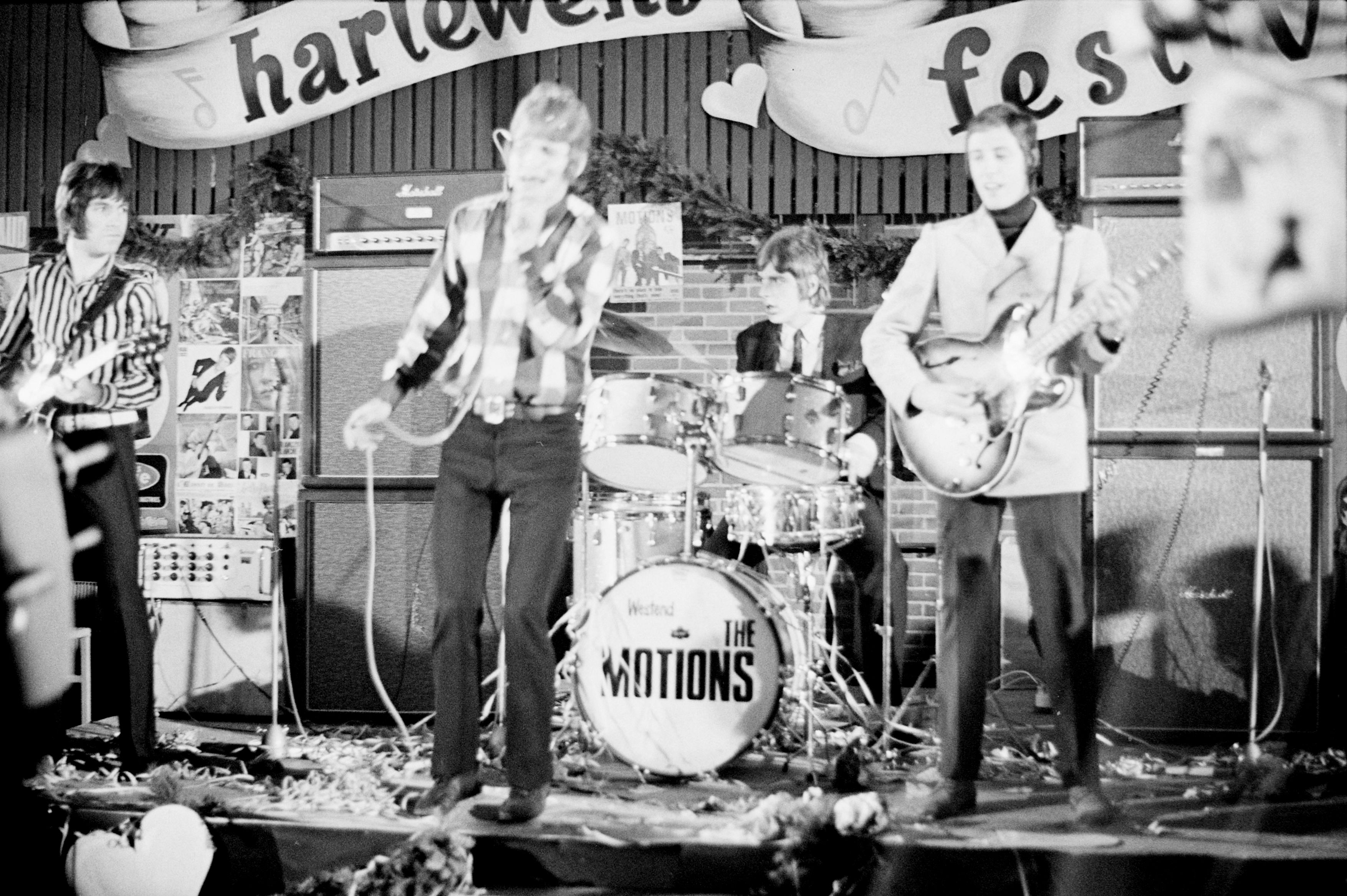
- The Motions at the Hartewens Festival in Haarlem, 1966

Background information
- Genres: Nederbeat
- Years active: 1964-1970
- Past members: Rudy Bennett; Robbie van Leeuwen; Henk Smitskamp; Sieb Warner and Han Gordinou de Gouberville

The Motions were a Dutch band from The Hague founded in 1964 and active until 1970. The lead singer was Rudy Bennett, with Robbie van Leeuwen on guitar, Henk Smitskamp on bass guitar, and Sieb Warner on drums. They were the first Nederbeat band to achieve chart success.

Their single "Wasted Words" was their first major hit in the Netherlands in 1965. Other songs include "Why Don't You Take It", "There's No Place to Hide", "Every Step I Take" and "It's The Same Old Song".

Guitar player Robbie van Leeuwen went on to achieve international success as a founder of Shocking Blue, with their song "Venus" in particular.

Rudy Bennett also released successful records. He had solo hit with in 1967 with "How Can We Hang On to a Dream", another charted song with Galaxy-Lin in the mid-1970s, and then further success as the duo Bennet & Bee later in the early 1980s.

== Discography ==
=== Albums ===
- 1965 - Introduction to The Motions - HAVOC HJH 2
- 1966 - Their Own Way - HAVOC IHLP 2
- 1967 - Greatest Hits - HAVOC HJH 136
- 1967 - Motions Songbook - TEENBEAT APLP 101
- 1967 - Impressions of Wonderful - HAVOC HALP 021
- 1968 - The Motions Live! (Studio recordings with added applause) - MARBLE ARCH MALH 201
- 1969 - Electric Baby - DECCA DU 170 023
- 1970 - Sensation - SIMOGRAM 00502
- 1973 - Terug in de Tijd - NEGRAM HJN 205
- 1979 - Golden Greats of The Motions - NEGRAM 5N 028 26153
- 1989 - The Original Hit Recordings and More - EMI 791 943 2
- 1992 - Wasted Words - DGR 6001
- 1993 - Impressions of Wonderful 1965-1967 (Original studio-tracks, alternates & unreleased takes!) - PSEUDONYM CDP 1004 DD
- 2001 - Introduction to The Motions + Their Own Way (+7) - PSEUDONYM CDP 1084 DD
- 2002 - Singles A's & B's (2 CDs) - HUNTER MUSIC HM 1386 2

=== Singles ===
- 1965 - "It's Gone" / "I've Got Misery" - HAVOC SH 105
- 1965 - "You Bother Me" / "We Fell in Love" - HAVOC SH 107
- 1965 - "For Another Man" / "I've Waited So Long" - HAVOC SH 108
- 1965 - "Love Won't Stop" / "No Matter Where You Run" - HAVOC SH 110
- 1965 - "Wasted Words" / "I'll Follow the Sun" - HAVOC SH 111
- 1965 - "I've Waited So Long" + "It's Gone" / "For Another Man" + "I've Got Misery" - VOGUE INT 18017 (Frankrijk)
- 1966 - "Everything That's Mine" / "There's No Place to Hide" - HAVOC SH 114
- 1966 - "Why Don't You Take It?" / "My Love Is Growing" - HAVOC SH 116
- 1966 - "Every Step I Take" / "Stop Your Crying" - HAVOC SH 121
- 1966 - "It's the Same Old Song" / "Someday Child" - HAVOC SH 122
- 1966 - "Wasted Words" + "I'll Follow the Sun" / "There's No Place to Hide" + "Everything That's Mine" (7-inch EP) - VOGUE INT 18069 (Frankrijk)
- 1966 - "Every Step I Take" + "Hard Time Blues" / "Stop Your Crying" + "Everything That's Mine" (7-inch EP) - VOGUE INT 18097 (Frankrijk)
- 1967 - "I Want You, I Need You" / "Suzie Baby" - HAVOC SH 130
- 1967 - "Wonderful Impressions" / "Nellie the Horse" - HAVOC SH 137
- 1967 - "Tonight We'll Be Stoned" / "One Million Red Balloons" - HAVOC SH 139
- 1968 - "You're My Adee" / "Hey Conductor Man" - HAVOC SH 142
- 1968 - "Take Your Time" / "Make It Legal" - HAVOC SH 146
- 1968 - "Miracle Man" / "Something" - DECCA AT 10 327
- 1968 - "I Ain't Got Time" / "Fantasy Club" - DECCA AT 10 337
- 1968 - "What's Your Name" / "Little Boy's Life" + "Illusion" - DECCA AT 10 358 (Never released)
- 1968 - "Take the Fast Train" / "Hamburg City" - DECCA AT 10 361
- 1969 - "It's Alright" / "Hey Everybody" - DECCA AT 10 374
- 1969 - "Freedom" / "Little Boy's Life" + "What's Your Name" - DECCA AT 10 382
- 1969 - "Eliza" / "Wedding of the Hundred Brides" - DECCA AT 10 396
- 1969 - "I Can't Help It" / "Look Away" - DECCA AT 10 405
- 1970 - "Try to Make You Happy" / "We All Come Together" - NEGRAM NG 195
- 1972 - "Wasted Words" / "It's the Same Old Song" + "My Love Is Growing" (7-inch EP) - NEGRAM NG 292
- 1981 - "Wasted Words" / "It's the Same Old Song" - NEGRAM 5C 006 26700
