= Leo van de Ketterij =

Dutch guitarist (1950–2021)

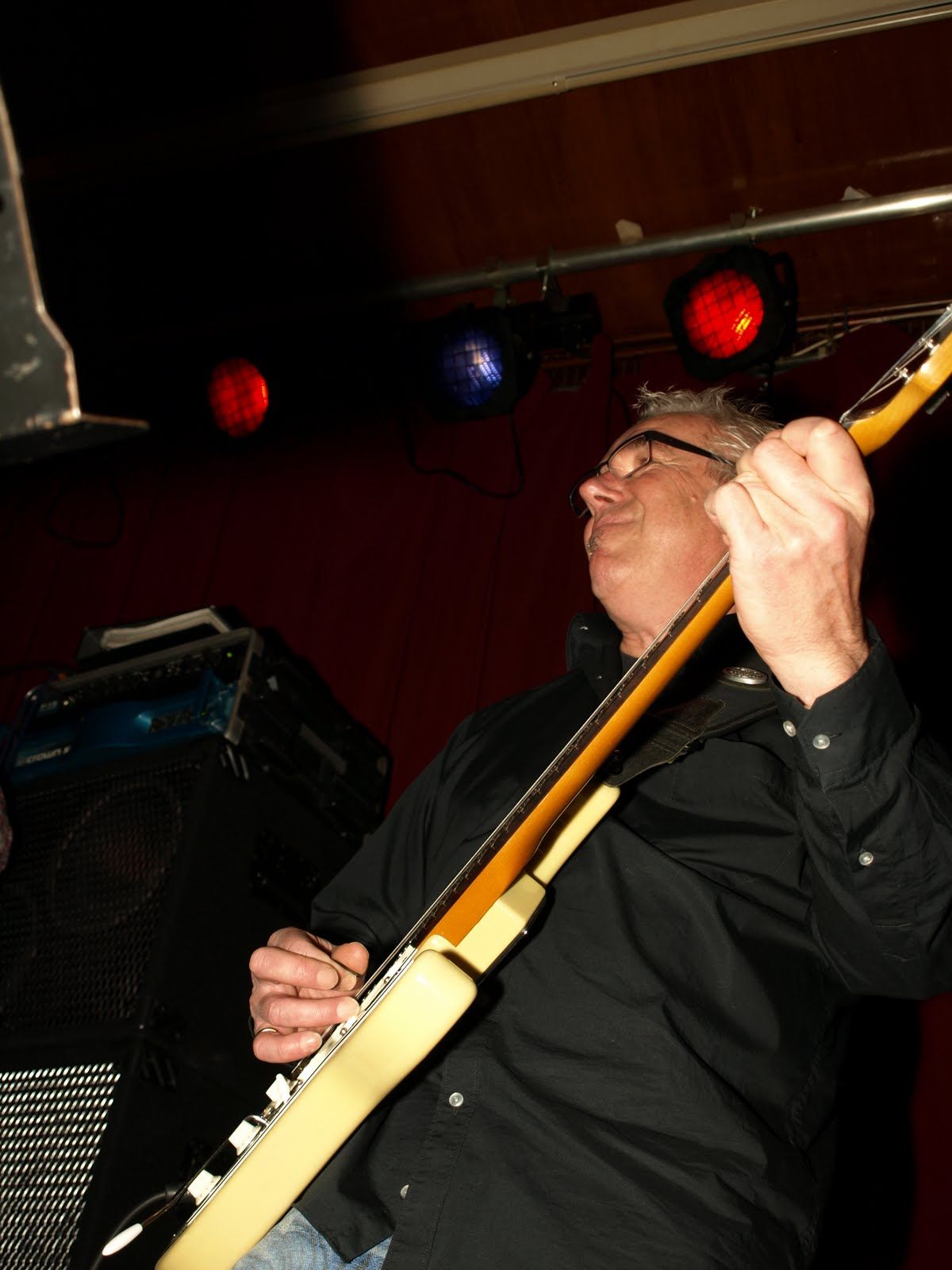
- Leo van de Ketterij (2011)

Background information
- Born: 14 November 1950; Netherlands
- Died: 5 July 2021 (aged 70) Zeeland, Netherlands
- Genres: Nederbeat
- Occupations: Musician, songwriter
- Years active: 1970-2021
- Formerly of: Shocking Blue

Leo van de Ketterij (14 November 1950 – 5 July 2021) was a Dutch guitarist mostly known for his work in Shocking Blue in the early 1970s.

== Career ==
From the age of fifteen he played in various regional bands. From 1970 to 1971 he was a member of Shocking Blue, turning the group from a four-piece group to a five-piece group. The band from the Netherlands city of The Hague had a world hit at that time with Venus, that had been released the year before. Ketterij continued to record in Zeeland, Netherlands. Leo wrote the song "My heart can't handle that", that was performed by Soy Kroon, Dennis Weening and Thomas Cammaert.

He later played with groups such as L & C Band and Minisink Townhosue. Ketterij was married to Dutch singer Cindy Tamo. She died in 2002. Ketterij died of pancreatic cancer on 5 July 2021, aged 70. He was diagnosed with the illness in August 2020.

He also was the father of Jesse van de Ketterij of Pep & Rash.
