= Scorpio's Dance =

Studio album by Shocking Blue
- Released: September 1970
- Recorded: 1970
- Studios: Sound Push (Blaricum); Bell Sound (New York City)
- Genres: Rock, country, Americana
- Length: 33:53 (Original); 45:38 (Reissues)
- Label: Pink Elephant
- Producer: Shocking Blue

Shocking Blue chronology
At Home (1969)	Scorpio's Dance (1970)	Third Album (1971)

Singles from Scorpio's Dance
- 1. "Sally Was a Good Old Girl" b/w "Long and Lonesome Road" Released: 1970

Professional ratings
Review scores
Source	Rating
Allmusic	4/5 stars

Scorpio's Dance is the third album by the rock band Shocking Blue. It was released in 1970 on Pink Elephant Records. The album was released in Japan under the title Sally Was a Good Old Girl.

This album continues the band's exploration into country music and Americana with tracks like "Alaska Country" and "Sally Was a Good Old Girl". It still stays true to its rock roots as well. Despite continuing their growth as a band, the album did not fare so well in America.

Since the album's reissue in 1990 it featured the singles "Send Me a Postcard", "Mighty Joe" and "Hello Darkness", the latter with B-side, as bonus tracks both on CD and LP.

== Track listing ==
All tracks are written by Robbie van Leeuwen except for "Sally Was a Good Old Girl", which was composed by Hank Cochran.

Side one
No.	Title	Length
1.	"Scorpio's Dance (First Movement)"	0:38
2.	"Alaska Country"	3:51
3.	"Sally Was a Good Old Girl"	3:26
4.	"Daemon Lover"	6:01
5.	"Scorpio's Dance"	3:41

Side two
No.	Title	Length
6.	"Little Cooling Planet"	3:59
7.	"I Love Voodoo Music"	4:00
8.	"Seven is a Number in Magic"	2:56
9.	"Keep It if You Want It"	2:51
10.	"Water Boy"	2:30

Bonus tracks on reissue editions
No.	Title	Length
11.	"Send Me a Postcard"	2:39
12.	"Mighty Joe"	3:12
13.	"Hello Darkness"	2:52
14.	"Pickin' Tomatoes"	3:19

== Personnel ==
Shocking Blue

- Mariska Veres - vocals
- Robbie van Leeuwen - guitar, sitar, backing vocals
- Cor van der Beek - drums
- Klaasje van der Wal - bass guitar

== Charts ==
Chart (1970)	Peak position
Dutch Albums (Album Top 100)	10
