= Don Pablo's Animals =

Italian dance music production group

- Origin: Italy
- Genres: Eurodance
- Years active: 1989–98
- Past members: Paolo Bisiach; Christian Hornbostel; Mauro Ferrucci

Don Pablo's Animals was an Italian production trio who had a top ten hit on the UK Singles Chart in 1990.

== History ==
The name was an alias of the BHF Team, the name being the initials of the producers involved (Paolo Bisiach, Christian Hornbostel, and Mauro Ferrucci) who also formed part of JT and the Big Family. In May 1990, the trio remixed the Shocking Blue song "Venus", titled "Venus '90", which featured a hip house rhythm and samples. "Venus '90" reached number 78 on the UK Singles Chart and number 49 on the Australian ARIA singles chart.

The trio also released a version (on Rumour Records) with the vocals taken off, but changed the credit from Shocking Blue to Don Pablo's Animals, and the record became a much bigger hit in Britain, peaking at number 4 on the UK Singles Chart, and number 40 on the German singles chart. The success led to the trio appearing on Top of the Pops. The follow-up single, a version of "Long Train Running" missed the chart, as did all other singles released under the name.
