= Do Not Disturb (Bananarama song) =

Single by Bananarama

from the album True Confessions
- B-side: "Ghost"
- Released: 12 August 1985 (UK)
- Recorded: April 1985
- Genre: Pop
- Length: 3:25
- Label: London Records
- Songwriter: Jolley & Swain
- Producers: Jolley & Swain

Bananarama singles chronology
"The Wild Life" (1984)	"Do Not Disturb" (1985)	"Venus" (1986)

"Do Not Disturb" is a song recorded by the English girl group Bananarama. It was written and produced by the production duo of Steve Jolley and Tony Swain. Originally released as a stand-alone single in 1985, the track was later added to Bananarama's third album True Confessions, which was issued by London Records a year later. "Do Not Disturb" was released in the UK, Australia, Germany, and Japan but only charted in the UK.

Bananarama didn't like the song. Group member Keren Woodward later said of the True Confessions album, "It is all our ideas, it is what we wanted to sound like and sing about. Except 'Do Not Disturb' which Swain and Jolley wrote and which we don't think is very good. That's why there are eleven songs on the LP instead of ten". When released, "Do Not Disturb" was a mid-charting single, peaking at number thirty-one.

The single was also issued as three separate shaped picture discs. Each disc featured a member of the group, accompanied by a plinth to display them upon.

== Music video ==
The music video for "Do Not Disturb", directed by Simon Milne, features Bananarama arriving at a hotel clad, all dressed in white dresses and blouses similar to the single's picture sleeve. The hotel's interior decor, including doorways and beds, transforms from a square-shaped to a round theme. These scenes are intercut with the group members performing the song in black-and-white outfits, and doing football tricks with superimposed circular footage. When the group members leave the hotel, the circular decor reverts to its original square-themed interior.

== Track listings ==
UK 7" vinyl single

London Records NANA 9

1. "Do Not Disturb" 3:23
2. "Ghost" 4:03
  P. Bishop/P. Seymour/S. Dallin

+ Some versions of the 7 inch were released in 3 different shaped picture disc singles format NANPD 9

UK 12" vinyl single

London Records NANX 9

1. "Do Not Disturb" (12" Version) 6:08
2. "Do Not Disturb" (Instrumental) 3:43
3. "Ghost" 4:03

2nd UK 12" vinyl single

London Records NANAM 9

1. "Do Not Disturb" (12" Version) 6:08
2. "Ghost" 4:03
3. "Do Not Disturb" (Bananamix) 10:50 +

+ A megamix featuring 6 of their earlier hits

== Charts ==
Chart (1985)	Peak position
Irish Singles Chart	22
UK Singles Chart	31
