= More Than Physical =

Single by Bananarama

from the album True Confessions
- B-side: "Scarlett"
- Released: 4 August 1986
- Recorded: March 1986
- Genre: Dance-pop
- Length: 5:05
- Label: London
- Songwriters: Mike Stock; Matt Aitken; Pete Waterman; Sara Dallin; Siobhan Fahey; Keren Woodward
- Producer: Stock Aitken Waterman

Bananarama singles chronology
"Venus" (1986)	"More Than Physical" (1986)	"A Trick of the Night" (1987)

Music video
- "More Than Physical" on YouTube

"More Than Physical" is a song by the English girl group Bananarama from their third studio album, True Confessions (1986). It was released on 4 August 1986 as the album's third single. It was co-written and produced by the Stock Aitken Waterman (SAW) trio. A reworked version of the song was released as the single version.

== Background and writing ==
In order to capitalize on the number-one success of previous single "Venus" (the other True Confessions track produced by SAW), "More Than Physical" was given a hi-NRG-influenced makeover with a sound similar to their previous dance-oriented chart-topper. "More Than Physical" marked the beginning of Bananarama's successful songwriting relationship with Stock Aitken Waterman. Speaking of the sometimes-fractious dynamic in the studio, producer Mike Stock said he found it difficult to write with the band, explaining he was obliged to collaborate with them due to a deal with their management.

"It's very difficult to be creative if someone's just going to mock you, or laugh at you", he said. "With Bananarama it was just awkward, all the time very awkward, and I didn't feel comfortable writing with them."

== Music video and uses ==
The remixed single version's music video, directed by Peter Care, further developed Bananarama's new glamorous and sexy style. The video included shots of several topless, muscled men intercut with footage of the group members. Some shots used coloured filters, and are juxtaposed with tightly cropped shots of body parts or movements in slow motion. One of the models in the video is Keren Woodward's then-boyfriend, David-Scott Evans.

"More Than Physical" was featured prominently in the 1987 British film Rita, Sue and Bob Too starring Michelle Holmes and Siobhan Finneran. The song is featured in the scene where the girls are babysitting for Bob and Michelle, and they dance around the living room while the video to "More Than Physical" plays on the television.

== Critical reception ==
Simon Mills of Smash Hits considered the song as a "jolly, bouncy pop" record, adding that it was "real modern because it's got lots of electronic bits" and "the lyrics turn everything upside down by making the female the dominant one".

== Chart performance ==
Despite heavy exposure on MTV, "More Than Physical" did not duplicate the success of "Venus", reaching number 41 on the UK Singles Chart and number 73 on the US Billboard Hot 100. Elsewhere, it peaked at number 25 in Ireland, number 28 in Australia, and number 38 in Germany. In the United States, "More Than Physical" reached number five on the US Hot Dance Club Play chart.

== Track listings ==
- UK, US, Canadian and Australian 7-inch single
1. "More Than Physical" 3:18
2. "Scarlett" 4:11
- 2nd UK 7-inch single doublepack
1. "More Than Physical" – 3:18
2. "Scarlett" – 4:11
3. "Venus" – 3:38
4. "White Train" – 3:50
- UK 7-inch picture disc
1. "More Than Physical" (Worldwide Single Version) – 3:20
2. "Venus" (Original Version) – 3:38
3. "Scarlett" – 4:11

The Original Version of "Venus" is a differently mixed version from the standard 7″ version.

- UK 12-inch single
1. "More Than Physical" (Garage Mix) – 8:45
2. "More Than Physical" (Dub) – 4:58
3. "Scarlett" (Extended Version) – 5:20
- UK 12-inch single (The Essential Ian Levine Dance Pack)
1. "More Than Physical" (Musclebound Mix) – 10:00
2. "Venus" (The Hellfire Mix) – 9:20
3. "Scarlett" – 4:11
- US 12-inch single
1. "More Than Physical" (Garage Mix) – 8:45
2. "More Than Physical" (Dub) – 4:58
3. "More Than Physical" (7″ Mix) – 3:18
- Luke Mornay Jet Set '26 Mix single
1. "More Than Physical" (Luke Mornay Jet Set '26 Edit) – 3:30
2. "More Than Physical" (Luke Mornay Jet Set '26 Mix) – 5:29
3. "More Than Physical" – 5:03
- The Alias Mixes single
1. "More Than Physical" (The Alias Deep Down '26 Edit) - 3:34
2. "More Than Physical" (The Alias Deep Down '26 Mix) - 5:20
3. "More Than Physical" – 5:03

== Charts ==
Weekly chart performance for "More Than Physical"
Chart (1986)	Peak position
Australia (Kent Music Report)	28
Europe (European Hot 100 Singles)	99
Europe (European Airplay Top 50)	47
Ireland (IRMA)	25
Quebec (ADISQ)	26
UK Singles (Official Charts)	41
US Billboard Hot 100	73
US Dance Club Songs (Billboard)	5
US Dance Singles Sales (Billboard)	26
US Cash Box Top 100	72
West Germany (GfK)	38
