= Send Me a Postcard =

Single by Shocking Blue
- A-side: "Send Me a Postcard"
- B-side: "Harley Davidson" (1968); "Long and Lonesome Road" (1969)
- Released: 1968
- Genre: Psychedelic rock; acid rock
- Songwriter: Robbie van Leeuwen
- Producer: Robbie van Leeuwen

"Send Me a Postcard" is a song written by Robbie van Leeuwen, and recorded by Shocking Blue in 1968.

With lyrics in Swedish by Per Gessle, the song was recorded in 1980 by Gyllene Tider, as "Skicka ett vykort, älskling". Finnish version of the song "Kirjoita postikorttiin" was recorded by Muska as her debut single in 1971 and first hit song. A Turkish version of the song "Aşk Çiçeği" (Flower of Love) was released by the band Mavi Işıklar in 1971. "Send Me a Postcard" was covered by Loog on their 1995 album Meltdown House, but was generally unknown in the US until Ladytron's Softcore Jukebox compilation was released in 2003. In 2014, it was re-released as a 7" single for Record Store Day. Bob Mould covered the song for his 2019 album Sunshine Rock.

Dutch singer-songwriter Jett Rebel remade the song as the title song for the 2017 film Love Revisited. "Send Me a Postcard" was included in the soundtrack of the television series Hanna, in the Season 1 episode titled "Friend", first aired on 29 March 2019.

== Charts ==
Chart (1968)	Peak position
Netherlands (Megacharts)	10
Norway (VG-lista)	4
