= How Can We Hang On to a Dream =

Song by Tim Hardin

from the album Tim Hardin 1
- B-side: "It'll Never Happen Again"
- Released: February 1966
- Genre: Folk
- Label: Verve Folkways
- Composer: Tim Hardin
- Producer: Erik Jacobsen

"How Can We Hang On to a Dream" is a song composed and recorded by Tim Hardin. It was Hardin's first single after he signed with Verve Folkways, released around six months before his debut album Tim Hardin 1. The single was titled "Hang On to a Dream" in some territories.

The song has been successfully covered by many artists, including charting versions by Johnny Hallyday, Rudy Bennett and Cliff Richard. Hardin's own version reached No. 50 on the UK Singles Chart. In the Netherlands, where the Dutch Top 40 chart aggregated Hardin's version with a cover by the Dutch singer Rudy Bennett as one entry, the song reached No. 4 in 1987.

== Charts ==
Chart (1967–87)	Peak position
Belgium (Ultratop 50 Flanders)	13
Netherlands (Dutch Top 40)	4
Netherlands (Single Top 100)	8
UK Singles (OCC)	50

== Covers ==
Many covers of the song have been recorded by prominent artists of the age, including a 1969 psychedelic rock recording by the short-lived band Gandalf. A cover version with a choral arrangement by Duncan Browne was recorded by The Nice, as "Hang On to a Dream", on their third album, Nice, Ian & Sylvia also as "Hang On to a Dream" on their album Long Long Time, and Nazareth on Snakes 'n' Ladders (1989). A closer cover version was performed by Fleetwood Mac on a 1969 BBC recording, released on Live at the BBC in 2001. Emerson, Lake & Palmer covered it on The Return of the Manticore. The Lemonheads released a cover of the track as a bonus addition to online editions of their 2009 covers album Varshons. Life of Riley: The Lightning Seeds Collection includes a cover version of the song. The Moody Blues with Denny Laine recorded two complete versions of the song (on April 5, 1969, and July 5, 1969). Both versions remained unissued until the late 2014 UK Esoteric 2-CD boxset of The Magnificent Moodies. Kathryn Williams recorded a cover version on her album Relations. The English Romo band Orlando contributed a cover version to the Fever Pitch E.P. which was released to accompany the soundtrack.

The Dutch singer Rudy Bennett had a hit with the song in 1967, reaching No. 5 on the Dutch charts. Johnny Hallyday recorded a French version in London in 1967, as "Je m'accroche à mon rêve", with French lyrics by Georges Aber. This version reached No. 4 on the Belgian Walloon chart. Françoise Hardy recorded the song for her album En Anglais under the title "Hang On to a Dream".

* 2003 - John Greene, A Different Game

== Popular usage ==
Hardin's version appeared on the soundtracks to the 1997 British film Fever Pitch and the 2000 German film The State I Am In. It was also used in the 1987 Dutch film Zoeken naar Eileen which led to the song's reappearance on the Dutch chart.
