= Venus (Shocking Blue song) =

1969 single by Shocking Blue

- One of artworks for the original Dutch single

Single by Shocking Blue
- B-side: "Hot Sand"
- Released: 14 July 1969
- Studio: Soundpush (Blaricum, Netherlands)
- Genre: Country rock; psychedelic rock; pop rock
- Length: 3:08
- Label: Pink Elephant
- Songwriter: Robbie van Leeuwen
- Producer: Shocking Blue

Shocking Blue singles chronology
"Lucy Brown Is Back in Town" (1968)	"Venus" (1969)	"Mighty Joe" (1969)

Music video
- "Venus" on YouTube

Audio
- "Venus" on YouTube

"Venus" is a song by Dutch rock band Shocking Blue, released as a single in the Netherlands in the summer of 1969. Written by Robbie van Leeuwen, the song topped the charts in nine countries, including the Billboard Hot 100 singles chart for the week ending February 7, 1970.

The song has been covered dozens of times by many artists. In 1986, English girl group Bananarama covered "Venus" for their third studio album, True Confessions, with the single reaching number one in six countries. The composition has been featured in numerous films, television shows, and commercials.

== Composition and recording ==
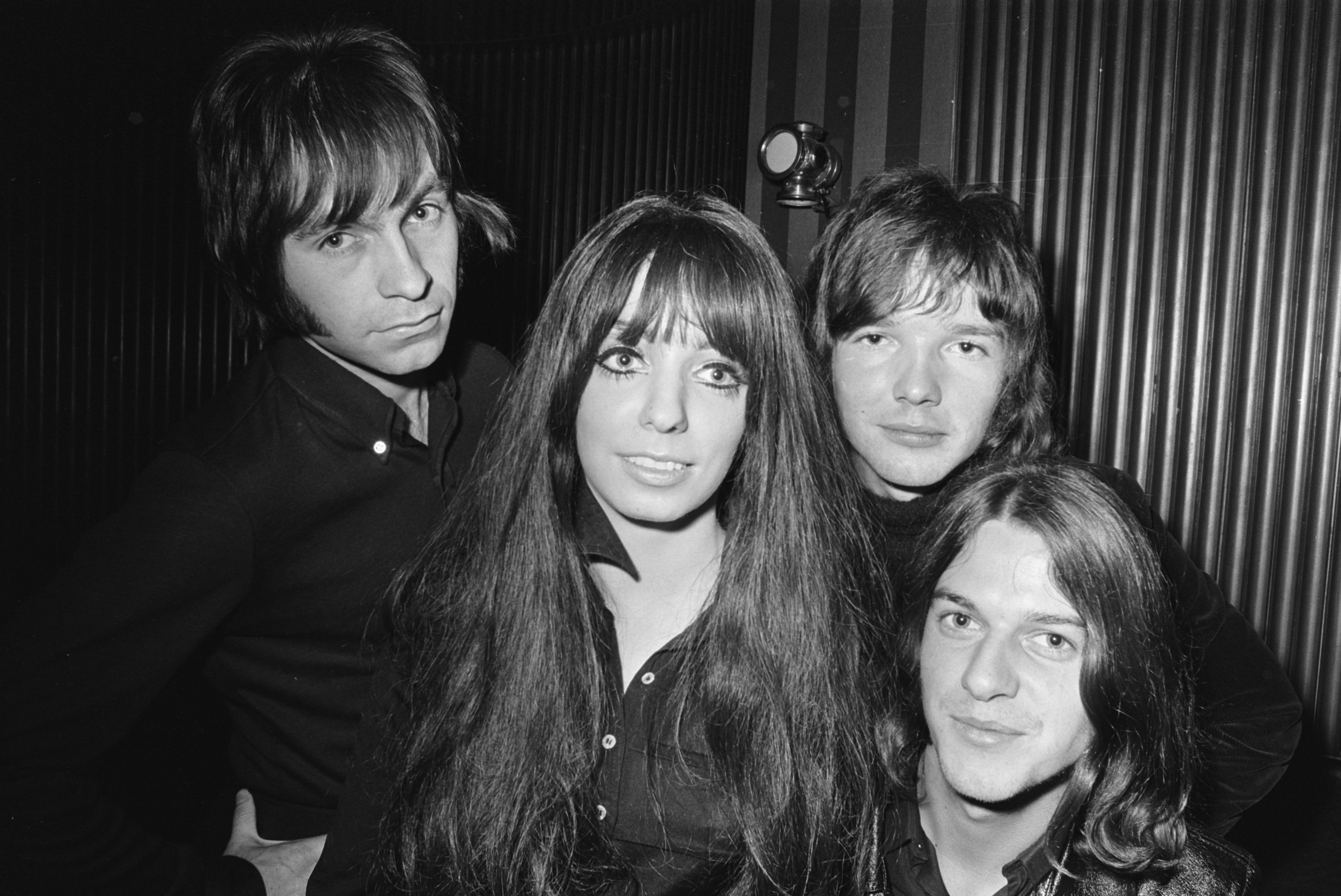
Shocking Blue in 1970

The song was written by Robbie van Leeuwen, Shocking Blue's guitarist, sitarist, and background vocalist. Van Leeuwen wrote new lyrics set to music based on "The Banjo Song" by Tim Rose and the Big 3, which is in turn lyrically a modification of the 19th century song "Oh! Susanna" by Stephen Foster. Influences from other songs include the opening guitar riff that is similar to The Who's "Pinball Wizard".

The song was recorded on a two-track machine in Soundpush Studio in Blaricum, the Netherlands. Van Leeuwen also produced the song.

The lead vocals were performed by Mariska Veres. The written lyrics, however, contained a typo in the line, "A goddess on a mountain top", with "goddess" written as "godness", which was how Veres, who was at the time not fluent in English, sang it on the record and on television. Later recordings by other artists corrected the error.

== Release and reception ==
"Venus" was issued in the Netherlands on 14 July 1969 as a single, backed with "Hot Sand", on the Pink Elephant label, a label specially created for Shocking Blue by Dureco. The song peaked at number three on the Dutch Top 40 on 12 July 1969, and remained at that position for a total of five weeks. It also reached No. 1 in Belgium, France, and Germany.

Jerry Ross, who was in Europe in the autumn of 1969 looking for European hits for release in the United States, was offered the song. He signed Shocking Blue to his newly created Colossus Records, and chose the record for release in the United States on 2 October 1969. "Venus" reached number one on the Billboard Hot 100 on 7 February 1970, the first song by a Dutch band to reach No. 1 on that chart. On 28 January 1970, it was certified gold by the Recording Industry Association of America (RIAA) for sales in excess of one million copies in the United States. Its success in the United States prompted further interest in other markets around the world in 1970, and it reached No. 3 again in the Netherlands, as well as the top 10 in the UK. It was No. 1 in Canada for 2 weeks. The popularity of the song also spurred interests in other Dutch groups. Worldwide, the single has sold over 5 million copies.

In 1981, it was used to open the "Stars on 45" medley. "Venus" was included as a bonus track on the 1989 CD reissue of Shocking Blue's second studio album, At Home, originally released in 1969.

Stereogum said, "It's so clean and propulsive: that strum, that dinky organ riff, the Teutonic sneer in Veres' voice. Veres snarls hard enough that it ultimately doesn't matter whether or not she has any idea what she's singing. The yelp on the hook — 'She’s got it! Yeah, baby, she’s got it!' — means nothing, but it sticks in your head all the same. The song works like a hook-delivery machine."

== Personnel ==
=== Shocking Blue ===
- Mariska Veres - lead vocals
- Robbie van Leeuwen - guitar, sitar, backing vocals
- Klaasje van der Wal - bass guitar
- Cor van der Beek - drums

=== Production ===
- Robbie van Leeuwen - songwriter
- Shocking Blue - producer

== Charts ==
=== Weekly charts ===
Weekly chart performance for "Venus"
Chart (1969–1970)	Peak position
Australia (Kent Music Report)	1
Austria (Ö3 Austria Top 40)	2
Belgium (Ultratop 50 Flanders)	1
Belgium (Ultratop 50 Wallonia)	1
Brazil (IBOPE)	1
Canada Top Singles (RPM)	1
Denmark (IFPI)	11
Finland (Suomen virallinen lista)	4
France (IFOP)	1
Ireland (IRMA)	10
Italy (Discografia Internazionale)	1
Italy (Musica e dischi)	1
Japan (Oricon Singles Chart)	2
Japan International (Oricon)	1
Malaysia (Radio Malaysia)	2
Mexico (Radio Mil)	2
Netherlands (Dutch Top 40)	3
Netherlands (Single Top 100)	2
New Zealand (Listener)	1
Norway (VG-lista)	2
Rhodesia (Lyons Maid)	3
Singapore (Radio Singapore)	1
South Africa (Springbok Radio)	1
Spain (AFYVE)	1
Sweden (Kvällstoppen)	1
Switzerland (Schweizer Hitparade)	1
UK Singles (Official Charts)	8
US Billboard Hot 100	1
US Cash Box Top 100	1
US 100 Top Pops (Record World)	1
West Germany (GfK)	2

=== Year-end charts ===
Year-end chart performance for "Venus"
Chart (1970)	Position
Australia (Kent Music Report)	19
Austria (Ö3 Austria Top 40)	8
Canada Top Singles (RPM)	17
Netherlands (Dutch Top 40)	31
Netherlands (Single Top 100)	28
South Africa (Springbok Radio)	7
US Billboard Hot 100	33
US Cash Box Top 100	6
West Germany (Official German Charts)	23

=== Certifications and sales ===
Region	Certification	Certified units/sales
Australia (ARIA)	Gold	35,000^{^}
France	—	400,000
Germany	—	350,000
Italy	—	350,000
Japan	—	550,000
Spain	—	150,000
United States (RIAA)	Gold	2,000,000
Summaries
Worldwide	—	5,000,000
^{^} Shipments figures based on certification alone.

== Bananarama version ==
"Venus"

Single by Bananarama

from the album True Confessions
- B-side: "White Train"
- Released: 19 May 1986
- Recorded: December 1985
- Studio: Odyssey (London)
- Genre: Dance-pop: synth-pop; hi-NRG
- Length: 3:50 (album version); 3:30 (single version); 7:23 (extended version)
- Label: London
- Songwriter: Robbie van Leeuwen
- Producer: Stock Aitken Waterman

Bananarama singles chronology
"Do Not Disturb" (1985)	"Venus" (1986)	"More Than Physical" (1986)

Music video
- "Venus" on YouTube

=== Background ===
"Venus" had been a part of Bananarama's repertoire for several years before they actually recorded it. The group's three members, Sara Dallin, Siobhan Fahey and Keren Woodward, had the idea of turning the song into a dance tune, but they were met with resistance from their producers at the time, Steven Jolley and Tony Swain. The group brought the idea to the production trio of Stock Aitken Waterman, and it became Bananarama's first collaboration with them.

The group had nearly completed recording their third studio album, True Confessions, with Jolley & Swain. Stock, Aitken and Waterman also resisted the idea because they believed that "Venus" would not make a good dance record. After persistence by the group, SAW relented. The track was initially produced in an arrangement more faithful to the Shocking Blue original, but was reworked in hi-NRG style after Fahey suggested that their version should sound similar to Dead or Alive's "You Spin Me Round (Like a Record)".

The collaboration on "Venus" led Bananarama and SAW to work together on the group's follow-up album, Wow!, the following year. A new mix of the song appeared as the B-side to the 1989 limited release "Megarama '89" in Germany and France. Bananarama has since re-recorded "Venus" for their eighth album Exotica (2001). It was later remixed by Marc Almond, with re-recorded vocals and included on their ninth album Drama (2005).

=== Critical reception ===
==== Initial response ====
Jerry Smith of the Music Week magazine considered Bananarama's cover as a "lively version" of the original song, "catchy enough for minor success" but "lacking substance" with its SAW production. Michael Pilgrim of Record Mirror was not enthusiastic, wondering why the Bananaramas needed to record another song, describing it like this: "There's beefy DOA-style hi-NRG electronics, the odd male vocal and at one point the girls go 'Wooaarrlll!'". In a review published in Smash Hits, Martin Degville and Neal X of Sigue Sigue Sputnik criticized this cover version, saying about Bananarama that "they've destroyed it" and "They're completely boring and they've got boring hair".

==== Impact and legacy ====
In 2014, Matt Dunn of WhatCulture ranked the song number five in his "15 unforgettable Stock Aitken Waterman singles" list, describing it as a "timeless classic of 80s synth pop, an instantly recognisable foot-tapping gem", while underlining the "provocative video and all its fire, sexy choreography, coffin dancing and red patent-leather devil outfits". In 2021, British magazine Classic Pop ranked "Venus" number two in their list of "Top 40 Stock Aitken Waterman songs". In 2023, Tom Eames of Smooth Radio ranked the song number two in his "Bananarama's 10 greatest songs, ranked" list. In 2025, Classic Pop ranked it number 10 in their list of "Top 20 Cover Versions of the 80s". The same year, Thomas Edward of Smooth Radio ranked the song sixth in his list of "Stock Aitken Waterman's 15 greatest songs, ranked".

=== Chart performance ===
Bananarama's version of "Venus" peaked at number one in the United States, Australia, Finland, New Zealand, South Africa, and Switzerland, while reaching number two in Germany and the top-ten in Austria, Belgium, Canada, France, Italy, the Netherlands, Norway, Sweden and the United Kingdom (number eight on the UK Singles Chart, matching the same peak of Shocking Blue's version). It also topped the US Dance Club Songs chart for two weeks.

=== Music video ===
The accompanying music video, directed by Peter Care and choreographed by Bruno Tonioli, was extensively aired on MTV and video channels across the world, and presented the trio in various costumes, including a she-devil, a French temptress, a vampiress and several Greek goddesses. In one sequence of the video, Sandro Botticelli's painting The Birth of Venus is adapted as a tableau vivant. The video marked a pivotal shift towards a more glamorous and sexual image for the group that contrasted with the tomboyish style of their earlier work. In the music video there's a cameo of the Polish-German dancer Andreas Wisniewski, who appears as a dancer during the synth solo.

=== Track listings ===
- UK / US / Canadian 7-inch vinyl single

UK: London Records NANA 10 / US: London Records 886-056-7 / Canada: London Records LDS 227 / Australia: Liberation Records LS 1789

1. "Venus" – 3:30
2. "White Train" – 3:50
  S.Dallin/S. Fahey/K. Woodward/P. Bishop/P. Seymour

+ some copies released in picture disc format NANPD 10

- UK / Australian 12-inch vinyl single

UK: London Records NANX 10 / Australia: Liberation Records LMD 474

1. "Venus" (extended version) – 7:23
2. "Venus" (dub) – 8:15
3. "White Train" – 3:50
- UK 12-inch vinyl single #2

London Records NANXR 10

1. "Venus" (the Hellfire mix) – 9:20 #:remixed by Ian Levine
2. "Venus" (Hellfire dub) – 6:55
3. "White Train" – 3:50
- UK 12-inch vinyl single #3

London Records NAXRR 10

1. "Venus" (the Fire And Brimstone mix) – 6:35 #:remixed by Stock, Aitken & Waterman
2. "Venus" (Hellfire dub) – 6:55
3. "White Train" – 3:50
- US 12-inch maxi single

London Records 886 088-1

1. "Venus" (the Hellfire mix) – 9:20
2. "Venus" (the Fire & Brimstone mix) – 6:55
3. "Venus" (extended version) – 7:23
4. "Venus" (dub) – 8:25
- CD video single
1. "Venus" (extended version) – 7:23
2. "True Confessions" (edit) – 4:09
3. "A Trick of the Night" (edit) – 4:07
4. "More Than Physical" (U.K. single version) – 3:40
- Richard X's Burning Flame '26 Mix single
1. "Venus" (Richard X's Burning Flame '26 Edit) - 3:33
2. "Venus" (Richard X's Burning Flame '26 Mix) - 5:38
3. "Venus" - 3:49
- Other versions
1. "Venus" (the Greatest Remix edit) – 3:40
  Included on the 1989 U.K. CD single "Cruel Summer '89", remixed by Phil Harding and Ian Curnow
2. "Venus" (the Greatest Remix) 7:43
  Included on the 1989 German CD single "Megarama '89", remixed by Phil Harding and Ian Curnow
3. "Venus" (2001 version)
  Included on the album Exotica
4. "Venus" (Marc Almond's Hi-NRG Showgirls mix) 6:02
  Included on the 2005 album Drama, remixed by Marc Almond
5. "Venus" (from the soundtrack Sugar & Spice: Stuck in the 80's)
6. "Venus" (Leo Zero Remix)
  Included on the EP Bananarama Remixed: Vol 1
7. Venus (Leo Zero Disco Remix)
  Included on the EP Bananarama Remixed: Vol 1
8. "Venus" (Boys Noize Remix edit)
9. "Venus" (Boys Noize Remix)
10. "Venus" (Boys Noize Remix - Instrumental)
11. "Venus" (Richard X’s Burning Flame '26 Mix)
12. "Venus" (Richard X’s Burning Flame '26 Edit)

=== Personnel ===
Personnel are adapted from the liner notes of True Confessions.

- Stock Aitken Waterman – production, Linn 9000 programming (credited as "A. Lin")
- Matt Aitken – guitar
- Mike Stock – keyboards
- Garry Hughes – keyboards
- Tim Young – mastering

=== Charts ===
==== Weekly charts ====
Weekly chart performance for "Venus"
Chart (1986)	Peak position
Australia (Kent Music Report)	1
Austria (Ö3 Austria Top 40)	7
Belgium (Ultratop 50 Flanders)	6
Belgium (Ultratop 50 Wallonia)	3
Canada Retail Singles (The Record)	1
Canada Top Singles (RPM)	4
Denmark (IFPI)	14
Europe (European Hot 100 Singles)	3
Europe (European Airplay Top 50)	2
Finland (Suomen virallinen lista)	1
France (SNEP)	4
Ireland (IRMA)	12
Israel (IBA)	4
Italy (Musica e dischi)	3
Japan (Oricon Singles Chart)	43
Luxembourg (Radio Luxembourg)	5
Netherlands (Dutch Top 40)	4
Netherlands (Single Top 100)	5
New Zealand (Recorded Music NZ)	1
Norway (VG-lista)	4
Quebec (ADISQ)	1
South Africa (Springbok Radio)	1
Spain (AFYVE)	14
Sweden (Sverigetopplistan)	9
Switzerland (Schweizer Hitparade)	1
UK Singles (Official Charts)	8
US Billboard Hot 100	1
US Adult Contemporary (Billboard)	29
US Dance Club Songs (Billboard)	1
US Dance Singles Sales (Billboard)	1
US Cash Box Top 100	3
Venezuela (UPI)	10
West Germany (GfK)	2
Zimbabwe (ZIMA)	13

==== Year-end charts ====
Year-end chart performance for "Venus"
Chart (1986)	Position
Australia (Kent Music Report)	4
Belgium (Ultratop 50 Flanders)	53
Canada Top Singles (RPM)	43
Europe (European Hot 100 Singles)	8
Netherlands (Dutch Top 40)	64
Netherlands (Single Top 100)	63
New Zealand (RIANZ)	6
South Africa (Springbok Radio)	20
Switzerland (Schweizer Hitparade)	5
UK Singles (OCC)	72
US Billboard Hot 100	38
US 12-inch Singles Sales (Billboard)	6
US Dance/Disco Club Play (Billboard)	21
US Cash Box Top 100	43
West Germany (Media Control)	10

1985–1989 chart performance for "Venus"
Chart (1985–1989)	Position
Europe (European Hot 100 Singles)	41

=== Certifications ===
Certifications for "Venus"
Region	Certification	Certified units/sales
Canada (Music Canada)	Platinum	100,000^{^}
France (SNEP)	Silver	250,000^{*}
United Kingdom (BPI)	Silver	200,000^{‡}
^{*} Sales figures based on certification alone.^{^} Shipments figures based on certification alone.^{‡} Sales+streaming figures based on certification alone.

== BHF/Don Pablo's Animals remixes ==
"Venus" was remixed and re-released by dance producers The BHF (Bisiach Hornbostel Ferrucci) Team in May 1990. Titled "Venus '90", the remix featured a hip house rhythm and samples. "Venus '90" reached number 78 on the UK Singles Chart and number 49 on the Australian ARIA Singles Chart. An instrumental version was also released independently under the producer's alias, Don Pablo's Animals, without referencing Shocking Blue. The instrumental version became the highest-charting version of the song, peaking at number four on the UK Singles Chart.

== Other versions ==
Tom Jones recorded the song in 1970 on his album Tom.

Cadillac recorded the song in 1984 on his album Funkyllac.

Japanese singer Yōko Oginome covered the song in 1986, and peaked No.10 in Oricon Singles Chart.

Dutch DJ Pieter Gabriel remixed the song for the opening ceremony of the Grand Final of The Eurovision Song Contest 2021 held in Rotterdam in the Netherlands. The remix was used as a backdrop for the 26 finalists being introduced onto the stage in a flag ceremony.

== Popular media ==
Shocking Blue's "Venus" was featured in the sixth episode of the 2020 Netflix miniseries The Queen's Gambit. The protagonist Beth (played by Anya Taylor-Joy) dances and sings to the music video. The scene takes place in 1967, well before the song was released in 1969.

Bananarama's cover of "Venus" was featured in the 2011 video game Just Dance 3.

The song has been used in commercials for Gillette Venus Women's Razor since c. 2001.

In 2023, the song appeared as part of the soundtrack of the comedy-drama film The Holdovers.

The original version (Shocking Blue) was featured in the closing of the 2026 french film The Electric Kiss (La Vénus électrique)

== See also ==
- List of 1970s one-hit wonders in the United States
