= Shocking Blue =

Dutch rock band

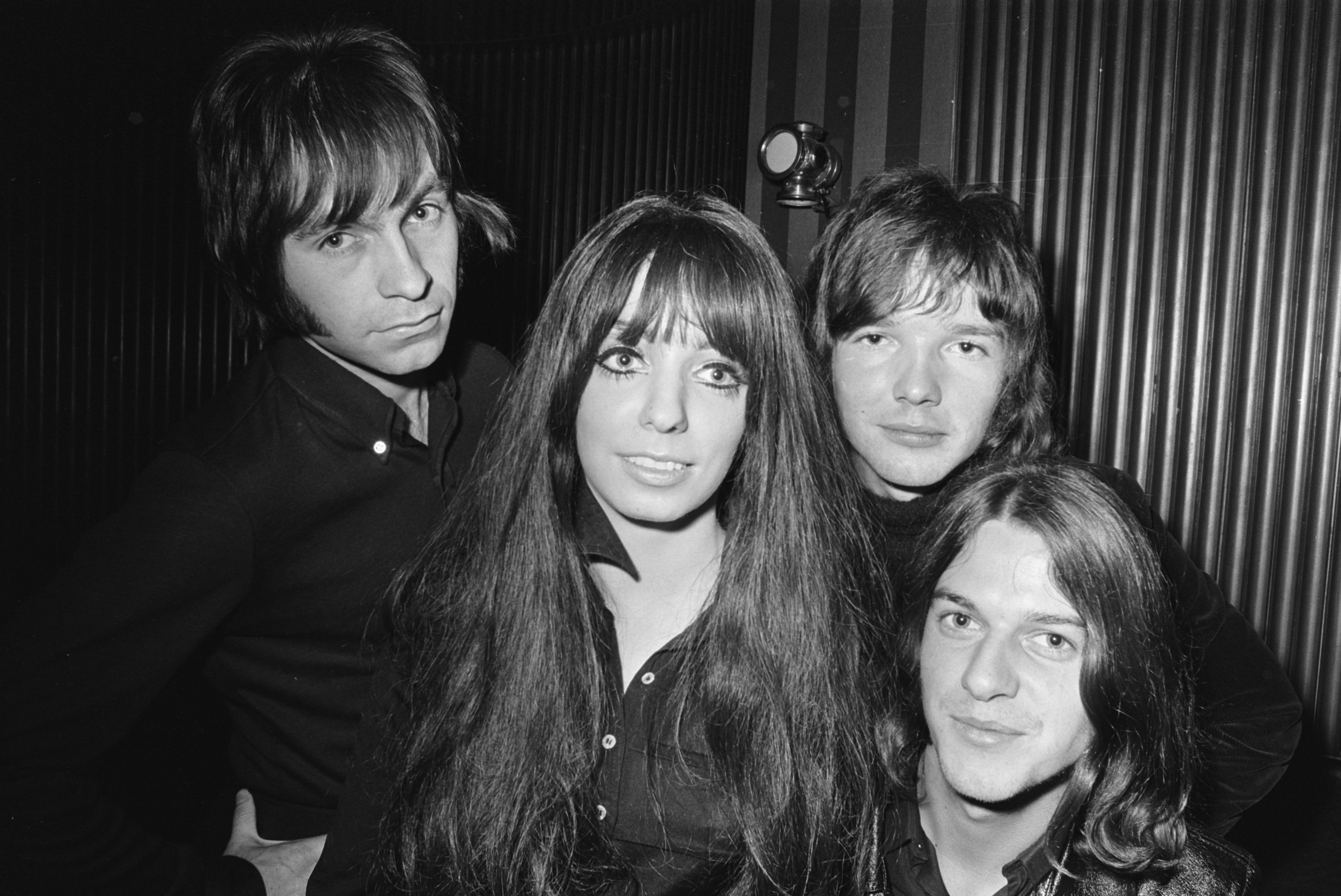
- Shocking Blue in 1970

Background information
- Origin: The Hague, Netherlands
- Genres: Psychedelic rock; Nederbeat; garage pop
- Years active: 1967–1974 (reunions: 1979, 1980, 1984)
- Labels: Pink Elephant; Polydor; Phonogram; Polygram; Universal; Mercury; Penny Farthing; Colossus
- Past members: Mariska Veres; Robbie van Leeuwen; Fred de Wilde; Klaasje van der Wal; Cor van der Beek; Leo van de Ketterij; Martin van Wijk; Henk Smitskamp

Shocking Blue was a Dutch rock band formed in The Hague in 1967. They were part of the Nederbeat movement in the Netherlands. The band had a string of hit songs during the counterculture movement of the 1960s and early 1970s, including "Send Me a Postcard" and "Venus", which became their biggest hit and reached number one on the U.S. Billboard Hot 100 and in many other countries during 1969 and 1970. The band sold 13 million records by 1973 but disbanded in 1974. Together with Golden Earring and the George Baker Selection, they are considered the most successful Nederbeat band, because their best hits charted abroad and especially in the United States.

== History ==
=== Original era ===
Shocking Blue was founded in 1967 by the Motions guitarist Robbie van Leeuwen. Other members of the group at this time were Fred de Wilde, Klaasje van der Wal (1 February 1949 – 12 February 2018) and Cor van der Beek (9 June 1949 – 2 April 1998). They had a minor hit in 1968 with "Lucy Brown is Back in Town". When De Wilde was the band's lead singer, the band originally had a sound that was described as a cross between the Beatles and Brothers Four.

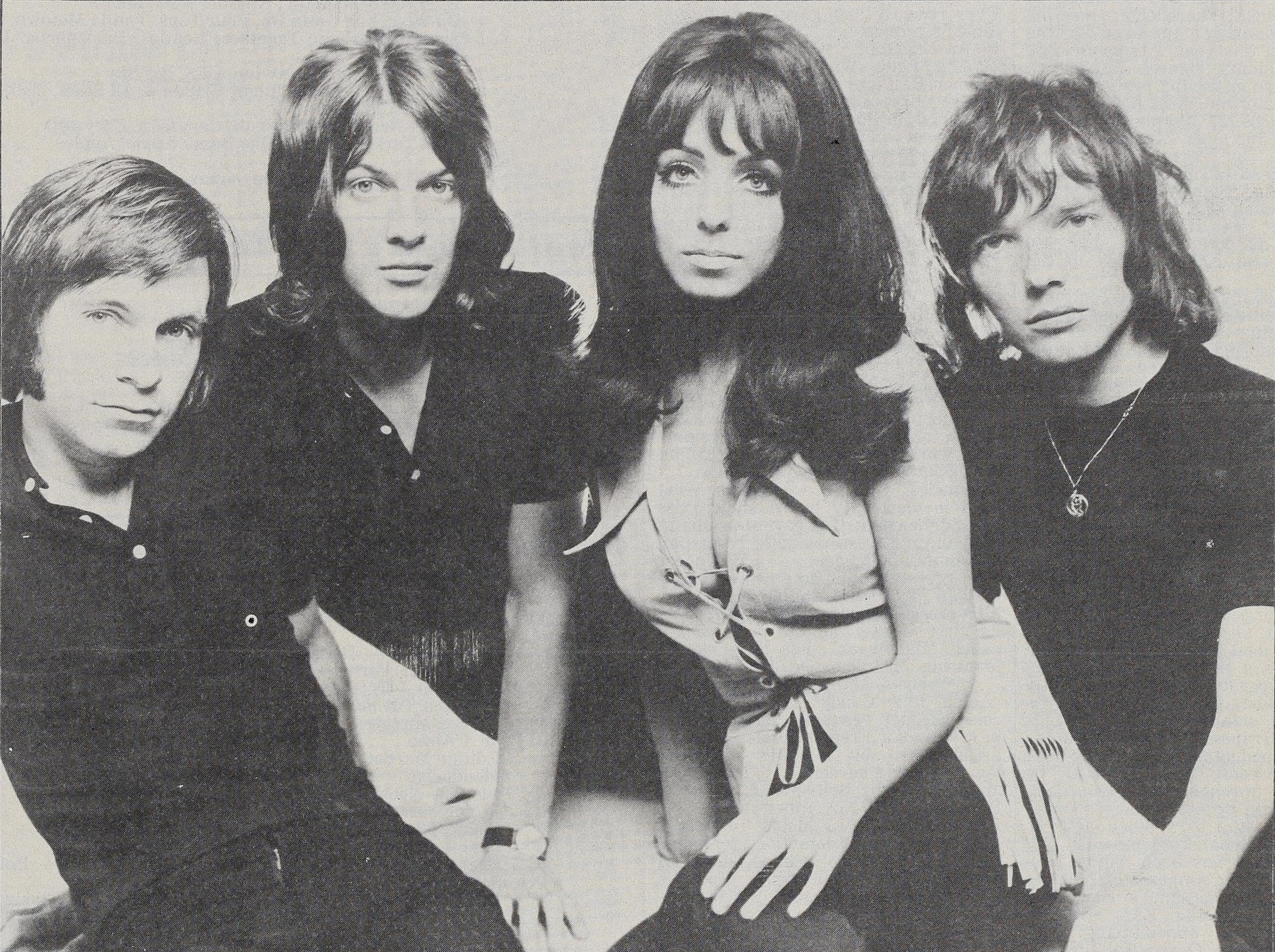
Shocking Blue on the cover of Cash Box; 22 November 1969

De Wilde left in 1968 after joining the Dutch army, and van Leeuwen was introduced to Mariska Veres, singing at that time with a club band. He persuaded her to take over the vocals, and the group recorded a worldwide hit with the song "Venus", which entered the Veronica top 40 hit parade at position No.12 the 12 July 1969 and peaked at number three on 26 July 1969 in the Netherlands. The song was released in the United States and the United Kingdom at the end of the year and reached number one on the Billboard Hot 100 in February 1970. It subsequently sold 350,000 copies in Germany and topped the U.S. chart for three weeks, the first song from the Netherlands to do so. It sold over one million copies there by January 1970 and received a gold record awarded by the Recording Industry Association of America. Global sales exceeded five million copies. Other hits include "Send Me a Postcard" in late 1968 and "Long and Lonesome Road" (often mistakenly named as "Long Lonesome Road") in 1969.

"Venus" was followed by "Mighty Joe" (flip-side "Wild Wind") in 1969 and "Never Marry a Railroad Man" (flip-side "Roll Engine Roll") in 1970, both of which sold over a million records. The latter became a top-ten hit in several countries around the world. Later songs were successful in Europe, Latin America, and Asia, including "Hello Darkness", "Demon Lover" (1970), "Shocking You", "Blossom Lady" and "Out of Sight, Out of Mind" (1971), "Inkpot", "Rock in the Sea" and "Eve and the Apple" (1972) and "Oh Lord" (1973), but they failed to make the charts in the U.S. or U.K.

Klaasje van der Wal left towards the end of 1971, following their first trip to Japan (which spawned a live album). In 1974, Robbie Van Leeuwen quit, and Mariska Veres left later that year, leading to the band's split. Veres went on to pursue a solo career until 1982.

=== Reunions ===
Shocking Blue reformed with its most famous line-up in 1979 and recorded "Louise" as their first single since their break-up in 1974. The song was never released. They did, however, perform live in 1980 with earlier songs such as "Venus" and "Never Marry a Railroad Man".

The band attempted another comeback in 1984 and released a new single "The Jury and the Judge" with "I Am Hanging on to Love" as the B-side in 1986.

In 1994, the single "Body and Soul" was released.

=== Legacy ===
Drummer Cor van der Beek died on 2 April 1998 at age 49 in Rotterdam, Netherlands. Mariska Veres died of gallbladder cancer on 2 December 2006 at age 59 in The Hague, Netherlands. Bassist Klaasje van der Wal died on 12 February 2018 at age 69.

Bananarama covered "Venus" in 1986, hitting number 1 in the United States, Canada, and Australia, and reaching number 8 in the UK.

Nirvana covered "Love Buzz" as their debut single in 1988 and later included it on their first album Bleach in 1989.

== Members ==
=== Principal members ===
- Cor van der Beek – drums, percussion (1967–1974; died 1998)
- Robbie van Leeuwen – guitars, sitar, mandolin, backing vocals (1967–1973)
- Klaasje van der Wal – bass guitar (1967–1971; died 2018)
- Mariska Veres – lead vocals (1968–1974; died 2006)

=== Other members ===
- Fred de Wilde – lead vocals, guitars (1967–1968)
- Leo van de Ketterij – guitars (1970–1971; died 2021)
- Martin van Wijk – guitars (1973–1974)
- Henk Smitskamp – bass guitar (1972–1974)

== Discography ==
=== Albums ===
==== Studio albums ====
- Shocking Blue (also known as Beat with Us, German version) (1967)
- At Home (also known as The Shocking Blue, 1970 American version) (1969)
- Scorpio's Dance (also known as Sally Was a Good Old Girl, Japanese title) (1970)
- Third Album (also known as Shocking You) (1971)
- Inkpot (1972)
- Attila (also known as Rock in the Sea, Japanese title, and Eve and the Apple) (1972)
- Ham (1973)
- Dream on Dreamer (1974)
- Good Times (1974)

==== Live albums ====
- Live in Japan (Recorded on July 28 and 30, 1971, at Tokyo Kōsei Nenkin Kaikan) (1971)

==== Compilation albums ====
Charted or certified compilation albums

Title	Album details	Peak chart positions
Title	Album details	NED
The Golden Years of Dutch Pop Music	Released: 2015; Label: Universal	39

Other compilation albums

- 1969 Sensational Shocking Blue (Discofoon)
- 1970 Shocking Blue (Pink Elephant)
- 1971 Hello Darkness (Pink Elephant)
- 1972 The Shocking Blue, Perfect Collection (Polydor)
- 1972 The Best of Shocking Blue (Pink Elephant)
- 1973 Shocking Blue's Best (Metronome)
- 1973 With Love from... Shocking Blue (Capri)
- 1978 The Shocking Blue Double Deluxe (Polydor)
- 1980 Venus (Piccadilly)
- 1981 The Shocking Blue Greatest Hits (CNR)
- 1986 Best of Shocking Blue (CNR)
- 1986 Classics (21 Records)
- 1986 The Best of Shocking Blue (Victor)
- 1990 The Very Best of Shocking Blue (Red Bullet), (Arcade, 1993)
- 1990 Shocking Blue 20 Greatest Hits (Repertoire)
- 1990 Venus (Castle Communications AG)
- 1994 A Portrait of Shocking Blue (Castle)
- 1995 The Golden Hits (Red Bullet)
- 1997 Singles A's and B's (Repertoire)
- 1997 Shocking Blue Grand Collection (A.R.O.)
- 1998 Shocking You (Laserlight)
- 2000 Shocking Blue Golden Collection 2000 (Lighthouse)
- 2000 All Gold of the World Shocking Blue (Mekkophone & Castle Communications)
- 2004 Shocking Blue Greatest Hits (Red Bullet)
- 2011 The Very Best of Shocking Blue (Part One - The A Sides) (Red Bullet)
- 2011 The Very Best of Shocking Blue (Part Two - The B Sides) (Red Bullet)
- 2022 At Home (The Singles) (Music on Vinyl; RSD limited edition 10" pink vinyl)

=== Box sets ===
Title	Album details	Peak chart positions
Title	Album details	NED
The Blue Box	Released: 2017; Label: Red Bullet	83

=== Singles ===
Year	Single	Peak chart positions											Certifications	Album
Year	Single	NED	NED	AUS	AUT	BEL	CAN	GER	NOR	SWI	UK	US	Certifications	Album
1967	"Love Is in the Air"	—	—	—	—	—	—	—	—	—	—	—		Shocking Blue
1968	"Lucy Brown Is Back in Town"	—	21	—	—	—	—	—	—	—	—	—		Non-album single
1968	"Send Me a Postcard"	10	11	—	—	—	—	—	4	—	—	—		Non-album single
1969	"Long and Lonesome Road"	16	17	—	—	—	72	—	—	—	—	75		Non-album single
1969	"Venus"	2 (Note: "Venus" originally peaked at No. 3 during the first chart run in 1969.The song re-entered the charts the following year, peaking at No. 2. The 1980 reissue did not appear in the Dutch Top 50 charts but spent 3 weeks in the unnumbered Single Tip charts.)	3	1	2	1	1	2	2	1	8	1	RIAA: Gold	At Home (international version & reissues)
1969	"Mighty Joe"	2	1	43	16	3	22	5	—	6	43	43		Non-album single
1970	"Never Marry a Railroad Man"	1	1	40	15	1	—	12	5	6	—	102*		Non-album single
1970	"Sally Was a Good Old Girl"	—	—	—	—	—	—	—	—	—	—	—		Scorpio's Dance
1970	"Hello Darkness"	4	6	—	—	14	—	44	—	—	—	—		Non-album single
1970	"Love Buzz"	—	—	—	—	—	—	—	—	—	—	—		
1970	"Harley Davidson"	—	—	—	—	—	—	—	—	—	—	—		
1971	"Shocking You"	10	12	—	—	29	—	45	—	—	—	—		Third Album
1971	"Serenade"	—	—	—	—	—	—	—	—	—	—	110		Third Album
1971	"Blossom Lady"	2	2	78	—	4	—	41	—	—	—	—		Non-album single
1971	"Out of Sight, Out of Mind"	6	6	—	—	13	—	—	—	—	—	—		Non-album single
1971	"Daemon Lover"	—	—	—	—	—	—	—	—	—	—	—		
1971	"Bool Weevil"	—	—	—	—	—	—	—	—	—	—	—		
1972	"Inkpot"	5	5	97	—	4	—	12	—	—	—	—		Inkpot
1972	"Rock in the Sea"	14	12	—	—	23	—	31	—	—	—	—		Attila
1972	"Eve and the Apple"	15	13	—	—	19	—	—	—	—	—	—		Eve and the Apple
1972	"I’ll Follow The Sun"	—	—	—	—	—	—	—	—	—	—	—		
1972	"Jambalaya"	—	—	—	—	—	—	—	—	—	—	—		
1973	"Let Me Carry Your Bag"	—	— (Note: "Let Me Carry Your Bag" did not appear in the Dutch Top 40 charts but peaked at No. 10 in the Tipparade charts.)	—	—	—	—	—	—	—	—	—		Non-album single
1973	"Oh Lord"	14	14	—	—	15	—	—	—	—	—	—		Ham
1974	"This America"	—	— (Note: "This is America" did not appear in the Dutch Top 40 charts but peaked at No. 4 in the Tipparade charts.)	—	—	23	—	—	—	—	—	—		Non-album single
1974	"Dream on Dreamer"	—	—	—	—	—	—	—	—	—	—	—		Non-album single
1974	"Good Times"	—	—	—	—	—	—	—	—	—	—	—		Good Times
1974	"Beggin’"	—	—	—	—	—	—	—	—	—	—	—		
1975	"Gonna Sing My Song"	— (Note: "Gonna Sing My Song" did not appear in the Dutch Top 30 charts but peaked at No. 20 in the Single Tip charts.)	— (Note: "Gonna Sing My Song" did not appear in the Dutch Top 40 charts but peaked at No. 14 in the Tipparade charts.)	—	—	—	—	—	—	—	—	—		Non-album single
1986	"The Jury and the Judge"	—	—	—	—	—	—	—	—	—	—	—		Non-album single
1990	"Venus '90"	—	—	49	—	—	—	—	—	—	78	—		Non-album single
1994	"Body and Soul"	—	—	—	—	—	—	—	—	—	—	—		Non-album single
"—" denotes releases that did not chart or were not released in that territory.

=== Videos ===
- 2004 Greatest Hits Around the World (Red Bullet)

== See also ==
- List of one-hit wonders in the United States
