= Mariska Veres =

Dutch musician (1947–2006)

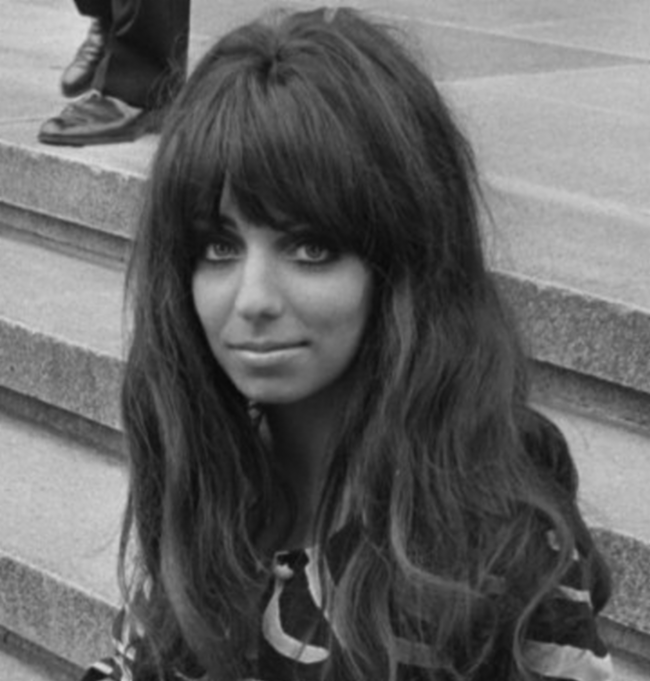
- Veres in 1970

Background information
- Born: Maria Elisabeth Ender; 1 October 1947; The Hague, Netherlands
- Died: 2 December 2006 (aged 59) The Hague, Netherlands
- Genres: Psychedelic rock; pop; jazz
- Occupation: Musician
- Instruments: Vocals; keyboards
- Years active: 1963–2006
- Formerly of: Shocking Blue; Les Mystères; The Bumble Bees; The Blue Fighters; Danny and his Favourites; General Four; The Motowns; The Shocking Jazz Quintet

Maria Elisabeth Ender, better known as Mariska Veres (1 October 1947 – 2 December 2006), was a Dutch musician with Hungarian Roma origins who was the lead vocalist of the rock group Shocking Blue. She was known for her sultry voice, eccentric performances, and her striking appearance which featured kohl-rimmed eyes, and high and long jet-black hair, which was actually a wig.

== Early life ==
Mariska Veres was born Maria Elisabeth Ender ('Mariska' is the Hungarian diminutive form of 'Maria'). in The Hague, in the Netherlands. Her father, Lajos Veres (1912–1981), was a Hungarian violinist of Roma descent. Her German-born mother, Maria Antonia Ender (1912–1986), was of French and Russian heritage. The elder Veres had emigrated to the Netherlands from Hungary in 1939, settling in Rotterdam. Several of his family members were killed in The Holocaust.

Mariska had two siblings, both of whom were also musicians, and Mariska began taking singing and piano lessons from an early age. She cited British pop singers Cliff Richard and Helen Shapiro as influences.

== Career ==
=== Early career (1963–1967) ===
Veres began her career as a singer in 1963 with the guitar band Les Mystères. In 1964 the band recorded an EP (GTB-label, 10 copies only) with Veres singing on side 1: "Summertime" (solo) and "Someone" (a duet). In 2010 the EP was re-released by record club Platenclub Utrecht (PLUT 009). In 1965, she sang with the Bumble Bees, and then with the Blue Fighters, Danny and his Favourites and General Four. Later in 1966 she sang with the Motowns with whom she also played organ.

=== Shocking Blue (1968–1992) ===
In 1968, she was invited to join Shocking Blue to replace lead singer Fred de Wilde, who had to join the army. In 1969/1970 Shocking Blue gained worldwide fame with the hit single "Venus". The month of their arrival in the United States gossip columnist Earl Wilson referred to Veres as a "beautiful busty girl'".

When Shocking Blue split up on 1 June 1974, Veres continued in a solo career. Her singles "Take Me High" (1975) and "Lovin' You" (1976) were popular mainly in the Netherlands, Belgium and Germany. She also released the singles "Tell It Like It Is" (1975), a cover version of Dusty Springfield's "Little By Little" (1976), and "Too Young" (1978).

Shocking Blue reunited in 1984. This comeback turned out to be successful, but one of the other original members, Robbie van Leeuwen, stepped back from the group, partly because he had moved to Luxembourg.

=== Late career (1993–2006) ===
Veres started the jazz group the Shocking Jazz Quintet in 1993, and recorded an album (Shocking You) with pop songs from the 1960s and 1970s, but in a jazz version. From 1993 to 2006 she performed in yet another reincarnation of Shocking Blue (who recorded the songs "Body and Soul" and "Angel", both produced by former member Robbie van Leeuwen), and also recorded an album with Andrei Serban in 2003, named Gipsy Heart, going back to her Romani roots.

A version of "Venus" was posthumously released in 2007, a few months after her death, recorded with pianist/bandleader Dolf de Vries (on the album Another Touch). Veres recorded "Venus" four times: with Shocking Blue (1969), with the Mariska Veres Shocking Jazz Quintet (1993), with Formula Diablo (in English/Spanish, 1997), and with Dolf de Vries (a lounge version of "Venus", 2005–2006).

== Personal life ==
Veres had a long-term relationship with guitarist André van Geldorp, but never married or had children. Reminiscing to the Belgian magazine Flair, she remarked about her early fame: "I was just a painted doll (back in those days), nobody could ever reach me. Nowadays, I am more open to people."

=== Death ===
Veres died of gallbladder cancer on December 2, 2006 at age 59, just three weeks after the disease had been detected.

== Discography ==
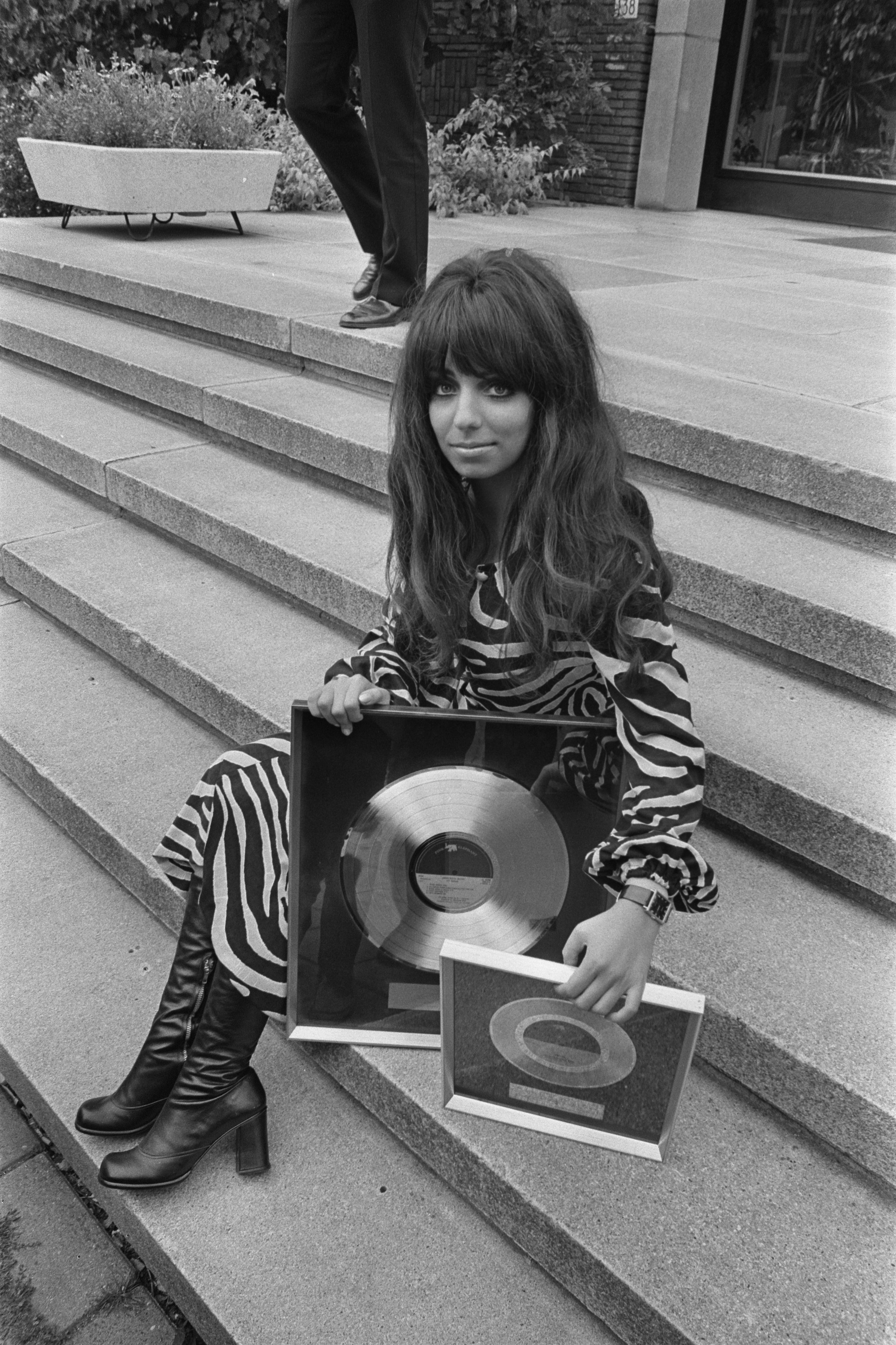
Veres in 1970 at the Hilton Amsterdam, having been presented with gold and platinum records by Albert Mol

=== Solo singles ===
- 1975 "Take Me High" / "I Am Loving You" (Pink Elephant, Polydor, Decca)
- 1976 "Tell It Like It Is" / "Wait Till' I Get Back to You" (Pink Elephant, Polydor)
- 1976 "Loving You" / "You Showed Me How" (Pink Elephant)
- 1977 "Little by Little" / "Help the Country" (Pink Elephant)
- 1978 "Too Young" / "You Don't Have to Know" (Seramble)
- 1978 "Bye Bye to Romance" / "It's a Long Hard Road" (CNR)
- 1980 "Looking Out for Number One" / "So Sad Without You" (CNR)
- 1982 "Wake Up City" / "In the Name of Love" (EMI Records)

=== Albums ===
- 1993 Shocking You (Red Bullet), album by Mariska Veres Shocking Jazz Quintet
- 2003 Gipsy Heart (Red Bullet), album by Mariska Veres & Ensemble Andrei Serban
