= Robbie van Leeuwen =

Dutch musician, songwriter (born 1944)

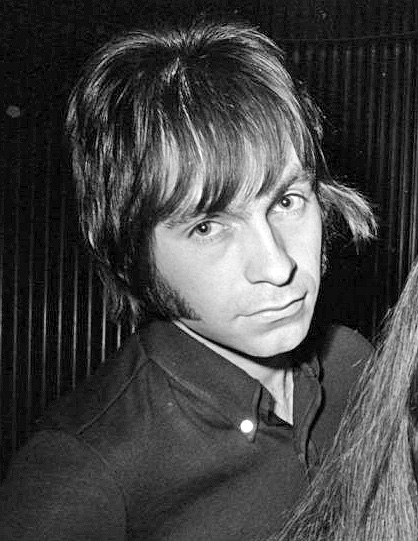
- Robbie van Leeuwen in 1970

Background information
- Born: 29 October 1944 (age 81); The Hague, Netherlands
- Genres: Rock and roll, rock, synth-pop
- Occupations: Musician, guitarist, songwriter
- Instruments: Guitar; sitar
- Years active: 1964-1994
- Formerly of: The Motions, Shocking Blue, Galaxy-Lin, Mistral

Robbie van Leeuwen (born 29 October 1944) is a Dutch musician who was a guitarist, sitarist, background vocalist and main songwriter for multiple Dutch bands, including The Motions and Shocking Blue, with whom he recorded the worldwide hit "Venus". In 1967, he played guitar on the only single ever released by "The Six Young Riders" titled "Let the Circle Be Unbroken". As of January 2023, he is the only surviving member of Shocking Blue's best known four-piece lineup.

== Career ==
Van Leeuwen formed The Motions in 1964 with Rudy Bennett, Henk Smitskamp, and Sieb Warner. They were the first Nederbeat band to achieve chart success, and had their first major selling single in 1965.

In 1967 he founded the band Shocking Blue, which had a No. 1 hit in 1969 with the single "Venus". His best-known compositions are Shocking Blue's most famous songs: "Venus", which was a US and UK No. 1 hit and was later covered by Bananarama and "Love Buzz", covered by Nirvana and released as their first single, and "Daemon Lover". In 1974 he left Shocking Blue and released the successful single "Long Hot Summer" with his new band Galaxy-Lin. He was the founder and main composer for this band which released two albums: "Galaxy Lin" in 1974 and "G" in 1975. The singer was Rudy Bennett, with whom van Leeuwen had already collaborated in another band, called The Motions. Galaxy-Lin disbanded in 1976.

Together with Rick van der Linden, Van Leeuwen founded Mistral in 1977. This group scored three hits during this period, "Jamie", "Starship 109" and "Neon City". The main instrument used was the synthesizer. The group produced three more singles in 1980, but these were not as successful as the previous singles. In 1984 he released two more singles under the name "Cat's Eye". Except for producing two singles for former Shocking Blue singer Mariska Veres, a 1977 song titled "Too Young" and a 1994 song titled "Body and Soul", Robbie van Leeuwen withdrew from the music business and moved to Luxembourg.

== Personal life ==
In 2013 he received the Buma Lifetime Achievement Award. As of 2018 he, again, lives in the Netherlands, in Wassenaar. In January 2019 he was interviewed on Dutch television during a broadcast of the daily talkshow 'De Wereld Draait Door' in connection with his 75th birthday in October of the same year. It was his first interview in years since Van Leeuwen is known to be very media-shy. Several bands played compositions by Van Leeuwen in 'De Wereld Draait Door' after this broadcast during the weeks that followed.

== Discography ==
=== The Motions ===
Albums

- 1965 - "Introduction to The Motions"
- 1966 - "Their Own Way"
- 1967 - "Motions Songbook"
- 1967 - "Impressions of Wonderful"
- 1968 - "The Motions Live!"
- 1969 - "Electric Baby"
- 1970 - "Sensation"

Extended plays

- 1965 - "I've Waited So Long" + "It's Gone" / "For Another Man" + "I've Got Misery"
- 1966 - "Wasted Words" + "I'll Follow the Sun" / "There's No Place to Hide" + "Everything That's Mine"
- 1966 - "Every Step I Take" + "Hard Time Blues" / "Stop Your Crying" + "Everything That's Mine"

Singles

- 1965 - "It's Gone" / "I've Got Misery"
- 1965 - "You Bother Me" / "We Fell in Love"
- 1965 - "For Another Man" / "I've Waited So Long"
- 1965 - "Love Won't Stop" / "No Matter Where You Run"
- 1965 - "Wasted Words" / "I'll Follow the Sun"
- 1966 - "Everything That's Mine" / "There's No Place to Hide"
- 1966 - "Why Don't You Take It?" / "My Love Is Growing"
- 1966 - "Every Step I Take" / "Stop Your Crying"
- 1966 - "It's the Same Old Song" / "Someday Child"
- 1967 - "I Want You, I Need You" / "Suzie Baby"
- 1967 - "Wonderful Impressions" / "Nellie the Horse"
- 1967 - "Tonight We'll Be Stoned" / "One Million Red Balloons"
- 1968 - "You're My Adee" / "Hey Conductor Man"
- 1968 - "Take Your Time" / "Make It Legal"
- 1968 - "Miracle Man" / "Something"
- 1968 - "I Ain't Got Time" / "Fantasy Club"
- 1968 - "Take the Fast Train" / "Hamburg City"
- 1969 - "It's Alright" / "Hey Everybody"
- 1969 - "Freedom" / "Little Boy's Life" + "What's Your Name"
- 1969 - "Eliza" / "Wedding of the Hundred Brides"
- 1969 - "I Can't Help It" / "Look Away"
- 1970 - "Try to Make You Happy" / "We All Come Together"

=== Shocking Blue ===
(see full discography at Shocking Blue)

=== Galaxy-Lin ===
Albums

- 1974 - "Galaxy-Lin"
- 1975 - "G"

Singles

- 1974 - "Travelling song" / "Utopia"
- 1975 - "Long hot summer" / "Utopia"
- 1975 - "Hunting song" / "Don't"
