= Shakespears Sister discography =

- Studio albums: 4
- Extended plays: 1
- Compilation albums: 5
- Singles: 17
- Music videos: 16

The discography of UK-based pop-rock act Shakespears Sister consists of four studio albums, five compilation albums, one EP, and seventeen singles. Originally a solo act consisting of ex-Bananarama member Siobhan Fahey, it eventually evolved into a duo between Fahey and Marcella Detroit. They released their debut studio album Sacred Heart in 1989, which reached number 9 on the UK Albums Chart and was certified gold by the BPI. The album's lead single, double A Side "Break My Heart / Heroine" did not chart, the second single however, "You're History", reached number 7 on the UK Singles Chart, and managed similar top 20 success internationally. Their next three singles, "Run Silent", "Dirty Mind", and "Goodbye Cruel World" (the lead single from their second album Hormonally Yours), all failed to peak within the UK top 50. The second single from Hormonally Yours, "Stay" was the group's first and only number 1, staying at the top position for 8 weeks. The song also reached number 1 in Ireland and Sweden, and peaked within the top 5 in several other territories. Hormonally Yours peaked at number 3 in the UK and was certified double platinum, and reached similar success in international territories. The fifth and final single from the album, "My 16th Apology", was not a commercial success due to both members being on hiatus at the time.

Detroit left the group shortly afterwards in 1993, and Fahey resumed as the sole full member of the group. "I Can Drive" was released as the lead single from Shakespears Sister's third album, #3, and peaked at number 30 in the UK. Following this, London Records opted not to release the third album and the act was dropped from their roster. #3 was only released in September 2004 through Fahey's own website after London Records gave her the full rights to the album. Fahey was planning to release her own solo album at the time, which was preceded by three singles, "Bitter Pill", "Pulsatron", and "Bad Blood", which peaked at numbers 108, 95, and failed to chart respectively. In 2004–05, two compilation albums were released, The Best of Shakespears Sister (composed mostly of hits and B-sides), and Long Live the Queens (composed entirely of B-sides, rarities, and unreleased material). Fahey revived the Shakespears Sister name in 2009, and released Songs from the Red Room, composed of her solo recordings. A compilation album, Cosmic Dancer, was released in 2011, also composed of Fahey's solo work, acoustic work by the wider group, and covers.

Following Fahey and Detroit's reunion in 2019, the band released a compilation album containing two new tracks, titled Singles Party, in July 2019, followed by a 5-track EP of new material, titled Ride Again. A UK tour followed later that year.

== Albums ==
=== Studio albums ===
Title	Album details	Peak chart positions										Certifications
Title	Album details	UK	AUS	AUT	CAN	GER	NOR	NZ	SWE	SWI	US	Certifications
Sacred Heart	Released: 16 August 1989; Formats: LP, CD, cassette; Label: FFRR	9	22	—	—	71	—	—	30	—	—	BPI: Gold; ARIA: Gold
Hormonally Yours	Released: 17 February 1992; Formats: LP, CD, cassette; Label: London	3	20	21	33	12	15	17	25	15	56	BPI: 2× Platinum; ARIA: Gold; BVMI: Gold; IFPI SWI: Gold
#3	Released: September 2004; Formats: CD, LP, digital download; Label: SF	—	—	—	—	—	—	—	—	—	—	
Songs from the Red Room	Released: 16 November 2009; Formats: LP, CD, digital download; Label: SF, Palare	—	—	—	—	—	—	—	—	—	—	

=== Compilation albums ===
Title	Album details	Peak chart positions
Title	Album details	UK
Best of Shakespear's Sister	Released: 22 November 2004; Formats: CD/DVD, digital download; Label: London	—
Long Live the Queens!	Released: 5 December 2005; Formats: CD; Label: London	—
Cosmic Dancer	Released: 29 October 2012; Formats: CD, Digital download; Label: SF	—
Remixes	Released: 29 October 2012; Formats: CD, digital download; Label: SF	—
Singles Party	Released: 19 July 2019; Formats: CD, digital download; Label: London	14

== Extended plays ==
Title	EP details	Peak chart positions
Title	EP details	UK
Ride Again	Released: 25 October 2019; Formats: Digital download, CD, vinyl; Label: London	67

== Singles ==
Title	Year	Peak chart positions										Certifications	Album
Title	Year	UK	AUS	AUT	GER	IRE	NED	NZ	SWE	SWI	US	Certifications	Album
"Break My Heart" / "Heroine"	1988	112	—	—	—	—	—	—	—	—	—		Sacred Heart
"You're History"	1989	7	20	—	55	12	51	28	8	—	—		Sacred Heart
"Run Silent"	1989	54	47	—	—	—	—	—	—	—	—		Sacred Heart
"Dirty Mind"	1990	71	65	—	—	—	—	—	—	—	—		Sacred Heart
"Goodbye Cruel World"	1991	59	—	—	—	—	—	—	—	—	—		Hormonally Yours
"Stay"	1992	1	3	4	3	1	28	5	1	2	4	BPI: Gold; ARIA: Gold; RIAA: Gold	Hormonally Yours
"I Don't Care"	1992	7	18	29	34	10	57	11	38	28	55		Hormonally Yours
"Goodbye Cruel World" (remix)	1992	32	—	—	—	—	—	—	—	—	—		Hormonally Yours
"Hello (Turn Your Radio On)"	1992	14	97	—	12	27	33	43	20	9	—		Hormonally Yours
"My 16th Apology"	1993	61	—	—	63	—	—	—	—	—	—		Hormonally Yours
"I Can Drive"	1996	30	—	—	—	—	—	—	—	—	—		#3
"Bitter Pill"^{[a]}	2002	108	—	—	—	—	—	—	—	—	—		Songs from the Red Room
"Pulsatron"^{[a]}	2005	95	—	—	—	—	—	—	—	—	—		Songs from the Red Room
"Bad Blood"^{[a]}	2005	—	—	—	—	—	—	—	—	—	—		Songs from the Red Room
"It's a Trip"	2010	—	—	—	—	—	—	—	—	—	—		Songs from the Red Room
"All the Queen's Horses"	2019	—	—	—	—	—	—	—	—	—	—		Singles Party
"When She Finds You"	2019	—	—	—	—	—	—	—	—	—	—		Ride Again
"—" denotes a recording that did not chart or was not released in that territory.

=== Promotional singles ===
Title	Year	Album
"Black Sky"	1992	Hormonally Yours
"Cold"^{[a]}	2004	Songs from the Red Room
"Dancing Barefoot"	2011	Cosmic Dancer
"Someone Else's Girl"	2011	Cosmic Dancer
"Really Saying Something"	2011	—N/a
"Do I Scare You?" (with Billy Mackenzie)	2011	#3
"A Christmas Number One"	2014	The MGA Sessions

== Music videos ==
Title	Year	Director(s)
"Break My Heart (You Really)"	1988	Sophie Muller
"Heroine"	1988	Sophie Muller
"You're History"	1989	Sophie Muller
"Run Silent"	1989	Sophie Muller
"Dirty Mind"	1990	The Craze Boys
"Goodbye Cruel World"	1991	Sophie Muller
"Stay"	1992	Sophie Muller
"I Don't Care"	1992	Sophie Muller
"Hello (Turn Your Radio On)"	1992	Sophie Muller
"My 16th Apology"	1993	Sophie Muller
"I Can Drive"	1996	Sophie Muller
"Pulsatron"	2005	Morten Magnus
"Bad Blood"	2005	Morten Magnus; Christian Isak Isaksan
"It's a Trip"	2010	Paul Boyd
"All the Queen's Horses"	2019	Sophie Muller
"When She Finds You"	2019	Sophie Muller

=== Other videos ===
Title	Year	Director(s)
"Sacred Heart"	1989	Beyond the Groove
"Catwoman"	1992	Sophie Muller
"Pulsatron" (Live Video Mix)	2005	Caroline Richards
"Bad Blood" (Edit)	2005	Morten Magnus; Christian Isak Isaksan
"It's a Trip" (Live Video Mix)	2009	Caroline Richards
"Someone Else's Girl"	2011	Morten Magnus; Kim Jakobsen

== Home videos ==
Title	Album details
Sacred Heart	Released: 1989; Formats: VHS; Label: FFRR
Hormonally Yours	Released: 1992; Formats: VHS; Label: London
S.F.T.R.R: Videos	Released: 11 April 2010; Formats: DVD; Label: SF

== Notes ==
a These singles were released under Fahey's own name. Since their inclusion on Songs from the Red Room, they have been credited as Shakespears Sister songs.
