= Singles Party =

Compilation album by Shakespears Sister
- Released: 19 July 2019
- Recorded: 1988–2019
- Label: London
- Producer: Siobhan Fahey; Marcella Detroit

Shakespears Sister chronology
The Other Side... Demos and Rarities Part III (2013)	Singles Party (2019)	Ride Again (2019)

Singles Party (1988–2019) is a compilation album from British-American pop-rock group Shakespears Sister, released on 19 July 2019. It features a remastered collection of all the singles released by the group and two new songs. The deluxe edition containing a second CD with remixes, rarities and previously unreleased material accompanied by a 48-page booklet with photos, new sleeve notes and lyrics was also released the same day.

The compilation coincided with the announcement of Siobhan Fahey and Marcella Detroit's reunion for the first time in 26 years.

In order to promote the tour and the compilation, a new single titled "All the Queen's Horses" was released on 15 May 2019.

== Track listing ==
Standard edition / Deluxe edition disc one
No.	Title	Writer(s)	Length
1.	"Break My Heart" (Remastered)	Siobhan Fahey; Richard Feldman; Marcella Detroit	3:31
2.	"Heroine" (Remastered)	Fahey; Feldman	3:27
3.	"You're History" (Remastered)	Fahey; Detroit; Feldman; Patrick Seymour	4:29
4.	"Run Silent" (Remastered - Restructured 7” Mix)	Fahey; Detroit; Feldman	3:41
5.	"Dirty Mind" (Remastered - 1990 Version)	Fahey; Detroit; Feldman	4:11
6.	"Stay" (Remastered - Radio Mix)	Fahey; Detroit; David A. Stewart	3:47
7.	"I Don't Care" (Remastered - 7” Remix)	Fahey; Detroit; Feldman; Edward Shearmur	4:25
8.	"Goodbye Cruel World" (Remastered - 1992 Remix)	Fahey; Manu Guiot; Steve Ferrera	4:00
9.	"Hello (Turn Your Radio On)" (Remastered - 7” Version)	Fahey; Detroit; Guiot	4:13
10.	"My 16th Apology" (Remastered - 7” Edit)	Fahey; Detroit; Feldman	3:47
11.	"I Can Drive" (Remastered)	Fahey; Robert Hodgens; Stewart	4:08
12.	"Bitter Pill" (Remastered - Radio Edit)	Fahey; Clare Kenny; Steven Gallifent; Will Blanchard	3:36
13.	"Pulsatron" (Remastered - Vocal Mix)	Fahey; Kenny; Gallifent; Blanchard	3:16
14.	"Bad Blood" (Remastered)	Fahey; Kenny; Gallifent; Blanchard	4:18
15.	"It's a Trip" (Remastered)	Fahey; Marco Pirroni; Gallifent	3:44
16.	"All The Queen's Horses" (Previously unreleased)	Fahey; Detroit	3:26
17.	"C U Next Tuesday" (Previously unreleased)	Fahey; Detroit	2:37
18.	"Stay" (Acoustic Version / Remastered)	Fahey; Detroit; Stewart	3:46

Deluxe edition disc two
No.	Title	Length
1.	"Cat Worship" (Previously unreleased outtake from Hormonally Yours)
2.	"You're History" (Catz 'n Dogz Remix (Exclusive new remix))
3.	"You Made Me Come to This" (HMD Pulsatron Mix (Exclusive new remix))
4.	"Pretty Boy" (Remastered (withdrawn B-Side to the Break My Heart single))
5.	"Mr Wrong" (Remastered (B-Side to the Run Silent single))
6.	"Remember My Name" (Remastered (B-Side to the I Don’t Care single))
7.	"Do I Scare You?" (Remastered (from the album #3))
8.	"Excuse Me John" (Remastered (from the album #3))
9.	"Singles Party" (Remastered (from the album #3))
10.	"Heroine" ((Heavenly Mix) / Remastered)
11.	"Black Sky" ((The Black Dub) / Remastered)
12.	"Break My Heart" ((Shep Pettibone Dub) / Remastered)
13.	"Goodbye Cruel World" ((BTO Remix) / Remastered)
14.	"You're History" ((Brothers in Rhythm Remix) / Remastered)

== Charts ==
Chart (2019)	Peak position
Scottish Albums (OCC)	7
UK Albums (OCC)	14
UK Independent Albums (OCC)	4
