= Shakespears Sister Ride Again =

2019 concert tour by Shakespears Sister

- Tour by Shakespears Sister
- Associated albums: Singles Party and Ride Again
- Start date: October 31, 2019
- End date: November 20, 2019
- Legs: 1
- No. of shows: 14 in United Kingdom

Shakespears Sister Ride Again was an all-UK concert tour by British-Irish/American rock act Shakespears Sister. The tour was announced as part of their reunion in May 2019. Prior to their reunion and the tour's announcement, band members Siobhan Fahey and Marcella Detroit hadn't spoken in twenty-seven years following a well publicised feud. The tour was announced in support of their compilation album Singles Party and their EP Ride Again. Consisting of 14 dates, Shakespears Sister Ride Again launched on October 31, 2019, in Nottingham and concluded on November 20, 2019, in Brighton.

== Background ==
Shakespears Sister initially parted in 1993, shortly after the release of their million-selling album Hormonally Yours and following tensions between Fahey and Detroit. Fahey intermittently revived the name Shakespears Sister as a solo act, releasing albums online. In May 2019, Fahey and Detroit announced that they would reunite on stage later in the year. A UK tour, titled Shakespears Sister Ride Again, was announced during the same month. A new single, All the Queen's Horses, was released on 15 May, with an accompanying music video. This was followed by the compilation album, Singles Party, in July 2019.

The duo performed "Stay" on The Graham Norton Show on 10 May 2019; their first TV performance together since 1993. They also announced that they were recording an EP of new material. The EP Ride Again was released on 25 October 2019, and was followed on the 31 October with the opening night of Shakespears Sister Ride Again.

== Setlist ==
The following setlist was obtained from the concert held on November 1, 2019, at the New Theatre Oxford. It may not represent all concerts for the duration of the tour.

1. "Intro" (contains elements of "Jaws", "Feud", "What Ever Happened To Baby Jane?", "Dollars Trilogy", "The Borgias", "Death Becomes Her", "Mommie Dearest" and "Sunset Boulevard")
2. "Goodbye Cruel World"
3. "Heroine" (contains elements of "Mommie Dearest" and "Joan Crawford")
4. "Dangerous Game"
5. "Dirty Mind"
6. "My 16th Apology"
7. "Heaven Is In Your Arms"
8. “The Trouble With Andre”
9. "Emotional Thing"
10. "C U Next Tuesday"
11. "Time To Say Goodbye"
12. "All The Queen's Horses"
13. "When She Finds You"
14. "Black Sky"
15. "Stay"
16. "Are We In Love Yet?"
17. "I Don't Care"
18. "You're History"

Encore

19. "Catwoman"
20. "Hello (Turn Your Radio On)"
