= Best of Shakespear's Sister =

The Best of Shakespear's Sister

Compilation album by Shakespears Sister
- Released: 22 November 2004
- Recorded: 1988–2004
- Genre: Rock, dance, pop, adult contemporary
- Label: London Records, Warner Bros. Records
- Producer: Siobhan Fahey, Marcella Detroit, Robert Feldman, David A. Stewart, Alan Moulder, Flood, Andy Wright

Shakespears Sister chronology
| #3 (2004) | The Best of Shakespear's Sister (2004) | Long Live the Queens! (2005) |

The Best of Shakespear's Sister is a compilation album from British pop-rock band Shakespears Sister, released in November 2004. The compilation consists of a CD of greatest hits, rarities, and unreleased tracks, and a DVD of their music videos and live performances. The album gained notability for its inclusion of several tracks from the then-unreleased album, #3, which was only finally released six months later after a near decade-long delay.

== Track listing ==
CD
| No. | Title | Writer(s) | Length |
|---|---|---|---|
| 1. | "You're History" | Siobhan Fahey, Marcella Detroit, Richard Feldman, Patrick Seymour | 4:29 |
| 2. | "Heroine" | Fahey, Feldman | 3:27 |
| 3. | "Break My Heart (You Really)" | Fahey, Detroit, Feldman | 3:31 |
| 4. | "Dirty Mind" | Fahey, Feldman | 4:08 |
| 5. | "Waiting" | Fahey, Barry Maguire | 3:36 |
| 6. | "Goodbye Cruel World" | Fahey, Dave Stewart, Steve Ferrera | 4:00 |
| 7. | "Stay" | Fahey, Detroit, Stewart | 3:47 |
| 8. | "I Don't Care" | Fahey, Detroit, Feldman, Edward Shearmur | 4:25 |
| 9. | "Hello (Turn Your Radio On)" | Fahey, Detroit, Stewart | 4:13 |
| 10. | "I Can Drive" | Fahey, Robert Hodgens, Stewart | 4:08 |
| 11. | "Excuse Me John" | Fahey, Hodgens | 4:44 |
| 12. | "Can U Wait That Long" | Fahey, Stewart | 4:15 |
| 13. | "Do I Scare You?" | Fahey, Hodgens | 5:03 |
| 14. | "White Rabbit" (Droyds Remix) | Grace Slick | 3:02 |
| 15. | "Was It Something I Said?" | Fahey, Sophie Muller | 4:53 |

DVD
| No. | Title | Length |
|---|---|---|
| 1. | "Break My Heart (You Really)" |
| 2. | "Heroine" |
| 3. | "Run Silent, Run Deep" |
| 4. | "You're History" |
| 5. | "Dirty Mind" |
| 6. | "The Russian Film" (featuring "Dirty Mind" and "Heroine" live in Leningrad, 1988) |
| 7. | "Goodbye Cruel World" |
| 8. | "Stay" |
| 9. | "I Don't Care" |
| 10. | "Catwoman" (Live) |
| 11. | "My 16th Apology" |
| 12. | "Hello (Turn Your Radio On)" |
| 13. | "I Can Drive" |
