= Long Live the Queens! =

Compilation album by Shakespears Sister
- Released: 5 December 2005
- Genre: Pop
- Length: 78:40
- Label: London Records
- Producers: Siobhan Fahey, Marcella Detroit, Robert Feldman, David A. Stewart, Alan Moulder, Flood, Andy Wright

Shakespears Sister chronology
The Best of Shakespear's Sister (2004)	Long Live the Queens! (2005)	Songs from the Red Room (2009)

Long Live the Queens! (a.k.a. The Platinum Collection) is the second compilation album by UK pop-rock project Shakespears Sister.

== Background ==
Long Live the Queens was released as part of Warner Bros. Records' Platinum Collection series, and thus is often referred to as such. As opposed to the greatest hits-oriented The Best of Shakespear's Sister, the album is compiled of rarities and unreleased tracks & mixes, many of which making their debut on CD. "Pretty Boy", for instance, was previously only released on a promotional 12" vinyl of "Break My Heart (You Really)".

== Track listing ==
No.	Title	Writer(s)	Length
1.	"You're History" (Maximized Version)	Siobhan Fahey, Richard Feldman, Marcella Detroit, Patrick Seymour	6:41
2.	"Pretty Boy"	Fahey, David A. Stewart, Detroit	3:40
3.	"Break My Heart (You Really)" (Extended Mix)	Fahey, Feldman, Detroit	5:38
4.	"Heroine" (Heavenly)	Fahey, Feldman	5:35
5.	"Run Silent, Run Deep" (The Revolution Mix)	Fahey, Feldman	6:33
6.	"Mr. Wrong"	Fahey, Stewart	3:53
7.	"Dirty Mind" (1990 Version)	Fahey, Feldman	4:11
8.	"Goodbye Cruel World" (BTO Mix)	Fahey, Stewart, Steve Ferrara	5:50
9.	"Black Sky" (The Black Widow Mix)	Fahey, Detroit, Ferrara, Stewart	6:00
10.	"I Don't Care" (Henley Board Mix)	Fahey, Detroit, Edward Shearmur, Feldman	4:06
11.	"Remember My Name"	Fahey, Feldman, Detroit	3:38
12.	"Stay" (Acoustic Version)	Fahey, Detroit, Stewart	3:45
13.	"Prehistoric Daze" (with The Holy Ghost)	Fahey, Stewart	4:59
14.	"Suddenly"	Fahey, Sophie Muller	3:41
15.	"Opportunity Knockers"	Fahey, Muller	4:48
16.	"I Can Drive" (Pull Your Pants Down Mix)	Fahey, Robert Hodgens, Stewart	5:41
