= Rarities (Shakespears Sister album) =

Compilation album by Shakespears Sister
- Released: January 2012
- Genres: Rock, pop, electronic
- Label: SF

Shakespears Sister chronology
Cosmic Dancer (2011)	Rarities (2012)	Remixes (2012)

Rarities is the third compilation album by UK-based pop-rock project Shakespears Sister, released in January 2012 exclusively through on digital format through their website.

== Background ==
Rarities holds true to its title, consisting of rare and unreleased tracks, several exclusive to the album, even a cover of "Venus" by Bananarama, recorded by Siobhan Fahey as a backing track for live performances. Although described by the act as "an updated download package of The Red Room Sessions", only two tracks from The Red Room Sessions are included on here.

== Track listing ==
No.	Title	Length
1.	"A Man In Uniform" (Demo)
2.	"A Man In Uniform" (Alternate Version)
3.	"Another Breakdown" ("Was It Worth It?" Demo)
4.	"Cold" (Gully's Early Mix)
5.	"Cold" (Demo)
6.	"Someone Else's Girl" (Alternate Version with B. J. Cole)
7.	"Hot Room" (Alternate Version)
8.	"You're History" (Gully's Remix)
9.	"Heroine" (Gully's Remix)
10.	"Venus"
