= Remixes (Shakespears Sister album) =

Compilation album by Shakespears Sister
- Released: 29 October 2012
- Recorded: 1988–2005
- Genre: Rock, dance, pop, electronic
- Label: SF, Warner Bros. Records

Shakespears Sister chronology
Rarities (2012)	Remixes (2012)	The Other Side... Demos and Rarities (2013)

Remixes is a remix compilation album from British pop music act Shakespears Sister. The album was previously released on digital format exclusively in 2010 through Siobhan Fahey's website under her own name for a short time before being discontinued. It was released again in October 2012 on CD and digital format through numerous major retailers such as Amazon and iTunes.

== Track listing ==
No.	Title	Writer(s)	Length
1.	"Pulsatron" (Atomizer Mix)	Siobhan Fahey, C. Kenny, S. Gallifant, W. Blanchard	5:58
2.	"Pulsatron" (Skylab Mix)	Fahey, Kenny, Gallifant, Blanchard	3:34
3.	"Pulsatron" (Hugo Nicholson Vocal Mix)	Fahey, Kenny, Gallifant, Blanchard	3:15
4.	"Pulsatron" (The Most Mix)	Fahey, Kenny, Gallifant, Blanchard	6:39
5.	"Bad Blood" (GHP Remix)	Fahey, Kenny, Gallifant, Blanchard	4:34
6.	"Bad Blood" (The Most Mix)	Fahey, Kenny, Gallifant, Blanchard	7:14
7.	"Bad Blood" (Alan Moulder Remix)	Fahey, Kenny, Gallifant, Blanchard	4:09
8.	"Bad Blood" (Jagz Kooner Mix)	Fahey, Kenny, Gallifant, Blanchard	6:04
9.	"Bitter Pill" (Droyds Mix)	Fahey, Kenny, Gallifant, Blanchard	6:26
10.	"Bitter Dub"	Fahey, Kenny, Gallifant, Blanchard	6:25
11.	"Bitter Pill" (Whitney Mix)	Fahey, Kenny, Gallifant, Blanchard	3:56
12.	"You're History" (The Droyds Extended Mix)	Fahey, Marcella Detroit, Richard Feldman	6:48
13.	"Pulsatron" (Instrumental)	Fahey, Kenny, Gallifant, Blanchard	3:15
14.	"Cold" (Revenge Mix)	Fahey	4:10
