= The MGA Sessions =

Studio album by Siobhan Fahey
- Released: 9 December 2005
- Recorded: 1993
- Genres: Rock, pop
- Label: SF
- Producers: Siobhan Fahey, Sophie Muller

The MGA Sessions is the debut solo studio album by singer-songwriter Siobhan Fahey. The album was originally recorded in 1993, but was only released in 2005 exclusively through Fahey's website. Since the revival of Fahey's project Shakespears Sister, this remains her only solo album to date.

== Background ==
The MGA Sessions was first conceived of in 1993 as a joint project between Fahey and music video director Sophie Muller, as a soundtrack "to fit around the script" of MGA, a film directed and written by the two. This film however, was never made for unknown reasons. In 1998, "Was It Something That I Said" was released on CD in an issue of The Passion magazine, credited as "MGA Starring Siobhan Fahey". The MGA Sessions was finally released in 2005 exclusively through Fahey's website, housed in a cardboard sleeve with artwork designed by Robert Ryan, Fahey's cousin. Ryan also designed the cover art for Erasure's 2004 album Nightbird.

In November 2012, the album was re-released through major retailers, such as Amazon and HMV, with an expanded track list and slightly updated cover. This re-release coincided with similar new releases for Shakespears Sister albums #3, Cosmic Dancer and Remixes.

== Track listing ==
Original edition
No.	Title	Length
1.	"Was It Something I Said?"	4:53
2.	"The Possibilities Are Endless"	6:09
3.	"The Darling Symphony"	4:44
4.	"After All"	3:29
5.	"When Will You Be Home?"	3:11
6.	"A Christmas Number One"	3:17
7.	"The Older Sister" (Demo)	2:15
8.	"What's It Like to Be So Wonderful?"	2:49
9.	"The Suppressed Trilogy"	10:39
10.	"The Attic Song"	3:51
11.	"Guilt Edged"	5:04
12.	"Where's the Party"	2:42
13.	"Suddenly" (Bonus hidden track)	3:37

2012 re-release
No.	Title	Length
13.	"Suddenly"	3:37
14.	"Was It Something I Said?" (Alternate version)	4:44
15.	"A Christmas Number One" (Alternate version)	3:44
16.	"Commentary by Siobhan Fahey"	2:23
