= Rarities =

Rarities may refer to:

- Rarities (1978 The Beatles album), released in the UK
- Rarities (1980 The Beatles album), released in the US
- Rarities (Beach Boys album), 1983
- Rarities, an album by the Stranglers, 1988
- Rarities (Roxette album), 1995
- Rarities (The Presidents of the United States of America album), 1997
- Rarities (Atomic Rooster album), 2000
- Rarities (Emilíana Torrini album), 2000
- Rarities, a bonus CD by Repulsion with the album Horrified, 2002 reissue
- Rarities 1994–1999, an album by Silverchair, 2002
- The Rarities, an album by the Stranglers, 2002
- Rarities (Tatsuro Yamashita album), 2002
- Rarities (Ron Sexsmith album), 2003
- Rarities (Indigo Girls album), 2005
- Rarities 1971–2003, an album by the Rolling Stones, 2005
- Rarities (Kinky album), 2006
- Rarities (Black 'n Blue album), 2007
- Rarities (The Living End album), 2008
- Rarities 1979-1981, an album by Cardiac Kidz, 2010
- Rarities (Gin Blossoms album), 2010
- Rarities (Soviettes album), 2010
- Rarities (Jean Michel Jarre album), 2011
- Rarities (Selah Sue album), 2012
- Rarities (Shakespears Sister album), 2012
- Rarities (1998–2017), an album by Natalie Merchant, 2017
- Rarities, a compilation album of "rare" songs by Blue Öyster Cult, 2017
- Rarities (Smile Empty Soul album), 2017
- The Rarities (Mariah Carey album), 2020
- Rarities (Goo Goo Dolls album), 2021
- Rarities Volumes 1 & 2, a compilation album by Lindsay Cooper
- Rarities Volume I & Volume II, a compilation album by the Who

== See also ==
- B-Sides and Rarities (disambiguation)
- Medium Rarities (disambiguation)
- Rarity (disambiguation)
