= Raer =

Raer may refer to:

- Raer Theaker, a Welsh retired artistic gymnast
- Raer, a brand of blended whisky made by Jackton distillery

== See also ==
- Rare (disambiguation)
