= Killed by Death =

Killed by Death may refer to:

- "Killed by Death" (song), 1984 single by Motörhead
- "Killed by Death" (Buffy the Vampire Slayer), 1998 television series episode
- Killed by Death (series), album series compiling punk rock music
