= Get Out (disambiguation) =

Get Out is a 2017 American psychological horror film.

Get Out or get out may also refer to:

== Albums ==
- Get Out (album), a 1992 album by Capercaillie
- Get Out, a 1999 album by Peter Rehberg
- Get Out!, a 2009 album by Cardiac Kidz

== Songs ==
- "Get Out" (song), 2018 song by Chvrches
- "Leave (Get Out)", 2004 song by JoJo
- "Get Out!!", 2000 song by Busta Rhymes from the album Anarchy
- "Get Out", 2012 song by Casey Abrams from the album Casey Abrams
- "Get Out", 1979 song by Cardiac Kidz
- "Get Out", 1995 song by Faith No More from the album King for a Day... Fool for a Lifetime
- "Get Out", 2016 song by Frightened Rabbit from Painting of a Panic Attack
- "Get Out", 1975 song by Tommy Hunt
- "Get Out", 2005 song by Jill Vidal

== Sports and gaming ==
- In bat-and-ball sports, the act of preventing an offensive player from scoring, which forces them off the field
  - Out (baseball)
  - Out (cricket)
- get out (patience term), to succeed at patience or solitaire
- Get Out (board game), a game published by Cheapass Games
