= Medium Rare =

Medium Rare may refer to:

- Medium rare, a degree of doneness used with cooking meat
- Medium Rare (film), a 1992 film from Singapore
- Medium Rare (production company), event production company
- Medium Rare (radio show) (1987–1993), a radio program on CHEZ-FM from Ottawa, Canada
- Medium Rare (Foo Fighters album), 2011
- Medium Rare (The Mighty Mighty Bosstones album), 2007

== See also ==
- Medium, Rare & Remastered, a 2009 compilation album by U2
- Medium Rarities (disambiguation)
