= Cardiac Kidz =

American punk band

- Origin: San Diego, California, US
- Genres: Punk rock, new wave, hard rock
- Years active: 1978–1981
- Labels: Lub-Dub Records, Rave Up Records, Blindspot Records
- Members: Jim Ryan; Jerry Flack; David Rink; Jimmi Flynn
- Past members: Bill Williams; Steve Lightfoot; Tom Roach; Joy Foy; Bill Lubbers; Dave Ewing
- Website: myspace/cardiackidz.com

Cardiac Kidz was an American punk band from San Diego, California, United States, active from the late 1970s through the early 1980s. In 1979, the Cardiac Kidz released two 7" vinyl records; a 45 rpm disc, "Get Out / Find Yourself A Way" and a 33 1/3 rpm EP called, Playground.

They were the first punk band to make a TV appearance in San Diego June 1979 appearing on San Diego's KFMB-TV show "Sun Up San Diego" (Host Jerry G. Bishop) and were played on San Diego mainstream radio stations of the time such as KGB-FM, KPRI and XETRA-FM (91-X) along with local college radio stations like SDSU's KPBS-FM. Articles on the Cardiac Kidz appeared in the San Diego Union Tribune, Kicks Magazine, and the San Diego Reader. The Cardiac Kidz are still featured across the US and in the UK through Independent Radio shows and podcasts such as "Strange Reaction". They performed with many San Diego and Los Angeles punk and new wave bands of that era, such as The Penetrators, The Dinettes, DFX2, Hitmakers, The Standbys; Gary and the Blind Dates, The X-terminators, The Monroes, The Rick Elias Band, The Cock Pits; Claude Coma and The IV's, the Stingers, The Curved Invaders, The Americans, and others.

== History ==
=== Formation: 1976–1979 ===
Jim Ryan drummer/lead vocalist and Billy Williams rhythm guitarist were members of the Southern California punk band Glass Onion during the mid-1970s. Glass Onion did local county tours and debuted at the San Diego Bicentennial fair. They also recorded and performed at the Straight Ahead Sound theatre and Recording Studio in San Diego California. The band performed to moderate success but disbanded in 1976 due to a stylistic division between the pair and bandmate Terry Thompson. Jim Ryan / Billy Williams began playing with Jerry Flack lead guitarist and Steve Lightfoot bass guitarist, eventually organizing the band The Cardiac Kidz. In 1979 and 1980, the band recorded and toured to increasing interest. The Lub-Dub record label, was created by Jim Ryan the drummer and lead vocalist of the band in early 1976. The Cardiac Kidz ’s debut single, "Get Out / Find Yourself A Way", was released in February 1979 on the Lub-Dub label, seven months after the release of the single the group released a 4-song 45 vinyl EP Playground also on the Lub-Dub record label, The songs were taken from a live recorded show at the Spirit Night club located in San Diego. The Cardiac Kidz performed after guest bands The Standbys and the X-terminators performed. This event made the Cardiac Kidz the first San Diego punk band to record a live show and release it on vinyl.The band members were Bill Williams on Rhythm and Lead Guitar and backup vocals, Jim Ryan on drums and lead vocals, Steve Lightfoot on bass, who was replaced by Joe Foy, Jerry Flack, who was replaced by Bill Lubbers on rhythm and lead guitar.

=== Reissue and reformation: 1994 – today ===
In 1994, The Cardiac Kidz name received a boost on the worldwide collectors market when their song "Find Yourself A Way" was included on the compilation, Killed by Death No. 007. "Get Out" was later included on Killed By Death No. 12, while "I've Seen You Before" was on the similarly styled 2001 collection, "Hyped to Death" No. 51. 1999 saw Lub-Dub Records reactivated for the release of a 20th anniversary Cardiac Kidz CD with the full live Spirit Night Club show and unreleased studio recordings.

In 2009, the Italian independent record label, Rave-Up Records, released a limited edition vinyl LP compilation, collecting the single and EP plus rarities. In 2010 the band reunited with Ryan and Flack at the helm, for new recordings and shows.

In 2010, The Cardiac Kidz became the first San Diego local band to release 2 CD's on the same day – January 12, 2010. The CD's titled "Rarities 1979-1981" and "Meet with Me". Independent record label, Blindspot Records, released both CD's. "Rarities 1979–1981" releases all the tracks which appear on the vinyl LP released from Rave-Up records in 2009 plus rare "garage" recordings along with live tracks from the 1979 Spirit Night Club show not available on the vinyl releases.The CD contains 21 tracks. The second CD is a live show recorded at "LeStats West" in San Diego, Ca. on April 11, 2010. The CD contains 12 tracks.

== Discography ==
=== Singles and EPs ===
- "Get Out" / "Find Yourself A Way" – (1979)
- "Playground" – (1979)

=== Compilation albums ===
- Killed By Death No. 7 – (1994) Find Yourself a Way
- Killed by Death No. 12 – (1996) Get Out
- Hype To Death No. 51 – (2001) I've Seen You Before
- Staring at the Sun Volume 9 – (Blindspot Records / 2011) Mary Young
- Staring at the Sun Volume XII – (Blindspot Records / 2017) I Want

=== Albums ===
Three albums of Cardiac Kidz music have been released to date; Two collections of vintage material and a live album from the briefly reunited band.

==== Get Out! ====
Get Out!

Studio album by Cardiac Kidz
- Released: 2009
- Producer: Pierpaolo De iulis

Cardiac Kidz studio album chronology
Playground (1980)	''Get Out!'' (2009)

No album was issued during the Cardiac Kidz original run, however 30 years after the fact, Get Out!, a full album composed of the band's single and EP plus unreleased live and studio tracks, was put together by Italian label, Rave-Up Records. Released on October 15, 2009, the vinyl LP had a limited pressing of 1000 units. This was the Cardiac Kidz first release since their live "Playground" EP, after their previous label Lub-Dub Records was folded in 1978.

===== Track listing =====
All tracks are written by Bill Williams and Jim Ryan; I Got No Time by Bill Williams, Jim Ryan and Jerry Flack; Get Out by Jerry Flack and Steve Lightfoot.

No.	Title	Length
1.	"Get Out"	2:55
2.	"Find Yourself A Way"	3:09
3.	"Monday Afternoon"	3:07
4.	"Mary Young"	3:26
5.	"No You Don't"	3:12
6.	"Oh Yeah"	3:17
7.	"Punkette"	2:52
8.	"Future Shock"	3:28
9.	"Breakout"	3:07
10.	"Bit Of Your Love"	3:21
11.	"I Got No Time"	2:40
12.	"Love Can Be Blind"	3:25
13.	"More"	3:25
14.	"Paper Towel"	3:25

===== Personnel =====
Cardiac Kidz

- Jim Ryan – lead vocals, drums, percussion
- Billy Williams – rhythm guitar, backing vocals
- Bill Lubbers- rhythm guitar, backing vocals
- Joe Foy – bass guitar,

Additional musicians

- Jerry Flack – lead guitar, backing vocals
- Steve Lightfoot – bass guitar,
- David George – lead guitar

Production

- Produced by Pierpaolo De iulis at Rave-Up Records Roma, Italy and Lub-Dub productions, San Diego, CA
- Mixed by Dr Sound, San Diego, CA,
- "Punkett" and "Paper Towel" mixed by Jim Ryan at Circle Sound Studio, San Diego, CA
- Recorded by Dr Sound, San Diego, CA
- Additional Engineering by Jim Ryan
- Art Direction by Pierpaolo De iulis and Jim Ryan
- Graphic Design: Pierpaolo De iulis

==== Rarities 1979–1981 ====
Released by Blindspot Records in 2011, this CD includes all 14 tracks from the Rave Up album, plus a radio ad and nine additional live or demo tracks

==== Meet With Me ====
Released by Blindspot Records in 2012, recorded live at Lestat's Coffeehouse in San Diego. 12 tracks including covers of Buddy Holly's "Words of Love" and the Monkees"(I'm Not Your) Steppin' Stone."
