= Rare =

Rare may refer to:

- Rare, a particular temperature of meat
- Something infrequent or scarce, see Scarcity

- Rare species, a conservation category in biology designating the scarcity of an organism and implying a threat to its viability

Rare or RARE may also refer to:

== Acronyms ==
- Ram Air Rocket Engine, a U.S. Navy program of the 1950s
- Ronne Antarctic Research Expedition

== Music ==
- Rare (Northern Irish band), a 1990s trip hop group
- Rare (Serbian band), an alternative rock band

=== Albums ===
- Rare (Asia album), 1999
- Rare (David Bowie album), 1982
- Rare (Hundredth album), 2017
- Rare (Selena Gomez album) or the title song (see below), 2020
- Rare!, by Crack the Sky, 1994
- Rare, Vol. 1, by Ultravox, 1993
- Rare, Vol. 2, by Ultravox, 1994
- Rare: The Collected B-Sides 1989–1993, by Moby, 1996
- Rare, by Xiu Xiu, 2012

=== Songs ===
- "Rare" (Gwen Stefani song), 2016
- "Rare" (Selena Gomez song), 2020
- "Rare", by Man Overboard from Man Overboard, 2011

== Organizations ==
- Rare (company), a British video game development studio
- Réseaux Associés pour la Recherche Européenne, a computer networking organisation known since 1994 as TERENA
- Rare (conservation organization), an environmentalist group
- Rare (news website), a U.S.-based website

== People ==
- Vanessa Rare, New Zealand film and television actress, film screenwriter and director

== See also ==
- Rarity (disambiguation)
- Rarities (disambiguation)
