= My 16th Apology =

1993 single by Shakespears Sister

Single by Shakespears Sister

from the album Hormonally Yours
- Released: 15 February 1993
- Label: London
- Songwriters: Siobhan Fahey; Marcella Detroit; Richard Feldman
- Producer: Alan Moulder

Shakespears Sister singles chronology
"Hello (Turn Your Radio On)" (1992)	"My 16th Apology" (1993)	"I Can Drive" (1996)

Music video
- "My 16th Apology" on YouTube

"My 16th Apology" is a song by UK pop duo Shakespears Sister, released in early 1993 by London Records as the fifth and final single from their second studio album, Hormonally Yours (1992). The song was written by the duo's Siobhan Fahey and Marcella Detroit with Richard Feldman, and produced by Alan Moulder. Due to both members being on hiatus at the time, the single performed poorly, suffering from a lack of promotion. The three B-sides, live performances from their 1992 concert broadcast on BBC Radio, were later included on their 2011 album Live 1992. This was the group's last release until 2019 to feature Marcella Detroit.

== Track listing ==
- UK CD single
1. "My 16th Apology"
2. "Catwoman"
3. "Hot Love"
4. "Dirty Mind"

== Charts ==
Chart (1993)	Peak position
Germany (GfK)	63
Iceland (Íslenski Listinn Topp 40)	29
UK Singles (OCC)	61
UK Airplay (Music Week)	19
