= Rarity =

Rarity may refer to:

== Concepts ==
- Economic rarity, or scarcity, the economic problem of human want exceeding limited resources
- Species rarity, the position of species organisms being very uncommon or infrequently encountered

== People ==
- Hannah Rarity, a Scottish singer and songwriter
- John Rarity, an English physicist

== Fictional characters ==
- Rarity, a character in My Little Pony Crystal Princess: The Runaway Rainbow
- Rarity (My Little Pony), a character from the fourth incarnation of My Little Pony

== Music ==
- Rarity (band), a Canadian rock band

== See also ==
- Rarities (disambiguation)
- Rare (disambiguation)
