= Songs from the Red Room =

Studio album by Shakespears Sister
- Released: 16 November 2009
- Recorded: 2002–2005
- Genre: Pop rock; synth-pop; new wave; electroclash
- Length: 59:17
- Label: SF, Palare
- Producer: Siobhan Fahey; Stephen "Gully" Gallifent

Shakespears Sister chronology
Long Live the Queens! (2005)	Songs from the Red Room (2009)	Singles Party (2019)

Singles from Songs from the Red Room
- 1. "Bitter Pill" Released: 28 October 2002; 2. "Pulsatron" Released: 1 February 2005; 3. "Bad Blood" Released: 17 October 2005; 4. "It's a Trip" Released: 6 April 2010

Songs from the Red Room is the fourth studio album by British pop-rock project Shakespears Sister, released in November 2009 through SF Records.

== Background ==
Songs from the Red Room was originally planned for release in 2005, under Siobhan Fahey's own name and the title Bad Blood. This release never came to surface however, and was only released four years later as Shakespears Sister, after Fahey revived the project the same year. On 11 May 2010, the album was re-released containing a bonus disc for the first time through major retailers, such as Amazon.

== Critical reception ==
Professional ratings
Review scores
Source	Rating
AnyDecentMusic?	7.1/10 stars
BBC Music	(favourable)
Daily Express	1/5 stars
The Fly	3.5/5 stars
The Independent	(favourable)
musicOMH	3.5/5 stars
NME	7/10 stars
Q	4/5 stars
The Quietus	7.5/10 stars
The Scotsman	8/10 stars

Jaime Gill of BBC Music gave Songs from the Red Room a positive review, praising Fahey's musical creativity yet also criticising the album's long-delayed release, saying "Songs From the Red Room often sounds dated, and unfashionably late to the party when it should have been first." (S)he concluded the review with calling the album "inconsistent, haphazard, dark and occasionally touched by pop genius. Rather like Fahey herself, in fact." Simon Gage of the Daily Express panned the album in his short review, saying "this second outing, without Marcella, is quite another kettle of fish, so wilfully avant-garde in a way Goldfrapp did much better (and earlier) that it makes you dream of the original SS. Or better still, Bananarama." Iain Moffat of The Fly noted both the album and Fahey's musical variety, opening "Post-punk pop goddess, neo-glam eccentric, nu-electro siren… Siobhan Fahey's been many things in her time, but never all of them on the same album before."

Simon Price of The Independent doubted Fahey's intentions behind crediting the album as "Shakespears Sister", but also said "[Fahey's] spiky electro-rock has its moments, notably "Was It Worth It", which reunites Fahey with Terry Hall for the first time since those Fun Boy Three and Bananarama days." Ben Hogwood of musicOMH, whilst noting Marcella Detroit being voted off Popstar to Operastar, said that "Good though Detroit is, it's Fahey who provided a lot of the attitude in the duo – and listening to this album, much that has been good about Shakespears Sister remains." He heavily criticised the album's lack of consistency, saying "What stops this album from ultimately achieving that revenge is its lack of a common voice", but went on to call Fahey a "fiercely creative force." Luke Turner of NME noted the album's difference in sound, saying "The histrionics of [Stay] are replaced by nail-scratch electronics, Siobhan Fahey's voice flapping above turrets of synths manned by robots in pointy brassieres. It's a slightly kitsch success."

Jude Rogers of The Quietus gave the album a positive and lengthy review, citing Shakespears Sister's history and success with "Stay", and reviewing each individual track and how they worked within the whole album, highlighting "A Loaded Gun" as "terrifying and poppy" and going on to lament that "Fahey will always be remembered for the song that destroyed her, and not the career that should have followed it, and the drive that should have made her a pioneering artist. For now, we have Songs From The Red Room, and a 51-year-old woman raging brilliantly against the dying of the light."

== Singles ==
"Bitter Pill" was released as the album's first single in October 2002 under Fahey's own name. It was her first and only release with record label God Made Me Hardcore. The single version has an electronic sound, while the remixed album version is more rock-oriented. The next single, "Pulsatron", was released in February 2005 through Fahey's own label, SF Records. The version that appears on the album, the Whitey Mix, differs from the Vocal Mix single version in that it is slightly re-arranged and omits the chorus. The Whitey Mix does however appear as a track on the 2005 12" and CD single formats. "Bad Blood" was released as the album's third single in October 2005, again under Fahey's own name. "It's a Trip" was released in April 2010 to promote the release of the deluxe edition of the album, this time under the name Shakespears Sister. Technically, this was the first Shakespears Sister single in 14 years.

== The Red Room Sessions ==
In March 2011, The Red Room Sessions EP was released exclusively on digital format through their website. The six-track EP consists of demos and alternate versions of songs from Songs from the Red Room and an original song "Ned", which was later included on Cosmic Dancer.

== Track listing ==
No.	Title	Writer(s)	Producer(s)	Length
1.	"Pulsatron" (Whitey Mix)	Siobhan Fahey, Clare Kenny, Stephen Gallifent, William Blanchard	Siobhan Fahey, Stephen "Gully" Gallifent, Nathan J. Whitey	4:40
2.	"Bad Blood"	Fahey, Kenny, Gallifent, Blanchard	Fahey, Gully	4:14
3.	"Was It Worth It?" (with Terry Hall)	Fahey, Terry Hall, Gallifent, Blanchard	Fahey, Gully	4:17
4.	"It's a Trip"	Fahey, Gallifent, Marco Pirroni	Fahey, Gully	3:42
5.	"Hot Room"	Linda Lamb	Fahey, Gully	4:42
6.	"A Man in Uniform"	Fahey, Daniel Miller, Frank Tovey	Fahey, Gully	3:37
7.	"You're Alone"	Fahey, Kenny, Gallifent	Fahey, Gully	4:22
8.	"Bitter Pill"	Fahey, Kenny, Gallifent, Blanchard	Fahey, Gully	4:50
9.	"Cold"	Fahey	Fahey, Gully	4:02
10.	"You're Not Yourself"	Fahey, Kenny, Gallifent	Fahey, Gully	3:29
11.	"A Loaded Gun"	Fahey, Kenny, Gallifant	Fahey, Gully	5:12
12.	"Bad Blood" (Jagz Kooner Mix – AT Edit) (bonus track)	Fahey, Kenny, Gallifent, Blanchard	Fahey, Gully, Jagz Kooner	4:59
13.	"Pulsatron" (Gully Mix) (bonus track)	Fahey, Kenny, Gallifent, Blanchard	Fahey, Gully	3:15
14.	"Cold" (Death in Vegas Mix) (bonus track)	Fahey	Fahey, Death in Vegas	3:56
Total length:				59:17

iTunes edition bonus track
No.	Title	Writer(s)	Producer(s)	Length
15.	"Someone Else's Girl"	Fahey	Fahey, Gully	4:10
Total length:				63:27

Deluxe edition bonus disc
No.	Title	Writer(s)	Producer(s)	Length
1.	"White Rabbit" (Agent Provocateur Mix)	Grace Slick	Fahey, Gully	3:38
2.	"She's Lost Control"	Ian Curtis, Peter Hook, Stephen Morris, Bernard Sumner	Agent Provocateur	3:39
3.	"Cold" (Demo)	Fahey	Fahey, Gully	3:57
4.	"My World Is Empty Without You"	Holland–Dozier–Holland	Fahey, Gully, Clare Kenny, William Blanchard	4:13
5.	"War (Fear Is Real)"	Fahey, Gallifent, Pablo Clements	Gully, Pablo Clements	4:23
6.	"I'll Be Your Mirror"	Lou Reed	Fahey, Gully	4:27
7.	"Someone Else's Girl"	Fahey	Fahey, Gully	4:10
8.	"Baby It's You"	Burt Bacharach, Mack David, Barney Williams	Gully, Blanchard	2:46
Total length:				31:13

== Personnel ==
- Additional production – William Blanchard, Clare Kenny
- Engineering and programming – Stephen 'Gully' Gallifent
- Digital mastering – Alex Tomlin
- Vocals, guitar, keyboards – Siobhan Fahey
- Programming, guitars, keyboards, backing vocals, bass – Stephen 'Gully' Gallifent
- Bass, backing vocals, guitars, keyboards – Clare Kenny
- Drums, keyboards, percussion, guitars – Will Blanchard
- Guitar, bass, programming (track 1) – Nathan J. Whitey
- Vocals (track 3) – Terry Hall
- Vocals (track 4) – James SK Wān
- Additional guitars (tracks 4 and 8) – Marco Pirroni
