= Sacred Heart (Shakespears Sister album) =

1989 studio album by Shakespear's Sister

Studio album by Shakespear's Sister
- Released: 21 August 1989
- Recorded: 1988–1989
- Genres: Pop rock, dance-pop, synth-pop
- Length: 51:46
- Label: FFRR
- Producers: Shakespear's Sister, Richard Feldman, Jimmy Iovine

Shakespear's Sister chronology
Sacred Heart (1989)	Hormonally Yours (1992)

Singles from Sacred Heart
- 1. "Break My Heart (You Really) / Heroine" Released: 17 October 1988; 2. "You're History" Released: 17 July 1989; 3. "Run Silent" Released: 2 October 1989; 4. "Dirty Mind" Released: 26 February 1990

Professional ratings
Review scores
Source	Rating
AllMusic	3/5 stars
Encyclopedia of Popular Music	3/5 stars
Record Mirror	3/5 stars

Sacred Heart is the debut studio album by British pop-rock act Shakespear's Sister, released on 21 August 1989 by FFRR Records. The album was recorded after Siobhan Fahey decided to leave the girl group Bananarama. Initially intended as a solo act for Fahey, Shakespear's Sister became a partnership of Fahey and Marcella Detroit during the making of the album. The album spawned four singles, including "You're History", released in July 1989, which reached No. 7 on the UK singles chart and was the first release to present the act as a duo. The album peaked at No. 9 on the UK albums chart, and was certificated gold by the BPI.

== Background ==
Shakespears Sister was the first musical outing of Siobhan Fahey after leaving the successful girl group Bananarama in 1988. Fahey began working on Sacred Heart the same year with producer Richard Feldman, who later invited Marcella Detroit to collaborate as a songwriter. Detroit continued to work with Fahey as a "hired hand" until Fahey's husband, David A. Stewart suggested the two form a band, which was supported by Feldman, Fahey's management and her record company.

Although predominantly produced by Feldman, famed producer Jimmy Iovine (who was working with Fahey's husband's group Eurythmics at that time on their 1989 album We Too Are One) co-produced the track "You're History". The UK vinyl LP and cassette versions of the album did not feature the track "You Made Me Come to This", and the international LP version excluded both this track and "Twist the Knife". The album's title track was used in the 1990 film Nuns on the Run, and featured on the film's official soundtrack. The album was released as a 3 CD deluxe reissue and was also reissued on vinyl as part of the "Our History" deluxe box set, released in December 2020.

== Singles ==
A double A-side of "Break My Heart (You Really)" / "Heroine" was released in October 1988 as the album's lead single which, according to Fahey, was to "give a more rounded picture of what I'm about". In North American territories however, "Break My Heart (You Really)" was released as a standalone single, followed by "Heroine" in 1989. None of these releases charted in any territories. It was following this that Detroit officially became a member of the project and the second single, "You're History", was the first to feature Detroit in the music video. Released in July 1989, it became their first hit single, peaking at No. 7 on the UK Singles Chart. The single also achieved success internationally, reaching No. 12 in Ireland, and No. 20 in Australia. The third single, "Run Silent", peaked at No. 54 in the UK, and No. 47 in Australia. The fourth and final single from the album, "Dirty Mind", was completely re-recorded for its single release in February 1990, and peaked at No. 71 in the UK and No. 65 in Australia.

== Track listing ==
All songs produced by Richard Feldman and Shakespears Sister, except as noted.

No.	Title	Writer(s)	Producers	Length
1.	"Heroine"	Siobhan Fahey; Richard Feldman		3:46
2.	"Run Silent"	Fahey; Marcella Detroit; Feldman		3:41
3.	"Dirty Mind"	Fahey; Feldman		4:04
4.	"Sacred Heart"	Fahey; Detroit; Feldman		4:11
5.	"Heaven is in Your Arms"	Fahey; Detroit; Feldman		4:43
6.	"Twist the Knife"	Fahey; Detroit; Feldman		3:46
7.	"You're History"	Fahey; Detroit; Feldman; Patrick Seymour	Feldman; Jimmy Iovine; Shakespears Sister	4:28
8.	"Break My Heart (You Really)"	Fahey; Detroit; Feldman		3:28
9.	"Red Rocket"	Fahey; Detroit; Feldman		4:29
10.	"Electric Moon"	Fahey; Feldman		3:29
11.	"Primitive Love"	Fahey		3:47
12.	"Could You Be Loved"	Bob Marley		4:13
13.	"You Made Me Come to This"	Fahey; Detroit; Feldman		3:09
Total length:				49:52

== Charts ==
=== Weekly charts ===
Weekly chart performance for Sacred Heart
Chart	Peak position
Australian Albums (ARIA)	22
European Albums (Music & Media)	33
German Albums (Offizielle Top 100)	71
Swedish Albums (Sverigetopplistan)	30
UK Albums (Official Charts)	9
Scottish Albums (Official Charts)	40

=== Year-end charts ===
Year-end chart performance for Sacred Heart
Chart (1990)	Position
Australian Albums (ARIA)	99

== Certifications ==
Certifications for Sacred Heart
Region	Certification	Certified units/sales
Australia (ARIA)	Gold	35,000^{^}
United Kingdom (BPI)	Gold	100,000^{^}
^{^} Shipments figures based on certification alone.

== Sacred Heart video compilation ==
Sacred Heart

Video by Shakespears Sister
- Released: 1989
- Genre: Pop
- Label: FFRR
- Director: Sophie Muller

Shakespears Sister chronology
Sacred Heart (1989)	Hormonally Yours (1992)

A video compilation, also entitled Sacred Heart, was released in 1989. It featured the four music videos that had been made so far ("Dirty Mind" had not yet been released).

=== Track listing ===
No.	Title	Length
1.	"Break My Heart (You Really)"	3:55
2.	"Heroine"	3:48
3.	"You're History"	4:23
4.	"Run Silent"	3:41
