= Run Silent =

Single by Shakespears Sister

from the album Sacred Heart
- Released: 2 October 1989
- Recorded: September 1988
- Genre: Pop, new wave
- Length: 3:41
- Label: FFRR Records
- Songwriter(s): Siobhan Fahey, Marcella Detroit, Richard Feldman
- Producer(s): Richard Feldman, Shakespears Sister

Shakespears Sister singles chronology
"You're History" (1989)	"Run Silent" (1989)	"Dirty Mind" (1990)

"Run Silent" (also known as "Run Silent, Run Deep") is a song by British-based pop act Shakespears Sister, released as the fourth single from their debut studio album, Sacred Heart (1989), by FFRR Records. The single mix features Marcella Detroit more prominently than on the album version. The single failed to reach the success of "You're History", peaking at number 54 on the UK Singles Chart, and number 47 in Australia.

== Reception ==
Selina Webb from Music Week commented, "The vocals complement each other more naturally this time, thus losing the drama of the first release. That said, "Run Silent" has a mature pop appeal, basking sumptiously in expansive (expensive?) instrumentation and assured Radio One playlisting." Kevin Murphy from Record Mirror said, "For all those who thought that as soon as Siobhan left the Bananas she'd make a right fist of things, she's doing a bloody good job of proving them wrong. Another mature pop song. Aromas of Kate Bush and the Dream Academy's "Life in a Northern Town" waft in and out as the stately pace builds to a rousing crescendo." Richard Lowe from Smash Hits wrote, "'You're History' was fab, and this is even better, slightly reminiscent of the Eurythmics when they were good in fact. No squawking bits from Siobhan's pal, Marcella, unfortunately."

== Track listing ==
- 7" / 3" CD single
1. "Run Silent" — 3:41
2. "Mr. Wrong" — 3:56
- CD single
1. "Run Silent" — 3:44
2. "Mr. Wrong" — 3:57
3. "Run Silent" (The Run Deep Mix) — 6:10
- Cassette single
1. "Run Silent" (The Run Deep Mix) — 6:10
2. "Mr. Wrong" — 3:57
3. "Run Silent" — 3:44
- 12" single
1. "Run Silent" (The Run Deep Mix) — 6:12
2. "Run Silent" — 3:41
3. "Mr. Wrong" — 3:56
- 12" Revolution Remix single
1. "Run Silent" (Revolution Remix)
2. "Run Silent" (Revolution Dub)
3. "Mr. Wrong"

== Charts ==
Chart (1989/90)	Peak position
Australia (ARIA)	47
UK Singles (OCC)	54
