= Ride Again (EP) =

EP by Shakespears Sister
- Released: 25 October 2019
- Recorded: 2019
- Studio: Sunset Sound; Launmower Studios
- Length: 19:04
- Label: London
- Producer: Nick Launay

Shakespears Sister chronology
Singles Party (2019)	Ride Again (2019)

Ride Again is an extended play by British-American pop-rock group Shakespears Sister, released on 25 October 2019. The EP features three new songs along with new mixes of the two previously released tracks from Singles Party (2019), "All the Queen's Horses" and "C U Next Tuesday".

== Track listing ==
All tracks are written by Siobhan Fahey and Marcella Detroit.

Ride Again track listing
No.	Title	Length
1.	"Time to Say Goodbye"	2:56
2.	"When She Finds You" (with Richard Hawley – Single Mix)	3:41
3.	"C U Next Tuesday" (Perfect Mix)	2:39
4.	"Dangerous Game"	2:58
5.	"All the Queen's Horses" (Video Mix)	3:30

== Personnel ==
Credits for Ride Again adapted from liner notes.

- Siobhan Fahey/Marcella Detroit – vocals
- Marcella Detroit – guitars, harmonica and keys
- Larry Mullins (aka Toby Dammit) – drums, timpani and vibraphone
- Scott Bassman – bass ("All the Queen's Horses" and "C U Next Tuesday")
- Ming Vauz – bass ("Time to Say Goodbye", "When She Finds You" and "Dangerous Game")
- Gillian Rivers – strings
- Greg Forman – hammond organ ("C U Next Tuesday")
- Marco Pirroni – guitar ("All the Queen's Horses")
- Kate Garner – photography
- Kim Bowen – styling
- Bruce Gill at Green Ink – design

== Charts ==
Chart (2019)	Peak position
Scottish Albums (OCC)	24
UK Albums (OCC)	67
UK Independent Albums (OCC)	8
