= Hormonally Yours =

1992 studio album by Shakespears Sister

Studio album by Shakespears Sister
- Released: 17 February 1992
- Recorded: August 1990 – May 1991
- Studios: FPSHOT (Henley-on-Thames, England)
- Genres: Pop rock; indie pop; gothic pop
- Length: 49:52
- Label: London
- Producers: Shakespears Sister; Alan Moulder; Chris Thomas

Shakespears Sister chronology
Sacred Heart (1989)	Hormonally Yours (1992)	#3 (2004)

Singles from Hormonally Yours
- 1. "Goodbye Cruel World" Released: 23 September 1991; 2. "Stay" Released: 13 January 1992; 3. "I Don't Care" Released: 4 May 1992; 4. "Hello (Turn Your Radio On)" Released: 26 October 1992; 5. "My 16th Apology" Released: 15 February 1993

Hormonally Yours is the second studio album by British pop-rock act Shakespears Sister, released on 17 February 1992 by London Records. The album went on to become a critical and commercial success, and is their best-selling album to date. Hormonally Yours peaked at No. 3 on the UK Albums Chart and has been certified double platinum by the BPI, spending 55 weeks on the chart. The album spawned five singles, three of which reached the UK top 20. The album's second single, "Stay" became the group's best-selling single, topping the UK Singles Chart for eight consecutive weeks. It also peaked at number four on the US Billboard Hot 100.

== Background ==
The title of Hormonally Yours derived from both members being pregnant while making the album. Five singles were released from the album, including "Stay", which topped the UK Singles Chart, and is to date the group's best-selling single. An early cassette pressing of the album featured an alternate cover and font previously used on the "Goodbye Cruel World" single. Some versions like the German edition of the album appears to contain a straight mix of "Are We in Love Yet" similar to the BBC Radio live session while others feature the Chris Thomas remix, though he is credited in all releases. Later UK CD issues of 'Hormonally Yours' contain the 7" versions of "Goodbye Cruel World", "I Don't Care", and "Hello (Turn Your Radio On)" while the LP, MC, and the original CD presses contain the original album versions. The US pressing of the album also differed greatly, featuring the album versions of "Goodbye Cruel World", "I Don't Care" and "Hello (Turn Your Radio On)", another remixed version of "Are We in Love Yet", and slightly different versions of "Black Sky" and "The Trouble With Andre" with the former track not segueing into the latter like other pressings, as well as a shortened version of "The Trouble With Andre" and the full-length version of "Let Me Entertain You", as well as featuring a different cover on the CD edition with the titles being vertical like the cassette pressings.

While recording the album, the band watched the 1950s sci-fi B-movie Cat-Women of the Moon and it inspired the lyrics of the songs "Stay", "Catwoman" and "Moonchild".

The album was released as part of a multi-disc, remastered reissue (also on vinyl) as part of the Our History deluxe box set in December 2020.

== Critical reception ==
Professional ratings
Review scores
Source	Rating
AllMusic	4.5/5 stars
Calgary Herald	C
Daily Vault	B+
Encyclopedia of Popular Music	3/5 stars
Entertainment Weekly	B+
Los Angeles Times	2.5/4 stars
NME	5/10
People Magazine	favorable

Tom Demalon from AllMusic praised the album, calling Hormonally Yours "a beautifully quirky, emotionally rich, and nearly flawless pop record", and saying that "It's a vibe that benefits from the contrast between the throaty vocals of Siobahn Fahey and the falsetto flutter of Marcella Detroit. Hormonally Yours is a wonderful, charming album marred only by a few weak lyrics." Gina Arnold of Entertainment Weekly said "Hormonally Yours plays on the idea of female biological madness, and to its credit, it does so without sounding bitchy or melodramatic. Unlike band member Siobhan Fahey's former group, Bananarama, Shakespear's Sis isn't afraid to emote." She also complimented the duo's vocals, saying that " Fahey's deep, uncannily male-sounding voice is perfectly complemented by her American-born partner, Marcella Detroit, who adds more soulful and feminine R&B-influenced backup vocals." Everett True of Melody Maker described it as "often a highly entertaining album of musical pastiche". He was critical of some tracks where the duo "allow grey into their spangled, shiny world to lend 'rock authenticity' to their pop toy", adding that they "forget themselves and pretend they're some kind of female rock retake on Robert Palmer or Bryan Adams". Betty Page of NME felt the duo wanted to "emulate their male rock star heroes rather than carve out their own uniquely feminine niche". She commented, "There's nothing truly contemporary here, nothing truly surprising or startling. Just a strangely misplaced desire to be glam rock muthas. It's like Marcella wants to be Bowie, Siobhan wants to be Bolan, haunted by the ghost of Dave Stewart's guitar."

== Singles ==
"Goodbye Cruel World" was released in October 1991 as the album's lead single, though it failed to reach the UK Top 40, peaking at No. 59. In July 1992, the single was re-released and charted better, peaking at No. 32. Neither releases were fully released outside of the UK. The second single, "Stay", was released in January 1992. It quickly became the group's best-selling single, topping the UK Singles Chart for eight consecutive weeks, and was certified Gold by the British Phonographic Industry. The single reached similar success internationally, reaching the top 5 in territories including Australia, the US, and Germany. It also reached No. 1 in Ireland and Switzerland.

The third single from Hormonally Yours, "I Don't Care", reached No. 7 in the UK, and No. 10 in Ireland. Internationally, the single reached the top 20 in Australia and New Zealand, and No. 55 in the US. The fourth single, "Hello (Turn Your Radio On)", reached No. 14 in the UK, and peaked at No. 97 in Australia on the ARIA singles chart. The song was covered less than two years later by The Bates, and released as the band's debut single. Although this version gained little attention, the song was covered once again by Queensberry in 2009, and in several territories was more successful than the original. The fifth and final single, "My 16th Apology", was released during a period of hiatus, and due to a lack of promotion only peaked at No. 61 in the UK.

== Track listing ==
UK CD version track listing
No.	Title	Writer(s)	Producer(s)	Length
1.	"Goodbye Cruel World"	Siobhan Fahey, Jean Guiot, Steve Ferrera	Chris Thomas	4:01
2.	"I Don't Care"	Fahey, Marcella Detroit, Richard Feldman, Ed Shearmur	Alan Moulder, Shakespears Sister	4:24
3.	"My 16th Apology"	Fahey, Detroit, Feldman	Moulder, Shakespears Sister	4:16
4.	"Are We in Love Yet"	Fahey, Detroit	Moulder, Shakespears Sister	3:32
5.	"Emotional Thing"	Fahey, Detroit	Moulder, Shakespears Sister	3:48
6.	"Stay"	Fahey, Detroit, Guiot	Moulder, Thomas, Shakespears Sister	3:47
7.	"Black Sky"	Fahey, Detroit, Guiot, Ferrera	Moulder, Shakespears Sister	4:03
8.	"The Trouble with Andre"	Fahey, Detroit, Ferrera	Moulder, Shakespears Sister	4:42
9.	"Moonchild"	Fahey, Detroit	Moulder, Shakespears Sister	4:25
10.	"Catwoman"	Fahey, Detroit	Moulder, Shakespears Sister	3:59
11.	"Let Me Entertain You"	Fahey, Detroit, Ferrera	Moulder, Shakespears Sister	4:44
12.	"Hello (Turn Your Radio On)"	Fahey, Detroit, Guiot	Moulder, Shakespears Sister	4:21
Total length:				49:52

30th Anniversary Edition
No.	Title	Writer(s)	Producer(s)	Length
13.	"Cat Worship"	Fahey	Moulder, Shakespears Sister	2:18
14.	"Out to Groove" (demo)	Fahey, Ferrera	Thomas	3:45
15.	"The End" (demo)	Fahey, Ferrera	Thomas	4:05
Total length:				60:10

== Personnel ==
Adapted from album booklet.

- Siobhan Fahey – vocals
- Marcella Detroit – vocals, guitars, programming, harmonica
- Mick Cozzi – guitars (track 1)
- Ed Shearmur, Jonathan Perkins – keyboards
- Jennifer Maidman (Note: credited as Ian Maidman) – bass, piano, keyboards, guitar.
- Steve Ferrera – drums, percussion, keyboards
- Chris Thomas – producer (track 1, 6), remixing (tracks 4 & 6)
- David Nicholas – engineer (track 1)
- Nick Addison – mix engineer (track 1), assistant engineer (tracks 2–12)
- Alan Moulder – producer, engineer (tracks 2–12)
- Lee Manning – assistant engineer (tracks 2–12)
- Laurence Dunmore – graphic design
- Jean-Baptiste Mondino – photography

=== 30th Anniversary Edition ===
- Matt Colton – remastering (tracks 1–13)
- Tom Parker – remastering (tracks 14–15)
- Luke Mornay – mixdown
- Laurence Stevens – graphic design
- LSD Studio – artwork

== Charts ==
=== 1992 charts ===
Weekly chart performance for Hormonally Yours
Chart (1992)	Peak position
Australian Albums (ARIA)	20
Austrian Albums (Ö3 Austria)	21
Canada Top Albums/CDs (RPM)	33
European Albums (Music & Media)	20
German Albums (Offizielle Top 100)	12
New Zealand Albums (RMNZ)	17
Norwegian Albums (VG-lista)	15
Swedish Albums (Sverigetopplistan)	25
Swiss Albums (Schweizer Hitparade)	15
UK Albums (Official Charts)	3
US Billboard 200	56

=== 2022 charts ===
Weekly chart performance for Hormonally Yours: 30th Anniversary Edition
Chart (2022)	Peak position
UK Albums (Official Charts)	37
Scottish Albums (Official Charts)	9
UK Independent Albums (Official Charts)	5

=== Year-end charts ===
Year-end chart performance for Hormonally Yours
Chart (1992)	Position
European Albums (Music & Media)	46
German Albums (Offizielle Top 100)	74
UK Albums (OCC)	14

== Certifications ==
Certifications for Hormonally Yours
Region	Certification	Certified units/sales
Australia (ARIA)	Gold	35,000^{^}
Canada (Music Canada)	Gold	50,000^{^}
Germany (BVMI)	Gold	250,000^{^}
Switzerland (IFPI Switzerland)	Gold	25,000^{^}
United Kingdom (BPI)	2× Platinum	600,000^{^}
^{^} Shipments figures based on certification alone.

== Hormonally Yours video compilation ==
Hormonally Yours

Video by Shakespears Sister
- Released: 1992
- Genre: Pop
- Label: London
- Director: Sophie Muller

Shakespears Sister chronology
Sacred Heart (1989)	Hormonally Yours (1992)	S.F.T.R.R: Videos (2010)

A video compilation was released in 1992 of the same name as the album. It featured the five music videos released so far from the album.

=== Track listing ===
Hormonally Yours video compilation track listing
No.	Title	Length
1.	"Goodbye Cruel World"	4:06
2.	"I Don't Care"	4:16
3.	"Stay"	3:47
4.	"Catwoman" (Live)	3:58
5.	"Hello (Turn Your Radio On)"	4:03
