= Pulsatron =

Single by Siobhan Fahey / Shakespears Sister

from the album Songs from the Red Room
- Released: 1 February 2005
- Genre: Synth-pop, pop rock, industrial, new wave
- Label: SF
- Songwriter(s): Siobhan Fahey, C. Kenny, S. Gallifant, W. Blanchard

Siobhan Fahey / Shakespears Sister singles chronology
"Bitter Pill" (2002)	"Pulsatron" (2005)	"Bad Blood" (2005)

"Pulsatron" is a song by Siobhan Fahey, originally released in February 2005 from her debut solo album, which was later released as her project's fourth studio album Songs from the Red Room. The single peaked at number 95 on the UK Singles Chart, marking Fahey and Shakespears Sister's last appearance on mainstream charts.

== Track listing ==
CD single

1. "Pulsatron" (Vocal Mix) — 3:16
2. "Pulsatron" (Whitey Mix) — 4:42
3. "Pulsatron" (The Most Mix By Princess Julia And Luke Howard) — 6:39
4. "Pulsatron" (Hugo Nicholson Vocal Mix) — 3:15

== Charts ==
Chart (2005)	Peak position
UK Singles (OCC)	95
UK Indie (OCC)	25
