= It's a Trip =

Single by Shakespears Sister

from the album Songs from the Red Room
- Released: 6 April 2010
- Recorded: 2009
- Genre: Electroclash
- Label: SF
- Songwriter(s): Siobhan Fahey, Stephen Gallifant, Marco Pirroni

Shakespears Sister singles chronology
"Bad Blood" (2005)	"It's a Trip" (2010)	"All the Queen's Horses" (2019)

"It's a Trip" is a song by Shakespears Sister, released in April 2010 as the fourth single from their fourth studio album Songs from the Red Room. A music video for the song was directed by Paul Boyd. An acoustic version of the song was also released exclusively through Shakespears Sister's official digital store.

== Track listing ==
- CD single / Digital download
1. "It's a Trip" (Album Version) — 3:44
2. "It's a Trip" (Smalltown Boy Mix) — 5:53
3. "It's a Trip" (Bis Club Mix) — 7:29
4. "It's a Trip" (Punx Soundcheck Mix) — 6:11
5. "It's a Trip" (Apollo 404 Mix) — 3:40
6. "It's a Trip" (Lord And Master Early Dawn Mix) — 7:20
7. "It's a Trip" (Bis Radio Mix) — 3:49
8. "It's a Trip" (Stems Mix) — 3:58
9. "C U Tonight" (Demo) — 5:31
10. "Dedication" — 6:02
11. "Heroine" (Gully’s Ingestion Mix) — 3:33
- Acoustic single
1. "It's a Trip" (Acoustic Version w/ Sam Stewart)
2. "You're Alone" (Acoustic Version w/ Sam Stewart)
