= Rarities 1979–1981 =

Studio album by Cardiac Kidz
- Released: 2010
- Producer: Bart Mendoza and Jim Ryan

Cardiac Kidz studio album chronology
| Get Out! (2009) | Rarities 1979–1981 (2010) | Meet With Me (2010) |

Rarities 1979–1981 was the digital release by the Southern Californian punk rock band Cardiac Kidz of the vinyl LP released by Rave-Up records in 2009. This album, contains the 14 tracks from the vinyl LP plus unreleased tracks from the 1979 Spirit Night Club show in which the EP "Playground" showcased 4 tracks in the 1979 release. The CD also contains studio recordings that couldn't fit on the vinyl LP record. The Cardiac Kidz showcased their ability to cross music genres by producing music that treads over both punk rock, and new wave. Along with Meet with Me, it was released on December 1, 2010 on Blindspot Records.

== Track listing ==
All tracks are written by Bill Williams and Jim Ryan; I Got No Time by Bill Williams, Jim Ryan and Jerry Flack; Get Out by Jerry Flack and Steve Lightfoot.

| No. | Title | Length |
|---|---|---|
| 1. | "Get Out" | 2:55 |
| 2. | "Find Yourself A Way" | 3:09 |
| 3. | "Monday Afternoon" | 3:07 |
| 4. | "Mary Young" | 3:26 |
| 5. | "No You Don’t" | 3:12 |
| 6. | "Oh Yeah" | 3:17 |
| 7. | "Punkette" | 2:52 |
| 8. | "Future Shock" | 3:28 |
| 9. | "Breakout" | 3:07 |
| 10. | "Bit Of Your Love" | 3:21 |
| 11. | "I Got No Time" | 2:40 |
| 12. | "Love Can Be Blind" | 3:25 |
| 13. | "More" | 3:25 |
| 14. | "Paper Towel" | 3:25 |
| 15. | "KPRI Concert Line "Sound Bite"" | 0:30 |
| 16. | "7-Up" | 2:25 |
| 17. | "Baby" | 2:10 |
| 18. | "The Sun Is Shining" | 3:05 |
| 19. | "Over The Brink" | 2:14 |
| 20. | "I've Seen You Before" | 3:04 |
| 21. | "Find Yourself A Way (Live)" | 2:00 |
| 22. | "Human Emotion" | 2:37 |
| 23. | "We're In Love" | 4:23 |
| 24. | "Your Making Me Cry" | 2:47 |

== Personnel ==
Cardiac Kidz

- Jim Ryan - lead vocals, drums, percussion
- Billy Williams - rhythm guitar, backing vocals
- Bill Lubbers- rhythm guitar, backing vocals
- Joe Foy - bass guitar,

Additional musicians

- Jerry Flack - lead guitar, backing vocals
- Steve Lightfoot - bass guitar,
- David George - lead guitar

Production

- Digital Release produced by Bart Mendoza, Blindspot Records, San Diego, CA
- Mixed by Dr Sound, San Diego, CA
- "Punkett", “Paper Towel”, "Human Emotion" and "Your Making Me Cry" mixed by Jim Ryan at Circle Sound Studio, San Diego, CA
- Live tracks Recorded by Dr Sound, San Diego, CA
- Additional Engineering by Jim Ryan
- Art Direction by Bart Mendoza and Jim Ryan
- Graphic Design: Bart Mendoza and Jim Ryan
