= Bitter Pill (Siobhan Fahey song) =

Single by Siobhan Fahey / Shakespears Sister

from the album Songs from the Red Room
- Released: 28 October 2002
- Label: God Made Me Hardcore
- Songwriter(s): Siobhan Fahey, C. Kenny, S. Gallifant, W. Blanchard

Siobhan Fahey / Shakespears Sister singles chronology
"I Can Drive" (1996)	"Bitter Pill" (2002)	"Pulsatron" (2005)

"Bitter Pill" is the debut solo single by Siobhan Fahey, originally released in October 2002 on the label God Made Me Hardcore. The single peaked at number 108 on the UK Singles Chart. A heavily remixed, more rock-oriented version later appeared on Fahey's project Shakespears Sister's fourth studio album, Songs from the Red Room. The song was sampled by American girl group The Pussycat Dolls on their song 'Hot Stuff (I Want You Back)' from their album PCD.

== Track listing ==
- CD single
1. "Bitter Pill" (Radio Edit) — 3:36
2. "Bitter Pill" (Droyds Mix) — 6:27
3. "Bitter Pill" (Bitter Dub) — 6:26

== Charts ==
Chart (2002)	Peak position
UK Singles (Official Charts Company)	108
UK Indie (OCC)	27
UK Dance (OCC)	20
