= Killed by Death (series) =

Compilation album series by Various Artists
- Released: 1988–2018
- Recorded: 1970s–1990s
- Studio: Various
- Genre: Punk rock; hardcore punk; power pop; new wave
- Label: Various
- Producer: Various

Killed by Death is a series of bootleg albums compiling rare punk rock songs primarily from the late 1970s and early 1980s. The first four of these compilations, (Killed By Death #1-#4), were issued in 1989 by the Swedish label Redrum Records and featured tracks by obscure North American and European punk groups, as well as a few more well-known acts such as Wipers, Zero Boys, Subhumans and Beastie Boys. In the years since the release of these first compilations, more than 50 other albums have been added to the series by various anonymous publishers.

== Origins ==
The curators of the Killed by Death series followed a tradition of other album series that compiled tracks from rare punk 45s onto LP. In the early 1970s, musician Lenny Kaye had codified the term "punk" in reference to a genre of music with his compilation Nuggets: Original Artyfacts from the First Psychedelic Era, 1965–1968. The album highlighted minor 1960s hits by groups like the Standells, the Seeds, the Count Five and Electric Prunes mixed with similar-sounding tracks by lesser-known bands. Kaye's original Nuggets compilation sparked a wave of similar records, notably the Pebbles series of LPs, that sought to unearth rare music from the 1960s. Tim Warren's Crypt Records followed up with even rarer and rawer 60s punk rock recordings on its Back from the Grave albums released during the mid-1980s, as did many other small labels the world over.

Meanwhile, a new generation of musicians had picked up on this music and, unlike their 1960s rolemodels, were conscientiously self-describing their music as "punk rock." For many, this went hand-in-hand with a do-it-yourself aesthetic of recording one's own music and releasing one's own records, resulting in low budget productions and limited pressings. Not long after their release, the records were rare and as sought after as many vinyl releases from punk's progenitors of the 1960s. Taking a cue from Nuggets, Pebbles and especially Back from the Grave, Killed By Death filled a niche for those desiring to hear this music at time when it could not be otherwise heard.

== Releases ==
The Killed By Death series was started by Swedish record collector Johan Kugelberg with the first volume's release in 1988, its name borrowed from a song by the British band Motörhead. Inspired by Tim Warren's Back from the Grave series, Kugelberg was encouraged by Warren to start his own series documenting early punk rock. Among the more obscure tracks by non-mainstream bands was the entire first EP by the Beastie Boys who had since switched from punk to hip-hop. When this first KBD record came out, the Beasties were topping the charts with their album Licensed to Ill while their hardcore punk catalog was out-of-print and selling for large sums on the collectors market, prompting Kugelberg to write in his KBD liner notes, "What do you do when a record becomes filthy expensive? Stick it on a comp."

By the end of 1989 Kugelberg's Redrum Records' had released the first four volumes of Killed By Death, after which a fifth and sixth Killed By Death emerged in 1993, issued by an Australian record collector. Over 30 subsequent volumes of Killed By Death were released during the 1990s, all assembled by various anonymous compilers and released independently of one another. This resulted in the records' diversion from any strict numbering system as no one could predict where and when a particular volume of Killed By Death would hit the streets.

Many volumes of Killed By Death were limited to as few as 500 copies, resulting in these compilations of hard-to-find records becoming collector's items in and of themselves. Many volumes of Killed By Death resembled mixtapes of assorted singles from people's personal collections seemingly with no particular rhyme or reason connecting them. Other volumes focused on bands from particular countries, such as France, Spain, Italy, the Netherlands, Canada, Scotland or New Zealand. Several Killed By Death album sleeves boasted "All American punk, no foreign junk," while others homed in on punk rock from a specific U.S. state, such as punk singles from Florida or demo tapes by Californian punk bands.

== "Fake" volumes and spin-offs ==
With no consistency to their production nor regulation of their release, some volumes of Killed By Death were critiqued as being of low quality or dubious origin. All the music on Killed By Death #16 is purported to be traceable back to early recordings made by Phantom Surfers bassist Mike Lucas performing cover versions of 1960s rock and protopunk bands such as The Kingsmen, The Sonics, Steppenwolf, Velvet Underground and The Stooges. Killed By Death #11 boasted tracks by 10 unheard-of punk acts who had names constructed from an adjective and a plural noun (such as Sexy Fits, Curly Fries, and Grumpy Winos), complete with sleeve art reputed to be from the bands' original singles shoddily pasted (as was tradition on all Killed By Death releases) on the album's back cover. However, only one of these groups was real—the then contemporary Frothy Shakes from Nashville, Tennessee—and all the music on the record was theirs.

As the series grew, several spin-off albums and series emerged borrowing the recognizable "Killed by" moniker and logo but replacing "Death" with another signifier. The ultra-rare (200 copies) Killed by Dentistry featured many tracks that appeared on previous Killed By Death collections. It came in a blood-spattered sleeve and is rumored to have been put out by an actual dentist. In the early 2000s an American enthusiast of Scottish punk and DIY music issued three CDs compiling tracks from rare Scottish singles under the name Kilt By Death. Further afield, other albums emerged with tiles like Killed by Synth, Killed by Glam, Killed by Hardcore, Killed by Meth, and Killed by Deathrock, all veering away from what had then become known as "KBD punk" instead highlighting a number of other punk/rock subgenres.

== Killed by Death discography by year ==
Albums are listed in chronological order of release. Additional information about label, country of origin, and actual artist appear in parentheses.

=== Original releases, 1988–89 ===
- Killed by Death #1 (released by Redrum Records, Sweden)
- Killed by Death #2 (released by Redrum Records, Sweden)
- Killed by Death #3 (released by Redrum Records, Sweden)
- Killed by Death #4 (released by Redrum Records, Sweden)

=== 1990s releases ===
1993

- Killed by Death #5 (released in Australia)
- Killed by Death #6: Great Punk Shits (released in Australia)
- Killed by Death #7
- Killed by Death Vol #007
- Killed by Death #13: Rare Punk 77–83 (Redrum Records)

1995

- Killed by Death #8½
- Killed by Death #9

1996

- Killed by Death #10: Sterling Death
- Killed by Death #11 (artist: The Frothy Shakes)
- Killed by Death #12: All American Punk (released by Crypt Records)
- Killed by Death #16 (artist: Mike Lucas)
- Killed by Death #26: Canada
- Killed by Death #77

1997

- Killed by Death #17: All American Punk
- Killed by Death #69: A Compilation of Early Worldwide Punkrock (Redrum Records)
- Killed by Death #100: International Punk 1975–1983
- Killed by Death #200: Rare Punque Francais '77–'83
- Killed by Death #201: Killed by Death D'Italia

1998

- Killed by Death #14
- Killed by Death #15 1/2: Raw Rare Punk Rock 78-81)
- Killed by Death #18: All American Punk
- Killed by Death #19: All American Punk
- Killed by Death #40: Strictly No English or American Junk
- Killed by Death #41: The Punk Police Presents
- Killed by Death #666: Early Worldwide Punkrock
- Killed by Death: British D.I.Y #1
- Killed by Death #F.U. 2
- Killed By Epitaph/I'm Sure We're Gonna Make It (early Dutch punk)
- Killed by Florida

1999

- Killed by Death #20: Young and Bold
- Killed by Death #22: Raw Rare Punkrock '79–'83
- Killed by Death #24
- Killed by Death #202: Five Old Spanish Punk Rock Twelve Inches
- Killed by Death #999

=== 2000s releases ===
2000

- Killed by Death #33: Raw Rare Punk Rock '77–'82
- Killed by Death #1234
- Killed by Death #007
- Killed by Dentistry

2001

- Killed by Hardcore

2002

- Killed by Death #1010011010 (released in Italy)
- Killed by Hardcore #2

2003

- Killed by Death #50: Rare Swedish Punk 1978–82
- Killed by Death #51: Rare Swedish Punk 1978–83
- Killed by Hardcore #3
- Killed By Finnish Hardcore

2004

- Kilt by Death: The Sounds of Old Scotland (1977–1984)

=== 2010s releases ===
2012

- Killed by Synth Vol. 1

2014

- Killed by Deathrock, Vol. 1

2016

- Killed by Deathrock, Vol. 2

2018

- Killed by Death #15: New Zealand Rare Punk 77–82
