= I Don't Care (Shakespears Sister song) =

1992 single by Shakespears Sister

Single by Shakespears Sister

from the album Hormonally Yours
- B-side: "Remember My Name"; "Catwoman" (live)
- Released: 4 May 1992
- Genre: Pop
- Length: 4:25
- Label: London
- Songwriters: Siobhan Fahey; Marcella Detroit; Ed Shearmur; Richard Feldman
- Producers: Alan Moulder; Shakespears Sister

Shakespears Sister singles chronology
"Stay" (1992)	"I Don't Care" (1992)	"Hello (Turn Your Radio On)" (1992)

Music video
- "I Don't Care" on YouTube

"I Don't Care" is a song by British-based female duo Shakespears Sister, released on 4 May 1992 by London Records as the third single from their second studio album, Hormonally Yours (1992). The song reached number seven on the UK Singles Chart and had similar success internationally, reaching the top 20 in Australia, Ireland and New Zealand. It also charted on the US Billboard Hot 100, peaking at number 55. Like several of Shakespears Sister's previous singles, it was heavily remixed for its release as a single, including re-recorded vocals and added instrumentals. The accompanying music video was directed by Sophie Muller.

The song incorporates a segment of the poem "Hornpipe" by Dame Edith Sitwell (from her Façade, and Other Poems poetry book), which is a surreal poem that attempts to capture the flow of a sailors jig. The poem is spoken by Siobhan Fahey on the song.

== Critical reception ==
Tom Demalon from AllMusic described the song as "bouncy and resilient". Larry Flick from Billboard magazine wrote that a "lively, guitar-anchored ditty is fueled by finger-poppin' rhythms and shaking tambourines." He added further that the duo's "unconventional vocal style charms, as do light, retro horn fills at the close. An adventurous pop delight with strong multiformat appeal." Randy Clark from Cash Box called it an "upbeat, slightly quirky pop cut, with an almost '60s-ish jangle to it, featuring the dual vocals of the performance artists". The Daily Vault's Michael R. Smith remarked Marcella Detroit's "ear-piercing wail" at the beginning. A reviewer from Lennox Herald concluded, "While this is unlikely to repeat the success of 'Stay', it will be a hit no doubt."

Paul Lester from Melody Maker commented, "So the title reads, 'I Don't Care', but the subtext is pure merciless revenge fantasy where the singer does care, deeply so. Siobhan Fahey is incredibly rich, extremely angry and quite, quite mad. There's something comforting about that." Pan-European magazine Music & Media found that a "syncopated beat, moulded after Pretenders' 'Don't Get Me Wrong', forms the backing of this remarkable piece of uptempo pop, sporting a catchy chorus." People Magazine also felt that the song "sounds like an effervescent version of the Pretenders." In a retrospective review, Pop Rescue wrote that it "bursts open with Marcella's screaming introduction before wriggling into some wonderful guitar/bass." Troy J. Augusto from Variety described the song as "perky".

== Music video ==
The music video for "I Don't Care", directed by British director Sophie Muller, showed Siobhan Fahey and Marcella Detroit's characters plotting to kill one another. The video ends with a climax on a mock stage - Fahey dressed in Victorian garb, in contrast to Detroit's poised and refrained character. During the first two choruses the band is performing the song, first in rehearsal and the second in concert. The video continued to play on the theme of campy rivalry and conflict between the duo, which started in the videos for "Goodbye Cruel World" and "Stay", both also directed by Muller.

== Track listings ==
- UK 7-inch and cassette single; Japanese mini-CD single
1. "I Don't Care" (7-inch remix) – 4:25
2. "Remember My Name" – 3:35
- UK CD1
1. "I Don't Care" (7-inch remix) – 4:25
2. "I Don't Care" (Henley Board mix) – 4:06
3. "I Don't Care" (LP version) – 4:16
4. "Remember My Name" – 3:35
- UK CD2
1. "I Don't Care" (radio edit) – 4:06
2. "Catwoman" (live on BBC) – 4:21
3. "I Don't Care" (live on BBC) – 4:21
4. "You're History" (Voodoo mix) – 6:31
- European CD single
1. "I Don't Care" (radio edit) – 4:06
2. "I Don't Care" (7-inch remix) – 4:25
3. "I Don't Care" (Henley Board mix) – 4:06
4. "Catwoman" (live on BBC) – 4:21
5. "Remember My Name" – 3:35
- US CD and cassette single
1. "I Don't Care" (radio edit) – 3:56
2. "Stay" (acoustic version) – 3:44
- Australian CD and cassette single
1. "I Don't Care" (radio edit) – 4:06
2. "Catwoman" (live on BBC) – 4:21
3. "You're History" (Voodoo mix) – 6:31

== Charts ==
=== Weekly charts ===
Chart (1992–1993)	Peak position
Australia (ARIA)	18
Austria (Ö3 Austria Top 40)	29
Canada Top Singles (RPM)	37
Europe (Eurochart Hot 100)	25
Germany (GfK)	34
Ireland (IRMA)	10
Netherlands (Dutch Top 40 Tipparade)	9
Netherlands (Single Top 100)	57
New Zealand (Recorded Music NZ)	11
Sweden (Sverigetopplistan)	38
Switzerland (Schweizer Hitparade)	28
UK Singles (Official Charts)	7
UK Airplay (Music Week)	2
US Billboard Hot 100	55
US Top 40/Mainstream (Billboard)	33

=== Year-end charts ===
Chart (1992)	Position
UK Airplay (Music Week)	41

== Release history ==
Region	Date	Format(s)	Label(s)	Ref.
United Kingdom	4 May 1992	7-inch vinyl; CD; cassette	London	
Australia	6 July 1992	CD; cassette	London	
