= Bad Blood (Siobhan Fahey song) =

Single by Siobhan Fahey / Shakespears Sister

from the album Songs from the Red Room
- Released: 17 October 2005
- Genre: Synth-pop, electroclash, pop rock
- Label: SF
- Songwriter(s): Siobhan Fahey, Clare Kenny, Steven Gallifent, Will Blanchard
- Producer(s): Siobhan Fahey

Siobhan Fahey / Shakespears Sister singles chronology
"Pulsatron" (2005)	"Bad Blood" (2005)	"It's a Trip" (2010)

"Bad Blood" is a single originally released by Siobhan Fahey under her own name. It was released in October 2005, and failed to chart. Since its inclusion on Fahey's band Shakespears Sister's fourth studio album Songs from the Red Room, it is considered a song by Shakespears Sister, and the third single from said album.

== Track listing ==
- CD single
1. "Bad Blood" — 4:18
2. "Bad Blood" (Alan Moulder Mix) — 4:11
3. "Bad Blood" (Jagz Kooner Mix) — 6:04
- Digital download
1. "Bad Blood" (Album Version) — 4:26
2. "Bad Blood" (GHP Remix) — 4:34
3. "Bad Blood" (Alan Moulder Remix) — 4:16
4. "Bad Blood" (The Most Mix) — 7:16
