= 3 (Shakespears Sister album) =

#3

Studio album by Shakespears Sister
- Released: September 2004
- Recorded: 1993–1996
- Genre: Indie pop, alternative rock, britpop, glam rock, gothic rock
- Label: SF
- Producer: Siobhan Fahey, David A. Stewart, Alan Moulder, Flood, Andy Wright

Shakespears Sister chronology
Hormonally Yours (1992)	#3 (2004)	The Best of Shakespear's Sister (2004)

Singles from #3
- 1. "I Can Drive" Released: June 1996

#3 is the third studio album released by British pop-rock music project Shakespears Sister, and the first to be released since the departure of Marcella Detroit in 1993. Originally scheduled for release in 1996, the album was shelved after the project's sole member, Siobhan Fahey, was dropped by London Records. London Records eventually gave the full rights of the album to Fahey in 2004, and the album was released through her website. Musically, #3 is a departure from the project's more pop-oriented previous albums, featuring a more rock and alternative-influenced sound. The album artwork was designed by Sarah Lucas, and in 2011, a two-disc expanded edition was released through major retailers. The album spawned the top 30 single, "I Can Drive".

== Background ==
After the departure of Marcella Detroit in 1993, Fahey continued as Shakespears Sister's sole member and began work on #3 in the same year with Robert Hodgens and Dave Stewart. After the mediocre performance of the album's lead single, Fahey was dropped from London Records in 1997. #3 was not released until 2004, independently through Fahey's website. Fahey spoke on the circumstances surrounding the album's release in an interview:

"I tried to fight for [#3] but you cannot win against the giants. I managed to get it through the back door and somehow, miraculously, they put pen to paper and gave it back. It was just sitting there on the shelf and someone said: 'Oh, give her back her record. She just wants to release it to the fans.' It's now out in its original form and features a duet with Billy Mackenzie [of The Associates]. That was the last thing he recorded before he died."

Fahey has stated she was not dropped because of the lacklustre performance of "I Can Drive", but due to her label thinking the album to be "too alternative for a woman of [my] age". The album was released through major retailers in November 2012, in a new "Expanded Edition" of the album, featuring unreleased tracks, B-sides, and remixes. The album cover, featuring a cut-out of Fahey sitting in a room with a tiled carpet and a wall made of newspaper articles, differed slightly between releases. The physical edition featured the artist and album titles written on the wall behind her, whilst the digital edition did not. Both the physical and digital editions of the Expanded Edition had the original titles and "Expanded Edition" written on the wall.

The album's lead single, "I Can Drive" was released in June 1996 to a modest commercial reception, peaking at No. 30 on the UK Singles Chart. The single was not released internationally. Following this, Shakespears Sister were dropped from London Records, making it their last release with the label. In September 2011, "Do I Scare You?" was released as a special promotional single exclusively through Shakespears Sister's website.

== Track listing ==
No.	Title	Writer(s)	Length
1.	"Go"	Siobhan Fahey, David A. Stewart, Robert Hodgens	3:40
2.	"I Can Drive"	Fahey, Stewart, Hodgens	4:05
3.	"Do I Scare You?" (with Billy Mackenzie)	Fahey, Hodgens	4:57
4.	"Opportunity Knockers"	Fahey, Sophie Muller	4:49
5.	"Can U Wait That Long?"	Fahey, Stewart	4:20
6.	"Oh Dear"	Fahey, Muller	4:03
7.	"Excuse Me John"	Fahey, Hodgens	4:44
8.	"The Older Sister"	Fahey, Muller	2:59
9.	"Singles Party"	Fahey, Hodgens	3:58
10.	"I Never Could Sing Anyway"	Fahey, Hodgens	4:10
Total length:			41:45

Expanded edition (Disc 1)
No.	Title	Writer(s)	Length
11.	"Oh No, It's Michael"	Fahey, Stewart	5:08
12.	"Suddenly"	Fahey, Muller	3:42
13.	"Hopeless"	S. Merritt/C. Ewen (Future Bible Heroes cover)	3:30
14.	"Dial F for Freedom"		3:56
15.	"Waiting"	S. Fahey/Maguire	4:29
16.	"The Poison Tree"		1:22
Total length:			63:46

Expanded edition (Disc 2)
No.	Title	Writer(s)	Length
1.	"I Can Drive" (Pull Down Your Pants Mix)	Fahey, Stewart, Hodgens	6:32
2.	"I Can Drive" (Pull Down Your Pants Dub)	Fahey, Stewart, Hodgens	6:06
3.	"I Can Drive" (Roger Weed Remix)	Fahey, Stewart, Hodgens	8:01
4.	"I Never Could Sing Anyway" (extended version)	Fahey, Hodgens	7:19
5.	"Do I Scare You" (alternative mix)	Fahey, Hodgens	3:43
6.	"Do I Scare You" (extended mix)	Fahey, Hodgens	6:09
7.	"Do I Scare You" (Indian Strings Mix)	Fahey, Hodgens	5:02
8.	"Do I Scare You" (demo)	Fahey, Hodgens	4:16
9.	"Boy in a Band"		3:34
10.	"Seventeen"		3:07
11.	"The Attic Song" (#3 demo version)	Fahey, Muller	4:29
12.	"What's It Like to Be So Wonderful?" (#3 demo version)	Fahey, Muller	3:33
13.	"After All" (#3 demo version)	Fahey, Muller	2:38
14.	"Excuse Me John" (demo)	Fahey, Hodgens	3:56
15.	"So Cold"		5:16
Total length:			73:35

== Release history ==
Region	Date	Format	Label	Edition(s)	Catalog
n/a^{[a]}	September 2004	CD	SF Records	Standard edition	SFCD002
United Kingdom	18 April 2005	CD, digital download	SF Records	Standard edition	
n/a^{[a]}	20 August 2011	CD, digital download	SF Records	Expanded edition	SFCD2-02
United Kingdom	5 November 2012	CD, digital download	SF Records	Expanded edition	

a Released exclusively thorough Fahey's website
