= Medium Rarities =

Medium Rarities may refer to:

- Medium Rarities (Mastodon album) (2020)
- Medium Rarities ("Weird Al" Yankovic album) (2017)
- Medium Rarities, a 2018 compilation album by Cattle Decapitation
