= Goodbye Cruel World (Shakespears Sister song) =

Single by Shakespears Sister

from the album Hormonally Yours
- Released: 23 September 1991
- Genre: Jangle pop; indie pop
- Label: London Records
- Songwriters: Siobhan Fahey; Steve Ferrera; Jean Guiot
- Producer: Chris Thomas

Shakespears Sister singles chronology
| "Dirty Mind" (1990) | "Goodbye Cruel World" (1991) | "Stay" (1992) |

Alternative cover
- 1992 re-release cover

"Goodbye Cruel World" is a song by British pop act Shakespears Sister, released in September 1991 by London Records as the lead single from their second album, Hormonally Yours (1992). It was written by Siobhan Fahey, Steve Ferrera and Jean Guiot (a pseudonym used by Dave Stewart, Fahey's then-husband), and produced by Chris Thomas. Initially, the song had little commercial impact, reaching #59 on the UK Singles Chart. Following the success of the album, the song was re-released as a single in July 1992, slightly remixed, this time reaching #32. The music video for the song was directed by Sophie Muller.

== Critical reception ==
Jean Rosenbluth from Los Angeles Times felt the song "exhibit a slinky, funky feel that’s as seductive as a plate of fudge." Dave Jennings from Melody Maker wrote, "Good to see this sweetly vicious little item granted a second stab at the Top 40. It'll succeed this time on the Sister's momentum alone, thus injecting another dose of sexy, sinister glamour into the impressionable minds of the nation's youth." He added, "Smooth and shiny, like a razorblade." A reviewer from People Magazine found that the song "blends the muted oomph of 'Ruby Tuesday'-era Rolling Stones with the exoticism of the Cocteau Twins."

== Retrospective response ==
In 2007, the Daily Vault's Michael R. Smith stated that "Goodbye Cruel World" "sets the perfect mood" as the opening track of the Hormonally Yours album. He added, "How they got the guitars to sound like bagpipes, I'll never be able to figure out." In a 2014 retrospective review, Pop Rescue noted that "this is pop with real drums and guitars and a great blend of scaling vocals."

== Music video ==
The accompanying music video for "Goodbye Cruel World" was directed by British director Sophie Muller, who had previously worked with the band on several videos for their first album. The video features Fahey and Detroit spoofing famous melodramas such as Sunset Boulevard and What Ever Happened to Baby Jane?, depicting a campy rivalry between the duo which would continue in the subsequent videos for the singles "Stay" and "I Don't Care" (both also directed by Muller).

Andrew Collis from Select wrote, "Strides ahead is 'Goodbye Cruel World', which features the Sisters gloriously vamping it up in a whatever-happened-to-Night-Of-The-Living-Dead/Sunset-Boulevard scenario."

== Track listing ==
- 1991 7" / Cassette single
1. "Goodbye Cruel World" — 4:06
2. "Black Sky" — 4:18
- 1991 12" single (released with free poster)
1. "Goodbye Cruel World" — 4:06
2. "Black Sky" (LP Version) — 4:16
3. "Black Sky" (The Black Widow Mix) — 5:51
4. "Black Sky" (The Black Dub) — 4:32
- 1991 CD single (released as a special "Magic Picture Pack")
1. "Goodbye Cruel World" — 4:07
2. "Black Sky" (The Black Widow Mix) — 5:51
3. "You're History" — 4:31
- 1992 7" / Cassette single
1. "Goodbye Cruel World" — 4:01
2. "Moonchild" — 4:27
- 1992 UK Ltd. Edition CD single
1. "Goodbye Cruel World" — 4:01
2. "Moonchild" — 4:27
3. "Are We in Love Yet" (Live on BBC) — 3:42
- 1992 UK CD single
1. "Goodbye Cruel World" — 4:01
2. "Stay" (Acoustic) — 3:46
3. "Black Sky" (The Green Eyed Dub) — 5:53
4. "Break My Heart (You Really)" (Acidic Mix) — 6:23
- 1992 European CD single
1. "Goodbye Cruel World" — 4:01
2. "Moonchild" — 4:27
3. "Stay" (Acoustic) — 3:46

== Charts ==
| Chart (1991) | Peak position |
|---|---|
| UK Singles (OCC) | 59 |

| Chart (1992) | Peak position |
|---|---|
| UK Singles (OCC) | 32 |
| UK Airplay (Music Week) | 23 |
| UK Club Chart (Music Week) | 95 |
| US Modern Rock Tracks (Billboard) | 22 |
