= I Can Drive =

Single by Shakespears Sister

from the album #3
- Released: June 1996
- Recorded: 1995
- Genre: Glam rock, Britpop
- Label: London Records
- Songwriter(s): Siobhan Fahey, Bob Hodgens, David A. Stewart
- Producer(s): David A. Stewart, Flood, Alan Moulder

Shakespears Sister singles chronology
| "My 16th Apology" (1993) | "I Can Drive" (1996) | "Bitter Pill" (2002) |

"I Can Drive" is a song by UK pop act Shakespears Sister, released in June 1996 as the lead single from their third studio album #3. The song was co-written and produced by Fahey's then-husband David A. Stewart and featured the now prominent record producer/writer Jimmy Hogarth on guitar.

== Background ==
"I Can Drive" peaked at #30 on the UK Singles Chart, and was not released internationally. Although intended as the lead single from the band's third album, London Records then opted not to release the album at all and Shakespears Sister were dropped by the company, making this their last release with the label. Siobhan Fahey, the act's only full member by that time, eventually obtained the rights to release the album herself (via her website) in 2005. She later claimed that she was dropped by the label not because of the mediocre chart performance of "I Can Drive", but due to the label thinking the album was "too alternative for a woman of my age".

== Critical reception ==
British magazine Music Week rated "I Can Drive" five out of five, picking it as Single of the Week. The reviewer wrote, "Strings and harpsichord give this return single from Siobhan Fahey an olde world feel. Fahey has her fans, and they'll welcome this unusual offering." Taylor Parkes of Melody Maker noted it is not "melodically repulsive, but, like U2, I just can't take it, simply because of the steaming smugness that streams from every pore". He added, "Bo Diddley remains cool because he has never waivered: preserve us from these Everything but the Girl types who return from the dumper with 'a new sound' and that meaningless commodity, 'attitude', and expect us to swallow."

== Track listing ==
- CD single
1. "I Can Drive" — 4:09
2. "Oh No, It's Michael" — 5:10
3. "Suddenly" — 3:42
- 7" / Cassette
1. "I Can Drive" — 4:09
2. "Oh No, It's Michael" — 5:10
- 12" Promo
1. "I Can Drive (Pull Down Your Pants Mix)" — 6:32
2. "I Can Drive (Pull Down Your Pants Dub)" — 6:06
3. "I Can Drive (Roger Weed Mix)" — 8.00

== Charts ==
| Chart (1996) | Peak position |
|---|---|
| Scotland (OCC) | 32 |
| UK Singles (OCC) | 30 |
| Europe (Eurochart Hot 100) | 76 |
