= Break My Heart (You Really) =

Single by Shakespears Sister

from the album Sacred Heart
- Released: 17 October 1988 (UK)
- Recorded: August 1988
- Genre: Electropop
- Label: FFRR
- Songwriter(s): Siobhan Fahey; Marcella Detroit; Richard Feldman
- Producer(s): Shakespear's Sister; Richard Feldman

Shakespears Sister singles chronology
"Break My Heart (You Really)" / "Heroine" (1988)	"You're History" (1989)

Alternative cover
- Double A-Side single cover

"Break My Heart (You Really)", also known as "Break My Heart", is a song by British pop act Shakespears Sister, released in 1988 as the lead single from their debut album Sacred Heart. "Break My Heart (You Really)" was released in most territories as a Double A-side with "Heroine", which according to Siobhan Fahey was to "give a more rounded picture of what I'm about". In North American territories however, both songs were released as separate A-side singles.

== Background ==
"Break My Heart (You Really)" was released as the debut single of Shakespears Sister, the name Siobhan Fahey adopted for her solo career following her departure from Bananarama in 1988. Speaking to Record Mirror in 1988, Fahey revealed, "Going solo was a very liberating experience. Now I can do the stuff I want to do the way I want to do it, and I've done something of which I'm very proud."

== Music video ==
The music video, directed by Sophie Muller, features a tense-looking man sitting on a chair before a colourful stage. On stage, Fahey sings the song, as various carnival performers – including a juggler, a contortionist, a strongman, a fire eater, dancers, and more – appear alongside her.

== Critical reception ==
Upon its release, the Birmingham Daily News praised "Break My Heart (You Really)" as "a good up-tempo dance tune" with a "catchy chorus" and "good singing in the Bananarama mode". The reviewer thought it "ought to do well". Chris Heath of Smash Hits commented that it "sounds as if it's supposed to be like one of those huge Dead or Alive hi-energy stompers, except that Siobhan sings in a rather unattractive spook-voice". He concluded, "It's infectiously catchy but hardly inspired."

Jerry Smith of Music Week considered the "dance track" to be "a shot at credibility that falls between pop and hip dance and that could be its failing". Marcus Hodge of the Cambridge Evening News noted that the "backing is a little harder" than in Bananarama's work. He also felt that, in contrast to Bananarama's material "where every second was packed with syrupy melody", Fahey's debut single "has the beef but no tune".

Robin Smith of Record Mirror was negative in his review. He commented, "I don't know if her ambition has always been to sound like Hazell Dean but this single certainly does. All that production and it still sounds completely naff. Better luck next time." Edwin Pouncey of NME remarked, "A typical hoofer for the Hippodrome hordes. She should be bard."

== Track listing ==
Double A-side CD single

1. "Break My Heart (You Really)" (Shep Pettibone House Mix) – 7:25
2. "Break My Heart (You Really)" (7" Version) – 3:32
3. "Heroine" (Extended Version) – 5:33

Double A-side 7" single

1. "Break My Heart (You Really)" – 3:29
2. "Heroine" – 3:45

US 12" single

1. "Break My Heart" (Copa Mix) – 6:43
2. "Break My Heart" (Break My Dub) – 3:50
3. "Break My Heart" (Instrumental) – 3:44
4. "Break My Heart" (Yesterday, Today Mix) – 8:08
5. "Run Silent" (Revolution Mix) – 7:15

Canadian 12" single

1. "Break My Heart (You Really)" (Shep Pettibone House Mix) – 7:22
2. "Break My Heart (You Really)" (7" Version) – 3:30
3. "Break My Heart (You Really)" (Dub Mix) – 6:28
4. "You Made Me Come to This" – 3:10

12" promo single

1. "Break My Heart (You Really)" (Shep Pettibone House Mix) – 7:25
2. "Break My Heart (You Really)" (Dub Mix) – 7:53
3. "Pretty Boy" – 3:37

== Charts ==
=== Weekly charts ===
Chart (1989)	Peak position
Italy Airplay (Music & Media)	1
