= Stay (Shakespears Sister song) =

1992 single by Shakespears Sister

Single by Shakespears Sister

from the album Hormonally Yours
- B-side: "The Trouble with Andre"
- Released: 13 January 1992
- Genre: Pop
- Length: 3:50 (album version); 3:45 (7-inch edit)
- Label: London
- Songwriters: Siobhan Fahey; Marcella Detroit; David A. Stewart
- Producers: Shakespears Sister; Alan Moulder; Chris Thomas

Shakespears Sister singles chronology
"Goodbye Cruel World" (1991)	"Stay" (1992)	"I Don't Care" (1992)

Music video
- "Stay" on YouTube

"Stay" is a song by the UK-based pop act Shakespears Sister, released in January 1992 by London Records as the second single from their second studio album, Hormonally Yours (1992). The single was written by Siobhan Fahey, Marcella Detroit, and Dave Stewart (under the pseudonym "Jean Guiot").

"Stay" became a hit, topping the UK Singles Chart for eight consecutive weeks and ending 1992 as the UK's fourth-biggest-selling single. "Stay" also reached No. 1 in Sweden and in band member Siobhan Fahey's birthplace, Ireland. It was a transatlantic hit as well, reaching No. 4 on both the US Billboard Hot 100 and Cash Box Top 100, as well as the Canadian RPM 100 Hit Tracks chart. The accompanying music video was directed by Sophie Muller and drew inspirations from the 1953 film Cat-Women of the Moon. At the 1993 Brit Awards "Stay" won the award for British Video of the Year.

In November 2010, The X Factor contestant Cher Lloyd performed the song on series 7 of the show. Following this, the original version re-entered the UK and Irish charts. As well as being used on The X Factor, the song has also been featured on Britain's Got Talent, Dancing on Ice, Strictly Come Dancing and The Voice UK. A cover version by Ghost, played at the end credits of Insidious: The Red Door, the fifth installment of the Insidious Franchise.

== Composition ==
"Stay" was written by Siobhan Fahey, Marcella Detroit, and Dave Stewart. The song was inspired by the film Cat-Women of the Moon; Stewart conceived the idea of the Cat-Women singing about an earthling that she had fallen in love with, and suggested writing the song to Detroit and Fahey. According to Detroit, Stewart and Fahey used to host parties where she invariably ended up performing ballads with famous guests who showed up at their parties, so Stewart suggested writing a ballad that features her on lead vocals. They rewrote the song "maybe four times." Once they finished writing the song, they recorded a demo and took it to Fahey's home. There the producer Chris Thomas, who had been working with Stewart, listened to the demo and said "No.1 smash!", to which they replied "Really?"

The song was produced by Alan Moulder and Chris Thomas; Thomas helped to produce the final remix when they felt the song was not working. Jennifer Maidman of Penguin Cafe Orchestra created the arrangement for synthesiser in the chorus. "Stay" is the only Shakespears Sister song that features Marcella Detroit on lead chorus, with Detroit singing the verses and Fahey singing the bridge. This would cause tension with Fahey when the song was selected by the record label as the lead single as Fahey felt the song was not typical of the album. Detroit sings in whistle register before the last chorus of the song, going up to a high F (F6). The piano, synth and bass guitar were performed by Ian aka Jennifer Maidman, and the drums by Steve Ferrera, both musicians whose contributions featured throughout the Hormonally Yours album.

== Critical reception ==
The song received favorable reviews from most music critics. AllMusic editor Tom Demalon said in his review of Hormonally Yours, that "everything was lost in the wake of the lovely, dramatic "Stay", a global smash." Christopher Kramer from American Eagle noted that the song "has lyrics that ring of their gospel interests." Larry Flick from Billboard magazine described it as a "complex modern-pop tune" and noted further that the "vocal tradeoff between Marcella Detroit and Siobhan Fahey is both intense and dramatic." Clark and DeVaney from Cashbox felt it's "almost like two separate songs, representing the different influences the pair bring to their music. The first half is Marcie's reverent and angelic sounding voice, then out of the blue, comes the industrial clammer of heavy percussion and Siobhan's rough-edged bridge." Dave Sholin from the Gavin Report stated, "This haunting ballad proves they haven't changed course as they deliver a melody that has true staying power." Another Gavin Report editors, Rufer & Fell, wrote that the female duo "gives a once-in-a-lifetime performance of a moody and deliberate song about staying power in a relationship." Chuck Campbell from Knoxville News-Sentinel described it as a "disarmingly sweet ballad" and added that it "segues into a stern warning ("I'll go anywhere with you/I'll do anything it takes/But if you try to go it alone/Don't think I'll understand") then concludes rather sinisterly."

Sally Margaret Joy from Melody Maker complimented it as a "pretty hymn about human frailty", adding, "Yes, it's got a great hook, with Marcella's voice quavering up high and tremulously." Pan-European magazine Music & Media felt that Detroit's vibrato "gives the tune the ethereal ambiance of classic Marianne Faithfull material. Towards the end of the song Fahey takes over with her slightly darker voice." In the review of the single, they remarked that "after a slow start backed by minimal arrangements, this serious ballad slowly acquires some bite." Terry Staunton from New Musical Express opined that they "are trying a little too hard to be the Thelma & Louise of weirdo-chick-bubblegum-pop these days." Lucy O'Brien from Select stated that Detroit "makes a brave stab at the anthemic ballad with "Stay", but ends up sounding suspiciously like Jennifer Rush." Siân Pattenden from Smash Hits felt it "sounds like a hymn". A reviewer from St. Petersburg Times deemed the song "the year's best single" and commented, "You'd better hope and pray/That you make it safe/Back to your own world. Just try to ignore former Bananarama B-girl Siobhan Fahey, as she growls like a master berating her slave".

== Retrospective response ==
Daily Vault's Michael R. Smith declared "Stay" as a "masterpiece", writing that the song managed to "show the world just what could be done to an otherwise mundane and ordinary ballad. It not only turned the entire pop formula on its ear, it totally blew the possibilities wide open." Tom Ewing of Freaky Trigger remarked "the teetering, cracking soprano" of Detroit's lead vocal, and Fahey's "growled and throaty intervention" on the bridge. He also felt that "obviously, the switched-dynamics form of the song matches its content: a tale of two worlds, the singer's and the subject's, and the relationship between them. One is claustrophobic, intense, something to escape: the other reached by risky passage, but where safety is hardly guaranteed and worse terrors may lurk." Imran Khan of PopMatters called it a "weird sci-fi ballad of gothic-gospel electronica". In his review of their 2019 compilation album, Singles Party, Christopher Smith from Talk About Pop Music described it as "haunting" and "epic".

== Music video ==
=== Background, development, and release ===
British director Sophie Muller directed the promo video for the single, the concept of which was also inspired by the film Cat-Women of the Moon (1953). The video featured Detroit and Fahey fighting over a comatose man (played by Dave Evans, former boyfriend of Fahey's Bananarama bandmate Keren Woodward). Fahey described her looks as "unhinged Victorian heroine meets Suzi Quatro meets Labelle", an angel of death "in dark makeup coming down the stairs from another dimension". The part where Fahey walks down the stairs was inspired by Powell and Pressburger's film A Matter of Life and Death (1946).

The video won Best Video at the 1993 Music Week Awards and Brit Awards, and was the subject of a spoof by comedians French & Saunders. The video was featured in the Top 100 Music Videos of all time by Channel 4.

=== Synopsis ===
In some rare versions the beginning quotes a variation of the opening of William Shakespeare's Macbeth: The original quote of the play ("When shall we three meet again") is changed to "When shall we two meet again", referring to the story told in the video.

The video starts with a view of a calm night sky wherein a shooting star passes over a full moon and the song begins. The camera pans back into what appears to be a hospital room showing Marcella Detroit and her male lover (Evans), who is in a coma and on the verge of death. As Detroit tends to him, she sings to him not to leave her. At the bridge of the song, a portal opens and the angel of death, played by Fahey, appears at the top of a staircase, wearing a sparkling catsuit. She dances around in front of a bright light whilst mocking Detroit that she cannot save her lover and the best she can hope for is to return safely to her environment. Detroit tries her best to wake the man up, while Death slowly and eerily makes her way down the stairs to claim his soul. The two women begin fighting over the man, indicating literally and figuratively a fight between life (Detroit) and death (Fahey). During their struggle, the man finally wakes up, and he and Detroit embrace while Death, having failed to seduce him into her realm, walks away in disgust and goes back up the staircase and into the light.

== Track listings ==
- UK 7-inch and cassette single
1. "Stay" (radio mix) – 3:48
2. "The Trouble with Andre" – 4:03
- UK CD single 1
1. "Stay" (LP version) – 3:48
2. "Dirty Mind" (E-Zee remix) – 6:25
3. "Run Silent" (Revolution remix) – 7:16
4. Excerpts from Hormonally Yours – 6:02
- UK CD single 2
1. "Stay" – 3:48
2. "Stay" (LP version) – 3:50
3. "The Trouble with Andre" – 4:44
- US CD single
1. "Stay" (LP version) – 3:47
2. "Remember My Name" – 3:35
3. Special previews ("Catwoman"; "Goodbye Cruel World"; "I Don't Care")
- US cassette single

A1. "Stay" – 3:47
A2. Special previews ("Catwoman"; "Goodbye Cruel World"; "I Don't Care")
B1. "The Trouble with Andre" – 4:03

== Charts ==
=== Weekly charts ===
Chart (1992)	Peak position
Australia (ARIA)	3
Austria (Ö3 Austria Top 40)	4
Belgium (Ultratop 50 Flanders)	9
Canada Top Singles (RPM)	4
Canada Adult Contemporary (RPM)	31
Europe (Eurochart Hot 100)	4
France (SNEP)	40
Germany (GfK)	3
Ireland (IRMA)	1
Israel (Israeli Singles Chart)	5
Netherlands (Dutch Top 40)	26
Netherlands (Single Top 100)	28
New Zealand (Recorded Music NZ)	5
Norway (VG-lista)	6
Sweden (Sverigetopplistan)	1
Switzerland (Schweizer Hitparade)	2
UK Singles (Official Charts)	1
UK Airplay (Music Week)	3
US Billboard Hot 100	4
US Adult Contemporary (Billboard)	39
US Modern Rock Tracks (Billboard)	25
US Top 40/Mainstream (Billboard)	18
US Top 40/Rhythm-Crossover (Billboard)	28
US Cash Box Top 100	4

Chart (2010)	Peak position
Ireland (IRMA)	10
Scottish Singles Sales (Official Charts)	11
UK Singles (Official Charts)	12

=== Year-end charts ===
Chart (1992)	Position
Australia (ARIA)	21
Austria (Ö3 Austria Top 40)	16
Canada Top Singles (RPM)	49
Europe (Eurochart Hot 100)	15
Germany (Media Control)	19
Israel (Israeli Singles Chart)	35
New Zealand (RIANZ)	42
Sweden (Topplistan)	12
Switzerland (Schweizer Hitparade)	13
UK Singles (OCC)	4
UK Airplay (Music Week)	6
US Billboard Hot 100	45
US Cash Box Top 100	36

=== Decade-end charts ===
Chart (1990–1999)	Rank
Austria (Ö3 Austria Top 40)	82

== Certifications and sales ==
Region	Certification	Certified units/sales
Australia (ARIA)	Gold	35,000^{^}
United Kingdom (BPI)	Gold	484,500
United States (RIAA)	Gold	500,000^{^}
^{^} Shipments figures based on certification alone.

== Release history ==
Region	Date	Format(s)	Label(s)	Ref.
United Kingdom	13 January 1992	7-inch vinyl; CD; cassette	London	
Australia	16 March 1992	CD; cassette	London; Polydor	
Japan	10 April 1992	Mini-CD	London	
