= Heroine (Shakespears Sister song) =

Single by Shakespears Sister

from the album Sacred Heart
- Released: 1988
- Recorded: August 1988
- Genre: Dance-pop, house
- Label: FFRR
- Songwriter(s): Siobhan Fahey; Richard Feldman
- Producer(s): Shakespear's Sister; Richard Feldman

Shakespears Sister singles chronology
| "Break My Heart" / "Heroine" (1988) | "You're History" (1989) |

Alternative cover
- Double A-Side single cover.

"Heroine" is a song by British pop act Shakespears Sister, released in 1988 as a single from their debut album Sacred Heart. "Heroine" was released in most territories as a Double A-side with "Break My Heart (You Really)", which according to Siobhan Fahey was to "give a more rounded picture of what I'm about". In North American territories however, both songs were released as separate A-side singles.

== Track listing ==
- Canadian 12" single
1. "Heroine" (Extended Version) — 5:29
2. "Dirty Mind" — 4:06
3. "Heroine" (Live in Leningrad) — 4:45
4. "Dirty Mind" (Live in Leningrad) — 4:42
- Double A-side CD single
1. "Break My Heart (You Really)" (Shep Pettibone House Mix) — 7:25
2. "Break My Heart (You Really)" (7" Version) — 3:32
3. "Heroine" (Extended Version) — 5:33
- Double A-side 7" single
1. "Break My Heart (You Really)" — 3:29
2. "Heroine" — 3:45
- US 12" single
1. "Heroine" — 5:33
2. "Heroine" (LP Version) — 3:45
3. "Dirty Mind" — 4:06
4. "Heroine" (Live) — 4:52
5. "Dirty Mind" (Live) — 4:44
