= Dirty Mind (Shakespears Sister song) =

Single by Shakespears Sister

from the album Sacred Heart
- Released: 26 February 1990
- Recorded: 1988
- Genre: Synth-pop, new wave
- Length: 4:11
- Label: FFRR Records
- Songwriter(s): Siobhan Fahey; Marcella Detroit; Richard Feldman
- Producer(s): Duncan Bridgeman

Shakespears Sister singles chronology
| "Run Silent" (1989) | "Dirty Mind" (1990) | "Goodbye Cruel World" (1991) |

"Dirty Mind" is a song by UK-based pop act Shakespears Sister, released as the fifth and final single from their debut studio album Sacred Heart by FFRR Records. The song, originally produced by Richard Feldman, was completely re-recorded and remixed by Duncan Bridgeman for its release as a single, and includes a rap by Marcella Detroit.

== Track listing ==
- 7" single
1. "Dirty Mind" (1990 Version) — 4:11
2. "Dirty Mind" — 4:04
- CD single
1. "Dirty Mind" (1990 Version) — 4:11
2. "Electric Moon" — 3:28
3. "Dirty Mind" (Extended 1990 Version) — 6:29
- 12" single / Cassette
1. "Dirty Mind" (Extended 1990 Version) — 6:29
2. "Dirty Mind" — 4:10
3. "Electric Moon" — 3:25
- 12" E-Zee Remix single
1. "Dirty Mind" (E-Zee Remix)
2. "Run Silent" (Revolution Mix)

== Charts ==
Chart performance for "Dirty Mind"
| Chart (1990) | Peak position |
|---|---|
| Australia (ARIA) | 65 |
| UK Singles (Official Charts Company) | 71 |
