= Richard Feldman (songwriter) =

American songwriter

Richard Feldman is a songwriter and producer, raised in Tulsa, Oklahoma. He worked at Leon Russell's The Church Studio in Tulsa before moving to Los Angeles in 1978, where he was hired to lead the A&R division of Shelter Records. That year he co-wrote "Promises" for Eric Clapton with Roger Linn. The demo was recorded using an early version of the Linndrum. He also wrote songs for the Pointer Sisters, Atlantic Starr, Don Williams, Joe Cocker, The Wailing Souls and many others as well as writing and producing music for Belinda Carlisle, Shakespears Sister and Midge Ure.

Feldman won a Grammy for best reggae album in 2004 for Toots and the Maytals True Love. He was president of the AIMP (Association of Independent Music Publishers) from 2009 to 2012 creating the Nashville chapter during his term. He remains CEO of Artists First Music and runs Rijo Investment Group based in Encino, California.
