= Shakespears Sister =

UK-based pop rock band

- Origin: London, England
- Genres: Pop rock; alternative rock; dance-pop; synth-pop; indie pop; gothic rock
- Years active: 1988–1996; 2009–2010; 2019
- Labels: FFRR; London; SF Records
- Members: Siobhan Fahey; Marcella Detroit
- Website: shakespearssisterofficial.com

Shakespears Sister are an alternative pop and rock musical duo that was formed in 1988 by Irish singer-songwriter Siobhan Fahey, a former member of Bananarama. Shakespears Sister was initially a solo act but became a duo by 1989 with the addition of American musician Marcella Detroit. Together they released two top-ten albums and a string of top-forty hits, including the 1992 single "Stay", which remained at No. 1 on the UK Singles Chart for eight weeks. Detroit was let go from the band in 1993, leaving Fahey as the sole member again, until the latter ended the project in 1996. After working under her own name for some years, Fahey revived the Shakespears Sister moniker in 2009. In 2019, Fahey and Detroit reunited as Shakespears Sister for a tour and released the singles "All the Queen's Horses" and "When She Finds You", and the EP Ride Again.

== History ==
=== 1988–1990: Beginnings and Sacred Heart ===
Shakespears Sister was conceived as a solo project by Siobhan Fahey, a one-time punk turned chart-pop singer who had left the successful British/Irish girl-group Bananarama in 1988, due to disillusionment with the group's musical direction. The name was adapted from the title of the song "Shakespeare's Sister" by The Smiths, which was in turn a reference to Virginia Woolf's work A Room of One's Own. According to Fahey, the misspelling began with an accidental punctuation slip on a woodcut sign (the missing apostrophe from Shakespeare's). She decided to keep it because "It made it sort of my thing, as opposed to the song by The Smiths". Fahey has described the meaning of the name being "Siobhan Fahey is the mother, the sister, the daughter, it's not the artist. The artist is Shakespears Sister."

Fahey began writing and recording work for the project with their record producer Richard Feldman. Several other musicians were involved in the songwriting, one of whom was Feldman's friend and colleague Marcy Levy, a veteran of live and studio work with Eric Clapton (with whom she had written "Lay Down Sally"), Leon Russell and Bob Seger as well as a songwriter for artists including Jennifer Rush, Chaka Khan and Patty Weaver. An accomplished singer and multi-instrumentalist (guitar, harmonica and keyboards), Levy also made vocal and instrumental contributions to the sessions, staying on as a prominent 'hired hand'. During this time, Fahey suggested that Levy — who had previously failed to get a couple of solo albums released — take on a new professional name in order to gain a new lease of artistic life. Levy agreed and restyled herself as Marcella Detroit, a name she has used throughout her time with Shakespears Sister and afterwards.

The debut Shakespears Sister single was "Break My Heart (You Really)/Heroine" (released as a double A-side in the UK and as two separate singles in the United States, although none of the releases charted successfully). "Break My Heart" had been intended to differentiate Fahey's solo artist persona from her past work with Bananarama. David A. Stewart (Fahey's then-husband and a member of Eurythmics) had been impressed by the musical chemistry between Fahey and Detroit in the recording studio. Seeing potential benefit in turning Shakespears Sister from a solo project into a band, he suggested that Fahey and Detroit should unite as a duo. It was a suggestion that was backed by Feldman, Fahey's management, and her record company, London Records. Despite initial reluctance from both women (both of whom wished to retain their independence and avoid band commitments), Detroit was invited to become "a 50% member" towards the end of the recording sessions. She would later recall "by the time we did the last song on the first album, my role became more integral... I didn't just want to be a background singer... It was Siobhan's band, this was made perfectly clear. But I was cool with that – that's the way it was."

The second Shakespears Sister single, "You're History", gave the project its breakthrough hit. The song displayed the effectiveness of the vocal pairing of Fahey and Detroit, setting the former's sly, murmuring contralto against the latter's R&B-influenced soprano and falsetto parts. It also features a solo from guitarist Stevie Salas. "You're History" reached the top 10 on the UK Singles Chart in the summer of 1989, as did the debut Shakespears Sister album, Sacred Heart, which was certified Gold by the BPI. Two further singles were released from the album, "Run Silent" and "Dirty Mind", though both failed to peak within the Top 50 of the UK chart.

=== 1991–1993: Hormonally Yours and departure of Marcella Detroit ===
In September 1991, Shakespears Sister released a new single, "Goodbye Cruel World", which peaked at No. 59. The next single, "Stay", marked Shakespears Sister's first and only No. 1. It remained at the top of the UK Singles Chart for eight full weeks, achieved similar success on international charts, and won Best British Video at the 1993 BRIT Awards. Notably the song foregrounded Detroit, who sang the majority of the lead vocals and featured prominently in the video. This allegedly led to tension with Fahey; Detroit later claimed that Fahey felt sidelined as the project's instigator and usual lead vocalist, didn't consider the song to be representative of the band, and had opposed its release as a single.

Hormonally Yours was released the following month. The album sold well on the strength of "Stay", eventually being certified double platinum by the BPI. The duo continued to enjoy success with further singles from Hormonally Yours: "I Don't Care" peaked at No. 7, "Hello (Turn Your Radio On)" at No. 14, and a re-release of "Goodbye Cruel World" at No. 32. During 1992, however, tensions between Fahey and Detroit became overt, with backstage infighting and arguments marring the band's tour. A fifth single, "My 16th Apology", was released in early 1993, reaching No. 61.

Although Fahey and Detroit seemed at first to have resolved their differences, Fahey was struggling with personal issues. That led to the cancellation of what would have been the band's highest-profile concert, at the Royal Albert Hall, and Fahey's temporary hospitalization for depression. The duo decided to put Shakespears Sister on hiatus, and Detroit began working on a solo album (something which had already been agreed and scheduled around band work). During this time Fahey decided to end her partnership with Detroit but chose not to discuss this with her directly. Instead, Detroit was publicly dismissed at the 1993 Ivor Novello Awards ceremony, at which Hormonally Yours won Best Contemporary Collection of Songs (and which Detroit attended, although Fahey did not). Fahey's acceptance speech, delivered by her publisher, contained a farewell to Detroit wishing her "all the best for the future, all's well that ends well."

While unsurprised at the final dissolution of the partnership, Detroit was distressed by the way it ended and how it was announced. Many years later, she would comment "I was never in it to steal anyone's glory away; I just did my job. I was asked by everybody to become part of it and then everybody wanted me out... I learned a lot about what it means to be an artist... To put two people as different as we were together – well, we were bound to have differences personality-wise. In the video for 'Stay', I was singing to this guy who was dying and she (Siobhan) was the Angel of Death. We used our personality differences to our advantage, but it was a little too real!"

Detroit and Fahey did not speak to or see each other for over 25 years before eventually meeting up and reconnecting again in 2018.

=== 1994–2004: #3 and hiatus ===
Having now reverted to being a Siobhan Fahey solo project, Shakespears Sister remained inactive for three years while Fahey attended to issues in her personal life, including a divorce from Stewart (who remained one of the two producers of her new material). In June 1996, the project returned with a new single, "I Can Drive". This met with a lukewarm commercial reception, peaking at No. 30 on the UK charts, and was not released outside of the UK. The relative failure of "I Can Drive" prompted London Records to cancel the release of Shakespears Sister's completed third album, #3. Continuing disagreements between London and Fahey resulted in her leaving the company with whom she had been signed for fifteen years since being with Bananarama. Fahey would later claim that Shakespears Sister was dropped not because of "I Can Drive"'s commercial performance, but due to London Records thinking that the album (which had a notably darker and rockier tone than its predecessors) was "too alternative for a woman of my age".

Discouraged with the Shakespears Sister identity, Fahey would go on to release her next single, "Bitter Pill" under her own name in 2002. In 2004, The Best of Shakespear's Sister was released, compiling the group's hits and B-sides as well as including a number of tracks from the unreleased third album. In the same year, Fahey obtained the full rights to #3 from London Records and made plans to release it independently.

In 2004, #3 was finally made available via Fahey's own website. Also in 2005, a second compilation album, Long Live the Queens!, collected various Shakespears Sister rarities, remixes and unreleased tracks. 2005 also saw the release of a second Fahey solo single, "Pulsatron", which charted slightly better than its predecessor, reaching No. 95 - to date, Fahey's final chart appearance.

=== 2005-2012: Songs from the Red Room and music from the vaults ===
"Bitter Pill" and "Pulsatron" were originally intended to appear on Fahey's post-Shakespears Sister solo album, Bad Blood. Although the title track was released as Fahey's third solo single in 2005, the album release was cancelled. Bad Blood did not surface for another four years, until Fahey opted to relaunch the Shakespears Sister name in 2009. The album was retitled Songs from the Red Room and came out on Fahey's own label, SF Records. A fourth and final single from the record, "It's a Trip", followed in April 2010. Around the same time a deluxe version of the album was released with an extra CD of material.

Shakespears Sister completed a ten date April 2010 UK Tour. The band also performed at the Isle of Wight Festival in 2010.

In 2012, Shakespears Sister released two further compilation albums – Cosmic Dancer, consisting of left-over and acoustic tracks, some of which had previously been sold digitally through the band's website; and a remix compilation. An expanded edition of #3 was also issued, containing tracks that had only previously been available to purchase online.

=== 2019–present: Reunion, Singles Party and Ride Again EP ===
In May 2019, it was announced that Fahey and Detroit would reunite on stage later in the year. A UK tour, titled Shakespears Sister Ride Again, was announced during the same month, and was launched in Nottingham on 31 October 2019, before playing 13 other gigs across the UK during the following month. A new single, "All the Queen's Horses", was released on 15 May, with an accompanying music video. This was followed by the compilation album, Singles Party, in July 2019.

The duo performed "Stay" on The Graham Norton Show on 10 May 2019, their first TV performance together since 1993. They also announced that they were recording an EP of new material. The EP Ride Again was released on 25 October 2019, preceded by the single "When She Finds You" which was released 4 September 2019. The single is a collaboration with Richard Hawley, who also appears in the accompanying music video.

In December 2021, Detroit confirmed there had been talk of more music from the duo but, at that point, she and Fahey had yet to resume writing together.

== Discography ==
=== Studio albums ===
- Sacred Heart (1989)
- Hormonally Yours (1992)
- #3 (2004)
- Songs from the Red Room (2009)

=== Compilation albums ===
- Best of Shakespear's Sister (2004)
- Long Live the Queens! (2005)
- Cosmic Dancer (2011)
- Singles Party (2019)

=== Extended plays ===
- Ride Again (2019)

== Tours ==
- Hormonally Yours Tour (1992)
- Songs from the Red Room Tour (2010)
- Shakespears Sister Ride Again (2019)

== Awards and nominations ==
Brit Awards

Year	Nominee / work	Award	Result
1990	Themselves	British Breakthrough Act	Nominated
1992	"Goodbye Cruel World"	British Video of the Year	Nominated
1993	Hormonally Yours	British Album of the Year	Nominated
1993	"Stay"	British Single of the Year	Nominated
1993	"Stay"	British Video of the Year	Won
1993	Themselves	British Group	Nominated

Ivor Novello Awards

Year	Nominee / work	Award	Result
1993	"Stay"	Best Contemporary Song	Nominated
1993	"Stay"	Most Performed Work	Nominated
1993	"Stay"	Best Selling Song	Nominated
1993	"Stay"	International Hit of the Year	Nominated
1993	Themselves	Outstanding Contemporary Song Collection	Won

MTV Video Music Awards

Year	Nominee / work	Award	Result
1992	"Stay"	International Viewer's Choice Award for MTV Europe	Nominated
1993	"Hello (Turn Your Radio On)"	International Viewer's Choice Award for MTV Europe	Nominated

Music Week Awards

Year	Nominee / work	Award	Result	Ref.
2020	Themselves	Catalogue Marketing Campaign	Nominated	

RSH Gold Awards

Year	Nominee / work	Award	Result
1993	Themselves	Best Duo	Won

Smash Hits Poll Winners Party

Year	Nominee / work	Award	Result
1989	Themselves	Most Promising New Group	Nominated
