= You're History =

1989 single by Shakespears Sister

Single by Shakespears Sister

from the album Sacred Heart
- B-side: "Dirty Mind" (live); "Heroine" (live)
- Released: 17 July 1989
- Length: 4:27
- Label: FFRR
- Songwriters: Siobhan Fahey; Marcella Detroit; Richard Feldman; Patrick Seymour
- Producers: Shakespears Sister; Jimmy Iovine; Richard Feldman

Shakespears Sister singles chronology
"Break My Heart (You Really)" / "Heroine" (1988)	"You're History" (1989)	"Run Silent" (1989)

Music video
- "You're History" on YouTube

"You're History" is a song by British-based pop act Shakespears Sister, released in July 1989 by FFRR Records as the second single from their debut album, Sacred Heart (1989). The song is written by the act with Richard Feldman and Patrick Seymour, and produced by them with Feldman and Jimmy Iovine. It was the first release to present the act as a duo and their first chart hit, reaching number seven in the United Kingdom. Outside the UK, "You're History" reached number five in Finland, peaked at number seven in Luxembourg, and entered the top 40 in Australia, Ireland, and New Zealand. The accompanying music video was directed by Sophie Muller, depicting the act in a glittering vaudeville style.

== Background ==
"You're History" is the first release to present Shakespears Sister as a duo comprising Siobhan Fahey and Marcella Detroit, as opposed to a solo project by Fahey. The single sleeve depicts the two seen from the back with Detroit wielding a guitar; however, an early pressing of the single used an alternate cover depicting only Fahey. Another alternate cover is used for the "Voodoo Remix" single, which is similar to the cover depicting both Fahey and Detroit but features Fahey looking at Detroit instead of straight ahead.

== Critical reception ==
Bill Coleman from Billboard magazine complimented the song's "refreshing hooks", describing it as "danceable pop with a distinctive edge [that] has the goods to seduce programmers with its infectious charm." Alison Mayes from Calgary Herald felt it's a "stellar turn" on the album, and "a witty, infectious statement of female independence that dispenses with a lover by telling him to go back to sleep and comparing him with the Dead Sea scrolls." Robert Hilburn from Los Angeles Times wrote, "Though this kind of novelty wears out quickly, the delightfully absurd put-down of an old lover is too much fun to ignore. Siobhan Fahey is married to Dave Stewart, which may explain some of the Eurythmic tension in the arrangement." David Giles from Music Week said, "Fairly cluttered record built around a wailing bluesy chorus, chugging rhythm and choppy guitar. Tries very hard to be soulful, perhaps too hard." In a 2014 retrospective review, Pop Rescue stated that both singers are on "great vocal form", complimenting the producer of the song, adding, "I think that’s partly why it stands out." A reviewer from Record Mirror named it a "mildly eccentric and compelling mature pop song". Richard Lowe from Smash Hits complimented it as "fab".

== Music video ==
The music video for "You're History", the third video directed by English director Sophie Muller for the group, was the first in which Detroit appeared. The video begins with Detroit singing the opening verse of the song in front of a red stage curtain. At the end of the verse, the curtains open and the video continues in a glittering vaudeville style with Detroit and Fahey superimposed against various backdrops. A variety of dancers (including a group of ballerinas), a court jester juggling act, and various musicians also appear in the video, as does Fahey's son, Sam, dressed in a bumblebee costume. "You're History" was later made available on Shakespears Sister's official YouTube channel in 2019.

== Track listings ==
- 7-inch and cassette single, European mini-CD single
1. "You're History"
2. "Dirty Mind" (live in Leningrad)
- CD single
1. "You're History"
2. "Heroine" (live in Leningrad)
3. "Dirty Mind" (live in Leningrad)
- 12-inch and Japanese mini-CD single
1. "You're History" (maximised version)
2. "Heroine" (live in Leningrad)
3. "Dirty Mind" (live in Leningrad)
- 12-inch "Voodoo Remix" single
1. "You're History" (Voodoo mix)
2. "You're History" (7-inch mix)
3. "Dirty Mind" (live in Leningrad)
- Canadian 12-inch single

A1. "You're History" (Voodoo remix) – 6:31
B1. "You're History" (maximized version) – 6:43
B2. "You're History" (7-inch edit) – 4:28

- US cassette single

A. "You're History" — 4:27
B. "Pretty Boy" — 3:38

== Personnel ==
- Siobhan Fahey – vocals
- Marcella Detroit – vocals, guitars, keyboards
- Stevie Salas – guitar solo
- Alan Moulder – remix
- Jimmy Iovine – production
- Manu Guiot – remix
- Mark McGuire – remix
- Richard Feldman – production

== Charts ==
Chart (1989–1990)	Peak position
Australia (ARIA)	20
Europe (Eurochart Hot 100)	29
Finland (Suomen virallinen lista)	5
Ireland (IRMA)	12
Italy Airplay (Music & Media)	10
Luxembourg (Radio Luxembourg)	7
Netherlands (Single Top 100)	51
New Zealand (Recorded Music NZ)	28
Sweden (Sverigetopplistan)	8
UK Singles (Official Charts)	7
West Germany (GfK)	55

== Release history ==
Region	Date	Format(s)	Label(s)	Ref.
Europe	17 July 1989	7-inch vinyl	FFRR	
Japan	1 September 1989	Mini-CD	London	
