= Siobhan Fahey =

Irish singer (born 1958)

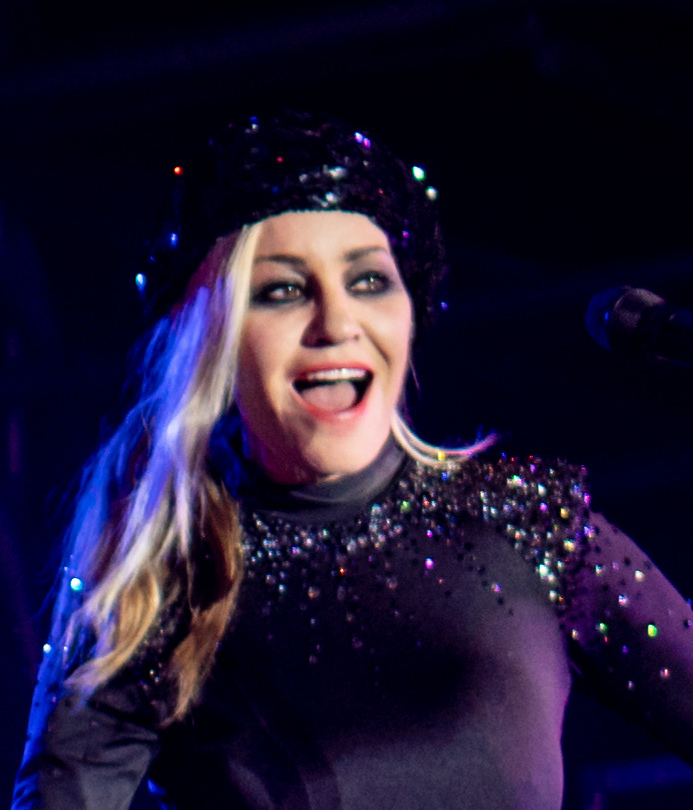
- Fahey performing with Bananarama in 2018

Background information
- Born: Siobhan Maire Deirdre Fahey; 10 September 1958 (age 68); County Meath, Ireland
- Origin: Ireland / England
- Genres: Pop; alternative; new wave; dance-pop; pop rock; synth-pop
- Occupations: Singer; songwriter
- Years active: 1979–present
- Member of: Shakespears Sister
- Formerly of: Bananarama

Siobhan Maire Deirdre Fahey (/ʃəˈvɔːn ˈfɑːhi/; born 10 September 1958) is an Irish singer whose vocal range is a light contralto. She was a founding member of the British girl group Bananarama, who have had ten top-10 hits including the US number one hit single "Venus". She later formed the musical act Shakespears Sister, who had a UK number one hit with the 1992 single "Stay". Fahey joined the other original members of Bananarama for a 2017 UK tour, and, in 2018, a North America and Europe tour.

She is the first Irish-born woman to have written two number one singles on the Irish charts.

== Early life ==
Siobhan Maire Fahey was born on 10 September 1958 in County Meath, Ireland. She has two younger sisters, Maire (who played Eileen in the video of the 1982 song "Come On Eileen", a hit for Dexys Midnight Runners) and Niamh, a producer and editor. Her parents, Helen and Joseph Fahey, both came from County Tipperary, Ireland. Fahey lived in Ireland for several years before her father joined the British Army and the family moved to England, then to Germany for several years, and back to England when Siobhan was nine years old. When she was 14, she and her family moved to Harpenden, Hertfordshire, and, two years later, she left home for London and became involved in the punk scene of the late 1970s. During this period, Fahey was also a regular of the Covent Garden club Blitz, which spawned the New Romantic subculture.

== Career ==
=== Bananarama (1981–1988, 2017–2018) ===
Fahey took a course in fashion journalism at the London College of Fashion, where she met Sara Dallin in 1980. Along with Keren Woodward, they founded Bananarama and recorded their first demo "Aie a Mwana" in 1981. Bananarama then worked with the male vocal trio Fun Boy Three, releasing two top-five singles with them in early 1982 before having their own top-five hit with "Shy Boy" later that year. Fahey, with Dallin and Woodward, co-wrote many of the group's hits, including "Cruel Summer", "Robert De Niro's Waiting...", "I Heard a Rumour", and "Love in the First Degree".

=== Shakespears Sister (1988–1996) ===
In 1988, frustrated with the direction she felt Bananarama was heading, Fahey left the group and formed Shakespears Sister. Initially, Fahey effectively was Shakespears Sister, though American singer/songwriter Marcella Detroit later became an official member, making the outfit a duo. Their 1992 single "Stay" spent eight weeks at number one on the UK Singles Chart and won the 1993 Brit Award for Best British Video. At the 1993 Ivor Novello Awards, Fahey, Detroit, and Dave Stewart received the award for Outstanding Contemporary Song Collection. Fahey often appeared in the band's music videos and on-stage as a vampish glam figure. After two successful albums, tensions began to rise between Fahey and Detroit and they split up in 1993. That year, Fahey admitted herself into a psychiatric unit with severe depression.

In 1996, Fahey continued as Shakespears Sister by herself and released the single "I Can Drive". Intended as the first single from Shakespears Sister's third album and her first record since her split with Marcella Detroit, the single performed disappointingly (UK number 30), which prompted London Records not to release the album. Following this, Fahey left the label and, after a lengthy battle, she finally obtained the rights to release the album (entitled #3) independently through her own website in 2004.

=== Since 1997 ===
Fahey briefly re-joined Bananarama in 1998 to record a cover version of ABBA's "Waterloo" for the Channel 4 Eurovision special A Song for Eurotrash. Fahey reteamed with Bananarama again in 2002 for a "last ever" reunion at the band's 20th-anniversary concert at G-A-Y in London. The trio performed "Venus" and "Waterloo".

Fahey continued to make music into the new millennium. In 2005, Fahey independently released The MGA Sessions, an album recorded with frequent collaborator Sophie Muller in the mid-1990s. Fahey's most recent single (under her own name), "Bad Blood", was released on 17 October 2005.

Fahey's track "Bitter Pill" was partially covered by the pop band The Pussycat Dolls on their 2005 debut album PCD. The verses (which were slightly altered) and the overall sound of the song are from "Bitter Pill", but added in was the chorus of Donna Summer's "Hot Stuff". The song was renamed "Hot Stuff (I Want You Back)" and a remix was included as a B-side to their hit single "Beep".

In 2008, Fahey appeared in the Chris Ward-written and directed short film What Shall We Do with the Drunken Sailor (based on the life of artist/model Nina Hamnett, self-styled "Queen of Bohemia"), with Fahey playing the role of Hamnett opposite actor Clive Arrindel, Donny Tourette (frontman with punk band Towers of London) and Honey Bane (former vocalist of the punk band Fatal Microbes).

In 2009, Fahey decided to resurrect the Shakespears Sister name and released a new album. Entitled Songs from the Red Room, it was released on her own record label, SF Records and included various singles she had released under her own name in recent years. Fahey performed her first live show in almost 15 years as Shakespears Sister in Hoxton, London on 20 November 2009. In 2014 she joined the line-up of Dexys Midnight Runners for some shows, including at Glastonbury Festival.

In 2017, it was announced that Fahey had joined her former Bananarama bandmates for an upcoming UK tour. This was the first live tour Fahey has done as a member of Bananarama.

In 2019, Fahey reunited with Marcella Detroit for Shakespears Sister dates, commencing with an appearance on BBC1's The Graham Norton Show on 10 May 2019.

== Personal life ==
Fahey married Dave Stewart of Eurythmics in 1987; the couple divorced in 1996. They have two sons, Samuel (born 26 November 1987) and Django James (born 1991). The two brothers formed a musical band called Nightmare and the Cat. As an infant, Samuel Stewart appeared in early Shakespears Sister videos for "Heroine" and "You're History". Django Stewart is also an actor. Samuel is currently the guitarist for the American indie rock band Lo Moon.

Prior to her marriage to Stewart, Fahey was romantically involved with Jim Reilly, the drummer for the Northern Irish punk rock band Stiff Little Fingers and Scottish singer Bobby Bluebell of the Bluebells, with whom she co-wrote the UK No. 1 "Young at Heart".

== Discography ==
=== Studio albums ===
Title	Album details
The MGA Sessions	Released: 9 December 2005; Label: SF; Format: CD, digital download

==== With Bananarama ====
- Deep Sea Skiving (1983)
- Bananarama (1984)
- True Confessions (1986)
- Wow! (1987)

==== With Shakespears Sister ====
- Sacred Heart (1989)
- Hormonally Yours (1992)
- #3 (2004)
- Songs from the Red Room (2009)

=== Singles ===
Title	Year	Peak chart positions		Album
Title	Year	UK	UK Indie	Album
"Bitter Pill"^{[a]}	2002	108	27	Songs from the Red Room
"Pulsatron"^{[a]}	2005	95	25	Songs from the Red Room
"Bad Blood"^{[a]}	2005	—	—	Songs from the Red Room
"—" denotes a recording that did not chart or was not released in that territory.

==== As featured artist ====
Title	Year	Peak chart positions	Album
Title	Year	UK	Album
"Walk into the Wind" (Vegas featuring Siobhan Fahey)	1993	65	Vegas
"Fear Is Real" (Psychonauts featuring Siobhan Fahey)	2003	194	Songs for Creatures
"She's Lost Control" (Erreur Fatale featuring Siobhan Fahey)	2004	—	Peep Show
"—" denotes a recording that did not chart or was not released in that territory.

=== Promotional singles ===
Title	Year	Album
"Cold"^{[a]}	2004	Songs from the Red Room

== Notes ==
a Since their inclusion on Songs from the Red Room, an album by Fahey's solo project Shakespears Sister, these songs are now usually credited as 'Shakespears Sister' rather than 'Siobhan Fahey'.
