= Ana Popović discography =

Discography of Serbian blues and blues rock guitarist Ana Popović

- Studio albums: 10
- Live albums: 3

The discography of Ana Popović, a Serbian blues and blues rock guitarist and singer from Belgrade consists of eight solo studio albums, three live solo albums, one studio album done with her father, and one studio album as part of the group Hush. Although born in Serbia, Yugoslavia, Popović now resides in Los Angeles, California in the US.

== Studio albums ==
=== Hush ===
- 1995–1998: Hush is Popović's early band before she went solo.

Year	Details
1998	Hometown: Released: 1998; Label: PGP RTS

=== Solo albums ===
- 2001–present

Year	Details
2001	Hush!: Released: January 22, 2001; Label: Ruf Records
2003	Comfort to the Soul: Released: October 7, 2003; Label: Ruf Records
2007	Still Making History: Released: June 19, 2007; Label: Eclecto Groove Records
2009	Blind for Love: Released: July 21, 2009; Label: Eclecto Groove Records
2011	Unconditional: Released: August 16, 2011; Label: Eclecto Groove Records
2013	Can You Stand the Heat: Released: March 27, 2013; Label: ArtisteXclusive Records
2016	Trilogy: Released: May 20, 2016; Label: ArtisteXclusive Records
2018	Like It on Top: Released: September 14, 2018; Label: ArtisteXclusive Records
2023	Power: Released: May 5, 2023; Label: ArtisteXclusive Records
2025	Dance to the Rhythm: Released: September 26, 2025; Label: Electric Heel Records

=== With Milton Popović ===
- 2015: Ana Popović recorded an album with her father.

Year	Details
2015	Blue Room: Released: May 15, 2015; Label: ArtisteXclusive Records

== Live albums ==
Year	Details
2005	Ana! Live in Amsterdam: Released: July 26, 2005; Label: Ruf Records
2010	An evening at Trasimeno Lake: Released: September 24, 2010; Label: ArtisteXclusive Records
2020	Live for Live: Released: May 2020; Label: ArtisteXclusive Records

== Video releases ==
Year	Details
2005	Ana! Live in Amsterdam: Released: May 31, 2005; Label: Ruf Records
2010	An evening at Trasimeno Lake: Released: September 24, 2010; Label: ArtisteXclusive Records
2020	Live for Live: Released: May 2020; Label: ArtisteXclusive Records

== Hometown album listing ==
Hometown

Studio album by Hush
- Released: 1998
- Recorded: May to August 1998
- Genre: Blues
- Length: 53:22
- Label: PGP RTS (Produkcija gramofonskih ploča Radio-televizije Srbije)
- Producer: Aleksandar Radosavljević

No.	Title	Writer(s)	Length
1.	"Game of Love"	Ike Turner	4:16
2.	"My Hometown"	Ana Popović, Rade Popović	7:05
3.	"Girl of Many Words"	Buddy Guy	3:53
4.	"New York City"	Traditional	4:30
5.	"Neighbor, Neighbor"	Huey P. Meaux	5:09
6.	"Learn to Treat Me Right"	Kim Wilson	3:40
7.	"Grab Your Life"	A. Popović, R. Popović	3:46
8.	"I'm About to Leave You"	A. Popović, R. Popović	3:58
9.	"Breaking Up Someone's Home"	Al Jackson Jr., Timothy Matthews	6:46
10.	"That's Why I Cry"	Sam Maghett	6:30
11.	"Statesboro Blues"	Blind Willie McTell	3:49

=== Personnel ===
Musicians

- Ana Popović – vocals, guitar, guitar (wah), slide guitar
- Rade Popović – guitar, backing vocals
- Milan Sarić – bass
- Bojan Ivković – drums
- Petar Miladinović – harmonica (guest)
- Vojno Dizdar – piano, organ (guest)
- Predrag Krstić – trumpet (guest)

Production

- Aleksandar Radosavljević – production and recording at Studio Akademija, Yugoslavia
- Velja Mijanović – mastering and post-production engineering at VELJAM Studio
- Nikola Vranjković – recording
- Miloš Bičanski – photography
