= Crossroads 2: Live in the Seventies =

Box set by Eric Clapton
- Released: 25 March 1996
- Recorded: May 1974–December 1978
- Genre: Blues rock
- Length: 266:55
- Label: Polydor

Eric Clapton chronology
The Cream of Clapton (1995)	Crossroads 2: Live in the Seventies (1996)	Pilgrim (1998)

Crossroads 2: Live in the Seventies is the seventh live album and a box set by Eric Clapton, released in March 1996. Unlike the first Crossroads box set that encompasses more than three decades of Clapton's work, Crossroads 2 is a chronicle of Clapton's live shows between 1974 through 1978. The album is largely focused on longer renditions of electric blues. Four studio outtakes are also included.

== Track listing ==
=== Disc one ===
1. "Walkin' Down the Road" (Studio outtake) (Paul Levine, Alan Musgrove) – 5:15
  Studio outtake recorded May 1974 at Criteria Studios, Miami for 461 Ocean Boulevard
2. "Have You Ever Loved a Woman" (Billy Myles) – 7:41
  Recorded 19 July 1974 at the Long Beach Arena, Long Beach, California
3. "Willie and the Hand Jive/Get Ready" (Johhny Otis/Eric Clapton, Yvonne Elliman) – 11:42
4. "Can't Find My Way Home" (Steve Winwood) – 5:19
5. "Driftin' Blues/Ramblin' On My Mind" (Johnny Moore, Charles Brown, Eddie Williams/Robert Johnson) – 11:36
6. "Presence of the Lord" (Clapton) – 8:48
  Tracks 3–6 recorded 20 July 1974 at the Long Beach Arena, Long Beach, California
7. "Rambling On My Mind/Have You Ever Loved a Woman" (Johnson/Myles) – 8:16
8. "Little Wing" (Jimi Hendrix) – 6:43
  Tracks 7–8 recorded 4 December 1974 at the Hammersmith Odeon, Hammersmith, London, England
9. "The Sky Is Crying"/"Have You Ever Loved a Woman"/"Rambling on My Mind" (Elmore James/Myles/Johnson) – 7:39
  Recorded 5 December 1974 at the Hammersmith Odeon, Hammersmith, London, England

=== Disc two ===
1. "Layla" (Clapton, Jim Gordon) – 5:38
2. "Further on Up the Road" (Joe Medwick, Don Robey) – 4:31
  Tracks 1–2 recorded 25 June 1975 at the Providence Civic Center. Providence, Rhode Island
3. "I Shot the Sheriff" (Bob Marley) – 10:21
4. "Badge" (Clapton, George Harrison) – 10:42
  Tracks 3–4 recorded 28 June 1975 at the Nassau Coliseum, Uniondale, New York
5. "Driftin' Blues" (Moore, Brown, Williams) – 6:58
6. "Eyesight to the Blind/Why Does Love Got to Be So Sad?" (with guitarist Carlos Santana) (Sonny Boy Williamson/Clapton, Bobby Whitlock) – 24:19
  Tracks 5–6 recorded 25 June 1975 at the Providence Civic Center. Providence, Rhode Island

=== Disc three ===
1. "Tell the Truth" (Clapton, Whitlock) – 8:57
2. "Knockin' on Heaven's Door" (Bob Dylan) – 5:20
3. "Stormy Monday" (T-Bone Walker) – 13:02
  Tracks 1–3 recorded 27 April 1977 at the Hammersmith Odeon, Hammersmith, London, England
4. "Lay Down Sally" (Clapton, Marcy Levy, George Terry) – 5:23
  Recorded 12 February 1978 at the Santa Monica Civic Auditorium, Santa Monica, California
5. "The Core" (Clapton, Levy) – 9:13
  Recorded 11 February 1978 at the Santa Monica Civic Auditorium, Santa Monica, California
6. "We're All the Way" (Don Williams) – 2:55
7. "Cocaine" (J.J. Cale) – 6:37
  Tracks 6–7 recorded 12 February 1978 at the Santa Monica Civic Auditorium, Santa Monica, California
8. "Goin' Down Slow/Ramblin' On My Mind" (St. Louis Jimmy Oden/Johnson) – 13:45
  Recorded 11 February 1978 at the Santa Monica Civic Auditorium, Santa Monica, California
9. "Mean Old Frisco" (Arthur Crudup) – 5:53
  Recorded 21 March 1978 at the Savannah Civic Center, Savannah, Georgia

=== Disc four ===
1. "Loving You Is Sweeter Than Ever" (Ivy Jo Hunter, Stevie Wonder) – 4:23
2. "Worried Life Blues" (Big Maceo Merriweather) – 5:58
  Tracks 1–2, recorded 28 November 1978 at the Victoria Hall, Hanley, Staffordshire, Stoke-on-Trent, England
3. "Tulsa Time" (Danny Flowers) – 4:31
  Recorded 24 November 1978 at the Apollo Theatre, Glasgow, Scotland
4. "Early in the Morning" (Traditional arranged by Eric Clapton) – 6:19
  Recorded 28 November 1978 at the Victoria Hall, Hanley, Staffordshire, Stoke-on-Trent, England
5. "Wonderful Tonight" (Clapton) – 6:24
6. "Kind Hearted Woman" (Johnson) – 5:17
  Tracks 5–6 recorded 24 November 1978 at the Apollo Theatre, Glasgow, Scotland
7. "Double Trouble" (Otis Rush) – 11:06
8. "Crossroads" (Johnson) – 5:20
  Tracks 7–8 recorded 28 November 1978 at the Victoria Hall, Hanley, Staffordshire, Stoke-on-Trent, England
9. "To Make Somebody Happy" (Studio outtake) (Clapton) – 5:11
10. "Cryin'" (Studio outtake) (Clapton) – 2:54
11. "Water on the Ground" (Studio outtake) (Clapton) – 2:59
  Tracks 9–11 are studio recordings, recorded 28 December 1978 at Olympic Studios, Barnes, London, England

== Personnel ==
(adapted from Allmusic.com):

- Andy Knight - EngineerAndy MacPherson - Mixing, Producer
- Armando Peraza - Percussion
- Bill Brovas - Engineer
- Bill Levenson - Compilation Producer
- Bob Potter - Engineer
- Brian Engolds - Engineer
- Carl Radle - Bass
- Carlos Santana - Guest Artist, Guitar
- Catherine Ladis - Project Assistant
- Chuck Boyd - Photography
- Dave Markee - Bass
- David Hewitt - Engineer
- David Redfern - Photography
- Dennis Mays - Engineer
- Dick Sims - Keyboards
- Ed Barton - Engineer
- Eric Clapton - Arranger, Composer, Guitar, Primary Artist, Vocals
- Faye Haulkhory - Project Assistant
- Fin Costello - Photography
- George Terry - Composer, Guitar
- Gered Mankowitz - Photography
- Glyn Johns - Engineer, Producer
- Graham Lyle- Guitar
- Henry Spinetti - Drums
- Jack Crymes - Engineer
- Jackie Stansfield - Project Coordinator
- Jamie Oldaker - Drums
- Jay Mark - Mixing
- Jerry Rappaport - Assistant Producer
- Jim Gehr - Engineer
- Jon Astley - Engineer, Mixing, Producer
- Joseph M. - Palmaccio Mastering
- Karl Richardson - Engineer
- Leon "Ndugu" Chancler - Percussion
- Marcy Levy - Composer, Harmonica, Vocals (Background)
- Michael Putland - Photography
- Paul Sandweiss - Engineer
- Ralph Moss - Engineer
- Ray Thompson - Engineer
- Richard Aaron - Photography
- Ron Fawcus - Engineer
- Sergio Pastora - Percussion
- Steve Morley - Photography
- Terri Tierney - Project Coordinator
- Tom Dowd - Producer
- Yvonne Elliman - Composer, Guest Artist, Vocals (Background)
