= Slowhand =

Studio album by Eric Clapton
- Released: 25 November 1977
- Recorded: May 1977
- Studios: Olympic, London
- Genres: Rock; blues; country
- Length: 39:06
- Label: RSO
- Producer: Glyn Johns

Eric Clapton chronology
No Reason to Cry (1976)	Slowhand (1977)	Backless (1978)

Singles from Slowhand
- 1. "Lay Down Sally" Released: 11 November 1977; 2. "Wonderful Tonight" Released: 10 March 1978

Slowhand is the fifth solo studio album by Eric Clapton. Released on 25 November 1977 by RSO Records, and titled after Clapton's nickname, it is one of his most commercially and critically successful studio albums. Slowhand produced the two hit singles "Lay Down Sally" and "Wonderful Tonight", reached various international music charts and was honoured with numerous awards and recording certifications. In 2012, a deluxe edition was released to celebrate the album's 35th anniversary.

== Recording ==
Clapton wanted to work with record producer Glyn Johns as he thought Johns had produced great work with famous groups like the Rolling Stones and Eagles and understood how to work with both British and American musicians. While in the studio with Johns, Clapton noted that the A-list producer was very disciplined and disliked jamming because it would kill important recording time. Although Clapton and his band were intoxicated nearly all the time when recording, Johns liked Clapton's work and brought out the best in every musician, according to Clapton.

== Title and artwork ==
The album was titled after Clapton's nickname, which was given to him by Giorgio Gomelsky. In his 2007 autobiography, Clapton recalled that the name "Slowhand" seemed to be hanging on to his real name, because it seemed to be well received by both his American friends and fans who think of the Wild West when hearing the nickname.

The album's artwork is by Clapton with the help of Pattie Boyd and Dave Stewart, credited as "El & Nell Ink". Besides choosing various photos for the inner side of the gramophone record packaging, there are two pictures, Clapton notes, which have deeper importance to him: one in which he kisses Boyd, and another showing a destroyed Ferrari 365 GT4 BB, which Clapton had bought after seeing George Harrison with the same model at his Hurtwood Edge Estate. Clapton had crashed the car, and nearly died, after finishing a tour of Australia.

== Release and reception ==
Professional ratings
Retrospective reviews
Review scores
Source	Rating
AllMusic	4.5/5 stars
Chicago Tribune	2.5/4 stars
Christgau's Record Guide	C+
The Encyclopedia of Popular Music	4/5 stars
Music Story	4.5/5 stars
The New York Times	(favourable)
The Rolling Stone Album Guide	5/5 stars

Slowhand was released on 25 November 1977 by RSO Records. In a contemporary review for Rolling Stone, John Swenson found Clapton's playing more subtle than before but his songs sobering and interesting psychologically, especially "Next Time You See Her", as they showed him "in touch with the horrible moral power and long-suffering self-righteousness that is the essence of the blues". Robert Christgau was less enthusiastic, feeling Clapton had regressed as a singer, "sounding like he's blown his voice. Doing what, I wonder."

In a retrospective review for AllMusic, Stephen Thomas Erlewine wrote that the confident, virtuosic quality in the band's playing and the diversity of the songwriting made Slowhand "rank with 461 Ocean Boulevard as Eric Clapton's best albums". Yahoo! Music's Dave DiMartino said the record was full of hits and "tasteful" music. In 2003, Slowhand was ranked number 325 on Rolling Stone's list of The 500 Greatest Albums of All Time, and again in 2012.

=== Deluxe Edition ===
In November 2012, a remastered two-compact-disc 35th anniversary deluxe edition of Slowhand was released. The first disc consists of the remastered album with additional bonus tracks, outtakes and studio jam sessions. The second disc features a previously unreleased live concert, recorded in April 1977 at the Hammersmith Odeon; although the concert is of the same era as the Slowhand sessions, it was performed prior to the album's recording and release, and so does not include any of the album's tracks.

== Track listings ==
Side one
No.	Title	Writer(s)	Length
1.	"Cocaine"	J. J. Cale	3:41
2.	"Wonderful Tonight"	Eric Clapton	3:41
3.	"Lay Down Sally"	Clapton · Marcy Levy · George Terry	3:56
4.	"Next Time You See Her"	Clapton	4:01
5.	"We're All the Way"	Don Williams	2:32

Side two
No.	Title	Writer(s)	Length
1.	"The Core"	Clapton · Marcy Levy	8:45
2.	"May You Never"	John Martyn	3:01
3.	"Mean Old Frisco"	Arthur Crudup	4:42
4.	"Peaches and Diesel"	Clapton · Albhy Galuten	4:46
Total length:			39:06

== Personnel ==
- Eric Clapton – lead vocals, guitars
- Dick Sims – keyboards
- Marcy Levy – harmony and backing vocals, co-lead vocals on "The Core"
- Carl Radle – bass
- Yvonne Elliman – harmony and backing vocals
- George Terry – guitars
- Jamie Oldaker – drums, percussion
- Mel Collins – saxophone on "The Core"

== Production ==
- Glyn Johns – producer, engineer
- El & Nell Ink. (David Stewart, Nello) – art direction and design
- Jonathan Dent – artwork
- Andy Seymour – inner sleeve photography
- Watal Asanuma – outer sleeve photography

== Charts ==
Chart (1977–1978)	Peak position
Australian Albums (Kent Music Report)	46
Canada Top Albums/CDs (RPM)	2
Dutch Albums (Album Top 100)	17
Japanese Albums (Oricon)	35
New Zealand Albums (RMNZ)	32
Norwegian Albums (VG-lista)	5
Swedish Albums (Sverigetopplistan)	41
UK Albums (Official Charts)	23
US Billboard 200	2

Chart (2012–2013)	Peak position
Belgian Albums (Ultratop Flanders)	130
Belgian Albums (Ultratop Wallonia)	89
Croatian International Albums (HDU)	20
German Albums (Offizielle Top 100)	66
US Top Catalog Albums (Billboard)	48

Chart (2025)	Peak position
Greek Albums (IFPI)	29
US Top Blues Albums (Billboard)	1

== Certifications ==
Region	Certification	Certified units/sales
Canada (Music Canada)	2× Platinum	200,000^{^}
Switzerland (IFPI Switzerland)	Gold	25,000^{^}
United Kingdom (BPI)	Gold	100,000^{^}
United States (RIAA)	3× Platinum	3,000,000^{^}
^{^} Shipments figures based on certification alone.
