= Comfort to the Soul =

Studio album by Ana Popović
- Released: October 7, 2003
- Genres: Blues, rock, soul, jazz
- Length: 43:12
- Label: Ruf
- Producers: Jim Gaines, David Z

Ana Popović chronology
Hush! (2001)	Comfort to the Soul (2003)	Ana! Live in Amsterdam (2005)

Professional ratings
Review scores
Source	Rating
AllMusic	4/5 stars
The Penguin Guide to Blues Recordings	1.5/4 stars

Comfort to the Soul is Ana Popović's second studio album, released on October 7, 2003, on Ruf. The album was recorded in Memphis and produced by Jim Gaines. The album consists of five songs by Popović and six covers, showcasing not just the well-known blues artists (Howlin' Wolf), but lesser known performers (Susan Marshall), and even rock songs that work well in the blues environment (Steely Dan's "Night by Night"). Popović introduced some jazz elements into Comfort to the Soul, and the album won a jazz award in France, 'Jazz a Juan-Revelation 2004'. She surrounded herself with seasoned musicians (such as Reese Wynans who had played with Stevie Ray Vaughan as part of Double Trouble) as a statement that she was a blues player to be reckoned with.

== Track list ==
No.	Title	Writer(s)	Length
1.	"Don't Bear Down on Me (I'm Here to Steal the Show)"	Ana Popović, Todd Sharpville	3:55
2.	"Love Me Again"	Susan Marshall, Mike Carroll	5:10
3.	"Comfort to the Soul"	A. Popović	3:28
4.	"Change My Mind"	Jeff Silbar, Glen Clark	4:30
5.	"Sittin' on Top of the World"	Chester "Howlin' Wolf" Burnett	3:48
6.	"Night by Night"	Walter Becker, Donald Fagen	3:36
7.	"Navajo Moon"	A. Popović	4:47
8.	"Need All the Help I Can Get"	Delbert McClinton, Gary Nicholson	2:50
9.	"Recall the Days"	A. Popović	3:45
10.	"Fool Proof"	Tom Hambridge, Shannon Curfman	3:24
11.	"Jaco"	A. Popović, Pat Metheny	3:59

== Personnel ==
Musicians

- Ana Popović – vocals, guitar, rhythm guitar, slide guitar
- Jack Holder – guitar, rhythm guitar
- Dave Smith – bass
- Susan Marshall – background vocals (tracks 2, 3, 6 & 10)
- Becky Russell – background vocals (track 3, 6 & 10)
- Steve Potts – drums
- Reese Wynans – Hammond (tracks 3, 6 & 9)
- Al Gamble – Hammond, keys (track 2)
- Lyn Jones – harmonica (tracks 8 & 10)

Production

- Jim Gaines – production (tracks 1, 2, 5, 7 & 10)
- David Z – production (tracks 3, 4, 6, 8, 9 & 11) and mixing
- Karsten Fuchs – mastering at Brühl Studios Weimar, photography
- Michael van Merwyk – artwork
