= No Reason to Cry =

Studio album by Eric Clapton
- Released: 27 August 1976
- Recorded: December 1975 – May 1976
- Studios: Shangri-La (Malibu, California); Village Recorder (Los Angeles, California)
- Genres: Rock; blues
- Length: 45:59
- Label: RSO
- Producers: Eric Clapton, Rob Fraboni, Carl Radle

Eric Clapton chronology
E. C. Was Here (1975)	No Reason to Cry (1976)	Slowhand (1977)

Singles from No Reason to Cry
- 1. "Hello Old Friend" Released: October 1976; 2. "Carnival" Released: January 1977

No Reason to Cry is the fourth solo studio album by Eric Clapton, released by RSO Records on 27 August 1976. The album was recorded in Malibu and Los Angeles between December 1975 to May 1976. The record went silver in the U.K.

== Recording ==
The album was recorded at The Band's Shangri-la Studios in March 1976, and included involvement from all five members of The Band; Rick Danko shared vocals with Clapton on "All Our Past Times", which he co-wrote with Clapton. The album also includes a duet with Bob Dylan on his otherwise unreleased song "Sign Language". The booklet in Bob Dylan's box set The Bootleg Series Volumes 1–3 (Rare & Unreleased) 1961–1991 describes his involvement in this album: "Dylan dropped by and was just hanging out, living in a tent at the bottom of the garden. He would sneak into the studio to see what was going on." Dylan offered his new, unrecorded song "Seven Days" to Clapton. Clapton passed on it, but Ron Wood took him up on the offer and released it on his third solo album Gimme Some Neck. The song "Innocent Times" is sung by Marcy Levy, who also shared vocals with Clapton on "Hungry". In the bonus track "Last Night", added in the 1990 re-release, Clapton shares vocals with Richard Manuel.

== Chart performance ==
No Reason to Cry is one of Clapton's most internationally successful albums from the 1970s. The release reached the Top 30 in seven national music album charts, hitting Top 10 in United Kingdom (peaking at No. 8) and in the Netherlands, where it topped out No. 9. The album was certified silver in the United Kingdom. In Norway and the United States, the album charted at No. 13 and No. 15 respectively, while in New Zealand and Sweden, it reached No. 18 and No. 24 respectively.

== Critical reception ==
Professional ratings
Review scores
Source	Rating
AllMusic	3.5/5 stars
Christgau's Record Guide	B−

AllMusic critic William Ruhlmann awarded the release 3.5 of five possible stars, writing: "No Reason to Cry is identifiable as the kind of pop/rock Clapton had been making since the start of his solo career", adding "the most memorable music on the album occurs when Clapton is collaborating with members of the Band and other guests". Finishing his review, Ruhlmann called the release "a good purchase for fans of Bob Dylan and the Band, but not necessarily for those of Eric Clapton". Rolling Stone journalist Dave Marsh finds, the album recordings are "much more mélange than masterpiece". Robert Christgau rated the album with a "B−" and calls the album "a well-made, rather likable rock and roll LP", noting the "singing is eloquent and the instrumental signature an almost irresistible pleasure".

== Track listing ==
Side one
No.	Title	Writer(s)	Length
1.	"Beautiful Thing"	Richard Manuel, Rick Danko	4:24
2.	"Carnival"	Eric Clapton	3:41
3.	"Sign Language"	Bob Dylan	2:57
4.	"County Jail Blues"	Alfred Fields, arranged by Clapton	3:58
5.	"All Our Past Times"	Clapton, Danko	4:36

Side two
No.	Title	Writer(s)	Length
6.	"Hello Old Friend"	Clapton	3:36
7.	"Double Trouble"	Otis Rush; arranged by Clapton	4:23
8.	"Innocent Times"	Clapton, Marcy Levy	4:11
9.	"Hungry"	Levy, Dicky Simms	4:39
10.	"Black Summer Rain"	Clapton	4:55

Bonus track (CD reissues)
No.	Title	Writer(s)	Length
11.	"Last Night"	Walter Jacobs	4:52
Total length:			50:51

== Personnel ==
The listed personnel was taken from the album's liner notes. The back cover also thanks additional people, who worked on the album, without specifying what their contribution was.

- Bob Dylan – guitar and more on "Sign Language"
- Ron Wood – guitar on "Beautiful Thing", "Sign Language", "County Jail Blues" and "All Our Past Times"
- Rick Danko – bass
- Richard Manuel – piano
- Robbie Robertson – guitar
- Georgie Fame – keyboards
- Ed Anderson
- Aggie
- Brains Bradley
- Jesse Ed Davis
- Terry Danko
- Bob Ellis
- Connie
- Konrad Kramer
- Yvonne Elliman
- Geoffrey Harrison(George Harrison)
- Levon Helm
- Garth Hudson
- Marcy Levy
- Nello
- Jamie Oldaker – drums
- Albhy Galuten
- Dick Simms
- Nat Jeffery
- Ralph Moss
- Dick La Palm
- Dread Lever
- Billy Preston
- Chris Jagger (vocals)
- Carl Radle
- Sergio Pastora Rodriguez
- Wilton Spears
- Dominic Lumetta
- Sandy Castle
- George Terry
- Rob Fraboni
- Larry Samuals
- Mick Turner
- Wah Wah Watson
- Pete & All at Shangri-La

== Charts ==
=== Weekly charts ===
Chart performance for No Reason to Cry
Chart (1976–1977)	Peak position
Australian Albums (Kent Music Report)	15
Canada Top Albums/CDs (RPM)	25
Danish Albums (Hitlisten)	3
Dutch Albums (Album Top 100)	9
Finnish Albums (Suomen virallinen lista)	23
Japanese Albums (Oricon)	11
New Zealand Albums (RMNZ)	18
Norwegian Albums (VG-lista)	13
Swedish Albums (Sverigetopplistan)	24
UK Albums (Official Charts)	8
US Billboard 200	15

Chart (2026)	Peak position
Greek Albums (IFPI)	43

=== Year-end charts ===
Year-end chart performance for No Reason to Cry
Chart (1976)	Position
Australian Albums (Kent Music Report)	98
Japanese Albums (Oricon)	76

== Certifications and sales ==
Certifications and sales for No Reason to Cry
Region	Certification	Certified units/sales
Australia (ARIA)	Gold	20,000^{^}
Japan	—	35,000
United Kingdom (BPI)	Silver	60,000^{^}
United States	—	350,000
^{^} Shipments figures based on certification alone.
