= The Core (song) =

1977 song by Eric Clapton

Song by Eric Clapton

from the album Slowhand
- Released: November 25, 1977
- Length: 8:45
- Label: RSO
- Songwriters: Eric Clapton, Marcy Levy
- Producer: Glyn Johns

"The Core" is a song written by Eric Clapton and Marcy Levy that was first released on Clapton's 1977 album Slowhand.

== Music and lyrics ==
"The Core" is a long up-tempo song, clocking in at nearly 9 minutes long. Clapton and Levy sing the vocals as a duet. It is propelled by a "driving" guitar riff and includes a saxophone solo played by Mel Collins. Something Else! critic S. Victor Aaron described the riff as "gritty". Rolling Stone critic John Swenson described the song as having a "boogie rhythm reminiscent of Derek and the Dominoes." Potomac News critic Bren Bailey said that the song "allows Clapton and his band to explore just about every vocal and instrumental blues experience known to man, and then some."

The lyrics of "The Core" are about "self-motivation in times of difficulty" and is one of several Clapton songs that convey a message of faith. Music hournalist Andrew Gerdner called out the line "I can burn without fuel" as providing an image of empowerment. He also felt that the line "You are young and you are free, but damned if you're deceased in your own lifetime" is "a message of encouragement for hard times reminding you not to take life for granted." On the other hand, The Morning Call critic Len Righi described the lyrics as "throwaway".

== Reception ==
Globe and Mail critic Brad Wheeler praised "The Core" as the "freshest thing" on Slowhand and as the album's "biggest, boogiest cut", with "solos (guitar and saxophone) flying crossfire-hurricane wild." He also praised Levy's singing and the organ playing. Tulsa World critic Vern Stefanic described "The Core" as a hard driving number" that couild become a rock music classic in the "Layla" vein. Swenson described the song as "powerhouse Clapton caught in a glimpse of white hot frenzy." Swenson particularly praised Collins' "searing" saxophone break and Clapton's "lightning" guitar solo, which he claimed "sounds more like his classic run on 'Crossroads' than anything he's done since. Aaron praised Clapton's guitar playing and his interplay with Collins' saxophone. He concluded that "riffed-based jamming so often goes nowhere, but 'The Core' is jamming with soul and purpose." Music critic Marc Robery also praised Clapton's guitar and the interplay with Collins' saxophone, as well as Levy's vocal performance. Robery concluded that "The whole band cooks on this one." St. Joseph News-Press critic Terry Jordan said that "Clapton gets his point across with mesmerizing riffs, yet never lets the performance get out of hand." Gardner praised the "recognizable" riff. On the other hand, Muskegon Chronicle writer Nancy Kuharevicz found the song "tiresome" due to its length.

A live version of "The Core" was included on Clapton's live album Crossroads 2: Live in the Seventies.

== Cover versions ==
"The Core" was covered by Shannon Curfman (in a duet with Joe Bonamassa) on her 2010 album What You're Getting Into.
