= Hush! (Ana Popović album) =

Studio album by Ana Popović
- Released: January 22, 2001
- Recorded: October and November, 2000
- Genre: Blues
- Length: 53:50
- Label: Ruf
- Producer: Jim Gaines

Ana Popović chronology
Hush! (2001)	Comfort to the Soul (2003)

Professional ratings
Review scores
Source	Rating
The Penguin Guide to Blues Recordings	2/4 stars
AllMusic	4/5 stars

Hush! is Ana Popović's debut solo studio album, released on January 22, 2001 on Ruf Records. While studying at Utrecht Conservatory of Music in the Netherlands, she formed the Ana Popović Band to pay tuition costs. The band became popular in the Dutch and German music scenes, which brought her a record deal with Ruf Records, and brought her to Memphis in 2000 to record Hush!, named after her first band in Serbia, Hush. One track on the album, "Bring Your Fine Self Home", features a duet with Bernard Allison, son of blues great Luther Allison.

== Track list ==
No.	Title	Writer(s)	Length
1.	"Love Fever"	Kevin Bowe, Kostas	4:29
2.	"Mended"	Ana Popović, Rob Geboers, Ronald Oor, Sandy Carroll	4:23
3.	"Hometown"	A. Popović, Rade Popović	7:09
4.	"I Won't Let You Down"	A. Popović, R. Geboers, R. Oor	4:22
5.	"The Hustle Is On"	H.E. Owens	2:43
6.	"Downtown"	Tom Waits	4:24
7.	"How Lonely Can a Woman Get"	A. Popović, Bart Kamp, R. Geboers, R. Oor	3:59
8.	"Walk Away"	A. Popović, B. Kamp, R. Geboers, R. Oor, S. Carroll	3:22
9.	"Girl of Many Words"	Buddy Guy	3:54
10.	"Minute 'Till Dawn"	A. Popović, S. Carroll	5:14
11.	"Bring Your Fine Self Home" (Duet with Bernard Allison)	Johnny Copeland	5:12
12.	"How the Mighty Have Fallen"	William Lee Ellis, Susan Marshall	4:39

== Personnel ==
Musicians

- Ana Popović – vocals, guitar, rhythm guitar, slide guitar
- Jack Holder – guitar, rhythm guitar
- William Lee Ellis – acoustic guitar
- Dave Smith – bass
- Bernard Allison – vocals (track 11)
- Jacqueline Johnson – background vocals
- Steve Mergen – drums
- Steve Potts – drums
- Sam Shoup – upright bass
- Jim Spake – saxophone
- Scott Thompson – trumpet
- Ernest Williamson – organ, piano

Production

- Jim Gaines – production and mixing in Memphis
- Brad Blackwood – mastering
- John Hampton – mixing
- Dawn Hopkins – engineering
