= What You're Getting Into =

Studio album by Shannon Curfman
- Released: February 9, 2010
- Genre: Blues-rock
- Length: 40:58
- Label: Purdy

Shannon Curfman chronology
Fast Lane Addiction (2007)	What You're Getting Into (2010)

Professional ratings
Review scores
Source	Rating
Type 3 Media	7.0/10 stars

What You're Getting Into is Shannon Curfman's third full-length album.

== Track listing ==
1. "What You’re Getting Into" – 3:25
2. "Free Your Mind" – 3:04
3. "The Core" (Duet with Joe Bonamassa) (Eric Clapton/Marcy Levy) – 6:21
4. "Heaven Is In Your Mind" – 3:28
5. "All I Have" – 3:54
6. "Curious" – 3:36
7. "Oh Well" (Peter Green) – 5:10
8. "What Would Mama Say" – 3:26
9. "Dragon Attack" (Brian May) – 3:37
10. "Strange" – 4:53

== Charts ==
Album – Billboard (North America)

Year	Chart	Position
2010	Blues Albums	7

== Personnel ==
- Shannon Curfman – vocals, guitar, producer
- Wade Thompson – bass
- Justin Kesterson – guitar
- Paul Robert Thompson – drums, percussion
- Anthony Krizan – guitar
- Paul Mayasich – guitar
- Joe Bonamassa – guitar and vocals on track 3
- Stevie D. – guitar
- Lucy Curfman – background vocals
- Jason Miller – guitar, percussion, programming, producer, engineer, mixing
- Nels Urtel – background vocals
- Greg Reierson – mastering
- Dave Niemela – album design
- Erin Zemanovic – photography
- Ross Harvey – assistant engineer
- Jay Sandstorm – assistant engineer
- Steve Severson – assistant engineer
- James Davis – assistant engineer
- Alex DeYoung – assistant engineer
- Stuart Brantley – audio engineering
