= Fast Lane Addiction =

Album by Shannon Curfman

Studio album by Shannon Curfman
- Released: October 9, 2007
- Genre: Blues-rock
- Length: 48:33
- Label: Purdy

Shannon Curfman chronology
Take It Like a Man (2006)	Fast Lane Addiction (2007)	What You're Getting Into (2010)

Professional ratings
Review scores
Source	Rating
Type 3 Media	8/10 stars

Fast Lane Addiction is Shannon Curfman's second full-length album.

== Track listing ==
1. "Fast Lane Addiction" (Colett, Conklin, Krizan) - 2:59
2. "Do Me" (Shannon Curfman, Young) - 3:39
3. "Little Things" (Curfman, Grosse, Young) - 3:26
4. "Square In A Circle" (Curfman, DeLeo, DeLeo, Young) - 4:19
5. "Can't Let You Go" (Curfman, Jameson) - 3:30
6. "Why" (Curfman, Krizan, Young) - 3:51
7. "Tangled" (Curfman, Young) - 4:01
8. "Another" (Curfman, Young) - 3:18
9. "Stone Cold Bitch" - 3:48
10. "Sex Type Thing" - 4:06
11. "I Can't Wait To Miss You" (Angelo, Curfman) - 4:30

== Charts ==
Album - Billboard (North America)

Year	Chart	Position
2007	Top Blues Albums	8

== Personnel ==
- Shannon Curfman - vocals, guitar
- Jimmy Bones - keyboards
- Eric Hoegemeyer - drums
- Aaron Julison - bass
- Marlon Young - bass, guitar

== Production ==
- Al Sutton - producer, engineer
- Marlon Young - producer
- Jason Miller - engineer, editing, mixing
- Dan Curry - engineer
- Eric Hoegemeyer - programming, producer, engineer, mixing
- Greg Reierson - mastering
