= Hello Old Friend =

Single by Eric Clapton

from the album No Reason to Cry
- B-side: "All Our Past Times"
- Released: October 1976
- Genre: Country rock
- Length: 3:34
- Label: RSO
- Songwriter(s): Eric Clapton
- Producer(s): Rob Fraboni

Eric Clapton singles chronology
"Knockin' on Heaven's Door" (1975)	"Hello Old Friend" (1976)	"Carnival" (1977)

"Hello Old Friend" is a country rock song, written and recorded by the British rock musician Eric Clapton. The track was released in October 1976 as the first of two singles from Clapton's 1976 studio album entitled No Reason to Cry.

== Chart performance ==
The song reached position 54 on the ARIA Charts in Australia, compiled by the historian David Kent. In Canada, the released peaked on position 37, making it Clapton's fourth solo career single to reach the Top 40 in the country. Placing itself at number 24 on the Billboard Hot 100 in the United States, the single was Clapton's third mid-successful single to reach the Top 40 in North America.

== Critical reception ==
For his album review of No Reason to Cry, the AllMusic critic William Ruhlmann notes, "Hello Old Friend" is the best pop/rock song on the album. He goes on describe the title as a "identifiable" Clapton piece of music. Rolling Stone journalist Dave Marsh called the song "a whimsical and silly slice of attempted innocence". Billboard said that it has a reggae feel similar to that of "I Shot the Sheriff." Record World called it "a midtempo number constructed around a network of acoustic and slide guitars."

== Chart positions ==
=== Weekly charts ===
Chart (1976–1977)	Peak position
Australia (Kent Music Report)	54
Canadian Top Singles (RPM)	37
US Billboard Hot 100	24
