= An evening at Trasimeno Lake =

2010 concert and video album by Ana Popovic

Video by Ana Popović
- Released: September 1, 2010
- Recorded: 2009
- Genre: Electric blues, blues rock, jazz
- Length: 1:25:00
- Label: ArtisteXclusive records
- Director: Simone Pucci
- Producer: Mark van Meurs

Ana Popović chronology
Ana! Live in Amsterdam (2005)	An evening at Trasimeno Lake (2010)	Live for Live (2020)

An evening at Trasimeno Lake is Ana Popović's second concert video and live album, with the video released on September 1, 2010, and the album released on September 24, 2010. The album and video mark her first use of the label ArtisteXclusive records. The concert was Popović's second time playing at the Trasimeno Lake Blues Festival, an amphitheater stage with a back drop of a mediaeval castle, Rocca Medievale. The video showcases her musical talents and also focuses on the rhythm section who accompanied Popović, plus has some scattered side vignettes of her walking around the castle before the show to add color. The video also includes an interview with Popović where she talks about balancing her career and her family. In addition to her regular backing band of bassist Ronald Jonker, keyboarder Michele Papadia, and drummer Andrew "Blaze" Thomas, Popović added additional percussion by Stéphane Avellaneda, some brass with Cristiano Arcelli on saxophone and Riccardo Giulietti on trumpet, and some backing vocals by Sandra LaVille.

== Video track list ==
No.	Title	Writer(s)	Length
1.	"Wrong Woman"	Ana Popović	5:01
2.	"Is This Everything There Is?"	A. Popović, Mark van Meurs	4:03
3.	"How'd You Learn to Shake It Like That"	James Edward Pryor	5:27
4.	"Shadows After Dark"	A. Popović	4:09
5.	"Lives That Don't Exist"	A. Popović, M. van Meurs	3:17
6.	"Let Me Love You Babe"	Willie Dixon	8:02
7.	"Doubt Everyone But Me"	A. Popović	4:38
8.	"Blind for Love"	A. Popović	3:13
9.	"Get Back Home to You"	A. Popović	3:30
10.	"Love Fever"	Kevin Bowe, Kostas	5:23
11.	"Hold On"	A. Popović, M. van Meurs, Rudie van Meurs	7:48
12.	"Blind for Love" (Bonus: Acoustic afternoon session)	A. Popović
13.	"Steal Me Away" (Bonus: Acoustic afternoon session)	A. Popović
14.	"Bonus: Full Interview"

== Video personnel ==
Musicians

- Ana Popović – vocals, guitar, slide guitar
- Ronald Jonker – bass, backing vocals
- Michele Papadia – keys, backing vocals
- Andrew "Blaze" Thomas – drums
- Stéphane Avellaneda – percussion
- Cristiano Arcelli – saxophone
- Riccardo Giulietti – trumpet
- Sandra LaVille – backing vocals

Production

- Simone Pucci - director
- Mark van Meurs - producer
- Henk van Engen - editor
- Mark Dearnley - mixing and engineering
- Recorded live in 2009 in Trasimeno Lake, Italy

An evening at Trasimeno Lake

Live album by Ana Popović
- Released: September 24, 2010
- Recorded: 2009
- Genre: Electric blues, blues rock, jazz
- Length: 54:31
- Label: ArtisteXclusive records
- Producer: Mark van Meurs

Ana Popović chronology
Blind for Love (2009)	An evening at Trasimeno Lake (2010)	Unconditional (2011)

== Album track list ==
No.	Title	Writer(s)	Length
1.	"Wrong Woman"	Ana Popović	5:01
2.	"Is This Everything There Is?"	A. Popović, Mark van Meurs	4:03
3.	"How'd You Learn to Shake It Like That"	James Edward Pryor	5:27
4.	"Shadows After Dark"	A. Popović	4:09
5.	"Lives That Don't Exist"	A. Popović, M. van Meurs	3:17
6.	"Let Me Love You Babe"	Willie Dixon	8:02
7.	"Doubt Everyone But Me"	A. Popović	4:38
8.	"Blind for Love"	A. Popović	3:13
9.	"Get Back Home to You"	A. Popović	3:30
10.	"Love Fever"	Kevin Bowe, Kostas	5:23
11.	"Hold On"	A. Popović, M. van Meurs, Rudie van Meurs	7:48

== Album personnel ==
Musicians

- Ana Popović – vocals, guitar, slide guitar
- Ronald Jonker – bass, backing vocals
- Michele Papadia – keys, backing vocals
- Andrew "Blaze" Thomas – drums
- Stéphane Avellaneda – percussion
- Cristiano Arcelli – saxophone
- Riccardo Giulietti – trumpet
- Sandra LaVille – backing vocals

Production

- Mark van Meurs - producer
- Henk van Engen - editor
- Mark Dearnley - mixing and engineering
- Recorded live in 2009 in Trasimeno Lake, Italy
