= Live for Live =

2020 live album by Ana Popović

Video by Ana Popović
- Released: May 15, 2020
- Recorded: November 2, 2019
- Genre: Electric blues, funk, soul
- Length: 1:31:49
- Label: ArtisteXclusive records, Ana Popovic Music
- Director: Pascal Guilly, Hervé Pépion

Ana Popović chronology
An evening at Trasimeno Lake (2010)	Live for Live (2020)

Live for Live is Ana Popović's third concert video and live album, recorded during the Festival de Guitares d'Issoudun in Issoudun, France, at the Centre Culturel Albert Camus on November 2, 2019 and released on May 15, 2020. Popović's touring band of consisted of bassist Buthel, keyboarder Michele Papadia, drummer Jerry Kelley, saxophonist Claudio Giovagnoli, and trumpeter Davide Ghidoni

== Video track list ==
No.	Title	Writer(s)	Length
1.	"Intro / Ana's Shuffle"	Ana Popović, Tony Coleman	6:02
2.	"Can You Stand the Heat"	A. Popović	3:32
3.	"Object of Obesession"	A. Popović, John Williams	4:02
4.	"Love You Tonight"	A. Popović	5:41
5.	"Train"	A. Popović	5:45
6.	"Long Road Down"	A. Popović	5:11
7.	"New Coat of Paint"	Tom Waits	5:31
8.	"Johnnie Ray"	A. Popović, Kevin Bowe	9:03
9.	"Can't You See What You're Doing to Me"	Roy Turk, Fred E. Ahlert	5:47
10.	"Fencewalk"	Carlos Wilson, Louis Wilson, Ric Wilson, Skip Scarborough	4:54
11.	"If Tomorrow Was Today"	A. Popović	4:19
12.	"Brand New Man"	A. Popović, Kevin Moore	3:33
13.	"Like It on Top"	A. Popović, K. Moore	3:47
14.	"Lasting Kind of Love"	A. Popović, K. Moore	3:52
15.	"Mo' Better Love"	A. Popović, Tommy L. Sims	4:35
16.	"How'd You Learn to Shake It Like That"	James Edward Pryor	6:47
17.	"Tribe"	A. Popović, T. Coleman	9:28

== Video personnel ==
Musicians

- Ana Popović – vocals, guitar
- Buthel Burns – bass, backing vocals
- Michele Papadia – keys
- Jerry Kelley – drums, backing vocals
- Claudio Giovagnoli – saxophone
- Davide Ghidoni – trumpet

Video production by Cap 7 Media

- Pascal Guilly - live director
- Philippe Lecomte - vision engineer, equipment manager
- Philippe Laurent - technical assistant
- Olivier Thillou - sound engineer
- Rémi Legay - motorized camera operator
- Jérome Beauvarlet - camera operator 1
- Damien Claite - camera operator 2
- Alexandre Barre - camera operator
- Clément Lelong - crane operator

Technical team of the Centre Culturel Albert Camus

- Hervé Pépion - director
- Christophe Canon - technical director, lighting creation
- Bruno Robin - régie Son FOH
- Maël Vogel - sound assistant
- Fred Imbert - régie lumiére, lighting creation
- Alice Leclerc - régie lumiére assistant
- Jean-Marc Verdier - his monitors

DVD production

- Jason Wishnow - video editor
- Misha Kachkachishvili (Esplanade Studios) - mixing
- Dave Gardner (Infrasonic Sound) - mastering
- Stéphane Kerrad (KB Studios, Paris) - artwork & design
- Ruben Tomas (FD Studios, Los Angeles) - photography
- Nicole Wittman - makeup

Live for Live

Live album by Ana Popović
- Released: May 15, 2020
- Recorded: 2019
- Genre: Electric blues, funk, soul
- Length: 1:45:47
- Label: ArtisteXclusive records
- Producer: ArtisteXclusive, Ana Popović Music

Ana Popović chronology
Like It on Top (2018)	Live for Live (2020)	Power

== Album track list ==
No.	Title	Writer(s)	Length
1.	"Intro / Ana's Shuffle"	Ana Popović, Tony Coleman	6:02
2.	"Can You Stand the Heat"	A. Popović	3:32
3.	"Object of Obesession"	A. Popović, John Williams	4:02
4.	"Love You Tonight"	A. Popović	5:41
5.	"Train"	A. Popović	5:45
6.	"Long Road Down"	A. Popović	5:11
7.	"New Coat of Paint"	Tom Waits	5:31
8.	"Johnnie Ray"	A. Popović, Kevin Bowe	9:03
9.	"Can't You See What You're Doing to Me"	Roy Turk, Fred E. Ahlert	5:47
10.	"Fencewalk"	Carlos Wilson, Louis Wilson, Ric Wilson, Skip Scarborough	4:54
11.	"If Tomorrow Was Today"	A. Popović	4:19
12.	"Brand New Man"	A. Popović, Kevin Moore	3:33
13.	"Like It on Top"	A. Popović, K. Moore	3:47
14.	"Lasting Kind of Love"	A. Popović, K. Moore	3:52
15.	"Mo' Better Love"	A. Popović, Tommy L. Sims	4:35
16.	"How'd You Learn to Shake It Like That"	James Edward Pryor	6:47
17.	"Show Me How Strong / Going Down / Crosstown Medley"	A. Popović, T, Sims / Don Nix / Jimi Hendrix	13:58
18.	"Tribe"	A. Popović, T. Coleman	9:28

The physical CD release of the album has a shortened track list.

CD track listing
No.	Title	Writer(s)	Length
1.	"Can You Stand the Heat"	A. Popović	3:32
2.	"Object of Obesession"	A. Popović, John Williams	4:02
3.	"Love You Tonight"	A. Popović	5:41
4.	"Train"	A. Popović	5:45
5.	"Long Road Down"	A. Popović	5:11
6.	"New Coat of Paint"	Tom Waits	5:31
7.	"Johnnie Ray"	A. Popović, Kevin Bowe	9:03
8.	"Can't You See What You're Doing to Me"	Roy Turk, Fred E. Ahlert	5:47
9.	"Fencewalk"	Carlos Wilson, Louis Wilson, Ric Wilson, Skip Scarborough	4:54
10.	"If Tomorrow Was Today"	A. Popović	4:19
11.	"Brand New Man"	A. Popović, Kevin Moore	3:33
12.	"Like It on Top"	A. Popović, K. Moore	3:47
13.	"Lasting Kind of Love"	A. Popović, K. Moore	3:52
14.	"Mo' Better Love"	A. Popović, Tommy L. Sims	4:35
15.	"How'd You Learn to Shake It Like That"	James Edward Pryor	7:06
Total length:			1:16:38

== Album personnel ==
Musicians

- Ana Popović – vocals, guitar
- Buthel Burns – bass, backing vocals
- Michele Papadia – keys
- Jerry Kelley – drums, backing vocals
- Claudio Giovagnoli – saxophone
- Davide Ghidoni – trumpet

CD production

- Misha Kachkachishvili (Esplanade Studios) - mixing
- Dave Gardner (Infrasonic Sound) - mastering
- Stéphane Kerrad (KB Studios, Paris) - artwork & design
- Ruben Tomas (FD Studios, Los Angeles) - photography
- Nicole Wittman - makeup
