= Cocaine (song) =

1976 song by J.J. Cale

- German picture sleeve

Single by JJ Cale

from the album Troubadour
- A-side: "Hey Baby"
- Released: 1977
- Genre: Blues rock
- Length: 2:48
- Label: Shelter
- Songwriter: J. J. Cale
- Producer: Audie Ashworth

Audio
- "Cocaine" by J.J. Cale on YouTube

"Cocaine" is a song written and recorded in 1976 by singer-songwriter JJ Cale. The song was popularized by Eric Clapton after his version was released on the 1977 album Slowhand. J. J. Cale's version of "Cocaine" was a number-one hit in New Zealand for a single week and became the seventh-best-selling single of 1977.

Personnel

- JJ Cale – vocals, guitar, bass
- Doug Bartenfeld – guitar
- Reggie Young – guitar solo
- Kenny Buttrey – drums
- Farrell Morris – percussion

== Charts ==
Chart (1977–1979)	Peak position
Australia (Kent Music Report)	45
Austria (Ö3 Austria Top 40)	5
Germany (GfK)	22
New Zealand (Recorded Music NZ)	1
Sweden (Sverigetopplistan)	10
Switzerland (Schweizer Hitparade)	2

== Eric Clapton version ==
"Cocaine"
- Dutch picture sleeve

Single by Eric Clapton

from the album Slowhand
- A-side: "Lay Down Sally"
- Released: 11 November 1977
- Genre: Blues rock
- Length: 3:41
- Label: Polydor
- Songwriter: J. J. Cale
- Producer: Glyn Johns

Eric Clapton singles chronology
"Carnival" (1977)	"Cocaine" (1977)	"Wonderful Tonight" (1978)

Audio
- "Cocaine" by Eric Clapton on YouTube

Live video
- "Cocaine" (2007 live) by Eric Clapton on YouTube
- "Cocaine" (2015 live) by Eric Clapton on YouTube

Glyn Johns produced the Clapton recording, which was released on the 1977 album Slowhand. It was also released as the B-side for "Lay Down Sally".

A live version of "Cocaine" from the album Just One Night charted on the Billboard Hot 100 as the B-side of "Tulsa Time", which was a No. 30 hit in 1980. "Cocaine" was one of several of Cale's songs recorded by Clapton, including "After Midnight" and "Travelin' Light". AllMusic critic Richard Gilliam called it "among [Clapton's] most enduringly popular hits" and noted that "even for an artist like Clapton with a huge body of high-quality work, 'Cocaine' ranks among his best."

Clapton described the song as an anti-drug song intended to warn listeners about cocaine's addictiveness and deadliness. He called the song "quite cleverly anti-cocaine", noting:

It's no good to write a deliberate anti-drug song and hope that it will catch. Because the general thing is that people will be upset by that. It would disturb them to have someone else shoving something down their throat. So the best thing to do is offer something that seems ambiguous—that on study or on reflection actually can be seen to be "anti"—which the song "Cocaine" is actually an anti-cocaine song. If you study it or look at it with a little bit of thought ... from a distance ... or as it goes by ... it just sounds like a song about cocaine. But actually, it is quite cleverly anti-cocaine.

Because of its ambiguous message, Clapton did not perform the song in many of his concerts; over the years, he has added the lyrics 'that dirty cocaine' in live shows to underline the anti-drug message of the song. A live version of the song does appear on Clapton's 1982 hits compilation Time Pieces.

Personnel:

- Eric Clapton – vocals and lead guitar
- George Terry – rhythm guitar
- Dick Sims – hammond organ
- Carl Radle – bass guitar
- Jamie Oldaker – drums

=== Charts ===
Chart (1980)	Peak position
Canada Top Singles (RPM)	3
Netherlands (Dutch Tip 40)	14
US Billboard Hot 100	30

=== Certifications ===
Region	Certification	Certified units/sales
Canada (Music Canada)	Gold	75,000^{^}
Denmark (IFPI Danmark)	Gold	45,000^{‡}
Italy (FIMI)	Gold	25,000^{‡}
Netherlands (NVPI)	Platinum	150,000^{^}
New Zealand (RMNZ)	3× Platinum	90,000^{‡}
United Kingdom (BPI)	Silver	200,000^{‡}
^{^} Shipments figures based on certification alone.^{‡} Sales+streaming figures based on certification alone.

== See also ==
- List of number-one singles in 1977 (New Zealand)
