= Carnival (Eric Clapton song) =

Single by Eric Clapton

from the album No Reason to Cry
- B-side: "Hungry"
- Released: January 1977
- Length: 3:41
- Label: RSO
- Songwriter(s): Eric Clapton
- Producer(s): Rob Fraboni

Eric Clapton singles chronology
"Hello Old Friend" (1976)	"Carnival" (1977)	"Lay Down Sally" (1977)

"Carnival" is a song written and recorded by the British rock musician Eric Clapton for his 1976 studio album No Reason to Cry. It was also released as the second and last single of the studio album in January 1977. Rob Fraboni produced the recording.

== Composition and release ==
The song consists of a verse and identical choruses. It is written in a monotone structure. The song is in the key of A major and features an up-tempo chord progression. Besides being released on the studio album, the title was published under RSO Records as a 7" vinyl gramophone record single. Both the music composing and lyric writing credits belong to Eric Clapton, who published the song and single under Warner/Chappell Music.

== Reception ==
Record World called it "a festive sounding uptempo number that has already built a strong AOR base."

== Chart positions ==
=== Weekly charts ===
Chart (1977)	Peak position
Austria (Ö3 Austria Top 40)	22
Netherlands (Dutch Tip 40)	20
