= Blue Room (Ana & Milton Popović album) =

Studio album by Ana & Milton Popović
- Released: May 15, 2015
- Recorded: November 9–17, 2014 and January 2–7, 2015
- Genre: Blues, soul
- Length: 41:55
- Label: ArtisteXclusive records
- Producer: Jim Gaines

Ana & Milton Popović chronology
Can You Stand the Heat (2013)	Blue Room (2015)	Trilogy (2016)

Blue Room is Ana Popović's studio album that she made with her father, released on May 15, 2015, on ArtisteXclusive records. The album was recorded by Ana and Milton for Ana and her children as a tribute to her father, dedicated to all the fathers that support their musician and guitar playing children. Ana had played the album songs for years with Milton. Although Milton was never a professional musician, he loved the music and played as a hobby. Ana had been trying for years to get Milton into the studio, but he held back for 10 years. Ana finally convinced him to record something, and when she got him there, it was like he had always been doing studio work. The title, The Blue Room came from the name given to a room in her family's 11th floor apartment in Belgrade where Milton and his friends played and discussed blues and rock albums and a young Ana eventually picked up a guitar and joined in.

== Track list ==
No.	Title	Writer(s)	Length
1.	"Catfish Blues"	Robert Petway	2:19
2.	"I'm Losing You"	John Lennon	4:37
3.	"Evening Shadows"	Van Morrison, Acker Bilk	4:06
4.	"Grant Spivey"	Victoria Spivey	3:00
5.	"Somebody"	John Brannen, Jack Tempchin	4:23
6.	"Did Somebody Make a Fool Out of You"	Tony Joe White	4:36
7.	"We Used to Know"	Ian Anderson	3:33
8.	"Rainy Night in Georgia"	T.J. White	4:44
9.	"Red River Blues"	Brownie McGhee, Sonny Terry	3:21
10.	"Baby What's Wrong"	Jimmy Reed	3:32
11.	"Tupelo"	John Lee Hooker	3:44

== Personnel ==
Musicians

- Ana Popović – vocals, electric guitar, acoustic guitar, rhythm guitar, slide guitar
- Milutin Popović – vocals, electric guitar, acoustic guitar, rhythm guitar
- Rick Steff – keys (tracks 3, 4, 7, 8 & 9)
- Harold Smith – rhythm guitar (tracks 8 & 9)
- Steve Potts – drums (tracks 1 & 11)
- Dave Smith – bass
- Donald Hayes – strings (track 8)
- Deborah Winey & Susan Marshall – backing vocals (tracks 2 & 5)

Production

- Jim Gaines - production, mixing, recording, engineering
- Brad Blackwood - mastering
- Recorded on November 9–17, 2014 and January 2–3, 2015 in Stantonville, TN, and on January 4–7, 2015 at Archer Music and Arts Studio, Memphis, TN
