= List of number-one singles in 1977 (New Zealand) =

This is a list of number-one hit singles in 1977 in New Zealand, starting with the first chart dated 28 January 1977.

== Chart ==
Key
‡ – Single of New Zealand origin

Week	Artist	Title
7 January 1977	Summer break - no chart	Summer break - no chart
14 January 1977	Summer break - no chart	Summer break - no chart
21 January 1977	Summer break - no chart	Summer break - no chart
28 January 1977	Summer break - no chart	Summer break - no chart
6 February 1977	Summer break - no chart	Summer break - no chart
13 February 1977	Leo Sayer	"You Make Me Feel Like Dancing"
20 February 1977	Leo Sayer	"You Make Me Feel Like Dancing"
27 February 1977	Engelbert Humperdinck	"After the Lovin'"
6 March 1977	J.J. Cale	"Cocaine"
13 March 1977	Engelbert Humperdinck	"After the Lovin'"
20 March 1977	David Soul	"Don't Give Up on Us"
27 March 1977	David Soul	"Don't Give Up on Us"
3 April 1977	David Soul	"Don't Give Up on Us"
10 April 1977	David Soul	"Don't Give Up on Us"
17 April 1977	Easter holiday - no chart	Easter holiday - no chart
24 April 1977	Tom Jones	"Say You'll Stay Until Tomorrow"
1 May 1977	David Soul	"Don't Give Up on Us"
8 May 1977	Julie Covington	"Don't Cry For Me Argentina"
15 May 1977	Julie Covington	"Don't Cry For Me Argentina"
22 May 1977	Julie Covington	"Don't Cry For Me Argentina"
29 May 1977	Julie Covington	"Don't Cry For Me Argentina"
5 June 1977	Mark Williams	"It Doesn't Matter Anymore"^{‡}
12 June 1977	Mark Williams	"It Doesn't Matter Anymore"^{‡}
19 June 1977	Mark Williams	"It Doesn't Matter Anymore"^{‡}
26 June 1977	Mark Williams	"It Doesn't Matter Anymore"^{‡}
3 July 1977	Pussycat	"My Broken Souvenirs"
10 July 1977	Pussycat	"My Broken Souvenirs"
17 July 1977	Pussycat	"My Broken Souvenirs"
24 July 1977	Pussycat	"My Broken Souvenirs"
31 July 1977	Pussycat	"My Broken Souvenirs"
7 August 1977	Heatwave	"Boogie Nights"
14 August 1977	Heatwave	"Boogie Nights"
21 August 1977	Heatwave	"Boogie Nights"
28 August 1977	Heatwave	"Boogie Nights"
4 September 1977	Heatwave	"Boogie Nights"
11 September 1977	Heatwave	"Boogie Nights"
18 September 1977	Heatwave	"Boogie Nights"
25 September 1977	Electric Light Orchestra	"Telephone Line"
2 October 1977	Electric Light Orchestra	"Telephone Line"
9 October 1977	Electric Light Orchestra	"Telephone Line"
16 October 1977	Electric Light Orchestra	"Telephone Line"
23 October 1977	Electric Light Orchestra	"Telephone Line"
30 October 1977	Paul Nicholas	"Heaven on the 7th Floor"
6 November 1977	Electric Light Orchestra	"Telephone Line"
13 November 1977	The Floaters	"Float On"
20 November 1977	The Floaters	"Float On"
27 November 1977	The Floaters	"Float On"
4 December 1977	The Floaters	"Float On"
11 December 1977	The Floaters	"Float On"
18 December 1977	The Floaters	"Float On"
25 December 1977	Summer break - no chart	Summer break - no chart

== Notes ==
- Number of number-one singles: 12
- Longest run at number-one: "Boogie Nights" by Heatwave

== See also ==
- 1977 in music
- RIANZ
