= Loud Guitars, Big Suspicions =

Studio album by Shannon Curfman
- Released: September 28, 1999
- Length: 43:49
- Label: Arista

Shannon Curfman chronology
Loud Guitars, Big Suspicions (1999)	Take It Like a Man (2006)

Professional ratings
Review scores
Source	Rating
AllMusic	3/5 stars

Loud Guitars, Big Suspicions is the debut album by American blues rock artist Shannon Curfman, released in 1999 through Arista Records when she was 14 years old.

== Track listing ==
1. "Few and Far Between" (Kevin Bowe, Shannon Curfman) – 3:54
2. "No Riders" (Bowe, Curfman) – 3:29
3. "True Friends" (Bruce McCabe) – 3:29
4. "If You Change Your Mind" (Bowe, Curfman, David Grissom) – 4:25
5. "Love Me Like That" (Bowe, Curfman, Jonny Lang) – 3:22
6. "Playing with Fire" (Curfman, Gordon Kennedy, Wayne Kirkpatrick, Tommy Sims) – 4:56
7. "I Don't Make Promises (I Can't Break)" (Bowe, Kostas) – 3:48
8. "Hard to Make a Stand" (Bill Bottrell, Scott Bryan, Sheryl Crow, Todd Wolfe) – 4:01
9. "The Weight" (Robbie Robertson) – 5:26
10. "Never Enough" (Bowe, Curfman) – 3:47
11. "I'm Coming Home" (Bowe, Curfman, McCabe) – 3:12
