= Communist Daughter =

American indie rock band

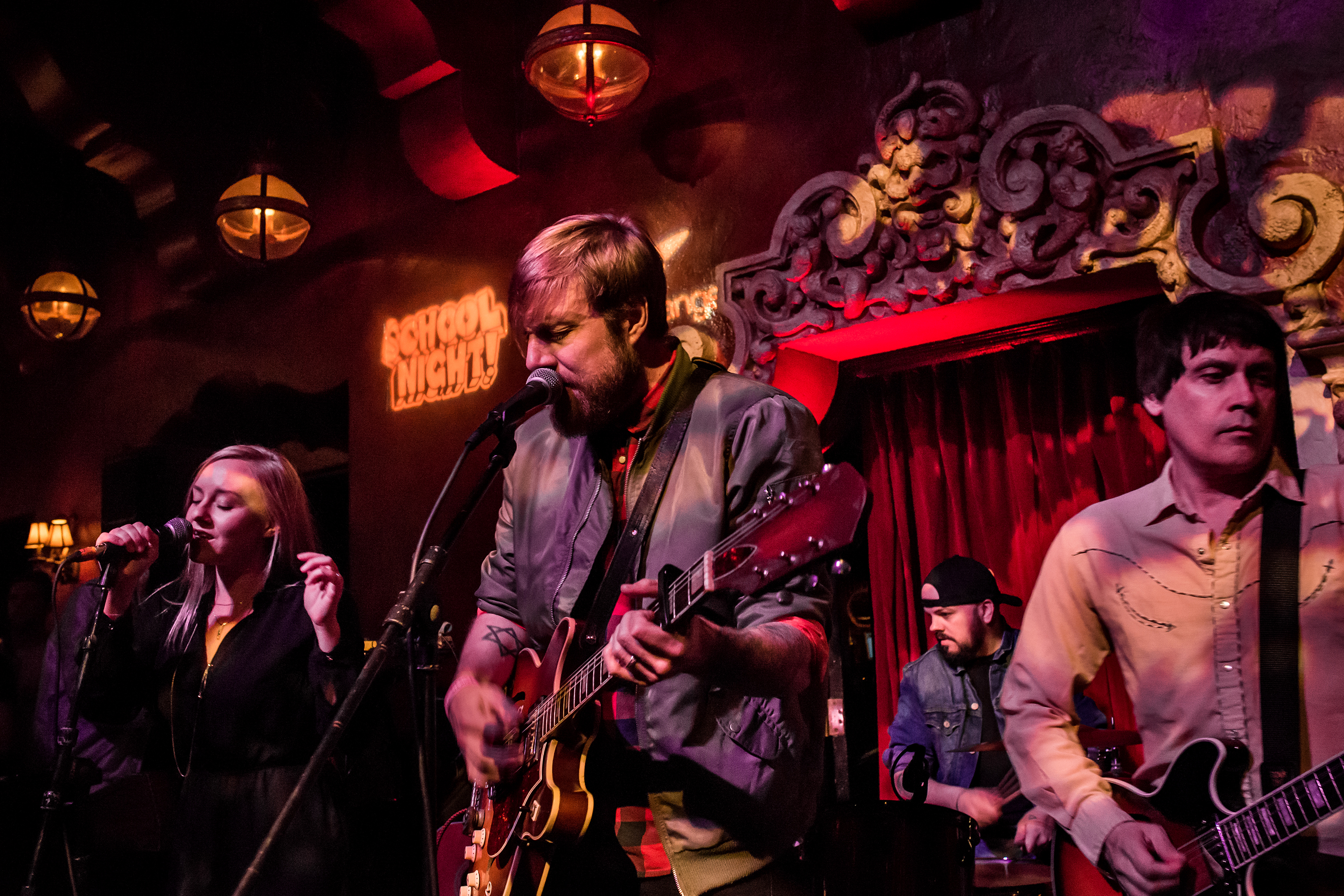
- The band performing live in January 2017

Background information
- Origin: Saint Paul, Minnesota, United States
- Genres: Indie rock, indie folk
- Years active: 2009–present
- Label: Grain Belt
- Members: Johnny Solomon; Adam Switlick; Molly Moore; Al Weiers; Dillon Marchus; Steven Yasgar
- Past members: Jonathan Blaseg; Christopher McGuire; Lee VanLith; Ian Prince; Dan DeMuth
- Website: www.communistdaughter.com

Communist Daughter is an indie rock band from Saint Paul, Minnesota, founded by Johnny Solomon in 2009. They have released three albums and three EPs.

== History ==
=== 2009-2010: Soundtrack to the End ===
Communist Daughter was founded in 2009 by singer and songwriter Johnny Solomon in Prescott, Wisconsin. Solomon moved from Saint Paul to Prescott in 2007 after addiction, mental health issues, and a spell in jail caused the breakup of his marriage and of his band, Friends Like These. There he took over the Boxcar restaurant and began writing and recording as Communist Daughter, taking the name from a Neutral Milk Hotel song. He assembled a band of Twin Cities musicians–bassist–Adam Switlick (formerly the guitarist with Friends Like These), keyboardist Jonathan Blaseg, and drummer Steve Yasgar (formerly of A Whisper in the Noise and Swiss Army)–recording a four-song demo that included the track "Not The Kid." Communist Daughter signed to Grain Belt Records and began recording their debut album Soundtrack to the End. They added singer Molly Moore, whom Solomon met when she visited his restaurant, and guitarist Al Weiers (formerly of Faux Jean and the Odd). Steve Yasgar took a break from the band during the recording, and they finished the album with drummer Christopher McGuire (12 Rods, Kid Dakota).

In March, 2010, the single "Not The Kid" reached No. 1 on KCMP 89.3 The Current's charts. Steve Yasgar returned to the band, bringing along keyboardist Lee VanLith, who played with Yasgar in A Whisper in the Noise. Soundtrack to the End was released in April 2010 on Grain Belt Records. The critic for the Star Tribune placed it as third on his top ten list for the year. Five years later that same critic rated the album as the second best to have come from Minnesota in the first half of the 2010s. Two songs from Soundtrack To The End ("Speed of Sound" and "Soundtrack to the End") were featured in Season 7 Episode 14 (P.Y.T.) of the ABC show Grey's Anatomy.

The year ended with Solomon confronting renewed mental health and addiction problems, just as the band was poised for success. They participated in two end-of-the year tribute shows at First Avenue, beginning with a late November tribute to The Replacements. The band ended the year with a shambolic Golden Slumbers cover at First Avenue's annual John Lennon tribute, after which Solomon checked himself into the Hazelden treatment center.

=== 2011-2015: touring, EPs, and vinyl remix ===
Solomon moved back to Saint Paul in 2011, following his release from Hazelden. Steve Yasgar and Lee VanLith left the band in April, 2011 and Ian Prince joined on drums. They remixed Soundtrack to the End for vinyl, rerecording some of the drum tracks with Prince because the original tapes had been lost. They then recorded the EP Something Wicked This Way Comes with a limited release in September 2011. In 2012, Dan DeMuth replaced Ian Prince on drums, and multi-instrumentalist Dillon Marchus replaced keyboardist Jonathan Blaseg. In July they released Lions & Lambs and toured nationally, including the CMJ Music Festival and several dates with Jason Isbell & the 400 Unit.

The band toured throughout 2013, 2014, and 2015, as they worked on their second album with Kevin Bowe. The band was featured in Paste Magazine's Best of What's Next 20 issue (#105) in August 2013. In September, 2013, singers Molly Moore and Johnny Solomon married. In March, 2014, the band played the South by Southwest festival in Austin, Texas. In July 2014, Dan DeMuth left the band, and Yasgar rejoined as Communist Daughter toured extensively, including more dates with Isbell. The Solomons also began playing acoustic duo shows, reaching out to fans on Twitter. In 2015 they toured as both a full band and as an acoustic duo, and they finished the year with an EP of sad Christmas tunes, Sing Sad Christmas, featuring covers of various depressing holiday tunes, including the Pogues' "Fairytale of New York" and The Boy Least Likely To's "Blue Spruce Needles".

=== 2016-2017: The Cracks That Built the Wall ===
2016 saw the release of the band's second full-length album, The Cracks That Built the Wall. The first single, “Roll a Stone,” was featured in USA Today’s “10 best songs of the week” and on NPR Music’s "10 Songs Public Radio Can’t Stop Playing.” The album finished the year as number three on the Star Tribune's Minnesota top ten. The song "Keep Moving" was used on an episode of the Showtime series Shameless and on an episode of The Blacklist.

Solomon also became active in speaking out about his mental illness and addiction, and about artists' need to care for themselves. In August he joined the board of Dissonance, a nonprofit organization that works on these issues. In September he wrote an article for Talkhouse that frankly detailed his struggles with undiagnosed bipolar disorder and addiction during the band's first years.

The band toured again in 2017, playing dates with The Dig, Jason Isbell, Balto, and Seratones, and returning to SXSW. Cuepoint named their SXSW performance the 11th freshest that they saw. During SXSW the band played a live session for Paste Magazine. In May, Twin Cities PBS broadcast a short documentary about the band, including footage from a show that had been taped live in their studio.

=== 2020: Unknown Caller and Alaska ===
On March 12, 2020 the band announced a Indiegogo project to raise funds to release its third album, Unknown Caller. The Indiegogo project states that Moore and Solomon gave up a relentless touring schedule and moved first to San Diego to care for aging family, and then to their new home in a remote village in the Alaskan tundra.

The album was released directly to project funders on May 9, 2020.

== Musical style ==
The band's music has been described as folk rock, folk pop, and indie pop. Solomon's vocals have been compared with Andrew Bird. Songs on the second album have drawn comparisons to Yo La Tengo and Bruce Springsteen.

== Band members ==
=== Current ===
- Johnny Solomon – guitar, lead vocals
- Molly Moore Solomon – lead vocals
- Steven Yasgar – drums
- Adam Switlick – bass guitar, vocals
- Dillon Marchus – keyboards, guitar
- Al Weiers - guitar

=== Former ===
- Christopher McGuire (2009) – drums
- Jonathan Blaseg (2009–2012) – keyboards
- Lee VanLith (2010–2011) – keyboards
- Ian Prince (2011) – drums
- Dan DeMuth (2012-2014) – drums

== Discography ==
=== Albums ===
- Soundtrack to the End (2010)
- The Cracks That Built the Wall (2016)
- Unknown Caller (2020)

=== EPs ===
- Something Wicked This Way Comes (2011)
- Lions & Lambs (2012)
- Sing Sad Christmas (2015)
