= Ana! Live in Amsterdam =

Live album by Ana Popović

Video by Ana Popović
- Released: May 31, 2005
- Recorded: January 30, 2005
- Genre: Electric blues, blues rock, jazz, soul
- Length: 1:40:00
- Label: Ruf
- Producer: Thomas Ruf (executive producer)

Ana Popović chronology
Ana! Live in Amsterdam (2005)	An evening at Trasimeno Lake (2009)

Ana! Live in Amsterdam is Ana Popović's first concert video and live album, with the video released on May 31, 2005, and the album released on July 26, 2005. The album is not pure blues but showcases modern and cross-border blues with rock, soul, and jazz elements. "Sittin' on Top of the World" is a classic Chicago blues track, "Bigtown Playboy" showcases her slide guitar skills, "Won't Let You Down" gives off the funk and soul of Sade, and "Navojo Moon" is dedicated to the guitarists who influenced her style, such as Stevie Ray Vaughan and Ronnie Earl. Although Popović was born in Belgrade, Serbia, she had moved to Europe and had adopted Amsterdam as her new home, so this concert was presented in her new hometown.

== Video track list ==
No.	Title	Writer(s)	Length
1.	"Opening + Don't Bear Down on Me"	Ana Popović, Todd Sharpville
2.	"Sittin' on Top of the World"	Chester "Howlin' Wolf" Burnett	4:33
3.	"Love Me Again"	Susan Marshall, Mike Carroll	5:10
4.	"Comfort to the Soul"	A. Popović	6:03
5.	"Hometown"	A. Popović, Rade Popović
6.	"Navajo Moon"	A. Popović	8:56
7.	"Night by Night"	Walter Becker, Donald Fagen	4:11
8.	"Bigtown Playboy" (featuring Angela Strehli)	Little Johnny Jones	6:00
9.	"Won't Let You Down"	A. Popović, Rob Geboers, Ronald Oor	4:53
10.	"Jaco"	A. Popović	6:37
11.	"Long Way Home"	John Amor, Hugh Coltman, Jess Davey, Robin L. Davey	5:07
12.	"My Man"	A. Popović, Mark van Meurs	5:43
13.	"Long Lost Love" (Bonus: Acoustic Session)	A. Popović, M. van Meurs
14.	"Damn Your Eyes" (Bonus: Acoustic Session)	Barbara Wyrick, Steve Bogard
15.	"Done Somebody Wrong" (Bonus: E.J. in Amsterdam)	Elmore James
16.	"Bonus Material" (Interview, Photo Gallery)

== Video personnel ==
Musicians

- Ana Popović – vocals, guitar, slide guitar
- Fabrice Ach – bass
- Denis Palatin – drums
- Dominique Vantomme – piano
- Angela Strehli – vocals (track 8)

Production

- Thomas Ruf - Executive producer
- Ronald Trijber - mixing and mastering
- Recorded live on January 30, 2005 in Amsterdam, NL at Melkweg

Ana! Live in Amsterdam

Live album by Ana Popović
- Released: July 26, 2005
- Recorded: January 30, 2005
- Genre: Electric blues, blues rock
- Length: 1:07:04
- Label: Ruf Records
- Producer: Thomas Ruf (executive producer)

Ana Popović chronology
Comfort to the Soul (2003)	Ana! Live in Amsterdam (2005)	Still Making History (2007)

== Album track list ==
No.	Title	Writer(s)	Length
1.	"Intro"		3:01
2.	"Don't Bear Down on Me"	Ana Popović, Todd Sharpville	3:37
3.	"Sittin' on Top of the World"	Chester "Howlin' Wolf" Burnett	4:33
4.	"Love Me Again"	Susan Marshall, Mike Carroll	5:10
5.	"Comfort to the Soul"	A. Popović	6:03
6.	"Navajo Moon"	A. Popović	8:56
7.	"Night by Night"	Walter Becker, Donald Fagen	4:11
8.	"Bigtown Playboy" (featuring Angela Strehli)	Little Johnny Jones	6:00
9.	"Won't Let You Down"	A. Popović, Rob Geboers, Ronald Oor	4:53
10.	"Jaco"	A. Popović	6:37
11.	"Long Way Home"	John Amor, Hugh Coltman, Jess Davey, Robin L. Davey	5:07
12.	"My Man"	A. Popović, Mark van Meurs	5:43
13.	"Long Lost Love"	A. Popović, M. van Meurs	3:23

== Album personnel ==
Musicians

- Ana Popović – vocals, guitar, slide guitar
- Fabrice Ach – bass
- Denis Palatin – drums
- Dominique Vantomme – piano
- Angela Strehli – vocals (track 8)

Production

- Thomas Ruf - Executive producer
- Ronald Trijber - mixing and mastering
- Recorded live on January 30, 2005 in Amsterdam, NL at Melkweg
