= Unconditional (Ana Popović album) =

Studio album by Ana Popović
- Released: August 16, 2011
- Recorded: February 17–27
- Genre: Blues, blues rock, soul blues
- Length: 50:53
- Label: Eclecto Groove Records
- Producer: Randy Chortkoff (executive producer), Ana Popović, John Porter

Ana Popović chronology
An evening at Trasimeno Lake (2010)	Unconditional (2011)	Can You Stand the Heat (2013)

Unconditional is Ana Popović's fifth studio album, released on August 16, 2011 on Eclecto Groove Records, her last on that label. The album features some guest slide guitar work with Sonny Landreth. Popović states in her liner notes that the title Unconditional is her mission statement and her state of being.

== Track list ==
No.	Title	Writer(s)	Length
1.	"Fearless"	Ana Popović	3:16
2.	"Count Me In"	Ana Popović	4:54
3.	"Unconditional"	A. Popović	3:52
4.	"Reset Rewind"	A. Popović	3:38
5.	"Slideshow" (featuring Sonny Landreth on 2nd slide guitar)	A. Popović, Sonny Landreth	5:22
6.	"Business as Usual"	A. Popović, Mark van Meurs	3:22
7.	"Your Love Ain't Real"	A. Popović	4:15
8.	"Work Song"	Nat Adderley, Oscar Brown, Jr.	4:01
9.	"Summer Rain"	A. Popović, M. van Meurs	4:36
10.	"Voodoo Woman"	Koko Taylor	4:11
11.	"One Room Country Shack"	Mercy Walton	6:33
12.	"Soulful Dress"	Maurice McAlister, Terry Vail	2:53

== Personnel ==
Musicians

- Ana Popović – vocals, electric guitar, acoustic guitar, slide guitar
- Sonny Landreth – slide guitar (track 5)
- Calvin Turner – bass
- Doug Belote – drums
- Leon "Kid Chocolate" Brown – trumpet
- Tom Fitzpatrick – saxophone
- Jon Cleary – keys (all tracks except 8 & 10)
- David Torkanowski – keys (tracks 8 & 10)
- Jason Ricci – harmonica (track 2)
- Avist Martin Mycartery "Scooter" Groce, Jerome Alexander – background vocals

Production

- Randy Chortkoff - executive producer
- Ana Popović - production
- John Porter - production, recording, engineering, mixing and mastering (Recorded February 17–23 in the Piety Studios, New Orleans, LA, and February 23–27 in the Jon Cleary Studio, New Orleans)
- Wesley Fontenot - recording and engineering
- Mike Dorsey – additional engineering
