= Trilogy (Ana Popović album) =

Studio album by Ana Popović
- Released: May 20, 2016
- Genre: Disc 1 - Funk, soul, R&B; Disc 2 - Blues rock Disc 3 - Jazz
- Length: 1:33:55
- Label: ArtisteXclusive records
- Producer: Warren Riker, Ana Popović, Tom Hambridge, Cody Dickinson, Delfeayo Marsalis

Ana Popović chronology
| Blue Room (2015) | Trilogy (2016) | Like It on Top (2018) |

Trilogy is the seventh solo studio album by the United States-based blues guitarist and singer from Serbia, Ana Popović. It was released on May 20, 2016.

== Development ==
Popović wrote or co-wrote the majority of the songs on the triple album, fifteen of the twenty-three songs. She enlisted the help of many top industry guest artists, such as guitarist Joe Bonamassa, lap steel guitarist Robert Randolph, rapper Al Kapone, and drummers Bernard Purdie and North Mississippi Allstars's Cody Dickinson. She also got some impressive support behind the scenes, with Tom Hambridge and Delfeayo Marsalis among others producing songs for the album. When interviewed by Guitar World, Popović explained that she has always had a mix of styles on her albums, blues, jazz and funk. Some fans told her how they separated out the styles, making compositions of one style or the other, which intrigued Popović. Then in 2015 she had an incident on tour where the band's touring van was stolen with all the gear in it, and it was only with the support of her fans that they continued the tour. Popović was grateful, and wanted to give something back, so she conceived of the idea of doing a triple album divided into her various styles, so some could buy just the style they liked. She envisioned the project with different producers, different bands, and different recording studios.

The album is divided into three discs, with three different styles. Disc One – Morning is her soul, funk and R&B album, produced by Grammy-winning Warren Riker and Popović, and recorded at Esplanade Studios, New Orleans in Louisiana, Royal Studios and Music+Arts Studio, Memphis and The Switchyard, Nashville in Tennessee, and Full Sail Studio, Orlandoin Florida. Besides Popović's strong guitar work, Morning uses plenty of horns and piano, and features Joe Bonamassa as a guest guitarist on "Train", ending the song with a smoking outro.

Disc Two – Mid-Day contains the blues rock that is more typical of Popović. The songs were recorded and produced by several people at different locations. It was recorded by Warren Riker at Esplanade Studios, New Orleans in Louisiana, by Tom Hambridge at The Switchyard, Nashville in Tennessee, and by Cody Dickinson at the Zebra Ranch near Memphis in Mississippi. Popović includes a dueling guitar song "Woman to Love", where she dueled with herself via the magic of double-tracking. The disc contains a soulful duet with Alphonzo Bailey, better known as rapper Al Kapone.

Finally Disc Three – Midnight explores Popović jazz tendencies. This disc has more cover songs than any of the others, as she covers a Tom Waits song, a Duke Ellington number, and also a Billie Holiday tune. The jazz disc was recorded at Esplanade Studios, New Orleans in Louisiana by Delfeayo Marsalis, and uses a variety of saxophones, acoustic bass, and drums, with Kyle Roussell on piano. Popović tried out a new guitar for Midnight, using a Gibson ES-175 for the jazz numbers instead of her usual Strat which she uses for rock and blues. She also adapted her voice to jazz, leaving the growling and shouting for the first two discs and shifting to crooning, giving off a smokey late night vibe.

== Track listing ==
- Total length: 1:33:55

=== Disc One – Morning ===
| No. | Title | Writer(s) | Length |
|---|---|---|---|
| 1. | "Love You Tonight" | Ana Popović | 4:04 |
| 2. | "She Was a Doorman" | A. Popović, Shannon Sanders | 4:03 |
| 3. | "Show You How Strong You Are" | A. Popović, Tommy L. Sims | 3:23 |
| 4. | "Fencewalk" | Carlos Wilson, Louis Wilson, Ric Wilson, Skip Scarborough | 4:21 |
| 5. | "Train" (featuring Joe Bonamassa) | A. Popović | 4:57 |
| 6. | "If Tomorrow Was Today" | A. Popović | 5:15 |
| 7. | "Long Road Down" | A. Popović | 4:32 |
| 8. | "Hook Me Up" (featuring Robert Randolph) | Johnny "Guitar" Watson | 4:37 |
| 9. | "Too Late" | A. Popović | 5:26 |
| Total length: | | | 40:38 |

=== Disc Two – Mid-Day ===
| No. | Title | Writer(s) | Length |
|---|---|---|---|
| 1. | "You Got the Love" | Chaka Khan, Ray Parker Jr. | 5:28 |
| 2. | "Johnnie Ray" | A. Popović, Kevin Bowe | 3:46 |
| 3. | "Woman to Love" | A. Popović | 3:19 |
| 4. | "Let's Do It Again" (featuring Al Kapone & Cody Dickinson) | Curtis Mayfield | 3:51 |
| 5. | "Who's Yo' Mama?" | A. Popović | 3:18 |
| 6. | "Wasted" | A. Popović, M. van Meurs | 2:18 |
| 7. | "Crying for Me" | A. Popović | 3:09 |
| Total length: | | | 25:09 |

=== Disc Three – Midnight ===
| No. | Title | Writer(s) | Length |
|---|---|---|---|
| 1. | "New Coat of Paint" | Tom Waits | 3:27 |
| 2. | "Waiting on You" | A. Popović | 4:32 |
| 3. | "In a Sentimental Mood" | Duke Ellington, Manny Kurtz | 3:39 |
| 4. | "Old Country" | Curtis Reginald Lewis, Nat Adderley | 3:46 |
| 5. | "Waiting on You (Double-Time Swing)" | A. Popović | 3:59 |
| 6. | "Heaven's Crying aka Song for the Next Generation" | A. Popović, M. van Meurs, K. Bowe, Cindy Scott | 4:00 |
| 7. | "You Don't Know What Love Is" | Don Raye, Gene de Paul | 4:45 |
| Total length: | | | 28:08 |

== Personnel ==
Disc One – Morning

Musicians

- Ana Popović - vocals, guitar, slide guitar
- Ivan Neville - keys, backing vocals
- Derwin Perkins - rhythm guitar
- George Porter Jr. - bass, backing vocals
- Raymond Weber - drums, backing vocals
- Harold Smith - rhythm guitar (tracks 2, 7 & 8)
- Jackie Clark - bass (track 2, 7 & 8)
- Jason Clark - keys (track 8)
- Peewee Jackson - drums (track 8)
- Mark Mullins - trumpet (tracks 1 & 2)
- Bobby Campo - trombone (tracks 1 & 2)
- Jason Mingledorff - saxophone
- Joe Bonamassa - guitar (track 5)
- Robert Randolph - lap steel guitar (track 8)
- Angela Primm - backing vocals (track 6)
- Anjelika "Jelly" Joseph and Erica Falls - backing vocals (tracks 5 & 7)

Production

- Produced by Warren Riker and Ana Popović
- Mixed by Warren Riker
- Mastered by Dave Gardner

Disc Two – Mid-Day

Musicians

- Ana Popović - vocals, guitar, slide guitar
- Al Kapone - vocals (track 4)
- Tommy Sims - rhythm guitar (tracks 1 & 2)
- Cody Dickinson - keys, drums (tracks 4 & 6)
- Ivan Neville - keys (track 7)
- Derwin Perkins - rhythm guitar (track 7)
- George Porter Jr. - bass (track 7)
- Raymond Weber - drums (track 7)
- Jackie Clark - bass (track 3)
- Jason Clark - keys (track 3)
- Peewee Jackson - drums (track 3)
- Michele Papadia - keys (track 2)
- Mark van Meurs - bass (track 6)
- Stéphane Avellaneda - drums (track 2)
- Edward Cleveland - drums (track 1)
- Angela Primm - backing vocals (track 3)

Production

- Produced by Tom Hambridge (tracks 1, 2, 3 & 5)
- Produced by Ana Popović and Cody Dickinson (tracks 4 & 6)
- Produced by Warren Riker (track 7)
- Mixed and Mastered by Tom Hambridge and Michael Saint-Leon (except track 7)
- Mixed and Mastered by Warren Riker (track 7)

Disc Three – Midnight

Musicians

- Ana Popović - vocals, guitar
- Delfeayo Marsalis - trombone & horn arrangement
- Khari Allen Lee - alto saxophone (tracks 1, 3 & 5)
- Roderick "Rev" Paulin - tenor saxophone (tracks 1 & 3)
- Scott Johnson - baritone saxophone (tracks 1 & 3)
- Kyle Roussell - piano
- David Pulphus - acoustic bass
- Barry Stephenson - acoustic bass (tracks 6 & 7)
- Herlin Riley - drums
- Bernard Purdie - drums (track 6 & 7)

Production

- Produced by Delfeayo Marsalis
- Mixed and Mastered by Mischa Kachkachishvili
