= Still Making History =

Third studio album by Ana Popović

Studio album by Ana Popović
- Released: June 19, 2007
- Genre: Blues, blues rock, soul blues
- Length: 1:03:37
- Label: Eclecto Groove Records
- Producer: Randy Chortkoff (executive producer), David Z, John Porter

Ana Popović chronology
Ana! Live in Amsterdam (2005)	Still Making History (2007)	Blind for Love (2009)

Still Making History is Ana Popović's third studio album, released on June 19, 2007, on Eclecto Groove Records, her debut album in the US and on her new label, produced by Grammy winning producer John Porter. The album explores the different ways we connect over the centuries. The album also looks at the various forms of love in its many forms, such as true love, new-found love, forbidden love. Global, cultural and personal history are all touched on. Still Making History made it onto Billboard's Blues Album charts on October 20, 2009, spent 13 weeks in the top 15, and peaked at number 4 on December 8 and 15.

== Track list ==
No.	Title	Writer(s)	Length
1.	"U Complete Me"	Ana Popović, Mark van Meurs	3:48
2.	"Hold On"	A. Popović, M. van Meurs, Rudie van Meurs	4:11
3.	"Between Our Worlds"	A. Popović	5:08
4.	"Is This Everything There Is?"	A. Popović, M. van Meurs	3:59
5.	"Hungry"	Marcella Levy, Dick Sims	4:08
6.	"Doubt Everyone But Me"	A. Popović	4:22
7.	"You Don't Move Me"	Big Mama Thornton	4:43
8.	"Still Making History"	A. Popović	6:07
9.	"My Favorite Night"	A. Popović	4:56
10.	"How'd You Learn to Shake It Like That"	James Edward Pryor	3:57
11.	"Shadow After Dark"	A. Popović	4:17
12.	"Calendars"	A. Popović	4:24
13.	"Sexiest Man Alive"	A. Popović, Terry Man	4:14
14.	"U Complete Me (Blues Version)" (Bonus Track)	A. Popović, M. van Meurs	5:24

== Personnel ==
Musicians

- Ana Popović – vocals, guitar, slide guitar
- Jack Holder – rhythm guitar
- Dave Smith – bass
- Steve Potts – drums
- Al Gamble – Hammond B3
- Tony Braunagel – drums, vocal
- Lenny Castro – congas, percussion, tambourine
- Jon Cleary – clavinet, piano, Wurlitzer, vocals
- Portia Griffin, Jessica Williams, Cynthia Manley and Jacqueline Johnson – background vocals
- Scott Thompson – trumpet
- Mike Finnigan – Hammond B3, vocals
- Sam Shoup – bass
- Jim Spake – saxophone
- Terry Wilson – bass, vocals
- Texacali Horns – brass (Joe Sublet – tenor saxophone; Darrell Leonard – trumpet, trombone)

Production

- Randy Chortkoff - executive producer
- David Z – production and engineering (tracks 2, 4, 9, 11, 12 & 14)
- John Porter – production and mixing (tracks 1, 3, 5, 6, 7, 8, 10 & 13)
- Doug Sax – mastering at The Mastering Lab, Ojai, CA
- Sangwook "Sunny" Nam – mastering at The Mastering Lab, Ojai, CA
- Robert Stolpe - photography
- Joshua Temkin – artwork
