= Can You Stand the Heat =

Studio album by Ana Popović
- Released: March 27, 2013
- Recorded: April and October 2012, January 2013
- Genre: Blues, jazz, funk, soul
- Length: 58:36
- Label: ArtisteXclusive records
- Producer: Ana Popović, Tony Coleman, Tommy Sims

Ana Popović chronology
Unconditional (2011)	Can You Stand the Heat (2013)	Blue Room (2015)

Singles from Can You Stand the Heat
- 1. "Can You Stand the Heat" Released: December 20, 2012

Professional ratings
Review scores
Source	Rating
Blues Rock Review	8/10 stars

Can You Stand the Heat is Ana Popović's sixth studio album, released on March 27, 2013, on ArtisteXclusive records. The album has eleven original songs and three cover songs, and features guest appearances with Grammy Award winner Tommy Sims and Grammy nominee Lucky Peterson, and was produced by B.B. King's drummer of twenty-five years, Tony Coleman. She met Coleman when she was opening for B.B. King, and they wondered if groovy blues was fading from the scene, so they came up with the idea of making a blues album in the style of Albert Collins and Albert King, using funk and "old-school" soul. Popović relocated her family from Amsterdam to Memphis so that she could record at Ardent Studios and to embrace the music aura that circulates in the city's perennial juke joints. The title track, "Can You Stand the Heat", was released as single before the album was released, and a video was shot for the song, directed Jonathan Pekar.

== Track list ==
No.	Title	Writer(s)	Length
1.	"Can You Stand the Heat"	Ana Popović	5:00
2.	"Can't You See What You're Doing to Me"	Roy Turk, Fred E. Ahlert	3:52
3.	"Mo' Better Love"	A. Popović, Tommy L. Sims	3:27
4.	"Object of Obsession"	A. Popović, John Williams	4:14
5.	"Boys' Night Out"	A. Popović, Mark van Meurs, Tony Coleman	2:27
6.	"Hot Southern Night" (with Lucky Peterson)	A. Popović, M. van Meurs	3:39
7.	"Every Kind of People"	Andy Fraser	4:10
8.	"Ana's Shuffle"	A. Popović, Tony Coleman	4:07
9.	"Blues for Mrs. Pauline / Leave My Boy Alone"	A. Popović, T. Coleman, Buddy Guy	7:11
10.	"Leave Well Enough Alone (aka High Maintenance You)"	A. Popović, M. van Meurs, T. Coleman	4:11
11.	"Tribe"	A. Popović, Tony Coleman	5:47
12.	"Rain Fall Down"	Mick Jagger, Keith Richards	4:07
13.	"Growing Up Too Soon" (Bonus track)	A. Popović	2:58
14.	"Mo' Better Love" (with Tommy Sims – Bonus track)	A. Popović, T. Sims	3:26

== Personnel ==
Musicians

- Ana Popović – vocals, lead guitar, slide guitar, acoustic guitar
- John Williams – bass
- Frank Ray Jr. – keys
- Harold Smith – rhythm guitar
- Tony Coleman – drums
- Tauris Turner – drums (track 4)
- Marc Franklin – trumpet
- Kirk Smothers – saxophone
- Lucky Peterson – vocals, guitar, organ (track 6)
- Tommy Sims – bass (track 13), vocals (track 14)
- Felix Hernandez – percussion (track 11)
- Javier Solis – drums, percussion (tracks 13 & 14)
- Sherry Williams & John Williams – background vocals (tracks 1, 7 & 12)
- Stephanie Bolton & Sharisse Norman – backing vocals (tracks 3, 4 & 5)
- John Williams & Frank Ray Jr. – backing vocals (track 11)
- Jerard Woods & Jovaun Woods – backing vocals (track 14)
- Children choir (Jovanni Ramirez, Jerard Woods II, Justin Woods, Sarah-Clayton McBrayer, EmmyLayne Myers, Noelle Jamison, Nori Jamison) (tracks 13 & 14)

Production

- Ana Popović - production
- Tony Coleman - production
- Tommy Sims - production (tracks 13 & 14)
- Pete Matthews - engineering and mixing at Ardent recording studios (tracks 1, 2, 3, 5, 6, 8, 9, 11 & 12)
- James Waddell - engineering and mixing at Lyricanvas Studios (tracks 4, 7, 10, 13 & 14)
- Brad Blackwood - mastering
- Recorded in April and October 2012 at Ardent recording studio in Memphis, TN. Recorded in January 2013 at Lyricanvas Studios in Nashville, TN.
