= Like It on Top =

Studio album by Ana Popović
- Released: September 14, 2018
- Length: 42:27
- Label: ArtisteXclusive
- Producer: Keb' Mo', Ana Popović (executive producer)

Ana Popović chronology
Trilogy (2016)	Like It on Top (2018)	Live for Live (2020)

Professional ratings
Review scores
Source	Rating
Glide Magazine	8/10 stars

Like It on Top is Ana Popović's eighth studio album, released on September 14, 2018, on ArtisteXclusive records. The album is a concept album which explores ten different aspects of female empowerment. The album was recorded in Nashville, Tennessee, and produced by Grammy winner Keb' Mo', and features guest appearances by Keb' Mo', Kenny Wayne Shepherd, and Robben Ford.

== Track listing ==
No.	Title	Writer(s)	Length
1.	"Lasting Kind of Love" (featuring Keb' Mo')	Ana Popović, Kevin Moore	4:55
2.	"Like It on Top" (featuring Robben Ford and Keb' Mo')	Popović, Moore	4:45
3.	"Sexy Tonight" (featuring Kenny Wayne Shepherd)	Shepherd, Tommy L. Sims	3:35
4.	"Slow Dance" (featuring Robben Ford)	Popović, Moore, Mark van Meurs, Kevin So, Beth Nielsen Chapman, Graham Gouldman	6:36
5.	"Funkin' Attitude"	Popović, Moore	4:58
6.	"Last Thing I Do"	Popović, Moore, So	3:09
7.	"Virtual Ground"	Popović, Moore	3:53
8.	"Brand New Man"	Popović, Moore	3:58
9.	"Matter of Time"	Popović, Moore, So	2:53
10.	"Honey I'm Home"	Moore, Lisa Aschmann	3:45
Total length:			42:27

== Personnel ==
Musicians

- Ana Popović – vocals, guitar; slide guitar (track 9)
- Keb' Mo' – guitar (except tracks 7 and 9); resonator guitar (track 9); vocals (tracks 1 and 2)
- Robben Ford – guitar (track 2); vocals (tracks 2 and 4)
- Kenny Wayne Shepherd – guitar, vocals (track 3)
- Akil Thompson – guitar, electric guitar, acoustic guitar (except track 9)
- Eric Ramey – bass (except track 9)
- Michael B. Hicks – keyboards, Rhodes, B3 Wulitzer, background vocals (except track 9)
- Marcus Finnie – drums (except track 9)
- Roland Barber – trombone (tracks 1, 2, 5 and 7)
- Evan Cobb – saxophone (tracks 1, 2, 5 and 7)
- Josh Harner – trumpet (tracks 1, 2, 5 and 7)
- Jason Eskridge – background vocals (except tracks 8 and 9)
- Moiba Mustapha – background vocals (except tracks 3, 8 and 9)
- Kristin Kenlaw – background vocals (track 5)
- Leigh Brannon – background vocals (track 5)
- JC Morrissey – background vocals (track 5)

Production

- Ana Popović – executive producer
- Keb' Mo' – producer
- Zach Allen – recording and additional recording (of Robben Ford at StuStuStudio, Nashville, TN)
- Mills Logan – mixing (at the Mix Mill, Nashville, TN)
- Leigh Brannon – production, project manager
- Alex Jarvis – additional recording (in Nashville, TN)
- Kevin Smith – additional recording (of Kenny Wayne Shepherd at Groove Masters, Los Angeles, CA)
- Dave Gardner – mastering (at Infrasonic Mastering, Los Angeles, CA)
- Stéphane Kerrad – artwork and design (at KB Studios, Paris)
- Michael Roud – photography

== Charts ==
Chart (2018)	Peak position
Swiss Albums (Schweizer Hitparade)	97
