= Blind for Love =

Studio album by Ana Popović
- Released: July 17, 2009
- Recorded: March and April, 2009
- Genre: Electric blues, blues rock, jazz, funk, gospel
- Length: 44:55
- Label: Eclecto Groove Records
- Producer: Randy Chortkoff (executive producer), Robert Fitzpatrick (executive producer), Mark Dearnley, Ana Popović, Tony Braunagel

Ana Popović chronology
Still Making History (2007)	Blind for Love (2009)	An evening at Trasimeno Lake (2010)

Blind for Love is Ana Popović's fourth studio album, released in Europe on July 17, 2009, and in the US on July 21, 2009 on Eclecto Groove Records. The album was co-produced by Mark Dearnley, and featured members of her touring band along with members of the Phantom Blues Band. The album has only one song that is not written or co-written by Popović, "Need Your Love" by Dion Murdock, which comes out more as a rocker than a blues song. The album mixes up genres, mainly blues but branches out to rock, jazz, and funk. Two of the songs on the album focus on her family, "Blues for M" is for her man, and "Part of Me" is for her son.

== Track list ==
No.	Title	Writer(s)	Length
1.	"Nothing Personal"	Ana Popović, Mark van Meurs	3:36
2.	"Wrong Woman"	A. Popović	3:45
3.	"Steal Me Away"	A. Popović	3:31
4.	"Blind for Love"	A. Popović	3:14
5.	"More Real"	A. Popović, M. van Meurs	3:38
6.	"Putting out the APB"	A. Popović, M. van Meurs	3:48
7.	"Get Back Home to You"	A. Popović	3:34
8.	"The Only Reason"	A. Popović	3:53
9.	"Part of Me (Lullaby for Luuk)"	A. Popović, Claudia Brant	3:16
10.	"Lives That Don't Exist"	A. Popović, M. van Meurs	3:55
11.	"Need Your Love"	Dion Murdock	3:22
12.	"Blues for M"	A. Popović	5:23

== Personnel ==
Musicians

- Ana Popović – vocals, guitar
- Ronald Jonker – bass
- Andrew Thomas – drums
- Tony Braunagel – drums, percussion (track 3), background vocals (track 10)
- Lenny Castro – percussion
- Joe Sublet – saxophone
- Darrell Leonard – trumpet
- Julie Delgado, Kenna Ramsey, Billy Valentine – background vocals

Production

- Randy Chortkoff - executive producer
- Robert Fitzpatrick - executive producer
- Ana Popović - production
- Mark Dearnley - production and mixing; recording and engineering (tracks 2, 3, 5, 6, 9 & 12)
- Tony Braungael - co-production
- David Z – recording at Castle Oaks Studio, Calabasas, CA and engineering (tracks (1, 4, 7, 8, 10 & 11)
- John Porter – production and mixing (tracks 1, 3, 5, 6, 7, 8, 10 & 13)
- Robert Hadley – mastering at The Mastering Lab, Ojai, CA
- Josh Blanchard – assistant engineering
