= Lay Down Sally =

Single by Eric Clapton

from the album Slowhand
- B-side: "Cocaine"
- Released: November 1977
- Recorded: Olympic Studios in Barnes, London
- Genre: Roots rock; country rock
- Length: 3:50
- Label: RSO
- Songwriter: Eric Clapton · Marcy Levy · George Terry
- Producer: Glyn Johns

Eric Clapton singles chronology
"Carnival" (1977)	"Lay Down Sally" (1977)	"Wonderful Tonight" (1977)

Official audio
- "Lay Down Sally" on YouTube

"Lay Down Sally" is a song performed by Eric Clapton, and written by Clapton, Marcy Levy, and George Terry. It appeared on his November 1977 album Slowhand, and reached No. 3 on the Billboard Hot 100 chart.

== Background ==
"Lay Down Sally" is a country blues song performed in the style of J. J. Cale. Clapton also attributed other members of his band – Carl Radle of Oklahoma, George Terry, Jamie Oldaker and others – as influencing the song. Clapton explained, "It's as close as I can get, being English, but the band being a Tulsa band, they play like that naturally. You couldn't get them to do an English rock sound, no way. Their idea of a driving beat isn't being loud or anything. It's subtle."

Billboard magazine described Clapton's vocal as "low key but earthy" and also praised Marcy Levy's backing vocals. Cash Box praised Clapton's "guitar finesse."

The single was a crossover country music hit, reaching No. 26 in April 1978, Clapton's best showing on the Hot Country Songs chart. "Lay Down Sally" was a significant part of the soundtrack of the 2013 film August: Osage County, in which the song was played as the intro music and twice more later in the film.

== Personnel ==
- Eric Clapton – lead vocals and lead guitar
- George Terry – rhythm guitar
- Dick Sims – electric piano
- Carl Radle – bass guitar
- Jamie Oldaker – drums
- Marcy Levy and Yvonne Elliman – harmony vocals

== Charts and certifications ==
=== Weekly charts ===
Chart (1977–1978)	Peak position
Australian Singles Chart	57
Canadian Adult Contemporary	1
Canadian CHUM Singles	2
Canadian Country Singles	49
Canadian Singles Chart	3
French Singles Chart	12
Hungarian Singles Chart	2
Italian Singles Chart	38
Japanese Singles Chart	5
New Zealand Singles Chart	16
Swedish Singles Chart	8
UK Singles Chart	39
US Billboard Adult Contemporary	25
US Billboard Country Songs	26
US Billboard Hot 100	3
US Cashbox Singles	3
US Record World Singles	8

=== Year-end charts ===
Chart (1978)	Rank
Canadian Singles Chart	29
Japanese Singles Chart	81
New Zealand Singles Chart	47
US Billboard Hot 100	15
US Cashbox Singles	16

=== All-time charts ===
Chart (1958-2018)	Position
US Billboard Hot 100	564

=== Certifications ===
Region	Certification	Certified units/sales
Canada (Music Canada)	Gold	75,000^{^}
Japan (RIAJ)	Gold	
New Zealand (RMNZ)	Gold	10,000^{*}
United States (RIAA)	Gold	1,000,000^{^}
^{*} Sales figures based on certification alone.^{^} Shipments figures based on certification alone.

== Covers ==
- Red Sovine, a country singer best known for his sentimental recitations and truck-driving songs, recorded a cover version that – save for the mid-song guitar bridge – closely resembled the Clapton original. Sovine's version reached No. 70 on the Billboard Hot Country Singles chart in the summer of 1978, and was the last charting single released in his lifetime.
- Jerry Garcia Band covered the song extensively from 1990 to 1995.
- Asleep at the Wheel covered the song on their 1995 album The Wheel Keeps on Rollin'. Their version peaked at number 70 on the RPM Country Tracks chart in Canada in 1996.

== Bibliography ==
- Fuld, William (1998). The New Zealand Charts – A Red Chart? (3 ed.). Fuld Pressings.
- Hoffmann, Frank (1983). The Cash Box Singles Charts, 1950–1981. The Scarecrow Press, Inc. ISBN 978-0810815957.
- Kent, David (1993). Australian Chart Book 1970–1992. St Ives, N.S.W.: Australian Chart Book. ISBN 0-646-11917-6.
- Tatsaku, Ren (December 2011). The Oricon Sales Report (in Japanese). Tokyo, Japan: Oricon Style – Recording Industry Association of Japan.
- Wood, Gerry (October 21, 1978). "Billboard International" (PDF). Billboard Magazine. 90 (42). Nielsen Business Media, Inc. ISSN 0006-2510.
- Zameczkowski, Olivier (February 5, 1978). "Hits of the World > France" (PDF). Billboard Magazine. 90 (5). Nielsen Business Media, Inc. ISSN 0006-2510.
