= Power (Ana Popović album) =

Studio album by Ana Popović
- Released: May 5, 2023
- Genre: Rock, blues, jazz,, neo-soul
- Length: 40:15
- Label: ArtisteXclusive
- Producer: Ana Popović, Buthel

Ana Popović chronology
Live for Live (2020)	Power (2023)	Dance to the Rhythm (2025)

Professional ratings
Review scores
Source	Rating
Blues Rock Review	9/10 stars
American Songwriter	3/5 stars

Power is Ana Popović's ninth studio album, released on May 5, 2023, on ArtisteXclusive records. In the fall of 2020 during the Covid pandemic, Popović was diagnosed with breast cancer, and considered abandoning her career. Buthel Burns, her bass player and musical director, pushed her to develop the material for this album between her 14 chemotherapy sessions and flights between Los Angeles and Amsterdam. Popović collaborated with Buthel over Zoom to develop the songs. She found the creation of the music to be part of the healing process for her spirit and body. The album was about her empowerment, and pushing through to live her life to the fullest. Buthel and Popović co-produced the album, and eighteen musicians were involved in creating the album anchored by the core trio of Popović on vocals and guitars, Buthel on vocals and bass and Chris Coleman on vocals and drums.

== Track listing ==
No.	Title	Writer(s)	Length
1.	"Rise Up"	Ana Popović, Corey LaDell Burns	4:44
2.	"Power Over Me"	Popović	3:42
3.	"Doin' This"	Popović, Burns	3:38
4.	"Luv'n Touch"	Popović, Burns	4:09
5.	"Queen of the Pack"	Popović, Burns	3:28
6.	"Strong Taste"	Popović, Burns	3:35
7.	"Recipe Is Romance"	Popović, Burns	4:12
8.	"Deep Down"	Popović, Burns	3:52
9.	"Ride It"	Popović, Burns	3:51
10.	"Flicker 'n Flame"	Popović, Burns	2:40
11.	"Turn My Luck"	Popović, Burns	2:24
Total length:			40:15

== Personnel ==
Musicians

- Ana Popović – vocals, electric guitar; slide guitar, acoustic guitar
- Buthel – bass, backing vocals
- Jeff Bates – rhythm guitar (track 4)
- Joe Foster – rhythm guitar (tracks 4, 7)
- Eric Ramey – bass (except track 9)
- Jeremy Thomas – keyboards, Hammond electric organ (tracks 2, 5)
- Michele Papadia – keyboards, Hammond electric organ (tracks 1, 2, 7, 8, 9)
- Brandon Bland – Hammond electric organ (tracks 3, 4, 6)
- Chris Coleman – drums, percussion (except tracks 1, 8)
- Jerry Kelley – drums (tracks 1, 8)
- Mark Mullins – trombone (tracks 2, 4, 7, 9)
- Claudio Giovagnoli – saxophone (tracks 2, 5, 7)
- Brad Walker – tenor saxophone (tracks 2, 4, 7, 9)
- Bobby Campo – trumpet (tracks 2, 4, 7, 9)
- Davide Ghidoni– trumpet (tracks 2, 5, 7)
- Tasha Parker – background vocals (tracks 3, 4, 7, 8)
- Noel Burns – background vocals (tracks 3, 4, 7, 8)
- Jerry Kelley – background vocals (track 1)
- Nia Kelley – background vocals (track 1)
