= Kevin Bowe =

American singer-songwriter

- Born: February 27, 1961 (age 65)
- Origin: Minneapolis, Minnesota, U.S.
- Genres: Alternative rock, roots rock, blues
- Occupations: Musician, songwriter, producer
- Instrument: Guitar
- Years active: 1979–present

Kevin Bowe (born February 27, 1961) is an American songwriter, record producer and musician from Minneapolis. He is best known for his work with prominent rock and blues artists including Paul Westerberg and the Replacements; writing songs for hit albums by Jonny Lang and Kenny Wayne Shepherd; as well as Etta James' Grammy-winning Let's Roll. He has contributed to dozens of albums over his career, including several of his own as a bandleader; he has appeared on many film and television soundtracks including ESPN and The Sopranos. His songs have been covered by many prominent rock and blues artists, including Joe Cocker, Lynyrd Skynyrd, Robben Ford, and John Mayall.

== Career ==
After growing up in rural Minnesota, Bowe became part of the burgeoning rock scene in early 1980s Minneapolis which spawned Hüsker Dü and The Replacements, fronting alternative rock and Americana bands including The Dads, Summer of Love, and The Revelators. His career began when his Revelators song "Riverside" was covered by Kenny Wayne Shepherd on his platinum-selling album Ledbetter Heights leading to a songwriting contract with rock legends Jerry Leiber and Mike Stoller in 1997. Bowe discovered blues guitarist Jonny Lang, then still a teenager, at a blues jam in Fargo, North Dakota. He contributed songs for Lang's breakthrough hit albums Lie To Me in 1997 and the Grammy-nominated Wander This World in 1998. The next year, Bowe made his debut as a producer with another teenage blues guitarist, Shannon Curfman's Loud Guitars, Big Suspicions.

Bowe's most famous work has been as a songwriter for other artists. He co-wrote four songs on Etta James’ 2003 Grammy-winning album Let's Roll, including "The Blues Is My Business," which was later covered by E Street Band guitarist Little Steven Van Zandt on his solo record Soulfire. Other notable songs include "Sault Ste. Marie", covered by Three Dog Night as well as Lynyrd Skynyrd's "Dead Man Walkin'" (co-written with the band) on the 2003 album Vicious Cycle.

Bowe has a longstanding friendship and working relationship with Replacements frontman Paul Westerberg, having begun as contemporaries starting out in the Minneapolis music scene. Bowe's band The Dads were the headliners at the earliest known recorded live performance of the Replacements, at Minneapolis club Jay's Longhorn Bar in July 1980. He played guitar in Westerberg's solo touring band His Only Friends in the early 2000s, and joined the Replacements in 2012 to record the six-song EP Songs for Slim. The band also recorded at Bowe's home studio around that time, though none of the material from those sessions has yet been released.

Besides Westerberg, Bowe (often with his band Okemah Prophets) has also frequently been a touring or live backing musician for Freedy Johnston and the Jayhawks' Gary Louris. Bowe has produced records by several notable Minneapolis bands, including indie-folk band Communist Daughter's 2016 album, The Cracks That Built the Wall, and punk group Suicide Commandos' comeback album Time Bomb.

=== Work as a primary performer ===
Bowe has released five albums with his roots-rock band the Okemah Prophets, most recently Every Part of the Buffalo. 2012's Natchez Trace included a song co-written with Westerberg, "Everybody Lies," and guest performances by Westerberg, the Meat Puppets, Wilco guitarist Nels Cline; Communist Daughter's Johnny Solomon and Molly Moore; Jayhawks drummer Tim O'Reagan, Freedy Johnston, Chuck Prophet, Phil Solem of the Rembrandts, and Bob Dylan violinist Scarlet Rivera The band is named after folk singer Woody Guthrie's birthplace, Okemah, Oklahoma. The band has received critical praise for Bowe's songwriting, which No Depression magazine says is "criminally catchy."

=== Personal life ===
Bowe also taught music and audio production at Minneapolis' Institute of Production & Recording. His wife, Ruth Whitney Bowe started Fine Line Music Cafe, a Minneapolis nightclub in 1987 and owned it until 1990. The couple began dating shortly after Bowe performed at the club around the time of its opening. Prince asked her later to help him open another club in downtown Minneapolis, Glam Slam.

== Selected discography ==
=== As main performer ===
Kevin Bowe and the Okemah Prophets:

- Every Part of the Buffalo (2018, Okemah Records)
- Natchez Trace (2012, Okemah Records)
- Angels on the Freeway (2003, Corazong Records)
- Love Songs & Murder Ballads (2001, Okemah Records)
- Restoration (2000, Orchard)

The Revelators:

- Blackie Ford's Revenge (1994, Sun House Records)

=== As writer, producer or backing musician ===
- 1995: Kenny Wayne Shepherd, Ledbetter Heights (writer)
- 1997: Jonny Lang, Lie To Me (writer)
- 1998: Jonny Lang, Wander This World (writer)
- 1999: Shannon Curfman, Loud Guitars, Big Suspicions (writer, producer)
- 2000: Peter Case, Flying Saucer Blues (writer)
- 2000: Where the Heart Is (Original Soundtrack) (writer)
- 2001: John Mayall, Along for the Ride (writer)
- 2002: Ana Popović , Hush' (writer)
- 2001: The Proclaimers, Persevere (guitarist)
- 2002: Three Dog Night, Three Dog Night With the London Symphony Orchestra (writer)
- 2002: Robben Ford, Blue Moon (writer)
- 2003: Etta James, Let's Roll (writer)
- 2003: Lynyrd Skynyrd, Vicious Cycle (writer)
- 2004: Warren Brothers, Well Deserved Obscurity (writer)
- 2005: Tommy Castro, Soul Shaker (writer, producer)
- 2006: Paul Westerberg, Open Season (producer)
- 2006: John Brannen, Twilight Tattoo (writer)
- 2007: Tommy Castro, Painkiller (writer)
- 2009: Meat Puppets, Sewn Together (mixer, guitarist, dulcimer, percussion)
- 2012: Communist Daughter, Lions And Lambs (producer)
- 2012: Joe Cocker, Fire It Up (writer)
- 2012: The Replacements, Songs for Slim (guitarist)
- 2014: Tommy Castro, The Devil You Know (writer)
- 2014: Mark Boone Jr., Bang Bang (producer, guitarist)
- 2015: Communist Daughter, Sing Sad Christmas (producer)
- 2015: Tommy Castro & The Painkillers, Method to My Madness (writer)
- 2016: Communist Daughter, The Cracks That Built The Wall (producer)
- 2016: Ana Popović , Trilogy (writer)
- 2017: Steve Van Zandt, Soulfire (writer)
- 2017: Suicide Commandos, Time Bomb (producer)
