= Ana Popović =

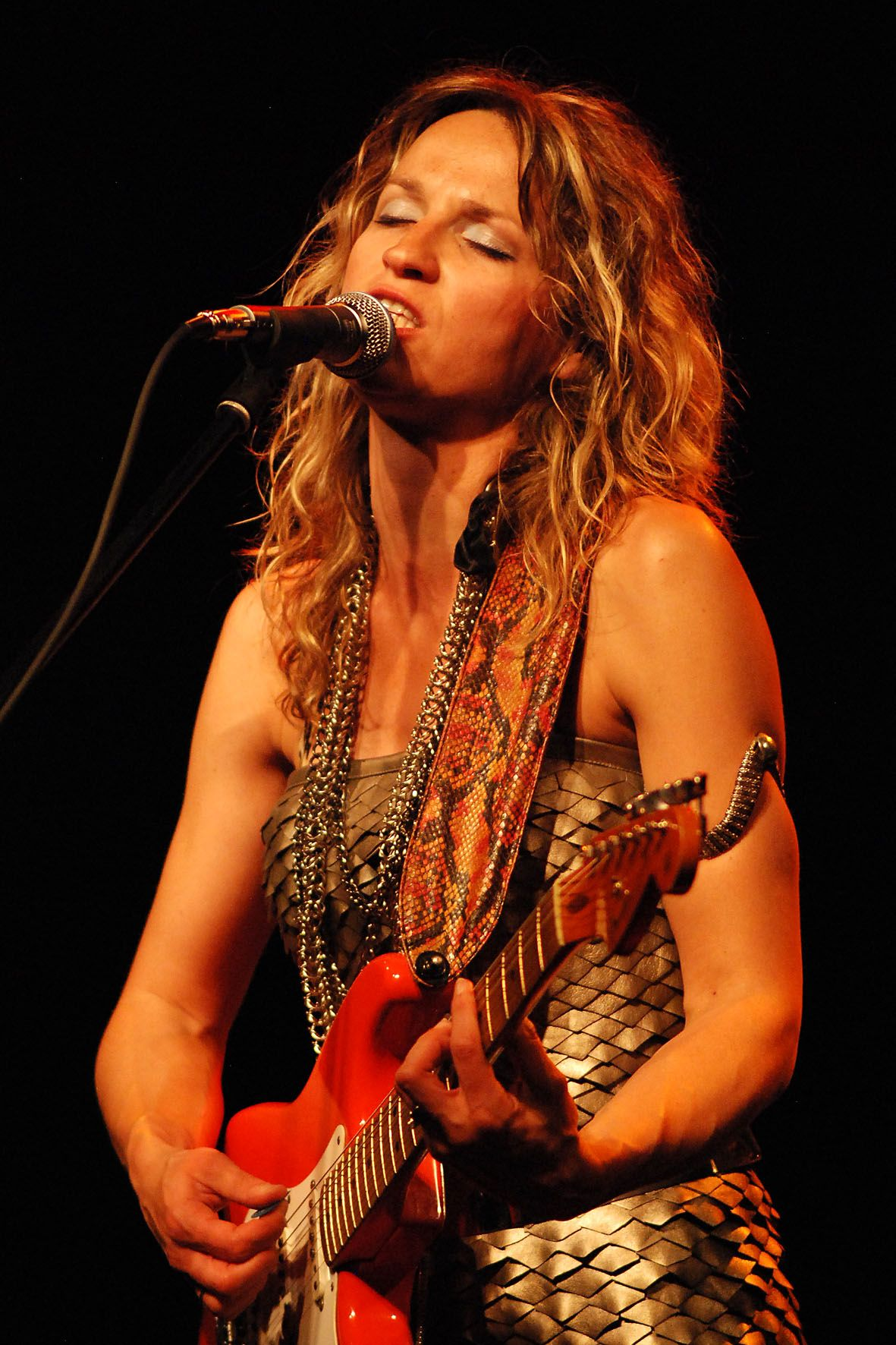

Background information
- Born: May 13, 1976 (age 50); Belgrade, SR Serbia, SFR Yugoslavia
- Genres: Blues, blues rock, soul blues
- Occupations: Musician, singer
- Instruments: Vocals, Guitar
- Years active: 1995–present
- Labels: Ruf, Eclecto Groove, ArtisteXclusive
- Formerly of: Hush
- Website: www.anapopovic.com

Ana Popović (Serbian Cyrillic: Ана Поповић, born May 13, 1976) is a blues singer and guitarist from Serbia who currently resides in the United States.

== Biography ==
=== Early life ===
Popović was born in 1976 in Belgrade. Her father (Milton Popović) introduced her to the blues, and she started to play the guitar when she was fifteen.

=== Hush (1995–1998) ===
In 1995, she formed the band Hush with Rade Popović (guitar, vocals), Milan Sarić (bass guitar) and Bojan Ivković (drums). Hush performed rhythm and blues, but also incorporated elements of funk and soul into their sound. The band had their first performance in the club Vox in Belgrade. During 1996, Hush performed across Serbia, also performing in Greece. Thanks to their performance at the Marsoni Blues Festival in Senta, Hush got the invitation to perform at the Fifth International Blues, Jazz, Rock and Gastronomic Festival in Hungary. A part of their performance was released on a live album which featured recordings from the festival. In 1996, Popović played slide guitar on Piloti album Dan koji prolazi zauvek (The Day that Is Passing Forever).

During 1998, Hush performed more than 100 times, playing in blues clubs and blues festivals. During the same year, they released their debut album, Hometown, through PGP-RTS. The album was produced by Aleksandar Radosavljević, and featured Vojno Dizdar (electric piano and Hammond organ), Petar "Pera Joe" Miladinović (harmonica), Aleksandar Tomić (tenor saxophone) and Predrag Krstić (trumpet) as guests. Beside the band's own songs, Hometown also featured covers of blues standards.

In 1998, Popović went to the Netherlands to study jazz guitar, and Hush disbanded.

=== Solo career (1999–present) ===
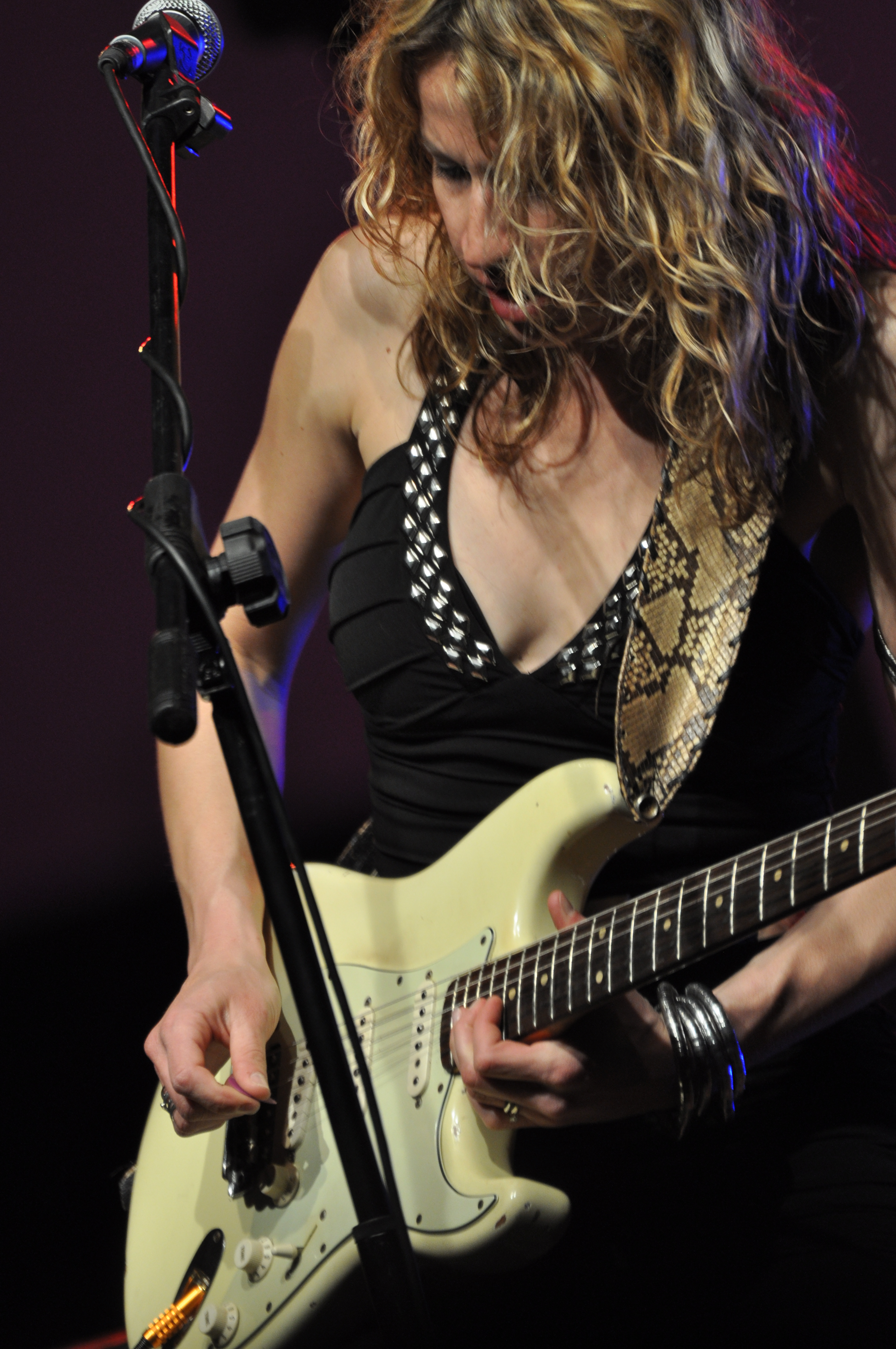
Ana Popović at the Piacenza Blues Festival in 2010

In 1999, Popović formed the Ana Popović Band in the Netherlands. In 2000, she appeared, alongside Eric Burdon, Taj Mahal, Buddy Miles, Double Trouble, Eric Gales and others, on the Jimi Hendrix tribute album Blue Haze: Songs of Jimi Hendrix with a cover of the song "Belly Button Window". In 2001, she released her solo debut, Hush!, through the German label Ruf Records. The album was recorded in Memphis, with the members of Ana Popović Band, as well as studio musicians. It was produced by Jim Gaines, who previously worked with Carlos Santana, John Lee Hooker, Alexis Korner and others. The album featured Bernard Allison as guest. The album saw large success, so Popović left her guitar studies, and dedicated herself to performing.

In 2003, Popović released her second album, Comfort to the Soul. The album, recorded in Memphis and produced by Gaines, featured a fusion of blues, rock, soul and jazz. During the same year, on the Rhythm & Blues Festival in Belgium, she was invited by Solomon Burke to join him on stage, after which she joined him on the rest of the tour as a guest. In 2005, Popović released a live album and DVD entitled Ana! Live in Amsterdam, recorded on January 30, 2005, on her concert in Amsterdam club Melkweg.

In 2007, Popović released the album Still Making History through the American record label Eclecto Groove Records. In 2009, she released the album Blind for Love, and in 2011 the album Unconditional through the same label. Both Still Making History and Unconditional reached number one in the United States Billboard Blues chart. In 2012, Popović moved to Memphis, Tennessee, and a few years later relocated to Los Angeles, California.

Popović's ninth album, Can You Stand the Heat, was released in April 2013 through ArtisteXclusive records. The album, produced by Tony Coleman, was recorded with John Williams on bass guitar, Harold Smith on rhythm guitar, Frank Ray Jr. on organ and Tony Coleman on drums. Popović performed at the 2013 New Orleans Jazz & Heritage Festival, where she introduced a new project: a nine-piece band under the name Ana Popovic & Mo' Better Love. In September 2013, Popović signed with Monterey International booking agency.

In 2014, she was nominated for a Blues Music Award in the Contemporary Blues Female Artist of the Year category.

Popović released a triple album titled Trilogy on May 20, 2016. The album includes multiple guests, including Joe Bonamassa, Robert Randolph, Cody Dickinson (North Mississippi Allstars), Bernard Purdie, and rapper Al Kapone.

Popović released her next studio album, Like It on Top on September 14, 2018. The album was recorded in Nashville, Tennessee, and produced by Keb' Mo'.

In late 2020, Popović was diagnosed with breast cancer, but continued to perform live, and also worked on her new album in between medical treatments. On May 5, 2023, Popović released Power, her first studio album in five years.

== Awards and honors ==
- 2002 Nominated for Best Singer, Best Guitarist, and Best Album at the French Blues Awards
- 2003 First European nominated for Best New Artist Debut at the W.C. Handy Awards
- 2003 Nominated for Best Blues Album at the Jammie Awards
- 2004 Winner of the Jazz a Juan Revelation award in Juan-les-Pins, France.
- 2006 Nominated for Best Blues DVD (2005), Best Live Performer, Best Female Blues Artist, and Most Outstanding Musician (guitar) at the Living Blues Awards
- 2007 Nominated for Blues Artist of the Year, BluesWax 2007, U.S.
- 2010 Nominated for Best Overseas Artist at the British Blues Awards
- 2011 Winner of Best Blues DVD at the Blues Matters Awards, UK
- 2012 Nominated for Best Contemporary Blues Album (Unconditional), Best Contemporary Blues Female Artist, and Best DVD at the 33rd Blues Music Awards
- 2014 Nominated for Contemporary Blues Female Artist of the Year, Blues Music Awards

== Discography ==
- Hometown (1998) as Hush
- Hush! (2001)
- Comfort to the Soul (2003)
- Still Making History (2007)
- Blind for Love (2009)
- Unconditional (2011)
- Can You Stand the Heat (2013)
- Blue Room (2015) with Milton Popović
- Trilogy (2016)
- Like It on Top (2018)
- Power (2023)
- Dance to the Rhythm (2025)

== DVD ==
- Ana! Live in Amsterdam (2005)
- An evening at Trasimeno Lake (2010)
- Live for Live (2020)
