= Shannon Curfman =

American rock musician

Shannon Marie Curfman (born July 31, 1985) is an American blues rock singer and guitarist.

== Career ==
Born in Fargo, North Dakota, Curfman came to prominence in 1999, at the age of 14, with the release of her first album, Loud Guitars, Big Suspicions, which she recorded a year earlier.

Curfman self-released a five-song EP entitled Take It Like a Man in July 2006, followed by the album Fast Lane Addiction in 2007. She released her third album, What You're Getting Into, in 2010.

Since 2010, Curfman has been a vocalist and guitarist with Kid Rock's backing band, Twisted Brown Trucker.

== Discography ==
=== Albums ===
- Loud Guitars, Big Suspicions (1999), Arista
- Take It Like a Man (2006), Purdy – EP
- Fast Lane Addiction (2007), Purdy
- What You're Getting Into (2010), Purdy

== Published articles about Curfman ==
NUVO Article

Rolling Stone article by David Fricke (quote from Jonny Lang)
