= Susan Marshall (musician) =

Background information
- Genres: Folk rock, pop, soul
- Instrument(s): Vocals, piano
- Website: www.susanmarshallmusic.com

Susan Marshall (born c. 1964) is an American folk rock, pop and soul vocalist, pianist, songwriter and recording artist. She is best known for her work with Mother Station, Lynyrd Skynyrd, Lenny Kravitz, The Afghan Whigs, Primal Scream, North Mississippi Allstars, Lucinda Williams, Ana Popović and Katharine McPhee.

After completing high school in Memphis Tennessee and attending theatre school, Marshall was engaged by the year-round Off-Broadway repertory company, Light Opera of Manhattan, where she performed leading roles in operettas for nearly six years. In 1990, she returned to Memphis, where she co-founded southern soul band, The Mother Station, began writing songs and soon became a backup vocalist for well-known artists, contributing vocals to dozens of albums. Her songs and collaborations have been recorded by well-known artists, and she has released three well regarded solo albums.

== Early life and education ==
Marshall was born in Utah, but during primary school she lived in Eugene, Oregon, Whittier, California and later Albuquerque, New Mexico. She exhibited musical talent as a child, which was nurtured by her musical family. Her father sang in barbershop quartets, and her grandmother was a soprano singer and pianist. Dave Meniketti of Y&T is her cousin by marriage. In 1977, she became the youngest member in the Albuquerque Civic Light Opera's production of Oklahoma!.

Just before high school, her family moved to Memphis, Tennessee, where in 1982 she graduated Germantown High School, which her parents picked for its outstanding arts department. In 1983, Marshall received a scholarship to the United States International University in San Diego, California, which she attended for one year. She then moved to New York City and attended a summer at Circle in the Square Theatre School.

== Career ==
After college, Marshall remained in New York and joined the Light Opera of Manhattan (LOOM), an Off-broadway, 52-week-per-year repertory theatre company. LOOM featured an AEA program from which Marshall received her Actor's Equity Card. Marshall remained with LOOM for more than 5 years, performing leading roles in operettas under the name Siobhan Marshall, because there was another Susan Marshall who was already a member of Actors Equity. The New York Times praised her work as the leading character Jane in the company's holiday show, Victor Herbert's Babes in Toyland: "Nolan and especially Siobhan Marshall sing and act attractively as ... Delphinia and Jane (Miss Marshall can play a cute little girl without being unbearable, which is a little unusual after all)."

In 1990, Marshall returned to Memphis and helped form the Mother Station together with guitarist Gwin Spencer, which was signed to East West Records under the Atlantic Record label. They released an album, Brand New Bag, and reached #34 on the Billboard rock charts with "Put the Blame on Me", but soon afterwards, the group disbanded. Meanwhile, Marshall met Jeff Powell, an assistant on a Lynyrd Skynyrd album produced by Tom Dowd. She auditioned for Dowd, which led to her contributing backup vocals to Skynyrd albums. Marshall was noticed by other producers, including Jim Dickinson, which led to work with Toy Caldwell. She also provided vocals for The Afghan Whigs on recordings and on tour. Background vocal sessions became a regular part of her career, and her vocals can be heard on hundreds of albums.

After Mother Station, Marshall began to write songs and play the piano. She wrote a ballad called "Back to You", which was later recorded by Reba Russell. Marshall co-wrote "How The Mighty Have Fallen" with Bill Ellis, which was recorded by Jim Gaines and Ana Popović. Popović's next record also featured one of Marshall's songs, "Love Me Again", co-written by Mike Carroll. In 2002, Marshall released her critically admired debut solo album, Susan Marshall Is Honey Mouth, and she has released two more well-regarded albums since then: Firefly (2005) and Little Red (2009). In 2005, Marshall was working with Austin Carrol and suggested that Carrol audition for ABC's The One: Making a Music Star. Together, they wrote "Better off Alone". He performed it on the show, where judge Kara DioGuardi heard it. Later, when Katharine McPhee was the American Idol runner up, DioGuardi pitched the song to McPhee, and she recorded it on her eponymous debut album, which was certified gold by RIAA.

In 2011, Marshall became the first female president of the Memphis chapter of the National Academy of Recording Arts and Sciences. In 2019, she was elected for a second term as president of The Recording Academy Memphis Chapter. In 2020, Marshall was the lead vocalist on a video cover tribute of John Prine's "Angel from Montgomery", recorded together with Recording Academy’s board members, to raise funds for the MusiCares COVID-19 Relief Fund. Marshall was elected to the Board of Trustees of the Recording Academy in 2024.

== Selected discography ==
Marshall's recording credits include over 100 albums including the following:

- 1991: Lynyrd Skynyrd – Lynyrd Skynyrd 1991 (Atlantic) (vocals)
- 1993: Cliffs of Doonen – Undertow (Critique) (vocals)
- 1994: Mother Station – Brand New Bag (Atlantic) (vocals)
- 1994: The Screamin' Cheetah Wheelies – Screamin' Cheetah Wheelies (Atlantic) (vocals)
- 1994: Primal Scream – Give Out But Don't Give Up (Sire) (vocals)
- 1994: Don Nix – Back to the Well (Icehouse) (vocals)
- 1997: Sandy Carroll – Memphis Rain (Inside Sounds) (vocals)
- 1998: The Afghan Whigs – Somethin' Hot (Columbia) (vocals)
- 1998: RiverBluff Clan – Two Quarts Low (Fat Chance) (vocals)
- 1998: Smokin' Joe Kubek – Take Your Best Shot (Bullseye Blues) (vocals)
- 1998: Lenny Kravitz – 5 (Virgin) (vocals)
- 1998: The Afghan Whigs – 1965 (Columbia) (vocals)
- 1999: Antsy McClain – Doublewide & Dangerous (Rugburn Records) (vocals)
- 1999: Big Tent Revival – Choose Life (Ardent)
- 2000: Toy Caldwell – Son of the South (Hopesong/GMV Nashville) (vocals)
- 2000: Dobie Gray – Soul Days (Cadre) (vocals)
- 2001: KC Ray – Down the River (Witch Hair Records) (vocals)
- 2001: Larry McCray – Believe It (Magnolia Records) (vocals)
- 2001: Willy DeVille – Horse of a Different Color (Import) (vocals)
- 2001: Keith Sykes – Don't Count Us Out (Syrene) (primary artist)
- 2001: North Mississippi Allstars – 51 Phantom (Blanco y Negro Records) (vocals)
- 2002: William Lee Ellis – Conqueroo (Yellow Dog Records) (songwriter/vocals)
- 2002: Sherry Leece – New Leece on Life (Stardust Nashville) (vocals)
- 2002: Ana Popović – Hush! (Ruf) (songwriter/vocals)
- 2002: Eric Jerardi – Virtual Virtue (Niche Records) (vocals)
- 2002: John McMullan – John McMullen (Kicktone) (vocals)
- 2002: Don Nix – Going Down: The Songs of Don Nix (Evidence) (vocals)
- 2002: Lynyrd Skynyrd – Turn It Up! (Sanctuary) (vocals)
- 2002: Susan Marshall – Susan Marshall is Honeymouth (Humongous) (songwriter/primary artist)
- 2003: Sid Selvidge – Little Bit of Rain (Archer Records) (vocals)
- 2003: Adam Levy – Get Your Glow On (Lost Wax Records) (primary artist/vocals)
- 2003: Rob Jungklas – Arkadelphia (Madjack Records) (vocals)
- 2003: North Mississippi Allstars – Polaris (ATO) (vocals)
- 2003: John Eddie – Who the Hell Is John Eddie? (Lost Highway/Thrill Show) (vocals)
- 2003: Ana Popović – Comfort to the Soul (Ruf) (songwriter)
- 2003: Todd Agnew – Grace Like Rain (Ardent/Epic) (vocals)
- 2004: Various Artists – In the Mood for Memphis (Inside Sounds) (Primary artist)
- 2004: Various Artists – In the Name of Love: Artists United for Africa (Militia Muzik) (vocals)
- 2005: Various Artists – Return to Sin City: A Tribute to Gram Parsons (Image Entertainment) (vocals)
- 2005: Susan Marshall – Firefly (Honeymouth) (Primary artist)
- 2005: Ana Popović – Ana! [DVD] (Ruf) (songwriter)
- 2005: Alvin Youngblood Hart – Motivational Speaker (Tone Cool) (vocals)
- 2005: Ana Popović – Ana! Live in Amsterdam (Ruf) (songwriter)
- 2005: Todd Agnew – Reflection of Something (Ardent/Epic) (vocals)
- 2005: Tony Furtado – Bare Bones (Funzalo) (vocals)
- 2005: North Mississippi Allstars – Electric Blue Watermelon (ATO) (vocals)
- 2005: Smokin' Joe Kubek – Served Up Texas Style: The Best of the Smokin' Joe Kubek Band (Bullseye Blues) (vocals)
- 2006: Robert A. Johnson – Touch (New Granada) (vocals)
- 2006: Paul Mark – Trick Fiction (Radiation Records) (vocals)
- 2006: The Bottle Rockets – Zoysia (Bloodshot) (vocals)
- 2006: Cory Branan – 12 Songs (Madjack Records) (vocals)
- 2006: Don Nix – I Don't Want No Trouble (Section Eight Productions) (vocals)
- 2006: Anthony Gomes – Music Is the Medicine (Adrenaline) (vocals)
- 2006: Devon Allman – Torch (Livewire) (vocals)
- 2006: Keith Sykes – Let It Roll (Fat Pete Records) (vocals)
- 2007: Katharine McPhee – Katharine McPhee (RCA) (songwriter)
- 2007: Barbara Blue Blues Band – By Popular Demand (Shout) (vocals)
- 2007: The Afghan Whigs – Unbreakable: A Retrospective 1990–2006 (Rhino/Elektra) (vocals)
- 2007: Terry Wall & the Wallbangers – Give Me Your Heart (Aljus Records) (vocals)
- 2008: Paul Mark – Blood and Treasure (Radiation Records) (vocals)
- 2008: Lucinda Williams – Little Honey (Lost Highway) (vocals)
- 2009: Susan Marshall – Little Red (Madjack Records) (songwriter, piano, vocals, percussion)
- 2009: Tim Easton v Porcupine (New West) (vocals)
- 2009: Klaus Voormann – A Sideman's Journey (Universal) (vocals)
- 2010: Sid Selvidge – I Should Be Blue (Archer Records) (vocals)
- 2010: Solomon Burke – Nothing's Impossible (E1 Entertainment) (vocals)
- 2010: The Hill Country Revue – Zebra Ranch (RSM) (vocals)
