= George Terry (musician) =

American guitarist

George Terry (born 1950) is an American rock and blues guitarist and songwriter best known for his work with Eric Clapton in the 1970s and as a session musician with other artists, including ABBA, the Bee Gees, Joe Cocker, Andy Gibb, Freddie King, Diana Ross, Stephen Stills, and Kenny Rogers.

== Career ==
George Terry is a South Florida guitarist, bassist, and songwriter, who began playing with several bands in the late 1960s, including GAME who released two albums in 1970 and 1971. Terry was the group's featured lead guitarist and bassist, and wrote several songs on both albums.

In 1974, while working on the album that would become 461 Ocean Boulevard, Eric Clapton hired Terry as a full-time member of his band. While the band recorded the album, Terry brought the Bob Marley and the Wailers album Burnin' to Clapton, stating he really liked the song "I Shot the Sheriff". He persuaded Clapton to record his own version of the song, which the band convinced Clapton to include on the album because they felt it had commercial potential. Terry also wrote the last track on the album, "Mainline Florida", which "breaks away from the established tone of the record" and features Clapton using a talk box. Terry's work with Clapton as a guitarist and songwriter continued through the 1970s, with Terry co-authoring the 1977 song "Lay Down Sally".

Terry worked as a session musician with numerous artists, including ABBA, the Bee Gees, Joe Cocker, Andy Gibb, Freddie King, Diana Ross, Stephen Stills, and Kenny Rogers. Some of this work came through Terry's association with Bee Gees member Barry Gibb. In 1979 he played guitar on Italian singer Ivano Fossati's album La Mia Banda Suona Il Rock, recorded at Criteria Studios in Miami.

In 1981, Terry and Kitty Woodson released the album Life. Its song "Cool Down" was released as a single. In 1983, "E.T. Phone Home", a song co-authored by Robert W. Walker, Terry, and Woodson, reached number 84 in the UK singles chart.

In 2001, the song "What'll I Do" written by Terry, was included on and released as a single from The Bellamy Brothers album The 25 Year Collection. Terry also co-produced four new tracks with the band. In 2004, Terry released a solo album entitled Guitar Drive.
