= Marcella Detroit discography =

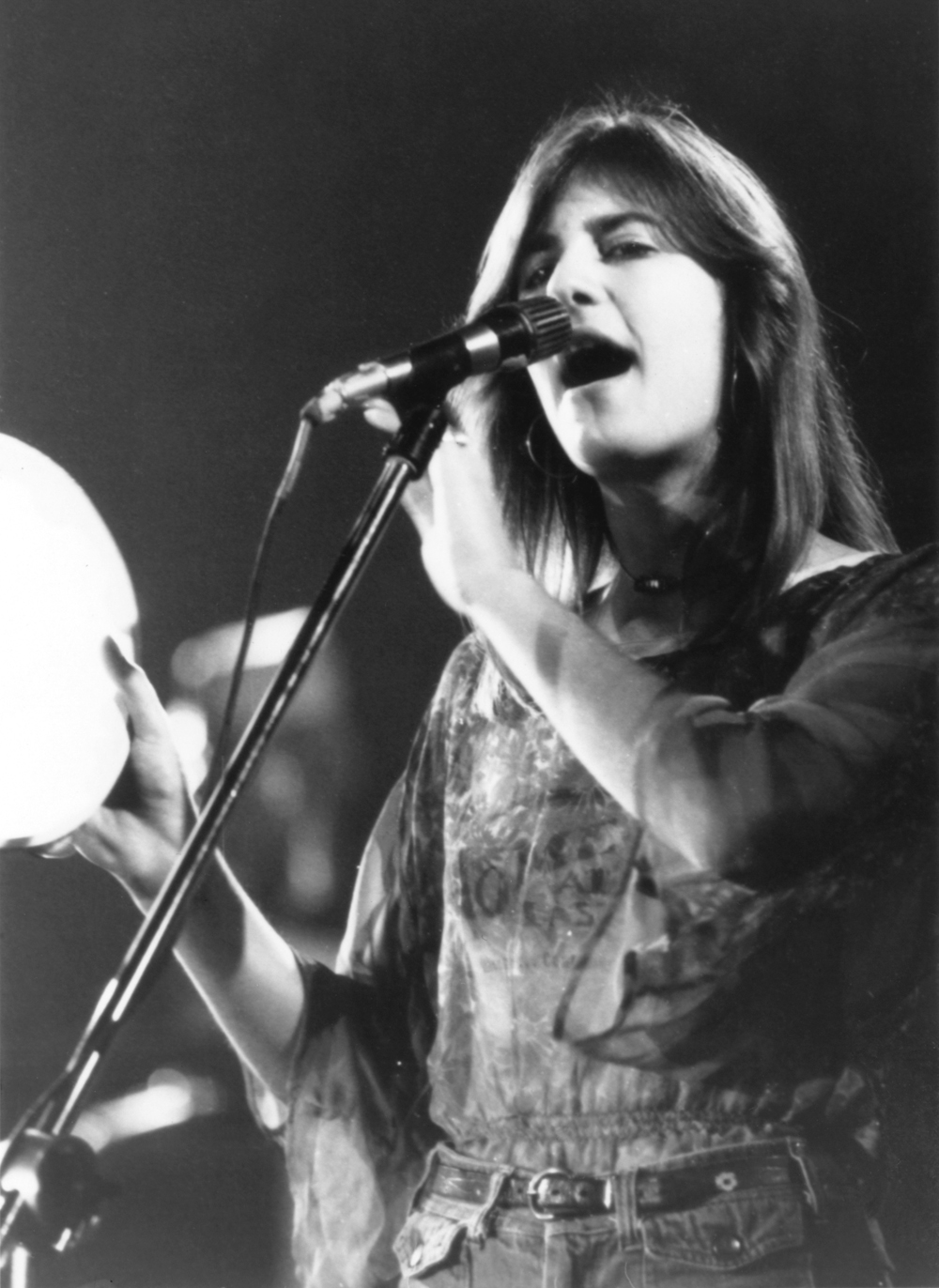
- Singing with Eric Clapton on tour; San Bernardino, California; August 15, 1975.
- Studio albums: 7
- Extended plays: 4
- Live albums: 1
- Compilation albums: 2
- Singles: 16

The discography of American recording artist Marcella Detroit consists of seven studio albums, two compilation albums, sixteen singles (including three as a featured artist), and ten other appearances. Detroit released her debut studio album Marcella in 1982 under her birth name Marcy Levy, which went largely unnoticed. She became a member of pop group Shakespears Sister in 1989, who released two studio albums in her time with the band, the second, Hormonally Yours, peaked at No. 3 on the UK Albums Chart, and was certified double platinum by the BPI. After leaving the band in 1993, Detroit released her second studio album Jewel in March 1994, which peaked at No. 15 on the UK Albums Chart, and was certified silver. The album's lead single, "I Believe", peaked at No. 11 in the UK, and reached the top ten in Australia. Her following album Feeler, released in September 1996, was less successful, although it reached No. 82 in Japan. A live album, Without Medication Plus MTV "Buzz Live" was released promotionally in Japan the same year. Detroit's first EP, Abfab Songs, was released in 1999, consisting entirely of original songs featured on Absolutely Fabulous in 1996, when Detroit guest-starred in two episodes as an angel. The same year, she released Demoz, a double-CD collection of demos through her website. Her fourth studio album Dancing Madly Sideways was released in the same fashion, and thus did not chart in any territories.

In 2002, Detroit formed a self-titled blues band, the Marcy Levy Band, who released their debut EP Button Fly Blues in 2003, followed by a full studio album The Upside of Being Down in 2006. The band broke up sometime in 2007–2008. Detroit released a Christmas EP, Happy Holiday in 2011, followed by a second holiday EP Holiday 2012 a year after. She released her fifth studio album, The Vehicle, in April 2013 through Right Recordings, her first solo album in 12 years. Her sixth studio album, and her first holiday album, For the Holidays, was released in November 2013, followed by her seventh studio album, Gray Matterz, in 2015.

== Albums ==
=== Studio albums ===
Title	Album details	Peak chart positions					Certifications
Title	Album details	AUS	JPN	SWE	SWI	UK	Certifications
Marcella^{[a]}	Released: 1982; Formats: LP; Label: Epic	—	—	—	—	—	
Jewel	Released: March 22, 1994; Formats: CD, CS, DLD, LP; Label: London	53	—	32	18	15	BPI: Silver
Feeler	Released: September 21, 1996; Formats: CD, DLD; Label: Mega, Sony	—	82	—	—	—	
Dancing Madly Sideways	Released: July 13, 2001; Formats: CD, DLD; Label: Banned	—	—	—	—	—	
The Vehicle	Released: April 22, 2013; Formats: CD, DLD; Label: Right	—	—	—	—	—	
For the Holidays	Released: November 22, 2013; Formats: DLD; Label: Make Zee	—	—	—	—	—	
Gray Matterz	Released: September 6, 2015; Formats: CD, DLD; Label: Right	—	—	—	—	—	
Gold	Released: May 22, 2021; Formats: DLD; Label: Make Zee	—	—	—	—	—	

=== Collaboration albums ===
Title	Album details
Ballerina (Diane Reeves, Marcy Levy) ^{[a]}	Released: 1985; Formats: LP; Label: BBC

=== Compilation albums ===
Title	Album details
Demoz	Released: 1999; Formats: CD; Label: Independent
The Music Sales Group Presents Marcella Detroit	Released: 2012; Formats: CD; Label: Music Sales Group
Jewel: The Original Demo Recordings	Released: March 6, 2014; Formats: CD, DLD; Label: Make Zee

=== Live albums ===
Title	Album details
Without Medication Plus MTV "Buzz Live"	Released: 1996; Formats: CD; Label: Sony Music Japan

== Extended plays ==
Title	EP details
Abfab Songs	Released: 1999; Formats: CD; Label: Independent
Limited Edition	Released: 2001; Formats: CD; Label: Banned
Happy Holiday	Released: November 23, 2011; Formats: DLD; Label: Independent
Holiday 2012	Released: November 22, 2012; Formats: DLD; Label: Independent

== Singles ==
Title	Year	Peak chart positions							Album
Title	Year	US	AUS	GER	IRE	SWE	SWI	UK	Album
"Help Me!"^{[a]} (with Robin Gibb)	1980	50	—	—	—	—	—	—	Times Square
"Close to Her"^{[a]}	1982	—	—	—	—	—	—	—	Marcella
"I Believe"	1994	—	10	81	24	18	22	11	Jewel
"Ain't Nothing Like the Real Thing" (with Elton John)	1994	—	—	—	—	—	—	24	Jewel
"I'm No Angel"	1994	—	116	—	—	—	—	33	Jewel
"Perfect World"	1995	—	—	—	—	—	—	100	Jewel
"I Hate You Now..."	1996	—	166	—	—	—	—	96	Feeler
"Somebody's Mother"	1996	—	—	—	—	—	—	—	Feeler
"Boy"	1996	—	—	—	—	—	—	83	Feeler
"Flower"	1997	—	—	—	—	—	—	—	Feeler
"Lust for Like"	2001	—	—	—	—	—	—	—	Dancing Madly Sideways
"Madison's Light"	2012	—	—	—	—	—	—	—	—N/a
"Love, Faith and Hope"	2012	—	—	—	—	—	—	—	—N/a
"Good Girl Down"	2013	—	—	—	—	—	—	—	The Vehicle
"The Vehicle"	2013	—	—	—	—	—	—	—	The Vehicle
"While We Are Sleeping"	2014	—	—	—	—	—	—	—	—N/a
"England Calling"	2015	—	—	—	—	—	—	—	Gray Matterz
"Stay"	2015	—	—	—	—	—	—	—	The Vehicle
"—" denotes a recording that did not chart or was not released in that territory.

=== As featured artist ===
Title	Year	Album
"If You Could Read My Mind" (Aurora featuring Marcella Detroit)	2002	Aurora
"Mystery to Me" (Loverush U.K. featuring Marcella Detroit)	2007	—N/a
"My Friend Misery" (Vacuum featuring Marcella Detroit)	2008	Your Whole Life Is Leading Up to This
"Paradise" (Parralox featuring Marcella Detroit)	2018	Subculture

== Promotional singles ==
Title	Year	Album
"Come and Follow Me"^{[a]} (with Max Carl)	1986	—N/a
"I Want to Take You Higher"	1994	Jewel
"You Better Be Good"	2009	Happy Holiday
"All Is Forgiven"	2010	—N/a

== Guest appearances ==
Title	Year	Album
"Millie and Billie"^{[a]} (with Alice Cooper)	1978	From the Inside
"Where Do I Go"^{[a]} (Jimmy Ruffin featuring Marcella Detroit)	1980	Sunrise
"Somebody to Love"^{[a]}	1981	American Pop
"You Knew What You Were Doing (Every Inch of the Way)"^{[a]}	1988	Mac and Me
"To Die For" (Aurora featuring Marcella Detroit)	2001	Aurora
"Some Flowers"	2002	Getting Through It
"I Wish You Love"	2005	Marry Me
"Fantasy" (The Alex Dixon Band featuring Marcella Detroit)	2009	Rising from the Bushes
"Paint You a Picture" (The Alex Dixon Band featuring Marcella Detroit)	2009	Rising from the Bushes
"Yell Cut" (with Anthony Costa, Maria Quintle, Royston Gooden, Craig Steinand and Lara Copcutt)	2012	Natasha

== Music videos ==
Title	Year
"Help Me!" (with Robin Gibb)^{[a]}	1980
"I Believe"	1994
"Ain't Nothing Like the Real Thing" (with Elton John)	1994
"I'm No Angel"	1994
"Perfect World"	1995
"I Hate You Now..."	1996
"Boy"	1996
"Flower"	1997
"Lust for Like"	2001
"All Is Forgiven"	2010
"Happy Holiday"	2011
"Yell Cut" (with Anthony Costa, Maria Quintle, Royston Gooden, Craig Steinand and Lara Copcutt)	2012
"Good Girl Down"	2013
"The Vehicle"	2013
"California Christmas"	2013

== Notes ==
a These early releases were under Detroit's birth name Marcy Levy.
