= Watch Out for Lucy =

Single by Eric Clapton

from the album Backless
- A-side: "Promises"
- Released: September 1978
- Genre: Rock and roll
- Length: 3:13
- Label: RSO
- Songwriter(s): Eric Clapton
- Producer(s): Glyn Johns

"Watch Out for Lucy" is the B-side of the single "Promises" released by the British rock musician Eric Clapton in September 1978 of his studio album Backless.

== Composition, release and success ==
The song's lyrics and music were written by Clapton, and is composed in the key of A major. Record producer Glyn Johns worked with Clapton during the recording sessions.

The song was released in September 1978 as the B-side of "Promises", from Clapton's 1978 studio album Backless. The single release charted nowhere else, other than in the United States, where it was additionally chosen by the Billboard magazine to chart on the Billboard Hot 100 singles chart. With the A-side release, the song reached eight international single charts.

Cash Box said it has a "shuffling beat, harmonica, bright electric guitar work and easy singing by Clapton and Marcy Levy. Record World suggested that "this easy-beat new release" should reach the pop and country charts as "Promises" did.

== Cover versions ==
- Australian band Stars covered the song on their 1980 album, 1157.

== Chart positions ==
=== Weekly charts ===
Chart (1979)	Peak position
US Billboard Hot 100	40
