= Chuck Sabo =

American drummer and songwriter

- Born: Charles Edward Sabo Jr. August 22, 1958 (age 67); Allentown, Pennsylvania, U.S.
- Occupation: Musician
- Instruments: Drums; percussion; bass; guitar; keyboards; vocals
- Years active: 1981–present
- Website: chucksabo.com

Charles Edward Sabo Jr. is an American drummer, musical director, songwriter, and producer who has performed and recorded with prominent artists including XTC, Natalie Imbruglia, Elton John, Tom Jones, Chaka Khan, Bryan Adams, Cher, Tina Turner, Pet Shop Boys, Billy Preston, Roy Orbison, Terence Trent D'Arby, Seal, Right Said Fred, Shakespear's Sister, Take That, Orchestral Manoeuvres in the Dark (OMD), 808 State, Tashan, Belinda Carlisle, Kiki Dee, Étienne Daho, Axel Bauer and Michel Polnareff.

== Early life ==
Chuck Sabo (Charles Edward Sabo Jr.) was born August 22, 1958, and grew up in Allentown, Pennsylvania, in a family of non-musicians. His parents supported his interest in and aptitude for playing the drums, and he began his career playing in cover bands in the Allentown area.

== Career ==
=== 1980s ===
Sabo moved to New York City in 1980 at age 21. While taking drum lessons with Sonny Igoe he worked moving furniture to subsidize his music career. In the early part of the decade he made his first significant industry connections, recording his first major label project (1982's The Eleventh Hour) with Tom Dickie and the Desires managed by Tommy Mottola.

He also played in the early 1980s in New York City with the Comateens, and his stint in NYC ended after he recorded their final album, Deal With It, in 1984. After touring Europe with the group to support the album, he decided to stay in London.

He began his UK career being offered gigs with two bands, Decadence, managed by Mick Rossey, who was also managing Flock of Seagulls, and Glasgow band Talking Drums, who were managed by Miles Copeland. He went with Talking Drums and moved to Glasgow for a short time, but soon returned to London, where he played with a number of bands and became further known on the music scene.

In 1988 he was the session drummer for Étienne Daho's album Pour Nos Vies Martiennes. The following year he toured Europe with Daho.

=== 1990s ===
Sabo played on Martyn Ware's 1991 British Electric Foundation album Music of Quality and Distinction, Vol. 2, which included recordings with Tina Turner, Chaka Khan, Terence Trent D'Arby, Billy Preston, and others. In 1992 he played on Tashan's 1992 album For the Sake of Love, produced by Ware. He toured with Shakespears Sister and played on their album Hormonally Yours as well as Right Said Fred's album Up. In 1993 he was the session drummer on Take That's album Everything Changes.

In 1994, while he was recording Marcella Detroit's album Jewel, its producer Chris Thomas arranged for Sabo to play on the last track ("Duets for One") on Elton John's Duets album. That led to sessions for The Lion King soundtrack, where Sabo played on "Circle of Life," "Can You Feel the Love Tonight," and "I Just Can't Wait to Be King." Sessions with Kiki Dee and OMD followed.

In 1996 Étienne Daho called on him again, this time for his 1996 album Eden.

In 1997 Sabo played on Natalie Imbruglia's hit Grammy-winning RCA album Left of the Middle and toured with Imbruglia supporting it.

=== 21st century ===
In 2000, Sabo played on XTC's final studio album, Wasp Star (Apple Venus Volume 2). His work the following year included Jimmy Nail's album Ten Great Songs and an OK Voice, and a return engagement with Imbruglia for her second album, White Lilies Island.

The success of the Natalie Imbruglia project and others enabled Sabo and his then-wife Jeanette Landry to set up a home studio, where among other projects they wrote and recorded with singer Sally Ann Marsh, who was later signed to Jive Records. Her success led them to a publishing deal with Dalmatian Songs in the U.K. and with BMG in the rest of the world.

In 2007 he joined the drum faculty of the Institute of Contemporary Music Performance in London.

In 2019 he released three singles, "This Cowboy Ain't Going Home," "The Politician," and "Keep Running Forever," in advance of his forthcoming debut album Running the Human Race and a single ("Dark & Rainy Street") co-produced by Chris Thomas.

== Select discography ==
Song or Album	Artist	Year
"Killer"	Seal	2005
White Lilies Island	Natalie Imbruglia	2001
"The Way You Make Me Feel"	Bryan Adams/Ronan Keating	2000
Wasp Star	XTC	2000
Left of the Middle	Natalie Imbruglia	1997
Universal	OMD	1996
Can You Feel the Love Tonight	Elton John	1994
Jewel	Marcella Detroit	1994
"Babe"	Take That	1993
Up	Right Said Fred	1992
Hormonally Yours	Shakespear's Sister	1992
Seal	Seal	1991
Music of Quality and Distinction, Vol. 2	British Electric Foundation	1991
Pour Nos Vies Martiennes	Étienne Daho	1988
Deal With It	Comateens	1984

== Collaborations ==
With David Knopfler

- 1986 Cut the Wire

With Michel Polnareff

- 1990 Kāma-Sūtra

With Elton John

- 1993 Duets

With Marcella Detroit

- 1994 Jewel
- 1996 Feeler

With Natalie Imbruglia

- 1997 Left of the Middle
- 2001 White Lilies Island
- 2005 Counting Down the Days

With Ronan Keating

- 2000 Ronan

With Melanie C

- 2012 Stages
