= Jewel (Marcella Detroit album) =

Studio album by Marcella Detroit
- Released: March 22, 1994
- Recorded: 1993–1994
- Genres: R&B; pop; rock
- Labels: London; Polydor K.K.
- Producer: Chris Thomas

Marcella Detroit chronology
Marcella (1982)	Jewel (1994)	Feeler (1996)

Singles from Jewel
- 1. "I Believe" Released: February 28, 1994; 2. "Ain't Nothing Like the Real Thing" Released: May 2, 1994; 3. "I'm No Angel" Released: July 4, 1994; 4. "Perfect World" Released: March 6, 1995

Jewel is the second studio album by American singer Marcella Detroit, and her first since leaving band Shakespears Sister. It was released in March 1994 under London Records to moderate commercial success.

== Critical reception ==
Professional ratings
Review scores
Source	Rating
AllMusic	3/5 stars
Cash Box	(favorable)
Entertainment Weekly	B−
Knoxville News Sentinel	3.5/5 stars
Music Week	4/5 stars

Aaron Badgley from AllMusic gave the album a retrospective mixed review, saying, "The CD sounds formulaic and overproduced by Chris Thomas. He seems to steer Marcella into mid-'90s dance grooves, which does not always fit her own distinctive sound ... When she is left alone and not "produced", the results are stunning." Johnny Huston of Entertainment Weekly also gave Jewel a mixed review, commenting, "Branching away from her work with Shakespear's Sister, her solo debut Jewel suffers from drab Motown and Sly Stone covers and from a Godfather of Soul impression that's more embarrassing than subversive. Alan Jones from Music Week named it Pick of the Week, writing, "Versatility is the name of the game here, as Detroit tackles pop, rock and funk with equal voracity displaying her expressive and wide vocal range. Literate, tongue-in-cheek lyrics and well-honed pop melodies abound."

== Track listing ==
All tracks written by Marcella Detroit, except where noted.

Standard edition
No.	Title	Writer(s)	Length
1.	"Jewel"		4:13
2.	"I Believe"		4:52
3.	"Perfect World"		4:52
4.	"Art of Melancholy"		4:27
5.	"James Brown"		4:46
6.	"Detroit"		3:55
7.	"Ain't Nothing Like the Real Thing" (with Elton John)	Nickolas Ashford, Valerie Simpson	3:55
8.	"I'm No Angel"		4:14
9.	"I Want to Take You Higher"	Sly Stone	3:31
10.	"You Don't Tell Me Everything"		3:37
11.	"Cool People"		3:32
12.	"Out of My Mind"	Lance Aston	4:23
13.	"Prima Donna"		1:56

Japanese edition
No.	Title	Length
14.	"Shadow"	3:44

== Personnel ==
- Marcella Detroit – vocals
- Phil Manzanera – guitar
- Phil Spalding – bass; guitar on "Jewel", "Detroit" and "Ain't Nothing Like the Real Thing"; backing vocals on "Jewel", "Art of Melancholy", "I'm No Angel" and "You Don't Tell Me Everything"
- Chuck Sabo – drums
- Matthew Vaughan – programming

with:

- Elton John – duet vocals on "Ain't Nothing Like the Real Thing"
- Jools Holland – Hammond B-3 organ on "James Brown", piano on "Detroit"
- Chris Thomas – flute on "I Believe", keyboards on "Detroit", "Ain't Nothing Like the Real Thing" and "Shadow", harpsichord on "You Don't Tell Me Everything", percussion on "Ain't Nothing Like the Real Thing", drum programming on "Prima Donna"
- James "Sparks" Sinclair – guitar on "I Want to Take You Higher" and "Out of My Mind"
- Gavyn Wright – strings on "James Brown" and "Out of My Mind"
- George Robertson, Harry Montague-Mason, Jim Mcleod – strings on "Art of Melancholy"
- Anthony Cleeth – cello on "Art of Melancholy"
- David Theodore – oboe on "Art of Melancholy"
- The Grange Junior Choir – choir on "I'm No Angel"

== Singles ==
"I Believe" was released as the lead single in February 1994, and reached No. 11 on the UK Singles Chart. The song also found similar success internationally, peaking at No. 10 in Australia, and No. 24 in Ireland. In 2005, the song was covered by German singer Joana Zimmer as her debut single, and was more successful in some territories than the original. The second single, "Ain't Nothing Like the Real Thing", a duet with Elton John, was originally included on John's album Duets, and was released as a single in May 1994. The song peaked at No. 24 in the UK. The third single "I'm No Angel" peaked at No. 33, and the fourth, "Perfect World", at No. 100.

== Jewel: The Original Demo Recordings ==
In 2014, Detroit independently released a compilation of the original demos recorded for the album. The 15 tracks comprise the demos for 9 of the 13 album tracks, demos for 4 B-sides, and two unreleased songs: "Second Class Citizen" and "Love and Destruction". The version of "Prima Donna" is an extended version with additional lyrics.

Track listing

1. "Art of Melancholy" – 4:26
2. "Break the Chain" – 3:46
3. "Cool People" – 3:36
4. "Crucify Me" – 3:49
5. "Detroit" – 4:16
6. "I Believe" – 4:33
7. "I'm No Angel" – 4:10
8. "Jewel" – 2:55
9. "Love and Destruction" – 3:54
10. "Monday Morning" – 4:08
11. "Perfect World" – 5:20
12. "Second Class Citizen" – 4:08
13. "You Don't Tell Me Everything" – 3:38
14. "You Own the Moon" – 4:18
15. "Prima Donna" – 2:46

== Charts ==
Chart performance for Jewel
Chart (1994)	Peak position
Australian ARIA Albums Chart	53
Swedish Albums Chart	32
Swiss Albums Chart	18
UK Albums Chart	15
Scottish Albums (Official Charts)	24

Chart performance for Jewel (30th Anniversary Edition)
Chart (2024)	Peak position
Scottish Albums (Official Charts)	39
UK Album Sales Chart(OCC)	47

== Certifications ==
Region	Certification	Certified units/sales
United Kingdom (BPI)	Silver	60,000^{^}
^{^} Shipments figures based on certification alone.
