= Duets (Elton John album) =

Live album by Elton John and various artists
- Released: 22 November 1993
- Recorded: March 1991 – October 1993
- Studios: Ocean Way Recording, Conway Recording Studios, Capitol Studios and A&M Studios (Hollywood, California); Schnee Studio (North Hollywood, California); Wonderland Studios and Skip Saylor Recording (Los Angeles, California); Record One (Sherman Oaks, California); Tarpan Studios (San Rafael, California); Soundtrack Studios (New York City, New York); Bosstown Recording Studios (Atlanta, Georgia); Woodland Digital (Nashville, Tennessee); Sol Studios (Cookham, Berkshire, UK); The Town House (London, UK); Olympic Studios (Barnes, West London, UK); Wembley Arena (Wembley Park, London, UK); Metropolis Studios (Chiswick, West London, UK)
- Genres: Rock; pop
- Length: 74:39
- Labels: MCA (US); Rocket (UK)
- Producer: Various (see below)

Elton John chronology
Rare Masters (1992)	Duets (1993)	The Lion King: Original Motion Picture Soundtrack (1994)

Singles from Duets
- 1. "True Love" Released: 8 November 1993; 2. "Don't Go Breaking My Heart" Released: 14 February 1994; 3. "Ain't Nothing Like the Real Thing" Released: 2 May 1994

Professional ratings
Review scores
Source	Rating
AllMusic	2/5 stars
Calgary Herald	C+
The Encyclopedia of Popular Music	2/5 stars
Music Week	5/5 stars
Philadelphia Inquirer	2/4 stars

Duets is the first collaborative studio album by British musician Elton John, released in 1993. The album debuted at No. 7 in the UK. In the US, it peaked at number 25 on the Billboard 200 chart and was certified platinum in January 1994 by the RIAA.

Duets was released on a single CD, a single cassette and also as a double vinyl LP in the UK, with a slightly different running order. It was initially a Christmas project of John's, but that soon grew into an album of its own (Elton John's Christmas Party). The live version of "Don't Let the Sun Go Down on Me" with George Michael, track number 15 on the album, had already become a No. 1 hit on both the US Billboard Hot 100 and the UK singles chart in 1991. This is one of only three albums released between 1983 and 2016 without John's regular guitar player, Davey Johnstone.

Three singles were released from the album in Britain: "True Love" (with Kiki Dee, reached No. 2), "Don't Go Breaking My Heart" (with RuPaul, reached No. 7), and "Ain't Nothing Like the Real Thing" (with Marcella Detroit, reached No. 24).

== Track listing ==
=== CD edition ===
No.	Title	Writer(s)	Producer(s)	Length
1.	"Teardrops" (with k.d. lang)	Cecil Womack, Linda Womack	Greg Penny	4:55
2.	"When I Think About Love (I Think About You)" (with P.M. Dawn)	Attrell Cordes	P.M. Dawn	4:34
3.	"The Power" (with Little Richard)	Elton John, Bernie Taupin	Greg Penny, Elton John	6:25
4.	"Shakey Ground" (with Don Henley)	Jeffrey Bowen, Al Boyd, Eddie Hazel	Don Henley	3:52
5.	"True Love" (with Kiki Dee)	Cole Porter	Narada Michael Walden, Louis Biancaniello	3:35
6.	"If You Were Me" (with Chris Rea)	Chris Rea	Chris Rea	4:26
7.	"A Woman's Needs" (with Tammy Wynette)	John, Taupin	Barry Beckett	5:19
8.	"Old Friend" (with Nik Kershaw)	Nik Kershaw	Nik Kershaw	4:17
9.	"Go On and On" (with Gladys Knight)	Stevie Wonder	Stevie Wonder	5:50
10.	"Don't Go Breaking My Heart" (with RuPaul)	John, Taupin	Giorgio Moroder	5:00
11.	"Ain't Nothing Like the Real Thing" (with Marcella Detroit)	Nickolas Ashford, Valerie Simpson	Chris Thomas	3:36
12.	"I'm Your Puppet" (with Paul Young)	Spooner Oldham, Dan Penn	Steve Lindsey	3:36
13.	"Love Letters" (with Bonnie Raitt)	Edward Heyman, Victor Young	Don Was	4:01
14.	"Born to Lose" (with Leonard Cohen)	Ted Daffan	Lindsey	4:33
15.	"Don't Let the Sun Go Down on Me" (live, with George Michael)	John, Taupin	George Michael	5:48
16.	"Duets for One"	John, Chris Difford	Elton John, Stuart Epps, Greg Penny	4:52
Total length:				74:39

=== LP edition ===
Side one
No.	Title	With	Length
1.	"Teardrops"	k.d. lang	4:55
2.	"When I Think About Love (I Think About You)"	P.M. Dawn	4:34
3.	"The Power"	Little Richard	6:25
4.	"Shakey Ground"	Don Henley	3:51
Total length:			19:45

Side two
No.	Title	With	Length
1.	"True Love"	Kiki Dee	3:34
2.	"If You Were Me"	Chris Rea	4:26
3.	"A Woman's Needs"	Tammy Wynette	5:18
4.	"Don't Let the Sun Go Down on Me" (Live)	George Michael	5:46
Total length:			19:04

Side three
No.	Title	With	Length
1.	"Old Friend"	Nik Kershaw	4:15
2.	"Go On and On"	Gladys Knight	5:50
3.	"Don't Go Breaking My Heart"	RuPaul	5:00
4.	"Ain't Nothing Like the Real Thing"	Marcella Detroit	3:36
Total length:			18:41

Side four
No.	Title	With	Length
1.	"I'm Your Puppet"	Paul Young	3:36
2.	"Love Letters"	Bonnie Raitt	4:01
3.	"Born to Lose"	Leonard Cohen	4:33
4.	"Duets for One"		4:52
Total length:			17:02

== Personnel ==
Information is based on the album's liner notes:

=== Musicians ===
- Elton John – vocals, keyboards (1), acoustic piano (3, 7, 13), Roland RD-1000 digital piano (16)
- Etyenne Lytel – keyboards (2)
- Guy Babylon – keyboards (3)
- Greg Wells – organ (3)
- Scott Plunkett – keyboards (4)
- Louis Biancaniello – keyboards (5), synthesizers (5), programming (5)
- Max Middleton – keyboards (6)
- Chris Rea – keyboards (6), guitars (6, 16)
- Phil Naish – synthesizers (7)
- Nik Kershaw – all instruments (8)
- Stevie Wonder – all instruments (9), programming (9)
- Derrick Perkins – programming (9)
- Herald Klosser – keyboards (10), programming (10)
- Giorgio Moroder – sequencer programming (10)
- Thomas Shobel – sequencer programming (10)
- Marcella Detroit – keyboards (11), guitars (11), harmonica (11)
- Matthew Vaughan – programming (11)
- Greg Phillinganes – acoustic piano (12)
- Jim Cox – organ (12, 14), acoustic piano (14)
- Robbie Buchanan – keyboards (13), string programming (13)
- Billy Preston – Hammond B3 organ (13)
- Chris Cameron – keyboards (15)
- Dave Clayton – keyboards (15)
- Mark Taylor – keyboards (16)
- Jamie Perkins – extra keyboards (16)
- Dean Parks – guitars (1, 3, 14, 16), lap steel guitar (14)
- Michael Thompson – guitars (4)
- Corrado Rustici – mandolin (5)
- Dann Huff – electric guitar (7)
- Don Potter – acoustic guitar (7)
- Paul Franklin – steel guitar (7)
- Paul Jackson Jr. – guitars (12)
- Mark Goldenberg – guitars (13)
- Bonnie Raitt – slide guitar (13)
- Martin Bliss – guitars (15)
- Danny Jacob – guitars (15)
- Nathan East – bass guitar (1, 3)
- Neil Stubenhaus – bass guitar (4)
- Michael Rhodes – bass guitar (7)
- Mike Knapp – TB-303 bassline (10)
- Phil Spalding – bass guitar (11)
- Freddie Washington – bass guitar (12)
- James "Hutch" Hutchinson – bass guitar (13)
- Ray Brown – bass guitar (14)
- Deon Estus – bass guitar (15)
- Malcolm Foster – bass guitar (16)
- Curt Bisquera – drums (1, 3)
- John Robinson – drums (4)
- Martin Ditcham – drums (6), percussion (6, 16)
- Eddie Bayers – drums (7)
- Chuck Sabo – drums (11, 16)
- Ed Greene – drums (12)
- Ricky Fataar – drums (13)
- John Guerin – drums (14)
- Jonathan Moffett – drums (15)
- Luis Conte – congas (12)
- Alan Estes – bells (12), tambourine (12), vibraphone (12)
- Danny Cummings – percussion (15)
- Dan Higgins – baritone saxophone (3)
- Joel Peskin – tenor saxophone (3), tenor sax solo (3)
- Steve Grove – horns (saxophones) (12)
- Lon Price – horns (saxophones) (12)
- Greg Smith – horns (saxophones) (12)
- Stephen Kupka – baritone saxophone (13)
- Brandon Fields – tenor saxophone (13)
- Plas Johnson – saxophone solo (14)
- Andy Hamilton – saxophone (15)
- Bill Reichenbach Jr. – trombone (3)
- Lee Thornburg – horns (trombone, trumpet) (12), trombone (13), trumpet (13)
- Gary Grant – trumpet (3)
- Jerry Hey – trumpet (3)
- Bill Churchfield – horns (trumpet) (12)

Guest and Backing vocalists

- k.d. lang – vocals (1)
- P.M. Dawn – vocals (2)
- Michelle Johnson – backing vocals (2)
- Portia Neeley-Rolle – backing vocals (2)
- Little Richard – vocals (3)
- Andraé Crouch – backing vocals (3)
- Sandra Crouch – backing vocals (3)
- Andraé Crouch Singers – backing vocals (3)
- Don Henley – vocals (4)
- Kiki Dee – vocals (5)
- Sandy Griffith – backing vocals (5)
- Claytoven Richardson – backing vocals (5)
- Chris Rea – vocals (6)
- Tammy Wynette – vocals (7)
- Kelli Bruce – backing vocals (7)
- Kathy Burdick – backing vocals (7)
- Connye Florence – backing vocals (7)
- Yvonne Hodges – backing vocals (7)
- Nik Kershaw – vocals (8)
- Gladys Knight – vocals (9)
- Kimberly Brewer – backing vocals (9)
- Lynne Fiddmont-Linsay – backing vocals (9)
- Stevie Wonder – backing vocals (9)
- RuPaul – vocals (10)
- Linda McCrary-Campbell – backing vocals (10)
- Marietta Waters – backing vocals (10)
- Marcella Detroit – vocals (11)
- Paul Young – vocals (12)
- Johnny Britt – backing vocals (12)
- Jim Gilstrap – backing vocals (12)
- Phil Perry – backing vocals (12)
- Bonnie Raitt – vocals (13)
- Leonard Cohen – vocals (14)
- George Michael – vocals (15)
- Jay Henry – backing vocals (15)
- Shirley Lewis – backing vocals (15)
- Lynn Mabry – backing vocals (15)
- Candy Mckenzie – backing vocals (16)
- Beverley Skeete – backing vocals (16)
- Precious Wilson – backing vocals (16)

Music arrangements

- Arif Mardin – string arrangements and conductor (1)
- Jerry Hey – horn arrangements (3)
- Andraé Crouch – vocal arrangements (3)
- Louis Biancaniello – arrangements (5)
- Michael Gibbs – string arrangements and conductor (5)
- Narada Michael Walden – rhythm and vocal arrangements (5)
- Nik Kershaw – arrangements (8)
- Stevie Wonder – arrangements (9)
- Lee Thornburg – horn arrangements (12)
- David Campbell – string arrangements (12, 13), string conductor (12), horn arrangements (13)
- Mort Lindsey – arrangements (14), string arrangements and conductor (14)
- Steve Lindsey – arrangements (14)
- George Michael – arrangements (15)

== Production ==
- Steve Brown – executive producer
- Ray Cooper – executive producer
- Elton John – executive producer
- Greg Penny – supervisor
- Lisa Louie – album coordinator
- Connie Pappas-Hillman – album coordinator
- Sam Stell – album coordinator
- Debra Johnson – production coordinator (1, 3, 4, 10)
- Toby Taibi – production coordinator (4)
- Janice Lee – production coordinator (5)
- Cynthia Shiloh – production coordinator (5)
- Kevin Walden – production coordinator (5)
- Stephanie Andrews – project manager (9)
- Julie Larson – production coordinator (12, 14)
- Carrie McConkey – production coordinator (13)
- Jane Oppenheimer – minister of information (13)
- Brian Aris – chairs and back cover photography, photography of Elton John
- Brad Branson, Mark Contratto, Paul Cox, Robert Goldstein, Stephen Harvey, Dominique Issermann, Harry Langdon, Sophie Muller, Hideo Odia, Albert Sanchez, Randee St. Nicholas, Allan Titmuss, Albert Watson and Firooz Zahedi – photography of various guest artists
- John Reid – management

Technical credits

- Chris Bellman – mastering at Bernie Grundman Mastering (Hollywood, California)
- Jon Ingoldsby – recording (1, 3), mixing (1, 3)
- Michael Fossenkemper – engineer (2), mixing (2)
- Ron Jacobs – engineer (4)
- David Frazer – recording (5), mixing (5)
- Stuart Epps – engineer (6, 16)
- Csaba Petocz – engineer (7)
- Mark Evans – engineer (8)
- Van Arden – engineer (9), mixing (9)
- Brian Reeves – engineer (10), mixing (10)
- Chris Lang – mix consultant (10)
- David Nicholas – engineer (11)
- Paul McKenna – engineer (12)
- Gabe Veltri – engineer (12, 14), mixing (12)
- Bill Schnee – mixing (12, 14)
- Ed Cherney – engineer (13), mixing (13)
- Chris Porter – engineer (15)
- Jim Champagne – additional recording (3), assistant engineer (12, 14)
- Marc Reyburn – additional engineer (5)
- Frank Wolf – additional engineer (13)
- Steve Holroyd – assistant engineer (1, 3)
- Dominick Barbera – assistant engineer (2)
- Todd Childress – assistant engineer (2)
- Matt Still – assistant engineer (2, 3), vocal recording (10)
- Billy Gabor – assistant engineer (3)
- Thomas Rickert – assistant engineer (3)
- Rail Rogut – assistant engineer (3)
- Brian Scheuble – assistant engineer (4)
- Pete Lewis – assistant engineer (5)
- Jim DeMain – assistant engineer (7)
- Amy Hughes – assistant engineer (7)
- Shaun De Feo – assistant engineer (11)
- John Hendrickson – assistant engineer (12, 14)
- Dan Bosworth – assistant engineer (13)
- Ben Wallach – assistant engineer (13)
- Charlie Paakkari – assistant engineer (14)
- R.R. Harlan – digital editing (9)
- Pete Fausone – digital editing (10)

== Charts ==
=== Weekly charts ===
Weekly chart performance for Duets
Chart (1993–1994)	Peak position
Australian Albums (ARIA)	12
Austrian Albums (Ö3 Austria)	1
Canada Top Albums/CDs (RPM)	14
Dutch Albums (Album Top 100)	32
Finnish Albums (The Official Finnish Charts)	35
German Albums (Offizielle Top 100)	10
Hungarian Albums (MAHASZ)	13
Italian Albums (Musica e Dischi)	3
New Zealand Albums (RMNZ)	16
Norwegian Albums (VG-lista)	3
Scottish Albums (Official Charts)	36
Swedish Albums (Sverigetopplistan)	20
Swiss Albums (Schweizer Hitparade)	3
UK Albums (Official Charts)	5
US Billboard 200	25

=== Year-end charts ===
1993 year-end chart performance for Duets
Chart (1993)	Position
UK Albums (OCC)	15

1994 year-end chart performance for Duets
Chart (1994)	Position
Austrian Albums (Ö3 Austria)	29
German Albums (Offizielle Top 100)	82
Swiss Albums (Schweizer Hitparade)	22

== Certifications ==
Certifications for Duets
Region	Certification	Certified units/sales
Australia (ARIA)	Gold	35,000^{^}
Austria (IFPI Austria)	Platinum	50,000^{*}
Canada (Music Canada)	Platinum	100,000^{^}
Denmark (IFPI Danmark)	Platinum	80,000^{^}
France (SNEP)	2× Gold	200,000^{*}
Japan	—	30,000
New Zealand (RMNZ)	Platinum	15,000^{^}
Norway (IFPI Norway)	Platinum	50,000^{*}
Spain (Promusicae)	Platinum	100,000^{^}
Switzerland (IFPI Switzerland)	Platinum	50,000^{^}
United Kingdom (BPI)	Platinum	300,000^{^}
United States (RIAA)	Platinum	1,000,000^{^}
^{*} Sales figures based on certification alone.^{^} Shipments figures based on certification alone.
