= Land of Fortune =

Studio album by Stars
- Released: June 1979
- Genre: Country Rock, rock
- Label: Mushroom Records
- Producer: Ern Rose

Stars chronology
Paradise (1977)	Land of Fortune (1979)	1157 (1980)

Singles from Land of Fortune
- 1. "In and Out of Love/Song for the Road" Released: January 1979; 2. "Land of Fortune / Innocent Bystanders" Released: May 1979; 3. "Wasted Words/ Never Coming Back" Released: September 1979; 4. "Last of the River Boats/ Gold Fever" Released: November 1979

Land of Fortune is the second and final studio album by Australian country rock music group Stars. Released in June 1979, the album peaked at number 35 on the Australian charts, remaining on the chart for 17 weeks.

== Track listing ==
Vinyl/cassette (L 36935) Side one
No.	Title	Writer(s)	Length
1.	"Land of Fortune"	Mal Eastick	3:59
2.	"Redneck Boogie"	Andrew Durant	3:44
3.	"Gold Fever"	Eastick	3:57
4.	"Last of the Riverboats"	Durant	3:31
5.	"Innocent Bystanders"	Durant	4:06

Side two
No.	Title	Writer(s)	Length
1.	"Wasted Words"	Durant	4:59
2.	"In and Out of Love"	Stars	2:56
3.	"All Good Things Will Come to You in Time"	Durant	1:12
4.	"I'm Ready"	Willie Dixon	5:40
5.	"Never Coming Back"	Eastick	6:11

== Charts ==
Chart (1979)	Peak position
Australian Kent Music Report	35

== Release history ==
Country	Date	Format	Label	Catalogue
Australia	June 1979	LP	Mushroom Records	L 36935
Australia	19 August 2011	Compact Disc, digital download	Warner Music Australia	5249876732
