= Don't Go Breaking My Heart =

1976 duet by Elton John and Kiki Dee

Single by Elton John and Kiki Dee
- B-side: "Snow Queen"
- Released: 25 June 1976
- Recorded: 27 March 1976 (musicians and Elton John's vocals); May 1976 (backing vocals)
- Studio: Eastern Sound, Toronto, Canada (musicians and Elton John's vocals); Marquee Studios, London, England (Kiki Dee's vocals and backing vocals)
- Genre: Pop; disco
- Length: 4:31
- Label: Rocket (UK); MCA (US)
- Songwriters: Elton John; Bernie Taupin (Note: John and Taupin were credited under the pseudonyms "Ann Orson" and "Carte Blanche", respectively, and intended as an affectionate pastiche of the Motown style)
- Producer: Gus Dudgeon

Elton John singles chronology
"Pinball Wizard" (1976)	"Don't Go Breaking My Heart" (1976)	"Sorry Seems to Be the Hardest Word" (1976)

Kiki Dee singles chronology
"Once a Fool" (1975)	"Don't Go Breaking My Heart" (1976)	"First Thing in the Morning" (1977)

Music video
- "Don't Go Breaking My Heart" on YouTube

"Don't Go Breaking My Heart" is a duet by the English musician Elton John and the English singer Kiki Dee, released by The Rocket Record Company on 25 June 1976. It was written by John with Bernie Taupin under the pseudonyms "Ann Orson" and "Carte Blanche", respectively, and intended as an affectionate pastiche of the Motown style, notably the various duets recorded by Marvin Gaye and singers such as Tammi Terrell and Kim Weston. John and Taupin originally intended to record the song with Dusty Springfield, but ultimately withdrew the offer; Springfield's partner Sue Cameron later said this was because she was too ill at the time.

Unlike many of John's singles from the 1970s, it was never included on an original album (although it would later be included on the 1995 Mercury Records reissue of John's 1975 album Rock of the Westies). In the same year, John and Taupin received the 1976 Ivor Novello award for Best Song Musically and Lyrically.

In 1994, John released the song as a duet with American drag queen RuPaul. It was produced by Giorgio Moroder and reached number three on the US Billboard Dance Club Songs chart, reached number seven on the UK singles chart and number one in Iceland.

== Reception ==
Critical reception to the song in the UK was mixed. In NME, Phil McNeill stated that "they're both quite good singers, but it's a pity that Orson and Blanche didn't write a more memorable song than this, which jogs along harmlessly". Jonh Ingham of Sounds commented that the record was "not exactly Marvin and Diana". He said that the song had "a well executed arrangement" but that ultimately "all is pale compared to previous work". In Record Mirror, Rosalind Russell wrote that it was "not the stunner I'd expected from two ace singers", but that "the arrangements (strings and things) were good and the two voices go well together".

In the US, Cash Box said that "there are some great harmonies in the chorus" and that John and Dee "seem perfectly wedded in this tune." Record World called it "a duet of rare simplicity and charm with James Newton-Howard's strings practically dancing out of the grooves."

== Chart performance ==
"Don't Go Breaking My Heart" was the first No. 1 single in the UK for both John and Kiki Dee, topping the chart for six weeks in mid 1976. John would not enjoy a solo British chart-topper until "Sacrifice" in 1990. It also became his sixth No. 1 single in the US, topping the Billboard Hot 100 for four weeks and spent one week on the Easy Listening chart. Billboard ranked it as the No. 2 song for 1976, giving him his second consecutive appearance in the Billboard Year-end Top 3. In the U.S., it has been certified 2x platinum by the Recording Industry Association of America. After this duet with Dee, John failed to have another US solo number one single until "Candle in the Wind 1997". This 21-year period included two intervening number one hits in America with musical partners: "That's What Friends Are For" by Dionne & Friends in 1986, and a 1992 re-make of John's "Don't Let the Sun Go Down on Me" with George Michael credited as a duet.

In 1977, John guest-starred on The Muppet Show and performed the track with Miss Piggy. In 1985, John and Dee performed the track to the crowd at Wembley Stadium during John's set at Live Aid (where Dee sang backup). In 1988, John appeared with Minnie Mouse on the NBC special Totally Minnie miming to the track. He performed the track with Alan Partridge (Steve Coogan) at the 2001 British Comedy awards. He also performed it with the Spice Girls on his ITV tribute programme An Audience with ... Elton John.

In June 2013, 37 years after its original release, the single reached one million sales in the UK.

== "Snow Queen" ==
The B-side, "Snow Queen", was inspired by Bernie Taupin's failed attempt at romance with Cher. The lyrics express a personal condemnation, portraying Cher as being primarily concerned with "a wardrobe of gowns, TV ratings, a fragile waist, and a name." During the fadeout of the song, John quotes past Sonny & Cher hits "I Got You Babe" and "The Beat Goes On", as well as the solo Cher song "Bang Bang (My Baby Shot Me Down)".

"Snow Queen" remained unavailable on CD outside Australia until April 2019, when it was included as a bonus track on the reissue of Kiki Dee's Cage the Songbird album, included in the 5-CD box set The Rocket Years. In May 2019 it was also included on the 3-CD box set Gold, a retrospective of Dee's career spanning various labels. In 2020, it was also included on Elton John's 8-CD box set Jewel Box.

== Personnel ==
Based on information on the Elton John official website.

- Elton John – lead vocals and backing vocals, electric piano
- Kiki Dee – lead vocals and backing vocals
- James Newton Howard – acoustic piano and orchestral arrangements
- Caleb Quaye – electric guitar
- Kenny Passarelli – bass
- Roger Pope – drums
- Ray Cooper – tambourine, congas and bongos
- Kiki Dee, Curt Boettcher, Cindy Bullens, Ken Gold, Jon Joyce – uncredited backing vocals

== Charts ==
=== Weekly charts ===
Chart (1976)	Peak position
Australia (Kent Music Report)	1
Austria (Ö3 Austria Top 40)	8
Belgium (Ultratop 50 Flanders)	3
Canada (Steede Report)	1
Canada Top Singles (RPM)	1
Canada Adult Contemporary (RPM)	1
Finland (Suomen virallinen lista)	23
Ireland (IRMA)	1
Netherlands (Dutch Top 40)	2
Netherlands (Single Top 100)	3
New Zealand (Recorded Music NZ)	1
Norway (VG-lista)	5
Rhodesia (Lyons Maid)	1
South Africa (RISA)	1
Sweden (Sverigetopplistan)	3
Switzerland (Schweizer Hitparade)	4
UK Singles (Official Charts)	1
US Billboard Hot 100	1
US Adult Contemporary (Billboard)	1
West Germany (GfK)	5

=== Year-end charts ===
Chart (1976)	Rank
Australia (Kent Music Report)	5
Brazil (Crowley)	6
Canada Top Singles (RPM)	4
Netherlands (Dutch Top 40)	24
Netherlands (Single Top 100)	18
New Zealand (Recorded Music NZ)	2
South Africa (RISA)	3
UK Singles (OCC)	2
US Billboard Hot 100	2
US Easy Listening (Billboard)	23

=== All-time charts ===
Chart	Position
UK Singles (OCC)	150

== Certifications and sales ==
Region	Certification	Certified units/sales
Australia (ARIA)	Gold	50,000^{^}
Austria (IFPI Austria)	Platinum	100,000^{*}
Canada (Music Canada)	Platinum	150,000^{^}
Denmark (IFPI Danmark)	Platinum	90,000^{‡}
Italy (FIMI)	Gold	50,000^{‡}
New Zealand (RMNZ)	5× Platinum	150,000^{‡}
United Kingdom (BPI)	2× Platinum	1,029,242
United States (RIAA)	2× Platinum	2,000,000^{‡}
^{*} Sales figures based on certification alone.^{^} Shipments figures based on certification alone.^{‡} Sales+streaming figures based on certification alone.

== Elton John and RuPaul version ==
"Don't Go Breaking My Heart"

Single by Elton John and RuPaul

from the album Duets
- B-side: "Donner Pour Donner"; "A Woman's Needs"
- Released: 14 February 1994
- Genre: House; disco
- Length: 4:59
- Label: Rocket; MCA
- Songwriters: Ann Orson; Carte Blanche
- Producer: Giorgio Moroder

Elton John singles chronology
"True Love" (1993)	"Don't Go Breaking My Heart" (1994)	"Ain't Nothing Like the Real Thing" (1994)

RuPaul singles chronology
"Little Drummer Boy" (1993)	"Don't Go Breaking My Heart" (1994)	"Snapshot" (1996)

Music video
- "Don't Go Breaking My Heart" on YouTube

In 1994, Elton John and American drag queen RuPaul released the song as a duet. It was produced by Giorgio Moroder and released on 14 February 1994, by Rocket and MCA Records, as the third single from John's first collaboration album, Duets (1993).

The song reached number three on the US Billboard Dance Club Play chart. In Europe, it peaked at number-one in Iceland and within the top 10 in Portugal and the UK, the top 20 in Denmark, Ireland and Italy, and the top 30 in Austria, France and Switzerland. On the Eurochart Hot 100, "Don't Go Breaking My Heart" peaked at number 18 in March 1994. Outside Europe, the song reached number 39 in New Zealand, number 45 in Australia, and number 92 on the Billboard Hot 100 in the US.

=== Critical reception ===
AllMusic editor Stephen Thomas Erlewine described the song as a "kitschy number". Larry Flick from Billboard magazine wrote that John recreates his classic Kiki Dee duet with "the world's favorite drag queen. Revamped quasi-rave/hi-NRG version of the track is way stronger than the less-than-pleasing mix on John's current collection, rendering it a formidable contender for action on both dancefloors and radio. Oodles of good fun." Dave Sholin from the Gavin Report commented, "Thanks to producer Giorgio Moroder, there's a few more beats per minute, as well as a hilarious video, and a super performance of a great tune."

Alan Jones from Music Week gave it a score of four out of five, calling it "somewhat soulessly produced" and a "smash-bound but tacky remake". John Kilgo from The Network Forty stated that this remake of the previous number-one smash "is for real..." Sam Wood from Philadelphia Inquirer viewed it as "a campy techno remake" of John's 1977 hit. Tom Doyle from Smash Hits gave it one out of five, saying that the music "sounds like it was done with the help of a Gameboy running low on batteries". Charles Aaron from Spin wrote, "If I'd known he was gearing up for world domination, I never would've given Ru so much guff for his café au lait complexion, blond ambition, and cosmetic tinkering. Keep those techno bon mots coming. Star booty forever."

=== Music video ===
A music video was produced to promote the single, featuring Elton John and RuPaul, directed by Randy Barbato.

=== Track listing ===
CD single, Europe (1994)
No.	Title	Length
1.	"Don't Go Breaking My Heart"	4:59
2.	"Donner Pour Donner"	4:25

CD single, UK (1994)
No.	Title	Length
1.	"Don't Go Breaking My Heart"	4:59
2.	"Donner Pour Donner"	4:24
3.	"A Woman's Needs"	5:16

CD maxi, US (1994)
No.	Title	Length
1.	"Don't Go Breaking My Heart" (Remix)	6:56
2.	"Don't Go Breaking My Heart" (MK Mix)	7:19
3.	"Don't Go Breaking My Heart" (Serious Rope 12")	6:39
4.	"Don't Go Breaking My Heart" (Roger's Dub Mix)	7:06

=== Charts ===
==== Weekly charts ====
Chart (1994)	Peak position
Australia (ARIA)	45
Austria (Ö3 Austria Top 40)	25
Belgium (Ultratop 50 Flanders)	33
Denmark (IFPI)	11
Europe (Eurochart Hot 100)	18
Europe (European AC Radio)	21
Europe (European Hit Radio)	18
France (SNEP)	30
Germany (GfK)	62
Iceland (Íslenski Listinn Topp 40)	1
Ireland (IRMA)	15
Israel (Israeli Singles Chart)	9
Netherlands (Dutch Top 40 Tipparade)	5
Netherlands (Single Top 100)	34
New Zealand (Recorded Music NZ)	39
Quebec (ADISQ)	44
Scotland (OCC)	14
Switzerland (Schweizer Hitparade)	28
UK Singles (Official Charts)	7
UK Airplay (Music Week)	7
UK Club Chart (Music Week)	61
US Billboard Hot 100	92
US Dance Club Songs (Billboard)	3
US Dance Singles Sales (Billboard)	10

==== Year-end charts ====
Chart (1994)	Position
Iceland (Íslenski Listinn Topp 40)	17
UK Singles (OCC)	108
US Dance Club Play (Billboard)	36

== Other versions ==
In 2005 Ol' Dirty Bastard and Macy Gray paired up to perform a cover version for his album A Son Unique.

In October 2010, Lea Michele and Cory Monteith covered the song during the second season of Glee in the episode Duets.

The musical comedy troupe the Capitol Steps recorded a parody of the song, in which then-President George W. Bush is told by his wife Laura, "Don't go faking you're smart".

John's 2022 song "Hold Me Closer" (featuring Britney Spears) interpolates elements of the song.

A cover by Lulu & Levon appears in Just Dance 2026 Edition.
