= 1157 (album) =

Live album by Stars
- Released: July 1980
- Recorded: 18 October 1979
- Studio: Bombay Rock, Melbourne
- Genre: Country rock, rock
- Label: Mushroom Records

Stars chronology
Land of Fortune (1979)	1157 (1980)

1157 is the first and only live album by Australian country rock music group Stars. The album was recorded at Bombay Rock in Melbourne in October 1979 and released in July 1980, following band member Andrew Durant's death on 6 May 1980. The album peaked at number 46 on the Australian charts, remaining on the chart for 8 weeks.

== Track listing ==
Vinyl/cassette (L 37389) Side one
No.	Title	Writer(s)	Length
1.	"Watching the River Flow"	Bob Dylan	3:59
2.	"Living a Lie"	Andrew Durant	3:19
3.	"Cocaine"	J. J. Cale	3:24
4.	"I’d Rather Be Blind"	L Russell	3:38
5.	"Paradise"	Durant	3:09
6.	"Watch Out for Lucy"	Eric Clapton	3:23

Side two
No.	Title	Writer(s)	Length
1.	"Mainline Florida"	Clapton	3:44
2.	"Since You’ve Been Gone (Sweet, Sweet Baby)"	Aretha Franklin, Teddy White	3:16
3.	"Jive Town"	Durant	3:21
4.	"Rescue Me"	Smith, Miner	3:03
5.	"Never Coming Back"	Malcolm Eastick	5:43

== Charts ==
Chart (1980)	Peak position
Australian Kent Music Report	46
