= The Vehicle =

Studio album by Marcella Detroit
- Released: 22 April 2013
- Genres: Pop, Rock, Indie, Blues
- Label: Right

Marcella Detroit chronology
Holiday 2012 (2012)	The Vehicle (2013)	For the Holidays (2013)

Singles from The Vehicle
- 1. "Good Girl Down" Released: 22 April 2013; 2. "The Vehicle" Released: 15 September 2013

The Vehicle is the fifth studio album by American musician Marcella Detroit, released in April 2013 under Right Recordings.

== Background ==
After signing with European printed music publisher Music Sales Group, Detroit was paired with producer Larry Klein to work on Detroit's first studio album since Dancing Madly Sideways in 2001, which resulted in the creation of the album Skin I'm In, which is currently due for release in 2014. During these sessions, Klein took a six-month break from production. Detroit felt she "didn't want to stop", and in 16 days self-produced The Vehicle, which she describes as her "pet project". Following this, Klein and Detroit completed work on Skin I'm In. After "a longtime friend" played The Vehicle for Universal-based record label Right Recordings, Detroit was signed to the label, under whom the album was released in April 2013. The album's lead single, "Good Girl Down" was released on the same day as the album, with the title track being released as the second single in September 2013. As of November 2013, Detroit is also working on her autobiography, also titled "The Vehicle".

== Track listing ==
No.	Title	Length
1.	"Love X a Million"	3:49
2.	"Goddess In Despair"	4:07
3.	"Good Girl Down"	4:13
4.	"Practice What I Preach"	3:44
5.	"The Key"	4:34
6.	"Be the Change"	3:45
7.	"Look No Further"	3:40
8.	"Serious"	4:37
9.	"The Vehicle"	4:13
10.	"My Own Backyard"	4:56
11.	"Wrong Direction"	4:28
12.	"Find the Good"	3:37
13.	"Stay 2013"	4:29
