= Andrew Durant (musician) =

- Born: Andrew MacLeish Durant; 2 October 1954
- Origin: Adelaide, South Australia, Australia
- Died: 6 May 1980 (aged 25) Melbourne, Victoria, Australia
- Genres: Country rock
- Occupation: Musician-songwriter
- Instruments: Guitar, harmonica, vocals, mandolin
- Years active: 1972–1979
- Formerly of: Astra Kahn, Stars

Andrew MacLeish Durant (2 October 1954 – 6 May 1980) was an Australian musician-songwriter. He was a member of country rock group Stars (1976–79) providing guitar, harmonica, and backing vocals. He was also a session and backing musician for a range of artists. He died of cancer, aged 25. On 19 August 1980 a tribute performance was held in his honour, with a live double-album recorded by various artists, Andrew Durant Memorial Concert, which was released on 9 March 1981. All but three tracks were written by Durant (and two of those were co-written by Durant). It peaked at No. 8 on the Australian Kent Music Report Albums Chart and reached No. 40 on the End of Year Top 100 Albums Chart for 1981.

== Biography ==
Andrew MacLeish Durant was born in 1954. Durant grew up in an Adelaide beach suburb with an older sister who was in a "very folkie vocal group – she had a stunning voice". He attended Brighton High School, alongside his girlfriend, Bronte Seidel. In 1968 Durant was inspired by his copy of The Band's debut album, Music from Big Pink. In 1972 on lead guitar he founded a group, Astra Kahn, in Adelaide which included Glyn Dowding on drums, Malcolm Eastick on guitar and vocals and Wayne Gibson on bass. By 1974 the group disbanded when Durant left Australia to travel overseas. Meanwhile Dowding, Eastick and Gibson formed a hard rock covers band, Flash, which in May 1975 became the country rock band, Stars.

In August 1976 Durant was back in Australia and joined Stars, which had relocated to Melbourne and, alongside Dowding and Eastick, included Mick Pealing on lead vocals (ex-Flight, Nantucket, Flash) and Graham Thompson on bass guitar. According to Australian musicologist, Ian McFarlane, Durant "added a great deal to the band's strengths, becoming the major songwriter in the group". He wrote their third single, "Mighty Rock" (August 1977), which peaked at No. 47 on the Australian Kent Music Report Singles Chart.

Durant also wrote "Look After Yourself" (November), which became Stars' highest charting single at No. 30. The group's debut album, Paradise was released in December. Durant wrote seven of its ten tracks, including two further singles, "Back Again" (April 1978) and "West is the Way" (June). In June 1979 they issued their second studio album, Land of Fortune, by that time Durant had been diagnosed with melanoma. Stars' last gig on 18 October 1979, at the Bombay Rock Hotel, was recorded for their live album, 1157. Andrew Durant died of cancer on 6 May 1980, aged 25.

1157 appeared in July and was dedicated to Durant. Eastick organised a tribute performance on 19 August 1980 at the Palais Theatre in his honour; lead vocalists included Pealing, Jimmy Barnes, Renée Geyer, Ian Moss, and Broderick Smith; musicians included former Stars band mates Dowding on drums and percussion; Eastick on guitar; Thompson on bass guitar; as well as Ric Formosa on slide guitar, guitar and piano; John-James Hackett on drums and percussion; Glyn Mason on guitar and vocals; Mick O'Connor on organ; Billy Rogers on saxophone; Kerryn Tolhurst on guitar and steel guitar; and Don Walker on piano.

A live double-album recorded by various artists, Andrew Durant Memorial Concert, was released on 9 March 1981. All but three tracks were written by Durant. It peaked at No. 8 on the Australian Kent Music Report Albums Chart and reached No. 40 on the End of Year Top 100 Albums Chart in 1981. Profits from the album's sales went to the Andrew Durant Cancer Research Foundation. Highlights from the performance were broadcast on TV by Channel 7. A VHS was also issued.

Aside from Stars, Durant was a session and backing musician for a range of artists. He provided rhythm guitar for Richard Clapton's seventh album, Dark Spaces (August 1980), which was dedicated to Durant. In late 1979 after Stars disbanded, Eastick had joined Broderick Smith's Big Combo. Durant, Eastick and Smith co-wrote "I Was Here", which appeared on Broderick Smith's Big Combo (November 1981).

In May 2008 a 2× DVD package also titled, The Andrew Durant Memorial Concert, compiled material from the original tribute concert VHS and a live performance from 1978. Off the Record reviewed the release, which highlights "the strength of Durant's song writing and the fact that, had he lived, he might have gone on to carve himself a niche in Australia's Pantheon of great writers". While "[the] sound, however, has been digitally remastered and is superb. There are also interviews with Mal Eastick, Mick Pealing and Sarah Morgan (who ran the fan club)". In 2012 Durant's former girlfriend, Bronte Seidel donated his mandolin to her ex-neighbour, Chris White, "to make sure it got played". White wrote and recorded "Andy's Mandolin" using the instrument.

== Soundtrack ==
The Andrew Durant Memorial Concert

Chart (1980)	Peak position
Australia (Kent Music Report)	8
