= Promises (Eric Clapton song) =

Single by Eric Clapton

from the album Backless
- B-side: "Watch Out for Lucy"
- Released: September 1978
- Genre: Rock; soft rock; pop
- Length: 3:00
- Label: RSO
- Songwriter(s): Richard Feldman · Roger Linn
- Producer(s): Glyn Johns

Eric Clapton singles chronology
"If I Don't Be There by Morning" (1978)	"Promises" (1978)	"Cocaine" (1980)

"Promises" is a song written by Richard Feldman and Roger Linn and recorded by British singer and guitarist Eric Clapton in September 1978. It appears on Clapton's studio album Backless.

== Release ==
"Promises" was released as a 7-inch vinyl single in the United States, Canada, the Netherlands, Belgium, Germany, Australia, France, Spain, the United Kingdom and Italy in September 1978. With the age of digital music, the song is available as a digital music download in nearly every country. Besides being released as a single, the track appears on various compilation albums including Timepieces: The Best of Eric Clapton (1982), Backtrackin' (1984), The Cream of Eric Clapton (1987), Crossroads (1988), The Cream of Clapton (1995) and Complete Clapton (2007). In total, the title has been released on over 15 albums.

== Chart performance ==
In the United States, "Promises" reached No. 9 on the Billboard Hot 100 singles chart, as well as peaking at No. 6 on the magazine's Adult Contemporary chart. It also reached No. 82 on the Top Country Singles chart. The B-side, "Watch Out for Lucy" was subsequently promoted to radio reaching No. 40 on the Hot 100 singles chart. In Canada, the single ranked at No. 7 on the national singles chart and reached No. 24 on the Adult Contemporary chart. Additionally, it charted up to No. 12 on the CHUM charts in Canada. In New Zealand, a re-entry reached No. 35 on the country's official music chart.

In the United Kingdom, "Promises" peaked at No. 37. In the Netherlands the song reached No. 40 on the Top 100 singles chart and stayed on the list for seven weeks. It also reached No. 3 on the Dutch Top 40 "Tip Parade" (songs bubbling under the main top 40). In France, the album was listed under the artist name "Eric Clapton & His Band" and peaked at No. 71. In Australia, the song peaked at No. 26. In Norway, the release peaked at No. 1 on the Country singles chart, which had been introduced that year and was removed from the VG-lista in 1980.

== Composition and critical reception ==
"Promises" consists of four verses, two choruses and an ending. The song is in the key of G major and backing vocals were performed by Marcy Levy. Billboard called "Promises" a "swaying, melodic rocker" that sometimes sounds like Clapton's earlier hit "Lay Down Sally." Record World said that it "is largely acoustic with smooth and easy vocals." AllMusic critic William Ruhlmann called the song an "understated pop shuffle" and noted the writing credits of Richard Feldman and Roger Linn. Ruhlmann then went on to criticize that Backless and the song "Promises" are not "memorable recordings" of Clapton.

German music journalist Steffen Greifswald wrote in his review for the Frankfurter Allgemeine Zeitung: "Backless is a good recording for music lovers and of course Eric Clapton fanatics. One recording definitely sticks out – the song "Promises" has integrity, soul and passion. The track therefore perfectly sums up Eric Clapton and his work."

== Chart history ==
=== Weekly charts ===
Chart (1978–1979)	Peak position
Australia (ARIA)	26
Canada (CHUM)	12
Canadian Adult Contemporary (RPM)	24
Canadian Top Singles (RPM)	7
Netherlands (Single Top 100)	40
New Zealand (Recorded Music NZ)	35
Norwegian Country Singles (VG-lista)	1
UK Singles (OCC)	37
US Adult Contemporary (Billboard)	6
US Billboard Hot 100	9
US Top Country Singles (Billboard)	82

=== Year-end charts ===
Chart (1978)	Position
Canadian Top Singles (RPM)	149
Norwegian Country Singles (VG-lista)	23

Chart (1979)	Position
Canadian Top Singles (RPM)	80
US Billboard Hot 100	82

== Other versions ==
- Hank Williams Jr. recorded the song on his 1984 album Major Moves.
- Jerry Reed recorded the song on his 1983 album Ready.
