= Paradise (Stars album) =

Studio album by Stars
- Released: December 1977
- Recorded: April–September 1977
- Venue: Palais Theatre, Melbourne
- Studio: Armstrongs, Melbourne
- Genre: Country rock; rock
- Length: 47:17
- Label: Mushroom
- Producer: Beeb Birtles, Ric Formosa

Stars chronology
Paradise (1977)	Land of Fortune (1979)

Singles from Paradise
- 1. "Mighty Rock" Released: June 1977; 2. "Look After Yourself" Released: November 1977; 3. "Back Again" Released: March 1978; 4. "West is the Way" Released: June 1978

Paradise is the debut studio album by Australian country rock music group, Stars, released in December 1977 via Mushroom Records, which peaked at number 14 on the Australian Kent Music Report Albums Chart, remaining in the chart for 20 weeks. The line-up was Glyn Dowding on drums (ex-Astra Kahn, Flash), Andrew Durant on lead vocals and guitar (ex-Astra Kahn), Malcolm Eastick on lead guitar (ex-Astra Kahn, Flash), Roger McLachlan on bass guitar (ex-Little River Band) and Mick Pealing on lead vocals (ex-Flight, Nantucket, Flash).

The lead single from the album, "Mighty Rock", appeared in June 1977 while the group toured Australia supporting Joe Cocker. It was produced by Beeb Birtles (of Little River Band) and reached the Kent Music Report Singles Chart top 50. In August McLachlan replaced bass guitarist, Michael Hegerty who was recorded on the single's two tracks (ex-Richard Clapton Band). "Look After Yourself", followed in November, which peaked at No. 30 – their highest charting single. A third single, "Back Again", appeared in March 1978 with the fourth single, "West Is the Way", released in June of that year. The album includes a live cover version of Joe Walsh's "Rocky Mountain Way", which was recorded on 22 September 1977 at the Palais Theatre, Melbourne.

== Track listing ==
Vinyl/cassette (L 36470) Side one
No.	Title	Writer(s)	Length
1.	"Back Again"	Andrew Durant	4:13
2.	"Let's Get Moving"	Durant	4:08
3.	"Paradise"	Durant	3:26
4.	"Jupiter Creek"	Durant, Malcolm Eastick	3:33
5.	"Mighty Rock"	Durant	3:08
6.	"West is the Way"	Durant	5:01

Side two
No.	Title	Writer(s)	Length
1.	"Song for the Road"	Durant	4:15
2.	"No Time for Crying"	Eastick	4:49
3.	"Look After Yourself"	Durant	3:42
4.	"Rocky Mountain Way"	Joe Walsh, Joe Vitale, Rocke Grace, Kenny Passarelli	11:02

== Charts ==
Chart (1978)	Peak position
Australian Kent Music Report	14

== Release history ==
Country	Date	Format	Label	Catalogue
Australia	December 1977	LP	Mushroom Records	L 36470
Australia	1992	Compact disc, cassette	Mushroom Records	D19533
Australia	19 August 2011	Compact disc, digital download	Warner Music Australia	5249876742

== Personnel ==
Stars

- Glyn Dowding – drums
- Andrew Durant – backing vocals, lead vocals ("West Is the Way"), guitars (acoustic, electric)
- Malcolm Eastick – guitars (lead, talkbox, slide, acoustic)
- Roger McLachlan – bass guitar (except "Mighty Rock", "Jupiter Creek")
- Mick Pealing – lead vocals (except "West Is the Way")
- Michael Hegerty – bass guitar ("Mighty Rock", "Jupiter Creek")

Recording details

- Beeb Birtles – producer ("Mighty Rock", "Jupiter Creak")
- Ric Formosa – producer at Armstrongs, Melbourne

Credits.
