= Backless =

Studio album by Eric Clapton
- Released: November 1978
- Recorded: 1978
- Studios: Olympic, London
- Genre: Rock
- Length: 41:01
- Label: RSO
- Producer: Glyn Johns

Eric Clapton chronology
| Slowhand (1977) | Backless (1978) | Just One Night (1980) |

Singles from Backless
- 1. "Promises" Released: September 1978; 2. "Watch Out for Lucy" Released: September 1978

Backless is the sixth solo studio album by Eric Clapton, released in November 1978. Produced by Glyn Johns, and released by RSO Records, Backless reached no. 8 on the pop charts. While the single "Promises" only reached no. 37 on the UK Singles Chart, it was a much bigger success in the US, reaching no. 9 on the Billboard Hot 100. The follow-up single, "Watch Out for Lucy", was the B-side of "Promises", but reached no. 40 on the Billboard 100 on its own merit. It was Clapton's last studio album to feature his longtime bassist Carl Radle, who died in 1980.

== Critical reception ==
Professional ratings
Review scores
| Source | Rating |
|---|---|
| AllMusic | 3.5/5 stars |
| Christgau's Record Guide | B− |
| The Rolling Stone Album Guide | 3.5/5 stars |

The Globe and Mail noted that "there is none of the old spectacular playing—the emphasis is definitely on mellow funkiness—but the duet he plays on 'Roll It' with singer Marci Levy has some eloquent licks all the same."

== Track listing ==
Side one

1. "Walk Out in the Rain" (Bob Dylan, Helena Springs) – 4:16
2. "Watch Out for Lucy" (Eric Clapton) – 3:26
3. "I'll Make Love to You Anytime" (J. J. Cale) – 3:23
4. "Roll It" (Clapton, Marcy Levy) – 3:42
5. "Tell Me That You Love Me" (Clapton) – 3:31

Side two

1. "If I Don't Be There by Morning" (Dylan, Springs) – 4:38
2. "Early in the Morning" (Traditional, arranged by Clapton) – 5:25
3. "Promises" (Richard Feldman, Roger Linn) – 3:04
4. "Golden Ring" (Clapton) – 3:32
5. "Tulsa Time" (Danny Flowers) – 3:28

Note: "Early in the Morning" is extended to 7:58 on CD editions of the album.

== Singles ==
- 1978 – "Promises" (No. 37 UK Singles Chart; No. 9 US Billboard Hot 100)
- 1978 – "Watch Out for Lucy" (No. 40 US Billboard Hot 100)

== Personnel ==
- Eric Clapton – guitars, lead vocals
- Dick Sims – organ, piano
- George Terry – guitars
- Carl Radle – bass, backing vocals
- Jamie Oldaker – drums, percussion, backing vocals
- Marcy Levy – backing vocals, lead vocals on "Roll It"
- Benny Gallagher and Graham Lyle – backing vocals on "Golden Ring"

Production

- Producer and engineer – Glyn Johns
- Assistant engineer – Jon Astley
- Art direction and design – David Stewart and Nello
- Photography – Nello
- Additional photography – Rob Fraboni, Andy Seymour and Laura K. Sims.

== Charts ==
| Chart (1978–1979) | Peak position |
|---|---|
| Australian Albums (Kent Music Report) | 16 |
| Austrian Albums (Ö3 Austria) | 24 |
| Canada Top Albums/CDs (RPM) | 6 |
| Dutch Albums (Album Top 100) | 22 |
| Finnish Albums (Suomen virallinen lista) | 28 |
| Japanese Albums (Oricon) | 53 |
| New Zealand Albums (RMNZ) | 22 |
| Norwegian Albums (VG-lista) | 2 |
| Swedish Albums (Sverigetopplistan) | 28 |
| UK Albums (Official Charts) | 18 |
| US Billboard 200 | 8 |

== Certifications ==
| Region | Certification | Certified units/sales |
|---|---|---|
| Canada (Music Canada) | Platinum | 100,000^{^} |
| United Kingdom (BPI) | Silver | 60,000^{^} |
| United States (RIAA) | Platinum | 1,000,000^{^} |
^{^} Shipments figures based on certification alone.
