= Without Medication Plus MTV "Buzz Live" =

Live album by Marcella Detroit
- Released: 1996
- Recorded: 1996
- Genres: Pop, rock
- Label: Sony Music Japan
- Producer: Marcella Detroit

Marcella Detroit chronology
| Feeler (1996) | Without Medication Plus MTV "Buzz Live" (1996) | Abfab Songs (1999) |

Without Medication Plus MTV "Buzz Live" is the first live album by US singer-songwriter Marcella Detroit, released in 1996 exclusively in Japan. The album did not receive a full commercial release, distributed only on promotional CDs. According to Detroit, whilst in Japan she was asked to be the first artist to perform on a show titled MTV Buzz Live. The album consists of the studio version of "Without Medication", a track from her album Feeler, and the nine performances from the thirteen-piece live concert.

== Track listing ==
| No. | Title | Writer(s) | Length |
|---|---|---|---|
| 1. | "Without Medication" (Album Version) | Mark Saunders, Marcella Detroit |
| 2. | "Without Medication" | Saunders, Detroit |
| 3. | "Somebody's Mother" | Saunders, Detroit |
| 4. | "Detroit" | Detroit |
| 5. | "Lay Down Sally" | Eric Clapton, Detroit, George Terry |
| 6. | "Stay" | Siobhan Fahey, Detroit, Jean Guiot |
| 7. | "Kidd" | Casioman, Detroit |
| 8. | "Gasoline" | Casioman, Detroit |
| 9. | "Miss Anne Throp" | Casioman, Detroit |
| 10. | "Boy" | Saunders, Detroit |
