= I Believe (Marcella Detroit song) =

1994 single by Marcella Detroit

Single by Marcella Detroit

from the album Jewel
- B-side: "Shadow"; "I Want to Take You Higher"
- Released: February 28, 1994
- Genre: Pop; rock
- Length: 4:52 (album version); 4:46 (edit)
- Label: London
- Songwriter: Marcella Detroit
- Producer: Chris Thomas

Marcella Detroit singles chronology
| "Close to Her" (1982) | "I Believe" (1994) | "Ain't Nothing Like the Real Thing" (1994) |

Music video
- "I Believe" on YouTube

"I Believe" is a song by American singer-songwriter Marcella Detroit, released on February 28, 1994, by London Records as the lead single from her second studio album, Jewel (1994). Written by Detroit and produced by Chris Thomas, the song went on to become Detroit's most successful single, reaching number one in Israel and entering the top 20 in Australia, Sweden, and the United Kingdom.

German singer Joana Zimmer covered this song and released it as a single in 2005. Her version was more successful than Detroit's original in German-speaking countries, reaching the top 10 in Austria and Germany and number 13 in Switzerland.

== Critical reception ==
Aaron Badgley from AllMusic felt songs like "I Believe" are "powerful songs, with great melodic hooks that stick after just one listening." Larry Flick from Billboard magazine wrote, "Shakespear's Sister siren steps solo with an airy pop ballad that shows recently undisplayed vocal depth and power. Detroit can move mountains with a restrained whisper, and shatter glass with a rapturous bellow—both of which we get here. Fleshed-out, lush synths and plucky sitar riffs will remind some of Annie Lennox's Diva musings in the most positive way, while others will tap into the unique style that Detroit has developed. A multiformat smash is in the offing." In his review of Jewel, Johnny Huston from Entertainment Weekly said, "Marcella Detroit has a gift for perverse lyrics and a voice like Mariah Carey with a head cold, and she pouts and poses impressively in the role of tragic diva." Chuck Campbell from Knoxville News Sentinel felt the singer "grandstands in rather typical fashion on the love song". In his weekly UK chart commentary, James Masterton complimented it as a "gorgeous ballad".

A reviewer from Music & Media commented, "'Hello, turn your radio on' because this solo debut of the American half out of Shakespears Sister is the perfect pop single. The intro is superb for talkative jocks, and so is the outro—if they can still find the words after the most stunning chorus in a long time." Music & Media editor Robbert Tilli wrote, "With 'I Believe' Detroit delivered the "perfect pop single" with the right eyecatching artwork, showing her with a Philip Tracey-designed glove-shaped hat, as if the muse herself is putting her supportive hand on her head." Alan Jones from Music Week gave it a score of four out of five and named it Pick of the Week, stating that Detroit makes her solo debut with "a stylish, self-penned swayer. After a low-key start, it builds admirably, and has an insidious chorus. Radio is already on board, and retail success is just a matter of time. Fab." Tom Doyle from Smash Hits gave the song three out of five, saying, "This is a properly played, properly sung, moody in the verses, rock belter in the choruses type of tune and it's all pleasant enough. Even if it does somehow remind you of that goldie oldie 'China in Your Hand' by rock titans of yesteryear, T'Pau."

== Music video ==
A black-and-white music video was made to accompany the song, directed by Big T.V. It features Skin from Skunk Anansie in a small role as a runner. The video depicts Detroit standing in a field, by some abandoned buildings where various people appears. She sings while she is looking up at a light that are shining down on her. As the video progress, people come running, surrounding the singer, and also they starts looking up in the sky. As more and more people joins the crowd, it gets larger and larger. It starts raining, and everybody leaves except for Detroit, who falls to her knees. As the video ends, the light is still shining down on her, through the rain.

== Track listings ==
- US cassette single
1. "I Believe" – 4:51
2. "Shadow" – 3:43
- UK and Australian CD single
1. "I Believe" – 4:50
2. "Shadow" – 3:30
3. "I Want to Take You Higher" – 3:29
- UK 7-inch and cassette single, European CD single
1. "I Believe" – 4:50
2. "I Want to Take You Higher" – 3:29

== Charts ==
=== Weekly charts ===
| Chart (1994) | Peak position |
|---|---|
| Australia (ARIA) | 10 |
| Canada Top Singles (RPM) | 56 |
| Europe (Eurochart Hot 100) | 19 |
| Europe (European AC Radio) | 21 |
| Europe (European Hit Radio) | 6 |
| Germany (GfK) | 81 |
| Iceland (Íslenski Listinn Topp 40) | 26 |
| Ireland (IRMA) | 24 |
| Israel (Israeli Singles Chart) | 1 |
| Netherlands (Dutch Top 40 Tipparade) | 12 |
| Netherlands (Single Top 100 Tipparade) | 9 |
| Scottish Singles Sales (Official Charts) | 7 |
| Sweden (Sverigetopplistan) | 18 |
| Switzerland (Schweizer Hitparade) | 22 |
| UK Singles (Official Charts) | 11 |
| UK Airplay (Music Week) | 6 |

=== Year-end charts ===
| Chart (1994) | Position |
|---|---|
| Australia (ARIA) | 73 |
| UK Singles (OCC) | 106 |
| UK Airplay (Music Week) | 40 |

== Certifications and sales ==
| Region | Certification | Certified units/sales |
|---|---|---|
| Australia (ARIA) | Gold | 35,000^{^} |
^{^} Shipments figures based on certification alone.

== Release history ==
| Region | Date | Format(s) | Label(s) | Ref. |
|---|---|---|---|---|
| United Kingdom | February 28, 1994 | —N/a | London | |
| Australia | April 4, 1994 | CD; cassette | London; Polydor | |

== Joana Zimmer version ==
"I Believe (Give a Little Bit)"

Single by Joana Zimmer

from the album My Innermost
- B-side: "Another Day"
- Released: April 11, 2005
- Length: 4:11
- Label: Polydor
- Songwriter: Marcella Detroit
- Producers: Nick Nice; Pontus Söderqvist

Joana Zimmer singles chronology
| "I Believe (Give a Little Bit)" (2005) | "I've Learned to Walk Alone" (2005) |

In 2005, German singer Joana Zimmer covered the song and released it as "I Believe (Give a Little Bit)" on Polydor Records as her debut single. In several territories, her single was more successful than the original, but in Sweden, it reached number 33 compared to Detroit's peak of number 18.

=== Track listing ===
- German CD single
1. "I Believe" (radio edit) – 4:11
2. "I Believe" (radio mix) – 3:51
3. "Any Other Day" – 3:29
4. "I Believe" – 4:33
5. "I Believe" (instrumental) – 4:34

=== Charts ===
==== Weekly charts ====
| Chart (2005) | Peak position |
|---|---|
| Austria (Ö3 Austria Top 40) | 6 |
| Europe (Eurochart Hot 100) | 12 |
| Germany (GfK) | 2 |
| Sweden (Sverigetopplistan) | 33 |
| Switzerland (Schweizer Hitparade) | 13 |

==== Year-end charts ====
| Chart (2005) | Position |
|---|---|
| Austria (Ö3 Austria Top 40) | 43 |
| Europe (Eurochart Hot 100) | 92 |
| Germany (Media Control GfK) | 20 |
| Switzerland (Schweizer Hitparade) | 50 |

=== Certifications and sales ===
| Region | Certification | Certified units/sales |
|---|---|---|
| Germany (BVMI) | Gold | 150,000^{^} |
^{^} Shipments figures based on certification alone.
