= Demoz (album) =

Demo album by Marcella Detroit
- Released: 1 May 1999
- Genre: Pop, rock
- Label: Independent
- Producer: Marcella Detroit

Marcella Detroit chronology
Abfab Songs (1999)	Demoz (1999)	Limited Edition (2001)

Demoz is a demo album by US singer-songwriter Marcella Detroit, released in 1999 through her website. All songs were written and produced by Detroit herself.

== Track listing ==
Disc one
No.	Title	Length
1.	"Something"	4:05
2.	"Sign"	3:26
3.	"Country"	4:30
4.	"5's n 10's"	3:55
5.	"Wheezil"	4:10
6.	"Did You Die Too"	3:51
7.	"You"	3:58
8.	"Alright"	3:42
9.	"Take It With You"	4:08
10.	"Wide On"	4:30
11.	"Modern Love"
12.	"Test"	3:56
13.	"Hurt You"	4:00
14.	"Oops"
15.	"Armageddon"	4:36
16.	"Misfit"	4:15
17.	"Desperate"	4:10
18.	"Peace"	3:00
19.	"Kim"	3:25

Disc two
No.	Title	Length
1.	"Dancing Madly Sideways"
2.	"Need You Now"
3.	"Speed"
4.	"Closer"
5.	"Hard 4 Me"
6.	"Missing"
7.	"Black"
8.	"Blue"
9.	"Tenderness"
10.	"The Present"
11.	"Asylum"
12.	"Party"
13.	"Girlfriend"
14.	"Favours"
15.	"Peace"
16.	"Down to the Wire"
17.	"Change the World"
18.	"Oops"
