= For the Holidays =

Studio album by Marcella Detroit
- Released: 22 November 2013
- Genres: Pop, Christmas
- Label: Make Zee

Marcella Detroit chronology
The Vehicle (2013)	For the Holidays (2013)	Gray Matterz (2015)

For the Holidays is the sixth studio album, and first holiday album, by American musician Marcella Detroit, released in April 2013 under Make Zee Records.

== Background ==
For the Holidays is the first holiday studio album by Detroit, and her third overall holiday release. Compared to the long-anticipated release of The Vehicle, the album came with little prior announcement. Detroit uploaded a simplistic music video for "California Christmas" (under the title "California Xmas") on 6 November 2013, announcing an upcoming full holiday album, Hollydaze. On 11 November, she uploaded the full album to TuneCore, with the news the album would be titled For the Holidays and would be available in the next ten days. The album was released exclusively on digital format on 22 November 2013.

Musically, the album is composed of songs which, according to Detroit, were written all in the prior ten years. As well as several new compositions, the album also includes all six tracks from the Happy Holiday and Holiday 2012 EPs.

== Track listing ==
No.	Title	Length
1.	"Ave Maria"	2:22
2.	"California Christmas"	2:56
3.	"Happy Holiday!"	3:20
4.	"Parumpapumpum"	4:13
5.	"You Better Be Good"	4:22
6.	"Rock of Ages"	4:37
7.	"O Holy Night"	4:07
8.	"Silent Night"	2:56
9.	"Peace"	3:03
10.	"O Chanukah"	2:38
11.	"It's Still Christmas"	3:49
