= Joana Zimmer =

German singer

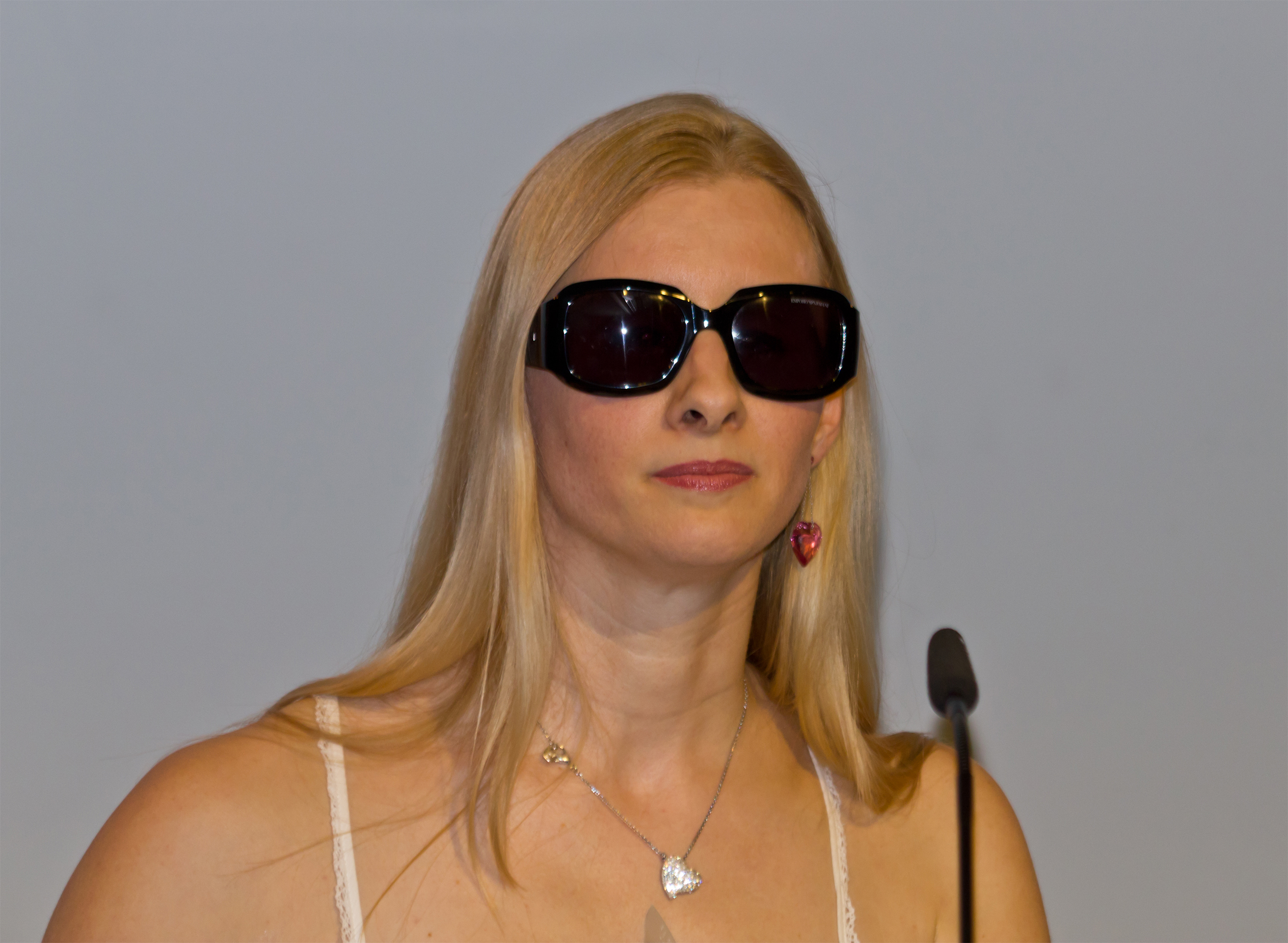
- Zimmer in 2013.
- Born: 27 October 1982 (age 43); Freiburg im Breisgau, West Germany
- Occupations: Singer; songwriter; television personality
- Years active: 2005–present

Joana Zimmer (born October 27, 1982; 43 years ago; Freiburg im Breisgau, West Germany) is a German pop music singer. Zimmer is blind.

== Discography ==
=== Albums ===
Year	Title	Chart positions		
Year	Title	GER	AUT	CH
2005	My Innermost: 1st studio album; Formats: CD, digital download	5	13	25
2006	The Voice in Me: 2nd studio album; Formats: CD, digital download	22	25	51
2008	Showtime: 3rd studio album; Formats: CD, digital download	—	—	—
2010	Miss JZ: 4th studio album; Formats: CD, digital download	—	—	—
2012	Not Looking Back: 5th studio album; Formats: CD, digital download	—	—	—

=== Singles ===
Year	Title	Chart positions				
Year	Title	GER	AUT	SUI	SWE	PL
2005	"I Believe (Give a Little Bit)"	2	6	13	33	28
2005	"I've Learned To Walk Alone"	38	72	-	-	-
2005	"Let's Make History (ft. David Bisbal)"	54	-	45	-	-
2006	"Bringing Down The Moon"	46	-	44	-	-
2006	"This is my Life"	46	-	44	-	-
2007	"If It's Too Late"	-	-	-	-	-
2010	"Till You're Gone"	-	-	-	-	-
