= Stars (Australian band) =

Australian 1970s country rock band

- Origin: Adelaide, South Australia, Australia
- Genres: Country, rock
- Years active: 1975–1979; 2019–present
- Labels: Mushroom, Festival
- Past members: See members list below

Stars were an Australian country rock band formed in Adelaide, South Australia in 1975 and disbanding in 1979, before re-forming in 2019. Founding members were Glyn Dowding on drums; Malcolm Eastick on guitar and vocals; Mick Pealing on vocals; and Graham Thompson on bass guitar. They were joined by guitarist, songwriter, Andrew Durant in 1976 and relocated to Melbourne. Thompson then left and was replaced by a succession of bass guitarists including Roger McLachlan (ex-Little River Band) and Ian McDonald.

The band's debut album, Paradise, peaked at No. 14 on the Australian Kent Music Report in 1978 and included their highest-charting single "Look After Yourself" which reached No. 30 on the related singles chart. Their second album, Land of Fortune, was released in June 1979 and peaked at No. 35. By that time Durant had been diagnosed with cancer, the band had their last performance on 5 November and Durant died on 6 May 1980 at age 25. A tribute performance by Stars members and other Australian acts followed in August and a double-LP, Andrew Durant Memorial Concert was released in 1981. It peaked at No. 8 on the albums chart with proceeds donated to Andrew Durant Cancer Research Foundation.

Stars re-formed in 2019, announcing a tour in November and December of that year.

== History ==
Adelaide band Astra Kahn formed in 1972, including Glyn Dowding on drums, Andrew Durant on guitar, and Malcolm Eastick on guitar and vocals. They disbanded by 1973 with Dowding and Eastick forming Flash in 1974 with Mick Pealing on vocals. In May 1975, Dowding, Eastick and Pealing formed Stars with Graham Thompson on bass. As a country rock band they were touted as Australian rock'n'roll cowboys and played the local pub and club circuit. They were noticed by pop group, Little River Band's guitarist Beeb Birtles, signed to Mushroom Records and relocated to Melbourne. Birtles produced their debut single, "Quick on the Draw" which reached the Australian Kent Music Report top 50 in July 1976. Durant joined in August on guitar and became their principal songwriter.

Their second single, "With a Winning Hand" peaked at number 65 in October. Founding bass guitarist Thompson left and was replaced first by Michael Hegerty and then by Roger McLachlan (ex-Little River Band). The band supported Joe Cocker on his Australian tour in mid-1977. They released their third single, "Mighty Rock" which reached the top 50 in August. By November, Ian MacDonald replaced McLachlan and they released, "Look After Yourself" which became their highest-charting single at No. 30. It was issued ahead of their debut album, Paradise (December 1977) which peaked at No. 14 on the Kent Music Report albums chart. The album spawned two more singles, "Back Again" in March and "West Is the Way" in June. In September, founding drummer Dowding was replaced by John James Hackett (ex-Phil Manning Band).

Stars continued touring including supporting The Beach Boys and Linda Ronstadt on their Australian tours in 1978–1979. A second album, Land of Fortune was released in June 1979, it was produced by Ern Rose and Eastick. By that time Durant had been diagnosed with cancer and Stars performed a last concert on 5 November. A live album, 1157—titled for the number of career gigs—appeared in July 1980, which was produced by Eastick. Durant had died on 6 May at age 25.

A tribute performance by Stars members and other Australian acts followed in August and a double-LP, Andrew Durant Memorial Concert was released in 1981. It peaked at No. 8 on the albums chart with proceeds eventually donated to Andrew Durant Cancer Research Foundation.

== Later careers ==
Dowding returned on drums for the Durant tribute concert. Eastick joined Broderick Smith's Big Combo (1979–1982) and later provided guitar for different artists including Max Merritt and Jimmy Barnes. Pealing formed his own band Mick Pealing and the Ideals (1980–1981), and were also a backing band for Renée Geyer. He then formed The Spaniards (1983–1986) and worked with other artists including Eastick. McLachlan toured with Cliff Richard in 1978, worked with John Farnham (1987–1988), briefly rejoined Little River Band (1998–1999) and was a member of Mighty Rock with Pealing in 2004. McLachlan died at the age of 71 on 16 April 2025.

== Members ==
- Glyn Dowding – drums (1975–1978)
- Malcolm Eastick – guitar, vocals (1975–1979, 2019–2023)
- Mick Pealing – vocals (1975–1979, 2019- )
- Graham Thompson – bass guitar (1975–1976)
- Andrew Durant – guitar (1976–1979; died 1980)
- Michael Hegerty – bass guitar (1976)
- Roger McLachlan – bass guitar (1976–1977, 2019-2025, died 2025 )
- Ian McDonald – bass guitar (1977–1979)
- John James Hackett – drums (1978–1979)
- Nick Charles – guitar (2019- )
- Erik Chess – drums (2019- )
- Geoff Achison – guitar (2023- )
- Ed Bates – pedal steel (2023- )

== Discography ==
=== Albums ===
Title	Album details	Peak chart positions
Title	Album details	AUS
Paradise	Released: December 1977; Mushroom Records (L 36470)	14
Land of Fortune	Released: June 1979; Mushroom Records (L 36935)	35
1157	Released: July 1980; Mushroom Records (L 37389); Live album	46
Boundary Rider	Released: 2018	

=== Singles ===
Year	Title	Peak chart positions	Album
Year	Title	AUS	Album
1976	"Quick on the Draw / Straight Life"	46	Non-album single
1976	"With a Winning Hand / Drift Away"	65	Non-album single
1977	"Mighty Rock / Jupiter Creek"	47	Paradise
1977	"Look After Yourself / Red Neck Boogie"	30	Paradise
1978	"Back Again / Let's Get Moving"	52	Paradise
1978	"West Is the Way / No Time for Crying"	—	Paradise
1979	"In and Out of Love / Song for the Road"	62	Land of Fortune
1979	"Land of Fortune / Innocent Bystanders"	93	Land of Fortune
1979	"Wasted Words / Never Coming Back"	—	Land of Fortune
1979	"Last of the Riverboats / Gold Fever"	—	Land of Fortune
"—" denotes a recording that did not chart or was not released in that territory.

=== Other appearances ===
Year	Title	Album
1977	"With a Winning Hand" (live)	Nightmovin' Live!: Recorded Highlights of the Nightmoves Concert
1977	"Redneck Boogie" (live)	Nightmovin' Live!: Recorded Highlights of the Nightmoves Concert
1977	"I'll Be Creepin'" (live)	Nightmovin' Live!: Recorded Highlights of the Nightmoves Concert
1977	"With a Winning Hand" (edit)	The FJ Holden: Original Soundtrack
1998	"Mighty Rock" (live)	Mushroom 25 Live

== Awards ==
Stars were inducted into the South Australian Music Awards Hall of fame in 2016.
