= Happy Holiday (EP) =

EP by Marcella Detroit
- Released: 23 November 2011
- Genres: Pop, Christmas
- Label: Independent

Marcella Detroit chronology
Dancing Madly Sideways (2001)	Happy Holiday (2011)	Holiday 2012 (2012)

Happy Holiday is a Christmas EP by American singer-songwriter Marcella Detroit, released independently through digital retailers in November 2011.

== Background ==
Happy Holiday is Detroit's first solo release since her Dancing Madly Sideways album in 2001. The EP consists of two original songs - including "You Better Be Good", first released as a single in 2009 - and two covers. On 3 December 2011, Detroit premiered a low-budget music video for the EP's title track on her official YouTube channel, featuring her and a band (also played by Detroit) performing in front of an animated snowy green screen backdrop. A two-track extension to the EP, Holiday 2012, was released a year later in November 2012. Both Happy Holiday and Holiday 2012 were included in their entirety on Detroit's 2013 Holiday album, For the Holidays.

== Track listing ==
No.	Title	Length
1.	"Happy Holiday"	3:21
2.	"You Better Be Good"	4:26
3.	"Rock of Ages"	4:40
4.	"O Holy Night"	4:08
