= Abfab Songs =

EP by Marcella Detroit
- Released: 1999
- Recorded: 1994–1996
- Genre: Pop, rock
- Label: Independent
- Producer: Marcella Detroit

Marcella Detroit chronology
Without Medication Plus MTV "Buzz Live" (1996)	Abfab Songs (1999)	Demoz (1999)

Abfab Songs is an EP by American singer-songwriter Marcella Detroit, released in 1999 through her website. The six-song EP consists entirely of original songs featured on Absolutely Fabulous in 1996, when Detroit guest-starred in two episodes as an angel.

== Critical reception ==
Professional ratings
Review scores
Source	Rating
Allmusic	4/5 stars

Aaron Badgley from Allmusic gave the EP a positive review, calling it an "interesting release", and complementing the musical variety, but criticizing the packaging and short length.

== Track listing ==
No.	Title	Length
1.	"Today's My Day"	2:39
2.	"Glad to Be Me"	2:38
3.	"Valdesaire"	1:46
4.	"Something"	4:03
5.	"Sign"	3:27
6.	"Today's My Day" (reprise)	2:39
