= Ain't Nothing Like the Real Thing =

1968 single by Marvin Gaye and Tammi Terrell

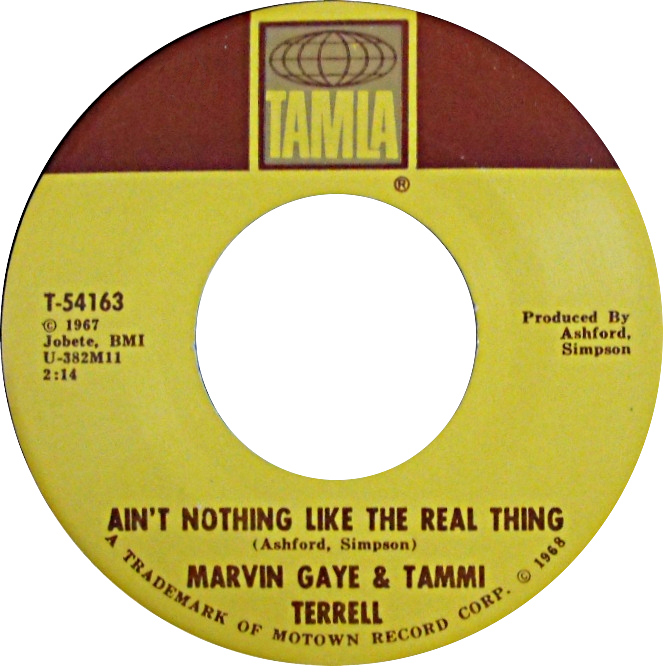
- A-side label of the U.S. vinyl single

Single by Marvin Gaye and Tammi Terrell

from the album You're All I Need
- B-side: "Little Ole Boy, Little Ole Girl"
- Released: March 28, 1968
- Recorded: 1967
- Studio: Hitsville USA
- Genre: Soul; pop
- Length: 2:12
- Label: Tamla
- Songwriter: Ashford & Simpson
- Producers: Ashford & Simpson

Marvin Gaye and Tammi Terrell singles chronology
"If I Could Build My Whole World Around You/If This World Were Mine" (1967)	"Ain't Nothing Like the Real Thing" (1968)	"You're All I Need to Get By" (1968)

Marvin Gaye singles chronology
"You" (1967)	"Ain't Nothing Like the Real Thing" (1968)	"You're All I Need to Get By" (1968)

Tammi Terrell singles chronology
"If I Could Build My Whole World Around You/If This World Were Mine" (1967)	"Ain't Nothing Like the Real Thing" (1968)	"You're All I Need to Get By" (1968)

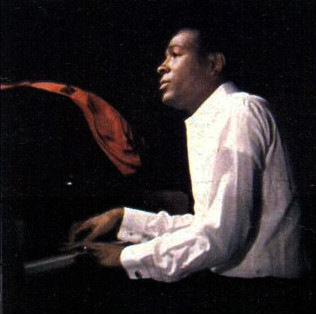
Gaye in 1968

"Ain't Nothing Like the Real Thing" is a single released by American R&B/soul duo Marvin Gaye and Tammi Terrell, on the Tamla label in 1968. The B-side of the single is "Little Ole Boy, Little Ole Girl" from the duo's United LP. The first release off the duo's second album: You're All I Need, the song—written and produced by regular Gaye/Terrell collaborators Ashford & Simpson—became a hit within weeks of release eventually peaking at number eight on the US Billboard Hot 100 and number one on the Hot Soul Singles chart, the first of the duo's two number-one R&B hits. In the UK "Ain't Nothing Like the Real Thing" reached number 34.

Cash Box called it "a potent ballad", saying that "Detroit backing puts a beat into the session" and praising the "splendid vocals". "Ain't Nothing Like the Real Thing" was ranked as the 57th-biggest US hit of 1968.

== Charts ==
=== Weekly charts ===
Chart (1968)	Peak position
Canada Top Singles (RPM)	9
UK Singles (Official Charts)	34
US Billboard Hot 100	8
US Hot Rhythm & Blues Singles (Billboard)	1
US Cash Box Top 100	9

=== Year-end charts ===
Chart (1968)	Rank
US Billboard Hot 100	57
US Cash Box Top 100	70

== Personnel ==
- All lead vocals by Marvin Gaye and Tammi Terrell
- Background vocals by Nickolas Ashford and Valerie Simpson
- Produced by Ashford & Simpson
- Instrumentation by The Funk Brothers

== Donny and Marie version ==
"Ain't Nothing Like the Real Thing"
- Side A of the US single

Single by Donny & Marie Osmond

from the album New Season
- B-side: "Sing"
- Released: November 1976
- Genre: Bubblegum pop
- Label: Polydor/Kolob
- Songwriter: Ashford & Simpson
- Producers: Mike Curb and Michael Lloyd

Donny & Marie Osmond singles chronology
"Deep Purple" (1975)	"Ain't Nothing Like the Real Thing" (1976)	"(You're My) Soul and Inspiration" (1977)

American singers Donny Osmond and Marie Osmond, billed as Donny & Marie, remade "Ain't Nothing Like the Real Thing" for their November 1976 album release New Season, with the track having a concurrent single release to reach number 21 on the US Billboard Hot 100 in February 1977, also charting Adult Contemporary at number 17. It was also a chart hit in Canada, peaking at number 26 on the pop chart and number 11 on the AC chart.

Record World said that it "is their finest performance yet".

=== Charts ===
Chart (1976–77)	Peak position
Canada Top Singles (RPM)	26
Canada Adult Contemporary (RPM)	11
US Billboard Hot 100	21
US Adult Contemporary (Billboard)	17
US Cash Box Top 100	30

== Elton John and Marcella Detroit version ==
"Ain't Nothin' Like the Real Thing"

Single by Elton John and Marcella Detroit

from the album Duets and Jewel
- Released: May 2, 1994
- Length: 3:36
- Songwriters: Nikolas Ashford; Valerie Simpson
- Producer: Chris Thomas

Elton John singles chronology
"Don't Go Breaking My Heart" (1994)	"Ain't Nothin' Like the Real Thing" (1994)	"Can You Feel the Love Tonight" (1994)

Music video
- "Ain't Nothin' Like the Real Thing" on YouTube

Marcella Detroit singles chronology
"I Believe" (1994)	"Ain't Nothing Like the Real Thing" (1994)	"I'm No Angel" (1994)

The British musician Elton John and the American singer Marcella Detroit recorded "Ain't Nothin' Like the Real Thing" for John's 1993 album Duets. After its inclusion on Detroit's album, Jewel, the song was released as a single under London Records in May 1994 as the fourth and final song from Duets, as well as the second single from Jewel. The B-sides, "Break the Chain" and "I Feel Free", are performed solo by Detroit. Detroit and John's version was produced by Chris Thomas and peaked at number 24 on the UK singles chart as well as number 29 in Iceland.

Alan Jones from Music Week gave this version three out of five, writing, "Comparing with the original Marvin Gaye/Tammi Terrell pairing, this is a rather wan remake, but it will still make a dent in the Top 40." Leesa Daniels from Smash Hits complimented Detroit as "a stylish chick who has a lovely voice that could crack glass".

=== Charts ===
Chart (1994)	Peak position
Europe (European Hit Radio)	31
Iceland (Íslenski Listinn Topp 40)	29
Scotland Singles (Official Charts)	42
UK Singles (OCC)	24
UK Airplay (Music Week)	6

== Other notable versions ==
Aretha Franklin remade the song for her 1974 album Let Me in Your Life. It was issued as the album's third hit single that August. Franklin's version radically re-invents the upbeat Marvin Gaye/Tammi Terrell original as a deep soul ballad which Jon Landau of Rolling Stone dismissed as "misconceived (done too slowly)". Billboard described it as being highlighted by "extremely powerful vocals". "Ain't Nothing Like the Real Thing" reached number six on the Billboard Soul chart, as well as number 44 in Cash Box and number 47 on the Billboard Hot 100. It won Franklin the Best Female R&B Vocal Performance Grammy for 1974 marking Franklin's eighth total and consecutive win in that category and her last such win until the Grammys for 1981.

Chris Christian remade the song in medley with another Marvin Gaye/Tammi Terrell hit "You're All I Need to Get By" for his Bob Gaudio-produced 1981 album: a duet with Amy Holland, the track "Ain't Nothing Like the Real Thing/ You're All I Need to Get By" had a single release in the summer of 1982 to reach number 88 on Billboard Hot 100 also charting Adult Contemporary at number 21. (Amy Holland's husband Michael McDonald would remake "Ain't Nothing Like the Real Thing" for his 2003 album Motown.) Christian's 1986 live album release Live At Six Flags features "Ain't Nothing Like the Real Thing" in medley with "Don't Worry Baby" and "I Go to Pieces".

Music critic David McGee of Rolling Stone named Vince Gill and Gladys Knight's recording of the song one of a couple "outright failures" of the 1994 ensemble album Rhythm, Country and Blues, criticizing Gill for "sound[ing] like a wimp [and] his soft, airy readings blown away by Knight's fierce delivery."

British DJ Alex Adair was inspired by the song "Ain't Nothing Like the Real Thing" by Marvin Gaye and Tammi Terrell (1968). In 2015, he released the track "Make Me Feel Better," which featured samples of this hit. Later, Don Diablo & CID released an official remix on the HEXAGON label.

The Morning Call praised Michael McDonald and Chaka Khan's duet performance of "Ain't Nothing like the Real Thing" at McDonald's June 25, 2019, live concert at Sands Bethlehem Event Center as "better" than their performance of "Ain't No Mountain High Enough" (also originally sung by Gaye and Terell), which Moser criticized as "an underwhelming mess of missed lyrics and timing".
