= Perfect World (Marcella Detroit song) =

Single by Marcella Detroit

from the album Jewel
- Released: 6 March 1995
- Recorded: 1993
- Genre: Pop, R&B
- Length: 4:14
- Label: London
- Songwriter(s): Marcella Detroit

Marcella Detroit singles chronology
"I'm No Angel" (1994)	"Perfect World" (1995)	"I Hate You Now..." (1996)

Alternative cover
- CD single 2

"Perfect World" is a song by US singer Marcella Detroit, released in March 1995 under London Records as the fourth and final single from her album Jewel. The song reached a meager #100 on the UK Singles Chart, and was Detroit's final release with the label.

== Track listing ==
- CD Single 1
1. "Perfect World" (95 Radio Mix) — 3:59
2. "Perfect World" (Album Version) — 4:32
3. "Perfect World" (Youth's Vocal Session) — 5:59
4. "Perfect World" (Youth's Dub Session) — 5:59
- CD Single 2 - Acoustic Sessions
1. "Perfect World" (Acoustic)
2. "I Believe" (Acoustic)
3. "I'm No Angel" (Acoustic)
4. "You Don't Tell Me Everything" (Acoustic)

== Charts ==
Chart (1994)	Peak position
UK Singles (Official Charts Company)	100
