= I'm No Angel (Marcella Detroit song) =

1994 single by Marcella Detroit

Single by Marcella Detroit

from the album Jewel
- Released: July 4, 1994
- Length: 4:14
- Label: London
- Songwriter(s): Marcella Detroit
- Producer(s): Chris Thomas

Marcella Detroit singles chronology
"Ain't Nothing Like the Real Thing" (1994)	"I'm No Angel" (1994)	"Perfect World" (1995)

Music video
- "I'm No Angel" on YouTube

Alternative cover
- CD single 2

"I'm No Angel" is a song by American singer-songwriter Marcella Detroit, released in July 1994, through London Records as the third UK single and second Australian single from her second album, Jewel (1994). It was written by Detroit and produced by Chris Thomas. The two-part CD single release contains five B-sides, with only one track, "Cool People", appearing on Jewel.

== Critical reception ==
Upon the release of the single, Alan Jones from Music Week gave it a score of three out of five, writing, "Detroit's cheerful assertion that she is only human comes clothed in a loose, fairly low-key backing track. It's fairly lightweight fare compared with much else on her Jewel album, but good enough to surpass the recent 'Ain't Nothin' Like the Real Thing' duet with Elton John." Emma Cochrane from Smash Hits gave "I'm No Angel" four out of five and named it "a decent record", saying, "She uses her distinctive voice to full effect on this, soaring all over the place yet always ending up in the right place. Totally brilliant except for the dodgy choral bit at the end."

== Track listings ==
- CD single 1
1. "I'm No Angel" — 4:14
2. "You Own the Moon" — 4:13
3. "Cool People" — 3:32
- CD single 2
1. "I'm No Angel" — 4:14
2. "Lay Down Sally" — 4:10
3. "Crucify Me" — 3:51
4. "Monday Morning" — 4:12

== Charts ==
Chart (1994)	Peak position
Australia (ARIA)	116
Scotland (OCC)	23
UK Singles (OCC)	33
UK Airplay (Music Week)	29
