= I Hate You Now... =

Single by Marcella Detroit

from the album Feeler
- Released: June 1996
- Genre: Pop, Rock
- Length: 3:44
- Label: AAA, Mega
- Songwriter(s): Marcella Detroit
- Producer(s): Mark Saunders, Marcella Detroit

Marcella Detroit singles chronology
"Perfect World" (1995)	"I Hate You Now..." (1996)	"Somebody's Mother" (1996)

"I Hate You Now..." is a song by US singer Marcella Detroit, released in June 1996 as the first single from her third album Feeler. The single is also her first release with both AAA Records and Mega Records. The single failed to reach the same success as many of Detroit's previous releases, peaking at #107 on the uncompressed UK Singles Chart, and #96 on the compressed UK singles chart (with deleted titles for singles with declining sales beyond #75). In Australia, the single peaked at #166.

== Critical reception ==
British magazine Music Week rated the song three out of five, adding, "This Eighties-sounding pop offering is a grower — if you can stomach Detroit's glass-shattering choruses. Quirky."

== Track listing ==
- CD Single
1. "I Hate You Now..." — 3:37
2. "Boy" — 3:28

== Charts ==
Chart (1994)	Peak position
Australia (ARIA)	166
UK Singles (OCC)	107
