= Marcella (album) =

Studio album by Marcy Levy
- Released: 1982
- Genre: Pop
- Label: Epic
- Producers: Frank Rand, John Boylan; co-produced by Richard Feldman

Marcy Levy chronology
Marcella (1982)	Jewel (1994)

Singles from Marcella
- 1. "Close to Her" Released: 1982

Professional ratings
Review scores
Source	Rating
Allmusic	3/5 stars

Marcella is the debut studio album by British-based American musician Marcy Levy, who in her later career would perform under the name Marcella Detroit.

== Background ==
Detroit aka Levy began working on her debut solo album with producer David Foster in the mid-1970s signed to RSO Records, whilst she was touring with Eric Clapton. The album was primarily an R&B-oriented record, which Detroit felt was an attempt to "pigeonhole" her by RSO Records. For unknown reasons, the album was not finished. Detroit later stopped touring with Clapton to focus more on her own solo career. Whilst working on singing and songwriting for numerous artists including Burt Bacharach, Carole Bayer Sager, Chaka Khan, Belinda Carlisle, and Al Jarreau, she was also working on her own solo album, and Marcella was finally released in 1982 and failed to appear on any major charts. After the commercial failure of the album, Epic Records refused her tour allowance with John Mellencamp, and she was later dropped by the label.

The song "Love Side" was covered by Rita Coolidge on her 1984 album Inside the Fire with the title "Hit Me on the Loveside".

== Track listing ==
All tracks composed by Marcella Levy and Richard Feldman; except where noted.

Side one
No.	Title	Writer(s)	Length
1.	"Close to Her"		4:09
2.	"First Invasion"	Marcella Levy, Richard Feldman, David Batteau, Walt Richmond	4:14
3.	"All My Love"		4:22
4.	"Waiting on You"		3:18
5.	"Life Is on the Line"		4:31

Side two
No.	Title	Writer(s)	Length
1.	"I Can't Stand It"	Marcella Levy, Richard Feldman, Scott Shelly	3:28
2.	"Get to Know You"	Marcella Levy, Richard Feldman, Geo Connor	3:56
3.	"I Can't Wait That Long"	Marcella Levy, Richard Feldman, J.C. Crowley	3:46
4.	"To You"		3:47
5.	"Love Side"	Marcella Levy, J.C. Crowley	5:12
