= Feeler (Marcella Detroit album) =

Studio album by Marcella Detroit
- Released: 21 September 1996
- Genre: Rock, Pop
- Label: Mega, Silvertone, Sony, AAA
- Producer: Mark Saunders, Casioman, Marcella Detroit

Marcella Detroit chronology
Jewel (1994)	Feeler (1996)	Without Medication Plus MTV "Buzz Live" (1996)

Alternative cover
- Japanese edition cover

Singles from Feeler
- 1. "I Hate You Now..." Released: 24 June 1996; 2. "Somebody's Mother" Released: 1996; 3. "Boy" Released: 2 December 1996; 4. "Flower" Released: May 1997

Feeler is the third studio album by British-based American musician Marcella Detroit. It was first released in the UK by AAA Records in September 1996, with the lead single "I Hate You Now..." coincidentally released in the same month as "I Can Drive", the lead single from Detroit's former band Shakespears Sister's third album #3.

== Critical reception ==
Professional ratings
Review scores
Source	Rating
Allmusic	4.5/5 stars
The Independent	negative

Aaron Badgley from Allmusic lauded the album, calling it "honest", and "infinitely better than her debut" (incorrectly referring to Jewel). In contrast, Andy Gill from The Independent gave the album a negative review, saying "Detroit's problem is one of over-abundant choice – she's a good guitarist, a good pianist, a good vocalist, a good harmonica player, and probably pretty nifty on bass and drums, too, but she needs more discipline as to their application."

== Track listing ==
Standard edition
No.	Title	Writer(s)	Producer(s)	Length
1.	"I Hate You Now..."	Marcella Detroit	Mark Saunders, Marcella Detroit	3:44
2.	"Flower"	Detroit	Saunders, Detroit	3:00
3.	"Boy"	Detroit, Michael Moran	Saunders, Detroit	3:30
4.	"Elaine's Addiction"	Detroit	Saunders, Detroit	3:33
5.	"Without Medication"	Detroit, Moran	Saunders, Detroit	4:14
6.	"Somebody's Mother"	Detroit	Saungers, Detroit	4:08
7.	"Kidd"	Detroit	Casioman, Detroit	3:11
8.	"Gasoline"	Detroit	Casioman, Detroit	3:37
9.	"Scared Silent"	Detroit	Saunders, Detroit	3:44
10.	"The Same Father"	Detroit, Michael Graves	Casioman, Detroit	3:45
11.	"Waiting 4"	Detroit	Saunders, Detroit	3:14
12.	"Sunday"	Detroit	Saunders, Detroit	3:54

Japanese edition
No.	Title	Writer(s)	Producer(s)	Length
1.	"Boy"	Marcella Detroit, Michael Moran	Mark Saunders, Marcella Detroit	3:30
2.	"Flower"	Detroit	Saunders, Detroit	3:00
3.	"I Hate You Now..."	Detroit	Saunders, Detroit	3:44
4.	"Miss Anne Throp"	Detroit	Casioman, Detroit	3:15
5.	"Elaine's Addiction"	Detroit	Saunders, Detroit	3:33
6.	"Without Medication"	Detroit, Moran	Saunders, Detroit	4:14
7.	"Somebody's Mother"	Detroit	Saungers, Detroit	4:08
8.	"Kidd"	Detroit	Casioman, Detroit	3:11
9.	"Gasoline"	Detroit	Casioman, Detroit	3:37
10.	"Scared Silent"	Detroit	Saunders, Detroit	3:44
11.	"The Same Father"	Detroit	Saunders, Detroit	3:45
12.	"Waiting"	Detroit	Saunders, Detroit	3:14
13.	"Sunday"	Detroit	Saunders, Detroit	3:54

== Singles ==
"I Hate You Now..." was released as Feeler's lead single in June 1996, and peaked at #96 on the UK Singles Chart. This was followed by "Somebody's Mother", which failed to chart, and "Boy" which reached #83. The fourth and final single, "Flower", was released in mid-1997 and failed to chart.

== Charts ==
Chart (1996)	Peak position
Japanese Albums Chart	82
