= Dancing Madly Sideways =

Studio album by Marcella Detroit
- Released: 13 July 2001
- Genre: Rock, Pop
- Label: Banned
- Producer: Paula Jones

Marcella Detroit chronology
Limited Edition (2001)	Dancing Madly Sideways (2001)	Happy Holiday (2011)

Singles from Dancing Madly Sideways
- 1. "Lust for Like" Released: 2001

Dancing Madly Sideways is the fourth studio album by the British-based American musician Marcella Detroit, released in July 2001.

== Background ==
Detroit explains the title and concept of Dancing Madly Sideways as being "How I see the world; going crazy. Not progressing, not going back, just going sideways". The non-traditional electronic sound of the record stemmed from Detroit "wanting to do something more experimental". The album was released for free download through numerous MP3 websites and as a mail-order exclusive physical release from Detroit's website. It is the first Detroit album released by her independent label Banned Records, which was later renamed Lofi Records. Preceding the album's release, two releases were made available for purchase: a CD single of "Lust for Like" and a three-track sampler EP, Limited Edition.

== Critical reception ==
Professional ratings
Review scores
Source	Rating
Allmusic	4/5 stars

Aaron Badgley from Allmusic gave the album a positive review, writing, "Here [Detroit] is able to assemble a tight band and produce a brilliant, angry, aggressive, exciting dance/rock album. Detroit's vocals are strong, as is her outstanding guitar playing. Fast, tasteful, and tuneful solos complete the mix and contribute to the originality of the music."

== Track listing ==
No.	Title	Length
1.	"Dancing Madly Sideways"	4:36
2.	"Lust for Like"	4:42
3.	"I Am"	4:13
4.	"Black"	5:00
5.	"Sign"	3:29
6.	"The Suckers and the Sage"	4:33
7.	"I Love Myself"	3:44
8.	"If"	3:54
9.	"Closer"	4:26
10.	"Built for Speed"	4:01
