= Boy (Marcella Detroit song) =

Single by Marcella Detroit

from the album Feeler
- Released: 2 December 1996
- Genre: Pop, Rock
- Length: 3:44
- Label: AAA, Mega, Sony
- Songwriter(s): Marcella Detroit, Michael Moran
- Producer(s): Mark Saunders, Marcella Detroit

Marcella Detroit singles chronology
"Somebody's Mother" (1996)	"Boy" (1996)	"Flower" (1997)

"Boy" is a song by US singer Marcella Detroit, released in December 1996 as the third single from her album Feeler. Although the most successful of all four singles released from Feeler, the song performed poorly nonetheless, peaking at #83 on the UK Singles Chart.

== Track listing ==
- CD Single
1. "Boy" — 3:15
2. "Without Medication" — 4:14
3. "Sunday" — 3:54

== Charts ==
Chart (1994)	Peak position
UK Singles (Official Charts Company)	83
