= Marcella Detroit =

American singer, songwriter, and guitarist (born 1952)

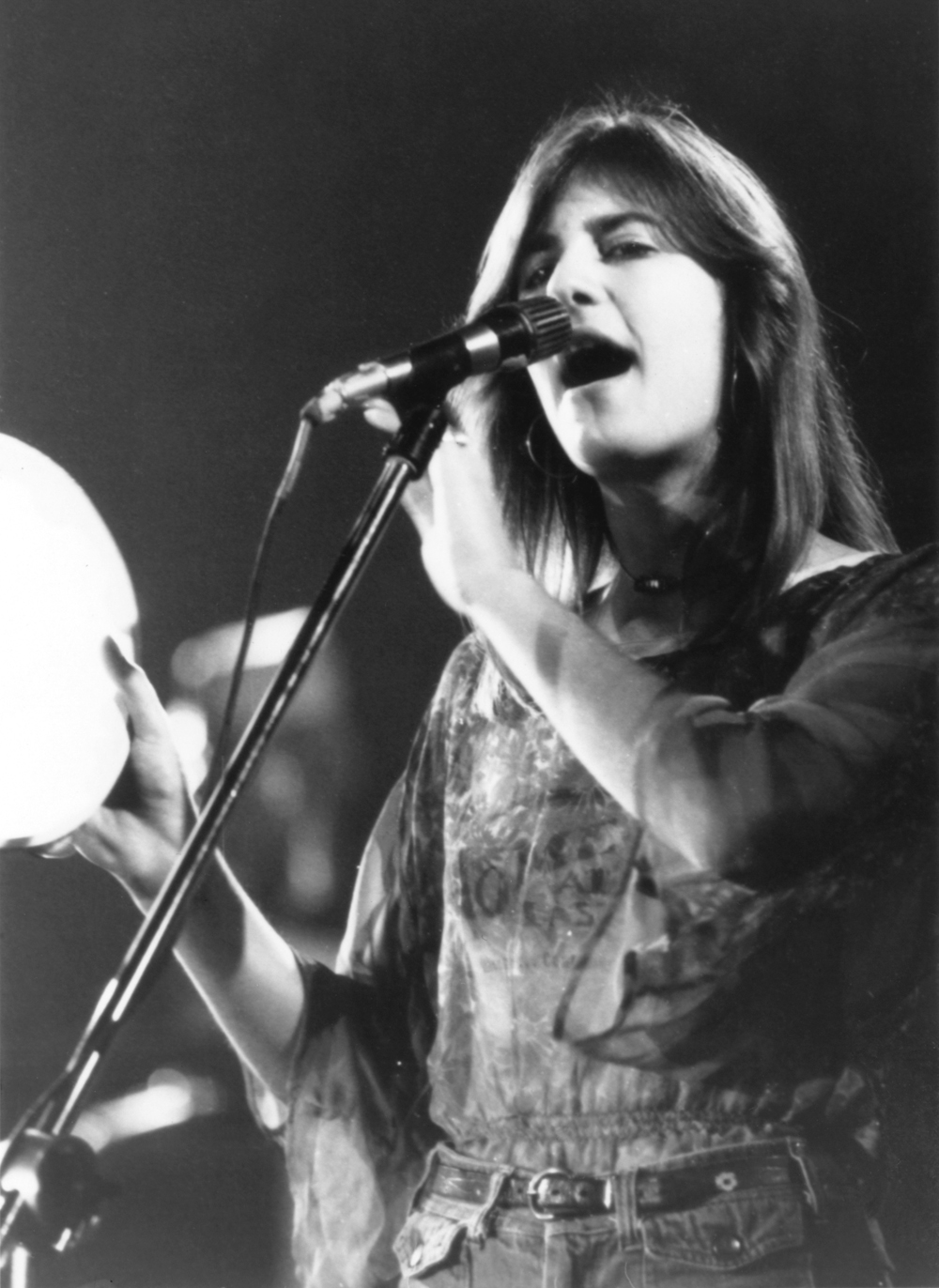
- Detroit performing with Eric Clapton on tour in San Bernardino, California, on August 15, 1975

Background information
- Also known as: Marcy Levy
- Born: Marcella Levy; June 21, 1952 (age 74); Detroit, Michigan, U.S.
- Genres: Pop; rock; R&B; soul
- Occupations: Singer; songwriter; musician
- Instruments: Vocals; guitar; harmonica; tambourine
- Years active: 1972–present
- Labels: Polydor; Epic; Warner Bros.; London; AAA
- Member of: Shakespears Sister
- Formerly of: Marcy Levy Band

Marcella Levy (born June 21, 1952), known professionally as Marcy Levy and (later in her career) Marcella Detroit, is an American singer, songwriter, and guitarist. She co-wrote the 1977 Eric Clapton hit "Lay Down Sally" and released her debut studio album Marcella in 1982. She joined Shakespears Sister in 1988 with ex-Bananarama member Siobhan Fahey. Their first two studio albums, Sacred Heart (1989) and Hormonally Yours (1992), both reached the top 10 of the UK Albums Chart. Detroit sang the lead vocals on their biggest hit, "Stay", which spent eight consecutive weeks at number one on the UK Singles Chart in 1992. Detroit left the band in 1993 and had a UK top 20 hit with "I Believe" in 1994. She formed the Marcy Levy Band in 2002, and finished third in the 2010 ITV series Popstar to Operastar.

== Career ==
=== 1970–1987: Early career and Marcella ===
Detroit-born Marcy Levy began playing for different bands in her home city during the early 1970s. The first major act she worked with was Bob Seger who signed her band "Julia" up to tour with him. She sang backing vocals on his studio album Back in '72 (1973), which was recorded at Leon Russell's Grand Lake studio. Detroit was then asked by Russell to join him on tour, which she later did. After moving to Tulsa, Oklahoma to further pursue her musical career, she and her then-current band were hired by Eric Clapton for touring. She sang backing and group vocals on Clapton's studio album There's One in Every Crowd (1975), and toured and recorded with him for the next four years. While working with Clapton, she sang backing vocals on some of his most enduring songs, including "Lay Down Sally" (which she co-wrote), "Promises", and "Wonderful Tonight". She co-wrote and sang lead vocals on "Roll It" on Clapton's studio album Backless (1978) and dueted with Clapton on "The Core", which she also co-wrote with Clapton. During this period, she began working on her debut solo studio album with producer David Foster in the mid-late 1970s signed to RSO Records. For unknown reasons however, the album was shelved and remained unfinished. Marcy later stopped working with Clapton to focus more on her own solo career, but rejoined him when they performed at Live Aid where she added backing vocals. Whilst working on her debut studio album, she was singing and songwriting for numerous artists including Aretha Franklin, Burt Bacharach, Carole Bayer Sager, Stanley Clarke, Chaka Khan, Belinda Carlisle, and Al Jarreau.

Marcy duetted with Alice Cooper on his 1978 studio album From the Inside (producer David Foster) on the song "Millie and Billie". She provided backing vocals on the 1980 hit "Lookin' for Love" (#5 Pop and #1 Country) by Johnny Lee. Also in 1980, she sang a duet with Robin Gibb, "Help Me!", which was featured on the official soundtrack of the film Times Square. The song was released as a single, and reached number 50 on the US Billboard Hot 100. She also sang a duet on Jimmy Ruffin's studio album Sunrise; "Where Do I Go", and in 1981 was featured on the official soundtrack of American Pop on "Somebody to Love". During this period, Detroit was signed to Epic Records and released her debut studio album, Marcella in 1982. The album failed to appear on any major charts, and after the commercial failure of the album, Epic Records refused Detroit tour allowance with John Mellencamp, and she was later dropped by the label. She wrote and provided backing vocals for "Tangled in Love" with Richard Feldman, which appeared on Eric Clapton's 1985 studio album Behind the Sun. Following this, she was asked by Clapton to start to work with him again, and after another year of touring with him, she once more left to pursue her own solo career. Detroit (credited as Marcy Levy) released an LP together with Diane Reeves in 1985, titled Ballerina, where she performs three songs, "Ballerina", "Pretty Polly" and "Always a Woman in Love". Also credited as Marcy Levy, she sang a duet with Max Carl, "Come and Follow Me" for the movie Short Circuit 1 in 1986; however, no movie soundtrack album was ever released. Detroit was featured in 1988 on the official soundtrack of Mac and Me, on the song "You Knew What You Were Doing".

=== 1988–1993: Shakespears Sister ===
Detroit met Bananarama member Siobhan Fahey through a mutual friend, songwriting partner Richard Feldman. At the time, Fahey had been contemplating leaving the band for her solo brainchild project Shakespears Sister. Feldman had invited Detroit as a songwriting aid. During this period, Fahey suggested to Detroit that she change her name to "give me a sort of new lease of life and to get me disassociated with my background vocal past/entity". Detroit continued to work as a "hired hand" until Fahey's husband Dave Stewart of Eurythmics suggest the two form a band, which was backed by Feldman, Fahey's management and her record company, London Records. Detroit officially became a member of the band after the release of the first Shakespears Sister single, "Break My Heart (You Really) / Heroine". Their second single "You're History" reached the top 10 in the UK, as did their debut studio album Sacred Heart, which was certified Gold by the BPI. Two further singles were released from Sacred Heart, "Run Silent" and "Dirty Mind", both of which failed to reach the UK top 50.

In late 1991, Shakespears Sister released the first single from their second studio album Hormonally Yours, "Goodbye Cruel World", which was also a commercial failure, failing to peak within the UK top 50. The second single however, "Stay", marked Shakespears Sister's first and only number one, staying at the top of the UK charts for eight consecutive weeks, and also found similar success in international charts. Hormonally Yours was released the following month, and was certified 2× Platinum by the BPI. The duo continued to enjoy success with further singles from Hormonally Yours; "I Don't Care" peaked at number seven, "Hello (Turn Your Radio On)" at number 14, and a re-release of "Goodbye Cruel World" at number 32.

During this period, however, tensions began to arise between the two. A concert at the Royal Albert Hall was cancelled due to Fahey's own personal issues at the time, and the two decided to put Shakespears Sister on hiatus for Detroit to release her new solo studio album, which she had been working on at the time, and also for Fahey to "take that time off to be with her family." During this period, "My 16th Apology", the fifth and final single from Hormonally Yours, was released; given that neither member was able to promote it, it was a commercial failure, reaching number 63 on the UK charts. Detroit found out that Fahey had ended her partnership with her at the 1993 Ivor Novello Awards ceremony through Fahey's publisher when Hormonally Yours won "Best Contemporary Collection of Songs". Detroit and Fahey did not speak to or see each other for 25 years, before eventually meeting up and talking again in 2018.

=== 1994–2001: Jewel, Feeler, and Dancing Madly Sideways ===
After leaving Shakespears Sister in 1993, Detroit began her own solo career also with London Records. Her second studio album, and her first since leaving the duo, Jewel was released in March 1994 preceded by "I Believe", which reached number 11 in the UK. The album itself reached number 15 and was certified silver by the BPI. Jewel received mixed reviews from critics: Aaron Badgley from AllMusic commented "[Chris Thomas] seems to steer Marcella into mid-'90s dance grooves, which does not always fit her own distinctive sound". Three more singles followed; "Ain't Nothing Like the Real Thing" (a duet with Elton John), "I'm No Angel", and "Perfect World", which peaked at number 24, 33, and 134 respectively.

Detroit left London Records sometime in 1995. She released her third studio album Feeler in September 1996 under various labels; in the UK it was released under AAA Records, in some European territories under Mega Records, in others Silvertone Records. The album did not chart in the UK, or any other territories except Japan, where under Sony Records it peaked at number 82. Four singles were released, "I Hate You Now...", "Somebody's Mother", "Boy", and "Flower". "I Hate You Now..." and "Boy" peaked at number 107, and 102 respectively. A live album, Without Medication Plus MTV "Buzz Live", was released promotionally in Japan in 1996. In the same year, she guest-starred in two episodes of Absolutely Fabulous as an angel. Over the course of the two episodes, five original songs by Detroit feature in numerous scenes, which were later released in 1999 on Abfab Songs. The same year, Detroit released Demoz, a double-CD collection of demos. Her fourth solo album, Dancing Madly Sideways was released in July 2001 under Detroit's own independent label Banned Records, which would later be retitled Lofi Records. The album was preceded by one single, "Lust for Like", and a three-track sampler EP, Limited Edition. None of these releases charted internationally. In 2002, she featured on Aurora's single "If You Could Read My Mind".

=== 2002–2008: Marcy Levy Band ===
After Dancing Madly Sideways, Detroit formed her self-titled blues band (named after her birth name and original stage name); the Marcy Levy Band, with Michael Fell on harmonica, Job Striles on guitar, Rick Reed on bass, and Max Bangwell on drums. Detroit described the project as "getting back to my roots, the stuff that inspired me in the first place. So I decided to contact all my blues friends and do a record." Their debut EP Button Fly Blues received a limited release under Handmade Records, Detroit and the band's only release with the label. During this era, she toured with Carlos Guitarlos, and began songwriting for artists including Charlotte Church and Alex Parks, among others. The Marcy Levy Band released their debut studio album The Upside of Being Down in July 2006 under Detroit's independent label Lofi Records. In April 2007, she featured on Loverush U.K.'s single "Mystery to Me". In 2008, she also featured on "My Friend Misery" by Vacuum.

=== 2009–2018: Popstar to Operastar, The Vehicle, and Gray Matterz ===
In 2009, the Marcy Levy Band split. In the same year, Detroit featured on two tracks, "Fantasy" and "Paint You a Picture", of the album Rising from the Bushes, by Alex Dixon (grandson of Willie Dixon). As of mid-2009, Detroit had been working on two separate solo studio albums; Skin I'm In, produced by Larry Klein, and The Vehicle, a more personal project, and is to coincide with the release of her autobiography of the same name. In January 2010 Detroit participated in Series 1 of the British ITV1 celebrity reality television show Popstar to Operastar. She finished as a joint semi-finalist alongside Kym Marsh in week 5 of the competition. When the voting statistics were released it was revealed that she had more votes than Marsh; therefore she came third overall. She was also only three percent behind Darius Campbell Danesh, who went on to become the winner of the season. In 2010, she released a single titled "All is Forgiven", based on the Irish Prayer, which has since been removed from the iTunes Store. In November 2011, Detroit released her first Christmas EP Happy Holiday, consisting of classic covers and an original song of the same name.

In May 2012, Detroit released her first single in two years; "Madison's Light" as a tribute to her niece, who died at the age of five months. Five months after the release of the single, Detroit officially set up the not-for-profit charity organization "The Madison Morr Foundation" for children in need. Detroit was featured on the song "Yell Cut" among numerous artists including Anthony Costa, originally written by aspiring singer Natasha Anastasi, who was killed in a car accident in 2005. The song was recorded for and included on Anastasi's tribute album Natasha, released in June 2012 consisting of songs performed by Anastasi and other artists. In August 2012, Detroit announced James Gadson would be featuring on her "new album" (which one hasn't been specified) and would be performing on her tour with her, which opened on September 20, 2012 in Largo, Florida. In September 2012, she released a new single "Love, Faith, and Hope", which was intended to be the official anthem of the Belgrade Pride festival, which was cancelled by the Serbian government due to security reasons. In November 2012, Detroit released her second Christmas EP, entitled Holiday 2012, and confirmed on her official Facebook page that both studio albums (Skin I'm In and The Vehicle) were completed, and awaiting release for early 2013.

It was announced in December 2012 that Detroit was expecting to release both albums internationally on Valentine's Day, 2013. She was developing an official app, to be released free, containing exclusive information "you won't be able to find anywhere else". A supporting tour backed by London session organisation The AllStars Collective, the Vehicle Jump Start Tour, opened on April 28, 2013 in Milton Keynes, United Kingdom. Detroit announced in February 2013 that she had signed with Right Recordings, a UK-based label with "major distribution through Universal".

=== 2019–present: Shakespears Sister reunion ===
In May 2019, it was announced that Detroit would reunite with Fahey as Shakespears Sister on stage later in the year. A UK tour, titled Shakespears Sister Ride Again, was announced during the same month, and was launched in Nottingham on 31 October 2019, before playing 13 other gigs across the UK during the following month. A new single by the band, "All the Queen's Horses", was released on 15 May, with an accompanying music video. This was followed by the compilation album, Singles Party, in July 2019.

The duo performed "Stay" on The Graham Norton Show on 10 May 2019; this was their first TV performance together since 1993. They also announced that they were recording an EP of new material; this turned out to be the Ride Again mini-album, which charted at number 69 in the UK Albums chart in November 2019.

In 2021, Detroit appeared on a cover version of Robbie Williams' "Angels", recorded for charity with Tony Hadley of Spandau Ballet, Jools Holland, Clem Burke of Blondie and Glen Matlock of the Sex Pistols. In June 2021, she talked about her time working with Eric Clapton and Alice Cooper on an episode of Sounds of the 70s with Johnnie Walker on BBC Radio 2.

In 2026, Detroit appeared as Gargoyle on ITV's The Masked Singer in which she got eliminated in the fourth episode.

== Songwriting career ==
Detroit has co-written many songs for other artists, starting when she was part of Eric Clapton's backing band in the 1970s. She most famously co-wrote "Lay Down Sally" for him, which was a #3 hit in the USA in 1978, and contributed other songs for his albums No Reason to Cry (1976), Slowhand (1977), and Backless (1978).

During the 1980s, she established a lasting songwriting partnership with songwriter Richard Feldman, co-writing many songs for other artists. Also, Feldman and Detroit collaborated on songs of Shakespears Sister and co-wrote most of Detroit's 1982 Marcella album, and both appear on the album cover art. Among the artists both co-wrote for are:

- Bobbi Walker, "You're the One" (1980)
- Patty Weaver, "Somebody's Gonna Get Hurt" (1982)
- Three Dog Night, "Somebody's Gonna Get Hurt" (1983)
- Jennifer Rush, "Nobody Move" (1984)
- Eric Clapton, "Tangled in Love" (1985)
- Eric Clapton, "Walk Away" (1986)
- Chaka Khan, "So Close" (1986)
- Amii Stewart, "Sometimes a Stranger" (1988)
- Belinda Carlisle, "Little Black Book" (1991)

In the mid-1980s, Detroit collaborated with songwriters Billie Hughes and Roxanne Seeman. Among the songs they wrote together is Philip Bailey's "Walking on the Chinese Wall", which hit #34 in the UK and #46 in the US. They also wrote songs for Randy Crawford, Al Jarreau and Pernilla Wahlgren.

Detroit also co-wrote metal band Vixen's 1989 single "Love Made Me", which was a top 40 hit in the UK.

Detroit has written songs for Alex Parks, Charlotte Church, Billie Myers, Marti Pellow and Joe McElderry among others.

== Personal life ==
Detroit is a Jewish American with ancestral links to Poland and Latvia.

Detroit is married to Lance Aston (one-time member of Prima Donna and brother of Bucks Fizz star Jay Aston). They have a son, born in 1991.

== Awards and nominations ==
Award	Year	Nominee(s)	Category	Result	Ref.
BMI London Awards	2004	"Lay Down Sally"	3 Million Award	Won	

== Discography ==
- Marcella (1982)
- Jewel (1994)
- Feeler (1996)
- Dancing Madly Sideways (2001)
- The Vehicle (2013)
- For the Holidays (2013)
- Gray Matterz (2015)
- Made in Detroit (2021)
- Gold (2021)

== Marcy Levy Band discography ==
=== Studio albums ===
Title	Album details
The Upside of Being Down	Released: July 26, 2006; Formats: CD, digital download; Label: Lofi

=== Extended plays ===
Title	Album details
Button Fly Blues	Released: 2003; Formats: CD; Label: Hand Made

== Filmography ==
Year	Title	Role	Notes
1978	Sgt. Pepper's Lonely Hearts Club Band	Our Guests at Heartland	Credited as Marcy Levy
1990	Beyond the Groove	Musician / Hitchhiker	1 episode
1996	Absolutely Fabulous	Angel	2 episodes
1998	This Town	Tracy Landau	Main role
