= Robin Gibb discography =

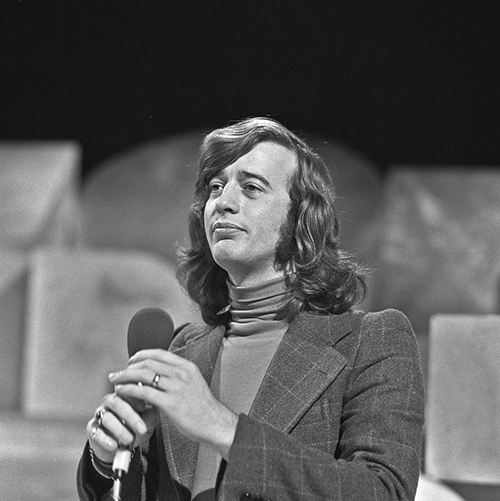
- Gibb performs on Dutch television network AVRO programme TopPop in 1973.
- Studio albums: 8
- Extended plays: 1
- Live albums: 2
- Singles: 21

This is a discography of works by British singer-songwriter Robin Gibb as a solo artist. For information about recordings made by the Bee Gees see Bee Gees discography. Gibb's entire song catalogue is published by Universal Music Publishing Group.

== Albums ==
=== Studio albums ===
Year	Title	Peak chart positions						
Year	Title	UK	GER	SWI	ITA	NZ	CAN	US
1970	Robin's Reign: Released: February 1970; Label: Polydor (worldwide) Atco (US/Canada)	—	19	—	—	—	77	—
1983	How Old Are You?: Released: May 1983; Label: Polydor	—	6	26	13	22	—	—
1984	Secret Agent: Released: June 1984; Label: Polydor (worldwide) Mirage (North America)	—	19	20	—	—	—	204
1985	Walls Have Eyes: Released: November 1985; Label: EMI America (North America) Polydor (worldwide)	—	—	—	—	—	—	—
2003	Magnet: Released: February 2003; Label: SPV GmbH	43	10	—	—	—	—	—
2006	My Favourite Christmas Carols: Released: November 2006; Label: Koch (North America) Edel (Germany)	—	—	—	—	—	—	—
2014	50 St. Catherine's Drive: Released: 29 September 2014; Label: Rhino	70	39	—	—	—	—	—
2015	Sing Slowly Sisters: Recorded: January–April 1970; Not One Label (Robin Gibb)	__	__	__	__	__	__	__
"—" denotes a release that did not chart or not released in that region.

=== Live albums ===
Year	Title
2005	Robin Gibb Live with the Neue Philharmonie Orchestra
2011	Robin Gibb Live with the Danish National Orchestra

=== Extended plays ===
Year	Title
1985	Robin Gibb

== Singles ==
Year	Song	Peak chart Positions								Certifications (sales thresholds)	Album
Year	Song	UK	AUS	AUT	GER	NLD	NZ	US	US Cash Box	Certifications (sales thresholds)	Album
1969	"Saved by the Bell"	2	9	3	3	1	—	—	—		Robin's Reign
1969	"One Million Years"	—	49	19	14	5	11	—	—		Robin's Reign
1970	"August October"	45	—	—	12	—	11	—	—		Robin's Reign
1978	"Oh! Darling"	—	—	—	—	—	—	15	24		Sgt. Pepper's Lonely Hearts Club Band
1980	"Help Me!" (with Marcy Levy)	—	—	—	—	—	—	50	65		Times Square OST
1983	"Juliet"	94	70	2	1	14	—	104	—		How Old Are You?
1983	"Another Lonely Night in New York"	71	—	—	16	—	—	—	—		How Old Are You?
1983	"How Old Are You"	93	—	—	37	—	—	—	—		How Old Are You?
1984	"Boys Do Fall in Love"	107	48	—	21	—	—	37	50		Secret Agent
1984	"Secret Agent"	—	—	—	—	—	—	—	—		Secret Agent
1985	"Like a Fool"	—	—	—	—	—	—	—	—		Walls Have Eyes
1985	"Toys"	—	—	—	—	—	—	—	—		Walls Have Eyes
2003	"Please"	23	—	—	51	—	48	—	—		Magnet
2003	"Wait Forever"	—	—	—	—	—	—	—	—		Magnet
2003	"My Lover's Prayer" (with Alistair Griffin)	5	—	—	—	—	—	—	—		Bring It On (Alistair Griffin album)
2005	"First of May" (with G4)	—	—	—	—	—	—	—	—		G4 & Friends (G4 album)
2006	"Mother of Love"	—	—	—	—	—	—	—	—		My Favourite Christmas Carols
2007	"Too Much Heaven" (with US5)	—	—	26	7	—	—	—	—		In Control - Reloaded (US5 album)
2008	"Wing and a Prayer"	—	—	—	—	—	—	—	—		Non-album single
2009	"(Barry) Islands in the Stream"	1	—	—	—	—	—	—	—		Islands in the Stream (Comic Relief album)
2011	"I've Gotta Get a Message to You" (with The Soldiers)	75	—	—	—	—	—	—	—		Message to You (The Soldiers album)
2012	"Don't Cry Alone"	—	—	—	—	—	—	—	—		The Titanic Requiem
2014	"I Am the World"	—	—	—	—	—	—	—	—		50 St. Catherine's Drive
2014	"Days of Wine and Roses"	—	—	—	—	—	—	—	—		50 St. Catherine's Drive

== Other credits ==
- The Titanic Requiem - Credited as "Composed by Robin Gibb and RJ Gibb" by Royal Philharmonic Orchestra
