= Robin Gibb (EP) =

EP by Robin Gibb
- Released: 1985 (German Democratic Republic)
- Recorded: 1982–1984
- Genre: New wave; synth-pop
- Label: Amiga
- Producer: Robin Gibb, Maurice Gibb, Dennis Bryon, Mark Liggett, Chris Barbosa

Robin Gibb is the first EP released by British singer-songwriter Robin Gibb, released in 1985 on Amiga Records in the German Democratic Republic only.

"Juliet" was originally released as the first single from his 1983 album How Old Are You?. "How Old Are You" was the third single released from the album. "Boys Do Fall in Love" was originally released as the first single from his 1984 album Secret Agent, and "Robot" was also from the same album.

== Track listing ==
- All tracks written and composed by Robin and Maurice Gibb.

Disc one
No.	Title	Length
1.	"Juliet"	3:45
2.	"How Old Are You"	3:09

Disc two
No.	Title	Length
1.	"Boys Do Fall in Love"	3:50
2.	"Robot"	3:42
