= How Old Are You? =

How Old Are You? may refer to:

- How Old Are You? (album), a 1983 solo album, by Robin Gibb
  - "How Old Are You?" (Robin Gibb song)
- "How Old Are You?" (Miko Mission song), 1984
- How Old Are You? (film), a 2014 Malayalam-language movie starring Manju Warrier
