= My Favourite Christmas Carols =

Studio album by Robin Gibb
- Released: 21 November 2006; 10 November 2006 (Hong Kong)
- Recorded: August – September 2006; Dublin, Ireland and London, England
- Genre: Christmas; R&B
- Length: 31:12 (American release)
- Label: Koch (United States); Edel (Germany); Evolution (Hong Kong)
- Producer: Kwesi Graves

Robin Gibb studio albums chronology
Magnet (2003)	My Favourite Christmas Carols (2006)	50 St. Catherine's Drive (2014)

Singles from My Favourite Christmas Carols
- 1. "Mother of Love" Released: November 2006

My Favourite Christmas Carols is the sixth studio album by Robin Gibb. Released in November 2006, it was the final studio album to be released in his lifetime and was his only album to be composed entirely of Christmas songs, of which most featured in this album are traditional.

The album was recorded from August to September 2006.

== Album information ==
Recording took place in Dublin and London. The last song, "The First Noël" has new lyrics written by Gibb. The instrumental tracks are by Kwesi Graves (Although credited as Michael Graves on Magnet) including pipe organ and string sections and sometimes they push envelope with percussion beats. His version of "Good King Wenceslas" is missing two verses.

The album contains "Come Some Christmas Eve Or Halloween" a song by the Bee Gees from 1968 on Idea sessions. My Favourite Christmas Carols was released on 21 November 2006 at Germany by Edel Records, Hong Kong by Evolution Records and in the United States by Koch Records. The American release of the album omitted "Come Some Christmas Eve Or Halloween", "Ellan Vannin" and the medley. "Mother of Love" was released as a single the same month as the album, and was available to download on Musicload.

== Track listing ==
=== German release ===
No.	Title	Writer(s)	Length
1.	"Mother of Love"	Robin Gibb	3:14
2.	"In the Bleak Midwinter"	Christina Rossetti	3:58
3.	"O Come, All ye Faithful"	John Francis Wade; Frederick Oakeley (English lyrics)
4.	"Silent Night"	Joseph Mohr, Franz Gruber	4:17
5.	"God Rest Ye Merry, Gentlemen"	Traditional	2:34
6.	"Good King Wenceslas"	Traditional; John Mason Neale (lyrics)	2:12
7.	"Away in a Manger"	Traditional; William J. Kirkpatrick (music)	2:33
8.	"Once in Royal David's City"	Cecil Frances Alexander; Henry John Gauntlett (music)	3:03
9.	"Three Ships"	Traditional	1:16
10.	"Hark! The Herald Angels Sing"	Charles Wesley; Felix Mendelssohn (music), William H. Cummings (1855 adaptation)	2:27
11.	"Noël"	Robin Gibb; Traditional (additional lyrics)	5:18
12.	"Come Some Christmas Eve Or Halloween"	Barry Gibb, Robin Gibb, Maurice Gibb	3:30
13.	"Ellan Vannin"	Eliza S. Craven Green; Barry Gibb, Robin Gibb, Maurice Gibb (additional lyrics)	3:33
14.	"In the Bleak Midwinter/O Come All Ye Faithful/Hark! The Herald Angels Sing/While Shepherds Watched Their Flocks"	Christina Rossetti, John Francis Wade, Frederick Oakeley, Charles Wesley, Felix Mendelssohn, William H. Cummings, Christopher Tye	5:44

=== American release ===
No.	Title	Length
1.	"In the Bleak Midwinter"	3:58
2.	"O Come, All ye Faithful"	2:54
3.	"Silent Night"	4:17
4.	"God Rest Ye Merry, Gentlemen"	2:34
5.	"Good King Wenceslas"	2:12
6.	"Away in a Manger"	2:33
7.	"Once in Royal David's City"	3:03
8.	"Three Ships"	1:16
9.	"Hark! The Herald Angels Sing"	2:27
10.	"Noël"	5:18
Total length:		31:12

Bonus tracks
No.	Title	Length
1.	"A Personal Christmas Moment With Robin Gibb"	10:23

== Personnel ==
- Robin Gibb – vocals
- Kwesi Graves – Hammond organ, synthesizer, guitar, programming, choir arrangement
- The Serlo Consort – background vocals
- The Children's Choir of St Giles and St George, Ashtead – background vocals
- Kit Persona-Wright – choir arrangement
- Savvas Iossifidis – engineer
