= 50 St. Catherine's Drive =

Studio album by Robin Gibb
- Released: 29 September 2014
- Recorded: 2007–2014
- Genre: Soul, contemporary R&B, neo soul
- Length: 1:05:45
- Label: Rhino
- Producer: Peter-John Vettese

Robin Gibb studio albums chronology
My Favourite Christmas Carols (2006)	50 St. Catherine's Drive (2014)	Sing Slowly Sisters (2015)

Singles from 50 St. Catherine's Drive
- 1. "I Am the World" Released: 11 September 2014; 2. "Days of Wine and Roses" Released: 12 September 2014

50 St. Catherine's Drive is the seventh and final album by singer-songwriter Robin Gibb, released on 29 September 2014 in the United Kingdom and 30 September 2014 in the United States on Rhino Records two years after his death in 2012. The album was named after the address on the Isle of Man where Gibb and his family lived. The album was also co-produced and remastered by his son Robin-John Gibb (RJ Gibb) who had previously composed the album Titanic Requiem with his father. The album reached No. 70 in the United Kingdom and No. 39 in Germany.

For 50 St. Catherine's Drive, Robin-John also composed and produced, with his father, the songs ‘Instant Love’ and ‘One Way Love’ the latter song ‘One Way Love’ which Robin and Robin-John both composed and produced along with their long-term family friend, former BBC DJ and host of ‘Top of the Pops’ Mike Read and the former song ‘Instant Love’ features Robin-John singing with his father. The final track ‘Sydney’ is the last song ever recorded by Robin Gibb, a song which he had intended to sing together with Barry, however his health would not permit it, and the duet would never be. So Robin-John (RJ) called Elliot Cohen who owns the famous Red Bus Recording Studios in London, reserved a space for a month, and eventually emerged after finally producing a poignant song worthy of airplay and commercial release, from what was originally a rough iPad GarageBand recorded demo. As well as the production of ‘Sydney’ all the other unreleased tracks were remastered at Red Bus Recording Studios in London.

== Background ==
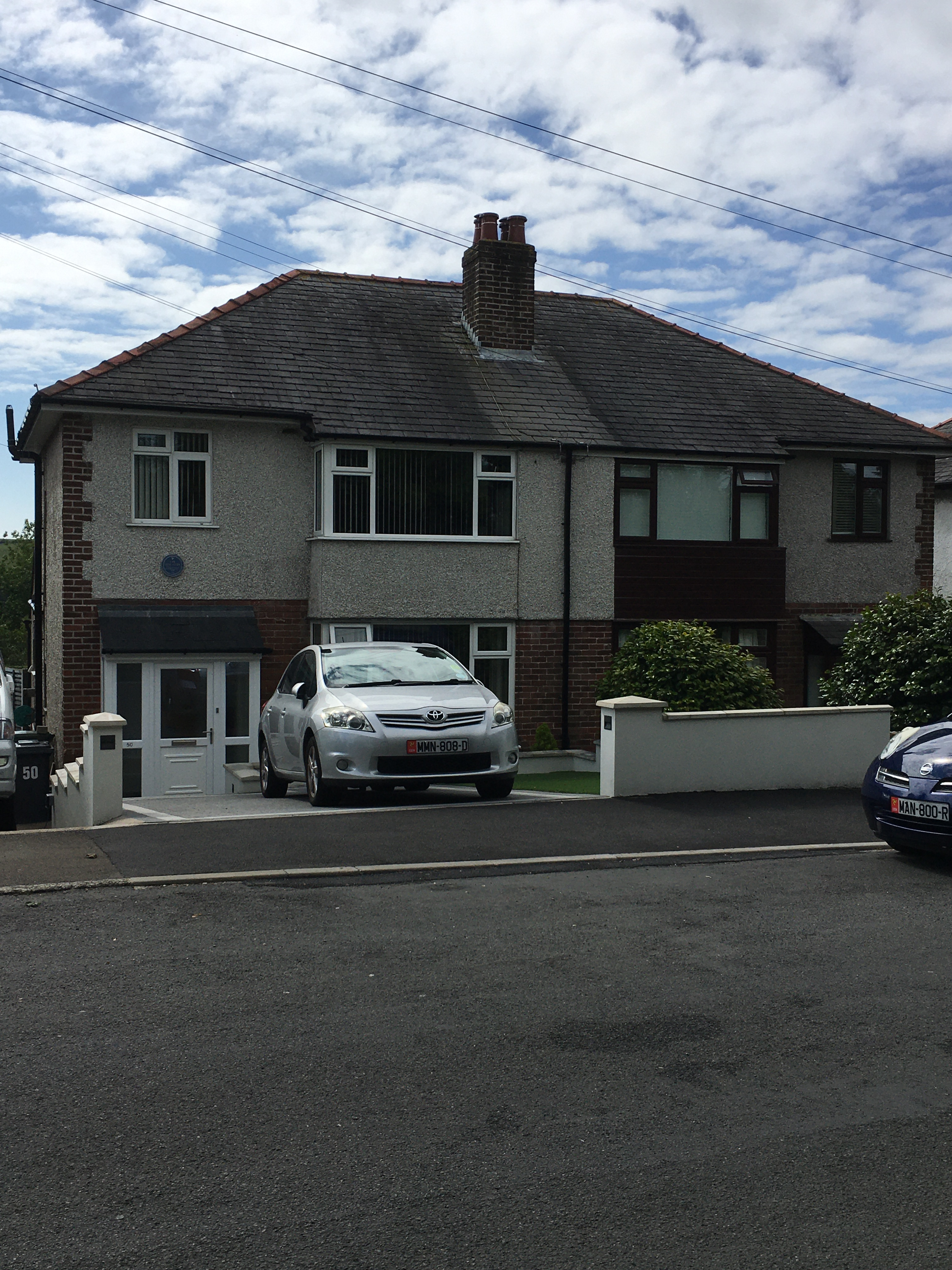
50 St Catherine's Drive; childhood home of the Bee Gees.

In December 2007, Gibb told the BBC radio that he was working on a new studio album to release it in 2008. A new title he mentioned was "Days of Wine and Roses" and later in February 2008, he claimed on Dubai Radio that the song was a possible single. He also recorded a remake of "Avalanche", a 1970 song from his unreleased studio album Sing Slowly Sisters. In March 2008, Gibb revealed that he was working with Peter-John Vettese of Jethro Tull again.

A remake of "I Am the World" from 1966, which was written by him, was rewritten with Vettese. "Alan Freeman Days" was previously released in Songs from the British Academy, Volume 1. The original version of "Instant Love", with son Robin-John Gibb on lead vocals, was released on the soundtrack of Blood Type – The Search, while the newer version of the song that was included on this album features Robin singing the first verse and Robin-John singing the second verse (with both on the chorus). "Sydney" was previously released as a single in 2011 — the last song Gibb recorded.

== Track listing ==
All tracks are written by Robin Gibb and Peter-John Vettese, except where noted.

No.	Title	Writer(s)	Length
1.	"Days of Wine and Roses"		4:15
2.	"Instant Love"	Robin Gibb, Robin-John Gibb	4:22
3.	"Alan Freeman Days"	Robin Gibb	3:56
4.	"Wherever You Go"	Robin Gibb	3:29
5.	"I Am the World"		3:57
6.	"Mother of Love"	Robin Gibb	2:46
7.	"Anniversary"		3:47
8.	"Sorry"		4:14
9.	"Cherish"		3:43
10.	"Don't Cry Alone"		3:24
11.	"Avalanche"		3:31
12.	"One Way Love"	Robin Gibb, Mike Read	4:05
13.	"Broken Wings"	Robin Gibb	4:26
14.	"Sanctuary"		3:36
15.	"Solid"		4:26
16.	"All We Have Is Now"		4:03
17.	"Sydney"	Robin Gibb	3:45

Japanese edition bonus tracks
No.	Title	Writer(s)	Length
18.	"All That I Cherish" (demo)	Robin Gibb, Michael Graves	3:55

== Personnel ==
- Robin Gibb – vocals
- Peter John Vettese – guitar, bass, keyboards, drums, programming, backing vocals
- Mark "Tufty" Evans – engineer

== Charts ==
Chart (2014)	Peak position
Belgian Albums (Ultratop Flanders)	143
Dutch Albums (MegaCharts)	55
German Albums (Official Top 100)	39
UK Albums (OCC)	70
