= Magnet (album) =

Studio album by Robin Gibb
- Released: February 2003
- Recorded: 2002
- Genre: British R&B
- Length: 43:13
- Label: SPV GmbH
- Producer: Deacon Smith; Grant Mitchell ("Wait Forever"); Michael Graves ("Please" and "Love Hurts")

Robin Gibb chronology
Walls Have Eyes (1985)	Magnet (2003)	My Favourite Christmas Carols (2006)

Singles from Magnet
- 1. "Please" Released: January 2003 (UK), December 2002 (GER); 2. "Wait Forever" Released: June 2003 (GER)

Professional ratings
Review scores
Source	Rating
Allmusic	2.5/5 stars
The Guardian	2/5 stars
Uncut	1/5 stars

Magnet is the fifth solo album by Robin Gibb of the Bee Gees, released in 2003, just two weeks after the death of his twin brother and bandmate, Maurice.

The song "Love Hurts" was originally recorded by The Everly Brothers, and he re-recorded the songs "Another Lonely Night in New York" (originally released in 1983 on How Old Are You?) and "Wish You Were Here" (released in 1989, from the Bee Gees' album One).

"Please" was edited to 3:59 for its single version, while "Wait Forever" was edited to 3:37. The Shanghai Surprise mix version of "Wait Forever" with a length of 6:52 was also released in 2003, and was produced by Craig Jones and Porl Young.

== Track listing ==
No.	Title	Writer(s)	Length
1.	"Please"	Michael Graves, Errol Reid	4:33
2.	"Don't Wanna Wait Forever"	Graham Dickson, Grant Mitchell, Paul Holmes, John Purser, Gary Miller	4:20
3.	"Wish You Were Here"	Barry Gibb, Robin Gibb, Maurice Gibb	3:11
4.	"No Doubt"	Deconzo Smith, Kenneth Mangram	3:37
5.	"Special"	D. Smith, Jud Mahoney, Mike Hamilton	3:41
6.	"Inseparable"	R. Gibb, D. Smith	3:30
7.	"Don't Rush"	D. Smith, Emmanuel Officer	3:59
8.	"Watching You"	D. Smith, E. Officer	3:59
9.	"Earth Angel"	D. Smith, E. Officer	3:57
10.	"Another Lonely Night in New York"	R. Gibb, M. Gibb	4:30
11.	"Love Hurts"	Boudleaux Bryant	3:56

== Personnel ==
- Robin Gibb – lead vocals
- Deconzo Smith – keyboards, guitar, bass guitar
- Janyelle Crawford – backing vocals on "No Doubt"
- Shane Dement – backing vocals on "No Doubt"
- Jud Mahoney – backing vocals on "Special"
- Emmanuel Officer – backing vocals on "Don't Rush", "Watching You", "Earth Angel"
- Grant Mitchell – keyboards, synthesizer, programming, backing vocals on "Wait Forever"
- Kevin Brown – guitar on "Wait Forever"
- Paul Holmes – backing vocals on "Wait Forever"
- Errol Reid – backing vocals on "Wait Forever", "Please", "Love Hurts"
- Graham Kearns – guitar on "Love Hurts"
- Michael Graves – keyboards, synthesizer and programming on "Please"

== Chart performance ==
"Please"
Charts	Peak position
UK Singles (Official Charts Company)	23
Germany (Media Control Charts)	51
New Zealand (Recorded Music NZ)	48
