= Oh! Darling =

1969 song by The Beatles

- Picture sleeve for the 1970 Japanese single release

Song by the Beatles

from the album Abbey Road
- Released: 26 September 1969
- Recorded: 20 April – 11 August 1969
- Studio: EMI, London
- Genre: Rock and roll; R&B; doo-wop; hard rock; swamp pop
- Length: 3:27
- Label: Apple
- Songwriter: Lennon–McCartney
- Producer: George Martin

"Oh! Darling" is a song by the English rock band the Beatles, appearing as the fourth song on their eleventh studio album Abbey Road (1969). It was written by Paul McCartney and credited to Lennon–McCartney. Its working title was "Oh! Darling (I'll Never Do You No Harm)". Although not issued as a single in either the United Kingdom or the United States, a regional subsidiary of Capitol successfully edited it as a single in Central America, having "Maxwell's Silver Hammer" as its B-side. It was also issued as a single in Portugal. Apple Records released "Oh! Darling" in Japan with "Here Comes the Sun" in June 1970.

== Background ==
The song is in the key of A major. George Harrison described the song as "a typical 1950s–'60s-period song because of its chord structure".

McCartney later said of recording the track, "When we were recording 'Oh! Darling' I came into the studios early every day for a week to sing it by myself because at first my voice was too clear. I wanted it to sound as though I'd been performing it on stage all week." He would only try the song once each day; if it was not right he would wait until the next day. According to sound engineer Alan Parsons, McCartney once lamented that "five years ago I could have done this in a flash". In a 1980 interview with Playboy magazine, John Lennon said, "'Oh! Darling' was a great one of Paul's that he didn't sing too well. I always thought I could have done it better – it was more my style than his. He wrote it, so what the hell, he's going to sing it."

== Recording ==
The basic track was recorded on 20 April 1969. There were many overdub sessions, including McCartney's attempts at the lead vocal. According to Ian MacDonald, the backing vocals were "exquisite", but "sadly underplayed in the mix". Engineer Geoff Emerick recalled that McCartney sang while the backing track played over speakers, instead of headphones, because he wanted to feel as though he was singing to a live audience.

=== Get Back sessions ===
McCartney first recorded a demo of "Oh! Darling" at Twickenham Studios on 16 January 1969 during the Get Back sessions without the other Beatles being present, as the Twickenham set they had been using was being dismantled due to their moving the sessions to Apple Corps' headquarters. After an early attempt at the song by the band on 27 January 1969, Lennon announced, "Just heard that Yoko's divorce has just gone through", after which he and the band burst into an improvised version of the song, substituting "I'm free at last" for a part of the lyric. The song and the following improvisation are included on the Beatles Anthology 3 album, released in 1996. This version also features a keyboard part played by Billy Preston.

=== Live versions ===
The song was performed live by Paul McCartney and the Pretenders' Chrissie Hynde during a memorial concert for Foo Fighters drummer Taylor Hawkins on 3 September 2022.

== Style ==
"Oh! Darling" is a rhythm and blues song incorporating elements of doo-wop and the New Orleans rhythm and blues sound popularised during the 1950s and early 1960s by musicians such as Fats Domino; it also seems to have drawn on the Louisiana swamp blues sound found in songs like Slim Harpo's "Rainin' in My Heart" and Charles Brown's "Please Come Home for Christmas". Furthermore, it may have drawn on the related Louisiana genre known today as swamp pop, whose distinctive sound bears an uncanny resemblance to the basic structure of "Oh! Darling" – so much so that some in Louisiana originally thought the song had been recorded by a local musician. (When swamp pop musician John Fred met the Beatles in London in the 1960s, he was shocked to learn that "they were very familiar with Louisiana music.") Fittingly, swamp pop musician Jay Randall eventually covered "Oh! Darling" for the Lanor label of Church Point, Louisiana.

== Personnel ==
According to Ian MacDonald:

- Paul McCartney – lead and backing vocals, bass
- John Lennon – backing vocals, piano
- George Harrison – backing vocals, electric guitar
- Ringo Starr – drums

However, the book accompanying the 2019 box set Abbey Road: Super Deluxe Version lists an alternative line-up:

- Paul McCartney – lead and backing vocals, piano
- John Lennon – backing vocals, guitar
- George Harrison – backing vocals, bass
- Ringo Starr – drums

== Certifications ==
Certifications for "Oh! Darling"
Region	Certification	Certified units/sales
United Kingdom (BPI)	Silver	200,000^{‡}
^{‡} Sales+streaming figures based on certification alone.

== Robin Gibb, Bee Gees version ==
"Oh! Darling"
- Picture sleeve for German and Belgian single releases

Single by Robin Gibb, Bee Gees

from the album Sgt. Pepper's Lonely Hearts Club Band
- B-side: "She's Leaving Home"
- Released: July 1978
- Recorded: September 1977
- Studio: Cherokee (Hollywood)
- Genre: Rhythm and blues, soul
- Length: 3:29
- Label: RSO
- Songwriter: Lennon–McCartney
- Producer: George Martin

Robin Gibb singles chronology
"August October" (1970)	"Oh! Darling" (1978)	"Help Me!" (1980)

Bee Gees singles chronology
"If I Can't Have You" (1977)	"Oh! Darling" (1978)	"Too Much Heaven" (1978)

In 1978, "Oh! Darling" was released on the Sgt. Pepper's Lonely Hearts Club Band soundtrack. It was also released as Robin Gibb's fourth solo single. It reached number 15 on the Billboard pop chart and number 22 in the US Adult Contemporary Charts on 7 October 1978. It was Gibb's highest charting single in the United States.

=== Chart performance ===
Chart (1978)	Peak position
Canada RPM Singles Chart	16
New Zealand RIANZ Singles Chart	40
US Billboard Hot 100	15
US Billboard Hot Adult Contemporary Tracks	22

== Sources ==
- The Beatles (2000). The Beatles Anthology. San Francisco: Chronicle Books. ISBN 0-8118-2684-8.
- Bernard, Shane K. (1993). Swamp Pop: Cajun and Creole Rhythm and Blues. Jackson: University Press of Mississippi.
- Dowlding, William J. (1989). Beatlesongs. New York: Fireside. ISBN 0-671-68229-6.
- Lewisohn, Mark (1988). The Beatles Recording Sessions. New York: Harmony Books. ISBN 0-517-57066-1.
- MacDonald, Ian (2005). Revolution in the Head: The Beatles' Records and the Sixties (Second Revised ed.). London: Pimlico (Rand). ISBN 1-84413-828-3.
- Sheff, David (2000). All We Are Saying: The Last Major Interview with John Lennon and Yoko Ono. New York: St. Martin's Press. ISBN 0-312-25464-4.
