= Alan Freeman Days =

Song by Robin Gibb

from the album Songs from the British Academy Volume 1
- Released: May 2008
- Recorded: August 2007; Sphere Studios, London
- Genre: Alternative rock, pop rock
- Length: 3:39
- Label: Academy Recordings
- Songwriter(s): Robin Gibb
- Producer(s): Peter-John Vettese

"Alan Freeman Days" is a song written by Robin Gibb in 2007 as a tribute to the late Australian-British DJ Alan Freeman and released in May 2008. In 2014, it was included on Gibb's first posthumous album 50 St. Catherine's Drive.

Recorded in August 2007 at Sphere Studios in London. A live performance of the song was released on Robin Gibb - In Concert With the Danish Concert Orchestra.

== Writing ==
While it was mainly made available as a download the song was also included on a limited number of promotional CDs, a various artist compilation "V.1 - Songs from the British Academy" from Academy Recordings, of which a handful were raffled off to fans registered to Robin Gibb's forum. There is also a lyric in the song "and my brother Maurice is stayin alive" as his tribute also to his late twin brother Maurice Gibb.

== Personnel ==
- Robin Gibb — vocals
- Peter-John Vettese — guitar, keyboards, vocals, programming
- Mark "Tufty" Evans — guitar, programming, engineer
- Francesco Cameli — bass
