= Peter Coffield =

American actor

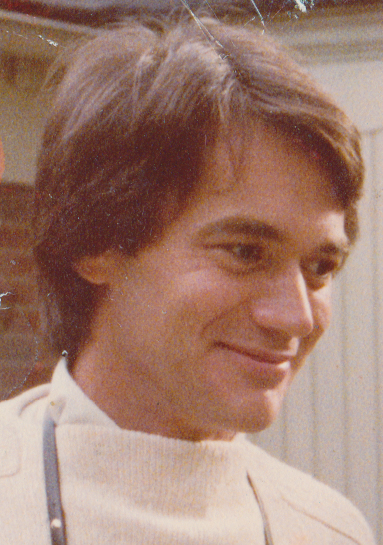
- Born: Peter Tenney Coffield; July 17, 1945; Wilmette, Illinois, U.S.
- Died: November 19, 1983 (aged 38); Manhattan, New York City, U.S.
- Occupation: Actor
- Years active: 1969–1983

Peter Tenny Coffield (July 17, 1945 – November 19, 1983) was an American actor. Coffield worked as an actor in theater, television, and film. He is best known for his role in the film Cry Rape!. His other films include Times Square (1980) and Neil Simon's Only When I Laugh.

== Career ==
Coffield guest starred on several TV shows throughout the 1970s and early 1980s, including The Love Boat, Hart to Hart, Eight Is Enough, Wide World Mystery, Family, ‘’ Barnaby Jones’’ and Love, Sidney, and he acted in TV movies such as Washington: Behind Closed Doors, and The Man Without a Country. He also performed in several plays on Broadway, including Hamlet (1969), Abelard and Heloise (1971), The Merchant of Venice (1973), Tartuffe (1977), and The Man Who Came to Dinner (1980).

In addition to Broadway, Coffield had key roles in Misalliance at the Roundabout Theater, in A. R. Gurney's Middle Ages at the Hartman Theater in Stamford, Conn., and in S. N. Behrman's No Time for Comedy at the McCarter Theater in Princeton, N.J., and he performed at the Kennedy Center for the Performing Arts in Washington and at the Old Globe Shakespeare Festival Theater in San Diego.

In The New York Times review of Coffield's performance as a homosexual student in Abelard and Heloise, theater critic Walter Kerr wrote, "Making a mask of his broad, handsome face, Mr. Coffield went about his chores deftly, confidently, with clear and virile purpose. Saying little, he seemed to think a great deal: thought can be a scene-thief, it turns out."

Coffield was nominated for a Daytime Emmy Award in 1974 for Best Actor in Daytime Drama for his role in CBS Daytime 90: Legacy of Fear.

== Personal life ==
Coffield grew up in an Irish-Catholic household, the youngest of five children. Peter's eldest three siblings, Carolyn Coffield, Kitty (Katherine Amelia) Coffield, and James Coffield III, are from his father's first marriage. (Peter's father, James L. Coffield, was widowed in 1935; he married Peter's mother, Mary White, in 1939. They had two children together, Michael and Peter, and the children from both marriages lived as a single family. Coffield's father died in 1960; his mother died in 2001 in Tasmania, Australia, at the age of 94. Peter's brother Michael, an attorney in Chicago, died in 2007.

Coffield graduated from New Trier High School in 1963 and from Northwestern University in Evanston, Illinois in 1967, where he earned a B.S. in Oral Interpretation. He also earned a master's degree from the University of Michigan.

Coffield's longtime life partner was James Tripp, also an actor, who is the Head of Acting at the Stella Adler Conservatory in New York. Relationship confirmed in James Tripp obituary at StellaAdler.com.

Coffield died of an AIDS-related illness on November 19, 1983.

== Filmography ==
Film
Year	Title	Role	Notes
1977	Enigma	Peter McCauley	
1980	Times Square	David Pearl	
1981	Only When I Laugh	Mr. Tarloff	

Television
Year	Title	Role	Notes
1973	The Man Without a Country	Lt. Vinson	TV movie
1973	Cry Rape	Andy Coleman	TV movie
1974	CBS Daytime 90	Peter	Guest star, episode: "Legacy of Fear"
1974	The Chinese Prime Minister	Oliver	TV movie
1974	Medical Center	Roger Patman	Guest star, episodes: "The Bribe" and "Trial by Knife"
1975	The Rookies	Paul Stocker	Guest star, episode: "Solomon's Dilemma"
1975	Adams of Eagle Lake	Jimmy Simpkins	Recurring role, 2 episodes
1974–1976	Wide World of Mystery	Chet / Jerry Gerard	Guest star, episodes: "Terror in the Night", "Too Easy to Kill", and "Death Is a Bad Trip"
1975	Beacon Hill	Larry Greene	Guest star, episodes: "The Pretenders" and "The Test"
1977	Barnaby Jones	Tom Landry	Guest star, episode: "A Simple Case of Terror"
1977	Family	Brian Slater	Guest star, episode: "Best Friends"
1977	Eight Is Enough	Chuck	Guest star, episode: "Hit and Run"
1977	Washington: Behind Closed Doors	Eli McGinn	TV miniseries
1978	Tartuffe	Cleante	TV movie
1978	W.E.B.	Kevin	Recurring role, 5 episodes
1978	The Love Boat	Wayne	Guest star, episode: "Till Death Do Us Part, Maybe/Chubs/Locked Away"
1980	Hart to Hart	Sanford Whitley	Guest star, episode: "Sixth Sense"
1981	Nurse	Dr. Benson	Guest star, episodes: "Life Begins at Dinner" and "The Gifts"
1981	Senior Trip	Jerry	TV movie
1982	Love, Sidney	Eddie	Guest star, episode: "Father's Day"
1983	O'Malley	Guy Fleming	TV pilot

Theatre
Year	Title	Role	Notes
Mar 3, 1969 – Apr 26, 1969	Rosencrantz	Lorenzo	Revival, Play, Tragedy
Mar 10, 1971 – Apr 24, 1971	Abelard and Heloise	Robert de Montboissier	Original, Play, Drama
Jan 20, 1972 – Apr 29, 1972	Vivat! Vivat Regina!	Lord Darnley	Original, Play
Mar 1, 1973 – Apr 7, 1973	The Merchant of Venice	Lorenzo	Revival, Play, Comedy
Sep 25, 1977 – Nov 20, 1977	Tartuffe	Cléante	Revival, Play, Comedy, Farce
Jun 26, 1980 – Sep 7, 1980	The Man Who Came to Dinner	Bert Jefferson	Revival, Play, Comedy
