= Titanic Requiem =

Titanic Requiem is a musical work by Robin Gibb and Robin-John Gibb, first performed in April 2012, a month before the death of Robin Gibb senior. The work was conceived as a commemoration of the sinking of the Titanic on 15 April 1912.

== Première ==
The première was given by the Royal Philharmonic Orchestra and RSVP Voices under Cliff Masterson, at Central Hall, Westminster, on 10 April 2012, in a concert programme that also included a selection of music played on the maiden and only voyage of RMS Titanic. The soloists included Aled Jones and Isabel Suckling. Robin Gibb, who should have performed the solo "Don't Cry Alone", was too ill to attend the concert, and a recording of the track was played instead, while the new composition was introduced in person by Robin-John.

== Initial reception ==
One reviewer said of the New York Suite, "this musical voyage never left home waters". The same reviewer stated that: "Things picked up with the Requiem itself, which was performed with terrific focus under the baton of the music's orchestrator, Cliff Masterson. Robin Gibb's claim that the music could have been written 300 years ago turned out to be the literal truth, in parts. In the “Maiden Voyage” section there was a scrupulous correctness about the part-writing that would have merited a tick from a 19th-century Leipzig professor. Coupled with a distinctly English tone (born of distant memories of folk music mingled with a kind of Jacobean courtliness), it made for something sweetly earnest", and that: “the best things were the stern, minatory numbers, such as the “Confutatis”, which had a sudden turn to major-key radiance that Mendelssohn might have penned.”

The première was criticised for organisational problems which led to some concert-goers being admitted late. Guest conductor Alan Chircop, who was in charge of the orchestra during the first half, was criticised, and the orchestra itself was said to be over-amplified. Jones's singing was called "unsure". The use of the classical requiem format was said to be misguided by Musical Source; however, the Telegraph reviewer differed, stating that the idea for the piece, written to mark the 100th anniversary of the Titanic's sinking, was an ingenious one: compose a suite of mixed vocal and orchestral pieces that would trace the doomed ship's maiden voyage, interweaving this with settings of the Latin Mass for the Dead.

== Recording ==
The album (released on 26 March 2012) was generally well received by critics, with the Independent stating: "RJ Gibb is the motivating force behind The Titanic Requiem, including the decision to base it on the Latin Mass – though his father comes into his own singing "Don't Cry Alone", as from a drowning husband to his wife. The "New York Suite in C Major" is a pleasing evocation of hope, ambition and freedom, and "Sub Astris (Under the Stars)" ingeniously reflects the class divisions on board by contrasting elegant strings and aristocratic horns with the more déclassé xylophone tapping the folksier steps of rougher-hewn footwear..", and Time magazine saying: "As is appropriate for an album commemorating a tragedy, the music is hauntingly beautiful" Mario Frangoulis takes the place of Aled Jones as a soloist in the recording. Gibb himself said that the piece was "rooted in the kind of timeless music that ... shows how relevant music is to the human spirit."

== Tracks ==
- Triumph (Shipbuilding)
- Farewell (The immigrant song)
- Maiden Voyage
- New York Suite in C major
- Sub Astris (Under the stars)
- Kyrie
- SOS (Tract)
- Distress (Confutatis)
- Salvation (Gradual)
- Reflections
- Daybreak (Mario Frangoulis vocal solo)
- Christmas Day
- Libera Me
- Don't cry alone (a Robin Gibb vocal solo which was co-written, along with Robin Gibb and RJ Gibb, by Peter John Vettese)
- In Paradisum (Awakening)
