= Another Lonely Night in New York =

Single by Robin Gibb

from the album How Old Are You?
- Released: August 1983 (UK)
- Recorded: October–November 1982; Middle Ear Studios, Miami Beach
- Length: 4:14
- Label: Polydor
- Songwriter(s): Robin Gibb, Maurice Gibb
- Producer(s): Robin Gibb, Maurice Gibb, Dennis Bryon

Robin Gibb singles chronology
"Juliet" (1983)	"Another Lonely Night in New York" (1983)	"How Old Are You" (1983)

"Another Lonely Night in New York" is a song by British singer-songwriter Robin Gibb, released in 1983 as the second single from his second solo album How Old Are You?. The song managed to chart in several countries in Europe, reaching the top 20 in Germany and Switzerland, peaking at numbers 16 and 19, respectively. It was not released in the United States as a single.

It was recorded around October to November 1982. The song's intro bears only minimal resemblance to Foreigner's 1981 hit "Waiting for a Girl Like You", before indulging in its own, time-space specific melodic structure in full force.

The song was re-recorded for Gibb's 2003 album Magnet.

== Charts ==
Chart (1983)	Peak position
Belgium (Ultratop Flanders)	36
Germany (Media Control Charts)	16
Switzerland (Schweizer Hitparade)	19
UK Singles (Official Charts Company)	71
