= Help Me! =

Single by Marcy Levy and Robin Gibb

from the album Times Square: The Original Motion Picture Soundtrack
- Released: September 1980
- Length: 3:26
- Label: RSO
- Songwriters: Robin Gibb, Blue Weaver
- Producers: Robin Gibb, Blue Weaver

Marcy Levy singles chronology
| "Help Me!" (1980) | "Close to Her" (1982) |

Robin Gibb singles chronology
| "Oh! Darling" (1978) | "Help Me!" (1980) | "Juliet" (1983) |

Professional ratings
Review scores
| Source | Rating |
|---|---|
| Billboard | (unrated) |

"Help Me!" is a song by Marcy Levy (better known now as Marcella Detroit) and Robin Gibb. The song was recorded for the official soundtrack of Times Square, and released as the album's lead single, going on to peak at #50 on the Billboard Top 100. It was also considered as Levy's first single and her only song that was charted in the United States.

== Background ==
After working on Jimmy Ruffin's Sunrise (including the track "Where Do I Go", a duet by Ruffin and Marcy Levy) Robin Gibb and Bee Gees keyboardist Blue Weaver work together again by supplying tracks for the soundtrack of the film Times Square (an RSO movie). And the result was the song "Help Me!" sung by Levy and Gibb. The song was heard in the film's closing credits.

Related session outtake, "Touch Me", a song also written by Gibb and Weaver with lead vocals provided by Levy as a demo for Linda Clifford, but was not recorded by Clifford herself. Weaver says he and Levy didn't like its sexually charged lyrics and Gibb had to talk Levy into singing it. The B-side of the single, an instrumental version of "Help Me!" on which they made two instrumental versions of the same track, one with Gary Brown playing a sax solo.

It was released September 1980 and peaked at #50 in the Billboard Hot 100, #65 in Cashbox and #64 in Record World.

== Charts ==
| Chart (1980) | Peak position |
|---|---|
| US Billboard Hot 100 | 50 |
| US Cash Box | 65 |
| US Record World | 64 |

== Personnel ==
Adapted from the Times Square Soundtrack album booklet:

- Robin Gibb — lead and harmony vocal
- Marcy Levy — lead and harmony vocal
- Blue Weaver — keyboards, synthesizer
- Gary Brown — saxophone
- Uncredited — guitar
- Uncredited — bass
- Uncredited — drums
- Uncredited — handclaps
