= Walls Have Eyes =

Studio album by Robin Gibb
- Released: November 1985
- Recorded: August – September 1985
- Studio: Criteria Studios and Middle Ear Studios (Miami, Florida)
- Genre: New wave; synth-pop
- Language: English
- Label: EMI America (US); Polydor (UK)
- Producer: Maurice Gibb; Tom Dowd

Robin Gibb chronology
Secret Agent (1984)	Walls Have Eyes (1985)	Magnet (2003)

Singles from Walls Have Eyes
- 1. "Like a Fool" Released: November 1985; 2. "Toys" Released: February 1986

Walls Have Eyes is the fourth solo album by British singer Robin Gibb. It was released in November 1985 on EMI America Records in the US and Polydor Records throughout the rest of the world, and was produced by Maurice Gibb and Tom Dowd. The two singles from the album, "Like a Fool" and "Toys", did not chart in the US or UK. Gibb did not release another solo album for eighteen years until 2003 with Magnet. Unlike Secret Agent which contains dance numbers, this album contains mostly ballads.

== Background and recording ==
Barry Gibb co-wrote eight of the ten songs and contributed a part lead vocal to "Toys". The credits for the songs are precisely stated as R. B. & M. Gibb in most cases, and B. R. & M. Gibb in others. Although the songs all have Robin's signature simplicity of form, Barry's hand is evident in the improved melody lines, especially in the verses.

Like Robin's prior album, Secret Agent, Walls Have Eyes was recorded in Criteria Studios rather than the Middle Ear Studio, which was owned by the Bee Gees. The only regulars from previous Gibb recordings were George Terry on guitar with Steve Farris of Mr. Mister. Session musician Phil Chen was credited as the bass player on the song "Gone with the Wind".

The album was produced by Atlantic Records engineer and producer Tom Dowd. The copyright registrations on the songs span only between 28 August to 16 September 1985, and a period of just a few weeks keys in with what Dowd recalled a tight budget. On the sessions, there was one outtake, "Modern Girls"; Gibb later said that this "did not fit".

== Release ==
The album, as well as the lead single "Like a Fool", failed to chart in the US and UK. However, "Like a Fool" was a hit in Brazil and the single "Toys" did reach No. 27 on the Canada Adult Contemporary chart. Promo videos were also made for "Like a Fool" and "Toys". Walls Have Eyes is rare on compact disc giving its distinction as the last solo album recorded by any of the Gibb brothers issued on vinyl until Barry's In the Now in 2016. Polydor copies of the album which were converted onto CD were found, but because of low sales, it was not later reissued on CD internationally. Barry later stated that Robin did not receive the feedback he wanted and it was a rough period for all of the Gibb brothers.

A remixed version of "Toys" is included on the 1990 box set Tales from the Brothers Gibb.

== Track listing ==
All songs written by Robin, Barry, and Maurice Gibb, except where noted.

Side one
No.	Title	Length
1.	"You Don't Say Us Anymore" (Robin Gibb, Maurice Gibb)	4:05
2.	"Like a Fool"	3:58
3.	"Heartbeat in Exile"	4:13
4.	"Remedy"	3:26
5.	"Toys"	5:03

Side two
No.	Title	Length
1.	"Someone to Believe In"	3:31
2.	"Gone with the Wind" (Robin Gibb, Maurice Gibb)	3:35
3.	"These Walls Have Eyes"	4:20
4.	"Possession"	3:07
5.	"Do You Love Her?"	3:13

== Personnel ==
- Robin Gibb – lead vocals, backing vocals
- Maurice Gibb – keyboards, bass (1–6, 8–10), backing vocals
- Mitchell Froom – keyboards
- Duane Hitchings – keyboards
- Scott Glasel – MIDI programming, sampling
- Steve Farris – guitars
- George Terry – guitars
- Phil Chen – bass (7)
- Sandy Gennaro – drums
- Ed Calle – horns
- Alto Reed – horns
- Barry Gibb – lead vocals (5)

=== Production ===
- Tom Dowd – producer
- Maurice Gibb – producer
- Dennis Hetzendorfer – recording
- Leslie Shapiro – recording assistant
- Bill Schnee – mixing at Studio 55 (Los Angeles, California)
- Glen Holguin – mix assistant
- John Moran – digital editing at Digital Services (Houston, Texas)
- Doug Sax – mastering at The Mastering Lab (Hollywood, California)
- Dick Ashby, Eddie Choran, Ken Graydon, Tom Kennedy, Neal Kent, Bob Koske and Ivy Skoff – project coordination
- Maximilian S.W. Kirsten – art direction
- The Cream Group – design
- Tim O'Sullivan – photography
