= Sing Slowly Sisters =

- Bootleg edition of the album

Studio album by Robin Gibb
- Released: May 29, 2015
- Recorded: January–February and April 1970; London, England
- Genre: Pop, baroque pop
- Producer: Robin Gibb, Vic Lewis

Robin Gibb chronology
50 St. Catherine's Drive (2014)	Sing Slowly Sisters (2015)

Sing Slowly Sisters was to have been Robin Gibb's second studio album. Recorded in 1970, the album was finally released in 2015. The album was produced by Gibb and his manager Vic Lewis.

== Information ==
Sing Slowly Sisters was recorded from March 7 to June 23, 1970, and later in July in London. Sing Slowly Sisters began in March just after 1969's "Stairway To Dreamland" was released. On the November 1969 sessions, the songs "I've Been Hurt", "Cold Be My Days" and "Irons in the Fire" were recorded without a rhythm section, with just Gibb's vocals and an orchestra arranged by Kenny Clayton. The song "Avalanche" was later reworked for the 50 St. Catherine's Drive sessions and released in 2014 ((OH Gibb)). Related session outtake, "Great Caesar's Ghost" was declared by Gibb as his next single but was not released, and the song was received by Atlantic Records, although only one copy. While the title track, "Sing Slowly Sisters" was also declared as the next single.

The song "Cold Be My Days" was written about the place Shipston-on-Stour, Warwickshire; to wit "Cold be my days in Shipston-on-Stour". He stated in a BBC Radio 4 interview in May 2007 that this relates to his youthful experiences, riding horses with his brother Barry.

The album was released as part of the posthumous boxed set Saved by the Bell: The Collected Works of Robin Gibb 1968–1970 (2015).

== Aftermath ==
The bootleg Sing Slowly Sisters (Europe) included songs recorded during the session but not included on the final line-up of the album; "The Flag I Flew", "Return to Austria" and "Engines, Aeroplanes". Another bootleg of the album called The Complete Sing Slowly Sisters (Hong Kong) features unreleased songs from 1969's Robin's Reign sessions; "Janice" and "You're Going Away". And another bootleg copy of Sing Slowly Sisters includes mono versions of "One Million Years" and "Weekend".

AllMusic critic Richie Unterberger describes "Very Special Day" and "Iron in the Fire" as "eerie beauty", and "Janice" with "You're Going Away" as a shaky church-like organ. According to critic Dave Furgess "C'Lest La Vie, Au Revoir" is a killer song.

== Track listing ==
This may be the original song order for Gibb's second album.

All tracks are written by Robin Gibb.

Side one
No.	Title	Length
1.	"Life"	2:27
2.	"I've Been Hurt"	4:26
3.	"Irons in the Fire"	4:08
4.	"Cold Be My Days"	6:16
5.	"Avalanche"	4:12

Side two
No.	Title	Length
6.	"Make Believe"	5:05
7.	"All's Well That Ends Well"	2:13
8.	"Very Special Day"	2:58
9.	"Sky West and Crooked"	2:32
10.	"Sing Slowly Sisters"	4:00
11.	"C'est la vie, au revoir"	3:17

== Personnel ==
- Robin Gibb – vocals, guitar, piano, organ, producer
- Kenny Clayton – orchestral arrangement
- Vic Lewis – producer

== Saved by the Bell: The Collected Works of Robin Gibb: 1968-1970 ==
In 2015, Sing Slowly Sisters and an expanded and reissued version of Robin's Reign were included as part of the posthumous boxed set Saved by the Bell: The Collected Works of Robin Gibb 1968–1970 (2015).

=== Track listing ===
All tracks are written by Robin Gibb.

Disc one: Robin's Reign Plus...Bonus Material
No.	Title	Length
1.	"August October" (Stereo mix)	2:31
2.	"Gone Gone Gone" (Stereo mix)	2:35
3.	"The Worst Girl in This Town" (Stereo mix)	4:30
4.	"Give Me a Smile" (Stereo mix)	3:05
5.	"Down Came the Sun" (Stereo mix)	2:47
6.	"Mother and Jack" (Stereo mix)	4:06
7.	"Saved by the Bell" (Stereo mix)	3:06
8.	"Weekend" (Stereo mix)	2:10
9.	"Farmer Ferdinand Hudson" (Stereo mix)	3:05
10.	"Lord Bless All" (Stereo mix)	3:15
11.	"Most of My Life" (Stereo mix)	5:12
12.	"One Million Years" (Stereo mix)	4:10
13.	"Hudson's Fallen Wind" (Stereo mix)	12:18
14.	"Saved by the Bell" (Mono mix)	3:24
15.	"Mother and Jack" (Mono mix)	4:29
16.	"One Million Years" (Mono mix)	4:09
17.	"Weekend" (Mono mix)	2:12
18.	"August October" (Mono mix)	2:26
19.	"Give Me A Smile" (Mono mix)	3:08
20.	"Lord Bless All" (Alternate take; Stereo mix)	3:17

Disc two: Sing Slowly Sisters Sessions
No.	Title	Length
1.	"Sing Slowly Sisters"	3:54
2.	"Life"	2:13
3.	"C'est La Vie, Au Revoir"	3:17
4.	"Everything Is How You See Me"	2:33
5.	"I've Been Hurt"	4:19
6.	"Sky West and Crooked"	2:29
7.	"Irons in the Fire"	4:07
8.	"Cold Be My Days"	6:13
9.	"Avalanche"	4:11
10.	"Engines Aeroplanes"	2:24
11.	"The Flag I Flew"	4:15
12.	"Return to Austria"	2:17
13.	"It's Only Make Believe"	5:01
14.	"All's Well That Ends Well"	2:10
15.	"A Very Special Day"	2:56
16.	"Great Caesar's Ghost"	3:26
17.	"Anywhere I Hang My Hat"	3:41
18.	"Loud and Clear"	3:35
19.	"Return to Austria" (Demo)	8:00
20.	"Why Not Cry Together" (Demo)	2:09

Disc three: Robin's Rarities
No.	Title	Length
1.	"Alexandria Good Time"	3:14
2.	"Janice"	5:36
3.	"Love Just Goes"	5:05
4.	"August October ("Agosto Ottobre")"	2:34
5.	"One Million Years ("Un Milione De Ani")"	4:10
6.	"Saved by the Bell" (BBC)	2:52
7.	"Robin Talks To Brian Matthew (Interview)" (BBC; interview with Brian Matthew)	1:38
8.	"August October" (BBC)	2:21
9.	"Weekend" (BBC)	2:05
10.	"Give Me A Smile" (BBC)	3:29
11.	"Robin Talks With David Wigg" (BBC; interview with David Wigg)	1:51
12.	"The Band Will Meet Mr. Justice" (Demo)	2:46
13.	"The People's Public Poke Song" (Demo)	1:49
14.	"Indian Gin And Whiskey Dry" (Demo)	1:53
15.	"The Girl To Share Each Day" (Demo)	2:13
16.	"Come Some Halloween Or Christmas Day" (Demo)	3:42
17.	"Heaven In My Hands" (Demo)	2:11
18.	"Most Of My Life" (Demo)	3:51
19.	"Goodbye Good World" (Demo)	3:08
20.	"Down Came The Sun" (Demo)	2:47
21.	"Don't Go Away" (Demo)	5:10
22.	"Moon Anthem" (performed by the "Robin Gibb Orchestra & Chorus")	5:23
23.	"Ghost of Christmas Past" (performed by the "Robin Gibb Orchestra & Chorus")	7:43
