= Eliza S. Craven Green =

English poet, writer, and actress (1803–1866)

Eliza S. Craven Green (10 December 1803 – 11 March 1866) was an English poet, writer, and actress.

== Biography ==
Eliza Craven was born in Kirkgate, Leeds, on 10 December 1803. In her youth she spent some time in Douglas, Isle of Man, at the New Theatre on Athol Street as an actor. Subsequently, she lived at Manchester, but she returned to Leeds, where she resided for many years. She married James Green in 1828, at which point she began to publish her poetry not as "Eliza Craven", but as "Eliza Craven Green".

Her first book was 'A Legend of Mona, a Tale, in two Cantos,' Douglas 1825, 8vo, and her second and last, 'Sea Weeds and Heath Flowers, or Memories of Mona,' Douglas, 1858, 8vo. She was a frequent contributor of poetry and prose sketches to the periodical press. She wrote for the 'Phœnix,' 1828, and the 'Falcon,' 1831, both Manchester magazines; for the 'Oddfellows' Magazine, 1841 and later; for the 'Leeds Intelligencer', 'Le Follet', 'Hogg's Instructor', and 'Chambers's Journal'. She was a member of the Sun Inn Group, and contributed to its only published anthology, The Festive Wreath, in 1842.

Today she is perhaps best known for having written the poem, Ellan Vannin, in 1854, and is often referred to as the "alternative national anthem" for the Isle of Man. A few years before her death she received a gift from the queen's privy purse.

She died in Leeds on 11 March 1866 and is buried at St Mark's Cemetery, Woodhouse.
