= Times Square (1980 film) =

1980 film by Allan Moyle

- Theatrical release poster
- Directed by: Allan Moyle
- Screenplay by: Jacob Brackman
- Story by: Allan Moyle; Leanne Ungar
- Produced by: Jacob Brackman; Robert Stigwood
- Starring: Tim Curry; Trini Alvarado; Robin Johnson; Peter Coffield; Herbert Berghof; David Margulies; Anna Maria Horsford
- Cinematography: James A. Contner
- Edited by: Tom Priestley
- Music by: Various Artists
- Production companies: EMI Films; Robert Stigwood Organisation
- Distributed by: Associated Film Distribution
- Release date: October 17, 1980
- Running time: 111 minutes
- Country: United States
- Language: English
- Budget: $5 million
- Box office: $1.4 million

Times Square is a 1980 American drama film directed by Allan Moyle and starring Trini Alvarado and Robin Johnson as teenage runaways from opposite sides of the tracks and Tim Curry as a radio DJ. The film is set in New York City. The plot embodies a punk rock ethic of misunderstood youth articulating their frustrations toward adult authority through music.

== Plot ==
Teenagers Nicky Marotta and Pamela Pearl meet in the New York Neurological Hospital for "behavioral evaluation." Depressed and insecure, Pamela is neglected and exploited by her wealthy father David, a prominent commissioner running a campaign to "clean up" Times Square. On the other hand, brash Nicky is a tough-talking street kid with musical aspirations, sent for evaluation as her social worker Rosie's last-ditch attempt to keep her out of juvie after an altercation. After being released, Nicky slips away from Rosie and breaks Pamela out of the hospital. The girls escape in a stolen ambulance and hide out in an abandoned warehouse on the Chelsea Piers, eking out a living through street games, petty theft, odd jobs, scavenging and even dancing in a club.

A citywide search for Pamela erupts when her father reports her missing, claims she needs medical attention and accuses Nicky of kidnapping her. When WJAD radio DJ Johnny LaGuardia realizes that David's missing daughter is the same "Zombie Girl" who sent him letters about feeling alone, he reaches out to the girls on the air, telling them that he's seen their medical files and that there's nothing wrong with either of them. Confident and coming out of her shell, Pamela writes back to Johnny, telling him she is not kidnapped, but "me-napped."

The girls form an underground punk rock band named The Sleez Sisters, gaining fame through Johnny's broadcasts even as he uses their story to undermine Pamela's father. David's PR team gets Rosie to publish an open letter to Pamela that calls Nicky troubled and dangerous, and says she's wanted for manslaughter. In response, Nicky confesses to Pamela that her friend OD'd, and that she is afraid everyone will leave her behind. Angry at David, the girls perform an explicit and defiant song on WJAD accusing him of being a hypocrite, racist and homophobe. Not long after, David storms the studio and threatens Johnny's assistant into revealing Pamela's whereabouts, confronting her at the club where she refuses to go home. After that, the girls begin escalating their rebellion by throwing TVs off of rooftops, egged on by Johnny on the air.

Eventually, the girls have a falling out. Pamela is happy with who she's become and worried that people will get hurt by the TVs, while Nicky wants to get even more famous and hijack WJAD to play a concert. Resenting Pamela's admiration of Johnny, Nicky invites him to the warehouse for an exclusive interview, but goes out and gets wasted before he shows up. Jealous at the sound of Pamela and Johnny laughing, she accuses him of exploiting them and throws them both out of the warehouse.

Afterwards, Nicky breaks down completely, wrecking their home and burning their shared poetry journal. After a suicide attempt, she drunkenly breaks into WJAD, demanding that Johnny put her on the air. He pretends to comply, and midway through her song, she breaks down and shouts out to Pamela for help before being escorted out of the studio. A sympathetic Johnny finds Pamela in the warehouse the next day and reunites her with a heavily medicated Nicky. Angered by Nicky's state, Pamela blames Johnny and takes Nicky to her father's office in the middle of Times Square. There, she calls all the local radio stations, pretending to be Nicky and announcing an impromptu and illegal midnight show on the rooftop of a grindhouse on 42nd Street. She also invites all their fans to attend the concert: "If they treat you like garbage, wrap your body in a garbage bag. If they treat you like a criminal, black out your eyes!"

Girls across the city heed the call, converging in Times Square and mixing surprisingly well with the locals as Johnny watches on approvingly via telescope and Rosie smiles from street level. Even Pamela's father shows up. Before the show, the girls reconcile. Pamela admits she wants to go to college, and Nicky admits she's afraid she'll mess up the concert. But when the fans chant for her to go for it, she does. Clad in her own garbage-bag costume and bandit-mask makeup, Nicky sings on the marquee roof above a crowd of cheering fans. As the police close in around her, she bids Pamela an emotional farewell and jumps off the marquee, landing in a blanket held taut by a group of fans. Pamela, Johnny and Rosie watch, smiling, as Nicky evades capture and vanishes into the night, camouflaged by all of their fans.

== Cast ==
- Tim Curry as Johnny LaGuardia
- Trini Alvarado as Pamela Pearl
- Robin Johnson as Nicky Marotta
- Peter Coffield as David Pearl
- Herbert Berghof as Dr. Huber
- David Margulies as Dr. Zymansky
- Anna Maria Horsford as Rosie Washington
- Michael Margotta as JoJo
- J.C. Quinn as Simon
- Tim Choate as Eastman
- Elizabeth Peña as Disco Hostess
- Steve James as Dude
- Jay Acovone as Plainclothes Cop

== Production ==
=== Development ===
Times Square was directed by Allan Moyle from a script written by Jacob Brackman, based on a story by Moyle and Leanne Ungar. The movie was inspired by a diary, found in a second-hand couch bought by Moyle, detailing the life on the streets of a young mentally disturbed woman. "This girl was burning the candle at both ends," said Moyle. "She would go into bars - she was too young - but she would go in anyway and get arrested. She had no intention of reaching the age of 21."

According to the DVD commentary, the original title of the project was "She's Got the Shakes." Moyle wrote a script that attracted the interest of Tim Curry. Moyle then arranged for Jacob Brackman to do a rewrite. The script caught the attention of Robert Stigwood, the impresario behind the musical films Saturday Night Fever (1977), Grease (1978), and Sgt. Pepper's Lonely Hearts Club Band (1978). Moyle said, "I think they had been planning to shoot something this summer that fell through, and I was hysterical about wanting it to be shot, so we made a deal with them. They were very sensitive to the script."

Finance came in part from EMI Films.

=== Casting ===
Although Tim Curry has a supporting role in Times Square (and filmed all his scenes in two days), his familiarity with film audiences ensured that he received top-billing onscreen and in the film's advertising above the two unknown leads, 15-year-old Robin Johnson and 12-year-old Trini Alvarado. Robin Johnson's casting was a bit of a fluke. According to Johnson, she was cutting class – cutting up – and had been approached by a supposed talent scout, claiming she should audition for the film. She had never seen or heard from this man after the one meeting and no one from the film crew knew of him.

=== Filming ===
The film went into production with a $6 million budget. Filming started in New York in October 1979. It was meant to be the first of four Stigwood films shot in New York, the others being The Fan, Angel and Staying Alive.

=== Post-production ===
The original cut of Times Square contained lesbian content which was mostly deleted from the final print (which is still a lesbian love story). Moyle revealed in the DVD audio commentary that the film's integrity was compromised by the removal of the more overt lesbian content, and the addition of several "inappropriate" songs to the film's soundtrack at the insistence of producer Robert Stigwood, who wanted the film to be another Saturday Night Fever and insisted that the soundtrack be a double album to make the film more commercially viable.

Allan Moyle and Robin Johnson remarked on the audio commentary that the loss of key scenes made the narrative disjointed, and damaged the story's emotion and characterizations. They also note that the film's focus changes, jarringly, from Pamela to Nicky, and that the increasingly outlandish and unrealistic story undermines the movie's gritty, on-location documentary style.

Moyle left production before the film was completed, and other people supervised scenes to accompany the soundtrack additions (for example, the sequence featuring teens preparing to go to the Sleez Sisters' final concert was shot by the film's second unit).

The version of the film released to theatres was not Moyle's preferred cut; however, he still acknowledges the finished film's importance as it documents a Times Square that mostly no longer exists: the film was shot on location and captured Times Square's seedy, grindhouse atmosphere before it was cleaned up in the mid-1990s.

== Release ==
The film was advertised with the taglines "In the heart of Times Square, a poor girl becomes famous, a rich girl becomes courageous, and both become friends" and "TIMES SQUARE is the music of the streets."

== Reaction ==
Upon its original theatrical release, Times Square was not a commercial or critical success. Roger Ebert wrote, "Times Square rarely comes together into anything more than a good idea that fails, but there are times when it seems on the brink of wonderful things. Of all the bad movies I've seen recently, this is the one that projects the real sense of a missed opportunity - of potential achievement gone wrong. The problem may be with the screenplay. This is a movie that knows who its characters are, but doesn't seem sure about what they're doing."

Other reviews of the film were generally negative, but Robin Johnson's performance was frequently singled out for praise. Johnson, in fact, signed an exclusive three-year contract with the Robert Stigwood Organization, with the understanding that RSO would develop film and music projects for her. RSO intended to market Johnson as "the female John Travolta," and her contract legally barred her from accepting offers or auditions from rival companies. Johnson therefore turned down calls from agents, producers and casting directors, but the projects RSO promised her never came to fruition. Johnson took a job as a bank teller whilst waiting for her RSO contract to expire, and by the time it did, there were no offers for work. Johnson did some minor film and TV roles, but by the late 1980s, she gave up on acting and got a job as a traffic reporter on a Los Angeles radio station.

Allan Moyle later said he "had a rotten time" on the film, adding "And I just figured I wasn't combative enough to be a director." Moyle did not direct again until Pump Up the Volume in 1990.

=== Cult reputation ===
Over the years since its original release, Times Square has been rediscovered and become a staple at gay and lesbian film festivals, because of the aforementioned, subtly-portrayed lesbian relationship between the film's two female leads. Kathleen Hanna of Bikini Kill and Le Tigre cites this as one of her favorite films.

Welsh rock group Manic Street Preachers covered the Times Square song "Damn Dog" on their debut album Generation Terrorists (1992) and quoted dialogue from the film in the album liner notes ("Damn Dog" was, however, excluded from the American release of the album). A live version of the Manics performing "Damn Dog" is included in Generation Terrorists: 20th Anniversary Edition (2012).

The Manics titled their song "Roses in the Hospital" (from their second album, 1993's Gold Against the Soul) after Pamela's line "What about the roses in the hospital?" (alluding to the scene in which Nicky eats roses to distract Pamela from the doctors and her father). In concerts and publicity shots in 1993, Manics bassist Nicky Wire often wore bankrobber-mask-style makeup as Nicky Marotta does in the film.

On the review aggregator website Rotten Tomatoes, 50% of 16 critics' reviews are positive, with an average rating of 6/10.

== Home video ==
The movie was released on DVD by Anchor Bay Entertainment in 2000. Extra features on this DVD include audio commentary by director/co-writer Allan Moyle and star Robin Johnson, and the film's original theatrical trailer. Allan Moyle has stated that a director's cut of Times Square is unlikely to surface because the footage needed for its restoration is missing. Kino Lorber released the film on Blu-ray in May 2022 from a 4k remaster.

== Soundtrack ==
Times Square: The Original Motion Picture Soundtrack

Soundtrack album by Various Artists
- Released: September 8, 1980
- Recorded: 1980; Criteria Studios, Miami
- Genres: Punk rock; new wave
- Length: 66:18
- Label: RSO Records
- Producer: Bill Oakes

Singles from Times Square: The Original Motion Picture Soundtrack
- 1. "Help Me!" Released: September 1980

Professional ratings
Review scores
Source	Rating
AllMusic	3/5 stars

The film's release was accompanied by a double album soundtrack of punk rock and new wave music. The soundtrack comprises pre-existing songs as well as original songs commissioned for the film, and features a wide range of artists, including the Ramones, the Cure, XTC, Lou Reed, Gary Numan, Talking Heads, Garland Jeffreys, Joe Jackson, Suzi Quatro, Roxy Music, Patti Smith and the Pretenders.

The Suzi Quatro track "Rock Hard" is identified in the film as being Nicky and Pamela's favorite record. The song "Help Me!", which plays over the film's closing scene, is a duet between Robin Gibb (of the Bee Gees) and Marcy Levy (later to join the duo Shakespear's Sister). The song "Down in the Park" is credited as being performed by Gary Numan, but technically it was recorded when Numan was using the band name Tubeway Army. The version of "Down in the Park" included on the Times Square soundtrack is not the album/single version from Replicas (1979), but an earlier version of the song later released on Numan's Replicas Redux (2008).

The soundtrack features original songs sung by the film's actors: "Damn Dog" by Johnson, "Your Daughter Is One" by Johnson and Alvarado, and "Flowers of the City" by Johnson and David Johansen. The song "Dangerous Type" by the Cars features in the film, but was not included on the soundtrack.

As a compilation of some of the more important new wave and punk music from the era, the soundtrack achieved far more notoriety than the film did on its release. It became a collector's item among fans of XTC because it included the specially written XTC track "Take This Town", which was released as a single with its B-side track "Babylon's Burning" by the Ruts and for many years was only available on this soundtrack.

In his audio commentary for the DVD, Allan Moyle mentions that David Bowie was commissioned to provide a song for the movie's soundtrack, but Bowie's label at that time wouldn't let the filmmakers use it. (At the time, Bowie was still under contract with RCA Victor Records, and the Times Square album was issued by RSO Records, at the time distributed by RCA Victor competitor PolyGram; however, it's notable that Lou Reed, who does appear on the album, was also under contract to RCA Victor.) Desmond Child has mentioned in a magazine interview that he collaborated with David Bowie on the song "The Night Was Not" (the song did appear on the soundtrack, performed by Desmond Child & Rouge). Another rumor is that Bowie intended to provide a re-recorded version of his 1971 song "Life on Mars?" for the soundtrack. Although no such re-recording has been substantiated, much less released, Bowie did perform a rearranged version of "Life on Mars?" when he guested on The Tonight Show starring Johnny Carson on September 5, 1980 (a month before the release of Times Square).

=== Track listing ===
All songs produced 1980 except as noted.

Side one
No.	Title	Writer(s)	Producer(s)	Length
1.	"Rock Hard" (Suzi Quatro, from Rock Hard; later released on What Goes Around)	Mike Chapman, Nicky Chinn	Mike Chapman	3:18
2.	"Talk of the Town" (The Pretenders, from Extended Play; later released on Pretenders II)	Chrissie Hynde	Chris Thomas	3:16
3.	"Same Old Scene" (Roxy Music, from Flesh and Blood)	Bryan Ferry	Roxy Music and Rhett Davies	3:54
4.	"Down in the Park" (Gary Numan, 1979^{a})	Gary Numan	Gary Numan	4:20
5.	"Help Me!" (Robin Gibb and Marcy Levy; original)	Robin Gibb, Blue Weaver	Robin Gibb and Blue Weaver	3:37

^a This is an early version; later released on Replicas Redux. Although the Times Square film and soundtrack list the song as being performed by Gary Numan, it was actually recorded when Numan performed under the band name Tubeway Army.

Side two
No.	Title	Writer(s)	Producer(s)	Length
1.	"Life During Wartime" (Talking Heads; the version different from the one featured on the band's 1979 album Fear of Music)	David Byrne, Jerry Harrison, Tina Weymouth, Chris Frantz	Brian Eno and Talking Heads	3:40
2.	"Pretty Boys" (Joe Jackson, from Beat Crazy)	Joe Jackson	Joe Jackson	3:27
3.	"Take This Town" (XTC; later released on Rag and Bone Buffet)	Andy Partridge	Steve Lillywhite	4:08
4.	"I Wanna Be Sedated" (Ramones, from Road to Ruin (1978))	Joey Ramone	Tommy Erdelyi and Ed Stasium	2:29
5.	"Damn Dog" (Robin Johnson; original)	Billy Mernit, Jacob Brackman	Bill Oakes	2:40

Side three
No.	Title	Writer(s)	Producer(s)	Length
1.	"Your Daughter Is One" (Robin Johnson and Trini Alvarado; original)	Billy Mernit, Norman Ross, Jacob Brackman	Bill Oakes	2:10
2.	"Babylon's Burning" (The Ruts, from 1979 single "Babylon's Burning"; later released on, among others, No Thanks! The '70s Punk Rebellion)	John Jennings, Dave Ruffy, Malcolm Owen, Paul Fox	Mick Glossop	2:34
3.	"You Can't Hurry Love" (D.L. Byron; original)	Edward Holland, Jr., Lamont Dozier, Brian Holland	Jimmy Iovine	3:04
4.	"Walk on the Wild Side" (Lou Reed, from Transformer (1972))	Lou Reed	David Bowie and Mick Ronson	4:12
5.	"The Night Was Not" (Desmond Child and Rouge, from Runners in the Night (1979))	Desmond Child	Richard Landis and Desmond Child	3:08

Side four
No.	Title	Writer(s)	Producer(s)	Length
1.	"Innocent, Not Guilty" (Garland Jeffreys; original)	Garland Jeffreys	Garland Jeffreys and Bill Oakes	2:13
2.	"Grinding Halt" (The Cure, from Boys Don't Cry)	Robert Smith, Michael Dempsey, Lol Tolhurst	Chris Parry	2:49
3.	"Pissing in the River" (Patti Smith Group, from Radio Ethiopia (1976))	Patti Smith, Ivan Kral	Jack Douglas	4:41
4.	"Flowers in the City" (David Johansen and Robin Johnson; original)	David Johansen, Ronnie Guy	David Johansen	3:58
5.	"Damn Dog (Reprise – The Cleo Club)" (Robin Johnson; original)	Billy Mernot, Jacob Brackman	Bill Oakes	2:40

=== Charts ===
Chart (1981)	Peak position
Australia (Kent Music Report)	56
USA (Billboard Top LPs)	37
