= Ellan Vannin (poem) =

1854 Manx poem by Eliza Craven Green

Ellan Vannin (the Manx-language name of the Isle of Man) is a poem and song, often referred to as "the alternative Manx national anthem", the words of which were written by Eliza Craven Green in 1854 and later set to music by someone called either J. Townsend or F. H. Townend (sources vary).

== English version of the poem ==
When the summer day is over
And its busy cares have flown,
I sit beneath the starlight
With a weary heart, alone,
Then rises like a vision,
Sparkling bright in nature's glee,
My own dear Ellan Vannin
With its green hills by the sea.

Then I hear the wavelets murmur
As they kiss the fairy shore,
Then beneath the em'rald waters
Sings the mermaid as of yore,
And the fair Isle shines with beauty
As in youth it dawned on me,
My own dear Ellan Vannin
With its green hills by the sea.

Then mem'ries sweet and tender
Come like music's plaintive flow,
Of the hearts in Ellan Vannin
That lov'd me long ago,
And I give with tears and blessings,
My own fondest thoughts to thee,
My own dear Ellan Vannin
With its green hills by the sea.

== Manx Gaelic (Gaelg) version ==
Tra ta'n laa souree ec jerrey
As imneaghyn lhie ersooyl
mish my hoie fo ny rollageyn,
slane my lomarcan as skee
Eisht ta girree gollrish ashlish,
Loandyr gial as dooghyssagh
she oo hene o Ellan Vannin,
Lesh croink glassey rish y cheayn.

Ta mee clashtyn tharmane tonnyn
Myr t'ad nish paagey yn traie;
As heese dowin fo'n ushtey geayney
Kiaulleeagh foast ta'n ven-varrey;
As ta'n Ellan soilshean aalin
Myr ve ayns my aegid hene;
My heer deyr, shenn Ellan Vannin
Lesh croink glassey rish y cheayn.

Nish ta smooinaght millish meiyghagh
Cheet myr kiaulleeaght gys my chree;
Jeh ny cree'ghyn va ayns Mannin
Foddey roie hug graih da mee;
Ta mee coyrt lesh jeir as bannaght
Nish my smooinaght share dhyt hene;
My heer deyr, shenn Ellan Vannin,
Lesh croink glassey rish y cheayn.

== The Bee Gees version ==
The Bee Gees recorded a version for Isle of Man charities. They also included the song in their world-tour as a show of pride in the place of their birth. It was recorded in 1997, and released and re-released as a single, 1998–1999.

== See also ==
- Isle of Man
- Music of the Isle of Man
