= Secret Agent (Robin Gibb album) =

Studio album by Robin Gibb
- Released: June 1984 (US); July 1984 (UK)
- Recorded: March – June 1984
- Studio: Criteria (Miami)
- Genre: Synth-pop; new wave; dance-pop; freestyle
- Label: Mirage/Atco/Atlantic Records (US); Polydor Records (UK)
- Producer: Robin Gibb; Maurice Gibb; Mark Liggett; Chris Barbosa

Robin Gibb chronology
How Old Are You? (1983)	Secret Agent (1984)	Walls Have Eyes (1985)

Singles from Secret Agent
- 1. "Boys Do Fall in Love" Released: May 1984; 2. "Secret Agent" Released: August 1984

Secret Agent is the third solo album by British singer Robin Gibb, released in 1984. The album enjoyed limited success, mostly in Europe and Australia. The lead single "Boys Do Fall in Love" made the Top 10 in Italy and South Africa.

== Background and recording ==
The album followed on from How Old Are You? the previous year, with Robin's twin brother Maurice again co-writing and playing keyboards. Two songs were written by all three Bee Gees, including oldest brother Barry. The album is heavily electronic, relying mostly on multi-layered keyboards with bass and drums played on synthesizers. Recording took place at Criteria Studios as Barry Gibb was occupying the Bee Gees' own Middle Ear studio at the time, recording his solo debut Now Voyager.

Robin and Maurice continued the Bee Gees tradition of "making it up" in the recording studio. Assistant engineer Richard Achor recalled the years when Robin and Maurice would come in with only ideas for songs. Robin wrote lyrics with Maurice, and sometimes they set up drum and synthesizer grooves first, in which a song would work out from that. Maurice played synthesizer and keyboard, but played relatively little on the finished tracks in favor of Rob Kilgore's expertise. Robin had long been interested in the electronic sound, and Maurice was a willing accomplice. The concept was to carry on the sound of the big freestyle hit by Shannon, her 1983 song "Let the Music Play", which is why Robin brought in the same producers, Mark Liggett and Chris Barbosa, and musicians Rob Kilgore and Jim Tunnell to work on the album.

Robin asked Barbosa and Liggett to produce this album. As Barbosa explained: "Robin really wanted a dance hit, he specifically wanted to avoid a Bee Gees sound-alike record." "The Gibb project was different for us in that way", Liggett added. "We're not usually working with mega budgets, and it's better that way. All the money comes out of your pockets anyway."

== Release ==
Secret Agent was released in the United States in June 1984 and in the UK in July 1984. "Boys Do Fall in Love" and the title track, "Secret Agent," were released as singles. "Boys Do Fall in Love" became a Top 40 hit in the United States, peaking at #37 on the Billboard Hot 100. Gibb said of the album, "I don't like songs of the past. I like to get ahead. These songs are very 1984, maybe even more futuristic." He further described the record as "very black and urban – it reflects street music."

== Reception ==
Bob Stanley said that Secret Agent dove deeply into "the worlds of Roland, Korg and Fairlight." He said the title track mixed Gibb's melancholy style with contemporary Latin freestyle production, and noted its mid-song "fight scene". "Robot" is a reggae song with a vocoder, while "In Your Diary" was another heavily electronic track. Cash Box called "In Your Diary" a "a pleasing piece which suffers slightly from its formula quality, but benefits strongly from the familiar strength of the Gibb’s reliable performance, production and styling."

== Track listing ==
All tracks are written by Robin and Maurice Gibb, except where noted.

Side one
No.	Title	Length
1.	"Boys Do Fall in Love"	3:50
2.	"In Your Diary" (Robin Gibb, Maurice Gibb, Barry Gibb)	3:41
3.	"Robot"	3:42
4.	"Rebecca"	3:51
5.	"Secret Agent"	4:58

Side two
No.	Title	Length
1.	"Living in Another World" (Robin Gibb, Maurice Gibb, Barry Gibb)	3:40
2.	"X-Ray Eyes"	3:53
3.	"King of Fools"	3:40
4.	"Diamonds"	3:57

== Personnel ==
- Robin Gibb – vocals, backing vocals
- Maurice Gibb – keyboards, synthesizers, backing vocals
- Robbie Kilgore – keyboards, synthesizers, guitars
- Jimi Tunnell – guitars, backing vocals
- Chris Barbosa – sequencers
- Lori Ellsworth – backing vocals
- Arlene Gold – backing vocals
- Cindy Mizelle – backing vocals
- Evan Rogers – backing vocals
- Audrey Wheeler – backing vocals
- Lari White – backing vocals

=== Production ===
- Chris Barbosa – producer
- Maurice Gibb – producer
- Robin Gibb – producer
- Mark Liggett – producer
- Dennis Hetzendorfer – engineer
- Richard Achor – assistant engineer
- Mike Fuller – mastering
- Dick Ashby – project coordinator
- Tom Kennedy – project coordinator
- Scott Sands – project coordinator
- Bob Defrin – artwork
- Richard Schmidt – artwork
- Mark Tucker – photography

== Chart positions ==
Chart (1984)	Peak position
Swiss Albums Chart	20
US Billboard Top Pop Albums	204
US Cashbox Top Albums	183
West German Media Control Albums Chart	31
