= Juliet (Robin Gibb song) =

Single by Robin Gibb

from the album How Old Are You?
- B-side: "Hearts on Fire"
- Released: May 1983 (UK); June 1983 (US)
- Recorded: October–November 1982 at Middle Ear, Miami Beach
- Genre: Synth-pop; new pop; new wave
- Length: 3:46
- Label: Polydor
- Songwriters: Robin Gibb, Maurice Gibb
- Producers: Robin Gibb, Maurice Gibb

Robin Gibb singles chronology
"Help Me!" (1980)	"Juliet" (1983)	"Another Lonely Night in New York" (1983)

"Juliet" is a 1983 single by Australian singer-songwriter Robin Gibb, from his second solo album How Old Are You?. The song was a huge hit in various countries in Europe, hitting the No. 1 spot in Germany, Italy, and Switzerland and peaking at No. 2 in Austria. In addition, the single was certified gold by the German Bundesverband Musikindustrie in 1983. A music video was also made for this song.

== Charts and certifications ==
=== Weekly charts ===
Chart (1983)	Peak Position
Australia (Kent Music Report)	70
Austria (Ö3 Austria Top 40)	2
Belgium (Ultratop 50 Flanders)	7
Denmark (Hitlisten)	1
Germany (GfK)	1
Italy (FIMI)	1
Netherlands (Single Top 100)	14
Netherlands (Dutch Top 40)	11
Portugal (AFP)	8
Spain (AFYVE)	5
Switzerland (Schweizer Hitparade)	1
UK Singles (Official Charts)	94
Uruguay (UPI)	3
US (Billboard Bubbling Under Hot 100)	104
Zimbabwe (ZIMA)	7

=== Year-end charts ===
Chart (1983)	Rank
Austria (Ö3 Austria Top 40)	6
Belgium (Ultratop 50 Flanders)	75
Germany (Official German Charts)	4
Italy (FIMI)	6
Switzerland (Schweizer Hitparade)	11

=== Certifications ===
Region	Certification	Certified units/sales
Germany (BVMI)	Gold	500,000^{^}
^{^} Shipments figures based on certification alone.
