= Robin Gibb =

British singer (1949–2012)

Robin Gibb CBE
- Gibb in 1973
- Born: Robin Hugh Gibb; 22 December 1949; Douglas, Isle of Man
- Died: 20 May 2012 (aged 62); London, England
- Burial place: St. Mary the Virgin Churchyard, Thame, Oxfordshire, England
- Occupations: Singer; musician; songwriter; record producer
- Years active: 1955–2012
- Spouses: Molly Hullis (m. 1968; div. 1982) Dwina Murphy (m. 1985)
- Children: 4, including Spencer
- Father: Hugh Gibb
- Relatives: Barry Gibb (brother); Maurice Gibb (twin brother); Andy Gibb (brother); Steve Gibb (nephew)
- Musical career
- Origin: Manchester, England
- Genres: Soul; rock; disco; pop; new wave
- Instrument: Vocals
- Labels: Leedon; Festival Spin; Polydor; Atco; RSO; Mirage; EMI America; SPV
- Formerly of: Bee Gees; The Rattlesnakes
- Website: robingibb.com

Robin Hugh Gibb (22 December 1949 – 20 May 2012) was a British singer and songwriter. He gained global fame as a member of the Bee Gees with elder brother Barry and twin brother Maurice. Robin Gibb also had his own successful solo career.

Gibb was born at the Jane Crookall Maternity Home, Douglas on the Isle of Man, to English parents, Hugh and Barbara Gibb; the family later moved to Manchester for three years (where Andy was born) before settling in Redcliffe, just north of Brisbane, Australia. Gibb began his career as part of the family trio (Barry-Maurice-Robin). When the group found their first success, they returned to England, where they achieved worldwide fame. In 2002, the Bee Gees were appointed as CBEs for their "contribution to music". However, investiture at Buckingham Palace was delayed until 2004.

With record sales estimated in excess of 200 million, the Bee Gees became one of the most successful pop groups of all time. Music historian Paul Gambaccini described Gibb as "one of the major figures in the history of British music" and "one of the best white soul voices ever" owing to his distinctive vibrato-laden soulful voice. From 2008 to 2011, Gibb was president of the UK-based Heritage Foundation, which honours figures in British culture. After a career touching six decades, Gibb last performed on stage in February 2012 supporting injured British servicemen at a charity concert at the London Palladium. After numerous health problems in his final years, including colorectal cancer, Gibb died in May 2012 at the age of 62 from liver and kidney failure.

While primarily known as a vocalist, Gibb also played a variety of keyboards, including piano, organ and Mellotron on various early Bee Gees albums such as Odessa (1969); he also played acoustic guitar and organ on his debut solo album Robin's Reign (1970).

== Childhood ==
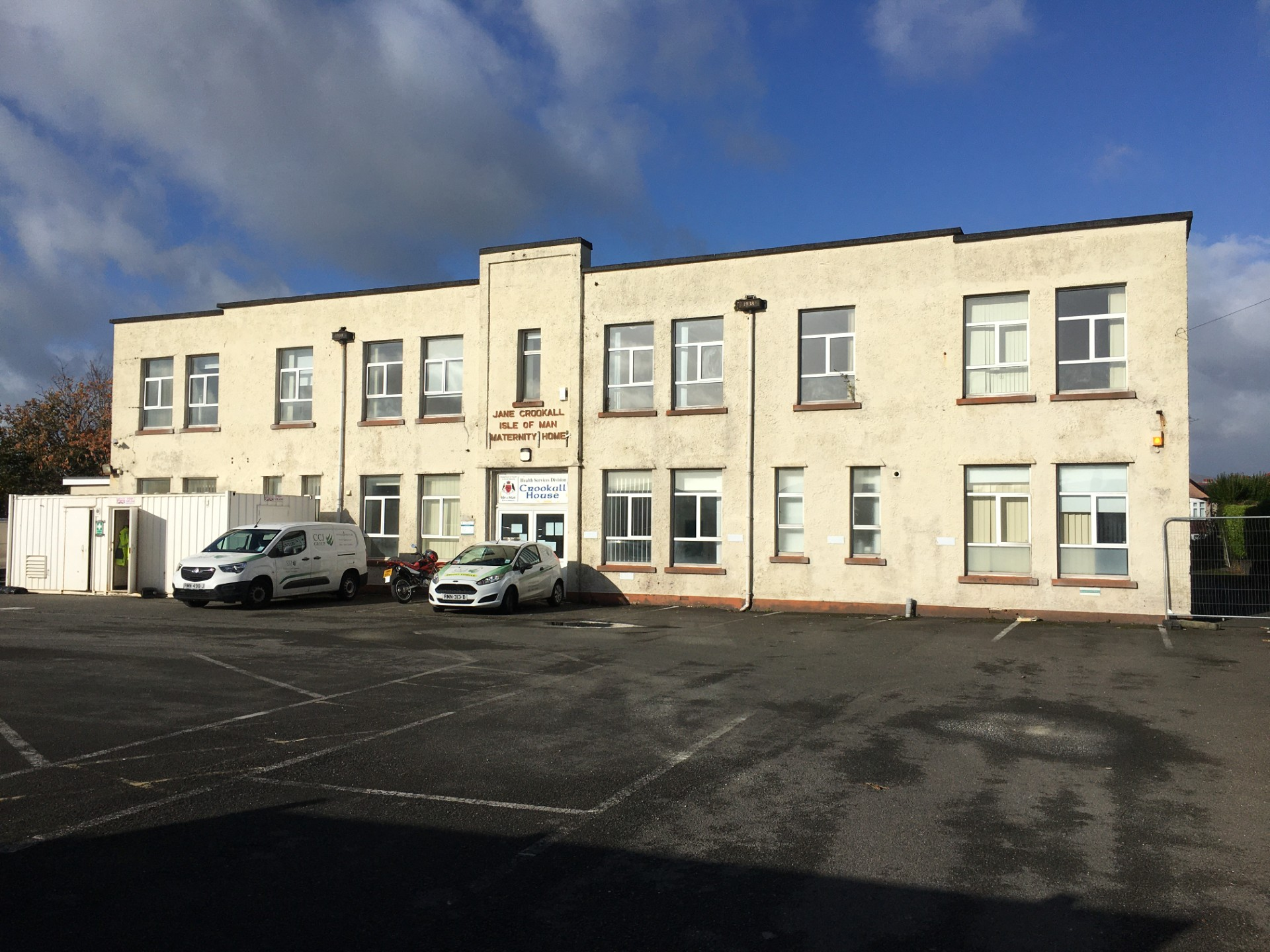
The Jane Crookall Maternity Home, Douglas Isle of Man, where Robin Gibb was born on 22 December 1949.

Robin Hugh Gibb was born on 22 December 1949 in Jane Crookall Maternity Home in Douglas, Isle of Man, to Barbara Gibb (née Pass) and Hugh Gibb, 35 minutes before his fraternal twin, Maurice Gibb. Apart from Maurice, he had one sister, Lesley Evans, and one additional brother, Barry. Another brother, Andy, would be born in 1958. As children in Manchester, Gibb and his brothers began committing crimes such as petty burglary and arson.

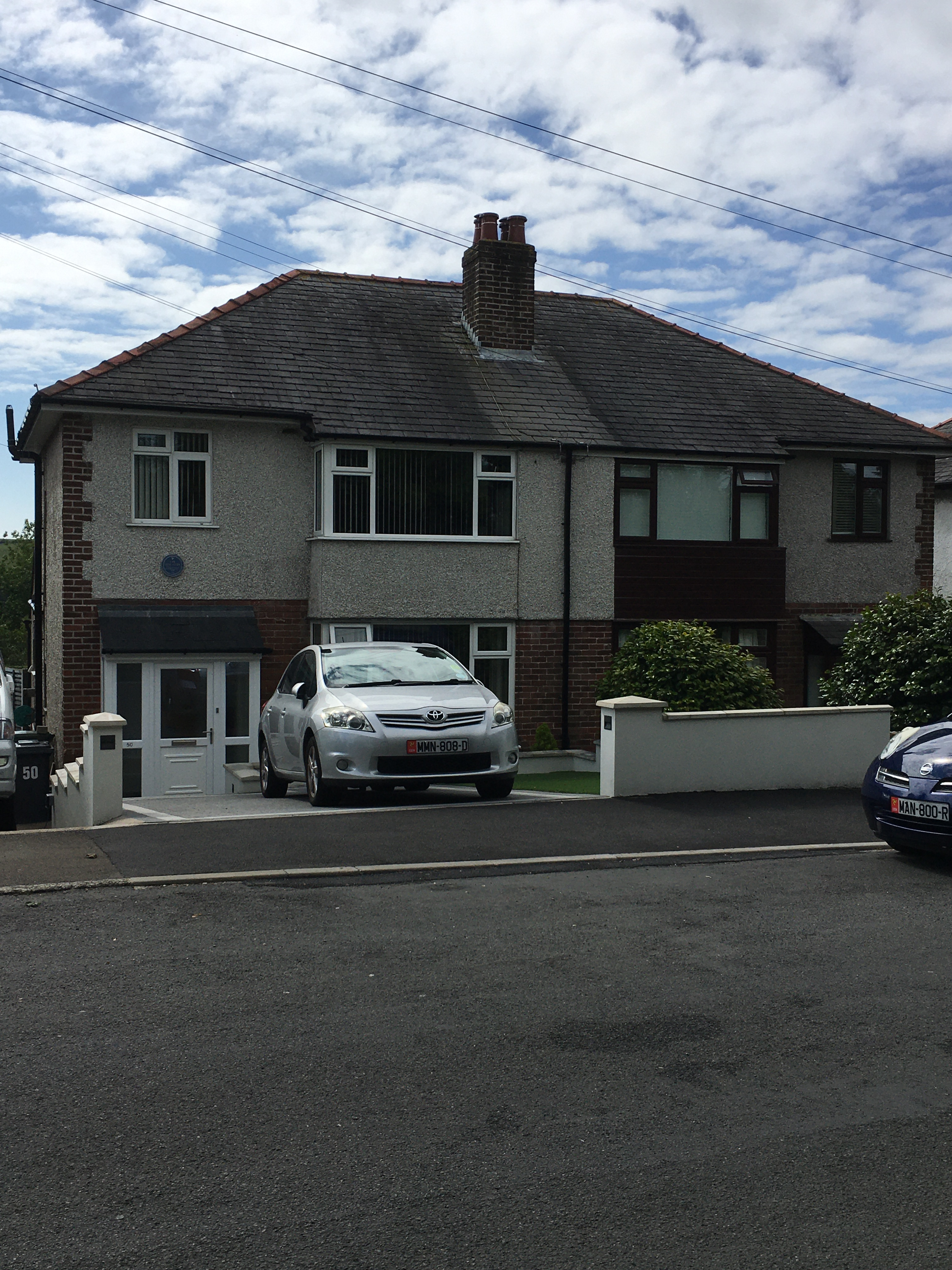
50 St Catherine's Drive, Douglas, the childhood home of the Bee Gees

Their neighbour in Willaston, Isle of Man, Marie Beck, was a friend of his mother and her sister Peggy. Helen Kenney, another neighbour, was living in Douglas Head. As Kenney recalls, "Barry and the twins used to come into Mrs Beck's house and we would talk to them. Robin once said to me, 'We're going to be rich one day, we're going to form a band!' Little did I realise he meant it."

== Career ==
=== 1955–1958: The Rattlesnakes ===
In 1955, when the Gibbs moved back to their hometown of Manchester, the brothers formed the Rattlesnakes. The band consisted of Barry on guitar and vocals, Robin and Maurice on vocals, Paul Frost on drums, and Kenny Horrocks on tea-chest bass. The quintet performed in local theatres in Manchester. Their influences at that time were popular acts, such as the Everly Brothers, Cliff Richard, and Paul Anka. In May 1958, the group was disbanded as Frost and Horrocks left, and the name changed to Wee Johnny Hayes and the Blue Cats. In August 1958, the family travelled to Australia on the same ship as Red Symons, who also became a prominent musician in Australia.

=== 1958–1969: Bee Gees ===
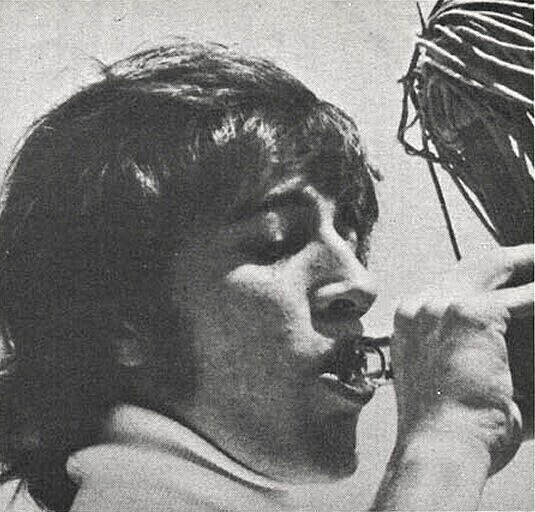
Gibb on 27 January 1968 issue of KRLA Beat

The boys finally changed their name to the Bee Gees, while they were living in Queensland, Australia. The Bee Gees' debut television appearance was in 1960 on Desmond Tester's Strictly for Moderns when they performed "Time Is Passing By". When they signed to Festival Records at the start of 1963 (but they were assigned to Leedon Records) they released their debut single, "The Battle of the Blue and the Grey". Their 1964 single "Claustrophobia" is notable for being the first song that features Gibb as an instrumentalist playing melodica. The first Bee Gees record on which he sang lead was "I Don't Think It's Funny" in 1965. In 1966, he wrote his first song "I Don't Know Why I Bother With Myself" that was credited to him. Also in 1966, Gibb and his brother Barry took more solo vocals.

"Robin is such a highly strung person, he was bound to snap eventually. We have just come back from holiday but he never moved out of his hotel room. He also went with Barry to Rome and Nairobi. But in both places, while Barry went sightseeing, Robin just stayed in his room writing songs. Robin seems totally unable to relax. He always has to be writing. Yet, instead of sitting back after his songs have been recorded, he immediately turns to new writing. So he gets tense and tired, with the result that he collapsed last week. We may be twins, but I'm not a bit like him."

— Maurice Gibb, press conference, 1968

The group's first period of British success in the late 1960s started with "New York Mining Disaster 1941" and the band added drummer Colin Petersen and guitarist Vince Melouney to their line up. They toured Europe in 1967 and 1968 as well as the US in August 1968. The band's first UK No. 1 was "Massachusetts", which features Gibb on lead vocal.

On 13 June 1968, Gibb recorded demos for seven songs, accompanying himself on guitar. The tape listed Robin alone as artist and songwriter. Of these, one – "Indian Gin and Whisky Dry" – later appeared on Idea. On 27 July 1968, Gibb collapsed and fell unconscious. He was later admitted to a London nursing home suffering from nervous exhaustion, and was moved to a facility in Sussex on 31 July to continue his recuperation. The group, about to embark on its first US tour, cancelled four dates after Gibb had a relapse and flew back to England for additional rest.

Gibb co-wrote "Only One Woman", The Marbles' debut single, which was a hit in several countries, especially in Europe and New Zealand. The Marbles were a British rock duo consisting of Graham Bonnet and Trevor Gordon. The Bee Gees' single "I Started a Joke," on which Robin sang lead, was not released as a single in the UK but was the group's first US Top 10 hit. Gibb claimed that the melody of the song was inspired by the sounds he heard in a jet engine.

In August, the band started to record Odessa. In January 1969, Gibb co-wrote another Marbles single, "The Walls Fell Down," and co-produced the sessions that same month. However, the rivalry with Barry eventually prompted Robin to leave the group and begin a solo career (three months after guitarist Vince Melouney left the band) after his song "Lamplight" was relegated to the B-side of Barry's song "First of May". Meanwhile, there were rumours during this period that he was dealing with drug problems, allegedly leading his parents to threaten legal action to make him a ward of court (the UK age of majority at that time being 21, while Gibb was only 19). The Bee Gees' last recording session with Robin was in February 1969. Gibb's last performance with the group was on The Tom Jones Show and Top of the Pops before leaving the group.

=== 1969–1970: Solo career ===
On 19 March 1969, he announced that he was leaving the Bee Gees the same day as the band recorded "Tomorrow Tomorrow", their first single without Robin. In his solo career, Gibb was initially successful with a number 2 UK hit, "Saved by the Bell", which sold over one million copies and received a gold disc. He performed that song on the German TV show Beat-Club. Also in 1969, Gibb co-produced "Love for Living". The song was performed by Clare Torry and was released as a single. He also started a mini-tour, making television appearances in a dozen countries to promote "Saved by the Bell". By 19 July 1969, New Musical Express announced "Tonight, [Robin Gibb] is fronting a 97-piece orchestra and a 60-piece choir in a recording of his latest composition, 'To Heaven and Back', which was inspired by the Apollo 11 moonshot. It is an entirely instrumental piece, with the choir being used for astral effects. The single will be billed as by 'The Robin Gibb Orchestra and Chorus' and it will be rush-released as soon as possible by Polydor". At that time, he was doing a musical score for Henry The Eighth and making his own film called Family Tree. Later, it was reported on NME that Gibb wrote dozens of songs for Tom Jones. A meeting between Gibb and Jones was said to be arranged for Gibb's return from a three-day promo trip to Germany.

On 31 January and 1 February 1970, Gibb performed in Auckland, New Zealand at Redwood 70, billed as the first modern music festival held in New Zealand. During the first night of the festival, Gibb and his 16-piece backing orchestra were pelted with cans and tomatoes from the crowd, making his backing band gradually leave during the performance. Robin's first solo album, Robin's Reign (1970) was less successful and he soon found that being a solo artist was unsatisfying. Maurice played bass on the song "Mother and Jack", but was subsequently removed from the project by producer Robert Stigwood. Also in that year, Colin Petersen produced "Make a Stranger Your Friend" performed by Jonathan Kelly, on which Gibb sang on the chorus with Mick Taylor, Klaus Voormann, Madeline Bell, three members of The Family Dogg, Jackie Lomax, Peter Sellers, Spike Milligan and others. By January 1970, Gibb started to record his second solo album Sing Slowly Sisters until February, but the album would go unreleased until 2015. He wanted "Great Caesar's Ghost" to be released as a single around 1970 with "Engines, Aeroplanes" as the B-side but the two songs were not included on that album and were unreleased to this day.

On 13 June, Gibb and Maurice reunited and they recorded four songs, with two of the four tracks released on their upcoming album 2 Years On. The session was originally for Maurice alone as he brought Gibb to the sessions. On 21 June sessions, the pair recorded another five songs.

=== 1970–1979: Bee Gees comeback ===
In August, the pair returned to the studio and they announced that the Bee Gees were back, with or without Barry's contribution. One of the fourteen songs, "Back Home" and "I'm Weeping" was also released on 2 Years On. On 21 August it was announced that Barry had rejoined the group and they were recording together. The first song after the announcement was "Lonely Days" which reached No. 3 in the US Billboard Hot 100. On the 2 Years On album, Gibb's songs included "Alone Again". He also co-wrote and sang lead vocals on the title track as well as "Man For All Seasons". In December 1970, Gibb recorded a demo "After the Laughter". The Bee Gees had their first US No. 1 single "How Can You Mend a Broken Heart", with Gibb contributing on the song, writing with Barry and singing lead vocals on its first verse.

In April 1972, two months after the departure of drummer Geoff Bridgford, he wrote his last solo composition on a Bee Gees record until 1999, "Never Been Alone". In 1976, on the group's Children of the World album, he sang lead on "Love Me" as well as doing falsetto on the track's coda, and he also used his falsetto on his lead vocal part on the song "Lovers" as Barry provided lead vocals on the entire song. On the Saturday Night Fever soundtrack, he did not sing lead vocals on any Bee Gees song, unlike their previous and next albums. Four tracks off the album reached the UK Top 10; "How Deep Is Your Love", "More Than A Woman", "Stayin' Alive", and "You Should Be Dancing". Moreover, "Night Fever" spent longer at #1 than any track in 1978.

In 1978, Gibb performed on the Sesame Street Fever album for the Sesame Street children's TV program. He was one of the singers on the "Sesame Street Fever" title track, he sang a song called "Trash" for the character Oscar the Grouch, and spoke with Cookie Monster at the beginning of "C is for Cookie".

=== 1980–1985: Collaborations with artists ===
In January 1980, Gibb co-wrote and co-produced Jimmy Ruffin's 1980 album Sunrise with Blue Weaver. Ruffin had enjoyed one of his first significant hits, "Hold on to My Love", from the album Sunrise, written and produced by Gibb and Weaver. "Hold on to My Love" had reached and stayed in the US Top 30 hits for 14 weeks. Also in 1980, he duetted with Marcy Levy on the song "Help Me!" (reached No. 50 in the US) featured on the soundtrack of the film Times Square. The other artists performing on the film, including Gary Numan, Roxy Music, Ramones, The Cure and The Cars. Also in 1980, most of Barbra Streisand's album Guilty was co-written by Gibb with Barry. In February 1981, the Bee Gees returned to the studio and recorded Living Eyes, unlike the previous album, this album was not as successful. Living Eyes was produced and published during a time when the Bee Gees were in litigation with their long-time manager Robert Stigwood, leaving them without the production and organization team they usually had behind them to promote their albums. They then worked on Dionne Warwick's album Heartbreaker and recorded songs for the film Staying Alive.

==== Initial solo success ====
He recorded his second solo album with Maurice's participation, How Old Are You?. The lead single "Juliet" was a success in Europe as well as "Another Lonely Night in New York" and the title track. In 1984, he released his third solo album Secret Agent, a new wave/synthpop-influenced LP (reached No. 97 in the US, No. 31 in Germany and No. 20 in Switzerland). The album's lead and first single "Boys Do Fall in Love" reached the Billboard magazine top 40 list of hits, as well as reaching No. 70 in the UK, No. 7 in South Africa and No. 10 in Italy. Other singles such as the title track and "In Your Diary" did not repeat the success of the first single. Due to the success of "Boys Do Fall in Love", he performed the song in several TV shows including Eldorado (Danish TV).

In 1985, he released his fourth solo album Walls Have Eyes with the singles "Like a Fool" and "Toys"; both songs did not chart in the US or UK. These three albums were more successful in Europe than in the UK or US. In 1986, Gibb joined Thompson Twins, Zak Starkey, Cliff Richard, Bonnie Tyler, John Parr and Holly Johnson under the name Anti-Heroin Project to record a charity single called "Live-In World".

=== 1986–2002 ===
In late 1986, the Bee Gees began writing and recording songs for their album ESP to be released in 1987. In 1992, Lulu recorded "Let Me Wake Up in Your Arms" on which he co-wrote. Gibb later contributed vocals on the Brazilian duo José y Durval's "Palavras/Palabras" (a Spanish or Portuguese version of "Words"). In 1998, the Bee Gees recorded their own version of "Ellan Vannin" with lead vocals by Gibb. It was later released as a single as a limited edition CD to benefit the Manx Children in Need charity. In 2001, the Bee Gees released their last album This Is Where I Came In and features his last composition on a Bee Gees record "Embrace".

=== 2003–2009: Touring years ===
On 27 January 2003, two weeks after the sudden death of Maurice, Robin released a solo album, Magnet in Germany on SPV GmbH, and worldwide shortly afterwards. Magnet featured the Bee Gees song "Wish You Were Here" (from the 1989 album One) in a new acoustic version. The lead single, "Please", had coincidental lyrics about 'loss'. In recent years, Gibb sang the vocals to the opening titles to the British ITV show The Dame Edna Treatment. In August 2003, Gibb announced the release of a new single of "My Lover's Prayer", a song first recorded by the Bee Gees in 1997 on the album Still Waters, with lead vocals by Gibb and singers Wanya Morris and Lance Bass. That version was played on the radio but was never actually released. In October 2003, Gibb recorded a second version of the song with Alistair Griffin, a-runner up in the UK television program Fame Academy on which Gibb appeared as a judge. In January 2004, the new version of that song was released in the UK as a double A side CD single. It eventually reached number 5 in the UK music charts. In late 2004, Gibb embarked a solo tour of Germany, Russia and Asia with singer Alistair Griffin as the opening act. On his return to the UK, Gibb released a CD and DVD of live recordings from the German leg of the tour, backed by the Frankfurt Neue Philharmonic Orchestra of Frankfurt, Germany. In 2005, Gibb made a solo tour of Latin America.

In January 2005, Gibb joined his brother Barry and several other artists under the name One World Project to record a charity single in aid of Asian tsunami relief, titled "Grief Never Grows Old". Other artists who performed on the single included Boy George, Steve Winwood, Jon Anderson, Rick Wakeman, Sir Cliff Richard, Bill Wyman, America, Kenney Jones, Chicago, Brian Wilson of The Beach Boys, Russell Watson and Davy Spillane. In June 2005, Gibb joined The X Factor runner up band G4 at a sell-out concert at the Royal Albert Hall in London, singing the Bee Gees song "First of May". In December 2005, a recordings of this performance was released as part of double A side single, credited as "G4 feat Robin Gibb" together with G4's cover version of the Johnny Mathis song "When a Child is Born". "First of May" also appeared on the platinum selling album G4 & Friends, which reached number 6 in the UK album charts. In the same year, Gibb presented master classes at Paul McCartney's Liverpool Institute for Performing Arts and oversaw the selection for release of thesis works by music graduates for the next two terms. On 20 February 2006, Gibb and Barry performed at a concert for Diabetes Research Institute of the University of Miami in Hollywood, Florida. This was their first joint performance since Maurice's death. In March 2006, Gibb announced plans for more solo concerts in Shanghai, China and Portugal.

In May 2006, Gibb took part in the Prince's Trust 30th birthday Concert at the Tower of London along with Barry. They sang three songs: "Jive Talkin'", "To Love Somebody" and "You Should Be Dancing". In September 2006, Gibb performs at the Miss World 2006 contest finals in Warsaw, Poland. In November 2006, Gibb released his sixth album My Favourite Christmas Carols the last album released in his lifetime, backed by The Serlo Concert, a London choir. This album featured a new song by Gibb called "Mother of Love", which was released in Europe as a download single. The song was inspired by Maurice and was Gibb's first new composition since Maurice died. Gibb donated all royalties from "Mother of Love" to the Janki Foundation for Global Healthcare, and dedicated the song to Dadi Janki, the organisation's spiritual leader. Gibb dedicated the album to his mother, Barbara. My Favourite Christmas Carols has a bonus DVD disc titled A Personal Christmas Moment with Robin Gibb. Also in November 2006, Gibb performed a solo concert, entitled 'Bee Gees – Greatest Hits' at the Araneta Coliseum (now Smart Araneta Coliseum) in Manila, Philippines. Gibb marked his return to his birthplace by playing a concert at the Isle of Man TT festival in 2007. Gibb donated all of his share of the money from this concert to the children's ward at Noble's Hospital, Isle of Man, and invited all emergency service staff and marshals for the TT to attend for free.

On 18 May 2008, Gibb released the song "Alan Freeman Days" in tribute to the Australian DJ Alan Freeman. The song was issued as a download only track, although a promotional CD was issued by Academy Recordings. In December 2008, "Alan Freeman Days" was followed by another downloadable song titled "Wing and a Prayer", which shared the same name as a song from the 1989 One album. However, the new song was actually a reworking of the song, "Sing Slowly Sisters", that had remained unreleased since 1970. Later in December, Gibb issued another song, "Ellan Vannin (Home Coming Mix)", featuring the King William's College Choir from the Isle of Man. ("Ellan Vannin" is the Manx name for the Isle of Man.) On 8 September 2007, Gibb performed at a concert in Salt Lake City, Utah at EnergySolutions Arena for the Nu Skin Enterprises Convention, singing a set of Bee Gees hits. On 25 October 2007, Gibb performed at the National Palace of Culture in Sofia, Bulgaria and sang the Bee Gees' most famous songs.

In 2008, Gibb completed a new solo album entitled 50 St. Catherine's Drive, but it was never released until 2014. The song "Instant Love" was a collaboration with Gibb's son, Robin-John both having written the music and vocals. "Instant Love" featuring Robin-John on lead vocals appeared in a short film called Bloodtype: The Search in which Robin-John appeared. On 25 October 2008, to mark the 30th anniversary of the song "Saturday Night Fever" topping the UK charts, Gibb performed with special guests including Ronan Keating, Stephen Gateley, Sam Sparro, Sharleen Spiteri, Gabriella Climi and Bryn Christopher at the London music festival BBC Electric Proms. Gibb went back to the top of the UK charts in 2009 when he collaborated with singers Ruth Jones, Rob Brydon and Tom Jones on a new version of "Islands in the Stream", written by Gibb and his brothers Barry and Maurice. The new version, inspired by the BBC comedy TV show Gavin & Stacey, was created to benefit the charity Comic Relief.

=== 2010–2012: Final years ===
In 2010, Gibb was also a guest mentor on the Australian version of The X Factor, alongside TV host Kyle Sandilands, actress/singer Natalie Imbruglia, and singers Ronan Keating and Guy Sebastian. Also in 2010, Gibb toured in Australia with Bonnie Tyler as his supporting guest. Together they performed at Melbourne, Sydney, Brisbane and Perth. In September 2011, Gibb recorded the Bee Gees classic "I've Gotta Get a Message to You" with British Army men The Soldiers for a charity single in the UK, it was produced with his son Robin John Gibb and the video for which was produced by Vintage TV. Gibb was the subject of an edition of the BBC genealogy documentary series Who Do You Think You Are? first broadcast on 21 September 2011. On 30 January 2012, Gibb announced his intention to appear onstage at the Coming Home Concert at the London Palladium in February to benefit British soldiers returning home from Afghanistan. It would be his last performance onstage. Over a period of two years, Gibb and Robin-John wrote the score for The Titanic Requiem, recorded by Royal Philharmonic Orchestra to commemorate the 100th anniversary of the sinking of the Titanic. Gibb was due to attend the piece's première on 10 April 2012 at the Central Hall, Westminster, London, but his failing health kept him away. He died the next month.

== Personal life ==
In 1968, Gibb married Molly Hullis, a secretary in Robert Stigwood's organisation. Not long before they were married they survived the Hither Green rail crash together. They had two children together, Spencer (b. 1972) and Melissa (b. 1974). The couple divorced in 1982 after years of living separate lives, with Gibb almost permanently in the US and Hullis remaining in the UK; she filed for divorce on 22 May 1980. The divorce became final in 1982. On 9 September 1983, Gibb was arrested and sentenced to 14 days in jail for speaking to the press about his previous marriage in breach of a court order.

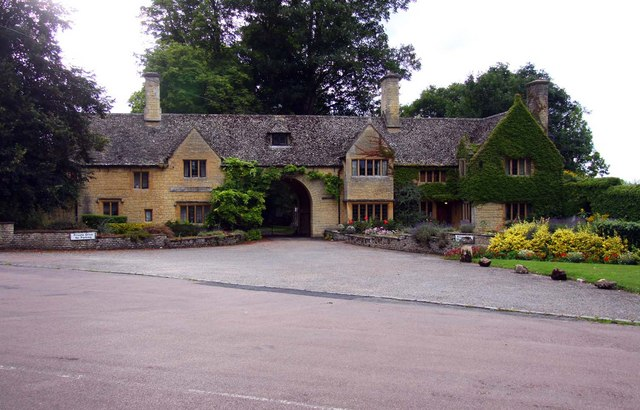
Gatehouse of the Prebendal, Gibb's house in Thame, Oxfordshire

Gibb's second marriage, from 1985 until his death, was to Dwina Murphy, an author and artist. She is interested in the Druidry religion. They had an open relationship. The couple had a son, Robin-John (known as RJ, b. 21 January 1983). Robin-John's first major musical project was the Titanic Requiem (2012), written with Gibb and first performed at the Central Hall, Westminster, London, on 10 April 2012, by the Royal Philharmonic Orchestra and RSVP Voices.

In 2001, Gibb began an affair with his 25-year-old housekeeper, Claire Yang, and in 2008, had his fourth child with her.

Gibb and his wife divided their time between their homes in Peel, Isle of Man, their mansion in Miami, Florida and their main residence in Thame, Oxfordshire.

On 10 March 1988, younger brother Andy died in Oxford, of myocarditis. On 12 January 2003, twin brother Maurice died in Miami Beach, Florida, of complications from a twisted intestine.

Politically, Gibb was a supporter of New Labour, the British Labour Party when Tony Blair was Prime Minister. He launched a rally in Huddersfield, West Yorkshire, ahead of the 2005 General Election. He was a close friend of Blair, who was criticised for staying at Gibb's Miami mansion during Christmas 2006. In 2008, Gibb publicly stated that he continued to get on "like a house on fire" with Blair and said that the then Labour prime minister, Gordon Brown, regularly listened to the Bee Gees. "He listens to our music every day. Gordon likes our music and I like Gordon", he told The Times. In a tribute upon his death, longtime friend Tony Blair said: "Robin was not only an exceptional and extraordinary musician and songwriter, he was a highly intelligent, interesting and committed human being. He was a great friend with a wonderful open and fertile mind and a student of history and politics."

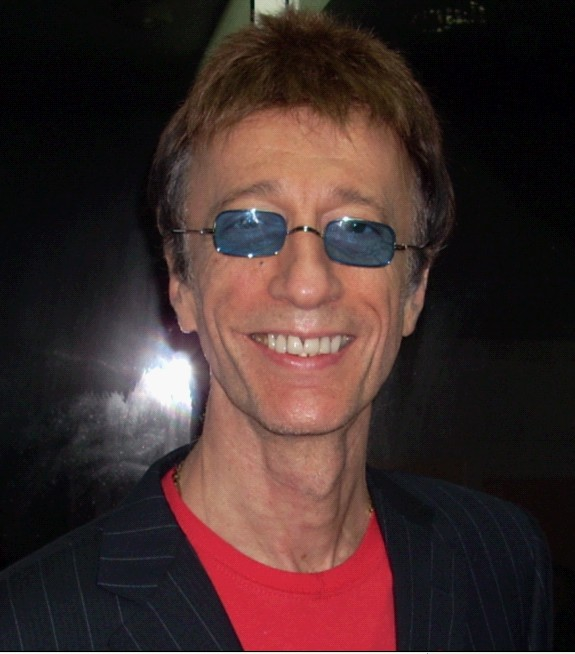
Gibb in 2008

Gibb worked on behalf of several charities. He was the organiser of the Sunseeker Ball in aid of the Outward Bound Trust. For the International Confederation of Societies of Authors and Composers (CISAC), Gibb served as president from 2007 to 2012. He was also the longest serving president (2008–2011) of the Heritage Foundation, which honours figures of British culture and facilitated his campaign on behalf of the Bomber Command Memorial Appeal.

== Health problems and death ==
On 14 August 2010, while performing in Belgium, Gibb began to feel abdominal pains. On 18 August 2010 at an Oxford hospital, he underwent emergency surgery. Gibb recovered and returned to perform concerts in New Zealand and Australia. In April 2011, he cancelled concerts in Brazil after the pain came back. During this time, Gibb was also involved in promoting fund-raising for the memorial dedicated to RAF Bomber Command in Green Park, London. Gibb also wrote The Titanic Requiem with his son Robin-John, which was recorded by the Royal Philharmonic Orchestra to commemorate the 100th anniversary in 2012 of the sinking of the Titanic. Gibb continued to make television appearances and other events following his surgery, but in April 2011 he was forced by health problems to cancel his tour of Brazil. Another concert in Paris was cancelled in October 2011. On 14 October, Gibb was due to perform the charity single with the Soldiers but was again rushed to hospital with severe abdominal pains. On 18 October, following his release from the hospital, Gibb appeared on ITV's The Alan Titchmarsh Show looking gaunt and frail.

On 27 October 2011, Gibb cancelled an appearance only minutes before he was due to perform at the Poppy Appeal Concert in London. In November 2011, he was diagnosed with liver cancer, which metastasised to his lower digestive system. In March 2012, Gibb was hospitalised for intestinal surgery and cancelled scheduled appearances while recovering. In April, however, he contracted pneumonia and fell into a coma, which he came out of later in April. He died in a London hospital on 20 May 2012, at the age of 62. While it was initially reported that he had died from cancer, Robin-John Gibb said that his father's cancer had gone into remission by the time of his death and the cause was kidney failure.

His funeral was held on 8 June 2012 and he was buried at the Church of St Mary the Virgin, near his home in Thame, Oxfordshire. In September of the same year, a blue plaque was placed on the house. In 2015, a headstone, engraved with some of the lyrics of his group's songs, including "How Deep Is Your Love", was placed.

=== Reactions ===
Robin and his brother Barry had famously clashed both personally and professionally for decades before his death, and that conflict lasted to the end. Nonetheless, Barry delivered a eulogy at his brother's funeral, saying: "Even right up to the end we found conflict with each other, which now means nothing. It just means nothing. If there's conflict in your lives – get rid of it."

At Robin's funeral, Barry talked about the connection between Robin and his twin brother, Maurice, saying: "They were both beautiful and now they're together." Barry added details about Robin's struggle losing his brother Maurice a decade earlier, saying: "I think the greatest pain for Robin in the past ten years was losing his twin brother, and I think it did all kinds of things to him."

The Who's Roger Daltrey recalled: "A lovely, lovely guy. I hear everyone talking about the success of their career but I haven't heard many talk about him as a singer and I used to think he was one of the best. To me, singing is about moving people and Robin's voice had something about it that could move me and, I'm sure, millions of others. It was almost like his heart was on the outside." John Travolta recalled, "I thought Robin was one of the most wonderful people, gifted, generous and a real friend to everyone he knew. And we'll miss him." Tim Rice described Gibb as "a charming man". Rice added: "I saw him only a couple of weeks ago. He wasn't at all well but was putting up a marvellous fight. It's a terrible loss for the music industry." Gibb's friend Cliff Richard said, "We are a fraternity of people who sing pop and rock and Robin is another one of us who's gone too soon, too early." Ringo Starr told the BBC: "Robin will be remembered as a musician and as a singer and part of the Bee Gees." Dionne Warwick said: "He was wonderful. He was a jokester. He had an incredibly witty sense of humour and was fun to be around."

Kenny Rogers recalled: "Robin was a part of something unique. Mostly, Robin was a good guy who didn't deserve to die this young. We will all miss him for what he was as a person and what he brought to music." Other artists paid tribute to Gibb, including Justin Timberlake (who played Robin in the Saturday Night Live skit "The Barry Gibb Talk Show"), Ronan Keating, Shane Filan of Westlife, Liam Gallagher, Hanson, David Draiman of Disturbed, Atmosphere, Paula Abdul, Jake Shears of the Scissor Sisters, Jermaine Dupri, Peter Frampton, Adam Hills, Peter Andre, Richard Marx, Taboo of the Black Eyed Peas, Justin Bieber, the Doors, Bruno Mars, Sam Sparro, Elton John, Jamey Jasta of Hatebreed, Duran Duran, the Script and Bryan Adams.

=== Final studio album ===
Gibb's final studio album, 50 St. Catherine's Drive, was released posthumously on 29 September 2014 in the UK and 30 September 2014 in the US. The album reached No. 70 in the UK and No. 39 in Germany. It features previously unreleased recordings from 2007 and 2008. The lead single, "Days of Wine and Roses", was premiered in the United States on 12 September. Reprise Records issued a new version of "I Am the World" from the album as a single in the UK. Gibb's first compilation album entitled, Saved by the Bell – The Collected Works of Robin Gibb: 1969–70 was released in May 2015 and contained Gibb's songs between 1969 and 1970 including demos of songs that were sung by the Bee Gees and the unreleased material from Sing Slowly Sisters.

== Acclaim and recognition ==
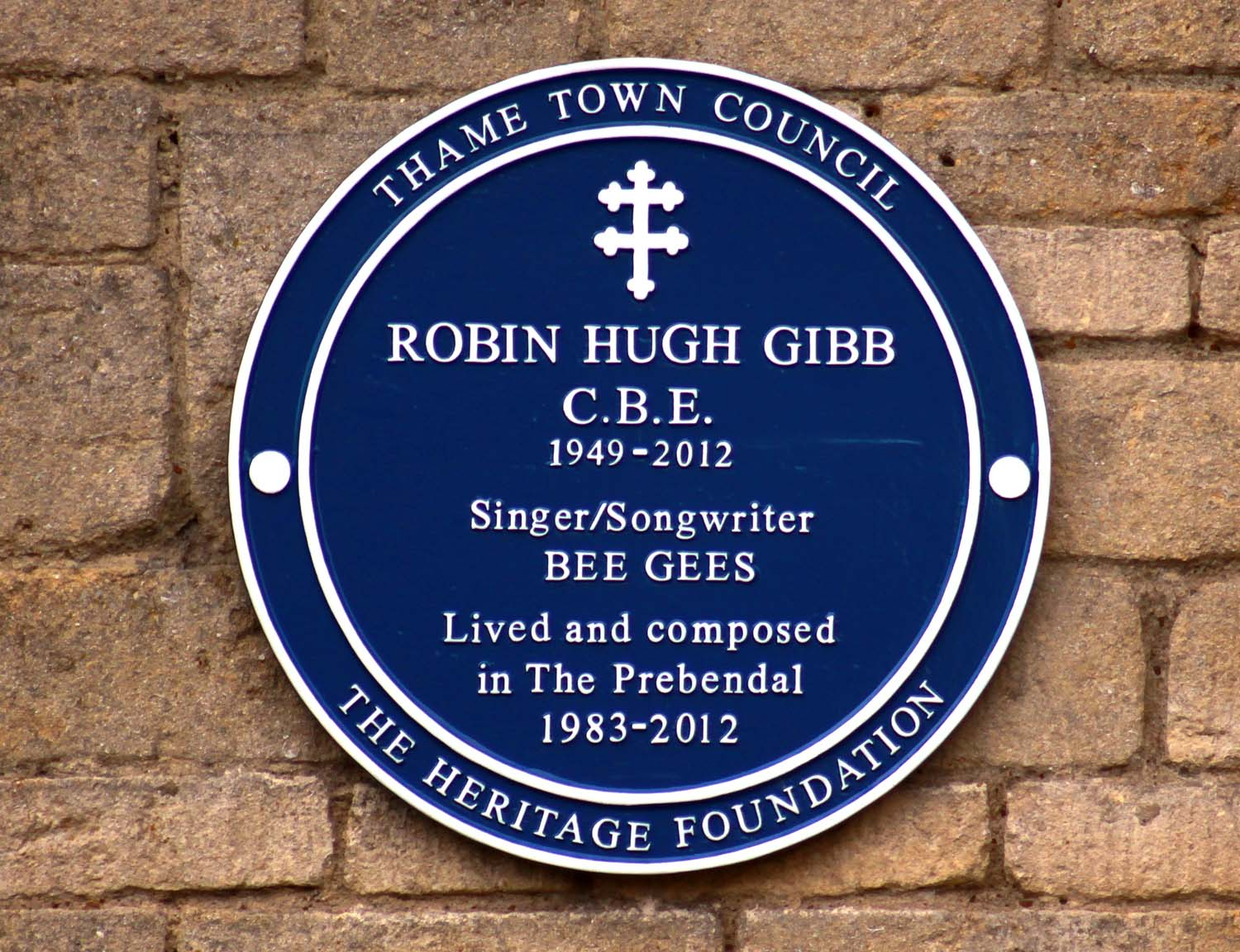
Blue plaque of the Heritage Foundation commemorating Gibb at his home (The Prebendal) in Thame, Oxfordshire

In 1994, Gibb was inducted into the Songwriters Hall of Fame at the Grammy Museum in Los Angeles. In 1997, he was inducted into the Rock and Roll Hall of Fame in Cleveland, Ohio, US, as a member of the Bee Gees. At the 1997 BRIT Awards held at the Earls Court Exhibition Centre in London on 24 February, the Bee Gees received the award for Outstanding Contribution to Music.

In the 2002 New Year Honours, Gibb was appointed as a Commander of the Order of the British Empire (CBE) along with his brothers Maurice and Barry. However, the official presentation ceremony at Buckingham Palace in London was delayed until 2004 due to Maurice's death.

In May 2004, Gibb and his brother Barry both received honorary doctorates of music from the University of Manchester, England. In 2005, Gibb received the Steiger Award (Miner Award) in Bochum, Germany for accomplishments in the arts. On 10 July 2009, both brothers were also made Freemen of the Borough of Douglas, Isle of Man. The award was also bestowed posthumously on Maurice, therefore confirming the freedom of the town of their birth to Gibb, Barry and Maurice.

The radio and television presenter Paul Gambaccini has stated that the Bee Gees were "second only to Lennon and McCartney as the most successful songwriting unit in British popular music", and recognised Gibb as "one of the major figures in the history of British music [and] one of the best white soul voices ever". Gibb was a fellow of the British Academy of Songwriters, Composers and Authors (BASCA).

=== Australian Songwriters Hall of Fame ===
The Australian Songwriters Hall of Fame was established in 2004 to honour the lifetime achievements of some of Australia's greatest songwriters.

Year	Nominee / work	Award	Result
2022	Barry Gibb, Maurice Gibb and Robin Gibb	Australian Songwriters Hall of Fame	inducted

== Discography ==
- Robin's Reign (1970)
- How Old Are You? (1983)
- Secret Agent (1984)
- Walls Have Eyes (1985)
- Magnet (2003)
- My Favourite Christmas Carols (2006)
- 50 St. Catherine's Drive (2014)
- Sing Slowly Sisters (2015)

== Filmography ==
List of acting performances in film and television
Year	Title	Role	Notes
1968	Frankie Howerd Meets the Bee Gees	Himself	TV series
1978	Sgt. Pepper's Lonely Hearts Club Band	Dave Henderson	film
2009	Who Wants to Be a Millionaire?	Himself (contestant)	TV game show
