= How Old Are You? (album) =

Studio album by Robin Gibb
- Released: May 1983 (UK); June 1983 (US)
- Recorded: October – November 1982
- Studios: Middle Ear Studios, Miami Beach
- Genres: New wave; synth-pop; pop rock; soft rock
- Label: Polydor
- Producers: Robin Gibb; Maurice Gibb; Dennis Bryon

Robin Gibb studio albums chronology
| Robin's Reign (1970) | How Old Are You? (1983) | Secret Agent (1984) |

Singles from How Old Are You?
- 1. "Juliet" Released: May 1983; 2. "Another Lonely Night in New York" Released: August 1983 (UK); 3. "How Old Are You?" Released: October 1983 (UK)

Professional ratings
Review scores
| Source | Rating |
|---|---|
| AllMusic | 3/5 stars |

How Old Are You? is the second solo album released by British singer Robin Gibb in 1983, thirteen years after his debut Robin's Reign in 1970. The album was not a great success in America and failed to chart in Britain but it did spawn an international hit in "Juliet" which topped the charts in Germany. The album reached No. 6 in Germany. The album was produced by Robin and Maurice Gibb with Dennis Bryon.

== Overview and recording ==
In 1982, Gibb with his brothers, Barry and Maurice wrote "Oceans and Rivers". In March, he recorded "My World (In the Palm of Your Hands)" and "Human Being". In October, the Bee Gees recorded "Life Goes On" for the film Staying Alive. "Human Being" was leaked on YouTube on 5 April 2012.

In October 1982, Robin started to record songs for How Old Are You? with Maurice on bass, synthesizer, piano and guitar. Bee Gees drummer Dennis Bryon participated on this album, playing electrónica drums, drum machine and producing the album. Bryon was credited as the backup vocalist. The horns were arranged by Peter Graves. Engineered by Samii Taylor and Dale Peterson. Other musicians included Bee Gees guitarist Alan Kendall on guitar, George Bitzer on piano and synthesizer. In his autobiography, Dennis Bryon says that keyboard player Blue Weaver (formerly with Bee Gees) was involved, but he isn't mentioned in the credits.

The Boneroo Horns members consisted of Peter Graves, Brett Murphey, Melton Mustafa, Russ Freeland, Neal Bonsanti, Dan Bonsanti and Whit Sidener. The recordings of this album got to the US copyright office on 16 December 1982. The instrumental tracks made heavy use of electronics. Maurice, as a producer, liked a clear sound with good separation. Dennis Bryon's drumming was electronic and was played by drumsticks and programmed in, accompanied by Maurice's bass and synthesizer. Robin sings all of the songs in high range but lower than Barry's falsetto, while the songs on his 1984 album Secret Agent were sung in low range. Related session outtake, "Love is Just a Calling Card" was credited to Robin and Maurice but was not released.

== Release ==
How Old Are You? and the lead single "Juliet" was released in North America on Polydor Records, but the LPs were manufactured in Germany. Polydor did not have a big presence in the United States, and Gibb thought that his album was not released in the US. The other singles "How Old Are You?" and "Another Lonely Night in New York" with "I Believe in Miracles" as the B-side of both two singles were not released as singles in the US. The cover of the album contains a poster photo of film actors Clark Gable and Ava Gardner.

Allmusic critic Joe Viglione described "Danger" as an elegant techno journey and "He Can't Love You" as a frosty march number. Viglione said "Kathy's Gone" has film references, and "I Believe in Miracles" could have been a big hit for both Dolly Parton and Linda Ronstadt.

== Track listing ==
All songs written by Robin and Maurice Gibb.

Side one
| No. | Title | Length |
|---|---|---|
| 1. | "Juliet" | 3:45 |
| 2. | "How Old Are You" | 3:09 |
| 3. | "In and Out of Love" | 3:52 |
| 4. | "Kathy's Gone" | 3:36 |
| 5. | "Don't Stop the Night" | 3:30 |

Side two
| No. | Title | Length |
|---|---|---|
| 1. | "Another Lonely Night in New York" | 4:12 |
| 2. | "Danger" | 3:41 |
| 3. | "He Can't Love You" | 4:06 |
| 4. | "Hearts on Fire" | 3:52 |
| 5. | "I Believe in Miracles" | 3:51 |

== Personnel ==
- Robin Gibb – lead vocals and backing vocals
- Maurice Gibb – acoustic guitar, electric guitar, piano, synthesizers, bass, rhythm arrangements, horn arrangements and backing vocals
- Alan Kendall – acoustic guitar and electric guitar
- George Bitzer – piano and synthesizers
- Dennis Bryon – electrónic drums, drum machine and backing vocals
- Boneroo Horns (Peter Graves, Ken Faulk, Brett Murphy, Melton Mustafa, Russ Freeland, Neal Bonsanti, Dan Bonsanti and Whit Sidener) – horns
- Peter Graves – horn arrangements

=== Production ===
- Maurice Gibb – producer
- Robin Gibb – producer
- Dennis Bryon – co-producer
- Samii Taylor – engineer
- Dale Peterson – technical supervisor
- Mike Fuller – mastering at Criteria Studios (Miami, Florida)
- Peter Graves – music coordinator
- Arthur Sheriff – UK coordinator
- Dick Ashby, Neal Kent and Tom Kennedy – project coordination
- Jimmy Wormser – photography
- The Cream Group – album design

== Charts ==
=== Weekly charts ===
| Chart (1983) | Peak position |
|---|---|
| Dutch Albums (Album Top 100) | 26 |
| German Albums (Offizielle Top 100) | 6 |
| Swiss Albums (Schweizer Hitparade) | 26 |

=== Year-end charts ===
| Chart (1983) | Position |
|---|---|
| German Albums (Offizielle Top 100) | 31 |
