= How Old Are You? (Robin Gibb song) =

1983 single by Robin Gibb

"How Old Are You"

Single by Robin Gibb

from the album How Old Are You?
- B-side: "I Believe in Miracles"
- Released: October 1983 (UK)
- Recorded: 1982
- Length: 3:09
- Label: Polydor
- Songwriter(s): Robin Gibb, Maurice Gibb
- Producer(s): Robin Gibb, Maurice Gibb Dennis Bryon

Robin Gibb singles chronology
"Another Lonely Night in New York" (1983)	"How Old Are You" (1983)	"Boys Do Fall in Love" (1984)

"How Old Are You" is a single released by Robin Gibb, the third and final single released from the album of the same name in October 1983. It reached #93 in the UK and #37 in Germany. "How Old Are You" likewise has the rhythm guitar beat, bang-away drumming, a powerful horn and synthesizer blend.

== Chart performance ==
Chart (1983)	Peak position
Germany (Media Control Charts)	37
UK Singles (Official Charts Company)	93
