= Little Boots discography =

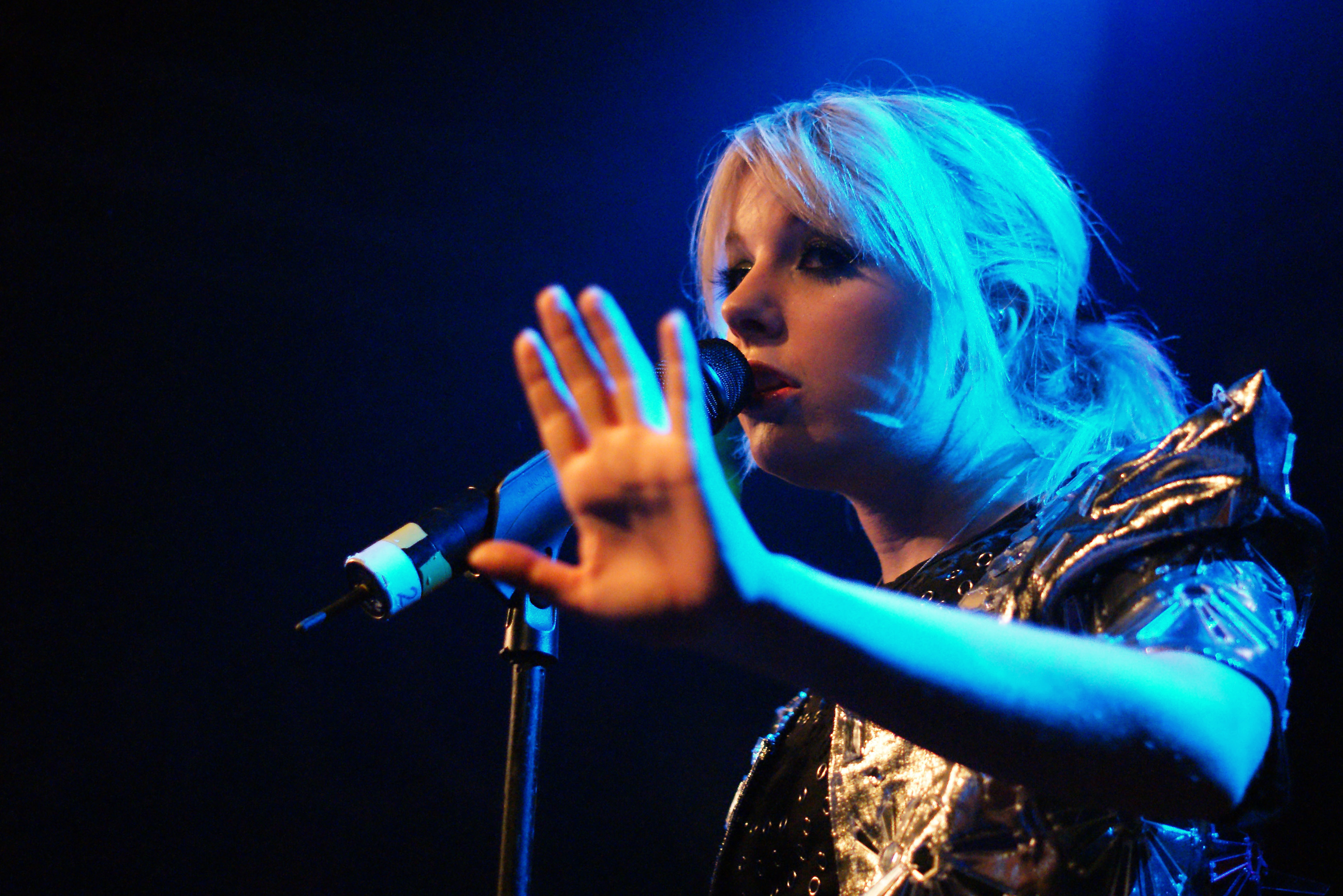
- Little Boots performing in March 2010
- Studio albums: 4
- Extended plays: 10
- Live albums: 1
- Singles: 18
- Music videos: 16
- Mixtapes: 10
- Promotional singles: 4

English singer and songwriter Little Boots has released four studio albums, one live album, 10 extended plays, 10 mixtapes, 18 singles (including four as a featured artist), four promotional singles and 16 music videos.

Little Boots debuted in 2005 as the lead singer of the electronic band Dead Disco. The group disbanded in 2008 after releasing four singles in the United Kingdom.

Her solo debut album, Hands, was released in June 2009. It reached number five on the UK Albums Chart and was certified gold by the British Phonographic Industry (BPI). The album's second single, "Remedy", peaked at number six on the UK Singles Chart. In the United States, an extended play titled Illuminations was released in June 2009, reaching number 14 on the Billboard Dance/Electronic Albums chart.

Little Boots' second studio album, Nocturnes, was released in May 2013.

== Albums ==
=== Studio albums ===
List of studio albums, with selected chart positions and certifications
Title	Details	Peak chart positions				Certifications
Title	Details	UK	IRE	US Dance	US Heat.	Certifications
Hands	Released: 5 June 2009; Labels: 679, Atlantic; Formats: CD, LP, digital download	5	20	—	7	BPI: Gold
Nocturnes	Released: 3 May 2013; Label: On Repeat; Formats: CD, LP, digital download	45	—	13	8	
Working Girl	Released: 10 July 2015; Labels: On Repeat; Formats: CD, LP, digital download	67	—	7	20	
Tomorrow's Yesterdays	Released: 18 March 2022; Labels: On Repeat; Formats: CD, LP, digital download	—	—	—	—	
"—" denotes a recording that did not chart or was not released in that territory.

=== Live albums ===
Title	Details
Live at Heaven 2013	Released: 11 December 2013; Label: Concert Live; Formats: CD, digital download

=== Mixtapes ===
Title	Details
Automatic Lovers	Released: 2008; Format: Digital download
Computer Fairyland	Released: 2008; Format: Digital download
Magical Tropical	Released: 2008; Format: Digital download
Skull of Dreams	Released: August 2009; Format: Digital download
Shake Until Your Heart Breaks	Released: 20 October 2011; Format: Digital download
Into the Future	Released: 9 March 2012; Format: Digital download
Jubilee Disco	Released: 1 June 2012; Format: Digital download
LittleBootsWeLoveMix	Released: 29 September 2012; Format: Digital download
Easter Disco Bunny Mix	Released: 17 April 2014; Format: Digital download
Burn Mixtape	Released: 28 December 2017; Format: Digital download

== Extended plays ==
List of extended plays, with selected chart positions
Title	Details	Peak chart positions	
Title	Details	US Dance	US Heat.
Arecibo	Released: 18 November 2008; Label: Iamsound; Formats: Digital download, LP	—	—
Little Boots	Released: 5 January 2009; Label: Atlantic; Format: Digital download	—	—
iTunes Live from London	Released: 1 June 2009; Label: 679; Format: Digital download	—	—
Illuminations	Released: 9 June 2009; Label: Elektra; Formats: CD, digital download	14	32
Nocturnal Versions	Released: 20 April 2013; Label: The Vinyl Factory; Formats: 12" vinyl, digital download	—	—
Business Pleasure	Released: 28 November 2014; Label: On Repeat; Formats: 12" vinyl, digital download	—	—
Working Girl (The Remixes Part 1)	Released: 4 September 2015; Label: On Repeat; Format: Digital download	—	—
Working Girl (The Remixes Part 2)	Released: 11 September 2015; Label: On Repeat; Format: Digital download	—	—
Afterhours	Released: 17 June 2016; Label: On Repeat; Format: Digital download	—	—
Burn	Released: 6 April 2018; Label: On Repeat; Format: Digital download	—	—
Jump	Released: 2 August 2019; Label: On Repeat; Format: Digital download, streaming	—	—
"—" denotes a recording that did not chart or was not released in that territory.

== Singles ==
=== As lead artist ===
List of singles as lead artist, with selected chart positions and certifications, showing year released and album name
Title	Year	Peak chart positions			Certifications	Album
Title	Year	UK	IRE	NZ	Certifications	Album
"New in Town"	2009	13	16	29		Hands
"Remedy"	2009	6	5	21	BPI: Silver	Hands
"Earthquake"	2009	84	—	—		Hands
"Shake"	2011	—	—	—		Nocturnes
"Every Night I Say a Prayer"	2012	—	—	—		Nocturnes
"Headphones"	2012	—	—	—		Non-album single
"Broken Record"	2013	—	—	—		Nocturnes
"Satellite"	2013	—	—	—		Nocturnes
"Better in the Morning"	2015	—	—	—		Working Girl
"No Pressure"	2015	—	—	—		Working Girl
"If..!" (with Jean Michel Jarre)	2015	—	—	—		Electronica 1: The Time Machine
"Get Things Done"	2015	—	—	—		Working Girl
"Shadows" (featuring Joyce Muniz)	2018	—	—	—		Burn
"Picture" (featuring Lauren Flax)	2018	—	—	—		Burn
"Secret"	2019	—	—	—		Jump
"Silver Balloons"	2021	—	—	—		Tomorrow's Yesterdays
"Landline"	2021	—	—	—		Tomorrow's Yesterdays
"Crying on the Inside"	2022	—	—	—		Tomorrow's Yesterdays
"Out (Out)"	2022	—	—	—		Tomorrow's Yesterdays
"—" denotes a recording that did not chart or was not released in that territory.

=== As featured artist ===
Title	Year	Album
"Heartbeat" (John Dahlbäck featuring Little Boots)	2014	Non-album singles
"Magic Hour" (RAC featuring Little Boots)	2015	Non-album singles
"You and Me" (Karma Fields featuring Little Boots)	2018	Non-album singles
"Fridaycity" (Sharam Jey featuring Little Boots)	2018	Non-album singles

=== Promotional singles ===
List of promotional singles, with selected chart positions, showing year released and album name
Title	Year	Peaks	Album
Title	Year	UK	Album
"Stuck on Repeat"	2008	—	Arecibo
"Meddle"	2008	97	Arecibo
"Superstitious Heart"	2013	—	Non-album single
"Motorway"	2013	—	Nocturnes
"—" denotes a recording that did not chart or was not released in that territory.

== Other charted songs ==
List of other charted songs, with selected chart positions, showing year released and album name
Title	Year	Peaks	Album
Title	Year	UK	Album
"Love Kills"	2009	112	Illuminations

== Guest appearances ==
List of non-single guest appearances, showing year released and album name
Title	Year	Album
"Work It Out" (Heads We Dance and Little Boots)	2009	Sirens
"Beat Again"	2009	Radio 1's Live Lounge – Volume 4
"Rich Boys"	2009	Reprises Inrocks Vol. 3
"Better"	2012	Electronic Beats Compilation 2012
"Smalltown Boy"	2012	Uncovered Vol. 4

== Remixes ==
Title	Year	Artist	Album
"Bring It On" (Little Boots Remix)	2008	Leon Jean-Marie	"Bring It On" (single)
"Leave!" (Little Boots Mix)	2009	V V Brown	"Leave!" (single)
"Juicy Lucy (Needs a Boogieman)" (Little Boots Remix)	2012	Jupiter	"Juicy Lucy (Needs a Boogieman)" (single)
"This City's Local Italo Disco DJ Has a Crush on Me" (Little Boots Discotheque Remix)	2013	Sally Shapiro	Elsewhere
"Love Is a Bourgeois Construct" (Little Boots Discothèque Edit)	2013	Pet Shop Boys	"Love Is a Bourgeois Construct" (single)

== Music videos ==
Title	Year	Director(s)	Ref.
"New in Town"	2009	Jake Nava	
"Remedy"	2009	David Wilson	
"Earthquake"	2009	David Wilson	
"Every Night I Say a Prayer"	2012	Zaiba Jabbar	
"Headphones"	2012	Bullion Collective	
"Broken Record"	2013	The Au Agency	
"Satellite"	2013	Victoria Hesketh and Sam Brown	
"Shake"	2013	Delaney Bishop	
"Taste It"	2014	Ish Sahotay	
"Better in the Morning"	2015	Nova Dando	
"No Pressure"	2015	Storme Whitby-Grubb	
"Get Things Done"	2015	Nova Dando	
"Shadows" (featuring Joyce Muniz)	2018	Marion Bergin	
"Picture" (featuring Lauren Flax)	2018	Marion Bergin	
"Eros" (featuring Planningtorock)	2018	Marion Bergin	
"River" (featuring Cora Novoa)	2018	Marion Bergin	
