= Stuck on Repeat (song) =

Promotional single by Little Boots

from the EP Arecibo
- Written: 2007
- Released: February 2008
- Genre: Electropop; synth-pop
- Length: 6:58 (full length); 3:22 (album version)
- Label: 679; Iamsound
- Songwriters: Victoria Hesketh; Greg Kurstin; Joe Goddard
- Producer: Joe Goddard

Little Boots singles chronology
"Stuck on Repeat" (2008)	"Meddle" (2008)

Audio sample
- file; help

"Stuck on Repeat" is a song by English singer and songwriter Little Boots from her debut extended play, Arecibo (2008), and later appearing on her debut studio album, Hands (2009). Written by Little Boots, Greg Kurstin and Joe Goddard, and produced by the latter, the song was released as a promotional single in the United Kingdom in February 2008. The song was recorded in the bedroom of Joe Goddard in London, and is heavily inspired by the disco era, with a focus on romantic obsession with music and rhythm as a metaphor. "Stuck on Repeat" was initially released as a seven-minute track, later being re-composed to a three-minute track for Arecibo and Hands.

Upon release, "Stuck on Repeat" was met with critical acclaim from music critics, who praised its electro-pop aesthetic, Hesketh's vocal performance, and its addictive rhythm. The song became a hit with online listeners, and was celebrated as one of the best songs of 2008 by Pitchfork. Additionally, many music journalists cite "Stuck on Repeat" as Little Boots' breakout release, with the song being used to promote her debut album, Hands. Nearly a year after its release, "Stuck on Repeat" debuted on Billboard's Dance Singles Sales chart, where it peaked at position number seven. "Stuck on Repeat" was also nominated by the Popjustice £20 Music Prize for Best British Pop Single.

== Background and writing ==
"Stuck on Repeat" was originally written in secret by Little Boots while still with her band, Dead Disco. According to Hesketh, her band disliked her songs, which directed her to upload her songs to YouTube and MySpace, which included early samples of "Stuck on Repeat".

"Stuck on Repeat" was composed by Little Boots and Goddard with Australian singer Kylie Minogue in mind. The song was recorded in Goddard's bedroom, with much of its development taking place over email. Little Boots described the recording process as "weird" because she mostly communicated with Goddard through e-mail. Whenever he was in London she would visit his home and record her vocals. The track was inspired by the disco era and describes romantic infatuation using music as a metaphor. The song was primarily composed with Little Boots' personal Tenori-on, an electrical Japanese instrument. "Stuck on Repeat" was also composed using synthesizers, keyboards, and chimes.

== Promotion and release ==
Prior to the song's official release, "Stuck on Repeat" was intentionally leaked online by Little Boots' manager across various platforms, including influential blogs. The song became an online hit with online listeners, and many believed the track was recorded by Kylie Minogue or Goldfrapp, with Little Boots' identity being purposely kept a secret. On 12 February 2008, Little Boots uploaded an acoustic performance of the song on her YouTube page. By 24 February, the song was officially released, with Little Boots' identity being revealed.

The song was cut down from six minutes to three minutes for the release of Arecibo. The extended play was released on 18 November 2008, and received a limited physical release of vinyl records. A remix of "Stuck on Repeat" by Fake Blood was officially released alongside Arecibo. "Stuck on Repeat" was included as an encore track for Hesketh's debut studio album, Hands, which released on 5 June 2009.

== Critical reception ==
Upon release, "Stuck On Repeat" garnered critical acclaim from music critics. Many music journalists have praised the song for its originality, composition, lyrics, instrumentals, and Little Boots' vocal performance. Many critics have also compared the song to other tracks by similar artists, including Kylie Minogue ("Can't Get You Out of My Head"), Kate Bush ("Running Up that Hill"), and La Roux ("Quicksand").

New Musical Express called the song "perfect as it’s possible for a pop song to get," praising its "edginess" and calling the track "staggeringly brilliant". NME also cited the track as the best song off Hesketh's album, Hands. In an interview for The Guardian, DJ Annie Mac applauded the track for its technical advancement and Little Boots' overall talent. Peter Paphides of The Times called the song the "best moment" off the album, praising Hesketh's writing and the song's overall "exquisite vulnerability". In a review for Hands, Drowned in Sound celebrated "Stuck on Repeat" as a prevailing pop track, and Hesketh's best song, writing: "‘Stuck On Repeat’ is her best known song, and more or less sets the tone – simple lyrical conceit revolving around dancefloor culture [...], unshowy vocal, slightly dirty electronic bed that fades in and out in pulsating waves, catchy tune that isn’t rammed down your throat." Lizzy Goodman for New York Magazine applauded the song, calling it a "throbbing dance track about the curious pleasure of being miserable in love". The Fader highly praised the track as a unique pop song, writing: "With entranced lyrics that echo the song’s hypnotic pulse, everything from the sleigh bell jingle to the Moroder synth-throbs create a dynamic synergy in “Stuck on Repeat” that pop royalty blows million-dollar budgets looking for." Additionally, The Fader also awarded Little Boots the unofficial title of "The Future of British Pop".

Pitchfork included "Stuck on Repeat" on their list of the best songs released in 2008, praising the writing, Hesketh's vocals, and sleighbell accents, further calling the track a "blood-pumping throb" complimented by "Hesketh's light-headed vocals [that] swim around in the heavenly, beat-free middle section before being sucked back into the vortex." "Stuck on Repeat" was also nominated by the Popjustice £20 Music Prize for Best British Pop Single, losing to Girls Aloud's "Call the Shots".

=== Commercial performance ===
"Stuck on Repeat" debuted on Billboard's Dance Singles Sales chart on 25 April 2009, reaching a peak position of number seven, where it remained for two weeks.

== Live performances ==
Little Boots (2009) performing live with her Tenori-On, an instrument she regularly utilizes during live performances

Little Boots has performed "Stuck on Repeat" several times throughout her career. Little Boots began performing “Stuck on Repeat” during her early live appearances in 2008, before the release of Hands. Her early performances also incorporated electronic instruments including the Tenori-on, keyboard and stylophone, which became associated with her live performances and production. The first time she performed the song live was on 26 September 2008 in Brighton. She performed an acoustic version of the song live on Later... with Jools Holland on 5 November 2008.

The song became a regular part of Hesketh's performances during the promotion of Hands in 2009. She performed the song using the Tenori-on on BBC Breakfast on 11 May 2009. It was subsequently included in her set at the Glastonbury Festival on 26 June, where it closed her performance on the John Peel Stage, preceded by her performances of “Every Little Heartbeat”, “Meddle”, “New in Town”, “Click”, “Mathematics”, “Symmetry”, “Remedy” and “Love Kills.” At T in the Park on 12 July, the song concluded her seven-song set and received what NME described as “rapturous applause.” It also closed her August 19 performance at the Gibson Guitar Studio in London, where she performed with two backing singers, a keyboardist and drummer. The song was similarly performed at Leeds Festival later that month.

The song remained part of Little Boots' repertoire after the initial Hands promotional cycle. At the Sziget Festival in Budapest in 2013, while promoting her album Nocturnes, “Stuck on Repeat” was included as an encore track. Little Boots also performed the song at Heaven in London, which was presented at the end of her show, alongside "Satellite". In 2015, “Stuck on Repeat” continued to appear during live performances of her subsequent album, Working Girl. At her 7 July 2015 performance at Oslo in London, "Stuck on Repeat" was the ninth entry in a set that also included material from Nocturnes and Hands, with the performance also including use of the Korg MS20 and live vocal effects.

== Charts ==
Charts	Peak position
Dance Single Sales (Billboard)	7

== Track listings ==
- UK promotional CD single #1

(Released February 2008)

1. "Stuck on Repeat" – 6:58
2. "Stuck on Repeat" (Dub) – 7:38
- UK promotional CD single #2

(Released February 2008)

1. "Stuck on Repeat" (Full Length) – 6:51
2. "Stuck on Repeat" (Dub) – 7:40
3. "Stuck on Repeat" (Edit) – 3:58
- UK promotional CD single #3

(Released February 2008)

1. "Stuck on Repeat" (Fake Blood Remix) – 6:28
2. "Stuck on Repeat" (Rory Phillips Re-edit) – 6:18
- UK promotional CD single #4

(Released November 2008)

1. "Stuck on Repeat" (Ali Wilson Tekelec Remix) – 8:17
- UK promotional CD single #5

(Released 2008)

1. "Stuck on Repeat" (Alexander Robotnick Remix) – 8:48
2. "Meddle" (Joker Remix) – 3:51
3. "Meddle" (Treasure Fingers Remix) – 5:40
- UK limited-edition promotional 12" single

(Released December 2008)

A. "Stuck on Repeat" (Alexander Robotnick Remix) – 8:48
B. "Meddle" (Joker Remix) – 3:51

== See also ==
- Little Boots discography
