= Little Boots (EP) =

EP by Little Boots
- Released: 5 January 2009
- Genres: Electropop; synth-pop; dance-pop; nu-disco
- Length: 10:17
- Labels: 679; Atlantic
- Producers: Joe Goddard; Kid Gloves; Greg Kurstin

Little Boots chronology
Arecibo (2008)	Little Boots (2009)	Hands (2009)

Little Boots is the second extended play (EP) by English singer Little Boots, released exclusively to the iTunes Store on 5 January 2009 by 679 Recordings and Atlantic Records.

== Reception ==
Professional ratings
Review scores
Source	Rating
Digital Spy	4/5 stars
Yahoo! Music	9/10 stars

Upon release, Little Boots was met with highly positive reviews.

== Track listing ==
Digital download
No.	Title	Writer(s)	Producer(s)	Length
1.	"Mathematics"	Victoria Hesketh; Greg Kurstin; Joe Goddard	Kurstin; Goddard	3:24
2.	"Meddle" (Tenori-On Piano Version)	Hesketh; Kurstin; Goddard	Goddard; Kurstin^{[a]}	3:12
3.	"Love Kills"	Freddie Mercury; Giorgio Moroder	Kid Gloves	3:41
Total length:				10:17

Promotional CD
No.	Title	Writer(s)	Producer(s)	Length
1.	"Stuck on Repeat" (Edit)	Hesketh; Kurstin; Goddard	Goddard	3:20
2.	"Meddle" (Tenori-On Piano Version)	Hesketh; Kurstin; Goddard	Goddard; Kurstin^{[a]}	3:12
3.	"Love Kills"	Mercury; Moroder	Kid Gloves	3:41
Total length:				10:13

Notes

- ^{^a} signifies a co-producer.
