= Earthquake (Little Boots song) =

Single by Little Boots

from the album Hands
- B-side: "Catch 22"
- Released: 16 November 2009
- Genre: Electropop; synth-pop
- Length: 4:04
- Label: 679; Atlantic
- Songwriter(s): Victoria Hesketh; Greg Kurstin
- Producer(s): Greg Kurstin

Little Boots singles chronology
"Remedy" (2009)	"Earthquake" (2009)	"Shake" (2011)

"Earthquake" is a song by English recording artist Little Boots from her debut studio album, Hands (2009). Written by Boots and Greg Kurstin and produced by Kurstin, the song was released in the United Kingdom on 16 November 2009 as the album's third and final single. It debuted at number eighty-four on the UK Singles Chart, dropping off the chart the following week.

== Critical reception ==
"Earthquake" received very positive reviews from critics. Emily Mackay from the NME referred to the song as a "strikingly affecting, emotionally naked galactic banger." Nick Levine from Digital Spy wrote that the song "begins with a colossal onslaught of synths and doesn't ease off." Fraser McAlpine of the BBC Chart Blog believed that the track is "not as instant or as infectious as 'Remedy', and is instead a bit more inward-looking and even a bit glum in places, but Boots actually pulls off my favourite pop trick of contrasting some quite depressing lyrics with some quite jolly sounds." He also went on to compare it to The Human League. Andrzej Lukowski of Drowned in Sound commented that "the wistful sigh and thrum of its chorus charging with hangdog allure a hook that could so easily have been fine-tuned into nagging infectiousness." The Guardian's Alex Petridis stated that the song "harnesses its fantastic tune to the plasticky, wildly uncool euphoria of late 90s trance."

== Music video ==
The song's music video was directed by David Wilson and had its premiere on 16 October 2009 on Boots's official YouTube channel and on Perez Hilton's website. It shows Boots singing in front of a big city, playing her Casio SK-5 and catching tears falling in slow motion, as well as galaxy lights and light strobes.

== Commercial performance ==
"Earthquake" debuted at number eighty-four on the UK Singles Chart for the week of 22 November 2009, spending one week only on the chart and therefore failing to match the commercial success of her previous singles.

== Track listings ==
These are the track listings and formats of major single releases of "Earthquake".

UK CD single

1. "Earthquake" – 3:25

UK promo CD single

(Released 28 September 2009)

1. "Earthquake" (Radio Edit) – 3:25
2. "Earthquake" (Sasha Remix) – 7:51
3. "Earthquake" (Clap Mike Amour Remix) – 3:46
4. "Earthquake" (Dekker & Johan Remix) – 7:04
5. "Earthquake" (Treasure Fingers' Epicwave Remix) – 6:28

UK 7" single
A1. "Earthquake" – 4:04
B1. "Catch 22" – 3:41

UK 12" single
A1. "Earthquake" (Sasha Remix) – 7:54
A2. "Earthquake" (Joy for Life Remix) – 7:00
B1. "Earthquake" (Treasure Fingers' Epicwave Remix) – 6:28
B2. "Earthquake" (Gold Panda Remix) – 5:00

UK and Japanese iTunes EP

1. "Earthquake" (Joy for Life Remix) – 7:00
2. "Earthquake" (Sasha Remix) – 7:54
3. "Earthquake" (Treasure Fingers' Epicwave Mix) – 6:34
4. "Earthquake" (Gold Panda Remix) – 4:58

== Charts ==
Chart (2009)	Peak position
UK Singles Chart	84

== Release history ==
Country	Date	Format	Label
United Kingdom	13 November 2009	679 Artists, Atlantic Records	Digital EP
United Kingdom	16 November 2009	679 Artists, Atlantic Records	CD single, 7" single, 12" single
