= Illuminations (EP) =

EP by Little Boots
- Released: 9 June 2009
- Genre: Synth-pop; nu-disco; dance-pop
- Length: 21:15
- Label: Elektra
- Producer: Joe Goddard; Simon Gogerly; Kid Gloves; Greg Kurstin; Simon Lord; Sebastian Muravchik; Ali Renault

Little Boots chronology
Hands (2009)	Illuminations (2009)	Nocturnes (2013)

Professional ratings
Review scores
Source	Rating
Rolling Stone	3/5 stars
Spin	7/10 stars
The Vancouver Sun	4/5 stars

Illuminations is the fourth extended play (EP) by English singer Little Boots. It was released in the United States and Canada on 9 June 2009 by Elektra Records. Released as a digital download, the extended play was accompanied by a digital booklet and a music video for the song "New in Town". In Canada, Illuminations was also released on CD.

== Track listing ==
No.	Title	Writer(s)	Producer(s)	Length
1.	"New in Town"	Victoria Hesketh; Greg Kurstin	Kurstin	3:19
2.	"Stuck on Repeat"	Hesketh; Kurstin; Joe Goddard	Goddard	3:21
3.	"Not Now"	Hesketh; Roy Kerr; Anu Pillai; Eg White	Kid Gloves	3:51
4.	"Magical"	Hesketh; Simon Lord	Sebastian Muravchik; Ali Renault; Simon Lord^{[a]}; Simon Gogerly^{[a]}	3:45
5.	"Love Kills"	Giorgio Moroder; Freddie Mercury	Kid Gloves	3:41
6.	"New in Town" (video)			3:18

Notes

- ^{^a} signifies an additional producer.

== Personnel ==
Credits adapted from the liner notes of Illuminations.

- Chrissie Abbott – design
- Benedict Cooper – "New in Town" video producer
- Tom Elmhirst – mixing (tracks 2, 3)
- Serban Ghenea – mixing (track 1)
- Joe Goddard – production (track 2)
- Simon Gogerly – additional production, mixing (track 4)
- John Hanes – mix engineering (track 1)
- Kid Gloves – production (tracks 3, 5); mixing (track 5)
- Greg Kurstin – production (track 1)
- Oli Isaacs – management
- Simon Lord – additional production (track 4)
- Sebastian Muravchik – production (track 4)
- Jake Nava – "New in Town" video director
- Dan Parry – mixing assistance (track 2)
- Ali Renault – production (track 4)
- Tim Roberts – assistant mix engineering (track 1)
- Karen Tillotson – management

== Charts ==
Chart (2009)	Peak position
US Top Dance Albums (Billboard)	14
US Heatseekers Albums (Billboard)	32

== Release history ==
Region	Date	Format(s)	Label	Ref.
Canada	9 June 2009	CD; digital download	Elektra	
United States	9 June 2009	Digital download	Elektra	
