= New in Town (disambiguation) =

New in Town is a 2009 film.

New in Town may also refer to:

- "New in Town" (song), a 2009 single by Little Boots
- New in Town, a stand-up comedy special by John Mulaney
