= Jump (EP) =

- Original cover for Jump

EP by Little Boots
- Released: 2 August 2019
- Genres: Electro-pop, dance pop, house
- Length: 15:07
- Label: On Repeat Records
- Producers: Victoria Hesketh; Cyril Hahn; Jordan Reyes

Little Boots chronology
Burn (2018)	Jump (2019)	Tomorrow's Yesterdays (2022)

Singles from Jump
- 1. "Secret" Released: June 14, 2019; 2. "Lesson" Released: July 13, 2019

Jump is the eleventh extended play by English singer-songwriter Little Boots. It consists of four songs; "Jump", "Secret", "Lesson", and "Mistake". The EP was written and produced by Hesketh, Jordan Reyes, and Cyril Hahn, and released on 2 August 2019 through On Repeat Records. Jump is only available in digital format, having no release on CD or vinyl format.

According to Little Boots, Jump is about "rediscovering your inner strength and identity", with themes of self-identity, motivation, acceptance, and taking chances. It also plays homage to a difficult time in Little Boots' life, during her move from Los Angeles to the United Kingdom. The track "Lesson" features background vocals from DJ Kiddy Smile, with the former and "Secret" being released as lead singles for the EP.

Upon release, Jump received positive reviews from critics, with praise towards Little Boots' creativity and the EP's overall themes of self-discovery.

== Background and composition ==
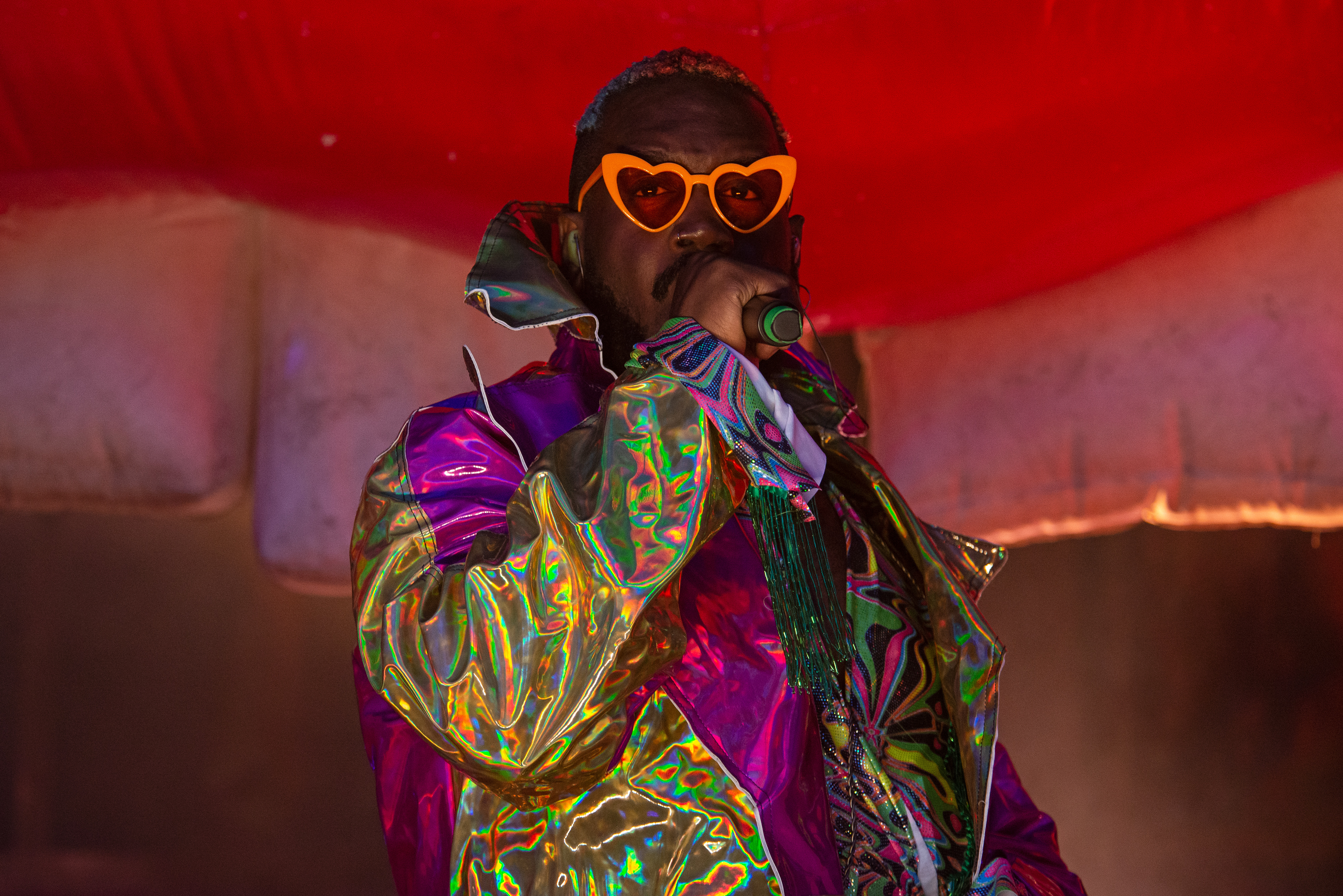
Kiddy Smile (pictured) was featured on the EP's second single, "Lesson"

Little Boots recorded and wrote all the songs for Jump while working on the re-release of Hands to celebrate its tenth anniversary. According to Little Boots, the EP is "about a jumping off point, about rediscovering your inner strength and identity and reaching a place where you are ready to take risks again, about throwing caution to the wind and challenging yourself [...] It reflects my own personal journey since moving to LA two years ago, coming through difficult times and realizing that sometimes choosing yourself is the most powerful decision, and that you are the architect of your own happiness."

The track "Jump" was inspired by Hesketh's personal life, where she "just drove out to the desert near Joshua Tree and rented an Airbnb that happened to have a grand piano just looking out on the desert." The track was also inspired by the desert's day and night cycles, which Little Boots described as "beautiful" and inspiring on her final night stay. The track "Secret" was recorded in Los Angeles and produced by Jordan Reyes. The song was written in a day, with a channeled "super minimalist pop vibe". The song was written around the themes of vulnerability and dating culture. The track "Lesson" was performed alongside DJ Kiddy Smile who provided subtle background vocals.

Jump was written and produced by Little Boots, Cyril Hahn, and Jordan Reyes through 2018 and 2019, during the artist's movement from Los Angeles to the United Kingdom. The EP's album artwork, which depicts Hesketh laid out surrounded by scattered music tapes, was inspired by the #flauntyourwealth movement, which Little Boots described as "a craze that went viral initially in China where wealthy kids and influencers were photographed posing as if they had fallen out of their expensive cars or houses with all their wealth displayed around them as if they’d just dropped it". The EP's album cover was photographed by Lucrecia Taormina.

== Promotion and release ==
"Secret" was released as a promotional single on 14 June 2019. "Lesson" was also released as a promotional single, which features DJ Kiddy Smile, and was released on 13 July 2019. The EP was first announced by Little Boots on her Instagram account, and released on 2 August 2019.

Jump is exclusive to digital audio format, and did not receive a CD or vinyl record release.

== Reception ==
Professional ratings
Aggregate scores
Source	Rating
Album of the Year	80/100
Review scores
Source	Rating
Bizarro	3.5/5
Spectrum Culture	8/100
Jenesaispop	7.3/10

Upon release, Jump received positive reviews from critics, particularly for its writing, themes, and Little Boots' creativity. According to the review aggregator Album of the Year, the extended play holds an 80% positive rating. Mick Jacobs for Spectrum Culture scored the work an 8 out of 10, praising the EP for its originality, Little Boots' creativity and her keen attention to detail, writing: "Though it falls into clichés and stumbles at times, it never pretends to have anything figured out. As with any rebirth, the outcome is never really clear until the process ends. Little Boots appears happy to embrace the uncertainty of it all: 'Let me be the question' sounds as affirming as any answer she could give." Lauren Jefferson of Earmilk praised the track "Lesson" for its tone, vocals, and beats, calling it a "effervescent and exotic energy to your ears in a sleek, timeless house track". Jefferson also commended Smile's supporting performance as a "perfect masculine ribbon of vocals". Marianna Salcedo for MXDWN also commended "Lesson" for its style, and praised the track "Secret" as catchy, rhythmic, and clever. However, Salcedo was more critical of the tracks "Jump" and "Mistake", although appreciated the 1980-disco theme of the former. In a contrary review, Raúl Guillén for Jenesaispop praised the EP for its creativity, uniqueness, and style, but was more critical of the track "Lesson", writing: "'Jump' – a leap into the unknown, bidding farewell to insecurity – proves, in short, that Victoria Hesketh is finding herself in the shadows of the night, rather than in the artificial light of the pop world."

== Track listing ==
Jump track listing
No.	Title	Writer(s)	Producer(s)	Length
1.	"Jump"	Victoria Hesketh; Jordan Reyes	Jordan Reyes	4:19
2.	"Secret"	Victoria Hesketh; Jordan Reyes	Jordan Reyes	3:02
3.	"Lesson (featuring Kiddy Smile)"	Victoria Hesketh; Cyril Hahn; Jordan Reyes	Cyril Hahn; Jordan Reyes	3:57
4.	"Mistake"	Victoria Hesketh; Cyril Hahn; Jordan Reyes	Cyril Hahn; Jordan Reyes	3:47
Total length:				15:07
