= Tomorrow's Yesterdays =

- Standard cover

Studio album by Little Boots
- Released: 18 March 2022
- Recorded: 2020–2021
- Studio: Little Boots' residence (Blackpool, England)
- Genres: Synth-pop; disco; nu-disco; dance-pop
- Length: 43:49
- Label: On Repeat
- Producer: Victoria Hesketh

Little Boots chronology
Jump (2019)	Tomorrow's Yesterdays (2022)

Alternative remix cover
- Remix edition cover

Singles from Tomorrow's Yesterdays
- 1. "Silver Balloons" Released: 24 September 2021; 2. "Landline" Released: 26 November 2021; 3. "Crying on the Inside" Released: 25 January 2022; 4. "Out (Out)" Released: 18 February 2022

Tomorrow's Yesterdays is the fourth studio album by English singer and songwriter Little Boots. Solely written and produced by herself, it was released on 18 March 2022 via her own imprint, On Repeat Records. Her first album in seven years, since Working Girl (2015), it was preceded by four singles: "Silver Balloons", "Landline", "Crying on the Inside" and "Out (Out)".

The development behind Tomorrow's Yesterdays began shortly after the start of the COVID-19 pandemic lockdowns in 2020. According to Little Boots, the album was entirely self-produced in order to secure full ownership over her own music, and was funded by her fans through Patreon subscriptions. She also cited that the fans "totally shaped" the album, and provided a mixture of feedback and suggestions throughout its entire development. Tomorrow's Yesterdays is heavily inspired by the disco era, with inspirations from 1970s and 1980s artists. Little Boots also cites the piano as the centerpiece of Tomorrow's Yesterdays, and calls the album a "parallel" to her first studio album, Hands (2009).

Upon release, Tomorrow's Yesterdays received positive reviews from music journalists, who praised Little Boots' departure from her regular themes, while also commending the album's style, uniqueness, personality, and homage to the disco era. Nearly two weeks after the album's release, Tomorrow's Yesterdays topped the Official Album Downloads Chart during the week of 31 March 2022.

== Production ==
Hesketh has stated that the entire album was completely funded from donations and subscriptions on Patreon. Through the site, she also shared "the songwriting and album making process the whole way through", and that the fans "totally shaped" the album as she was able to get feedback on demos and artwork directly from her audience before release.

Hesketh describes the album as "DIY disco pop", citing 70s artists like Elton John, Carole King, and the Bee Gees as inspiration - much of the album's promotion would occur whilst playing the ABBA Voyage tour. She said the decision to self-produce the album was one of some "necessity", given production took place largely during the COVID-19 pandemic.

== Reception ==
Professional ratings
Aggregate scores
Source	Rating
Album of the Year	65/100
Review scores
Source	Rating
DIY Magazine	3.5/5 stars
Jenesaispop	7/10
MusicOMH	3/5 stars
Retro Pop Magazine	5/5 stars

Tomorrow's Yesterdays was met with positive reviews upon release. Critics noted Little Boots' shift with her familiar themes, while also playing homage to the disco era. Chris Hamilton-Peach for DIY Magazine praised the album for its uniqueness, themes, and personality, writing: "Little Boots is perhaps at her most relaxed on her latest, dipping between moods with a devil-may-care nostalgia that delivers on its sequin-glinting, platform-shoed modus operandi." Mitch Mosk for Atwood Magazine wrote a highly positive review of the album, calling it a "radiant, intimate eruption of sweet DIY disco pop." Mosk further commented on the album, writing: "Tomorrow’s Yesterdays comes from a place of passion, honesty, intimate connection, and resilience. It’s not about keeping calm and carrying on; it’s about dancing through the changes and making every moment count; about living life to the fullest, even when things aren’t ideal. You’ve lived through two years of a global pandemic: Treat yourself to a dance." Ben Devlin for MusicOMH also wrote a positive review of the album, but was more critical of its themes and consistency, but praised its production, dedication, and composition.

Connor Gotto for Retro Pop Magazine gave the album a perfect score in their review, praising the album as a "vignette of an unprecedented time in history and testament to Victoria that, when the rug was pulled from under her feet, she bounced back, dusted herself off and created a body of work that’s represents a defining moment in her career."

== Charts ==
Chart (2022)	Peak position
Official Album Downloads Chart	47

== Track listing ==
All tracks are written and produced by Victoria Hesketh.

Tomorrow's Yesterdays – digital download and vinyl
No.	Title	Length
1.	"Love the Beginning"	3:47
2.	"Silver Balloons"	4:25
3.	"Landline"	4:08
4.	"Back to Mine"	4:37
5.	"Crying on the Inside"	3:27
6.	"Heavenly"	3:44
7.	"Deborah"	3:28
8.	"Out (Out)"	4:24
9.	"Want U Back"	4:39
10.	"Nothing Ever Changes"	3:14
11.	"Tomorrow's Yesterdays"	3:50
