= Out (Out) =

Single by Little Boots

from the album Tomorrow's Yesterdays
- Released: 18 February 2022
- Recorded: 2021
- Genre: Synth-pop, disco, dance-pop
- Length: 4:24
- Label: On Repeat Records
- Songwriter: Victoria Hesketh
- Composer: Victoria Hesketh
- Producer: Victoria Hesketh

Little Boots singles chronology
"Crying on the Inside" (2022)	"Out (Out)" (2022)	"Want You Back?" (2022)

"Out (Out)" (Note: The title is officially styled in parentheses. The YouTube videos posted by Little Boots often have the song styled simply as "Out Out", while other times as "Out Out". This article uses "Out (Out)" for consistency.) is a song by English singer-songwriter Little Boots from her fourth studio album, Tomorrow's Yesterdays (2022). It was the album's fourth and final single, released on 18 February 2022 through On Repeat Records. Little Boots wrote and produced the entire song, which was heavily inspired by the desire of leaving her home during the COVID-19 lockdowns in 2020. The song features a mixture of synth-pop and disco, with a focus on Hesketh's vocals and the piano. "Out (Out)" was recorded in Little Boots' home in 2021, and revolves around the themes of loneliness and anticipation, with implicated dark tones. Like the rest of the album, the track was funded through members on her Patreon.

Upon release, "Out (Out)" was met with positive reviews from critics, who praised Hesketh's vocals, writing, and the song's overall message and style.

== Development and production ==
Much like the rest of Tomorrow's Yesterdays, "Out (Out)" was written solely by Little Boots during the 2020 coronavirus pandemic. The song and the album were funded through Patreon donations and subscriptions. It was the final single released by Little Boots to promote Tomorrow's Yesterdays, which released on 18 February 2022.

The song's title plays on the colloquial expression “going out-out,” which refers to going out for a more significant night of socializing, such as dressing up for a date or going to a club. The song was also inspired by Little Boots' hometown, Blackpool.

== Reception ==
Upon release, "Out (Out)" received positive reviews from music journalists, with praise towards the song's production, lyrics, tone, and Hesketh's vocals. In a review for Tomorrow's Yesterdays, RetroPop Magazine called the track " infectious", and compared the track to her earlier album, Nocturnes (2013). In addition, Shaun Smith for The High Note praised the song for Little Boots' "devotion of disco", and compared the style of "Out (Out)" to songs by Rick James. The Playground also applauded the track, celebrating the song for its instrumentals and direction, calling it a "shimerry, joyful slice of dance pop that’s designed to make you feel fabulous at the pre-game with it's [sic] giddy effervescence and euphoric sense of anticipation." In an early review for the track, Aubrey Elizabeth for NME cited "Out (Out)" as a "joyous" pop record. Poptastic Confessions, a dedicated music blog, called the song a "fun song with a groovy beat", further praising the song's direction, lyrics about loneliness, and its allusions to the COVID-19 lockdowns.
