= Meddle (song) =

Promotional single by Little Boots

from the EP Arecibo
- Written: 2008
- Released: 4 August 2008
- Genre: Electropop
- Length: 3:16
- Label: 50 Bones; 679
- Songwriters: Victoria Hesketh; Greg Kurstin; Joe Goddard
- Producers: Joe Goddard; Greg Kurstin

Little Boots singles chronology
| "Stuck on Repeat" (2008) | "Meddle" (2008) | "New in Town" (2009) |

"Meddle" is a song by English singer and songwriter Little Boots from her debut extended play (EP), Arecibo (2008), and later appearing on her debut studio album, Hands (2009). It is the second single written by Little Boots and Joe Goddard, and was released as a limited-edition promotional single in the United Kingdom on 4 August 2008. The song focuses on a woman who has been hurt by a previous relationship and warns another individual not to interfere with her emotional or psychological state, focusing on the tension between attraction and emotional danger and the idea of meddling with someone's “heart” and “mind”.

"Meddle" was met with positive reviews upon release, with praise towards its writing, Little Boots' vocals, and haunting aesthetic. The song peaked on the UK Singles Top 100's chart during the week of 17 January 2009. The song resurged and met a new audience with the release of the Xbox 360 game, Dance Central 2 (2011).

== Background and composition ==
Much like "Stuck on Repeat", "Meddle" was originally written in secret by Little Boots while still with her former band, Dead Disco.

Meddle was recorded in a closed space, with a stylophone, keyboards, and synthesizers.

== Live performances ==
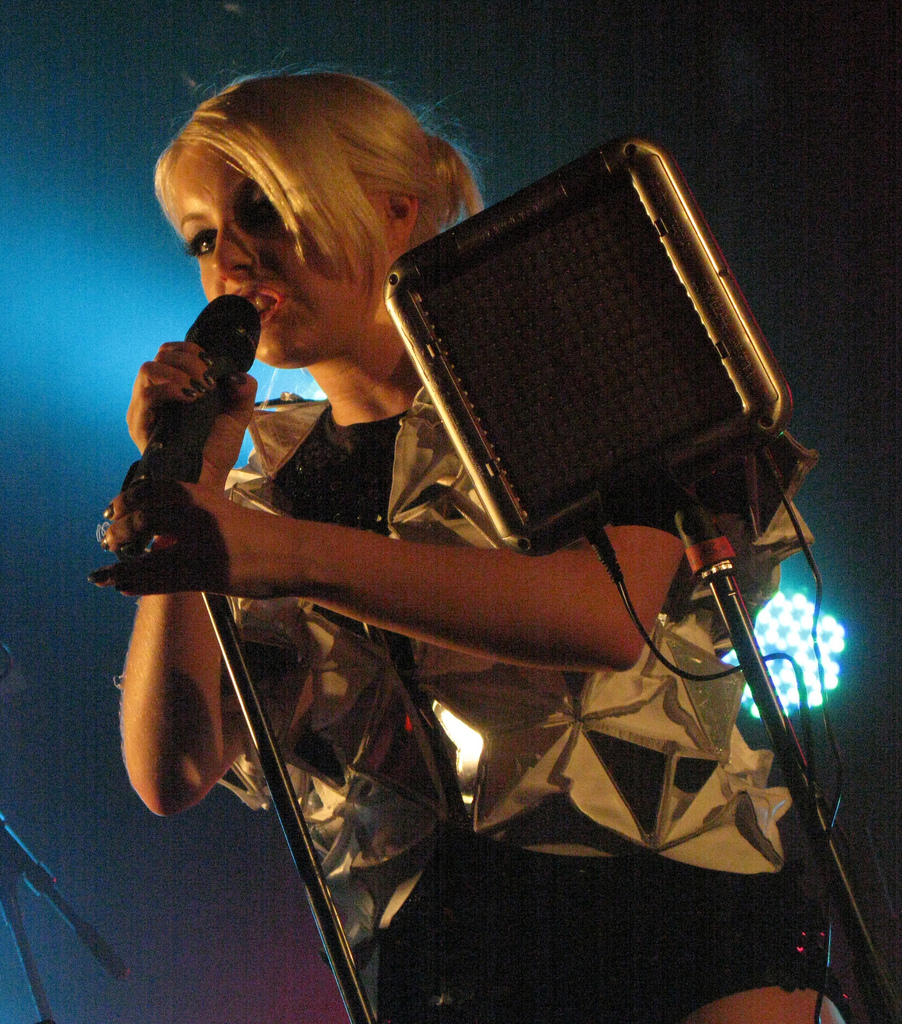
Little Boots performing with her Tenori-on (right), an instrument she regularly uses. It was the primary instrument used during the recording process of "Meddle"

The song has been performed live numerous times by Little Boots. On 7 November 2008, "Meddle" was performed live on the Later… with Jools Holland show, which Hesketh described as a nervous experience. Later that month, Little Boots formed "Meddle" live at Club NME showcase at Annex during CMJ, promoting her new EP, Arecibo. Performing other songs from the upcoming release, the show resulted in multiple technical difficulties.

The song was also performed live at the NME Radio Studio in London on 23 February 2009. The song later aired on 26 February, a few days after the original recording. On 25 March 2009, Little Boots exclusively performed "Meddle" live at the FADER Fort in Austin, Texas with her Tenori-on and stylophone. On 26 June, she performed "Meddle" and other songs off her debut album, Hands, at the John Peel Stage in Glastonbury. In September of that same year, the song was performed with a live band in Toronto, Canada, alongside other songs from Hands.

== Critical reception ==
"Meddle" garnered acclaim from music critics, with praise towards the song's originality, instrumentals, lyrics, and overall composition. In a review for musicOMH, John Murphy called the song a "squealy electro goodness" that had "a terrific bit near the end where the backing vocals seem to turn into Gregorian chants before kicking back into the disco beat." Neil Queen of The Times described it as a "barnstormer" that comes "across like a brain-stabbing disco/drum and bass hybrid." Stephen Ackroyd for DYI praised the song's instrumentals, comparing the track to Gwen Stafani's work. Ian Wade for BBC cited the song, alongside "Stuck on Repeat", as the best moment of Hands. Alex Young for Consequence of Sound called the song "irresistible" and it's addictiveness, praising the track's "crunch bass line, [the] unearthly electronics in the background and [the] eerie choir of men during the bridge". In addition, Miranda Sawyer for The Guardian praised the songwriting and instrumentals, applauding the song's jingles, crisp handclaps, and the "warm, whip-smart, machine-driven" synth composition.

Lauren Down for The Line of Best Fit was slightly more critical of the track and the album Hands as a whole. While she praised "Meddle" as a catchy and upbeat track, Down minimally criticized the track for becoming "tiresome" after multiple listens.

== Legacy ==
In 2009, "Meddle" was featured in an advertisement for Victoria's Secret.

"Meddle" was featured in the 2011 Kinect game, Dance Central 2. The song also makes appearances in the British Comedy Show Friday Night Dinner as a transitional jingle.

== Track listings ==
- UK promotional CD single

(4Bones; released 4 August 2008)

1. "Meddle" – 3:16
- UK limited-edition promotional 7" single

(4Bones; released 4 August 2008)

A. "Meddle" – 3:16
B. "Meddle" (Toddla T & Ross Orton Remix) – 3:23

- Danish promotional CD single – remixes

(Atlantic Records; released 2009)

1. "Meddle" – 3:15
2. "Meddle" (Treasure Fingers Remix) – 5:41
3. "Meddle" (Toddla T and Ross Orton Remix) – 3:28
4. "Meddle" (Tenorion Piano Version) – 3:12

Other versions

- "Meddle" (Baron von Luxxury Technicolor Remix)
- "Meddle" (Ebola Remix)
- "Meddle" (Joker Remix)

== Charts ==
| Chart (2009) | Peak position |
|---|---|
| UK Singles (Official Charts) | 97 |
