= Oh My! =

Indiepop band from Sweden

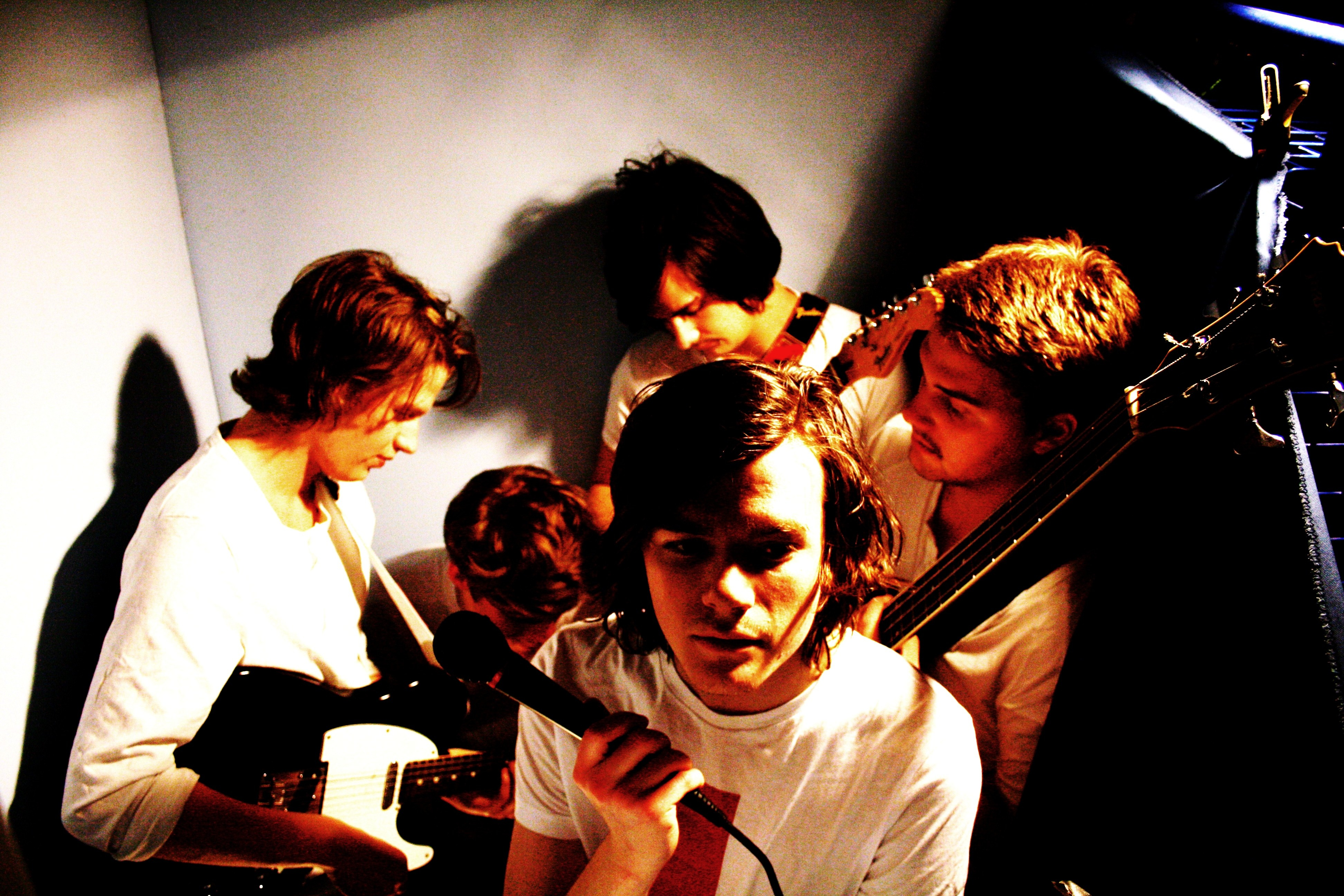
- Oh My!

Background information
- Origin: Sundsvall, Sweden
- Genres: Indie pop
- Years active: 2008–present
- Labels
- Members: Johan Åkerström (vocalist, songwriter); Martin Huss (Guitarist); Adam Lodin (percussionist); Emil Källman (guitarist Adrian Karlman (bassist)
- Website: http://www.ohmymusic.se/

Oh My! is an indiepop band from Sundsvall, Sweden. The band was formed in 2008 by the members of Second Hand Rumours and The Intrigues. In 2011 Oh My! signed with legendary indie label A West Side Fabrications and quickly released their first single Twenty One. Twenty one featured in the MTV Latin America series Niñas Mal and on Swedish national radio. Oh My! Has since that released three more singles which all feature on Swedish national radio. Time Will Tell even qualified for Hall of Fame in the competition "Låtduellen".

== Members ==
- Vocals: Johan Åkerström
- Guitar: Martin Huss
- Guitar: Emil Källman
- Bass: Adrian Karlman
- Drums: Adam Lodin

== Discography ==
=== Albums ===
- Slow Moves (2014)

=== EPs ===
- Twenty One (2011)
- Sunshine in Your Eyes (2012)

=== Singles ===
- "Twenty One" (2011)
- "I Know You" (2011)
- "Time Will Tell" (2011)
- "Fifteen Minutes" (2012)
- "Slow Moves" (2013)
- "People" (2014)
