= Remedy (Little Boots song) =

2009 single by Little Boots

Single by Little Boots

from the album Hands
- B-side: "Love Kills"
- Released: 15 June 2009
- Genre: Dance-pop
- Length: 3:19
- Label: 679; Atlantic
- Songwriters: Victoria Hesketh; RedOne
- Producer: RedOne

Little Boots singles chronology
"New in Town" (2009)	"Remedy" (2009)	"Earthquake" (2009)

Alternative cover
- Promotional and Japanese cover

"Remedy" is a song by English recording artist Little Boots from her debut studio album, Hands (2009). Written by Little Boots and RedOne, the song was released as the album's second single on 15 June 2009 in Japan and on 17 August 2009 in the United Kingdom, becoming Little Boots' most successful single on the UK Singles Chart. A remix EP of the song was also made available on the US iTunes Store on 8 December 2009.

"Remedy" received positive reviews from critics, with praise towards the song's production and catchy tune. It remains Little Boots' most successful single to date, with the track appearing on several end-of-the-year lists and peaking on multiple charts in 2009.

== Background and writing ==
Little Boots composed "Remedy" in Los Angeles with RedOne over a two-day period. She initially found working with RedOne intimidating because their collaboration was expected to produce a hit song. According to Little Boots, "Remedy" "is about dancing and music being a remedy to some kind of poison in your life. I wanted to write a dark dance pop song a bit like Britney Spears' 'Toxic'. The lyrics are not really very personal, I was more imagining a situation."

Little Boots' label, Warner, thought that the original version of the song was, "Too Euro", which led to the song having to be unpicked and a new chorus written for it. Of the final version, she told Songwriting Magazine:

"It’s kind of a big dumb pop song but it’s a good one. Even now, when I play it – even if I do an acoustic version – it’s a powerful song. They don’t go away, songs like that, they’re robust. It’s that magic formula of a great hook, a great lyric, great melody and great chord progression. Simple but powerful. When that all comes together, to take a song to the next level, that is something quite magical."

== Critical reception ==
"Remedy" received positive reviews from music critics. David Balls wrote for Digital Spy that the song "has all the right ingredients to steer the good ship Boots towards safer seas. It's got a big synthy intro, a bombastic chorus reminiscent of late eighties Kylie, and best of all a sparkling and kaleidoscopic middle 8 that's one of the finest pop moments of the year."

The Guardian's Alexis Petridis stated the track "takes her love of continental pop's shameless melodicism to a saccharine extreme and winds up sounding less like a cool Giorgio Moroder-inspired Italo disco track than something a former Soviet Republic might submit to Eurovision." Emily Mackay of NME magazine called the song "run-of-the-mill". Pitchfork Media reviewer Marc Hogan wrote that while "RedOne lends generic club-rap swagger", he does not find the song convincing.

== Commercial performance ==
"Remedy" made its debut on the UK Singles Chart at number 33 for the week ending 8 August 2009. Due to strong digital downloads, the song climbed to number 14 the following week, selling 12,375 copies. In its fourth week, "Remedy" rose to its peak position of number six, making it Little Boots' highest-charting single. In Ireland, "Remedy" debuted at number 31 on the Irish Singles Chart for the week of 30 July 2009, ultimately peaking at number five on 10 September 2009.

== Music video ==
Directed by David Wilson, the music video for "Remedy" was filmed in London and was described by Little Boots as "much more conceptual and pretty much more me" than the video for "New in Town". It features Little Boots dressed in a silver outfit, playing several keyboards and the Tenori-on. Scenes of Little Boots singing to the camera are intercut with scenes of kaleidoscopic geometric patterns and flashing strobe lights. This music video is not available to view on YouTube in the United States.

== Track listings ==
- UK CD single
1. "Remedy" – 3:19
- UK 7-inch single

A1. "Remedy"
B1. "Love Kills"

- UK 12-inch single

A1. "Remedy" (Rusko's Big Trainers Remix)
B1. "Remedy" (Style of Eye Remix)

- UK and Japanese iTunes EP
1. "Remedy" (Kaskade Club Remix) – 6:02
2. "Remedy" (Wideboys Stadium Radio Edit) – 3:33
3. "Remedy" (Disco Bloodbath Remix) – 6:07
4. "Remedy" (Crazy Cousinz Remix) [Revised] – 4:05
5. "Remedy" (Rusko's Big Trainers Remix) – 4:27
6. "Remedy" (Stonemasons Club Remix) – 7:41
- US iTunes EP – Remixes
1. "Remedy" (Kaskade Club Remix) – 5:59
2. "Remedy" (Stonemasons Club Remix) – 7:41
3. "Remedy" (Avicii Club Mix) – 7:12
- Japanese iTunes single
1. "Remedy" (Radio Edit) – 3:19
2. "Love Kills" – 3:41

== Charts ==
=== Weekly charts ===
Chart (2009–2010)	Peak position
Belgium (Ultratip Bubbling Under Flanders)	12
CIS Airplay (TopHit)	28
Europe (European Hot 100 Singles)	21
Ireland (IRMA)	5
Israel (Media Forest)	7
Japan (Japan Hot 100)	13
New Zealand (Recorded Music NZ)	21
Russia Airplay (TopHit)	31
Scottish Singles Sales (Official Charts)	3
UK Singles (Official Charts)	6
US Dance Airplay (Billboard)	20

=== Year-end charts ===
Chart (2009)	Position
CIS Airplay (TopHit)	179
Russia Airplay (TopHit)	168
UK Singles (OCC)	73

== Certifications ==
Region	Certification	Certified units/sales
United Kingdom (BPI)	Silver	200,000^{^}
^{^} Shipments figures based on certification alone.

== Release history ==
Region	Date	Format(s)	Label(s)	Ref.
Japan	15 June 2009	Digital single	Warner Music	
Japan	20 July 2009	Digital EP	Warner Music	
United Kingdom	17 August 2009	CD single; 7-inch single; 12-inch single	679 Artists; Atlantic	
United Kingdom	20 August 2009	Digital EP	679 Artists; Atlantic	
United States	8 December 2009	Digital EP	Elektra	
