= Working Girl (album) =

Studio album by Little Boots
- Released: 10 July 2015
- Recorded: 2013 – May 2015
- Genres: Synth-pop; disco; dance-pop; house
- Length: 46:17
- Labels: On Repeat; Dim Mak
- Producers: Brassica; Com Truise; Joe Cross; GRADES; Bram Inscore; Chris Kemsley; Lockhardt; Pat Lukens; Dan Nigro; Ariel Rechtshaid; David Sharma; Jas Shaw; Peter Wade

Little Boots chronology
| Nocturnes (2013) | Working Girl (2015) | Burn (2018) |

Singles from Working Girl
- 1. "Better in the Morning" Released: 5 May 2015; 2. "No Pressure" Released: 16 June 2015; 3. "Get Things Done" Released: 30 June 2015

Professional ratings
Aggregate scores
| Source | Rating |
|---|---|
| AnyDecentMusic? | 6.2/10 |
| Metacritic | 64/100 |
Review scores
| Source | Rating |
| Allmusic | 4/5 stars |
| Clash Music | 7/10 |
| Consequence of Sound | B− |
| DIY | 3/5 stars |
| Drowned in Sound | 5/10 |
| Music OMH | 3/5 stars |
| The Guardian | 3/5 stars |
| Slant | 3.5/5 stars |
| The Daily Telegraph | 4/5 stars |

Working Girl is the third studio album by English singer and songwriter, Little Boots. Released on 10 July 2015, it is her first album to be released through her own record label, On Repeat Records, as well as and Dim Mak Records. The album is influenced by late 1980s and early 1990s pop, with themes of corporate ambition, adult womanhood, and autonomy. It was Little Boots' last studio album for nearly seven years, until the release of Tomorrow's Yesterdays in 2022.

Upon release, Working Girl received positive reviews from critics.

== Promotion and release ==
On 5 November 2014, Little Boots released the single "Taste It", taken from her EP Business Pleasure, which was released in December 2014. On 5 May 2015, Little Boots released "Better in the Morning," and announced the following day that her new album would be titled "Working Girl" and would come out on 10 July 2015. The upcoming album's track list also accompanied the announcement.

=== Tour ===
In July 2015, Little Boots embarked on an eight-date tour to promote the album.

Tour dates
| Date | City | Country | Venue |
United Kingdom
| 7 July 2015 | London | England | Oslo |
North America
| 15 July 2015 | Los Angeles | United States | Echo |
| 16 July 2015 | Santa Ana | United States | Constellation Room |
| 17 July 2015 | San Francisco | United States | Popscene |
| 22 July 2015 | Chicago | United States | Studio Paris (DJ set) |
| 23 July 2015 | New York City | United States | Bowery Ballroom |
| 24 July 2015 | Boston | United States | Great Scott |
| 25 July 2015 | Washington, D.C. | United States | U Street Music Hall |

== Commercial performance ==
Working Girl debuted at number 67 on the UK Albums Chart, selling 1,425 copies in its first week.

== Accolades ==
Working Girl was listed in AllMusic's 2015 list of "Favorite Pop Albums".

== Track listing ==
Working Girl – digital download and vinyl
| No. | Title | Writer(s) | Producer(s) | Length |
|---|---|---|---|---|
| 1. | "Intro" | | Chris Kemsley | 0:50 |
| 2. | "Working Girl" | Victoria Hesketh; Dan Traynor; Tom Aspaul | GRADES | 3:56 |
| 3. | "No Pressure" | Hesketh; Pat Lukens; Brett McLaughlin; Liam O'Donnel | Lockhardt | 4:33 |
| 4. | "Get Things Done" | Hesketh; Lukens | Lukens | 3:27 |
| 5. | "Taste It" | Hesketh; Jas Shaw | Shaw | 4:23 |
| 6. | "Real Girl" | Hesketh; Joe Cross | Cross | 4:08 |
| 7. | "Heroine" | Hesketh; Peter Wade; Sally Seltmann; David Sharma | Wade; Sharma | 4:17 |
| 8. | "Interlude" | | Kemsley | 0:32 |
| 9. | "The Game" | Hesketh; Jeppe Laursen | Brassica | 3:24 |
| 10. | "Help Too" | Hesketh; Daniel Nigro | Nigro | 4:53 |
| 11. | "Business Pleasure" | Hesketh; Seth Haley | Com Truise | 3:37 |
| 12. | "Paradise" | Hesketh; Bram Inscore; Shane Stevens | Inscore | 4:06 |
| 13. | "Better in the Morning" | Hesketh; Ariel Rechtshaid | Rechtshaid | 3:22 |

Working Girl – CD bonus tracks
| No. | Title | Writer(s) | Producer(s) | Length |
|---|---|---|---|---|
| 14. | "Desire" | Hesketh; Inscore | Inscore | 3:29 |
| 15. | "Working Girl" (acoustic) | Hesketh; Traynor; Aspaul | Hesketh | 3:51 |

== Charts ==
| Chart (2015) | Peak position |
|---|---|
| UK Albums (Official Charts) | 67 |
| UK Independent Albums (Official Charts) | 8 |
| US Top Dance Albums (Billboard) | 10 |
| US Heatseekers Albums (Billboard) | 20 |

== Release history ==
| Region | Date | Format | Label | Ref. |
|---|---|---|---|---|
| Australia | 10 July 2015 | CD; digital download | Warner | |
| Germany | 10 July 2015 | CD; digital download | Rykodisc | |
| Ireland | 10 July 2015 | CD; digital download | On Repeat; Dim Mak | |
| United Kingdom | 10 July 2015 | CD; digital download | On Repeat; Dim Mak | |
| United States | 10 July 2015 | CD; digital download | On Repeat; Dim Mak | |
| United Kingdom | 28 August 2015 | LP + CD; coloured LP + CD (limited edition) | On Repeat; Dim Mak | |
