= Hands (Little Boots album) =

- Original cover

Studio album by Little Boots
- Released: 5 June 2009
- Recorded: 2008–2009
- Genre: Electropop
- Length: 44:51
- Labels: 679; Atlantic
- Producers: Fred Ball; Joe Goddard; Semothy Jones; Kid Gloves; Greg Kurstin; RedOne; Jas Shaw; Richard "Biff" Stannard

Little Boots chronology
| Little Boots (2009) | Hands (2009) | Illuminations (2009) |

Singles from Hands
- 1. "New in Town" Released: 15 May 2009; 2. "Remedy" Released: 17 August 2009; 3. "Earthquake" Released: 16 November 2009

Hands is the debut studio album by English singer and songwriter Little Boots. It was released on 5 June 2009 by 679 Recordings and Atlantic Records. The album primarily features songs about love, relationships and heartbreak, taking influence from a variety of music styles such as disco, 1980s synth-pop and Eurodance. Hands was preceded by three singles, as well as two promotional singles, "Meddle" and "Stuck on Repeat", from her extended play, Arecibo (2008). The album was reissued for its tenth anniversary with eleven bonus tracks, which included several demos and the original seven-minute version of "Stuck on Repeat", on 1 November 2019.

Upon release, Hands received highly positive reviews from critics, with many complimenting its "well-crafted" pop songs and "diverse" production. Critics also praised the album's polished electronic production, catchy melodies, Little Boots' songwriting, and accessible approach to pop music. The album's first two singles, "New in Town" and "Remedy", peaked at numbers thirteen and six on the UK Singles Chart, respectively, with "Remedy" becoming Little Boots' highest-charting single. The album's third and final single, "Earthquake", peaked at number eighty-four, while the promotional single "Meddle" reached number ninety-seven. Hands topped the charts in Ireland, Japan, Scotland, and Australia. In the United States, it reached number seven on the Billboard's Heatseekers Albums, and was certified gold by the British Phonographic Industry (BPI) for selling over 100,000 copies in the United Kingdom.

Hands and its associated singles received several award nominations, including nominations at the 2009 BRIT Awards and the Popjustice £20 Music Prize for Best British Pop Single for "Stuck on Repeat" and "New in Town". In 2010, Little Boots won the International Dance Music Award for Best Breakthrough Artist (Solo) for her work on Hands.

== Recording and production ==
Little Boots began recording her debut album in Los Angeles with Greg Kurstin and Hot Chip's Joe Goddard in early 2008. While in Los Angeles, she spent two days recording with RedOne. Following the BBC Sound of 2009 poll, which Little Boots won, her record label, management and A&R team scheduled recording sessions with Dr. Luke. These sessions, however, never took place. In January 2009, Little Boots began to compile the album's track listing, a difficult process for the singer, who compared it to "cutting a limb off".

The album's title comes from the song "Hands". Included on the album as a hidden track, its lyrics tell the story of a person with a broken heart who tries desperately to mend it. The album cover for Hands was "inspired by old Italo covers like Patrick Cowley and Amanda Lear that have lots of space and fantasy themes." According to Little Boots, the artwork is a mixture of the past and the present, a reflection of the musical styles featured on the album.

== Composition ==
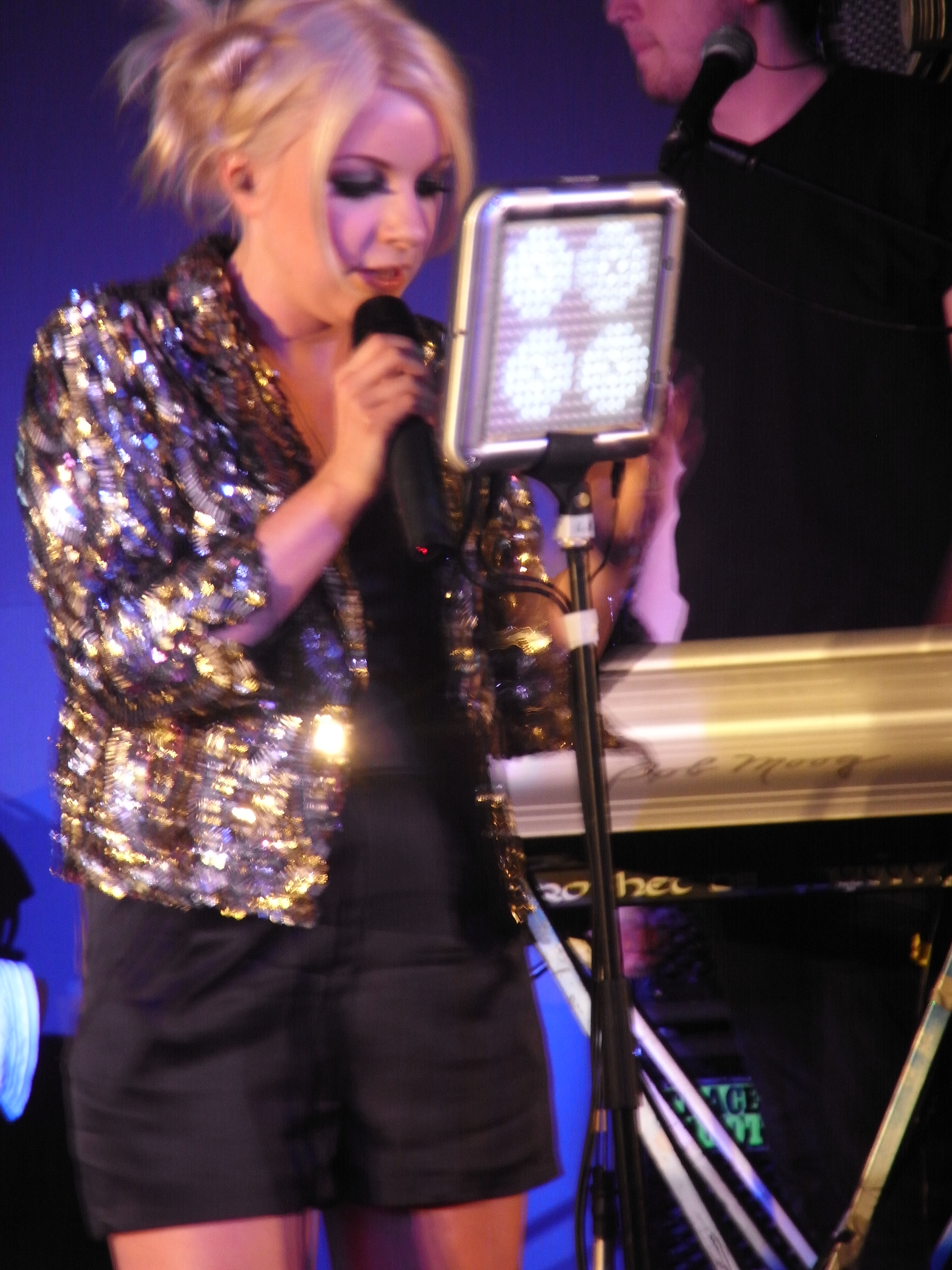
Little Boots performing at the Apple Store in London in May 2009 while promoting Hands

"New in Town", the album's opening track, was inspired by the "seedy side of life" in Los Angeles and the strange individuals Little Boots met while recording Hands. It was chosen as the album's lead single because "it's very bold and colourful and doesn't really sound like anything else out there." Released on 25 May 2009, "New in Town" peaked at number 13 on the UK Singles Chart. The album's second track, "Earthquake", received positive reviews from critics, with one reviewer stating that it was a "strikingly affecting, emotionally naked galactic banger". The song was released as the album's third and final single on 16 November 2009, peaking at number 84 on the UK Singles Chart. "Stuck on Repeat" was composed with Australian singer Kylie Minogue in mind. Inspired by the disco era, it was compared to Donna Summer's 1977 song "I Feel Love" by music critics. The fifth track on the album, "Remedy", was released on 17 August 2009 as the second single from Hands and managed to outpeak its predecessor, reaching number six on the UK Singles Chart.

"Meddle", the album's sixth track, was released as a limited-edition single in August 2008. Described by The Times as a "barnstormer" and a "disco/drum and bass hybrid", it reached number 97 on the UK chart. "Ghost", a song about being ignored by a loved one, received mixed reviews from critics. In a review for The Guardian, Alexis Petridis described it as a "clunky attempt to blend electronics with Brecht-and-Weill oompah". The song "Mathematics" is inspired by Sylvia Plath's poem Love Is a Parallax. In the song, Little Boots uses mathematics as a metaphor for love. The ninth track, "Symmetry", a duet with The Human League singer Philip Oakey, was a "dream" for Little Boots. A fan of the band, she was surprised when Oakey agreed to provide vocals for the track. The synth ballads "Tune into My Heart" and "Hearts Collide" were compared to Minogue, with Gigwise referring to "Hearts Collide" as the "greatest Kylie track never recorded by the Australian". The closing track from Hands, "No Brakes", features a spoken interlude which was compared to the Pet Shop Boys and Mike Yarwood.

== Promotion and release ==
To promote the album, Little Boots did several performances worldwide. Her first televised appearance was on Later... with Jools Holland on 7 November 2008. She was invited to perform on the show after posting songs on the social networking website Myspace. On 4 March 2009, Little Boots appeared on the American late-night television show Last Call with Carson Daly. She was interviewed by Daly and several clips from a Los Angeles nightclub performance were shown. Little Boots performed "Stuck on Repeat" using the Tenori-on on the 11 May 2009 edition of BBC Breakfast. She returned to Later... with Jools Holland on 15 May 2009. This was followed by an appearance on the BBC Radio 4 programme Woman's Hour on 27 May 2009. She also appeared on Friday Night with Jonathan Ross on 3 July 2009. On 26 May 2009, Little Boots performed four songs from Hands at the Apple Store in London. These songs were included on the extended play iTunes Live from London, which was released exclusively through iTunes on 1 June 2009.

The album was released in the United Kingdom on 8 June 2009 as a CD and digital download. Little Boots' official website offered an exclusive bundle for pre-order which included the CD, a limited-edition galactic speckled 12-inch vinyl copy of the album and a 33-minute "Hands On" mix MP3 featuring album material, non-album tracks and remixes. The 12-inch vinyl was limited to 1,000 copies. Due to overwhelming demand, the limited-edition 12-inch vinyl was released on 10 June 2009, two days later than had previously been announced.

== Critical reception ==
Professional ratings
Aggregate scores
| Source | Rating |
|---|---|
| AnyDecentMusic? | 7.0/10 |
| Metacritic | 68/100 |
Review scores
| Source | Rating |
| AllMusic | 4/5 stars |
| Clash | 5/10 |
| Drowned in Sound | 7/10 |
| Entertainment Weekly | B+ |
| The Guardian | 4/5 stars |
| The Independent | 4/5 stars |
| NME | 7/10 |
| Pitchfork | 5.9/10 |
| Rolling Stone | 3/5 stars |
| The Times | 4/5 stars |

Hands received generally positive reviews from music critics. At Metacritic, which assigns a normalised rating out of 100 to reviews from mainstream publications, the album received an average score of 68, based on 20 reviews. Michael Cragg of musicOMH called it "a well-crafted, glorious pop record". K. Ross Hoffman of AllMusic viewed the album as "a solid batch with several standouts [...] but no space-filling duds or truly weak links". David Renshaw of Gigwise described Hands as "a big pop album" that "rival[s] Lady Gaga, Girls Aloud or Lily Allen." Ben Thompson of The Observer complimented the album's "diverse" production and called the song "Symmetry", a duet with Philip Oakey, a "joyous cross-generational head-to-head". Melissa Maerz of Entertainment Weekly commented that on Hands, Little Boots is "great at taking superstar glamour to the streets", dubbing the album "megaclub gold for the broke-ass rest of us." The Guardian's Alexis Petridis referred to Hands as "a surprisingly modern-sounding record from an artist who has been depicted as in thrall to a kitsch vision of 80s pop". Ian Wade of BBC Music praised the album as "a solid pop debut, the sort of album which unites lovers of pop, young and old", and compared it to albums by Goldfrapp, Kylie Minogue and Annie. Emily Mackay of NME wrote that "Little Boots gives us an inspiring story of self-realisation" and called the album "brilliant".

Peter Paphides of The Times named "Stuck on Repeat" the album's "best moment" due to its "exquisite vulnerability". Andrzej Lukowski of Drowned in Sound remarked that "Hesketh can write a damn good pop song, and whether that's what caused the initial buzz, it's something hard to deny when presented with the cold, hard proof of Hands." Marc Hogan of Pitchfork labelled Hands as "a mainstream pop effort with an indie-friendly narrative", while noting that the album's "most distinguishing characteristic is an unusual level of meta-pop self-awareness." The Independent's Andy Gill felt that the album has "safe, conformist electropop grooves following lines as straight and satisfying as supermarket aisles", concluding that "the result is a form of attention-deficit pop: for while 'New in Town' and 'Earthquake' have an instant appeal, it's striking how quickly one's palate is sated by their pop-rock fizz: the listener who can play Hands all the way through is either dedicated, or dead." Paul Schrodt of Slant Magazine argued that while the album "smacks of trying too hard", most of the songs "are imminently playable on their own terms, whether it's a Robyn-style, slow-burning heartache ('No Brakes') or enjoyably Eurotrash camp ('Hearts Collide')." In a mixed review, Joe Zadeh of Clash stated that the album "falls victim to attempts to reach beyond more boundaries than necessary, and thus ironically loses the concentration of the more earnest listener."

== Commercial performance ==
Hands debuted at number five on the UK Albums Chart, selling 19,952 copies in its first week. During its second week, it dropped to number 40. Following the release of "Remedy", the album returned to the top 30 on 23 August 2009 for four consecutive weeks. On 4 September 2009, the album was certified gold by the British Phonographic Industry (BPI) for shipments in excess of 100,000 copies in the UK. Hands debuted at number 20 on the Irish Albums Chart for the week ending 11 June 2009, falling to number 44 the following week and eventually dropping off the chart. On the issue dated 27 June 2009, the album debuted at number 19 on the European Top 100 Albums chart, where it spent four weeks.

Elsewhere, Hands peaked at number four on the ARIA Hitseekers Albums chart in Australia and at number 36 in Japan. In the United States, the album debuted at number seven on Billboard's Heatseekers Albums chart on 20 March 2010. As of March 2013, Hands had sold 17,000 copies in the US, according to Nielsen SoundScan.

== Track listing ==
| No. | Title | Writer(s) | Producer(s) | Length |
|---|---|---|---|---|
| 1. | "New in Town" | Victoria Hesketh; Greg Kurstin | Kurstin | 3:19 |
| 2. | "Earthquake" | Hesketh; Kurstin | Kurstin | 4:04 |
| 3. | "Stuck on Repeat" | Hesketh; Kurstin; Joe Goddard | Goddard | 3:21 |
| 4. | "Click" | Hesketh | Jas Shaw; Fred Ball | 3:16 |
| 5. | "Remedy" | Hesketh; RedOne | RedOne | 3:19 |
| 6. | "Meddle" | Hesketh; Kurstin; Goddard | Goddard; Kurstin^{[a]} | 3:15 |
| 7. | "Ghost" | Hesketh | Shaw; Ball^{[a]}^{[b]} | 3:02 |
| 8. | "Mathematics" | Hesketh; Kurstin; Goddard | Kurstin; Goddard | 3:26 |
| 9. | "Symmetry" (with Philip Oakey) | Hesketh; Roy Kerr; Anu Pillai | Kid Gloves | 4:29 |
| 10. | "Tune into My Heart" | Hesketh; Pascal Gabriel | Gabriel^{[b]}; Semothy Jones | 3:41 |
| 11. | "Hearts Collide" | Hesketh; Richard "Biff" Stannard; Julian Peake | Stannard; Peake | 3:44 |
| 12. | "No Brakes" "Hands" (hidden track) | "No Brakes": Hesketh; Stannard; Peake "Hands": Hesketh | Stannard; Peake; Shaw | 9:59 |

iTunes Store UK bonus tracks
| No. | Title | Writer(s) | Producer(s) | Length |
|---|---|---|---|---|
| 13. | "Meddle" (Tenori-on piano version) | Hesketh; Kurstin; Goddard | Hesketh | 3:12 |
| 14. | "Love Kills" | Giorgio Moroder; Freddie Mercury | Kid Gloves | 3:41 |
| 15. | "New in Town" (No One Is Safe – Al Kapranos Remix) | Hesketh; Kurstin | Kurstin; Alex Kapranos^{[c]} | 5:21 |

Japanese edition bonus tracks
| No. | Title | Writer(s) | Producer(s) | Length |
|---|---|---|---|---|
| 13. | "Catch 22" | Hesketh; Kurstin | Kurstin | 3:41 |
| 14. | "New in Town" (No One Is Safe – Al Kapranos Remix) | Hesketh; Kurstin | Kurstin; Kapranos^{[c]} | 5:21 |
| 15. | "Stuck on Repeat" (acoustic) | Hesketh; Kurstin; Goddard | | 4:27 |
| 16. | "New in Town" (video, directed by Jake Nava) | | | 3:24 |

US iTunes Store deluxe edition bonus tracks
| No. | Title | Writer(s) | Producer(s) | Length |
|---|---|---|---|---|
| 13. | "Catch 22" | Hesketh; Kurstin | Kurstin | 3:43 |
| 14. | "Stuck on Repeat" (acoustic version) | Hesketh; Kurstin; Goddard | | 4:29 |
| 15. | "New in Town" (video, directed by Jake Nava) | | | 3:18 |
| 16. | "Remedy" (video, directed by David Wilson) | | | 3:17 |
| 17. | "Earthquake" (video, directed by David Wilson) | | | 3:29 |

10th Anniversary edition DCD/DLP/Digital download bonus tracks
| No. | Title | Writer(s) | Producer(s) | Length |
|---|---|---|---|---|
| 13. | "Echoes (Demo)" | Little Boots & RedOne | RedOne | 4:01 |
| 14. | "Silhouettes (Demo)" | Little Boots & Richard “Biff” Stannard | Richard “Biff” Stannard | 4:03 |
| 15. | "Cities (Demo)" | Little Boots & James Ford | James Ford | 3:49 |
| 16. | "Contradiction (Demo)" | Little Boots & Pascal Gabriel | Pascal Gabriel | 3:05 |
| 17. | "Souvenirs (Demo)" | Little Boots & Pascal Gabriel | Pascal Gabriel | 4:05 |
| 18. | "Navigator (Demo)" | Little Boots & Patrik Berger | Patrik Berger | 3:35 |
| 19. | "Stuck on Repeat (Original mix)" | | | 6:53 |
| 20. | "Stuck on Repeat (Fake Blood remix)" | | | 6:26 |
| 21. | "Catch 22" | Hesketh; Kurstin | Kurstin | 3:31 |
| 22. | "Not Now" | | | 3:51 |
| 23. | "Magical" | | | 3:45 |

Notes

- ^{^a} signifies an additional producer
- ^{^b} signifies a vocal producer
- ^{^c} signifies a remixer
- Digital versions of the album do not include "Hands" as a hidden track and "No Brakes" is 4:02 (the US Streaming Version has Hands as a Hidden Track).

== Personnel ==
Credits adapted from the liner notes of Hands.

=== Musicians ===
- Little Boots – vocals
- RedOne – vocal arrangement (track 5)
- Philip Oakey – guest vocals (track 9)
- Roy Kerr – programming (track 9)
- Anu Pillai – programming, synthesisers (track 9)

=== Technical ===
- Greg Kurstin – production (tracks 1, 2, 8); mixing (track 2); additional production (track 6)
- Serban Ghenea – mixing (track 1)
- John Hanes – engineering for mix (track 1)
- Tim Roberts – engineering assistance (track 1)
- Joe Goddard – production (tracks 3, 6, 8)
- Tom Elmhirst – mixing (tracks 3, 6, 8–10)
- Dan Parry – mixing assistance (tracks 3, 6, 8–10)
- Jas Shaw – production, mixing (tracks 4, 7); recording ("Hands")
- Fred Ball – production (track 4); additional production, vocal production (track 7)
- Lexxx – mixing (tracks 4, 7)
- RedOne – production, vocal editing, recording, engineering (track 5)
- Johnny Severin – vocal editing, recording, engineering (track 5)
- Robert Orton – mixing (track 5)
- Kid Gloves – production (track 9)
- Anu Pillai – engineering (track 9)
- Jamie Smithson – engineering assistance (track 9)
- Pascal Gabriel – vocal production (track 10)
- Semothy Jones – production (track 10)
- Richard "Biff" Stannard – production (track 11, "No Brakes")
- Julian Peake – production (track 11, "No Brakes")
- Ash Howes – mixing (track 11, "No Brakes")
- Al O'Connell – engineering ("Hands")

=== Artwork ===
- Chrissie Abbott – design
- Jonas Bresnan – photography

== Charts ==
=== Weekly charts ===
| Chart (2009) | Peak position |
|---|---|
| Australian Hitseekers Albums (ARIA) | 4 |
| European Albums (Billboard) | 19 |
| Irish Albums (IRMA) | 20 |
| Japanese Albums (Oricon) | 36 |
| Scottish Albums (Official Charts) | 10 |
| UK Albums (Official Charts) | 5 |

| Chart (2010) | Peak position |
|---|---|
| US Heatseekers Albums (Billboard) | 7 |

=== Year-end charts ===
| Chart (2009) | Position |
|---|---|
| UK Albums (OCC) | 137 |

== Certifications ==
| Region | Certification | Certified units/sales |
|---|---|---|
| United Kingdom (BPI) | Gold | 100,000^{^} |
^{^} Shipments figures based on certification alone.

== Release history ==
| Region | Date | Format | Label | Ref. |
|---|---|---|---|---|
| Ireland | 5 June 2009 | CD; digital download | 679; Atlantic | |
| United Kingdom | 8 June 2009 | CD; digital download | 679; Atlantic | |
| United Kingdom | 10 June 2009 | LP | 679; Atlantic | |
| Australia | 12 June 2009 | CD; digital download | Warner | |
| Germany | 26 June 2009 | CD; digital download | Warner | |
| Japan | 8 July 2009 | CD; digital download | Warner | |
| Canada | 2 March 2010 | CD; digital download | Warner | |
| United States | 2 March 2010 | CD; LP; digital download | Elektra | |
