= Little Boots =

English singer-songwriter and DJ

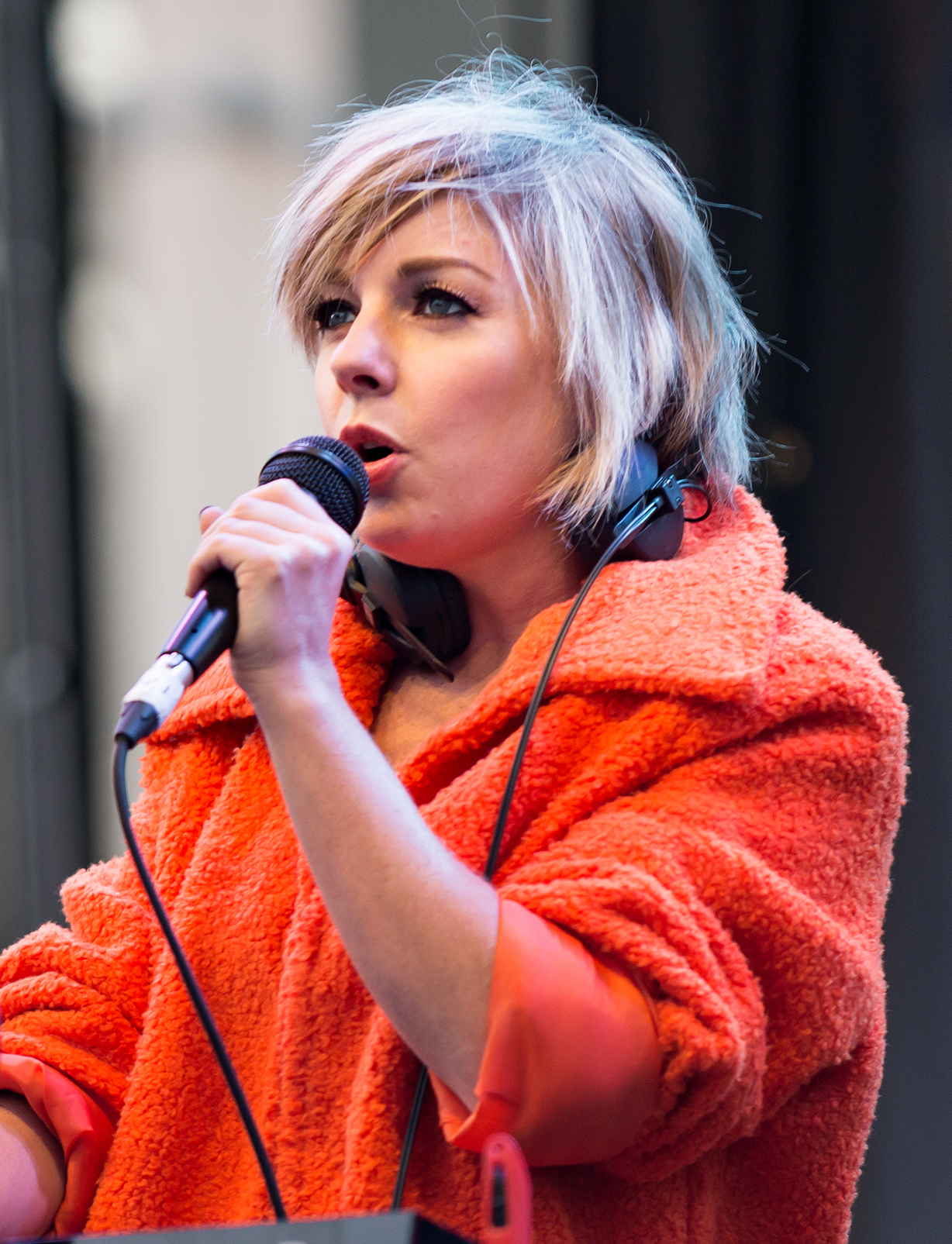
- Little Boots in 2018
- Born: Victoria Christina Hesketh; 1983 or 1984 (age 42–43); Blackpool, Lancashire, England
- Education: University of Leeds
- Occupations: Singer; songwriter; DJ
- Years active: 2005-present
- Notable work: Discography
- Spouse: Ben Mason (2023–present)
- Children: 2
- Awards: Full list
- Musical career
- Genres: Electropop; synth-pop; dance-pop; house; disco
- Instruments: Vocals; piano; keyboards; synthesizer; tenori-on; stylophone
- Labels: IAMSOUND; 679; Atlantic; Kobalt; Elektra; On Repeat
- Formerly of: Dead Disco
- Website: littlebootsmusic.co.uk

Victoria Christina Mason (née Hesketh; born 1983 or 1984), known professionally as Little Boots, is an English singer, songwriter, and DJ. Formerly the lead singer and keyboardist of Dead Disco, she started her musical career in 2005, and rose to prominence after releasing her single, "Stuck on Repeat" (2008). Little Boots is known for her blend of electropop, synth-pop, and disco, with her music focusing on lyrical themes of love, heartbreak, and personal acceptance.

Originally from Blackpool, Little Boots moved to Los Angeles and began to produce music under the labels IAMSOUND and 679. In 2009, she released her debut studio album, Hands, featuring the single "Remedy" which reached number 6 on the UK Singles Chart. Her second studio album, Nocturnes (2013), topped both the Billboard's US Top Dance Albums and Heatseekers Albums. Starting in 2014, Little Boots began producing music under her own label, On Repeat Records. Her fourth studio album, Working Girl (2015), also topped the Billboard charts, with her lead single "Better in the Morning" receiving high praise.

Little Boots began to disappear from mainstream attention, starting in 2017. After the release of Working Girl, she began releasing several standalone singles and extended plays, which included collaborations with other artists. After a hiatus, Little Boots announced her fourth studio album, releasing the single "Silver Balloons" (2021) a few days later. Hesketh also stated that the album was entirely directed, produced, and written by herself. Her fourth studio album, Tomorrow's Yesterdays, was released in 2022.

Since beginning her solo career, Little Boots has released four studio albums, with Hands, Nocturnes, and Working Girl topping several charts. She has also released numerous singles, extended plays, and remixes. She is the recipient of numerous nominations from several music publications, including those from the BRIT Awards, NME Awards, and the UK Music Video Awards. In 2009, Little Boots was named the "most promising new music talent" by BBC, winning herself the Sound of... music award.

== Early life and education ==
Victoria Christina Hesketh was born in Blackpool, Lancashire, England, in 1983 or 1984. Her father operates a motor vehicle dealership, and her mother is a writer. Hesketh has three younger brothers, and was raised in Thornton, Lancashire.

From the age of five, Hesketh played the piano and began lessons at six with Ruth Birchall, eventually winning a music scholarship. During this time she was taught how to play the flute, was a member of the school choir and travelled regularly to Manchester to take lessons on her harp. Trained initially in classical singing by Janet Wunderley, by the age of thirteen Hesketh was writing her own songs.

Hesketh attended the private Rossall School in Fleetwood, and then the state Blackpool Sixth Form College; it was around this time that she entered the ITV talent competition search Pop Idol aged 16. Reaching the third round, she was eliminated by the producers of the show and did not reach the panel of judges.

After singing with the Lancashire Youth Jazz Orchestra and performing with a jazz trio for some time, Hesketh decided to prioritise her education and studied cultural studies at the University of Leeds, attaining a first-class honours degree. She subsidised her course by playing "awful, schmoozy lounge versions of Norah Jones songs" in hotels around the north-west. It was during her time at Leeds University that Hesketh, along with two of her fellow students, formed the all-female band Dead Disco, Hesketh herself eventually becoming the lead singer and keyboardist.

== Career ==
=== 2005–2008: Dead Disco ===
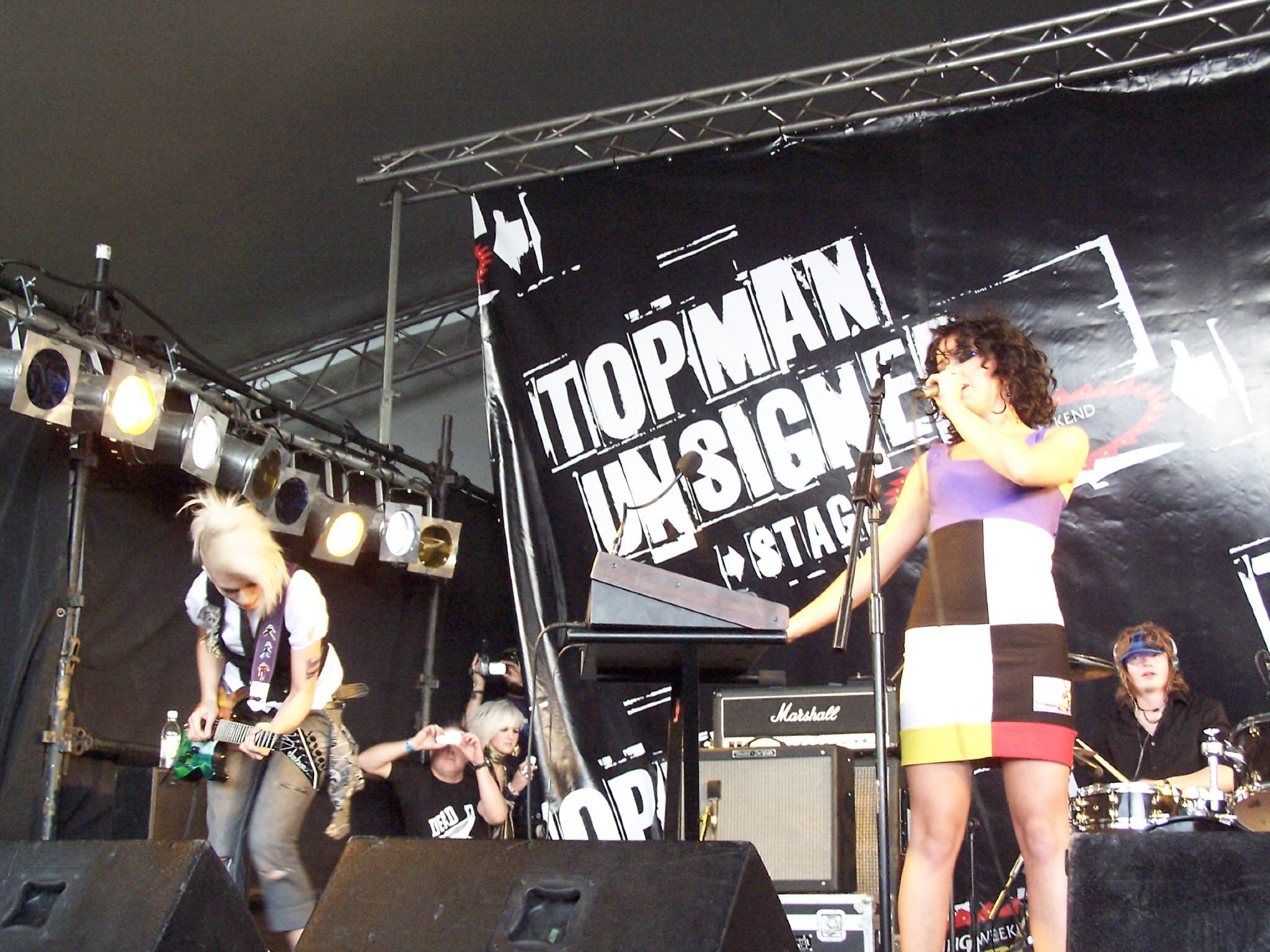
Dead Disco at the Leeds Festival in 2006

While studying at the University of Leeds, Hesketh answered an online advertisement posted by Lucy Catherwood and Marie France looking for a lead singer to start a band. Sharing an interest and love of The Killers, Ladytron, The Rapture and Siouxsie & the Banshees, they formed the electropunk band Dead Disco in August 2005, The band got their name through randomly picking words from a hat. With Dead Disco, Hesketh sang lead vocals and played synth, while Catherwood and Franceon played guitar and bass, respectively.

With only a few songs written, Dead Disco began playing gigs around the north of England; their live gig in the headline slot at the "In the City" event in Manchester gained them enough recognition to get a recording stint with James Ford. Working with Ford in his London attic studio, the band issued a limited release of their debut single "The Treatment" in April 2006 on the record label High Voltage. Their second release "City Place" was a digital-only release through Playlouder Records.

With the success of several sell out gigs and an appearance at the Leeds Festival, the band moved to Los Angeles to begin recording their debut album with Greg Kurstin. However, it was around this time that Hesketh herself began to write songs not in keeping with the band's "indie" style. Choosing a new musical direction, Hesketh left Dead Disco; they officially revealed their disbandment on their Myspace blog in December 2008. In an interview with The Times, Hesketh spoke about her gradual shift away from the band: "All the time I'd been hiding my own songs and finally I had to make the sort of music I actually wanted to listen to. [...] Before I used to always think, 'What would a jazz performer do?' or 'What would the band do?'—Now it's so easy because it's 'What would I do?' It's just me." In a later interview Hesketh noted that the bands' label was pressuring the group to have a certain style and that her bandmates lost confidence in her because she wanted to write "cheesy" songs.

=== 2008–2010: Mainstream success, Hands and Illuminations ===
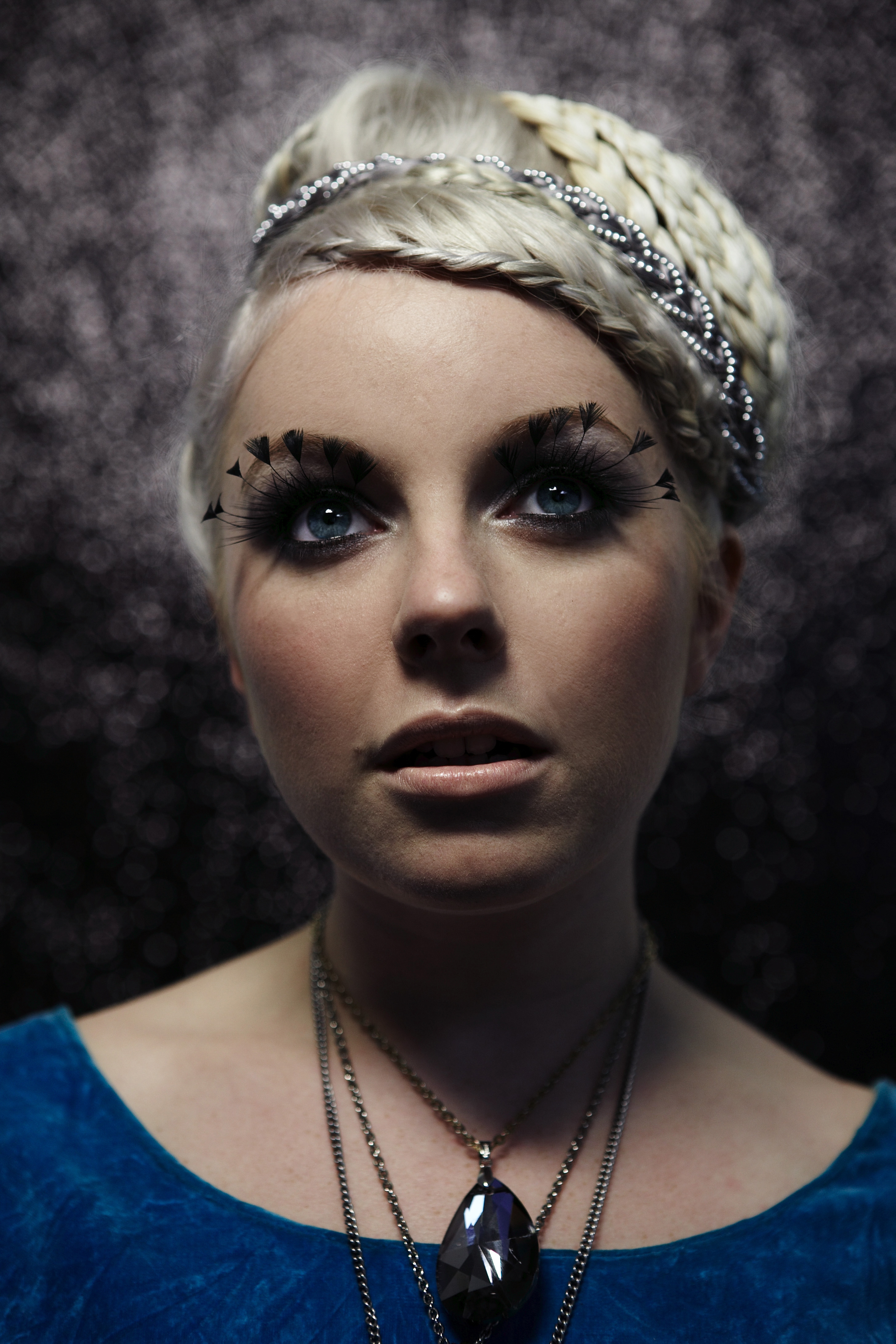
Little Boots in 2008

With her departure from Dead Disco in August 2007, Hesketh decided to begin a new solo career in pop. She returned to her parents' house to begin writing her own songs and posting covers on social networking sites such as YouTube and Myspace. Within a year she had narrowed down a list of her songs to create an album and by getting in touch with Greg Kurstin, with whom she had previously worked with Dead Disco, Hesketh started production on her debut album Hands. In early 2008 she began using the stage name Little Boots, which came from a nickname given to her by a friend, a reference to her unusually small feet. She shares her nickname with the ancient Roman emperor Gaius Caesar Augustus Germanicus, who was better known by his nickname Caligula (Latin for "Little Boot").

After appearing on several shows including Later... with Jools Holland and Last Call with Carson Daly, Hesketh entered production on her debut album Hands. The album was recorded in Los Angeles with Greg Kurstin and Joe Goddard, and by January 2009 she had begun to compile the album's track listings. With increasing media attention regarding her then-yet-to-be-released debut album, Hesketh topped the BBC Sound of 2009 poll and received a Critics' Choice nomination at the 2009 BRIT Awards.

Hands was released in June 2009, accompanied by a limited edition 12-inch vinyl release (limited to 1000 copies). The album peaked at number five on the UK Albums Chart and has produced the top twenty hit "New in Town" and top ten hit "Remedy". The album also did well in Europe and Japan. Also in June 2009, Little Boots released an EP titled Illuminations in the United States and Canada. It includes "Stuck on Repeat", "New in Town", "Magical", "Love Kills" (a cover of Freddie Mercury's 1984 song) and "Not Now" (which is only available on the US edition). Designed to help relaunch Elektra Records, the EP peaked at number fourteen on the Billboard Dance/Electronic Albums chart.

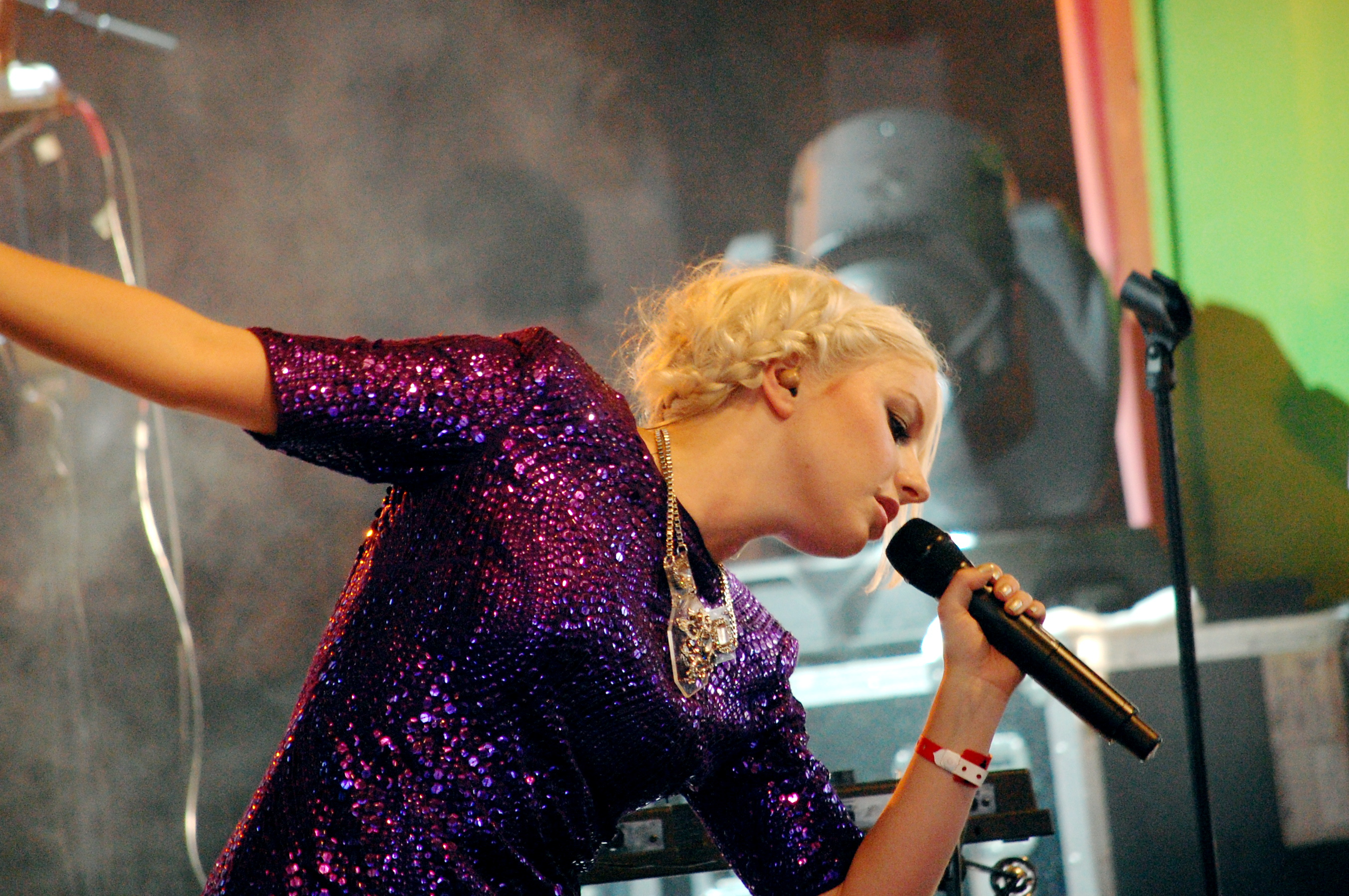
Little Boots performing at the Arvika Festival in 2009

Critical response to the album was generally favourable, generating a score of 70 on Metacritic. In a review for musicOMH, Michael Cragg called it "a well-crafted, glorious pop record." Clash Music reviewer Joe Zadeh disagreed, writing that the album "falls victim to attempts to reach beyond more boundaries than necessary, and thus ironically loses the concentration of the more earnest listener." David Renshaw of Gigwise.com described Hands as "a big pop album" that "rival[s] Lady Gaga, Girls Aloud or Lily Allen." Ben Thompson of The Guardian wrote that the album's production was "diverse" and called the song "Symmetry", a duet with Philip Oakey, a "joyous cross-generational head-to-head." NME reviewer Emily Mackay wrote that "Little Boots gives us an inspiring story of self-realization" and called the album "brilliant". Pete Paphides of The Times named "Stuck on Repeat" the album's "best moment" due to its "exquisite vulnerability". Little Boots was also nominated for Critics' Choice at the 2009 Brit Awards. She was included on Esquire magazine's list of sixty "Brilliant Brits 2009", and was named a 2009 artist to watch by American magazine Rolling Stone.

Little Boots collaborated with illustrator and artist Chrissie Abbott for the artwork of the album. The artwork for the album has been compared to Pink Floyd's 1973 album The Dark Side of the Moon because of its geometric design and fairytale imagery. The album was released in the United States on 2 March 2010, debuting at number seven on the Heatseekers Albums chart. With the release of her debut, she became linked to a recent wave of breakthrough female artists in their twenties playing 1980s-influenced music, including Lady Gaga, Ladyhawke, Florence and the Machine and Elly Jackson of La Roux.

=== 2010–2013: Nocturnes ===
In an interview with music website Artistdirect in March 2010, Little Boots stated that her second album would be "rawer and a bit more down-to-earth. It'll still be magical, but quite dark and spooky at the same time." She added that she had drawn inspiration from the poetry of Edgar Allan Poe. In May 2011, she performed at China Music Valley Music Festival in Beijing, during which she performed a new song called "Crescendo". In late September 2011, Little Boots performed several old and new songs acoustically at the Mondrian Hotel in Los Angeles. In October 2011, she released a mixtape called Shake Until Your Heart Breaks and announced that she would embark on an international DJ tour to promote her new material. She released the song "Shake" digitally and on a limited edition vinyl in November 2011. Little Boots collaborated with English electronic producer Michael Woods on the song "I Wish", which premiered during Woods's set on BBC Radio 1's Essential Mix on in December 2011.

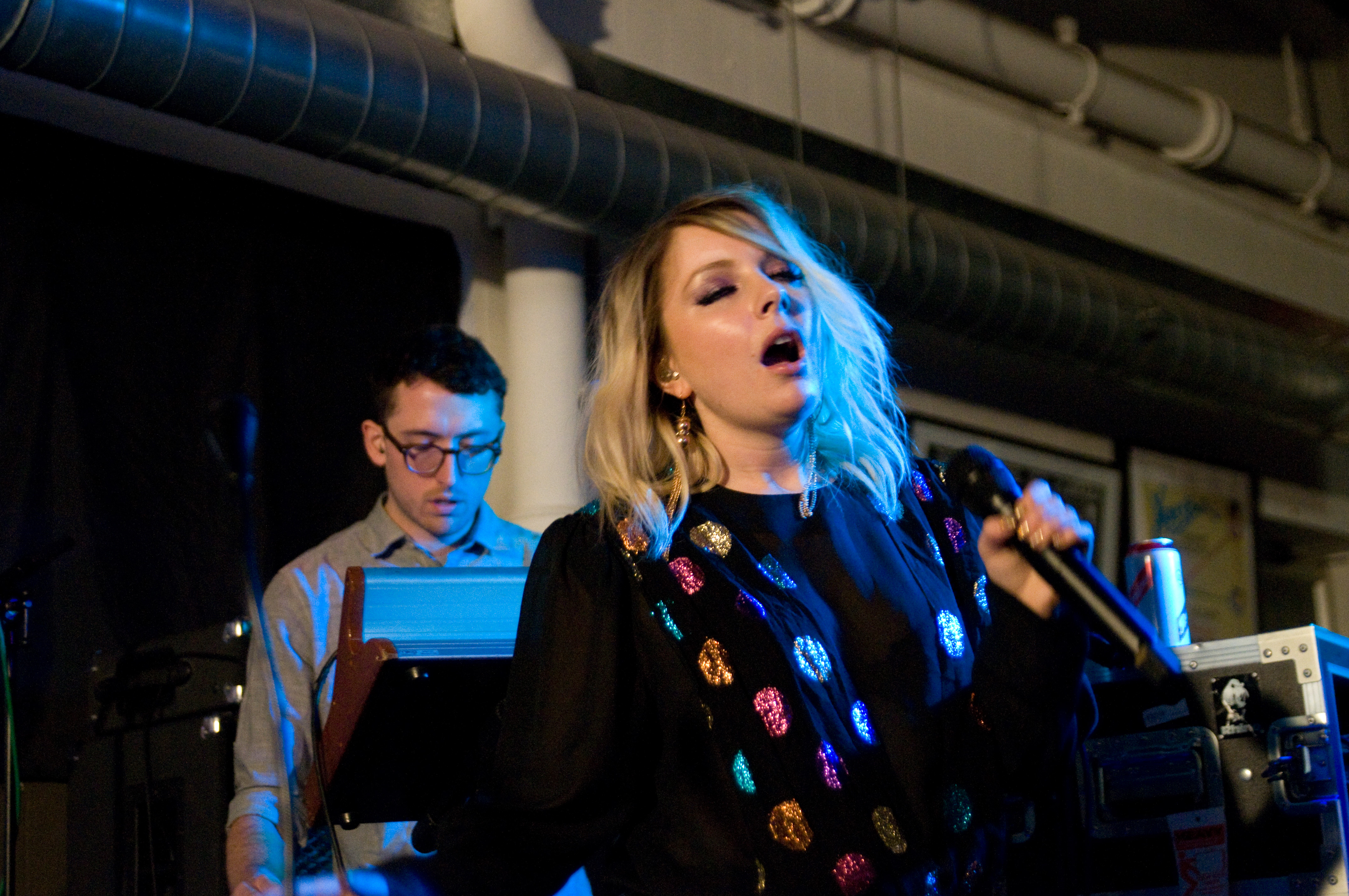
Little Boots at Rough Trade, May 2013

Little Boots unveiled her third mixtape, Into the Future, in March 2012 via her official SoundCloud page. The mix includes re-workings of Azari & III's "Reckless with Your Love" and Kylie Minogue's "Slow", and a Tensnake remix of "Every Night I Say a Prayer", a song she wrote with Andy Butler of Hercules and Love Affair. "Every Night I Say a Prayer" was released in April 2012 as a free digital download and—to coincide with Record Store Day—on limited 12-inch vinyl via 679 and Trax Records. She supported the launch with a short live set at Rough Trade East in London. This was followed by "Headphones", released in June 2012, with the accompanying music video inspired by Paris, Texas. Little Boots toured internationally in late 2012, including performances at San Francisco's Folsom Street Fair and Ibiza's Space.

In January 2013, Little Boots released two tracks on vinyl, "Superstitious Heart" and "Whatever Makes You Happy", under the pseudonym LB. Her second album, Nocturnes, was released in May 2013 and features the singles "Shake", "Every Night I Say a Prayer" and "Broken Record". In an interview with This Is Fake DIY, Little Boots said of the album: "I feel a lot more at peace about where I'm at creatively as an artist now than a year or so ago [...] I think everyone is always nervous releasing anything they've created into the world, but I've realised what I want to do and how I can achieve it, rather than trying to please other people." Sonically, she stated Nocturnes "definitely feels more representative of me of an artist, at least now in 2012. It's less 80s synth pop influenced, it's quite an upbeat album, which I think has stemmed from the fact I have been DJing a lot, and listening to a lot of dance music." She has also characterised the album as "still electronic but draws a lot more influences from early house music and classic disco."

=== 2014–2017: Business Pleasure, Working Girl and After Hours ===
Little Boots released her fifth EP, Business Pleasure, in December 2014. The lead single, "Taste It", premiered the preceding month. Her third studio album, Working Girl, was released in July 2015 via her own label, On Repeat Records. In August 2015 it was announced that she had collaborated with Jean-Michel Jarre on the track "If..!" from the album Electronica. The track was released as a single ahead of the release of the album with accompanying promotional video. A remix competition for the track was also announced on the Talenthouse website. In June 2016 Little Boots announced her sixth EP titled After Hours as a continuation of her Working Girl era. The lead single Staring at the Sun was released on worldwide on 3 June 2016 with the EP being released on 17 June 2016.

=== 2018–2019: EPs and 10th Anniversary reissue of Hands ===
Little Boots released her seventh EP Burn on 6 April 2018. The EP features 4 songs, all of which are collaborative efforts with female producers. The EP was preceded by single "Shadows". In September 2019, she announced a 10th-anniversary re-issue of Hands, accompanied by "Echoes", unreleased demos, rarities and B-sides. "'Echoes' was due to be a follow-up single after 'Hands'," she explained. "It was co-written with RedOne who I wrote 'Remedy' with, and who'd been working on a lot of the early Gaga stuff at the time. It's super pop and 80s and fans loved it when I played it live. Given it took on almost mythical status on fan forums I'm very happy to be able to finally share the song decades later."

In a November 2019 interview with The Guardian, Spice Girl Melanie C revealed she has been working with Little Boots on Chisholm's upcoming eighth studio album. That same year, she released her eighth extended play, Jump.

=== 2020–present: ABBA Voyage and Tomorrow's Yesterdays ===
After joining ABBA Voyage in 2021, Little Boots announced that she would be releasing her fourth studio album, and unveiled its lead single "Silver Balloons". Tomorrow's Yesterdays was released on 18 March 2022, seven years after Working Girl (2015). It was solely written and produced by herself.

== Musicianship and influences ==
As a musician, Little Boots sings and plays the piano, keyboards, synthesizer, Stylophone and a Japanese electronic instrument called the Tenori-on. She has a soprano vocal range.

Hesketh has cited The Human League, Pink Floyd, Britney Spears and Captain Beefheart as influences.

== Touring and performances ==
=== 2009 ===
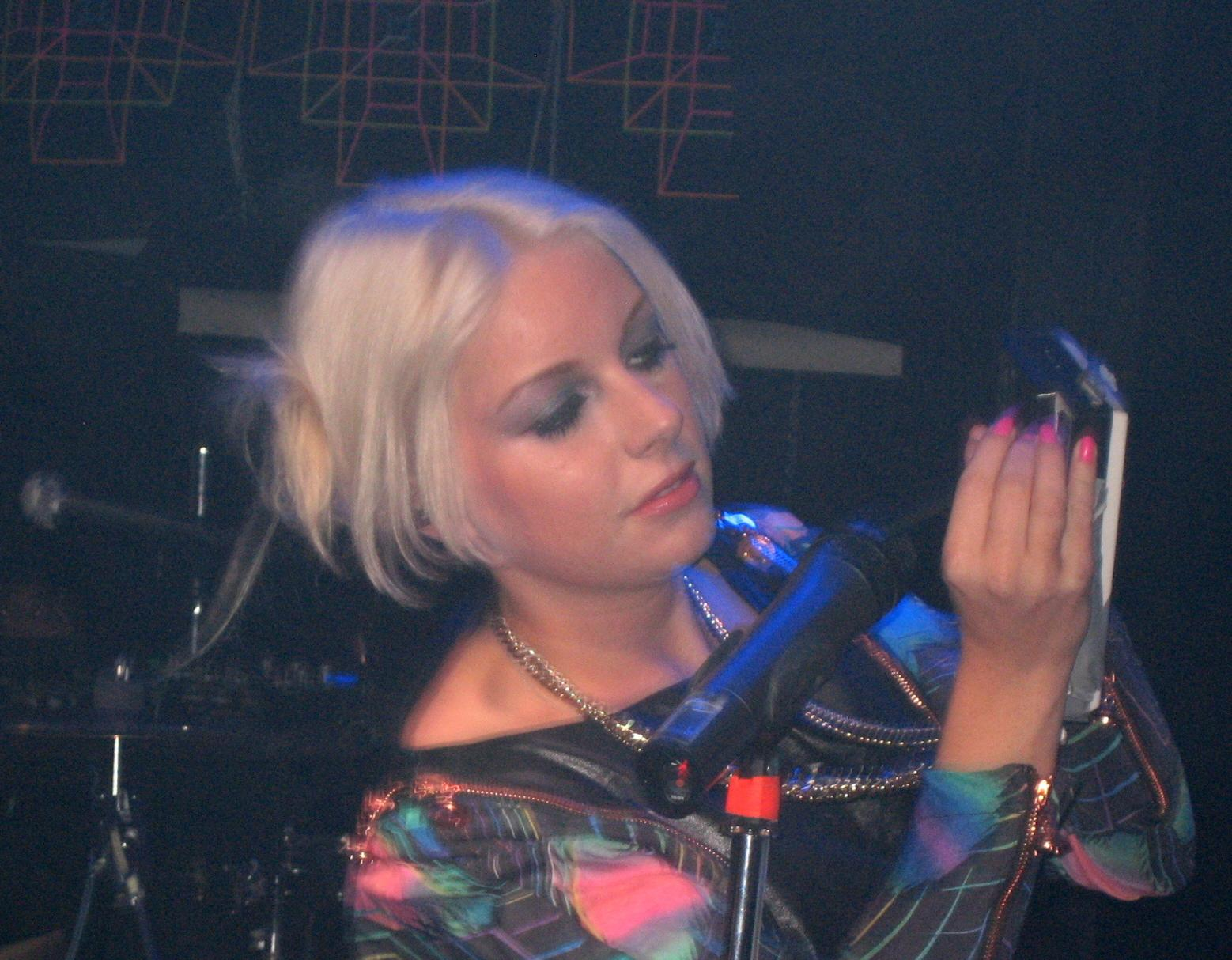
Little Boots performs on the Stylophone during her 2009 North American tour

Little Boots' first televised appearance was on Later... with Jools Holland on 7 November 2008. She was invited to perform on the show after posting songs on MySpace. On 4 March 2009, Little Boots appeared on late night television show Last Call with Carson Daly in the United States where she was interviewed by Daly and several clips from a Los Angeles nightclub performance were shown. Little Boots performed "Stuck on Repeat" using the Tenori-on on edition of 11 May 2009 of BBC Breakfast. She returned to Later... with Jools Holland on 15 May 2009. This was followed by an appearance on the BBC Radio 4 programme Woman's Hour on 27 May 2009. In 2009, the song "Meddle" was featured in an advertisement for Victoria's Secret. On 5 June 2009, she appeared on the Bebo music show Beat, performing "New in Town" live in the studio.

On 3 July 2009 Little Boots closed out Friday Night with Jonathan Ross. A week later, she performed at Oxegen 2009 on the Hot Press New Bands Stage, her first performance in Ireland. The following weekend she performed at T4 on the Beach 2009 on both the T4 and 4Music Stages.

Little Boots performed "Remedy" and a cover version of JLS' "Beat Again" as part of the Live Lounge segment of BBC Radio 1's The Jo Whiley Show on 19 August 2009. Later in the month, Little Boots performed at the Reading and Leeds Festivals on the Radio 1/NME Stage. Between those appearances, she also performed at Manchester Pride 2009, an LGBT pride event. In September 2009 she was scheduled to embark on a five-city North American tour to support the Illuminations EP. The following month she performed on the main stage at the Bestival 2009 in Downend, Isle of Wight.

Little Boots went on a five-city sold-out US tour in the autumn of 2009 in support of Illuminations. On 26 October 2009 Little Boots performed as the main act at 53 Degrees in Preston, Lancashire. Along with this, Little Boots revisited the Blackpool Sixth Form College to film a 360 Session for Channel 4. The college's media studies, music technology and college magazine all got to work with her and Sixth Sense, the college magazine, managed to get their second exclusive interview with Little Boots, which was published in January 2010. On 7 December Little Boots dueted with Gary Numan on the 6 Music Live Combos show, broadcast on 11 December.

=== 2010–2012 ===
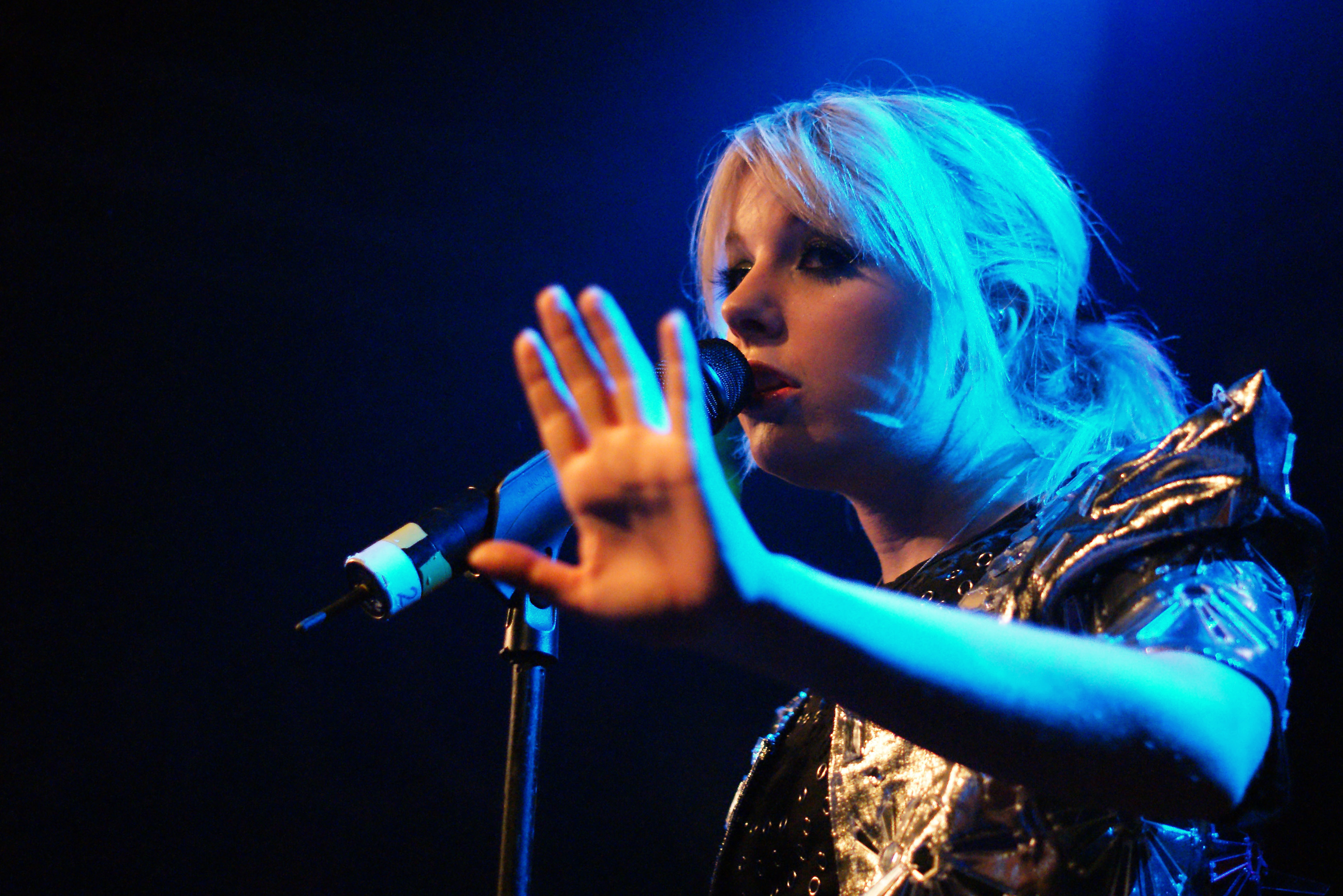
Little Boots performing in Seattle in 2010

On 2 March 2010, Little Boots was scheduled to embark on a thirteen-date North American tour to coincide with the release of Hands there. She toured without her laser harp because she was not a certified laser operator (which is a legal requirement in the US for certain laser appliances) and therefore she was not allowed to travel with the instrument. However, on 17 March, seven of the planned concerts were cancelled; Little Boots cited this was due to "unforeseen circumstances and commitments in the UK".

The following month, Little Boots performed a set in the Gobi Tent at the Coachella Valley Music and Arts Festival in Indio, California. She told the audience that much of her crew and costumes had been stranded in the UK due to the Icelandic volcano—which had forced some UK artists, such as Gary Numan and Bad Lieutenant, to cancel their Coachella engagements entirely—and that aspects of her set had to be improvised at the last minute. Two months later, Little Boots performed on the NewNowNext Awards show on the United States LGBT cable channel Logo.

In May, she performed a one-off show at London's XOYO on 5th. In the same month she was a support act for The Scissor Sisters London shows on 16 and 17. From October to November, she embarked on an international tour through Europe and South America performing in Madrid, Barcelona, Poland, Brazil and Chile. On 21 December, she uploaded a short feature on her official YouTube page, which showed behind the scenes footage of her touring in Brazil, Chile and Argentina.

=== 2022 ===
Little Boots announced in September 2021 that she has been chosen as one of ten musicians who would perform as a backup band for the ABBA Voyage concert using "ABBAtars", or digital avatars of the group, stating that she's "been a lifelong ABBA fan", calling the experience an "absolute honour".

== Other pursuits and appearances ==
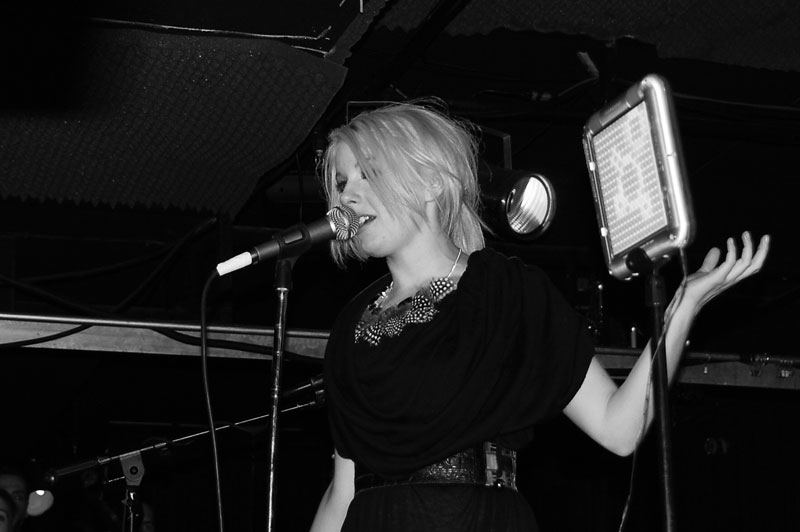
Little Boots at Studio B, Brooklyn, New York in 2009

Many of Little Boots' songs have been used on television and film. "New in Town" has appeared numerous times, including in the 2009 American horror film Jennifer's Body. "Remedy" was used in the Dollhouse episode entitled "Belle Chose". It was also used in a scene in the third series of Gavin & Stacey.

"Meddle" was featured in the ninth episode of the third series of the British teen drama Skins, titled "Katie and Emily" and broadcast 19 March 2009. It also appears in a Victoria's Secret commercial, along with appearing in the Channel 4 comedy series, Friday Night Dinner. The Hands track "Click" was used in the twentieth episode of The Vampire Diaries, "Blood Brothers", and in the sixteenth episode of Melrose Place, "Santa Fe", which aired on 30 March 2010.

Little Boots has contributed to a documentary about the Stylophone. She has also collaborated with RjDj and released a remix app for the iPhone titled The Little Boots – Reactive Remixer, which allows users to remix "Remedy", "Meddle" and "New in Town" and share it over social networking sites.

Boots has joined the War on Want campaign, part of which supports protests against child labour sweatshops in India.

== Personal life ==
Hesketh married Ben Mason. In May 2022, she gave birth to her first child: a son, Monty. In August 2024, she gave birth to her second son, Herbie.

In October 2025, Hesketh joined Bath Spa University to become a lecturer in Commercial Music.

== Activism ==
Little Boots is a vocal supporter of the gay community. She also donates and contributes to several anti-poverty charities. In 2010, Little Boots worked with the charity War on Want to fund against companies that exploited employees for unfair wages across India and the United Kingdom, calling the situation "awful for anyone who is not being paid minimum wage and [who] work their backsides off." Little Boots has cited herself as a feminist and highly supports the representation of leading women in the music industry.

== Awards and nominations ==
On 5 December 2008, Little Boots was nominated for BBC annual poll Sound of... and was later announced as the winner of Sound of 2009.

Year	Awards	Work	Category	Result
2008	Rober Awards Music Prize	Herself	Most Promising New Artist	Won
2008	Popjustice £20 Music Prize	"Stuck on Repeat"	Best British Pop Single	Nominated
2009	Popjustice £20 Music Prize	"New in Town"	Best British Pop Single	Nominated
2009	Brit Awards	Herself	Critics' Choice	Nominated
2009	NME Awards	Herself	Best Band Blog or Twitter	Nominated
2009	MTV Europe Music Awards	Herself	Best Push Act	Nominated
2009	UK Festival Awards	Herself	Best Breakthrough Act	Nominated
2009	Virgin Media Music Awards	Herself	Best Newcomer	Nominated
2009	Virgin Media Music Awards	Herself	Twit of the Year	Nominated
2010	International Dance Music Awards	Herself	Best Breakthrough Artist (Solo)	Won
2010	Meteor Music Awards	Herself	Best International Female	Nominated
2010	RTHK International Pop Poll Awards	Herself	Top New Act	Nominated
2010	RTHK International Pop Poll Awards	"New in Town"	Top Ten International Gold Songs	Nominated
2015	UK Music Video Awards	"Taste It"	Best Art Direction & Design	Nominated
2015	UK Music Video Awards	"Taste It"	Best Dance Video	Nominated

== Discography ==
Little Boots has released four studio albums, one live album, 10 extended plays, 10 mixtapes, 18 singles (including four as a featured artist), four promotional singles and 16 music videos. She also recorded four singles with her former band, Dead Disco.

Studio albums

- Hands (2009)
- Nocturnes (2013)
- Working Girl (2015)
- Tomorrow's Yesterdays (2022)
