= Dead Disco =

English electronic music band

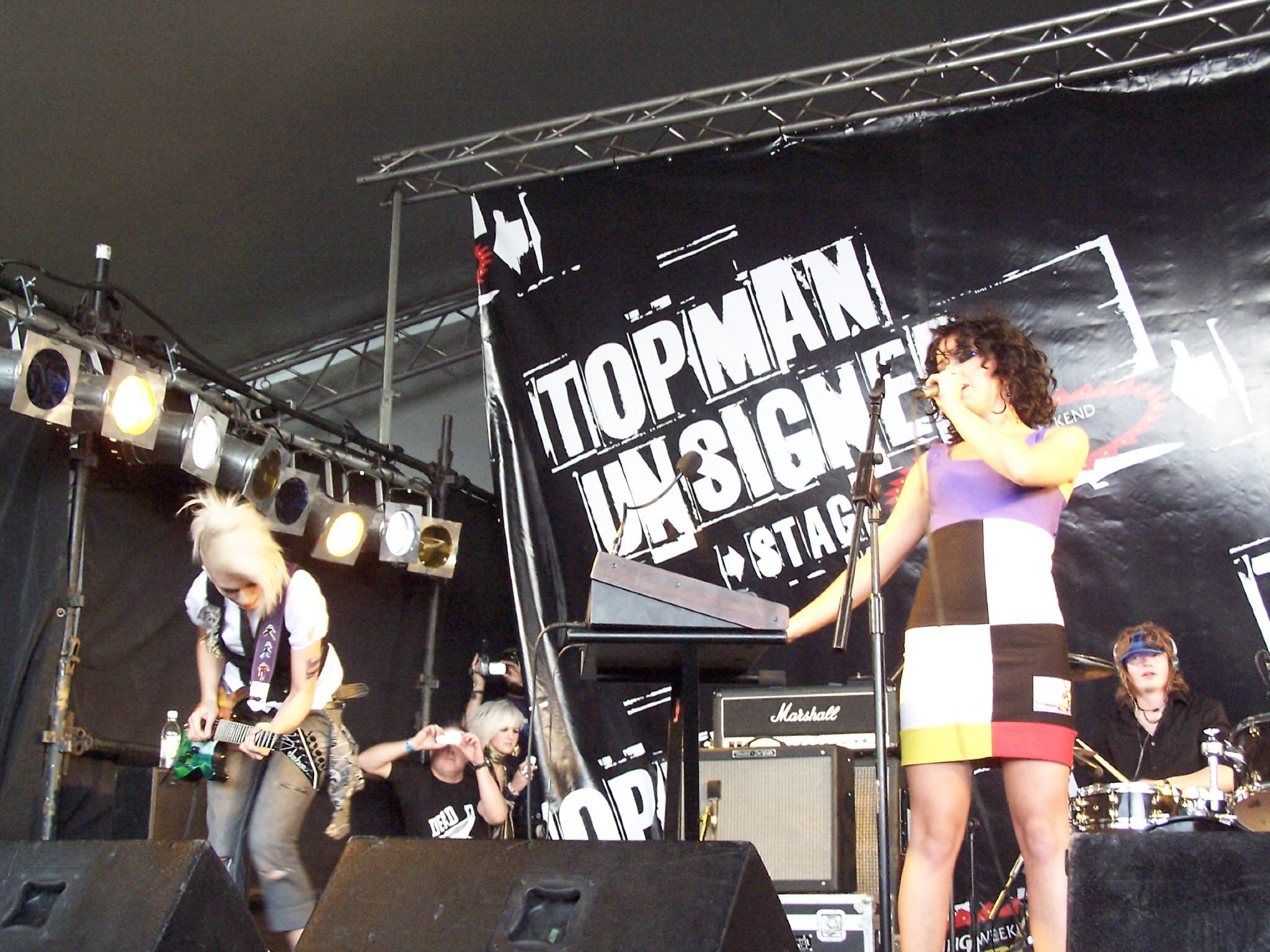
- Dead Disco performing at the Carling Leeds Festival 2006

Background information
- Origin: Leeds, Yorkshire, England
- Genres: Electronic rock; electropunk; new rave
- Years active: 2005–2008
- Labels: High Voltage; Play Louder; Fierce Panda; 679
- Past members: Lucy Catherwood; Marie France; Victoria Hesketh; Anna Prior; Louise Foody
- Website: www.myspace.com/deaddiscohq

Dead Disco were an English electronic music band from Leeds, Yorkshire, formed in 2005. The band consisted of Victoria Hesketh (vocals, synthesizer), Lucy Catherwood (guitar) and Marie France (bass).

== Career ==
The trio met in August 2005 at the University of Leeds. Hesketh answered an online advertisement posted by Lucy Catherwood and Marie France looking for a lead singer to start a band. They were influenced by such artists as the Bangles, Blondie, Siouxsie and the Banshees, Ladytron, the Killers, Billy Idol, Gang of Four, the Slits and the Rapture. The band got their name through randomly picking words from a hat.

With only a few songs written, Dead Disco began playing gigs around the north of England; their live gig in the headline slot at the "In the City" event in Manchester gained them enough recognition to get a recording stint with James Ford. Working with Ford in his London attic studio, the band issued a limited release of their debut single "The Treatment" in April 2006 on the record label High Voltage. Their second release "City Place" was a digital-only release through Playlouder Records. With the success of several sell out gigs and an appearance at the Leeds Festival, the band moved to Los Angeles to begin recording their debut album with Greg Kurstin. However, it was around this time that Hesketh herself began to write songs not in keeping with the band's "indie" style.

Choosing a new musical direction, Hesketh left Dead Disco; they officially revealed their disbandment on their Myspace blog in December 2008. In an interview with The Times, Hesketh spoke about her gradual shift away from the band: "All the time I'd been hiding my own songs and finally I had to make the sort of music I actually wanted to listen to. [...] Before I used to always think, 'What would a jazz performer do?' or 'What would the band do?'—Now it's so easy because it's 'What would I do?' It's just me." In a later interview Hesketh noted that the band's label was pressuring the group to have a certain style and that her bandmates lost confidence in her because she wanted to write "cheesy" songs.

== Releases ==
Dead Disco released four singles:

1. "The Treatment" (2005, High Voltage)
2. "City Place" (2006, Playlouder)
3. "Automatic" (2006, Fierce Panda)
4. "You're Out" (2007, 679)

For both "The Treatment" and "Automatic", Dead Disco teamed up with producer James Ford. "Automatic" was the final single to be released by label Fierce Panda. "You're Out" was produced by Greg Kurstin of the Bird and the Bee.

"City Place" was also included on the 2006 Dance to the Radio compilation What We All Want.

== Split ==
A Myspace post in December 2008 confirmed that the group had come to an end, and that the members were working on new projects: Hesketh as Little Boots; and Catherwood and France as Video Villain. Catherwood and France also founded clothing brand Art Disco which started originally whilst on tour with Dead Disco due to the high demand they had for their self designed merchandise.
