= New in Town (song) =

Single by Little Boots

from the album Hands
- B-side: "New in Town (No One Is Safe – Alex Kapranos Remix)"
- Released: 15 May 2009
- Recorded: Echo Studios (Los Angeles, California)
- Genre: Electropop
- Length: 3:19
- Label: 679; Atlantic
- Songwriters: Victoria Hesketh; Greg Kurstin
- Producer: Greg Kurstin

Little Boots singles chronology
"Meddle" (2008)	"New in Town" (2009)	"Remedy" (2009)

"New in Town" is a 2009 single by English recording artist Little Boots from her debut studio album, Hands (2009). Written by Little Boots and Greg Kurstin and produced by Kurstin, the track was released as the album's lead single on 25 May 2009 in the United Kingdom. The song was inspired by the nights Little Boots spent in Los Angeles recording the album.

"New in Town" received highly positive reviews from critics, who praised the song's writing, direction, and Hesketh's vocal performance. The song appeared in several end-of-the-year lists and peaked on multiple charts, including the UK Singles Chart where it debuted at number thirteen.

== Background and writing ==
"New in Town" was the first song composed by Little Boots and Greg Kustin in Los Angeles while recording songs for her debut album. According to Little Boots, the song is about "being a stranger in a strange place which is fun but also has a dark side, and someone showing you around and in the end just kind of letting go." While in Los Angeles, Little Boots felt isolated and lonely. She primarily drew inspiration for the track's lyrics from several strange individuals she met and the "seedy side of life" in the city. She chose to release the track as the album's lead single because "it's very bold and colourful and doesn't really sound like anything else out there."

== Release ==
In the United Kingdom, "New in Town" was added to the BBC Radio 1 C List on 23 April 2009. In May 2009, the song was added to the BBC Radio 1 A List.

The song appears on the official soundtrack to the 2009 American comedy horror film Jennifer's Body, as well as on the second episode of the second season of 90210 (which used the Fred Falke remix), the first episode of the fourth season of Friday Night Lights, the eighteenth episode of the fourth season of Ugly Betty and the twenty-second episode of Mercy. The song was also featured in the promo for the final season of The Hills.

== Critical reception ==
"New in Town" received generally positive reviews from music critics. In a review for Digital Spy, Nick Levine called the song an "electropop nugget" that "is sure to get us all stomping." Fraser McAlpine of the BBC Chart Blog opined that the song is "a little bit 'Take Me Out' by Franz Ferdinand and it's a little bit 'The World Should Revolve Around Me' by Little Jackie, only refracted through Booty's bassquake synthpop prism and suitably kaleidoscopic as a result." Michael Cragg of musicOMH deemed the song to be "a real grower" and compared it to Goldfrapp. Clash critic Joe Zadeh commented that the track "gathers energetic momentum and is delivered with the sassy nonchalance that made Santogold so intriguing." Gareth Grundy of The Observer disagrees, writing that the song will "work", but that "something's missing—her." Virgin Group gave "New in Town" a rave review, referring to it as "a fantastic electro synth-fused pop record, with the catchy-ness of any chart-topping dance floor classic with an edgy attitude to match", and also noted that "[w]hilst it may be more straightforward pop than some of her previous efforts it is nonetheless a very impressive effort and fairly unique in comparison to the current chart." K. Ross Hoffman of Allmusic praised the song's "brash and buzzy strut" and described it as "absolutely massive-sounding". Andrzej Lukowski of Drowned in Sound felt that the song "is just too perky, feeling both formulaic and calculating, its chorus combining a Radio 1-stupid hands-in-the-air sentiment." Giving the song a six out of ten rating, Pitchfork Media's Ryan Dombal stated that Little Boots "needs to chill on the chirp[y]" vocals.

== Commercial performance ==
"New in Town" debuted and peaked at number thirteen on the UK Singles Chart, where it spent thirteen non-consecutive weeks altogether in the top one hundred. The track debuted on the Irish Singles Chart at number seventeen, peaking at number sixteen two weeks later.

== Music video ==
The music video was directed by Jake Nava in April 2009. It was filmed in Los Angeles and features Little Boots and a group of dancers wandering and dancing under a highway overpass. The video begins with Little Boots driving around Los Angeles in the back of a car. She is then shown wandering around under a highway overpass in a blue dress and dancing with a group of homeless people. This is followed by scenes of rival gangs dancing and independent young couples making out in their cars.

== Track listings ==
- UK CD single
1. "New in Town" (Radio Edit) – 3:07
- UK 7" single

A1. "New in Town" – 3:29
B1. "New in Town" (No One Is Safe – Alex Kapranos Remix) – 5:22

- UK 12" single

A1. "New in Town" – 3:29
A2. "New in Town" (A1 Bassline Remix) – 5:25
B1. "New in Town" (The Golden Filter Remix) – 6:30
B2. "New in Town" (Den Haan Remix) – 5:14

- UK iTunes EP
1. "New in Town" (Bimbo Jones Remix) – 5:47
2. "New in Town" (Fred Falke Remix) – 7:28
3. "New in Town" (The Death Set Remix) – 2:10
4. "New in Town" (No One Is Safe – Alex Kapranos Remix) – 5:22
- US iTunes remix EP
1. "New in Town" (Bimbo Jones Remix) – 5:47
2. "New in Town" (Starsmith Remix) – 5:30
3. "New in Town" (Fred Falke Remix) – 7:28
4. "New in Town" (No One Is Safe – Alex Kapranos Remix) – 5:21

Official remixes

- "New in Town" (Fred Falke Instrumental) – 7:27
- "New in Town" (Bimbo Jones Edit) – 3:01
- "New in Town" (Semothy & Sheldrake Remix) – 4:06

== Charts ==
=== Weekly charts ===
Chart (2009)	Peak position
Australian Club Chart	35
Australian Hitseekers Singles Chart	10
Belgian Tip Chart (Flanders)	12
European Hot 100 Singles	42
Irish Singles Chart	16
Japan Hot 100	39
New Zealand Singles Chart	29
UK Singles Chart	13

=== Year-end charts ===
Chart (2009)	Peak position
UK Singles Chart	185

== Release history ==
Region	Date	Label	Format(s)
United Kingdom	15 May 2009	679 Recordings, Atlantic Records	Digital download
United Kingdom	25 May 2009	679 Recordings, Atlantic Records	CD single, 7" single, 12" single
United States	21 July 2009	Elektra Records	Digital download
