= 679 Artists =

Record label owned by Warner Music Group

679 Recordings
- Parent company: Warner Music Group
- Founder: Nick Worthington
- Distributor: Warner Music Group
- Country of origin: England
- Location: London, United Kingdom

679 Artists (formally known as Sixsevenine and 679 Recordings) was a Warner Music Group–owned record label based in London, England.

It was started by Nick Worthington who after leaving XL Recordings in 2001, started the company with Warner Music Group, and held the position of MD and A&R Director. It was named "679" as this was the address of the Pure Groove record shop on Holloway Road.

The label's first release was The Streets' debut, Original Pirate Material, released in March 2002. At the end of 2009 it was named best album of the 2000s by Observer Music Monthly.

The label released subsequent albums from various artists including Death From Above 1979, The Futureheads, Kano, King Creosote and Mystery Jets, and also included the million-selling second Streets album, A Grand Don't Come for Free.

The label was acquired by Warner Music Group in 2008.

In 2011, it released Plan B's The Defamation of Strickland Banks which has sold over one million copies.

The founder of 679 has recently formed a new record label called 37 Adventures.

== Former artists ==
- Annie
- Cut Off Your Hands
- Dead Disco
- Death from Above 1979
- The Earlies
- Fryars
- The Futureheads
- King Creosote
- Kano
- Little Boots
- Marina
- M. Craft
- MSTRKRFT
- Mystery Jets
- Oh My!
- Plan B
- The Polyphonic Spree
- The Rifles
- The Secret Handshake
- Secret Machines
- Spark
- The Stills
- The Streets
- The Webb Brothers
- Wideboys
