= The Knocks discography =

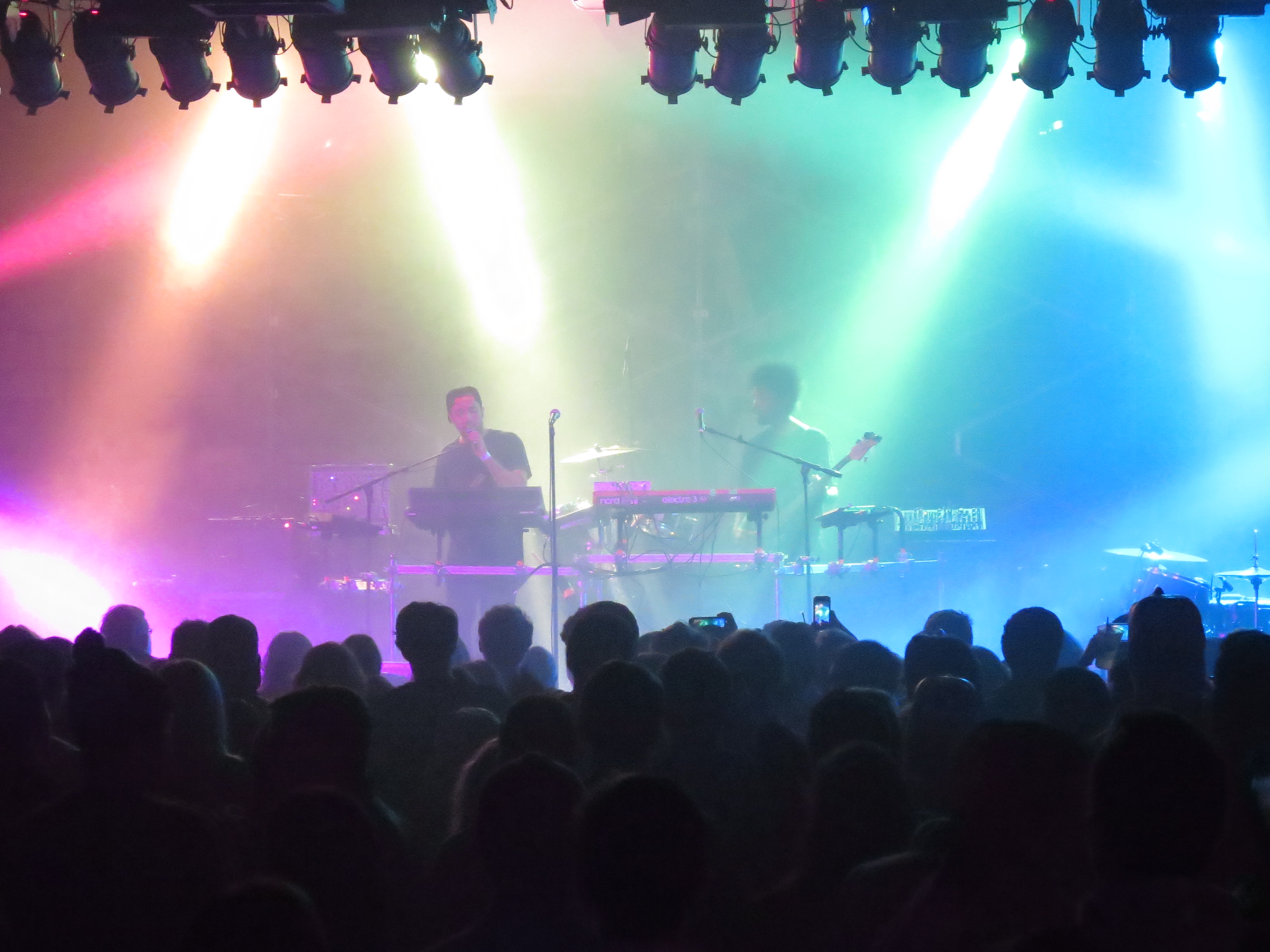
- The Knocks performing in Chicago in 2014
- Studio albums: 3
- EPs: 6
- Singles: 35
- Music videos: 16

American based electronic dance musicians the Knocks have released three studio albums, six EPs and thirty-five singles. The duo began their career as remixers in the city of New York, United States, eventually signing to their first ever major record label. Their 2010 single "Dancing with the DJ" was their first instant online success. Philadelphia hip hop band Chiddy Bang sampled the Knocks' "Blackout" for their single "Here We Go" (featuring Q-Tip) from their EP The Preview. Chiddy Bang subsequently sampled the Knocks' "When You've Got Music" and "Dancing with the DJ" for their mixtape Peanut Butter and Swelly. After the success of "Dancing with the DJ", their debut extended play, entitled Magic was released in 2011.

In 2012, their cover of "Midnight City" by M83 featuring vocals by Mandy Lee, had 10,000 downloads in its first week on the website SoundCloud. In June, the duo took the number one spot on the website HypeMachine with the track "Learn to Fly", which reached 100,000 plays on SoundCloud within a week of its release. "Geronimo", a collaboration with French producer Fred Falke, was released on Kitsuné Records in July 2012. Later on in November 2012, the duo were featured alongside pop sensation St Lucia in Icona Pop's song "Sun Goes Down", which was released on their debut album Icona Pop. It was later revealed that the song was the duo's very first feature and co-produced track.

Afterwards, the duo released another successful single, featuring St. Lucia, entitled "Modern Hearts", in the beginning of 2013 and earned the group another number-one placing on HypeMachine and reached the 100,000 plays mark on SoundCloud in four days. Within the same year, another single, entitled "Comfortable" featuring vocals from X Ambassadors, was released, which was the lead single of their second extended play, also titled Comfortable.

In 2014, the Knocks released a single on Neon Gold/Big Beat Records, "Classic", featuring alt-pop duo POWERS. An official video was released that paid homage to video game The Sims. After it was released, they released a "Powers Sunset Version" which followed shortly afterwards. This was followed with the songs "Dancing with Myself", "Collect My Love" featuring Alex Newell, and "Time" being released in early 2015. These tracks made up their third EP, entitled So Classic, which was released in April 2015. Throughout the rest of the year, the duo began working on their debut album, entitled 55, which featured collaborations from the likes of Fetty Wap, Cam'ron, Wyclef Jean, Carly Rae Jepsen, Matthew Koma, Magic Man, Alex Newell, POWERS, Phoebe Ryan, Justin Tranter, Walk the Moon, and X Ambassadors. Once released, there was a post-success for the duo, as songs from the album were promoted on advertisements and shows across the US, as well as producing musical material for other artists for the first time, including Carly Rae Jepsen and Wyclef Jean.

== Studio albums ==
List of studio albums, with selected chart positions
Title	Album details	Peak chart positions	
Title	Album details	US Heat	US Dance
55	Released: March 4, 2016; Label: Neon Gold, Big Beat; Format: CD, digital download, LP (limited)	9	4
New York Narcotic	Released: September 28, 2018; Label: Neon Gold, Big Beat; Format: CD, digital download, LP	—	—
History	Released: April 29, 2022; Label: Big Beat; Format: digital download	—	—
Revelation	Released: June 6, 2025; Label: Neon Gold; Format: CD, digital download, LP; Co-Written/Released with: Dragonette	—	—
"—" denotes an album that did not chart or was not released.

== Extended plays ==
Title	EP details	Peak chart positions
Title	EP details	US Dance
Magic	Released: November 21, 2011; Label: A&M/Octone Records; Format: Digital download; Track listing: 1. "Magic" (featuring Gary Go); 2. "R. O. Y. L. (Rest of Your Life)"; 3. "Brightside"; 4. "The Prize"; 5. "All We Got" (featuring Kardinal Offishall); 6. "Dancing with the DJ"	—
Comfortable	Released: February 11, 2014; Label: Neon Gold; Format: Digital download, EP; Track listing: 1. "Comfortable" (featuring X Ambassadors); 2. "The One" (featuring Sneaky Sound System); 3. "Dreaming"; 4. "Savior" (featuring Ra Ra Riot)	25
So Classic	Released: May 28, 2015; Label: Neon Gold, Big Beat; Format: Digital download; Track listing: 1. "Dancing With Myself"; 2. "Time"; 3. "Collect My Love" (featuring Alex Newell); 4. "Classic" (featuring POWERS); 5. "Classic" (Powers Sunset Version) (featuring POWERS)	—
55.5 (The Knocks VIP Mix)	Released: July 8, 2016; Label: Neon Gold, Big Beat; Format: Digital download	—
Testify	Released: February 3, 2017; Label: Neon Gold, Big Beat; Format: Digital download	—
"—" denotes an album that did not chart or was not released.

== Mixtapes ==
Title	Details
Melody & Silence (with Foster the People)	Released: March 19, 2021; Label: Big Beat; Format: Digital download

== Singles ==
=== As lead artist ===
List of singles as lead artist, with selected chart positions and certifications, showing year released and album name
Title	Year	Peak chart positions						Certifications	Album
Title	Year	US Alt	US Dance	US Rock Air.	CAN Rock	RUS	NZ	Certifications	Album
"Blackout"	2010	—	—	—	—	—	—		Non-album single
"Make It Better"	2010	—	—	—	—	—	—		Magic EP
"Dancing with the DJ"	2010	—	—	—	—	—	—		Magic EP
"Brightside"	2011	—	—	—	—	—	—		Magic EP
"Midnight City" (M83 cover) (featuring Mandy Lee)	2012	—	—	—	—	—	—		Non-album single
"Geronimo" (with Fred Falke)	2012	—	—	—	—	—	—		Non-album single
"The Feeling"	2012	—	— (Note: "The Feeling" did not enter the Hot Dance/Electronic Songs chart, but peaked at number 30 on the Dance Club Songs chart.)	—	—	—	—		Non-album single
"Modern Hearts" (featuring St. Lucia)	2013	—	—	—	—	—	—		Non-album single
"Comfortable" (featuring X Ambassadors)	2014	—	—	—	—	—	—		Comfortable EP
"DYWT" (with Treasure Fingers)	2014	—	—	—	—	—	—		Non-album single
"Classic" (featuring Powers)	2014	—	—	—	—	—	19		55
"Dancing with Myself"	2015	—	—	—	—	—	—		55
"Collect My Love" (featuring Alex Newell)	2015	—	—	—	—	—	—		55
"I Wish (My Taylor Swift)" (with Matthew Koma)	2015	—	—	—	—	—	—		55
"New York City" (featuring Cam'ron)	2015	—	—	—	—	—	—		55
"Kiss the Sky" (featuring Wyclef Jean)	2016	—	—	—	—	—	—		55
"Classic" (featuring POWERS)	2016	—	—	—	—	—	—	RIAA: Gold	55.5 (The Knocks VIP Mix)
"Love Me Like That" (featuring Carly Rae Jepsen)	2016	—	—	—	—	—	—		55.5 (The Knocks VIP Mix)
"Heat" (featuring Sam Nelson Harris)	2016	—	—	—	—	—	—		Testify EP
"Trouble" (featuring Absofacto)	2017	—	—	—	—	—	—		Testify EP
"Lie" (featuring Jerm)	2017	—	—	—	—	—	—		Testify EP
"House Party" (with Captain Cuts)	2017	—	—	—	—	—	—		Non-album single
"Ride or Die" (featuring Foster the People)	2018	16	20	27	—	86	—	RIAA: Gold	New York Narcotic
"Shades"	2018	—	—	—	—	—	—		New York Narcotic
"Goodbyes" (featuring Method Man)	2018	—	—	—	—	—	—		New York Narcotic
"Brazilian Soul" (featuring Sofi Tukker)	2018	—	—	—	—	—	—		New York Narcotic
"Awa Ni" (featuring Kah-Lo)	2019	—	—	—	—	—	—		Non-album singles
"Summer Luv" (with Whethan featuring Crystal Fighters)	2019	—	—	—	—	—	—		Non-album singles
"Exit Sign" (featuring Gallant)	2019	—	—	—	—	—	—		Non-album singles
"Lucky Me" (featuring Great Good Fine Ok)	2019	—	—	—	—	—	—		Non-album singles
"Get Happy" (featuring Mat Zo)	2020	—	—	—	—	—	—		Non-album singles
"One Fine Day" (with Idris Elba featuring Mat Zo)	2020	—	— (Note: "One Fine Day" did not enter the Hot Dance/Electronic Songs chart, but peaked at number 20 on the Dance/Electronic Digital Song Sales chart.)	—	—	—	—		Non-album singles
"Bodies" (with Muna)	2020	—	—	—	—	—	—		History
"All About You" (featuring Foster the People)	2020	17	20	33	38	—	—		History
"R U High" (featuring Mallrat)	2021	—	—	—	—	—	—		History
"Sound the Alarm" (featuring Rivers Cuomo and Royal & the Serpent)	2021	—	29	—	—	—	—		History
"Bedroom Eyes" (featuring Studio Killers)	2021	—	—	—	—	—	—		History
"River" (featuring Parson James)	2021	—	—	—	—	—	—		History
"Walking on Water" (featuring Totally Enormous Extinct Dinosaurs)	2022	—	—	—	—	—	—		History
"Slow Song" (with Dragonette)	2022	—	36	—	—	—	—		History
"One on One" (with Sofi Tukker)	2023	—	—	—	—	—	—		Non-album single
"—" denotes a single that did not chart or was not released.

=== As featured artist ===
List of singles as featured artist, with selected chart positions and certifications, showing year released and album name
Title	Year	Peak chart positions										Certifications	Album
Title	Year	US	US Dance	BEL (FL)	BEL (WA)	CAN	GER	HUN	POL	ITA	JPN	Certifications	Album
"Sun Goes Down" (Icona Pop featuring The Knocks and St. Lucia)	2012	—	—	—	—	—	—	—	—	—	—		Icona Pop
"We Got U" (Lemaitre featuring The Knocks)	2016	—	—	—	—	—	—	—	—	—	—		Chapter One
"What Happened to Love" (Wyclef Jean featuring LunchMoney Lewis and The Knocks)	2017	—	—	—	—	—	—	—	—	—	—		Carnival III: The Fall and Rise of a Refugee
"Best Friend" (Sofi Tukker featuring NERVO, The Knocks and Alisa Ueno)	2017	81	5	10	— (Note: "Best Friend" did not enter the Wallonie Ultratop 50, but peaked at number one on the Ultratip chart.)	61	—	13	—	—	81	MC: Platinum; RIAA: Gold	Treehouse
"Fireworks" (Purple Disco Machine featuring Moss Kena and The Knocks)	2021	—	35	36	15	—	32	26	5	42	—	FIMI: Platinum; ZPAV: Gold; IFPI AUT: Gold	Exotica
"Love Letter" (Odesza featuring The Knocks)	2022	—	21	—	—	—	—	—	—	—	—		The Last Goodbye
"—" denotes a single that did not chart or was not released.

=== Promotional singles ===
Title	Year	Album
"Time"	2015	55
"Classic" (featuring Fetty Wap and Powers)	2015	55
"Best for Last" (featuring WALK THE MOON)	2016	55
"Love Me Like That" (featuring Carly Rae Jepsen)	2016	55
"Tied to You" (featuring Justin Tranter)	2016	55.5 (The Knocks VIP Mix)
"Best for Last" (featuring Walk the Moon)	2016	55.5 (The Knocks VIP Mix)
"Time"	2016	55.5 (The Knocks VIP Mix)
"Star Design"	2020	At Home with the Kids

== Guest appearances ==
List of non-single guest appearances, with other performing artists, showing year released and album name
Title	Year	Other artist(s)	Album
"When You've Got Music"	2011	Chiddy Bang	Peanut Butter and Swelly
"Get Down 2 Get Up"	2014	Mat Zo	The Up Down Left Right EP
"Endless"	2020	Shallou	Magical Thinking
"Sunshine"	2020	Whethan	Fantasy
"Spaceship"	2021	Kah-Lo	The Arrival - EP
"People"	2022	Kungs	Club Azur

== Songwriting and production credits ==
Year	Artist	Song	Album	Member(s)
2008	Sheek Louch	"Think We Got a Problem" feat. Bun B and The Game	Silverback Gorilla	Ben Ruttner
2008	JR Writer	"Killer Crack"	Politics and Bulls**t	Ben Ruttner
2010	The White Tie Affair	"You Look Better When I'm Drunk"	Non-album single	Ben Ruttner, James Patterson
2010	Chiddy Bang	"Here We Go" feat. Q-Tip	The Preview EP	Ben Ruttner, James Patterson
2011	Stephen Jerzak	"Party Like You're Single"	Miles and Miles	Ben Ruttner, James Patterson
2012	Chairlift	"I Belong in Your Arms"	Something	Ben Ruttner, James Patterson
2012	Bambu	"Bronze Watch"	BLK GLD	Ben Ruttner
2013	Little Boots	"Headphones"	Non-album single	Ben Ruttner, James Patterson
2013	Porter Ray	"Blackberry Kush"	One Rifle Per Family	Ben Ruttner
2014	Kevin Gates	"Again"	By Any Means	Ben Ruttner, James Patterson
2014	Divine	"Where the Club At"	Ghetto Rhymin'	James Patterson
2014	Divine	"Locked in the Stars"	Ghetto Rhymin'	James Patterson
2016	Wyclef Jean	"My Girl" feat. Sasha Mari	Non-album single	Ben Ruttner, James Patterson
2016	Wyclef Jean	"I Swear" feat. Young Thug	J'ouvert (EP)	James Patterson
2017	Wyclef Jean	"Thank God for the Culture" feat. Marx Solvila, J'Mika and Leon Lacey	Carnival III: The Fall and Rise of a Refugee	James Patterson
2017	The Sound of Arrows	"Stay Free"	Stay Free	Ben Ruttner, James Patterson
2018	Sofi Tukker	"Baby I'm a Queen"	Treehouse	James Patterson
2018	Matt and Kim	"Happy if You're Happy"	Almost Everyday	Ben Ruttner, James Patterson
2018	Lil Wop	"Dark Luv"	Wopavelli 4	James Patterson
2018	TVXQ	"Sooner or Later" feat. The Quiett	New Chapter No. 2: The Truth of Love	Ben Ruttner, James Patterson
2019	Blu DeTiger	"In My Head"	Non-album single	Ben Ruttner, James Patterson
2019	Blu DeTiger	"Mad Love"	Non-album single	Ben Ruttner, James Patterson
2019	Carly Rae Jepsen	"Julien"	Dedicated	Ben Ruttner
2019	Blu DeTiger	"Tangerine"	Non-album single	Ben Ruttner, James Patterson
2020	Beau	"Dance with Me"	Non-album single	Ben Ruttner
2021	Hugel	"4 to the Floor" with Stefy De Cicco and Hugo Cantarra	Non-album single	Ben Ruttner
2021	Maeta	"Habits"	Habits	James Patterson
2021	Betta Lemme	"I'm Good"	Ready for the Weekend EP	Ben Ruttner
2022	Juliana Madrid	"Madonna"	Juliana Madrid - EP	Ben Ruttner
2022	Juliana Madrid	"Peppermint"	Juliana Madrid - EP	Ben Ruttner
2022	Juliana Madrid	"Astronaut"	Juliana Madrid - EP	Ben Ruttner
2022	Juliana Madrid	"Savior"	Juliana Madrid - EP	Ben Ruttner
2022	Juliana Madrid	"Clover"	Juliana Madrid - EP	Ben Ruttner
2022	Juliana Madrid	"Soak"	Juliana Madrid - EP	Ben Ruttner
2022	Juliana Madrid	"Pretend"	Juliana Madrid - EP	Ben Ruttner
2022	Totally Enormous Extinct Dinosaurs	"Be With You"	When the Lights Go	Ben Ruttner

== Remixes ==
- The 1975 - "Girls"
- Carly Rae Jepsen – "All That"
- Passion Pit - "Sleepy Head"
- Dragonette – "Let It Go"
- St. Lucia - "Elevate"
- Ellie Goulding – "Starry Eyed"
- Foster the People – "Pumped Up Kicks"
- Nonono - "Pumpin Blood"
- Goldroom – "Only You Can Show Me"
- Wale and Lady Gaga - "Chillin"
- Grouplove – "Ways to Go"
- Haim – "Forever"
- Haim – "If I Could Change Your Mind"
- Katy Perry – "I Kissed a Girl"
- Louis The Child – It's Strange (ft. K.Flay)
- Monsieur Adi feat A*M*E – "What's Going On"
- Of Monsters & Men – "Little Talks"
- Santigold – "The Keepers"
- Future Islands - "Haunted By You"
- Skrillex and Diplo (or Jack Ü) – Where Are Ü Now (with Justin Bieber)
- Post Malone - "White Iverson"
- Taylor Swift – "Welcome to New York"
- X Ambassadors - "Renegades"
- Tegan & Sara – "Closer"
- The Sound of Arrows – "Wonders"
- Two Door Cinema Club – "Sleep Alone"
- Youngblood Hawke – "We Come Running"
- The 1975 – "Girls"
- Tove Lo – "Not On Drugs"
- Sofi Tukker – "Drinkee"
- Phoebe Ryan – "Chronic"
- Justin Bieber – "Company"
- Tove Lo - "Cool Girl"
- Charli XCX and Troye Sivan - "1999"
- Odesza - "Falls"
- Blu DeTiger - "In My Head" (The Knocks Block Party Mix)
- Absofacto - "Dissolve"
- Milck - "If I Ruled The World"
