= The Carnival Tour (Wyclef Jean) =

2018 concert tour by Wyclef Jean

- Tour by Wyclef Jean
- Associated albums: Carnival III: The Fall and Rise of a Refugee and J'ouvert
- Start date: February 9, 2018
- End date: October 26, 2018
- Legs: 2
- No. of shows: 56

Wyclef Jean concert chronology
- "From the Hut, to the Projects, to the Mansion World Tour" (2010-11); "The Carnival Tour" (2018)

The Carnival Tour was a U.S./Mexico concert tour by Haitian hip-hop musician Wyclef Jean. The tour began on February 9, 2018 and ended on October 26, 2018. The Tour was announced on December 25, 2017 on Wyclef's social media accounts

== Background ==
The tour is in support of Wyclef's seventh studio album Carnival III: The Fall and Rise of a Refugee. The tour will feature other artists such as Beards, Victory Soul Orchestra, The Age, DJ Trumpmastr, and The Knocks. In four of Wyclef's shows, a full orchestra will be featured just as it did at his show at Carnegie Hall in 1998. On December 25, 2017, he announced that he would be teaming up with Live Nation Entertainment Company to feature a full orchestra in Omaha, Columbus, St. Louis, and Dallas. The four shows will each be considered a leg and be called "A Night of Symphonic Hip Hop," and will feature some of the Philadelphia Orchestra. Wyclef has already announced that at these shows he will perform his hit solo song "Gone till November," and his hit song with the Fugees "Killing Me Softly with His Song."

== Shows ==
List of concerts, showing date, city, country, venue, opening acts, tickets sold, and number of available tickets

Date	City	Country	Venue	Opening act(s)	Attendance
North America Leg 1
February 9, 2018	Montclair	United States	Wellmont Theater		TBD/ 2,555
February 16, 2018	Cincinnati	United States	OTR Live		
February 17, 2018	Columbus	United States	Ohio Theatre	Philadelphia Orchestra	TBD/ 3,000
February 18, 2018	St. Petersburg	United States	Jannus Live	Roots of Creation Grateful Dub	TBD/ 2,000
February 23, 2018	Harrisburg	United States	Sunoco Performance Theater		
March 1, 2018	Boston	United States	Wilbur Theatre		TBD/ 1,093
March 2, 2018	Saratoga Springs	United States	Putnam Place	The Age DJ Trumpmastr Victory Soul Orchestra The Beards	TBD
March 3, 2018	Providence	United States	Fete Music Hall		TBD
March 6, 2018	Iowa City	United States	Englert Theater		TBD
March 9, 2018	St. Louis	United States	Power Hall	Philadelphia Orchestra	TBD
March 10, 2018	Jacksonville	United States	Daily's Place		TBD
March 11, 2018	Emporia	United States	Granada Theater		TBD
March 14, 2018	Denver	United States	Summit Music Hall	The Knocks	TBD
March 17, 2018	Orlando	United States	Central Florida Fairgrounds		TBD
March 19, 2018	Boise	United States	Knitting Factory	Culture Crew	TBD
March 21, 2018	Salt Lake City	United States	Metro Music Hall	DJ Juggy	TBD
March 23, 2018	San Francisco	United States	1015 Folsom		TBD
March 24, 2018	Los Angeles	United States	Regent Theater		TBD
March 25, 2018	Scottsdale	United States	BLK Live		TBD
March 26, 2018	Cabo San Lucas	Mexico	O Club		TBD
March 28, 2018	Redway	United States	Mateel Community Center		TBD
March 29, 2018	Davie	United States	Broward College	Irie Walshy Fire	TBD
March 31, 2018	Ardmore	United States	Ardmore Music Hall		TBD
April 6, 2018	Tucson	United States	Rialto Theater		TBD
April 7, 2018	Albuquerque	United States	El Rey Theater		TBD
April 8, 2018	Cincinnati	United States	OTR Live		TBD
April 11, 2018	Urbana	United States	Canopy Club		TBD
April 12, 2018	Eau Claire	United States	The Metro	Irie Soul	TBD
April 13, 2018	Minneapolis	United States	The Pourhouse		TBD
April 15, 2018	Chicago	United States	The Metro		TBD
April 19, 2018	Port Chester	United States	Capitol Theater		TBD
April 20, 2018	San Diego	United States	Embarcadero Marina Park		TBD
April 21, 2018	Seattle	United States	Showbox Market		TBD
April 22, 2018	Portland	United States	Wonder Ballroom		TBD
April 27, 2018	Stuart	United States	Downtown		TBD
April 28, 2018	Asbury Park	United States	The Stone Pony		TBD
May 2, 2018	Dallas	United States	Margot and Bill Winspear Opera House		TBD/ 4,300
Leg 2
June 15, 2018	Mount Clemens	United States	Emerald Theater		
June 22, 2018	Revere	United States	Wonderland Ballroom		
June 23, 2018	Portland	United States	Aura		
June 24, 2018	Hampton	United States	Bernie's Beach Bar		
June 30, 2018	Pointe-Calumet	Canada	Beach Club		
July 13, 2018	Providence	United States	Fete Music		
July 27, 2018	Albuquerque	United States	El Rey Theater		
July 28, 2018	Atlantic City	United States	Harrah's Atlantic City		
August 3, 2018	Chicoutimi	Canada	Racine Street		
August 17, 2018	Baltimore	United States	Power Plant Live	Edjacated Phools	
August 24, 2018	Kansas City	United States	Crossroads KC		
August 25, 2018	The Colony	United States	Lava Cantina		
August 31, 2018	Pelham	United States	The Caverns		
September 6, 2018	New York City	United States	Sony Hall		
September 7, 2018	Washington, D.C.	United States	Howard Theater		
September 14, 2018	Revere	United States	Wonderland Ballroom		
September 15, 2018	Saratoga Springs	United States	Putnam Place		
October 16, 2018	Newark	United States	NJPAC		
October 26, 2018	Providence	United States	Fete Music		
