= When the Night =

When the Night may refer to:

- When the Night (film), a 2011 Italian drama film
- When the Night (album), a 2013 album by St. Lucia
