= Moss Kena =

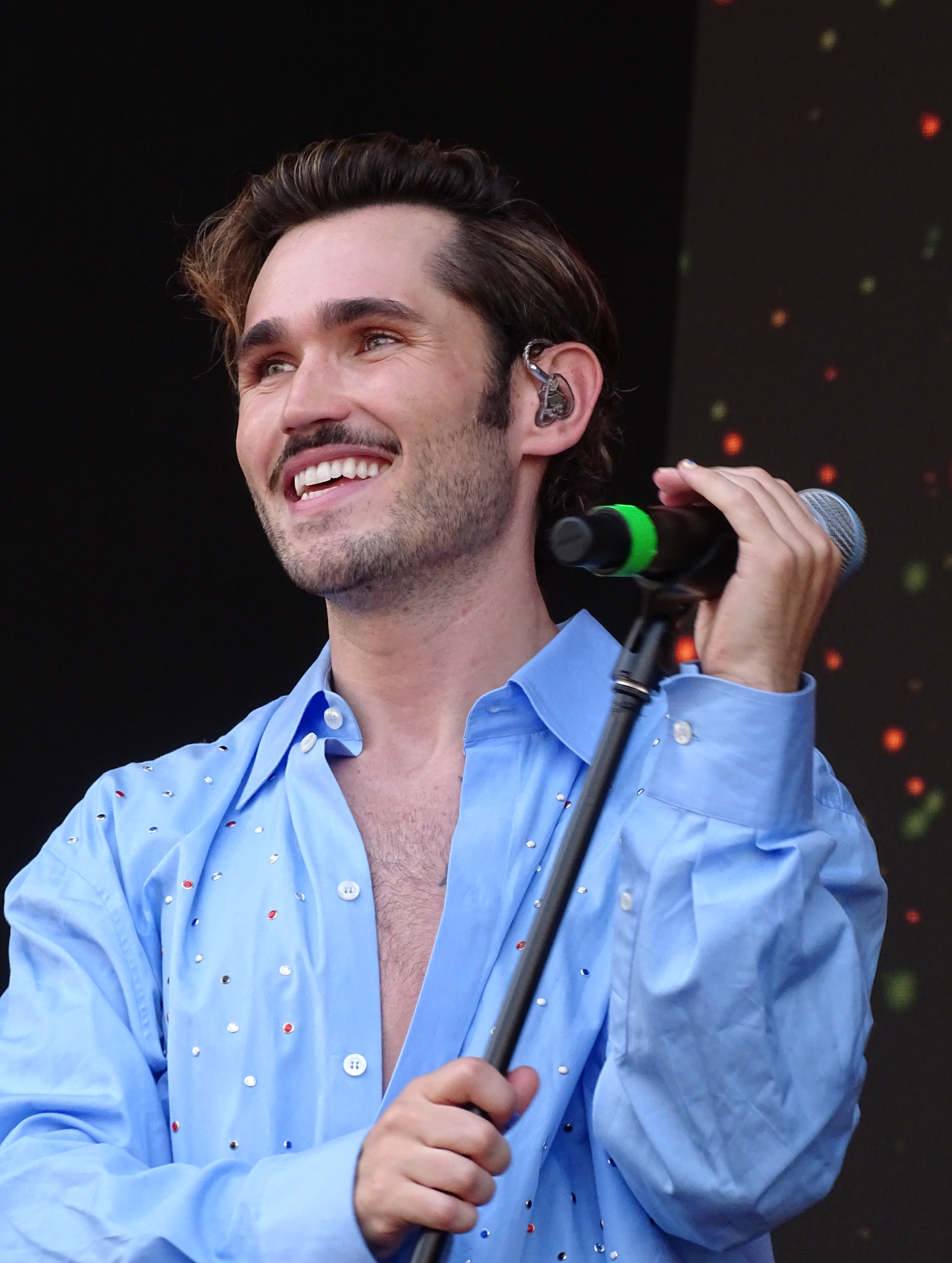
- Kena in 2025

Background information
- Born: Thomas McKenna; 1998 or 1999; London
- Genres: RnB; pop; electronic
- Occupation: singer-songwriter
- Years active: 2016–present
- Website: www.mosskena.com

Thomas McKenna (born 1998 or 1999), better known by his stage name Moss Kena is a British singer-songwriter.

== Early life and career ==
Moss Kena grew up as son of a record store-owner in London. He left school at 15 and started as singer-songwriter in coffeeshops and malls. Influenced by the music of Amy Winehouse, his career began in 2016 with a cover of Kendrick Lamar's song These Walls from the album To Pimp a Butterfly, which attracted the attention of the rapper.

It was followed by the EPs One+One and Found You in 06. He followed Rita Ora during her Phoenix UK-tour in 2019 and published the track You and Me together with Miraa May and the rapper Buddy over Ministry of Sound.

He managed the breakthrough in 2021 with the song Fireworks by Purple Disco Machine feat. The Knocks, in which the he participated as singer and songwriter.

In 2024 he relocated to Germany, basing himself in Berlin. The following year he competed at the Chefsache ESC, Germany's national final for the Eurovision Song Contest with the song "Nothing Can Stop Love". It finished in third place with almost 150,000 votes.

== Discography ==
=== Extended plays ===
- Found You in 06 (2018)
- One + One (2018)
- Live Acoustic Sessions (2019)
- After The Odyssey (2023)

=== Singles ===
| Title | Year | Peak chart positions | | | | | | | | | Certifications |
| Title | Year | GER | AUT | BEL (FL) | FRA | ITA | NLD | POL Air. | SWE | SWI | Certifications |
|---|---|---|---|---|---|---|---|---|---|---|---|
| "Square One" | 2018 | — | — | — | — | — | — | — | — | — | |
| "Reminds Me Of You" (with Toby Romeo) | 2021 | — | — | — | — | — | — | — | — | — | |
| "Fireworks" (with Purple Disco Machine & The Knocks) | 2021 | 32 | 34 | 36 | — | 42 | — | 5 | — | 83 | FIMI: Platinum; IFPI AUT: Platinum; ZPAV: Gold |
| "Forgot How to Love" (with Alle Farben) | 2022 | — | — | — | — | — | — | — | — | — | |
| "Light it Up" (with Super-Hi) | 2023 | — | — | — | — | — | — | — | — | — | |
| "California Lover" | 2024 | — | — | — | — | — | — | — | — | — | |
| "Cascading" | 2024 | — | — | — | — | — | — | — | — | — | |
| "Nothing Can Stop Love" | 2025 | — | — | — | — | — | — | — | — | — | |
| "Rhythm Unknown" | 2026 | — | — | — | — | — | — | — | — | — | |
"—" denotes a recording that did not chart or was not released.
