= T. L. Barrett =

American Pentecostal preacher and gospel musician (born 1944)

Thomas Lee Barrett, Jr. (born January 13, 1944), known professionally as Pastor T.L. Barrett and Rev. T.L. Barrett, is an American Pentecostal preacher and gospel musician. Barrett is a preacher on Chicago's South Side who released gospel albums in the 1970s; as a musician, he was largely unknown outside of Chicago until a resurgence in interest in his music occurred in the 2010s.

== Biography ==
Barrett was born on January 13, 1944, in Jamaica, New York, but his family moved to Chicago when he was young. Barrett's father was a gospel musician who was involved with the music at a church led by Barrett's aunt. He attended Wendell Phillips High School, where he was expelled. His father died when Barrett was 16, and he then moved to Queens, New York, where he lived with his uncle and took a job at Flushing Hospital extracting glands from cadavers. At 17 he was arrested for failing to pay child support to a 37-year-old who bore his child. In New York, he worked as a shoeshiner and played piano at parties and at venues such as the Waldorf Astoria and the Village Gate. Eventually, he decided to become a preacher, returning to Chicago and starting his own youth-focused ministry.

After receiving his G.E.D. diploma from the New York State Board of Regents in 1961, Barrett attended Bethel Bible Institute in Jamaica, New York, where he graduated with honors.

His career as a pastor began in 1966. He became pastor of Mt. Zion Baptist Church, in the Washington Park neighborhood of Chicago in 1968. After a theological disagreement with the elders of the Mt. Zion church, he left in 1976 to form his own ministry, the Life Center COGIC church, in the same neighborhood.

Barrett was charged in 1989 with orchestrating a pyramid scheme, by encouraging his congregants to donate to a series of economic development fundraisers which yielded over two million dollars in total. The financial viability of the plan was judged by a court to be infeasible, and Barrett was ordered to place his church's title in receivership as a result. He was ordered to repay 1.2 million dollars by 1998, which he did successfully.

In 1998, the Illinois House of Representatives honored Barrett for contributions to civic life in Chicago. The city of Chicago named a portion of Garfield Boulevard, close to his Mt. Zion church location, in Barrett's honor. In 2007 Barrett's youngest daughter Kleo, who worked as a Cook County sheriff's deputy, was murdered by a man whom she had previously dated three years earlier.

== Musical career ==
In the 1970s, Barrett's congregation included many noteworthy Chicago-area musicians, such as Maurice White and Philip Bailey of Earth, Wind and Fire, Donny Hathaway, and Phil Cohran. Barrett, recording as Pastor T.L. Barrett and the Youth for Christ Choir, released the album Like a Ship (Without a Sail) in 1971. The Youth for Christ Choir, led by Barrett, was an approximately 40-member ensemble of children ages 12 to 19, which grew out of his Tuesday night weekly choir meetings. The album featured instrumental contributions from Phil Upchurch, Gene Barge, Charles Pittman, and Richard Evans (of Rotary Connection). It was reissued by Light in the Attic Records in 2010 to critical acclaim and praise from musicians such as Jim James and Colin Greenwood. Barrett also released several further albums of music over the course of the 1970s, as well as discs of sermons; he also recorded as Rev. T.L. Barrett.

In 2016, Kanye West sampled "Father I Stretch My Hands", from Barrett's 1976 album Do Not Pass Me By, in parts one and two of "Father Stretch My Hands" on his album The Life of Pablo. (Barrett's song "Like a Ship" plays over the closing credits of the 2022 documentary jeen-yuhs: A Kanye Trilogy.) Also in 2016, Barrett's music was used in an Under Armour commercial directed by Harmony Korine, on the soundtrack to the film Barry, in the documentary series Last Chance U, and in the 2017 Almeida Theatre (London) production of Martin Crimp's The Treatment.

In 2019, Barrett's song "Nobody Knows," from his 1971 album Like a Ship (Without a Sail), was used in an AT&T commercial titled "Roll Up Your Sleeves" and in a trailer for the film Corpus Christi. Also in 2019, English musician Richard Ashcroft covered "Like a Ship" in concert and released it as a streaming single titled "Just Like a Ship"; additionally, he performed the song during a live session on Chris Evans's Virgin Radio UK breakfast show.

In 2020, "Like a Ship" was featured in the Netflix documentary Crip Camp and was sampled by electronic-music duo the Knocks in their song "All About You," featuring Foster the People.

In 2021, "Like a Ship" was used in a fighting scene in season 4, episode 13, of the CW series Black Lightning and in the closing credits of season one, episode nine, of HBO Max's Hacks.

In 2022, "Nobody Knows" was used in the closing credits of an episode of HBO’s Winning Time: The Rise of the Lakers Dynasty and was featured in the title sequence and opening credits of the HBO documentary Katrina Babies, written and directed by Edward Buckles Jr.

It was sampled by Loyle Carner on the song "Nobody Knows (Ladas Road)", which was nominated for BBC Radio 1's Hottest Record of The Year the same year in 2022.

Also in 2022, "Nobody Knows" was used on the soundtrack for the film Alice.

In 2023, "Nobody Knows" was used in the closing credits of episode 2 of the BBC culinary drama Boiling Point. It was also shortly used in a scene of the biopic Priscilla.

In 2024, "Like a Ship" was used in a commercial for Athletic Greens.

"Nobody Knows" has been sampled numerous times, including on rapper Copywrite's song "Trouble," from his album Murderland, and on DJ Khaled's album Grateful.

"Like a Ship" was included as the last song on Maribou State's on BBC Radio One's Essential Mix, released on February 1st, 2025.

Also in 2025, "Nobody Knows" appeared in the film Sentimental Value.

== Personal life ==
On July 1, 1967, he married his sweetheart, Cleopatra, with whom he has seven children: Kim, Kisha, T. L., III, Torrey, Trevore, T'Shaun, and Kleo. Barrett has at least six additional children from other relationships.

== Discography ==
=== Albums ===
- Like a Ship... (Without a Sail) (Mt. Zion Gospel Productions TL-8126, 1971)
- Vol. II; Do Not Pass Me By (Universal Awareness, ca. 1973) (Note: the "Vol. II" refers to this LP's status as a sequel to the prior "Like A Ship" LP, and not to the Gospel Roots LP of the same name, which would be released approximately three years later)
- I Found the Answer (Gospel Truth GTS-2718, 1973)
- Do Not Pass Me By (Gospel Roots GR-5002, 1976)

=== Sermons released on LP ===
- Please Don't Squeeze the Charmine
- John M. Smith (Or Do You Say Smythe?)
- If I Should Wake Before I Die
- It Tastes So Good
- How Would You Like to Have a Nice Hawaiian Punch?
- Dry Bones in the Valley
- Roots (Gospel Roots GR-5009, 1977)
