= Fireworks (Purple Disco Machine song) =

2021 single by Purple Disco Machine featuring Moss Kena and The Knocks

Single by Purple Disco Machine featuring Moss Kena and The Knocks

from the album Exotica
- Released: 19 February 2021
- Genre: Funky house; Tropical house
- Length: 3:20
- Label: Positiva
- Songwriters: Amir Salem; Benjamin Ruttner; James Patterson; Moss Kena; Paul Harris; Tino Schmidt
- Producer: Tino Schmidt Benjamin Ruttner James Patterson

Purple Disco Machine singles chronology
"Exotica" (2020)	"Fireworks" (2021)	"Playbox" (2021)

The Knocks singles chronology
"All About You" (2020)	"Fireworks" (2021)	"R U High" (2021)

Music video
- "Fireworks" on YouTube

"Fireworks" is a song by German disco and house music producer and DJ Purple Disco Machine featuring British singer-songwriter Moss Kena and American electronic music duo The Knocks, it was released on 19 February 2021. It is the second single from Purple Disco Machine's second studio album, Exotica.

== Composition ==
The song is written in the key of C# major, with a tempo of 118 beats per minute.

== Music video ==
The music video was released on 19 February 2021, and directed by Greg Barth. It features "street dancing gangs of the 'Boomers' and 'Gen-Z' battling it out in the ultimate turf war." The video contains references to denial of human-triggered climate change, among other social phenomenons.

== Credits and personnel ==
Credits adapted from Tidal.

- Purple Disco Machine (Tino Schmidt) – writer, composition, associate interpreter
- Moss Kena – writer, composition, associate interpreter
- James Patterson (The Knocks) – writer, composition, associate interpreter
- Benjamin Ruttner (The Knocks) – writer, composition, associate interpreter
- Paul Harris – writer, composition
- Amir Saleem – writer, composition
- Monte – mixing engineer

== Charts ==
=== Weekly charts ===
Weekly chart performance for "Fireworks"
Chart (2021–2023)	Peak position
Austria (Ö3 Austria Top 40)	34
Belgium (Ultratop 50 Flanders)	36
Belgium (Ultratop 50 Wallonia)	15
CIS Airplay (TopHit)	16
Germany (GfK)	32
Germany Airplay (BVMI)	1
Hungary (Dance Top 40)	13
Hungary (Rádiós Top 40)	16
Hungary (Single Top 40)	26
Italy (FIMI)	42
Lithuania Airplay (TopHit)	116
Poland Airplay (ZPAV)	5
Russia Airplay (TopHit)	14
Switzerland (Schweizer Hitparade)	83
US Hot Dance/Electronic Songs (Billboard)	35

=== Monthly charts ===
Monthly chart performance for "Fireworks"
Chart (2021)	Peak position
CIS Airplay (TopHit)	18
Russia Airplay (TopHit)	16

=== Year-end charts ===
Year-end chart performance for "Fireworks"
Chart (2021)	Position
Belgium (Ultratop Wallonia)	46
CIS Airplay (TopHit)	60
Hungary (Dance Top 40)	79
Poland (ZPAV)	50
Russia Airplay (TopHit)	77

Year-end chart performance for "Fireworks"
Chart (2024)	Position
Lithuania Airplay (TopHit)	131

Year-end chart performance for "Fireworks"
Chart (2025)	Position
Lithuania Airplay (TopHit)	166

== Certifications ==
Certifications for "Fireworks"
Region	Certification	Certified units/sales
Austria (IFPI Austria)	Platinum	30,000^{‡}
France (SNEP)	Gold	100,000^{‡}
Hungary (MAHASZ)	Platinum	4,000^{‡}
Italy (FIMI)	Platinum	70,000^{‡}
Poland (ZPAV)	Gold	25,000^{‡}
^{‡} Sales+streaming figures based on certification alone.

== Release history ==
Release history and versions for "Fireworks"
Region	Date	Format	Version	Label	Ref.
Various	19 February 2021	Digital download; streaming	Original	Positiva	
Various	19 February 2021	Digital download; streaming	Remixes	Positiva	
Various	12 March 2021	Digital download; streaming	Club Dub Mix	Positiva	
