= Headphones (Little Boots song) =

Single by Little Boots
- Released: 3 June 2012
- Recorded: 2012
- Length: 3:51
- Label: Elektra
- Songwriters: Victoria Hesketh; Benjamin Ruttner; James Patterson
- Producer: the Knocks

Little Boots singles chronology
"Every Night I Say a Prayer" (2012)	"Headphones" (2012)	"Broken Record" (2013)

"Headphones" is a song by English singer Little Boots, included on her mixtape Jubilee Disco. To promote the song, Hesketh released a series of clips from the music video in which several people enter a booth and put on a pair of headphones while looking through a pane of glass. It was first released for sale on 3 June 2012 digitally by Elektra Records. "Headphones" was originally intended to be included in Little Boots' second studio album Nocturnes (2013), but was later cut out from the final track listing.

== Critical reception ==
Popjustice's critics stated that they enjoyed the song, but were confused by Hesketh's releases and promotion. They compared her earlier career to Kylie Minogue when promoting her debut Hands, but stated that she is acting more like Hot Chip with her releases this time around.

== Music video ==
The music video for "Headphones" was directed by Bullion Collective, and premiered on 6 June 2012, on Little Boots's YouTube channel. Hesketh described the content of the video as people going to a peep show booth, but they wear headphones and listen to music: "The idea is that everyday characters enter a booth and on listening to the song their extrovert selves appear in the reflection, so the song is a way of releasing their inner selves and setting the crazier side of them free... We wanted to create an energetic party atmosphere to fit the song whilst avoiding the cliches of a lot of current club themed videos." She was inspired in part by the film Paris, Texas.

== Track listing ==
- Digital EP
1. "Headphones" – 3:52
2. "Headphones" (Todd Edwards Vocal Remix) – 6:02
3. "Headphones" (Todd Edwards Dub Remix) – 5:50
4. "Headphones" (Dmitri From Paris Remix) – 4:03
5. "Headphones" (Ronika Remix) – 3:59

A further official remix by Moon Boots (length 5:19) was issued as a free download on Little Boots' SoundCloud page.
