= Before the Waves =

Studio album by Magic Man
- Released: July 8, 2014
- Genre: Indie pop; electronic rock
- Label: Columbia
- Producer: Alex Aldi

Magic Man chronology
Real Life Color (2010)	Before the Waves (2014)

Before the Waves is the second and final album and major label debut by the Boston band Magic Man. It was produced by Alex Aldi and released on July 8, 2014 by Columbia Records. The first single, "Out Of Mind", and the accompanying music video were released May 19, 2014.

== Recording ==
In an interview with Sound of Boston, Sam revealed that the sample at the beginning of "Texas" was discovered while digging for records; it was "one of the best things we ever found in those record bins." The band "worked with a bunch of different producers and had a really good connection with Alex [Aldi]", who helped craft the album and track listing in the studio. The drummer, Joey Sulkowski, and bassist, Gabe Goodman of Magic Man at the time did not record (their parts are performed by Larry Gorman and Daniel Radin, respectively).

== Album artwork ==
The artwork for the album and all singles from it are photography by Tobias Hutzler, a British art student whose previous work the band had come across online. The series, commissioned by Sony for the album campaign, uses long exposure to capture the movement of flares and glow sticks in tidal pools and the ocean. The also directed the lyric video for "It All Starts Here", which was originally uploaded to Vevo and YouTube on June 26, 2014 and features footage from the same photo shoot.

Magic Man previously used one of Hutzler's photos for the cover of their EP You Are Here.

Professional ratings
Review scores
Source	Rating
Substream	4/5 stars
Slug	7/08 stars

== Critical reception ==
The album was met by positive reviews. GQ called the album "12 Tracks of Alt Joy", saying it is "full of solid electric beats, hazy (good hazy) vocals, and synth."

The Boston Globe wrote, "The songs, particularly first single 'Paris,' unfurl with an emphasis on keeping everything light and airy. Frontman Alex Caplow has a similar sweep in his voice, the kind of majestic croon that suggests it will sound perfect in stadium-size sing-alongs", later adding that, "The album puts Magic Man in the same league as other electro-leaning pop bands, from St. Lucia to Sir Sly."

Conversely, SLUG Magazine called them "a summery band—disposable, frothy and lacking true substance or musicianship. Not that there's anything wrong with that, but beneath the transparently '80s-sounding disposable melodies, these tunes lack depth and memorable choruses," and questioned the seriousness of the band, citing the fact that two of the artists on the recording were not members of the band.

Substream Magazine gave the album 4 out of 5, saying, "The album has an energetic sense of urgency, inspiring the listener to never spend one minute sitting still, but to go out and experience everything life has to offer," and further adding, "Besides the story-like lyrics, Before the Waves would not be the polished product it is without the magical sounds of their ever present synth, which adapts to fit the mode of any song."

Sound of Boston gave the album an 8.3 out of 10, noting that "Before the Waves thrives in a classic indie-pop space: a portrait of the best parts of youthful bliss."

== Track listing ==
All tracks are written by Alex Caplow and Sam Lee.

No.	Title	Length
1.	"Texas"	3:37
2.	"Apollo"	3:33
3.	"Paris"	3:52
4.	"Catherine"	3:36
5.	"Chicagoland"	4:22
6.	"Honey"	3:43
7.	"Tonight"	3:37
8.	"Every Day"	3:39
9.	"Out of Mind"	3:31
10.	"Waves"	3:43
11.	"Too Much"	3:56
12.	"It All Starts Here"	5:09
13.	"South Dakota" (Hidden track)	2:52

== Personnel ==
- Alex Caplow – lead vocals
- Sam Lee – guitars, synths, programming; backing vocals on "Chicagoland", "Too Much", and "It All Starts Here"; bass guitar on "Catherine", and "Honey"
- Daniel Radin – bass guitar on all tracks except "Catherine"; backing vocals on all tracks except "Catherine", "Honey", "Out Of Mind", "Waves", and "Too Much"
- Justine Bowe – backing vocals on all tracks except "Too Much"; piano on "Paris"
- Larry Gorman – drums
- Alex Aldi – programming, production
- Graham Brown – [Artist Management]

== Trivia ==
"Tonight" was featured on the soundtrack to the 2014 EA Sports game FIFA 15.

On April 8, 2016 Before the Waves (Remixes) was released, which consists of remixes of "Paris", "Out of Mind", and "Tonight" by artists including Walk the Moon, Tokyo Police Club, and The Griswolds.

The movie: The song Out of Mind was played at the end of The Outcasts movie.
