= St. Lucia (musician) =

South African singer and musician

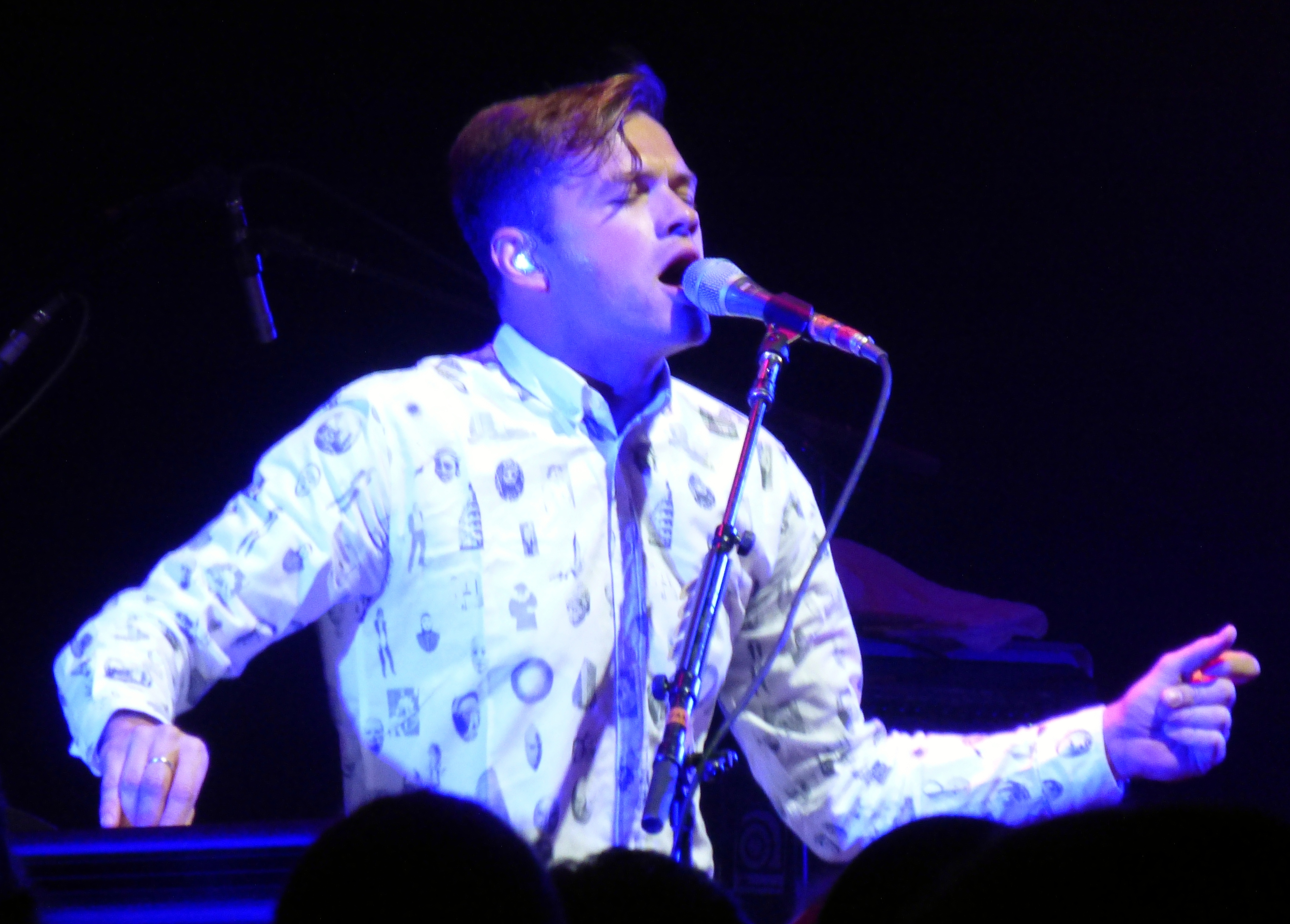
- St. Lucia in 2014

Background information
- Born: Jean-Philip Grobler; 1983 (age 42–43); Johannesburg, South Africa
- Origin: Brooklyn, New York
- Genres: Indie electronic, synth-pop, new wave, electropop
- Years active: 2012–present
- Labels: Neon Gold Records, Columbia Records, Nettwerk Records
- Members: Jean-Philip Grobler; Patti Beranek; Ross Clark; Nick Paul; Dustin Kaufman
- Website: stlucianewyork.com

Jean-Philip Grobler (born 1983), known for his musical project St. Lucia, is a South African singer and musician based in Konstanz, Germany. He is signed to Nettwerk Records and to date has released six albums: When the Night (2013), Matter (2016), Hyperion (2018), Utopia (2022), Fata Morgana: Dawn, and Fata Morgana: Dusk (both 2025).

The band is named after St Lucia, South Africa.

== Early life ==
Grobler was born in Johannesburg and raised in South Africa. He spent much of his childhood singing in the Drakensberg Boys' Choir which travelled and performed internationally.

Grobler started making music when he was 12 years old. He was inspired by Boyz II Men, Michael Jackson, Sting, and Phil Collins. He soon was experimenting with rock music; however, after 10 years, he got bored with it and got back to the 80s music influences from his childhood. In 2013, when asked about his main musical influences, he noted Phil Collins, Fleetwood Mac (especially Tango in the Night), Radiohead (OK Computer), Mew (And the Glass Handed Kites), and Paul Simon (Graceland). He has also cited Lionel Richie's album Dancing on the Ceiling as an influence.

== Career ==
At the age of 19 Grobler left South Africa to study music in Liverpool, UK. After studying music at the Liverpool Institute for Performing Arts in England for three years he moved to Brooklyn, NY. There he worked for The Lodge, which helps with music licensing for films and television shows, while continuing to work on his own music. When he was signed to Neon Gold Records in 2012, they re-released his self-titled EP he had previously released independently. Also, during the time, he featured vocals in The Knocks' single "Modern Hearts", which was released in 2013. His debut full-length album, When the Night, was released in October 2013. The A.V. Club drew comparisons between St. Lucia and OMD, observing "smart synths" and "triumphant hooks".

Live performances have included fellow musicians Nick Brown, Ross Clark, Dustin Kaufman, Nicky Paul and Patricia Beranek. Grobler has also remixed tracks for such bands as Passion Pit, Foster the People, The colourist and Charli XCX. He produced the debut album by HAERTS. Grobler also opened for Two Door Cinema Club during their 2013 tours. Grobler kicked off his St. Lucia 2014 nationwide tour in Philadelphia on 13 January 2014, and continued to tour across the US and Australia in the months following.

In early December 2014, St. Lucia played a special acoustic set at Renaissance Boston Waterfront Hotel, during which Grobler shared stories about his songs and performed the first live performance of "Call Me Up" and first acoustic rendition of "All Eyes on You."

St. Lucia released the track "Dancing on Glass" in October 2015, and its music video in November 2015. The next single, "Physical", was released in December 2015. These two singles appear on the second studio album, Matter, released on 29 January 2016. A music video was then released for "Help Me Run Away," another song on the album, Matter, in June 2016. The album cover was designed by Jean-Philip Grobler and Patti Beranek from St. Lucia, along with Silas Adler from Soulland, the Danish men's fashion brand.

In June 2018, St. Lucia released two singles, "A Brighter Love" and "Paradise is Waiting", off their third studio album, Hyperion. The next single, "Walking Away" was released in July 2018. Music videos for "A Brighter Love" and "Walking Away" were released in August 2018. Two more singles, "Bigger" and "Next to You", were released in September. The complete album Hyperion was released 21 September 2018.

In 2019, St. Lucia released its Acoustic Vol. 1 EP on April 26, 2019.

In April 2022, St. Lucia released the EP Utopia I.

== Personal life ==
Grobler married Patricia (Patti) Beranek in 2012 after the two had dated for 10 years.

They welcomed their first child, Indiana “Indy” Elliot Grobler, on 20 December 2017.

Their second child, Charlie Benjamin Parker, was born on 13 November 2020 at Konstanz, Germany, where Patricia Beranek had grown up.

In February 2021, Grobler and his family moved from New York to Konstanz, Germany, in order to be closer to Beranek's family.

== Band members ==
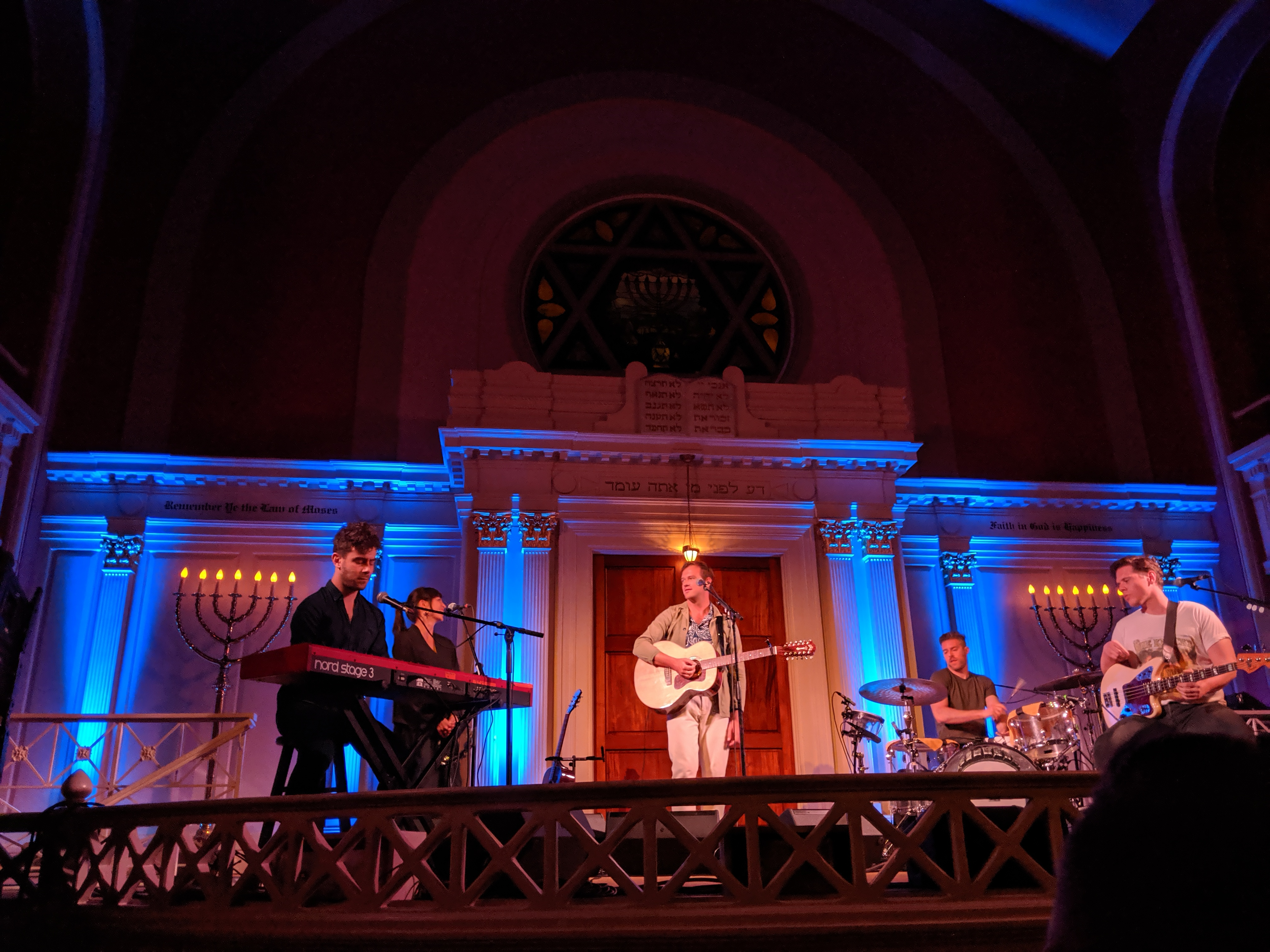
St. Lucia between sets at a performance at the Sixth & I Historic Synagogue in Washington, DC

- Jean-Philip Grobler – vocals, guitar
- Ross Clark – bass guitar
- Nick Paul – keyboards, synthesizers
- Dustin Kaufman – drums
- Patti Beranek – keyboards, percussion, backing vocals

== Discography ==
=== Studio albums ===
Title	Album details	Peak chart positions	
Title	Album details	US	US Heat.
When the Night	Released: 4 October 2013; Label: Neon Gold / Columbia; Format: CD, LP, digital download	191	6
Matter	Released: 29 January 2016; Label: Columbia; Format: CD, LP, digital download	97	-
Hyperion	Released: 21 September 2018; Label: Columbia; Format: LP, digital download	-	-
Utopia	Released: 7 October 2022; Label: Nettwerk; Format: LP, digital download	-	-
Fata Morgana: Dawn	Released: 14 March 2025; Label: Nettwerk; Format: Digital download	-	-
Fata Morgana: Dusk	Released: 5 December 2025; Label: Nettwerk; Format: Digital download	-	-
"—" denotes a recording that did not chart or was not released in that territory.

=== Extended plays ===
Title	Album details
St. Lucia	Released: 6 March 2012; Label: Neon Gold / Columbia
September	Released: 24 September 2012; Label: Neon Gold / Columbia
A Brighter Love / Paradise Is Waiting	Released: 22 June 2018; Label: Columbia
Utopia I	Released: 29 April 2022; Label: Nettwerk

=== Singles ===
Title	Year	Album
"Dancing on Glass"	2015	Matter
"Physical"	2015	Matter
"Love Somebody"	2016	Matter
"Help Me Run Away"	2016	Matter
"Paradise Is Waiting"	2018	Hyperion
"Walking Away"	2018	Hyperion
"Another Lifetime"	2022	Utopia I
"Back to You"	2024	Non-album single
"Falling Asleep"	2024	Fata Morgana: Dawn
"Fear of Falling"	2024	Fata Morgana: Dawn
"Pie in the Sky"	2024	Fata Morgana: Dawn
"Campari Lips & Soda"	2024	Fata Morgana: Dawn
"Rolling Man"	2025	Fata Morgana: Dawn
"Crimes of Passion"	2025	Fata Morgana: Dusk

==== As featured artist ====
Title	Year	Album
"Sun Goes Down" (Icona Pop featuring the Knocks & St. Lucia)	2012	Icona Pop
"Modern Hearts" (The Knocks featuring St. Lucia)	2013	Non-album single
"Ready for It" (RAC featuring St. Lucia)	2014	Strangers
"The Beautiful Game" (RAC featuring St. Lucia)	2017	Ego
"Better Days" (RAC featuring St. Lucia)	2020	Boy

=== Songwriting and production credits ===
Title	Year	Artist(s)	Album	Contributing Member(s)	Credit(s)	Written with:	Produced with:
"Dancing with Myself"	2015	The Knocks	55	Ross Clark	Co-writer	Benjamin Ruttner, James Patterson, Michael Francis Gonzalez, Thomas Eickmann	-
"I Wish (My Taylor Swift)" (with Matthew Koma)	2015	The Knocks	55	Ross Clark	Co-writer	Benjamin Ruttner, James Patterson, Matthew Bair	-
"Kiss the Sky" (featuring Wyclef Jean)	2016	The Knocks	55	Ross Clark	Co-writer	Benjamin Ruttner, James Patterson, Madeline Nelson, Wyclef Jean	-
"The Key"	2016	The Knocks	55	Ross Clark	Co-writer	Benjamin Ruttner, James Patterson, Phoebe Ryan	-
"Love Me Like That" (featuring Carly Rae Jepsen)	2016	The Knocks	55	Ross Clark	Co-writer	Benjamin Ruttner, Carly Rae Jepsen, Christopher Paul Caswell, Hannah Robinson, James Patterson, Martina Sorbara, Richard Philips	-
"Cinderella" (featuring Magic Man)	2016	The Knocks	55	Ross Clark	Co-writer	Benjamin Ruttner, James Patterson, Alexander Caplow, Sam Nelson Harris, Samuel Lee	-
"My Girl" (featuring Sasha Mari)	2016	Wyclef Jean	Non-album single	Ross Clark	Co-writer	Wyclef Jean, Benjamin Ruttner, James Patterson, Madeline Nelson, Ivan Rosenburg, Phoebe Ryan	-
"What Happened to Love" (featuring LunchMoney Lewis)	2017	Wyclef Jean	The Carnival Vol. III: The Fall & Rise of a Refugee	Ross Clark	Co-writer	Wyclef Jean, Benjamin Ruttner, James Patterson, Jacob Kasher Hindlin	-
"Wings"	2018	Haerts	Love, Simon: OST	Jean-Philip Grobler	Producer	-	Haerts
"The Way"	2018	Haerts	New Compassion	Jean-Philip Grobler	Co-writer/Producer	Nini Fabi, Benjamin Gebert	Haerts
"New Compassion"	2018	Haerts	New Compassion	Jean-Philip Grobler	Co-writer/Producer	Nini Fabi, Benjamin Gebert	Haerts
"Limo"	2018	The Knocks	New York Narcotic	Jean-Philip Grobler	Co-writer/Producer	Benjamin Ruttner, James Patterson	The Knocks
"Wizard of Bushwick" (featuring Sir Sly)	2018	The Knocks	New York Narcotic	Ross Clark	Co-writer	Benjamin Ruttner, James Patterson, Landon Jacobs	-
"Mad Love"	2019	Blu DeTiger	Non-album single	Ross Clark	Co-writer	Blu DeTiger, Janee Bennett, Benjamin Ruttner, James Patterson	-
