= At Home with the Kids =

Studio album by Various artists
- Released: August 13, 2020
- Label: Atlantic

At Home with the Kids (stylized as At home with the kids) is a charity compilation album released by Atlantic Records on August 28, 2020. The album was produced during the COVID-19 lockdowns with the intention of "mak[ing] some music in our living rooms to share with kids and their parents during this difficult mess we’ve found ourselves in." Proceeds from the album went to Save the Children.

== Track listing ==
1. Portugal. The Man, "Tomorrow"
2. Sia, "Riding on My Bike"
3. Royal & the Serpent, "The ABC Song"
4. Shelley FKA DRAM, "Twinkle Twinkle Little Star"
5. Chromeo, "Georgy Porgy"
6. Kyle, "Pickle"
7. Anderson East, "I Ain't No Zebra I'm a Bumblebee"
8. Gnash, "Night Night"
9. Christina Perri, "It's a Small World"
10. Ema Jo Cobb, "Hawaii"
11. Midland, "Farmer John"
12. Ben Abraham, "Eat Your Food"
13. Charlotte Cardin, "Hush Little Baby"
14. Charlotte Lawrence, "Lavender's Blue"
15. IV Jay, "Rock A Bye Baby"
16. Matt Maeson, "Giants"
17. Chloe Moriondo, "Oh My Darling Clementine"
18. A/J from Saint Motel, "Big Ol World"
19. A Thousand Horses, "The Golden Rule"
20. Aaron Raitiere, "If You Love Yo Mama"
21. The Knocks, "Star Design"
22. Tove Lo, "Buzz Buzz Hop Hop"
23. Winona Oak, "Who Can Sail"
