= Matter (album) =

Studio album by St. Lucia
- Released: January 29, 2016
- Genre: Synthpop, electropop, indietronica
- Length: 53:47
- Label: Columbia
- Producer: St. Lucia; Patricia Baranek; Chris Zane; Jack Antonoff; Joe LaPorta

St. Lucia chronology
When the Night (2013)	Matter (2016)	Hyperion (2018)

Singles from Matter
- 1. "Dancing on Glass" Released: October 22, 2015; 2. "Physical" Released: December 4, 2015; 3. "Love Somebody" Released: January 8, 2016; 4. "Help Me Run Away" Released: January 21, 2016

Professional ratings
Review scores
Source	Rating
Consequence of Sound	D+
Idolator	3.5/5
Rolling Stone	3/5 stars
Billboard	4/5 stars

Matter is the second studio album by New York-based act St. Lucia. It was released on January 29, 2016, via Columbia Records.

== Track listing ==
No.	Title	Writer(s)	Producer(s)	Length
1.	"Do You Remember"	Jean-Philip Grobler	St. Lucia; Chris Zane	3:27
2.	"Home"	Grobler	St. Lucia; Zane	4:22
3.	"Dancing on Glass"	Grobler; Tim Pagnotta	St. Lucia; Zane	3:27
4.	"Physical"	Grobler; Benjamin Berger; Ryan McMahon; Ryan Rabin	St. Lucia; Zane	5:29
5.	"Game 4 U"	Grobler; Berger; McMahon; Rabin	St. Lucia; Zane	4:36
6.	"The Winds of Change"	Grobler	St. Lucia; Zane	5:24
7.	"Love Somebody"	Grobler	St. Lucia; Zane; Joe LaPorta	5:00
8.	"Rescue Me"	Grobler	St. Lucia; Zane	6:30
9.	"Stay"	Grobler	St. Lucia; Zane	5:18
10.	"Help Me Run Away"	Grobler; Jack Antonoff	St. Lucia; Antonoff; Zane	4:48
11.	"Always"	Grobler; Patricia Baranek	St. Lucia; Zane	4:52

== Personnel ==
Credits adapted from the liner notes.

Musicians

- St. Lucia – vocals
- Ross Clark – guitar, bass guitar
- Patricia Beranek – keyboards, percussion, vocals
- Nicholas Paul - Piano, Keyboards
- Dustin Kaufman – drums
- Chris Zane – drums
- Tim Vaughn – trombone
- Johnathon Powell – trumpet
- John Carlson – trumpet
- John Natchez – saxophone, flute
- Tim Sullivan – saxophone

Technical

- Jean-Philip Grobler – engineering, production
- Andrew Lappin - engineering
- Chris Zane – engineering, mixing, additional production
- Jack Antonoff – programming, editing
- Andy Baldwin – drum engineering, mixing
- Benjamin Gebert – production

Additional personnel

- Derek Davies – A&R
- Andrew Keller – A&R
- Lizzy Plapinger – A&R
- Jeff Gilligan – art direction, design
- Lauren Mortimer – Illustration
