= Every Night I Say a Prayer =

Single by Little Boots

from the album Nocturnes
- Released: 21 April 2012
- Recorded: 2012
- Genre: Synth-pop, house
- Length: 3:39
- Label: 679, Trax
- Songwriters: Victoria Hesketh, Andy Butler
- Producers: Hesketh, Butler

Little Boots singles chronology
"Shake" (2011)	"Every Night I Say a Prayer" (2012)	"Headphones" (2012)

"Every Night I Say a Prayer" is a song by English recording artist Little Boots, released as the second single from her second studio album, Nocturnes (2013). Written with Hercules and Love Affair's Andy Butler, the song was released as a limited edition 12" vinyl to commemorate Record Store Day on 21 April 2012, and Little Boots performed a set at Rough Trade East on the same day. The song was later released as a free download on 23 April. "Every Night I Say a Prayer" was originally included on Little Boots's mixtape Into the Future as its title track, until the title changed.

To further promote the new single, Little Boots and Trax Records sent four remixes of the song to Nylon magazine, who published them for streaming on their website which will later be used as the American promotional release.

The single was regarded by Michael Cragg from The Guardian, as one of the Top 5 modern disco tracks.

== Critical reception ==
Genevieve Oliver of Pretty Much Amazing called the song a "sexy disco track" with elements of "euro-pop deconstructed and stark piano chords, a beat so irresistible it might as well have been constructed in a lab, and awesomely edited vocals, this is the kind of dark-pop jam-of-all-jams that comes along only once in a while". Katherine St. Asaph of Popdust gave a mixed review stating, "[Little Boots] can't quite deliver the chorus like a true diva—her voice's too composed, not quite big enough—but fortunately, that's the only time she tries." St. Asaph continued, "The verses suit her much better; instead of going over the top, she processes her vocals to the texture of liquid metal, distant and slippery enough with reverb to slide right off the key into its cracks. This style has its predecessors, too—Kylie Minogue, Sophie Ellis-Bextor and Sarah Cracknell alone make up an imposing list—but it complements Little Boots." Bradley Stern of MuuMuse stated the track "tip-toes in between warm washes of '90's club pulsations, weird ambient noises bubbling in the background and a gorgeous piano melody [...] It's like stepping back in time, Rhythm of Love style!"

== Music video ==
The music video for "Every Night I Say a Prayer", directed by Zaiba Jabbar, premiered on 1 May 2012 on Little Boots's YouTube account. The video sees Little Boots singing alongside a troupe of ultra-trendy, sexually ambigiuous young dancers.

Michael Roffman of Consequence of Sound described the video as a combination of "Van Halen's Crystal Pepsi commercial for 'Right Now' with anything Madonna did during her Erotica-era."

== Track listing ==
- Digital download
1. "Every Night I Say a Prayer" – 3:38
2. "Every Night I Say a Prayer" (Tensnake Remix) – 6:26
- Limited edition vinyl

A1. "Every Night I Say a Prayer" – 3:39
B1. "Every Night I Say a Prayer" (Tensnake Remix) – 6:26
B2. "Every Night I Say a Prayer" (Joe Smooth N. Halstead Remix) – 4:35

- Remix EP
1. "Every Night I Say a Prayer" (Nic Sarno Remix) – 5:26
2. "Every Night I Say a Prayer" (Joe Smooth N. Halstead Remix) – 4:35
3. "Every Night I Say a Prayer" (My Panda Shall Fly Dark Ambient Remix) – 5:52
4. "Every Night I Say a Prayer" (Screamin' D-Man Jukey Juke Remix featuring Screamin' Rachel) – 3:18
