= Shake (Little Boots song) =

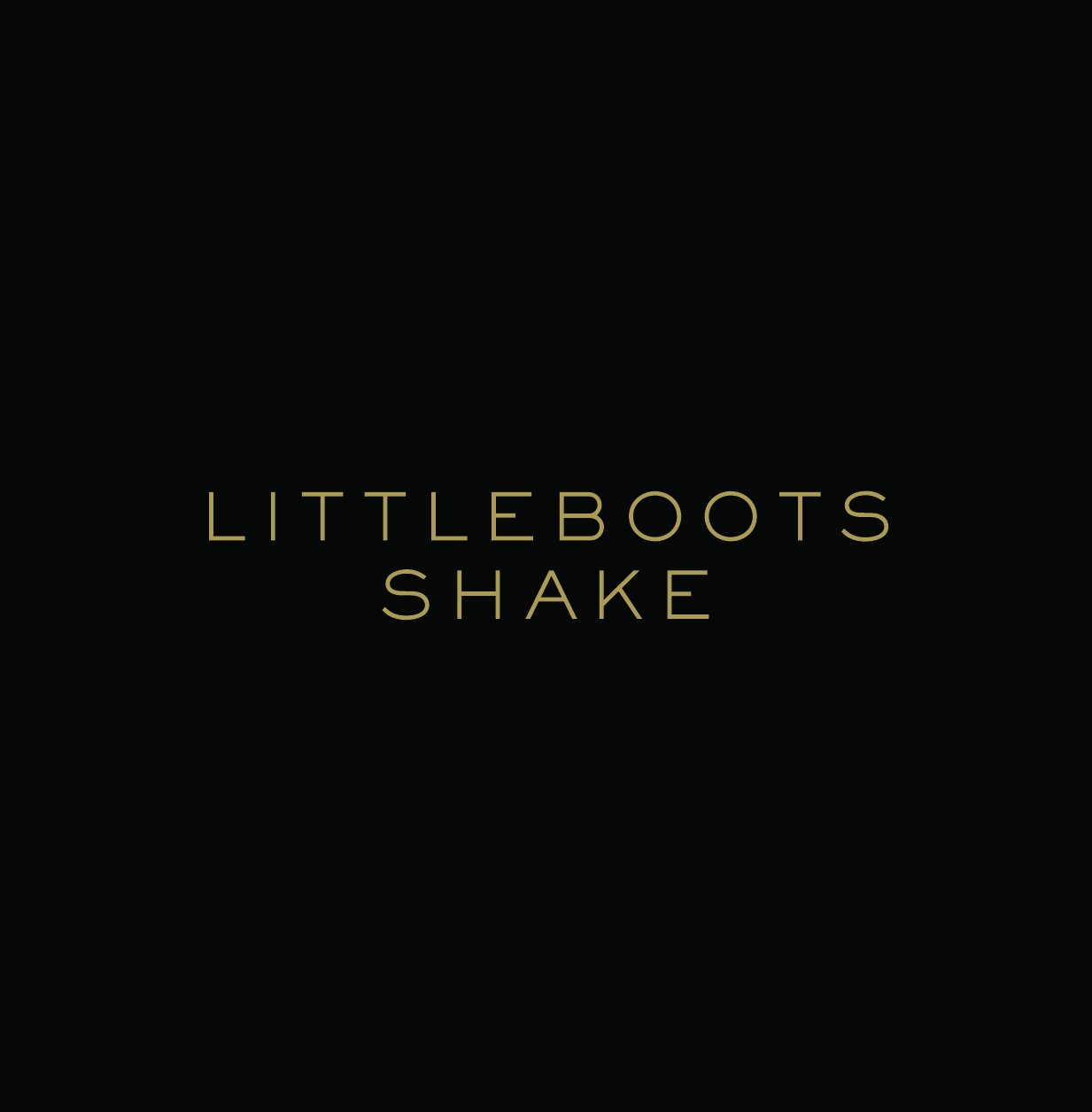

Single by Little Boots

from the album Nocturnes
- Released: 11 November 2011
- Genre: Nu-disco, synth-pop, electro house
- Length: 6:19 (full length version); 5:31 (album version)
- Label: 679
- Songwriter(s): Victoria Hesketh, James Ford
- Producer(s): James Ford

Little Boots singles chronology
"Earthquake" (2009)	"Shake" (2011)	"Every Night I Say a Prayer" (2012)

"Shake" is a song by English recording artist Little Boots, released as the lead single from her second studio album, Nocturnes (2013). Written by Boots and James Ford and produced by Ford, the song was released in the United Kingdom on 11 November 2011.

== Background ==
"Shake" premiered on BBC Radio 1 on 11 November 2011 and follows the release of Boots's mixtape Shake Until Your Heart Breaks, released online in October 2011.

== Critical reception ==
MusicOMH described "Shake" as "a pumping, housey, dancefloor stomper, with VERY. DEFINITIVE. BEATS. It is rather good, even though we're in the group of people who normally feel very stupid saying pumping, housey, dancefloor stomper." Ryan Reed of Billboard wrote that the song "detonates only moments into its six-plus minutes, stuffed to the max with a heavy beat and liquid synth-bass that smacks you straight against the night club subwoofers. Repetitive and far from innovative, 'Shake' occasionally threatens to lapse into generic, A Night at the Roxbury-esque territory, but the longer the track drones on, the more likely the listener will fall slave to its sheer determination."

== Track listings ==
- UK digital download
1. "Shake" – 6:19
- UK limited 12" single

A1. "Shake"
A2. "Shake" (Acapella)
B1. "Shake" (Original Dub)
B2. "Shake" (Instrumental)

== Charts ==
Chart (2011)	Peak position
UK Dance Singles Chart	37

== Release history ==
Country	Date	Label	Format
United Kingdom	11 November 2011	679 Artists	Digital download
United Kingdom	12 November 2011	679 Artists	12" single
