= Nocturnes (Little Boots album) =

Studio album by Little Boots
- Released: 3 May 2013
- Recorded: March 2010 – January 2013
- Genres: Synth-pop; dance; house
- Length: 50:12
- Label: On Repeat
- Producers: Andrew Butler; James Ford; Tim Goldsworthy; Jeppe Laursen; Ariel Rechtshaid

Little Boots chronology
Illuminations (2009)	Nocturnes (2013)	Working Girl (2015)

Singles from Nocturnes
- 1. "Shake" Released: 11 November 2011; 2. "Every Night I Say a Prayer" Released: 21 April 2012; 3. "Broken Record" Released: 18 March 2013; 4. "Satellite" Released: 6 September 2013

Nocturnes is the second studio album by English singer and songwriter Little Boots. It was released on 3 May 2013 on her record label On Repeat Records. Featuring production from DFA's Tim Goldsworthy, Simian Mobile Disco's James Ford and Hercules and Love Affair's Andy Butler, the album "celebrates 90s house, seventies disco and futuristic electronics". According to Little Boots, the record is titled Nocturnes because it is "an album indebted to the night".

Upon release, the album received generally positive reviews from music critics. Nocturnes debuted at number 45 on the UK Albums Chart, selling 2,465 copies in its first week.

== Background ==
Little Boots first revealed plans for her second album during an interview with Artistdirect on 1 March 2010, stating it would be "rawer and a bit more down-to-earth. It'll still be magical, but quite dark and spooky at the same time." On 1 May 2011, Little Boots performed at the China Music Valley International Music Festival in Beijing, where she debuted the track "Crescendo". On 20 October 2011, she released a mixtape titled Shake Until Your Heart Breaks, which featured the single "Shake". She released her third mixtape, Into the Future, on 9 March 2012, containing a remix of the single "Every Night I Say a Prayer".

In an interview with DIY on 12 December 2012, Little Boots revealed that she was putting the finishing touches to her second album, commenting, "I feel a lot more at peace about where I'm at creatively as an artist now than a year or so ago [...] I think everyone is always nervous releasing anything they've created into the world, but I've realized what I want to do and how I can achieve it, rather than trying to please other people." Sonically, she stated the album "definitely feels more representative of me of an artist, at least now in 2012. It's less 80s synth-pop influenced, it's quite an upbeat album, which I think has stemmed from the fact I have been DJing a lot, and listening to a lot of dance music."

On 15 January 2013, Little Boots confirmed that her second album was completed, and it would be released in March 2013. On the weekend of 23 and 24 February 2013, Little Boots made several posts on social media directing people to follow her Instagram account for an update that would reveal the album's artwork, culminating with the post late on 24 February with the album's cover, with the title revealed to be Nocturnes. A post earlier in the afternoon also revealed several tracks on the album, including the singles "Shake" and "Every Night I Say a Prayer", along with songs from live sets such as "Motorway" and "Crescendo" and other titles such as "Confusion", "Broken Record", "Beat Beat", "Strangers", "All for You" and "Satellites".

== Release ==
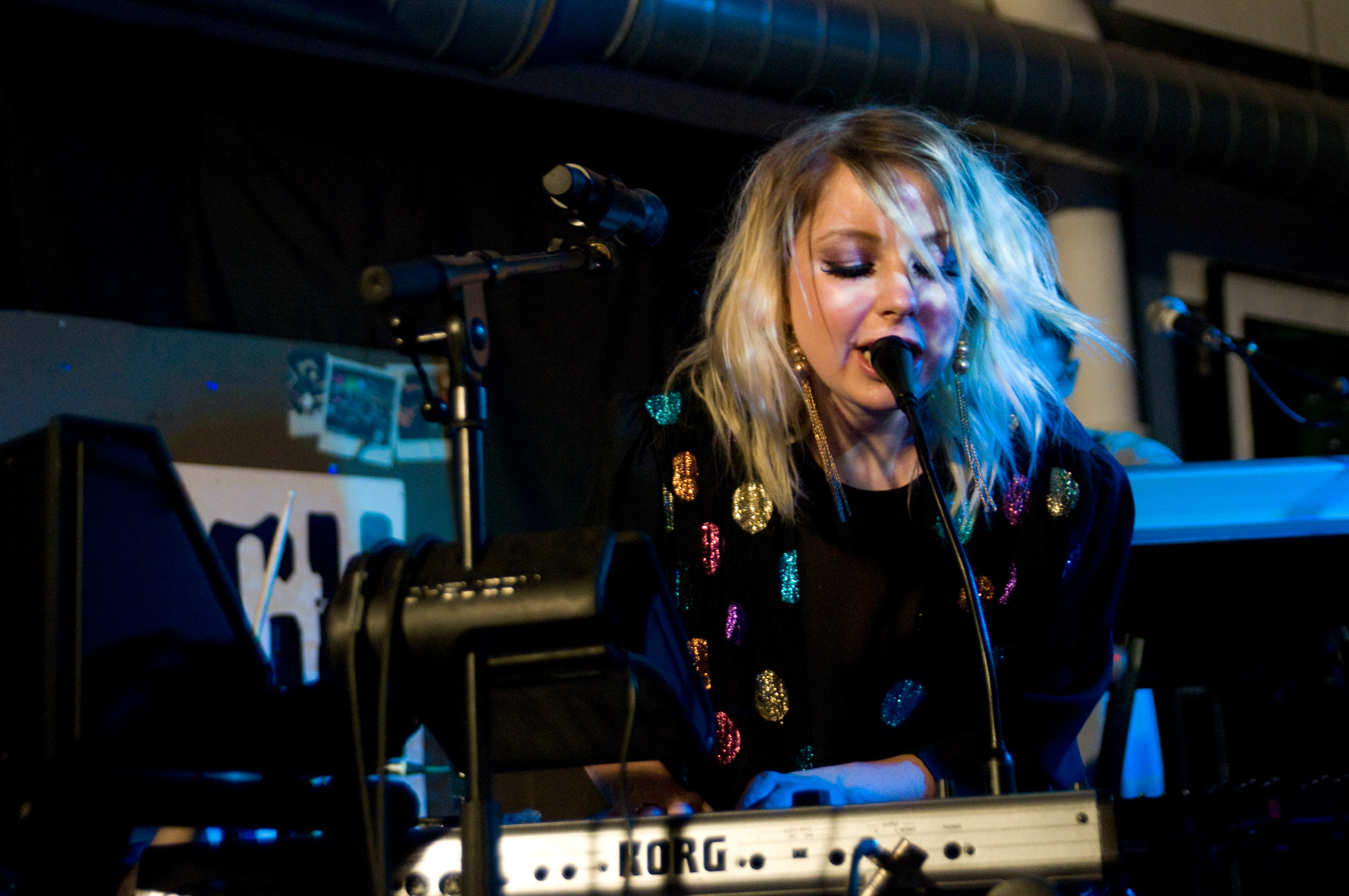
Little Boots performing at Rough Trade East in May 2013 for the album's launch

In October 2011, Little Boots released a mixtape titled Shake Until Your Heart Breaks, which included a then-untitled new composition. A month later, on 11 November, the song "Shake" premiered on BBC Radio 1. The following March, she released the new mixtape Into the Future which included another new song; "Every Night I Say a Prayer" was later released on 21 April 2012 as part of Record Store Day. This was followed up in June by the release of yet another mixtape titled Jubilee Disco and the song "Headphones". In January 2013, the song "Superstitious Heart" was released online and to record stores, performed by an artist named "LB" that media outlets recognised as Little Boots. Ultimately, "Headphones" and "Superstitious Heart" did not make the final cut for the Nocturnes track listing.

On 25 February 2013, the first taster from the album, "Motorway", was made available as a free download from Little Boots's website. "Broken Record" was released on 18 March 2013 as the album's first official single. The music video was filmed in March 2013 and premiered on 29 April. "Satellite" was released on 6 September 2013 as the album's second single, for which a self-directed music video was filmed at the Blackpool Tower.

The first 1,000 copies of the album were signed on CD or vinyl, which included a digital download and a limited edition Millionhands T-shirt.

== Critical reception ==
Professional ratings
Aggregate scores
Source	Rating
AnyDecentMusic?	6.5/10
Metacritic	69/100
Review scores
Source	Rating
AllMusic	3.5/5 stars
Clash	6/10
DIY	9/10
Drowned in Sound	8/10
The Guardian	4/5 stars
musicOMH	4/5 stars
NME	5/10
Pitchfork Media	6.0/10
Slant Magazine	3.5/5 stars
The Times	4/5 stars

Nocturnes received generally positive reviews from music critics. At Metacritic, which assigns a weighted mean rating out of 100 to reviews from mainstream critics, the album received an average score of 69, based on 24 reviews, which indicates "generally favorable reviews". Martyn Young of DIY described Nocturnes as "a classy album that brims with euphoria" and stated it "sounds fantastic throughout; there's just the right mix of intense dance floor dynamics and reverential sounds." The Guardian's Caroline Sullivan commented that Hesketh and Goldsworthy "keep the choruses and the fidgety effects coming through the closing 'Satellite', by which point it's inarguable that Nocturnes is one of the pop records of the year." Drowned in Sound's Sean Thomas found the album to be "more stripped back than her 2009 debut and with far simpler production", adding that "the combination of [Goldsworthy's] minimal sensibilities and the experience Victoria Hesketh garnered from recent DJing stints has created an altogether more coherent record." Chris Saunders of musicOMH called it "a very good pop record. It's fun, but accomplished too, and shows how Hesketh has taken her knocks, used them and come back bolder, brighter and better." AllMusic editor Matt Collar praised Nocturnes as "a sultry, late-night, slow burn of an album that finds the British electronic diva building upon the anthemic dance-oriented sound of her 2009 debut Hands."

Sal Cinquemani of Slant Magazine complimented the album's consistency, but felt that "Hesketh's shrewd choice of collaborators is often squandered on rather rudimentary song structures and lyrical ideas. That doesn't make Nocturnes any less enjoyable of a dance-pop album, but it's ultimately what will keep Little Boots from becoming the next Madonna, or the next Robyn for that matter." In a mixed review, Katherine St. Asaph of Pitchfork Media noted that "Nocturnes finds [Little Boots] settling on one that aspires to the distance of Saint Etienne's Sarah Cracknell or Sophie Ellis-Bextor. She's not quite there, and when her approach doesn't work, it really doesn't". Nevertheless, St. Asaph viewed the album as "a big improvement over Hands, [...] where even the biggest singles' hooks were made of saccharine, not sugar." Consequence of Sound's Dan Pfleegor opined that "[t]he trouble with Little Boots' choice in house music is that there's little room for experimentation. At times, lyrics rhyme just to be adhesive and the beats drone on and on and on", while concluding that "Little Boots can always be counted on to do what she does best though: keep us moving, keep us feeling, and, of course, keep us dancing." Clash's Jack Scourfield expressed, "For the most part, [...] Nocturnes feels a bit tired—'Broken Record' [...] even apes her own past hit 'Stuck on Repeat' lyrics-wise. But the results here feel somewhat less spirited." Despite writing that the album "features some catchy and classy electronic dance music", Kurt Murphy of the NME critiqued that "'Broken Record' sounds like a Eurovision-endorsed soundtrack to Cassack [sic] dancing and 'Satellites' is a limp version of Madonna's 'Ray of Light'."

== Track listing ==
No.	Title	Writer(s)	Producer(s)	Length
1.	"Motorway"	Victoria Hesketh; Jim Eliot	Tim Goldsworthy	4:59
2.	"Confusion"	Hesketh; Jeppe Laursen	Goldsworthy; Laursen^{[a]}	5:01
3.	"Broken Record"	Hesketh; Rick Nowels; Devrim Karaoglu	Goldsworthy	4:33
4.	"Shake"	Hesketh; James Ford	Ford	5:31
5.	"Beat Beat"	Hesketh; Pascal Gabriel	Goldsworthy	4:18
6.	"Every Night I Say a Prayer"	Hesketh; Andrew Butler	Goldsworthy	3:38
7.	"Crescendo"	Hesketh; Eliot	Goldsworthy	5:42
8.	"Strangers"	Hesketh; Magnus Lidehäll	Goldsworthy	6:39
9.	"All for You"	Hesketh; Butler	Goldsworthy; Butler	4:21
10.	"Satellite"	Hesketh; Ariel Rechtshaid	Goldsworthy; Rechtshaid	5:25

Japanese edition bonus track
No.	Title	Writer(s)	Length
11.	"Hush"	Hesketh; Rechtshaid	3:50

Notes

- ^{^a} signifies a co-producer

== Personnel ==
Credits adapted from the liner notes of Nocturnes.

- Little Boots – vocals
- Andrew Butler – production (track 9)
- John Dent – mastering
- Bruno Ellingham – bass (track 7); mixing (all tracks)
- Jack Featherstone – art direction
- James Ford – production (track 4)
- Tim Goldsworthy – production (tracks 1–3, 5–10); synthesiser (tracks 1, 3, 5–10)
- Charlie Jones – bass (track 5)
- Jeppe Laursen – co-production (track 2)
- Rory van Millingen – photography
- Darren Morris – keyboards (tracks 2, 5, 7, 10)
- Max Parsons – art direction
- Ariel Rechtshaid – production (track 10)

== Charts ==
Chart (2013)	Peak position
Irish Independent Albums (IRMA)	19
Scottish Albums (Official Charts)	78
UK Albums (Official Charts)	45
UK Independent Albums (Official Charts)	11
US Top Dance Albums (Billboard)	13
US Heatseekers Albums (Billboard)	8

== Release history ==
Region	Date	Format(s)	Label	Ref.
Australia	3 May 2013	CD; digital download	On Repeat	
United Kingdom	5 May 2013	Digital download	On Repeat	
France	6 May 2013	Digital download	On Repeat	
United Kingdom	6 May 2013	CD	On Repeat	
Italy	7 May 2013	CD; digital download	On Repeat	
Japan	7 May 2013	Digital download	Hostess	
United States	7 May 2013	CD; digital download	On Repeat	
Sweden	8 May 2013	CD; digital download	On Repeat	
Germany	10 May 2013	CD; digital download	On Repeat	
United Kingdom	20 May 2013	LP	On Repeat	
Japan	22 May 2013	CD	Hostess	
Netherlands	27 May 2013	CD	On Repeat	
Germany	28 May 2013	LP	On Repeat	
France	3 June 2013	CD	On Repeat	
