= The Pour House Music Hall =

- The Pour House
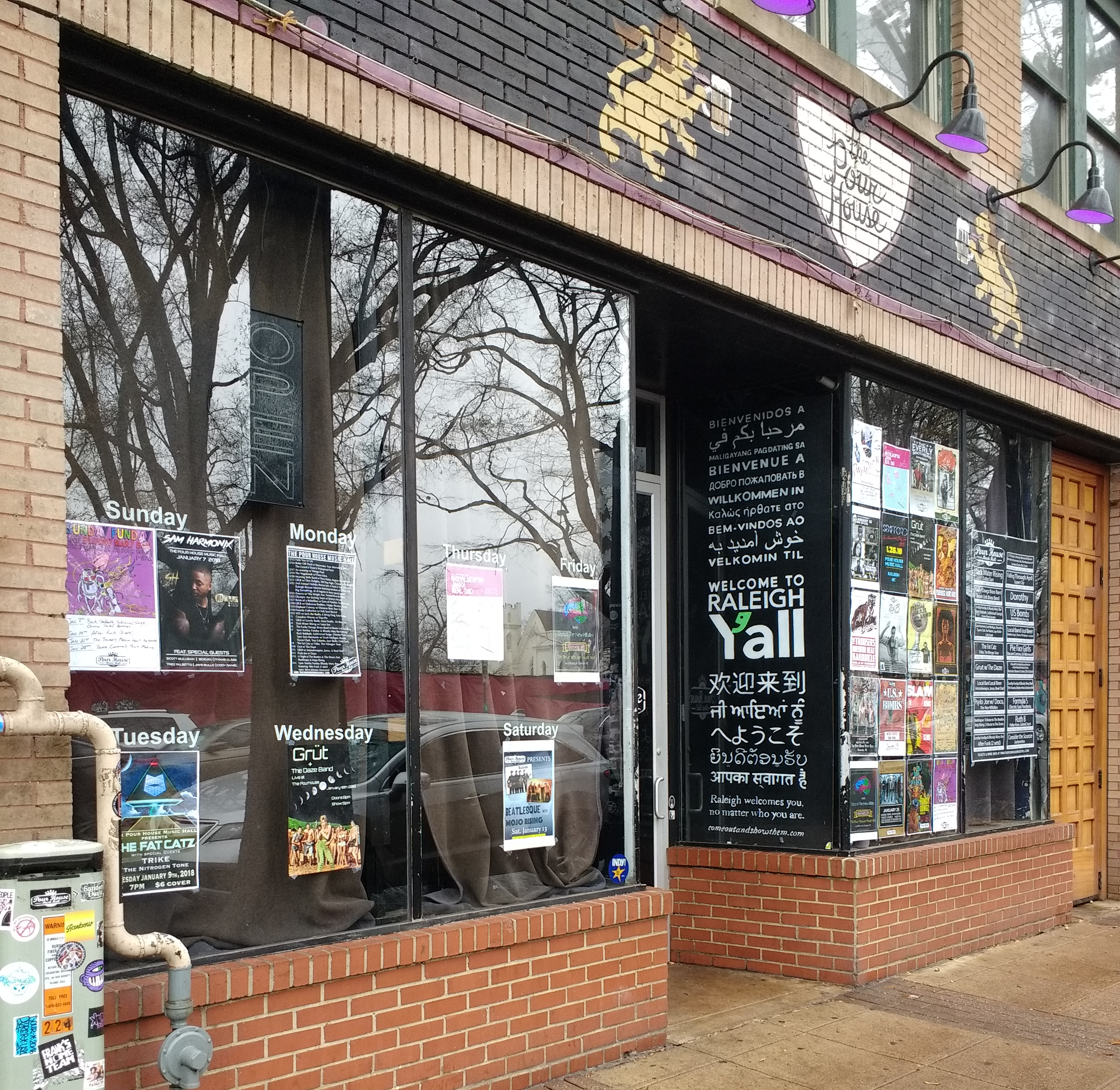

- Location within North Carolina
- Address: 224 S. Blount Street; Raleigh, North Carolina; United States
- Location: Raleigh, North Carolina, United States
- Coordinates: 35.77722°N 78.63667°W
- Owner: Eric Mullen (1997–2012); Adam Lindstaedt (2012–present)
- Type: music venue
- Seating type: Standing
- Capacity: 289
- Opened: 1997

Website
- www.thepourhousemusichall.com

The Pour House Music Hall (also known as The Pour House) is a music venue located in Raleigh, North Carolina. The Pour House was opened in 1997 by Eric Mullen but eventually changed hands in 2012 to current owner Adam Lindstaedt. For a brief period in 2011 Mullen had opened up a second location in Wilmington, North Carolina with some business partners but after a few months they severed ties and the Wilmington venue was renamed The Port City Theatre.

== History ==
The Pour House was opened in 1997 by Eric Mullen and two of his friends who Mullen eventually bought out. When the venue was originally opened it was a sofa-bar featuring live jazz with the music as background entertainment. They had 30 beers on tap and didn't serve any liquor. On the first floor of the venue were the couches, bar, and live jazz; on the second floor were pool tables and dart boards. The Pour House slowly transformed into a music venue after one night when a local band suggested moving around the furniture and playing towards the front of the bar. The venue got rid of the couches but still has 30 beers on tap and now also serves liquor drinks including cocktails.

In 2012, Eric Mullen made a deal to give half of The Pour House to Adam Lindstaedt with a plan to eventually transfer full ownership. After Lindstaedt became the sole owner of the venue, he has made a point of bringing in a wide variety of genres.

In December 2015 The Pour House took over hosting duties for Local Band Local Beer after the closing of Raleigh restaurant Tir Na Nog. Local Band Local Beer is a free weekly event which began in 2007 in collaboration with North Carolina State University radio station WKNC-FM that hosts North Carolina musicians and locally brewed beer.

== Controversy ==
In March 2015 venue owner Adam Lindstaedt began receiving threats of violence because he had booked a band from Portland, Oregon named Black Pussy. The show had been booked for months but the band's name came to light after a series of articles about the controversy behind the band's name. This caused patrons of the bar to be offended by the name Black Pussy and led to many calling for a boycott of The Pour House. Due to the threats of violence Lindstaedt canceled the show, which the band stated was their second canceled gig due to their name.

Black Pussy released a statement about the incident "Black Pussy is fully supportive and respectful of every opinion in the growing conversation regarding their name, and welcomes fans of every race, gender, creed, sexual orientation and preference of intoxicant to join the party. With that said, it is with deep regret that we must announce that there have been serious threats of violence and vandalism against the promoter, the staff, and the venue of The Pour House in Raleigh, North Carolina, and out of respect for the venue and the safety of everyone involved, the March 25th show has been cancelled."
