= Testify (The Knocks EP) =

EP by The Knocks
- Released: February 3, 2017
- Recorded: 2016
- Genre: Electronic; EDM
- Label: Big Beat; Neon Gold
- Producer: The Knocks; Styalz Fuego; MNEK

The Knocks chronology
55.5 (The Knocks VIP Mix) EP (2016)	Testify (2017)	New York Narcotic (2018)

Singles from Testify
- 1. "Heat" Released: October 20, 2016; 2. "Trouble" Released: January 13, 2017; 3. "Lie" Released: January 27, 2017

Testify is the fifth extended play by The Knocks. It was released on February 3, 2017, through Big Beat and Neon Gold Records. It features vocals from Sam Nelson Harris of X Ambassadors, Absofacto, MNEK, Delacey, Tayla Parx and Jerm.

== Background ==
On January 4, 2017, they released the trailer for their fifth extended play, which was announced under the title Testify. A couple days later, they announced their second single from the EP, entitled "Trouble", featuring Absofacto, which is the solo project of musician Jonathan Visger; currently a member of American rock band Mason Proper. The song itself was released on January 13.

== Track listing ==
No.	Title	Writer(s)	Producer(s)	Length
1.	"Worship" (featuring MNEK)	Benjamin Ruttner; James Patterson; Kaelyn Behr; Uzoechi Emenike; Sam Nelson Harris	The Knocks; MNEK; Styalz Fuego	3:35
2.	"Heat" (featuring Sam Nelson Harris)	Ruttner; Patterson; Behr; Harris	The Knocks; Fuego	3:52
3.	"Trouble" (featuring Absofacto)	Ruttner; Patterson; Jonathan Visger	The Knocks; Absofacto	4:51
4.	"Feel Love" (featuring Delacey)	Ruttner; Patterson; Brittany Amaradio; Kyle Shearer	The Knocks	4:01
5.	"Your Eyes" (featuring Tayla Parx)	Ruttner; Patterson; Behr; Taylor Parks; Fransisca Hall; Finneas O'Connell; Billie O'Connell	The Knocks; Fuego	3:28
6.	"Lie" (featuring Jerm)	Ruttner; Patterson; Behr; Jaramye Daniels	The Knocks; Fuego	3:09
