= When the Night (album) =

Studio album by St. Lucia
- Released: October 8, 2013
- Genre: Pop; synthpop; electropop; new wave
- Length: 55:21
- Label: Neon Gold; Columbia
- Producer: Jean-Philip Grobler; Jonas Raabe

St. Lucia chronology
When the Night (2013)	Matter (2016)

Professional ratings
Review scores
Source	Rating
Allmusic	4/5 stars
Consequence of Sound	C+
PopMatters	8/10 stars

When the Night is the debut studio album by New York City-based musician St. Lucia. It was released on October 8, 2013 through Neon Gold Records and Columbia Records. The album has charted in the United States.

== Background ==
The original version of "Call Me Up" was recorded in the bathroom of a Tommy Bahama in Florida. Grobler explained during a performance in Boston that he was self-conscious about the way the words sounded in the song, "They always sound kind of mumbly." However, he said that he "realized it's a tender love song in a way, and that I wanted the lyrics to feel that way because it almost feels like when you’re whispering words into your lover's ear or something."

== Promotion ==
In December 2012, a music video for "September" was released. It was directed by Francis. The song appeared in the soundtrack for EA Sports football video game, FIFA 13.

A music video for "Elevate", directed by NORTON, was released on September 19, 2013.

The song "Elevate" appears in the soundtrack for Konami football video game PES 2016.

== Track listing ==
All tracks are written by Jean-Philip Grobler, except where noted.

No.	Title	Writer(s)	Length
1.	"The Night Comes Again"	Grobler; Garrett Ienner	4:07
2.	"The Way You Remember Me"		4:25
3.	"Elevate"	Ross Clark; Grobler	5:08
4.	"Wait for Love"		3:34
5.	"All Eyes on You"		4:27
6.	"Closer Than This"		3:28
7.	"Call Me Up"		5:13
8.	"We Got It Wrong"		4:57
9.	"September"		5:46
10.	"Too Close"	Grobler; Jonas Raabe	6:56
11.	"When the Night"		7:20

Spotify Bonus Track
No.	Title	Length
12.	"Closer Than This - Live From the Spotify House in Austin"	4:09

Deluxe version
No.	Title	Length
12.	"Forgiveness"	4:45
13.	"Cold Case"	4:26
14.	"Out Tonight"	3:02

== Personnel ==
Credits adapted from AllMusic

Musicians

- St. Lucia (Jean-Philip Grobler) – vocals
- Jonas Raabe – keyboards
- Ross Clark – guitar, bass guitar
- Nicholas Paul - keyboards, piano
- Garrett Ienner – guitar
- Patricia Beranek – keyboards, percussion, vocals
- Nick Brown – drums
- Chris Zane – drums
- Sonny Ratcliff – drums
- Drew Cappotto – percussion
- Alan Ferber – trombone
- Ari Bragi Kárason – trumpet
- Nathan Koci – French Horn
- Mike Ruby – saxophone
- Tim Sullivan – saxophone

Technical personnel

- Jean-Philip Grobler – engineering, production
- Jonas Raabe – production
- Chris Zane – engineering, mixing, additional production
- Andy Baldwin – drum engineering, mixing
- Sonny Ratcliff – drum engineering
- Benjamin Gebert – engineering, percussion engineering
- Rich Costey – mixing
- Greg Calbi – mastering
- James Iha – executive production
- Chris Kasych – Pro-Tools

Additional personnel

- Derek Davies – A&R
- Carson Donnelly – A&R
- Andrew Keller – A&R
- Lizzy Plapinger – A&R
- Jeff Gilligan – art direction, design
- Leif Podhajsky – cover design, illustrations
- Bo Hill – assistant

== Charts ==
Chart (2013)	Peak position
US Billboard 200	191
US Top Heatseekers Albums (Billboard)	6

== Release history ==
Region	Date	Format	Label
United States	October 8, 2013	CD; LP; digital download	Neon Gold; Columbia
Poland	November 12, 2013	CD; LP	Sony Music
Germany	November 22, 2013	CD	Sony Music
