= All About You (The Knocks song) =

2021 single by The Knocks featuring Foster The People

Single by The Knocks featuring Foster the People
- Released: October 28, 2020
- Genre: Breakbeat; acid house
- Length: 3:36
- Label: Big Beat
- Songwriters: Styalz Fuego; Benjamin Ruttner; James Patterson; Luke O'Loughlin; Mark Foster
- Producers: Styalz Fuego; The Knocks

The Knocks singles chronology
"Bodies" (2020)	"All About You" (2020)	"Fireworks" (2021)

Foster the People singles chronology
"The Things We Do" (2020)	"All About You" (2020)	"Broken Jaw" (2021)

Music video
- "All About You" on YouTube

"All About You" is a song by American EDM duo The Knocks featuring American indie pop band Foster the People, released on October 28, 2020. The song was written by Styalz Fuego, Benjamin Ruttner, James Patterson, Luke O'Loughlin and Mark Foster, the lead singer of Foster the People, and produced by Fuego and The Knocks. It also marks the second collaboration between the artists.

== Background ==
Mark Foster, lead singer of Foster the People, said in a press release: "When I was in New York a few months ago, I popped over to say hi to The Knocks guys, as I hadn't caught up with them in a while. [...] We were hanging at their studio, playing various things for each other that we had been working on. One of those songs was a rough instrumental version of 'All About You'. I put a bass line and a chord change on it, and was surprised when they sent me a fully realized song a few months later." He then completed the track remotely at his studio located in Los Angeles.

== Content ==
Ben Ruttner of the Knocks explained in an interview that the song is based on a beat made from T. L. Barrett's song "Like a Ship" (1988). The song is written in the key of G♯ Major, with a tempo of 102 beats per minute.

== Music video ==
The music video was released on January 13, 2021, and directed by Nathan R. Smith. It showcases Foster and others "walk[ing] along dark city streets" appearing "downtrodden".

== Charts ==
=== Weekly charts ===
Weekly chart performance for "All About You"
Chart (2020–2021)	Peak position
Canada Rock (Billboard)	38
US Hot Dance/Electronic Songs (Billboard)	20
US Rock & Alternative Airplay (Billboard)	33

=== Year-end charts ===
Year-end chart performance for "All About You"
Chart (2021)	Position
US Hot Dance/Electronic Songs (Billboard)	64
