= 55 (album) =

Album by The Knocks

Studio album by the Knocks
- Released: March 4, 2016
- Recorded: 2013–16
- Genre: Electronic; EDM
- Length: 58:00
- Label: Big Beat, Neon Gold
- Producer: The Knocks; Mike Del Rio; Captain Cuts; Styalz Fuego; Matthew Koma; Josh Gudwin

The Knocks chronology
So Classic EP (2015)	55 (2016)	55.5 (The Knocks 55.5 VIP Mix) EP (2016)

Singles from 55
- 1. "Classic" Released: September 17, 2014; 2. "Dancing with Myself" Released: March 9, 2015; 3. "Collect My Love" Released: August 28, 2015; 4. "I Wish (My Taylor Swift)" Released: October 29, 2015; 5. "Comfortable" Released: March 7, 2016; 6. "Kiss the Sky" Released: March 17, 2016; 7. "New York City" Released: March 21, 2016

55 is the debut studio album written and produced by New York City-based electronic music duo the Knocks and was released via Neon Gold and Big Beat on March 4, 2016. It features vocals and collaborations from the likes of Fetty Wap, Cam'ron, Wyclef Jean, Carly Rae Jepsen, Matthew Koma, Magic Man, Alex Newell, POWERS, Phoebe Ryan, Justin Tranter, Walk the Moon, and X Ambassadors.

== Reception ==
Spin rated the album 8 out of 10.

== 55.5 (The Knocks VIP Mix) ==
55.5 (The Knocks VIP Mix)

EP by the Knocks
- Released: July 8, 2016
- Recorded: 2016
- Genre: Electronic; EDM
- Label: Big Beat, Neon Gold
- Producer: The Knocks

The Knocks chronology
55 (2016)	55.5 (The Knocks VIP Mix) (2016)	Testify EP (2017)

Singles from 55.5 (The Knocks VIP Mix)
- 1. "Classic" Released: April 28, 2016; 2. "Love Me Like That" Released: May 26, 2016; 3. "Tied to You" Released: June 6, 2016; 4. "Best for Last" Released: June 24, 2016; 5. "Time" Released: July 8, 2016

55.5 (The Knocks VIP Mix) is the fourth extended play produced by New York City based electronic music duo the Knocks, which was released on 8 July 2016. The extended play is set as a remixed spin-off to the duo's debut album 55, containing remixes of five songs from the album.

Around the time the duo embarked on their American tour, they began to record the remixed versions of the songs and began teasing the extended play.

The EP was initially planned to be released on 29 April 2016, but was ultimately pushed back to 8 July 2016. In its place on that date, the duo released the EP's lead single, a remixed of their track "Classic" featuring vocals from alt-pop duo POWERS.

The second single from the EP, which was a remix of the song "Love Me Like That" featuring vocals from Carly Rae Jepsen, was released 26 May 2016. This was during the duo's tour with Justin Bieber and Ellie Goulding.

The third single, a remix of "Tied To You" featuring vocals from pop songwriter Justin Tranter, was released on 6 June 2016.

Whilst the duo were embarking on another American tour serving as guest performers for The 1975, the fourth single, a remix of "Best for Last" featuring vocals from American electronic band Walk the Moon, was released on 24 June 2016.

On 7 July 2016, the Knocks announced the release date of 8 July 2016, and revealed that the EP was to include the official release of their last remix from the EP of the song "Time".

== Track listing ==
55
No.	Title	Writer(s)	Producer(s)	Length
1.	"New York City" (featuring Cam'ron)	Benjamin Ruttner; James Patterson; Cameron Ezike Giles	The Knocks	3:07
2.	"Time"	Ruttner; Bernard Fowler; Patterson; Lawrence Philpot; Michael De Beneditcus; Michael Francis Gonzalez	Mike Del Rio; The Knocks	5:11
3.	"Classic" (featuring POWERS)	Ruttner; Crista Russo; Patterson; Gonzalez	Mike Del Rio; The Knocks	4:09
4.	"Kiss the Sky" (featuring Wyclef Jean)	Ruttner; Patterson; Madeline Nelson; Ross Clark; Wyclef Jeanelle Jean	The Knocks; Ryan McMahon^{[a]}	3:35
5.	"Dancing with Myself"	Ruttner; Patterson; Gonzalez; Clark; Thomas John Eickmann	Mike Del Rio; The Knocks	4:09
6.	"Comfortable" (featuring X Ambassadors)	Ruttner; Patterson; Sam Nelson Harris	The Knocks	4:02
7.	"I Wish (My Taylor Swift)" (with Matthew Koma)	Ruttner; Patterson; Matthew Bair; Clark	The Knocks; Matthew Koma^{[a]}	3:44
8.	"Collect My Love" (featuring Alex Newell)	Autumn Rowe; Ruttner; Christopher Paul Caswell; Patterson; Rozzi Crane	The Knocks	3:16
9.	"The Key"	Ruttner; Patterson; Phoebe Ryan; Clark	The Knocks	3:11
10.	"Tied to You" (featuring Justin Tranter)	Ruttner; Cole Whittle; Patterson; Justin Tranter	The Knocks	4:21
11.	"Love Me Like That" (featuring Carly Rae Jepsen)	Ruttner; Carly Rae Jepsen; Caswell; Hannah Robinson; Patterson; Martina Sorbara; Richard Phillips; Clark	The Knocks; Josh Gudwin^{[a]}	4:31
12.	"Cinderella" (featuring Magic Man)	Alex Caplow; Ruttner; Patterson; Clark; Harris; Sam Lee	The Knocks	4:09
13.	"Purple Eyes" (featuring Phoebe Ryan)	Ruttner; Patterson; Ryan	The Knocks	3:03
14.	"Best for Last" (featuring Walk the Moon)	Ruttner; Patterson; Nicholas Petricca	The Knocks	4:27
15.	"Classic (Remix)" (featuring Fetty Wap & POWERS)	Ruttner; Russo; Patterson; Gonzalez; Willie Maxwell II	The Knocks	3:40
Total length:				58:00

55 – Japanese Edition
No.	Title	Writer(s)	Producer(s)	Length
16.	"Endisco (エンディスコ)"	Ruttner; Patterson; Alexander Drury; Ryan McMahon; Benjamin Berger	The Knocks; Captain Cuts	4:16
17.	"The One (それ)" (featuring Sneaky Sound System)	Ruttner; Patterson; Angus McDonald; Connie Thembi Mitchell	The Knocks	4:22
18.	"Flow (フロー)" (featuring Adeline Michele)	Ruttner; Patterson; Michele; Kaelyn Behr	The Knocks; Styalz Fuego	4:02

55.5 (The Knocks VIP MIx) – EP
No.	Title	Writer(s)	Length
1.	"Classic" (featuring POWERS)	Benjamin Ruttner; Cristia Russo; James Patterson; Michael Francis Gonzalez	4:00
2.	"Love Me Like That" (featuring Carly Rae Jepsen)	Ruttner; Carly Rae Jepsen; Christopher Paul Caswell; Hannah Robinson; Patterson; Martina Sorbara; Richard Phillips; Ross Clark	6:16
3.	"Tied to You" (featuring Justin Tranter)	Ruttner; Cole Whittle; Patterson; Justin Tranter	6:35
4.	"Best for Last" (featuring Walk the Moon)	Ruttner; Patterson; Nicholas Petricca	5:46
5.	"Time"	Ruttner; Bernard Fowler; Patterson; Lawrence Philpot; Michael De Beneditcus; Gonzalez	5:31

Notes

- ^{^[a]} signifies a vocal producer

== Personnel ==
- Benjamin Ruttner – producer (all tracks), lyrics (all tracks), programming (all tracks)
- James Patterson – producer (all tracks), lyrics (all tracks), programming (all tracks), vocals (tracks 2, 5 and 9), background vocals (tracks 3 and 4)
- Justin Pilbrow – mixer (track 1)
- John Horesco – mastering (all tracks)
- Miles Walker – mixer (tracks 2, 3, 4, 5, 7, 8, 9, 10, 11, 12, 13, 14 and 15)
- Ryan Jumper – assistant mixing engineer (tracks 2, 3, 4, 5, 7, 8, 9, 10, 11, 12, 13, 14 and 15)
- Wes Edmonds – recording engineer (track 4)
- David Perlik Molinari – mixer (track 6)
- Alex De Turk – mastering (track 6)
- Josh Gudwin – additional recording engineer, mixer, vocal producer (track 11)
- Cam'ron – vocals, lyrics (track 1)
- Mike Del Rio – producer (tracks 2 and 5), lyrics (tracks 2, 3, 5 and 15)
- Leon's Inner voice (LIV) Gospel Choir – backing vocals (tracks 1, 2, 8)
- Julia Tepper – additional vocals (track 1)
- Deva Mahal – vocals (track 2), additional vocals (tracks 1)
- Bernard Fowler – lyrics (track 2)
- Lawrence Philpot – lyrics (track 2)
- Michael de Benedictus – lyrics (track 2)
- Cristia Ru – vocals, lyrics (track 3 and 15)
- Fetty Wap – vocals, lyrics (track 15)
- Phoebe Ryan – vocals, (track 13), background vocals (tracks 4, 9), lyrics (tracks 9, 13)
- Ryan McMahon – producer, lyrics (track 16), vocal producer (track 4)
- Benjamin Berger – producer, lyrics (track 16)
- Madeline Nelson – lyrics (track 4)
- Ross Clark – lyrics (tracks 4, 5, 7, 9, 11, 12), guitar (tracks 5, 8, 9, 10, 12, 13)
- Wyclef Jean – vocals, lyrics (track 4)
- Sophie Hawley – background vocals (track 5)
- Thomas John Eichmann – lyrics (track 5)
- Sam Nelson Harris – vocals/background vocals (track 6), lyrics (tracks 6, 12)
- Matthew Koma – vocals, lyrics, vocal producer (track 7)
- Autumn Rowe – lyrics (track 8)
- Christopher Paul Caswell – lyrics (track 8, 11), strings (track 11)
- Rozzi Crane – lyrics (track 8)
- Alex Newell – vocals (track 8)
- Cole Whittle – lyrics (track 10)
- Somi – background vocals (track 10)
- Benny Benack III – horn (track 10)
- Jake Goldbas – percussion (track 10)
- Justin Tranter – vocals, lyrics (track 10)
- Martina Sorbara – background vocals, lyrics (track 11)
- Hannah Robinson – lyrics (track 11)
- Richard X – lyrics (track 11)
- Carly Rae Jepsen – vocals, lyrics (track 11)
- Alex Caplow – vocals, lyrics (track 12)
- Sam Lee – lyrics (track 12)
- Nicholas Petricca – vocals, lyrics (track 14)
- Alexander Drury – lyrics (track 16)
- Sneaky Sound System – vocals, lyrics (track 17)
- Adeline Michele – vocals, lyrics (track 18)
- Styalz Fuego – producer, lyrics (track 18)
