= Magic Man (band) =

American indie pop band (2010–2019)

- Origin: Boston, Massachusetts
- Genres: Electronic rock, indie pop, synthpop
- Years active: 2010–2019
- Label: None
- Past members: Alex Caplow; Sam Vanderhoop Lee; Nolan Robert; Will Radin; Daniel Radin; Justine Bowe; Gabe Goodman; Joey Sulkowski
- Website: magicmanmusic.com

Magic Man was a two-piece American major label electronic rock band from Boston, formed in 2010 by Alex Caplow (vocals) and Sam Lee (guitars and keyboard). They later added high school friend Gabe Goodman (bass) and college friends Justine Bowe (keyboards) and Joey Sulkowski (drums), enabling the New England–based group to become a full-fledged band. They released the EP You Are Here in September 2013, followed by their first major full-length release, Before the Waves, on July 8, 2014, under Columbia Records. On July 10, 2015, Magic Man announced the departure of Goodman, Bowe, and Sulkowski, returning to their original two-piece lineup.

== History ==
=== Real Life Color (2010) ===
During the summer following their freshman year in university, Alex Caplow and Sam Lee joined WWOOF (World Wide Opportunities on Organic Farms) and traveled around France, trading labor for room and board on a series of French organic farms. When visiting a circus festival, they met a French close to their age, who claimed to be an amateur magician and called himself "Magic Man". He later became one of their first friends in France and the inspiration for the band's name. Alex and Sam used these experiences to influence the beginnings of Magic Man's music. As a laptop-based group, the duo favored dance-y synth-pop and began creating music. Under this lineup, Magic Man released their self-produced debut album, Real Life Color, on January 25, 2010.

=== You Are Here (2013) ===
With the changes to the lineup bringing Justine Bowe, Joey Sulkowski, and Daniel Radin to the band, Magic Man began to work on an EP. They released the EP, You Are Here, in September 2013. They then embarked on a U.S. tour supporting Walk the Moon, followed by an immediate mini-tour supporting Sir Sly.

=== Before the Waves (2014–2015) ===
In January 2014, Magic Man toured for a month with New Politics and Sleeper Agent for New Politics's headlining tour. Radin left in early 2014, to play with his other band, The Novel Ideas, and he was replaced by Gabe Goodman. In February 2014, the single "Paris" debuted at #39 on Billboard's Alternative Songs chart, eventually peaking at No. 33. The song was accompanied by a music video. In March 2014, the song hit #1 on Alt Nation's Alt 18 Countdown. That same month, the band performed at the South by Southwest music festival. Shortly thereafter, they embarked on a west coast U.S. tour as headliners, to be followed by appearances on The Gospel Tour in support of Walk the Moon and Panic! at the Disco.

On July 8, 2014, the group released its debut album Before the Waves. The record was produced by Alex Aldi (Passion Pit, Holy Ghost!), who also worked with the band 2013's You Are Here EP, and written by Alex Caplow and Sam Lee. In support of Before the Waves, Magic Man embarked on their first headlining tour, joining The Gospel Tour alongside Panic! at the Disco and Walk the Moon for the duration of the summer.

=== Return to Original Lineup and Third Studio Album (2015–2019) ===
Following Magic Man's first headlining tour in spring 2015, the group announced they had begun writing their third studio album. On July 10, Magic Man announced the departure of Justine Bowe, Gabe Goodman, and Joey Sulkowski, returning the group to their original lineup of Alex Caplow and Sam Lee. On January 19, the band announced their upcoming Hotline Spring Tour, touring with indie pop bands the Griswolds and Panama Wedding. The band also appeared as a collaboration on The Knocks' title "Cinderella", on their debut album 55, released on March 4, 2016. Magic Man's fourth studio album was originally going to be released in 2016, under a rumored name of "After the Storm." After years of speculation that the band has split, on August 8, 2019, the band announced their split via posts on social media.

== Touring members ==
- Fran Litterski – keyboards, vocals (since 2015)
- Pepe Hidalgo Ramos – drums, percussion (since 2016)
- Austin Luther – bass guitar (since 2016)

== Press ==
The band has been featured in Rolling Stone, Glamour, the Boston Globe, and GQ, whose review described 'Before the Waves' as "12 tracks of alt joy". 'Before the Waves' was named one of the best albums of 2014 by local music publication Sound of Boston.

== Discography ==
=== Studio albums ===
List of studio albums, with year released
Title	Album details
Real Life Color	Released: January 25, 2010; Format: CD, Digital download
Before the Waves	Released: July 8, 2014; Format: Vinyl, CD, Digital download

=== Extended plays ===
List of extended plays, with year released
Title	Album details
You Are Here EP	Released: September 6, 2013; Format: CD, Vinyl, Digital download
