= Carnival III: The Fall and Rise of a Refugee =

Studio album by Wyclef Jean
- Released: September 15, 2017
- Recorded: 2016–2017
- Genre: Hip-hop
- Length: 42:45
- Label: Heads Music; Sony Music; Legacy Recordings
- Producer: Wyclef Jean; The Knocks; Supah Mario; Phillip Fender; Motiv; Cards; Sidney Swift

Wyclef Jean chronology
J'ouvert (2017)	Carnival III: The Fall and Rise of a Refugee (2017)	Wyclef Jean Inspired By... (2017)

Singles from Carnival III: The Fall and Rise of a Refugee
- 1. "Fela Kuti" Released: June 22, 2017; 2. "What Happened to Love" Released: June 22, 2017; 3. "Borrowed Time" Released: September 6, 2017; 4. "Turn Me Good" Released: October 17, 2017; 5. "Trapicabana" Released: December 5, 2017

Professional ratings
Review scores
Source	Rating
Cult MTL	3.5/10 stars
Exclaim!	6/10 stars
Pop Magazine	4/5 stars

Carnival III: The Fall and Rise of a Refugee is the eighth studio-album by Haitian singer-songwriter and rapper Wyclef Jean. It was released on September 15, 2017.

== Personnel ==
Carnival III: The Fall and Rise of a Refugee was Jean's first album recorded without his longtime co-producer Jerry Duplessis. Instead tracks were produced by Jean and several relatively unknown co-producers. Similarly, unlike previous Wyclef Jean albums, there were few high-profile appearances: the best known featured artistes were Lunchmoney Lewis and Emeli Sande.

== Singles ==
On June 22, 2017, Jean released the first single from the album, titled "Fela Kuti", along with another song, titled "What Happened to Love". On July 14, 2017, Wyclef released the "Fela Kuti" official lyric video.

== Critical reception ==
Mai Perkins of Pop Magazine wrote in a positive review, "Carnival 3 is right on time. Wyclef’s songwriting is ripe with empowerment and resilience. The album is a concise 12-track body of work with a handful of features and tributes to the likes of Fela Kuti as well as to the hallmarks of hip-hop." Mr. Wavvy of Cult MTL offered a negative critique, describing the album as "a cheap nostalgia cash-in".

== Promotion ==
On December 25, 2017, Jean announced The Carnival Tour on social media. It started on February 9, 2018, and ended on October 26, 2018, after 56 shows.

== Track listing ==
No.	Title	Writer(s)	Producer(s)	Length
1.	"Slums" (featuring Jazzy Amra, H1DaHook and Marx Solvila)	Wyclef Jean; Madeline Nelson; Branden Washington; J. Deshazer; A. Kern; J. Washington	Wavie Boi; Jean^{[a]}	4:14
2.	"Turn Me Good"	Jean; Phillip Fender; Chris Aparri	DJ Flict	3:31
3.	"Borrowed Time"	Jean; Nelson	Jean; Alberto Vaccarino^{[a]}	3:35
4.	"Fela Kuti"	Jean; Nelson; J. Priester	Supah Mario	3:30
5.	"Warrior" (featuring T-Baby)	Jean; Fender; Sidney Swift; Alex Goodwin; Michael Onufrak	Swift; MOTIV; Mike O	3:06
6.	"Shotta Boys" (featuring Stix)	Jean; Nelson; B. Bailey; B. Washington	Jean; Wavie Boi; Vaccarino^{[a]}	3:54
7.	"Double Dutch" (featuring Eric Nimmer and D.L. Hughley)	Jean; Nelson	Jean; Vaccarino^{[a]}	3:23
8.	"What Happened to Love" (featuring LunchMoney Lewis and The Knocks)	Jean; Nelson; Benjamin Ruttner; James Patterson; Ross Clark; Jacob Kasher Hindlin	The Knocks	4:07
9.	"Carry On" (featuring Emeli Sandé)	Jean; Adele Emily Sandé	Jean; Leon Lacey; Vaccarino^{[a]}	3:09
10.	"Concrete Rose" (featuring Hannah Eggan and Izolan)	Jean; Nelson	Jean; Wavie Boi	3:25
11.	"Trapicabana" (featuring Riley)	Jean; Nelson; Edward Theodore Riley; E. Estefan; A. Chirino	Jean; Wavie Boi; Vaccarino^{[a]}	2:49
12.	"Thank God for the Culture" (featuring Marx Solvila, J'Mika and Leon Lacey)	Jean; Nelson; Patterson; M. Mitchell	Jean; Lacey^{[a]}	4:02
Total length:				42:45

Notes

- [a] signifies a co-producer.

== Charts ==
Chart (2017)	Peak position
US Billboard 200	112
US Top R&B/Hip-Hop Album Sales (Billboard)	14
US Rap Album Sales (Billboard)	8
