= The Knocks =

American electronic music duo

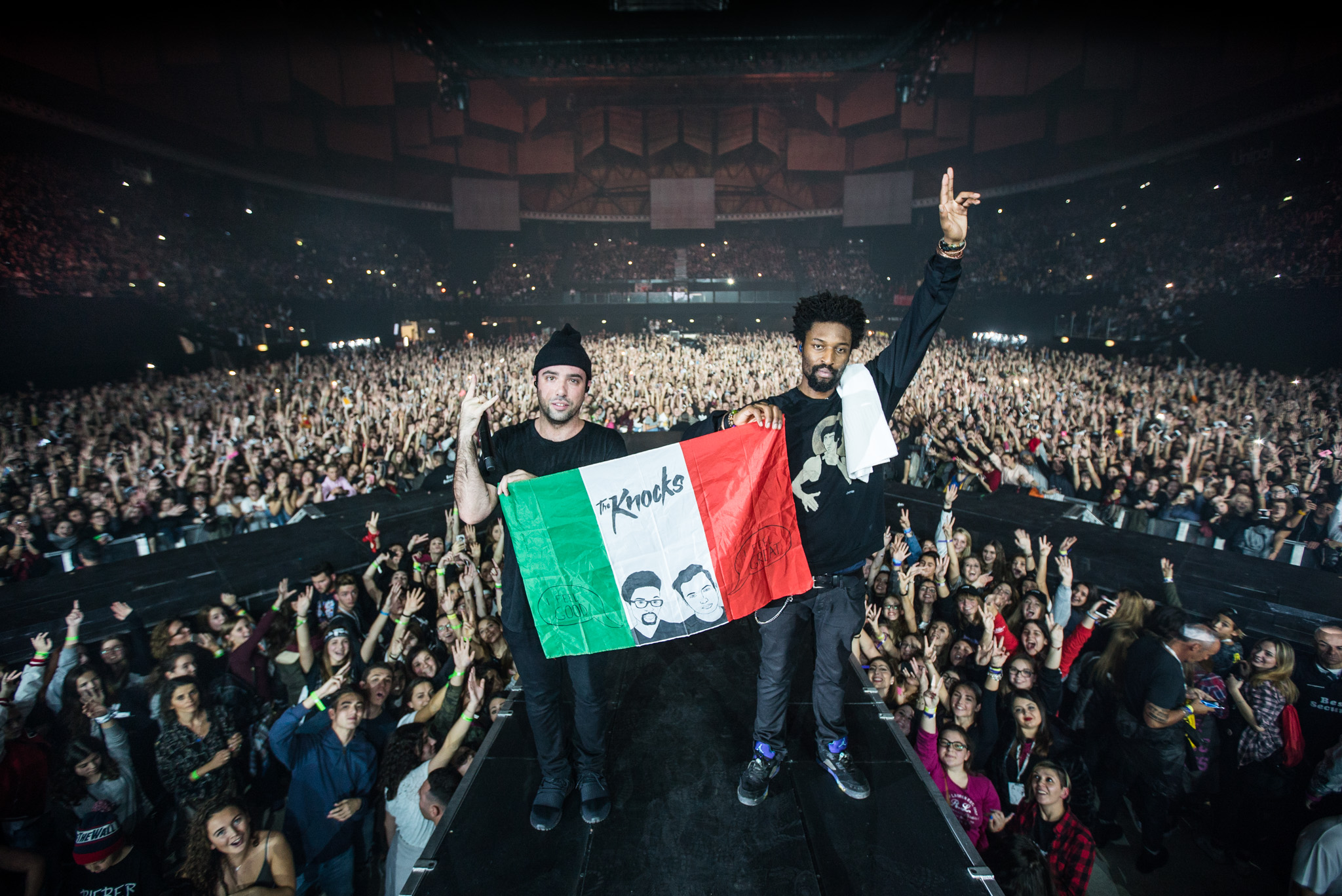
- The Knocks performing in Bologna in 2016.

Background information
- Origin: New York City, U.S.
- Genres: Electronic; future funk; EDM; nu-disco; dance
- Years active: 2008–present
- Labels: Big Beat; Neon Gold; Black Clay
- Members: Ben "B-Roc" Ruttner; James "Mr. JPatt" Patterson
- Website: theknocks.com

The Knocks is an American electronic music duo consisting of Ben "B-Roc" Ruttner and James "JPatt" Patterson. They have released 4 full-length albums (HISTORY, New York Narcotic, 55, Revelation) and 5 EPs (Melody & Silence, Summer Series: 2019, TESTIFY, So Classic, Magic) on record labels Big Beat Records, Neon Gold, Atlantic Records, and their labels Black Clay HeavyRoc Music. They are known for their singles "Classic" ft. Powers, "Ride or Die" ft. Foster the People, and "Bodies" ft. MUNA; along with their collaborations with Sofi Tukker ("Best Friend"), Purple Disco Machine ("Fireworks"), and ODESZA ("Love Letter"); and their remixes. They have been nominated for 2 GRAMMYS for Best Dance/Electronic Album Of The Year for their writing/production feature on the song "Love Letter" and for Best Remixed Recording, Non-Classical.

== History ==
The duo's name, "The Knocks", refers to the early days in their career when neighbors would knock on their door for playing music too loudly. They posted an "Origins" video on YouTube explaining in more detail. Before focusing on their own music and remixes, they produced beats and remixes for Katy Perry, Britney Spears, Mobb Deep, Nicki Minaj, Marina, Flo Rida, Sky Ferreira, Theophilus London, Ellie Goulding, and others.

In 2010, NME magazine named The Knocks as one of the "20 hottest producers in music".

=== 2010–15: Magic, Comfortable and So Classic EPs ===
Their single "Make It Better", released in 2010 on Neon Gold Records, was used in the US for a nationally televised Corona campaign. Their 2010 single "Dancing with the DJ" was an instant online success. Philadelphia hip hop band Chiddy Bang sampled The Knocks' "Blackout" for their single "Here We Go" (featuring Q-Tip) from their EP The Preview. Chiddy Bang subsequently sampled The Knocks' "When You've Got Music" and "Dancing with the DJ" for their mixtape Peanut Butter and Swelly. After the success of "Dancing With The DJ", their debut extended play, titled Magic was released in 2011.

In 2012, their cover of "Midnight City" by M83 featuring vocals by Mandy Lee, had 10,000 downloads in its first week on the website SoundCloud. In June, the duo took the number one spot on the website HypeMachine with the track "Learn to Fly", which reached 100,000 plays on SoundCloud within a week of its release. "Geronimo", a collaboration with French producer Fred Falke, was released on Kitsuné Records in July 2012. Later on in November 2012, the duo were featured alongside pop sensation St Lucia in Icona Pop's song "Sun Goes Down", which was released through their debut album Icona Pop. It was later revealed that the song was the duo's very first feature and co-produced track.

Afterwards, the duo released another single, featuring St. Lucia, titled "Modern Hearts", in the beginning of 2013 and earned the group another number-one placing on HypeMachine and reached the 100,000 plays mark on SoundCloud in four days. Within the same year, another single, titled "Comfortable", which featured vocals from X Ambassadors, was released, which was made the lead single of their second extended play, also titled "Comfortable", and was released shortly afterwards. The song also appeared in the 2015 film Focus.

In 2014, The Knocks released a single on Neon Gold Records/Big Beat Records, "Classic", featuring alt-pop duo POWERS. An official video was released that paid homage to video game The Sims. After it was released, they released a "Powers Sunset Version" which followed on shortly afterwards. This followed the songs "Dancing with Myself", "Collect My Love", featuring Alex Newell, and "Time" being released in early 2015. These tracks made up their third EP, titled So Classic, which was released in April 2015.

=== 2015–16: 55 ===
In November 2015, it was reported that The Knocks' debut album, titled 55, was to be released in January 2016, but was delayed to a later date sometime within the early months of the year. 55 features collaborations with Fetty Wap, Cam'ron, Wyclef Jean, Carly Rae Jepsen, Matthew Koma, Magic Man, Alex Newell, POWERS, Phoebe Ryan, Justin Tranter, Walk the Moon, and X Ambassadors.

Work for the album began to show in August 2015, when the single "Classic", released for their So Classic EP, was re-mastered and released as a 2015 re-release, adding new feature vocals from Fetty Wap along with POWERS. Afterwards, the duo went on to uploading a brand new music video for their collaboration with Alex Newell, titled "Collect My Love" and was classed as the second re-release from their So Classic EP. Both songs from the EP were considered to be a part of the new album at the time.

In the late months of 2015, The Knocks released a new single which was the first song outside of the So Classic EP and other projects that they had previously worked on, which sparked much interest about whether or not the duo was working on a new project. It was titled "I Wish (My Taylor Swift)" and was collaborated with Matthew Koma. It was eventually released in September 2015. The trailer for their debut album was released on their YouTube channel in November 2015, announcing it under the title 55. This teased the release of another single, titled "New York City", featuring vocals from Cam'ron, and was released the following month. Also in the same month, they re-released their official video for their 2013 single "Comfortable", featuring vocals from X Ambassadors, which was originally released under their 2013 Comfortable EP, and was classed as being another 2015 re-release.

Afterwards, in 2016, other projects also began to take place, such as their American "Route 55" Tour, which started on 15 January and ended on 13 February. Also, their first remix of the year was also released which was of Taylor Swift's single "Welcome to New York", taken from her album 1989. This was made the last bootleg of their "Summer Bootleg Series" which was released on SoundCloud. Remixes included Carly Rae Jepsen and her single "All That", and Skrillex and Diplo's collaborative single "Where Are Ü Now", featuring Justin Bieber.

Away from the announcements of such projects, before the release of their collaboration with Wyclef Jean, they announced further that the duo were made executive producers for Jean's 2016 album. Their first single of the year, titled "Kiss The Sky", featuring vocals from Wyclef Jean, was released in January 2016. During the premiere of the track, it was reported afterwards that the release date for the debut album 55 was confirmed to be 4 March 2016. This was followed on by the track listings from the album being released with single "Comfortable", featuring X Ambassadors, confirmed to also be on the album. This was also among all tracks from the So Classic EP being confirmed as songs on the album, as well as the collaborations with Matthew, Cam'ron and Wyclef.

During their tour in late January, the duo were interviewed by The Daily Nebraskan, stating news about the album 55. B-Roc, who makes up one half of the duo, stated, "I think the new album is similar to our So Classic EP. That's a good representation of what the album will be like." He also added that, "We didn't get to meet Fetty Wap, but Carly Rae was cool. Every artist we featured we previously had worked with or knew someone who knew them. The label didn't put them on our record; we wanted them on there." After the tour in February, they announced that the duo is hoping to arrange some shows in Europe, but details of that are yet to be revealed.

In mid-February 2016, the duo then released their next song from 55, titled "Best for Last", which features vocals from Walk the Moon. In just under a week after that song was released, the song "Love Me Like That", which features vocals from Carly Rae Jepsen, was made the next single from the album. The day after it was released, Carly Rae Jepsen's management company, "SB Projects", which was run by Scooter Braun, signed the duo to which afterwards they stated that they are "looking forward to this new chapter in our career."

Starting in the turn of the month, the duo launched a video series called "New York Knocks", which features the passers by reactions with songs off of the album 55. The episodes also revealed snippets or teasers of songs from the album.

55 was eventually released on 4 March 2016. On the day of its release, the duo uploaded every remaining unreleased song from the album onto their digital streaming profiles on SoundCloud, Spotify and YouTube. These songs were "The Key", "Dancing With Myself", which is a 2016 re-release of the 2015 version, "Tied To You", featuring vocals from Justin Tranter, "Cinderella", featuring vocals from Magic Man, and "Purple Eyes", featuring vocals from Phoebe Ryan.

=== 2016: Post success and collaborative projects ===
After the album's release, it reached number 2 on the US electronic charts.

A week later, the group teased the official video for single "New York City", featuring vocals from Cam'ron; the video was released the following week. It featured footage from the iPhone 6, which was promoted through the video. On the week of the teaser for the video they also premiered the official video for the acoustic version of single "Kiss the Sky", featuring vocals from Wyclef Jean.

At the end of March, the duo's second co-produced track was released (which was the first track co-produced by them since their collaboration with Icona Pop), which was of Wyclef Jean's comeback single "My Girl", featuring vocals from Sasha Mari. At the time, it was planned to be the lead single of Jean's eighth studio album, titled Carnival Vol. III (originally announced as Clefication) which the duo themselves later described as being so similar to their collaboration that they see it as being "a new Knocks album".

When approaching April, the album's success grew as the collaborations with Magic Man, Carly Rae Jepsen, and Wyclef Jean all received promotion from various advertisements and television shows across the US. The group also released two remixes, one of Phoebe Ryan's single "Chronic" and one of Justin Bieber's single "Company" from his 2015 album Purpose, both of which were released on SoundCloud.

Later in the month they announced that they were releasing remixes of songs from their debut album as part of a new project which materialized as their fourth EP, titled 55.5. Originally intended to be released on 29 April 2016, it was ultimately delayed until 24 June 2016. The first track from the EP, "Classic", was teased through SoundCloud shortly after the project's announcement, with the other tracks released periodically leading up to the final release dates.

In May 2016 the group toured with Justin Bieber on the Canadian branch of his Purpose tour, as well as with Ellie Goulding. Shortly after, they announced their collaboration with Norwegian electronic group Lemaitre on their single "We Got U", released on 17 June 2016. On the same day, Wyclef Jean released his second single produced by the group, titled "Hendrix".

In June 2016 the duo embarked on an American tour with The 1975, and on 7 July 2016 announced that 55.5 was expected to be released the following day.

In late August 2016, the duo revealed that they were returning the studio. They revealed on social media that they were collaborating with Carly Rae Jepsen on new material. The group, along with Jack Antonoff and Rami Yacoub, are expected to produce material for Jepsen's upcoming fourth studio album.

=== 2016–17: Testify EP ===
In October 2016, Whilst the duo were embarking on their European tour, they announced that a new single, titled "Heat", featuring vocals from X Ambassadors lead singer Sam Nelson Harris, was to be released on 21 October 2016. Upon release, the song was revealed to have been co-written and co-produced by Styalz Fuego. A week after, they conducted a surprise remix of Tove Lo's single "Cool Girl". The remix was released as a surprise track on her second studio album, titled Lady Wood, on 28 October 2016.

In late November 2016, it was revealed that the duo were working on their fifth extended play and that the single "Heat" was the lead single.

Then, in January 2017, they announced that they were going to be collaborating with MNEK on the EP.

On 4 January 2017, they released the trailer for their fifth extended play, which was announced under the title Testify. A couple days later, they announced their second single from the EP, titled "Trouble", featuring Absofacto.

On 21 January 2017, the duo released the official track list of their fifth extended play, confirmed to be released on 3 February 2017. It is expected to feature the likes of Delacey, Tayla Parx, and Jerm, as well as MNEK, Sam Nelson Harris and Absofacto. The EP was later released as planned. Billie Ellish and brother Finneas are credited on the song "Your Eyes."

Later on in the month, it was reported that Patterson is working with Julia Michaels on her debut major-label extended play, entitled Nervous System.

=== 2017–2018: Amelia Airhorn, the Mary Nixons and New York Narcotic ===
In June 2017, the Knocks collaborated with Skylar Spence to create a nu-disco project, reminiscent of Skylar's older work, under the moniker "Amelia Airhorn" in which they released their first single "Miracle". The project released their debut mixtape, entitled The Knocks & Skylar Spence Present...Amelia Airhorn, which was released later on in the month.

During the conception of the project, the Knocks announced that they were officially starting production on their next studio album. Rumoured collaborations are with the likes of St. Lucia and Dua Lipa.

On 22 June 2017, their affiliate Wyclef Jean announced the official lead single of his eighth studio album, entitled "What Happened to Love", featuring vocals from dance-pop/nu-disco rapper and songwriter LunchMoney Lewis. The duo were officially labelled as co-writers and producers of the track. This was also when the album's title was confirmed to be The Carnival Vol. III: The Fall & Rise of a Refugee which was scheduled to be released on 15 September 2017.

As of 6 July 2017, the duo have also worked with Levan Kali and Stuart Price, who previously remixed their 2017 single "Trouble", featuring Absofacto.

They have also started a punk-infused band with fellow musician Mat Zo called the Mary Nixons. Their debut single, entitled "Adrian" was released on 14 July 2017.

In August 2017, the duo stated that they were already working on the finishing touches and artwork for the album's lead single. On Twitter, they announced that "it would be the first Knocks single in almost a year when it comes out", succeeding their previous single "Lie", featuring Jerm.

In September 2017, the duo featured on Sofi Tukker's new single "Best Friend", alongside Nervo and Alisa Ueno. The duo teamed up with the group after producing remixes of their recent releases and being in sessions together working on the duo's second album. The song later appeared on the advertisement for the new iPhone X. The single gave the duo their first number one on Billboard's Dance/Mix Show Airplay chart in its January 20, 2018 issue.

Later on in the month, the duo posted a digital advertisement in Times Square, New York City on social media as part of the promotion and announcement of their new single, entitled "House Party", in collaboration with renowned production trio Captain Cuts. It was expected to be the lead single off of their second album and was released on 13 October 2017.

On 5 January 2018, the duo announced on social media that they were preparing their second single off of their second yet-to-be-titled album. The song was eventually revealed to be titled "Ride or Die", featuring vocals from indie pop band Foster the People, and was released on 9 March 2018.

On 7 March 2018, they announced their second album, under the title New York Narcotic, which was scheduled for a spring release date. A little while after, it was confirmed on ASCAP that they had recorded new songs with the likes of Sofi Tukker and Method Man which are expected to make the album.

On 29 June 2018, they announced a third single from the album, entitled "Shades", which was co-written alongside Lukas Graham affiliate Morten Pilegaard. Shortly after, that weekend, they announced that the album was finished.

On 17 August 2018, they announced their second studio album under the predicted title New York Narcotic, along with the pre-order. The track list revealed that "House Party" with Captain Cuts was not included on the album and was classified as a non-album single. It was also revealed the album was to feature further contributions from the likes of Big Boi, Sofi Tukker, Sir Sly and Alexis Krauss.

In January 2019, the Knocks embarked on a North American tour featuring a full live band. During this time, they had begun to work with bassist and record producer Blu DeTiger, who was also supporting the Knocks during their tour, with whom the duo contributed to her first two singles "In My Head" and "Mad Love".

=== 2019–present: Summer Series: 2019 EP, solo projects, HISTORY ===
In April 2019, it was announced that the duo had worked with Carly Rae Jepsen on her fourth album Dedicated on a song called "Julien", which was released as the album's third single on 19 April 2019. Later in 2019, the Knocks released an EP called Summer Series: 2019, which featured tracks like popular Tiktok song "Lucky Me" and "New York Luau", which was the feature song at the US Open broadcast on ESPN.

In October 2020, the duo announced their first single of their new album "All About You", featuring Foster the People. The song would be featured in TikTok's end of the year "Wrapped" ad and reached #14 on US Alt radio charts.

In June 2021, the duo released the single "Bedroom Eyes" in collaboration with Studio Killers which featured a music video starring Casey Frey. They later featured in a remix of the song by Nathan Barnatt under the persona of Dad Feels.

The Knocks released their third album, HISTORY, on April 29, 2022. The album features MUNA, Mallrat, Totally Enormous Extinct Dinosaurs, Foster the People, Cold War Kids, Parson James, Dragonette, Cannons, Donna Missal, Yoke Lore, and Powers. The music video for "Slow Song" with Dragonette was shot in Mexico City and features Ru Paul's Drag Race winner Aquaria.

The Knocks have had five songs featured in the iconic EA Sports FIFA video game series: "We Got U" with Lemaitre (2017), "Awa Ni" featuring Kah-lo (2020), "Best Friend" with Sofi Tukker, Nervo and Alisa Ueno (2018), "Walking on Water" featuring Totally Enormous Extinct Dinosaurs (2023), and "People" with Kungs (2023). They are the only artists on this year's FIFA 23 Edition with two songs on the soundtrack ("Walking on Water" and "People").

The Knocks released their fourth album, Revelation, in June of 2025. The album was a collaboration with indie-pop act Dragonette.

=== HeavyRoc Music and Black Clay ===
Ben Ruttner founded HeavyRoc Music in 2007 and has since released debut singles for acts including Sofi Tukker, Blu DeTiger, St. Lucia, and more. In 2017, the label was nominated for a GRAMMY for Best Dance Recording for the song "Drinkee". In 2019, the label expanded to include a partnership with Warner Music Group and now operates under the name Black Clay. Black Clay has released projects for artists including Holiday87 (Ruttner's solo project), James Patterson, and Richie Quake.

== Touring ==
The band have actively encouraged fans to set up after-parties following their shows where they DJ. Typically these are at colleges, dorms, late night spots or anywhere available.

The Knocks' first US tour was opening for Ellie Goulding. Supporting Dragonette's American/Canadian tour in 2012, they also played alongside Diplo, Justice, Boys Noize, and Knife Party on the Holy Ship!. During 2013, The Knocks began touring with Alex Clare and commenced a college tour with Grouplove.

The Knocks have shared the stage with artists such as The 1975, Justin Bieber [Purpose Tour], DJ Shadow, St. Lucia, Bruno Mars, Chromeo, Deadmau5, Skrillex, Big Boi, M.I.A., Sleigh Bells, Tiesto, Martin Solveig, Weezer, Die Antwoord, Edward Sharpe and the Magnetic Zeros, Two Door Cinema Club, and Calvin Harris.

The band has performed at festivals around the world, including Wonderfront, Firefly, M3F, Pal Norte, Ultra Miami, All Things Go, Kaaboo, Camp Bisco, Bonanza, Splash House, Shaky Beats, Phoenix Lights, Euphoria, Okeechobee, Outside Lands, Cultivate, Gov Ball, Bonnaroo, Spring Awakening, Sasquatch!, SXSW, CMJ, Hellow Fest, lleSoniq, Wakarusa, Lights All Night, Tomorrowworld, North Coast Music Festival, Kahbang Music & Arts Festival, Veld Music Festival, Osheaga Festival, RBC Blues Festival, Electro Beach, HolyShip!, Foreshore Festival, Monster Bash, Budweiser Made in America, Electric Forest, HARD Haunted Mansion, The Big Chill Festival, Underage Festival.

The Knocks did a North American co-headline tour with Cannons in 2019.

== Controversy ==
Ahead of Daft Punk's 2013 album release Random Access Memories, the band were accused of unmasking Daft Punk with photos of the band playing beer-pong with champagne glasses in Columbia Records' offices. The band responded that they did not take the photos, which were in fact a re-post from another user, and furthermore many pictures of Daft Punk without masks freely and openly exist.

== Discography ==
- 55 (2016)
- New York Narcotic (2018)
- History (2022)
- Revelation (with Dragonette) (2025)
