= Annie (singer) discography =

Annie discography
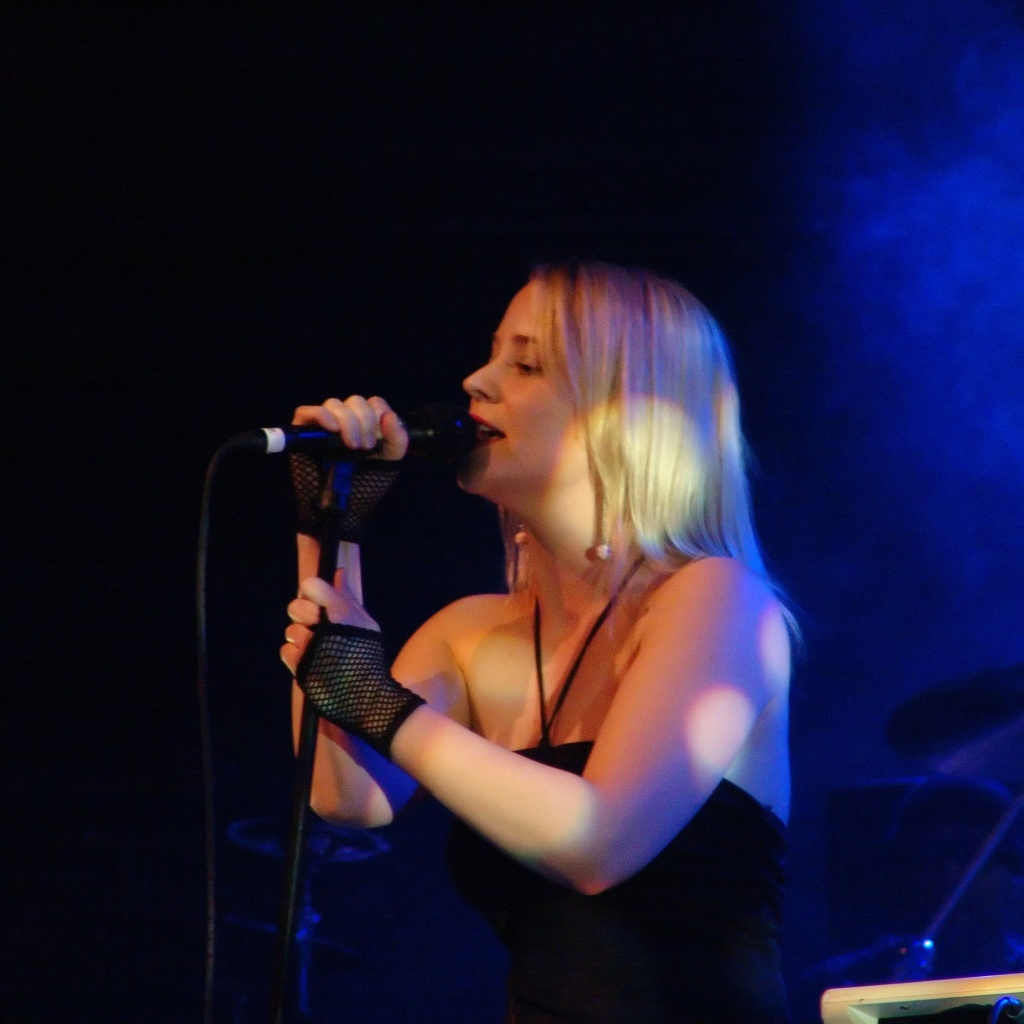
- Annie performing in 2005
- Studio albums: 3
- Extended plays: 4
- Singles: 25
- Music videos: 8
- Mix albums: 5
- Promotional singles: 2

Norwegian singer and DJ Annie has released three studio albums, five mix albums, four extended plays, 25 singles (including five as a featured artist), and two additional promotional singles and eight music videos.

== Albums ==
=== Studio albums ===
List of studio albums, with selected chart positions
Title	Details	Peak chart positions			
Title	Details	NOR	UK	US Dance	US Heat.
Anniemal	Released: 28 September 2004; Label: 679; Formats: CD, LP, digital download	6	101	13	—
Don't Stop	Released: 19 October 2009; Label: Totally, Smalltown Supersound; Formats: CD, LP, digital download	25	126	12	23
Dark Hearts	Released: 16 October 2020; Label: Annie Melody; Formats: CD, LP, cassette, digital download, streaming	24	—	—	—
"—" denotes a recording that did not chart or was not released in that territory.

=== Mix albums ===
Title	Details
DJ-Kicks: Annie	Released: 17 October 2005; Label: Studio !K7; Formats: CD, LP, digital download
Wednesday Mix (with DJ Fett Burger)	Released: 2009; Label: Sony Norge; Format: CD
Friday Mix (with DJ Fett Burger)	Released: 2010; Label: Sony Norge; Format: CD
Thursday Mix (with DJ Fett Burger)	Released: 2011; Label: Sony Norge; Format: CD
Tuesday Mix (with DJ Fett Burger)	Released: 2011; Label: Sony Norge; Format: CD

== Extended plays ==
Title	Details
iTunes Festival: London 2008	Released: 27 July 2008; Label: Island; Format: Digital download
The A&R EP	Released: 5 August 2013; Label: Pleasure Masters; Formats: CD, 12-inch vinyl, digital download
Endless Vacation	Released: 16 October 2015; Label: Pleasure Masters; Formats: CD, digital download
Neon Nights	Released: 10 September 2021; Label: Annie Melody; Formats: CD, digital download, streaming

== Singles ==
=== As lead artist ===
List of singles as lead artist, with selected chart positions, showing year released and album name
Title	Year	Peak chart positions									Album
Title	Year	NOR	AUS	BEL (FL) Tip	FIN	JPN	NL	SWE	UK	US Dance Sales	Album
"The Greatest Hit"	1999	—	—	—	—	—	—	—	100	—	Anniemal
"I Will Get On"	2002	—	—	—	—	—	—	—	196	—	Non-album single
"Chewing Gum"	2004	8	46	—	—	—	—	31	25	—	Anniemal
"Heartbeat"	2005	18	—	7	17	—	77	—	50	11	Anniemal
"Happy Without You"	2005	—	—	—	—	—	—	—	—	—	Anniemal
"Always Too Late"	2005	—	—	—	—	—	—	—	—	—	Anniemal
"The Wedding"	2005	—	—	—	—	—	—	—	—	—	DJ-Kicks: Annie
"Crush"	2006	—	—	—	—	—	—	—	—	13	Non-album single
"I Know UR Girlfriend Hates Me"	2008	—	—	—	—	—	—	—	54	—	Don't Stop
"Anthonio"	2009	—	—	—	—	—	—	—	—	—	Don't Stop
"Songs Remind Me of You"	2009	—	—	—	—	60	—	—	—	—	Don't Stop
"My Love Is Better"	2009	—	—	—	—	—	—	—	—	—	Don't Stop
"Tube Stops and Lonely Hearts"	2013	—	—	—	—	—	—	—	—	—	Non-album singles
"Russian Kiss" (featuring Bjarne Melgaard)	2014	—	—	—	—	—	—	—	—	—	Non-album singles
"Labyrinth" (Tuff City Kids with Annie)	2016	—	—	—	—	—	—	—	—	—	Adoldesscent
"American Cars"	2020	—	—	—	—	—	—	—	—	—	Dark Hearts
"The Bomb"	2020	—	—	—	—	—	—	—	—	—	Dark Hearts
"Dark Hearts"	2020	—	—	—	—	—	—	—	—	—	Dark Hearts
"The Streets Where I Belong"	2020	—	—	—	—	—	—	—	—	—	Dark Hearts
"Neon Lights" (featuring Jake Shears)	2021	—	—	—	—	—	—	—	—	—	Neon Nights
"Just Like Honey"	2021	—	—	—	—	—	—	—	—	—	Neon Nights
"The Sky Is Blue"	2024	—	—	—	—	—	—	—	—	—	Non-album singles
"Next 2 U" (with Eagles & Butterflies)	2025	—	—	—	—	—	—	—	—	—	Non-album singles
"—" denotes a recording that did not chart or was not released in that territory.

=== As featured artist ===
Title	Year	Album
"I Will Always Remember You" (Fredrik Saroea featuring Annie)	2002	Non-album singles
"Follow Me" (Ercola featuring Annie)	2011	Non-album singles
"Alien Summer" (The Toxic Avenger featuring Annie)	2011	Angst
"Crazy for You" (Designer Drugs featuring Annie)	2012	Hardcore/Softcore
"Take a Look at the World" (Ralph Myerz featuring Annie)	2013	Supersonic Pulse

=== Promotional singles ===
Title	Year	Album
"Me Plus One"	2004	Anniemal
"Two of Hearts"	2008	Non-album single

== Guest appearances ==
List of non-single guest appearances, with other performing artists, showing year released and album name
Title	Year	Other artist(s)	Album
"Just Friends"	2003	Richard X	Richard X Presents His X-Factor Vol. 1
"Wicked Ways"	2017	The Sound of Arrows	Stay Free

== Music videos ==
List of music videos, showing year released and directors
Title	Year	Director(s)
"Chewing Gum"	2004	Barnaby Roper
"Heartbeat"	2005	Mark Adcock
"I Know UR Girlfriend Hates Me"	2008	Sarah Chatfield
"Songs Remind Me of You"	2009	Miikka Lommi
"Tube Stops and Lonely Hearts"	2013	White Tiger Amateurs
"Take a Look at the World" (Ralph Myerz featuring Annie)	2013	Øystein Fyxe
"Back Together"	2013	Stian Servoss and Hildegunn Waerness
"Russian Kiss" (featuring Bjarne Melgaard)	2014	Richard Kern
