= Richard X discography =

The following is a discography of Richard X, a British pop music producer. It includes his releases, productions, and remixes.

== Girls on Top ==
Richard X started his career in the underground music scene creating popular bootlegs under the pseudonym Girls on Top.

Singles

- "Being Scrubbed" / "I Wanna Dance with Numbers" (January 2001)
  - The Human League's "Being Boiled" vs TLC's "No Scrubs"
  - Whitney Houston's "I Wanna Dance With Somebody (Who Loves Me)" vs Kraftwerk's "Numbers" and "Computer World Part 2"
- "Warm Bitch" / "We Don't Give a Damn About Our Friends" (August 2001)
  - Missy Elliott's "She's a Bitch" vs The Normal's "Warm Leatherette"
  - Adina Howard's "Freak Like Me" vs Gary Numan/Tubeway Army's "Are 'Friends' Electric?"

Albums

- Greatest Hits (April 2005)
  - includes Girls on Top's singles, "Romance V.3" (Aaliyah's "Rock the Boat" vs Orchestral Manoeuvres in the Dark's "The Romance of the Telescope"), "The White Single" (Fat Truckers' "Teenage Daughters" vs The Beatles' "Paperback Writer", and the We Don't Give a Damn Mix of Sugababes' "Freak Like Me"

== Richard X ==
Singles

- "Freak Like Me" (vs Sugababes) (#1, April 2002)
- "Being Nobody" (vs Liberty X) (#3, March 2003)
- "Finest Dreams" (featuring Kelis) (#8, August 2003)
- "You Used To" (featuring Javine) (cancelled)

Albums

- Richard X Presents His X-Factor Vol. 1 (#31, August 2003)
- Back to Mine Volume 17 (April 2004)

== Production discography ==
=== 2001 ===
==== Girls on Top ====
- "Being Scrubbed"
- "I Wanna Dance with Numbers"
- "Warm Bitch"
- "We Don't Give a Damn About Our Friends"
- "Romance V.3"
- "The White Single"

=== 2002 ===
==== Sugababes - Angels with Dirty Faces ====
- "Freak Like Me"

=== 2003 ===
==== Bertine Zetlitz - Sweet Injections ====
- "Girl Like You"

==== M*A*R*Y ====
- "73 Club" (featuring Andrew Robinson)

==== Tiga ====
- "Burning Down"

==== Shame 69 ====
- "No Business"

==== Richard X Presents His X-Factor Vol. 1 ====
1. "Start"
2. "Being Nobody" (vs Liberty X)
3. "Rock Jacket"
4. "You Used To" (featuring Javine)
5. "Just Friends" (featuring Annie)
6. "IX"
7. "Lonely" (featuring Caron Wheeler)
8. "Walk On By" (featuring Deborah Evans-Strickland)
9. "Lemon/Lime" (featuring Deborah Evans-Strickland)
10. "Finest Dreams" (featuring Kelis)
11. "You (Better Let Me Love You X4) Tonight" (featuring Tiga)
12. "Mark One" (featuring Mark Goodier)
13. "Freak Like Me (We Don't Give a Damn Mix)" (vs Sugababes)
14. "Into U" (featuring Jarvis Cocker)
15. "End"

==== Liberty X - Being Somebody ====
- "Being Nobody"

=== 2004 ===
==== Prince Po - The Slickness ====
- "Hold Dat"

==== Rachel Stevens - Funky Dory reissue ====
- "Some Girls"

==== Annie - Anniemal ====
- "Chewing Gum"
- "Me Plus One"

=== 2005 ===
==== M.I.A. - Arular ====
- "Amazon"
- "10 Dollar"

==== Rachel Stevens - Come and Get It ====
- "Some Girls"
- "Crazy Boys"

=== 2006 ===
==== Pet Shop Boys - Fundamentalism ====
- "Fugitive"

==== Luke Haines ====
- "Off My Rocker at the Art School Bop"
- "I Am the Best Artist / Skinny White Boys"

==== Alesha Dixon - Fired Up ====
- "Nasty" (unreleased)
- "Shadows" (unreleased)
- "Ting-a-ling"

=== 2007 ===
==== Chungking - Stay Up Forever ====
- "Itch and Scratch"
- "Slow It Down"

==== Róisín Murphy - Overpowered ====
- "Parallel Lives"

Outtakes

- "Pandora" (b-side to "You Know Me Better", and iTunes Bonus Track to Overpowered)

==== Sam Sparro - Sam Sparro ====
- "Too Many Questions"
- "Sally"
- "No End in Sight"

=== 2009 ===
==== Annie - Don't Stop ====
- "Songs Remind Me of You"

All Night EP

- "I Know UR Girlfriend Hates Me"
- "Anthonio"

Outtakes

- "Two of Hearts"

=== 2010 ===
==== Sophie Ellis-Bextor - Make a Scene ====
- "Starlight"
- "Magic"

==== Steve Mason - Boys Outside ====
- "All Come Down"

==== Goldfrapp - Head First ====
- "Alive"

=== 2011 ===
==== Innerpartysystem - Never Be Content ====
- "And Together"
- "Money Makes The World Go Round"
- "American Trash"
- "Out of Touch"
- "Not Getting Any Better"
- "Squid"

==== Will Young - Echoes ====
- "Jealousy"
- "Come On"
- "Lie Next To Me"
- "I Just Want A Lover"
- "Runaway"
- "Outsider"
- "Silent Valentine"
- "Losing Myself"
- "Personal Thunder"
- "Hearts On Fire"
- "Happy Now"
- "Good Things"
- "Safe From Harm"

==== The Sound of Arrows - Voyage ====
- "Into the Clouds"
- "My Shadow"
- "Magic"
- "Longest Ever Dream"
- "Lost City"

=== 2016 ===
==== Little Boots - After Hours EP ====
- "Staring at the Sun"

=== 2019 ===
==== Bananarama - In Stereo ====
- "Love in Stereo"

==== Band of Skulls - Love Is All You Love ====
- "Carnivorous"
- "That's My Trouble"
- "Love Is All You Love"
- "Not The Kind Of Nothing I Know"
- "Cool Your Battles"
- "Sound Of You"
- "Thanks A Lot"
- "We're Alive"
- "Speed Of Light"
- "Gold"

==== Will Young - Lexicon ====
- "All the Songs"
- "My Love"
- "Scars"
- "Get Me Dancing" (produced with Eg White and Jimmy Hogarth)
- "Ground Running"
- "Dreaming Big" (produced with Liam Howe)
- "I Bet You Call" (produced with Eg White)
- "Forever"
- "Freedom" (written and produced with Boy Matthews)
- "Faithless Love"
- "Say Anything"
- "The Way We Were" (produced with Sermstyle)

=== 2021 ===
==== Will Young - Crying on the Bathroom Floor ====
- "Daniel"
- "Crying on the Bathroom Floor"
- "Till There's Nothing Left"
- "Indestructible"
- "Strong"
- "I Follow Rivers"
- "Everything Is Embarrassing"
- "Losing You"
- "Missing"
- "Elizabeth Taylor"

=== 2023 ===
==== Alison Goldfrapp - The Love Invention ====
- "NeverStop"
- "Love Invention"
- "Digging Deeper Now"
- "In Electric Blue"
- "The Beat Divine"
- "Fever (This Is the Real Thing)"
- "Hotel (Suite 23)"
- "Subterfuge" (as audio engineer only)
- "Gatto Gelato"
- "So Hard So Hot" (as audio engineer only)
- "SloFlo" (as audio engineer only)
- "Impossible" (as audio engineer only)

=== 2024 ===
==== Bright Light Bright Light - Enjoy Youth ====
- "Keep"

=== 2025 ===
==== Alison Goldfrapp - Flux ====
- "Find Xanadu"

== Remixography ==
=== 2002 ===
- Fat Truckers - "The White Single" (Richard X Remix) (Fat Truckers' "Teenage Daughter" vs The Beatles' "Paperback Writer")
- Sugababes - "Freak Like Me" (Richard X/Girls On Top Remix)

=== 2003 ===
- Richard X vs Liberty X - "Being Nobody" (Richard X Remix)
- Richard X vs Liberty X - "Being Nobody" (Richard X Dancehall Remix featuring Specialist Moss)
- Louie Austen featuring Peaches - "Grab My Shaft" (Richard X Remix)
- Bertine Zetlitz - "Girl Like You" (Richard X And Lucky Music Remix)
- TLC - "Hands Up" (Richard X Remix)
- Tiga - "Hot In Herre" (Richard X presents Gareth Gatex Remix)
- Tiga - "Hot In Herre" (Richard X presents Gareth Gatex Dub)

=== 2004 ===
- Tiga - "Pleasure from the Rave" ("Pleasure from the Bass" remix)
- Depeche Mode - "Enjoy the Silence 04" (Richard X extended mix)
- Freeform Five - "No More Conversations" (Richard X remix)

=== 2005 ===
- Ciara - "Goodies" (Richard X Remix featuring M.I.A.)
- New Order - "Jetstream" (Richard X Remix)
- Nine Inch Nails - "Only" (Richard X Remix)
- Gwen Stefani - "Cool" (Richard X Remix)
- The Bravery - "Fearless" (Richard X Remix)

=== 2006 ===
- Yazoo - "Situation" (Richard X Remix)
- New Order - "Bizarre Love Triangle" (Richard X Remix)
- Annie - "The Crush" (Richard X Remix)
- Depeche Mode - "Personal Jesus" (Richard X Remix) (unreleased)
- Nine Inch Nails - "Only" (Richard X Remix) from Every Day Is Exactly The Same [EP]

=== 2007 ===
- Nerina Pallot - "Geek Love" (Richard X Remix)

=== 2008 ===
- Soft Cell - "Seedy Films" (Richard X Remix)

=== 2009 ===
- Pet Shop Boys - "The way it used to be" (Richard X Remix)
- Dragonette - "Pick Up the Phone" (Richard X Remix)
- Saint Etienne - Foxbase Beta (whole album remixed by Richard X)

=== 2010 ===
- Goldfrapp - "Rocket" (Richard X Eight Four Remix)
- Goldfrapp - "Rocket" (Richard X One Zero Remix and Radio Edit)
- Goldfrapp - "Rocket" (Richard X One Zero Remix)
- Hot Chip - "I Feel Better" (Richard X Remix)
- Kelis - "4th of July (Fireworks)" (Richard X Remix)

=== 2011 ===
- Patrick Wolf - "The City" (Richard X Remix)
- Mirrors - "Into the Heart" (Richard X Radio Remix)

=== 2012 ===
- Cassie - "King of Hearts" (Richard X Remix)

=== 2013 ===
- Belle and Sebastian - I Didn't See it Coming (Richard X Mix)

=== 2021 ===
- Annie - American Cars (Richard X Edit)
