= The Greatest Hit =

Single by Annie

from the album Anniemal
- Released: 1999
- Length: 3:39
- Label: Tellé
- Songwriters: Anne Lilia Berge Strand; Tore Andreas Kroknes; Madonna
- Producers: Kroknes; Annie

Annie singles chronology
"The Greatest Hit" (1999)	"I Will Get On" (2002)

"The Greatest Hit" is a song by Norwegian singer Annie. It was written and produced by Annie and DJ Tore "Erot" Kroknes. The song samples Madonna's 1982 debut single "Everybody", and she received a co-writing credit. The track was released as a limited edition 7-inch single in 1999. It became an underground club hit in Norway and the United Kingdom. Retitled "Greatest Hit", the song was later included on Annie's debut album, Anniemal (2004).

== Background and release ==
In the late 1990s, Annie ran a club night called Pop Till You Drop in her hometown of Bergen, Norway. There she met producer Tore "Erot" Kroknes, and the two began dating. "The Greatest Hit" was conceived while they were staying in a house belonging to Annie's mother. Kroknes was working on a track, but did not know what to do with it, so he asked Annie for help.

Annie was listening to the song "Everybody" at the time, so she decided to play Madonna's self-titled debut album for Kroknes. He started to construct a song from a sample of "Everybody", and Annie came up with a melody to sing over the track. The two borrowed a small studio from downtempo duo Röyksopp to record the song.

In 1999, Mikal Tellé, Annie's friend and neighbour, issued a limited edition 7-inch single of "The Greatest Hit" under his label Tellé Records. The release sold out in two days, and the track became an underground hit in nightclubs in Norway and Britain, resulting in offers for record deals. After seeing the interest that "The Greatest Hit" generated, Annie decided to turn her project into a studio album.

== Composition ==
British producer Richard X heard "The Greatest Hit" as part of a techno set and described the song as "otherworldly and beautiful". He cited the song's "idea of pop music coming from another place, another way of thinking" as an influence on his early work. As a result, Richard X asked Annie to record vocals for his debut album Richard X Presents His X-Factor Vol. 1 (2003). In exchange, he contributed "Me Plus One" and Annie's third single "Chewing Gum" to her debut album Anniemal. Annie originally aimed to make Anniemal a pop album that would not become quickly dated, one "that you could listen to in five years and it wouldn't sound terrible." She considered excluding "The Greatest Hit" from the album to achieve this, but ultimately included it because she felt it did not sound as if it were five years old.

== Critical reception ==
"The Greatest Hit" received little attention when released as a single, but garnered critical acclaim when Anniemal was released in 2004. Sal Cinquemani of Slant Magazine said that the song's "recycled synth-loop and elastic bassline still sound as fresh as they did in 1999 and, yes, even 1982." In a review for Pitchfork, Scott Plagenhoef described the song as an "intoxicating clubland 'duet' between producer and vocalist." AllMusic's Andy Kellman likened the song's "nonchalant ecstasy" to that of Patrice Rushen's 1982 funk single "Forget Me Nots". Dylan Hicks, in a review for The Village Voice, commented that the song "still parties as if it were" from 1999 and "betters" the song it samples.

== Track listings ==
- Norwegian 7-inch limited-edition single

A. "The Greatest Hit" (7" Edit) – 4:29
B. "The Greatest Hit" (7" Dub Rework) – 6:08

- Norwegian 12-inch limited-edition single

A1. "The Greatest Hit" (12" Extended Disco Mix) – 7:29
A2. "The Greatest Hit" (Radio Edit) – 4:19
B. "The Greatest Hit" (12" Instrumental) – 9:39

- UK CD single
1. "The Greatest Hit" (Edit) – 4:22
2. "The Greatest Hit" (Extended Disco Mix) – 7:32
3. "The Greatest Hit" (Freeform Reform Vocal) – 9:40
- UK 12" single

A1. "The Greatest Hit" (Extended Disco Mix) – 7:32
AA1. "The Greatest Hit" (Freeform Reform Vocal) – 9:40

- Digital EP
1. "The Greatest Hit" (Extended Disco Mix) – 7:28
2. "The Greatest Hit" (Freeform Reform Vocal) – 9:42
3. "Greatest Hit" (Edit) – 4:21
4. "Greatest Hit" (Soul Mekanik Remix) – 10:43
- UK 12" single – The Greatest Dubs

A1. "The Greatest Dub" (Soul Mekanik Dub) – 10:41
A2. "The Greatest Dub" (Soul Mekanik Acappela) – 2:20
AA1. "The Greatest Dub" – 9:38

- Digital EP – 2010 Remixes
1. "Greatest Hit" (Stefano Noferini & Marini Mix) – 6:23
2. "Greatest Hit" (Mark E Late Night Space Workout) – 7:07
3. "Greatest Hit" (Mazoku Boyfriend Remix) – 3:33
4. "Greatest Hit" (Stefano Noferini & Marini Radio Edit) – 3:32

== Personnel ==
Credits adapted from 7-inch single liner notes.

- Annie – lead vocals, production
- Torbjørn Brundtland – mixing
- Erot – mixing, production, sleeve design
- Thoroball – photography

== Charts ==
Chart (2002)	Peak position
UK Singles (OCC)	100
UK Indie (OCC)	24
