= Me Plus One =

Me Plus One may refer to:

- "Me Plus One" (Kasabian song)
- "Me Plus One" (Annie song)
