= Annie discography =

Annie discography may refer to:

- Annie (singer) discography
- Annie (musical) discography; see Annie (musical)#Recordings

== See also ==
- Annie (1982 film soundtrack)
- Annie (1999 film soundtrack)
- "Annie" (song)
- Annie (disambiguation)
