= Me Plus One (Annie song) =

2004 song performed by Annie

Promotional single by Annie

from the album Anniemal
- Released: 2004
- Genre: Diva house; electropop
- Length: 3:39
- Label: Warner
- Songwriter(s): Richard X; Hannah Robinson
- Producer(s): Richard X

"Me Plus One" is a song by Norwegian singer and songwriter Annie from her debut studio album, Anniemal (2004). It was written by Richard X and Hannah Robinson, and released as a promotional single. The song was written about former Spice Girls member Geri Halliwell. The lyrics refer to a "wannabe señorita" who needs to realise she has "got to let it go". The song received acclaim from music critics.

The song appears on Popjustice: 100% Solid Pop Music.

== Background and writing ==
"Me Plus One" was written by Richard X and Hannah Robinson in response to former Spice Girls member Geri Halliwell. Richard X and Robinson had written another song called "Some Girls", later a hit single for Rachel Stevens. Warp Records and Simon Fuller contacted Richard X by email to ask that he give the song to Halliwell or Stevens, respectively, to record. He agreed to have Stevens record the song after Richard Curtis asked about using the song for Sport Relief 2004. When Halliwell found out that the writers were having Stevens record the song, she locked herself in her car in an attempt to change their minds, and she later wrote Richard X a love song. The aftermath of the decision for Stevens to record the song became the subject of "Me Plus One" from Annie's 2004 album Anniemal.

The lyrics of "Me Plus One" detail a girl who dreams of fame but cannot achieve it. She fails to be accepted into the Italia Conti Academy of Theatre Arts. The verse two says the "wannabe señorita met a group of likely girls [...] but it didn't make her happy", referencing the half-Spanish Halliwell's rise to stardom with the Spice Girls and her subsequent unhappiness with the group. The song's middle-eight references the "Some Girls" situation—"take a look at yourself, get out of the car, it's time to let go—it's gone."

== Critical reception ==
"Me Plus One" received acclaim from music critics. Scott Plagenhoef's review for Pitchfork Media named it "winking" and "seductive". The Stranger compared the track to The Human League, while Tiny Mix Tapes referred to the song as a "gorgeous day-glo dance party." Stylus Magazine described the song as "a tale of sulky pop princesses trying to be like the Chewing Gum queen and getting smashed on the rocks".

== Track listings ==
- Norwegian promotional CD single
1. "Me Plus One" – 3:38
- US promotional 12-inch single

A1. "Me Plus One" (The Rapture/Hush Hush Remix) – 5:40
A2. "Me Plus One" (James Iha Remix) – 3:27
B1. "Heartbeat" (MSTRKRFT Edition) – 6:31
B2. "Happy Without You" (Riton Vocal Mix) – 5:48

== Personnel ==
Credits adapted from the liner notes of Anniemal.

- Annie – lead vocals
- Hannah Robinson – backing vocals, songwriting
- Richard X – production, songwriting
- Pete Hofmann – guitar
