= I Know UR Girlfriend Hates Me =

Single by Annie

from the album Don't Stop (special edition)
- B-side: "Danny, Danny"
- Released: 14 July 2008
- Recorded: 2007
- Genre: Electropop
- Length: 3:09
- Label: Island
- Songwriter(s): Annie, Richard X, Hannah Robinson
- Producer(s): Richard X

Annie singles chronology
| "The Crush" (2006) | "I Know UR Girlfriend Hates Me" (2008) | "Anthonio" (2009) |

Alternative cover
- 7" single cover

"I Know UR Girlfriend Hates Me" is an electropop song performed by Norwegian recording artist Annie. It was released on 14 July 2008 as the lead single from her second studio album, Don't Stop (2009). However, the song is not featured on the standard track listing of the album but is available on the special edition bonus disc.

== Background ==
Annie wrote "I Know UR Girlfriend Hates Me" with producer Richard X and songwriter Hannah Robinson, the two of whom had written "Chewing Gum" and "Me Plus One" from Annie's debut album Anniemal (2004). They wrote the music first, inspired by Prince's 1986 funk song "Kiss".

Annie described how the lyrics were based on a friend of hers, "who was really a beautiful girl, always surrounded by loads of guys." Her friend spent time with a guy and was confronted by his girlfriend for it. Annie called the problems between the two "ridiculous, but also funny." After her friend kept telling her about the situation, Annie decided to write a song about it. The lyrics describe a girlfriend who is going berserk and "needs to calm down." Annie's persona, however, hints that the girlfriend probably should be worried.

The song was used in 2 episodes of Waterloo Road, screened on 18 February 2009 and 25 February 2009.

== Critical reception ==
"I Know UR Girlfriend Hates Me" received positive reviews from pop music critics. Pitchfork Media's Marc Hogan described the song as a "slinky electro-pop" and compared it to English dance group Saint Etienne. Cam Lindsay of Exclaim.ca called the song a "brilliant slice of pop" with "delicious" lyrics. In a review for Digital Spy, Nick Levine described the song as "sweet, scrumptious electropop" and compared it to her song "Chewing Gum", a "nearly-hit from a few years back".

Pitchfork Media placed "I Know UR Girlfriend Hates Me" at number 58 on their 100 Best Tracks of 2008 list, while Planet Sound named it the eighth best single of 2008.

== Music video ==
The music video for "I Know UR Girlfriend Hates Me" was directed by Sarah Chatfield. The video features Annie performing in a studio in front of various colourful backgrounds. It begins with Annie in a black dress singing into a microphone with several female dancers dancing behind her. She is then shown dressed in pink, purple, blue and yellow singing in front of multi-coloured backgrounds. The video version of the song uses the original version of the song, featuring a different introduction to the single version.

== Track listings ==
- 12" promo single

(ANNIE12PRO1; Released 7 July 2008)

1. "I Know UR Girlfriend Hates Me" (Original Edit)
2. "I Know UR Girlfriend Hates Me" (Feel The Moog Remix)
3. "I Know UR Girlfriend Hates Me" (Get Shakes Remix)
4. "I Know UR Girlfriend Hates Me" (FDZ Remix)
- Promo CDr – Remixes

(ANNIECDPRO2; Released 7 July 2008)

1. "I Know UR Girlfriend Hates Me" (Original Edit) – 3:11
2. "I Know UR Girlfriend Hates Me" (Get Shakes Remix) – 5:46
3. "I Know UR Girlfriend Hates Me" (Section Remix) – 5:31
4. "I Know UR Girlfriend Hates Me" (FDZ Remix) – 4:11
5. "I Know UR Girlfriend Hates Me" (Timo Remix) – 6:31
- Promo CDr

(ANNIECDPRO3; Released July 14, 2008)

1. "I Know UR Girlfriend Hates Me" (Original Edit)
2. "I Know UR Girlfriend Hates Me" (Get Shakes)
3. "I Know UR Girlfriend Hates Me" (Section)
4. "I Know UR Girlfriend Hates Me" (FDZ)
5. "I Know UR Girlfriend Hates Me" (Timo)
6. "I Know UR Girlfriend Hates Me" (Soulseekerz Dirty Vocal)
7. "I Know UR Girlfriend Hates Me" (Soulseekerz Club)
8. "I Know UR Girlfriend Hates Me" (Soulseekerz Radio)
- Digital download

(Released 27 June 2008)

1. "I Know UR Girlfriend Hates Me" – 3:09
- B-side bundle

(Released 13 July 2008)

1. "I Know UR Girlfriend Hates Me" – 3:09
2. "Danny, Danny" – 3:03
- Digital download – Remixes

(Released 13 July 2008)

1. "I Know UR Girlfriend Hates Me" (Feel the Moog remix) – 4:44
2. "I Know UR Girlfriend Hates Me" (Get Shakes remix) – 5:47
3. "I Know UR Girlfriend Hates Me" (Deadly Weapons remix) – 5:30
4. "I Know UR Girlfriend Hates Me" (Feadz remix) – 4:10
5. "I Know UR Girlfriend Hates Me" (Timo remix) – 6:31
6. "I Know UR Girlfriend Hates Me" (Soul Seekerz club mix) – 8:39
7. "I Know UR Girlfriend Hates Me" (Soul Seekerz radio edit) – 3:16
- E-single

(Released 13 July 2008)

1. "I Know UR Girlfriend Hates Me" – 3:09
2. "I Know UR Girlfriend Hates Me" (Feel the Moog remix) – 4:44
3. "I Know UR Girlfriend Hates Me" (Get Shakes remix) – 5:47
4. "I Know UR Girlfriend Hates Me" (Deadly Weapons remix) – 5:30
5. "I Know UR Girlfriend Hates Me" (Feadz remix) – 4:10
6. "I Know UR Girlfriend Hates Me" (Timo remix) – 6:31
7. "I Know UR Girlfriend Hates Me" (Soul Seekerz club mix) – 8:39
8. "I Know UR Girlfriend Hates Me" (Soul Seekerz radio edit) – 3:16
- 7" single

(1779587; Released 14 July 2008; limited edition)

1. "I Know UR Girlfriend Hates Me" – 3:09
2. "Danny, Danny" – 3:03
- CD single

(1779586; Released 14 July 2008)

1. "I Know UR Girlfriend Hates Me" – 3:09
2. "I Know UR Girlfriend Hates Me" (Feel the Moog remix) – 4:44
3. "I Know UR Girlfriend Hates Me" (Get Shakes remix) – 5:47
4. "I Know UR Girlfriend Hates Me" (Deadly Weapons remix) – 5:30
5. "I Know UR Girlfriend Hates Me" (Feadz remix) – 4:10
6. "I Know UR Girlfriend Hates Me" (Timo remix) – 6:31
7. "I Know UR Girlfriend Hates Me" (Soul Seekerz club mix) – 8:39
8. "I Know UR Girlfriend Hates Me" music video

== Charts ==
| Chart (2008) | Peak position |
|---|---|
| UK Singles (OCC) | 54 |
| UK Singles Downloads (OCC) | 21 |
