= Dark Hearts =

Studio album by Annie
- Released: 16 October 2020
- Length: 54:01
- Label: Annie Melody
- Producer: Stefan Storm

Annie chronology
Don't Stop (2009)	Dark Hearts (2020)	Neon Lights (2021)

Singles from Dark Hearts
- 1. "American Cars" Released: 19 June 2020; 2. "The Bomb" Released: 17 July 2020; 3. "Dark Hearts" Released: 14 August 2020; 4. "The Streets Where I Belong" Released: 11 September 2020

Dark Hearts is the third studio album by Norwegian singer Annie. It was released on 16 October 2020.

== Release ==
The album's lead single, "American Cars", was released on 19 June 2020. The second single, "The Bomb", was released on 17 July.

== Critical reception ==
Professional ratings
Aggregate scores
Source	Rating
Metacritic	67/100
Review scores
Source	Rating
DIY	2/5 stars
The Line of Best Fit	7.5/10
musicOMH	3.5/5 stars
Pitchfork	7.1/10
Slant Magazine	3.5/5 stars
Tom Hull – on the Web	B+

The album received generally favourable reviews. At Metacritic, it received a score of 67 out of 100. The score was based on seven critic reviews.

Bella Martin of DIY rated the album two out of five stars and called the tracks "American Cars" and "Dark Hearts" "a whole lot of nothing". She called the album's production "paper-thin" and felt that the whole album had no "discernible hooks". Evan Lilly of The Line of Best Fit rated the album 7.5 out of 10. He called the album a "welcomed comeback" and that it has lots of variety and style. Writing for musicOMH, Ben Devlin rated the album 3.5 out of 5 stars and noted its influence from 1980s music. He called the album a mixed bag, saying that the album has great production but that it is too limited stylistically. Katherine St. Asaph from Pitchfork wrote that the album is full of "fever-dream pop". Sal Cinquemani from Slant Magazine rated it 3.5 out of 5 stars and noted the album's similarity to the soundtrack of a teen drama. He called the album nostalgic and "richly detailed".

== Track listing ==
Dark Hearts track listing
No.	Title	Length
1.	"In Heaven"	3:41
2.	"The Streets Where I Belong"	4:10
3.	"Dark Hearts"	3:58
4.	"Miracle Mile"	5:07
5.	"Corridors of Time"	4:32
6.	"Forever '92"	4:06
7.	"American Cars"	3:46
8.	"Mermaid Dreams"	4:57
9.	"Stay Tomorrow"	4:05
10.	"The Countdown to the End of the World"	3:08
11.	"The Bomb"	4:01
12.	"The Untold Story"	5:17
13.	"It's Finally Over"	3:13
Total length:		54:01

== Charts ==
Chart performance for Dark Hearts
Chart (2020)	Peak position
Norwegian Albums (VG-lista)	24
