= The A&R EP =

EP by Annie
- Released: 29 July 2013
- Recorded: 2013
- Genre: Synth-pop; house
- Length: 19:58
- Label: Pleasure Masters
- Producer: Richard X

Annie chronology
Tuesday Mix (2011)	The A&R EP (2013)	Endless Vacation (2015)

The A&R EP is the second extended play (EP) by Norwegian singer and songwriter Annie. It was produced by Richard X and released 29 July 2013 on his Pleasure Masters label. The EP is influenced by 1990s house music. It received generally positive reviews from music critics.

== Background ==
After the 2009 release of her second album Don't Stop, she spent time working in Kent, England with production team Xenomania, feeling that "it's important to write stuff for other…to get inspiration so you don't keep on doing the same thing, over and over again." She discussed the concept for The A&R EP before meeting up with X, and he began to prepare backing tracks. In March 2013, Annie went to X's studio in London, where they largely wrote and recorded the EP was over the course of a week. To write songs, Annie began by recording melodies on her phone or iPad and adding lyrics. After finding beats, she would begin to record the song using Ableton Live or Logic Pro. X cited Telstar Records' Deep Heat compilation series of house music as an influence on the tracks.

Because of the diversity in the songs that she had written, Annie decided that they would not be able to form a coherent album. She instead assembled a "more dancey…more club related" EP, and indicated that other songs would be used to form two additional EPs. The A&R EP's title refers to Annie and Richard X's names. Its colourful cover art was inspired by rave culture.

== Songs ==
Annie described the opening track "Back Together" as being about "having the best time with the people you enjoy the most and listening to good music." It was likened to dance-pop music by the Pet Shop Boys. The song's music video was directed by Stian Servoss and Hildegunn Waerness. It pays tribute to music video shows such as Total Request Live and Pop-Up Video.

On "Hold On", Annie asks a lover not to give up on a relationship. "Ralph Macchio" is a 1980s-influenced track about actor Ralph Macchio, of whom Annie was fond of watching as a child. It came from a discussion between Annie and X "your first love of a pop star or film star." Macchio responded via Twitter, comparing the song to Bananarama's 1983 single "Cruel Summer".

"Invisible" is a breakup song in which she duets with her alter ego "Mannie". The song features clap drums, acid house squiggles, and "a heavy curtain of synths." Its use of atonality drew comparisons to Glass Candy and Sophie. For closing track "Mixed Emotions", Annie and X attempted to create a verse using an online translator but moved the results to the track's ending.

== Critical reception ==
Upon release, The A&R EP received generally positive reviews from music critics. Drowned in Sound rated it 7/10, noting that its "blissed out softness and heightened subtlety of these tracks means that the EP lacks a summer-defining chorus" but commending its consistency and maturity. Pitchfork gave it 7.6/10 and stated that its aesthetic "could come off overly studied in the wrong hands, but [the EP] fortunately preserves Annie's most compelling aspect of all: her wink." The NME gave the EP 6/10, characterising it as "a passion-project" that despite clear 1990s references, is "a love letter to the age rather than trite fetishisation."

== Track listing ==
No.	Title	Writer(s)	Length
1.	"Back Together"	Victoria Hesketh; Richard X	3:40
2.	"Hold On"	Hannah Robinson; Richard X	4:29
3.	"Ralph Macchio"	Anne Lilia Berge Strand; Richard X	3:07
4.	"Invisible"	Strand; Richard X	4:10
5.	"Mixed Emotions"	Strand; Richard X	4:41
