= I Will Get On =

Single by Annie
- Released: 27 October 2002
- Genre: Downtempo
- Length: 5:51
- Label: Tellé
- Songwriters: Annie; Erot
- Producers: Annie; Erot

Annie singles chronology
"The Greatest Hit" (1999)	"I Will Get On" (2002)	"Chewing Gum" (2004)

"I Will Get On" is a song by Norwegian singer-songwriter Annie. It was written and produced by Annie and DJ Tore "Erot" Kroknes. The track was released as a limited-edition 7-inch single and digital EP in 2002.

== Track listings ==
- Norwegian 7-inch single

(TELLÉ 014; released 2002)

A. "I Will Get On" (radio edit)
B. "I Will Get On" (Doc L's Recool Struction)

- Digital EP

(Released 27 October 2002)

1. "I Will Get On" (Joshua remix) – 8:38
2. "I Will Get On" (Joshua dub) – 8:38
3. "I Will Get On" (Laid remix) – 5:58
4. "I Will Get On" (Laid dub) – 5:56
5. "I Will Get On" – 5:51
- UK promotional 12" single

(LOAD95; released 2003)

A. "I Will Get On" (Joshua remix)
AA. "I Will Get On" (Joshua dub)

== Personnel ==
Credits adapted from 7-inch single liner notes.

- Annie – lead vocals, arrangement, production, songwriting
- Erot – arrangement, production, songwriting
- Knut Schreiner – guitar
- Torbjørn Brundtland – additional programming, engineering
- Svarte Marte – photography
- S. Heggren – sleeve artwork

== Charts ==
Chart (2003)	Peak position
UK Singles Chart	196
