= The Golden Hour of the Future =

Compilation album by the Future and the Human League
- Released: 20 October 2002
- Recorded: various studios around Sheffield, UK (1977)
- Genre: Electronic music, minimal wave
- Length: 76:53
- Label: Black Melody Records
- Producer: The Future, the Human League

The Future and the Human League chronology
Secrets (2001)	The Golden Hour of the Future (2002)	The Very Best of the Human League (2003)

The Golden Hour of the Future is a compilation album of recordings made by the electronic band the Future and early recordings by the original line-up of the Human League.

Material by the Future features Martyn Ware, Ian Craig Marsh and Adi Newton, who recorded around ten songs in the home studio of a recording engineer in 1977. The band compiled a demo tape from those recordings, which they played to record companies on an ill-fated trip to London. The band did not find a recording deal and Newton left the band to form Clock DVA.

Ware and Marsh continued as the Future for a short while before deciding to recruit Ware's friend Philip Oakey as lead vocalist. Now renamed the Human League, the trio recorded in an abandoned Sheffield factory, where they put together their first two singles for the Fast Product label ("Being Boiled" and "The Dignity Of Labour") as well as a number of other recordings before signing to Virgin Records. Most of those other recordings are included on this compilation album, along with many of the Future's recordings - only those songs that were later re-recorded for Virgin were omitted from the compilation, for contractual reasons.

The album was compiled by Richard X and released on his Black Melody label in 2002, with assistance from Human League members past and present and Sean Turner, creator of the Blind Youth website. The album was preceded by the promotional limited edition EP Dance Like a Star, which included four Human League recordings not featured on the album.

The album was re-issued in September 2005 as a re-mastered edition, both as a CD and as a digital download. The track listing remained the same although digital releases featured a 'Shorter version' of the final track 'Last Man on Earth'. The CD carried a new catalogue number MELCD5.

== Personnel and credits ==
- Produced by the Future and the Human League
- Recorded in Sheffield
- Philip Oakey – Vocals & synthesizer
- Martyn Ware – Vocals & synthesizer
- Ian Craig Marsh – Synthesizer & devices
- Adi Newton – Vocals Tapes / loops treatments
- Cover design by Designers Republic

== Track listing ==
No.	Title	Writer(s)	Length
1.	"Dance Like a Star" (The Human League)	Martyn Ware/Ian Craig Marsh/Philip Oakey	4:48
2.	"Looking for the Black Haired Girls" (The Future)	Ware/Marsh/Adi Newton	3:40
3.	"4JG" (The Human League)	Ware/Marsh/Oakey	4:36
4.	"Blank Clocks" (The Future)	Ware/Marsh/Newton	3:20
5.	"Cairo" (The Future)	Ware/Marsh/Newton	3:08
6.	"Dominion Advertisement" (The Human League)	Ware/Marsh/Oakey	0:25
7.	"Dada Dada Duchamp Vortex" (The Future)		5:49
8.	"Daz" (The Future)	Ware/Marsh/Newton	3:40
9.	"Future Religion" (The Future)	Ware/Marsh/Newton	3:44
10.	"Disco Disaster" (The Human League)	Ware/Marsh/Oakey	5:06
11.	"Interface" (The Human League)	Ware/Marsh/Oakey	2:59
12.	"The Circus of Dr Lao" (Philip Oakey)	Oakey	3:58
13.	"Reach Out (I’ll Be There)" (The Human League)	Holland–Dozier–Holland	3:55
14.	"New Pink Floyd" (The Human League)	Ware/Marsh/Oakey	2:14
15.	"Once Upon a Time in the West" (The Human League)	Ennio Morricone	1:53
16.	"Overkill Disaster Crash (V.1)" (The Human League)	Ware/Marsh/Oakey	2:02
17.	"Year of the Jet Packs" (The Human League)	Ware/Marsh/Oakey	5:26
18.	"Pulse Lovers" (The Future)	Ware/Marsh/Newton	4:02
19.	"King of Kings" (The Human League)	Miklós Rózsa	1:56
20.	"The Last Man on Earth" (The Human League)	Ware/Marsh/Oakey	10:01
