= Hannah Robinson =

British songwriter

Hannah Robinson (born in Derbyshire) is a British songwriter. Her best-known compositions include Rachel Stevens's UK No. 2 hit "Some Girls", Ladyhawke's "My Delirium" and Annie's "Chewing Gum". Robinson began her career as a vocalist and in 2006 she achieved a No. 1 on the US Hot Dance Club Play chart with "Give Me Your Love", a collaboration with Carl Cox.

== Career ==
Robinson began her career, having no formal music or vocal training, by responding to adverts for session singers in the British music papers the New Musical Express and Melody Maker. After an initial struggle she began securing backing vocal work firstly in Italy and then in London where she began working with different producers and increasingly established artists. This career path eventually led to Robinson meeting her manager and then securing a publishing deal.

== Discography ==
List of songs written or co-written by Hannah Robinson:

| Year | Artist | Tracks | Album |
|---|---|---|---|
| 2025 | Louise | "Only Dancer" | Confessions |
| 2025 | Les Votives | "Feel Alright" | Window |
| 2025 | Gustaph | "Faith In What You Feel" | Look At Us Now |
| 2025 | Gustaph | "The Feeling" | Look At Us Now |
| 2024 | Gia Ford | "Don't Drown Me Out" | Transparent Things |
| 2023 | ILIRA | "New Friend" | Never Really The End |
| 2023 | Eden Prince | "Flashing Lights" | |
| 2023 | Alison Goldfrapp | "Hotel (Suite 23)" | The Love Invention |
| 2022 | Sophie Ellis-Bextor | "Bittersweet - Live" | Kitchen Disco (Live At The London Palladium) |
| 2022 | NMIXX | "Cool (Your Rainbow)" | Entwurf |
| 2022 | Hyolyn | "Over You" | Ice |
| 2022 | Steps | "To The One" | Platinum Collection - Limited edition (H Steps) |
| 2022 | Call Me Loop | "Pain Killer" | |
| 2022 | Call Me Loop | "Pattern Of Behaviour" | |
| 2022 | Reuben Gray | "Beautiful Mess" | |
| 2022 | Freeform Five | "No More Conversations" (re-release) | |
| 2021 | Nicola Roberts | "Crash" | Cinderella's Eyes (re-issue) |
| 2021 | Nicola Roberts | "Head" | Cinderella's Eyes (re-issue) |
| 2021 | ELM | "Only Dancer" | |
| 2021 | Betta Lemme | "I Love The Weekend" | |
| 2021 | Danté Klein & Hiddn | "Do What Friends Do" | |
| 2020 | Steps | "To the One" | What the Future Holds |
| 2020 | Phantoms | "Somebody" ft. Hannah Robinson | Moonlight |
| 2020 | GFriend | "Apple" | Song Of The Sirens |
| 2020 | Louise | "Hammer" | Heavy Love |
| 2020 | Louise | "Villain" | Heavy Love |
| 2019 | Will Young | "Dreaming Big" | Lexicon |
| 2019 | Bananarama | "Love In Stereo" | In Stereo |
| 2018 | Metro Boomin | "Overdue" (with Travis Scott) | Not All Heroes Wear Capes |
| 2018 | Kovacs | "Black Spider" | Cheap Smell |
| 2018 | Kovacs | "Priceless" | Cheap Smell |
| 2018 | Kovacs | "Cheap Smell" | Cheap Smell |
| 2016 | Sonia Stein | "One of Those Things" | One of Those Things EP |
| 2016 | The Knocks | "Love Me Like That" (featuring Carly Rae Jepsen) | 55 |
| 2016 | Foxes | "All I Need" | All I Need |
| 2015 | Say Lou Lou | "Beloved" | Lucid Dreaming |
| 2015 | Say Lou Lou | "Wilder Than The Wind" | Lucid Dreaming |
| 2015 | Say Lou Lou | "Peppermint" | Lucid Dreaming |
| 2013 | Say Lou Lou | "Beloved" | Better in The Dark EP |
| 2013 | Annie | "Hold On" | The A&R EP |
| 2013 | The Good Natured | "5-Ht" | 5-Ht |
| 2013 | Zara Larsson | "In Love With Myself" | Introducing EP |
| 2012 | Icona Pop | "Downtown" | Icona Pop |
| 2012 | Icona Pop | "Flashback" | Icona Pop |
| 2012 | Icona Pop | "Rocket Science" [Spotify Exclusive] | Icona Pop |
| 2012 | Zowie | "Anodyne" | Love Demolition |
| 2012 | Lana Del Rey | "Lolita" | Born to Die |
| 2011 | Christophe Willem | "L'amour Me Gagne" | Prismophonic |
| 2011 | Sophie Ellis-Bextor | "Bittersweet" | Make a Scene |
| 2011 | Sophie Ellis-Bextor | "Starlight" | Make a Scene |
| 2011 | Sophie Ellis-Bextor | "Under Your Touch" | Make a Scene |
| 2011 | Sophie Ellis-Bextor | "Magic" | Make a Scene |
| 2011 | Sophie Ellis-Bextor | "Dial My Number" | Make a Scene |
| 2011 | CocknBullKid | "Yellow" | Adulthood |
| 2011 | CocknBullKid | "The Hoarder" | Adulthood |
| 2010 | Kylie Minogue | "Can't Beat The Feeling" | Aphrodite |
| 2010 | The Saturdays | "Flashback" | Ego |
| 2009 | Annie | "Songs Remind Me of You" | Don't Stop |
| 2009 | Annie | "Marie Cherie" | Don't Stop |
| 2009 | Annie | "I Know UR Girlfriend Hates Me" | All Nite EP |
| 2009 | Annie | "Anthonio" | All Nite EP |
| 2009 | The Saturdays | "I Can't Wait" | Forever Is Over |
| 2009 | Anthonio / Heartbreak | "Annie" | Annie |
| 2009 | Annie | "Ferret Summer" | Anthonio |
| 2009 | Natalia | "Suspicion" | Wise Girl |
| 2009 | Saint Etienne | "Method of Modern Love" | London Conversations: The Best of Saint Etienne |
| 2008 | The Saturdays | "Why Me, Why Now" | Chasing Lights |
| 2008 | Heidi | "Encore" | Audio Ballerina |
| 2008 | Electrovamp | "Drinks Taste Better When They're Free" | How to Lose Friends & Alienate People Soundtrack |
| 2008 | Ladyhawke | "My Delirium" | Ladyhawke |
| 2008 | Ladyhawke | "Dusk Till Dawn" | Ladyhawke |
| 2008 | Jennifer Paige | "Best Kept Secret" | Best Kept Secret |
| 2008 | Stefanie Heinzmann | "Masterplan" | Masterplan |
| 2008 | Michelle | "Baby Don't Stop the Music" | Melodi Grand Prix 2008 |
| 2007 | Lorie | "Le bonheur a tout prix!" | 2lor en moi ? |
| 2007 | Dannii Minogue | "Feel Like I Do" | Club Disco |
| 2007 | Dannii Minogue | "You Won't Forget About Me" | Club Disco |
| 2007 | Dannii Minogue | "No Romeo" | Unleashed |
| 2007 | Sophie Ellis-Bextor | "Me and My Imagination" | Trip the Light Fantastic |
| 2007 | Sophie Ellis-Bextor | "China Heart" | Trip the Light Fantastic |
| 2007 | Sophie Ellis-Bextor | "What Have We Started?" | Trip the Light Fantastic |
| 2007 | No Angels | "Misguided Heart" | Destiny |
| 2007 | Sarah Nixey | "Nothing on Earth" | Sing, Memory |
| 2006 | Emma Bunton | "I Wasn't Looking (When I Found Love)" | Life in Mono |
| 2006 | Sophie Ellis-Bextor | "Dear Jimmy" | Popjustice: 100% Solid Pop Music |
| 2006 | Jamelia | "Real Love" | Beware of the Dog |
| 2006 | Jamelia | "Do Me Right" | Walk with Me |
| 2006 | Jamelia | "Window Shopping" | Walk with Me |
| 2006 | Jamelia | "Ain't a Love" | Walk with Me |
| 2006 | Jamelia | "Got It So Good" | Walk with Me |
| 2006 | Jamelia | "Hustle" | Walk with Me |
| 2005 | Rachel Stevens | "So Good" | Come and Get It |
| 2005 | Rachel Stevens | "Crazy Boys" | Come and Get It |
| 2005 | Rachel Stevens | "I Will Be There" | Come and Get It |
| 2005 | Rachel Stevens | "Some Girls" | Come and Get It |
| 2005 | Rachel Stevens | "Waiting Game" | I Said Never Again |
| 2005 | Rachel Stevens | "Never Go Back" | So Good |
| 2005 | Geri Halliwell | "Love Never Loved Me" | Passion |
| 2005 | Geri Halliwell | "There's Always Tomorrow" | Passion |
| 2005 | Geri Halliwell | "Let Me Love You More" | Passion |
| 2004 | Freeform Five | "No More Conversations" | Strangest Things |
| 2004 | Annie | "Chewing Gum" | Anniemal |
| 2004 | Annie | "Me Plus One" | Anniemal |
| 2003 | Sugababes | "Down Down" | Too Lost in You |
| 2003 | Liberty X | "Everybody Cries" | Being Somebody |
| 2003 | Dannii Minogue | "Hey! (So What)" | Neon Nights |
| 2003 | Dannii Minogue | "Come and Get It" | Neon Nights |
| 2003 | S Club 8 | "Searching For Perfection" | Sundown |
| 2003 | S Club 8 | "Sail on Through" | Sundown |
| 2002 | S Club Juniors | "Only You" | Together |

== See also ==
- List of Billboard number-one dance club songs
- List of artists who reached number one on the U.S. Dance Club Songs chart
