= Dance Like a Star =

EP by The Human League
- Released: September 2002
- Recorded: Sheffield, 1977
- Genre: Electronic music
- Length: 23:23
- Label: Black Melody
- Producers: Tim Pearce; The Human League

The Human League chronology
Secrets (2001)	Dance Like a Star (2002)	The Golden Hour of the Future (2002)

Dance Like a Star is an EP released in the UK in September 2002. It was released by Black Melody Records on behalf of the original lineup of the British synth-pop band The Human League and contains very early tracks recorded in 1977 when the Human League were known briefly as The Future. All tracks are previously unreleased. The record is a limited edition 12-inch vinyl EP released as a companion to The Golden Hour of the Future, CD released in October 2002. Only 2000 copies of the 12-inch were ever pressed.

== Track listing ==
1. "Dance Like a Star" (V.1) (Oakey/Marsh/Ware)
2. "C’est Grave" (Trad arr Marsh/Ware)
3. "Titled U.N." (Marsh/Ware)
4. "Dance Like a Star" (V.2) (Oakey/Marsh/Ware)
5. "Treatment" (Marsh/Ware)
6. "The Last Man on Earth" (Marsh/Ware)
