= Anthonio (song) =

Single by Annie

from the album Don't Stop
- B-side: "Ferret Summer"
- Released: 4 May 2009
- Recorded: 2009
- Genre: Synthpop; Italo disco
- Length: 3:21
- Label: Pleasure Masters
- Songwriter(s): Anne Lilia Berge Strand; Richard X; Hannah Robinson
- Producer(s): Richard X

Annie singles chronology
"I Know UR Girlfriend Hates Me" (2008)	"Anthonio" (2009)	"Songs Remind Me of You" (2009)

"Anthonio" is a song by Norwegian singer and songwriter Annie from the special edition of her second studio album, Don't Stop (2009). The song was written by Annie, Richard X and Hannah Robinson, and produced by Richard X. The track was released as a single on 4 May 2009 by Pleasure Masters, marking Annie's debut on the label. It was released digitally and in limited edition CD and 12" formats.

== Background ==
Annie described the song as "the ultimate summer track" and revealed it was based on a real-life encounter with a man named Anthonio she met in Rio de Janeiro at Carnival. She said of the song, "I think every girl has met an Anthonio, or will do at some point at least! There's an Anthonio in every city and you're sure to meet him when you least expect it!" In the song, Annie describes a brief but passionate encounter between herself and the namesake of the song, Anthonio. Annie's character in the song never sees Anthonio again and is rebuffed by her attempts to contact him. The song concludes with the final couplet "It may come as a surprise/My baby has your eyes", revealing that Annie gave birth to Anthonio's child.

=== Answer song ===
Shortly after "Anthonio" was released, a Myspace page belonging to the character of Anthonio Mendes started to leave messages on Annie's own MySpace page, some of them remorseful. An answer song named "Annie" subsequently surfaced on the Internet, reportedly by "Anthonio". The song was actually recorded by Heartbreak's Sebastian Muravchix. Three hundred copies of a limited edition vinyl release of the song were made available 11 May 2009, which included the B-side "Angel Face", a cover of The Glitter Band single of the same name, featuring Annie on additional vocals.

== Release and reception ==
"Anthonio" was released via Richard X's independent record label, Pleasure Masters. The Fred Falke and Designer Drugs remixes were released to Beatport on 20 April 2009. A CD single, a 12-inch single and two digital download formats were made available, all including remixes of the song. Limited edition handmade singles were released, limited to just one hundred copies. The single came in a coloured envelope addressed to Anthonio, with Norwegian stamps and a "return to sender" mark (a reference to the lyrics). It also included a handwritten letter from Annie to Anthonio, a photograph of Annie with her and Anthonio's lovechild Sam, in addition to the compact disc.

"Anthonio" was critically acclaimed by music blogs and various other music critics. David Balls of Digital Spy gave the song five out of five stars, saying "it contains all the right ingredients to become the anthem of the summer." Fraser McAlpine of BBC's Chart Blog described it as "hauntingly good". The Fred Falke remix of "Anthonio" also received attention; Matthew Richardson from Prefix felt that the remix "completely sea change[s] the hurt tone of the original, and make[s] Annie's questions sound curious as opposed to pleading", while Pitchfork Media's Chris Gaerig viewed it as "a much less jagged and reflexive affair. The sharp and ominous electronic punches of 'Anthonio' are replaced by an underscored melodic march and slowed pace; a more fitting landscape for Annie's soft, volumeless vocals. And the slowly crescendoing accompaniment during the chorus is more similar to the kind of happy-go-lucky charm of Anniemal."

The Berlin Breakdown Version of "Anthonio" is included on the soundtrack to the 2014 thriller film The Guest.

=== B-side ===
The digital EP and limited edition CD of "Anthonio" included a brand-new B-side, "Ferret Summer". The song was first referenced in a September 2005 interview with Peter Robinson for The Times. The song was inspired by a 14-year-old fan of Annie's whose ferret got lost and died. Annie said, "I shouldn't laugh [...] But she was crying. I was with Richard and Hannah, so we wrote a song called 'Ferret Summer'. It's about a ferret going into the sea and being lost for ever." A thirty-second clip of the single was premiered by Digital Spy on 1 May 2009, who called it "a gem of a B-side that's sure to surprise some of Annie's traditional fanbase." The review continued that the song "features the same Ibiza-ready beats as its A-side, but it assumes the role of a more mellow and ambient bedfellow. [...] Serving as the perfect antidote to the euphoric 'Anthonio', 'Ferret Summer' is destined to soundtrack those early morning come-downs spent watching the sun rise slowly over the horizon."

== Track listings ==
- CD single and 12" single

(Released 11 May 2009)

1. "Anthonio" – 3:21
2. "Anthonio" (Designer Drugs Remix) – 4:59
3. "Anthonio" (Fred Falke Remix) – 7:20
4. "Anthonio" (Berlin Breakdown Version) – 4:06
- Digital single

(Released 4 May 2009)

1. "Anthonio" – 3:21
2. "Anthonio" (Designer Drugs Remix) – 4:59
- Digital EP and limited edition CD single

(Released 4 May 2009)

1. "Anthonio" – 3:21
2. "Anthonio" (Designer Drugs Remix) – 4:59
3. "Anthonio" (Fred Falke Remix) – 7:20
4. "Anthonio" (Berlin Breakdown Version) – 4:06
5. "Anthonio" (Vaughn_e Remix) – 2:56
6. "Ferret Summer" – 4:43
- Beatport EP

(Released 20 April 2009)

1. "Anthonio" (Fred Falke Remix) – 7:20
2. "Anthonio" (Fred Falke Instrumental Mix) – 7:20
3. "Anthonio" (Designer Drugs Remix) – 5:00
4. "Anthonio" (Designer Drugs Instrumental Mix) – 4:58
- 2014 digital single

(Released 15 September 2014)

1. "Anthonio" (Berlin Breakdown Version Remastered) – 4:09
2. "Anthonio" (Berlin Breakdown Instrumental) – 4:16

== Credits and personnel ==
Credits adapted from the liner notes of the special edition of Don't Stop.

- Annie – songwriting, vocals
- Pete "18-30" Hofmann – mixing
- Richard X – production, songwriting
- Hannah Robinson – songwriting

== Charts ==
Chart (2009)	Peak position
UK Indie (OCC)	5
