= Happy Without You =

Single by Annie

from the album Anniemal
- Released: 11 July 2005
- Genre: Pop, electronic
- Length: 3:16
- Label: 679
- Songwriter(s): Annie, Timo Kaukolampi
- Producer(s): Annie, Timo Kaukolampi

Annie singles chronology
"Heartbeat" (2005)	"Happy Without You" (2005)	"Always Too Late" (2005)

"Happy Without You" is a song by Norwegian recording artist Annie from her debut album, Anniemal (2004). Written and produced by Annie and Timo Kaukolampi, the song was released as the album's third single in July 2005.

== Critical reception ==
"Happy Without You" received mixed reviews from pop music critics. In a review for Slant Magazine, Sal Cinquemani praised the song for its "mix of live drums and...synth-guitar solo". William B. Swygart of Stylus Magazine wrote that the song was not "particularly hooky or catchy".

== Track listings ==
- CD single

(ANNIEMIX #01CD; Released 2005)

1. "Happy Without You" (Riton vocal mix) – 4:44
2. "Happy Without You" (SebastiAn remix) – 5:10
3. "Happy Without You" (Riton instrumental) – 4:42
- 12" single

(ANNIEMIX #001; Released 2005)

1. "Happy Without You" (Riton vocal mix) – 4:44
2. "Happy Without You" (SebastiAn remix) – 5:10
3. "Happy Without You" (Riton instrumental) – 4:42
- Digital download

(Released 11 July 2005)

1. "Happy Without You" (Riton vocal mix) – 4:44
2. "Happy Without You" (SebastiAn remix) – 5:10
3. "Happy Without You" (Riton instrumental) – 4:42

== Personnel ==
Credits adapted from the liner notes of Anniemal.

- Annie – lead vocals, production
- Abdissa Assefa – percussion
- Timo Kaukolampi – production
- Tuomo Puranen – bass
- Yngve Sætre – mixing
