= Songs Remind Me of You =

Single by Annie

from the album Don't Stop
- Released: 17 August 2009
- Recorded: 2006
- Genre: Italo disco; synth-pop
- Length: 4:06
- Label: Totally; Smalltown Supersound
- Songwriter(s): Richard X; Hannah Robinson
- Producer(s): Richard X

Annie singles chronology
| "Anthonio" (2009) | "Songs Remind Me of You" (2009) | "My Love Is Better" (2009) |

"Songs Remind Me of You" is a song by Norwegian singer Annie from her second studio album, Don't Stop (2009). Written by Richard X and Hannah Robinson, the track was released digitally on 17 August 2009 as the album's lead single.

== Background ==
The song, described as "Annie's first true four-to-the-floor anthem leading to dancefloor abandon", was produced by Richard X. It dates back to 2006, recorded with Richard X in London during the earlier sessions for Don't Stop.

== Release and reception ==
"Songs Remind Me of You" was first released on a Don't Stop album sampler in April 2008, and it later leaked with the rest of the album that year. After Annie left Island Records, a revised edition of the album was released through Annie's own label Totally Records and Oslo-based indie label Smalltown Supersound in November 2009. "Songs Remind Me of You" was released as its lead single via iTunes on 17 August 2009. It was reissued digitally on 20 July 2010, featuring brand-new cover art and a remix by Australian trio The Swiss.

The track received critical acclaim upon its release. Peter Robinson of Popjustice simply called the song "amazing." Ian Wade of BBC Music described it as "a blinding snort-up of amyl disco strobe-fest proportions, which throws in a bit of Mel & Kim just in case it wasn't quite rapturous enough." Slant Magazine's Sal Cinquemani referred to the song as "a rollicking Italo disco nugget." Pitchfork's Kasia Galazka scored the track eight out of ten and gave it a "Best New Music" designation, commenting that it is "happily 80s meta-pop, and the quicksand melody in the chorus is infatuating." Bradley Stern of MuuMuse praised it as a mixture of "lush disco, breathy vocals, and intergalactic swarms of electronica."

The original song was featured in the 2010 film Sex and the City 2, and the Swiss remix was featured in the 2015 film We Are Your Friends.

== Track listings ==
- 2009 digital single
1. "Songs Remind Me of You" – 4:05
- 2010 digital reissue
1. "Songs Remind Me of You" – 4:05
2. "Songs Remind Me of You" (The Swiss Remix) – 6:01
3. "Songs Remind Me of You" (The Swiss Remix Instrumental) – 6:01

== Charts ==
| Chart (2010) | Peak position |
|---|---|
| Japan Hot 100 | 60 |
