= BIT Teatergarasjen =

Norwegian theatre and dance company

Coordinates: 60°23′51.8″N 5°18′41.3″E

BIT Teatergarasjen (BIT) is a producer and co-producer of international contemporary theatre and dance in Norway. It emphasises projects that stimulate international co-production and co-operations between different fields of art.

BIT was established as a festival in 1983/84, and changed into an all-year theatre in 1990. The program consists of approximately 50% theatre productions and 50% dance productions.

BIT is one of the main producers and co-producers of international contemporary theatre and dance in Norway. BIT co-operates with theatres and producers in several European countries. BIT has no artistic crew employed; it works mostly with established companies.

BIT's artistic director is Sven Birkeland and its managing director is Mette Helgesen.
