= Don't Stop (Annie album) =

Studio album by Annie
- Released: 19 October 2009
- Recorded: 2006–2009
- Genres: Electropop; synth-pop; indie electronic
- Length: 46:02
- Labels: Totally; Smalltown Supersound
- Producers: Annie; Paul Epworth; Brian Higgins; Timo Kaukolampi; Richard X; Xenomania

Annie chronology
iTunes Live: London Festival '08 (2008)	Don't Stop (2009)	Wednesday Mix (2009)

Singles from Don't Stop
- 1. "I Know UR Girlfriend Hates Me" Released: 14 July 2008; 2. "Anthonio" Released: 4 May 2009; 3. "Songs Remind Me of You" Released: 17 August 2009; 4. "My Love Is Better" Released: 9 October 2009

Don't Stop is the second studio album by Norwegian singer Annie. Originally intended for a 2008 release on UK-based label Island Records, the planned release date was pushed back. Annie left Island for Norwegian independent label Smalltown Supersound, which released a revised version of the album in October 2009.

Don't Stop received generally positive reviews from music critics. The album features production work from previous collaborators Timo Kaukolampi and Richard X, as well as Xenomania and Paul Epworth.

== Background ==
In May 2008, Popjustice called the album "a complete modern masterpiece", while revealing the title (Don't Stop) and the first track listing. Pitchfork posted a different track listing two months later, which excluded a track entitled "Perfectly Honest", while "Misery" was renamed "I Can't Let Go".

British girl group Girls Aloud initially provided backing vocals for the song "My Love Is Better". Annie said that while she was recording the song, Girls Aloud were recording their single "Can't Speak French" in one of the recording studios, and that the group would end up doing backing vocals for the song.

Annie received tabloid attention when the group requested the song be removed from the album. Producer Brian Higgins was reported to have based the song around the vocal tracks from a Girls Aloud demo without their permission. Annie told Digital Spy in an interview that "it's not as dramatic as they said in the papers". In another interview with Wears The Trousers, Annie said:

When I was doing ‘My Love Is Better’ they were recording ‘I Can’t Speak French’ so they were around all the time. Brian just asked them if they wanted to sing backing vocals on my song and they were really up for it – they had heard ‘Chewing Gum’ before – so, yeah, it was really really fun. But then of course their record company said no and they ended up not singing on the song after all. I thought it was a little bit stupid but what can you say? It wasn’t my choice. They were really nice, very sweet.

The issue was resolved and the song remained on Annie's album.

Alex Kapranos and Nick McCarthy of Franz Ferdinand play guitar on "Loco". "I Can't Let Go" features guest vocals from Fredrik Saroea of Datarock. The album cover shows Annie wearing a dress by French fashion designer Jean-Charles de Castelbajac.

== Promotion and release ==
The first single was initially going to be a cover of Stacey Q's 1986 song "Two of Hearts", backed with "Songs Remind Me of You". The release was listed as "still forthcoming" on producer Richard X's official website during a period of time. It was suggested that the album could see an April 2008 release.

A sampler album was released in April for promotional purposes, containing the songs "I Know UR Girlfriend Hates Me", "My Love Is Better", "When the Night", "Marie Cherie" and "Songs Remind Me of You". A megamix containing samples of the album's songs was subsequently released.

On 22 September 2008, Annie's manager Kathrine Synnes told Norwegian newspaper Dagbladet that the album's release had been postponed to 2009 so that Island Records could spend more time on the album.

Annie reported in a Myspace blog post on 8 October 2008 that "Two of Hearts" would be released as the next single from Don't Stop on 27 October 2008 but was cancelled last minute due to legal issues with Island Records. The following month, Annie left Island Records, taking the masters of the album with her. She subsequently announced that Don't Stop would be released in 2009 with a different track listing from the one leaked onto the Internet.

The album finally saw a release on 19 October 2009 with a revised track listing and new artwork. New songs "Hey Annie", title track "Don't Stop" and "I Don't Like Your Band" were added to the album's final track listing. "I Know UR Girlfriend Hates Me" and "Anthonio" were released on a bonus disc, titled All Night EP, among "Sweet", "I Can't Let Go" and new song "All Night".

According to Nielsen SoundScan, Don't Stop had sold 6,000 copies in the United States as of August 2013.

=== Singles ===
"I Know UR Girlfriend Hates Me" was released on 14 July 2008 as the album's first official single. The song was described as "sweet, scrumptious electropop" by Digital Spy. Pitchfork wrote that the song had "the slinky electro-pop strut" of Saint Etienne and Annie's previous single "Chewing Gum". The music video, directed by Sarah Chatfield, premiered online in late April 2008. The follow-up single, "Anthonio", was released on 4 May 2009 by the Pleasure Masters label.

"Songs Remind Me of You" was released on 17 August 2009 as the third single overall, and was the first song from the album's standard edition to be released as a single. The final single, "My Love Is Better", was released digitally on 9 October 2009, and was later reissued as a 12-inch single on 15 March 2010.

== Critical reception ==
Professional ratings
Aggregate scores
Source	Rating
Metacritic	77/100
Review scores
Source	Rating
AllMusic	3.5/5 stars
The A.V. Club	B+
Drowned in Sound	7/10
Entertainment Weekly	B+
The Guardian	4/5 stars
musicOMH	4.5/5 stars
NME	8/10
Pitchfork	7.2/10
Rolling Stone	3.5/5 stars
Slant Magazine	3.5/5 stars

Don't Stop received generally positive reviews from most music critics. At Metacritic, which assigns a normalised rating out of 100 to reviews from mainstream publications, the album received an average score of 77, based on 22 reviews. Joseph Brannigan Lynch of Entertainment Weekly described the album as "a savvy mix of energetic early-'80s synth-pop and indie electronic", noting that Annie is "as close to LCD Soundsystem as to Kylie Minogue. Her vocals switch between seen-it-all sass and breathy melancholy with convincing ease." The Guardian's Michael Hann praised it as "a delightful confection, filled with attention to detail and perfectly turned—and deserving of your attention." The A.V. Club's Michaelangelo Matos referred to the album's music as "high-grade, glossy electro-pop, heavily indebted to the '80s." BBC Music reviewer Ian Wade stated that "Don't Stop is 12 slices of sublime pop genius, and one ranks right up there with the best contemporary female pop." Michael Cragg of musicOMH raved, "Featuring some of the most inventive producers in pop and steered by a singer who knows her way round a catchy melody or five, Don't Stop is one of the best pop albums of 2009." Drowned in Sound's David Renshaw called the album "brilliant", adding that "[t]he production throughout Don't Stop is noticeably strong. The sound is taught and modern but avoids the current pitfalls of sounding like a prime cut of Stock, Aitken and Waterman Eighties chart fodder or a Timbaland reject circa the year 2001".

Christopher Muther of The Boston Globe viewed the album as "an electro-pop truffle—a tasty confection with a hard, glossy shell surrounding a smooth, melt-in-your-ear interior of cheeky, playful lyrics", while commending Annie for her "incredible knack for marrying Pat Benatar's lip-gloss feminist swagger with playful dance-club melodies." AllMusic critic Andy Kellman wrote, "As on Anniemal, Don't Stop contains some of the catchiest, most clever dance-pop in circulation, highlighted by the fizzy 'I Don't Like Your Band'", but argued that the collaborations with Xenomania, Timo Kaukolampi and Richard X "aren't as powerful, [...] with a good handful of their songs no match for Anniemal's weaker moments." Rolling Stone's Will Hermes commented that the album "refines [Annie's] Euro-disco with more flavors and fewer hooks. Still, the music remains rapturous and cheeky." Craig Carson of PopMatters expressed that the album "exudes polish, depth, and the sense that Annie is moving confidently forward as a pop artist of the first order", concluding, "All tracks considered, Annie makes a significant step forward with Don't Stop." Ailbhe Malone of NME noted, "Though production is split three ways between Xenomania, Paul Epworth and Timo Kaukolampi, the record is all Annie's own." Sal Cinquemani of Slant Magazine opined that while Xenomania's contributions are "largely hit or miss", "the album's true highlights, not surprisingly, belong to Timo Kaukolampi and Richard X, the pair responsible for the bulk of Annie's debut". Matthew Perpetua of Pitchfork felt that "[n]ot every song on Don't Stop or its bonus All Night EP is a classic, but Annie's good taste has yielded another fine crop of pop tunes."

== Track listing ==
No.	Title	Writer(s)	Producer(s)	Length
1.	"Hey Annie"	Anne Lilia Berge Strand; Paul Epworth; Heidrun Bjornsdottir	Annie; Epworth	4:08
2.	"My Love Is Better"	Strand; Miranda Cooper; Brian Higgins; Nick Coler; Tim Powell	Higgins; Xenomania	3:19
3.	"Bad Times"	Strand; Cooper; Higgins; Coler; Powell	Higgins; Xenomania	3:57
4.	"Don't Stop"	Strand; Epworth; Bjornsdottir	Annie; Epworth	4:10
5.	"I Don't Like Your Band"	Strand; Epworth; Bjornsdottir	Annie; Epworth	3:25
6.	"Songs Remind Me of You"	Richard X; Hannah Robinson	Richard X	4:06
7.	"Marie Cherie"	Strand; Timo Kaukolampi; Yngve Sætre; Robinson	Kaukolampi	5:15
8.	"Take You Home"	Strand; Kaukolampi	Kaukolampi	4:26
9.	"The Breakfast Song"	Strand; Kaukolampi	Kaukolampi	3:10
10.	"Loco"	Strand; Cooper; Higgins; Coler; Powell	Higgins; Xenomania	3:13
11.	"When the Night"	Strand; Cooper; Higgins; Coler; Powell	Higgins; Xenomania	3:31
12.	"Heaven and Hell"	Strand; Cooper; Higgins; Coler; Powell	Higgins; Xenomania	3:23

Digital bonus track
No.	Title	Writer(s)	Producer(s)	Length
13.	"My Love Is Better" (Justin Robertson Remix)	Strand; Cooper; Higgins; Coler; Powell	Higgins; Xenomania; Robertson^{[a]}	6:29

Japanese edition bonus tracks
No.	Title	Writer(s)	Producer(s)	Length
13.	"All Night"	Strand; Epworth	Annie; Epworth	4:14
14.	"I Know UR Girlfriend Hates Me"	Strand; Richard X; Robinson; Kaukolampi	Richard X	3:07
15.	"Anthonio"	Strand; Richard X; Robinson	Richard X	3:12
16.	"I Can't Let Go"	Strand; Kaukolampi	Kaukolampi	3:42
17.	"Sweet"	Strand; Cooper; Higgins; Coler; Powell	Higgins; Xenomania	2:52
18.	"My Love Is Better" (Emperor Machine Vocal Mix)	Strand; Cooper; Higgins; Coler; Powell	Higgins; Xenomania; Emperor Machine^{[a]}	6:09
19.	"My Love Is Better" (Justin Robertson Remix)	Strand; Cooper; Higgins; Coler; Powell	Higgins; Xenomania; Robertson^{[a]}	6:29

Special edition bonus disc – All Night EP
No.	Title	Writer(s)	Producer(s)	Length
1.	"All Night"	Strand; Epworth	Annie; Epworth	4:14
2.	"I Know UR Girlfriend Hates Me"	Strand; Richard X; Robinson; Kaukolampi	Richard X	3:07
3.	"Anthonio"	Strand; Richard X; Robinson	Richard X	3:12
4.	"I Can't Let Go"	Strand; Kaukolampi	Kaukolampi	3:42
5.	"Sweet"	Strand; Cooper; Higgins; Coler; Powell	Higgins; Xenomania	2:52

Notes

- ^{^[a]} signifies a remixer

== Personnel ==
Credits adapted from the liner notes of Don't Stop.

Musicians

- Annie – vocals (all tracks); keyboards (track 3)
- Tim Powell – keyboards (tracks 2, 3, 10–12); programming (tracks 2, 3, 10–12); additional programming (tracks 8, 9)
- Brian Higgins – keyboards, programming (tracks 2, 3, 10–12)
- Nick Coler – keyboards (tracks 2, 3, 10, 11); programming (tracks 2, 3, 9, 10–12); guitar (tracks 2, 3, 10–12)
- Timo Kaukolampi – programming (track 2)
- Matt Gray – programming (tracks 2, 10, 12)
- Owen Parker – guitar (tracks 2, 3, 11, 12); keyboards (tracks 11, 12)
- Hannah Robinson – background vocals (track 6)
- Richard X – background vocals (track 6)
- Yngve Sætre – violin arrangements (track 7); additional programming (track 8)
- Mari Persen – violin (track 7)
- Chris Sanders – marching drums (track 7)
- Ercola – additional programming (tracks 8, 9)
- Geoff Sanoff – additional programming (track 8)
- Tomi Leppänen – drums (track 9)
- Toby Scott – additional programming (track 9)
- Alex Kapranos – guitar (track 10)
- Nick McCarthy – guitar (track 10)

Technical

- Annie – production (tracks 1, 4, 5)
- Paul Epworth – production (tracks 1, 4, 5)
- Brian Higgins – production (tracks 2, 3, 10–12); mixing (tracks 3, 12)
- Xenomania – production (tracks 2, 3, 10–12)
- Jeremy Wheatley – mixing (tracks 2, 10, 11)
- Richard Edgeler – mixing assistance (tracks 2, 10, 11)
- Tim Powell – mixing (tracks 3, 12)
- Richard X – production (track 6)
- Pete Hofmann – mixing (track 6)
- Timo Kaukolampi – production (tracks 7–9)
- Matt Gray – mixing (tracks 7–9)

Artwork

- Nina Merikallio – front cover, photography
- Annie – front cover, design
- Blank Blank – front cover, design
- Aki Pekka-Sinikoski – photography
- Petri Henriksson – photography

=== All Night EP ===
Credits adapted from the liner notes of the special edition of Don't Stop.

Musicians

- Annie – vocals (all tracks)
- Timo Kaukolampi – programming (track 2)
- Ercola – programming (track 2); additional programming (track 4)
- Hannah Robinson – background vocals (track 2)
- Petri Kautto – guitar (track 2)
- Fredrik Saroea – guest vocals (track 4)
- James Iha – boogie guitars (track 4)
- Yngve Sætre – additional programming (track 4)
- Geoff Sanoff – additional programming (track 4)
- Tim Powell – additional programming (track 4); keyboards, programming (track 5)
- Brian Higgins – keyboards (track 5)
- Nick Coler – programming, guitar (track 5)
- Owen Parker – guitar (track 5)

Technical

- Annie – production (track 1)
- Paul Epworth – production (track 1)
- Richard X – production (tracks 2, 3)
- Pete Hofmann – mixing (tracks 2, 3)
- Timo Kaukolampi – production (track 4)
- Matt Gray – mixing (track 4)
- Xenomania – production (track 5)
- Tim Powell – mixing (track 5)

== Charts ==
Chart (2009)	Peak position
Norwegian Albums (VG-lista)	25
UK Albums (Official Charts)	126
UK Independent Albums (Official Charts)	15
US Top Dance Albums (Billboard)	12
US Heatseekers Albums (Billboard)	23

== Release history ==
Region	Date	Label	Ref.
United Kingdom	19 October 2009	Totally; Smalltown Supersound	
Norway	26 October 2009	Totally; Smalltown Supersound	
United States	17 November 2009	Totally; Smalltown Supersound	
Japan	2 December 2009	P-Vine	
