= Heartbeat (Annie song) =

2004 song by Annie

Single by Annie

from the album Anniemal
- B-side: "Kiss Me"
- Released: 29 November 2004
- Genre: Pop
- Length: 3:05
- Label: 679
- Songwriter(s): Annie; Svein Berge; Torbjørn Brundtland
- Producer(s): Svein Berge; Torbjørn Brundtland

Annie singles chronology
"Chewing Gum" (2004)	"Heartbeat" (2004)	"Happy Without You" (2005)

Alternative cover
- UK CD single #2

"Heartbeat" is a song by the Norwegian singer Annie from her first studio album, Anniemal (2004). She co-wrote the song with its producers, Svein Berge and Torbjørn Brundtland. It was released under the title "My Heart Beat" as the album's second single in 29 November 2004. The lyrics of "Heartbeat" describe finding new love at a nightclub, surrounded by close friends. The song received acclaim from music critics.

"Heartbeat" was listed at number one on Pitchfork's top 50 singles of 2004 and at number 17 on its list of the top 500 songs of the 2000s. It was used in two scenes of the 2005 film Melissa P., based on the Italian writer Melissa Panarello's first novel.

== Composition ==
"Heartbeat" is a pop song composed in F-sharp minor. It is written in common time and at a tempo of 128 beats per minute. The song uses a i-VI-iv-v chord progression. There is a key change in the chorus that puts the song in B minor before going back to F-sharp minor for the subsequent verse. Its lyrics narrate a night of going to clubs with friends. "Heartbeat" uses a drum beat which symbolizes a heartbeat and doubles its tempo when Annie's persona catches the attention of her romantic interest on the dancefloor.

== Critical reception ==
"Heartbeat" received acclaim from music critics. Scott Plagenhoef's review for Pitchfork named it "the best song of the year" for being a "deceptively simple and surprisingly beautiful articulation of basic human need, beautifully encapsulating every element of human excitement". In his review for Rolling Stone magazine, Barry Walters remarked that the song "evokes your favorite punk/dance mash-up and betters it". For The Village Voice, Jody Rosen commented that the song's chorus "edges toward rock and a melody durable enough to withstand countless repeated listenings". Entertainment Weekly's Raymond Fiore referred to "Heartbeat" as an "indie-cred masterstroke".

"Heartbeat" was ranked 32nd on the 2004 Pazz & Jop list, a survey of several hundred music critics conducted by Robert Christgau. Pitchfork listed "Heartbeat" at the top of its list of the "Top 50 Singles of 2004" and called it "a perfect pop song". The publication then listed the song at #17 on its top 500 songs of the 2000s list. Pitchfork also included "Heartbeat" in its collection of The Pitchfork 500.

== Track listings ==
- European CD single

(50467-6266-5; Released 29 November 2004)

1. "My Heartbeat" (album version) – 3:05
2. "My Heartbeat" (Röyksopp's Mindre Tilgjengelige remix) – 5:54
- UK CD single #1

(679L091CD1; Released 21 February 2005)

1. "Heartbeat" – 3:00
2. "Heartbeat" (Alan Braxe remix) – 3:28
- UK CD single #2

(679L091CD2; Released 21 February 2005)

1. "Heartbeat" – 3:00
2. "Heartbeat" (Maurice Fulton remix) – 6:12
3. "Heartbeat" (Phones Maximo remix) – 4:23
4. "Heartbeat" music video
- US CD maxi single

(62305-2; Released 10 May 2005)

1. "Heartbeat" (album version) – 3:05
2. "Heartbeat" (Röyksopp's Mindre Tilgjengelige remix) – 5:54
3. "Heartbeat" (Maurice Fulton remix) – 6:12
4. "Heartbeat" (Phones Maximo remix) – 4:23
5. "Heartbeat" (Alan Braxe remix) – 5:43
6. "Chewing Gum" (Mylo remix) – 5:53
7. "Kiss Me" – 6:17

== Credits and personnel ==
- Annie – lead vocals
- Svein Berge – production, backing vocals, instruments
- Torbjørn Brundtland – production, backing vocals, instruments

== Charts ==
Chart (2005–2006)	Peak position
Belgium (Ultratip Bubbling Under Flanders)	7
Finland (Suomen virallinen lista)	17
Netherlands (Single Top 100)	77
Norway (VG-lista)	18
Scotland (OCC)	49
UK Singles (OCC)	50
US Dance Singles Sales (Billboard)	11
