= Op:l Bastards =

Finnish band

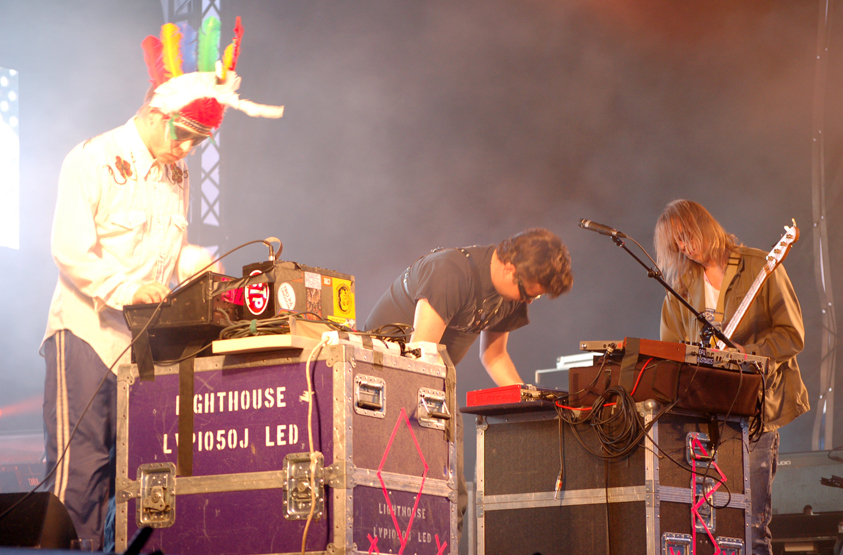
- Op:l Bastards performing at Flow Festival 2007. (L–R) Vilunki 3000, Timo Kaukolampi, and Tuomo Puranen.

Background information
- Also known as: Opel Bastards
- Origin: Helsinki, Finland
- Genres: Electronic
- Members: Timo Kaukolampi; Vilunki 3000; Tuomo Puranen

Op:l Bastards was a Finnish band formed by Timo Kaukolampi (born 1971), Vilunki 3000 (real name: Mikko Viljakainen, born 1973) and Tuomo Puranen from Helsinki. Kaukolampi and Vilunki had earlier on played in the garage rock band Larry and the Lefthanded. Their original name was Opel Bastards, but they had to change it due to the pressure from Opel company.

Their music is categorised as electronic music. They are described as having "specializ[ed] in Kraut-baiting impenetrability."

In 2007 Op:l Bastards had their first gig in five years on the 18th of August at Flow festival of Helsinki. The Job album was re-released on Op:l's record label Lefta Records in Finland, with liner notes written by Philip Oakey (of The Human League fame).

The group released their second album in 2009.

== Discography ==
=== Albums ===
- The Job (Form & Function 2001)
- The Job (remastered with 4 bonus tracks, Lefta/Jupiter 2007)
- II (Iron-Magnesium Records 2009)

=== Singles and EPs ===
- Opel Bastards (Bootsound America 1998)
- Sagittarius (Cool Globe Agency 1999)
- Spraybeat (Rex Records 1999)
- Funking (Form & Function 2000)
- Scorpius (Form & Function 2000)
- Don't Bring Me Down (Form & Function 2001)
- Sagittarius 3 (Cool Globe Agency 2002)
- Sagittarius III (Form & Function 2002)
