= Richard X =

- Also known as: Richard X
- Born: Richard Philips
- Origin: Whalley, Lancashire, England
- Genres: Electropop, synth-pop, dance-pop
- Occupations: Songwriter, music producer
- Years active: 2000–present
- Label: Virgin
- Website: BlackMelody.com

Richard Philips, better known by his stage name Richard X, is a British songwriter and music producer. Gaining attention as a pioneer of the bootleg craze, Richard X has earned success as a producer and remixer. He has helmed hit singles for artists including Annie, Kelis, Liberty X, Rachel Stevens and Sugababes. According to an early issue of the now defunct Popworld magazine, Philips' alias comes from a postcard which was sealed with a kiss misinterpreted for the letter X.

Richard X is known for his "synthesised, grungy pop music", which was inspired by bands such as Kraftwerk, the Human League, Ultravox, OMD and Saint Etienne. His original intention was to "reinvent" pop music by making records that are "deliberately unplayable". Referring to his 'Girls on Top' bootlegs, Richard X says, "At the time it was inspired by anti the po-facedness of the electronica scene as much as anything. The production side, how it sounded – rough and spiky, electronic and modern – was what did it for me. Taking pop and putting it through a blender sound wise was the spirit of the times."

== History ==
=== 2000–2004: Bootlegs and commercial breakthrough ===
Richard X started his career in the underground music scene creating popular mashup bootlegs, which are "illegal, under the counter remixes which combined two existing records to make an entirely new song." Under the pseudonym Girls on Top, Richard X released a series of vinyl-only underground singles. He says bootlegs were "escaping from that world of formatting – which the DJ culture and club culture relies on so much. They were supposed to be the future of pop music." His mashup "I Wanna Dance with Numbers" (a combination of Whitney Houston's "I Wanna Dance with Somebody (Who Loves Me)" and Kraftwerk's "Numbers") helped establish as the most common mashup template the combination of vocals from a female pop singer with a critically noteworthy song.

Island Records heard "We Don't Give a Damn About Our Friends", which was a mash-up of Adina Howard's "Freak Like Me" and Gary Numan/Tubeway Army's "Are 'Friends' Electric?", and requested that Sugababes record it. Richard X said he was "very keen to do it as long as it remained what it was. It was raw, it was against the grain and it was still pop music." Sugababes' version of the song, which kept the Adina Howard title of "Freak Like Me", was recorded in Richard X's flat in Tooting. He said, "there was a loop, some handclaps, the Sugababes and a semi-broken synthesiser." Released as the first single from Sugababes' second studio album Angels with Dirty Faces, it charted at number one on the UK Singles Chart, the first of many for the girl group.

As a result of the interest in Girls on Top and "Freak Like Me", Richard X was signed to Virgin Records. He collaborated with pop group Liberty X to create "Being Nobody", a mash-up of Chaka Khan's "Ain't Nobody" and The Human League's "Being Boiled". Richard X's next release was "Finest Dreams" with Kelis, which was a reworking of The SOS Band and Alexander O'Neal's "The Finest" with another The Human League song "The Things That Dreams Are Made Of". Both the Liberty X and Kelis collaborations charted within the top ten, at number three and number eight respectively. Richard X released his debut album Richard X Presents His X-Factor Vol. 1 in August 2003. The album featured "Freak Like Me", "Being Nobody", "Finest Dreams" as well as collaborations with Annie, Jarvis Cocker, Javine Hylton, and Tiga, among others. Richard X described the album as "modern, alternative, future-pop".

He also released Back to Mine Volume 17, as part of the long-running mix album series. His album included tracks by artists including Goldfrapp, Heaven 17, Jona Lewie, John Carpenter and Kelis.

=== 2004–present: Production ===
After the mainstream success of his bootlegs, Richard X turned his attention to original compositions. In July 2004, pop singer Rachel Stevens released "Some Girls", written by Richard X with Hannah Robinson. The song received critical acclaim and was another success for Richard X, charting at number two upon its release. Warp Records and Simon Fuller of 19 Entertainment contacted Richard X by email to ask that he give the song to Geri Halliwell or Stevens, respectively, to record. He agreed to have Stevens record the song after Richard Curtis asked about using the song for Sport Relief. When Halliwell found out that the writers were having Stevens record the song, she locked herself in her car in an attempt to change their minds, and she later wrote Richard X a love song. The aftermath of the decision for Stevens to record the song became the subject of another song written by Richard X and Robinson, "Me Plus One" from Annie's 2004 album Anniemal. Annie's album included another Richard X production, "Chewing Gum", which remains her biggest hit to date. Pitchfork ranked the track at number eleven on its list of the Top 50 Singles of 2004. Stylus Magazine listed it tenth on its list of the top 40 singles of 2004. Richard X also produced her 2006 gap single "Crush".

In 2004, Richard X worked with M.I.A. for her debut album Arular (2005). He co-wrote/produced "Amazon" and "10 Dollar", as well as "Hombre" under the pseudonym Dwain 'Willy' Wilson III. The latter featured a drum pattern created from the sounds made by toys that M.I.A. had bought in India, augmented with sounds produced by objects such as pens and mobile phones. M.I.A. also appeared on Richard X's remix of Ciara's "Goodies".

Richard X worked with Róisín Murphy and Sam Sparro on their albums Overpowered and Sam Sparro respectively. "Parallel Lives" appears on her second album Overpowered, while "Pandora" was used as a b-side. Richard X collaborated with Saint Etienne, co-writing and producing the 2009 single "Method of Modern Love". He also worked with Annie again for her 2009 album Don't Stop. He produced the singles "I Know UR Girlfriend Hates Me", "Anthonio", and "Songs Remind Me of You". The latter dates back to 2006. Richard X also produced Annie's cover of the Stacey Q song "Two of Hearts" for release as a digital download.

Richard X co-produced "Alive" for Goldfrapp's 2010 album Head First and worked with Sophie Ellis-Bextor on her 2011 album Make a Scene, producing and co-writing "Magic" and the single "Starlight". He also co-produced the entirety of Will Young's album Echoes (2011), which debuted at number one on the UK Albums Chart.

In 2013, Richard X worked with Erasure (Andy Bell and Vince Clarke) on their anticipated 16th studio album for fall 2014 release, a 10-track record titled The Violet Flame.

== Black Melody ==
Richard X created his own "production empire" Black Melody, which basically oversees all of his productions and remixes.

In October 2002, Richard X worked with The Human League members past and present to compile The Golden Hour of the Future, a collection of early recordings by The Human League and their predecessors The Future. The album was released via Black Melody and preceded by a limited edition 12" promo EP titled "Dance Like a Star".

In 2009, Richard X created the Pleasure Masters label for the sole purpose of releasing Annie's "Anthonio", which he co-wrote and produced, after her departure from Island Records.

== Work ethic ==
Richard X has been approached to work with many artists, but stays selective. "It's very much who tickles my fancy," he told BBC News. He has turned down a number of artists: "I am particular and probably turn down 90% of what I'm offered – I think it drives a few people around me mad. We try not to forget it's art and not just a job." He often works with people who are seen "as having similar ideals of creating innovative, forward thinking pop music", according to HitQuarters. Richard X says, "It's not so much a vision, more an ethos. I like the artist who stands alone or has the ideas that at first seem a little left of centre. Rather than chase a style, where you inevitably end up sounding second best, it's easier to do something new. If the artist is attempting something new they are creating a benchmark rather than trying to reach one."

He treats every song as a potential single. He says, "Each track has to stand alone. The song, the production and everything together. My reference point is always imagining finding it on a seven-inch [single] in a second hand shop when you were younger." Richard X cites this as a reason that he usually collaborates with artists on individual tracks: "I've always been about singles [...] it's bite sized, to the point, and let's be honest with some of the artists out there you really don't need to hear much beyond the hit."

Richard X also prefers to co-write songs, rather than solely producing them.

== Discography ==
=== Girls on Top ===
==== Albums ====
- Greatest Hits (April 2005)

==== Singles ====
- "Being Scrubbed" / "I Wanna Dance with Numbers" (January 2001)
- "Warm Bitch" / "We Don't Give a Damn About Our Friends" (August 2001)

=== Richard X ===
==== Albums ====
- Richard X Presents His X-Factor Vol. 1 (August 2003) – UK #31
- Back to Mine Volume 17 (April 2004)

==== Singles ====
- "Freak Like Me" (vs Sugababes) (April 2002) – UK #1
- "Being Nobody" (vs Liberty X) (March 2003) – UK #3
- "Finest Dreams" (featuring Kelis) (August 2003) – UK #8
- "You Used To" (featuring Javine) – cancelled
