= Anniemal =

Studio album by Annie
- Released: 28 September 2004
- Recorded: 1999, 2001–2004
- Genres: Electropop; Europop
- Length: 46:06
- Label: 679
- Producers: Annie, Richard X, Röyksopp, Veikka Ercola, Timo Kaukolampi, Yngve Sætre

Annie chronology
Anniemal (2004)	DJ-Kicks: Annie (2005)

Singles from Anniemal
- 1. "The Greatest Hit" Released: 1999; 2. "Chewing Gum" Released: August 2004; 3. "Heartbeat" Released: November 2004; 4. "Happy Without You" Released: July 2005; 5. "Always Too Late" Released: September 2005

Anniemal is the debut album by Norwegian singer Annie. It was first released by 679 Recordings in September 2004. Annie began recording music in 1999 with her boyfriend, Tore Kroknes, who died in 2001. She returned to recording later that year, collaborating with Richard X, Röyksopp, and Timo Kaukolampi.

The album combines Annie's thin, airy vocals with heavily layered beats. It is heavily influenced by 1984 dance-pop. Upon release, the album was successful in Norway. Blogs leaked tracks from Anniemal before it was released internationally, and publications from other countries soon praised the album for its blissful but melancholic sound.

Before releasing the album internationally in 2005, Annie's record label 679 Recordings was not confident in the album's ability to achieve commercial success overseas, so it did not heavily promote Anniemal. The album eventually sold over 100,000 copies worldwide. It yielded four singles: "Chewing Gum", "Heartbeat", "Happy Without You", and "Always Too Late".

== Background and development ==
In the late 1990s, Annie held a monthly DJ night called Pop Till You Drop with friend Frøken Blytt in her hometown of Bergen, Norway. There she met producer Tore Kroknes, and the two began dating. Annie and Kroknes borrowed a small studio from downtempo duo Röyksopp to record her debut single "The Greatest Hit". The song, which uses a sample of Madonna's 1982 dance-pop single "Everybody", had a limited edition release in 1999. It became an underground hit at clubs in Norway and Britain, resulting in offers for record deals. The two recorded Annie's second single, titled "I Will Get On". She focused on vocals and melodies in music, and Kroknes concentrated on production, influenced by techno, disco and house music. As she began to work on her debut album, Kroknes became ill due to a heart defect. He died eighteen months later, in April 2001. Because of their plan to make the album together, Annie struggled with the idea of collaborating with anyone else and stopped work on it entirely.

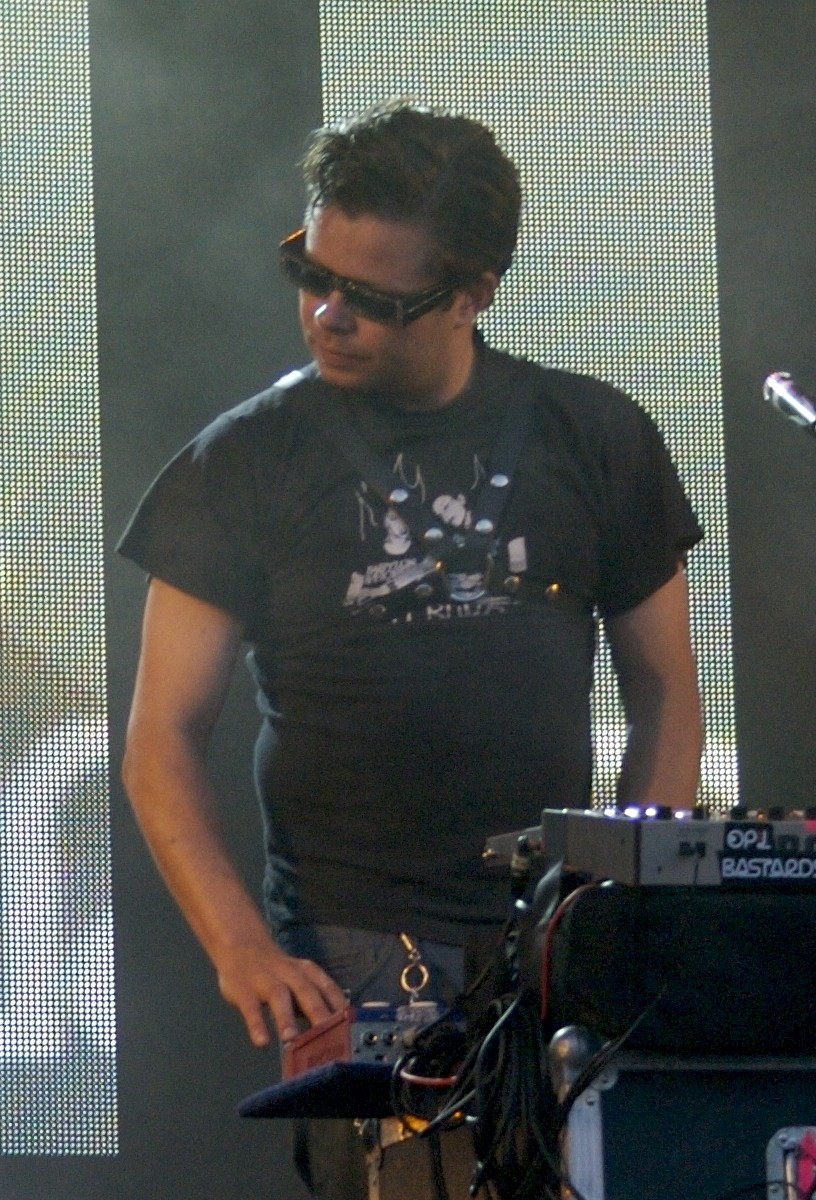
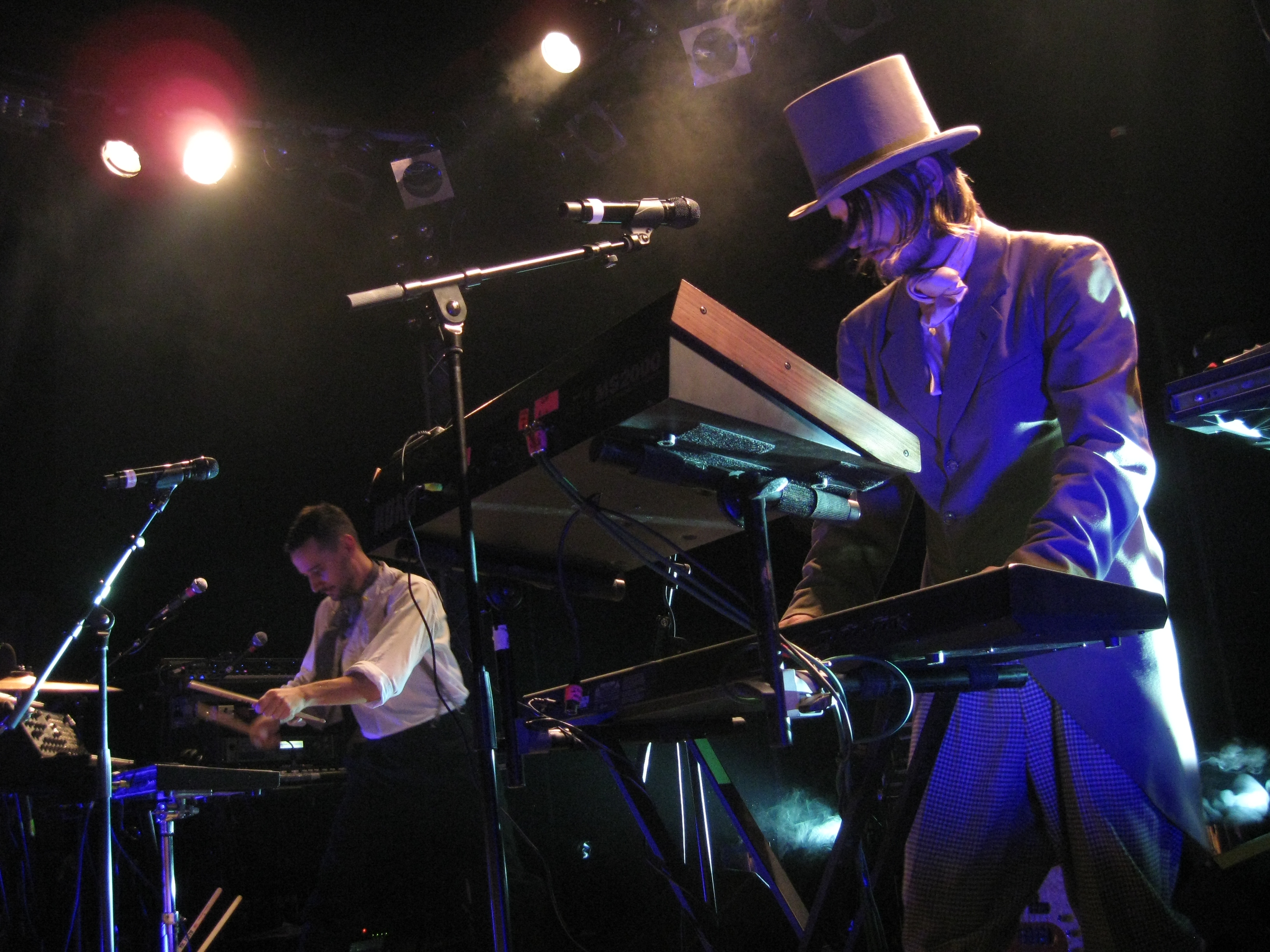
Timo Kaukolampi (left) and Röyksopp (right) wrote and produced songs for the album.

Half a year passed before Annie returned to music. She asked Timo Kaukolampi from Finnish electronic group Op:l Bastards to DJ in Bergen. Starting with a song titled "Kiss Me", he had Annie contribute vocals to some of his tracks. She asked Kaukolampi to work on the album, and he produced nine of its songs for her. She could not afford to rent a studio, so Annie recorded demos by asking to use local studios at night or borrowing one owned by her friend. In late 2003, Annie signed with 679 Recordings, and the advance enabled her to complete the record. Producer Richard X, impressed with "The Greatest Hit", asked her to record vocals for his debut album Richard X Presents His X-Factor Vol. 1. In exchange, he contributed "Chewing Gum" and "Me Plus One", both written with Hannah Robinson. Annie also worked with Röyksopp, who co-wrote and produced three songs on the album.

Rather than recording and selecting from a large number of songs, Annie stopped after around thirteen and compiled the track list. She selected the title Anniemal based on a suggestion by Kroknes. The two had planned on writing a song titled "Anniemal", so she chose it as the album's title because to her, "it just made sense. Anniemal is simple and easy and good."

== Composition ==
When working on songs, Annie was involved with the whole recording and production processes, with a focus on the melodies. Annie stated that while promoting the album, she wanted to make sure people knew of her involvement in the album's writing and production. Of its twelve songs, ten were co-written by Annie. She stated that although singing songs written by someone else might not feel less personal, "It's special to be on the stage and actually sing something you had done." With respect to her involvement in the songwriting process, Annie referred to herself as "a bit of a control freak".

The lyrics of Anniemal generally describe falling in or out of love. Annie's vocals are thin and breathy, working within a narrow vocal range. Reviewers noted a sense of melancholy in the vocals, suggesting that it could be attributed to the death of Kroknes. Annie acknowledged that none of the songs "are directly happy" and that some are "happy but still a bit melancholy." She stated that she thought bittersweet melodies "[sound] timeless…Very Scandinavian of me!" She insisted, however, that she tries to write songs that are cheerful:

"For me, it's really easy to write depressive songs and that's why I never do that. I try to do songs that are a bit happier and a bit more complicated. I think there are too many songwriters writing sad, depressive songs, and I find it really boring, listening to music where people are just complaining. People should stop whining! I find it much more challenging to make songs that are pop songs, to make happy songs, and that's why I like to do it. I really like to make quite hopeful, happy music with a little bit of melancholy in it, with a little spice of melancholy."

Anniemal focuses on heavily layered beats, with a strong 1980s influence. Annie was influenced by 1980s dance-pop, and on "No Easy Love", she includes a sample of Shakatak's 1982 song "Easier Said Than Done". Unlike many of her contemporaries, Annie avoids using an ironic or kitschy in her take on 1980s music. The songs' styles span genres including bubblegum pop, electro, disco, R&B, dance-pop, and rock. Annie's DJing experiences taught her about sound and production and affected her music. She stated that she wanted to make a pop album that would not quickly become dated, "an album that you could listen to in five years and it wouldn't sound terrible." Annie considered excluding "Greatest Hit" from Anniemal to achieve this but ultimately included it because she felt it did not sound as if it were five years old.

== Critical reception ==
Professional ratings
Aggregate scores
Source	Rating
Metacritic	81/100
Review scores
Source	Rating
AllMusic	4.5/5 stars
Blender	4/5 stars
Entertainment Weekly	B
The Independent	5/5 stars
The Irish Times	4/5 stars
Los Angeles Times	2.5/4 stars
The Observer	4/5 stars
Pitchfork	8.8/10
Rolling Stone	3.5/5 stars
Uncut	5/5 stars

Anniemal received acclaim from music critics. At Metacritic, which assigns a normalised rating out of 100 to reviews from mainstream critics, the album received an average score of 81, based on 23 reviews, which indicates "universal acclaim". Scott Plagenhoef of Pitchfork referred to the songs as a "dozen slices of stylish, sophisticated electro-pop, crisp tracks that move between the fizzy and the woozy, all anchored by Annie's breathy (sometimes almost muted) vocals." The site's endorsement was uncommon during a period when sites covering independent music were often dismissive of pop acts. In his review for AllMusic, Andy Kellman described Anniemal as "cunning" but also "deeply affecting". Dylan Hicks' review for The Village Voice stated that the blogosphere and British music press overrated Anniemal but that "an overrated good record is still a good record". Jody Rosen wrote for The New York Times that the album "is a true album, strong from top to bottom" and that "there is charm in [Annie's] deadpan delivery, and her songwriting is full of the flair for melody for which Scandinavian pop is famous." Rosen also contributed a review to Slate, where she noted that "other singers have made whole careers out of singles less winning than 'Chewing Gum,' but [Anniemal] includes several other superb songs". Kitty Empire's review in The Observer stated that the album's songs "boast a winning combination of innocence and experience, breezy blonde melodies and just-so productions". PopMatters' Pierre Hamilton called Anniemal "riveting" for how "it lacks the waxy sheen" that listeners were used to hearing in manufactured pop music. However, a second PopMatters review, written by Rob Horning, criticised the album for using a similar formula to previous generations of electropop, adding that the result was "exquisitely empty…enough to suck the feelings out of its listeners and leave them happily vacant, blank and unburdened." In his review for Billboard magazine, Michael Paoletta described the album as "slinky and sensual, cool and classy, fun and fiery" and labeled it "one of the best debut albums of 2005."

Several reviewers drew parallels between mainstream pop acts and Annie. Entertainment Weekly's Raymond Fiore called the album an "addictive" debut where Annie "flaunts whispery Kylie cool and old-school-Madonna cheekiness", but added that "this sugar rush of an album proves…candy is best consumed in moderation." Hua Hsu of Blender magazine made a similar comparison, proclaiming Annie the "Kylie Minogue hipsters don't have to feel guilty about liking". Barry Walters of Rolling Stone touted how the album "comes packed with both instant surface fizz and quirky finesse that sustains repeated listenings", and ending his review, "Goodbye, Britney. Hello, Annie."

Pitchfork listed Anniemal at number fifteen on its list of the top fifty albums of 2004, stating that its strength was how "its downtime feels so decidedly personal", and the album appeared at number 167 on Pitchfork's list of the top 200 albums of the 2000s. The album was placed on Slant Magazine's list of best albums of the 2000s at number twenty-three. Rolling Stone ranked Anniemal number thirty-nine on its "Top 50 Records of 2005" list, exclaiming, "Hail the Norse goddess."

== Release and commercial performance ==
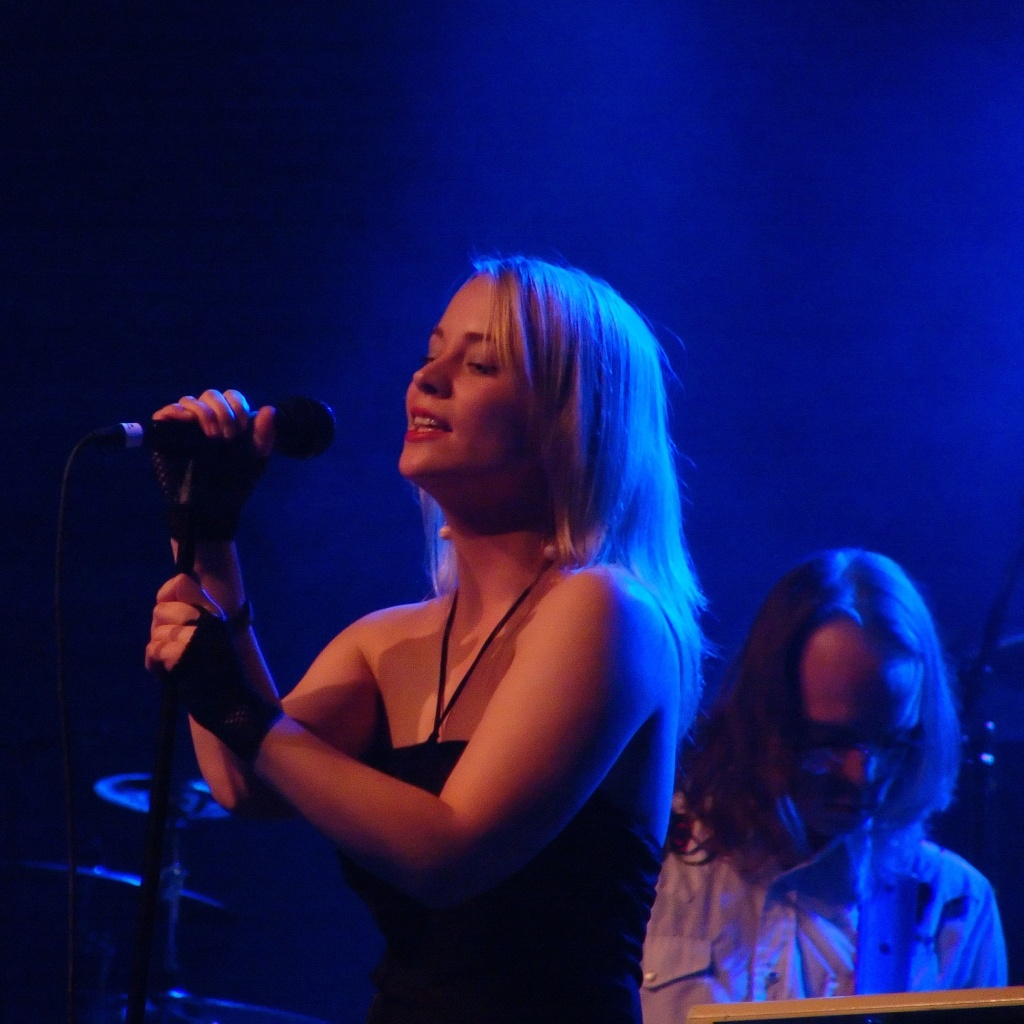
Annie performing at BIT Teatergarasjen for Bergenfest in May 2005

679 Recordings first released Anniemal in Norway on 28 September 2004. The album debuted at its peak of number six on the Norwegian Albums Chart. It won in the pop category at the 2005 Alarm Prizes, and Annie won for newcomer of the year. She again won for Newcomer of the Year at Spellemannprisen 2005, where she was invited to present an award.

Following the album's Norwegian release, the songs were leaked onto the Internet, and some appeared on year-end best-of lists in other countries. Annie stated that she had not expected North American publications to show interest in the album because she thought "the record sounds really European." The songs reached an international audience through online blogs, message boards, and file sharing networks before they had been released outside Scandinavia. This was more common for independent bands, and Annie became the first European dance-pop musician to cultivate an underground fanbase this way.

679 released the album in the rest of Europe during early 2005 but was unsure how to categorise and market Anniemal. It asked Annie about artists like Goldfrapp whose audiences 679 thought it should target. Uncertain that the album's Internet hype would significantly bolster the album's sales, the label did not heavily promote it. In support of the album, Annie opened for English alternative dance band Saint Etienne at several June 2005 gigs in the United Kingdom. Annie had never performed her songs live before the release of Anniemal, so replicating the sound of more electronic songs like "Chewing Gum" became a long process. By September of that year, the album had sold 20,000 copies.

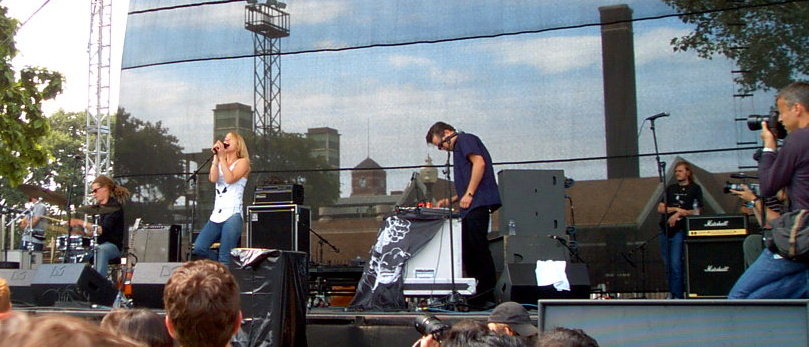
Annie performing at the Intonation Music Festival on 26 June 2005 as part of the Anniemix Tour

For its 7 June 2005 American release, Anniemal was distributed by Big Beat Records. To promote the album, Annie performed a set of DJing gigs in the United States for the Anniemix Tour during late June and early July 2005. She and Kaukolampi spun vinyl, and Annie performed her songs during the tour. Before the tour began, Anniemal was selling over one thousand copies per week in the US, and it went on to sell a total of 22 thousand copies there. Although it did not chart on the US Billboard 200, Anniemal reached number thirteen on the Top Electronic Albums chart. When released in Australia the following year, the album failed to chart on the ARIA Albums Chart but peaked at number twenty-five on the Dance Albums Chart. Anniemal sold a total of over 100,000 copies worldwide.

== Singles ==
"Chewing Gum" (2004)
The lead single, a bubblegum pop song in which gum is used as a metaphor for men.

"Chewing Gum" was released as the album's lead single in September 2004. Built around a retro beat by Richard X, the song uses chewing gum as a metaphor for men, with Annie singing "You spit it out when all the flavor has gone/Wrap him round your finger like you're playing with gum". It was the album's most commercially successful single, reaching number eight on the Norwegian Singles Chart and number twenty-five on the UK Singles Chart. It was also a critical success, listed thirty-first on the 2004 Pazz & Jop list, a survey of several hundred music critics conducted by Robert Christgau.

"Heartbeat" was the second single released from Anniemal. It narrates a night of going to clubs with friends, using a beat symbolizing a heartbeat, which doubles its tempo when Annie's persona catches the attention of her romantic interest on the dancefloor. Like "Chewing Gum", it received acclaim from music critics. It was one place behind "Chewing Gum" on the Pazz & Jop list, and Pitchfork named it the best single of 2004. However, it did not sell as well as "Chewing Gum", reaching number eighteen in Norway and fifty in the United Kingdom. "Happy Without You" and "Always Too Late" were released as the third and fourth singles in 2005, but neither charted.

== Track listing ==
No.	Title	Writer(s)	Producer(s)	Length
1.	"Intro"	Annie, Richard X, Timo Kaukolampi	X, Kaukolampi	0:54
2.	"Chewing Gum"	X, Hannah Robinson	X	3:56
3.	"Always Too Late"	Annie, Kaukolampi, Yngve Sætre	Kaukolampi, Sætre (add.)	4:16
4.	"Me Plus One"	X, Robinson	X	3:38
5.	"Heartbeat"	Annie, Svein Berge, Torbjørn Brundtland	Berge, Brundtland	3:06
6.	"Helpless Fool for Love"	Annie, Kaukolampi	Kaukolampi, Sætre (add.)	3:58
7.	"Anniemal"	Annie, Kaukolampi, Veikka Ercola	Kaukolampi, Ercola	3:35
8.	"No Easy Love"	Annie, Brundtland	Annie, Brundtland	4:02
9.	"Happy Without You"	Annie, Kaukolampi	Annie, Kaukolampi	3:16
10.	"Greatest Hit"	Annie, Erot in the Sandal	Annie, Erot, Brundtland (add.)	3:39
11.	"Come Together"	Annie, Kaukolampi	Annie, Kaukolampi	7:49
12.	"My Best Friend"	Annie, Berge, Brundtland, Kaukolampi	Annie, Berge, Brundtland, Kaukolampi	3:57

Japanese bonus tracks
No.	Title	Length
13.	"Chewing Gum" (Mylo remix)	5:53
14.	"Heartbeat" (Röyksopp's Mindre Tilgjengelige (Norwegian for "less accessible") Remix)	5:55
15.	"Heartbeat" (Phones Maximo remix)	4:16
16.	"Heartbeat" (video)

== Personnel ==
Credits adapted from Anniemal album liner notes.

- Annie – vocals (all tracks); producer (8–12); arrangement (10)
- Abdissa Assefa – percussion (6, 7, 11); drums (9, 11)
- Svein Berge – producer (5, 12); backing vocals, instruments (5)
- Torbjørn Brundtland – producer (5, 8, 12); backing vocals, instruments (5); additional producer (10)
- Veikka Ercola – mixing, producer (7)
- Erot in the Sandal – arrangement, producer (10)
- Freezer Unit – additional programming (7)
- Pete Hofmann – mixing (1–3, 6); engineer (2); additional programming (3, 6); guitar (4)
- Timo Kaukolampi – producer (1, 3, 6, 7, 9, 11, 12)
- Pekka Lahti – bass (7, 11)
- Sami Nieminen – Hammond organ (11)
- Tuomo Puranen – synthesiser (6); bass (9); synth soundscape (11)
- Jyri Riikonen – additional programming (7)
- Hannah Robinson – backing vocals (2, 4)
- Yngve Sætre – additional producer (3, 6); mixing (9, 11, 12); engineer (12)
- Fredrik Saroea – piano (11)
- Magnus Unnar – photography
- David Vogt – violin (1)
- Richard X – producer (1, 2, 4); backing vocals (4)

== Charts ==
Chart (2004–06)	Peak position
Australian Dance Albums Chart	25
Norwegian Albums (VG-lista)	6
UK Albums (OCC)	101
US Top Electronic Albums	13

== Release history ==
Region	Date	Label
Norway	28 September 2004	679 Recordings
United Kingdom	4 October 2004	679 Recordings
United Kingdom	7 March 2005	679 Recordings
United States	7 June 2005	Big Beat Records
Germany	29 August 2005	Warner Music
Japan	21 September 2005	Pony Canyon
Australia	10 March 2006	Hussle Recordings
