= Chewing Gum (song) =

2004 single by Annie

Single by Annie

from the album Anniemal
- B-side: "The Greatest Hit"; "Kiss Me"
- Released: 30 August 2004
- Genre: Electro-pop
- Length: 3:56
- Label: 679 Artists
- Songwriters: Richard X; Hannah Robinson
- Producer: Richard X

Annie singles chronology
"I Will Get On" (2002)	"Chewing Gum" (2004)	"Heartbeat" (2005)

"Chewing Gum" is a song by Norwegian singer Annie from her debut studio album, Anniemal (2004). Written by Richard X and Hannah Robinson, the song is based on a metaphor which likens men to chewing gum.

The song was released as the album's lead single on 30 August 2004. It received positive reviews from music critics. "Chewing Gum" was the album's most commercially successful single, reaching number eight on the Norwegian Singles Chart and number 25 on the UK Singles Chart.

== Background and writing ==
Producer Richard X was impressed with Annie's debut single "The Greatest Hit". He asked Annie to record vocals for his debut album Richard X Presents His X-Factor Vol. 1. In exchange, he contributed "Chewing Gum", co-written with Hannah Robinson, to Anniemal. Richard X's songwriting was inspired by a put-down that his girlfriend devised to describe self-important, vain people.

The song's lyrics compare being in a relationship with chewing gum, "chewing for fun" and then moving on to the next relationship "when all the flavor has gone." Annie compared the song's sound to the work of new wave group the Tom Tom Club. Reviewers compared "Chewing Gum" to the group's 1981 single "Genius of Love".

== Critical reception ==
"Chewing Gum" was met with critical acclaim. Pitchfork ranked the track at number 11 on its list of the "Top 50 Singles of 2004". Stylus Magazine listed it tenth on its list of the top 40 singles of 2004. The song was listed 31st on the 2004 Pazz & Jop list, a survey of several hundred music critics conducted by Robert Christgau.

== Music video ==
The music video for "Chewing Gum" was directed by Barnaby Roper. In it, two versions of Annie sing the lyrics to each other as part of a dialogue. The video includes sequences of Annie and body doubles of her dancing in a sound stage. The video was filmed in less than a day.

== Track listings ==
- UK CD1 (679L075CD1)
1. "Chewing Gum" (radio edit) – 3:30
2. "Kiss Me"
- UK CD2 (679L075CD2)
1. "Chewing Gum" (radio edit) – 3:30
2. "Chewing Gum" (Mylo remix) – 5:54
3. "Chewing Gum" (Headman vocal remix) – 6:29
4. "Chewing Gum" (Headman dub) – 6:31
5. "Chewing Gum" (video)
- UK 12-inch single (679L075T)
1. "Chewing Gum" (Mylo remix)
2. "Chewing Gum" (album version)
3. "Chewing Gum" (Headman dub)

== Personnel ==
- Annie – lead vocals
- Big Active – art direction
- Henrik Bülow – photography
- Pete Hofmann – engineering, mixing
- Hannah Robinson – backing vocals
- Richard X – production

== Charts ==
Chart (2004–2006)	Peak position
Australia (ARIA)	46
Norway (VG-lista)	8
Scotland Singles (Official Charts)	23
Sweden (Sverigetopplistan)	31
UK Singles (Official Charts)	25

== Release history ==
Region	Date	Format(s)	Label(s)	Ref.
Norway	30 August 2004	CD	679 Artists	
United Kingdom	13 September 2004	CD	679 Artists	
Australia	6 March 2006	CD	Hussle	

== In popular culture ==
The song has been featured on the online game Audition Online and an update trailer for the online game Blockland as well as in television programmes such as Glee, Skam, and Grey's Anatomy. The song was also featured in the film Big Momma's House 2.
