= Annie (singer) =

Norwegian singer, songwriter, record producer and DJ

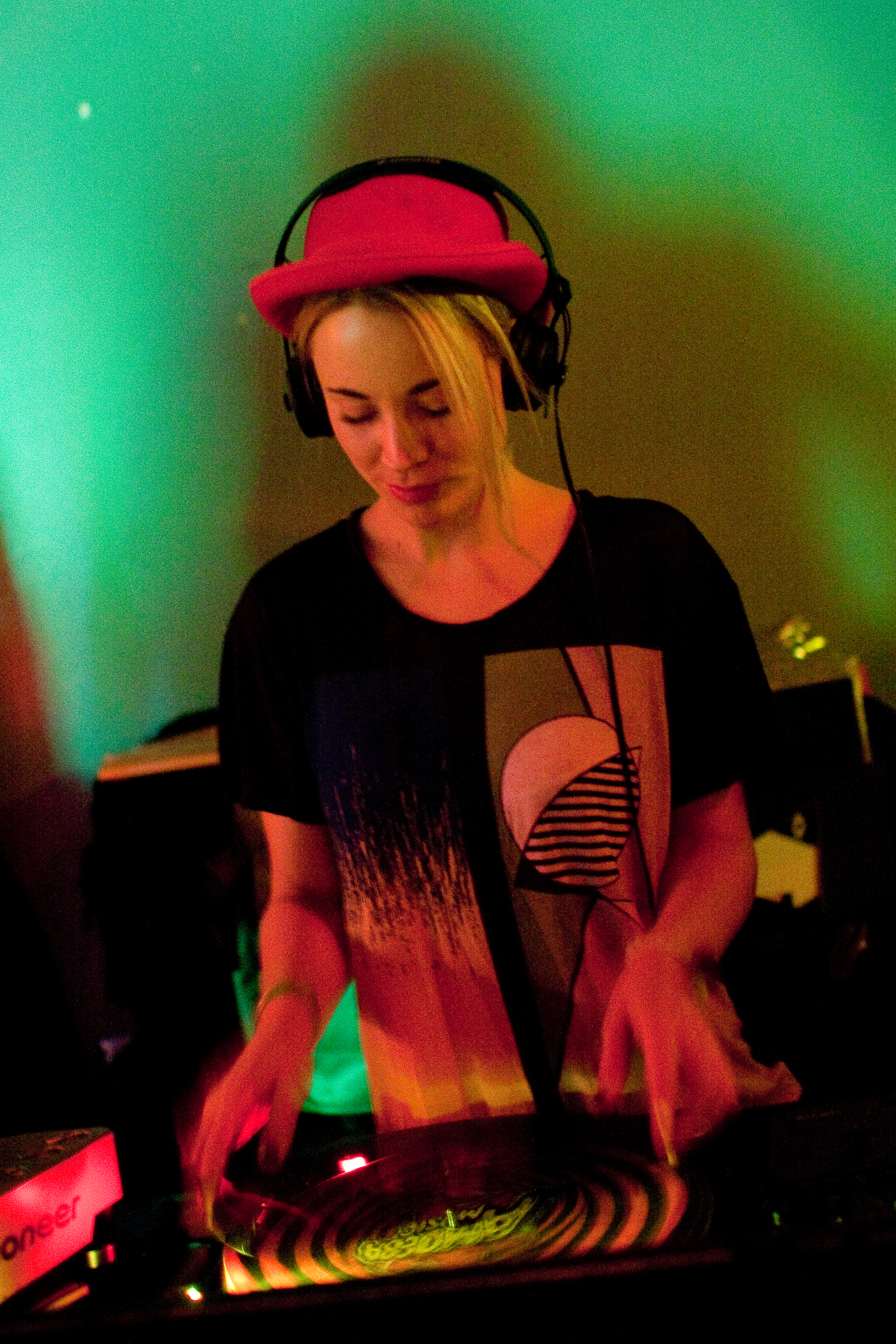
- Annie performing in 2009

Background information
- Born: Anne Lilia Berge Strand; 21 November 1977 (age 48); Trondheim, Norway
- Origin: Bergen, Norway
- Genres: Electropop; synth-pop
- Occupations: Singer; songwriter; record producer; DJ
- Years active: 1993–present
- Labels: 679; Island; Pleasure Masters; Totally; Smalltown Supersound
- Website: annieofficial.com

Anne Lilia Berge Strand (born 21 November 1977), known professionally as Annie, is a Norwegian singer, songwriter, record producer and DJ. She began her recording career in 1999 with the underground hit single "The Greatest Hit" and gained international acclaim, particularly from music bloggers, for her debut album, Anniemal (2004).

After completing secondary school, Annie started DJing in Bergen, where she met house producer and soon-to-be boyfriend Tore Kroknes. In 1999, Annie and Kroknes released the single "The Greatest Hit", which sold out in two days and became popular in Norwegian and British nightclubs. Before Annie and Kroknes could release an album, Kroknes died from a congenital heart defect in 2001. Annie went on to sign a record deal with Britain's 679 Recordings in 2003, releasing her debut album, Anniemal, in 2004, for which she received widespread critical acclaim and several Norwegian music awards. She released her second studio album, Don't Stop, on the Smalltown Supersound label in 2009. Annie lives in Berlin.

Annie has been described as "a pop singer with credibility, an indie artist with one eye on the dancefloor" and as "the Norwegian Kylie". Annie describes her music as "pop with strange edges".

In addition to her solo work, Annie has established herself as a frequent collaborator within the global electronic and house music scenes. She has appeared as a featured artist on tracks by producers such as The Toxic Avenger, Ralph Myerz, and Alan Braxe. After a decade-long interval between full-length releases, Annie issued her third studio album, Dark Hearts, in 2020.

== Early life ==
Annie was born in Trondheim, Norway, and was raised in the coastal town of Kristiansand. Annie's father, a church organist, died of cancer when Annie was 7. After a series of moves, Annie and her mother, a teacher of English and religion, moved to Norway's second largest city Bergen when Annie was 13. By this time, Annie sang in choirs.

At age 16, Annie and a group of friends formed Suitcase, an indie rock band. Suitcase only performed once, before a panel of judges for a music competition where they did not reach the finals. A few years after Suitcase's inception, Annie left the band because "the other members wanted to make trip hop."

Annie attended secondary school until around 1997, when she began to DJ around Bergen, getting acquainted with members of the Bergen music scene. During this time she met producer Mikal Tellé, owner of the Bergen-based Tellé record label, and Norwegian house producer Tore Andreas Kroknes, known professionally as DJ Erot.

== Music career ==
=== 1999–2002: "Greatest Hit" ===
Annie and Kroknes became romantically involved, and began to collaborate musically. Annie's talent for writing melodies and vocals worked well with Kroknes's production skills. Annie launched her solo singing career in 1999 with the single "Greatest Hit". The song was recorded after Annie played Madonna's song "Everybody" for Kroknes, who was experiencing a creative block at the time. Kroknes sampled the song, and Annie started to sing a melody to it. They recorded and released the song under the Tellé label. The song saw a limited release of 500 7-inch singles, which sold out in two days. "Greatest Hit" became an underground club hit in Norway and the United Kingdom, and Annie received offers for record contracts. Annie reflects that she and Kroknes had recorded the song "for fun", but with the success of the single, Annie says, "I realized that I could actually make a living out of this."

Annie and Kroknes made plans to release an album and began recording "I Will Get On" in 2000. However, Kroknes, who was born with a degenerative heart condition, fell ill near the end of 2000 and was hospitalized repeatedly. In April 2001, Kroknes died of complications from his heart condition at the age of 23. Annie told Clubbing Magazine:

"After that, I was so depressed I just wasn't able to do anything. I stayed at home, away from everyone, completely in my own world. I wanted to make the album with Tore—that was the plan. After he died I just didn't think I had the heart. But then I thought, 'Right, you're really depressed now but you have to make this album. Tore would be quite pissed off if you just stopped doing anything.'"

After a hiatus from music, Annie returned to DJing and songwriting in late 2001, running a club night called Pop Till You Drop at the Agora nightclub in Bergen with DJ friend Fröken Blytt. Among the music acts booked for Pop Till You Drop were Peaches, DJ Adam Mac, and Finnish DJ Timo Kaukolampi of Op:l Bastards. Annie later DJed at Kaukolampi's own nightclub in Helsinki and lent her vocals to some Op:l Bastards tracks.

=== 2003–2005: Anniemal ===
Annie was signed to British label 679 Recordings in March 2003. Annie recorded the track "Kiss Me" with Kaukolampi, and was approached by Richard X to record vocals for the track "Just Friends" on Richard X Presents His X-Factor Vol. 1, released in August 2003. In return, he and Hannah Robinson co-wrote "Chewing Gum" and "Me Plus One" for Annie. Annie and Richard X continued to work together, releasing the single "Chewing Gum" in Annie's name in September 2004. The track was named single of the week by NME soon after its release, and charted in the UK at number 25.

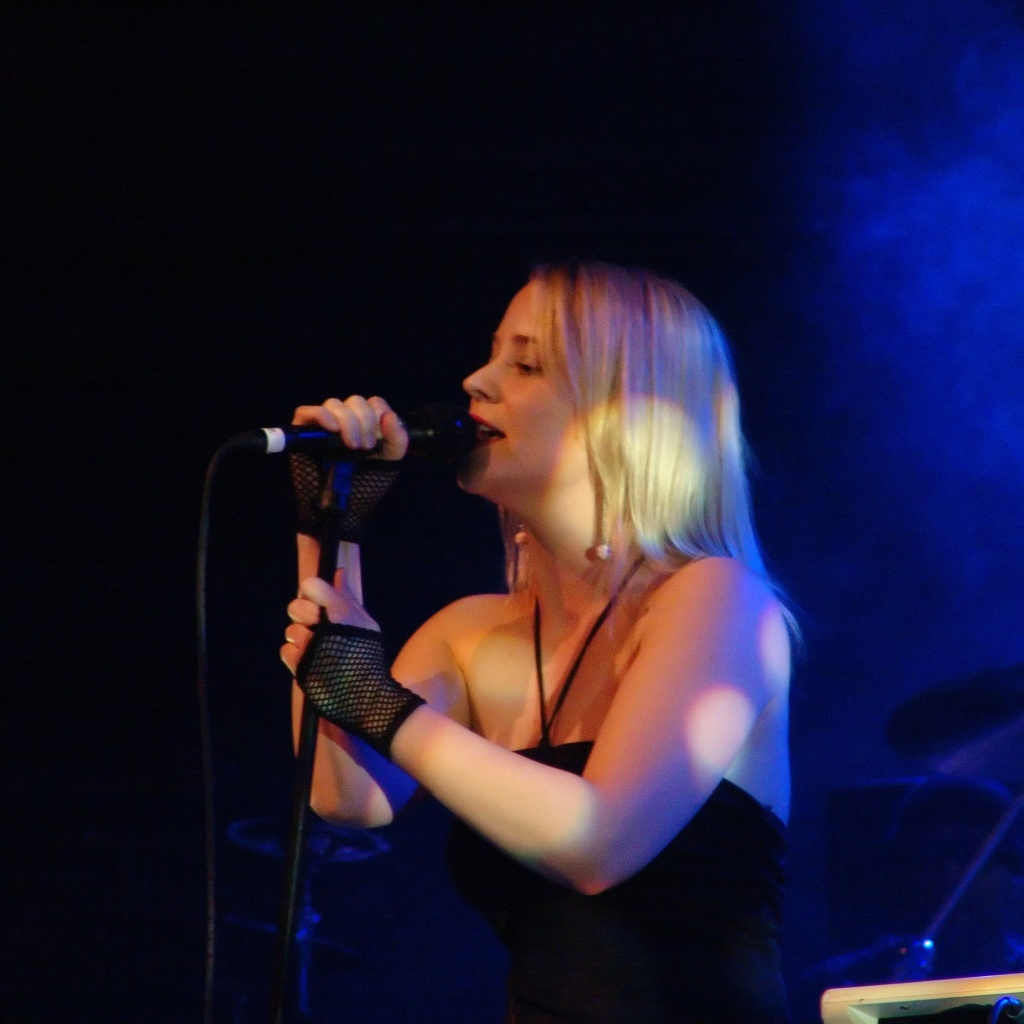
Annie performing at BIT Teatergarasjen for Bergenfest in May 2005

Later that year, Annie released her debut CD, Anniemal, collaborating with Timo Kaukolampi, Richard X, and fellow Norwegians Röyksopp. The album featured "The Greatest Hit", "Chewing Gum", and the album's second single, "Heartbeat". The song, produced by Röyksopp, was voted number one on Pitchfork's Top 50 Singles of 2004 list, before the song was officially released. "Chewing Gum" held the number-eleven spot on that same list. "Heartbeat" was remixed by Canadian electronic duo MSTRKRFT in 2005.

In 2005, Annie won several awards for her work, including Best Pop Album and Best Newcomer at the Norwegian Alarm Awards. "Chewing Gum" had also been nominated for Song of the Year. In addition, Annie won the Best Newcomer award at the prestigious Spellemannprisen. Annie's 5 February performance at the Alarm Awards was one of the first live performances of her solo career.

Annie toured around the world in 2005 to promote Anniemal, including a brief stint opening for Saint Etienne, to whom she had sent a demo tape while still in Suitcase in 1996. Annie performed at sold out club venues in the United States in 2005, and returned to the US later that year.

In 2005, Annie released a DJ mix album as part of !K7's DJ-Kicks series. Around this time, she began a record label called Totally, with Timo Kaukolampi, and planned to release a 12-inch single with Datarock. She also provided vocals for the Teddybears track "Yours to Keep" as well as the Ercola track "Follow Me", and re-recorded her songs "Chewing Gum" and "Heartbeat" in Simlish for The Sims 2: Nightlife's Danish and Norwegian versions.

=== 2006–2010: Don't Stop ===
In January 2007, Annie signed an international deal with Island Records, owned by Universal Music Group. She had planned to release her second album, Don't Stop, in September 2008, preceded by the Richard X-produced single "I Know UR Girlfriend Hates Me", after she finished touring on the Popjustice Wonky Pop Tour. In November 2008, Annie announced that due to internal problems within the label, she had decided to part ways with Island Records; in interviews following the eventual release of Don't Stop, Annie explained that her original A&R agent at the label, Nick Gatfield, left to join EMI UK, and Annie left the label because her new agent was not enthusiastic about her work. Although this left her second album's future uncertain, she retained legal control over the songs she recorded during her contracted period with the label. Verdens Gang suggested that the split with the label was precipitated by the poor chart performance of "I Know UR Girlfriend Hates Me", which charted at number 54 in the UK. Don't Stop leaked in its original incarnation in 2008.

After her departure from Island Records, Annie released a new single, "Anthonio", via producer Richard X's Pleasure Masters label in May 2009. The song tells the story of a holiday affair between Annie and the title character; Annie described the song as "the ultimate summer track".

In August 2009, Pitchfork announced that Don't Stop would be released via independent label Smalltown Supersound and Annie's own label Totally Records. It came out in the UK on 19 October 2009 and in the US on 17 November. Don't Stop includes collaborations with former collaborators Richard X and Timo Kaukolampi, as well as British producers Xenomania and Paul Epworth. The album's release was preceded by two digital singles: "Songs Remind Me of You", a Richard X production, and "My Love Is Better", which was produced by Xenomania and features guitar from Alex Kapranos of Franz Ferdinand. The latter initially featured backing vocals by British pop group Girls Aloud, but their record label intervened.

Annie co-wrote Mini Viva's debut single, "Left My Heart in Tokyo", released in September 2009 and produced by Xenomania.

=== 2010–2020: The A&R EP / Endless Vacation EP ===
In October 2010, Xenomania's News Blog reported that Annie was back in the studio recording her follow-up to 2009's "Don't Stop". Annie started recording in August 2010 with Brian Higgins at Xenomania's studios in Kent, England. She also contributed vocals to the song "Crazy for You" by New York electro duo Designer Drugs (who remixed her track "Anthonio") for their 2011 debut album Hardcore/Softcore and to "Alien Summer" by French producer The Toxic Avenger for their 2011 album Angst.

By the second half of 2011, Annie began working on The Night Within Us!, an EP that was slated for an early 2012 release. The Skatebård-produced title track and soon-to-be single "The Night Within" is the theme song for an homonymous short film by Hildegunn Waerness and part of an interdisciplinary project by Norwegian artist Bjarne Melgaard. The installation and set of paintings, exhibited on the Guido W. Baudach gallery in Berlin from 26 November 2011 to 25 February 2012, are based on the lyrics and theme of the song, which "deal with love and loss", and capture "the existential need for human tenderness, trust and partnership on one hand, and the painful realisation of lies, deceit and abandonment", all of which have been somewhat present on Melgaard's work. A video has been done for the song, based almost entirely on the exhibition.

Annie released the single "Tubestops and Lonely Hearts" on 26 April 2013. The track is a "song for the dance floor", and is "inspired by the rave scene in Bergen".

The A&R EP was released on 29 July 2013, and features the single "Back Together".

She also contributed vocals to the Finnish electronic rock band K-X-P's 2013 sophomore album, II, and featured on the track and music video for "Take A Look At The World" by Ralph Myerz in 2013, having also written the lyrics and melody.

On 7 February 2014, Annie released "Russian Kiss", a song with Bjarne Melgaard and Richard X, which condemns Russia's anti-gay laws.

On 20 and 21 August 2014, Annie was a guest member of the jury on Idol Norway.

On 16 October 2015, Annie released an EP entitled Endless Vacation.

In 2016, Annie was featured on Tuff City Kids' disco-house track "Labyrinth", the first single from their debut album Adoldesscent.

=== 2020–present: Dark Hearts and Neon Nights ===
On 19 June 2020, Annie announced her third studio album and first new LP in 11 years, Dark Hearts. Annie described the ambiance of the album as "the soundtrack to a film that doesn't exist." The first single from the album, "American Cars", was released on the same day. Dark Hearts, produced by Stefan Storm of the Swedish synth-pop duo the Sound of Arrows, was self-released through Annie's Anniemelody label on 16 October 2020. The second single from the album, "The Bomb", was released on 17 July 2020.

In July 2021, Annie announced the release of the EP Neon Nights featuring the already released titled track and a cover of the Jesus and Mary Chain's song "Just Like Honey".

In 2023, Annie worked with Alan Braxe to release a joint single, "Never Coming Back", which was included on the 2023 reissue of his compilation album The Upper Cuts. Braxe and Annie last collaborated on a 2005 remix of "Heartbeat" that appeared on the UK CD single number one and US CD maxi single, alongside other formats.

On 29 August 2024, Annie released her first trance-influenced single, "The Sky is Blue". The B-side to the 12" picture disc includes the song in Annie's native Norwegian, "Himmelen er Blå", and "The Sky is Blue (Extended Club Mix)".

== Personal life ==
Annie lives in Berlin, where she moved after being evicted from the apartment in Bergen she was living in because it was going to be turned into a hotel. She owned a cat named Joey, whom she named after both Joey Ramone and Joey McIntyre of New Kids on the Block. Joey died on 29 January 2010. Annie is an avid reader and follows global politics. She is friends with musician Peaches. Her musical influences include Madonna, Saint Etienne, the Pet Shop Boys, and Kate Bush. She has a green belt in karate.

== Discography ==
- Anniemal (2004)
- Don't Stop (2009)
- Dark Hearts (2020)

Awards
Preceded by Julian Berntzen	Recipient of the Newcomer Spellemannprisen; 2004	Succeeded by Marthe Valle
