= Richard X Presents His X-Factor Vol. 1 =

Compilation album by Richard X
- Released: 23 August 2003
- Recorded: 2001–2003
- Genres: Dance-pop; electronica; synth-pop
- Labels: EMI; Astralwerks
- Producer: Richard X

Singles from Richard X Presents His X-Factor Vol. 1
- 1. "Freak Like Me" Released: 22 April 2002; 2. "Being Nobody" Released: 2003; 3. "Finest Dreams" Released: 2003

Professional ratings
Review scores
Source	Rating
AllMusic	4.5/5 stars
Muzik	4/5 stars

Richard X Presents His X-Factor Vol. 1 is the debut compilation album by British pop producer Richard X. The album features 15 tracks all produced by Richard X, most of which feature guest vocals.

== Track listing ==
1. "Start" (Richard X)
2. "Being Nobody" (Richard X vs Liberty X)
3. "Rock Jacket" (Richard X)
4. "You Used To" (Richard X featuring Javine)
5. "Just Friends" (Richard X featuring Annie)
6. "IX" (Richard X)
7. "Lonely" (Richard X featuring Caron Wheeler)
8. "Walk on By" (Richard X featuring Deborah Evans-Strickland)
9. "Lemon/Lime" (Richard X featuring Deborah Evans-Strickland)
10. "Finest Dreams" (Richard X featuring Kelis)
11. "You (Better Let Me Love You X4) Tonight" (Richard X featuring Tiga)
12. "Mark One" (Richard X featuring Mark Goodier)
13. "Freak Like Me" (We Don't Give a Damn Mix) (Sugababes)
14. "Into U" (Richard X featuring Jarvis Cocker and Hope Sandoval) (Note: The song samples Sandoval's vocals from Mazzy Star's "Fade into You". She did not have any direct involvement in the production.)
15. "End" (Richard X)

=== Bonus tracks ===
Two bonus tracks featured on the US edition of the album released by Astralwerks.

16. "Being Nobody" (Richard X Remix)
17. "Finest Dreams" (Part 2)

== Note ==
"You Used To" was supposed to be the fourth single off the album but was cancelled. A promo single was sent out and a music video was commissioned.
