= Leckwith Stadium =

Leckwith Stadium may refer to:

- Cardiff Athletics Stadium, Cardiff; former
- Cardiff International Sports Stadium, Cardiff; current
