= Leckwith, Cardiff =

Area of Cardiff, Wales

Coordinates: 51.4720°N 3.2093°W

Leckwith: Welsh: Lecwydd
- Location within Cardiff
- Community: Canton; Grangetown
- Principal area: Cardiff
- Preserved county: South Glamorgan
- Country: Wales
- Sovereign state: United Kingdom
- Police: South Wales
- Fire: South Wales
- Ambulance: Welsh

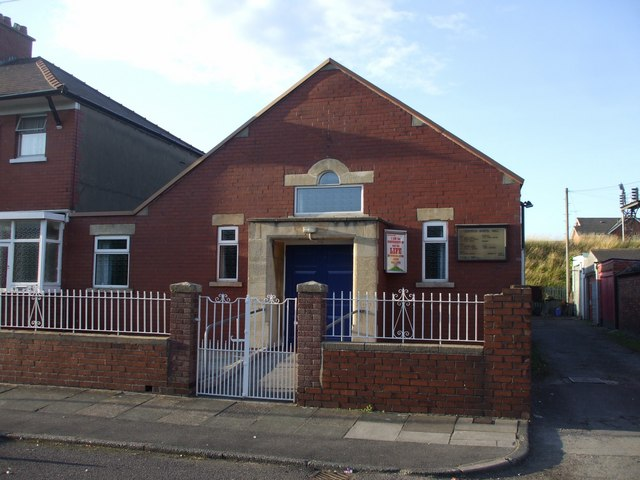
Leckwith Gospel Hall, Leckwith Avenue

Leckwith (Welsh: Lecwydd) is an area in the west of Cardiff that includes parts of the communities of Canton and Grangetown.

== Description ==
Leckwith includes the area commonly referred to as the Leckwith development. The area shares its name with the village of Leckwith which is situated on the other side of the river Ely in the Vale of Glamorgan. Historically, the parish of Leckwith included lands on both sides of the river; the low-lying marshy lands on the Cardiff side were known as the Leckwith Moors. This area is roughly equivalent to that currently bounded by the river Ely, Leckwith Road, Sloper Road, Clive Street, Ferry Road, and Cardiff Bay. But as the Cardiff Leckwith has no official status the area has no formal boundaries and the name is sometimes used for locations outside the historic parish.

== Etymology ==
The name Leckwith is an anglicisation of the Welsh Lecwydd (see Leckwith for a fuller explanation).

== Landmarks ==
The old stone triple-arched Leckwith Bridge crosses the river Ely to the west. It is Grade II* listed and dates from before 1536.

The area is also home to the Cardiff City Stadium, home of Cardiff City F.C. and also to the Cardiff International Sports Stadium as well as the Glamorgan Archives Records Office.
