= Glamorgan Building =

County building in Cardiff, Wales

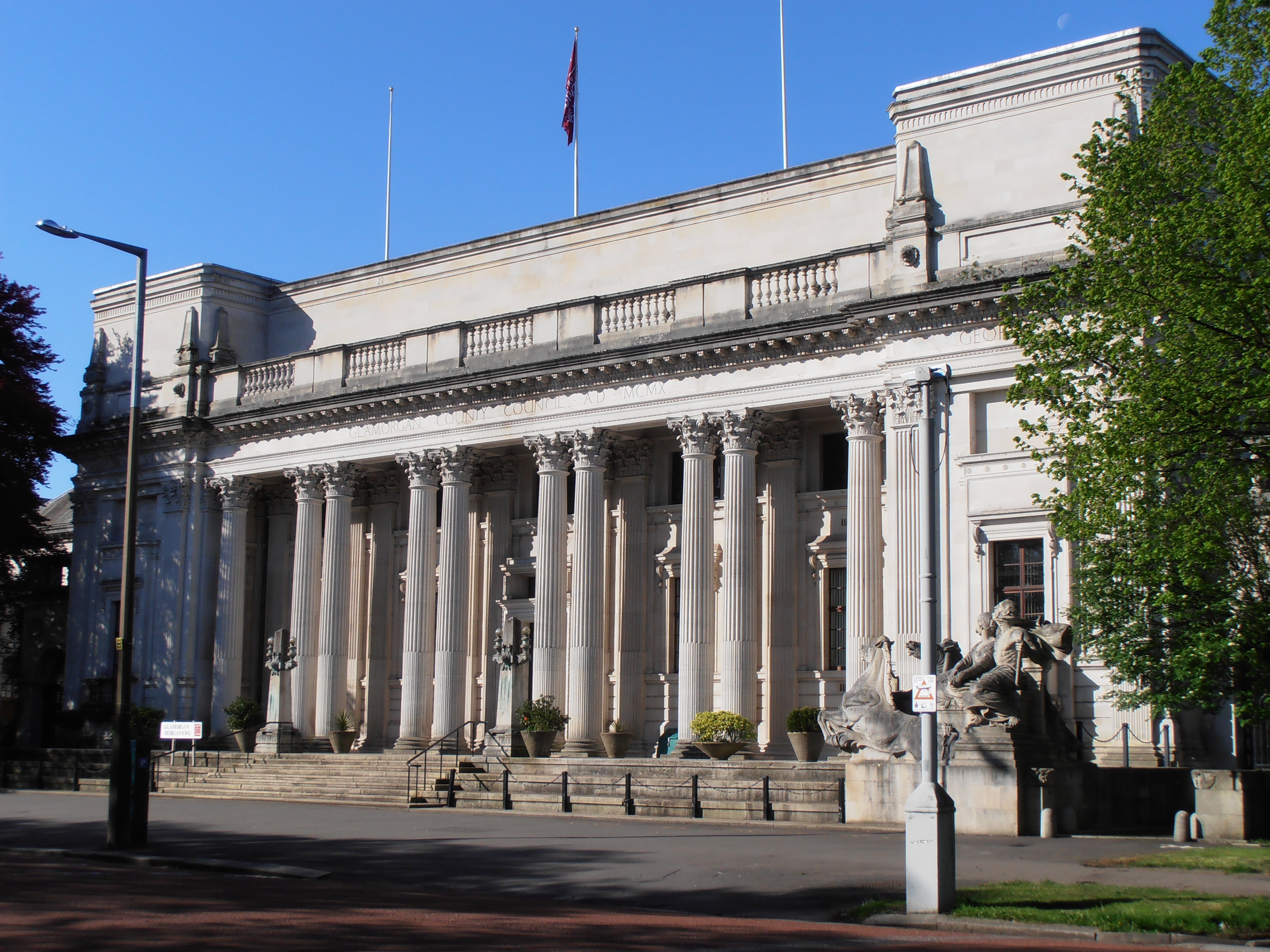
- Glamorgan Building

- Location within Cardiff
- 51.4859°N 3.1815°W
- Location: Cardiff

History
- Built: 1912

Site notes
- Architect(s): E. Vincent Harris; Thomas A. Moodie
- Architectural style: Beaux-Arts classical style

Listed Building – Grade I
- Designated: 25 January 1966
- Reference no.: 13738

The Glamorgan Building (Welsh: Adeilad Morgannwg) is a former county hall located at King Edward VII Avenue in Cathays Park, Cardiff, Wales. It was the headquarters of Glamorgan County Council from 1912 to 1974 and then of Mid Glamorgan County Council from 1974 to 1996. The building, which was acquired by Cardiff University in 1997 and is now home to the university's School of Social Sciences and the School of Geography and Planning, is a Grade I listed building.

== History ==
=== Design and construction ===
Following the implementation of the Local Government Act 1888, which established county councils in every county, it became necessary to find a meeting place for Glamorgan County Council. Initially the county council used offices in Westgate Street and St Mary Street. After finding this arrangement inadequate, county leaders decided to procure a purpose-built facility: the site they selected at Cathays Park was acquired from the Marquess of Bute in 1898.

Construction of the new building started in 1909. It was designed by Vincent Harris and Thomas Anderson Moodie in the Beaux-Arts classical style following a design competition and was built by Turner & Sons of Cardiff at a cost of £67,724. It was officially opened by the Chairman of the County Council, J. Blandy Jenkins, as Glamorgan County Hall on 19 September 1912. The design involved a symmetrical main frontage of seven bays facing King Edward VII Avenue; the central section of five bays featured a large portico with a deeply recessed entrance flanked by a series of paired Corinthian order columns. Internally, the principal room was the council chamber.

Serving as reminders of Glamorgan's source of wealth, two groups of statues by Albert Hodge, one representing navigation and the other coal mining, were unveiled outside the building.

Statues outside the Glamorgan Building

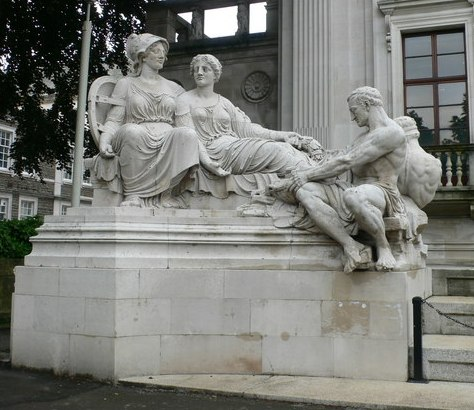
Minerva, representing mining

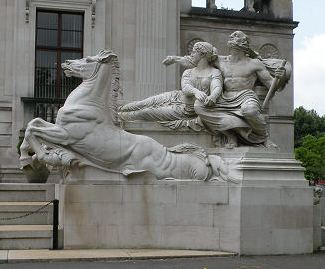
Neptune in a chariot, representing navigation

With the Local Government Act 1929, which transferred more powers to local authorities, a large extension was required. It was built to the south west of the main building to a design by Ivor Jones and Percy Thomas at a cost of £54,054 and opened on 22 September 1932.

=== Recent history ===
Following the implementation of the Local Government Act 1972, which broke up Glamorgan County Council and established Mid Glamorgan County Council, the new county council took over the building.

On 1 April 1996, under the Local Government (Wales) Act 1994, Mid Glamorgan County Council was abolished and the building was acquired by Cardiff University in 1997 and became home to the university's School of Social Sciences and the School of Geography and Planning. The Glamorgan Record Office, which had been based in the building since 1939, relocated to a purpose-built office in Leckwith next to the Cardiff City football stadium as Glamorgan Archives in 2009.
