= Cardiff Athletics Stadium =

Former stadium in Cardiff, Wales

- Leckwith Athletics Stadium
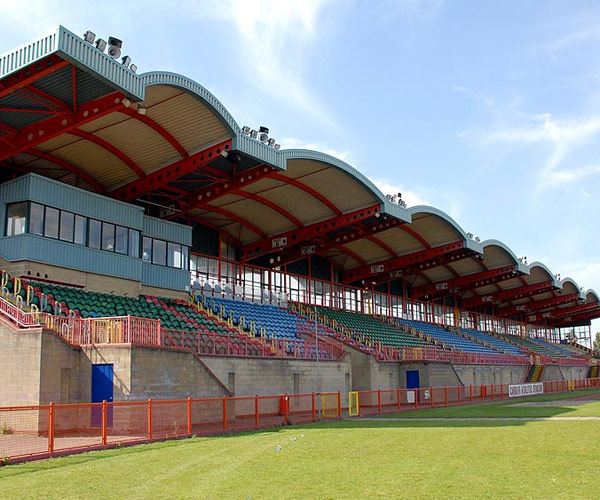
- Interactive map of Cardiff Athletics Stadium
- Location: Leckwith, Cardiff, Wales
- Coordinates: 51°28′22″N 3°12′11″W
- Owner: Cardiff Council
- Operator: Cardiff Council
- Capacity: 2,613
- Surface: Synthetic

Construction
- Built: 1989
- Opened: 3 August 1989; 3 June 1990 (Official)
- Closed: 2 November 2007
- Demolished: November 2007
- Cost: £5.5 million
- Main contractor: Kier Western Ltd

The Cardiff Athletics Stadium (also known as Leckwith Athletics Stadium) was an athletics and football stadium in Cardiff, Wales. It opened in 1989 and was demolished in 2007, replaced by the Cardiff International Sports Stadium.

The stadium was used by Inter Cardiff of the League of Wales and Cardiff Grange Quins of the Welsh Football League and the Cardiff City F.C. reserve and ladies teams used the available facilities. The athletics track had a synthetic surface measuring 400 metres with 8 circular lanes and 10 straight lanes. It had been open to the public, seating 2,613 (covered) with changing rooms and all-weather floodlights.

== History ==
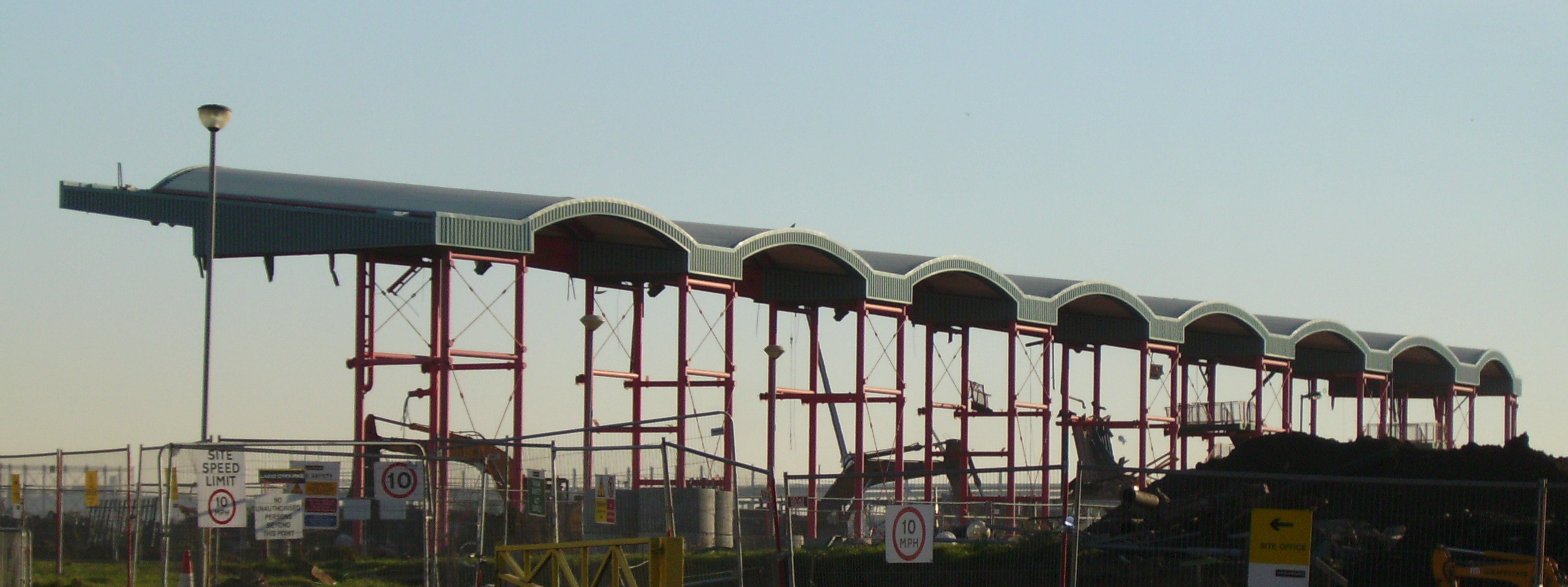
During final stages of demolition of the Cardiff Athletics Stadium

The stadium was opened in 1989. When it was built, the £5.5m stadium was considered to be suitable for the 1994 Commonwealth Games if Cardiff had hosted it.

The athletes to have competed at the stadium included Linford Christie, Colin Jackson, and Jamie Baulch.

The stadium has now been demolished to make way for the Cardiff City Stadium, which is part of the Leckwith development and also retail units as part of the development. A new athletics facility has been built just across the Leckwith Road about 100 metres away as part of the same development, it is known as the Cardiff International Sports Stadium.

== See also ==
- Sport in Cardiff
