= Sweet Sour (song) =

Single by Band of Skulls

from the album Sweet Sour
- Released: January 2012
- Recorded: 2011
- Genre: Garage rock, blues rock, hard rock, alternative rock
- Length: 3:20
- Label: Electric Blues Recordings, Vagrant Records
- Songwriter: Band of Skulls

"Sweet Sour" is a song by English rock band Band of Skulls, from their 2012 album of the same name. Written by the band and released as a single just prior to the album's release, it reached number 29 on the US Alternative Songs Chart.

== Reception ==
In a favorable review of the album, Paste magazine's Ryan Reed described the song "head-crushing" with a "sludgey, Sabbath-esque hammer-on riff."

Chris Schulz of the New Zealand Herald said that the song was passionate and energetic, playing to the band's strengths, and called it "slow-burning but blistering."

In February 2012, "Sweet Sour" was chosen as the iTunes Single of the Week concurrently with the album's iTunes release.

In 2012, Bands of Skulls performed the song on BBC Radio 1's Live Lounge and the Late Show with David Letterman.

In 2013, the song won an Independent Music Award for Best Rock/Hard Rock Song.

== Music video ==
A music video for "Sweet Sour" was released in early 2012. Entirely in black and white, it features a boy, who kicks a boombox at the beginning of the video and is later shown dancing, lifting weights, and boxing in a blighted urban environment.
