= Sweet Sour =

Studio album by Band of Skulls
- Released: 20 February 2012
- Recorded: Rockfield Studios, Wales
- Genres: Alternative rock; blues rock; garage rock; hard rock
- Length: 38:41
- Labels: Electric Blues Recordings/PIAS (UK); Vagrant (US)
- Producer: Ian Davenport

Band of Skulls chronology
Baby Darling Doll Face Honey (2009)	Sweet Sour (2012)	Himalayan (2014)

Singles from Sweet Sour
- 1. "Sweet Sour" Released: 6 December 2011; 2. "The Devil Takes Care of His Own" Released: 20 July 2012

Professional ratings
Aggregate scores
Source	Rating
Metacritic	69/100
Review scores
Source	Rating
AllMusic	3.5/5 stars
The Aquarian Weekly	(Refined)
Classic Rock	7/10 stars
Consequence of Sound	C+
NME	6/10
Paste	7.9/10
PopMatters	8/10
Rolling Stone	3/5 stars

Sweet Sour is the second album by English rock band Band of Skulls. It was released on 20 February 2012 in England and 21 February 2012 in the United States.

Ian Davenport returned to produce the album after working with the band on their debut. The album was recorded at Rockfield Studios in Wales.

== Track listing ==
No.	Title	Length
1.	"Sweet Sour"	3:23
2.	"Bruises"	3:51
3.	"Wanderluster"	3:50
4.	"The Devil Takes Care of His Own"	3:04
5.	"Lay My Head Down"	5:29
6.	"You're Not Pretty but You Got It Goin' On"	3:04
7.	"Navigate"	5:40
8.	"Hometowns"	3:21
9.	"Lies"	2:27
10.	"Close to Nowhere"	4:32

iTunes Bonus Track Version
No.	Title	Length
11.	"Such a Fool"	3:15

== Personnel ==
- Russell Marsden – vocals, guitar
- Emma Richardson – bass guitar, vocals
- Matt Hayward – drums

== Charts ==
Chart performance for Sweet Sour
Chart (2012)	PeaK position
Australian Albums (ARIA)	35
Belgian Albums (Ultratop Flanders)	51
Dutch Albums (Album Top 100)	60
French Albums (SNEP)	165
Irish Albums (IRMA)	53
UK Albums (Official Charts)	14
US Billboard 200	138
