= Love Is All You Love =

Studio album by Band of Skulls
- Released: 12 April 2019
- Studio: Miloco Studios London, England; Southampton, England Studio; The Smoakstack Nashville, US
- Genre: Garage rock; pop rock
- Length: 36:00
- Label: SO; Silva Screen
- Producer: Richard X

Band of Skulls chronology
By Default (2016)	Love Is All You Love (2019)

Singles from Love Is All You Love
- 1. "Cool Your Battles" Released: 22 January 2019; 2. "We're Alive" Released: 8 March 2019; 3. "Love Is All You Love" Released: 9 April 2019

Love Is All You Love is the fifth studio album by the British rock band Band of Skulls, released on 12 April 2019 by SO Recordings and Silva Screen Records. It was produced by Richard X and is the band's first album without drummer Matt Hayward, who left in 2017. It was supported by the singles "Cool Your Battles" and "We're Alive".

== Background ==
The band called the album "an anti-war cry for our turbulent times", and said they wanted to avoid making a "depressing record, because we don't think anyone wants to hear a dark, depressing record about these times. We wanted to have that feeling of euphoria in song, because we weren't getting it anywhere else." They instead decided to take a more electronic approach, enlisting the producer Richard X after spending most of 2017 writing the album. Emma Richardson said that because the band had lost its drummer after Hayward left, they "started to experiment with electric drums and acoustic drums". Richard X helped the band to experiment with a mix of live and electronic elements to achieve a "rock and roll element with a dance beat".

== Track listing ==
No.	Title	Length
1.	"Carnivorous"	3:49
2.	"That's My Trouble"	2:58
3.	"Love Is All You Love"	3:22
4.	"Not the Kind of Nothing I Know"	3:08
5.	"Cool Your Battles"	3:22
6.	"Sound of You"	4:48
7.	"Thanks a Lot"	3:56
8.	"We're Alive"	3:35
9.	"Speed of Light"	3:23
10.	"Gold"	4:00

== Charts ==
Chart (2019)	Peak position
Scottish Albums (OCC)	15
UK Albums (OCC)	30
