= Himalayan (album) =

Studio album by Band of Skulls
- Released: 31 March 2014
- Genre: Blues rock; hard rock
- Length: 47:16
- Label: Electric Blues
- Producer: Nick Launay

Band of Skulls chronology
| Sweet Sour (2012) | Himalayan (2014) | By Default (2016) |

Professional ratings
Aggregate scores
| Source | Rating |
|---|---|
| Metacritic | 70/100 |
Review scores
| Source | Rating |
| AllMusic | 3/5 stars |
| Classic Rock | 7/10 |
| NME | 8/10 |

Himalayan is the third studio album by the British rock band Band of Skulls, released on 31 March 2014 through Electric Blues Records.

== Track listing ==
| No. | Title | Length |
|---|---|---|
| 1. | "Asleep at the Wheel" | 4:06 |
| 2. | "Himalayan" | 3:13 |
| 3. | "Hoochie Coochie" | 2:37 |
| 4. | "Cold Sweat" | 4:37 |
| 5. | "Nightmares" | 4:11 |
| 6. | "Brothers and Sisters" | 3:05 |
| 7. | "I Guess I Know You Fairly Well" | 3:35 |
| 8. | "You Are All That I Am Not" | 4:52 |
| 9. | "I Feel Like Ten Men, Nine Dead and One Dying" | 4:08 |
| 10. | "Toreador" | 3:59 |
| 11. | "Heaven's Key" | 4:49 |
| 12. | "Get Yourself Together" | 3:54 |

iTunes bonus track version
| No. | Title | Length |
|---|---|---|
| 13. | "Be Mine" | 2:41 |

== Personnel ==
- Russel Marsden – vocals, guitar
- Emma Richardson – bass guitar, vocals
- Matt Hayward – drums
- Nick Launay – producer, engineer, mixing
- Adam Greenspan – engineer
- Bernie Grundman – mastering

== Charts ==
Chart performance for Himalayan
| Chart (2014) | PeaK position |
|---|---|
| Australian Albums (ARIA) | 24 |
| Belgian Albums (Ultratop Flanders) | 44 |
| Belgian Albums (Ultratop Wallonia) | 94 |
| Dutch Albums (Album Top 100) | 84 |
| Swiss Albums (Schweizer Hitparade) | 94 |
| UK Albums (OCC) | 21 |
| US Billboard 200 | 55 |
