= Leckwith development =

Public works project in Cardiff

Coordinates: 51.464°N 3.199°W

The Leckwith development is in the Leckwith area of southwest Cardiff, Wales. Work started in Autumn 2007 with the construction of a new stadium for Cardiff City F.C.

== The proposal ==
The project consisted of:

- A new 26,828-seat stadium for Cardiff City F.C.
- A 470,000 sq ft (44,000 m^{2}) retail park with 18 retail units
- A New athletics stadium to replace the recently demolished Cardiff Athletics Stadium
- A new housing estate on the site of the current Ninian Park Stadium
- A 70-room hotel with bar and restaurant
- A new Glamorgan Archives to house archives from the historic county of Glamorgan and worldwide genealogical resources.

Completion of the development was planned for Spring 2010.

=== Three way land-swap ===
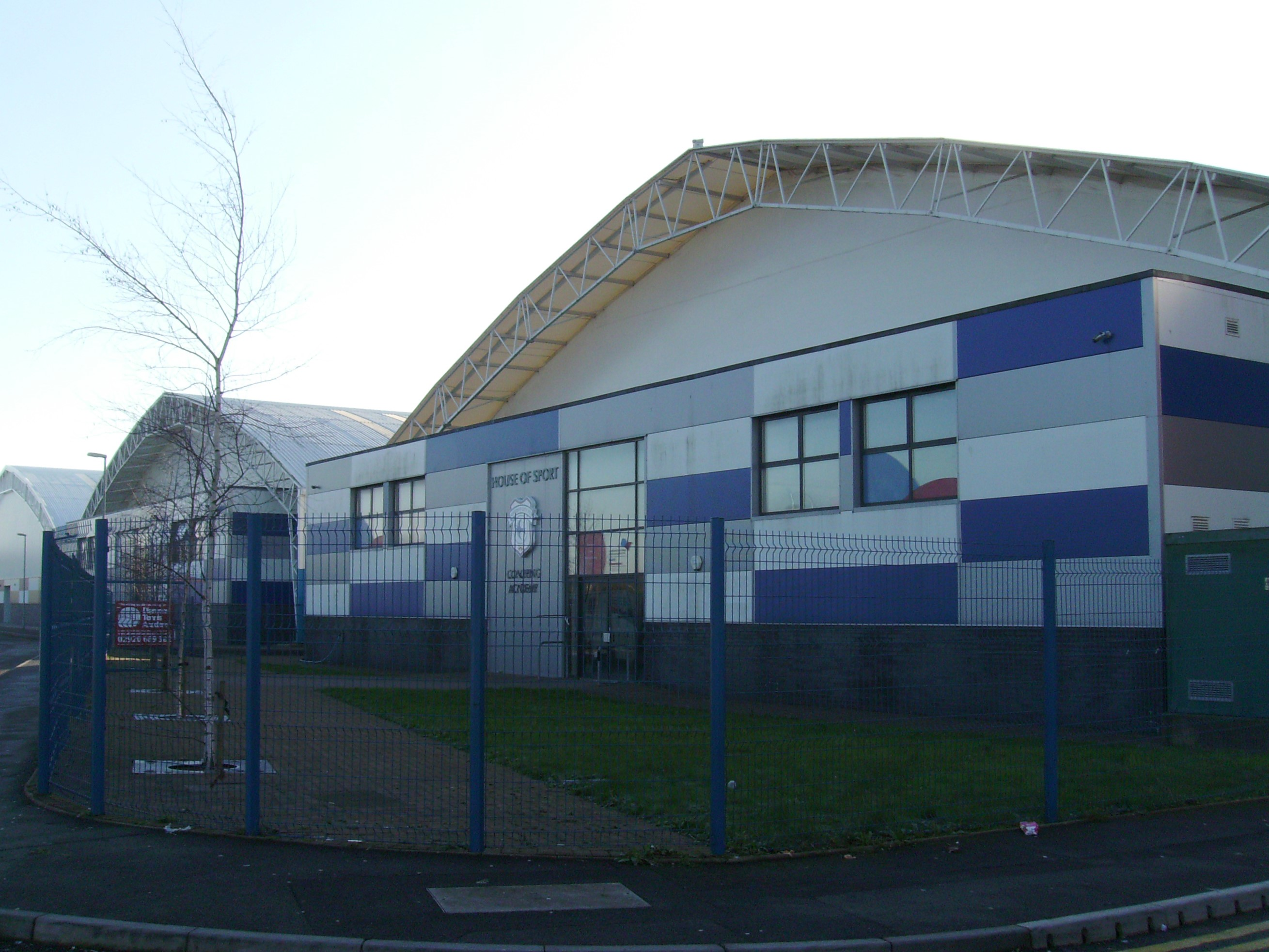
House of Sport

To complete the deal, it involved a simple land-swap arrangement of existing facilities across three sites:

- Cardiff Council gave a nominal 125year lease to Cardiff City on a 40acre block of land, on which the former Cardiff Athletics Stadium stood
- Cardiff City agreed to build a new athletics stadium on a further 20acre council owned plot north of the existing site
- On completion of the new athletics stadium, Cardiff City gained the 125-year rent-free lease. On half of the land they developed the new Cardiff City stadium and retail park
- The residual 20acres would be used for development of the new Glamorgan Record Office (at the cost of the council), a hotel (build by the football club, which they could lease off) and the community sports facility House of Sport (built at the cost of football club, run by the council). If the football club failed to complete House of Sport development by December 2009, then the lease on the hotel would forfeit to the council
- The football club, once they had moved stadium, could sell the land of the former Ninian Park stadium for housing redevelopment

Unfortunately, due to unforeseen issues in construction across the two council owned sites, the football club incurred additional costs. This initially resulted in an agreement to lapse the development of the House of Sport until December 2010. In January 2009, with Cardiff City facing a winding-up order due to an outstanding £2.7M bill to HMRC, the club asked the council for permission to sell the residual 20acres to a developer.

== Capital Shopping Park ==
The Capital Shopping Park in Leckwith, started building at the end of 2007 and originated from the idea of a new stadium for Cardiff City FC. The retail development was completed in 2009 and has a total of 21 tenants including Costco, Asda, ScS, Next, Hobbycraft, Smyths Toys and Costa. It has 13,935-square-metre (150,000 sq ft) of retail space. It was originally owned by Capital Retail Park Partnership, which is owned by commercial developer PMG, but in February 2014 it was sold to Aberdeen Asset Management for £59.65 million.

Matalan were named in an original planning application, but pulled out in March 2005.

Capital Retail Park

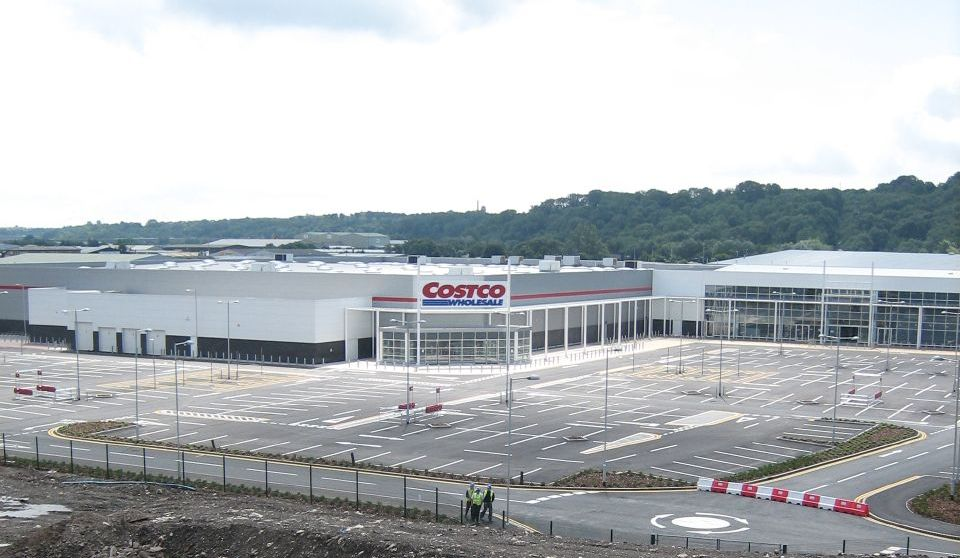
The Capital Retail Park during construction

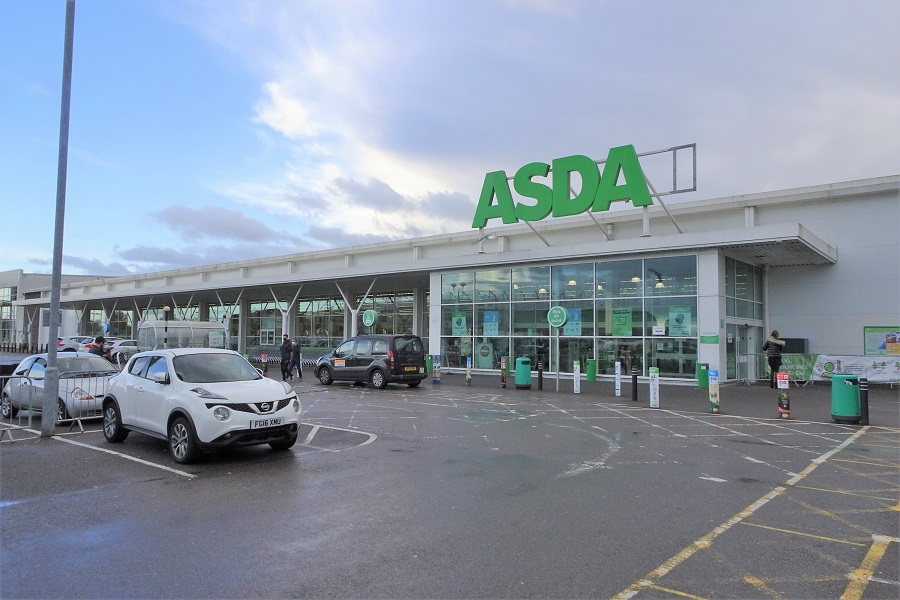
Asda supermarket

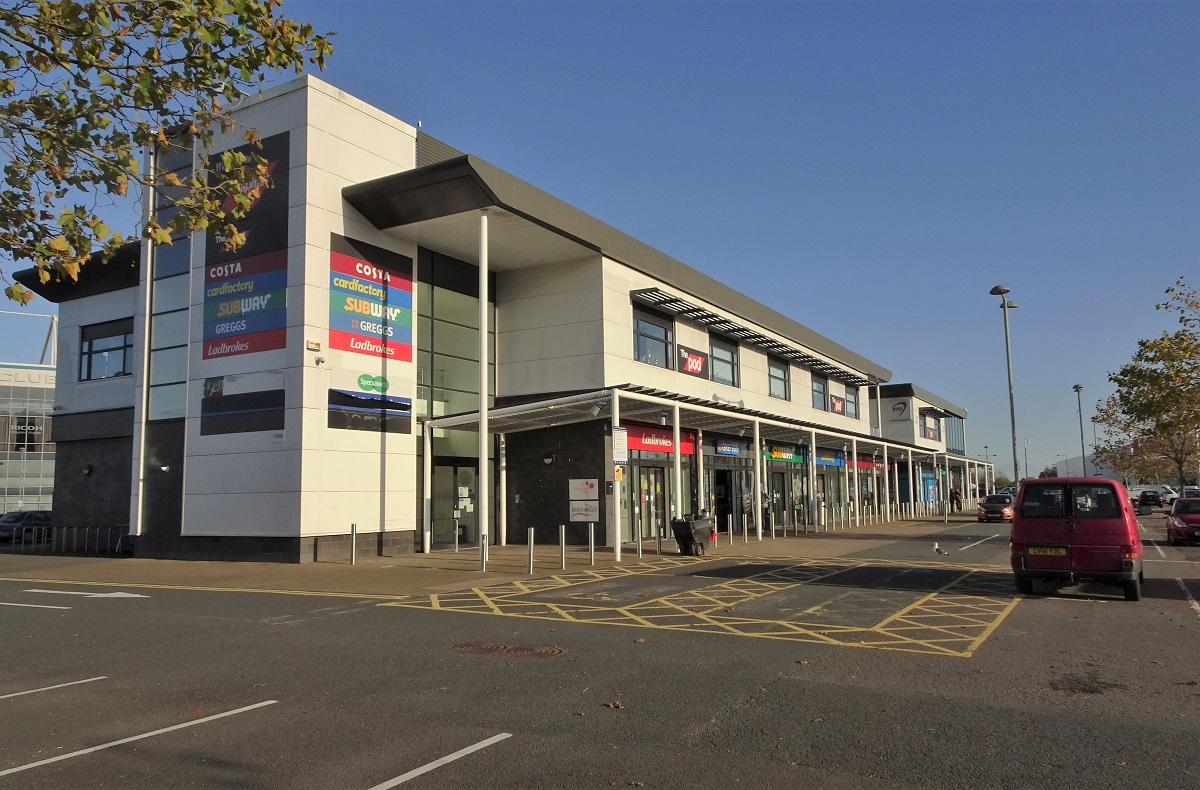
The Pod

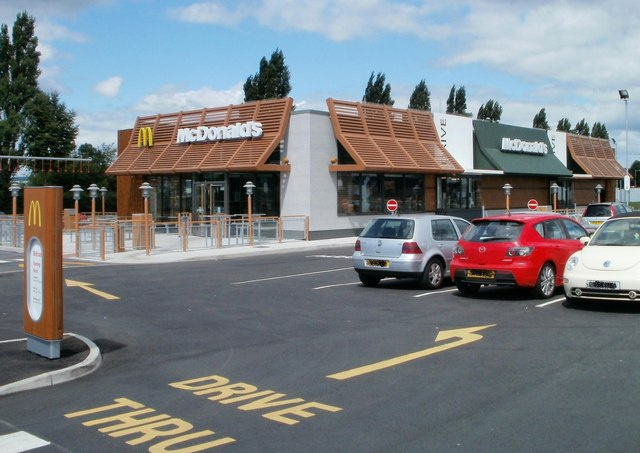
McDonald's restaurant

== Cardiff City Stadium ==
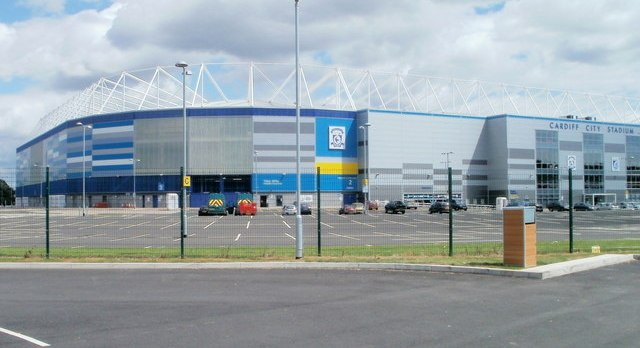
Canton End (left) and Grandstand of Cardiff City Stadium

The new stadium has 33,280 seats and is home to Cardiff City F.C. club. The stadium also hosted the home matches of the Cardiff Blues rugby union team until the 2011–12 season. It is the second largest stadium in Cardiff and also Wales (the largest being the Millennium Stadium). The stadium cost £29,000,000, Laing O'Rourke was contracted for the whole development.

== Cardiff International Sports Stadium ==
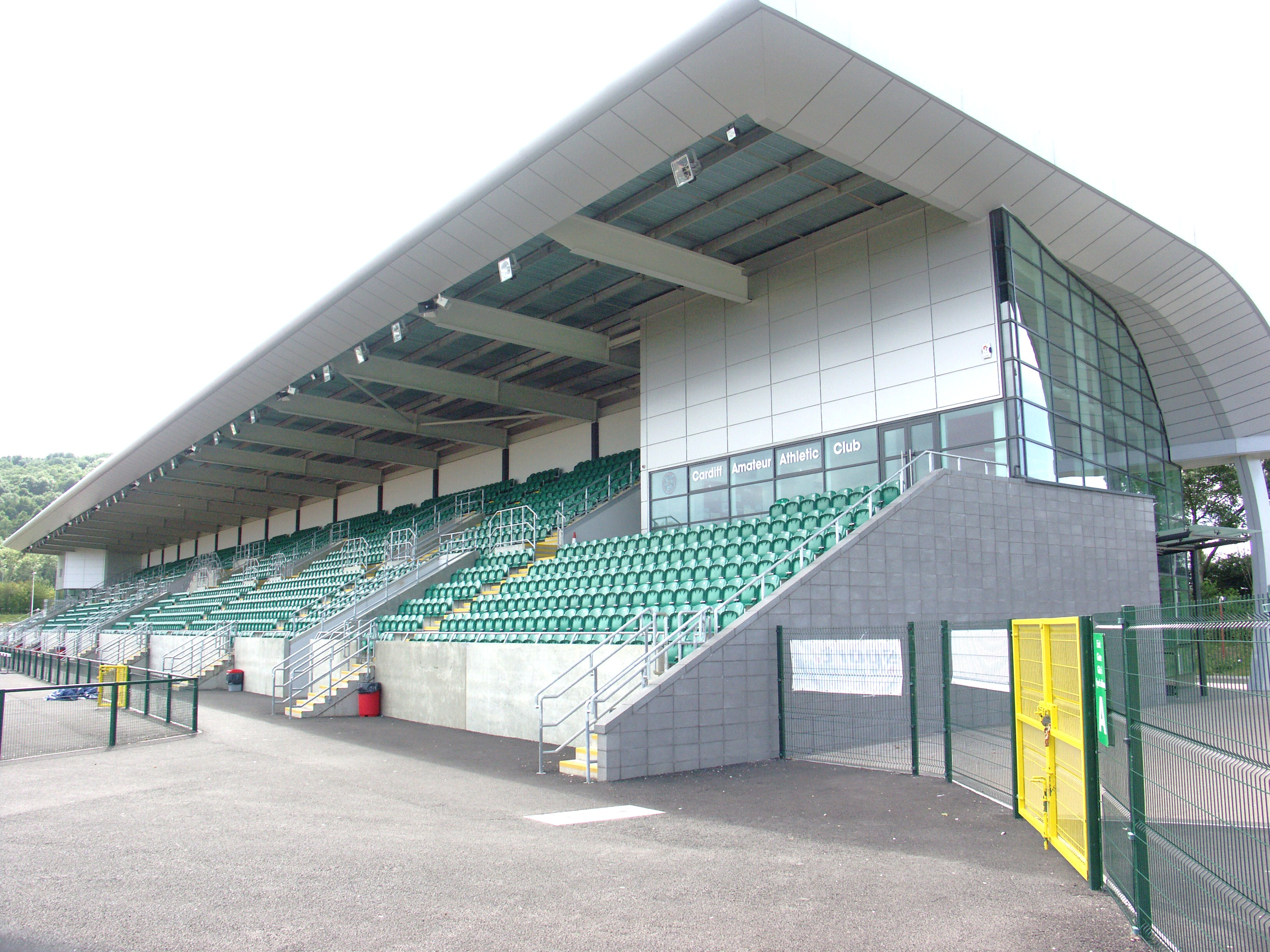
The main stand of Cardiff International Sports Stadium

The new athletics stadium, built to replace the previous Cardiff Athletics Stadium which was demolished to make room for the new rugby and football stadium. Construction started in March 2007. The athletics stadium is the only part of the development to not be built by the main contractor, Laing O'Rourke and instead individual contractor, Cowlin Construction. The stadium will include a gym, meeting rooms, and several offices, which should be completed in the new year. Members of the public are now permitted to come and watch the events that are taking place on the track or field in the now completed stand. The track and field are now open for public use.

== Glamorgan Record Office/Glamorgan Archives ==
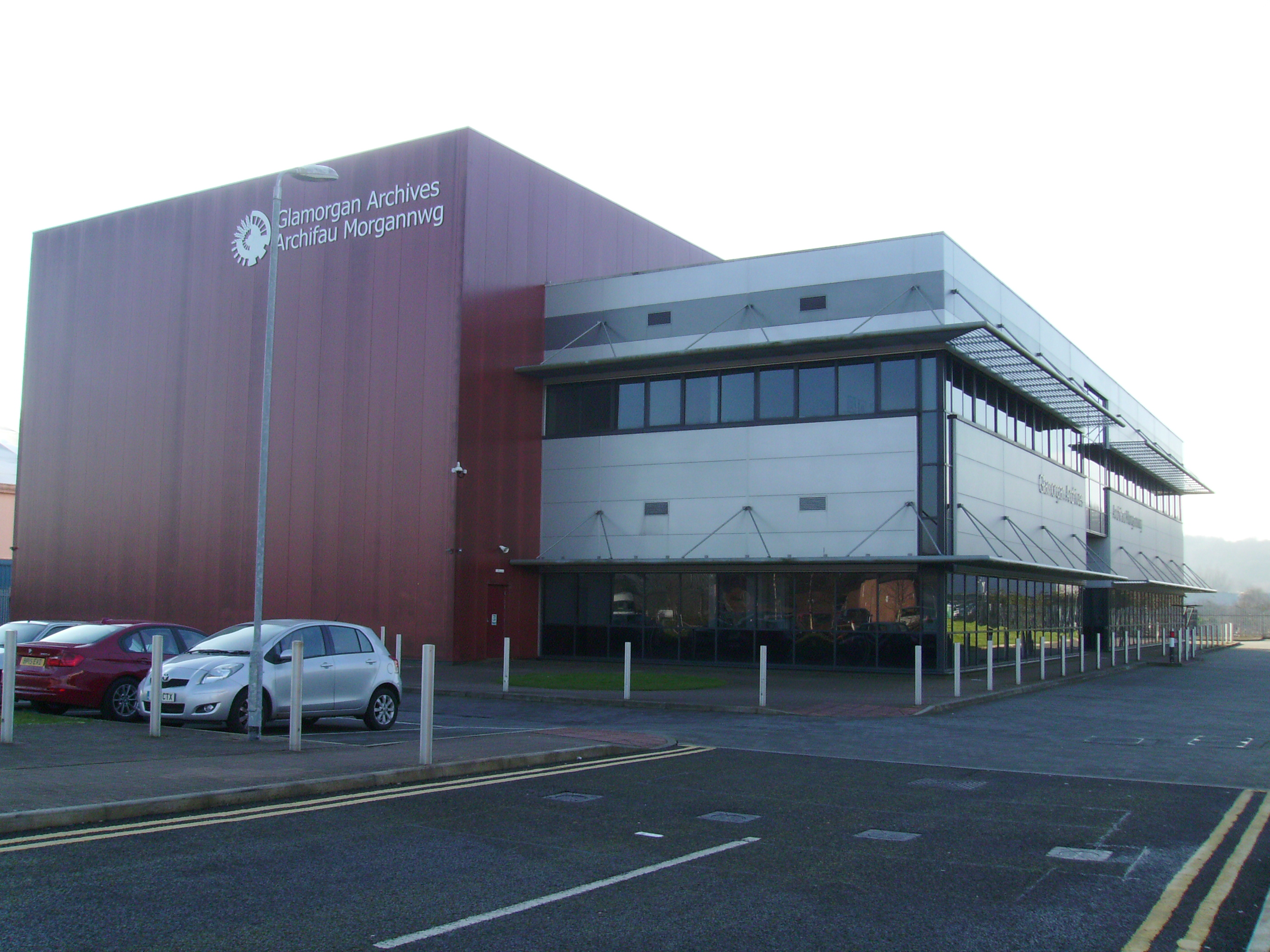
Glamorgan Archives building

The Glamorgan Record Office moved to a site behind the new football stadium from the Glamorgan Building in Cathays Park at the end of 2009. The newly renamed Glamorgan Archives offers facilities for visitors to search its 8.5 km of archives relating to the historic county of Glamorgan, as well as conference space for workshops, lectures and school groups, and a modern paper conservation studio.

== Leckwith and Droves allotments and city farm ==
The retail park now rests on the site previously occupied by Cardiff's city farm. Cardiff Council originally planned for the retail park to be built on the current site of the allotments, located on Bessemer Road.

Some of the unused plots at the entrance to the allotments were planned to become the site for a new community centre for disabled children and people with learning disabilities, run by Cardiff-based charity, Vision 21. This development was accepted by Cardiff Council on 20 October 2008, in their development control announcements. This site was to include a café, garden centre, a small shop, offices and meeting rooms.

== Ninian Park housing estate ==
Demolition of Ninian Park stadium and construction of Ninian Park housing

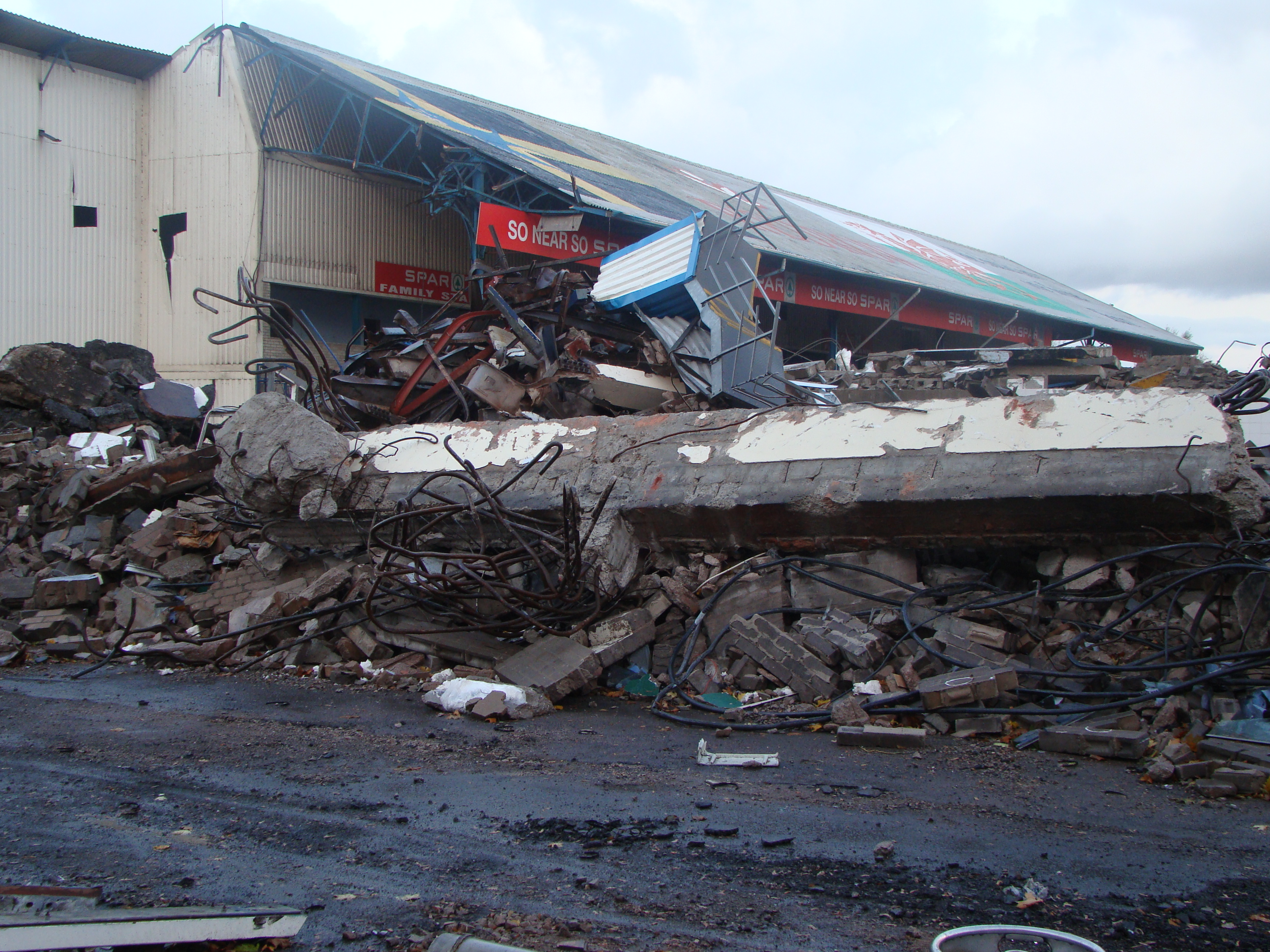
Spar Family Stand

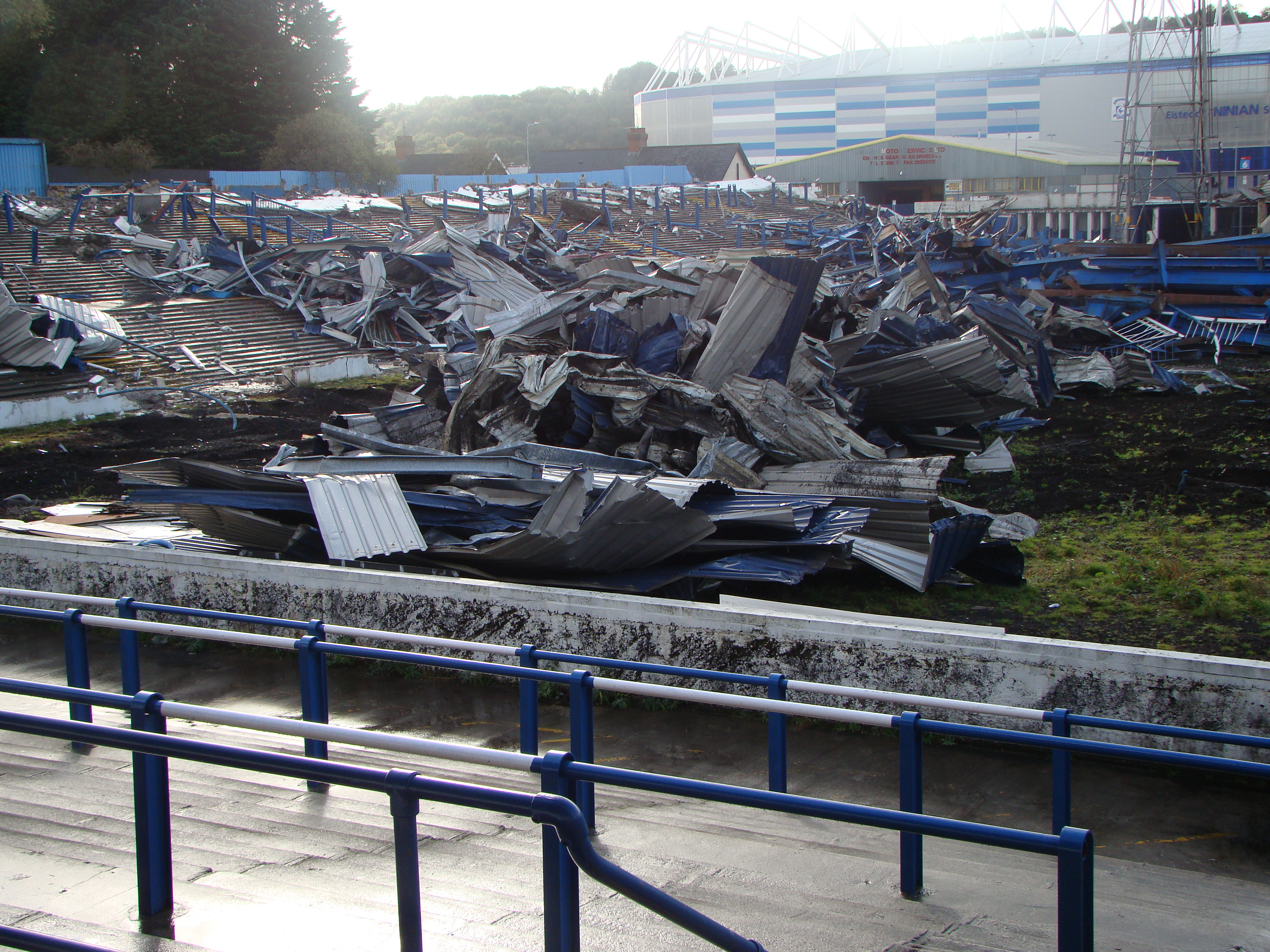
Grange End

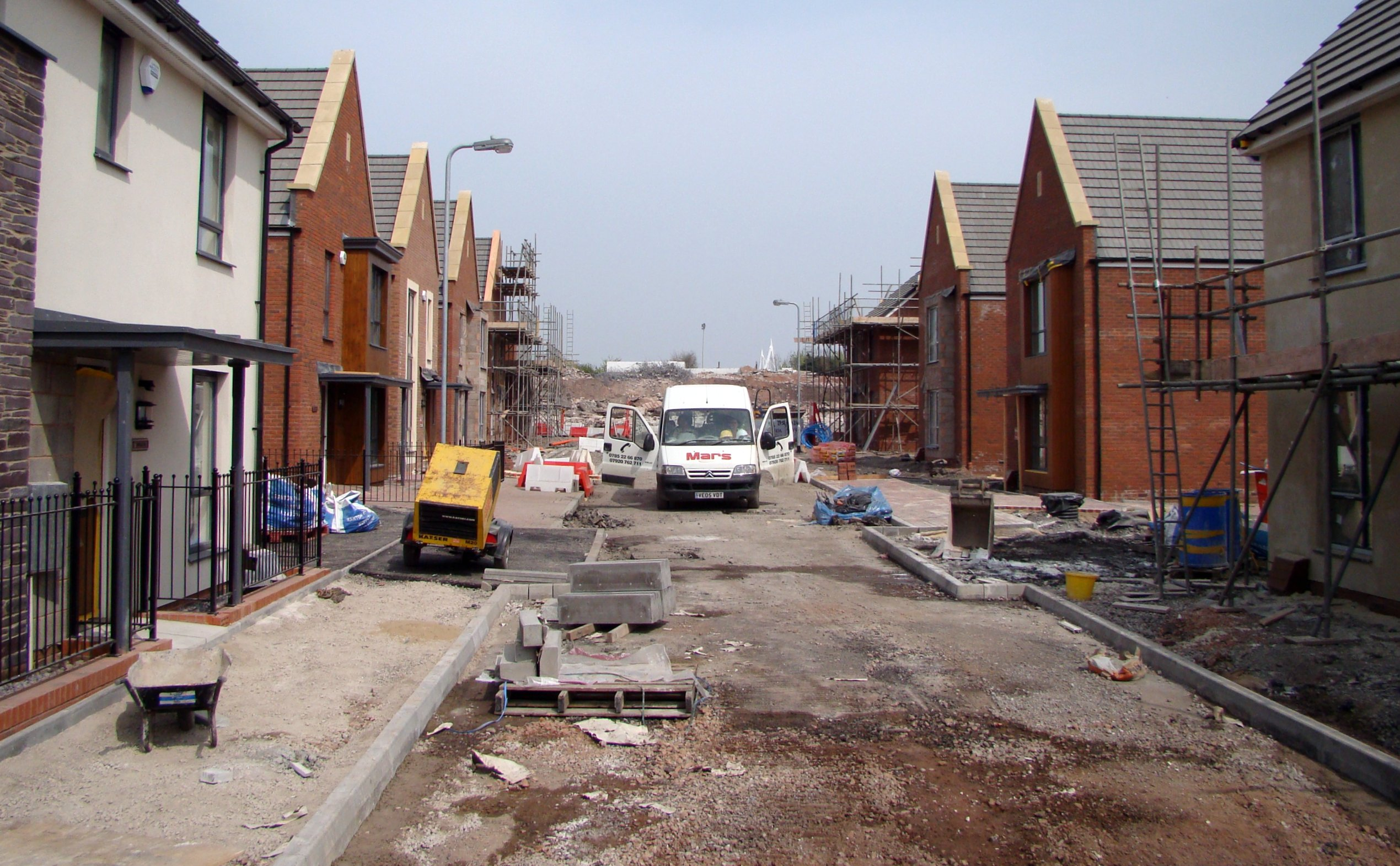
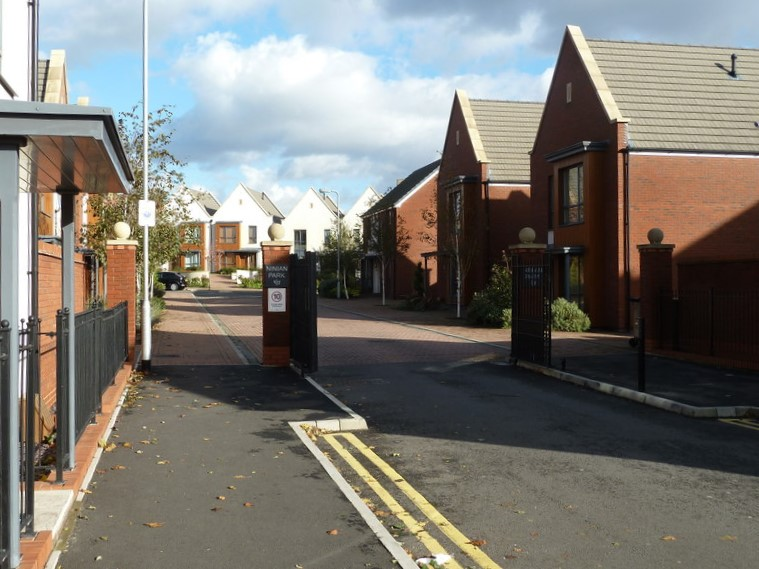
New housing on Ninian Park

The stadium was handed over to Redrow Homes by Cardiff City chairman Peter Ridsdale on 10 September 2009. Redrow was to build 142 new homes on the site. The development was still to be known as Ninian Park. A planted square was proposed at the centre of the new housing development, in the area of Ninian Park football ground's centre spot. The first show home of the £24m development was to open by late spring 2010, with a mixture of terraced, detached and semi-detached houses.

The estate welcomed its first residents in November 2010. The main road was named Bartley Wilson Way after the founder of Cardiff FC.

== See also ==
- Ground improvements at British football stadia
- Cardiff Arms Park – the former Cardiff Blues stadium
- Ninian Park – the former Cardiff City stadium
