= By Default =

Studio album by Band of Skulls
- Released: 27 May 2016
- Studio: Rockfield Studios, Wales
- Genre: Blues rock; dance-rock
- Length: 66:16
- Label: BMG
- Producer: Gil Norton

Band of Skulls chronology
Himalayan (2014)	By Default (2016)	Love Is All You Love (2019)

Singles from By Default
- 1. "Killer" Released: 10 March 2016; 2. "So Good" Released: 28 April 2016; 3. "Bodies" Released: 19 May 2016; 4. "In Love by Default" Released: 25 May 2016; 5. "Embers" Released: 25 May 2016

By Default is the fourth studio album by British rock band Band of Skulls, released on 27 May 2016 through BMG as the band's first release by a major label. The album was the last album to feature drummer Matt Hayward before his departure in 2017.

== Reception ==
Professional ratings
Aggregate scores
Source	Rating
Metacritic	57/100
Review scores
Source	Rating
Classic Rock	4/5 stars
Drowned in Sound	3/10 stars
Exclaim!	5/10 stars
The Independent	2/5 stars
musicOMH	3.5/5 stars

By Default has received mixed to negative reviews from critics with many criticising the album of being forgettable and lacking excitement. Drowned in Sound were especially critical of the album's lyrics, which were described as "misogynistic" and making "fuck all sense". However, in a positive review, Classic Rock Magazine praised the album's use of synthesizers and wide variety of influences including Iggy Pop and T Rex.

== Track listing ==
No.	Title	Length
1.	"Black Magic"	2:49
2.	"Back of Beyond"	3:09
3.	"Killer"	3:28
4.	"Bodies"	3:13
5.	"Tropical Disease"	3:18
6.	"So Good"	3:23
7.	"This is My Fix"	3:47
8.	"Little Mamma"	3:19
9.	"Embers"	4:09
10.	"In Love by Default"	3:43
11.	"Erounds"	3:47
12.	"Something"	3:01

== Personnel ==
- Russell Marsden – vocals, guitar
- Emma Richardson – bass guitar, vocals
- Matt Hayward – drums
- Tom Coyne – mastering
- Gil Norton – production, mixing

== Charts ==
Chart performance for By Default
Chart (2016)	PeaK position
Australian Albums (ARIA)	54
Belgian Albums (Ultratop Flanders)	120
UK Albums (OCC)	41
