= Glamorgan Archives =

Welsh county record office

- Archifau Morgannwg
- Logo of Glamorgan Archives

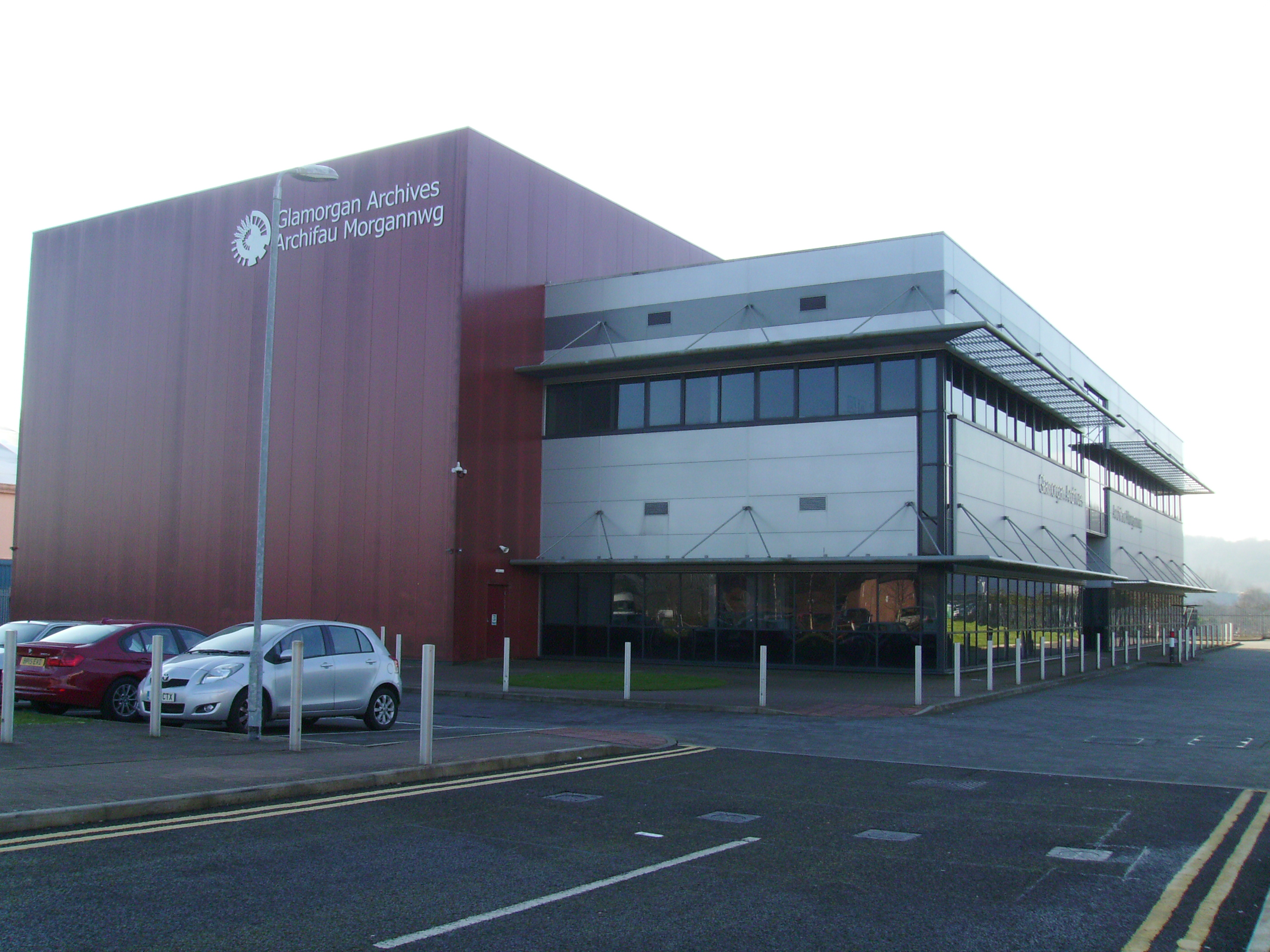
- The Glamorgan Archives building in Leckwith

County record office overview
- Formed: 1939
- Headquarters: Clos Parc Morgannwg, Leckwith, Cardiff; 51.4711°N 3.2014°W
- Employees: 20
- Website: glamarchives.gov.uk

The Glamorgan Archives (Welsh: Archifau Morgannwg), previously known as the Glamorgan Record Office, is a county record office and repository based in Leckwith, Cardiff, Wales. It holds records for the whole of the historic county of Glamorgan but primarily for the post 1974 counties of Mid and South Glamorgan.

== Background ==
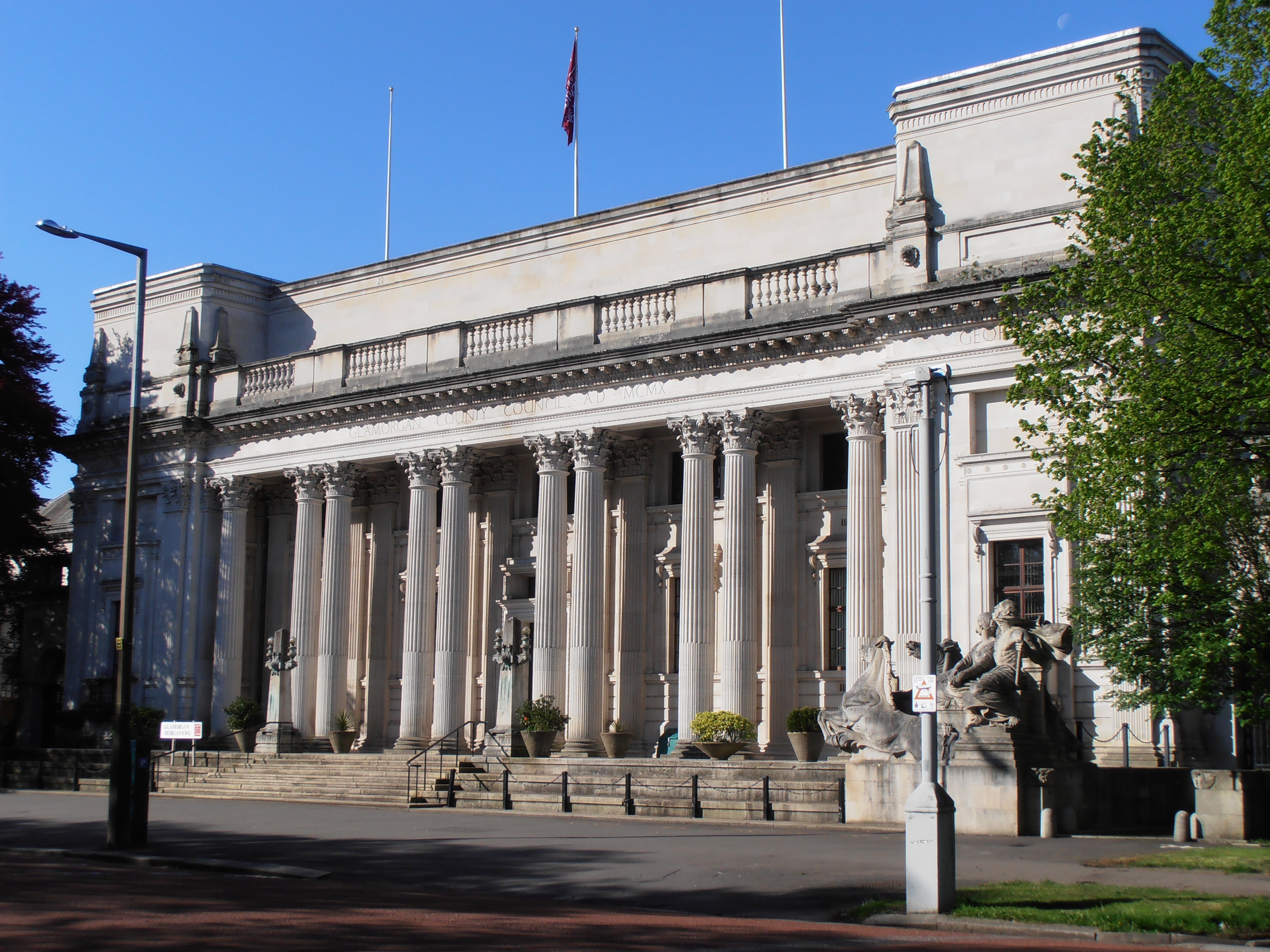
Glamorgan Building (previously Glamorgan County Hall)

Glamorgan County Council created Glamorgan Record Office in 1939 (the second county archive in Wales) with Emyr Gwynne Jones becoming Wales' first full-time archivist. The Record Office was based in the Glamorgan County Hall in Cathays Park, Cardiff. Following the local government reorganisation in 1974 Glamorgan was split into three (West, Mid and South) and in 1982 the records for the West Glamorgan area were moved to Swansea. In 1989 severe problems with damp were discovered in the Glamorgan Record Office strongrooms, leading to the public search room being closed for 4 months.

In the 2000s plans were made to move the archives to a new site. A proposed move to a new building near Callaghan Square fell through in 2006. In 2007 a site was found off Sloper Road, part of the new Leckwith Development which included the new Cardiff City Stadium. The new Glamorgan Archives building was completed in 2009 and officially opened in Spring 2010.

An appeal against Glamorgan Archives' business rates backfired in 2010, resulting in the rates bill increasing from £150,000 to £400,000 per year. Glamorgan Archives were forced to reduce from 17 to 14 staff to be able to pay the extra cost.

Since April 2020, the current Glamorgan Archivist is Laura Cotton who took over from Susan Edwards after 24 years of service.

== Services ==
Glamorgan Archives currently provides archive services for Cardiff, Bridgend, Caerphilly, Merthyr Tydfil, Rhondda Cynon Taf and the Vale of Glamorgan councils.

In late 2015 material from Carmarthenshire Archives were transferred to Cardiff, following a severe outbreak of mould at Carmarthenshire's Parc Myrddin building.

== Glamorgan Archivists ==
The following list shows the tenures of each Glamorgan Archivist since its inception in 1939.

- 1939: Emyr Gwynne Jones (tenure disrupted by World War II)
- 1946-1973: Madeline Elsas
- 1973-1993: Patricia Moore
- 1993-1996: Annette Burton
- 1996-2020: Susan Edwards
- 2020–present: Laura Cotton (nee Robertson)

== See also ==
- Leckwith development
- Gwent Archives
