= Welsh Athletics =

Governing body of athletics in Wales

- Sport: Athletics
- Jurisdiction: Wales
- Abbreviation: WA
- Founded: 2007
- Affiliation: UK Athletics
- Headquarters: Cardiff International Sports Stadium
- Location: Cardiff, Wales
- President: Graham Finlayson
- Chairperson: Steve Perks
- CEO: James Williams

Official website
- www.welshathletics.org

Welsh Athletics (WA; Welsh: Athletau Cymru) is the governing body for the sport of athletics in Wales. It was set up as a limited company in 2007, replacing the former Athletic Association of Wales. Welsh Athletics is part of UK Athletics, the national governing body for the sport in the United Kingdom.

Welsh Athletics currently administers more than 100 affiliated clubs as well as more than 12,000 registered members across the sport.

The headquarters are at Cardiff International Sports Stadium.
