= Cardiff City Stadium =

Stadium in Wales

Coordinates: 51°28′22″N 3°12′11″W

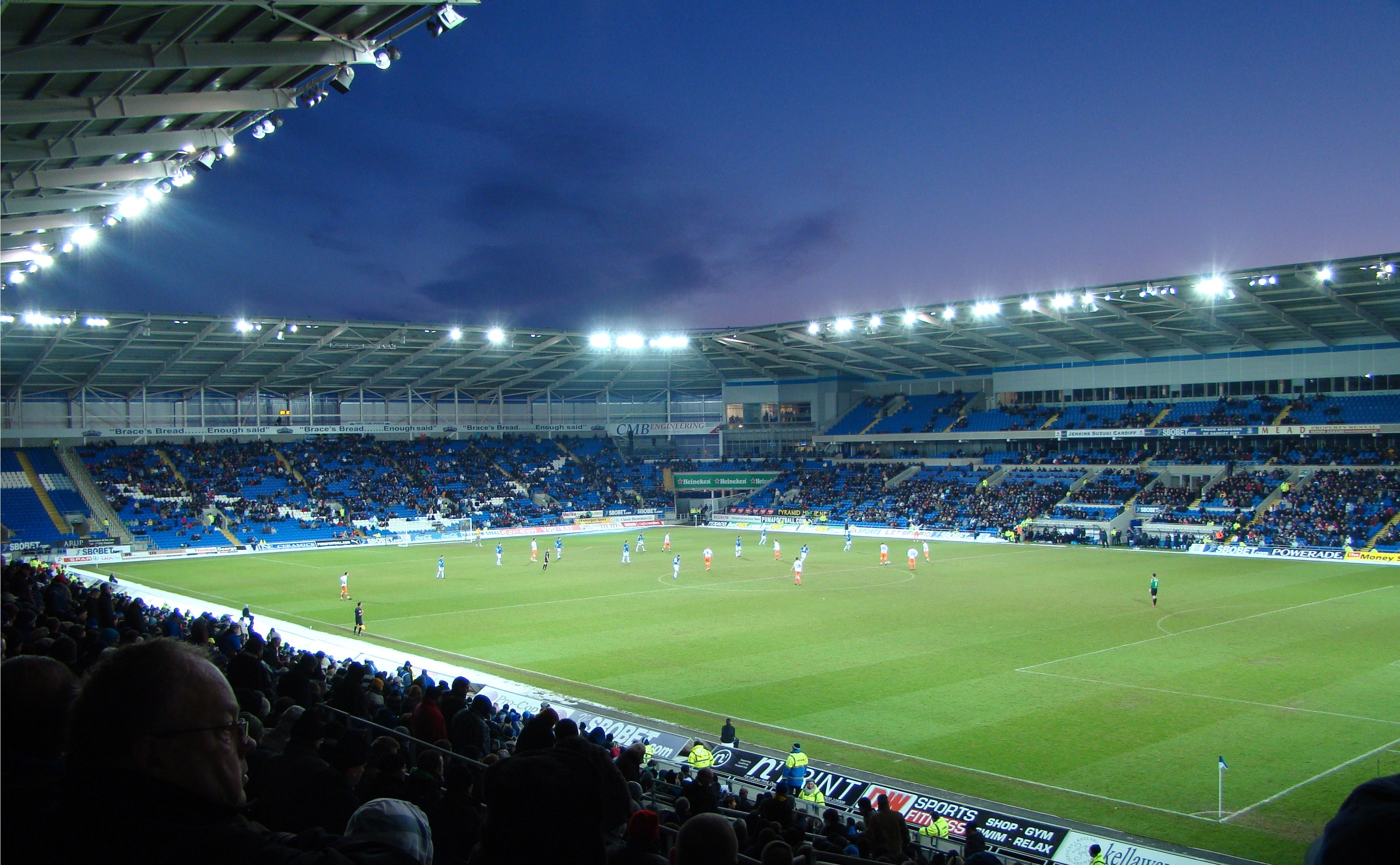
- UEFA
- Interactive map of Cardiff City Stadium
- Full name: Cardiff City Stadium
- Location: Cardiff, Wales
- Owner: Cardiff City
- Operator: Cardiff City Stadium Ltd
- Capacity: 33,280
- Surface: GrassMaster
- Public transit: Ninian Park; Grangetown

Construction
- Groundbreaking: September 2007
- Built: 2007–2009
- Opened: 22 July 2009; 17 years ago
- Renovated: 2014
- Cost: £48 million
- Architect: Arup Associates

Tenants
- Cardiff City (2009–present); Wales national football team (2009–present); Cardiff Blues (2009–2012)

Cardiff City Stadium (Welsh: Stadiwm Dinas Caerdydd) is a stadium in the Leckwith area of Cardiff, Wales. It is the home of Cardiff City and the Wales national team.

Following expansion of the Ninian Stand in July 2014, the stadium officially holds 33,280 supporters. The stadium replaced Ninian Park as Cardiff City's home ground in 2009, and is managed by Cardiff City Stadium Ltd., which is owned by Cardiff City Football Club Holdings Ltd. It also hosted the home matches of the Cardiff Blues rugby union team until the 2011–12 season, although originally the Blues had a lease until 2029.

After the Millennium Stadium, it is the second largest stadium in Cardiff and in Wales. The stadium is part of the Leckwith development, which also includes the Cardiff International Sports Stadium. A branded sponsor name will be assigned as and when the naming rights are sold. The stadium was officially opened on 22 July 2009, with Cardiff City playing a friendly match against Celtic.

== Overview ==
The stadium was built on the site of the former Cardiff Athletics Stadium and forms part of the larger Leckwith development. The 60-acre (240,000 m^{2}) development was estimated to cost £100m and include construction of the following:

- A 28,018 seater stadium
- Field size: 100m x 68m
- A new athletics stadium (Cardiff International Sports Stadium)
- 470,000 sq ft (44,000 m^{2}) retail development between 13 major retailers (Capital Retail Park)
- A housing development on the site of Ninian Park
- Brand new 70-room hotel with bar & restaurant
- A new road system
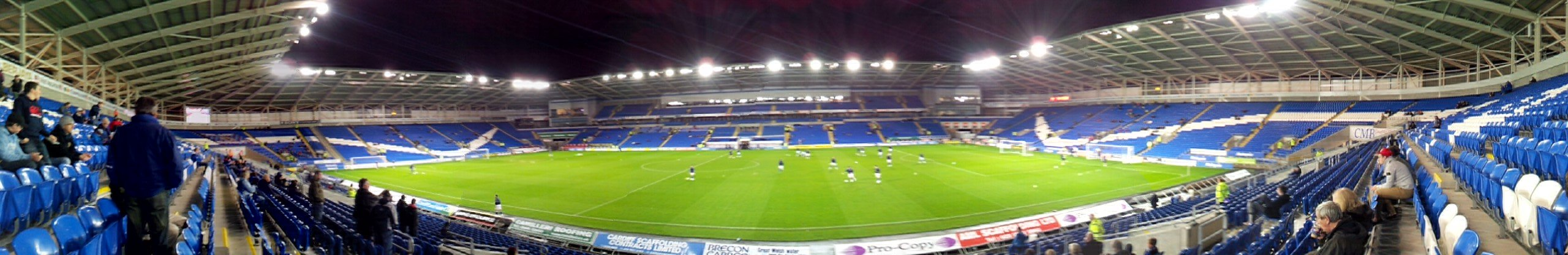
Inside the Cardiff City Stadium before the stadium expansion

== History ==
=== Background to construction ===
First mooted as a long term target by former owner Sam Hammam, the new stadium first gained public approval after a meeting between Hammam and then Cardiff Lord Mayor Russell Goodway in January 2002, giving the club 12 months to agree a planning and business plan. In November 2002 the club and Cardiff Council signed an outline agreement for the development, subject to later agreement for outline planning permission.

In March 2003, stories began to emerge that the Chief Executive of the Millennium Stadium wanted Cardiff City to use their stadium instead, and saw no viable plan for two 50,000+ seat capacity stadia in the Welsh capital. This was increased in light of Cardiff City's promotion to the Championship in May 2003 with local fears over traffic and access problems.

However, on 20 August 2003 Cardiff councillors gave unanimous approval to the stadium plans, although expressed concerns over the need and scale of the retail development but understood its need to fund the stadium. On 9 September 2003 the Welsh Assembly gave approval to the plan.

In April 2004, Cardiff Council gave the first phase covering the stadium with a capacity of 30,000 seats and new athletics track approval. The next phase was held up by various legal and technical delays from November 2004 to January 2005, when the council gave approval to three detailed plans for the retail development, subject to agreement of suitable underlying business plans.

Although development could have then started in May 2005, the underlying need for seed financing revealed the financial status of Cardiff City football club as poor, with over £30 million of debt and the need to sell star player and club captain Graham Kavanagh to Wigan Athletic F.C. in March 2005. It was also revealed that players and staff had not been paid for a month as the club struggled to honour a wage bill believed to be £750,000 a month, while auditors were looking at possible cutbacks. On 1 March 2005 the club delayed the development until at least July 2005.

After a 1–0 home loss to Sheffield United and a mobbing by fans, on 6 March 2005 Hammam apologised to fans, and released club accounts which showed club debt at March 2004 at £29.6 million.

After a summer sale of players, the entry of former Leeds United chairman Peter Ridsdale and numerous rumours, the development was given a period of 90 days from 31 December 2005 by Cardiff Council to finalise the underlying business plan. On 31 January 2006 the developers secured Asda as the lead retailer of the new development, which enabled the final funding of the stadium to start. This allowed the council timetable to extend by four months to September 2006.

On 24 October 2006, Laing O'Rourke won the contract to develop the 30,000-seat stadium, which Ridsdale stated would be ready for December 2008. On 27 November 2006 Cardiff Council approved the business plan for the stadium, and granted a 125-year lease for the land on which the stadium was to sit upon, allowing the final planning approval to be gained from the council authority and the office of the Deputy Prime Minister.

In March 2007, the stadium plans were altered to allow construction to begin as soon as possible. To minimise construction costs, the 30,000 capacity was reduced to 25,000 by removing three-quarters of the second tier of seating, however the plans allow the option of completing the second tier to reach the 30,000 capacity if required. The former chairman of Cardiff City, Steve Borley, said in March 2008 that "We are working to raise the capacity and right now it stands at 26,830. The task is to raise that even further, and we believe it could be almost 28,000 when the stadium opens."

When work finally commenced Peter Ridsdale stated that he expected the stadium to be ready by Christmas 2008 but it was finally completed in May 2009. Although some believe this slight delay was caused by Cardiff City's ongoing legal action with Langston, it was actually caused by unexpectedly poor weather during the summer of 2007.

=== Stadium construction ===
Construction of the Cardiff City Stadium

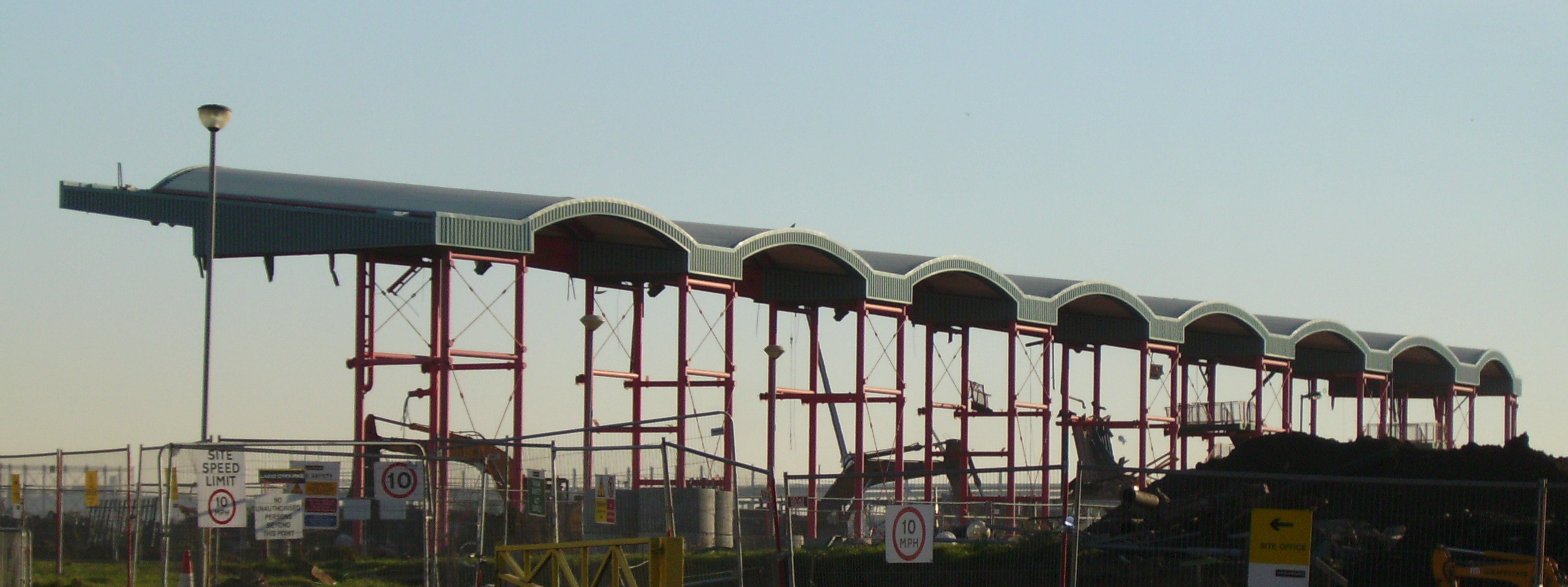
Demolition of the Cardiff Athletics Stadium in November 2007

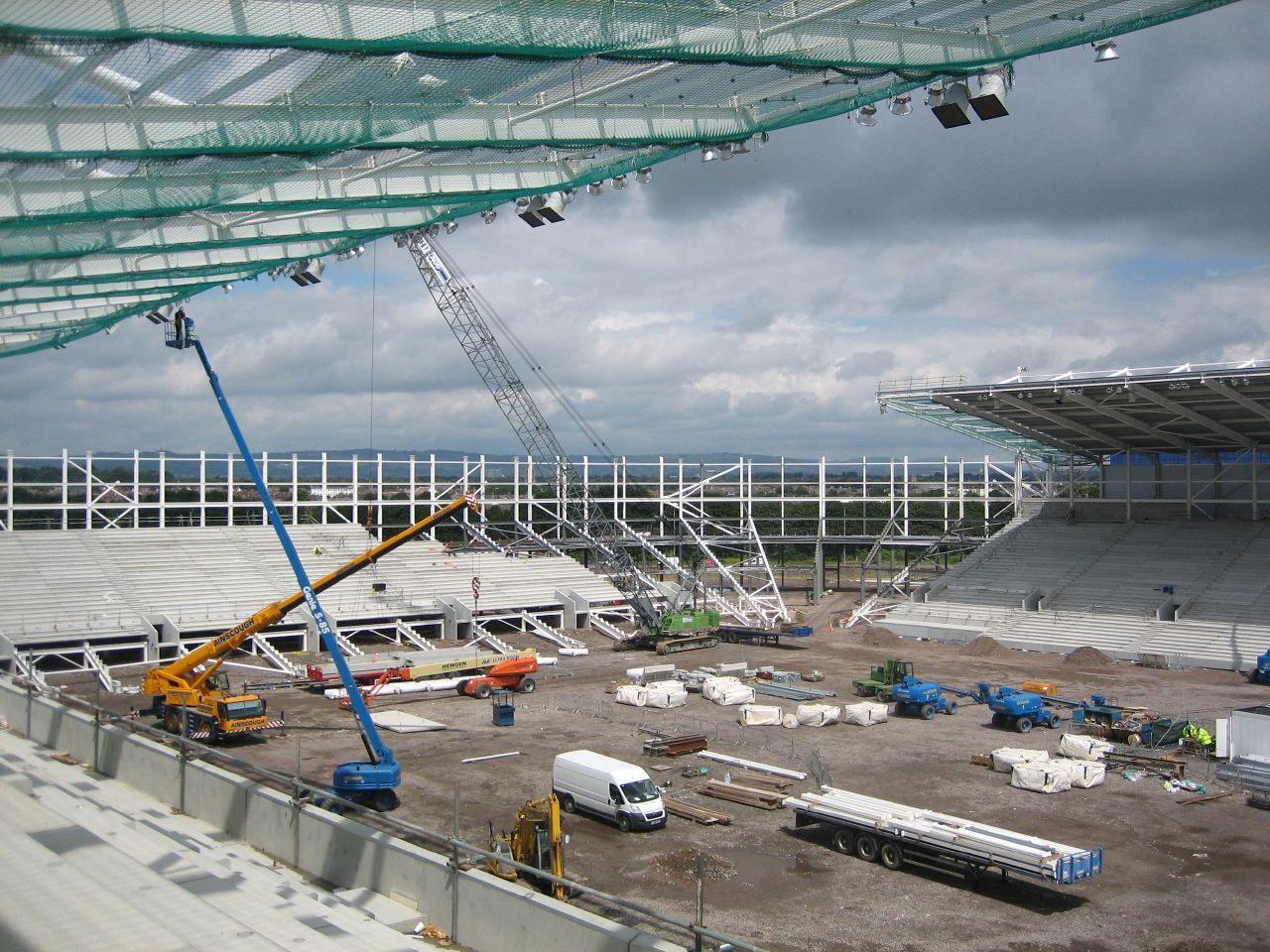
The Canton Stand (left) and Ninian Stand (right) during construction, July 2008

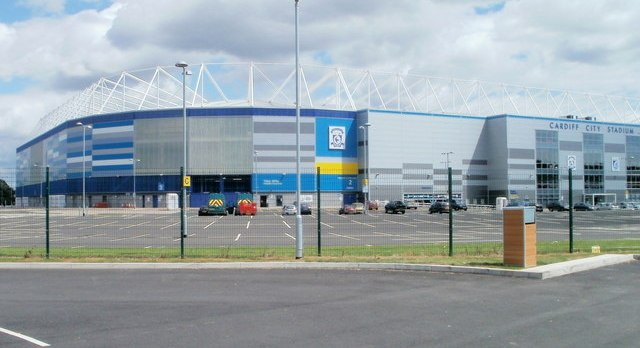
Completion of the Canton Stand (left) and the Grandstand (right)

Land clearance started on 21 February 2007, while on 9 May, final finances were put in place for Laing O'Rourke to bring equipment on site and start construction.

Developers and contractors

The lead developer was PMG Developments, a Cardiff-based property developer led by Cardiff City director Paul Guy and former Wales rugby captain Mike Hall. Laing O'Rourke were contracted to build all the highway improvements necessary to cope with the increased capacity, as well as the demolition of the Cardiff Athletics Stadium and the construction of the retail park. Cowlin was picked as the preferred contractor for the new athletic stadium. Required analysis of soil and water for the site was performed by TES Bretby, part of the Environmental Services Group Ltd.

Schedule

Leckwith Road was widened to a dual carriageway over 18 months, with the scheme allowing for an extra access lane to become available on matchdays.

The plan required the demolition of the previous Cardiff Athletics Stadium, of which the council insisted the replacement is built before the start of construction on the new football stadium. This was to avoid the city being without a major athletics facility for any length of time.

Work was scheduled to begin on the new athletics stadium in January 2007 with the track and throwing areas expected to be open for use by the end of July 2007. The new athletics stadium was expected to be completed by October 2007 and it was hoped that Cardiff City F.C.'s stadium would be able to open in December 2008, however the stadium finally completed in May 2009.

Detailed timetable

- 27 November 2006: Stadium business plan approved by Cardiff Council
- November 2006: Three-month period began for possible legal challenge to deal. The council also had to receive approval from the National Assembly for disposal of the Leckwith land at less than market value
- Early 2007: Work started
- Early Spring 2007: Building of the retail park begin along with the major highways works around Leckwith Road
- Summer 2007: New athletics track finished around the middle of the summer
- October 2007: Commence main contract works
- Christmas 2007: Complete demolition works
- January 2008: Commence piling
- March 2008: Commence steelwork
- Summer 2008: Commence cladding
- Autumn 2008: Complete structure
- October 2008: West stand weathertight
- Christmas 2008: Fit-out access
- January 2009: Power on
- May 2009: Stadium completed

In August 2007, chairman Peter Ridsdale revealed that the club had reduced a £24 million debt to Swiss-based financiers Langston agreed under the chairmanship of Sam Hammam to £15 million, by agreeing to sell the stadium's naming rights to Langston for £9 million. The stadium name was unveiled in March 2009 as Cardiff City Stadium and on 1 May, the official logo of the Cardiff City Stadium and the management company Cardiff City Stadium Ltd was unveiled.

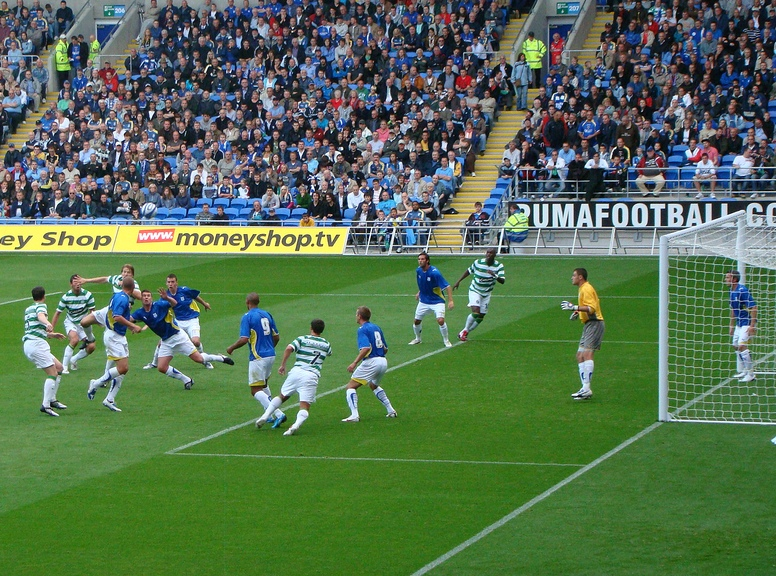
The official opening match between Cardiff City and Celtic on 22 July 2009

The stadium was completed several weeks ahead of schedule and was officially opened with a pre-season friendly against Celtic on 22 July 2009, which ended in a 0–0 draw. There were two games played in the stadium prior to this: a Cardiff City Legends game on 4 July, and a friendly against Chasetown on 10 July. The first league game was played on 8 August 2009, a 4–0 win for Cardiff against Scunthorpe United.

Wales played at the Cardiff City Stadium for the first time on 14 November 2009 against Scotland, which they won 3–0. On 10 August 2010, the Football Association of Wales announced that it would also play at the Stadium in Wales' opening game of the UEFA Euro 2012 qualifiers against Bulgaria on 8 October 2010.

On 8 May 2012, Cardiff Blues confirmed they would leave the Stadium to return to Cardiff Arms Park for the 2012–13 season and onwards.

=== Stadium expansion ===
The expanded Ninian Stand

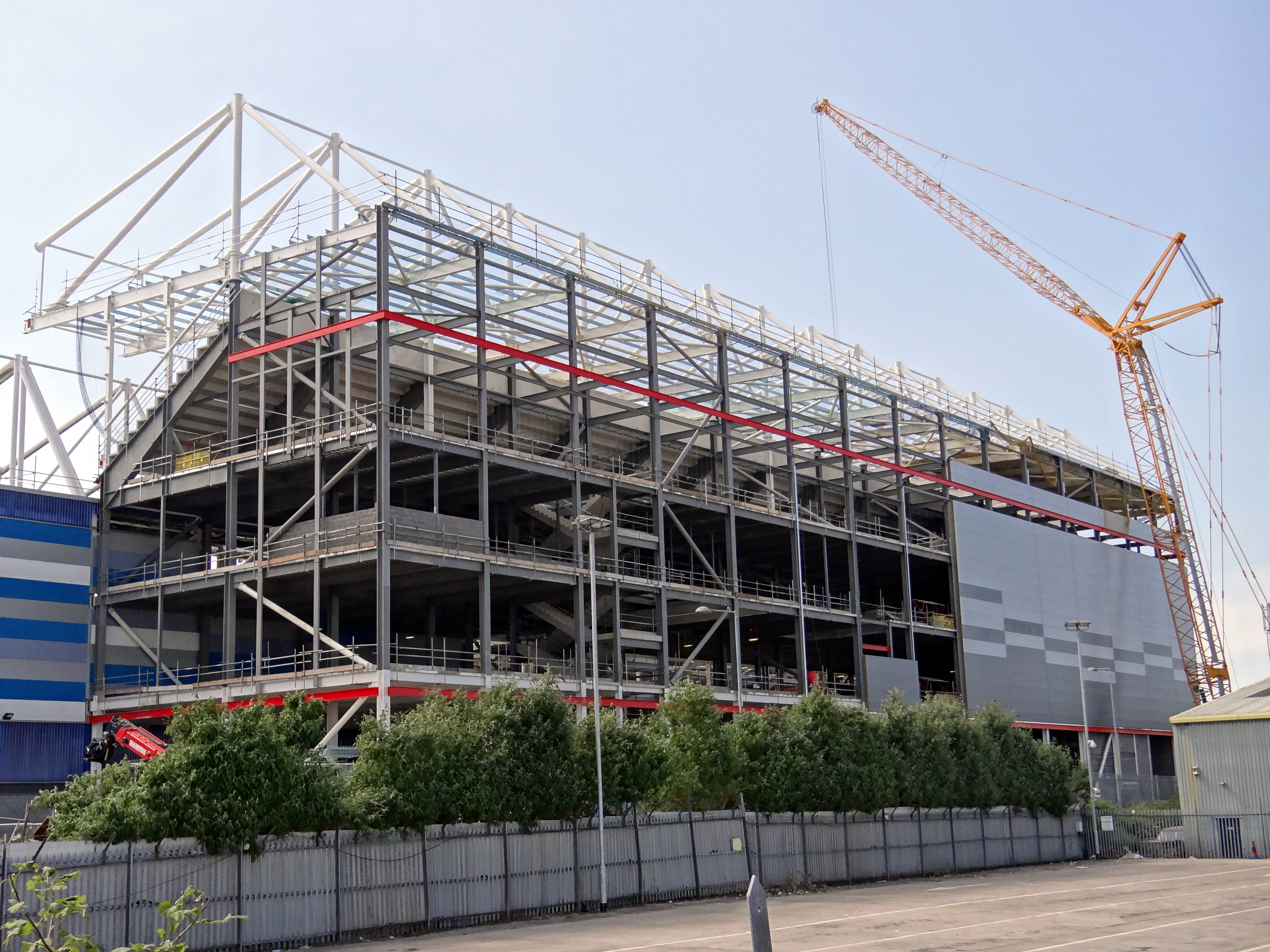
The expanded Ninian Stand under construction in May 2014

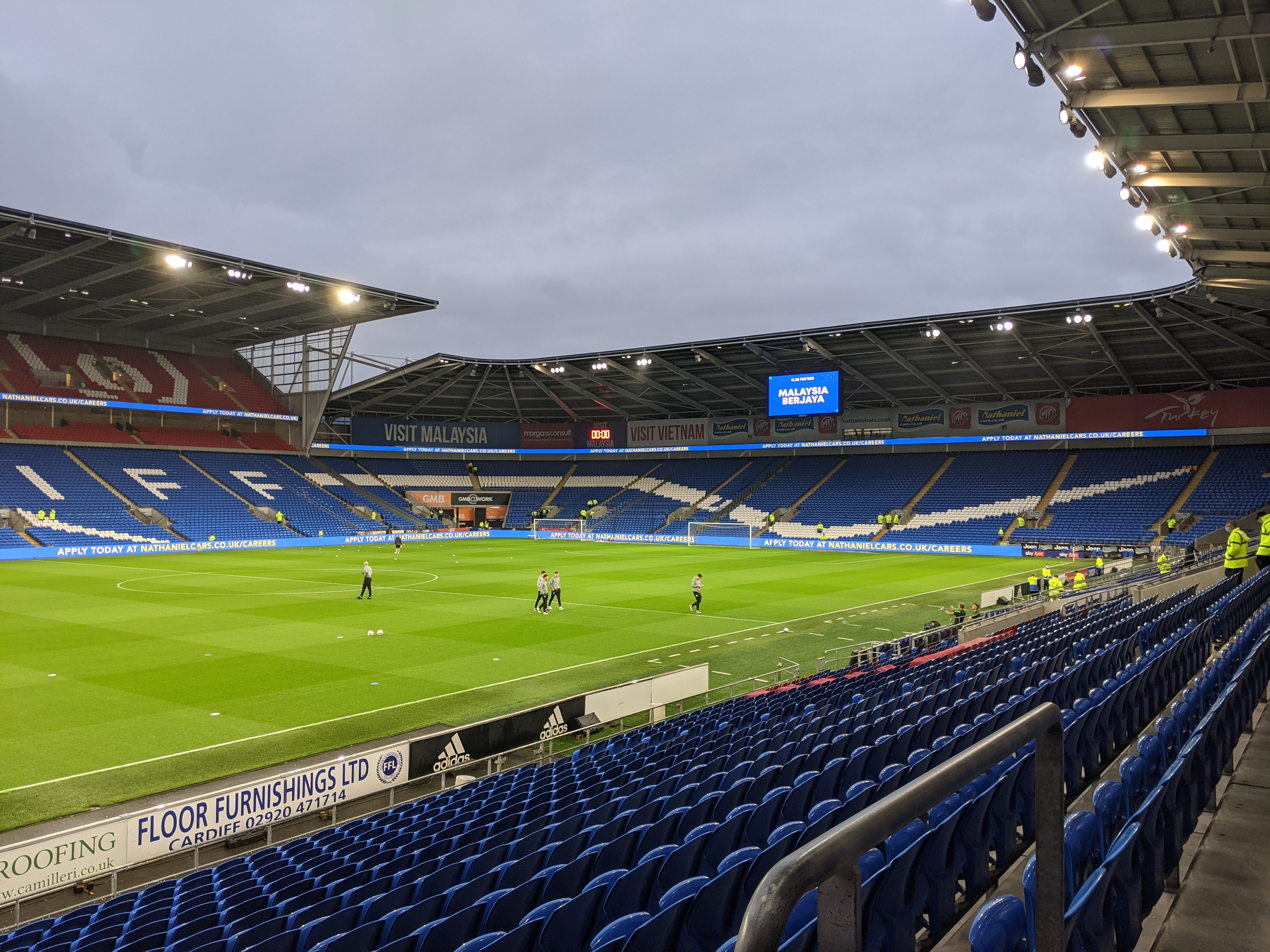
The expanded Ninian Stand in 2021

On 14 June 2012 Vincent Tan, Malaysian co-owner of Cardiff City FC, set out plans for an additional £35m investment in the Championship football club. This investment was to pay off debts, upgrade the training facilities to Premier League standards and spend £12m upgrading the stadium's capacity by 8,000 seats from 26,828 to around 35,000. On 1 August, Peter's Pie became the official sponsor of the Family Stand on a two-year deal. In April 2013 it was announced by a Cardiff City director that the capacity at the stadium could be expanded to 35,000 before the beginning of the 2014/15 season. Extra seats were added around the stadium during the first few months of the 2013–14 season, increasing the capacity to around 28,000.

In August 2013 the club announced it had submitted a planning application to the local authority for the first phase of a stadium expansion. Phase 1 will entail adding a second tier to the Ninian Stand increasing the capacity to approximately 33,280. 5,150 extra seats are to be provided, including extra commercial and hospitality facilities catering for around 1500.

On 9 October 2013 the local authority granted planning permission for this first phase. The stadium expansion was completed at the beginning of August, a few weeks before the stadium was due to host the UEFA Super Cup. At a later stage, phases 2 and 3 of the development will see up to 3,000 seats added to both the Canton and Grange ends of the ground, bringing the overall capacity up to around 38,000.

However, in March 2015, it was announced that the Ninian Stand extension was to be shut for the 2015–16 season due to poor ticket sales, dropping the capacity to 27,978.

== Sport venue ==
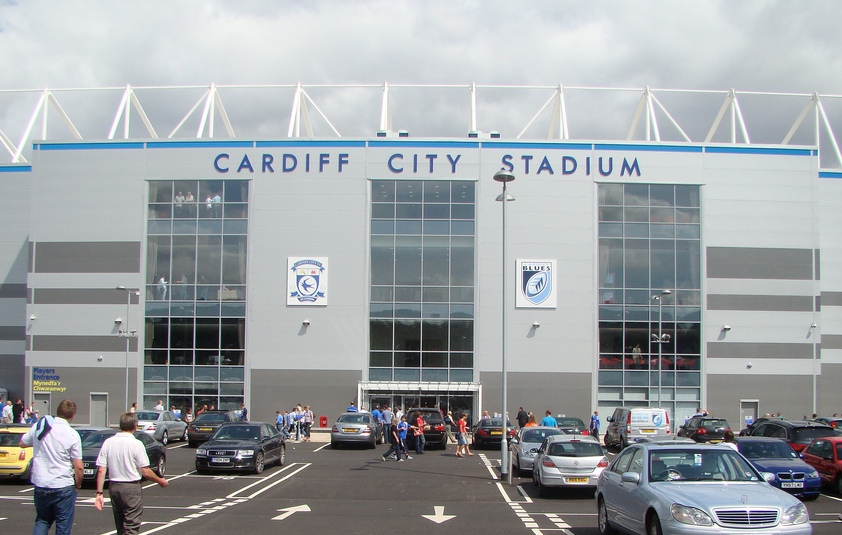
Image taken in April 2011 when the stadium was shared between Cardiff City F.C. and Cardiff Blues

On 19 September 2007, it was announced that Cardiff City F.C. and Cardiff Blues had signed a Heads of Terms agreement for Cardiff Blues to become tenants of Cardiff City. On 24 May 2008, the two clubs signed a contract officially finalising the deal. The licence agreement was set at 20 years, meaning Cardiff Blues would leave Cardiff Arms Park and play their home games at the stadium until 2029.

=== Football ===
As well as being the new home for Cardiff City, the stadium has since become the home of the Wales national football team except for the international friendly against Luxembourg which was at Parc y Scarlets in Llanelli, two UEFA Euro 2012 qualifying Group G home matches with the first against England which was at the Millennium Stadium in Cardiff and the second against Switzerland which was at the Liberty Stadium in Swansea, an international friendly against Bosnia and Herzegovina which was at Parc y Scarlets in Llanelli, another international friendly, which was against Austria and a 2014 FIFA World Cup qualification – UEFA Group A match against Croatia, both of which were at the Liberty Stadium in Swansea.

On 12 August 2014, the stadium hosted the 2014 UEFA Super Cup between the 2013–14 UEFA Champions League winners Real Madrid and the 2013–14 UEFA Europa League winners Sevilla. Real Madrid won 2–0.

On 1 June 2017, it hosted the final of the 2016–17 UEFA Women's Champions League.

In March 2021, it was announced that Newport County would play two games at the Cardiff City Stadium due to the poor pitch conditions at Rodney Parade.

On 20 July 2023, the stadium hosted a 2023–24 UEFA Europa Conference League first qualifying match between Haverfordwest County and KF Shkëndija. Following a 1–1 draw on aggregate, Haverfordwest advanced on penalties.

=== Rugby union ===
Between the 2009–10 season and the 2011–12 season, it was the home of the Cardiff Blues. The Blues left after the 2011–12 season, after a mutual agreement to return to the Arms Park was agreed. The Cardiff City stadium also hosted the 2010–11 Amlin Challenge Cup final between English club Harlequins and French club Stade Français on 20 May 2011 with Harlequins pipping Stade Français 19–18.

== Concert venue ==
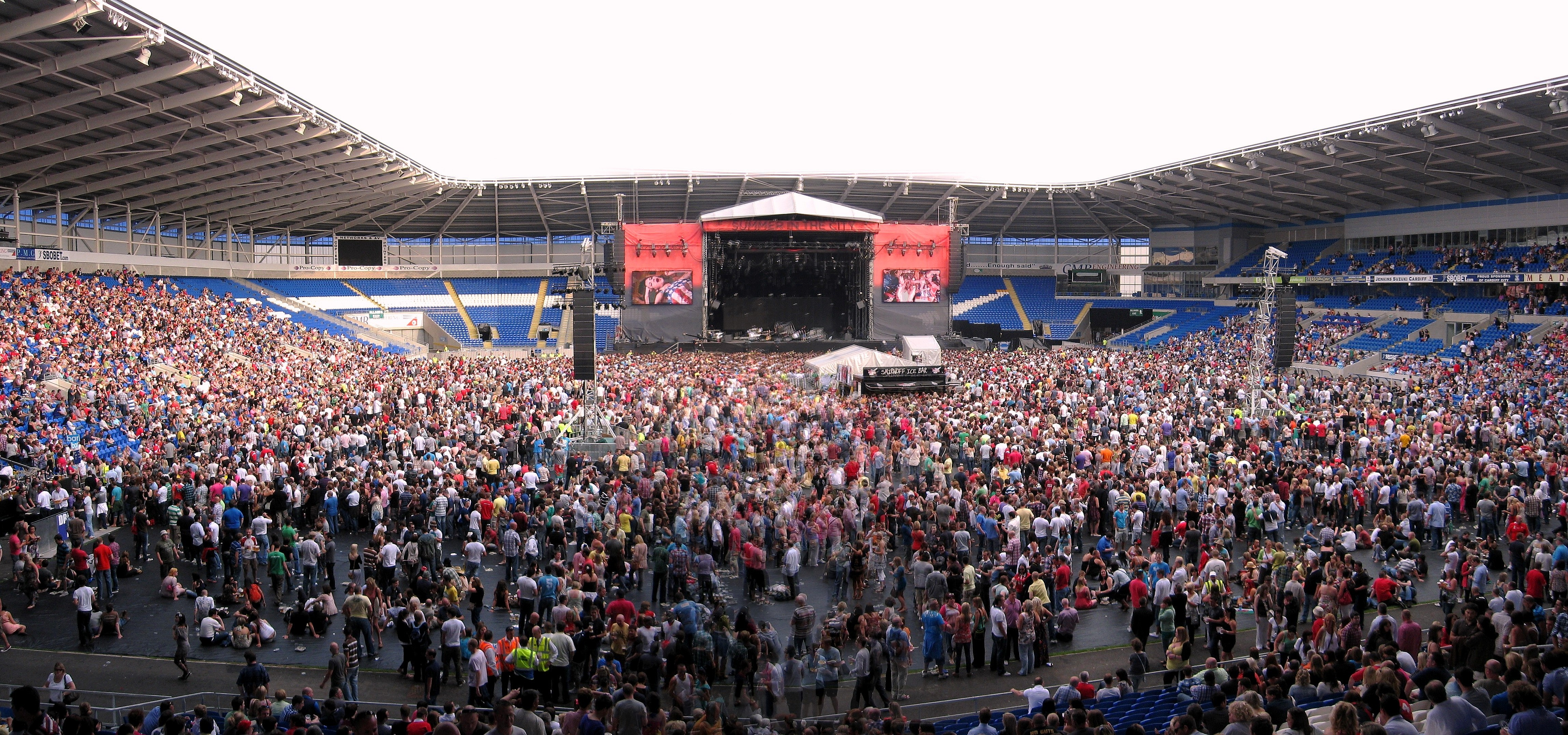

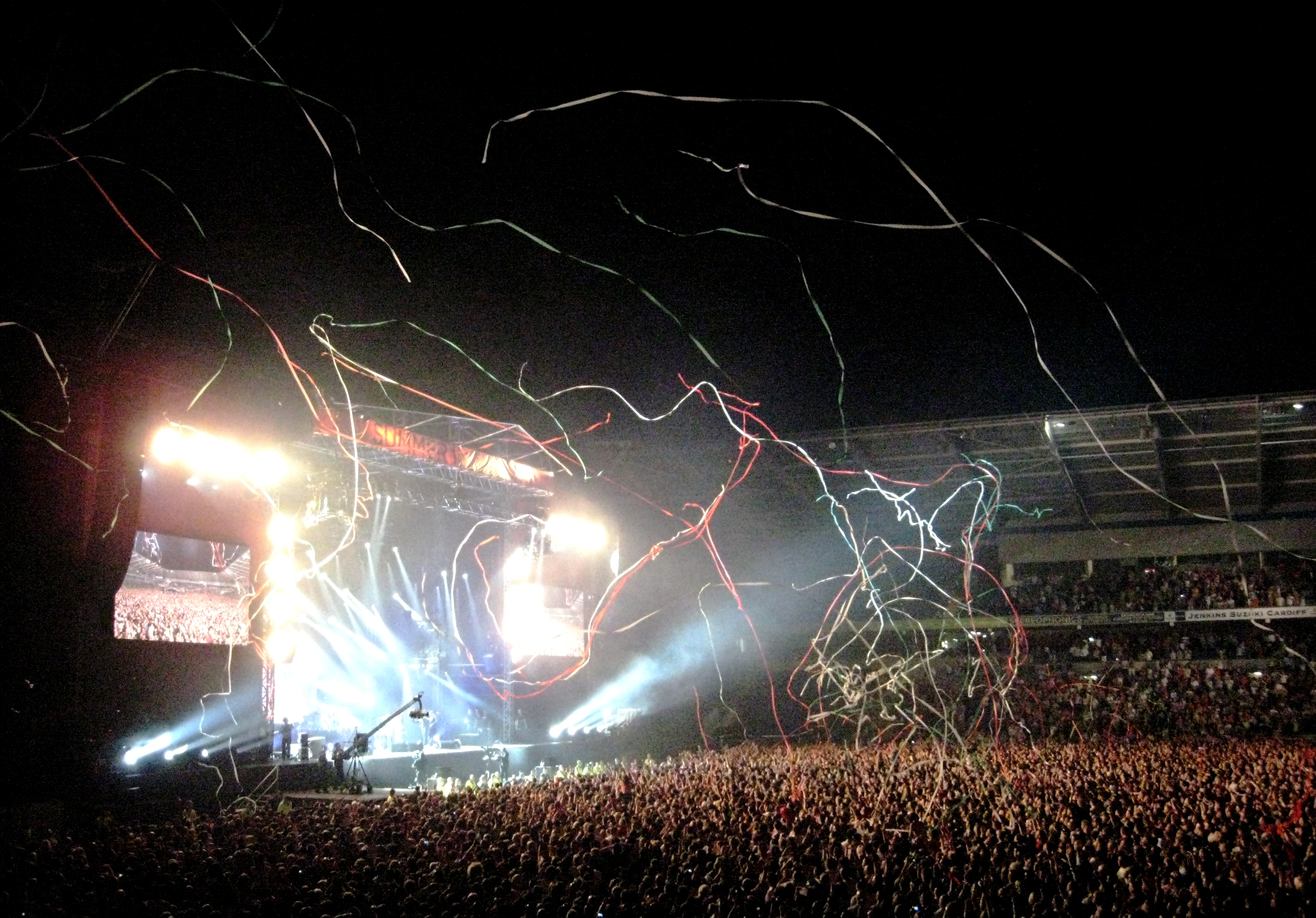
Stereophonics during Summer in the City

Stereophonics headlined the first gig at the stadium on 5 June 2010, having already played a record-breaking 13 previous sell-out shows at the Cardiff International Arena, as well as at the Millennium Stadium and Cardiff Castle. The concert, known as Summer in the City, was supported by Kids In Glass Houses and Doves. Elton John performed at the stadium in June 2019.

=== Touring ===
Date	Artist	Tour/concert	Support acts
5 June 2010	Stereophonics	Summer in the City	Doves; Kids in Glass Houses
12 June 2013	Bon Jovi	Because We Can: The Tour	Kids in Glass Houses
4 June 2016	Stereophonics	Keep the Summer Alive	The Vaccines; Band of Skulls
11 June 2016	Rod Stewart	Hits 2016	The Mariarchis; The Sisterhood
15 June 2019	Elton John	Farewell Yellow Brick Road	
28 July 2023	Duran Duran	Future Past Tour	

== Transport ==
The stadium and surrounding area is served by Ninian Park railway station (on the Cardiff City Line) on one side of Sloper Road, by and Grangetown railway station (on the Vale of Glamorgan Line) on the other side. Trains operate frequently to Central and Queen Street stations in the city centre.

Cardiff Bus service 95 between Central Station and Barry Island stops outside the stadium.

The stadium is next to Leckwith Interchange on the A4232 dual carriageway, linking it northbound to the A48 and M4 (J33 Cardiff West) and southbound to Cardiff Bay and the city centre.

There is limited parking at the stadium itself. Some spaces are available on a first-come, first-served basis, but most are pre-allocated to season ticket holders.

== Statues ==
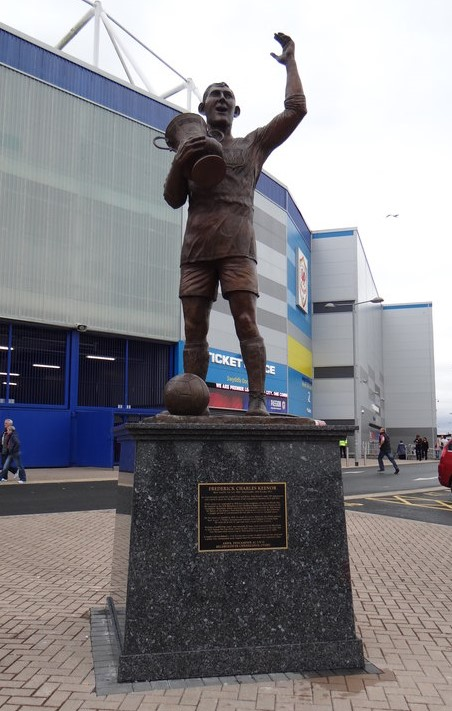
Fred Keenor (1894–1972) statue outside the Stadium.

On 17 December 2009, Cardiff City confirmed a statue of 1927 FA Cup-winning captain Fred Keenor would be built. In May 2012, the £85,000 needed to build the statue was raised by the Cardiff City Supporters Trust and was revealed on 10 November 2012.

== Statistics ==
- Capacity: 33,280 (approx)
- Record attendance: 33,280 (Wales vs Belgium), 12 June 2015
- Record attendance for a Cardiff City match: 33,082 v Liverpool 21 April 2019
- Lowest attendance for a Cardiff City match: 3,500 v Sutton United, 10 August 2021
- Attendance for UEFA Super Cup: 30,854 Real Madrid v Sevilla, 12 August 2014
- First international game held: Wales v Scotland, 14 November 2009
- First Official Game: Cardiff City v Chasetown, 10 July 2009
- First League Game: Cardiff City v Scunthorpe United, 8 August 2009
- First Goalscorer: Jay Bothroyd, Cardiff City v Chasetown, 10 July 2009

=== Average attendances ===
Season	Cardiff City			Cardiff Blues^{[a]}	
Season	Att.	Division	Pos.	Att.	Pos.
2009–10	20,717	Championship	4th	10,853	5th
2010–11	23,193	Championship	4th	6,542	6th
2011–12	22,100	Championship	6th	6,927	7th
2012–13	22,998	Championship	1st		
2013–14	27,429	Premier League	20th		
2014–15	21,123	Championship	11th		
2015–16	16,255	Championship	8th		
2016–17	16,564	Championship	12th		
2017–18	20,164	Championship	2nd		
2018–19	31,408	Premier League	18th		
2019–20	17,861	Championship	5th		
2020–21	0	Championship	8th		
2021–22	18,869	Championship	18th		
2022–23	19,020	Championship	21st		
2023–24	21,213	Championship	12th		
2024–25	19,344	Championship	24th		
2025–26	19,583	League One	2nd		

a Cardiff Blues are always part of the Pro14.

=== Match records ===
As of 25 April 2026

The "Cardiff City Total" games column contains all competitive games, including all league games, including play-offs; as well as cup competitions such as The F.A. Cup and The Football League Cup. There is a separate row recording all competitive home league games which have taken place at the Cardiff City Stadium.

Team	P	W	D	L	For^{[a]}	Against^{[b]}	Win %
Cardiff City (League)	383	176	92	115	543	436	45.95%
Cardiff City (Total)	427	194	98	135	611	512	45.43%
Newport County	2	1	0	1	2	2	50%
Cardiff Blues	49	29	1	19	1060	913	59.18%
Wales (football)	65	32	20	13	96	54	49.23%

a All competitive games are included for Cardiff City and Cardiff Blues clubs, for Wales all games are included.
b All points scored for and against are included for Cardiff Blues.
c Cardiff Blues left the stadium in 2012.

== See also ==
- Sport in Cardiff
- Football in Wales
- Rugby in Cardiff
- Ground improvements at British football stadia
- List of stadiums in Wales by capacity
- List of stadiums in the United Kingdom by capacity

Preceded by Eden Arena; Prague	UEFA Super Cup; Match venue 2014	Succeeded by Boris Paichadze Dinamo Arena; Tbilisi
Preceded by Mapei Stadium – Città del Tricolore; Reggio Emilia	UEFA Women's Champions League; Final venue 2017	Succeeded by Valeriy Lobanovskyi Dynamo Stadium; Kyiv
