= Band of Skulls =

English rock band

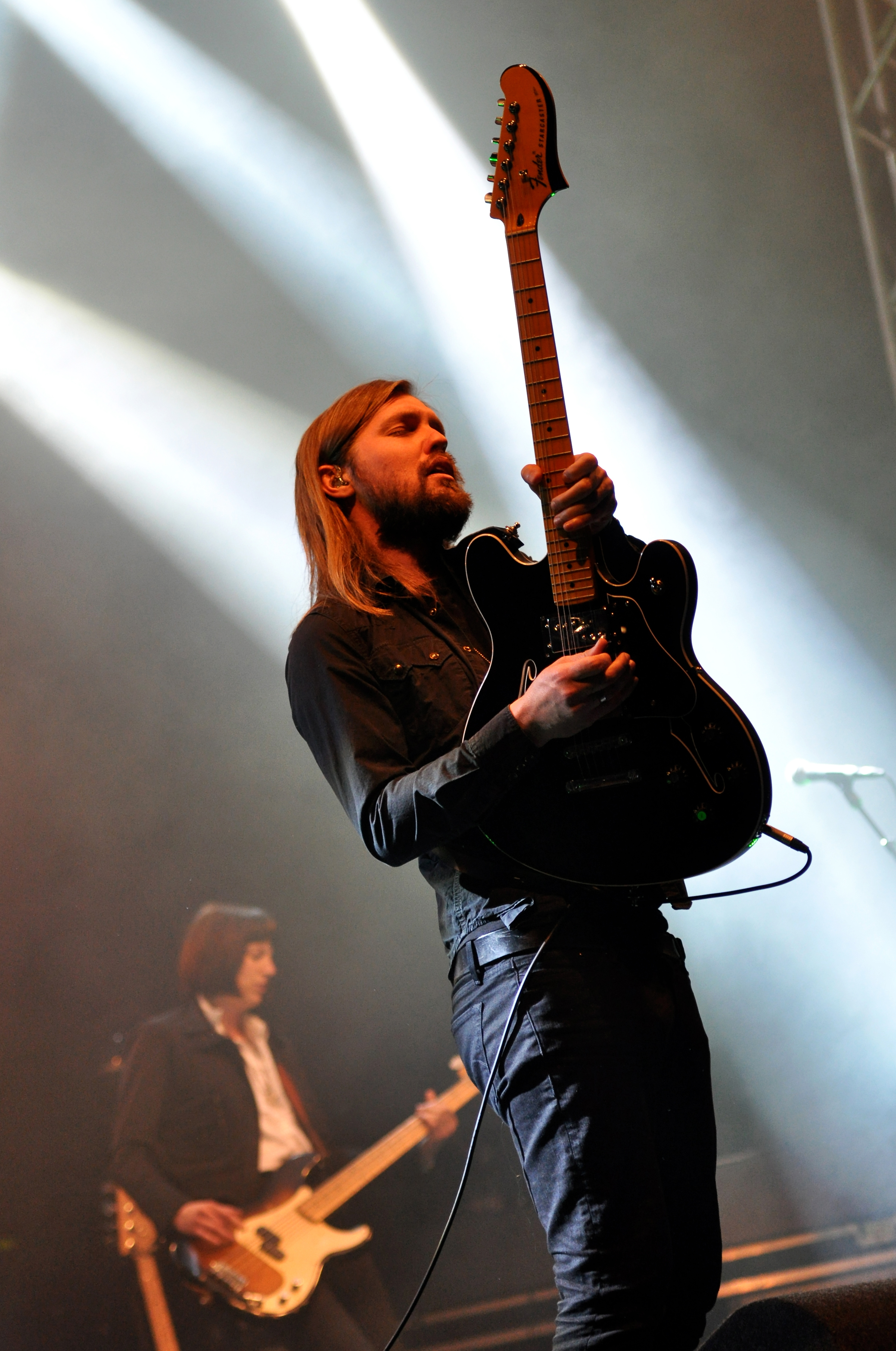
- Guitarist Russell Marsden (front) and former bassist Emma Richardson (back) in 2014

Background information
- Also known as: Fleeing New York (2002–2008)
- Origin: Southampton, England
- Genres: Blues rock; indie rock; garage rock
- Years active: 2002–present
- Labels: Electric Blues/PIAS UK (UK); Vagrant (US); Kobalt; So
- Members: Russell Marsden
- Past members: Matt Hayward; Emma Richardson
- Website: bandofskulls.com

Band of Skulls are an English rock band from Southampton, Hampshire. The band was founded in 2002 by vocalist and guitarist Russell Marsden, vocalist and bassist Emma Richardson and drummer Matt Hayward. The group formed after meeting in college, although Marsden and Hayward had been friends since high school. Following the respective departures of Hayward in 2017 and Richardson in 2022, Marsden has continued on under the moniker as a solo project. Band of Skulls have released five studio albums, the most recent of which was Love Is All You Love in April 2019.

== History ==
Initially, the group played at night clubs in the Greater London area and recorded some demos under the name of Fleeing New York before changing their name briefly to Skulls. The summer of 2008 found the band in the US, where there was already an American band with the same name. In November 2008 they became Band of Skulls. The band's original demos were recorded in Hayward's father's shed-studio.

Band of Skulls' debut album Baby Darling Doll Face Honey, distributed by Shangri-La Music, was released exclusively on the iTunes Store on 6 March 2009, followed by a general release on 20 March. The track "I Know What I Am" was chosen as iTunes' free Single of the Week to coincide with the digital release. The song was also featured in the soundtrack for TV series Friday Night Lights, Volume 2, which was released on 4 May 2010. The song also appeared in Guitar Hero: Warriors of Rock. Another track that was not actually on the album, "Friends", was included on The Twilight Saga: New Moon soundtrack in November 2009.

On 23 March 2010, Band of Skulls released Friends EP, which includes the studio-recorded version of "Friends", a live version, and a music video of the song.

Band of Skulls played at the SXSW Festival in early 2010 and toured the Midwest in March in support of Black Rebel Motorcycle Club. The band appeared on the French TV show Taratata broadcast in March 2010, where they covered the song "Sympathy for the Devil" by the Rolling Stones with the band John & Jehn. In April 2010, they toured the U.S. and Canada followed by England in May 2010, including a sold-out show at the London Electric Ballroom. On 28 June 2010, Band of Skulls supported the Dead Weather at The Roundhouse in London. In July 2010, the band covered Goldfrapp's "Strict Machine" for Australian radio. They were also one of three bands who opened for Muse on 4 September 2010 at Lancashire County Cricket Ground. In October 2010 they also toured to South Africa to play at the annual Rocking The Daisies festival.

On 26 October 2010, Band of Skulls released a live album called Live on KCRW's Morning Becomes Eclectic, containing an in-studio performance from KCRW radio's Morning Becomes Eclectic program. On 5 October 2011, the band released "The Devil Takes Care of His Own" — the first single to be taken from their then-untitled second album — with an accompanying music video. The second studio album, Sweet Sour, was recorded at Rockfield Studios in Wales. It is produced by Ian Davenport (Supergrass, Badly Drawn Boy), who also produced their debut album, and was released on 20 February 2012 in the UK and Europe and 21 February 2012 in the US.

On 12 April 2012, Channel 4 broadcast a short documentary starring the band. They discuss the formation of Band of Skulls through to going from working the bars of their hometown to playing music in front of expansive crowds of adoring fans across the globe. It is a rare and intimate insight into the world of Band of Skulls, focusing of their success and achievements over the years. On 20 March 2014, Band of Skulls performed on Late Night with Seth Meyers. The band played "Asleep at the Wheel". On 22 September 2014, Band of Skulls performed on Later... with Jools Holland playing the title track from their recent album "Himalayan".

Band of Skulls released a new track, "So Good", on 28 April 2016. In January 2017, it was announced via social media that Hayward had left the band. American drummer Julian Dorio filled in on drums for the group's live shows in August 2018. On 10 April 2019 Band of Skulls premiered a video for their song "Love Is All You Love". The video was the third installment in a trilogy ("Cool You Battles" and "We're Alive"), using the same central characters as they lose themselves to the music. Two days later, the band released their fifth album Love Is All You Love.

In 2021, Richardson formed a folk duo with Marsden under the moniker of Marsden & Richardson, releasing a self-titled album in January 2022. Later that year, however, she announced her departure from Band of Skulls to focus on her second career as a painter. She ultimately returned to music two years later, replacing Paz Lenchantin as the new bassist of the Pixies. Marsden, meanwhile, endeavoured to continue Band of Skulls as its sole member. The band played their first show in nearly four years in February 2023, expanding to a five-piece as a live ensemble with Marc MacNab-Jack on drums, Tom Van Heel on keyboards, Spencer Page on bass and Lo Barnes on backing vocals. A new single, "Born in Amazment," was released in April 2024. Later that year, the band announced a retrospective box set entitled Cold Fame, which featured the band's first three studio albums as well as a collection of B-sides and rarities paired with a coffee table book. It was released on November 28th, 2025.

== Musical style ==
AllMusic's James Christopher Monger called the band's music "gritty, ferociously heavy indie rock & roll out of the mist of blues history", while Jon O'Brien of the same website observed a "scuzzy garage rock sound".

== Members ==
=== Current members ===
- Russell Marsden – lead vocals, guitar (2002–present)

=== Current touring musicians ===
- Iona Kohler Alven – backing vocals (2025–present)
- Christina Comley – drums (2026–present)
- Slawek Semeniuk – bass (2026–present)

=== Former members ===
- Matt Hayward – drums (2002–2017)
- Emma Richardson – bass, backing and occasional lead vocals (2002–2022)

=== Former touring musicians ===
- Julian Dorio – drums (2017–2018)
- Tom Van Heel – keyboards (2018–2025)
- Lo Barnes – backing vocals (2023–2025)
- Spencer Page – bass (2023–2025)
- Marc MacNab-Jack – drums (2018–2026)
- Jared Mullins – bass (2025–2026)

== Discography ==
=== Studio albums ===
Title	Details	Peak chart positions				
Title	Details	UK	AUS	IRE	NLD	US
Baby Darling Doll Face Honey	Released: 18 September 2009; Label: You Are Here Music/Band of Skulls (UK), Shangri-La Music (US); Formats: CD, digital download	—	—	—	97	—
Sweet Sour	Released: 17 February 2012; Label: Electric Blues Recordings/PIAS (UK), Vagrant Records (US); Formats: CD, digital download	14	35	53	60	138
Himalayan	Released: 31 March 2014; Label: You Are Here Music/Band of Skulls (UK), Psycollective/Kobalt (US)	21	24	—	84	55
By Default	Released: 27 May 2016; Label: BMG	41	54	—	—	—
Love Is All You Love	Released: 12 April 2019; Label: SO Recordings	30	—	—	—	—

=== Extended plays ===
- Friends EP (23 March 2010)
- Electric Blues EP (2012)

=== Live albums ===
- KCRW's Morning Becomes Eclectic (26 October 2010)
- Live at Brixton (7 December 2012)
- Live at Southampton Guildhall (8 November 2014)

=== Singles ===
Year	Song	Peak chart position				Album
	Song	CAN Alt	CAN Rock	US Alt.	US Main.	Album
2009	"I Know What I Am"	—	—	—	—	Baby Darling Doll Face Honey
2009	"Blood"	—	—	—	—	Baby Darling Doll Face Honey
2009	"Fires"	—	—	—	—	Baby Darling Doll Face Honey
2009	"Death by Diamonds and Pearls"	—	—	—	—	Baby Darling Doll Face Honey
2009	"Friends"	—	—	—	—	Friends EP
2011	"The Devil Takes Care of His Own"	20	45	—	—	Sweet Sour
2012	"Sweet Sour"	—	—	28	—	Sweet Sour
2012	"Bruises"	—	—	—	—	Sweet Sour
2012	"You’re Not Pretty But You Got It Going On"	—	—	—	—	Sweet Sour
2013	"Asleep at the Wheel"	—	—	—	33	Himalayan
2014	"Nightmares"	—	—	—	—	Himalayan
2016	"Killer"	—	—	—	—	By Default
2016	"So Good"	—	—	—	—	By Default
2016	"Bodies"	—	—	—	—	By Default
2016	"In Love By Default"	—	—	—	—	By Default
2016	"Embers"	—	—	—	—	By Default
2019	"Cool Your Battles"	—	—	—	—	Love Is All You Love
2026	"Bitter Dream"	—	—	—	—	Bitter Dream

=== Collaborations ===
Year	Title	Artist	Album
2019	"Remains of Nothing"	Archive	25 (2019)

== Awards ==
- Independent Music Awards 2013: "Sweet Sour" – Best Rock/Hard Rock Song
