= Cardiff International Sports Campus =

Athletics venue in Wales

- Campws Chwaraeon Rhyngwladol Caerdydd

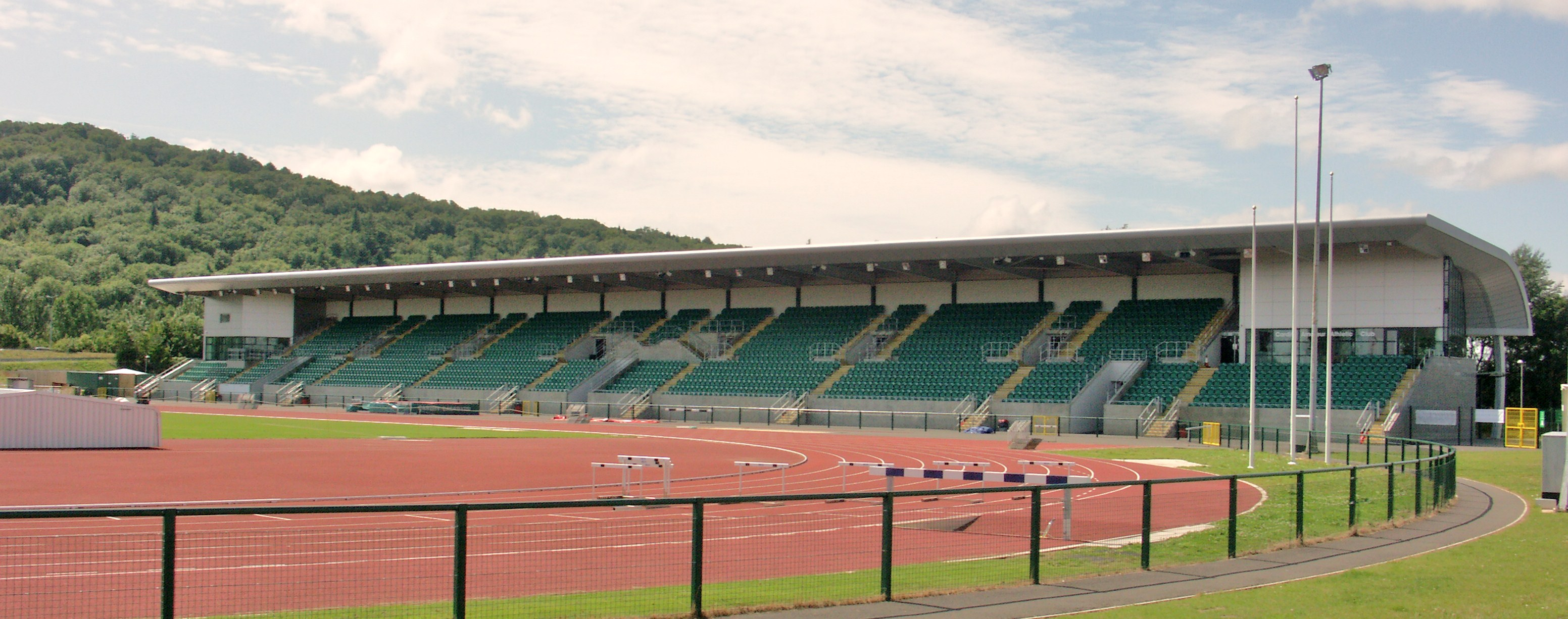
- Interactive map of Cardiff International Sports Campus
- Former names: Cardiff International Sports Stadium
- Location: Canton, Cardiff, Wales
- Coordinates: 51°28′23″N 3°12′36″W
- Owner: Cardiff Council
- Operator: Cardiff and Vale College and Cardiff City House of Sport
- Capacity: 4,953 (stadium seated: 2,553; standing: 2,400)
- Surface: Track & Field (Grass)

Construction
- Groundbreaking: March 2007
- Built: 2007–08
- Opened: 19 January 2009
- Cost: £5.7 million
- Main contractor: Cowlin

Tenants
- Welsh Athletics; Cardiff Amateur Athletic Club; Cardiff City F.C. Canton Liberal F.C. Canton RFC; Cardiff City House of Sport

Cardiff International Sports Campus (Welsh: Campws Chwaraeon Rhyngwladol Caerdydd), is an athletics stadium and playing fields in the Canton area of Cardiff, Wales.

The campus opened in 2009 as part of the major Leckwith Development, which included a new football and rugby stadium, Cardiff City Stadium, and a retail park.

In July 2015, Cardiff Council let the stadium and its grounds to Cardiff and Vale College, who further sublet the sports facilities to Cardiff City House of Sport. This lease runs for 30 years as a result of which the stadium is no longer open to the public during the day, although evening opening is unaffected.

== Development ==
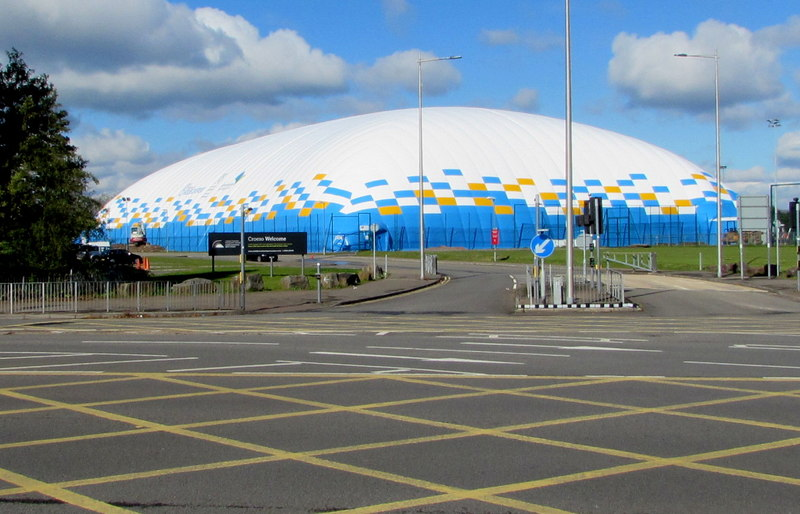
The Air Dome on the Cardiff International Sports Campus

The original completion date of the main stadium building and floodlighting of the running track was moved back from May 2008 to early September 2008.

The stadium has replaced the older Cardiff Athletics Stadium, which has been demolished as part of the overall Leckwith development, which includes the Cardiff City Stadium.

The £5.7million project took 46 weeks to build.

== Official opening ==
The official opening of Cardiff International Sports Campus was on 19 January 2009, attended by former Welsh athletics star Colin Jackson.

== Facilities ==
Stadium capacity is 4,953; 2,553 seated and 2,400 standing.

The stadium includes a gym, AstroTurf pitches, meeting rooms, and offices. It also includes the headquarters of Welsh Athletics—the sport's governing body for Wales—and Cardiff Amateur Athletic Club.

== History ==
In 2015 Cardiff Council approved a proposal put forward by Cardiff and Vale College and the Cardiff City House of Sport to lease Cardiff International Sports Campus.

The venue has hosted football matches, including the home fixtures of Barry Town United and Cardiff Metropolitan University in 2019–20 UEFA Europa League qualifying.

== See also ==
- Sport in Cardiff
