= Blue discography =

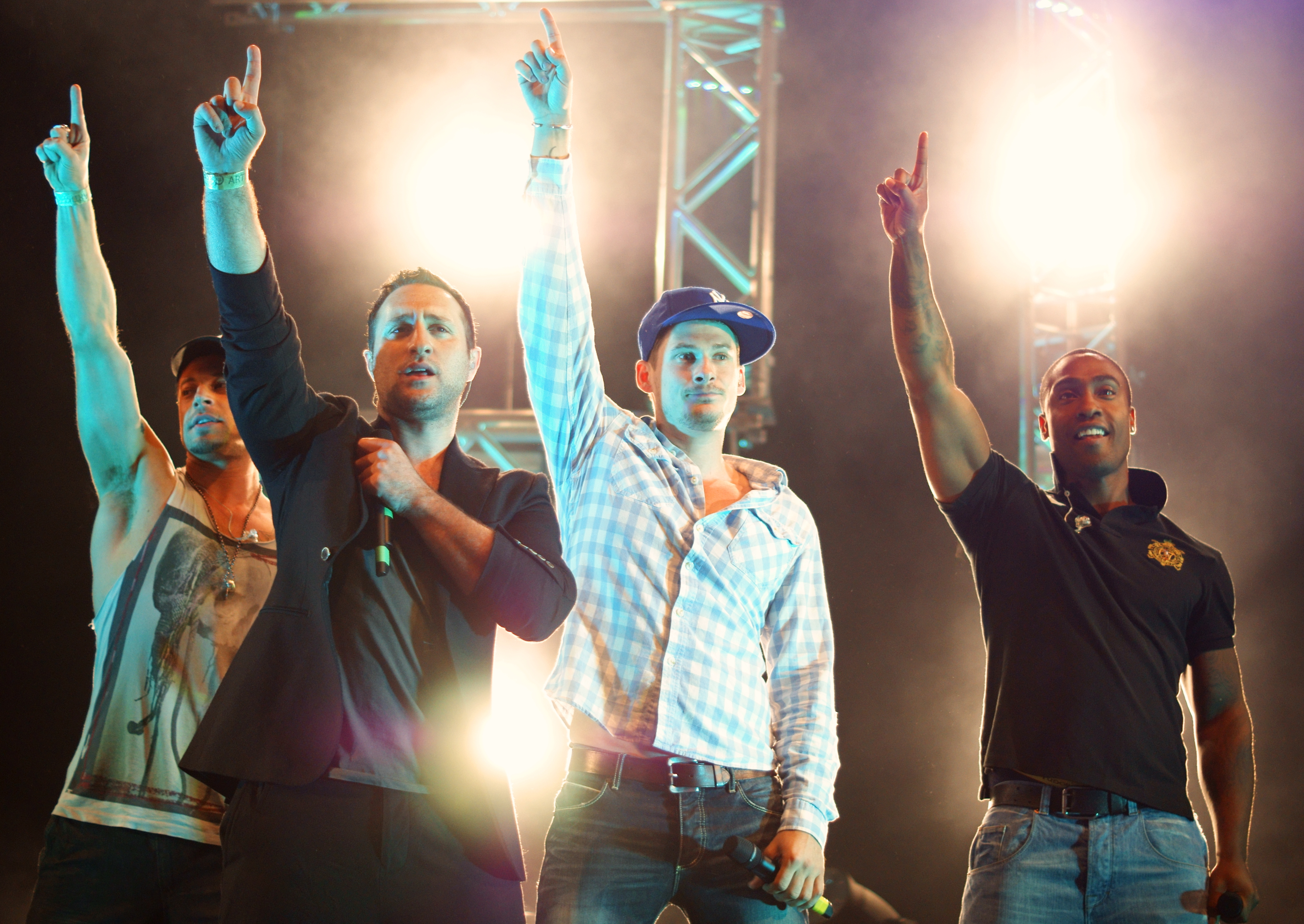
- Blue performing in Manchester in 2011 (From left to right: Duncan James, Antony Costa, Lee Ryan and Simon Webbe)
- Studio albums: 7
- Extended plays: 1
- Live albums: 2
- Compilation albums: 6
- Singles: 34
- Video albums: 5
- Music videos: 32
- Promotional singles: 2
- Remix albums: 1

Blue are an English boy band, consisting of members Simon Webbe, Duncan James, Antony Costa, and Lee Ryan. Their discography includes seven studio albums, five compilation albums, one remix album and 34 singles and 32 music videos. Interrupted by several creative breaks, Blue have sold more than 16 million records worldwide since their formation. According to the British Phonographic Industry (BPI), the band has been certified for 3.6 million albums and 2.6 million singles in the UK.

The band originally formed in 2000 and released their debut single "All Rise" through Innocent and Virgin Records in May 2001. The song became a top five hit in several countries, peaking at number four on the UK Singles Chart and reaching number one in New Zealand. Follow-up single "Too Close", a cover of the same-titled Next song, was released in August 2001 and marked Blue's first chart topper in the UK and second in New Zealand, with third single "If You Come Back" becoming their third number one hit in the UK. The band's debut album All Rise, released in November 2001, peaked at number one the UK Albums Chart enjoyed top-ten success throughout Europe and Oceania. Certified 4× Platinum in the UK, the album sold in excess of 1.3 million copies domestically.

One Love, Blue's second album, was released in November 2002. Preceded by its top-five title track, the album broke into several previously untapped markets based upon the success of its second single "Sorry Seems to Be the Hardest Word", a cover of the Elton John song featuring John himself. The song became the band's highest-charting single to date, reaching number one in both the Netherlands and the UK. A steady seller, One Love also was certified 4× Platinum in the UK with domestic sales of more than 1.2 million units. While it did not match its predecessor's success in Oceania, One Love sold nearly twice as well across Europe, where it reached 2× Platinum status.

In November 2003, Blue released their studio album Guilty (2003). It debuted at number one on the UK Album Chart after its release, and was eventually certified 2× Platinum, selling roughly half as much as its two predecessors. The album's title track, became the band's first chart topper in Denmark and peaked at number two on the UK Singles Chart, though "Breathe Easy" emerged as the album's biggest-selling single and marked their first number-one hit in Italy. In late 2004, Blue announced that they would disband indefinitely. This coincided with the release of their first compilation album, Best of Blue, released in November 2004. The album produced the single "Curtain Falls" which peaked at number two in Italy, number four in the United Kingdom, and number eight in Germany.

In May 2011, following their reformation in April 2009, Blue represented the United Kingdom at Eurovision with the song "I Can". Their first single in six years, the song peaked at number sixteen on the UK Singles Chart, and reached the top ten in Germany, Austria and Switzerland. In January 2013, Blue released their fourth studio album, Roulette, their first project with Island Records. Although the album failed to match the major success of their earlier releases, it still reached the top 20 on the charts in both Germany and the United Kingdom. Roulette’s lead single, "Hurt Lovers", became a top-ten hit on the German Singles Chart. Blue signed with Sony Music to release their fifth album Colours in March 2015. An album consisting of six original songs and four cover versions, it opened and peaked at number 13 on the UK Albums Chart but due to disappointing sales figures, resulted in them being released early from their two-album contract with the label.

In 2022, Blue returned with singles "Haven't Found You Yet" and a cover of 112's 2001 song "Dance with Me", both from their sixth studio album Heart & Soul. Their first project in seven years, the album was released in October 2022 through Tag8 and BMG. It debuted and peaked at number 22 on the UK Albums Chart, becoming Blue's lowest yet, while still reaching number four on the UK Independent Albums Chart and number 18 in Scotland. In May 2024, the band released the standalone single "My City". Reflections, Blue's seventh studio album, was released on 9 January 2026 through Blue Blood International and Cooking Vinyl. It debuted at number two on the UK Albums Chart, becoming the group's highest charting studio album since Guilty, and additionally topped the Scottish Albums Chart, becoming the band's first album to reach number one there.

== Albums ==
=== Studio albums ===
List of studio albums, with selected chart positions and certifications
Title	Album details	Peak chart positions										Certifications
Title	Album details	UK	AUS	AUT	BEL	GER	IRE	ITA	JPN	SCO	SWI	Certifications
All Rise	Released: 26 November 2001; Label: Innocent; Formats: CD, cassette	1	31	—	4	68	5	—	—	6	—	BPI: 4× Platinum; ARIA: Gold; IFPI EUR: Platinum; RMNZ: 2× Platinum
One Love	Released: 4 November 2002; Label: Innocent; Formats: CD, cassette	1	61	19	23	15	5	10	9	2	31	BPI: 4× Platinum; BVMI: Gold; IFPI EUR: 2× Platinum; FIMI: Gold; RMNZ: Gold; IFPI SWI: Gold
Guilty	Released: 3 November 2003; Label: Innocent; Formats: CD, cassette	1	93	13	24	8	9	7	4	3	12	BPI: 2× Platinum; BVMI: Gold; IFPI EUR: Platinum; FIMI: 2× Platinum; IFPI SWI: Gold
Roulette	Released: 28 April 2013; Label: Blueworld, Island; Formats: CD, digital download	13	—	30	—	14	90	32	192	21	31	
Colours	Released: 6 March 2015; Label: Sony Music; Formats: CD, digital download	13	—	—	—	—	—	—	96	21	—	
Heart & Soul	Released: 28 October 2022; Label: Tag8, BMG; Formats: CD, cassette, vinyl, digital download	22	—	—	44	—	—	—	—	18	—	
Reflections	Released: 9 January 2026; Label: Cooking Vinyl; Formats: CD, cassette, vinyl, digital download	2	—	—	16	—	—	—	—	1	77	
"—" denotes releases that did not chart or were not released in that territory.

=== Live albums ===
List of live albums
Title	Album details
Guilty Live Tour / One Love Live Tour	Released: 1 November 2004; Format: CD, digital download; Label: Innocent
The Roulette Tour	Released: 18 November 2013; Format: CD, digital download; Label: Island

=== Compilation albums ===
List of compilation albums, with selected chart positions and certifications
Title	Album details	Peak chart positions										Certifications
Title	Album details	UK	AUT	BEL	GER	IRE	ITA	JPN	NL	NZ	SWI	Certifications
Remixes	Released: 28 January 2004 (Japan); Label: EMI; Format: CD, cassette	—	—	—	—	—	—	64	—	—	—	
Best of Blue	Released: 13 November 2004; Label: Innocent; Formats: CD, digital download	6	11	37	7	26	1	14	72	25	8	BPI: 2× Platinum; BVMI: Gold; IFPI EUR: Platinum; FIMI: 4× Platinum; IFPI SWI: Gold
4Ever Blue	Released: 8 May 2005; Label: Virgin; Formats: CD, digital download	—	—	—	40	—	1	83	—	—	80	FIMI: Platinum
The Platinum Collection	Released: 24 February 2006 (Italy); Label: Virgin; Formats: 3× CD, digital download	—	—	—	—	—	35	—	—	—	—	
The Collection	Released: 31 August 2007; Label: EMI; Formats: CD, digital download	—	—	—	—	—	—	—	—	—	—	
Ultimate Blue	Released: 14 May 2012; Label: Music Club; Formats: 2×CD, digital download	—	—	—	—	—	—	—	—	—	—	
Royal: The First Twenty Years	Released: 14 July 2021 (Japan); Label: Universal Music; Formats: CD, digital download	—	—	—	—	—	—	—	—	—	—	
"—" denotes releases that did not chart or were not released in that territory.

=== Video albums ===
List of video albums, with selected chart positions
Title	Album details	Peak		Certifications	Notes
Title	Album details	UK	JPN	Certifications	Notes
A Year in the Life of Blue	Released: 25 March 2002; Label: Virgin; Format: DVD	1	70	BPI: Platinum	An "access all areas" documentary of the boys rise to fame. Also includes footage of the band's promotional tour of Singapore.
One Love: Live Tour	Released: 31 March 2003; Label: Virgin; Format: DVD	2	50	BPI: Platinum	Live concert filmed at the Sheffield Arena, in 2002.
Close to Blue	Released: 1 December 2003; Label: Virgin; Format: DVD	4	77		Special live show recorded in front of an invited audience of lucky fans. Documentary following the boys to Paris and Los Angeles.
Guilty: Live from Wembley	Released: 26 March 2004; Label: Virgin; Format: DVD	1	59		Concert at Wembley Stadium, London.
Best of Blue	Released: 15 November 2004; Label: EMI; Format: DVD	—	46		All music videos. Also features an exclusive interview.
"—" denotes releases that did not chart or were not released in that territory.

== Extended plays ==
List of extended plays (EPs)
Title	EP details
Roulette Summer Edition	Released: 2 September 2013; Format: Digital download; Label: GmbH

== Singles ==
=== As lead artist ===
List of singles, with selected chart positions and certifications
Title	Year	Peak chart positions										Certifications	Album
Title	Year	UK	AUS	AUT	BEL	GER	IRE	ITA	NL	NZ	SWI	Certifications	Album
"All Rise"	2001	4	3	15	2	19	15	—	70	1	22	BPI: Platinum; ARIA: Platinum; BEA: Gold	All Rise
"Too Close"	2001	1	5	72	6	66	17	—	—	1	—	BPI: Silver; ARIA: Platinum	All Rise
"If You Come Back"	2001	1	19	49	9	48	13	—	—	5	71	BPI: Gold	All Rise
"Fly By II"	2002	6	26	65	23	45	16	—	58	9	65	BPI: Silver	All Rise
"Best in Me"	2002	—	—	—	—	—	—	—	—	10	—		All Rise
"One Love"	2002	3	36	53	24	54	4	9	41	5	44	BPI: Gold; RMNZ: Gold	One Love
"Sorry Seems to Be the Hardest Word" (featuring Elton John)	2002	1	43	4	3	4	3	4	1	5	3	BPI: Gold; BEA: Gold; IFPI SWI: Gold; RMNZ: Gold	One Love
"U Make Me Wanna"	2003	4	—	10	14	6	5	19	22	20	9	BPI: Silver; BVMI: Gold	One Love
"Guilty"	2003	2	29	20	19	19	4	6	11	14	22		Guilty
"Signed, Sealed, Delivered, I'm Yours" (featuring Stevie Wonder and Angie Stone)	2003	11	31	35	38	29	17	11	16	22	53		Guilty
"Breathe Easy"	2004	4	—	7	28	7	4	1	21	29	8	BPI: Silver; BVMI: Gold	Guilty
"Bubblin'" (featuring Linkup)	2004	9	—	27	34	11	21	3	36	—	8		Guilty
"Curtain Falls"	2004	4	—	16	20	8	10	2	37	—	13		Best of Blue
"Get Down on It" (featuring Kool & the Gang and Lil' Kim)	2005	—	—	41	24	29	47	—	96	—	35		Best of Blue
"Only Words I Know"	2005	—	—	—	—	55	—	2	—	—	—		Best of Blue
"I Can"	2011	16	—	8	67	7	34	—	—	—	8		Roulette
"Hurt Lovers"	2013	70	—	27	139	7	—	—	—	—	22		Roulette
"Without You"/"Break My Heart"	2013	—	—	—	—	44	—	—	—	—	43		Roulette
"Broken"/"Ayo"	2014	—	—	—	—	—	—	—	—	—	—		Roulette
"King of the World"	2015	—	—	—	—	—	—	—	—	—	—		Colours
"Nothing Like You"	2015	—	—	—	—	—	—	—	—	—	—		Colours
"Haven't Found You Yet"	2022	— (Note: "Haven't Found You Yet" did not enter the UK Singles Chart, but peaked at number 61 on the UK Singles Downloads Chart.)	—	—	—	—	—	—	—	—	—		Heart & Soul
"Dance with Me"	2022	—	—	—	—	—	—	—	—	—	—		Heart & Soul
"Magnetic"	2022	—	—	—	—	—	—	—	—	—	—		Heart & Soul
"Heart & Soul"	2022	—	—	—	—	—	—	—	—	—	—		Heart & Soul
"My City"	2024	—	—	—	—	—	—	—	—	—	—		Non-album single
"One Last Time"	2025	— (Note: "One Last Time" did not enter the UK Singles Chart, but peaked at number 62 on the UK Singles Chart.)	—	—	—	—	—	—	—	—	—		Reflections
"Waste My Love"	2025	—	—	—	—	—	—	—	—	—	—		Reflections
"Beautiful Spiritual"	2025	—	—	—	—	—	—	—	—	—	—		Reflections
"Candlelight Fades"	2025	—	—	—	—	—	—	—	—	—	—		Reflections
"Flowers"	2026	—	—	—	—	—	—	—	—	—	—		Non-album single
"You Should Know"	2026	— (Note: "You Should Know" did not enter the UK Singles Chart, but peaked at number 11 on the UK Physical Singles Chart.)	—	—	—	—	—	—	—	—	—		Reflections
"—" denotes releases that did not chart or were not released in that territory.

=== As featured artist ===
List of singles, with selected chart positions
Title	Year	Peak chart positions		Album
Title	Year	UK	IRE	Album
"U Make Me Wanna" (Elva Hsiao featuring Blue)	2003	—	—	Theme Song of Love, Kissing
"I Wish It Could Be Christmas Everyday" (among The Big Reunion cast)	2013	21	82	Non-album singles
"With a Little Help from My Friends" (among NHS Voices)	2018	89	—	Non-album singles
"—" denotes releases that did not chart or were not released in that territory.

=== Promotional singles ===
List of singles, with selected chart positions
Title	Year	Peak	Album
Title	Year	JPN	Album
"Supersexual"	2003	—	One Love
"The Gift"	2004	122	Guilty
"—" denotes releases that did not chart or were not released in that territory.

== Other appearances ==
List of other album appearances
Title	Year	Other artist	Album
"Get Ready"	2002	—N/a	Party at the Palace
"You Can Leave Your Hat On"	2002	Tom Jones	Party at the Palace

== Music videos ==
List of music videos, showing year released and director
Title	Year	Director
"All Rise"	2001	Andy Morahan
"Too Close"	2001	Jake Nava
"If You Come Back"	2001	Si & Ad
"If You Come Back" (version II)	2001	Si & Ad
"Fly By II"	2002	Jake Nava
"Best in Me"	2002	Si & Ad
"One Love"	2002	Cameron Casey
"Sorry Seems to Be the Hardest Word" (featuring Elton John)	2002	Max & Dania
"U Make Me Wanna"	2003	Phil Griffin
"U Make Me Wanna" (with Elva Hsiao)	2003	Unknown
"Supersexual"	2003	Unknown
"One Love: The Sequel"	2003	Unknown
"Don't Treat Me Like a Fool"	2003	Unknown
"Guilty"	2003	David Mould
"Signed, Sealed, Delivered, I'm Yours" (featuring Stevie Wonder and Angie Stone)	2003	Max & Dania
"The Gift"	2004	Unknown
"Breathe Easy"	2004	Cameron Casey
"A Chi Mi Dice"	2004	Cameron Casey and Lee Ryan
"Bubblin'"	2004	Alex DeRakoff
"You & Me Bubblin'" (with Linkup)	2004	Tarik Hamdine
"Curtain Falls"	2004	Justin Dickel
"Get Down on It" (featuring Kool & the Gang and Lil' Kim)	2005	Unknown
"Only Words I Know"	2005	Unknown
"I Can"	2011	Unknown
"Hurt Lovers" (International version)	2013	Katja Kuhl
"Hurt Lovers" (UK version)	2013	Katja Kuhl
"Without You"	2013	Lennart Brede
"Break My Heart"	2013	Harvey Bertram-Brown
"Broken"	2013	Unknown
"King of the World"	2015	Phil Griffin
"Haven't Found You Yet"	2022	Jackson Ducasse
"One Last Time"	2025	Matt Evers
