= The Platinum Collection (Blue album) =

Compilation album by Blue
- Released: 24 April 2006
- Recorded: 2001–2005
- Genre: Pop/R&B
- Label: Innocent

Blue chronology
4Ever Blue (2005)	The Platinum Collection (2006)	The Collection (2007)

The Platinum Collection is the third greatest hits/compilation album released by English boy-band Blue. The album was released in some European countries, such as France and Germany, in June 2006. The compilation was put together and released by EMI Music. The album peaked at #35 in Italian chart.

== Track listing ==
Disc 1
The Greatest Tracks

1. "Back Some Day" - 4:00
2. "Make It Happen" - 3:14
3. "Girl I'll Never Understand" - 3:26
4. "Long Time" - 4:14
5. "Made for Loving You" - 3:25
6. "Elements" - 3:40
7. "The Gift" - 4:50
8. "Flexin'" - 4:02
9. "Ain't Got You" - 4:33
10. "Stand Up" - 3:38
11. "Taste It" - 3:33
12. "When Summer's Gone" - 4:11
13. "Alive" - 3:39
14. "Walk Away" - 4:39
15. "How's a Man Supposed to Change?" - 4:04
16. "No Goodbyes" - 3:57

Disc 2
The Greatest Hits

1. "All Rise" - 3:43
2. "Too Close" - 3:45
3. "If You Come Back" - 3:27
4. "Fly By II" - 3:48
5. "One Love" - 3:33
6. "Sorry Seems To Be The Hardest Word" (featuring Elton John) - 3:41
7. "U Make Me Wanna" - 3:38
8. "Guilty" - 3:45
9. "Breathe Easy" - 4:36
10. "Bubblin'" (Feat. L.A.D.É) - 3:29
11. "Curtain Falls" - 4:04
12. "Get Down on It" (featuring Kool and the Gang & Lil' Kim) - 4:37
13. "Love at First Sight" - 3:58
14. "Best in Me" - 3:14
15. "Only Words I Know" - 3:57

Disc 3
Guilty: Live!

1. "Back to You" - 3:04
2. "Fly By" - 3:46
3. "Guilty" - 3:45
4. "Sorry Seems to Be The Hardest Word" - 3:41
5. "Rock The Night" - 3:21
6. "Bubblin'" - 3:05
7. "If You Come Back" - 3:27
8. "Breathe Easy" - 4:36
9. "Alive" - 3:39
10. "Jackson Medley" - 5:11
11. "U Make Me Wanna" - 3:38
12. "When Summer's Gone" - 4:11
13. "Taste It" - 3:33
14. "All Rise" - 3:43
15. "Too Close" - 3:45
16. "One Love" - 3:33

== Charts ==
Chart (2006)	Peak position
Italian Albums (FIMI)	35
