= Ultimate Blue =

Compilation album by Blue
- Released: 14 May 2012
- Recorded: 2001–2005
- Genres: Pop, R&B, dance, soul
- Length: 2:01:11
- Label: Music Club Deluxe
- Producers: Stargate, Supa'Flyas, Matt Rowe, Ray Ruffin, Jem Godfrey, Bill Padley, Deekay, True North, Martin Harrington, Ash Howes, Ian Levine, Clive Scott, Rob Davis, Cutfather & Joe

Blue chronology
The Collection (2007)	Ultimate Blue (2012)	Roulette (2013)

Ultimate Blue is the sixth compilation album to be released by British boy band Blue, released on 14 May 2012 in promotion of their fourth studio album, Roulette. The album includes all of the band's back catalogue of singles, bar "Signed, Sealed, Delivered, I'm Yours", as the band deemed it their least favourite single of all, as well as a number of popular album tracks, B-sides, as well as one or two tracks previously unreleased in the United Kingdom, such as "The Gift", which was only previously available in Japan, and "Welcome to the Show", which was only previously available on the European release 4Ever Blue. The album is one of a number of releases in the Ultimate series, with other artists such as Atomic Kitten and East 17 also issuing albums under the Music Club Deluxe label.

== Track listing ==
Disc 1
No.	Title	Writer(s)	Producer(s)	Length
1.	"All Rise"	Webbe, Stephens, Eriksen, Hermansen, Rustan	Stargate	3:43
2.	"U Make Me Wanna"	McLaughlin, Wilkins, Robson	Stargate	3:38
3.	"One Love"	Costa, James, Ryan, Webbe, Eriksen, Hermansen, Rustan	Stargate	3:33
4.	"Get Down on It" (featuring Kool & The Gang and Lil' Kim)	Bell, Taylor, Brown, Hickens, Nash, Giftens, Thomas, Smith, West	Stargate	3:54
5.	"Sweet Thing"	Webbe, Sharpe, Robbins, Tennant	Supa'Flyas	3:38
6.	"Fly By II"	Webbe, Eriksen, Hermansen, Rustan	Stargate	3:46
7.	"Bounce"	Webbe, Eriksen, Hermansen, Rustan	Stargate	3:52
8.	"Rock the Night"	Costa, Rowe, Solomon	Rowe	3:21
9.	"If You Come Back"	Formescu, Brennan, Ruffin, Hope	Ruffin	3:27
10.	"Sorry Seems to Be the Hardest Word" (featuring Elton John)	John, Taupin	Stargate	3:41
11.	"Best in Me"	Padley, Godfrey	Padley, Godfrey	3:11
12.	"Breathe Easy"	Ryan, Jensen, Larsson	Deekay	4:36
13.	"The Gift"	Makihara	Deekay	4:55
14.	"Guilty"	James, Barlow, Kennedy, Woodcock	True North	3:45
15.	"Curtain Falls"	Costa, James, Ryan, Webbe, Eriksen, Hermansen, Rustan, DJ Wonder	Stargate	4:02

Disc 2
No.	Title	Writer(s)	Producer(s)	Length
1.	"Taste It"	James, Barlow, Kennedy, Woodcock	True North	3:33
2.	"Get Ready"	Robinson	Levine, Scott	3:23
3.	"I Wanna Know"	Costa, James, Bähncke, Tromborg, Butler, Dixon	Supa'Flyas	3:38
4.	"Welcome to the Show"	Costa, James, Ryan, Webbe, Eriksen, Hermansen, Rustan	Stargate	3:30
5.	"Bubblin'" (featuring LADE)	Costa, Jensen, Jørgensen, Tennant	Deekay	3:05
6.	"Love R.I.P."	Padley, Godfrey	Padley, Godfrey	3:39
7.	"Right Here Waiting"	Davis, Harrington, Howes	Davis, Harrington, Howes	3:30
8.	"Too Close"	Gist, Lighty, Huggar, Brown, Ford, Miller, Moore, Walker, Smith	Ruffin	3:45
9.	"4 Play"	Webbe, James	Stargate	3:24
10.	"Alive"	Costa, James, Ryan, Webbe, Eriksen, Hermansen, Rustan	Stargate	3:39
11.	"Supersexual"	Costa, James, Ryan, Webbe, Barlow, Kennedy, Woodcock	True North	3:40
12.	"Made for Loving You"	Costa, James, Ryan, Webbe, Barlow, Kennedy, Woodcock	True North	3:25
13.	"Love at First Sight"	Costa, James, Ryan, Webbe, Eriksen, Hermansen, Rustan	Stargate	3:16
14.	"Flexin'"	Dawood, Hansen, Belmaati, Webbe	Cutfather & Joe	4:02
15.	"When Summer's Gone"	Costa, James, Ryan, Webbe, Eriksen, Hermansen, Rustan	Stargate	4:11

== Release history ==
Regions	Dates	Format(s)	Label(s)
Ireland	11 May 2012	2CD, digital download	Music Club Deluxe
United Kingdom	14 May 2012	2CD, digital download	Music Club Deluxe
