= Best of Blue =

Compilation album by Blue
- Released: 15 November 2004
- Recorded: 2000–2004
- Genre: Pop
- Length: 53:04
- Label: Innocent

Blue chronology
Remixes - Japan Tour Mini Album (2004)	Best of Blue (2004)	4Ever Blue (2005)

Alternative cover
- Special limited fans edition cover

Singles from Best of Blue
- 1. "Curtain Falls" Released: 8 November 2004; 2. "Get Down on It" Released: 2 February 2005; 3. "Only Words I Know" Released: 13 June 2005

Best of Blue is the first greatest hits compilation album released by English boy band Blue. The album was released in the United Kingdom on 15 November 2004, by Innocent Records. It was due to be supported by a European tour of the same name, but this was cancelled in February 2005.

== Singles ==
- "Curtain Falls" — The debut single, released in November 2004. The single peaked at No. 4 on the UK Singles Chart, No. 3 on the Australian Top 40, at No. 1 in New Zealand and No. 5 in Ireland. The song has received a Silver sales status certification for sales of over 200,000 copies in the UK. It was the only song from the album released as an official single in the UK.
- "Get Down on It" — The second single, released in January 2005. The song was released across Europe, except in the UK for unknown reasons. The song is a cover version of Kool & the Gang's number one hit and features instruments by Kool & The Gang, as well as vocals from Lil' Kim. The single peaked at No. 5 on the Australian and No. 1 in New Zealand.
- "Only Words I Know" — The third single, released in June 2005 only in Germany and Italy. The song wasn't released in the United Kingdom or other countries. The single was used to promote the release of the group's second greatest hits compilation, 4Ever Blue.

== Critical reception ==
Professional ratings
Review scores
Source	Rating
The Guardian	3/5 stars
Yahoo! Music UK	6/10

Caroline Sullivan from The Guardian found that the "compilation attests to the fact that they were a cut above the average pec-flexing hunks. They produced some decent boy-pop, and one indisputable classic, the 2001 debut "All Rise." [...] Having hit on a distinctive minor-chord sound, they stuck with it for most of their dozen hits, which are arranged chronologically. But if they never strayed far from their signature layered vocals, neither did they cheat with endless cover versions or pad things out with ballads." BBC Music editor Roger Kerrison wrote: "As a commemoration of their short career this collection of hits sounds similar to many other artists who have superseded them. So perhaps it is prudent that they are calling it a day and heading for the great yonder." He found that the "stand out songs include "Signed, Sealed Delivered, I'm Yours" and "Get Down On It". Both will no doubt be floor fillers at weddings for years to come. Unfortunately there is little else on the Best of Blue which will stand the test of time: even "Sorry Seems to be the Hardest Word," recorded with the ultra credible Sir Elton fails to light the touch paper. And the more upbeat "Bubblin'", which is one of their better self-penned tracks, there is a feeling that the production lacks that extra little spark."

== Track listing ==
Best of Blue track listing
No.	Title	Writer(s)	Producer(s)	Length
1.	"All Rise" (from All Rise)	Simon WebbeMikkel S. Eriksen; Tor Erik Hermansen; Hallgeir Rustan; Daniel Stephens	Stargate	3:43
2.	"Too Close" (from All Rise)	Kier Gist; Darren Lighty; Robert Huggar; Raphael Brown; Robert Ford Jr.; Denzil Miller; James B. Moore; Kurtis Walker; Larry Smith	Ray Ruffin	3:45
3.	"If You Come Back" (from All Rise)	Ruffin; Nicole Formescu; Lee Brennan; Ian Hope	Ruffin	3:27
4.	"Fly by II" (from All Rise)	Webbe; Eriksen; Hermansen; Rustan	Stargate	3:46
5.	"One Love" (from One Love)	Antony Costa; Duncan James; Lee Ryan; Webbe; Eriksen; Hermansen; Rustan	Stargate	3:33
6.	"Sorry Seems to Be the Hardest Word" (featuring Elton John) (from One Love)	John; Bernie Taupin	Stargate	3:41
7.	"U Make Me Wanna" (from One Love)	John McLaughlin; Harry Wilkins; Steve Robson	Stargate	3:38
8.	"Guilty" (from Guilty)	James; Gary Barlow; Eliot Kennedy; Tim Woodcock	True North; Martin Harrington; Ash Howes	3:45
9.	"Signed, Sealed, Delivered I'm Yours" (featuring Stevie Wonder and Angie Stone) (from Guilty)	Wonder; Lee Garrett; Syreeta Wright; Lula Mae Hardaway	Harrington; Howes	3:33
10.	"Breathe Easy" (from Guilty)	Ryan; Lars Halvor Jensen; Martin M. Larsson	Deekay	4:36
11.	"Bubblin'" (from Guilty)	Costa; Jensen; Johannes Jørgensen; Ali Tennant	Deekay	3:05
12.	"Curtain Falls"	Costa; James; Ryan; Webbe; Hermansen; DJ Wonder; Eriksen; Hermansen; Rustan	StarGate	4:02
13.	"Get Down on It" (featuring Kool & The Gang and Lil'Kim)	Khalis Bayyan; James "J.T." Taylor; Kool & the Gang; Leigh Guest	Bayyan; Guest; Damien Egan; Deekay^{[a]}	3:54
14.	"Love at First Sight"			3:58
15.	"Best in Me" (2004 Version) (from All Rise)	Jem Godfrey; Bill Padley	Godfrey; Padley	3:13

Italian Alternative Track
No.	Title	Writer(s)	Producer(s)	Length
14.	"Only Words I Know" (Italian version)	Costa; James; Ryan; Webbe; Eriksen; Hermansen; Rustan	Stargate	3:36

Japanese bonus tracks
No.	Title	Writer(s)	Producer(s)	Length
16.	"The Gift"	Noriyuki Makihara	Deekay	4:55
17.	"It's Alright"	Costa; Ryan; Jensen; Tennant	Deekay	3:33

Taiwanese bonus track
No.	Title	Writer(s)	Producer(s)	Length
18.	"One Love: The Sequel"	Costa; James; Ryan; Webbe; Hermansen; Eriksen; Hermansen; Rustan	Stargate; Ian Widgery	3:46

Limited edition fans' edition bonus disc
No.	Title	Writer(s)	Producer(s)	Length
1.	"If It Takes All Night"			3:26
2.	"After the Show"			3:31
3.	"Only Words I Know"	Costa; James; Ryan; Webbe; Hermansen; Eriksen; Hermansen; Rustan	Stargate	3:38
4.	"Long Time" (Smooth Mix)	Costa; Webbe; Formescu; Ruffin; Hope	Ray Ruffin	4:37
5.	"When Summer's Gone" (Live from Riverside) (Video)	Costa; James; Ryan; Webbe; Hermansen; Eriksen; Hermansen; Rustan	Stargate	4:11
6.	"The Blue Journey" (Documentary)
7.	"If You Come Back" (8 Jam Street Mix)	Formescu; Lee Brennan; Ruffin; Hope	Ruffin; Pete Craigie	3:27

Notes

- ^{^[a]} signifies a remix producer

== Tour ==
Date	City	Country	Venue
Best of Blue Tour:
25 June 2005	Sheffield	England	Hallam FM Arena
26 June 2005	Manchester	England	Manchester Evening News Arena
27 June 2005	Manchester	England	Manchester Evening News Arena
29 June 2005	Nottingham	England	Nottingham Arena
30 June 2005	Birmingham	England	NEC Arena
1 July 2005	Birmingham	England	NEC Arena
3 July 2005	Glasgow	Scotland	Scottish Exhibition and Conference Centre
4 July 2005	Glasgow	Scotland	Scottish Exhibition and Conference Centre
5 July 2005	Newcastle	England	Metro Radio Arena
7 July 2005	London	England	Wembley Arena
8 July 2005	London	England	Wembley Arena
9 July 2005	London	England	Wembley Arena

== Charts ==
=== Weekly charts ===
Weekly chart performance for Best of Blue
Chart (2004–05)	Peak position
Austrian Albums (Ö3 Austria)	11
Belgian Albums (Ultratop Flanders)	37
Belgian Albums (Ultratop Wallonia)	76
Danish Albums (Hitlisten)	9
Dutch Albums (Album Top 100)	72
European Albums (Billboard)	6
French Albums (SNEP)	5
German Albums (Offizielle Top 100)	7
Greek Albums (IFPI)	4
Irish Albums (IRMA)	26
Italian Albums (FIMI)	1
Italian Albums (Musica e Dischi)	1
Japanese Albums (Oricon)	14
New Zealand Albums (RMNZ)	25
Norwegian Albums (VG-lista)	11
Portuguese Albums (AFP)	2
Scottish Albums (Official Charts)	12
Singaporean Albums (RIAS)	9
Spanish Albums (PROMUSICAE)	88
Swiss Albums (Schweizer Hitparade)	8
Taiwan Albums (G-Music)	1
UK Albums (Official Charts)	6

=== Year-end charts ===
2004 year-end chart performance for Best of Blue
Chart (2004)	Position
UK Albums (OCC)	37

2005 year-end chart performance for Best of Blue
Chart (2005)	Position
European Albums (Billboard)	42
Italian Albums (FIMI)	9
Swiss Albums (Schweizer Hitparade)	49

== Certifications and sales ==
Certifications of Best of Blue, with sales where available
Region	Certification	Certified units/sales
Denmark (IFPI Danmark)	Gold	20,000^{^}
Germany (BVMI)	Gold	100,000^{^}
Italy (FIMI)	4× Platinum	400,000^{*}
Portugal (AFP)	2× Platinum	80,000^{^}
South Korea (RIAK)	—	6,118
Switzerland (IFPI Switzerland)	Gold	20,000^{^}
United Kingdom (BPI)	2× Platinum	600,000^{‡}
Summaries
Europe (IFPI)	Platinum	1,000,000^{*}
^{*} Sales figures based on certification alone.^{^} Shipments figures based on certification alone.^{‡} Sales+streaming figures based on certification alone.
