= 4ever Blue =

4Ever Blue

Compilation album by Blue
- Released: 7 June 2005; 21 years ago
- Recorded: 2001–2005
- Genres: Pop, R&B
- Length: 75:22
- Label: Virgin
- Producers: Simon Webbe, Antony Costa.

Blue chronology
Best of Blue (2004)	4Ever Blue (2005)	The Platinum Collection (2006)

4Ever Blue is the second compilation album by British boyband Blue.

== Background ==
Following the release of Best of Blue, band members Simon Webbe and Antony Costa made the decision to release an album compiling a selection of the group's b-sides, remixes and previously unreleased material. The album also includes three tracks only previously in Japan: "The Gift", "It's Alright" and "Elements". The album also includes band member Duncan James' debut solo single, "I Believe My Heart". By the indication of the album booklet, a live version of "Lonely This Christmas" from CD:UK was intended to be track seven on the album, however, was removed from the track listing for unknown reasons. The album was released in July 2005, becoming available in several European countries, as well as Japan, Thailand and China, however, charting only in Japan at #83. The album was not released in the UK, despite copies being widely available.

== Track listing ==
No.	Title	Previous Appearance	Length
1.	"One Love" (Live Acappella) (Intro)	Previously Unreleased	0:40
2.	"Only Words I Know" (Italian Version)	"Only Words I Know" B-Side	3:36
3.	"Sweet Thing"	"Sorry Seems To Be The Hardest Word" B-Side	3:38
4.	"The Gift"	"Guilty" Japanese Version Bonus Track	4:50
5.	"Curtain Falls (Quand Le Rideau Tombe)" (French Version)	"Curtain Falls" French B-Side	4:03
6.	"Love R.I.P"	"Fly By II" B-Side	3:08
7.	"Get Ready"	"One Love" B-Side	3:23
8.	"All Rise" (Live on the Guilty Tour)	Previously Unreleased	3:42
9.	"Alive" (Live on the Guilty Tour)	Previously Unreleased	4:28
10.	"It's Alright"	"Best of Blue" Japanese Version Bonus Track	3:29
11.	"Get Down on It" (Obi & Josh Mix) (Feat. Kool & The Gang and Lil' Kim)	"Get Down on It" B-Side	4:01
12.	"Too Close" (Blacksmith R&B Club Rub)	"Too Close" B-Side	5:41
13.	"Elements"	"Guilty" Japanese Version Bonus Track	3:40
14.	"4 Play"	"Signed, Sealed, Delivered" B-Side	3:22
15.	"Made for Loving You"	"U Make Me Wanna" B-Side	3:25
16.	"Breathe Easy" (Love 4 Music Remix) (Feat. Jamie Summaz)	"Breathe Easy" B-Side	4:14
17.	"I Believe My Heart" (Duncan James Feat. Keedie)	"I Believe My Heart" Single	3:56

Fans Edition Bonus Disc
No.	Title	Previous Appearance	Length
1.	"Welcome to the Show"	"Get Down on It" B-Side	3:30
2.	"This Temptation" (Blacksmith R&B Club Rub)	"Fly By II" B-Side	4:31
3.	"Supersexual" (Pumpkin Dolls Radio Edit)	"Supersexual" B-Side	3:31
4.	"If You Come Back" (8 Jam Streetmix)	"If You Come Back" B-Side	4:56
5.	"Only Words I Know" (Video)		4:15
6.	"One Love" (TV Spot)		0:30
7.	"Guilty" (TV Spot)		0:30
8.	"Guilty" (Special Edition TV Spot)		0:30
9.	"Best of Blue" (TV Spot)		0:30

Japanese Bonus Tracks
No.	Title	Length
10.	"The Gift" (Video)	5:03
11.	"I Believe My Heart" (Video)	4:34
12.	"Best of Blue" (Special Edition TV Spot)	0:30

== Charts ==
Weekly chart performance for 4Ever
Chart (2005)	Peak position
German Albums (Offizielle Top 100)	40
Italian Albums (FIMI)	1
Italian Albums (Musica e Dischi)	1
Japanese Albums (Oricon)	83
Swiss Albums (Schweizer Hitparade)	80
Taiwanese Albums (G-Music)	1

== Certifications ==
Region	Certification	Certified units/sales
Italy (FIMI)	Platinum	120,000
South Korea	—	3680
