= Remixes – Japan Tour Mini Album =

Remixes - Japan Tour Mini Album

Remix album by Blue
- Released: (Japan) 28 January 2004
- Genre: Pop/Dance/R&B
- Label: EMI

Blue chronology
Guilty (2003)	Remixes - Japan Tour Mini Album (2004)	Best of Blue (2004)

Remixes – Japan Tour Mini Album is a remix album by English boy band Blue, released exclusively in Japan in January 2004. The album collects material featured on a selection of the band's singles, the majority of which not released in Japan.

== Track listing ==
1. "Fly By II" - 3:48
2. "Megamix" - 6:48
3. "U Make Me Wanna" (Urban North Edit) - 3:18
4. "All Rise" (Blacksmith RnB Club Rub) - 5:11
5. "If You Come Back" (The Playa's Mix) - 3:57
6. "Sorry Seems to Be the Hardest Word" (Ruffin Ready Soul Mix) - 3:51
7. "Love R.I.P" - 3:38
8. "If You Come Back" (8 Jam Street Mix) - 4:56
9. "Too Close" (Blacksmith RnB Club Rub) - 5:41
10. "If You Come Back" (Blacksmith Smooth RnB Rub) - 3:54
11. "All Rise" (Acoustic Version) - 3:40
12. "The Gift" (Music Video) - 5:02

== Charts ==
Chart performance for Remixes – Japan Tour Mini Album
Chart (2004)	Peak position
Japanese Albums (Oricon)	64
