= MTV Video Music Award Japan for Best Pop Video =

Annual Japanese music award

Best Pop Video (最優秀ポップビデオ賞)

== Results ==
The following table displays the nominees and the winners in bold print with a yellow background.

=== 2000s ===
Year	Artist	Video
**2002** (1st)	**Chemistry**	
**2002** (1st)	Backstreet Boys	
**2002** (1st)	Ayumi Hamasaki	
**2002** (1st)	Pink	
**2002** (1st)	Britney Spears	
**2003** (2nd)	**Blue**	**"One Love"**
**2003** (2nd)	BoA	"Valenti"
**2003** (2nd)	Ayumi Hamasaki	"Real Me"
**2003** (2nd)	Mr. Children	"Hero"
**2003** (2nd)	Justin Timberlake	"Like I Love You"
**2004** (3rd)	**Ayumi Hamasaki**	**"No Way to Say"**
**2004** (3rd)	Blue	"Guilty"
**2004** (3rd)	Ketsumeishi	"Natsu no Omoide" (夏の思い出)
**2004** (3rd)	Orange Range	"Shanghai Honey" (上海ハニー)
**2004** (3rd)	Outkast	"Hey Ya!"
**2005** (4th)	**Ketsumeishi**	**"Kimi ni Bump" (君に Bump)**
**2005** (4th)	Blue	"Curtain Falls"
**2005** (4th)	Exile	"Carry On"
**2005** (4th)	Gwen Stefani	"What You Waiting For?"
**2005** (4th)	Yuki	"Joy"
**2006** (5th)	**Remioromen**	**"Konayuki" (粉雪)**
**2006** (5th)	The Black Eyed Peas	"Don't Phunk With My Heart"
**2006** (5th)	Ayumi Hamasaki	"Fairyland"
**2006** (5th)	Kaela Kimura	"Rirura Riruha" (リルラ リルハ)
**2006** (5th)	Gwen Stefani	"Hollaback Girl"
**2007** (6th)	**Ai Otsuka**	**"Ren'ai Shashin" (恋愛写真)**
**2007** (6th)	Christina Aguilera	"Ain't No Other Man"
**2007** (6th)	Chemistry	"Yakusoku no Basho" (約束の場所)
**2007** (6th)	Rihanna	"SOS"
**2007** (6th)	Seamo	"See You Later" (マタアイマショウ)
**2008** (7th)	**Avril Lavigne**	**"Girlfriend"**
**2008** (7th)	Fergie	"Clumsy"
**2008** (7th)	M-Flo Loves Emi Hinouchi, Ryohei, Emyli, Yoshika and Lisa	"Love Comes and Goes"
**2008** (7th)	Ai Otsuka	"Peach"
**2008** (7th)	Yui	"Love & Truth"
**2009** (8th)	**Katy Perry**	**"I Kissed a Girl"**
**2009** (8th)	Lily Allen	"The Fear"
**2009** (8th)	Ikimono-gakari	"Kimagure Romantic" (気まぐれロマンティック)
**2009** (8th)	Perfume	"Dream Fighter"
**2009** (8th)	Rip Slyme	"Taiyou to Bikini" (太陽とビキニ)

=== 2010s ===
Year	Artist	Video
**2010** (9th)	**Big Bang**	**"Koe o Kikasete" (声をきかせて)**
**2010** (9th)	Ikimono-gakari	"Yell"
**2010** (9th)	Kumi Koda	"Lick Me"
**2010** (9th)	Leona Lewis	"Happy"
**2010** (9th)	Pink	"Please Don't Leave Me"
**2011** (10th)	**Ikimono-gakari**	**"Arigatō" (ありがとう)**
**2011** (10th)	Juju	"Kono Yoru o Tomete yo" (この夜を止めてよ)
**2011** (10th)	Katy Perry featuring Snoop Dogg	"California Gurls"
**2011** (10th)	Kana Nishino	"Kimi tte" (君って)
**2011** (10th)	Taylor Swift	"Mine"
**2012** (11th)	**Sandaime J Soul Brothers**	**"Fighters"**
**2012** (11th)	Namie Amuro	"Naked"
**2012** (11th)	Beyoncé	"Run the World (Girls)"
**2012** (11th)	Ikimono-gakari	"Itsudatte Bokura Wa" (いつだって僕らは)
**2012** (11th)	Rihanna featuring Calvin Harris	"We Found Love"
**2013** (12th)	Greeeen	"Orange" (オレンジ)
**2013** (12th)	Justin Bieber featuring Nicki Minaj	"Beauty and a Beat"
**2013** (12th)	Kyary Pamyu Pamyu	"Fashion Monster" (ファッションモンスター)
**2013** (12th)	Negoto	"Nameless"
**2013** (12th)	Taylor Swift	"We Are Never Ever Getting Back Together"

=== 2020s ===
Year	Artist	Video	Ref
**2021** (20th)	**milet**	**"Ordinary days"**	
**2025** (23rd)	**Nogizaka46**	**"Hodōkyō" (歩道橋)**	

== See also ==
- MTV Video Music Award for Best Pop Video
- MTV Europe Music Award for Best Pop
