= One Love (Blue album) =

Studio album by Blue
- Released: 4 November 2002
- Recorded: January–July 2002
- Studios: Los Angeles, United States; London, United Kingdom
- Genre: R&B
- Length: 53:41
- Labels: Virgin; Innocent
- Producers: Copenhaniacs; Cutfather & Joe; Rob Davis; Mark Hall; Martin Harrington; Ash Howes; Conner Reeves; Stargate; Supa'Flyas; John Themis; True North

Blue chronology
All Rise (2001)	One Love (2002)	Guilty (2003)

Singles from One Love
- 1. "One Love" Released: 21 October 2002; 2. "Sorry Seems to Be the Hardest Word" Released: 9 December 2002; 3. "U Make Me Wanna" Released: 17 March 2003; 4. "Supersexual" Released: 11 May 2003

One Love is the second studio album by English boy band Blue, released on 4 November 2002 in the United Kingdom and on 21 October 2003 in the United States. The album peaked at number one on the UK Albums Chart, where it stayed for one week. On 20 December 2003, it was certified 4× Platinum in the UK.

Three singles were released from the album: "One Love", which peaked at number three, "Sorry Seems to Be the Hardest Word", featuring Elton John, which peaked at number one, and "U Make Me Wanna", which peaked at number four.

== Singles ==
- "One Love" — The debut single, released in October 2002. The single peaked at No. 3 on the UK Singles Chart, No. 36 on the Australian Top 40, at No. 5 in New Zealand and No. 4 in Ireland. The song has received a Silver sales status certification for sales of over 200,000 copies in the UK.
- "Sorry Seems to Be the Hardest Word" — The second single, released in December 2002, featuring guest vocals from Elton John. The song is a cover version of Elton's number one hit. The single peaked at No. 1 on the UK Singles Chart, No. 43 on the Australian Top 100, No. 5 in New Zealand and No. 3 in Ireland. The song has received a Gold sales status certification for sales of over 500,000 copies in the UK.
- "U Make Me Wanna" — The third single, released in March 2003. The single peaked at No. 4 on the UK Singles Chart. The song was produced by multi-platinum producers StarGate & co-written by Steve Robson, John McLaughlin and Tom Wilkins. The song has sales of over 100,000 copies in the UK.
- "Supersexual" — Released as a single exclusively in Spain and South America in May 2003. The single peaked at No. 7 on the Spanish Singles Chart, becoming one of Blue's most successful singles in the region. A music video was recorded, featuring footage from the group's One Love tour.

== Critical reception ==
Professional ratings
Review scores
Source	Rating
AllMusic	3/5 stars
BBC Radio Suffolk	9/10 stars
Entertainment.ie	3/5 stars
The Guardian	3/5 stars
laut.de	2/5 stars

The Guardian critic Caroline Sullivan called the album "a decent showing from one of the less idiotic boy bands. She found that Blue's previous album All Rise "was such a sterling example of what thoughtful production can achieve in the boy-band genre that they can be excused for duplicating it across this album. The strategy essentially pays off, though half a dozen of the 15 tracks [...] could have been left on the cutting-room floor. Things amble along in a satisfyingly low-key way, with as much attention lavished on strong, soulful harmonies as laid-back R&B trimmings." BBC Radio Suffolk's Becky Betts found that Blue "have managed, to produce a very impressive diverse album with One Love [...] The album is varied, brilliant and packed with talent, just like an action packed film, it will keep you on the edge of your seat wondering what you're going to hear next."

Sharon Mawer from AllMusic rated the album three stars out of five. She noted that "the lads' priorities are plainly spelled out on the track 'Without You' as they state 'I couldn't live without my cell phone, my 4X4, my credit card, I couldn't live without you' and like the previous album, it ended with a soulful ballad, 'Like a Friend.'" Entertainment.ie wrote: "Maybe it's the fact that the lads themselves are grittier, laddier and sexier than their counterparts in Westlife, NSYNC or any of that ilk. Or maybe it's their imaginitive choice of arrangements. Whatever the reason, the music they produce is the kind of chart pop you can listen to with an easy conscience, filled with infectious grooves and soulful harmonies. At 15 tracks, One Love is about a third too long – but it's still an entertaining, slickly-produced effort that deserves all its success."

== Track listing ==
One Love tracklisting
No.	Title	Writer(s)	Producer(s)	Length
1.	"One Love"	Duncan James; Lee Ryan; Simon Webbe; Antony Costa; Mikkel S. Eriksen; Tor Erik Hermansen; Hallgeir Rustan	Stargate	3:25
2.	"Riders"	James; Ryan; Webbe; Costa; Eriksen; Hermansen; Rustan	Stargate	3:45
3.	"Flexin'"	David Dawood; Webbe; Joe Belmaati; Mich Hansen	Cutfather & Joe	4:02
4.	"Sorry Seems to Be the Hardest Word" (featuring Elton John)	Elton John; Bernie Taupin	Stargate	3:41
5.	"She Told Me"	James; Ryan; Webbe; Costa; Eriksen; Hermansen; Rustan	Stargate	4:01
6.	"Right Here Waiting"	Rob Davis; Martin Harrington; Ash Howes	Davis; Harrington; Howes	3:33
7.	"U Make Me Wanna"	John McLaughlin; Harry Wilkins; Steve Robson	Stargate	3:47
8.	"Ain't Got You"	James; Ryan; Webbe; Costa; Eriksen; Hermansen; Rustan	Stargate	4:33
9.	"Supersexual"	James; Ryan; Webbe; Costa; Gary Barlow; Eliot Kennedy; Tim Woodcock	True North	3:40
10.	"Don't Treat Me Like a Fool"	Angie Stone; Terry Britten	Cutfather & Joe	3:53
11.	"Get Down"	Davis; James	Davis	4:10
12.	"Privacy"	Rasmus Bille Bahncke; Tromborg; Remee; Ali Tennant; Webbe; Costa	Supa'Flyas	4:00
13.	"Without You"	Ryan; Mark Hall; Conner Reeves	Hall; Reeves	3:27
14.	"Invitation"	Multiman; Jens Lomholt; Philip Dencker; Webbe; Tennant	Copenhaniacs	3:33
15.	"Like a Friend"	John Themis; Costa; Tennant	Themis	4:15

Japanese Bonus Tracks
No.	Title	Writer(s)	Producer(s)	Length
16.	"If You Come Back"	Nicole Formescu; Lee Brennan; Ray Ruffin; Ian Hope	Ruffin; Craigie	3:29
17.	"Sweet Thing"	Rasmus Bähncke; René Tromborg; Damon Sharpe; Lindy Robbins; Tennant; Webbe	Supa'Flyas	3:38
18.	"Blue in Japan" (Video)

Australian Bonus Tracks
No.	Title	Writer(s)	Producer(s)	Length
16.	"All Rise" (Blacksmith R'n'B Radio Rub Dub)	Eriksen; Hermansen; Rustan; Webbe; Daniel Stephens	Stargate; Blacksmith^{[b]}	4:14
17.	"Too Close" (Blacksmith R'n'B Smooth Rub)	Kier Gist; Darren Lighty; Robert Huggar; Raphael Brown; Robert Ford, Jr.; Denzil Miller; James B. Moore; Kurtis Walker; Larry Smith	Ruffin; Cutfather & Joe^{[a]}; Blacksmith^{[b]}	5:43

Asian Special Edition Bonus AVCD
No.	Title	Writer(s)	Producer(s)	Length
1.	"One Love: The Sequel" (Music Video)			3:46
2.	"One Love: The Sequel" (Making of the Video)			3:46
3.	"One Love" (Music Video)			3:38
4.	"Sorry Seems to Be the Hardest Word" (Music Video) (featuring Elton John)			3:41
5.	"U Make Me Wanna" (Music Video)			3:38
6.	"Don't Treat Me Like a Fool" (Music Video)			3:53
7.	"Live Tour Video Clips"
8.	"One Love: The Sequel"	James; Ryan; Webbe; Costa; Eriksen; Hermansen; Rustan	StarGate; Ian Widgery^{[b]}	3:46
9.	"Sorry Seems to Be the Hardest Word" (Extended Mix) (featuring Elton John)	John; Taupin	Stargate	4:04
10.	"One Love" (Octave Remix)	James; Ryan; Webbe; Costa; Eriksen; Hermansen; Rustan	StarGate; Steve Octave^{[b]}	3:54
11.	"U Make Me Wanna" (Urban North Edit)	McLaughlin; Wilkins; Robson	Stargate; Urban North^{[b]}	3:14
12.	"Made for Loving You"	Barlow; Costa; James; Kennedy; Ryan; Webbe; Woodcock	True North	3:25
13.	"Sweet Thing"	Bähncke; Tromborg; Sharpe; Robbins; Tennant; Webbe	Supa'Flyas	3:38
14.	"Get Ready"	Smokey Robinson	Ian Levine; Clive Scott	3:23

Taiwan Special Edition Bonus DVD
No.	Title	Length
1.	"One Love" (Video)
2.	"If You Come Back" (Video)
3.	"All Rise" (Video)
4.	"Long Time" (Video)
5.	"Fly By II" (Video)
6.	"One Love" (Making of the Video)
7.	"Interview"

Notes

- The Japanese Deluxe Edition comes with a bonus DVD of the One Love Live Tour.
- ^{^[a]} signifies a co-producer
- ^{^[b]} signifies an additional producer

== Tour ==
Date	City	Country	Venue
One Love Tour:
18 November 2002	Dublin	Ireland	Point Depot
19 November 2002	Belfast	Northern Ireland	Odyssey Arena
20 November 2002	Belfast	Northern Ireland	Odyssey Arena
22 November 2002	Nottingham	England	Nottingham Arena
23 November 2002	Sheffield	England	Sheffield Arena
24 November 2002	Sheffield	England	Sheffield Arena
26 November 2002	Cardiff	Wales	Cardiff International Arena
27 November 2002	Cardiff	Wales	Cardiff International Arena
28 November 2002	Cardiff	Wales	Cardiff International Arena
30 November 2002	Birmingham	England	NEC Arena
1 December 2002	Birmingham	England	NEC Arena
3 December 2002	London	England	Wembley Arena
4 December 2002	London	England	Wembley Arena
5 December 2002	London	England	Wembley Arena
7 December 2002	Newcastle	England	Telewest Arena
8 December 2002	Newcastle	England	Telewest Arena
10 December 2002	Glasgow	Scotland	Scottish Exhibition and Conference Centre
11 December 2002	Glasgow	Scotland	Scottish Exhibition and Conference Centre
12 December 2002	Glasgow	Scotland	Scottish Exhibition and Conference Centre
14 December 2002	Manchester	England	Manchester Evening News Arena
15 December 2002	Manchester	England	Manchester Evening News Arena
16 December 2002	Birmingham	England	NEC Arena
17 December 2002	Birmingham	England	NEC Arena
19 December 2002	London	England	Wembley Arena
20 December 2002	London	England	Wembley Arena
21 December 2002	London	England	Wembley Arena

== Charts ==
=== Weekly charts ===
Weekly chart performance for One Love
Chart (2002–2003)	Peak position
Australian Albums (ARIA)	61
Austrian Albums (Ö3 Austria)	19
Belgian Albums (Ultratop Flanders)	23
Danish Albums (Hitlisten)	24
Dutch Albums (Album Top 100)	6
European Albums Chart	6
French Albums (SNEP)	32
German Albums (Offizielle Top 100)	15
Greek Albums (IFPI)	12
Hungarian Albums (MAHASZ)	18
Irish Albums (IRMA)	5
Italian Albums (FIMI)	10
Italian Albums (Musica e Dischi)	16
Japanese Albums (Oricon)	9
New Zealand Albums (RMNZ)	21
Norwegian Albums (VG-lista)	9
Scottish Albums (Official Charts)	2
Singaporean Albums (RIAS)	4
South Korean Albums (RIAK)	17
Spanish Albums (PROMUSICAE)	75
Swedish Albums (Sverigetopplistan)	56
Swiss Albums (Schweizer Hitparade)	31
UK Albums (Official Charts)	1

Chart (2010)	Peak position
Argentine Albums (CAPIF)	11

=== Year-end charts ===
2002 year-end chart performance for One Love
Chart (2002)	Position
Irish Albums (IRMA)	18
UK Albums (OCC)	5
Worldwide Albums (IFPI)	47

2003 year-end chart performance for One Love
Chart (2003)	Position
Austrian Albums (Ö3 Austria)	70
Dutch Albums (Album Top 100)	57
German Albums (Offizielle Top 100)	41
Hungarian Albums (MAHASZ)	86
Italian Albums (FIMI)	52
Swiss Albums (Schweizer Hitparade)	73
UK Albums (OCC)	68

=== Decade-end charts ===
Decade-end chart performance for One Love
Chart (2000–2009)	Position
UK Albums (OCC)	76

== Certifications and sales ==
Certifications for One Love
Region	Certification	Certified units/sales
Germany (BVMI)	Gold	150,000^{^}
Japan (RIAJ)	Platinum	200,000^{^}
New Zealand (RMNZ)	Gold	7,500^{^}
Switzerland (IFPI Switzerland)	Gold	20,000^{^}
United Kingdom (BPI)	4× Platinum	1,200,000^{^}
Summaries
Europe (IFPI)	2× Platinum	2,000,000^{*}
^{*} Sales figures based on certification alone.^{^} Shipments figures based on certification alone.

== Trivia ==
- In 2004, the "Invitation" song was used as a TV commercial theme song for the Aqua drinking product Aqua Splash of Fruit, produced by Aqua Danone in Indonesia.
