= Guilty (Blue album) =

Studio album by Blue
- Released: 3 November 2003
- Studios: Los Angeles, (United States); New York City (United States); London (United Kingdom)
- Length: 56:56
- Labels: Virgin; Innocent
- Producers: Cutfather & Joe; Deekay; Martin Harrington; Ash Howes; Steve Robson; Rob Persaud; Steve Robson; Matt Rowe; Stargate; Supa'Flyas; True North

Blue chronology
One Love (2002)	Guilty (2003)	Remixes – Japan Tour Mini Album (2004)

Singles from Guilty
- 1. "Guilty" Released: 20 October 2003; 2. "Signed, Sealed, Delivered I'm Yours" Released: 15 December 2003; 3. "Breathe Easy" Released: 22 March 2004; 4. "Bubblin'"/"You & Me Bubblin'" Released: 28 June 2004

Guilty is the third studio album by English boy band Blue. It was released on 3 November 2003 in the United Kingdom and on 25 November in the United States. It debuted at number one on the UK Singles Chart after its release, and it was certified 2× Platinum in December 2003.

The album was particularly successful in the UK, Europe, Japan and New Zealand. "Guilty", "Signed, Sealed, Delivered I'm Yours", "Breathe Easy" and "Bubblin'" were released as singles from the album. "Guilty", co-written by Gary Barlow, was the most successful single from the album, peaking at number two in the UK.

== Background ==
In October 2002, Blue released their second album One Love which debuted at number one on the UK Albums Chart with over 150,000 first-week sales and went on to become one of the year's best-selling albums, achieving 4× Platinum status with over 1.2 million copies sold in the United Kingdom. Pushed by its second single, the Elton John cover "Sorry Seems to Be the Hardest Word," which became a top five hit across Europe, the album solidified Blue's international breakthrough, achieving gold or platinum certification in multiple countries throughout Central Europe and Asia. Between November 2002 and January 2003, the band embarked on their headlining concert tour, the One Love Tour, which took them to 26 stops across Ireland and the United Kingdom.

== Singles ==
- "Guilty" — The debut single, released in October 2003. The single peaked at No. 2 on the UK Singles Chart, No. 29 on the Australian Top 40, at No. 14 in New Zealand and No. 6 in Ireland. The song has received a Silver sales status certification for sales of over 200,000 copies in the UK.
- "Signed, Sealed, Delivered I'm Yours" — The second single, released in December 2003, featuring guest vocals from Stevie Wonder. The song is a cover version of Stevie's number one hit. The single peaked at No. 11 on the UK Singles Chart, No. 31 on the Australian Top 100, No. 22 in New Zealand and No. 17 in Ireland.
- "The Gift" - A Japanese alternative single to "Signed, Sealed, Delivered I'm Yours", featuring the said track as a B-side. "The Gift" only appears on the Japanese version of Guilty. The single peaked at No. 3 on the Japan Hot 100. A music video was recorded and included on the Japanese edition of 4Ever Blue.
- "Breathe Easy" — The third single, released in March 2004. The single peaked at No. 4 on the UK Singles Chart. The song was produced by multi-platinum producers DEEKAY & co-written by Lee Ryan, Lars Halvor Jensen, and Michael Martin Larsson. The song has received a Bronze sales status certification for sales of over 100,000 copies in the UK. In Italy, an Italian-language version of the song, "A Chi Mi Dice", was released as a single instead.
- "Bubblin'" - The fourth and final single, released in June 2004. The single peaked at No. 9 on the UK Singles Chart. The single version of "Bubblin'" features vocals from L.A.D.E. In France, a French-language version of the song, "You & Me Bubblin'", was released a single instead. This version features vocals from French boyband LINK-UP.

== Critical reception ==
Professional ratings
Review scores
Source	Rating
AllMusic	2/5 stars
The Daily Telegraph	3/5 stars
laut.de	3/5 stars

Betty Clarke from The Daily Telegraph found that Guilty showed "Blue as we already know them: heavy on soul-puppy richness, light on meaning. It's easy listening in the most honourable sense, and there's no need to dress it up in seam-bursting bondage pants [...] What's left is a nifty little record." In a retrospective review for AllMusic, Sharon Mawer rated the album two out of five stars. She remarked that some songs on the album "were straying perilously close to Westlife territory and to many Blue fans, the most important thing about them was that they were not as bland as Westlife."

In a negative review, Chris Long from BBC Music, called the album "in equal parts, vapid, bland, hopelessly derivative, unimaginative and, occasionally, downright offensive." He further wrote that "there is not one moment of the ballad-heavy, drippy, sugar-sweet overdose of Guilty that deserves even a second listen [...] This is the sound of a band more interested in increasing their tabloid column inch count with their various late night shenanigans and celebrity ligging, than in their music. There is no effort, no emotion, no desire in any of the tunes on offer." laut.de editor Stefan Johannesberg concluded: "The boys may lack the charisma to be worthy heirs to Take That, but their music already has the natural class that B3, Before Four, and all that other junk are completely missing. All Blue need now are a few rough edges to stay interesting for a more mature audience in the long run." He rated Guilty three out of five stars.

== Commercial performance ==
Released on 3 November 2003, Guilty opened at number one on the UK Albums Chart, becoming Blue's third consecutive album to reach the top spot. Although the album failed to replicate the major success of its two predecessors, it would spend 24 on the chart and achieve double platinum status in the United Kingdom. It was eventually ranked 29th on its 2003 year-end listing.

== Track listing ==
Guilty track listing
No.	Title	Writer(s)	Producer(s)	Length
1.	"Stand Up"	Antony Costa; Duncan James; Lee Ryan; Simon Webbe; Joe Belmaati; Mich Hansen; Remee	Cutfather & Joe	3:38
2.	"Signed, Sealed, Delivered I'm Yours" (featuring Stevie Wonder and Angie Stone)	Stevie Wonder; Lee Garrett; Syreeta Wright; Lula Mae Hardaway	Martin Harrington; Ash Howes	3:33
3.	"Taste It"	James; Gary Barlow; Eliot Kennedy; Tim Woodcock	True North	3:33
4.	"Guilty"	James; Barlow; Kennedy; Woodcock	True North; Harrington; Howes	3:45
5.	"Bubblin'"	Costa; Lars Halvor Jensen; Johannes Jørgensen; Ali Tennant	Deekay	3:05
6.	"Rock the Night"	Costa; Matt Rowe; Sheppard Solomon	Rowe	3:21
7.	"When Summer's Gone"	Costa; James; Ryan; Webbe; Mikkel S. Eriksen; Tor Erik Hermansen; Hallgeir Rustan	Stargate	4:11
8.	"Alive"	Costa; James; Ryan; Webbe; Eriksen; Hermansen; Rustan	Stargate	3:39
9.	"I Wanna Know"	Costa; James; Rasmus Bille Bahncke; René Tromborg; Nate Butler; Leonard Dixon	Supa'Flyas	3:38
10.	"Back It Up"	Costa; Webbe; Jensen; Dicky Daniel Klein; Jørgensen; Tennant	Deekay	3:32
11.	"Breathe Easy"	Ryan; Jensen; Martin M. Larsson	Deekay	4:36
12.	"Walk Away"	Ryan; Howes; Wayne Hector; Harrington	Harrington; Howes	4:39
13.	"Where You Want Me"	James; John McLaughlin; Steve Robson	Robson	3:45
14.	"How's a Man Supposed to Change?"	Ryan; Rob Persaud	Persaud	4:04
15.	"No Goodbyes"	Costa; Howes; Harrington; Conner Reeves	Harrington; Howes	3:57
Total length:				56:56

Japanese bonus tracks
No.	Title	Writer(s)	Producer(s)	Length
16.	"The Gift"	Noriyuki Makihara	Deekay	4:55
17.	"Elements"	Costa; Ryan; Jensen; Tennant	Deekay	3:33

South American bonus tracks
No.	Title	Writer(s)	Producer(s)	Length
16.	"One Love" (Latin version) (featuring Ilona)	Costa; James; Ryan; Webbe; Eriksen; Hermansen; Rustan	Stargate	3:42
17.	"Sorry Seems to Be the Hardest Word" (extended mix) (featuring Elton John)	Bernie Taupin; Elton John	Stargate	4:04

Spanish bonus tracks
No.	Title	Writer(s)	Producer(s)	Length
16.	"One Love" (Spanish version) (featuring Mariana Ochoa)	Costa; James; Ryan; Webbe; Eriksen; Hermansen; Rustan	Stargate	3:42
17.	"Sorry Seems to Be the Hardest Word" (extended mix) (featuring Elton John)	Taupin; John	Stargate	4:04

International edition
No.	Title	Writer(s)	Producer(s)	Length
5.	"You and Me Bubblin'" (duet with Linkup)	Costa; Jensen; Jørgensen; Tennant	Deekay	3:08
16.	"U Make Me Wanna"	Robson; McLaughlin; Wilkins	StarGate	3:40
17.	"Bubblin'" (featuring L.A.D.E)	Costa; Jensen; Jørgensen; Tennant	Deekay	3:29
18.	"A Chi Mi Dice"	Tiziano Ferro; Ryan; Jensen; Larsson	Deekay	4:36

Asian tour edition bonus AVCD
No.	Title	Writer(s)	Producer(s)	Length
1.	"Guilty" (music video)
2.	"Signed, Sealed, Delivered I'm Yours" (music video)
3.	"Breathe Easy" (music video)
4.	"Bubblin'" (music video)
5.	"The Gift"	Makihara	Deekay	4:55
6.	"Whatever Happens"	Costa; James; Ryan; Webbe; Barlow; Kennedy; Woodcock	True North	3:45
7.	"Elements"	Costa; Jensen; Jørgensen; Tennant	Deekay	3:33
8.	"Guilty" (original demo)	James; Barlow; Kennedy; Woodcock	True North; Harrington; Howes	3:24
9.	"'Guilty' Medley"			7:09

Guilty: Live from Wembley – bonus CD
No.	Title	Writer(s)	Producer(s)	Length
1.	"The Gift"	Makihara	Deekay	4:55
2.	"4 Play"	Webbe; George Hammond‑Hagan; John Hammond‑Hagan	The Big Pockets	3:24
3.	"Whatever Happens"	Costa; James; Ryan; Webbe; Barlow; Kennedy; Woodcock	True North	3:45
4.	"Elements"	Costa; Jensen; Jørgensen; Tennant	Deekay	3:33
5.	"Sorry Seems to Be the Hardest Word" (Blue solo version)	John; Taupin	Stargate	3:42
6.	"Breathe Easy" (alternative edit)	Ryan; Jensen; Larsson	Deekay	4:12
7.	"Breathe Easy" (Love 4 Music Remix)	Ryan; Jensen; Larsson	Deekay; Love 4 Music^{[a]}	4:12
8.	"Bubblin'" (Love 4 Music Remix)	Costa; Jensen; Jørgensen; Tennant	Deekay; Love 4 Music^{[a]}	3:30
9.	"If You Come Back" (The Playa's Mix)	Ruffin; Nicole Formescu; Ian Hope; Lee Brennan	Ruffin; Andy Mac & Obi^{[a]}	3:57
10.	"Guilty" (original demo)	James; Barlow; Kennedy; Woodcock	True North; Harrington; Howes	3:24

Notes

- ^{^[a]} signifies a remix producer

== Tour ==
Date	City	Country	Venue
Guilty Tour:
4 November 2003	Belfast	Northern Ireland	Odyssey Arena
5 November 2003	Dublin	Ireland	Point Depot
8 November 2003	Birmingham	England	NEC Arena
9 November 2003	Birmingham	England	NEC Arena
10 November 2003	Bournemouth	England	Bournemouth International Centre
12 November 2003	London	England	Wembley Arena
13 November 2003	London	England	Wembley Arena
16 November 2003	Cardiff	Wales	Cardiff International Arena
17 November 2003	Cardiff	Wales	Cardiff International Arena
18 November 2003	Cardiff	Wales	Cardiff International Arena
19 November 2003	Cardiff	Wales	Cardiff International Arena
21 November 2003	Nottingham	England	Nottingham Arena
22 November 2003	Brighton	England	Brighton Centre
23 November 2003	Brighton	England	Brighton Centre
25 November 2003	Nottingham	England	Nottingham Arena
26 November 2003	Sheffield	England	Hallam FM Arena
27 November 2003	Sheffield	England	Hallam FM Arena
29 November 2003	Newcastle	England	Telewest Arena
30 November 2003	Newcastle	England	Telewest Arena
2 December 2003	Glasgow	Scotland	Scottish Exhibition and Conference Centre
3 December 2003	Glasgow	Scotland	Scottish Exhibition and Conference Centre
4 December 2003	Glasgow	Scotland	Scottish Exhibition and Conference Centre
6 December 2003	Birmingham	England	NEC Arena
7 December 2003	Birmingham	England	NEC Arena
9 December 2003	Cardiff	Wales	Cardiff International Arena
10 December 2003	Cardiff	Wales	Cardiff International Arena
12 December 2003	London	England	Wembley Arena
13 December 2003	London	England	Wembley Arena
14 December 2003	London	England	Wembley Arena
19 December 2003	Manchester	England	Manchester Evening News Arena
20 December 2003	Manchester	England	Manchester Evening News Arena

== Charts ==
=== Weekly charts ===
Weekly chart performance for Guilty
Chart (2003–2004)	Peak position
Australian Albums (ARIA)	93
Austrian Albums (Ö3 Austria)	13
Belgian Albums (Ultratop Flanders)	24
Danish Albums (Hitlisten)	27
Dutch Albums (Album Top 100)	24
European Albums Chart	5
French Albums (SNEP)	97
German Albums (Offizielle Top 100)	8
Greek Albums (IFPI)	5
Hungarian Albums (MAHASZ)	37
Irish Albums (IRMA)	7
Italian Albums (FIMI)	7
Italian Albums (Musica e Dischi)	13
Japanese Albums (Oricon)	4
New Zealand Albums (RMNZ)	25
Scottish Albums (Official Charts)	3
Singaporean Albums (RIAS)	1
South Korean Albums (RIAK)	4
Swedish Albums (Sverigetopplistan)	55
Swiss Albums (Schweizer Hitparade)	12
UK Albums (Official Charts)	1

=== Year-end charts ===
2003 year-end chart performance for Guilty
Chart (2003)	Position
UK Albums (OCC)	29

2004 year-end chart performance for Guilty
Chart (2004)	Position
European Albums (Billboard)	69
German Albums (Offizielle Top 100)	82
Swiss Albums (Schweizer Hitparade)	100
UK Albums (OCC)	181

== Certifications ==
Certifications of Guilty, with sales where available
Region	Certification	Certified units/sales
Germany (BVMI)	Gold	100,000^{^}
Italy (FIMI)	2× Platinum	200,000^{*}
Japan (RIAJ)	Gold	100,000^{^}
South Korea	—	18,476
Switzerland (IFPI Switzerland)	Gold	20,000^{^}
United Kingdom (BPI)	2× Platinum	600,000^{^}
Summaries
Europe (IFPI)	Platinum	1,000,000^{*}
^{*} Sales figures based on certification alone.^{^} Shipments figures based on certification alone.
