= All Rise (Blue album) =

Studio album by Blue
- Released: 26 November 2001
- Studios: London, England; Oslo, Norway
- Genres: Pop; R&B
- Length: 45:56
- Labels: Virgin; Innocent

Blue chronology
All Rise (2001)	One Love (2002)

Singles from All Rise
- 1. "All Rise" Released: 21 May 2001; 2. "Too Close" Released: 27 August 2001; 3. "If You Come Back" Released: 12 November 2001; 4. "Fly By II" Released: 18 March 2002; 5. "Best in Me" Released: 7 October 2002

All Rise is the debut studio album by English boy band Blue, released on 26 November 2001 in the United Kingdom.

The album received mixed to positive reviews from critics, who praised its polished pop production, strong vocal performances, and R&B-influenced sound, though some noted reliance on conventional boyband formulas. All Rise was a commercial success, debuting at number two on the UK Albums Chart before reaching number one in its 22nd week, and was certified 4× Platinum in the UK, selling over 1.3 million copies. In Europe, it was certified Platinum by IFPI for over one million units sold. It also achieved top ten positions across multiple territories, including Singapore and New Zealand.

All Rise was supported by four major singles released between 2001 and 2002. The lead single, "All Rise." peaked at number 4 in the UK and achieved top five positions in several territories, while the second single, a cover of R&B group Next's "Too Close" became a UK and New Zealand number one. It was followed by the UK number-one single "If You Come Back," and "Fly By II," which reached the UK top ten. All four singles received Silver certifications in the UK, each selling over 200,000 copies, while "Best in Me" was released exclusively in New Zealand, where it peaked at number 10.

== Background ==
In May 1999, Lee Ryan and Antony Costa met at the ages of 15 and 17, respectively, when auditioning for a boy band on ITV's This Morning, with Simon Cowell putting the group together. Ryan made it into the band, as did 21-year-old Will Young, although Costa was not chosen. The boy band never took off, but Ryan and Costa remained friends following their meeting. In 2000, Costa and Duncan James began forming their own band and soon recruited Ryan. Their manager Daniel Glatman later recalled being impressed by the trio’s talent and potential, leading the group to search for a fourth member. The final position was filled by Simon Webbe, Ryan's flatmate, completing the lineup of what would become Blue.

== Promotion ==
The album was preceded by five singles released between 2001 and 2002. The lead single, "All Rise," was released in May 2001 and became a major international success, peaking at number four on the UK Singles Chart, number one in New Zealand, and reaching the top five in Australia, Belgium, and Ireland. The song was certified Platinum in the UK, Australia, and Gold in Belgium. The second single, "Too Close," a cover of the hit by American R&B group Next, followed in August 2001 and became Blue's first UK number-one single, also reaching number one in New Zealand and earning Silver certification in the UK and Platinum certification in Australia.

The album third single, "If You Come Back," was released in November 2001 and topped the UK Singles Chart, while also charting in several European markets; it was later certified Gold in the UK. "Fly By II" was released as the fourth single in March 2002, reaching number six in the UK and achieving further chart placements in countries including New Zealand, Belgium, and Ireland, receiving Silver certification in the UK. The final single, "Best in Me," was released exclusively in New Zealand on 7 October 2002, where it peaked at number 10 and was later included in promotion for the compilation album Best of Blue. The planned release of All Rise in the United States was ultimately cancelled following controversy surrounding comments made by Lee Ryan in an interview with The Sun in 2001. After the band filmed the “If You Come Back” music video in New York shortly after the September 11 attacks, Ryan's remarks about the attacks being "blown out of proportion" led to significant media backlash, resulting in the loss of the group's US record deal and criticism directed at the singer.

== Critical reception ==
Professional ratings
Review scores
Source	Rating
AllMusic	3.5/5 stars
NME	2.5/5 stars
Yahoo! Music UK	7/10

The album received mixed to positive reviews from critics. Sharon Mawer of AllMusic gave the album three and half stars out of five and noted, "The vocals were sung as if there was some real feeling, and that maybe is what separated Blue from their peers." Andre Paine of the NME gave the album five stars out of ten stating, when describing some of the tracks that "All of these are fine, but so as not to alienate a single teenage girl, there's also the traditional boyband slop; "If You Come Back" [...] the ballads and various Backstreet Boys rip-offs. But at least Stargate and Ray Ruffin know what they do. And Blue are young and talented enough to secure themselves a successful pop career."

BBC News critic Michael Osborn noted that "they have produced an overall sound that is a little tighter with an edgier groove – but still in the style of a boy band [...] Like the boys claim, their vocals are peppered with a good amount of soulfulness on this track. The poppy R&B hybrid is slick and smooth, but seems to veer more in the direction of America's boy band tradition." The Guardian's Betty Clarke wrote: "Taking a sexy route that Westlife fear to tread, their smooth, sultry R&B rhythms and soaring harmonies doing little to disguise their dirty minds, Blue are the boy band who don't just inspire fantasies, they sing about them [with] the clever combination of American harmonies, British attitude and Norwegian pop sensibilities that make "All Rise" and "Fly By" such chorus-driven, hip-swinging successes." James Salmon from Yahoo! Music UK wrote that "although "All Rise" is probably the best song on the group's debut, the album of the same name is full to bursting with great pop tunes."

== Commercial performance ==
All Rise was a commercial success across multiple territories. Released on26 November 2001 in the United Kingdom, All Rise debuted at number two on the UK Albums Chart. While it went platinum after just six weeks, it was not until 28 April 2002, its 22nd week of release, that the album claimed the top spot on the chart. The Official Charts Company (OCC) ranked it 16th on its 2001 year-end chart and 26 on its 2002 year-end chart. In total, All Rise spent 63 weeks on the UK top 75 Albums chart. All Rise has since been certified 4× Platinum by the British Phonographic Industry (BPI). By February 2021, it had sold more than 1.3 million copies in the United Kingdom.

The album also performed strongly across Europe, reaching the top 10 of the European Albums Chart and earning Platinum certification from the International Federation of the Phonographic Industry (IFPI) for over one million units sold. All Rise reached number one in Singapore and number two in New Zealand, as well as the top five in Belgium, Ireland, and Malaysia, and the top 10 in Denmark and Scotland. It also charted in Australia, Germany, Norway, and Portugal, among others and received 2× Platinum certification in New Zealand (30,000 units), Gold certification in Australia (35,000 units), Denmark (25,000 units), and Malaysia (15,000 units).

== Track listing ==
All Rise track listing
No.	Title	Writer(s)	Producer(s)	Length
1.	"All Rise"	Mikkel S. Eriksen; Hallgeir Rustan; Tor Erik Hermansen; Simon Webbe; Daniel Stephens	Stargate	3:43
2.	"Too Close"	Kier Gist; Darren Lighty; Robert Huggar; Raphael Brown; Robert Ford, Jr.; Denzil Miller; James B. Moore; Kurtis Walker; Larry Smith	Ray Ruffin; Cutfather & Joe^{[a]}	3:45
3.	"This Temptation"	Eliot Kennedy; Steve Richards; Webbe; Antony Costa; Duncan James; Lee Ryan	Steelworks; Dancin' Danny D^{[a]}	3:35
4.	"If You Come Back"	Ruffin; Nicole Formescu; Ian Hope; Lee Brennan	Ruffin; Pete Craigie^{[a]}; Stevie Lange^{[b]}	3:27
5.	"Fly By"	Eriksen; Rustan; Hermansen; Webbe	Stargate	3:46
6.	"Bounce"	Eriksen; Rustan; Hermansen; Webbe	Stargate	3:54
7.	"Long Time"	Hope; Ruffin; Costa; Webbe	Ruffin	4:14
8.	"Make It Happen"	Jan Kask; Peter Mansson; Wayne Hector; Ali Tennant	Stargate; Kask^{[a]}; Mansson^{[a]}; Lange^{[b]}	3:14
9.	"Back to You"	Hope; Ruffin; Webbe; Costa; James; Ryan	Ruffin; Craigie^{[a]}; Lange^{[b]}	3:04
10.	"Girl I'll Never Understand"	Tim Woodcock; Gary Barlow	Steelworks; Craigie^{[a]}	3:26
11.	"Back Some Day"	Woodcock; Mike Terry	Steelworks; Craigie^{[a]}	4:00
12.	"Best in Me"	Bill Padley; Jem Godfrey	Padley; Godfrey	3:12
Total length:				45:56

Japanese special edition bonus tracks
No.	Title	Writer(s)	Producer(s)	Length
13.	"All Rise" (Blacksmith R'n'B Club Rub)	Eriksen; Hermansen; Rustan; Webbe; Stephens	Stargate; Blacksmith^{[c]}	4:24
14.	"If You Come Back" (Blacksmith R'n'B Smooth Rub)	Formescu; Brennan; Ruffin; Hope	Ruffin; Craigie^{[a]}; Lange^{[b]}; Blacksmith^{[c]}	3:41
15.	"If You Come Back" (The Playa's Mix)	Formescu; Brennan; Ruffin; Hope	Ruffin; Craigie^{[a]}; Lange^{[b]}; Andy Mac^{[c]}; Obi^{[c]}	3:57
16.	"Too Close" (Live from Rumba, Melbourne)	Gist; Lighty; Huggar; Brown; Ford; Miller; Moore; Walker; Smith	Ruffin; Cutfather & Joe^{[a]}	5:02
Total length:				62:50

Asian special edition bonus AVCD
No.	Title	Writer(s)	Producer(s)	Length
1.	"All Rise" (Music video)			3:43
2.	"Too Close" (Music video)			3:45
3.	"If You Come Back" (Music video)			3:27
4.	"Fly By II" (Music video)			3:46
5.	"Best in Me" (Music video)			3:11
6.	"All Rise" (Acoustic)	Eriksen; Hermansen; Rustan; Webbe; Stephens	Stargate	3:43
7.	"Too Close" (Blacksmith R'n'B Club Rub)	Gist; Lighty; Huggar; Brown; Ford; Miller; Moore; Walker; Smith	Ruffin; Cutfather & Joe^{[a]}; Blacksmith^{[c]}	3:45
8.	"If You Come Back" (8 Jam Street Mix)	Formescu; Brennan; Ruffin; Hope	Ruffin; Craigie^{[a]}; Lange^{[b]}; Mac^{[c]}; Obi^{[c]}	3:27
9.	"Fly By" (Stargate Trilogy Remix)	Eriksen; Hermansen; Rustan; Webbe	Stargate	3:46
10.	"This Temptation" (Blacksmith R'n'B Radio Rub)	Kennedy; Richards; Webbe; Costa; James; Ryan	Steelworks; Dancin' Danny D^{[a]}; Blacksmith^{[c]}	3:35
11.	"Love R.I.P."	Padley; Godfrey	Padley; Godfrey	3:39
12.	"Megamix"	John Riley	Riley	6:56

Deluxe edition bonus disc
No.	Title	Writer(s)	Producer(s)	Length
1.	"Sweet Thing"	Rasmus Bähncke; René Tromborg; Damon Sharpe; Lindy Robbins; Tennant; Webbe	Supa'Flyas	3:36
2.	"Made for Loving You"	Kennedy; Barlow; Woodcock	Steelworks; Craigie^{[a]}	3:25
3.	"All Rise" (Acoustic)	Eriksen; Hermansen; Rustan; Webbe; Stephens	Stargate	3:43
4.	"Too Close" (Blacksmith R'n'B Club Rub)	Gist; Lighty; Huggar; Brown; Ford; Miller; Moore; Walker; Smith	Ruffin; Cutfather & Joe^{[a]}; Blacksmith^{[c]}	3:45
5.	"If You Come Back" (8 Jam Street Mix)	Formescu; Brennan; Ruffin; Hope	Ruffin; Craigie^{[a]}; Lange^{[b]}; Mac^{[c]}; Obi^{[c]}	3:27

Notes

- ^{^[a]} signifies an additional producer
- ^{^[b]} signifies an additional vocal producer
- ^{^[c]} signifies a remix producer

== Charts ==
=== Weekly charts ===
Weekly chart performance for All Rise
Chart (2001–2002)	Peak position
Australian Albums (ARIA)	31
Australian Urban Albums (ARIA)	3
Belgian Albums (Ultratop Flanders)	4
Danish Albums (Hitlisten)	9
European Albums Chart	8
French Albums (SNEP)	147
German Albums (Offizielle Top 100)	68
Irish Albums (IRMA)	5
Malaysian Albums (IFPI)	5
New Zealand Albums (RMNZ)	2
Norwegian Albums (VG-lista)	28
Portuguese Albums (AFP)	30
Scottish Albums (OCC)	6
Singaporean Albums (RIAS)	1
UK Albums (Official Charts)	1

=== Year-end charts ===
2001 year-end chart performance for All Rise
Chart (2001)	Position
Irish Albums (IRMA)	3
UK Albums (OCC)	16

2002 year-end chart performance for All Rise
Chart (2002)	Position
Belgian Albums (Ultratop Flanders)	55
Canadian R&B Albums (Nielsen SoundScan)	107
European Albums (Eurochart Hot 100)	29
New Zealand Albums (RMNZ)	17
UK Albums (OCC)	26

2003 year-end chart performance for All Rise
Chart (2003)	Position
UK Albums (OCC)	175

=== Decade-end charts ===
Decade-end chart performance for All Rise
Chart (2000–2009)	Position
UK Albums (OCC)	91

== Certifications and sales ==
Certifications of All Rise, with sales where available
Region	Certification	Certified units/sales
Australia (ARIA)	Gold	35,000^{^}
Denmark (IFPI Danmark)	Gold	25,000^{^}
Malaysia (RIM)	Gold	15,000
New Zealand (RMNZ)	2× Platinum	30,000^{^}
United Kingdom (BPI)	4× Platinum	1,300,000
Summaries
Europe (IFPI)	Platinum	1,000,000^{*}
^{*} Sales figures based on certification alone.^{^} Shipments figures based on certification alone.
