= Only Words I Know =

2005 single by Blue

Single by Blue

from the album Best of Blue
- Released: 13 June 2005
- Studio: CPH (Copenhagen, Denmark); Townhouse, The Dairy (London, England); Love 4 Music
- Length: 3:36
- Label: Innocent; Virgin
- Songwriters: Simon Webbe; Philip Dencker; Jens Lomholt; Frederik Nordsø; Remee; Ali Tennant
- Producer: Copenhaniacs

Blue singles chronology
"Get Down on It" (2005)	"Only Words I Know" (2005)	"I Can" (2011)

"Only Words I Know" is a song by English boy band Blue. It was released on 13 June 2005 as the third and final single from their first greatest hits album, Best of Blue (2004). The song was produced by Copenhaniacs and reached number two in Italy, where it was re-recorded for the Italian market with the subtitle "Italian version". The song also peaked at number 55 on the German Singles Chart.

== Track listings ==
European CD single

1. "Only Words I Know" (album version) – 3:36
2. "Only Words I Know" (Italian version) – 3:36

Italian CD single

1. "Only Words I Know" (Italian version) – 3:36
2. "Only Words I Know" (album version) – 3:35
3. "Too Close" (Blacksmith R'N'B club rub) – 5:41
4. "Get Down on It" (Obi & Josh mix) – 4:01

== Credits and personnel ==
Credits are taken from the Best of Blue album booklet.

Studios

- Recorded at CPH Studios (Copenhagen, Denmark), Townhouse, The Dairy (London, England), and Love 4 Music
- Mixed at DEEKAY Studios (Copenhagen, Denmark)
- Mastered at Alchemy Mastering and 360 Mastering (London, England)

Personnel

- Simon Webbe – writing
- Copenhaniacs – keys, drums, percussion, programming, production, recording
  - Philip Dencker – writing
  - Jens Lomholt – writing
- Frederik Nordsø – writing, guitar
- Remee – writing
- Ali Tennant – writing
- Martin M. Larsson – mixing
- John Davis – mastering (Alchemy)
- Dick Beetham – mastering (360)

== Charts ==
=== Weekly charts ===
Chart (2005)	Peak position
Croatia (HRT)	3
Germany (GfK)	55
Italy (FIMI)	2
Italy (Musica e dischi)	3

=== Year-end charts ===
Chart (2005)	Position
Italy (FIMI)	28

== Certifications ==
Region	Certification	Certified units/sales
Italy	—	14,000
