= Get Down on It =

1981 single by Kool & the Gang

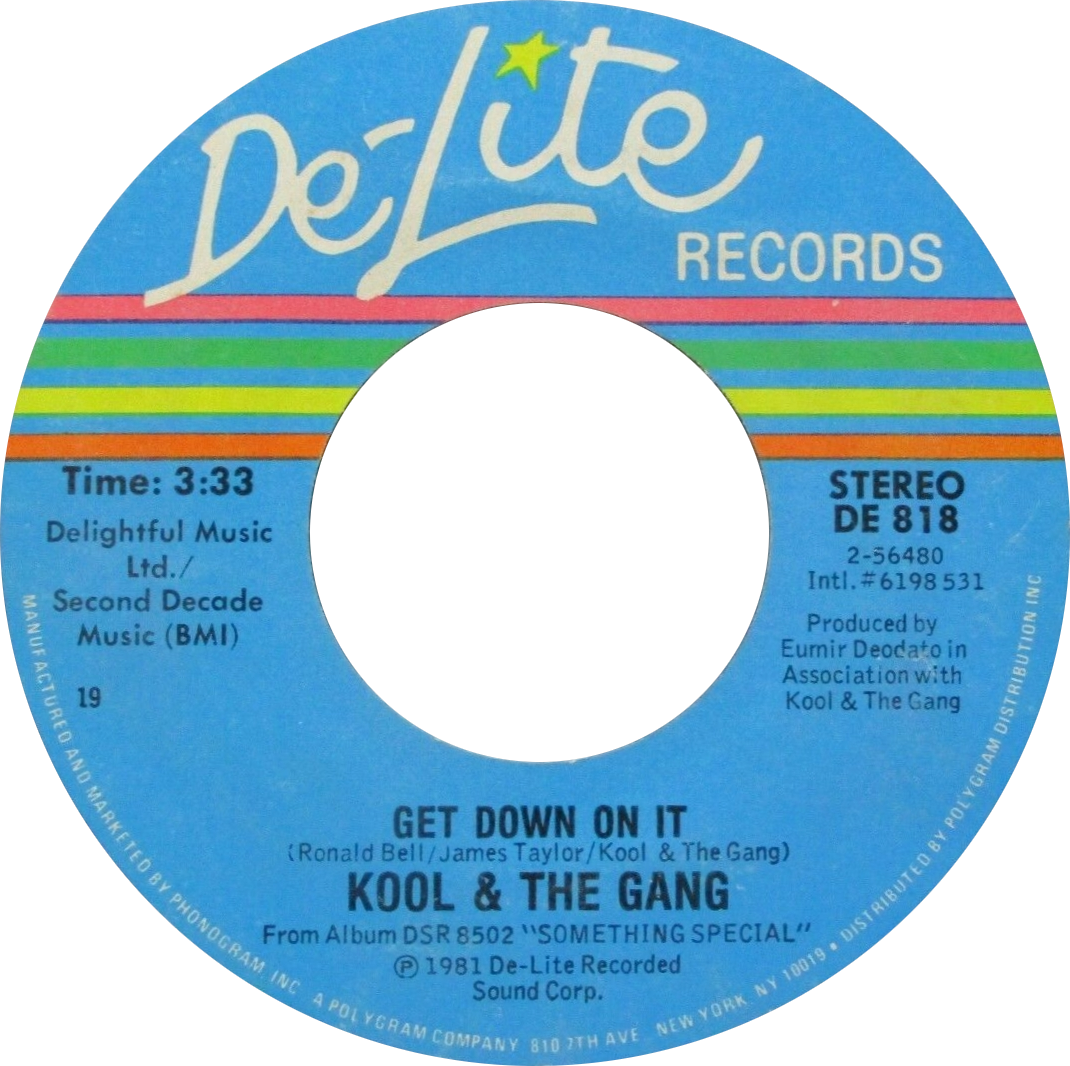
- One of side-A labels of US single

Single by Kool & the Gang

from the album Something Special
- B-side: "Steppin' Out"
- Released: November 24, 1981
- Genre: Funk; post-disco
- Length: 4:52 (album version); 4:36 (video version); 3:33 (single version)
- Label: De-Lite
- Songwriters: Ronald Nathan Bell; Claydes Charles Smith; George Melvin Brown; James "J.T." Taylor; Robert Spike Mickens; Robert Earl Bell; Eumir Deodato
- Producers: Eumir Deodato in association with Kool & the Gang

Kool & the Gang singles chronology
"Steppin' Out" (1981)	"Get Down on It" (1981)	"No Show" (1982)

Music video
- "Get Down on It” on YouTube

"Get Down on It" is a song by American band Kool & the Gang. It was originally released on their Something Special album in 1981. The single was certified platinum by the RIAA.

Record World called it a "kinetic dancer" and said that the "chant-like chorus hook is contagious."

== Composition ==
Robert "Kool" Bell stated their inspiration to write the song after his brother and friends listened to Bob Marley during a studio rehearsal session. He characterized the song as being "not quite reggae" despite having a reggae "feel" to it. Ronald Bell corroborated this story, explaining that they began writing the song after vocalist James "JT" Taylor began singing after he began playing a reggae melody. Bell felt that the song was a perfect blend of the pop and funk music, noting they also took inspiration from their work in the 1970s.

== Track listing ==
French 12-inch Vogue Records – 310933, De-Lite Records – 310933
No.	Title	Writer(s)	Length
1.	"Get Down on It"	James Taylor, Ronald Bell & Kool & the Gang	6:07
2.	"No Show"	George Brown, James Taylor, Ronald Bell & Kool and the Gang	4:19

Get Down on It/Steppin' Out, De-Lite Records – DE 818
No.	Title	Writer(s)	Length
1.	"Get Down on It"	James Taylor, Ronald Bell & Kool & the Gang	3:33
2.	"Steppin' Out"	Ronald Bell, James Taylor & Kool & the Gang	3:28

Get Down on It/Take My Heart (You Can Have It If You Want It), De-Lite Records – DG2607:
No.	Title	Writer(s)	Length
1.	"Get Down on It"	James Taylor, Ronald Bell & Kool & the Gang	3:33
2.	"Take My Heart (You Can Have It If You Want It)"	Claydes Charles Smith, James Taylor & George Brown	3:59

== Charts ==
The song hit the top 10 of the US Pop and R&B charts in Billboard in early 1982. It entered the UK charts in December 1981 and reached number three, their highest-charting hit in the UK at that time. It spent a total of 12 weeks on the British play list. Ten years later, it was re-released in the UK charts – on the Mercury label – but only charted for a week (at number 69).

=== Weekly charts ===
Chart (1982)	Peak position
Belgium (Ultratop 50 Flanders)	15
Belgium (Ultratip Bubbling Under Wallonia)	5
Canada Top Singles (RPM)	11
Netherlands (Dutch Top 40)	8
Netherlands (Single Top 100)	10
New Zealand (Recorded Music NZ)	3
South Africa (Springbok Radio)	1
UK Singles (Official Charts)	3
US Billboard Hot 100	10
US Dance Club Songs (Billboard)	16
US Hot R&B/Hip-Hop Songs (Billboard)	4
West Germany (GfK)	43

=== Year-end charts ===
Chart (1982)	Position
Belgium (Ultratop Flanders)	98
Netherlands (Single Top 100)	87
US Billboard Hot 100	82

== Charts for Eiffel 65 remix ==
Chart (2000)	Peak position
France (SNEP)	35
Switzerland (Schweizer Hitparade)	98

== Certifications ==
Region	Certification	Certified units/sales
Denmark (IFPI Danmark)	Gold	45,000^{‡}
Italy (FIMI)	Gold	50,000^{‡}
New Zealand (RMNZ)	2× Platinum	60,000^{‡}
United Kingdom (BPI)	Platinum	600,000^{‡}
United States (RIAA)	Platinum	1,000,000^{‡}
^{‡} Sales+streaming figures based on certification alone.

== Peter Andre version ==
"Get Down on It"

Single by Peter Andre featuring Past to Present

from the album Natural
- B-side: "Tell Me When"
- Released: February 12, 1996
- Length: 4:47
- Label: Melodian
- Songwriters: Bell, Taylor, Brown, Hickens, Nash, Giftens, Thomas, Smith, West
- Producer: Ashley Cadell

Peter Andre singles chronology
"Mysterious Girl" (1995)	"Get Down on It" (1996)	"Only One" (1996)

"Get Down on It" was re-recorded and released as the third overall single from English-Australian singer Peter Andre's second studio album, Natural. The single features the band Past to Present and reached No. 5 in Australia and No. 1 in New Zealand, achieving platinum status there in April 1996.

=== Track listings ===
Australian CD1

1. "Get Down on It"
2. "Tell Me When"
3. "Get Down on It" (The One World Mix)

Australian CD2 and cassette single

1. "Get Down on It" (single version)
2. "Get Down on It" (The One World Mix)
3. "Get Down on It" (instrumental)
4. "Get Down on It" (extended version)
5. "Get Down on It" (The Toyboy Mix)
6. "Get Down on It" (no rap)

=== Charts ===
Weekly charts

Chart (1996)	Peak position
Australia (ARIA)	5
New Zealand (Recorded Music NZ)	1

Year-end charts

Chart (1996)	Position
Australia (ARIA)	43
New Zealand (RIANZ)	19

=== Certifications ===
Region	Certification	Certified units/sales
Australia (ARIA)	Gold	35,000^{^}
New Zealand (RMNZ)	Platinum	10,000^{*}
^{*} Sales figures based on certification alone.^{^} Shipments figures based on certification alone.

== Blue version ==
"Get Down on It"

Single by Blue featuring Kool & the Gang and Lil' Kim

from the album Best of Blue
- Released: February 2, 2005
- Length: 4:37
- Label: Innocent, Virgin
- Songwriters: Ronald Nathan Bell, Claydes Charles Smith, George Melvin Brown, James "J.T." Taylor, Robert Spike Mickens, Robert Earl Bell, Eumir Deodato
- Producers: Ronald Bell, Leigh Guest, Damien Egan

Blue singles chronology
"Curtain Falls" (2004)	"Get Down on It" (2005)	"Only Words I Know" (2005)

Music video
- "Get Down on It" on YouTube

In 2004, British pop group Blue recorded the song for their greatest hits compilation album Best of Blue, which features Kool & the Gang and American rapper Lil' Kim. The song was released as the second single from the compilation in Japan and across Europe except in the UK. Blue's version became a hit in mainland Europe, including Spain, where it reached number three and spent eight weeks in the top 20.

=== Critical reception ===
Sarah Harris of the Evening Chronicle praised the single, scribing "There isn't much to say about this single, apart from yet again we are treated to another great single from hit band Blue. This time they have teamed up with Kool & the Gang and Lil' Kim, to produce a great cover of 'Get Down on It', originally released by Kool & the Gang." She continued saying "The whole band seems to be involved, and it's a great song to dance to." Music Week also noted "Blue have added rap sections, most notably a sassy contribution from Lil' Kim, to the hand-clapping funk of James Taylor and the Gangs' original version."

=== Track listings ===
European CD1

1. "Get Down on It" (radio edit) – 3:36
2. "Get Down on It" (Obi & Josh mix) – 4:01

European CD2

1. "Get Down on It" (radio edit) – 3:36
2. "Get Down on It" (Obi & Josh mix) – 4:01
3. "Elements" – 3:40
4. "Welcome to the Show" – 3:30
5. "Ballad Medley" – 5:24
6. Special content

=== Charts ===
Chart (2005)	Peak position
Austria (Ö3 Austria Top 40)	41
Belgium (Ultratop 50 Flanders)	24
Belgium (Ultratip Bubbling Under Wallonia)	1
Finland (Suomen virallinen lista)	16
Germany (GfK)	29
Greece (IFPI)	27
Ireland (IRMA)	47
Hungary (Single Top 40)	6
Netherlands (Single Top 100)	96
Poland Airplay (Polish Airplay Charts)	4
Spain (Promusicae)	3
Spain Airplay (Top 40 Radio)	33
Switzerland (Schweizer Hitparade)	35
UK Airplay (Music Week)	16

=== Release history ===
Region	Date	Format(s)	Label(s)	Ref.
Japan	February 2, 2005	CD	EMI	
Europe	February 21, 2005	CD	Innocent; Virgin	

== See also ==
- List of post-disco artists and songs
- Get down
