= Bubblin' (Blue song) =

2004 single by Blue

Single by Blue

from the album Guilty
- B-side: "Move On"
- Released: 28 June 2004
- Studio: Deekay (Copenhagen, Denmark)
- Length: 3:42 (single version); 3:05 (album version)
- Label: Innocent; Virgin
- Songwriters: Antony Costa; Lars Halvor Jensen; Johannes Joergensen; Ali Tennant; Lareece (rap)
- Producer: Deekay

Blue singles chronology
"Breathe Easy" (2004)	"Bubblin'" (2004)	"Curtain Falls" (2004)

Music video
- "Bubblin'" on YouTube

"Bubblin'" is a song by English boy band Blue. The song was released as the fourth and final single from their third studio album, Guilty (2003). Uncredited on the song is girl group L.A.D.É., who performs the rap verse. It was released as a single on 28 June 2004 in the United Kingdom, where it reached nine on the UK Singles Chart. It also became a top-ten hit in Switzerland and Wallonia, as well as a top-five hit in Hungary and Italy. A French version of the song featuring Linkup, titled "You and Me Bubblin'", was released in France and peaked at number 13.

== Track listings ==
UK CD1 and European CD single

1. "Bubblin'" (single version featuring L.A.D.É.) – 3:42
2. "Bubblin'" (Urban North Master mix featuring L.A.D.É.) – 5:39

UK CD2

1. "Bubblin'" (single version featuring L.A.D.É.) – 3:42
2. "Move On" – 3:33
3. "Bubblin'" (Love 4 Music remix featuring L.A.D.É. and Blarny) – 4:09
4. "Bubblin'" (Obi & Josh remix) – 3:30

European maxi-CD single

1. "Bubblin'" (single version featuring L.A.D.É.) – 3:42
2. "Move On" – 3:33
3. "Bubblin'" (Urban North remix featuring L.A.D.É.) – 4:09
4. "Bubblin'" (Obi & Josh remix) – 3:30

Japanese CD single

1. "Bubblin'" (single version featuring L.A.D.É.) – 3:44
2. "Move On" – 3:34
3. "Bubblin'" (Urban North remix featuring L.A.D.É.) – 5:41
4. "Bubblin'" (Obi & Josh remix) – 3:31
5. "Bubblin'" (Love 4 Music remix featuring L.A.D.É. and Blarny) – 4:13

"You and Me Bubblin'"

1. "You and Me Bubblin'" (with Linkup) – 3:08
2. "Bubblin'" (radio version) – 3:05
3. "Bubblin'" (Obi & Josh remix) – 3:30

== Credits and personnel ==
Credits for "Bubblin'" are lifted from the UK CD1 liner notes. Additional personnel for "You and Me Bubblin'" are lifted from the French CD single liner notes.

Studios

- Recorded and mixed at Deekay Studio (Copenhagen, Denmark)
- Additional vocals recorded at Metropolis Studios (London, England) and Sanctuary Studios (Watford, England)

Personnel

- Antony Costa – writing
- Lars Halvor Jensen – writing, all instruments, vocal production
- Johannes Joergensen – writing
- Ali Tennant – writing
- Lareece – writing (rap), rap
- François Welgryn – writing ("You and Me Bubblin'")
- Martin M. Larsson – all instruments
- Josh – all instruments and programming
- Deekay – production, mixing

== Charts ==
=== Weekly charts ===
Chart (2004)	Peak position
Austria (Ö3 Austria Top 40)	27
Belgium (Ultratop 50 Flanders)	34
Belgium (Ultratop 50 Wallonia)	10
France (SNEP) "You and Me Bubblin'"	13
Germany (GfK)	11
Hungary (Single Top 40)	4
Ireland (IRMA)	21
Italy (FIMI)	3
Italy (Musica e dischi)	3
Netherlands (Dutch Top 40)	21
Netherlands (Single Top 100)	36
Romania (Romanian Top 100)	24
Scottish Singles Sales (Official Charts)	7
Switzerland (Schweizer Hitparade)	8
UK Singles (Official Charts)	9
UK Airplay (Music Week)	32

=== Year-end charts ===
Chart (2004)	Position
Belgium (Ultratop 50 Wallonia)	49
France (SNEP)	60
Germany (Media Control GfK)	54
Italy (FIMI)	24
Switzerland (Schweizer Hitparade)	66
UK Singles (OCC)	134

== Release history ==
Region	Date	Format(s)	Label(s)	Ref.
United Kingdom	28 June 2004	CD	Virgin; Innocent	
Japan	7 July 2004	CD	Virgin; Innocent	
