= Breathe Easy =

2004 single by Blue

Single by Blue

from the album Guilty
- B-side: "Taste It"; "Whatever Happens"
- Released: 22 March 2004
- Studio: DeeKay (Copenhagen, Denmark)
- Length: 4:35 (album version); 3:40 (radio edit)
- Label: Innocent; Virgin
- Songwriters: Lee Ryan; Lars Halvor Jensen; Martin Michael Larsson
- Producers: Lars Halvor Jensen; Martin Michael Larsson

Blue singles chronology
"Signed, Sealed, Delivered I'm Yours" (2003)	"Breathe Easy" (2004)	"Bubblin'" (2004)

Music videos
- "Breathe Easy" on YouTube; Italian version on YouTube

"Breathe Easy" is a song by British boy band Blue. It was written by Lars Halvor Jensen, Martin Michael Larsson and band member Lee Ryan for their third studio album, Guilty (2003), while production was overseen by Jensen and Larsson. It was released as the album's third single on 22 March 2004 in the United Kingdom and reached number four on the UK Singles Chart.

An Italian version of the song, entitled "A chi mi dice" (English: "To Those Who Tell Me"), was released as a single in France and Italy, with lyrics written by Tiziano Ferro. This version topped the Italian Singles Chart for eight weeks was Italy's best-selling single of 2004. It also charted in France, where it peaked at number 15.

== Critical reception ==
The song received mixed to positive reviews from contemporary music critics. Tiscali Music's review said of band-member and song co-writer "Lee Ryan proves to be more than just a pretty face with his co-written ballad 'Breathe Easy'", while they wrote about the song "'Breathe Easy' is a hauntingly beautiful track" and "[Blue] are fast becoming one of the biggest bands in Britain and with this majestic song they've just taken another step towards the pop summit". In an album review by The Guardian's Betty Clarke, "Breathe Easy" was described as a "Westlife-ish horror".

== Music video ==
A music video for "Breathe Easy" was directed by Cameron Casey and filmed in various locations throughout the Prague metropolitan area. Filming took place, among other locations, at Hlubočepy bridge, Metro station Smíchovské nádraží and Praha hlavní nádraží, the city's largest railway station.

== Track listings ==
=== "Breathe Easy" ===
UK CD1 and European CD single

1. "Breathe Easy" (album edit)
2. "Breathe Easy" (Love 4 Music Remix featuring Jaime Summaz)

UK CD2

1. "Breathe Easy" (album edit)
2. "Taste It" (live from the tour)
3. "Whatever Happens"
4. Enhanced section
  1. "Breathe Easy" (video)
  2. Opening footage from tour
  3. Live performance of "Guilty"
  4. Behind the scenes and audience footage
  5. Tour footage and interview with band

Japanese CD single

1. "Breathe Easy" (album edit)
2. "Breathe Easy" (Love 4 Music Remix featuring Jaime Summaz)
3. "Taste It" (live from the tour)
4. "Whatever Happens"

=== "A chi mi dice" ===
Italian CD single

1. "A chi mi dice"
2. "Breathe Easy" (album edit)
3. "Taste It" (live from the tour)
4. "Whatever Happens"

French CD single

1. "A chi mi dice" – 4:34
2. "Breathe Easy" – 4:41
3. "A chi mi dice" (video) – 4:34
4. "Breathe Easy" (video) – 4:41

== Credits and personnel ==
Credits for "Breathe Easy" are lifted from the UK CD1 liner notes. Additional personnel for "A chi mi dice" are lifted from the Italian CD single liner notes.

Studio

- Recorded at DeeKay Studios (Copenhagen, Denmark)
- Additional vocals recorded at Metropolis Studios (London, England) and Sanctuary Studios (Watford, England)
- Strings recorded at Polar Studios (Stockholm, Sweden)
- Mixed at the White Room (Copenhagen, Denmark)

Personnel

- Lee Ryan – writing
- Lars Halvor Jensen – writing, all other instruments, production, vocal production, arrangement
- Martin Michael Larsson – writing, all other instruments, programming, production, arrangement, mixing ("A chi mi dice")
- Tiziano Ferro – lyrics ("A chi mi dice")
- Josh – guitars
- Stockholm Session Strings – strings
- Ulf Forsberg – concertmaster
- Henrik Janson – string arrangement, conducting
- Ulf Janson – string arrangement, conducting
- Mads Nilsson – mixing
- Håkan Wollgård – engineering
- Andrew Murabito – sleeve artwork
- Max Dodson – photography

== Charts ==
=== "Breathe Easy" ===
==== Weekly charts ====
Chart (2004)	Peak position
Austria (Ö3 Austria Top 40)	7
Belgium (Ultratop 50 Flanders)	28
Belgium (Ultratip Bubbling Under Wallonia)	16
Croatia (HRT)	6
Denmark (Tracklisten)	12
Europe (Eurochart Hot 100)	10
Germany (GfK)	7
Hungary (Single Top 40)	7
Ireland (IRMA)	4
Latvia (Latvijas Top 40)	26
Netherlands (Dutch Top 40)	13
Netherlands (Single Top 100)	21
New Zealand (Recorded Music NZ)	29
Norway (VG-lista)	12
Poland Airplay (PiF PaF)	10
Romania (Romanian Top 100)	51
Scottish Singles Sales (Official Charts)	4
Switzerland (Schweizer Hitparade)	8
UK Singles (Official Charts)	4
UK Airplay (Music Week)	20

==== Year-end charts ====
Chart (2004)	Position
Austria (Ö3 Austria Top 40)	32
Germany (Media Control GfK)	43
Switzerland (Schweizer Hitparade)	28
Taiwan (Hito Radio)	16
UK Singles (OCC)	46

=== "A chi mi dice" ===
==== Weekly charts ====
Chart (2004–2005)	Peak position
France (SNEP)	15
Italy (FIMI)	1
Italy (Musica e dischi)	1

==== Year-end charts ====
Chart (2004)	Position
Italy (FIMI)	1

== Certifications ==
Region	Certification	Certified units/sales
Germany (BVMI)	Gold	150,000^{‡}
United Kingdom (BPI)	Silver	200,000^{‡}
^{‡} Sales+streaming figures based on certification alone.

== Release history ==
Region	Date	Format(s)	Label(s)	Ref.
United Kingdom	22 March 2004	CD	Innocent; Virgin	
Japan	31 March 2004	CD	Innocent; Virgin	
