= U Make Me Wanna (Blue song) =

2003 single by Blue

Single by Blue

from the album One Love
- B-side: "Made for Loving You"
- Released: 17 March 2003
- Studio: StarGate (Norway)
- Length: 3:39
- Label: Innocent; Virgin
- Songwriters: Steve Robson; John McLaughlin; Harry Wilkins
- Producer: StarGate

Blue singles chronology
"Sorry Seems to Be the Hardest Word" (2002)	"U Make Me Wanna" (2003)	"Guilty" (2003)

Music video
- "U Make Me Wanna" on YouTube

"U Make Me Wanna" is a song by English boy band Blue. It was released as the third and final single from their second studio album, One Love (2002). It was released on 17 March 2003 in the United Kingdom and peaked at number four on the UK Singles Chart.

A bilingual remake of the same name was included on Elva Hsiao's Love's Theme Song, Kiss album. Blue was featured on the track and on the music video.

== Music video ==
The music video for "U Make Me Wanna" was filmed in Cape Town, South Africa.

== Track listings ==
UK and Japanese CD single

1. "U Make Me Wanna" – 3:39
2. "U Make Me Wanna" (Urban North edit) – 3:18
3. "Made for Loving You" – 3:25
4. "U Make Me Wanna" (video) – 3:47
5. 4 × 30-second clips
  1. Are we sex symbols?
  2. "Long Time" (acappella)
  3. Behind the scenes/"U Make Me Wanna" (Urban North Edit audio snippet)
  4. Favourite...

UK cassette single

1. "U Make Me Wanna" – 3:39
2. "U Make Me Wanna" (Stargate extended mix) – 5:29
3. "Made for Loving You" – 3:25

UK DVD single

1. "U Make Me Wanna" (video)
2. "U Make Me Wanna" (Urban North extended/photo gallery)
3. "U Make Me Wanna" (Big Jay Remix/photo gallery)
4. 4 × 30-second clips
  1. Japan promo tour
  2. Dublin fans
  3. "One Love" (live)
  4. 70's medley

European CD single

1. "U Make Me Wanna" – 3:39
2. "Made for Loving You" – 3:25

== Credits and personnel ==
Credits are taken from the UK CD single liner notes.

Studio

- Recorded and mixed at StarGate Studios (Norway)

Personnel

- Steve Robson – writing
- John McLaughlin – writing
- Harry Wilkins – writing
- Blue – all vocals
- StarGate – production
  - Mikkel SE – all instruments
  - Hallgeir Rustan – all instruments
  - Tor Erik Hermansen – all instruments
- Max Dodson – photography

== Charts ==
=== Weekly charts ===
Chart (2003)	Peak position
Austria (Ö3 Austria Top 40)	10
Belgium (Ultratop 50 Flanders)	14
Belgium (Ultratip Bubbling Under Wallonia)	14
Czech Republic (IFPI)	2
Denmark (Tracklisten)	12
Europe (Eurochart Hot 100)	17
Europe (European Hit Radio)	6
Finland Airplay (Radiosoittolista)	13
Germany (GfK)	6
Hungary (Editors' Choice Top 40)	17
Ireland (IRMA)	5
Italy (FIMI)	19
Italy (Musica e dischi)	20
Latvia (Latvijas Top 40)	21
Netherlands (Dutch Top 40)	28
Netherlands (Single Top 100)	22
New Zealand (Recorded Music NZ)	20
Poland Airplay (PiF PaF)	16
Romania (Romanian Top 100)	5
Scottish Singles Sales (Official Charts)	5
Spain Airplay (Top 40 Radio)	31
Sweden (Sverigetopplistan)	50
Switzerland (Schweizer Hitparade)	9
UK Singles (Official Charts)	4
UK Airplay (Music Week)	6
UK Hip Hop/R&B (Official Charts)	2

=== Year-end charts ===
Chart (2003)	Position
Austria (Ö3 Austria Top 40)	71
Europe (European Hit Radio)	38
Germany (Media Control GfK)	51
Ireland (IRMA)	72
Romania (Romanian Top 100)	34
Switzerland (Schweizer Hitparade)	39
UK Singles (OCC)	62
UK Airplay (Music Week)	57

== Certifications ==
Region	Certification	Certified units/sales
Germany (BVMI)	Gold	150,000^{‡}
United Kingdom (BPI)	Silver	200,000^{‡}
^{‡} Sales+streaming figures based on certification alone.

== Release history ==
Region	Date	Format(s)	Label(s)	Ref.
United Kingdom	17 March 2003	CD; DVD; cassette	Virgin; Innocent	
Japan	29 March 2003	CD	Virgin; Innocent	
