= Best in Me =

2002 single by Blue

Single by Blue

from the album All Rise
- Released: 7 October 2002
- Length: 3:12
- Label: Virgin; Innocent
- Songwriters: Bill Padley; Jem Godfrey
- Producers: Bill Padley; Jem Godfrey

Blue singles chronology
"Fly By II" (2002)	"Best in Me" (2002)	"One Love" (2002)

Music video
- "Best In Me" on YouTube

"Best in Me" is a song by English boy band Blue. It was released exclusively in New Zealand in October 2002 as the fifth and final single from their debut studio album, All Rise (2001). The song peaked at number 10 on New Zealand's RIANZ Singles Chart.

== Music video ==
The music video was directed by Si & Ad.

== Charts ==
Weekly chart performance for "Best in Me"
Chart (2002)	Peak position
New Zealand (Recorded Music NZ)	10
