= Curtain Falls =

2004 single by Blue

Single by Blue

from the album Best of Blue
- Released: 8 November 2004
- Length: 4:03
- Label: Innocent; Virgin
- Songwriters: Stevie Wonder; Mikkel S. Eriksen; Hallgeir Rustan; Tor Erik Hermansen; Antony Costa; Duncan James; Lee Ryan; Simon Webbe
- Producer: StarGate

Blue singles chronology
"Bubblin'" (2004)	"Curtain Falls" (2004)	"Get Down on It" (2005)

Music video
- "Curtain Falls" on YouTube

"Curtain Falls" is a song by English boy band Blue. The song was co-written by the band and StarGate, who produced the track. Stevie Wonder is also credited as a writer due to the sampling of his 1976 song "Pastime Paradise". "Curtain Falls" was released on 8 November 2004 as the first single from Blue's first greatest hits album, Best of Blue (2004). It was the only song from the album released as an official single in the United Kingdom.

Commercially, "Curtain Falls" peaked at number two in Italy, number four in the United Kingdom, and number eight in Germany. In France, the song was re-recorded in French and re-titled "Quand le rideau tombe"; although it was released as a single there, only the English version charted.

== Track listings ==
UK CD1

1. "Curtain Falls" (album version)
2. "Best of Blue Medley"

UK CD2

1. "Curtain Falls" (album version) – 4:03
2. "Long Time" – 4:14
3. "Too Close" (Blacksmith R&B club rub) – 5:41

French CD single

1. "Curtain Falls" – 3:38
2. "Quand le rideau tombe" – 3:20
3. "Curtain Falls" (video) – 3:58

Japanese CD single

1. "Curtain Falls" (album version)
2. "Long Time"
3. "Too Close" (Blacksmith R&B club rub)
4. "Best of Blue Medley" (PITP)

== Credits and personnel ==
Credits are taken from the Best of Blue album booklet.

Studios

- Mixed at StarGate Studios (Norway)
- Mastered at Alchemy Mastering and 360 Mastering (London, England)

Personnel

- Stevie Wonder – writing
- StarGate – production
  - Mikkel S. Eriksen – writing, instruments
  - Hallgeir Rustan – writing, instruments
  - Tor Erik Hermansen – writing, instruments
- Antony Costa – writing
- Duncan James – writing
- Lee Ryan – writing
- Simon Webbe – writing
- John Davis – mastering (Alchemy)
- Dick Beetham – mastering (360)

== Charts ==
=== Weekly charts ===
Weekly chart performance for "Curtain Falls"
Chart (2004–2008)	Peak position
Austria (Ö3 Austria Top 40)	16
Belgium (Ultratop 50 Flanders)	20
Belgium (Ultratop 50 Wallonia)	30
CIS Airplay (TopHit)	3
Croatia (HRT)	1
Europe (Eurochart Hot 100)	6
Europe (European Hit Radio)	17
Finland (Suomen virallinen lista)	14
France (SNEP)	18
Germany (GfK)	8
Greece (IFPI)	15
Hungary (Rádiós Top 40)	38
Hungary (Single Top 40)	7
Ireland (IRMA)	10
Italy (FIMI)	2
Italy (Musica e dischi)	1
Latvia (Latvijas Top 40)	26
Netherlands (Dutch Top 40 Tipparade)	2
Netherlands (Single Top 100)	37
Poland Airplay (PiF PaF)	2
Romania (Romanian Top 100)	49
Russia Airplay (TopHit)	1
Scottish Singles Sales (Official Charts)	4
Spain (Promusicae)	7
Spain Airplay (Top 40 Radio)	26
Switzerland (Schweizer Hitparade)	13
Switzerland Airplay (Swiss Hitparade)	16
Ukraine Airplay (TopHit)	78
UK Singles (Official Charts)	4
UK Airplay (Music Week)	41

=== Year-end charts ===
2004 year-end chart performance for "Curtain Falls"
Chart (2004)	Position
CIS Airplay (TopHit)	29
Italy (FIMI)	28
Russia Airplay (TopHit)	15
UK Singles (OCC)	110

2005 year-end chart performance for "Curtain Falls"
Chart (2005)	Position
Russia Airplay (TopHit)	95
Taiwan (Hito Radio)	51

== Release history ==
Release dates and formats for "Curtain Falls"
Region	Date	Format(s)	Label(s)	Ref.
United Kingdom	8 November 2004	CD	Virgin; Innocent	
Japan	15 November 2004	CD	Virgin; Innocent	
