= Guilty (Blue song) =

2003 single by Blue

Single by Blue

from the album Guilty
- B-side: "Too Close"; "Rock the Night"; "Back It Up"
- Released: 20 October 2003
- Length: 3:44
- Label: Innocent; Virgin
- Songwriters: Gary Barlow; Eliot Kennedy; Timothy Woodcock; Duncan James
- Producers: True North; Martin Harrington; Ash Howes

Blue singles chronology
"U Make Me Wanna" (2003)	"Guilty" (2003)	"Signed, Sealed, Delivered I'm Yours" (2003)

Music video
- "Guilty" on YouTube

"Guilty" is a song by British boy band Blue from their third album, Guilty. It was co-written by Gary Barlow of the British boy band Take That. Released as a single on 20 October 2003, "Guilty" peaked at No. 2 on the UK Singles Chart and entered the top 40 in several other countries, including Denmark, where it debuted at No. 1.

== Track listings ==
UK CD1

1. "Guilty"
2. "Too Close"

UK CD2

1. "Guilty" – 3:44
2. "Rock the Night" – 3:21
3. "Back It Up" – 3:29
4. "Guilty" (video) – 3:44

UK DVD single

1. "Guilty" (video) – 3:44
2. "Back It Up" (picture gallery) – 3:21
3. "Guilty Instrumental" (picture gallery) – 3:29

Japanese CD single

1. "Guilty"
2. "Rock the Night"
3. "Back It Up"

== Credits and personnel ==
Credits are taken from the UK CD2 liner notes.

- Gary Barlow – writing
- Eliot Kennedy – writing
- Timothy Woodcock – writing
- Duncan James – writing
- Blue – all vocals
- John Themis – guitar
- True North – production
- Martin Harrington – production
- Ash Howes – production, mixing
- Reece Gilmore – programming
- Simon Hale – string arrangement, conductor
- Gavyn Wright – concertmaster

== Charts ==
=== Weekly charts ===
Chart (2003–2004)	Peak position
Australia (ARIA)	29
Austria (Ö3 Austria Top 40)	20
Belgium (Ultratop 50 Flanders)	19
Belgium (Ultratip Bubbling Under Wallonia)	2
CIS Airplay (TopHit)	48
Czech Republic (Rádio Top 100)	2
Denmark (Tracklisten)	1
Denmark Airplay (Tracklisten)	16
Europe (Eurochart Hot 100)	3
Europe (European Hit Radio)	7
France (SNEP)	37
France Airplay (SNEP)	10
Germany (GfK)	19
Greece (IFPI)	13
Hungary (Rádiós Top 40)	37
Hungary (Single Top 40)	3
Ireland (IRMA)	4
Italy (FIMI)	6
Italy (Musica e dischi)	5
Netherlands (Dutch Top 40)	17
Netherlands (Single Top 100)	11
New Zealand (Recorded Music NZ)	14
Romania (Romanian Top 100)	9
Russia Airplay (TopHit)	36
Scottish Singles Sales (Official Charts)	2
Spain (Promusicae)	2
Spain Airplay (Top 40 Radio)	22
Sweden (Sverigetopplistan)	16
Switzerland (Schweizer Hitparade)	22
UK Singles (Official Charts)	2
UK Airplay (Music Week)	7

=== Year-end charts ===
Chart (2003)	Position
CIS (TopHit)	62
Europe (European Hit Radio)	81
Ireland (IRMA)	89
Russia Airplay (TopHit)	42
Taiwan (Hito Radio)	7
UK Singles (OCC)	51

Chart (2005)	Position
Taiwan (Hito Radio)	14

== Release history ==
Region	Date	Format(s)	Label(s)	Ref.
United Kingdom	20 October 2003	CD	Innocent; Virgin	
Japan	29 October 2003	CD	Innocent; Virgin	
Australia	3 November 2003	CD	Innocent; Virgin	
