= If You Come Back =

2001 single by Blue

Single by Blue

from the album All Rise
- Released: 12 November 2001
- Studio: Ruffland, Stanley House (London, England)
- Length: 3:27
- Label: Virgin; Innocent
- Songwriters: Ray Ruffin; Nicole Formescu; Ian Hope; Lee Brennan
- Producer: Ray Ruffin

Blue singles chronology
"Too Close" (2001)	"If You Come Back" (2001)	"Fly By II" (2002)

Music video
- "If You Come Back" on YouTube

"If You Come Back" is a song by English boy band Blue, released as the third single from their debut studio album, All Rise (2001). It was written by Ray Ruffin, Nicole Formescu, Ian Hope, and Lee Brennan of boy band 911. The song topped the UK Singles Chart for one week, becoming Blue's second consecutive number-one single, and has been certified gold in the UK for sales and streaming figures exceeding 400,000 units, as of June 2025.

== Background ==
"If You Come Back" was written by Ray Ruffin, Nicole Formescu, Ian Hope, and Lee Brennan and produced by Ruffin. The song was the first track Blue recorded for their debut album.

== Music video ==
A music video for "If You Come Back" was directed by Si & Ad.

== Track listings ==
UK CD single

1. "If You Come Back" (radio edit) – 3:27
2. "If You Come Back" (8 Jam Streetmix) – 4:56
3. "If You Come Back" (Blacksmith Smooth RnB rub) – 3:54
4. "If You Come Back" (video) – 3:24

UK cassette single and European CD single

1. "If You Come Back" (radio edit) – 3:27
2. "If You Come Back" (The Playa's mix) – 3:57

Australian CD single

1. "If You Come Back" (radio edit)
2. "If You Come Back" (8 Jam Streetmix)
3. "If You Come Back" (Blacksmith Smooth RnB rub)
4. "Too Close" (live from Rumba, Melbourne)
5. "If You Come Back" (video)

Japanese CD single

1. "If You Come Back"
2. "Sorry Seems to Be the Hardest Word" (featuring Elton John—radio edit)
3. "Sorry Seems to Be the Hardest Word" (featuring Elton John—Ruffin Ready Soul mix)
4. "Album Medley"
5. "Sorry Seems to Be the Hardest Word" (featuring Elton John—studio version video)
6. "Sorry Seems to Be the Hardest Word" (featuring Elton John—TV version)

== Credits and personnel ==
Credits are taken from the All Rise album booklet.

Studios

- Recorded at Ruffland Studios and Stanley House Studios (London, England)
- Mixed at Stanley House Studios (London, England)
- Mastered at Sterling Sound (New York City) and Sony Music Studios (London, England)

Personnel

- Ray Ruffin – writing, backing vocals, bass, keys, programming, production
- Nicole Formescu – writing
- Ian Hope – writing
- Lee Brennan – writing
- Blue – lead vocals, backing vocals
- Andrew Smith – guitar
- Damien Egan – acoustic guitars, keys, programming
- Phil Hudson – acoustic guitars
- Ned Douglas – additional beats
- Pete Craigie – additional production and mix
- Stevie Lange – additional vocal production
- Dan Porter – assistant engineering
- Adrian Hall – assistant engineering
- Tom Coyne – mastering
- John Davis – mastering

== Charts ==
=== Weekly charts ===
Chart (2001–2002)	Peak position
Australia (ARIA)	19
Australian Urban (ARIA)	7
Austria (Ö3 Austria Top 40)	49
Belgium (Ultratop 50 Flanders)	9
Belgium (Ultratip Bubbling Under Wallonia)	18
Czech Republic (IFPI)	9
Denmark Airplay (Tracklisten)	6
Europe (Eurochart Hot 100)	13
Europe (European Hit Radio)	24
Germany (GfK)	48
Ireland (IRMA)	13
Italy Airplay (Music & Media)	12
New Zealand (Recorded Music NZ)	5
Poland Airplay (PiF PaF)	7
Scottish Singles Sales (Official Charts)	2
Sweden (Sverigetopplistan)	13
Switzerland (Schweizer Hitparade)	71
UK Singles (Official Charts)	1
UK Airplay (Music Week)	5
UK Hip Hop/R&B (Official Charts)	1

=== Year-end charts ===
Chart (2001)	Position
UK Singles (OCC)	50

Chart (2002)	Position
New Zealand (RIANZ)	43
Sweden (Hitlistan)	97
Taiwan (Hito Radio)	69

== Certifications and sales ==
Region	Certification	Certified units/sales
United Kingdom (BPI)	Gold	400,000^{‡}
^{‡} Sales+streaming figures based on certification alone.

== Release history ==
Region	Date	Format(s)	Label(s)	Ref.
United Kingdom	12 November 2001	CD; cassette	Virgin; Innocent	
Australia	4 March 2002	CD	Virgin; Innocent	
Japan	16 January 2003	CD	Virgin; Innocent	
