= All Rise (song) =

2001 single by Blue

Single by Blue

from the album All Rise
- Released: 21 May 2001
- Studio: StarGate (Norway)
- Genre: Pop; R&B
- Length: 3:43
- Label: Innocent; Virgin
- Songwriters: Mikkel SE; Hallgeir Rustan; Tor Erik Hermansen; Simon Webbe; Daniel Stephens
- Producer: StarGate

Blue singles chronology
"All Rise" (2001)	"Too Close" (2001)

Music video
- "All Rise" on YouTube

"All Rise" is a song by English boy band Blue. It was released on 21 May 2001 as the lead single from their debut album of the same name. "All Rise" was co-written and produced by Norwegian production team StarGate, who went on to produce several of Blue's biggest hits from 2001 to 2003. The song contains elements from the theme from The Pinchcliffe Grand Prix (1975), composed by Bent Fabricius-Bjerre. StarGate had previously used the sample in their production of "Not for the Dough" (1999) by Norwegian hip hop group Multicyde.

"All Rise" became a hit worldwide, peaking at number four in the United Kingdom, number three in Australia, number one in New Zealand, and number 15 in Ireland. The single has received a platinum certification in the UK for sales and streams of over 600,000 units and also went gold in New Zealand. In Australia, the song received a platinum certification for sales exceeding 70,000 copies. The band performed the song during the first series of The Big Reunion in 2013.

== Background ==
The song uses a courtroom as a metaphor for revealing evidence of a significant other doing the narrator wrong. When the time came to release Blue's debut single, their record company said that it wanted to bring out "All Rise", which surprised the band themselves. Duncan James stated that Blue thought this was "the weakest song that we did", but then discovered that the track they recorded in the studio had been transformed, with the use of a harmonica and an increased tempo. Antony Costa said that the production team had "completely flipped" the song. James later commented on the song: "When we went to Norway to record "All Rise," the producers wanted us to sing it very tough and staccato over this hardcore, techno, Europop beat. When we heard the finished version, it was nothing like we’d recorded; it became a worldwide hit and started Bluemania."

== Music video ==
The music video was directed by Andy Morahan and filmed on 30 March 2001 in a sparsely-furnished darkened room. The band sit on stools and walk around while ceiling lights shine down on them, and flash lights appear behind them, as they sing the song with microphones. The principal scene is intercut with shots of with individual band members in a brightly lit room with silver poles.

== Controversy ==
In 2007, Chinese vocal duo Phoenix Legend were accused of plagiarising "All Rise" for their hit song "On the Moon"/"Above the Moonlight". The duo disputed this claim, and alleged that their lyrics were written in 1999.

== Track listings ==
UK and Australian CD single

1. "All Rise" (radio version) – 3:43
2. "All Rise" (Blacksmith RnB radio rub mix) – 4:12
3. "All Rise" (Blacksmith RnB club rub) – 5:11
4. "All Rise" (video) – 3:50

UK cassette single and European CD single

1. "All Rise" (radio version) – 3:43
2. "All Rise" (Blacksmith RnB radio rub mix) – 4:12

Canadian CD single

1. "All Rise" (radio mix) – 3:43
2. "All Rise" (rapless) – 3:33
3. "All Rise" (Blacksmith RnB radio rub mix) – 4:12
4. "All Rise" (Blacksmith RnB club rub) – 5:11

== Credits and personnel ==
Credits are taken from the All Rise album booklet.

Studios

- Recorded at mixed at StarGate Studios (Norway)
- Mastered at Sterling Sound (New York City) and Sony Music Studios (London, England)

Personnel

- StarGate – production
  - Mikkel SE – writing, instruments
  - Hallgeir Rustan – writing, instruments
  - Tor Erik Hermansen – writing, instruments
- Simon Webbe – writing
- Daniel Stephens – writing
- Blue – vocals
- Tom Coyne – mastering
- John Davis – mastering

== Charts ==
=== Weekly charts ===
Weekly chart performance for "All Rise"
Chart (2001–2002)	Peak position
Australia (ARIA)	3
Australian Urban (ARIA)	1
Austria (Ö3 Austria Top 40)	15
Belgium (Ultratop 50 Flanders)	2
Belgium (Ultratip Bubbling Under Wallonia)	4
Canada (Nielsen Soundscan)	11
Denmark (Tracklisten)	4
Europe (Eurochart Hot 100)	20
Europe (European Hit Radio)	26
France (SNEP)	14
France Airplay (SNEP)	9
Germany (GfK)	19
Hungary (Mahasz)	3
Ireland (IRMA)	15
Netherlands (Single Top 100)	70
New Zealand (Recorded Music NZ)	1
Norway (VG-lista)	3
Scottish Singles Sales (Official Charts)	7
Spain Airplay (Top 40 Radio)	33
Sweden (Sverigetopplistan)	3
Switzerland (Schweizer Hitparade)	22
UK Singles (Official Charts)	4
UK Airplay (Music Week)	9
UK Hip Hop/R&B (Official Charts)	2

=== Year-end charts ===
2001 year-end chart performance for "All Rise"
Chart (2001)	Position
Australia (ARIA)	22
Australian Urban (ARIA)	9
Belgium (Ultratop 50 Flanders)	13
Europe (Eurochart Hot 100)	77
Europe (European Hit Radio)	63
Germany (Media Control)	98
Ireland (IRMA)	77
New Zealand (RIANZ)	17
Sweden (Hitlistan)	52
UK Singles (OCC)	44
UK Airplay (Music Week)	50

2002 year-end chart performance for "All Rise"
Chart (2002)	Position
Canada (Nielsen SoundScan)	101
Taiwan (Hito Radio)	11

== Certifications ==
Certifications and sales for "All Rise"
Region	Certification	Certified units/sales
Australia (ARIA)	Platinum	70,000^{^}
Belgium (BRMA)	Gold	25,000^{*}
Denmark (IFPI Danmark)	Gold	45,000^{‡}
France (SNEP)	Gold	250,000^{*}
New Zealand (RMNZ)	Platinum	30,000^{‡}
Norway (IFPI Norway)	Gold	
Sweden (GLF)	Gold	15,000^{^}
United Kingdom (BPI)	Platinum	600,000^{‡}
^{*} Sales figures based on certification alone.^{^} Shipments figures based on certification alone.^{‡} Sales+streaming figures based on certification alone.

== Release history ==
Release dates and formats for "All Rise"
Region	Date	Format(s)	Label(s)	Ref.
United Kingdom	21 May 2001	12-inch vinyl; CD; cassette	Innocent; Virgin	
Australia	2 July 2001	CD	Innocent; Virgin	
New Zealand	6 August 2001	CD; cassette	Innocent; Virgin	
Canada	11 December 2001	CD	Popular	
