= One Love (Blue song) =

2002 single by Blue

Single by Blue

from the album One Love
- B-side: "Get Ready"
- Released: 21 October 2002
- Studio: StarGate (Norway)
- Genre: R&B
- Length: 3:25
- Label: Innocent; Virgin
- Songwriters: Mikkel SE; Hallgeir Rustan; Tor Erik Hermansen; Antony Costa; Duncan James; Lee Ryan; Simon Webbe
- Producer: StarGate

Blue singles chronology
"Best in Me" (2002)	"One Love" (2002)	"Sorry Seems to Be the Hardest Word" (2002)

Music video
- "One Love" on YouTube

"One Love" is a song by English boy band Blue. Co-written by the band and StarGate, who also produced the track, it was released in the United Kingdom on 21 October 2002 as the lead single from their second studio album, One Love (2002). It reached number three on the UK Singles Chart and entered the top 10 in Denmark, Ireland, Italy, and New Zealand. "One Love" has received a gold certification from the British Phonographic Industry (BPI), representing sales and streams of at least 400,000 units in the UK as of July 2023. The song's music video was directed by Cameron Casey.

== Chart performance ==
The song was a hit in the UK, peaking at number three. The song also entered the top five in Ireland (number four) and New Zealand (number five). It reached number 36 in Australia, number seven in Denmark, number 24 in Flanders and number nine in Italy.

== Music video ==
A music video for "One Love" was directed by Cameron Casey and filmed over two days on several locations throughout Los Angeles County, California. Some scenes were filmed at the Los Angeles River, between the First and Seventh Street Bridges, where Grease (1978) and many other films have been shot. Webbe brought his brother Duane Bryan to Los Angeles to appear as an extra in the video, but although he shot several scenes, he is only visible for a few seconds. Antony Costa and Duncan James named the video as one of their favorite videos to film.

== Track listings ==
- UK and Japanese CD single
1. "One Love" – 3:25
2. "Get Ready" – 3:23
3. "One Love" (Octave remix) – 3:38
4. "One Love" (video) – 3:25
- UK cassette single and European CD single
1. "One Love" – 3:25
2. "Get Ready" – 3:23
- Australian CD single
1. "One Love"
2. "Get Ready"
3. "One Love" (Octave remix)

== Credits and personnel ==
Credits are taken from the UK CD single liner notes

Studios

- Recorded and mixed at StarGate Studios (Norway)
- Vocals recorded at Metropolis Studios (London, England)
- Additional vocals recorded at Sony Music Studios (London, England)

Personnel

- StarGate – production
  - Mikkel SE – writing, all instruments
  - Hallgeir Rustan – writing, all instruments
  - Tor Erik Hermansen – writing, all instruments
- Neil Tucker – vocal engineering
- Max Dodson – photography
- Blue – all vocals
  - Antony Costa – writing
  - Duncan James – writing
  - Lee Ryan – writing
  - Simon Webbe – writing

== Charts ==
=== Weekly charts ===
2002–2003 weekly chart performance for "One Love"
Chart (2002–2003)	Peak position
Australia (ARIA)	36
Austria (Ö3 Austria Top 40)	53
Belgium (Ultratop 50 Flanders)	24
Belgium (Ultratip Bubbling Under Wallonia)	11
Czech Republic (IFPI)	23
Denmark (Tracklisten)	7
Denmark Airplay (Tracklisten)	18
Europe (Eurochart Hot 100)	13
Europe (European Hit Radio)	15
France (SNEP)	36
Germany (GfK)	54
Greece (IFPI)	28
Hungary (Rádiós Top 40)	33
Ireland (IRMA)	4
Italy (FIMI)	9
Italy (Musica e dischi)	11
Netherlands (Dutch Top 40)	39
Netherlands (Single Top 100)	41
New Zealand (Recorded Music NZ)	5
Poland Airplay (PiF PaF)	10
Romania (Romanian Top 100)	19
Scottish Singles Sales (Official Charts)	4
Sweden (Sverigetopplistan)	21
Switzerland (Schweizer Hitparade)	44
UK Singles (Official Charts)	3
UK Airplay (Music Week)	1
UK Hip Hop/R&B (Official Charts)	3

2013 weekly chart performance for "One Love"
Chart (2013)	Peak position
UK Singles Downloads (OCC	98

2024 weekly chart performance for "One Love"
Chart (2024)	Peak position
India (IMI)	6

=== Year-end charts ===
2002 year-end chart performance for "One Love"
Chart (2002)	Position
Ireland (IRMA)	44
UK Singles (OCC)	45
UK Airplay (Music Week)	25

2003 year-end chart performance for "One Love"
Chart (2003)	Position
Italy (FIMI)	42

== Certifications ==
Certifications for "One Love"
Region	Certification	Certified units/sales
New Zealand (RMNZ)	Gold	15,000^{‡}
United Kingdom (BPI)	Gold	400,000^{‡}
^{‡} Sales+streaming figures based on certification alone.

== Release history ==
Release dates and formats for "One Love"
Region	Date	Format(s)	Label(s)	Ref.
United Kingdom	21 October 2002	CD; cassette	Innocent; Virgin	
Australia	28 October 2002	CD	Innocent; Virgin	
Japan	30 October 2002	CD	Virgin	
