= Too Close (Next song) =

1998 single by Next

- US variant of standard artwork

Single by Next

from the album Rated Next
- Released: January 27, 1998
- Genre: R&B
- Length: 4:20
- Label: Arista
- Songwriters: Kay Gee, Terry Brown, Robert Huggar, Raphael Brown
- Producer: Kay Gee

Next singles chronology
"Butta Love" (1997)	"Too Close" (1998)	"I Still Love You" (1998)

Music video
- "Too Close" on YouTube

"Too Close" is a song by American R&B group Next featuring uncredited vocals from Vee of Koffee Brown. It contains a sample of "Christmas Rappin" by Kurtis Blow and was released on January 27, 1998, as the second single from their debut album, Rated Next (1997). The song reached number one on the US Hot 100 and R&B charts, topping the former for five non-consecutive weeks, and has gone platinum, making it their biggest and best-known hit.

== Composition ==
According to Billboard, on the song "R.L, Terry and Raphael moan and groan about their female dance partner's grindin' and shakin' -- and their respective bulges as a result -- atop a Chicago-style step dance production."

== Critical reception ==
Ralph Tee of Record Mirror gave the song five out of five, writing, "With soulful vocals, floating keyboards and subtle funky guitars, this sounds like a record from a different time and place though it's strangely contemporary. The bassline from Kurtis Blow's "Christmas Rappin'" [from 1979] definitely provides the old school element, and the beats are non-hip-hop-derived straight fours, but the sophisticated accompaniment does not prevent this from being one of the best and crispest new street jams around."

== Charts ==
=== Weekly charts ===
Chart (1998)	Peak position
Australia (ARIA)	12
Belgium (Ultratop 50 Flanders)	44
Belgium (Ultratop 50 Wallonia)	39
Canada (Nielsen SoundScan)	3
Canada Top Singles (RPM)	2
Canada Dance/Urban (RPM)	1
Europe (European Hot 100 Singles)	68
Germany (GfK)	43
Netherlands (Dutch Top 40)	8
Netherlands (Single Top 100)	8
New Zealand (Recorded Music NZ)	1
Scottish Singles Sales (Official Charts)	75
Sweden (Sverigetopplistan)	39
Switzerland (Schweizer Hitparade)	46
UK Singles (Official Charts)	24
UK Dance (Official Charts)	6
UK Hip Hop/R&B (Official Charts)	7
US Billboard Hot 100	1
US Hot R&B Singles (Billboard)	1
US Mainstream Top 40 (Billboard)	5
US Maxi-Singles Sales (Billboard)	4
US Rhythmic Top 40 (Billboard)	1

=== Year-end charts ===
Chart (1998)	Position
Australia (ARIA)	83
Canada Top Singles (RPM)	14
Canada Dance (RPM)	11
Netherlands (Dutch Top 40)	50
Netherlands (Single Top 100)	59
New Zealand (RIANZ)	18
UK Urban (Music Week)	4
US Billboard Hot 100	1
US Hot R&B Singles (Billboard)	1
US Mainstream Top 40 (Billboard)	11
US Maxi-Singles Sales (Billboard)	32
US Rhythmic Top 40 (Billboard)	1

Chart (1999)	Position
US Rhythmic Top 40 (Billboard)	80

=== Decade-end charts ===
Chart (1990–1999)	Position
US Billboard Hot 100	16

=== All-time charts ===
Chart	Position
US Billboard Hot 100	30

== Certifications ==
Region	Certification	Certified units/sales
Australia (ARIA)	Gold	35,000^{^}
New Zealand (RMNZ)	Platinum	10,000^{*}
United Kingdom (BPI)	Silver	200,000^{‡}
United States (RIAA)	Platinum	2,100,000
^{*} Sales figures based on certification alone.^{^} Shipments figures based on certification alone.^{‡} Sales+streaming figures based on certification alone.

== Release history ==
Region	Date	Format(s)	Label(s)	Ref.
United States	January 27, 1998	12-inch vinyl; CD; cassette	Arista	
United States	March 10, 1998	Contemporary hit radio	Arista	
United Kingdom	May 25, 1998	12-inch vinyl; CD; cassette	Arista	

== Blue version ==
"Too Close"

Single by Blue

from the album All Rise
- Released: August 27, 2001
- Studio: Ruffland (London, England), Cutfather & Joe (Copenhagen, Denmark)
- Genre: R&B
- Length: 3:47
- Label: Virgin, Innocent
- Songwriters: Kier Gist, Darren Lighty, Robert Huggar, Raphael Brown, Robert Ford Jr., Denzil Miller, James B. Moore, Kurtis Walker, Larry Smith
- Producer: Ray Ruffin

Blue singles chronology
"All Rise" (2001)	"Too Close" (2001)	"If You Come Back" (2001)

Music video
- "Too Close" on YouTube

In 2001, English boy band Blue released a cover version of the song as the second single from their debut studio album All Rise (2001). The track was released on August 27, 2001, and became their first number one UK single produced by Ray Ruffin. "Too Close" also reached number five in Australia, number 17 in Ireland, and number one in New Zealand, where the Next version had also been a number-one hit. The song has received a silver sales status certification for sales of over 200,000 copies in the UK, as of February 2021.

=== Music video ===
The band traveled to New York City to film the music video, and whilst there, they witnessed the attacks on the World Trade Center. The following month, Blue were being interviewed by British newspaper The Sun and singer Lee Ryan commented that "This New York thing is being blown out of proportion" and asked "What about whales? They are ignoring animals that are more important. Animals need saving and that's more important." The other members of the band tried to silence Ryan, but he went on. After The Sun quoted Ryan as saying "Who gives a fuck about New York when elephants are being killed?", this caused a huge media backlash that resulted in Blue losing their U.S. record deal and campaigns to sack Ryan from the group.

=== Track listings ===
UK and Australian CD single

1. "Too Close" (radio edit) – 3:45
2. "Too Close" (Blacksmith R&B club rub) – 5:41
3. "Too Close" (instrumental) – 3:45
4. "Too Close" (video) – 3:45

UK cassette single and European CD single

1. "Too Close" (radio edit) – 3:45
2. "Too Close" (Blacksmith R&B club rub) – 5:41

=== Credits and personnel ===
Credits are taken from the All Rise album booklet.

Studios

- Recorded at Ruffland Studios (London, England) and Cutfather & Joe Studios (Copenhagen, Denmark)
- Mixed at White Room (Copenhagen, Denmark)
- Mastered at Sterling Sound (New York City) and Sony Music Studios (London, England)

Personnel

- Kier Gist – writing
- Darren Lighty – writing
- Robert Huggar – writing
- Raphael Brown – writing
- Robert Ford Jr. – writing
- Denzil Miller – writing
- James B. Moore – writing
- Kurtis Walker – writing
- Larry Smith – writing
- Blue – lead vocals
- Ray Ruffin – additional backing vocals, keys, programming, production
- Awsa – additional backing vocals
- Andrew Smith – guitars
- Glen Scott – additional keyboards
- Cutfather & Joe – additional keyboards, additional production and mix
- Mads Nilsson – mixing
- Tom Coyne – mastering
- John Davis – mastering

=== Charts ===
==== Weekly charts ====
Chart (2001)	Peak position
Australia (ARIA)	5
Australian Urban (ARIA)	2
Austria (Ö3 Austria Top 40)	72
Belgium (Ultratop 50 Flanders)	6
Belgium (Ultratip Bubbling Under Wallonia)	11
Europe (Eurochart Hot 100)	10
Germany (GfK)	66
Ireland (IRMA)	17
Latvia (Latvijas Top 40)	27
New Zealand (Recorded Music NZ)	1
Norway (VG-lista)	19
Scottish Singles Sales (Official Charts)	2
Sweden (Sverigetopplistan)	41
UK Singles (Official Charts)	1
UK Airplay (Music Week)	4

==== Year-end charts ====
Chart (2001)	Position
Australia (ARIA)	65
Belgium (Ultratop 50 Flanders)	59
UK Singles (OCC)	47

=== Certifications ===
Region	Certification	Certified units/sales
Australia (ARIA)	Platinum	70,000^{^}
United Kingdom (BPI)	Silver	200,000^{^}
^{^} Shipments figures based on certification alone.

=== Release history ===
Region	Date	Format(s)	Label(s)	Ref.
United Kingdom	August 27, 2001	CD; cassette	Virgin; Innocent	
Australia	October 22, 2001	CD	Virgin; Innocent	

== Parodies ==
In 2015, the song regained attention through the popularity of the internet meme, "Why You Always Lying" by Nicholas Fraser. The parody gained fame within social media (most notably Vine and Twitter) because of the comically poor production quality and relatable theme. Replacing the line "Baby when we're grinding" with "Why the fuck you lying," and similarly for following phrases, the song initially referenced an untrustworthy girl who failed to keep her promise of hooking him up with her cute friend. Currently, the original Vine has been viewed over 76.1 million times, and has been extended into a full music video for YouTube, which has gained over 34 million views as of June 2024. Fraser also performed the parody along with the former Next member RL on the MTV2 show Uncommon Sense with Charlamagne.

In 2021, comedian Munya Chawawa posted a parody of the song with lyrics changed to reflect the panic buying of petrol and diesel fuel that occurred across the United Kingdom in September 2021 during the 2021 United Kingdom fuel supply crisis which in turn caused further panic from the British public. The lyrics to the chorus were changed to "Britain’s panic buying/Petrol pumps are dying/Said Brexit would be fine and turns out they were lying/Fuel is running real low/ Need European blokes/ To come through in their HGVs”.
