= Innocent Records =

UK record label

- Parent company: EMI
- Founded: 1997
- Founder: Hugh Goldsmith
- Defunct: 2007
- Genre: Pop
- Country of origin: United Kingdom

Innocent Records was a pop record label created to cater to for EMI's Virgin Records more pop oriented acts. Following the success of the Spice Girls, Virgin Records decided to delve into the pop market. In doing so they poached Hugh Goldsmith from RCA Records (famous for steering Take That's initial flagging sales, to a multi-platinum act). They let him launch his own Virgin Records offshoot. His first signing was Billie Piper, followed by Martine McCutcheon, along with several dance acts. The label continued to thrive well into the mid-2000s with Atomic Kitten and Blue achieving Platinum sales.

In early 2005, Goldsmith returned to Sony BMG (parent company of RCA Records) to set up Brightside Records. Not long after Goldsmith's departure, Innocent Records was shifted from Virgin Records to the newly formed Angel Music Group, EMI's newly created commercial division, which also handles EMI Classics. For a time in the mid-2000s Angel Music Group also licensed Hollywood Records for the UK.

Innocent Records' most notable success during this period was Blue's Simon Webbe's double platinum solo album Sanctuary. The Innocent Records imprint seemed to have vanished by the late 2000s (decade) being replaced by the revived Charisma Records label, itself disappeared after limited success with pop acts such as Alphabeat.

== Former artists ==
- Atomic Kitten (1999–2004)
- Blue (2001–2005)
- Billie Piper (1998–2001)
- Geri Halliwell (2004–2005) (shifted from EMI)
- Speedway (2002–2004)
- Martine McCutcheon (1999–2003)
- Duncan James (Solo) (2004–2007)
- Simon Webbe (Solo) (2005–2007)
- Javine Hylton (2003–2004)
- VS (2004–2005)

== See also ==
- List of record labels
