= List of UK top-ten singles in 2002 =

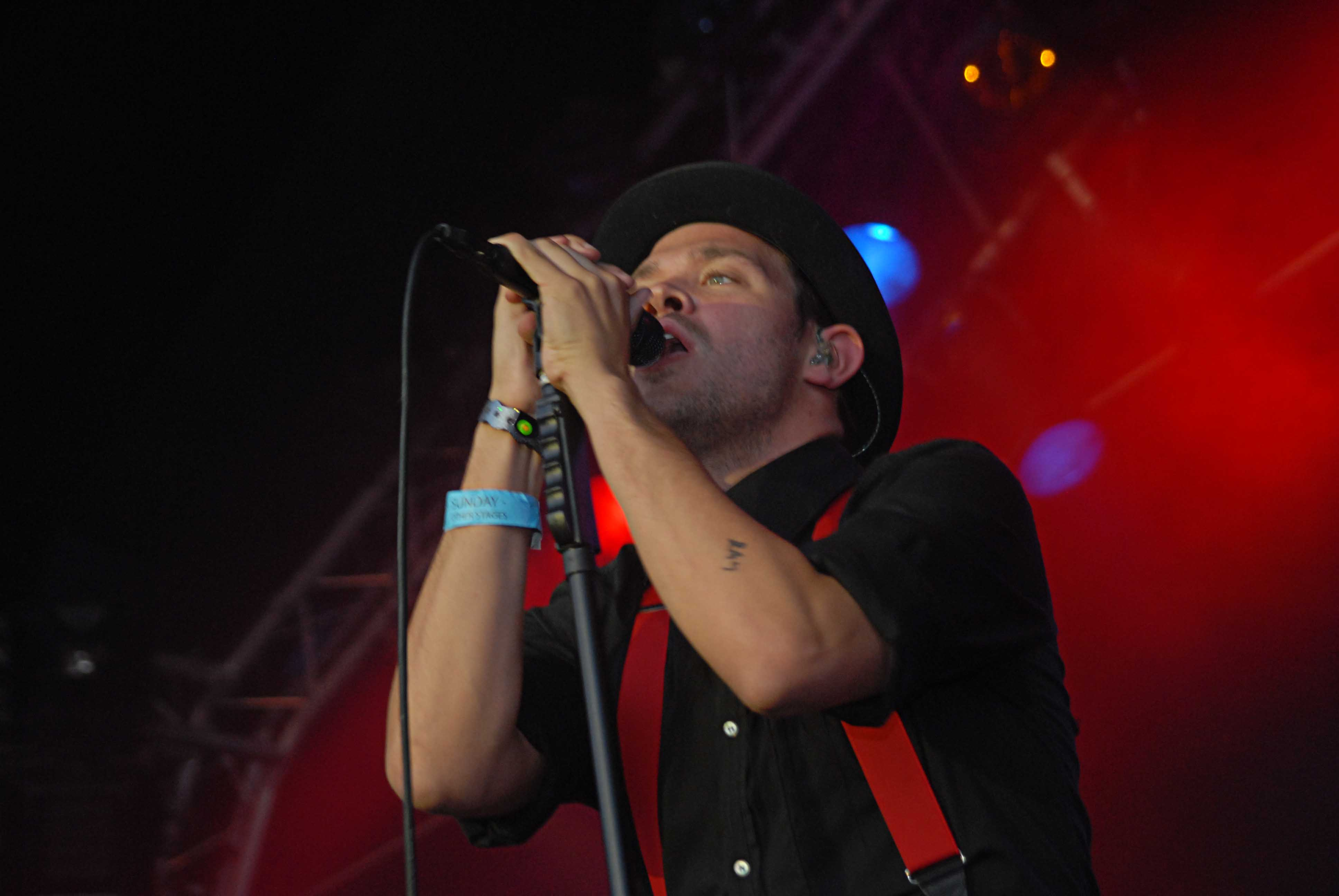
Will Young, the winner of the first series of Pop Idol, had the best-selling single of 2002 with his winner's single "Anything is Possible"/"Evergreen". He also reached number-one with "Light My Fire and the duet with Pop Idol runner-up Gareth Gates, "The Long and Winding Road".

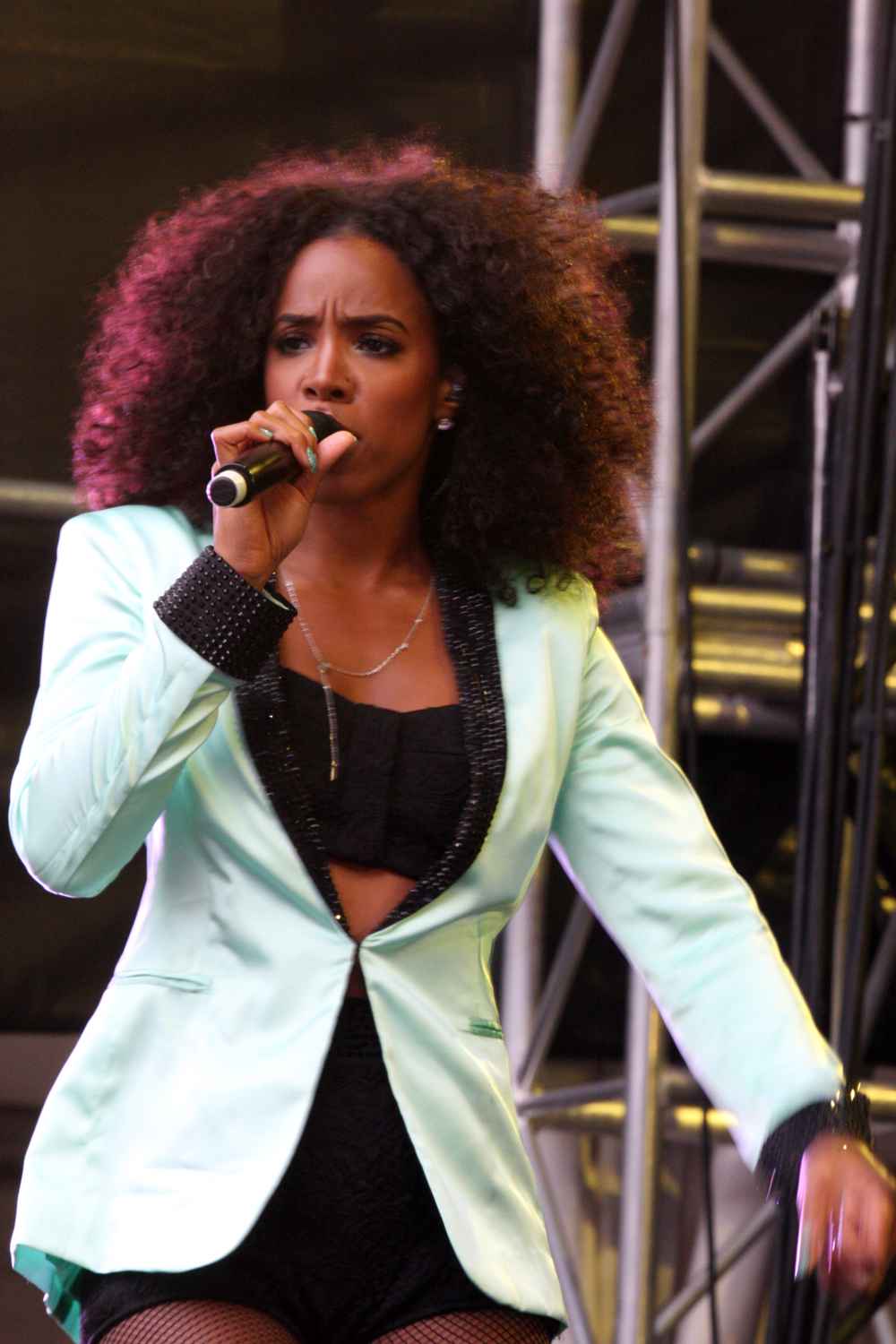
"Dilemma" by Nelly and Kelly Rowland (pictured) reached number-one in October and was the fourth best-selling single of the year.

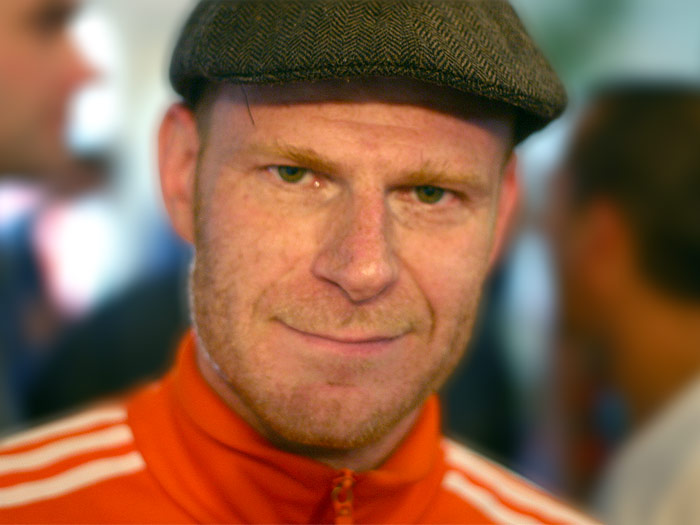
Dutch DJ JXL remixed Elvis Presley's 1968 song A Little Less Conversation for Nike's commercial for the 2002 FIFA World Cup. Released as a single, the remix spent four weeks at number-one in the UK and became the fifth best-selling single of 2002. It later featured on the compilation album ELV1S: 30 No. 1 Hits. The song was re-released in 2005 to mark Presley's 70th birthday and made the UK top 10 again, this time reaching number three.

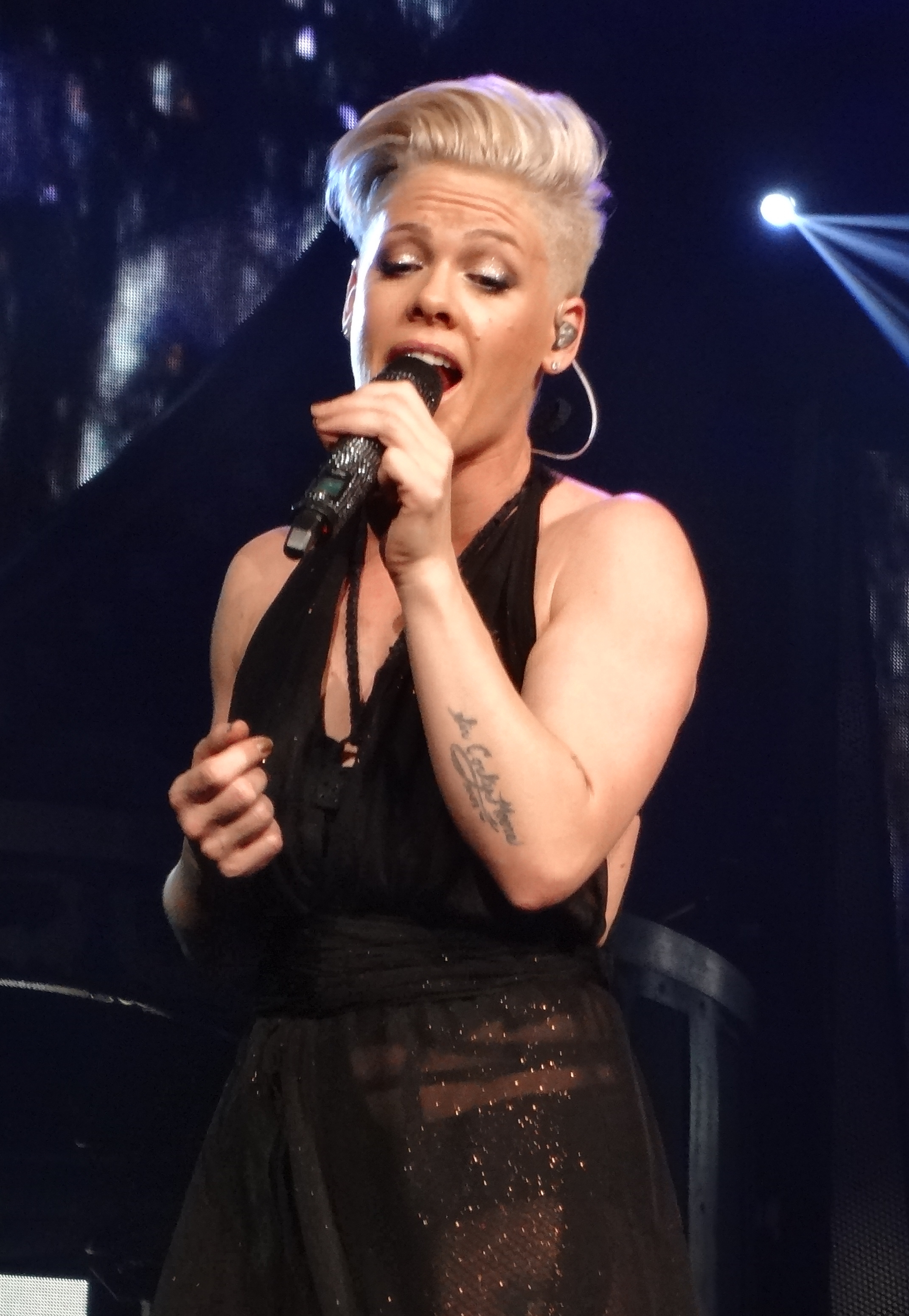
Pink had three UK top 10 singles this year, the highest-charting of which was "Just Like a Pill", which reached number-one in September.

The UK Singles Chart is one of many music charts compiled by the Official Charts Company that calculates the best-selling singles of the week in the United Kingdom. Before 2004, the chart was only based on the sales of physical singles with airplay figures and digital downloads excluded from the official chart. This list shows singles that peaked in the Top 10 of the UK Singles Chart during 2002, as well as singles which peaked in 2001 and 2003 but were in the top 10 in 2002. The entry date is when the single appeared in the top 10 for the first time (week ending, as published by the Official Charts Company, which is six days after the chart is announced).

Two hundred and sixteen singles were in the top ten in 2002. Ten singles from 2001 remained in the top 10 for several weeks at the beginning of the year, while "Sk8er Boi" by Avril Lavigne was released in 2002 but did not reach its peak until 2003. Fifty-one artists scored multiple entries in the top 10 in 2002. Blazin' Squad, Girls Aloud, Busted, Holly Valance, Pharrell Williams and Shakira were among the many artists who achieved their first UK charting top 10 single in 2002.

The 2001 Christmas number-one, "Somethin' Stupid" by Robbie Williams and Nicole Kidman, remained at number-one for the first week of 2002. Daniel Bedingfield's "Gotta Get thru This" returned to number-one in January after previously occupying the top spot for two weeks in December 2001. The first new number-one single of the year was "More Than a Woman" by the late Aaliyah, who was killed in a plane crash in August 2001. Overall, thirty-two different singles peaked at number-one in 2002, with Gareth Gates and Will Young (both 3) having the most singles hit that position.

== Background ==
=== Multiple entries ===
Two hundred and sixteen singles charted in the top 10 in 2002, with two-hundred and five singles reaching their peak this year.

Fifty artists scored multiple entries in the top 10 in 2002. Four artists had the joint most top ten singles in 2002 with four. American singer Ashanti's "Foolish" was her only solo single of her top ten entries, peaking at number four. Of her collaborations, "What's Luv?" with Fat Joe, and "Down 4 U" alongside Irv Gotti, The Inc., Ja Rule, Charlie Baltimore and Vita both reached number four. A fourth hit, "Always on Time" also with Ja Rule reached number six.

Pop Idol winner Will Young and runner-up Gareth Gates both had four top tens in 2002. Young had two number-one hits on his own, including "Anything is Possible"/"Evergreen" and "Light My Fire". His Children in Need single "Don't Let Me Down"/"You and I" just missed out on the top spot, peaking at number two. Young and Gates got together to record a cover of The Beatles song "The Long and Winding Road" which landed at the top spot.

Young's competition rival Gates had three top 10 singles in his own right. Debut single "Unchained Melody" and follow-up "Anyone of Us (Stupid Mistake)" were chart toppers, while a third song, album title track "What My Heart Wants to Say" reached number five. Gates also recorded a version of Elvis Presley's "Suspicious Minds", which featured on "The Long and Winding Road" single as a double-A side.

The final four-time entrants to the top ten this year were S Club Juniors, a spinoff group from the successful S Club 7 (renamed as S Club in March 2002). Beginning with "One Step Closer", which got to number two, they achieved further chart fame as "Automatic High" and "New Direction" equalled that placing. Christmas double single "Puppy Love/Sleigh Ride" rounded off their year, peaking in sixth position.

Rapper Eminem was one of a number of artists with three top-ten entries, including number ones "Without Me" and "Lose Yourself". Atomic Kitten, Daniel Bedingfield, Oasis, Ronan Keating, Sugababes and Westlife were among the other artists who had multiple top 10 entries in 2002.

=== Chart debuts ===
Ninety artists achieved their first top 10 single in 2002, either as a lead or featured artist. Of these, twelve went on to record another hit single that year: Avril Lavigne, Blazin' Squad, Darius, Flip & Fill, Holly Valance, Lasgo, Milk Inc., Moony, Ms. Dynamite, Nickelback, Scooter and Shakira. Three artists achieved two more chart hits in 2002: Chad Kroeger, Christina Milian and H & Claire (as a duo). Ashanti, Gareth Gates, S Club Juniors and Will Young all had three other entries in their breakthrough year.

The following table (collapsed on desktop site) does not include acts who had previously charted as part of a group and secured their first top 10 solo single.

Artist	Number of top 10s	First entry	Chart position	Other entries
Puretone	1	"Addicted to Bass"	2	—
Knoc-turn'al	1	"Bad Intentions"	4	—
DJ Aligator Project	1	"The Whistle Song (Blow My Whistle Bitch)"	5	—
Goldtrix	1	"It's Love (Trippin')"	6	—
Andrea Brown	1	"It's Love (Trippin')"	6	—
Lange	1	"Drifting Away"	9	—
Skye	1	"Drifting Away"	9	—
Christina Milian	3	"AM to PM"	3	"It's All Gravy" (9), "When You Look at Me" (3)
allSTARZ*	1	"The Land of Make Believe"	9	—
Ashanti	4	"Always on Time"	6	"Down 4 U" (4), "Foolish" (4), "What's Luv?" (4)
Flip & Fill	2	"True Love Never Dies"	7	"Shooting Star" (3)
Kaci	1	"I Think I Love You"	10	—
DB Boulevard	1	"Point of View"	3	—
Moony	2	"Point of View"	3	"Dove (I'll Be Loving You)" (9)
Alizée	1	"Moi... Lolita"	9	—
A	1	"Nothing"	9	—
Will Young	4	"Anything Is Possible"/"Evergreen"	1	"Don't Let Me Down"/"You and I" (2), "Light My Fire" (1), "The Long and Winding Road" (1)
Shakira	2	"Whenever, Wherever"	2	"Underneath Your Clothes" (3)
Lasgo	2	"Something"	4	"Alone" (7)
Nickelback	2	"How You Remind Me"	4	"Too Bad" (9)
Chad Kroeger	3	"How You Remind Me"	4	"Hero" (4), "Too Bad" (9)
Beverley Knight	1	"Shoulda Woulda Coulda"	10	—
Rik Waller	1	"I Will Always Love You"	6	—
Platinum 45	1	"Oi!"	7	—
More Fire Crew	1	"Oi!"	7	—
Ali G	1	"Me Julie"	2	—
Gareth Gates	4	"Unchained Melody"	1	"Anyone of Us (Stupid Mistake)" (1), "The Long and Winding Road"/"Suspicious Minds" (1), "What My Heart Wants to Say" (5)
Marilyn Manson	1	"Tainted Love"	5	—
Darren Hayes	1	"Insatiable"	8	—
Shy FX	1	"Shake Ur Body"	7	—
T Power	1	"Shake Ur Body"	7	—
Di	1	"Shake Ur Body"	7	—
The X-Ecutioners	1	"It's Goin' Down"	7	—
X-Press 2	1	"Lazy"	2	—
1 Giant Leap	1	"My Culture"	9	—
Matt Darey	1	"Beautiful"	10	—
Marcella Woods	1	"Beautiful"	10	—
Doves	1	"There Goes the Fear"	3	—
S Club Juniors	4	"One Step Closer"	2	"Automatic High" (2), "New Direction" (2), "Puppy Love"/"Sleigh Ride" (6)
Idlewild	1	"You Held the World in Your Arms"	9	—
Holly Valance	2	"Kiss Kiss"	1	"Down Boy" (2)
Tweet	1	"Oops (Oh My)"	5	—
Shakedown	1	"At Night"	6	—
H & Claire	3	"DJ"	3	"All Out of Love/Beauty and the Beast" (10), "Half a Heart" (8)
Nigel and Marvin	1	"Follow da Leader"	5	—
Russell Watson	1	"Someone Like You"	9	—
Fat Joe	1	"What's Luv?"	4	—
Milk Inc.	2	"In My Eyes"	9	"Walk on Water" (10)
Ms. Dynamite	2	"It Takes More"	7	"Dy-Na-Mi-Tee" (5)
Paffendorf	1	"Be Cool"	7	—
Puddle of Mudd	1	"Blurry"	8	—
JXL	1	"A Little Less Conversation"	1	—
Scooter	2	"Ramp! The Logical Song"	8	"Nessaja" (4)
Josey Scott	1	"Hero"	4	—
The Calling	1	"Wherever You Will Go"	3	—
Alessandro Safina	1	"Your Song"	4	—
Case	1	"Livin' It Up"	5	—
Vanessa Carlton	1	"A Thousand Miles"	6	—
Darius	2	"Colourblind"	1	"Rushes" (5)
Tra-Knox	1	"Black Suits Comin' (Nod Ya Head)"	3	—
Loon	1	"I Need a Girl (Part One)"	4	—
Pharrell Williams	1	"Boys"	7	—
Mad'House	1	"Like a Prayer"	3	—
Bowling for Soup	1	"Girl All the Bad Guys Want"	8	—
Blazin' Squad	2	"Crossroads"	1	"Love on the Line" (6)
Truth Hurts	1	"Addictive"	3	—
Rakim	1	"Addictive"	3	—
Milky	1	"Just the Way You Are"	8	—
Appleton	1	"Fantasy"	2	—
Kelly Osbourne	1	"Papa Don't Preach"	3	—
Sarah Whatmore	1	"When I Lost You"	6	—
Busted	1	"What I Go to School For"	3	—
Aqualung	1	"Strange and Beautiful (I'll Put a Spell on You)"	7	—
Kowdean	1	"Dem Girlz (I Don't Know Why)"	10	—
Avril Lavigne	2	"Complicated"	3	"Sk8er Boi" (8) ^{[A]}
Irv Gotti Presents The Inc.	1	"Down 4 U"	4	—
Charli Baltimore	1	"Down 4 U"	4	—
Vita	1	"Down 4 U"	4	—
Las Ketchup	1	"The Ketchup Song (Aserejé)"	1	—
Big Brovaz	1	"Nu Flow"	3	—
Badly Drawn Boy	1	"You Were Right"	9	—
DJ Sammy	1	"Heaven"	1	—
Yanou	1	"Heaven"	1	—
Do	1	"Heaven"	1	—
Redman	1	"Dirrty"	1	—
Liam Lynch	1	"United States of Whatever"	10	—
The Cheeky Girls	1	"Cheeky Song (Touch My Bum)"	2	—
Girls Aloud	1	"Sound of the Underground"	1	—
One True Voice	1	"Sacred Trust"/"After You're Gone"	2	—
Love Inc.	1	"You're a Superstar"	7	—

Notes

Darren Hayes was one of the participants on the Artists Against AIDS Worldwide (known as All Star Tribute in the UK) charity single "What's Going On" which reached number six in 2001, but "Insatiable" was his first official credited top 10 single. H & Claire performed together as a duo for the first time in 2002, reaching the top 10 on three occasions during the year. They had both been members of the 1990s-formed pop group Steps. Bandmate Faye Tozer had her only single outside Steps in 2002, featuring on Russell Watson's "Someone Like You", which reached number ten.

Chad Kroeger had his first two top 10 singles as part of Nickelback in 2002, and also had a solo hit with "Hero". Beyoncé secured her first top 10 hit independent of Destiny's Child with "Work It Out", placing at number 7. Kelly Rowland also went solo in 2002, scoring a number-one hit with Nelly on "Dilemma".

Abs had eleven top 10 singles with Five between 1997 and 2001, but "What You Got" marked his solo debut. Nicole and Natalie Appleton had multiple chart hits with All Saints but appeared in the chart for the first time in 2002 as a duo.

Irv Gotti had his first official credit as an artist in 2002 on "Down 4 U" but he had made the top 10 previously as a producer. John Otway featured on The Crowd's charity single "You'll Never Walk Alone" in 1985, reaching number one. "Bunsen Burner" marked his return to the chart and his only solo top 10 hit. Ja Rule participated on the charity single "What's Going On" in 2001 but the collaboration with Ashanti, "Always on Time", was her first official lead credit. Justin Timberlake launched his solo career in 2002 with "Like I Love You", leaving NSync after their last single together, "Girlfriend".

=== Songs from films ===
Original songs from various films entered the top 10 throughout the year. These included "Bad Intentions" (from The Wash), "World of Our Own" (You Wish!), "The World's Greatest" (Ali), "Me Julie" (Ali G Indahouse), "I'm Not a Girl, Not Yet a Woman" (Crossroads), "Hero" (Spider-Man), "Here I Am" (Spirit: Stallion of the Cimarron), "Boys" and "Work It Out" (Austin Powers in Goldmember), "Livin' It Up" (Friday After Next), "Black Suits Comin' (Nod Ya Head)" (Men in Black II), "Die Another Day" (Die Another Day), "What's Your Flava?" (What a Girl Wants) and "Lose Yourself" (8 Mile).

=== Charity singles ===
A number of singles recorded for charity reached the top 10 in the charts in 2002. The Sport Relief single was a new version of Elton John's "Your Song", featuring Italian tenor Alessandro Safina alongside John, peaking at number four on 27 July 2002.

Will Young recorded the Children in Need single for 2002, the double-A side "Don't Let Me Down"/"You and I". It was his fourth successive top 2 single and reached number two on 30 November 2002.

=== Best-selling singles ===
Will Young had the best-selling single of the year with "Anything is Possible"/"Evergreen", his first recording after beating Gareth Gates to the Pop Idol title. The single spent six weeks in the top 10 (including three weeks at number one), sold almost 1.8 million copies and was certified 3× platinum by the BPI. Gates' "Unchained Melody" came in second place, selling over 1.3 million copies and losing out by around 400,000 sales. Enrique Iglesias's "Hero", "Dilemma" from Nelly & Kelly Rowland, and "A Little Less Conversation" by Elvis vs. JXL made up the top five. Singles by Gareth Gates ("Anyone of Us (Stupid Mistake)"), Las Ketchup, Shakira, Liberty X and Eminem were also in the top ten best-selling singles of the year.

"Anything is Possible"/"Evergreen" was ranked as the best-selling single of the decade, while "Unchained Melody" (2) also ranked in the top 10 best-selling singles of the 2000s.

== Top-ten singles ==
Symbol	Meaning
‡	Single peaked in 2001 but still in chart in 2002.
♦	Single released in 2002 but peaked in 2003.
(#)	Year-end top-ten single position and rank
Entered	The date that the single first appeared in the chart.
Peak	Highest position that the single reached in the UK Singles Chart.

Entered (week ending)	Weeks in top 10	Single	Artist	Peak	Peak reached (week ending)	Weeks at peak
Singles in 2001
1 December 2001	7	"Have You Ever" ‡ ^{[B]}	S Club 7	1	1 December 2001	1
8 December 2001	8	"Gotta Get Thru This" ‡	Daniel Bedingfield	1	8 December 2001	3
8 December 2001	4	"What If" ‡	Kate Winslet	6	8 December 2001	1
15 December 2001	6	"Murder on the Dancefloor" ‡	Sophie Ellis-Bextor	2	15 December 2001	2
15 December 2001	6	"Handbags and Gladrags" ‡	Stereophonics	4	15 December 2001	2
15 December 2001	5	"Country Roads" ‡	Hermes House Band	7	15 December 2001	1
22 December 2001	4	"Somethin' Stupid" ‡	Robbie Williams & Nicole Kidman	1	22 December 2001	3
22 December 2001	4	"Will I?" ‡	Ian Van Dahl	5	22 December 2001	1
22 December 2001	4	"Lately" ‡	Samantha Mumba	6	22 December 2001	2
29 December 2001	2	"How Wonderful You Are" ‡	Gordon Haskell	2	29 December 2001	1
Singles in 2002
12 January 2002	1	"Drowning"	Backstreet Boys	4	12 January 2002	1
19 January 2002	2	"More Than a Woman"	Aaliyah	1	19 January 2002	1
19 January 2002	6	"Addicted to Bass"	Puretone	2	19 January 2002	1
19 January 2002	2	"Bad Intentions"	Dr. Dre featuring Knoc-turn'al	4	19 January 2002	1
19 January 2002	2	"The Whistle Song (Blow My Whistle Bitch)"	DJ Aligator Project	5	19 January 2002	1
19 January 2002	1	"It's Love (Trippin')"	Goldtrix presents Andrea Brown	6	19 January 2002	1
19 January 2002	1	"Haters"	So Solid Crew	8	19 January 2002	1
19 January 2002	1	"Drifting Away"	Lange featuring Skye	9	19 January 2002	1
26 January 2002	3	"My Sweet Lord" ^{[C]}	George Harrison	1	26 January 2002	1
26 January 2002	6	"Get the Party Started"	Pink	2	26 January 2002	2
26 January 2002	3	"AM to PM"	Christina Milian	3	26 January 2002	1
26 January 2002	1	"Star Guitar"	The Chemical Brothers	8	26 January 2002	1
26 January 2002	1	"The Land of Make Believe"	allSTARS*	9	26 January 2002	1
2 February 2002	8	"Hero" (#3)	Enrique Iglesias	1	2 February 2002	4
2 February 2002	3	"Caught in the Middle"	A1	2	2 February 2002	1
2 February 2002	3	"Overprotected"	Britney Spears	4	9 February 2002	1
2 February 2002	4	"Always on Time"	Ja Rule featuring Ashanti	6	2 February 2002	3
2 February 2002	3	"True Love Never Dies"	Flip & Fill featuring Kelly Llorenna	7	2 February 2002	2
2 February 2002	1	"Crazy Rap"	Afroman	10	2 February 2002	1
9 February 2002	1	"I Think I Love You"	Kaci	10	9 February 2002	1
16 February 2002	2	"Hey Baby"	No Doubt	2	16 February 2002	1
16 February 2002	1	"Movies"	Alien Ant Farm	5	16 February 2002	1
16 February 2002	1	"So Lonely"	Jakatta	8	16 February 2002	1
23 February 2002	3	"You"	S Club 7	2	23 February 2002	1
23 February 2002	2	"Point of View"	DB Boulevard	3	23 February 2002	1
23 February 2002	2	"What About Us?"	Brandy	4	23 February 2002	1
23 February 2002	1	"A Mind of Its Own"	Victoria Beckham	6	23 February 2002	1
23 February 2002	1	"Moi... Lolita"	Alizée	9	23 February 2002	1
2 March 2002	3	"World of Our Own"	Westlife	1	2 March 2002	1
2 March 2002	2	"In Your Eyes"	Kylie Minogue	3	2 March 2002	1
2 March 2002	3	"The World's Greatest"	R. Kelly	4	2 March 2002	1
2 March 2002	1	"B with Me"	Mis-Teeq	5	2 March 2002	1
2 March 2002	1	"Nothing"	A	9	2 March 2002	1
9 March 2002	6	"Anything is Possible"/"Evergreen" (#1)	Will Young	1	9 March 2002	3
9 March 2002	10	"Whenever, Wherever" (#7)	Shakira	2	9 March 2002	2
9 March 2002	5	"Something"	Lasgo	4	9 March 2002	1
9 March 2002	11	"How You Remind Me"	Nickelback	4	16 March 2002	2
9 March 2002	1	"Shoulda Woulda Coulda"	Beverley Knight	10	9 March 2002	1
16 March 2002	1	"I Will Always Love You"	Rik Waller	6	16 March 2002	1
16 March 2002	1	"Oi!"	Platinum 45 featuring More Fire Crew	8	16 March 2002	1
16 March 2002	1	"Caramel"	City High featuring Eve	9	16 March 2002	1
23 March 2002	6	"Me Julie"	Ali G & Shaggy	2	23 March 2002	2
23 March 2002	1	"Ain't It Funny (Murder Remix)"	Jennifer Lopez featuring Ja Rule & Caddillac Tah	4	23 March 2002	1
23 March 2002	1	"A New Day Has Come"	Celine Dion	7	23 March 2002	1
23 March 2002	1	"Run to the Hills (Live 2001)" ^{[D]}	Iron Maiden	9	23 March 2002	1
23 March 2002	1	"Wrong Impression"	Natalie Imbruglia	10	23 March 2002	1
30 March 2002	6	"Unchained Melody" (#2)	Gareth Gates	1	30 March 2002	4
30 March 2002	3	"Tainted Love"	Marilyn Manson	5	30 March 2002	1
30 March 2002	3	"Fly By II"	Blue	6	30 March 2002	1
30 March 2002	1	"Freeek!"	George Michael	7	30 March 2002	1
30 March 2002	1	"Insatiable"	Darren Hayes	8	30 March 2002	1
6 April 2002	5	"4 My People"	Missy Elliott featuring Eve	5	6 April 2002	1
6 April 2002	1	"Shake Ur Body"	Shy FX & T Power featuring Di	7	6 April 2002	1
13 April 2002	3	"I'm Not a Girl, Not Yet a Woman"	Britney Spears	2	13 April 2002	1
13 April 2002	1	"It's Goin' Down"	The X-Ecutioners	7	13 April 2002	1
20 April 2002	4	"Lazy"	X-Press 2 featuring David Byrne	2	20 April 2002	1
20 April 2002	1	"One Step Too Far"	Faithless featuring Dido	6	20 April 2002	1
20 April 2002	1	"My Culture"	1 Giant Leap	9	20 April 2002	1
20 April 2002	1	"Beautiful"	Matt Darey featuring Marcella Woods	10	20 April 2002	1
27 April 2002	2	"The Hindu Times"	Oasis	1	27 April 2002	1
27 April 2002	4	"Girlfriend"	NSYNC featuring Nelly	2	27 April 2002	1
27 April 2002	1	"There Goes the Fear"	Doves	3	27 April 2002	1
4 May 2002	4	"Freak Like Me"	Sugababes	1	4 May 2002	1
4 May 2002	4	"One Step Closer"	S Club Juniors	2	4 May 2002	2
4 May 2002	1	"You Held the World in Your Arms"	Idlewild	9	4 May 2002	1
11 May 2002	6	"Kiss Kiss"	Holly Valance	1	11 May 2002	1
11 May 2002	2	"Oops (Oh My)"	Tweet featuring Missy Elliott	5	11 May 2002	1
11 May 2002	1	"At Night"	Shakedown	6	11 May 2002	1
11 May 2002	1	"No More Drama"	Mary J. Blige	9	11 May 2002	1
18 May 2002	6	"If Tomorrow Never Comes"	Ronan Keating	1	18 May 2002	1
18 May 2002	1	"DJ"	H & Claire	3	18 May 2002	1
18 May 2002	2	"Follow da Leader"	Nigel and Marvin	5	18 May 2002	1
18 May 2002	1	"Someone Like You"	Russell Watson & Faye Tozer	10	18 May 2002	1
25 May 2002	7	"Just a Little" (#9)	Liberty X	1	25 May 2002	1
25 May 2002	3	"Escape"	Enrique Iglesias	3	25 May 2002	1
25 May 2002	3	"What's Luv?"	Fat Joe featuring Ashanti	4	25 May 2002	1
25 May 2002	1	"Don't Let Me Get Me"	Pink	6	25 May 2002	1
25 May 2002	1	"In My Eyes"	Milk Inc.	9	25 May 2002	1
1 June 2002	7	"Without Me" (#10)	Eminem	1	1 June 2002	1
1 June 2002	3	"It's OK!"	Atomic Kitten	3	1 June 2002	1
1 June 2002	1	"Bop Bop Baby"	Westlife	5	1 June 2002	1
1 June 2002	1	"It Takes More"	Ms. Dynamite	7	1 June 2002	1
1 June 2002	1	"Reason"	Ian Van Dahl	8	1 June 2002	1
8 June 2002	3	"Light My Fire"	Will Young	1	8 June 2002	2
8 June 2002	3	"We're on the Ball"	Ant & Dec	3	8 June 2002	1
8 June 2002	1	"Hey Baby (Unofficial World Cup Remix)"	DJ Ötzi	10	8 June 2002	1
15 June 2002	1	"Be Cool"	Paffendorf	7	15 June 2002	1
15 June 2002	1	"Blurry"	Puddle of Mudd	8	15 June 2002	1
15 June 2002	1	"Dove (I'll Be Loving You)"	Moony	9	15 June 2002	1
22 June 2002	6	"A Little Less Conversation" (#5)	Elvis vs. JXL	1	22 June 2002	4
22 June 2002	2	"Love at First Sight"	Kylie Minogue	2	22 June 2002	1
22 June 2002	1	"Get Over You"/"Move This Mountain"	Sophie Ellis-Bextor	3	22 June 2002	1
22 June 2002	4	"Hero"	Chad Kroeger featuring Josey Scott	4	22 June 2002	1
22 June 2002	9	"The Logical Song"	Scooter	2	6 July 2002	3
29 June 2002	2	"Stop Crying Your Heart Out"	Oasis	2	29 June 2002	1
29 June 2002	4	"When You Look at Me"	Christina Milian	3	29 June 2002	1
29 June 2002	7	"Hot in Herre"	Nelly	4	29 June 2002	1
29 June 2002	1	"Roll On"/"This Is How We Do It"	Mis-Teeq	7	29 June 2002	1
6 July 2002	3	"Wherever You Will Go"	The Calling	3	6 July 2002	1
6 July 2002	1	"Tell It to My Heart"	Kelly Llorenna	9	6 July 2002	1
13 July 2002	2	"By the Way"	Red Hot Chili Peppers	2	13 July 2002	1
13 July 2002	3	"I'm Gonna Be Alright"	Jennifer Lopez	3	13 July 2002	1
13 July 2002	1	"Baby's Got a Temper"	The Prodigy	5	13 July 2002	1
20 July 2002	6	"Anyone of Us (Stupid Mistake)" (#6)	Gareth Gates	1	20 July 2002	3
20 July 2002	3	"Foolish"	Ashanti	4	20 July 2002	1
20 July 2002	2	"Here I Am"	Bryan Adams	5	20 July 2002	1
27 July 2002	2	"Shooting Star"	Flip & Fill	3	27 July 2002	1
27 July 2002	1	"Your Song" ^{[E]}	Elton John & Alessandro Safina	4	27 July 2002	1
27 July 2002	1	"Work It Out"	Beyoncé	7	27 July 2002	1
3 August 2002	3	"Automatic High"	S Club Juniors	2	3 August 2002	1
3 August 2002	3	"Underneath Your Clothes"	Shakira	3	3 August 2002	1
3 August 2002	1	"Livin' It Up"	Ja Rule featuring Case	5	3 August 2002	1
3 August 2002	2	"A Thousand Miles"	Vanessa Carlton	6	3 August 2002	1
3 August 2002	1	"High Voltage"/"Points of Authority"	Linkin Park	9	3 August 2002	1
10 August 2002	6	"Colourblind"	Darius	1	10 August 2002	2
10 August 2002	3	"Black Suits Comin' (Nod Ya Head)"	Will Smith featuring Tra-Knox	3	10 August 2002	1
10 August 2002	2	"I Need a Girl (Part One)"/"U Don't Have to Call" ^{[F]}	P. Diddy featuring Usher & Loon	4	10 August 2002	1
10 August 2002	1	"Boys (The Co-Ed Remix)"	Britney Spears featuring Pharrell Williams	7	10 August 2002	1
17 August 2002	1	"In My Place"	Coldplay	2	17 August 2002	1
17 August 2002	4	"Like a Prayer"	Mad'House	3	17 August 2002	1
17 August 2002	1	"Girl All the Bad Guys Want"	Bowling for Soup	8	17 August 2002	1
24 August 2002	5	"Round Round"	Sugababes	1	24 August 2002	1
24 August 2002	2	"Romeo Dunn"	Romeo	3	24 August 2002	1
24 August 2002	2	"James Dean (I Wanna Know)"	Daniel Bedingfield	4	24 August 2002	1
24 August 2002	1	"Lovin' Is Easy"	Hear'Say	6	24 August 2002	1
24 August 2002	1	"Alone"	Lasgo	7	24 August 2002	1
24 August 2002	1	"Half a Heart"	H & Claire	8	24 August 2002	1
31 August 2002	3	"Crossroads"	Blazin' Squad	1	31 August 2002	1
31 August 2002	4	"Addictive"	Truth Hurts featuring Rakim	3	31 August 2002	1
31 August 2002	3	"What You Got"	Abs	4	31 August 2002	1
31 August 2002	2	"Starry Eyed Surprise"	Oakenfold	6	31 August 2002	1
31 August 2002	1	"Just the Way You Are"	Milky	8	31 August 2002	1
7 September 2002	6	"The Tide Is High (Get the Feeling)"	Atomic Kitten	1	7 September 2002	3
7 September 2002	2	"Dy-Na-Mi-Tee"	Ms. Dynamite	5	7 September 2002	1
7 September 2002	1	"Too Bad"	Nickelback	9	7 September 2002	1
14 September 2002	2	"Fantasy"	Appleton	2	14 September 2002	1
14 September 2002	1	"Forever"	N-Trance	6	14 September 2002	1
14 September 2002	1	"It's Written in the Stars"	Paul Weller	7	14 September 2002	1
21 September 2002	2	"Got to Have Your Love"	Liberty X	2	21 September 2002	1
21 September 2002	1	"Papa Don't Preach"	Kelly Osbourne	3	21 September 2002	1
21 September 2002	3	"Nessaja"	Scooter	4	21 September 2002	1
21 September 2002	1	"I Love It When We Do"	Ronan Keating	5	21 September 2002	1
21 September 2002	1	"When I Lost You"	Sarah Whatmore	6	21 September 2002	1
21 September 2002	1	"Walk On Water"	Milk Inc.	10	21 September 2002	1
28 September 2002	5	"Just Like a Pill"	Pink	1	28 September 2002	1
28 September 2002	3	"What I Go to School For"	Busted	3	28 September 2002	1
28 September 2002	2	"Cleanin' Out My Closet"	Eminem	4	28 September 2002	1
28 September 2002	1	"Everyday"	Bon Jovi	5	28 September 2002	1
28 September 2002	2	"Strange and Beautiful (I'll Put a Spell on You)"	Aqualung	7	28 September 2002	1
28 September 2002	1	"Feel It Boy"	Beenie Man featuring Janet Jackson	9	28 September 2002	1
28 September 2002	1	"Dem Girlz (I Don't Know Why)"	Oxide & Neutrino featuring Kowdean	10	28 September 2002	1
5 October 2002	4	"The Long and Winding Road"/"Suspicious Minds" ^{[G]}	Will Young & Gareth Gates	1	5 October 2002	2
5 October 2002	3	"Little by Little"/"She Is Love"	Oasis	2	5 October 2002	1
5 October 2002	5	"Complicated"	Avril Lavigne	3	5 October 2002	2
5 October 2002	1	"Gangsta Lovin'"	Eve featuring Alicia Keys	6	5 October 2002	1
12 October 2002	2	"Down Boy"	Holly Valance	2	12 October 2002	1
12 October 2002	2	"Down 4 U"	Irv Gotti presents The Inc. featuring Ja Rule, Ashanti, Charli Baltimore & Vita	4	12 October 2002	1
12 October 2002	2	"My Vision"	Jakatta featuring Seal	6	12 October 2002	1
12 October 2002	1	"Bunsen Burner"	John Otway	9	12 October 2002	1
19 October 2002	13	"The Ketchup Song (Aserejé)" (#8)	Las Ketchup	1	19 October 2002	1
19 October 2002	3	"New Direction"	S Club Juniors	2	19 October 2002	1
19 October 2002	1	"All My Life"	Foo Fighters	5	19 October 2002	1
26 October 2002	9	"Dilemma" (#4)	Nelly featuring Kelly Rowland	1	26 October 2002	2
26 October 2002	4	"Nu Flow"	Big Brovaz	3	26 October 2002	1
26 October 2002	2	"I'm Right Here"	Samantha Mumba	5	26 October 2002	1
26 October 2002	1	"There by the Grace of God"	Manic Street Preachers	6	26 October 2002	1
26 October 2002	1	"Luv U Better"	LL Cool J	7	26 October 2002	1
26 October 2002	1	"You Were Right"	Badly Drawn Boy	9	26 October 2002	1
2 November 2002	3	"Like I Love You"	Justin Timberlake	2	2 November 2002	1
2 November 2002	2	"One Love"	Blue	3	2 November 2002	1
2 November 2002	1	"Electrical Storm"	U2	5	2 November 2002	1
9 November 2002	4	"Heaven"	DJ Sammy & Yanou featuring Do	1	9 November 2002	1
9 November 2002	1	"Die Another Day"	Madonna	3	9 November 2002	1
9 November 2002	1	"What's Your Flava?"	Craig David	8	9 November 2002	1
9 November 2002	1	"It's All Gravy"	Romeo featuring Christina Milian	9	9 November 2002	1
9 November 2002	1	"Hey Sexy Lady"	Shaggy	10	9 November 2002	1
16 November 2002	3	"Unbreakable"	Westlife	1	16 November 2002	1
16 November 2002	2	"I'm Gonna Getcha Good!"	Shania Twain	4	16 November 2002	1
16 November 2002	1	"Work It"	Missy Elliott	6	16 November 2002	1
16 November 2002	1	"Put the Needle on It"	Dannii Minogue	7	16 November 2002	1
16 November 2002	1	"All Out of Love"	H & Claire	10	16 November 2002	1
23 November 2002	5	"Dirrty"	Christina Aguilera featuring Redman	1	23 November 2002	2
23 November 2002	1	"Love on the Line"	Blazin' Squad	6	23 November 2002	1
23 November 2002	2	"Stronger"/"Angels with Dirty Faces"	Sugababes	7	23 November 2002	1
23 November 2002	1	"Come into My World"	Kylie Minogue	8	23 November 2002	1
23 November 2002	1	"The Scientist"	Coldplay	10	23 November 2002	1
30 November 2002	2	"Don't Let Me Down"/"You and I" ^{[H]}	Will Young	2	30 November 2002	1
30 November 2002	2	"Jenny from the Block"	Jennifer Lopez	3	30 November 2002	1
30 November 2002	1	"Alive"	S Club	5	30 November 2002	1
30 November 2002	1	"Through the Rain"	Mariah Carey	8	30 November 2002	1
7 December 2002	10	"If You're Not the One"	Daniel Bedingfield	1	7 December 2002	1
7 December 2002	2	"The Last Goodbye"/"Be with You"	Atomic Kitten	2	7 December 2002	1
7 December 2002	3	"We've Got Tonight"	Ronan Keating featuring Lulu	4	7 December 2002	1
7 December 2002	1	"Rushes"	Darius	5	7 December 2002	1
7 December 2002	1	"United States of Whatever"	Liam Lynch	10	7 December 2002	1
14 December 2002	13	"Lose Yourself"	Eminem	1	14 December 2002	1
14 December 2002	6	"Cheeky Song (Touch My Bum)"	The Cheeky Girls	2	14 December 2002	4
14 December 2002	4	"Feel"	Robbie Williams	4	14 December 2002	1
14 December 2002	1	"Holding On for You"	Liberty X	5	14 December 2002	1
21 December 2002	5	"Sorry Seems to be the Hardest Word"	Blue featuring Elton John	1	21 December 2002	1
21 December 2002	1	"What My Heart Wants to Say"	Gareth Gates	5	21 December 2002	1
21 December 2002	1	"Puppy Love"/"Sleigh Ride"	S Club Juniors	6	21 December 2002	1
28 December 2002	7	"Sound of the Underground"	Girls Aloud	1	28 December 2002	4
28 December 2002	4	"Sacred Trust"/"After You're Gone"	One True Voice	2	28 December 2002	1
28 December 2002	4	"You're a Superstar"	Love Inc.	7	28 December 2002	4
28 December 2002	3	"Sk8er Boi" ♦	Avril Lavigne	8	11 January 2003	1

== Entries by artist ==
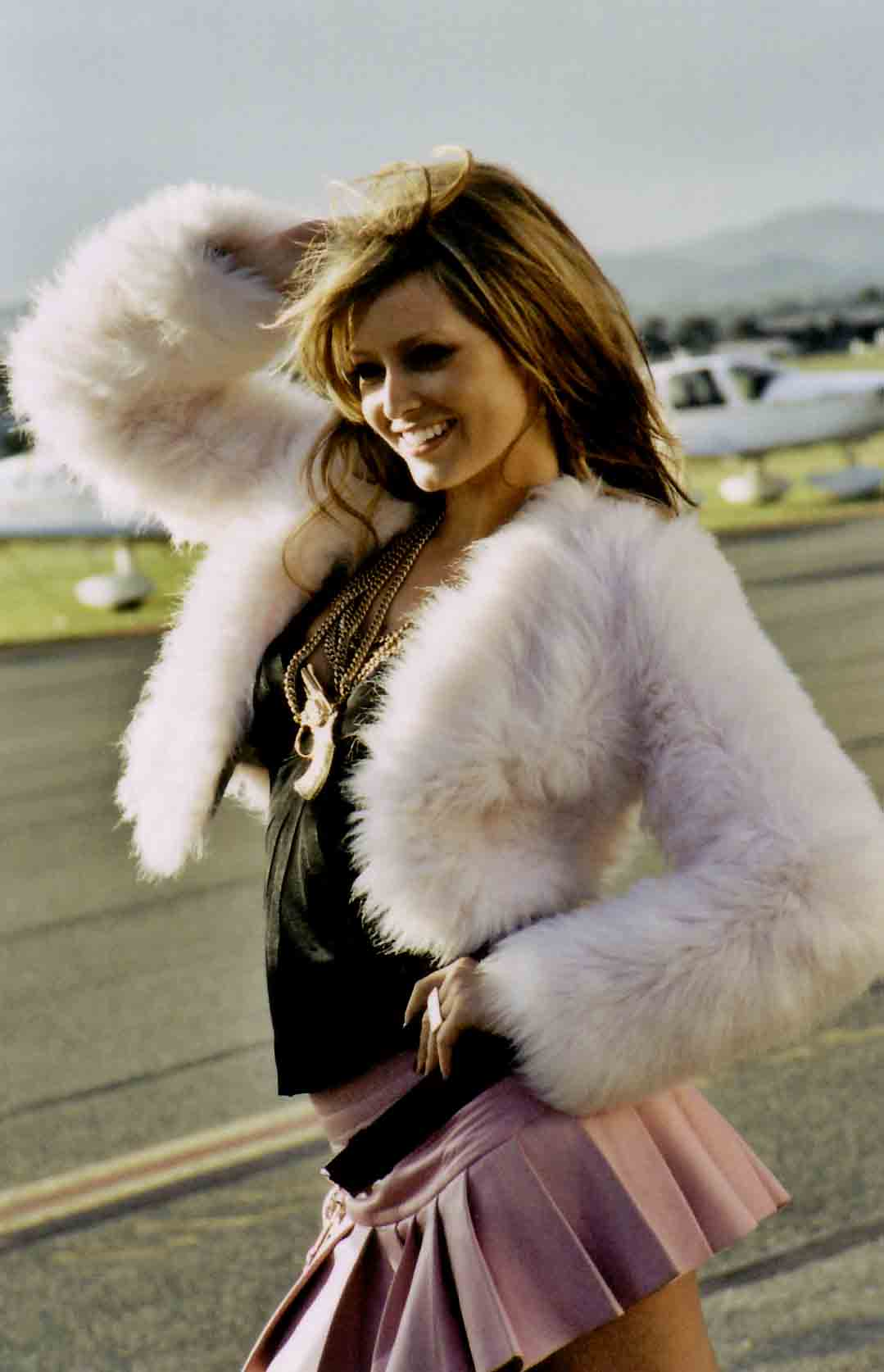
Australian actress and singer Holly Valance had two UK top 10 hits in 2002. "Kiss Kiss" went to number-one in May while "Down Boy" reached number two in October.

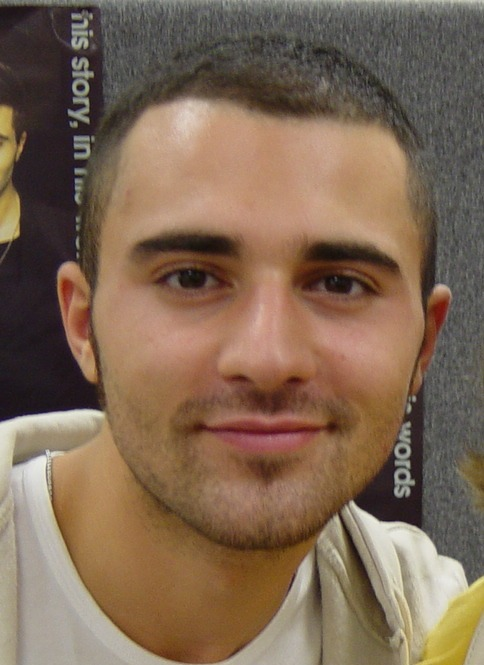
Scottish singer Darius Campbell, who came third in Pop Idol, scored two top 10 entries this year, including his debut single "Colourblind", which topped the chart for two weeks in August.

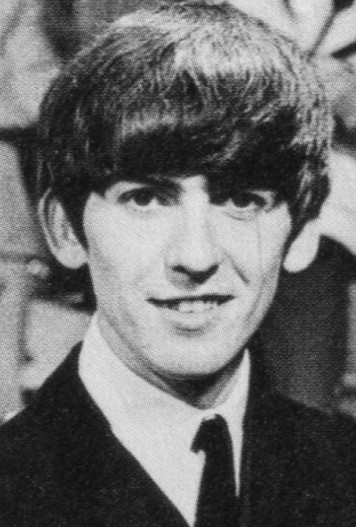
In January 2002, less than two months after his death from lung cancer, ex-Beatle George Harrison posthumously reached number-one in the UK charts with a re-release of his 1971 chart-topper "My Sweet Lord".

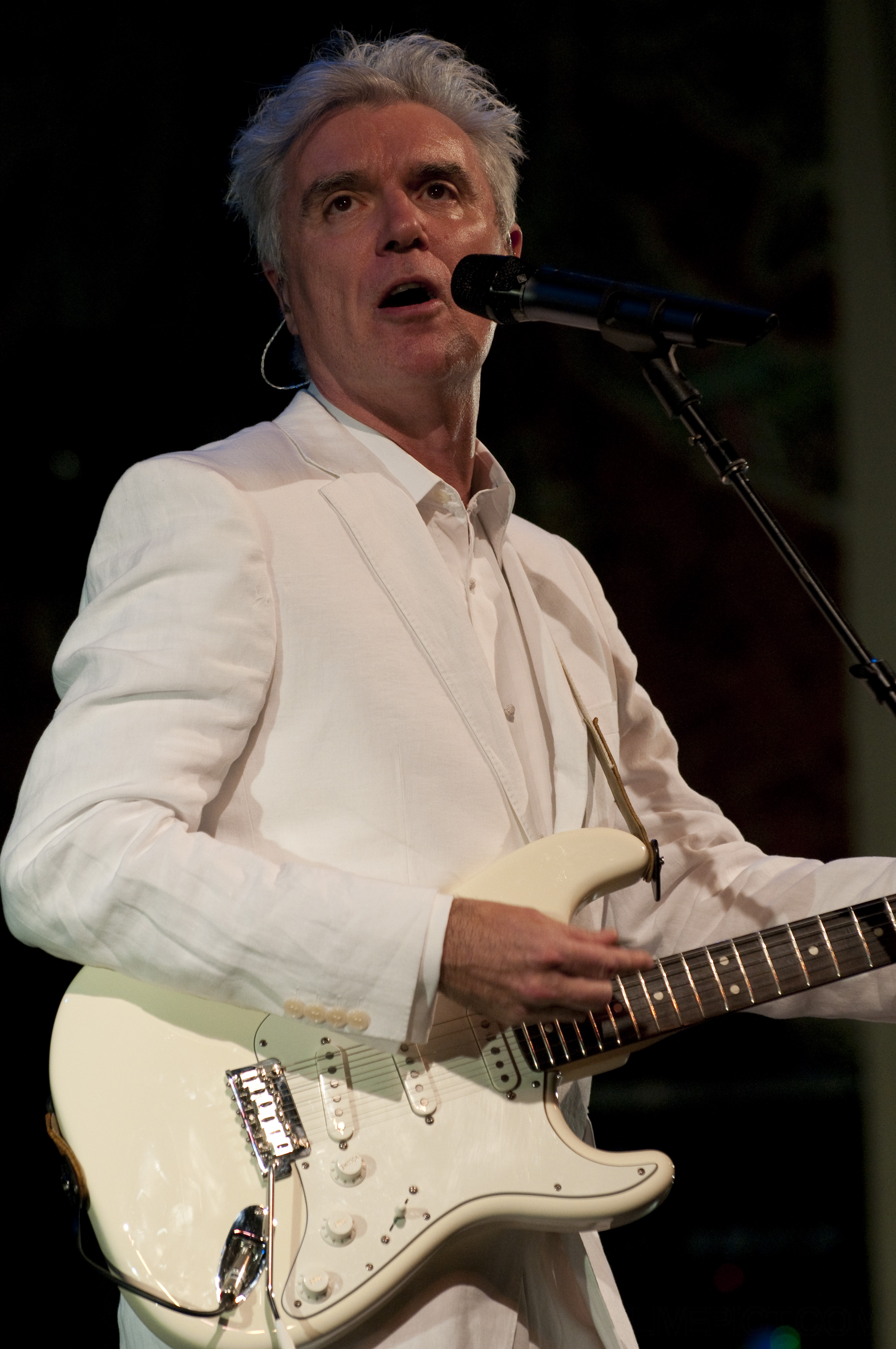
David Byrne, the lead singer of rock band Talking Heads, featured on X-Press 2's hit single "Lazy", which reached number two in April of this year.

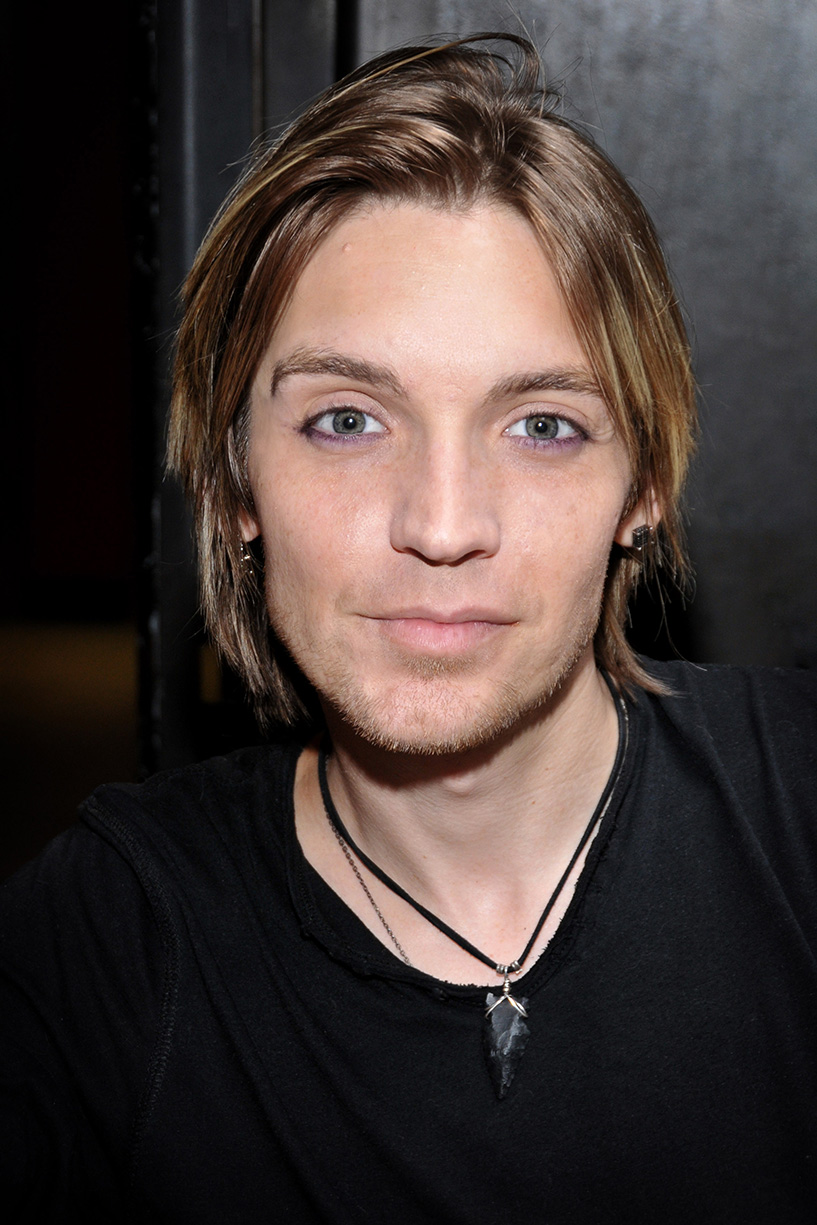
Alex Band and his group The Calling made the UK top 10 in 2002 with their signature song, "Wherever You Will Go", which peaked at number three.

The following table shows artists who achieved two or more top 10 entries in 2002, including singles that reached their peak in 2001 or 2003. The figures include both main artists and featured artists, while appearances on ensemble charity records are also counted for each artist. The total number of weeks an artist spent in the top ten in 2002 is also shown.

Entries	Artist	Weeks	Singles
4	Ashanti ^{[I]}	12	"Always on Time", "Down 4 U", "Foolish", "What's Luv?"
4	Gareth Gates	17	"Anyone of Us (Stupid Mistake)", "The Long and Winding Road"/"Suspicious Minds", "Unchained Melody", "What My Heart Wants to Say"
4	S Club Juniors	11	"Automatic High", "New Direction", "One Step Closer", "Puppy Love"/"Sleigh Ride"
4	Will Young	15	"Anything Is Possible"/"Evergreen", "Don't Let Me Down"/"You and I", "Light My Fire" "The Long and Winding Road"
3	Atomic Kitten	11	"It's OK!", "The Last Goodbye"/"Be with You", "The Tide is High (Get the Feeling)"
3	Blue	10	"Fly By II", "One Love", "Sorry Seems to Be the Hardest Word"
3	Britney Spears	7	"Boys", "I'm Not a Girl, Not Yet a Woman", "Overprotected"
3	Chad Kroeger ^{[J]}	16	"Hero", "How You Remind Me", "Too Bad"
3	Christina Milian ^{[K]}	8	"AM to PM", "It's All Gravy", "When You Look at Me"
3	Daniel Bedingfield ^{[L]}	20	"Gotta Get thru This", "If You're Not the One", "James Dean (I Wanna Know)"
3	Eminem	22	"Cleanin' Out My Closet", "Lose Yourself", "Without Me"
3	Eve ^{[M]}	7	"4 My People", "Caramel", "Gangsta Lovin'"
3	H & Claire	3	"All Out of Love", "DJ", "Half a Heart"
3	Ja Rule ^{[N]}	7	"Always on Time", "Down 4 U", "Livin' It Up"
3	Jennifer Lopez	6	"Ain't It Funny (Murder Remix)", "I'm Gonna Be Alright", "Jenny from the Block"
3	Kylie Minogue	5	"Come into My World", "In Your Eyes", "Love at First Sight"
3	Liberty X	10	"Got to Have Your Love", "Holding On for You", "Just a Little"
3	Nelly	19	"Dilemma", "Girlfriend", "Hot in Herre"
3	Oasis	7	"The Hindu Times", "Little by Little", "Stop Crying Your Heart Out"
3	Pink	12	"Don't Let Me Get Me", "Get the Party Started", "Just Like a Pill"
3	Romeo ^{[O]}	4	"Haters", "It's All Gravy", "Romeo Dunn"
3	Ronan Keating	10	"If Tomorrow Never Comes", "I Love It When We Do", "We've Got Tonight"
3	S Club ^{[L]}^{[P]}	11	"Alive", "Have You Ever", "You"
3	Sugababes	11	"Freak Like Me", "Round Round", "Stronger"/"Angels with Dirty Faces"
3	Westlife	7	"Bop Bop Baby", "Unbreakable", "World of Our Own"
2	Avril Lavigne ^{[Q]}	6	"Complicated", "Sk8er Boi"
2	Blazin' Squad	4	"Crossroads", "Love on the Line"
2	Coldplay	2	"In My Place", "The Scientist"
2	Darius	7	"Colourblind", "Rushes"
2	Elton John ^{[R]}	3	"Sorry Seems to Be the Hardest Word", "Your Song"
2	Enrique Iglesias	11	"Escape", "Hero"
2	Flip & Fill	5	"Shooting Star", "True Love Never Dies"
2	Holly Valance	8	"Down Boy", "Kiss Kiss"
2	Ian Van Dahl ^{[L]}	3	"Reason", "Will I?"
2	Jakatta	3	"My Vision", "So Lonely"
2	Justin Timberlake	7	"Girlfriend", "Like I Love You"
2	Kelly Llorenna ^{[S]}	4	"Tell It to My Heart", "True Love Never Dies"
2	Lasgo	6	"Alone", "Something"
2	Milk Inc.	5	"In My Eyes", "Walk On Water"
2	Mis-Teeq	2	"B with Me", "Roll On"/"This Is How We Do It"
2	Missy Elliott	6	"4 My People", "Work It"
2	Ms. Dynamite	3	"Dy-Na-Mi-Tee", "It Takes More"
2	Nickelback	12	"How You Remind Me", "Too Bad"
2	Robbie Williams ^{[L]}	5	"Feel", "Somethin' Stupid"
2	Samantha Mumba ^{[L]}	4	"I'm Right Here", "Lately"
2	Scooter	12	"Nessaja", "The Logical Song"
2	Shaggy	7	"Hey Sexy Lady", "Me Julie"
2	Shakira	13	"Underneath Your Clothes", "Whenever, Wherever"
2	Sophie Ellis-Bextor ^{[L]}	4	"Murder on the Dancefloor", "Get Over You"/"Move This Mountain"

== Notes ==
- ^{a} "Sk8er Boi" reached its peak of number eight on 11 January 2003 (week ending).
- ^{b} Released as the official single for Children in Need in 2001.
- ^{c} "My Sweet Lord" originally peaked at number-one upon its initial release in 1971. It was re-released as a single in January 2002, less than two months after George Harrison's death from lung cancer and reached number-one again for a single week.
- ^{d} The original version of "Run to the Hills" peaked at number 7 upon its release in 1982.
- ^{e} Released as the official single for Sport Relief.
- ^{f} P Diddy, Usher and Loon all sang on "I Need a Girl (Part One)" but only Usher recorded the second song on the double-A side single, "U Don't Have to Call".
- ^{g} Gareth Gates and Will Young both sang on "The Long and Winding Road" but only Gates recorded the second song on the double-A side single, "Suspicious Minds".
- ^{h} Released as the official single for Children in Need.
- ^{i} Figure includes appearances on Ja Rule's "Always on Time", Fat Joe's "What's Luv?" and Irv Gotti presents The Inc.'s "Down 4 U".
- ^{j} Figure includes solo work and recordings with the group Nickelback.
- ^{k} Figure includes appearance on MC Romeo's "It's All Gravy".
- ^{l} Figure includes single that peaked in 2001.
- ^{m} Figure includes appearances on City High's "Caramel" and Missy Elliot's "4 My People".
- ^{n} Figure includes appearance on Irv Gotti presents The Inc.'s "Down 4 U".
- ^{o} Figure includes a top 10 hit with the group So Solid Crew.
- ^{p} S Club 7 changed their name to S Club after Paul Cattermole left the group in March 2002.
- ^{q} Figure includes single that peaked in 2003.
- ^{r} Figure includes appearance on Blue's "Sorry Seems to Be the Hardest Word".
- ^{s} Figure includes appearance on Flip & Fill's "True Love Never Dies".

== See also ==
- 2002 in British music
- List of number-one singles from the 2000s (UK)
