= Italian popular music =

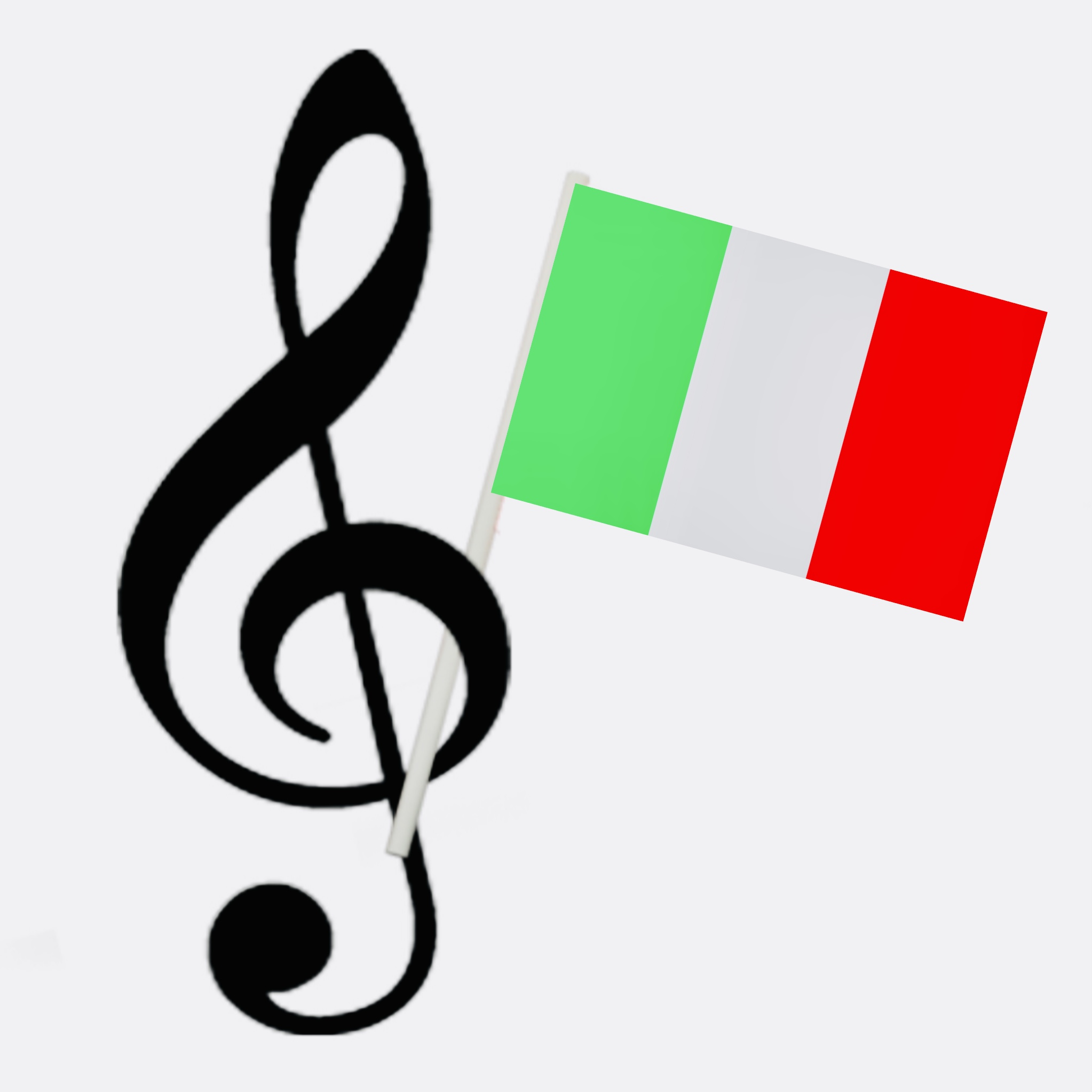
- Italian music icon
- Native name: Musica popolare italiana
- Stylistic origins: rock and roll; R&B; Italo disco; electronic; Techno; etc.
- Cultural origins: Italy

Italian popular music is musical output which is not usually considered academic or classical music but rather has its roots in the popular traditions.

== The Fascist period: affirmation of a national Italian culture ==
Music and the artistic production of this period reflected the need of the political class to affirm its ideological statement of a united and strong Italian identity on both the political as well as cultural basis.

Regional languages and independent cultural inheritances began to be slowly eradicated through the school system and the advent of the mass media which, at the time, were entirely controlled by the Italian government. The slow process of the industrialization which begun during the fascist period had strong effects on the lower classes; it helped in forming the contemporary Italian society, in particular in the economical separation between the north and the south, which is reflected in the different references to the traditional background in the contemporary popular music. Emigration contributed to the exportation of the Italian musical background to other countries such as Argentina, Australia, and the United States.

== 1948 to the late 1980s: slow evolution to new forms ==
During the second half of the twentieth century, Italian popular music has seen a strong shift as a result of the influences foreign music had on the Italian musicians brought by the technological advances such as television, tapes vinyl. In particular, the protests of 1968 helped to form a new group of musicians in contrast with the stereotypes of the musica leggera (light music) and opened to new musical forms.

- Foundation of musica leggera during the fifties and early sixties, e.g. Domenico Modugno, Adriano Celentano, Mina, Mia Martini, Gino Paoli, Sanremo Festival
- Music of the '68 and the Modern Italian troubadours e.g. Fabrizio De André, Francesco Guccini, Francesco De Gregori, Giorgio Gaber
- Opposition with the traditional musica leggera, e.g. Celentano, Mina, Toto Cutugno, Gianni Morandi
- New direction of the late 1970s, e.g. progressive rock, Franco Battiato, Le Orme, Lucio Dalla
- Rock leggero of the 1980s and 1990s, e.g. Vasco Rossi, Piero Pelù

== Contemporary music ==
=== Rock and pop ===
Italian pop and rock has produced many stars including: Laura Pausini, Eros Ramazzotti, Mango, Max Pezzali, Biagio Antonacci, Antonello Venditti, Lucio Dalla, Lara Fabian, Tiziano Ferro, Anna Tatangelo, partially Salvatore Adamo and Pooh, Adriano Celentano, Mina, Andrea Bocelli and Elisa. Additionally, a popular singer is Viola Valentino. The modern style of pop music tends toward sentimental ballads with a crooning vocal style, although it previously had a blend of Mediterranean folk rhythms fused with pop forms. These folkier pop artists included Lucio Battisti, Vasco Rossi and Pino Daniele. Modern and young emerging artists falling within this genre who have acquired public success for their voices include Alessandra Amoroso, Malika Ayane, Emma, Arisa and Noemi to name a few.

During the 1960s and 1970s, Italian popular music changed by incorporating Latin American and Anglo musical traditions, especially Brazilian bossa nova, American and British rock and roll and even jazz. The same period saw diversification in the cinema of Italy, and Cinecittà films included complex scores by composers including Ennio Morricone, Armando Trovaioli, Piero Piccioni and Piero Umiliani. This film music remained popular in the 1970s, and then underwent a revival in the 1990s.

Italy was one of the leading nations of the progressive rock movement of the 1970s (the others being Germany and the United Kingdom), and its progressive scene was big, united and lively. The main Italian style of progressive rock was symphonic rock mixed with Italian folk music influences, e.g. Banco del Mutuo Soccorso, Le Orme, Premiata Forneria Marconi, Pooh, Il Balletto di Bronzo. There were also some experimental rock bands around, such as Area. Progressive rock concerts were usually political events with an energetic atmosphere: Area's songs had mainly left-wing political lyrics.

Beginning in the 1980s, pop grew more heterogeneous and more in line with international sounds. Italian house music spawned Black Box, whose first single "Ride on Time" was an international hit, making the Top 10 in many countries and no 1 in the UK, becoming the UK's best-selling single of 1989. Zucchero is a leading Italian rock musician along with Luciano Ligabue and Vasco Rossi, whilst Jovanotti is a widely popular singer mixing elements of dance music with Italian popular music and rap. Other prominent rock bands include Litfiba.

In the 2000s, dance music group DB Boulevard with vocalist Moony, charted at number 3 on the UK Singles Chart in 2001, with their song "Point of View". The video accompanying the song featured a computer-animated cardboard woman driving a cardboard car through a cardboard city. The song earned DB Boulevard the distinction of being the first Italian music group to be nominated at the MTV Europe Music Awards.

=== Electronic and dance music ===
Techno, trance, and electronica are all popular forms of electronic dance music in Italy. The country is home to genres such as Italodance, Italo house and Italo disco, and the Swiss-born but Italy-raised Robert Miles was one of the seminal artists of the dream trance genre.

- Baltimora
- Barrio Jazz Gang
- Benny Benassi
- Black Box
- East Side Beat
- Eiffel 65
- Gabry Ponte
- Gigi D'Agostino
- Giorgio Moroder
- Kano
- Koto
- Livin' Joy
- Montefiori Cocktail
- Nicola Conte
- Raf
- Scotch

=== Hip hop ===
The Italian hip hop scene began in the early 1990s with Articolo 31 from Milan. Their style was mainly influenced by the East Coast rap. Other early rap groups are typically politically oriented acts, such as 99 Posse (who later became influenced by British trip hop). More recent artists of the genre include Fabri Fibra and Club Dogo.

== Return to tradition: patchanka ==
Following De André, many artists are rediscovering the forms of traditional music abandoned since the fascist period as a sort of traditional revival, including Tazenda and Teresa De Sio. There are bands in Italy that play patchanka music, characterized by a mixture of traditional music, punk, reggae, rock, and political lyrics. Modena City Ramblers are one of the more popular bands; they mix Irish, Italian, punk, reggae and many other forms of music. Other bands include Casa del Vento, Mau Mau, Banda Bassotti and Talco.

== Jazz ==
The most important jazz scenes are in Rome and Milan, however many Italian jazz musicians are resident in Paris. Italian instrumentalists include: saxophonists Stefano di Battista and Francesco Cafiso, pianists Danilo Rea and Stefano Bollani, trumpet players Paolo Fresu and Enrico Rava. Palermo also has a lively jazz scene, including Enzo Rao, who have added native Sicilian influences to American jazz.

== Sources ==
- Marcello Sorce Keller, "American Influences in Italian Popular Music between the Two World Wars", Orbis Musicae, no. 11, 1993–94, pp. 124– 136.
- Marcello Sorce Keller, "Popular Music in the Mediterranean: Some Remarks Concerning Forms of Culture Contact", Revista de Musicologia, XVI(1993), no. 4, pp. 1– 7.
