= I'll Be Loving You =

I'll Be Loving You or I'll Be Lovin' U may refer to:

- "I'll Be Loving You (Forever)", a 1989 single by New Kids on the Block, from the album Hangin' Tough
- "I'll Be Lovin' U Long Time", a 2008 single by Mariah Carey, from the album E=MC²
- "Dove (I'll Be Loving You)", a 2002 single by Moony, from the album Lifestories
- "I'll Be Loving You", 1993 single by Collage
