= 2002 in British music charts =

This is a summary of 2002 in music in the United Kingdom, including the official charts from that year. In 2002, as in the previous year, there were 30 songs that reached the top of the charts. Although there were numerous songs that remained at the top for only a week, several managed to carry out runs of two or more weeks, none achieving above four.

The UK also celebrated the 50th anniversary of the UK singles chart. After the Popstars phenomenon of the previous year, the UK became obsessed with talent show winners and the new show Pop Idol became a huge success. The year was thought of as the 2nd Golden Age of Hip-Hop music with many successful artists with Eminem coming out at top once again.

== Summary ==
=== Charts ===
==== January ====
The first week of the month was the last week at the top for 2001's Christmas chart topper, a modern rendition of "Somethin' Stupid", a duet by Robbie Williams and actress Nicole Kidman. Returning to the top for one final week was Daniel Bedingfield's debut single, "Gotta Get Thru This". It broke the record for lowest weekly sale for a number one single, selling only 25,500 copies in that week. The single was to decline slightly during 2002, but rapidly after the year's end. The remainder of the month was to be incredibly morbid. Dying in a plane crash in the summer of 2001 at the young age of 22, R'n'B vocalist, Aaliyah hit the top with her posthumous release, "More Than a Woman". She had broken a record in the US, becoming the first artist to make No.1 on the Billboard Hot 100 based solely upon airplay points, with her single "Try Again". Overtaking her was what made this month significant. The youngest Beatle, George Harrison, died in November 2001 after a long struggle with cancer. His No. 1 from 1971, "My Sweet Lord" was re-issued and shot straight to the top of the charts. Though it only remained there a week, it entered the record books, being the first time in UK chart history a posthumous release has taken over from another posthumous release by another artist.

Returning to number one after April in 2001, the Stereophonics returned to the top with their third album, Just Enough Education to Perform. Spawning two No. 5 singles, the album remained at the top for 3 weeks in this return, one more week than its original stay. This made its total number of weeks at the top 5. This became their 2nd UK album chart topper, and a 3rd was to follow the following year.

==== February ====
Spanish performer Enrique Iglesias was next to hit the top with what many see as his UK Breakthrough (though he had two top tens two years prior) with the single release of the ballad "Hero" which stayed at the top for four weeks. He made himself and his father Julio Iglesias the first father/son combination to top the charts separately and as solo artists. His father had hit the top of the UK charts over 20 years prior with his cover version of "Begin The Beguine". "Hero" was taken from his chart topping album Escape which made him the first act to top the single and album charts simultaneously in five years and spawned a No. 3 hit "Escape" and two No. 12 hits by December.

Taking over from the Stereophonics were fusion kings, the Chemical Brothers, with their 3rd No. 1 album, Come With Us. Despite having received success on the albums chart throughout their career, they hadn't received a chart topping single since early 1997. Topping the charts alongside his only number one single, Enrique's second English album, Escape topped the charts for 2 weeks making him the first Latin Artist to have a number one single and album simultaneously in the UK as well as the first person since the Spice Girls.

==== March ====
Overtaking the totals of pop phenomena Spice Girls and ABBA, Westlife hit the top for a record 10th time, with their third release from their third album, "World Of Our Own". The album of the same name, became their second consecutive No. 1 album. They now had as many number ones as the queen of pop herself, Madonna. They also were the act to obtain 10 chart toppers the quickest (now 5 acts had achieved 10 or more) with only 35 months between this and their first. However, it could be said this record is unfair, because it was only a few months after that the Beatles managed to achieve 10, but they tended to spend several weeks at the summit, slowing down their release rate, whereas most of Westlife's #1's spent one to two weeks at the top.

Taking over was the fastest selling debut single in UK chart history. Winner of the TV talent show, Pop Idol, Will Young had been voted as the winner by over 4 million people in the final. Despite the media suggesting this was unexpected, Young actually won six out of the nine weeks with Gareth Gates the eventually runner-up winning three times. His debut single "Anything is Possible/Evergreen", topped the charts for 3 weeks and sold over 1.1 million copies in its first week of sale, making it the fastest selling debut single in UK chart history. Altogether it sold over 1.7 million copies becoming the 11th biggest selling single in the UK. It is also the second fastest selling single in the UK with only Elton John's "Candle in the Wind" ahead of it. It became the biggest selling single of the year.

A 2-week run at the top was next from veteran band The Police. Experiencing massive success in the early 1980s with 5 No. 1 singles, lead singer Sting eventually went solo and became a very successful and highly respected musician, especially in the US. A combination of his greatest hits and the Police's greatest hits was released entitled The Very Best of Sting & The Police. Greatest hits took over from greatest hits when The Essential Barbra Streisand replaced Sting & The Police at the top, however after a week it was knocked off by rock band, Nickelback with their 3rd studio album, Silver Side Up. The album spawned a massive No. 4 hit, "How You Remind Me", which made No. 1 in the US.

==== April ====
Taking over from the winner of the show, Pop Idol, runner up Gareth Gates scored a No. 1 with his debut single, "Unchained Melody". Incredibly he spent one further week at the summit than Will Young did, becoming the second single of the year to have a four-week run at #1. However, the single itself sold less than Will Young's, selling only 1.3 million copies, but nonetheless it became the 77th million selling single in the UK and the last one until 2004. Overall, it is the 37th biggest selling single in the UK. The more incredible thing about this song is that it is the fourth single to reach the summit 4 times by different artists. First was Jimmy Young in 1955, then a re-issue of The Righteous Brothers in 1990, then the acting duo Robson & Jerome took it the top in 1995 and finally Gareth Gates in 2002. Robson & Jerome's version remains the biggest selling to date.

Scoring their sixth UK chart topper Oasis returned to the top of the UK charts with a track similar to their older material, "The Hindu Times". The track was taken off their new album, Heathen Chemistry. It only lasted a week at the summit, following the same fate as every other No. 1 single they had.

The top of the albums chart was dominated by a lady with a powerful voice and her 5th UK No. 1 album, Céline Dion with A New Day Has Come. Staying at the top for 4 weeks, she did not hit the top again for the next two years, but continued charting throughout. The album's singles did not fare as well as the album, one making the Top 10, one settling in the Top 20 and one just creeping into the Top 40.

==== May ====
Having charted since 2000, UK girl group Sugababes (who were now under their second line-up of original members Keisha Buchanan, Mutya Buena and former Atomic Kitten member Heidi Range, who replaced Siobhán Donaghy after her departure the previous year) scored their first UK number one with their 5th single, "Freak like Me". The song was originally performed by Adina Howard in 1995 who took it to No. 33 – the group's version took the lyrics and placed them over an interpolated sample of Gary Numan and Tubeway Army's Are 'Friends' Electric?, itself a UK number one from 1979. After a short spell of 7 days, a third Neighbours star scored a UK No.1. Holly Valance's debut single, "Kiss Kiss" was originally released in Europe written in Turkish. Holly scored a No. 2 hit, "Down Boy" later on in the year and her debut album, Footprints made #9. After releasing 2 further singles, she disappeared from the music scene. With his fifth consecutive Top 10 single and 3rd UK No. 1, Ronan Keating returns to the top of the singles chart with the first release off his new album Destination. "If Tomorrow Never Comes" was originally a hit in the US for Garth Brooks.

Continuing the run of one week number ones were Liberty X. The five losers who just failed to make Hear'Say in the talent show Popstars formed Liberty X. Despite scoring only one UK No. 1 single with Just a Little, the group continued successfully into 2003/4 and proved themselves to be more successful than Hear'Say, who disbanded in October of this year. Also, after not releasing a single in the United Kingdom for almost 11 months, Atomic Kitten released their 9th single, titled It's Ok!, peaked at No. 3 on the charts, and eventually went silver. Even bigger success was to follow with their next release. Also scoring big success were S Club Juniors, an 8-piece pre-teen spin off from their already successful predecessors S Club 7 (who saw the departure of band member Paul Cattermole earlier that year). After being chosen from nationwide auditions to support S Club 7 on their arena tour, their debut single One Step Closer sent them straight to number 2, a position they also reached later in the year with their next two releases "Automatic High" in August and "New Direction" in October. Despite the split of the remaining six members of S Club 7 the following year, and a name change to S Club 8 they would go on to release two top 20 albums and score 7 top 20 singles before they disbanded in early 2005. Frankie Sandford and Rochelle Wiseman from the group, however, would re-emerge 5 years later in new girl group The Saturdays.

Nearly six months after its release, boyband Blue hit the top with their debut album, All Rise. The album had already spawned two number one singles by this point, "Too Close" and "If You Come Back" the previous year. The title track from their album, which was their debut single had also made No. 4 and a fourth single, "Fly by II" reached No. 6 in March of this year. It was only a week before British indie rock band, Doves hit the top with their 2nd album, The Last Broadcast which remained at the top for 2 weeks. It was quickly knocked off by American electronic musician Moby with his 2nd UK No. 1 album, 18. Despite having charted since 1991 he has only received 2 Top 10 hits.

On 23 May, the Classical Brits award ceremony took place. The most successful British performers were Sir Colin Davis, Russell Watson and Guy Johnston.

==== June ====
Consolidating his position as the rapper with the most UK chart toppers, Eminem hit the top for a third time with the first single from his third album, "Without Me". The album spent 5 weeks at the top of the UK charts, becoming the second longest stay of the year and the longest stay until December. The album, The Eminem Show was to become his most successful to date in the UK along with Curtain Call in 2005.

Will Young hit the top again with his second single "Light My Fire", a cover of a classic Doors track which only made No. 49 in 1967. He had performed this on the show, Pop Idol, and the performance was praised highly by the general public. The single was successful, topping the charts for 2 weeks.

As for the albums chart, first to hit the top was Ronan Keating with his second album, Destination. The album had already spawned a No. 1 single, "If Tomorrow Never Comes". Ronan continued to chart into 2004.

==== July ====
Becoming another single to spend 4 weeks at the top, "A Little Less Conversation" ended an ongoing chart battle since 1977. Elvis accumulated 15 chart toppers by 1965, during which the Beatles were enjoying their time as global megastars. They then got a record 17 chart toppers by 1969, when they finally began to fade. Elvis scored a 16th chart topper in 1970, when he revived his career in Las Vegas. Then a single made just before his death was released after his death in May 1977 and went straight to No.1, giving him his 17th UK #1. The two biggest music acts in the UK were neck and neck, and despite numerous posthumous releases, it wasn't until 25 years later that one of them finally took the lead. It was indeed the king of pop, Elvis Presley, who scored his 18th UK No. 1, with a remix of an old hit from a long forgotten movie. "A Little Less Conversation" was remixed by DJ JXL, and used in a Nike World Cup advertisement. As a consequence, it shot straight to the top of the UK charts putting Elvis at the top of the most #1's category.

Taking over was Gareth Gates, scoring his second No.1 single this time with an original song, being one of his few singles to have not been cover versions. "Anyone Of Us (Stupid Mistake)" topped the charts for 3 weeks, bettering Will Young by one week once again.

Topping the albums chart for the fourth time, Oasis hit the top with their new album, Heathen Chemistry. The album's singles had already received success with "The Hindu Times" becoming their 6th No. 1 and the follow-up single, "Stop Crying Your Heart Out" peaking at #2. The album, however, only spent a week at the top quickly overtaken by the first release in 2 years from the Red Hot Chili Peppers, By the Way. The title track from the album became their highest-charting single ever, making #2. This was also their only No. 1 album.

==== August ====
Hitting the top was Darius Danesh, third in Pop Idol. "Colourblind" spent two weeks at the top, but despite being less successful than the debuts of Gareth or Will, Darius wrote the song himself. The Sugababes hit the top for a second time with their sixth single, "Round Round". Like their first No. 1 single, it only spent a week at the summit. The song was taken from the soundtrack to the hit film, "The Guru". Specialising in Pop/R'N'B with garage influences, all-male act, Blazin' Squad entered at the top of the charts with their massively hyped debut single, "Crossroads". Their success slowly decline throughout their career.

Interrupting the Chili's run at the top was US singing legend, Bruce Springsteen hit the top with his 5th No. 1 album, The Rising. His success on the singles chart was fading rapidly since the early 1990s, with no Top 10 hits since 1994. Returning to the top for a further 2 weeks were the Chili's with By the Way. Having been a successful band throughout the 1980s the 1990s was a slightly quieter decade for the group, but the release of Californication turned them around in 2000 and By the Way helped propel them straight to the top. Scoring a 2nd consecutive UK No. 1 album, another collection of the late Eva Cassidy's work was compiled and released. Imagine was not quite as successful as Songbird, only topping the chart for a week, but put her on the way to breaking a chart record the following year.

==== September ====
Reviving an old number one for the second time to create another one for themselves were girl group Atomic Kitten. This time it was Blondie's 1980 chart topper "The Tide Is High", which they changed slightly to make "The Tide Is High (Get the Feeling)". It topped the charts for three weeks and after this they never saw the top of the charts again in the United Kingdom, however they had managed three number-one singles in the UK throughout their career. They split at the beginning of 2004, releasing a Greatest Hits album. US solo performer, Pink scored her first solo chart topper with a track taken from her second album, Missundaztood. The track was called "Just Like a Pill" and gave P!nk her second UK number one. Her album Missundaztood only peaked at number 2 despite producing several hit singles.

Increasing their popularity even further, Coldplay released their second album, and follow up to massive successful Parachutes. A Rush of Blood to the Head became a great success. Containing hits such as "In My Place", "The Scientist" & "Clocks", the album even sustained their popularity in the US and they became one of the few 21st century British acts to achieve fame and popularity in the US. While topping the singles charts with their third and final number one, Atomic Kitten scored a No. 1 album with their 3rd release, Feels So Good. The album spawned two top 3 hits as well as their 3rd chart topper.

==== October ====
After both having two chart toppers, the two "Pop Idols", Will Young and Gareth Gates joined forces and revived an old Beatles classic, "The Long and Winding Road". It gave them both their third UK chart topper and established both of them as national stars. However, it was from here that Gareth would slowly decline and Will would rise to become an even bigger star. The B-side to this was Gareth's re-working of Elvis' classic No. 2 from 1969, "Suspicious Minds". Will Young's version of Jackie Wilson's" Sweetest Feeling" also appeared on the B-side.

The year was proving to be very successful for Elvis in many ways and there was one great album success to still be received. Next to hit the top, but only for a week were three Spanish sisters, Las Ketchup with a holiday novelty song "The Ketchup Song (Asjere)". What was probably considered the tune of 2002 came next and was a duet between US rapper Nelly and Kelly Rowland, a member of Destiny's Child. She was the only one out of the three from her old group experiencing success as a solo artist, but she soon would be overtaken by Beyoncé Knowles. "Dilemma" became a song no-one would ever forget and stayed on top of the charts for 2 weeks. It also topped the charts in the US. Nelly experienced much greater success in his home country compared to the UK.

Gathering every No. 1 single Elvis had experienced in both the UK and US, a collection of 30 songs plus "A Little Less Conversation" as a bonus track was released on an album, entitled Elv1s – 30 Number 1 Hits. The king of pop clocked up more sales, staying on top for 2 weeks. He was replaced by Pop Idol Will Young, who scored his first No. 1 album, with 'From Now On'. The album contained his first 3 singles, all of which had topped the chart. The album stayed at the top of the charts for 2 weeks. The album spawned one final hit, which peaked at #2.

==== November ====
Based in Germany, Spanish producer, DJ Sammy, featuring Yanou and Do on vocals re-worked an old Bryan Adams track from 1985, "Heaven" and took it to the top. Bryan Adams only managed to take the track to #38. Only lasting a week at the summit, the song was quickly overtaken by the boyband that could do no wrong. Celebrating the 50th anniversary of the UK charts, since when they first started back in 1952, the 941st No.1 came from Westlife yet again, with their 11th No. 1 single, "Unbreakable". This gave them more chart toppers than the queen of pop herself, Madonna. Only Elvis Presley, the Beatles and Cliff Richard had received more No. 1 singles than Westlife now. After a week, US superstar, Christina Aguilera returned to the top of the UK charts for the 3rd time promoting a new raunchier image with her first single from her second album, Stripped. "Dirrty" came with an overtly sexual video and despite its massive popularity in the UK, it failed to reach the Top 20 in her US homeland.

US rock band, the Foo Fighters scored their first No. 1 album with their fourth release, One By One. All of the band's three previous albums had gone Top 10, two of them going Top 3. However, after a week, the singer David Gray took over from them with his second album, A New Day At Midnight. It stayed on top for a week but was nowhere near as successful as its predecessor, White Ladder. Blue returned to the top of the album chart, again for one week only, with their second release, One Love, which would provide them with three more top 10 hits, including their third and final UK No. 1 the following month. Compiling all of their singles to date, boyband Westlife released Unbreakable – The Greatest Hits – Vol 1 containing their 11 No. 1 singles and other hits. It was quickly knocked off by the biggest selling album of the year, which topped the charts all through December and part of January.

==== December ====
Twelve months after he hit the top with his debut single, Daniel Bedingfield returned to the top with a slow ballad, "If You're Not The One". It became his 2nd UK No. 1 and was the third release from his debut album, Gotta Get Thru This, which despite producing 5 Top 10 singles and 6 Top 40 hits only managed to make No. 13 in the albums chart. A fourth chart topper confirmed Eminem as the most successful rapper in UK chart history. The song, "Lose Yourself" is taken from the soundtrack to his own film, 8 Mile, which also proved very popular. The song also topped the charts in the US. Boy band Blue returned to the top of the UK charts for the 3rd time collaborating with Elton John to revive an old hit of his, "Sorry Seems To Be The Hardest Word". Amazingly, despite charting for 31 years, this was only Elton's 5th UK No. 1 single. Popstars: The Rivals became the new phenomenon in the world of talent shows and it produced 2 new acts, boyband One True Voice and girl group Girls Aloud. They both released their singles in Christmas week and the girls beat the boys to the top spot, claiming the Christmas number one with their debut single, "Sound of the Underground". The song topped the charts for 4 weeks, and escalated them to great fame. They have had continued success for 6 years releasing 20 top 10 singles and 6 successful albums, but One True Voice quickly disappeared from the music scene after just one more hit.

Robbie Williams took the Christmas number one album spot yet again with his fifth No. 1 album, Escapology. The album contained the massive single hit, "Feel" and the soon to be single hits, "Come Undone", "Something Beautiful" and "Sexed Up". The album remained on top for 6 weeks, becoming the longest stay at the top since he himself topped the charts last year in December, when Swing When You're Winning topped the charts for 7 weeks. Amazingly, the album did return to the top the following year almost nine months after it was first released. It became one of the few albums to drop out of the Top 40 and climb back in to reach the top spot again.

== Classical music ==
The year produced several new classical works by British composers, including Derek Bourgeois's Symphony No. 9 and Peter Maxwell Davies's Naxos Quartet No. 1. The biggest classical hit of 2002, however, was Tolga Kashif's Queen Symphony, which used themes from works by Queen to create a full-length orchestral work. Patrick Hawes wrote his first film score, for The Incredible Mrs Ritchie, directed by Paul Johansson.

Howard Goodall followed up his earlier successful TV series Howard Goodall's Big Bangs with Howard Goodall's Great Dates, in which he focused on significant dates in the history of music.

== Charts ==
=== Number-one singles ===
Chart date (week ending)	Song	Artist(s)	Sales
5 January	"Somethin' Stupid"	Robbie Williams & Nicole Kidman	68,000
12 January	"Gotta Get Thru This"	Daniel Bedingfield	27,000
19 January	"More Than a Woman"	Aaliyah	30,081
26 January	"My Sweet Lord"	George Harrison	66,567
2 February	"Hero"	Enrique Iglesias	101,056
9 February	"Hero"	Enrique Iglesias	98,388
16 February	"Hero"	Enrique Iglesias	82,000
23 February	"Hero"	Enrique Iglesias	100,000
2 March	"World of Our Own"	Westlife	102,000
9 March	"Anything Is Possible" / "Evergreen"	Will Young	1,108,659
16 March	"Anything Is Possible" / "Evergreen"	Will Young	377,074
23 March	"Anything Is Possible" / "Evergreen"	Will Young	100,000
30 March	"Unchained Melody"	Gareth Gates	850,535
6 April	"Unchained Melody"	Gareth Gates	228,477
13 April	"Unchained Melody"	Gareth Gates	102,321
20 April	"Unchained Melody"	Gareth Gates	83,500
27 April	"The Hindu Times"	Oasis	116,321
4 May	"Freak Like Me"	Sugababes	85,500
11 May	"Kiss Kiss"	Holly Valance	143,408
18 May	"If Tomorrow Never Comes"	Ronan Keating	147,610
25 May	"Just a Little"	Liberty X	153,219
1 June	"Without Me"	Eminem	185,500
8 June	"Light My Fire"	Will Young	177,000
15 June	"Light My Fire"	Will Young	62,000
22 June	"A Little Less Conversation"	Elvis vs JXL	243,301
29 June	"A Little Less Conversation"	Elvis vs JXL	133,000
6 July	"A Little Less Conversation"	Elvis vs JXL	85,500
13 July	"A Little Less Conversation"	Elvis vs JXL	57,900
20 July	"Anyone of Us (Stupid Mistake)"	Gareth Gates	241,000
27 July	"Anyone of Us (Stupid Mistake)"	Gareth Gates	105,000
3 August	"Anyone of Us (Stupid Mistake)"	Gareth Gates	67,000
10 August	"Colourblind"	Darius	111,000
17 August	"Colourblind"	Darius	62,000
24 August	"Round Round"	Sugababes	79,000
31 August	"Crossroads"	Blazin' Squad	53,000
7 September	"The Tide Is High (Get the Feeling)"	Atomic Kitten	144,000
14 September	"The Tide Is High (Get the Feeling)"	Atomic Kitten	67,000
21 September	"The Tide Is High (Get the Feeling)"	Atomic Kitten	46,000
28 September	"Just Like a Pill"	Pink	49,000
5 October	"The Long and Winding Road" / "Suspicious Minds" / "Sweetest Feeling"	Will Young & Gareth Gates	132,500
12 October	"The Long and Winding Road" / "Suspicious Minds" / "Sweetest Feeling"	Will Young & Gareth Gates	65,000
19 October	"The Ketchup Song (Aserejé)"	Las Ketchup	105,000
26 October	"Dilemma"	Nelly featuring Kelly Rowland	200,000
2 November	"Dilemma"	Nelly featuring Kelly Rowland	129,000
9 November	"Heaven"	DJ Sammy & Yanou featuring Do	119,000
16 November	"Unbreakable"	Westlife	90,000
23 November	"Dirrty"	Christina Aguilera featuring Redman	74,000
30 November	"Dirrty"	Christina Aguilera featuring Redman	47,000
7 December	"If You're Not the One"	Daniel Bedingfield	74,500
14 December	"Lose Yourself"	Eminem	91,000
21 December	"Sorry Seems to Be the Hardest Word"	Blue featuring Elton John	87,000
28 December	"Sound of the Underground"	Girls Aloud	213,140

=== Number-one albums ===
Chart date (week ending)	Album	Artist	Sales
5 January	Swing When You're Winning	Robbie Williams	180,000
12 January	Swing When You're Winning	Robbie Williams	47,000
19 January	Just Enough Education to Perform	Stereophonics	41,000
26 January	Just Enough Education to Perform	Stereophonics	45,000
2 February	Just Enough Education to Perform	Stereophonics	40,000
9 February	Come with Us	The Chemical Brothers	49,500
16 February	Escape	Enrique Iglesias	38,500
23 February	Escape	Enrique Iglesias	57,750
2 March	The Very Best of Sting & The Police	Sting & The Police	38,000
9 March	The Very Best of Sting & The Police	Sting & The Police	59,000
16 March	The Essential Barbra Streisand	Barbra Streisand	79,167
23 March	Silver Side Up	Nickelback	38,000
30 March	Silver Side Up	Nickelback	39,000
6 April	A New Day Has Come	Celine Dion	89,000
13 April	A New Day Has Come	Celine Dion	39,000
20 April	A New Day Has Come	Celine Dion	32,000
27 April	A New Day Has Come	Celine Dion	26,500
4 May	All Rise	Blue	23,917
11 May	The Last Broadcast	Doves	52,000
18 May	The Last Broadcast	Doves	22,500
25 May	18	Moby	51,658
1 June	Destination	Ronan Keating	123,000
8 June	The Eminem Show	Eminem	228,297
15 June	The Eminem Show	Eminem	87,000
22 June	The Eminem Show	Eminem	59,000
29 June	The Eminem Show	Eminem	47,000
6 July	The Eminem Show	Eminem	44,000
13 July	Heathen Chemistry	Oasis	230,551
20 July	By the Way	Red Hot Chili Peppers	134,055
27 July	By the Way	Red Hot Chili Peppers	72,000
3 August	By the Way	Red Hot Chili Peppers	56,700
10 August	The Rising	Bruce Springsteen	57,071
17 August	By the Way	Red Hot Chili Peppers	36,000
24 August	By the Way	Red Hot Chili Peppers	31,000
31 August	Imagine	Eva Cassidy	57,500
7 September	A Rush of Blood to the Head	Coldplay	273,924
14 September	A Rush of Blood to the Head	Coldplay	108,000
21 September	Feels So Good	Atomic Kitten	80,000
28 September	Illumination	Paul Weller	54,000
5 October	ELV1S: 30 #1 Hits	Elvis Presley	134,000
12 October	ELV1S: 30 #1 Hits	Elvis Presley	99,840
19 October	From Now On	Will Young	187,350
26 October	From Now On	Will Young	59,000
2 November	One by One	Foo Fighters	91,471
9 November	A New Day at Midnight	David Gray	118,000
16 November	One Love	Blue	117,500
23 November	Unbreakable – The Greatest Hits Vol. 1	Westlife	188,000
30 November	Escapology	Robbie Williams	264,104
7 December	Escapology	Robbie Williams	187,000
14 December	Escapology	Robbie Williams	195,000
21 December	Escapology	Robbie Williams	229,000
28 December	Escapology	Robbie Williams	310,000

=== Number-one compilation albums ===
Chart date (week ending)	Album
5 January	Now 50
12 January	Now 50
19 January	Clubbers Guide to 2002
26 January	Clubbers Guide to 2002
2 February	Clubbers Guide to 2002
9 February	Best Club Anthems 2002
16 February	Club Mix 2002
23 February	Love So Strong
2 March	School Disco.com – Spring Term
9 March	School Disco.com – Spring Term
16 March	New Woman 2002
23 March	Supercharged
30 March	Supercharged
6 April	Now 51
13 April	Now 51
20 April	Pop Idol – The Big Band Album
27 April	Pop Idol – The Big Band Album
4 May	Pop Idol – The Big Band Album
11 May	Pop Idol – The Big Band Album
18 May	Now 51
25 May	Kisstory
1 June	The Best Summer Album 2002
8 June	Clubbers Guide to Ibiza 2002
15 June	Smash Hits Summer 2002
22 June	Capital Gold Rock Legends
29 June	The Very Best of MTV Unplugged
6 July	Clubland
13 July	Clubland
20 July	Clubland
27 July	Clubland
3 August	Now 52
10 August	Now 52
17 August	Now 52
24 August	Now 52
31 August	Now 52
7 September	The Very Best of Pure R&B: The Summer
14 September	Smash Hits: Let's Party
21 September	Smash Hits: Let's Party
28 September	Smash Hits: Let's Party
5 October	Smash Hits: Let's Party
12 October	Smash Hits: Let's Party
19 October	New Women: The Autumn Collection
26 October	New Women: The Autumn Collection
2 November	Hits 54
9 November	Hits 54
16 November	The Annual 2023
23 November	Clubland II
30 November	Now 53
7 December	Now 53
14 December	Now 53
21 December	Now 53
28 December	Now 53

== Year-end charts ==
Between 29 December 2001 and 28 December 2002.

=== Best-selling singles ===
No.	Title	Artist	Peak position	Sales
1	"Anything Is Possible"/"Evergreen"	Will Young	1	1,783,919
2	"Unchained Melody"	Gareth Gates	1	1,329,740
3	"Hero"	Enrique Iglesias	1	689,279
4	"Dilemma"	Nelly featuring Kelly Rowland	1	659,662
5	"A Little Less Conversation"	Elvis vs JXL	1	634,364
6	"Anyone of Us (Stupid Mistake)"	Gareth Gates	1	573,125
7	"Whenever, Wherever"	Shakira	2	554,756
8	"The Ketchup Song (Aserejé)"	Las Ketchup	1	538,591
9	"Just a Little"	Liberty X	1	487,037
10	"Without Me"	Eminem	1	486,138
11	"If Tomorrow Never Comes"	Ronan Keating	1	
12	"How You Remind Me"	Nickelback	4	
13	"The Tide Is High (Get the Feeling)"	Atomic Kitten	1	
14	"Kiss Kiss"	Holly Valance	1	
15	"The Logical Song"	Scooter	2	
16	"Light My Fire"	Will Young	1	
17	"Sound of the Underground"	Girls Aloud	1	
18	"Colourblind"	Darius	1	
19	"Heaven"	DJ Sammy & Yanou featuring Do	1	
20	"Me Julie"	Ali G and Shaggy	2	
21	"Get the Party Started"	Pink	2	
22	"The Long and Winding Road"/"Suspicious Minds"	Will Young and Gareth Gates/Gareth Gates	1	
23	"One Step Closer"	S Club Juniors	2	
24	"Cheeky Song (Touch My Bum)"	The Cheeky Girls	2	
25	"If You're Not the One"	Daniel Bedingfield	1	
26	"Something"	Lasgo	4	
27	"Hot in Herre"	Nelly	4	
28	"Freak like Me"	Sugababes	1	
29	"Nu Flow"	Big Brovaz	3	
30	"Dirrty"	Christina Aguilera featuring Redman	1	
31	"Round Round"	Sugababes	1	
32	"Lose Yourself"	Eminem	1	
33	"Like I Love You"	Justin Timberlake	2	
34	"Sorry Seems to Be the Hardest Word"	Blue featuring Elton John	1	
35	"It's OK!"	Atomic Kitten	3	
36	"Complicated"	Avril Lavigne	3	
37	"Addicted to Bass"	Puretone	2	
38	"Sacred Trust"/"After You're Gone (I'll Still Be Loving You)"	One True Voice	2	
39	"Hero"	Chad Kroeger featuring Josey Scott	4	
40	"World of Our Own"	Westlife	1	
41	"Underneath Your Clothes"	Shakira	3	
42	"Just Like a Pill"	Pink	1	
43	"The Hindu Times"	Oasis	1	
44	"Girlfriend"	NSYNC featuring Nelly	2	
45	"One Love"	Blue	3	
46	"Escape"	Enrique Iglesias	3	
47	"4 My People"	Missy "Misdemeanour" Elliott featuring Eve	5	
48	"Automatic High"	S Club Juniors	2	
49	"Insatiable"	Darren Hayes	8	
50	"Stop Crying Your Heart Out"	Oasis	2	

=== Best-selling albums ===
No.	Title	Artist	Peak position	Sales
1	Escapology	Robbie Williams	1	
2	Missundaztood	Pink	3 (Note: Reached number 2 in 2003)	
3	Escape	Enrique Iglesias	1	
4	A Rush of Blood to the Head	Coldplay	1	
5	One Love	Blue	1	
6	By the Way	Red Hot Chili Peppers	1	
7	The Eminem Show	Eminem	1	
8	Unbreakable: The Greatest Hits Volume 1	Westlife	1	
9	ELV1S: 30 #1 Hits	Elvis Presley	1	
10	Heathen Chemistry	Oasis	1	
11	Come Away with Me	Norah Jones	3 (Note: Reached number 1 in 2003)	
12	Silver Side Up	Nickelback	1	
13	A New Day at Midnight	David Gray	1	
14	Greatest Hits I, II & III (The Platinum Collection)	Queen	2	
15	Fever	Kylie Minogue	1	
16	Let Go	Avril Lavigne	4 (Note: Reached number 1 in 2003)	
17	Greatest Hits 1970–2002	Elton John	3	
18	From Now On	Will Young	1	
19	Forty Licks	The Rolling Stones	2	
20	Feels So Good	Atomic Kitten	1	
21	Laundry Service	Shakira	2	
22	Nellyville	Nelly	2	
23	Destination	Ronan Keating	1	
24	Just Enough Education to Perform	Stereophonics	1	
25	Angels with Dirty Faces	Sugababes	2	
26	All Rise	Blue	1	
27	No Angel	Dido	1	
28	Read My Lips	Sophie Ellis-Bextor	2	
29	Freak of Nature	Anastacia	4	
30	What My Heart Wants to Say	Gareth Gates	2	
31	Songs in A Minor	Alicia Keys	6	
32	Thinking It Over	Liberty X	3	
33	White Ladder	David Gray	1	
34	Nirvana	Nirvana	3	
35	Swing When You're Winning	Robbie Williams	1	
36	The Essential Barbra Streisand	Barbra Streisand	1	
37	Up!	Shania Twain	4	
38	Ashanti	Ashanti	3	
39	A New Day Has Come	Céline Dion	1	
40	Pain Is Love	Ja Rule	3	
41	18	Moby	1	
42	Imagine	Eva Cassidy	1	
43	Sentimento	Andrea Bocelli	7	
44	The Very Best of Sting & The Police	Sting and the Police	1	
45	The Best of 1990–2000 & B-Sides	U2	2	
46	Spin	Darren Hayes	2	
47	It Had to Be You: The Great American Songbook	Rod Stewart	8	
48	J to tha L-O! The Remixes	Jennifer Lopez	4	
49	No More Drama	Mary J. Blige	4	
50	A Funk Odyssey	Jamiroquai	1	

=== Best-selling compilations ===
No.	Title	Peak position
1	Now 53	1
2	Now 51	1
3	Now 52	1
4	Pop Idol: The Big Band Album	1
5	While My Guitar Gently Weeps	3
6	Clubland: The Ride of Your Life	1
7	Clubland II: The Ride of Your Life	1
8	Country Legends	2
9	The Annual 2003	1
10	Fame Academy	2

== See also ==
- List of UK Dance Singles Chart number ones of 2002
- List of UK Independent Singles Chart number ones of 2002
- List of UK Rock & Metal Singles Chart number ones of 2002
