= Acrobats (Looking for Balance) =

Single by Moony

from the album Lifestories
- Released: 2002
- Genre: House
- Length: 3:38
- Label: Warner Music Group; Airplane Records
- Songwriters: Monica Bragato; Andrea Salvato; Mullegarth
- Producers: Frankie Tamburo; Mauro Ferrucci

Moony singles chronology
"Dove (I'll Be Loving You)" (2002)	"Acrobats (Looking for Balance)" (2002)	"Flying Away" (2003)

Music video
- "Acrobats (Looking for Balance)" on YouTube

"Acrobats (Looking for Balance)" is a song by the Italian dance singer Moony. It was released in 2002 on Warner Music Group and Airplane Records as the second single and as well as the opening track from her debut studio album, Lifestories (2003). It is a house song that was written by Monica Bragato, Andrea Salvato and Mullegarth and produced by Frankie Tamburo and Mauro Ferrucci.

== Track listing ==
No.	Title	Length
1.	"Acrobats (Looking for Balance)" (T&F vs. Moltosugo radio edit)	3:42
2.	"Acrobats (Looking for Balance)" (album version)	3:34

== Charts ==
Chart (2002–03)	Peak position
Australia (ARIA)	106
Hungary (Editors' Choice Top 40)	20
Italy (FIMI)	24
Netherlands (Single Top 100)	80
UK Singles (OCC)	64
UK Dance (OCC)	33
