= Flying Away =

Single by Moony

from the album Lifestories
- Released: 2003
- Genre: House
- Length: 3:45
- Label: East West; Airplane
- Songwriters: Monica Bragato; Alfredo Comazzetto; Diego Broggio; Rossano Palù
- Producers: Frankie Tamburo; Mauro Ferrucci

Moony singles chronology
"Acrobats (Looking for Balance)" (2002)	"Flying Away" (2003)	"This Is Your Life" (2003)

Music video
- "Flying Away" on YouTube

"Flying Away" is a song by the Italian dance singer Moony. It was released in 2003 on East West Records and Airplane Records as the third single and as well as the fourth track from her debut studio album, Lifestories (2003). It is a house song that was written by Monica Bragato, Alfredo Comazzetto, Diego Broggio and Rossano Palù and produced by Frankie Tamburo and Mauro Ferrucci.

== Track listing ==
No.	Title	Length
1.	"Flying Away" (T&F vs. Moltosugo radio edit)	3:54
2.	"Flying Away" (A T Mendoza vs. Tibet radio mix)	3:38
3.	"Flying Away" (extended mix)	6:57
4.	"Flying Away" (Sam Paganini vocal mix)	9:02
5.	"Flying Away" (T&F vs. Moltosugo club mix)	7:00
6.	"Flying Away" (A T Mendoza vs. Tibet club mix)	5:44
7.	"Flying Away" (Sam Paganini dub mix)	8:32
8.	"Flying Away" (T&F vs. Moltosugo video clip)	3:54

== Charts ==
Chart (2003)	Peak position
Italy (FIMI)	34
