= Andrea Brown (R&B singer) =

American singer

- Born: May 21, 1982 (age 42); Brooklyn, Kings, New York, U.S.
- Occupation: Singer
- Instrument: Vocals
- Years active: 2001–present
- Labels: AM:PM, Groovilicious, Popular

Andrea Brown (born May 21, 1982) is a pop, house and R&B singer from Brooklyn, US. She is also the cousin of singer Bobby Brown.

In 2001, she scored a No. 1 Hot Dance Music/Club Play track as the lead vocalist on Goldtrix's cover of Jill Scott's "It's Love", retitled "It's Love (Trippin')".

== See also ==
- List of Billboard number-one dance club songs
- List of artists who reached number one on the U.S. Dance Club Songs chart
