= Goldtrix =

British musical duo

Goldtrix were a British house music duo from London, England, consisting of producers Daniel Goldstein and Matrix. Goldtrix is a play on the artists names: Goldstein + Matrix.

In 2001, they released a cover of Jill Scott's 2000 song "It's Love", retitled "It's Love (Trippin')", which hit number one on the U.S. Billboard Hot Dance Club Play chart, and No. 6 on the UK Singles Chart in February 2002. American singer Andrea Brown provided lead vocals.

== Discography ==
=== Singles ===
List of single, with UK and Australian chart positions
Title	Year	Peak chart positions		
Title	Year	UK	AUS	U.S. Dance
"It's Love (Trippin')" (featuring Andrea Brown)	2001-02	6	47	1

== See also ==
- List of Billboard number-one dance singles of 2002
- List of artists who reached number one on the US Dance chart
