= Dove (I'll Be Loving You) =

2002 single by Moony

Single by Moony

from the album Lifestories
- Released: 27 May 2002
- Studio: Moltosugo (Padova, Italy)
- Genre: House; pop dance
- Length: 6:34 (album version)
- Label: Airplane!
- Songwriters: Monica Bragato; Mauro Ferrucci; Francesco Giacomello; Tommy Vianello
- Producers: T&F

Moony singles chronology
"Dove (I'll Be Loving You)" (2002)	"Acrobats (Looking for Balance)" (2003)

"Dove (I'll Be Loving You)" is a song by Italian musician Moony, released on 27 May 2002 from her first album, Lifestories (2002), as her debut solo single. It achieved success in several European and Oceanian countries, becoming a top-20 hit in Denmark, Hungary, Italy, Romania, Spain, and the United Kingdom. "Dove" remains Moony's biggest solo hit. The music video was shot in Spain by Canadian director Stuart Gosling.

== Critical reception ==
Miriam Hubner of Music & Media magazine praised the song, complimenting Moony's "fresh" vocals and "cutting-edge" production. In Birmingham, 96.4 FM BRMB programme controller Adam Bridge said of the song, "I think it's a fresh, bright and funky piece of poppy dance music".

== Track listings ==
Italian CD single

1. "Dove (I'll Be Loving You)" (original radio mix) – 4:05
2. "Dove (I'll Be Loving You)" (T&F vs Moltosugo club mix) – 6:38
3. "Dove (I'll Be Loving You)" (Andrea T. Mendoza club remix) – 7:52
4. "Dove (I'll Be Loving You)" (Full Intention vocal mix) – 8:27

Italian 12-inch single

A. "Dove (I'll Be Loving You)" (T&F vs Moltosugo club mix) – 6:38
B. "Dove (I'll Be Loving You)" (Full Intention vocal mix) – 8:27

UK CD single

1. "Dove (I'll Be Loving You)" (T&F vs Moltosugo mix) – 4:02
2. "Dove (I'll Be Loving You)" (Full Intention vocal mix) – 8:28
3. "Dove (I'll Be Loving You)" (John Creamer & Stephane K remix) – 6:54
4. "Dove (I'll Be Loving You)" (enhanced video)

UK 12-inch single

A1. "Dove (I'll Be Loving You)" (T&F vs Moltosugo club mix) – 6:33
A2. "Dove (I'll Be Loving You)" (Full Intention vocal mix) – 8:18
AA1. "Dove (I'll Be Loving You)" (John Creamer & Stephane K remix) – 6:54

UK cassette single

1. "Dove (I'll Be Loving You)" (T&F vs Moltosugo radio mix) – 4:02
2. "Dove (I'll Be Loving You)" (Full Intention vocal mix) – 8:28
3. "Dove (I'll Be Loving You)" (Andrea T. Mendoza club remix) – 7:51

Canadian CD single

1. "Dove (I'll Be Loving You)" (T&F vs Moltosugo mix) – 4:02
2. "Dove (I'll Be Loving You)" (Full Intention vocal mix) – 8:28
3. "Dove (I'll Be Loving You)" (T&F vs. Moltosugo club mix) – 6:34
4. "Dove (I'll Be Loving You)" (enhanced video)
- The liner notes misprint the T&F vs. Moltosugo club mix as the John Creamer & Stephane K remix

Australian maxi-CD single

1. "Dove (I'll Be Loving You)" (T&F vs Moltosugo radio mix) – 4:02
2. "Dove (I'll Be Loving You)" (T&F vs Moltosugo club mix) – 6:35
3. "Dove (I'll Be Loving You)" (Full Intention vocal mix) – 8:30
4. "Dove (I'll Be Loving You)" (John Creamer & Stephane K vocal mix) – 9:54
5. "Dove (I'll Be Loving You)" (The Phil Fuldner Treatment) – 8:13

== Credits and personnel ==
Credits are lifted from the Italian CD single liner notes.

Studio

- Recorded and mixed at Moltosugo Studios (Padova, Italy)

Personnel

- Moony – writing (as Monica Bragato)
- Mauro Ferrucci – writing
- Francesco Giacomello – writing
- Tommy Vianello – writing
- Ingo Peter Schwartz – bass
- Sisco – piano
- J. Keller – drum programming
- T&F – production
- Roy Malone – recording, mixing
- Tommy Vee – editing

== Charts ==
=== Weekly charts ===
Weekly chart performance for "Dove (I'll Be Loving You)"
Chart (2002–2003)	Peak position
Australia (ARIA)	41
Australian Club Chart (ARIA)	1
Belgium (Ultratip Bubbling Under Flanders)	7
Belgium (Ultratip Bubbling Under Wallonia)	17
Canada (Nielsen SoundScan)	47
Denmark (Tracklisten)	15
Europe (Eurochart Hot 100)	36
France (SNEP)	41
Germany (GfK)	76
Greece (IFPI)	36
Hungary (Rádiós Top 40)	4
Hungary (Single Top 40)	7
Ireland (IRMA)	23
Ireland Dance (IRMA)	1
Italy (FIMI)	18
Netherlands (Dutch Top 40)	28
Netherlands (Single Top 100)	48
New Zealand (Recorded Music NZ)	21
Poland (PiF PaF)	4
Romania (Romanian Top 100)	9
Scotland Singles (Official Charts)	9
Spain (Promusicae)	13
Switzerland (Schweizer Hitparade)	26
UK Singles (Official Charts)	9
UK Dance (Official Charts)	3
US Dance Radio Airplay (Billboard)	18

=== Year-end charts ===
Year-end chart performance for "Dove (I'll Be Loving You)"
Chart (2002)	Position
Australian Club Chart (ARIA)	7
Canada (Nielsen SoundScan)	167
UK Singles (OCC)	169
UK Airplay (Music Week)	47

== Release history ==
Release dates and formats for "Dove (I'll Be Loving You)"
Region	Date	Format(s)	Label(s)	Ref.
Europe	27 May 2002	CD	EMI Electrola	
United Kingdom	3 June 2002	CD	Airplane!; Positiva; Cream	
Australia	24 June 2002	CD	Airplane!; Positiva; Cream	
