= Fly By II =

2002 single by Blue

Single by Blue

from the album All Rise
- B-side: "All Rise" (acoustic); "Love R.I.P."; "Megamix"
- Released: 18 March 2002
- Studio: StarGate (Norway)
- Length: 3:48
- Label: Virgin; Innocent
- Songwriters: Mikkel SE; Hallgeir Rustan; Tor Erik Hermansen; Simon Webbe
- Producer: StarGate

Blue singles chronology
"If You Come Back" (2001)	"Fly By II" (2002)	"Best in Me" (2002)

Music video
- "Fly By II" on YouTube

"Fly By II" is a song by English boy band Blue. It was released on 18 March 2002 as the fourth single from their debut studio album, All Rise (2001). The release includes the band's first non-album exclusive, "Love R.I.P". "Fly By II" is a remixed version of the All Rise album track "Fly By", which samples the song "Rise" by Herb Alpert, while the remix samples from the Notorious B.I.G.'s "Hypnotize". The remix reached number six on the UK Singles Chart.

== Music video ==
The video for "Fly by II" features Blue in a 2001 BMW X5 (E53) 4.4i, driving to an underground hangout, where the patrons partake in breakdancing, dominoes and rap battling. The members of Blue then proceed to go upstairs to a rave club, where they dance while performing. The video featured an appearance by Ricky Whittle.

== Track listings ==
UK and New Zealand CD single

1. "Fly By II" – 3:48
2. "All Rise" (acoustic) – 3:40
3. "Love R.I.P." – 3:38

UK cassette single and European CD single

1. "Fly By II" – 3:48
2. "Megamix" – 6:56

UK DVD single

1. "Fly By II" (video) – 3:49
2. "This Temptation" (Blacksmith RnB radio rub) – 4:31
3. "A Year in the Life Of..." – 1:30

European CD single

1. "Fly By" – 3:48
2. "Love R.I.P." – 3:38

Australian CD single

1. "Fly By II" – 3:49
2. "All Rise" (acoustic version) – 3:40
3. "Love R.I.P." – 3:38
4. "This Temptation" (Blacksmith RnB rub) – 4:30
5. "Megamix" – 6:56

== Credits and personnel ==
Credits are taken from the All Rise album booklet.

Studios

- Recorded and mixed at StarGate Studios (Norway)
- Vocals recorded at Metropolis Studios (London, England)
- Additional vocals recorded at Studio 1 (Oslo, Norway)
- Mastered at Sterling Sound (New York City) and Sony Music Studios (London, England)

Personnel

- StarGate – production
  - Mikkel SE – writing, all instruments
  - Hallgeir Rustan – writing, all instruments
  - Tor Erik Hermansen – writing, all instruments
- Simon Webbe – writing
- Blue – all vocals
- Neil Tucker – engineering
- Chris Sansom – additional vocals engineering
- Tom Coyne – mastering
- John Davis – mastering

== Charts ==
=== Weekly charts ===
Weekly chart performance for "Fly By II"
Chart (2002)	Peak position
Australia (ARIA)	26
Austria (Ö3 Austria Top 40)	65
Belgium (Ultratop 50 Flanders)	23
Canada (Nielsen SoundScan)	27
Europe (Eurochart Hot 100)	42
Europe (European Hit Radio)	24
Germany (GfK)	45
Ireland (IRMA)	16
Netherlands (Dutch Top 40 Tipparade)	7
Netherlands (Single Top 100)	58
New Zealand (Recorded Music NZ)	9
Poland Airplay (PiF PaF)	8
Romania (Romanian Top 100)	96
Scottish Singles Sales (Official Charts)	8
Spain Airplay (Top 40 Radio)	25
Sweden (Sverigetopplistan)	33
Switzerland (Schweizer Hitparade)	65
UK Singles (Official Charts)	6
UK Airplay (Music Week)	1

=== Year-end charts ===
Year-end chart performance for "Fly By II"
Chart (2002)	Position
Canada (Nielsen SoundScan)	185
Europe (European Hit Radio)	66
Ireland (IRMA)	94
New Zealand (RIANZ)	36
UK Singles (OCC)	61
UK Airplay (Music Week)	5

== Certifications and sales ==
Certifications and sales for "Fly By II"
Region	Certification	Certified units/sales
United Kingdom (BPI)	Silver	200,000^{‡}
^{‡} Sales+streaming figures based on certification alone.

== Release history ==
Release dates and formats for "Fly By II"
Region	Date	Format(s)	Label(s)	Ref.
United Kingdom	18 March 2002	CD; cassette	Virgin; Innocent	
Australia	10 June 2002	CD	Virgin; Innocent	
Canada	11 June 2002	CD	Virgin	
