= Point of View (DB Boulevard song) =

2002 single by DB Boulevard

Single by DB Boulevard
- B-side: "Point of Dub"
- Released: 11 February 2002 (UK)
- Studio: Recycle (Sacile, Italy)
- Length: 5:30; 3:50 (radio edit)
- Label: Airplane!; Illustrious
- Songwriters: Alfredo Comazzetto; Monica Bragato; Deck D'Arcy; Laurent Brancowitz; Thomas Mars Jr.; Christian Mazzalai
- Producer: DB Boulevard

DB Boulevard singles chronology
"Point of View" (2002)	"Believe" (2002)

Music video
- "Point of View" on YouTube

"Point of View" is a song by Italian electronic music group DB Boulevard, written by Alfredo Comazzetto and vocalist Moony under her real name, Monica Bragato. The song is based around a sample of "Heatwave" by French band Phoenix, so Deck D'Arcy, Laurent Brancowitz, Thomas Mars Jr., and Christian Mazzalai are also credited as writers. "Point of View" became a chart hit in Europe and Australia and topped the US Billboard Dance Club Play chart.

== Music video ==
The music video of the song features Moony as a computer-animated cardboard woman in a world all made out of a cardboard box. She leaves her apartment and enters a small car driving through town, only for her to see herself on a billboard. Moony imagines her performing with her band in the climax.

== Track listings ==
Italian CD single

1. "Point of View" (T&F Crushed Broggio radio edit) – 3:42
2. "Point of View" (Pianopella) – 4:00
3. "Point of View" (Broggio club mix) – 5:46

Italian 12-inch single

A1. "Point of View" (Molella vs. Gabry Ponte remix) – 6:17
B1. "Point of Dub" (Lange remix) – 6:27
B2. "Point of View" (Broggio club mix) – 5:40

European CD single

1. "Point of View" (radio edit) – 3:40
2. "Point of Dub" (Lange remix) – 8:10

UK CD single

1. "Point of View" (radio edit) – 3:50
2. "Point of View" (original club mix) – 5:35
3. "Point of Dub" (Lange remix) – 6:27
4. "Point of View" (video)

UK 12-inch single

A1. "Point of View" (original club mix) – 5:35
A2. "Point of Dub" (Lange remix) – 6:27
AA. "Point of Dub" (Quivver's vocal mix) – 7:44

UK cassette single

1. "Point of View" (radio edit) – 3:50
2. "Point of View" (original club mix) – 5:35
3. "Point of Dub" (Audio Drive's Easy Life remix) – 7:40

Australian CD single

1. "Point of View" (radio edit) – 3:50
2. "Point of View" (original club mix) – 5:35
3. "Point of Dub" (Lange remix) – 6:27

== Credits and personnel ==
Credits are lifted from the UK CD single liner notes.

Studios

- Recorded at Recycle Studio (Sacile, Italy)
- Mixed at Moltosugo Studios (Padova, Italy)

Personnel

- Alfredo Comazzetto – writing
- Moony – writing (as Monica Bragato), vocals
- Deck D'Arcy – writing ("Heatwave", titled "Acapulco Mix" on liner notes)
- Laurent Brancowitz – writing ("Heatwave")
- Thomas Mars Jr. – writing ("Heatwave")
- Christian Mazzalai – writing ("Heatwave")
- DB Boulevard – production, arrangement
- Roy Malone – mixing
- Frankie Tamburo – executive production
- Mauro Ferrucci – executive production

== Charts ==
=== Weekly charts ===
Chart (2002)	Peak position
Australia (ARIA)	21
Australian Club Chart (ARIA)	1
Australian Dance (ARIA)	3
Belgium (Ultratop 50 Flanders)	12
Belgium (Ultratop 50 Wallonia)	32
Denmark (Tracklisten)	16
Europe (Eurochart Hot 100)	25
Germany (GfK)	68
Greece (IFPI)	24
Hungary (Rádiós Top 40)	13
Ireland (IRMA)	11
Ireland Dance (IRMA)	2
Italy (FIMI)	6
Netherlands (Dutch Top 40)	37
Netherlands (Single Top 100)	33
New Zealand (Recorded Music NZ)	17
Romania (Romanian Top 100)	30
Scotland Singles (OCC)	2
Spain (Promusicae)	6
Switzerland (Schweizer Hitparade)	48
UK Singles (OCC)	3
UK Dance (OCC)	3
US Dance Club Songs (Billboard)	1

=== Year-end charts ===
Chart (2002)	Position
Australian Club Chart (ARIA)	4
Belgium (Ultratop 50 Flanders)	65
Ireland (IRMA)	92
Italy (FIMI)	27
UK Singles (OCC)	69

== Certifications ==
Region	Certification	Certified units/sales
Italy (FIMI)	Platinum	50,000^{*}
United Kingdom (BPI)	Silver	200,000^{‡}
^{*} Sales figures based on certification alone.^{‡} Sales+streaming figures based on certification alone.

== Release history ==
Region	Date	Format(s)	Label(s)	Ref.
Italy	2002	12-inch vinyl; CD	Airplane!	
United Kingdom	11 February 2002	12-inch vinyl; CD; cassette	Illustrious	
Australia	11 March 2002	CD	Illustrious	
United States	15 April 2002	Adult contemporary; contemporary hit radio	Epic	
United States	22 April 2002	Rhythmic contemporary radio	Epic	
