= Illumination (Paul Weller album) =

Studio album by Paul Weller
- Released: 16 September 2002
- Studio: Black Barn Studio & Wheeler end
- Genre: Rock
- Length: 47:39
- Label: Independiente Records
- Producer: Paul Weller, Simon Dine (engineered by Jan "Stan" Kybert & Charles Rees)

Paul Weller chronology
Days of Speed (2001)	Illumination (2002)	Fly on the Wall - B Sides and Rarities (2003)

Illumination is the sixth solo studio album by the English singer-songwriter Paul Weller, released on 16 September 2002. "Call Me No.5" is a duet with Kelly Jones of Stereophonics, and "One X One" features Gem Archer on acoustic guitar and Noel Gallagher of Oasis on drums, percussion and bass.

== Critical reception ==
Professional ratings
Review scores
Source	Rating
AllMusic	4.5/5 stars
The Guardian	4/5 stars
Rolling Stone	3/5 stars

Initial critical response to Illumination was positive. At Metacritic, which assigns a normalized rating out of 100 to reviews from mainstream critics, the album has received an average score of 79, based on 12 reviews.

== Track listing ==
All songs written by Paul Weller, unless stated otherwise:

1. "Going Places" – 3:34
2. "A Bullet for Everyone" – 4:11
3. "Leafy Mysteries" – 3:07
4. "It's Written in the Stars" – 3:11
5. "Who Brings Joy" – 3:30
6. "Now the Night Is Here" (Simon Dine, Paul Weller) – 3:53
7. "Spring (At Last)" – 2:28
8. "One X One" – 5:35
9. "Bag Man" – 3:22
10. "All Good Books" – 3:25
11. "Call Me No.5" (Kelly Jones, Paul Weller) – 3:28
12. "Standing Out in the Universe" – 4:50
13. "Illumination" – 3:06

The deluxe CD release featured three additional tracks:

1. "Horseshoe Drama" – 3:38
2. "Push Button, Automatic" – 3:21
3. "Talisman" – 3:46

== Personnel ==
- Paul Weller – vocals, guitar
- Noel Gallagher – special guest (bass, drums, percussion)
- Simon Dine – effects, brass
- Steve Cradock – guitar
- Seamus Beaghen – keyboards
- Kelly Jones – vocals
- Gem Archer – acoustic guitar
- Jocelyn Brown – backing vocals
- Aziz Ibrahim – guitar, sarod, tamboura
- Carleen Anderson – backing vocals
- Damon Minchella – bass
- Steve White – drums

== Charts ==
=== Weekly charts ===
Chart (2002)	Peak position
Australian Albums (ARIA)	74
Dutch Albums (Album Top 100)	69
German Albums (Offizielle Top 100)	69
Scottish Albums (OCC)	3
UK Albums (OCC)	1
US Independent Albums (Billboard)	20

Chart (2005)	Peak position
UK Independent Albums (OCC)	21

=== Year-end charts ===
Chart (2002)	Position
UK Albums (OCC)	114
