= Moony =

Italian singer

- Born: Monica Bragato; 27 September 1980 (age 45); Italy
- Genres: Electronic
- Years active: 1998–present
- Label: Airplane Records
- Website: moony.it

Monica "Moony" Bragato (born 27 September 1980) is an Italian singer. She is best known as the vocalist on DB Boulevard's hit single "Point of View", as well as for her own single "Dove (I'll Be Loving You)".

Raised in Venice, Moony was first noticed singing in the Venetian club scene and was asked to provide vocals for a number of songs by DJ and producer Spiller. The first single was "Positive", in 1998, sampled "Physical", the song of Olivia Newton-John, and the second single with Spiller was "Batucada" (1999). She also featured in the project, Angel Moon, in the song "He's All I Want", released in 1998.

Her first major success was "Point of View" as part of the group DB Boulevard. That song became popular across the European dance music scene, and entered the UK Singles Chart at number three. It earned DB Boulevard the distinction of being the first Italian music group to be nominated in the MTV Europe Music Awards. From there on, she launched her solo career. The first single "Dove (I'll Be Loving You)" was a commercial success and entered the UK Singles Chart on 15 June 2002 at No. 9, spending 13 weeks in the top 75. She released her debut album Lifestories in 2003.

The follow-up single 'Acrobats' was released on 3 March 2003. This saw moderate success, entering the UK Singles Chart at No. 64, spending just two weeks in the top 75. This was to be her last appearance on the UK Singles Chart.

In June 2006, Moony released "For Your Love", and in July 2008, "I Don't Know Why". In June 2009, she released a second album, 4 Your Love in Japan, featuring previously released material and some new tracks.

== Discography ==
=== Albums ===
- Lifestories (2003)
- 4 Your Love (2009)

=== Singles ===
Year	Single	Peak chart positions							Album
Year	Single	ITA	AUS	BRA	POR	NLD	SPA	UK	Album
2001	"Point of View" (with DB Boulevard)	6	21	—	—	33	6	3	Frequencies
2002	"Dove (I'll Be Loving You)"	18	41	—	—	48	13	9	Lifestories
2003	"Acrobats (Looking for Balance)"	24	106	—	—	80	—	64	Lifestories
2003	"Flying Away"	34	—	—	—	—	—	—	Lifestories
2003	"This Is Your Life"	—	—	—	—	—	—	—	Lifestories
2005	"De Fact" (T&F vs Moltosugo feat. Moony)	22	—	—	—	—	—	—	4 Your Love
2006	"For Your Love"	38	—	—	—	—	—	—	4 Your Love
2008	"I Don't Know Why"	—	—	13	11	—	—	—	4 Your Love

=== Collaborations ===
- Spiller – "Positive" (1998)
- Angel Moon – "He's All I Want" (1998)
- Spiller – "Batucada" (1999)
- DB Boulevard – "Point of View" (2002)
- DB Boulevard – "Believe" (backing vocals) (2002)
- T&F vs Moltosugo feat. Moony – "De Fact" (2005)
- Ricky Luchini ft. Moony – "Little Bird" (2008)
- Robbie Rivera – "You Got to Make It" (vocals and writing credits) (2009)
