= DB Boulevard =

Italian electronic music group

- Origin: Padua, Italy
- Genres: Electronic; house; electronic rock
- Years active: 2001–2006
- Label: Airplane!
- Past members: Moony (Monica Bragato); Alfred Azzetto; Diego Broggio; Mauro Ferrucci

DB Boulevard was an Italian electronic music group consisting of vocalist Moony (Monica Bragato), along with producers/musicians Alfred Azzetto, Diego Broggio and Mauro Ferrucci.

The band formed in Padua in 2001. In 2002, their song "Point of View" peaked at number 1 on the Billboard Hot Dance Club Play chart in the US and at number 3 on the UK Singles Chart. It features a re-recorded snippet of a song called "Heatwave" by French band Phoenix, which was released as a single in 1999. The video clip of the song featured a computer-animated cardboard woman. "Point of View" was used by Sky Sports in their Speedway Grand Prix coverage. It was also used in Sex and the City's fifth-season episode "Cover Girl". In Australia, the song was played frequently on the Seven Network. DB Boulevard's first album, Frequencies was recorded in 2004 supported by the single "Better Day" but failed to chart.

DB Boulevard broke up in 2006 but briefly reunited to release a new single in 2022, "Chance of a Miracle".

== Discography ==
=== Studio albums ===
Title	Album details
Frequencies	Released: 2004; Label: Airplane! Records

=== Singles ===
Year	Title	Peak chart positions												Album
Year	Title	ITA	SPA	AUS	BEL	DEN	GER	IRE	NED	NZ	SCO	SWI	UK	Album
2002	"Point of View"	6	6	21	12	16	68	11	33	17	2	48	3	Frequencies
2002	"Believe"	12	8	—	—	—	—	—	—	—	—	—	—	Frequencies
2003	"Hard Frequency"	39	—	—	—	—	—	—	—	—	—	—	—	Frequencies
2004	"Basterà"	38	—	—	—	—	—	—	—	—	—	—	—	Frequencies
2004	"Pronta a Splendere (Better Day)"	—	—	—	—	—	—	—	—	—	—	—	—	Non-album singles
2006	"Chance of a Miracle"	—	—	—	—	—	—	—	—	—	—	—	—	Non-album singles
"—" denotes items that did not chart or were not released in that territory.

== See also ==
- List of artists who reached number one on the U.S. Dance Club Songs chart
