= Matt Prime =

- Born: Matthew Prime
- Origin: London, England
- Genres: Pop, Rock
- Occupations: Musician, Songwriter, Producer
- Instrument: Piano · Guitar · Bass
- Years active: 2002–present

Matt Prime is an English songwriter and record producer based in the UK.

== Biography ==
Prime grew up in Somerset and studied music at university in London. After graduating he secured a publishing deal with Sony/ATV and has since written over fifteen Top 10 hit singles, five Top 5 UK singles and a US Billboard Chart number one single. His writing and production credits include: Sam Smith, Charlie Puth, Aloe Blacc, Jason Derulo, CeeLo Green, The Script, Jake Bugg, Trey Songz, Kylie Minogue, Maverick Sabre, JP Cooper, James Blunt, The Vamps, Olly Murs, and Eliza Doolittle among others.

== Selected songwriting/production credits ==
Artist	Title	Info
Sam Smith	"Like I Can"	Single from number one album In the Lonely Hour
Charlie Puth	"One Call Away"	#1 Billboard Adult Top 40 single from album Nine Track Mind
Aloe Blacc	"My Way"	Lead single from album All Love Everything
Aloe Blacc	"Corner"	From album All Love Everything
Jason Derulo	"Talk With Your Body"	From the album 2 Sides
Trey Songz	"Never Again"	Second single from number one Billboard 200 album Chapter V
CeeLo Green	"Only You"	Lead single from album Heart Blanche
The Script	"Home Is Where The Hurt Is"	Third single from album Satellites
JP Cooper/Gabrielle Aplin	"Losing Me"	Lead single from album Dear Happy
Plested	"Lost For Words"	Single from debut album
Sea Girls	"Accident Waiting to Happen"	Single from debut album and Dirt 5 soundtrack
Banners	"Serenade"	Second single from debut album
Jake Bugg	"Simple As This"	From number one UK album Jake Bugg
James Blunt	"5 Miles"	From album Once Upon a Mind
Earl	"Tongue Tied"	Lead single from debut album Tongue Tied
Maverick Sabre	"Let Me Go"	Lead single from number one album Lonely Are the Brave
Paper Aeroplanes	"Lifelight"	Lead single from album The Day We Ran Into The Sea
Maverick Sabre	"These Days"	Third single from Lonely Are the Brave
Eliza Doolittle	"Skinny Genes"	Lead single from the debut album Eliza Doolitle
Eliza Doolittle	"Pack Up"	Second single from the debut album Eliza Doolitle
Eliza Doolittle	"Moneybox"	From the debut album Eliza Doolittle
Kylie Minogue	"Can't Beat The Feeling"	From number one UK album Aphrodite
Kylie Minogue	"Cosmic"	From number one UK album X
Kylie Minogue	"White December", "Cried Out Christmas"	From album Kylie Christmas
The Vamps	"Risk It All", "Girls on TV", "Shout About It"	From Debut album Meet the Vamps
The Vamps	"Half Way There", "Stolen Moments"	From the album Wake Up
Olly Murs	"Ready For Love"	From number one UK album Never Been Better
Olly Murs	"The One"	From number one UK album Right Place Right Time
Olly Murs	"Just Smile"	From number one UK album In Case You Didn't Know
Olly Murs	"Change Is Gonna Come"	From number one UK debut album Olly Murs
Will Young	"Grace"	Second single from number one UK album Let It Go
McBusted	"Before You Knew Me"	From album McBusted
Josh Osho ft. Ghostface Killah	"Redemption Days"	Lead single from the debut album L.i.f.e
Josh Osho ft. Childish Gambino	"Giants"	Second single from the debut album L.i.f.e
Rox	"Breakfast in Bed"	From the album Memoirs
Josh Gracin	"Found"	From US album We Weren't Crazy
Sophie Ellis Bextor	"Me and My Imagination"	Second single from album Trip the Light Fantastic
Jamelia	"Do Me Right", "Window Shopping", "Ain't A Love Got It So Good", "Hustle"	From the album Walk With Me
Simon Webbe	"Lay Your Hands", "No Worries", "After All This Time"	Three singles from debut album Sanctuary
Simon Webbe	"Coming Around Again", "Grace"	Two singles from album Grace
Natalie Imbruglia	"Counting Down The Days"	Second single from the number one UK album Counting Down the Days
