= Simon Webbe discography =

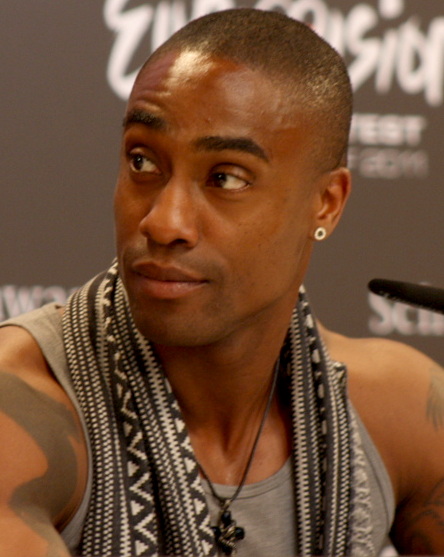
- Studio albums: 3
- Live albums: 1
- Singles: 11

The discography of English singer-songwriter Simon Webbe consists of eleven singles, three studio albums and one live album.

== Studio albums ==
List of albums, with selected chart positions and certifications
Title	Album details	Peak chart positions									Certifications
Title	Album details	UK	AUT	BEL	GER	JAP	ITA	NL	POR	SWI	Certifications
Sanctuary	Released: November 14, 2005; Label: Innocent Records; Format: CD, LP, digital download	7	—	—	96	142	20	19	—	45	UK: 2× Platinum
Grace	Released: November 13, 2006; Label: Innocent Records; Format: CD, digital download	11	35	79	13	163	—	14	8	19	UK: Gold; AFP: Gold
Smile	Released: October 13, 2017; Label: Soundwave; Format: CD, digital download	—	—	—	—	—	—	—	—	—	
"—" denotes releases that did not chart or were not released in that territory.

== Live albums ==
Title	Album details
Live	Released: 28 May 2007; Label: Innocent Records; Formats: CD, digital download

== Singles ==
=== As lead artist ===
List of singles, with selected chart positions
Title	Year	Peak chart positions										Album
Title	Year	UK	AUT	BEL	GER	IRE	ITA	NL	SPA	SCO	SWI	Album
"Lay Your Hands"	2005	4	48	36	48	21	2	94	9	6	51	Sanctuary
"No Worries"	2005	4	49	—	59	30	11	3	—	4	27	Sanctuary
"After All This Time"	2006	16	—	—	—	—	—	52	17	14	53	Sanctuary
"Coming Around Again"	2006	12	46	—	36	—	15	7	—	11	36	Grace
"My Soul Pleads for You"	2007	45	—	—	—	—	—	38	—	26	—	Grace
"Seventeen"	2007	—	—	—	100	—	—	—	—	—	—	Grace
"Grace / Ride the Storm"	2007	36	—	—	—	—	—	—	—	33	—	Grace
"Nothing Without You"	2017	—	—	—	—	—	—	—	—	—	—	Smile
"Flashback"	2017	—	—	—	—	—	—	—	—	—	—	Smile
"—" denotes releases that did not chart or were not released in that territory.

=== As featured artist ===
List of singles
Title	Year	Album
"Do You Right" (DeMarzo featuring Simon Webbe)	2014	Non-album single
"Casino Royal" (BATE featuring Simon Webbe)	2020	Non-album single
"—" denotes releases that did not chart or were not released in that territory.
