= Eliza Doolittle (disambiguation) =

Eliza Doolittle is a character from the play Pygmalion and My Fair Lady, a musical adaptation of the play.

Eliza Doolittle may also refer to:

- Eliza Doolittle (singer), English singer and songwriter
  - Eliza Doolittle (EP), an EP by Eliza Doolittle
  - Eliza Doolittle (album), an album by Eliza Doolittle
