= Big When I Was Little =

Single by Eliza Doolittle

from the album In Your Hands
- Released: 28 July 2013
- Recorded: 2012
- Label: Parlophone
- Songwriter(s): Eliza Doolittle; Wayne Hector; Steve Robson

Eliza Doolittle singles chronology
"You & Me" (2013)	"Big When I Was Little" (2013)	"The Hype" (2013)

"Big When I Was Little" is a song by British recording artist Eliza Doolittle. The song was released as a digital download in the United Kingdom on 28 July 2013 as the lead single from her second studio album, In Your Hands (2013). It joined BBC Radio 2's playlist in June.

It debuted at number 12 on the UK Singles Chart on 4 August 2013, making it her third solo UK top 40 hit following "Pack Up" and "Skinny Genes".

== Background ==
Talking about the song Doolittle said: "I was in the studio and I was rambling on about something saying 'that was big when I was little' and Steve goes 'that's a great song title!'" She also talked about the track's conception, saying: "So I wrote down some ideas and references and we wrote the song. It's the first song off of the new record and I can't wait for the whole album to be in your ears." On BBC Radio 1 Chart Show on 4 August 2013 she described the song as "nostalgic" and "looking back at her childhood".

== Live performances ==
On 28 July 2013 Doolittle performed the song live on British television series Sunday Brunch.

Doolittle performed the song on 4 October 2013 alongside Dionne Bromfield on CBBC show Friday Download.

== Critical reception ==
Lewis Corner of Digital Spy gave the song a positive review, describing it as:

"reminiscing of a time when cassettes were the music format of choice, Malcolm In The Middle was everyone's favourite tea time viewing and Posh Spice was still a popstar [...] as she daydreams over her trademark blend of jazzy brass and swaying melodies. [...] It's a charming celebration of hazy days past, but suffers from Eliza Doolittle barely moving forward.".

However Dan Johnson of The Bastard Lounge was less than complimentary, calling it an "infuriating throwback to The Days of Yore", "a warbling playground ditty" and "devoid of any form of meaning or emotion".

== Music video ==
A music video to accompany the release of "Big When I Was Little" was first released onto YouTube on 16 June 2013 at a total length of three minutes and fifty-nine seconds.

== Track listing ==
Digital download
No.	Title	Length
1.	"Big When I Was Little"	3:52
2.	"You and Me" (Piano Version)	4:00

== Charts ==
Chart (2013)	Peak position
Belgium (Ultratip Bubbling Under Flanders)	27
Scotland (OCC)	17
Slovakia (Rádio Top 100)	73
UK Singles (OCC)	12

== Release history ==
Region	Date	Format	Label
Belgium	21 June 2013	Digital download	Parlophone
United Kingdom	28 July 2013	Digital download	Parlophone
