= Seventeen (Simon Webbe song) =

Single by Simon Webbe

from the album Grace
- Released: 18 May 2007
- Recorded: 2006
- Genre: Pop
- Length: 3:22
- Label: Innocent Records
- Songwriter(s): Simon Webbe, Tim Woodcock, Matt Prime
- Producer(s): Tim Woodcock, Matt Prime

Simon Webbe singles chronology
"My Soul Pleads for You" (2007)	"Seventeen" (2007)	"Grace / Ride the Storm" (2007)

"Seventeen" is the third single released from Blue band-member Simon Webbe's second solo album, Grace. The track was only released in Germany where it peaked at number 100.

== Track listing ==
CD Single

1. "Seventeen" - 3:22
2. "Coming Around Again" (Live from Cannes) - 4:05
3. "No Worries" (Lovestar Remix) - 4:15
4. "Lay Your Hands" (StarGate Remix) - 4:11

== Charts ==
Chart (2007)	Peak position
Germany (GfK)	100
