= Hardware LDN =

Hardware LDN is a London-based and owned fashion house that specializes in high-end clothing, accessories and outerwear. Founded by Jessica Horwell in 2012. Spending time in both New York and Los Angeles as well as her home town of London has led to the Hardware LDN range being stocked in Selfridges.

== History ==
Jessica Horwell is a self-taught fashion designer who started by creating jewellery out of items found at hardware stores.

After a short stint as a stylist for the likes of Rihanna, Tinie Tempah and Eliza Doolittle, Jessica wanted to return to the more creative side of design and expand her collection from jewellery to clothes and other accessories and in doing so returned to her previous work for inspiration when naming the brand Hardware LDN.

== Influences ==
Horwell draws on a wide range of influences for her designs. Most notably these include London, NYC and L.A. She describes the brand as "bold, edgy, provocative, fun, London" and wants to "create a lifestyle brand with a strong identity".

Horwell has strong connections with the music industry through her styling and creative direction work. Hardware LDN has been seen on Artists such as Wiz Khalifa, Halsey, Wu-tang and Mac Miller, and in summer 2015 provided the clothing for all the backing dancers for Rita Ora's UK summer tour.
