= Grace (Simon Webbe album) =

Studio album by Simon Webbe
- Released: 13 November 2006
- Recorded: 2005–2006
- Genre: Pop; R&B
- Length: 45:32
- Label: EMI, Innocent
- Producer: Matt Prime, Steve DuBerry, Mushtaq, Wesley Johnson, Reed Vertelney

Simon Webbe chronology
| Sanctuary (2005) | Grace (2006) | Live (2007) |

Singles from Grace
- 1. "Coming Around Again" Released: 30 October 2006; 2. "My Soul Pleads for You" Released: 19 February 2007; 3. "Seventeen" Released: 18 May 2007; 4. "Grace / Ride the Storm" Released: 18 June 2007

Philippines special edition cover

Grace is the second studio album released by Blue band-member and singer-songwriter Simon Webbe. The album was released on 13 November 2006. After entering the UK Albums Chart at #40 based on downloads only, the album peaked at #11 upon its physical release. In Ireland, it failed to chart inside the Irish Top 100. The album was released to a similar lack of interest in Asia, South Africa and Australia. It sold considerably less than Webbe's first album, though managed to sell 100,000 copies in the UK, being certified Gold by the BPI. In certain Europe countries the album charted higher than his debut on first week however spent less time on the charts overall and in sales.

A special edition of the album was released on 14 August 2007, containing four extra tracks. The special edition includes "Ride The Storm", the lead single from the film Fantastic Four: Rise of the Silver Surfer. Four singles were released from the album: "Coming Around Again" (which peaked at #12 on the UK Singles Chart), "My Soul Pleads for You" (which peaked at #45 on the UK Singles Chart), "Seventeen" (which peaked at #171 on the UK Singles Chart, based on downloads only), and "Grace"/"Ride the Storm" (which peaked at #36 on the UK Singles Chart).

== Track listings ==
| No. | Title | Writer(s) | Producer(s) | Length |
|---|---|---|---|---|
| 1. | "Coming Around Again" | Simon Webbe, Matt Prime, Tim Woodcock | Prime, Woodcock | 3:44 |
| 2. | "Seventeen" | Webbe, Prime, Woodcock | Prime, Woodcock | 3:22 |
| 3. | "Sunshine (Love Like That)" | Webbe, Prime, Woodcock | Prime, Woodcock | 4:01 |
| 4. | "Go to Sleep" | Prime, Woodcock | Prime, Woodcock | 3:30 |
| 5. | "Ain't True to Yourself" | Webbe, Prime, Woodcock | Prime, Woodcock | 3:18 |
| 6. | "Don't Wanna Be That Man" | Webbe, Prime, Woodcock | Prime, Woodcock | 3:58 |
| 7. | "Angel (My Life Began With You)" | Webbe, Steve DuBerry | DuBerry | 4:00 |
| 8. | "Fool for You" | Webbe, DuBerry | DuBerry | 4:14 |
| 9. | "My Soul Pleads for You" | Wessley Johnson, Clinton Outten | Johnson | 3:49 |
| 10. | "That's the Way it Goes" | Johnson, Gary Benson | Johnson | 4:45 |
| 11. | "Take Your Time" | Webbe, Mushtaq, Thomas Jules-Stock | Mushtaq | 3:19 |
| 12. | "Grace" | Webbe, Prime, Woodcock | Prime, Woodcock | 3:25 |

Japanese edition bonus tracks
| No. | Title | Writer(s) | Producer(s) | Length |
|---|---|---|---|---|
| 13. | "Rain" | Webbe ~ Reed Vertelney | Vertelney | 3:52 |
| 14. | "Whatever Gets You Through the Night" | Webbe ~ Prime ~ Woodcock | Prime | 4:00 |

Philippines special edition bonus tracks
| No. | Title | Writer(s) | Producer(s) | Length |
|---|---|---|---|---|
| 13. | "Lay Your Hands" | Webbe ~ Prime ~ Woodcock | Prime | 4:28 |
| 14. | "No Worries" | Webbe ~ Prime ~ Woodcock | Prime | 3:29 |
| 15. | "After All This Time" | Webbe ~ Prime ~ Woodcock | Prime | 3:36 |
| 16. | "Ride The Storm" | Webbe ~ Alex Reid | Reid ~ James Lewis | 3:41 |

== Charts ==
Weekly chart performance for Grace
| Chart (2006) | Peak position |
|---|---|
| Austrian Albums (Ö3 Austria) | 35 |
| Belgian Albums (Ultratop Flanders) | 79 |
| Dutch Albums (Album Top 100) | 14 |
| German Albums (Offizielle Top 100) | 13 |
| Italian Albums (FIMI) | 58 |
| Japanese Albums (Oricon) | 163 |
| Portuguese Albums (AFP) | 8 |
| Scottish Albums (OCC) | 29 |
| Swiss Albums (Schweizer Hitparade) | 19 |
| UK Albums (OCC) | 11 |

== Certifications ==
Certifications of Grace
| Region | Certification | Certified units/sales |
|---|---|---|
| Portugal (AFP) | Gold | 10,000^{^} |
| United Kingdom (BPI) | Gold | 100,000^{^} |
^{^} Shipments figures based on certification alone.
