= Redemption Day =

Redemption Day may refer to:

- "Redemption Day", a song by Sheryl Crow recorded for:
  - Sheryl Crow (album), 1996
  - Threads (Sheryl Crow album), 2019
  - American VI: Ain't No Grave, a 2010 posthumous album by Johnny Cash
- "Redemption Day", an episode of the documentary series Deadliest Catch
- "Redemption Days", a song by Josh Osho from the 2011 album L.I.F.E
- Redemption Day (film), a 2021 American action film

== See also ==
- Day of Redemption (disambiguation)
