= L.i.f.e =

Studio album by Josh Osho
- Released: 2012
- Genre: Pop rock
- Length: 53:57
- Label: Island Records

L.i.f.e is Josh Osho's first album. It reached #88 on the UK Albums Chart.

== Track listing ==
All songs written by Josh Osho, Matt Prime and Tim Woodcock, with assistance from others on some tracks.

No.	Title	Writer(s)	Length
1.	"Redemption Days"		3:52
2.	"Giants"		3:58
3.	"Footsteps"		3:19
4.	"Imperfections"		4:01
5.	"TMAIA"	Lukas Burton	4:02
6.	"Freewheel"		3:36
7.	"Ebenezer Hotel"		4:11
8.	"S.O.S."		3:37
9.	"Homeboy"		3:54
10.	"Wishing Well"		3:31
11.	"Highlight of My Day"		3:34
12.	"Home for Your Birthday"		4:12
13.	"Redemption Days ft. Ghostface Killah"		4:32
14.	"Giants ft. Childish Gambino"	Donald Glover	3:38
Total length:			53:57
