= Lloyd Wade =

British singer

Lloyd Wade is an English gospel and soul singer and pop vocal coach from South London. He achieved some fame in the UK Christian music scene performing with his brothers Denis, Derek and David in the group the Wades in the 1990s, including a set at Champion of the World in Wembley Stadium in 1997.

He was working as a vocal coach and teacher of social behaviour in an inclusion (education) department when he appeared as a contestant in the first series of The X Factor, and made the top 5 contestant of the "over 25" category, which was mentored by Simon Cowell.

== Early life and career ==
Wade learned his trade in gospel music singing with his brothers in the MOBO nominated group The Wades for 18 years. The Wades toured extensively across Europe and Australia during the nineties, playing at many notable venues such as The Royal Festival Hall, Wembley Arena, Wembley Stadium and the Sydney, Melbourne and Brisbane Entertainment Centres. Their largest single festival audience was at the Chicago Gospel Festival in Grant Park where they performed live to some 100,000 festival goers, as well as many radio and television appearances throughout their career.

Wade attended regular vocal classes throughout his early development as a singer and in 1991 he became a vocal coach. Wade has worked closely with the BBC Fame Academy judges David and Carrie Grant for their vocal session company both as a session singer and as an associate vocal coach. Wade has been instrumental in helping to shape the vocal prowess of many people over the last 18 years such as Daniel Bedingfield and Natasha Bedingfield in their formative years leading up to their career and subsequent chart success. 2010 - Wade sings the main hook on singer Eliza Doolittle's top ten single "Pack Up" which peaked at #5 in the British pop chart behind entries from Kylie Minogue and Eminem.

In 2007 Wade was guest vocalist with Take That on their Beautiful World Tour 2007, duetting with them on "Relight My Fire", singing a mixture of the Gnarls Barkley song "Crazy" and the part sung on the single version of "Relight My Fire" by Lulu.

He was a support vocalist Simon Webbe's song "Coming Around Again". He was a vocalist for the BBC Tsunami appeal song. Wade worked with Robert Palmer as a backing singer on his TV appearances, which included an appearance on Later... with Jools Holland and Palmer's 35 state tour of America in the fall of 1999.Wade coached Howard Donald of Take That in 2008. In 2009 Wade coached Jess Stickley of Girls Can't Catch.In 2010 he was a joint vocalist on the One Voice appeal song for the 2010 Haiti earthquake, "Somebody Please".

Wade enjoyed top 5 chart success dueting with Eliza Doolittle on her hit single Pack Up and has appeared with her on TV and radio shows across Europe throughout 2010 and 2011.

Wade Provided singers for the background vocal choirs for X factor in Series 4 and 5,(2007/2008) and on series 8 (2011) he joined the X factor vocal coaching team as an associate vocal coach working with the judges, Gary Barlow, Louis Walsh, Kelly Rowland, and Tulisa Contostavlos.

Series finalists he worked with were little mix, Marcus Collins, Amelia Lilly, Frankie Cocozza, Craig Colton, James Michael, Misha B, Janet Devlin, Sophie Habibis, Jonny Robinson, Sami Brookes, Kitty Brucknell, Jonjo Kerr, Jo Robinson, 2 shoes, Nu vibe, The Risk.

In 2013, Wade, along with a band named Band of Voices, auditioned for the 7th series of Cowell's other talent show Britain's Got Talent, Cowell recognised him. Band of Voices were put through to the semi-finals and performed on the first live show, despite gaining a large fanbase from the audition, the group were eliminated later that night through the public vote.

In February 2017, it was announced that Wade would star in Soul Town at Butlins Holiday Resorts, the show will last from February till December 2017.

== Notable television appearances ==
=== The X Factor ===
In 2004, Wade successfully auditioned for the first series of The X Factor, he made it through to the judges houses stage of the competition, and was placed in the over 25s category, his potential mentor Simon Cowell did not send him through to the live shows and he was therefore eliminated. Simon later lamented to Lloyd's manager that he regretted not sending Lloyd through.

=== Britain's Got Talent ===
In 2013, Wade, along with a band named Band of Voices, auditioned for the seventh series of Cowell's other talent show Britain's Got Talent, Cowell recognised him. Band of Voices were put through to the semi-finals and performed on the first live show, despite gaining a large fanbase from the audition, the group were eliminated later that night through the public vote.
