= Dance on My Own =

Dance on My Own may refer to:

- "Dance on My Own" (M.O song), 2014 song by English recording trio M.O
- "Dance on My Own" (Loona song), 2021 song by South Korean girl group Loona
- "Dance on My Own" (Simon Webbe song), 2017 song by English singer Simon Webbe
- "Dancing on My Own", 2010 song by Swedish singer-songwriter Robyn
