= Live (Simon Webbe album) =

Live album by Simon Webbe
- Released: 28 May 2007 (UK)
- Recorded: 27 May 2007
- Genres: Pop; R&B
- Length: 99:00
- Label: Innocent / Concert Live
- Producer: Concert Live

Simon Webbe chronology
Grace (2006)	Live (2007)	Smile (2017)

Live is a live performance album released by former Blue band-member and singer-songwriter Simon Webbe, made available on May 28, 2007, exclusively via the Concert Live website. The album was recorded live at the National Indoor Arena in Birmingham. The album was also made available to download straight after the concert performance. The album contains a variety of tracks, covering his entire career, including tracks from his time with Blue, both his solo albums, and covers of other artists, such as The Rolling Stones, Oasis, The Killers and Muse, as well as new tracks pencilled to be included on his upcoming third studio album.

== Track listing ==
Disc 1
No.	Title	Writer(s)	Producer(s)	Length
1.	"Sanctuary"	Webbe, Matt Prime, Tim Woodcock	Matt Prime	4:03
2.	"Ashamed"	Webbe, Matt Prime, Tim Woodcock	Matt Prime	3:33
3.	"Don't Wanna Be That Man"	Webbe, Matt Prime, Tim Woodcock	Matt Prime	3:58
4.	"After All This Time"	Webbe, Matt Prime, Tim Woodcock	Matt Prime	3:48
5.	"Free"	Webbe, Matt Prime, Tim Woodcock	Matt Prime	3:10
6.	"A Little High"	Webbe, Matt Prime, Tim Woodcock	Matt Prime	3:47
7.	"Lay Your Hands"	Webbe, Matt Prime, Tim Woodcock	Matt Prime	4:28
8.	"Ready or Not"	Jean, Michel, Hill, Hart, Bell, Enya, Ryan, Ryan	Matt Prime	3:48
9.	"I Don't Wanna Know"	Winans, Enya, Ryan, Ryan, Down, Hawkins	Matt Prime	4:18
10.	"All About You"	Keith Richards, Mick Jagger	Matt Prime	4:18
11.	"Wonderwall"	Noel Gallagher	Matt Prime	4:18
12.	"Run"	Webbe, Steve Duberry	Steve Duberry	4:09
13.	"All I Want"	Webbe, Matt Prime, Tim Woodcock	Matt Prime	3:44

Disc 2
No.	Title	Writer(s)	Producer(s)	Length
1.	"My Soul Pleads For You"	Wesley Johnson, Clinton Outten	Clinton Outten	3:49
2.	"That's The Way It Goes"	Wesley Johnson, John Benson	John Benson	4:45
3.	"When You Were Young"	Brandon Flowers, Keuning, Stoermer, Vannucci	Matt Prime	3:38
4.	"Supermassive Black Hole"	Matt Bellamy	Matt Prime	3:29
5.	"Fly Away"	Webbe, Steve Duberry	Steve Duberry	3:08
6.	"Blue Medley"	Webbe, Costa, James, Ryan, Barlow, Kennedy, Eriksen, Hermansen, Rustan	Stargate, Eliot Kennedy	7:02
7.	"Grace"	Webbe, Matt Prime, Tim Woodcock	Matt Prime	3:25
8.	"Seventeen"	Webbe, Matt Prime, Tim Woodcock	Matt Prime	3:22
9.	"Coming Around Again"	Webbe, Matt Prime, Tim Woodcock	Matt Prime	3:44
10.	"Ride the Storm"	Webbe, Alex Reid	Alex Reid, James Lewis	3:41
11.	"No Worries"	Webbe, Matt Prime, Tim Woodcock	Matt Prime	3:29
12.	"Grace" (Live from Cannes)	Webbe, Matt Prime, Tim Woodcock	Matt Prime	3:25

== Release history ==
Region	Date	Label	Format
United Kingdom	May 27, 2007	Innocent Records, Concert Live	Digital download
United Kingdom	May 28, 2007	Innocent Records, Concert Live	2xCD
