= All Love Everything =

Studio album by Aloe Blacc
- Released: October 2, 2020
- Studio: Big Noize (Hollywood Hills); Mambo (SoHo); The Synagogue (Los Angeles); Sancola (Toluca Lake)
- Label: BMG
- Producer: Jonas Jeberg; Jugglerz; Jon Levine; Matt Prime

Aloe Blacc chronology
| Christmas Funk (2018) | All Love Everything (2020) |

Singles from All Love Everything
- 1. "I Do" Released: February 14, 2020; 2. "My Way" Released: June 25, 2020; 3. "Hold On Tight" Released: September 4, 2020; 4. "I Do (with LeAnn Rimes)" Released: February 12, 2021

All Love Everything is the fifth studio album by American musician Aloe Blacc. The album was released on October 2, 2020, through BMG. The album includes the singles "I Do", "My Way", and "Hold On Tight".

== Background ==
In an interview with Spin, Blacc said, "All Love Everything is about togetherness, it's about family and my personal relationships, which obviously have further developed with COVID. Every weekend I do family Zooms, I'm with my kids pretty much 24/7 and my wife so togetherness really is a true theme when it comes to my life. No one would have predicted that but this is where we are and I'm glad that I'm still releasing the album whereas other artists might be holding back but in my mind, this is the perfect messaging for right now. I hope these songs give people an opportunity to reflect on the people in their lives that are close to them. A song like 'Glory Days' is a song about making today and every day your glory days rather than looking back longingly or nostalgically at the past. Then there's a song called 'My Family' which is another opportunity for people to look at their mom, their kids, their parents, their significant other more closely and just give them a song to sing about them." A deluxe edition was released on March 12, 2021.

== Singles ==
"I Do" was released as the lead single from the album on February 14, 2020. "My Way" was released as the second single from the album on June 25, 2020. "Hold On Tight" was released as the third single from the album on September 4, 2020. "I Do" was released as a single again, this time as a duet with country-pop-rock singer, LeAnn Rimes, on February 12, 2021 for the release of the deluxe edition of the album.

== Track listing ==
All Love Everything track listing
| No. | Title | Writer(s) | Producer(s) | Length |
|---|---|---|---|---|
| 1. | "Family" | Aloe Blacc; Jonas Jeberg; Neil Ormandy | Jeberg; Abe Dertner^{[a]} | 3:07 |
| 2. | "All Love Everything" | Blacc; Jeberg; Ormandy | Jeberg; Dertner^{[a]} | 2:27 |
| 3. | "My Way" | Blacc; Jeberg; Matt Prime; Ormandy | Jeberg; Prime^{[c]} | 3:30 |
| 4. | "Wherever You Go" | Blacc; Jordan Palmer; Andrea Rosario; Jonathan Simpson; Jay Stolar | Jeberg; Dertner^{[a]} | 3:03 |
| 5. | "Nothing Left but You" | Blacc; Kyle Kelso; Stolar | Jugglerz; Kelso^{[c]} | 3:10 |
| 6. | "Glory Days" | Blacc; Jeberg; Ormandy | Jeberg; Dertner^{[a]} | 2:59 |
| 7. | "I Do" | Blacc; Jon Levine; Sarah Solovay; Stolar | Levine; Stolar^{[v]} | 3:37 |
| 8. | "Corner" | Blacc; Sean Douglas; Prime | Prime | 3:19 |
| 9. | "Hold On Tight" | Blacc; Jeberg; Ormandy; Steve Solomon | Jeberg; Solomon^{[a]} | 3:48 |
| 10. | "Harvard" | Blacc; Sam Hollander; Jeberg; Grant Michaels | Jeberg; Dertner^{[a]} | 3:54 |

All Love Everything Target exclusive track listing
| No. | Title | Writer(s) | Producer(s) | Length |
|---|---|---|---|---|
| 11. | "Other Side" | Blacc; Tim Myers | Myers | 4:17 |
| 12. | "Missing Piece" | Blacc; Justin Jesso; Sermstyle | Sermstyle | 3:16 |

All Love Everything deluxe edition track listing
| No. | Title | Writer(s) | Producer(s) | Length |
|---|---|---|---|---|
| 11. | "I Do" (with LeAnn Rimes) | Blacc; Levine; Solovay; Stolar | Blacc; Darrell Brown; Rimes | 3:10 |
| 12. | "Other Side" | Blacc; Myers | Myers | 4:17 |
| 13. | "Missing Piece" | Blacc; Jesso; Sermstyle | Sermstyle | 3:16 |

Notes

- ^{^[p]} signifies a primary and vocal producer.
- ^{^[c]} signifies a co-producer.
- ^{^[a]} signifies an additional producer.

== Personnel ==
Credits based on the deluxe edition track listing.

Musicians

- Aloe Blacc – lead vocals, backing vocals (all tracks); choir (track 3)
- Jonas Jeberg – live drums, percussion (tracks 1–4, 6, 9); organ (1, 3, 9), piano (1), bass guitar (2, 3), glockenspiel (2, 6, 9, 10), Mellotron (2, 6, 10), Wurlitzer (2, 6), wah-wah (2); electric guitar, choir (3); string arrangement (4), clavinet (6), vibraphone (9), strings (10)
- Abe Dertner – electric guitar, organ (tracks 1, 2, 4, 6, 9); bass guitar (1, 2, 9), Wurlitzer (2, 6), piano (4, 9), string arrangement (4), acoustic guitar (9, 10); Mellotron, live strings (10)
- Mikkel Risum – bass guitar (track 3)
- Caroline Dale – cello (track 3)
- Chris Worsey – cello (track 3)
- Nick Cooper – cello (track 3)
- Anjolee Williams – choir (tracks 3, 4, 9)
- Charles Henderson-McCracy – choir (tracks 3, 4, 9)
- Leah van King – choir (tracks 3, 9)
- Neil Ormandy – choir (track 3)
- Ryan McDaniel – choir (tracks 3, 9)
- Mary Scully – double bass (track 3)
- Matt Prime – piano (tracks 3, 8), string arrangement (3), programming (8)
- Wil Malone – string arrangement (track 3)
- Bruce White – viola (track 3)
- Peter Lale – viola (track 3)
- Rachel Bolt – viola (track 3)
- Everton Nelson – violin leader (track 3)
- Steve Morris – second violin leader (track 3)
- Cathy Thompson – violin (track 3)
- Chris Tombling – violin (track 3)
- Debbie Widdup – violin (track 3)
- Ian Humphries – violin (track 3)
- Mark Berrow – violin (track 3)
- Miranda Dale – violin (track 3)
- Oli Langford – violin (track 3)
- Roger Garland – violin (track 3)
- Oliver McCewan – bass guitar (tracks 4, 6)
- Rocio Marron – viola, violin (tracks 4, 11)
- Kyle Kelso – programming (track 5)
- Jesse McGinty – baritone saxophone, tenor saxophone (track 6)
- Mike Cordone – trumpet (track 6)
- Jon Levine – keyboards (tracks 7, 11); bass guitar, drums, programming, piano (track 7)
- Kenneth Crouch – keyboards (track 11)
- LeAnn Rimes – vocals (track 11)
- Tim Myers – bass guitar, drums, electric guitar, keyboards, programming (track 12)

Technical

- Dale Becker – mastering (tracks 1–4, 6, 8–10)
- Midi Jones – mastering, engineering (track 7)
- Emily Lazar – mastering (track 11)
- Tim Myers – mastering, mixing (track 12)
- Jeremiah Glazer – mastering, mixing (track 13)
- Serge Courtois – mixing (tracks 1–4, 6, 8–10)
- Jugglerz – mixing (track 5)
- Jon Levine – mixing (track 7)
- Jonas Jeberg – engineering (tracks 1–4, 6, 9, 10)
- Kyle Kelso – engineering (track 5)
- Matt Prime – engineering (track 8)

Visuals

- Farmer Greif – artwork
- Marina Piche – creative direction
- Amanda Austin – photography
- Zach Bell – photography

== Charts ==
| Chart (2020) | Peak position |
|---|---|
| French Albums (SNEP) | 154 |
| German Albums (Offizielle Top 100) | 66 |
| Swiss Albums (Schweizer Hitparade) | 51 |

== Release history ==
| Region | Date | Format | Edition(s) | Label |
|---|---|---|---|---|
| Various | October 2, 2020 | Digital download; streaming; CD | Standard | BMG |
| Various | March 12, 2021 | Digital download; streaming | Deluxe | BMG |
