= In Your Hands (album) =

Studio album by Eliza Doolittle
- Released: 14 October 2013
- Genre: Indie pop; pop; soul
- Length: 46:43
- Label: Parlophone
- Producer: Busbee; Kid Harpoon; Wayne Hector; Kwes; Matt Prime; Steve Robson; Oren Yoel

Eliza Doolittle chronology
Eliza Doolittle (2010)	In Your Hands (2013)	Christmas (2013)

Singles from In Your Hands
- 1. "Big When I Was Little" Released: 28 July 2013; 2. "Waste of Time" Released: 15 August 2013; 3. "Let It Rain" Released: 11 October 2013; 4. "Walking On Water" Released: 26 November 2013

In Your Hands is the second studio album by British singer Eliza Doolittle. It was released by Parlophone on 14 October 2013 in the United Kingdom. The album peaked at number 25 on the UK Albums Chart and number 71 on the Irish Albums Chart.

== Critical reception ==
Professional ratings
Review scores
Source	Rating
AllMusic	3.5/5 stars
Digital Spy	(mixed)
Renowned for Sound	(mixed)

AllMusic editor Matt Collar found that the album "goes far toward moving her in a more grown-up direction. Working with a handful of writer/producers, In Your Hands is a sophisticated, contemporary dance and soul album that takes its cues from the sound and style of '90s R&B stars like Mariah Carey and En Vogue [...] Ultimately, the focus on In Your Hands is less on Doolittle's cheeky persona and more on her passionate lyrics and warm vocals, a change she can back up with her creativity and talent." Robert Copsey of Digital Spy called In Your Hands a "coming of age record" that is "a recollection of experiences that come with being in a serious relationship." He felt that "all too often [Doolittle] slips into MOR soul-pop, adding little new – musically or otherwise – to the table. It seems in an effort to be taken seriously, Eliza has forgotten to have any fun." Renowned for Sound critic Francesca Tichon remarked that "though people have compared her to Lily Allen, and her soulful voice does conjure memories of Amy Winehouse, Doolittle falls far short of these two musical icons. Her sound is a fairly generic UK pop sound, and though In Your Hands is a fun album with relatable story lines (and certainly a vast improvement on her debut), it’s really nothing special."

== Commercial performance ==
On 16 October 2013, the album debuted at number 23 on The Official Chart Update. A day later, In Your Hands entered the Irish Albums Chart at number 71. On 20 October 2013, the album entered the UK Albums Chart at number 25.

== Track listing ==
Standard edition
No.	Title	Writer(s)	Producer(s)	Length
1.	"Waste of Time"	Eliza Caird; Steve Robson; Wayne Hector	Robson	2:58
2.	"Back Packing"	Caird; Kid Harpoon	Harpoon	3:34
3.	"Hush"	Caird; Oren Yoel	Yoel	3:38
4.	"Let It Rain"	Caird; Yoel; Ross Golan; Robson	Robson; Yoel	3:47
5.	"No Man Can"	Caird; Yoel	Yoel	4:12
6.	"Walking On Water"	Caird; Harpoon	Harpoon	3:22
7.	"In Your Hands"	Caird; busbee	busbee	3:31
8.	"Checkmate"	Caird; Robson; Hector	Robson	3:19
9.	"Team Player"	Caird; Yoel	Yoel	4:06
10.	"Make Up Sex"	Caird; Matt Prime; Tim Woodcock	Prime	3:41
11.	"Don't Call It Love"	Caird; Kwes	Kwes	3:33
12.	"Big When I Was Little"	Caird; Robson; Hector	Robson	3:49
13.	"Euston Road"	Caird; Robson; Hector	Robson; Hector	3:13
Total length:				46:43

Deluxe edition
No.	Title	Length
14.	"Missing Kissing"	3:37
15.	"One in a Bed"	3:54
16.	"Rubbish Cans"	3:22
Total length:		56:36

== Charts ==
Chart (2013)	Peak position
Australian Hitseekers Albums (ARIA)	14
Belgian Albums (Ultratop Flanders)	111
Irish Albums (IRMA)	71
Scottish Albums (OCC)	37
UK Albums (OCC)	25
UK Album Downloads (OCC)	29

== Release history ==
List of release dates, showing region, formats, label, and reference
Region	Date	Format(s)	Label	Ref.
United Kingdom	14 October 2013	Digital download; CD	Parlophone	
