= Satellites (The Script album) =

2024 album by the Script

Studio album by The Script
- Released: 16 August 2024
- Genres: Pop; rock
- Length: 35:12
- Label: BMG
- Producers: Iain Archer; Jimbo Barry; Steve Mac; Danny O'Donoghue; Matt Prime; Steve Robson

The Script chronology
Sunsets & Full Moons (2019)	Satellites (2024)	The User's Guide to Being Human (2026)

Singles from Satellites
- 1. "Both Ways" Released: 17 May 2024; 2. "At Your Feet" Released: 19 July 2024; 3. "Inside Out" Released: 7 March 2025

Professional ratings
Review scores
Source	Rating
Buzz Magazine	3/5
i	3/5 stars
The Irish Times	3/5 stars

Satellites is the seventh studio album by Irish pop rock group The Script, released on 16 August 2024 through BMG Rights Management. It is their first album released by the band after Mark Sheehan's death in April 2023 from a brief illness, and it is also their first album to feature their bassist Benjamin Sargent who joined the band in May 2024, while lead guitarist Ben Weaver joined the band shortly after the recording has been completed. To date, Satellites is the Script's last studio album to be recorded as a trio.

Three singles were released from the album: "Both Ways" on 17 May 2024, "At Your Feet" on 19 July 2024 and "Inside Out" on 7 March 2025. The album was debuted at number one on the Irish Albums Chart and at number two on the UK Albums Chart.

To promote the album, the band embarked on the Satellites World Tour from 2024 to 2025. The tour began in the United States, where they were an opening act for Pink alongside Gayle, KidCutUp, and Sheryl Crow on her Summer Carnival Tour, and also travelled through Europe, Australia and Asia.

== Track listing ==
Satellites track listing
No.	Title	Writer(s)	Producer(s)	Length
1.	"Both Ways"	Danny O'Donoghue; Glen Power; Steve Robson; Wayne Hector	Steve Robson	3:07
2.	"Unsaid"	O'Donoghue; Josh Gray; James Barry; Conor Byrne	O'Donoghue; Jimbo Barry	2:07
3.	"Home Is Where The Hurt Is"	O'Donoghue; Matt Prime; Hector	Matt Prime	2:41
4.	"At Your Feet"	O'Donoghue; Robson; Hector	Robson	3:26
5.	"Gone"	O'Donoghue; Robson; Nolan Winfield Sipe; Barry	Robson	2:20
6.	"Inside Out"	O'Donoghue; Steve Mac	Mac	3:29
7.	"Satellites"	O'Donoghue; Mark Sheehan; Benjamin Francis Leftwich; Iain Archer	O'Donoghue; Archer	3:21
8.	"One Thing I Got Right"	O'Donoghue; Archer; Ben Sargeant	O'Donoghue; Archer; Barry^{[c]}	3:00
9.	"Falling Flying"	O'Donoghue; Archer	O'Donoghue; Archer	3:16
10.	"Before You Go"	O'Donoghue; Power	O'Donoghue; Archer	3:01
11.	"Promises"	O'Donoghue; Barry; Hector	O'Donoghue; Barry	3:22
12.	"Run Run Run"	O'Donoghue; Barry; Sipe	O'Donoghue; Barry	2:42
Total length:				35:12

Note

- ^{^[c]} signifies a co-producer

== Personnel ==
The Script

- Danny O'Donoghue – lead vocals (all tracks), backing vocals (tracks 2, 7, 8, 10), acoustic guitar (4), guitar (1, 4, 6, 12), bass (7, 9), harpsichord (8)
- Glen Power – drums (tracks 1, 3, 4, 5, 6, 10, 12), backing vocals (1, 3, 4, 10, 12), guitar (6, 10), bouzouki (6)
- Benjamin Sargeant – bass (tracks 1, 2, 4, 6, 8, 10, 11, 12), backing vocals (6, 12)

Additional musicians

- Steve Robson – keyboards (tracks 1, 4, 5), drum programming (1), programming (4, 5)
- Wayne Hector – backing vocals (tracks 1, 4)
- Nick Tsang – guitar (tracks 1, 4, 5)
- Jimbo Barry – programming (tracks 2, 11, 12), keyboards (11, 12)
- Josh Gray – backing vocals (tracks 2, 12)
- Rich Norman – bass (track 3)
- Matt Prime – guitar (track 3)
- Clash – additional backing vocals (track 5)
- Chris Laws – drum programming (track 6)
- John Parricelli – guitar (track 6)
- Iain Archer – drum programming, keyboards (tracks 7–10); percussion (7–9)
- Benjamin Francis Leftwich – acoustic guitar (track 7)
- Dan Griffin – guitar (tracks 10)
- Nolan Sipe – backing vocals (track 12)

Technical

- John Greenham – mastering
- Mark "Spike" Stent – mixing (tracks 1–7)
- Guy Massey – mixing (tracks 8–12)
- Sam Miller – engineering (tracks 1, 4, 5)
- Dan Griffin – engineering (tracks 2–5, 7, 8, 10–12)
- Matt Prime – engineering (track 3)
- Chris Laws – engineering (track 6)
- Daniel Pursey – engineering (track 6)
- Iain Archer – engineering (tracks 7–10), string arrangement (7)

Visuals

- Anais Naing – cover photo
- Peter Neill – cover photo
- Jordan Rossi – inside photos
- Gary Kelly – artwork, design

== Charts ==
Chart performance for Satellites
Chart (2024)	Peak position
Belgian Albums (Ultratop Flanders)	25
Dutch Albums (Album Top 100)	9
German Albums (Offizielle Top 100)	91
Irish Albums (Official Charts)	1
Scottish Albums (Official Charts)	2
Swiss Albums (Schweizer Hitparade)	67
UK Albums (Official Charts)	2
UK Independent Albums (Official Charts)	1
