= Let It Rain (Eliza Doolittle song) =

Single by Eliza Doolittle

from the album In Your Hands
- Released: 11 October 2013
- Recorded: 2012
- Genre: Pop
- Length: 3:47
- Label: Parlophone
- Songwriter(s): Eliza Doolittle, Ross Golan, Oren Kleinman, Steve Robson

Eliza Doolittle singles chronology
"The Hype" (2013)	"Let It Rain" (2013)	"Wide Eyed Fool" (2017)

"Let It Rain" is a song by British recording artist Eliza Doolittle. The song was released as a digital download in the United Kingdom on 11 October 2013 as the second single from her second studio album, In Your Hands (2013). The song has peaked to number 55 on the UK Singles Chart.

== Music video ==
A music video to accompany the release of "Let It Rain" was first released onto YouTube on 1 September 2013 at a total length of four minutes and twenty-one seconds.

== Track listing ==
Digital download
No.	Title	Length
1.	"Let It Rain"	3:47

== Chart performance ==
=== Weekly charts ===
Chart (2013)	Peak position
UK Singles (Official Charts Company)	55

== Release history ==
Region	Date	Format	Label
United Kingdom	11 October 2013	Digital download	Parlophone
