= Day of Redemption =

Day of Redemption may refer to:

- Ephesians 4:30 ("And grieve not the holy Spirit of God, whereby ye are sealed unto the day of redemption." KJV)
- Day of Redemption (film), 2013

== See also ==
- Redemption Day (disambiguation)
