= You & Me (Disclosure song) =

Single by Disclosure featuring Eliza Doolittle

from the album Settle
- Released: 28 April 2013
- Recorded: 2012
- Genre: UK garage; 2-step garage
- Length: 4:56 (single version); 4:29 (album version); 3:42 (radio edit)
- Label: Island
- Songwriters: Howard Lawrence; Guy Lawrence; James Napier; Eliza Caird
- Producer: Disclosure

Disclosure singles chronology
"White Noise" (2013)	"You & Me" (2013)	"F for You" (2013)

Eliza Doolittle singles chronology
"Mr Medicine" (2011)	"You & Me" (2013)	"Big When I Was Little" (2013)

Music video
- "You & Me" on YouTube

"You & Me" is a song by British electronic music duo Disclosure, featuring vocals from Eliza Doolittle. It was released as a digital download in the United Kingdom on 28 April 2013. The track is the third single from the duo's debut studio album, Settle (2013). The song was written by Howard Lawrence, Guy Lawrence, James Napier, and Eliza Caird, and was produced by Disclosure. It has gained popularity through the Flume and Rivo remix.

== Music video ==
=== Background ===
A music video to accompany the release of "You & Me" was first released onto YouTube on 25 April 2013 at a total length of four minutes and 14 seconds.

=== Synopsis ===
The video shows a young couple (played by professional English freerunner and traceur Tim Shieff, and Lauren Johns who also appeared on Delilah's music video "Breathe") travelling across Europe, including Croatia, and dancing at a Disclosure show. It also shows a poster on a wall, on the poster it says "Album coming soon". The video also shows Tim doing various Parkour moves, including running, climbing, vaulting and jumping. Eliza Doolittle does not appear in the music video while Disclosure makes a cameo at the concert.

== Critical reception ==
Lewis Corner of Digital Spy gave the song a positive review.

In September 2019, NME included the song in their "25 essential UK garage anthems" list.

== Track listings ==
Digital download
No.	Title	Length
1.	"You & Me" (featuring Eliza Doolittle)	4:56

Remixes
No.	Title	Length
1.	"You & Me" (Baauer remix) (featuring Eliza Doolittle)	4:03
2.	"You & Me" (Toro y Moi remix) (featuring Eliza Doolittle)	4:53
3.	"You & Me" (Flume remix) (featuring Eliza Doolittle)	4:43
4.	"You & Me" (Meute remix)	5:06

== Credits and personnel ==
- Lead vocals – Eliza Doolittle
- Producers – Disclosure
- Lyrics – Howard Lawrence, Guy Lawrence, James Napier, Eliza Caird
- Label: Island

== Chart performance ==
On 5 May 2013, the song entered at number 10 on the UK Singles Chart for the week ending 11 May 2013. It also entered at number six on the UK Dance Chart, number 27 on the Scottish Singles Chart and has also charted in Belgium.

=== Weekly charts ===
Weekly chart performance for "You & Me"
Chart (2013–2024)	Peak position
Austria (Ö3 Austria Top 40)	62
Belgium (Ultratip Bubbling Under Flanders)	7
Belgium (Ultratop 50 Wallonia)	41
France (SNEP)	2
Germany (GfK)	88
Greece International (IFPI)	11
Ireland (IRMA)	66
Netherlands (Single Top 100)	59
Portugal (AFP)	46
Scottish Singles Sales (Official Charts)	27
Slovakia Airplay (ČNS IFPI)	82
Spain (Promusicae)	30
Switzerland (Schweizer Hitparade)	27
UK Singles (Official Charts)	10
UK Dance (Official Charts)	6
Ukraine Airplay (TopHit)	51
US Hot Dance/Electronic Songs (Billboard)	19

Weekly chart performance for "You & Me (Flume Remix)"
Chart (2013)	Peak position
UK Dance (Official Charts)	17
UK Singles (Official Charts)	49

Weekly chart performance for "You & Me (Rivo Remix)"
Chart (2026)	Peak position
Greece International (IFPI)	23

=== Monthly charts ===
Monthly chart performance for "You & Me"
Chart (2024)	Peak position
Ukraine Airplay (TopHit)	90

=== Year-end charts ===
2013 year-end chart performance for "You & Me"
Chart (2013)	Position
UK Singles (Official Charts Company)	100

2014 year-end chart performance for "You & Me"
Chart (2014)	Position
France (SNEP)	10
US Hot Dance/Electronic Songs (Billboard)	54

2015 year-end chart performance for "You & Me"
Chart (2015)	Position
France (SNEP)	99

2024 year-end chart performance for "You & Me"
Chart (2024)	Position
Portugal (AFP)	124
Switzerland (Schweizer Hitparade)	45

2025 year-end chart performance for "You & Me"
Chart (2025)	Position
Belgium (Ultratop 50 Flanders)	156

== Certifications and sales ==
Certifications for "You & Me"
Region	Certification	Certified units/sales
Australia (ARIA)	3× Platinum	210,000^{‡}
Brazil (Pro-Música Brasil)	Gold	30,000^{‡}
Denmark (IFPI Danmark)	Platinum	90,000^{‡}
France (SNEP) Rivo remix	Gold	100,000^{‡}
Germany (BVMI)	3× Gold	450,000^{‡}
Italy (FIMI)	Platinum	50,000^{‡}
New Zealand (RMNZ)	4× Platinum	120,000^{‡}
Portugal (AFP)	3× Platinum	30,000^{‡}
Spain (Promusicae)	Platinum	60,000^{‡}
Switzerland (IFPI Switzerland)	2× Platinum	60,000^{‡}
United Kingdom (BPI)	3× Platinum	1,800,000^{‡}
Streaming
Greece (IFPI Greece)	4× Platinum	8,000,000^{†}
Greece (IFPI Greece) Rivo remix	4× Platinum	8,000,000^{†}
^{‡} Sales+streaming figures based on certification alone.^{†} Streaming-only figures based on certification alone.

== Release history ==
Region	Date	Format	Label
United Kingdom	28 April 2013	Digital download	Island
