= Rollerblades (Eliza Doolittle song) =

2010 single

Single by Eliza Doolittle

from the album Eliza Doolittle
- B-side: "Doo Little"
- Released: 17 October 2010
- Recorded: 2010
- Genre: Pop
- Length: 3:06
- Label: EMI
- Songwriters: Eliza Doolittle; Jonny Sharp; Craigie Dodds
- Producers: Craigie Dodds; Jonny Sharp

Eliza Doolittle singles chronology
"Pack Up" (2010)	"Rollerblades" (2010)	"Skinny Genes" (2010)

Music video
- "Rollerblades" on YouTube

"Rollerblades" is the third single from British recording artist Eliza Doolittle, taken from her eponymous debut album. It was released on 17 October 2010 and peaked at 58. The track was added to BBC Radio 1's A-Playlist.

== Release and promotion ==
The song was released on 4 January 2011 on US iTunes Store as the 'Free Single of the Week'.

The song was recently used for a commercial for the Toyota Prius v.

== Music video ==
The music video for the song appeared on Doolittle's YouTube channel on 21 September 2010. It was shot in the Greenwich Village neighbourhood of New York City and shows Eliza cycling around the city.

== Critical reception ==
Fraser McAlpine of BBC Chart Blog gave the song a positive review stating:

For an emotion we all yearn to feel, as much as we possibly can, light-hearted skippyfun can be very, very troublesome to capture in popular music. Too much sugar, as we all know, rots the teeth, and makes people feel sick. So it's often a good idea to leaven it with a bit of sourness, just to cleanse the palate.

It's a tough balance to strike though. Too much sour is even worse than too much sweet, cos it curdles the whole confection. Ideally, you'd want a song something like this, something which seems to be full of sunlight and happysighs; something which tumbles through your mind like a carrier bag lifted into the afternoon sky by a gentle breeze.

Unfortunately, the lighter and happier you sound, the more you risk annoying people, rather than carrying them along with your infectious giddiness, so it needs to also have some great big clumping clown feet, just to keep it from disappearing in a puff of twee..

== Track listings ==
Digital download

1
No.	Title	Length
1.	"Rollerblades"	3:06
2.	"Doo Little"	2:45
3.	"Rollerblades" (Radio Edit)	3:02

2
No.	Title	Length
1.	"Rollerblades" (Video)	3:10

iTunes EP

No.	Title	Length
1.	"Rollerblades"	3:06
2.	"Doo Little"	2:45
3.	"Rollerblades" (Radio Edit)	3:02
4.	"Rollerblades" (Video)	3:10

== Chart performance ==
"Rollerblades" debuted on the UK Singles Chart at number 91 on 17 October 2010 before climbing to number 58 the following week; upon physical release.

Chart (2010)	Peak position
Belgium (Ultratip Bubbling Under Flanders)	11
UK Singles (Official Charts)	58

== Release history ==
Region	Date	Format	Label
United Kingdom	17 October 2010	Digital download	EMI
