= Mr Medicine =

Single by Eliza Doolittle

from the album Eliza Doolittle
- Released: 7 March 2011
- Recorded: 2010
- Genre: Pop
- Length: 3:27
- Label: Parlophone
- Songwriters: John Beck; Steve Chrisanthou; Eliza Doolittle
- Producer: Steve Chrisanthou

Eliza Doolittle singles chronology
"Skinny Genes" (2010)	"Mr Medicine" (2011)	"You & Me" (2013)

Music video
- "Mr Medicine" on YouTube

"Mr Medicine" is the fourth single from British recording artist Eliza Doolittle, taken from her debut album Eliza Doolittle. It was released on 7 March 2011 and peaked at 130.

== Promotion ==
On 22 March 2011 Eliza performed the song on The Alan Titchmarsh Show. On 23 March 2011 she performed the song on Daybreak. She then performed the song on Fern on 4 April 2011. She also Performed on Brazilian late night show "Altas Horas" on 16 October 2011.

== Music video ==
The music video for the song appeared on Doolittle's YouTube channel on 11 February 2011.

In the video, Eliza comes to a restaurant, which is poised to play the music (her own) Go Home. As she leaves, the song "Mr. Medicine" starts to play and Eliza is followed by a monster. She is walking and singing on her way home. More and more monsters appear and start to dance. When Eliza comes home she slams the door behind her, locking the arm of one of the monsters. The monster gets the arm and walks away with the others, in a row.

== Credits and personnel ==
- Lead vocals – Eliza Doolittle
- Producers – Steve Chrisanthou
- Lyrics – John Beck, Steve Chrisanthou, Eliza Doolittle
- Label: Parlophone

== Track listings ==
Digital download

No.	Title	Length
1.	"Mr Medicine"	3:27

== Chart performance ==
Chart (2011)	Peak position
UK Singles (The Official Charts Company)	130
