= The Wades =

- Origin: South London, United Kingdom
- Genres: R&B, gospel
- Labels: Famecity Entertainment, Kingsway Music

The Wades are a UK gospel and R&B group from South London.

== Musical career ==
The band formed in the late 1980s, and was most active from 1987 to 2000.

The group has released several albums, and is renowned for their dynamic live performances. The Wades are credited with the "biggest ever" launch of a UK gospel album, and have been credited with pioneering British gospel's movement into R&B.

Most recently they appeared on the "One Voice, One Heart" charity single, recorded in February 2005 and released at Easter to raise funds for the survivors of the Southeast Asia tsunami.

In 2000, the Wade brothers started their own record label called FameCity Entertainment.

=== Influences ===
The Wades have been called "a British version of the Winans" and were credited with pioneering British gospel's move into R&B.

The group are featured in the ground breaking book British Black Gospel by author and specialist gospel writer Steve Alexander Smith.

== Members ==
Current members of the band include brothers Derek, David and Lloyd Wade. A fourth brother Denis appeared on their debut album A Touch of Heaven, released in 1994. The four brothers were instrumental in the recording of the debut album which they all co-produced and co-wrote under the musical direction of Lloyd.

== Discography ==
=== Albums ===
A Family Thing

- Released: 2000
- Format: CD
- Label: Famecity Entertainment Ltd
- Tracks: "Soul Thing", "Family Thing", "Shooting for the Moon", "Friend", "Love in a Million Ways", "I Worship You", "Because of You", "Condition of the Heart (Beats Zone)"

Family Thing (Make Change Garage Mix) (Single)

- Released: 2000
- Format: CD
- Label: Famecity Entertainment Ltd FEL67100-3

The Feel Good Factor

- Released: 18 July 1997
- Format: CD
- Label: Kingsway Music KMCD2024
- Tracks: "Dancing Never Stops", "What A Fool Believes", "Another Day", "Another Day in Deep Funk Slow Jam Remix", "When Will We Learn", "Dancing Never Stops (Instrumental)", "Lift Your Spirit", "The Vibe"

A Touch of Heaven

- Released: 1994
- Label: Kingsway Music KMCD822
- Tracks: (unverified) "Get Off That (Poison)", "Best Thing", "A Touch of Heaven", "Trust in My Love", "Make It Right"

Get Off That

- Released: 1993
- Format: 12-inch vinyl album
- Label: Independent
