= Josh Osho =

- Born: 1992 (age 33–34); South London, England
- Genres: Acoustic, alternative, R&B
- Instruments: Vocals, guitar
- Years active: 2011–present
- Website: joshosho.com

Josh Osho is an English singer-songwriter from South London, who was previously signed to Island Records.

== Early life ==
Osho was brought up in South London by his parents Nigerian born father and Irish Nigerian mother. He attended Graveney School in Tooting, South London where he found himself good at English as well as being a keen footballer. He began writing songs from an early age, when one of his mother's friends threw out a guitar, which he then started to learn. Osho was brought up religiously, accompanying his mother to church twice a week.

== Music career ==
Osho was soon brought to the attention of Island Records and signed in mid-2011.

Osho's first single "Redemption Days" was released on 4 September 2011 and featured Ghostface Killah. In December 2011, Osho performed an acoustic cover of Adele's "Someone like You" for SB.TV.

In early 2012, he toured with Rizzle Kicks as their support act. In April 2012, while touring with Emeli Sandé, Osho released his follow-up single "Giants" featuring Childish Gambino. He performed an acoustic version of the song for T4's Freshly Squeezed. In May 2012, after performing "Redemption Days" on Later... with Jools Holland, Osho's music started to become noticed by mainstream media. "Redemption Days" became Record of the Week on BBC Radio 1, BBC Radio 2 and BBC Radio 1Xtra as well as being added to the B List of all three major stations. On 8 June 2012, The Sun reported that Osho was to write a single with Tom Jones after the pair met backstage at the final of The Voice UK. Osho soon confirmed this via Twitter. On 15 June, Osho performed his track "Redemption Days" and a cover of "Too Close" by Alex Clare in Radio 1's Live Lounge. On 22 June Osho performed "Redemption Days" on CBBC programme Friday Download.

He played his first headline gig to a sold out Jazz Café, Camden Town on 25 June to coincide with the release day of his album L.I.F.E (Learning Is For Ever). This album received mixed reviews with NME giving it a score of 2.5 stars out of 5. The reviewer noted "There’s no denying Osho’s got a great voice and a backstory of X Factor magnitude", but added "he's forgotten that you can have all the motivational verses in the world, but you still need tunes".

On 1 July 2012, Osho joined Tom Jones on stage at his Hammersmith Apollo gig to perform a surprise duet. On 13 July, Osho supported Jessie J at her Warwick Castle gig. Through summer 2012, Osho played a handful of headline gigs around London before beginning a festival tour including T4 on the Beach, Wireless Festival, T in the Park and V Festival. On 3 September 2012, Osho released an extended play entitled "The John Doe EP". The seven previously unreleased tracks were made available for free, via Soulculture. Later that week, he joined The Script for four dates of their UK Tour, including a night in London at the O2 Shepherd's Bush Empire on 12 September. On 21 September, Osho appeared on the programme 'BBC Four Sessions with Sir Tom Jones', performing a cover the song "Black, Brown & White" originally recorded by Big Bill Broonzy, with Jones and his band. In mid-November 2012, Osho toured with Gabrielle Aplin across England and Wales.

In October 2012 The Independent labelled him as "one to watch".

On 13 January 2013, Osho's third single "Imperfections" was added to the BBC Radio 2 A Playlist, peaking at number 40 on the UK Airplay Chart. On 18 February, Osho premiered the music video for "Even in War" from "The John Doe EP". As of March 2013, Osho had been dropped by Island Records. On 7 March, Osho played his first gig of 2013, supporting Ne-Yo at Under the Bridge in London.

== Discography ==
=== Studio albums ===
Title	Album details	Peak chart positions	Certifications
Title	Album details	UK	Certifications
L.I.F.E	First studio album; Released: 25 June 2012; Label: Island Records	88	—

=== Singles ===
==== As lead artist ====
Title	Year	Peak chart positions		Album
Title	Year	UK	IRE	Album
"Redemption Days" (featuring Ghostface Killah)	2011	89	—	L.I.F.E
"Giants" (featuring Childish Gambino)	2012	–	—	L.I.F.E
"Imperfections"	2013	–	—	L.I.F.E
"Freewheel"	2013	–	—	L.I.F.E

==== As featured artist ====
Title	Year	Peak chart positions		Album
Title	Year	US	CAN	Album
"Wonderful" (Childish Gambino featuring Josh Osho)	2012	–	—	R O Y A L T Y
"Lose Myself" (Akala featuring Josh Osho)	2013	–	—	Banquet of Thieves
