= Eliza Doolittle (EP) =

EP by Elize Doolittle
- Released: 29 November 2009
- Recorded: 2009
- Genre: Pop

Elize Doolittle chronology
| Eliza Doolittle (2009) | Eliza Doolittle (2010) |

Eliza Doolittle is an EP by British recording artist Eliza Doolittle. It was released in the UK on 29 November 2009 by digital download.

== Track listing ==
Digital download

| No. | Title | Length |
|---|---|---|
| 1. | "Rollerblades" | 3:06 |
| 2. | "Moneybox" | 3:00 |
| 3. | "Police Car" | 3:21 |
| 4. | "Go Home" | 2:59 |

== Chart performance ==
| Chart (2010) | Peak position |
|---|---|
| UK Albums Chart | 196 |

== Release history ==
| Region | Date | Format | Label |
|---|---|---|---|
| United Kingdom | 29 November 2009 | Digital download | Parlophone |
| United Kingdom | 29 November 2009 | CD | Parlophone |
