= My Soul Pleads for You =

Single by Simon Webbe

from the album Grace
- B-side: "When You Were Young"
- Released: 19 February 2007
- Recorded: 2006
- Genre: Pop
- Length: 3:48
- Label: Innocent Records
- Songwriters: Wesley Johnson, Clinton Outen
- Producer: Wesley Johnson

Simon Webbe singles chronology
"Coming Around Again" (2006)	"My Soul Pleads for You" (2007)	"Seventeen" (2007)

"My Soul Pleads For You" is the second single released from Blue band-member Simon Webbe's second solo album, Grace. The track was first premiered on 12 December 2006 through Webbe's official website. The B-side for the single is a cover version of The Killers first single, "When You Were Young", recorded live on the BBC Radio 1 Live Lounge. The single was only released in the UK and the Netherlands, the latter due to notable airplay and live performances by Webbe in the country. The single subsequently peaked at #38 on the Dutch Singles Chart. The single failed to enter the UK Top 100 upon its release via iTunes in January 2007, but managed to peak at #45 upon its physical release.

== Track listing ==
1. "My Soul Pleads For You" - 3:05
2. "When You Were Young" - 2:57

== Charts ==
Chart (2007)	Peak position
Netherlands (Single Top 100)	38
Italy (FIMI)	47
Italy (Musica e dischi)	30
Slovak IFPI Chart	62
Turkish Nielsen Chart	77
United Kingdom	45
UK Airplay (Music Week)	36
