= Eliza Doolittle (album) =

Studio album by Eliza Doolittle
- Released: 12 July 2010
- Recorded: 1 September 2006 – 31 March 2010
- Studio: Stanley House Studios, Swamp Studios, The Diary Studios, 600 Feet Studios (London) · Echo Studios (Los Angeles)
- Genre: Indie pop; folk; soul; ska
- Length: 41:12
- Label: Parlophone
- Producer: Steve Chrisanthou; Craigie Dodds; Jimmy Napes; Matthew Prime; Jonny Sharp; Phil Thornalley; Mads Hauge; James Napier; Greg Kurstin

Eliza Doolittle chronology
Eliza Doolittle (2009)	Eliza Doolittle (2010)	In Your Hands (2013)

Singles from Eliza Doolittle
- 1. "Skinny Genes" Released: 11 April 2010; 2. "Pack Up" Released: 5 July 2010; 3. "Rollerblades" Released: 17 October 2010; 4. "Skinny Genes (re-release)" Released: 27 December 2010; 5. "Mr Medicine" Released: 7 March 2011

Eliza Doolittle is the debut album by British recording artist Eliza Doolittle. It was released by Parlophone Records on 12 July 2010 in the United Kingdom. The first single, "Skinny Genes", was released on 11 April 2010. The second single, "Pack Up", was released on 5 July 2010. The album was released in the United States on 19 April 2011.

== Critical reception ==
Professional ratings
Aggregate scores
Source	Rating
Metacritic	68/100
Review scores
Source	Rating
AllMusic	3.5/5 stars
BBC Music	(mixed)
The Guardian	4/5 stars
Evening Standard	4/5 stars
The Music Fix	4/5 stars
The Irish Times	unfavourable
PopMatters	(7/10)
FasterLouder	3.5/5 stars

Upon release, Eliza Doolittle received positive reviews from music critics. At Metacritic, which assigns a normalized rating out of 100 to reviews from mainstream critics, the album has an average score of 68 based on 6 reviews, indicating "generally favorable reviews". Michael Hann, writing for The Guardian, called Eliza Doolittle "a coherent and effortless-sounding debut album [...] It's a delicious soufflé [...] that feels as light as air, melting on your tongue. Admittedly, that also means that as soon as it is over it has disappeared without a trace, but do picnic soundtracks really need to be weighed down with pretensions to significance?" Steve Horowitz from PopMatters fount that the album "mostly succeeds. The baker's dozen worth of tracks here are delightfully sweet, if maybe a bit light in content. This is ear candy that's meant to be pleasing rather than personal, and avoids political or controversial topics."

AllMusic editor by Jon O'Brien found that the "formula of brush-stroke percussion, bluesy guitars, and light airy melodies is repeated throughout the entire 13 tracks, but Doolittle's timeless and effortlessly dreamy tones make the slight repetitiveness a lot easier to endure [...] While its relentless chirpiness may be a little too twee for some, Eliza Doolittle is still a beguiling debut that would undoubtedly have found an audience even without the benefit of her showbiz background." Fraser McAlpine of BBC wrote that "if you can handle a lot of wacky in your pop music, there's a lovely album here waiting for you."

== Chart performance ==
Eliza Doolitte peaked at number three on the UK Albums Chart. On 7 January 2011, it was announced by the British Phonographic Industry (BPI) that the album had been certified Platinum for sales of 300,000 in the UK.

== Track listing ==
No.	Title	Writer(s)	Producer(s)	Length
1.	"Moneybox"	Eliza Caird; Matthew Prime; Tim Woodcock	Prime	3:04
2.	"Rollerblades"	Caird; Jonny Sharp; Craigie Dodds	Dodds; Sharp	3:03
3.	"Go Home"	Caird; Phil Thornalley; Mads Hauge	Thornalley; Hauge	2:58
4.	"Skinny Genes"	Caird; Prime; Woodcock	Prime	3:05
5.	"Mr Medicine"	Caird; John Beck; Steven Chrisanthou	Chrisanthou	3:27
6.	"Missing"	Caird; Dodds	Dodds	3:43
7.	"Back to Front"	Caird; Dodds; Will Johnstone	Dodds	3:41
8.	"A Smokey Room"	Caird; Sharp; Dodds	Dodds, Sharp	2:53
9.	"So High"	Caird; James Napier	Napier	2:41
10.	"Nobody"	Caird; Greg Kurstin; Lauren Christy	Kurstin	3:00
11.	"Pack Up"	Caird; Prime; Woodcock; George Powell; Felix Powell	Prime	3:11
12.	"Police Car"	Caird; Dodds	Dodds	3:21
13.	"Empty Hand"	Caird; Kurstin	Kurstin	3:05

(iTunes Canada/US bonus track)
No.	Title	Writer(s)	Producer(s)	Length
14.	"I'll Be Your Pillow"	Caird; Dodds	Dodds	2:41

Notes

- "Missing" features a sample from the 1959 The Fleetwoods hit "Come Softly to Me"
- "Pack Up" features uncredited vocals from Lloyd Wade and contains elements of "Pack Up Your Troubles in Your Old Kit-Bag"

== Personnel ==
- Eliza Doolittle – lead vocals, composer, original concept
- George Asaf – composer
- Avigail – stylist
- John Beck – composer, keyboards
- Andy Bradfield – mixing
- Ian Brudge – cello
- Steve Chrisanthou – bass, composer, engineer, guitar, mixing, producer, programming
- Lauren Christy – composer
- Pete Davis – programming
- Craigie Dodds – bass, composer, drums, guitar, keyboards, mixing, piano, producer, programming, ukulele, backing vocals, whistle
- Grippa – mixing
- Mads Hauge – bass, composer, engineer, hand clapping, mandolin, maracas, melodica, producer, whistle
- Simon Helm – art direction, design
- Dean James – engineer, percussion
- Will Johnstone – composer, engineer, mellotron
- Jonny $. – bass, composer, guitar, mixing, percussion, producer
- Greg Kurstin – composer, engineer, guitar, keyboards, mixing, producer, programming
- Arnulf Lindner – double bass
- Tom Meadows – drums
- Jimmy Napes – mixing, producer
- James Napier – bass, composer, drums, guitar
- Jake Newman – double bass
- Felix Powell – composer
- Matt Prime – composer, guitar, keyboards, mixing, producer, programming, backing vocals
- Dan Sanders – art direction
- Ash Soan – drums
- The PSM – drums, percussion
- Liz Taw – hair stylist
- Phil Thornalley – composer, glockenspiel, guitar, handclapping, piano, producer
- Lloyd Wade – vocals
- Andy Whitton – photography
- Paul Williams – guitar
- Tim Woodcock – composer, backing vocals
- Christian Wright – mastering

== Charts ==
=== Weekly charts ===
Chart (2010)	Peak position
Australian Albums (ARIA)	55
Belgian Albums (Ultratop Flanders)	46
Belgian Albums (Ultratop Wallonia)	100
Canada (Canoe)	89
Danish Albums (Hitlisten)	38
Dutch Albums (Album Top 100)	45
French Albums (SNEP)	101
Irish Albums (IRMA)	10
Italian Albums (FIMI)	55
Spanish Albums (Promusicae)	46
UK Albums (OCC)	3

=== Year-end charts ===
Chart (2010)	Position
UK Albums (OCC)	44
Chart (2011)	Position
UK Albums (OCC)	74

== Certifications ==
Region	Certification	Certified units/sales
United Kingdom (BPI)	Platinum	300,000^{^}
^{^} Shipments figures based on certification alone.

== Release history ==
List of release dates, showing region, formats, label, and editions
Region	Date	Format(s)	Label	Edition
United Kingdom	12 July 2010	CD; digital download	Parlophone	Standard
Brazil	15 September 2010	CD; digital download	EMI	Standard
Italy	28 September 2010	CD; digital download	EMI	Standard
Canada	8 February 2011	CD; digital download	EMI	Standard
United States	19 April 2011	Digital download	Capitol Records	Standard
