= Smile (Simon Webbe album) =

Studio album by Simon Webbe
- Released: 13 October 2017
- Studio: Metrophonic Studios, England
- Genre: Pop; R&B
- Length: 40:53
- Label: Soundwave Music
- Producer: Brian Rawling, Paul Meehan

Simon Webbe chronology
Live (2007)	Smile (2017)

Singles from Smile
- 1. "Nothing Without You" Released: 12 July 2017; 2. "Flashback" Released: 6 October 2017

Smile is the third studio album from Simon Webbe. The album was released on 13 October 2017. The album is the first collection of solo material from Webbe in a decade.

Discussing the meaning behind the album title, Webbe told Entertainment Focus: "The album is called Smile because not a lot of people are smiling these days. Everybody's too busy using their phones to connect, nobody's really connecting anymore. For me, I just wanted to put a title out there that was self-explanatory and will hit home."

The album is inspired by Webbe's fiancé Ashen Kemal, to whom he proposed on Valentine's Day 2017.

The album hit number 76 in the midweek UK Album Chart Update, however ultimately failed to chart in the Top 100.

== Singles ==
"Nothing Without You" was released on 12 July 2017 as the album's lead single. "Flashback" was released as the album's second single on 6 October 2017.

== Track listing ==
No.	Title	Writer(s)	Length
1.	"Nothing Without You"	Simon Webbe, Dom Liu, Sean McDonagh	3:32
2.	"Flashback"	Webbe, Paul Barry, Patrick Mascal	3:54
3.	"Jigsaw"	Webbe, Barry, Mascal	3:13
4.	"Love Your Woman"	Webbe, Barry, Tim Deal	4:11
5.	"First to the Last Kiss"	Webbe, Ian Brown, Paul Meehan	3:49
6.	"Please Don't Let Me Go"	Webbe, McDonagh, Meehan	3:26
7.	"Gotta Get Close to You"	Webbe, Lauren Flynn	3:36
8.	"Dance on My Own"	Webbe, Flynn	3:31
9.	"More Than Perfect"	Webbe, Brown, Meehan	3:14
10.	"One Last Time"	Webbe, Brown, Meehan	3:39
11.	"Never Mind"	Webbe, Josh Breaks, Meehan	3:24
12.	"Smile"	Webbe, Breaks, Meehan	3:24
