= Sanctuary (Simon Webbe album) =

Studio album by Simon Webbe
- Released: 14 November 2005
- Length: 46:12
- Labels: Innocent; EMI
- Producers: Chris Braide; Steve DuBerry; James Fraser; Martin Harrington; Ash Howes; Steve Mac; Matt Prime; Reed Vertelney; Barnaby Williams

Simon Webbe chronology
Sanctuary (2005)	Grace (2006)

Singles from Sanctuary
- 1. "Lay Your Hands" Released: 29 August 2005; 2. "No Worries" Released: 7 November 2005; 3. "After All This Time" Released: 8 February 2006

Sanctuary is the debut studio album by English singer Simon Webbe. It was released on 14 November 2005 through Innocent Records. Webbe's first solo project following the disbandment of his group Blue, he worked with Matt Prime and Tim Woodcock on the majority of the album. Additional collaborators include Chris Braide, Steve DuBerry, Martin Harrington, Ash Howes, and Steve Mac, among others. Webbe co-wrote eight of the twelve tracks that made the album's track listing.

In the United Kingdom, Sanctuary debuted at number 28 and gradually climbed to a peak position of number seven on the UK Albums Chart. It sold over 700,000 units domestically and was eventually certified double platinum by the British Phonographic Industry (BPI). Three singles were released from the album, including "Lay Your Hands", which peaked at number four on the UK Singles Chart, "No Worries", which also peaked at number four, and "After All This Time", which peaked at number 16.

== Critical reception ==
Professional ratings
Review scores
Source	Rating
AllMusic	3.5/5 stars
The Guardian	3/5 stars
MTV Asia	6/10

Jon O'Brien of Allmusic gave the album three and a half stars out of five. He called the Sanctuary the "most confident and melodic debut album from a UK boy band member since Robbie Williams' Life Thru a Lens" and further wrote: "Eschewing the slick Americanized urban vibes most people were anticipating, its 12 tracks instead focus on a much mellower acoustic sound, which, when combined with Webbe's smooth vocal tones, recalls the sun-drenched soul of '90s duo Lighthouse Family rather than the glossy-produced R&B pop of Usher." Lancashire Telegraph editor John Anson noted that Sanctuary "shows a softer more soulful side, which may surprise some" and declared it "one for a Sunday afternoon."

Caroline Sullivan from The Guardian rated the album three out of five stars. She found that "Webbe was Blue's star voice (who knew?), and his distinctive warmth is as alluring on its own as it is when bolstered by three other voices [...] His primary talent is sounding heartfelt, no matter how trite the subject; he could soon be giving Seal a run for his money. News24 critic Alistair Fairweather felt that "the tracks on Sanctuary are, without exception, pleasant, comforting and safe. Whether he's singing about true love, loss or jealousy, Simon is always more intent on pleasing his listener and sounding good than on expressing any particular emotion. The production on Sanctuary is equally slick and equally safe, exploiting twinkly guitar riffs and bouncy backing tunes without ever straying anywhere dark or daring."

== Commercial performance ==
In the United Kingdom, Sanctuary debuted at number 28 on the UK Albums Chart. It was not until its 17th week on the chart that it peaked at number seven. A steady seller, the album was certified gold by the British Phonographic Industry (BPI) on 2 December 2005 and eventually reached platinum status on 23 December 2005 and double platinum status on 17 March 2006. By June 2012, the album had sold 700,000 copies domestically. Elsewhere, Sanctuary reached the top 20 in Italy, the Netherlands, and Scotland.

== Track listing ==
Sanctuary track listing
No.	Title	Writer(s)	Producer(s)	Length
1.	"Lay Your Hands"	Simon Webbe; Matt Prime; Tim Woodcock	Matt Prime	4:28
2.	"No Worries"	Webbe; Prime; Woodcock	Prime	3:29
3.	"After All This Time"	Webbe; Prime; Woodcock	Prime	3:36
4.	"A Little High"	Webbe; Prime; Woodcock	Prime	3:47
5.	"Time of Your Life"	Webbe; Prime; Woodcock	Prime	3:35
6.	"Unjustified"	Webbe; Prime; Woodcock	Prime	3:41
7.	"Free"	Eg White; Bill Padley	Ash Howes; Martin Harrington	3:10
8.	"Ashamed"	Webbe; Chris Braide	Braide	3:33
9.	"Only Love"	Reed Vertelney; Lindy Robbins	Vertelney	3:45
10.	"All I Want"	Webbe; Steve DuBerry	DuBerry	3:44
11.	"Star"	Steve Mac; Wayne Hector	Mac	3:21
12.	"Sanctuary"	Vertelney; Robbins; Peter Gordeno	Vertelney	4:03
Total length:				46:12

== Charts ==
=== Weekly charts ===
Weekly chart performance for Sanctuary
Chart (2005–2006)	Peak position
Dutch Albums (Album Top 100)	19
German Albums (Offizielle Top 100)	96
Irish Albums (IRMA)	87
Italian Albums (FIMI)	20
Italian Albums (Musica e dischi)	45
Japanese Albums (Oricon)	142
Scottish Albums (Official Charts)	16
Swiss Albums (Schweizer Hitparade)	45
UK Albums (Official Charts)	7

=== Year-end charts ===
2005 year-end chart performance for Sanctuary
Chart (2005)	Position
UK Albums (OCC)	65

2006 year-end chart performance for Sanctuary
Chart (2006)	Position
UK Albums (OCC)	66

== Certifications ==
Certifications of Sanctuary
Region	Certification	Certified units/sales
United Kingdom (BPI)	2× Platinum	600,000^{^}
^{^} Shipments figures based on certification alone.
