= Pack Up =

2010 single by Eliza Doolittle

Single by Eliza Doolittle

from the album Eliza Doolittle
- B-side: "I'll Be Your Pillow"; "Skinny Genes" (unplugged)
- Released: 5 July 2010
- Genre: Pop; jazz pop
- Length: 3:11
- Label: Parlophone
- Songwriters: Tim Woodcock; Eliza Sophie Caird; Felix Powell; George Asaf; Matt Prime
- Producer: Matt Prime

Eliza singles chronology
"Skinny Genes" (2010)	"Pack Up" (2010)	"Rollerblades" (2010)

Music video
- Eliza Doolittle - Pack Up on YouTube

"Pack Up" is the second single by British recording artist Eliza Doolittle, taken from her debut album, Eliza Doolittle. It was released on 5 July 2010. The song lyrics contain the title of the 1915 song "Pack Up Your Troubles in Your Old Kit-Bag". The music contains elements of the 1963 ska song "Wash Your Troubles Away" by Prince Buster. Lloyd Wade sings the main hook with Doolittle. The single was Doolittle's debut in most European countries.

== Critical reception ==
The song received positive reviews, with the song being praised for its lyrics and its catchiness. Nick Levine of Digital Spy commended the song: "Quirky? You betcha, but the result is also a lovely summery pop song - just one of many lovely summery pop songs on Doolittle's upcoming album."

== Chart performance ==
"Pack Up" debuted on the Irish Singles Chart at number 15 on 9 July 2010, marking Doolittle's first top 40 hit in Ireland. The following week the single rose a single place to number 14 and later peaked at number 6.

The single also debuted on the UK Singles Chart on 11 July 2010 at number 12, beating previous single's "Skinny Genes" peak of number 22, the next week it climbed to number 8 making it her first Top 10 hit. On the third week in the UK Singles Chart, the single rose to number 5.

It was also used on Hollyoaks in 2010 as shown as a tribute video to Steph Cunningham.

== Music video ==
The music video was shot in Jamaica. It starts with the singer being ejected from a passing truck, apparently inside a suitcase, and then catching a bus. Doolittle then travels to different places in a Jamaican town by bus and motorbike. Towards the end of the video Doolittle appears, dancing to a dance band piano, drum and bass combo, in a lively crowd at a local dance hall. The video ends with her sitting in a dinghy, near the beach, after throwing a suitcase (containing a transistor radio) into the sea (an interpretation of the lyric "pack up your troubles in your old kit bag and bury them beneath the sea").

In the video the Lloyd Wade "pack up" main hook line appears to be voiced first by an elderly keeper of a drapers' shop and later by the bass player of the dance band.

== Track listings ==
Digital download
No.	Title	Length
1.	"Pack Up"	3:11
2.	"I'll Be Your Pillow"	2:38
3.	"Skinny Genes" (Unplugged)	3:05

== Charts ==
=== Weekly charts ===
Chart (2010)	Peak position
Australia (ARIA)	96
Belgium (Ultratop 50 Flanders)	10
Belgium Airplay (Ultratop 50 Flanders)	1
Belgium (Ultratop 50 Wallonia)	34
Belgium Airplay (Ultratop 50 Wallonia)	16
Denmark (Tracklisten)	37
Europe (European Hot 100 Singles)	20
Finland (Suomen virallinen lista)	16
Germany (GfK)	49
Germany Airplay (Nielsen)	40
Ireland (IRMA)	6
Italy (FIMI)	24
Italy Airplay (EarOne)	1
Netherlands (Dutch Top 40)	8
Netherlands (Single Top 100)	19
Scotland Singles (OCC)	4
Switzerland (Schweizer Hitparade)	75
UK Singles (OCC)	5

=== Year-end charts ===
Chart (2010)	Position
Belgium (Ultratop 50 Flanders)	63
Italy Airplay (EarOne)	15
Netherlands (Dutch Top 40)	28
Netherlands (Single Top 100)	66
UK Singles (OCC)	28

== Certifications ==
Region	Certification	Certified units/sales
United Kingdom (BPI)	Platinum	600,000^{‡}
^{‡} Sales+streaming figures based on certification alone.

== Release information ==
Country	Release date	Format
United Kingdom	5 July 2010	Digital download

== In popular culture ==
- In early 2011, the song has featured on British television in the advertisement for Kinder Surprise. The song is also used in a Brazilian soap opera called Insensato Coração and it is included on the soap opera's soundtrack.
- It was featured on the season 2 premiere of "Mob Wives".
- It was also played in the background of Cher Lloyd's audition on The X Factor UK in 2010.
- It was also used in the closing credits to the last live edition of ITV's coverage of the 2010 Tour de France.
