= Skinny Genes =

Single by Eliza Doolittle

from the album Eliza Doolittle
- B-side: "Police Car"
- Released: 11 April 2010
- Genre: Indie pop; ska; folk-pop
- Length: 3:03
- Label: Parlophone
- Songwriters: Eliza Caird; Matthew Prime; Tim Woodcock
- Producer: Matthew Prime

Eliza Doolittle singles chronology
"Piano Song" (2008)	"Skinny Genes" (2010)	"Pack Up" (2010)
"Rollerblades" (2010)	""Skinny Genes" (re-release)" (2010)	"Mr Medicine" (2011)

Music video
- "Skinny Genes" on YouTube

"Skinny Genes" is a song performed by British recording artist Eliza Doolittle. The song serves as her debut single and first single from her debut album, Eliza Doolittle. The track was co-written by Doolittle in collaboration with Tim Woodcock and the song's producer Matthew Prime. "Skinny Genes" was one of three tracks where Doolittle had worked with Prime and Woodcock for her debut album. The single was officially released on 11 April 2010 by Parlophone Records on digital download-only format, accompanied by a b-side entitled "Police Car" (written by Doolittle and Craigie Dodds). The track is inspired by love-hate relationships and contains prominent indie pop musical characteristics. Lyrically, "Skinny Genes" refers from a feminist point of view to how one can dislike all the personality traits of a partner but still enjoy the sexual chemistry one shares with them.

"Skinny Genes" garnered a positive response from contemporary music critics. The song also achieved mainstream success; debuting and peaking at number twenty-two on the UK Singles Chart. The song was accompanied by a 70s and 80s-styled music video directed by Daniel Eskills and released on 25 December 2009. Doolittle performed the single live at London Fashion Week and on the British television stations GMTV and STV. "Skinny Genes" featured in an advert for Very featuring Fearne Cotton and Holly Willoughby.

"Skinny Genes" was later re-released on 27 December 2010. A new video was made from the re-release. The track went on to make BBC Radio 1's A-Playlist in the UK in late 2010.

"Skinny Genes" is written in the key of E major and follows the chord progression E major, F♯ minor, and B major.

== Background ==
"Skinny Genes" was the first single from Eliza Doolittle, Doolittle's debut album. Before its official release, "Rollerblades" was originally speculated to be Doolittle's debut single. "Skinny Genes" was later confirmed as her official debut single and was originally planned for release on 29 March 2010. It was then pushed back for release on 5 April. The single was finally pushed back another week and officially released on 11 April 2010 on digital download format only. A planned CD single release for "Skinny Genes" on 12 April 2010 failed to surface.

"Skinny Genes" was mischievously inspired lyrically by an irritating but sexy boy. Doolittle described the song as having very light and happy but thoughtful lyrics, saying: "I think about what I want to say, when I write songs." Leonie Cooper of The Guardian described the song as having "tell-it-like-it-is-lyrics". Doolittle explained "Skinny Genes" to BBC Radio's Steve Lamacq:

The single is something I made up in my head. I just thought it would be quite a funny scenario where you didn't like someone, if they were really annoying, but you had a good time under the sheets.

== Track listing ==
- Digital single
1. "Skinny Genes" – 3:03
2. "Skinny Genes" (Slugz & Joe London Mix) – 5:31
3. "Police Car" – 3:21
- The Remixes Promo
1. "Skinny Genes" (Acid Washed Radio Edit) – 3:31
2. "Skinny Genes" (Acid Washed Main Mix) – 4:14
3. "Skinny Genes" (Acid Washed Dub Remix) – 4:42
4. "Skinny Genes" (Melé Remix) – 5:36
5. "Skinny Genes" (Slugz & Joe London Mix) – 5:31

- Re-release digital download #1
1. "Skinny Genes" – 3:05
- Re-release digital download #2
1. "Skinny Genes" – 3:05
2. "Skinny Genes" (music video) (second version) - 3:03

== Charts ==
Chart (2010)	Peak position
Belgium (Ultratop 50 Flanders)	42
Belgium (Ultratip Bubbling Under Wallonia)	31
German Singles Chart	42
Ireland (IRMA)	42
Israel International Airplay (Media Forest)	9
Netherlands (Single Top 100)	90
Poland Airplay (ZPAV)	4
Switzerland (Schweizer Hitparade)	48
UK Singles (Official Charts)	22

== Certifications ==
Region	Certification	Certified units/sales
United Kingdom (BPI)	Silver	200,000^{‡}
^{‡} Sales+streaming figures based on certification alone.

== Release history ==
Region	Date	Format	Label
United Kingdom	11 April 2010	Digital download	Parlophone Records
Germany	11 April 2010	Digital download	EMI Music
Poland	19 June 2010	Airplay	EMI Music
Germany	26 November 2010	Digital download	Parlophone Records
The Netherlands	1 December 2010	Digital download	Universal
United Kingdom	27 December 2010; 22 December 2010	Digital download #1; Digital download #2	EMI
