= Grace / Ride the Storm =

Single by Simon Webbe

"Grace / Ride The Storm"

Single by Simon Webbe

from the album Grace and Fantastic Four: Rise of the Silver Surfer
- Released: 18 June 2007
- Recorded: 2006
- Genre: Pop
- Length: 3:25 (Grace), 3:44 (Ride The Storm)
- Label: Innocent Records
- Songwriters: Simon Webbe, Matt Prime, Tim Woodcock (Grace); Simon Webbe, Alex Reid (Ride The Storm)
- Producers: Matt Prime, Alex Reid, James Lewis

Simon Webbe singles chronology
"Seventeen" (2007)	"Grace / Ride The Storm" (2007)	"Nothing Without You" (2017)

"Grace / Ride The Storm" is the fourth and final single released from Blue band-member Simon Webbe's second solo album, Grace. Although Ride The Storm only features on the SEA Special Edition of Grace, the song served as the official theme from the soundtrack to the 2007 sci-fi film, Fantastic Four: Rise of the Silver Surfer. The double A-side peaked at #36 on the UK Singles Chart. The single was not released in Europe – instead, Seventeen, another track from Grace, was released. Music videos for both tracks were filmed, Grace featuring Webbe performing on a high-rise building on a council estate, and Ride The Storm featuring clips of the Fantastic Four film intertwinned with clips of Webbe performing in a superhero-style outfit.

== Track listing ==
UK CD single

1. "Grace" (Single Version) – 3:24
2. "Ride The Storm" (Radio Edit) – 2:45

UK Promo Single

1. "Ride The Storm" (Full Version) – 3:44

== Charts ==
Chart performance for Grace / Ride The Storm
Chart (2007)	Peak position
Scotland Singles (OCC)	33
UK Singles (OCC)	36
UK Airplay (Music Week)	16
