= Lay Your Hands =

2005 single by Simon Webbe

Single by Simon Webbe

from the album Sanctuary
- B-side: "Me, Myself and I"
- Released: 22 August 2005
- Length: 4:28
- Label: Innocent; Virgin
- Songwriters: Simon Webbe; Matt Prime; Tim Woodcock
- Producer: Matt Prime

Simon Webbe singles chronology
"Lay Your Hands" (2005)	"No Worries" (2005)

"Lay Your Hands" is the first single released from Blue band member Simon Webbe's debut solo album, Sanctuary. The single peaked at No. 4 on the UK Singles Chart, No. 2 in Italy, and No. 9 in Spain.

== Track listings ==
UK and European CD single

1. "Lay Your Hands" – 4:29
2. "Me, Myself and I" – 3:48

UK DVD single

1. "Lay Your Hands" (video)
2. "Lay Your Hands" (Stargate remix photo gallery)
3. "Lay Your Hands" (Stargate instrumental—behind the scenes at the photo shoot, Italy, 5 May)

European maxi-CD single

1. "Lay Your Hands"
2. "Me, Myself and I"
3. "Lay Your Hands" (Stargate remix)
4. "Lay Your Hands" (video)

== Charts ==
=== Weekly charts ===
Chart (2005)	Peak position
Austria (Ö3 Austria Top 40)	48
Belgium (Ultratop 50 Flanders)	36
Europe (Eurochart Hot 100)	17
Germany (GfK)	48
Greece (IFPI)	39
Hungary (Rádiós Top 40)	37
Ireland (IRMA)	21
Italy (FIMI)	2
Italy (Musica e dischi)	2
Netherlands (Single Top 100)	94
New Zealand (Recorded Music NZ)	30
Scottish Singles Sales (Official Charts)	4
Spain (Promusicae)	9
Switzerland (Schweizer Hitparade)	51
UK Singles (Official Charts)	4
UK Airplay (Music Week)	13

=== Year-end charts ===
Chart (2005)	Position
Italy (FIMI)	30
UK Singles (OCC)	50

== Certifications and sales ==
Region	Certification	Certified units/sales
Italy	—	10,000
