= After All This Time (Simon Webbe song) =

2006 single by Simon Webbe

Single by Simon Webbe

from the album Sanctuary
- B-side: "No Pressure on You"; "Take Me as I Am"
- Released: 20 February 2006
- Length: 3:48
- Label: Innocent
- Songwriters: Simon Webbe; Matt Prime; Tim Woodcock
- Producer: Matt Prime

Simon Webbe singles chronology
"No Worries" (2005)	"After All This Time" (2006)	"Coming Around Again" (2006)

"After All This Time" was the third and final single released from Blue band-member Simon Webbe's debut solo album, Sanctuary. The song failed to become Webbe's third top-five single, peaking at number 16 on the UK Singles Chart.

== Track listings ==
UK CD1

1. "After All This Time"
2. "No Worries" (Lovestar Remix)

UK CD2

1. "After All This Time"
2. "No Pressure on You"
3. "Take Me as I Am"

UK DVD single

1. "After All This Time" (video)
2. Behind the scenes at video shoot
3. Photo gallery featuring "No Worries" (Breakdown Mix)

== Charts ==
Chart (2006)	Peak position
Ireland (IRMA)	42
Italy (FIMI)	47
Netherlands (Single Top 100)	52
Spain (Promusicae)	17
Switzerland (Schweizer Hitparade)	53
UK Singles (Official Charts)	16
UK Airplay (Music Week)	19
