= Simon Webbe =

British singer

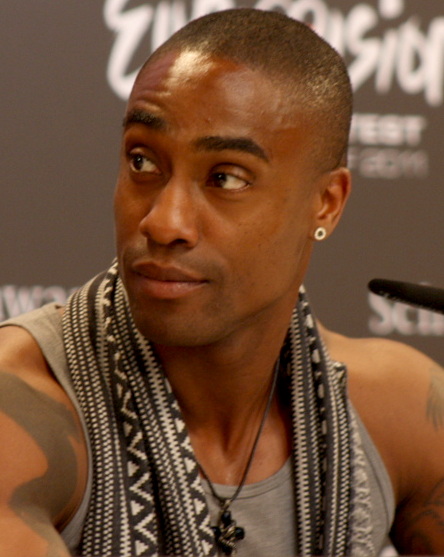
- Webbe in 2011

Background information
- Born: Simon Solomon Webbe; 30 March 1978 (age 48)
- Origin: Moss Side, Manchester, England
- Genres: Pop; R&B; hip hop
- Occupations: Singer; rapper; actor
- Years active: 2000–present
- Label: Innocent Records
- Member of: Blue

Simon Solomon Webbe (born 30 March 1978) is an English singer, rapper and actor. He is a member of the boy band Blue and has also released three solo studio albums, in 2005, 2006 and 2017, and had five UK Top 40 singles.

== History ==
Webbe was born on 30 March 1978. His parents are of Saint Kitts and Nevis descent.

=== 2001–2005: Early career and Blue ===
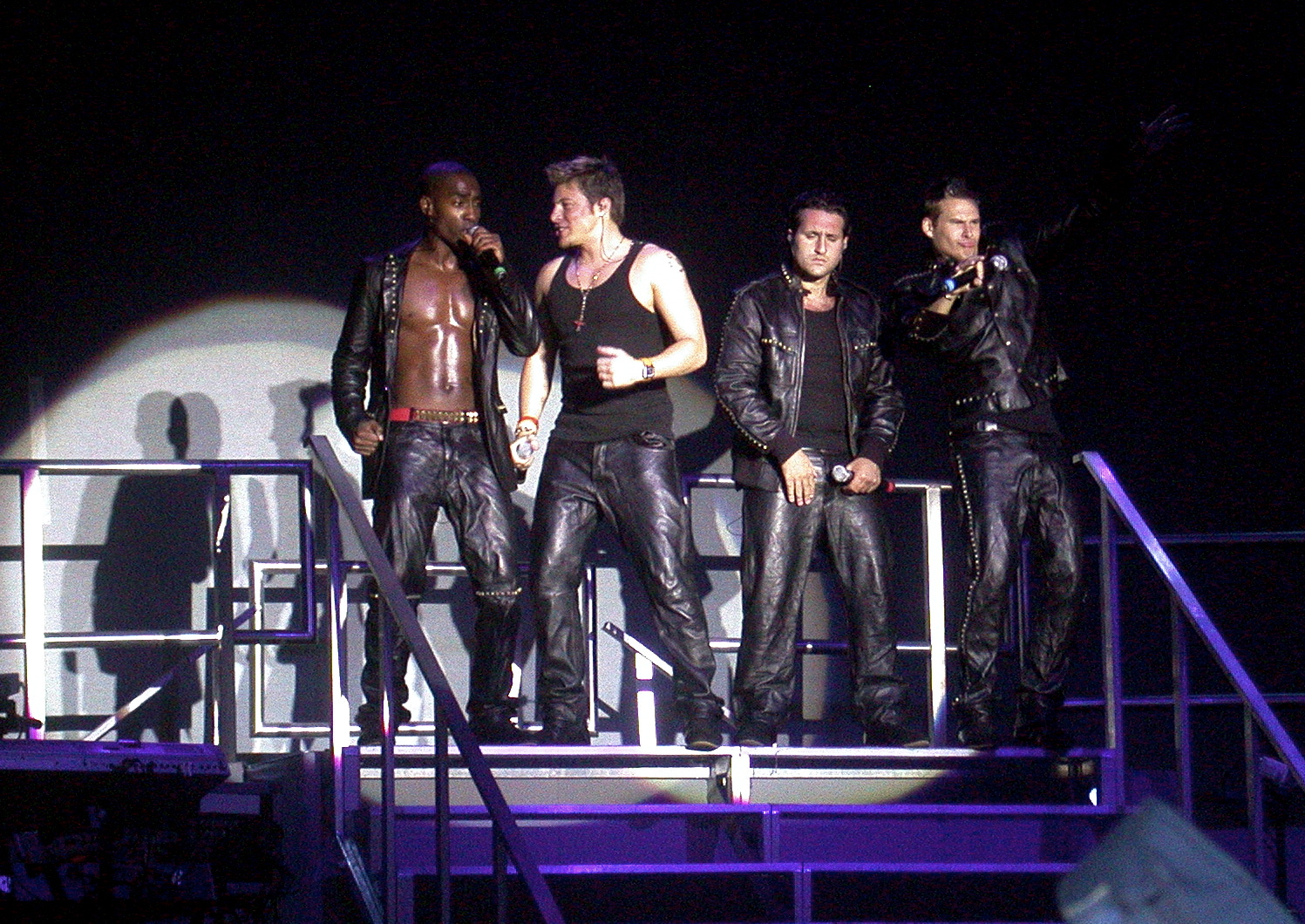
Blue performing on tour in 2005

The band released their debut single "All Rise" in May 2001 and it reached number 4 in the UK Singles Chart. Blue's second single was released in August with the chart-topping "Too Close", a cover version of Next's US number 1 hit produced by Ray Ruffin. Their second number one came in November with "If You Come Back" also produced by Ray Ruffin and co-written by Nicole Anderson aka Nicole Formescu, Lee Brennan, Ian Hope and Ray Ruffin off the album All Rise, which was released in time for Christmas and reached number one, eventually selling in excess of about 1.8 million albums sold in the UK. Blue reached number six in March 2002 with their fourth single, "Fly By II" – a remix of album track "Fly By", which also went to number 30 in Portugal.

Their second studio album One Love was released in 2002. The album entered at UK number 1, where it stayed for one week. Three singles were released from the album: "One Love" (UK number 3), "Sorry Seems to Be the Hardest Word" featuring Elton John (UK number 1), and "U Make Me Wanna" (UK number 4). The group also performed the song "Flexin'" at the 2003 MTV Asia Awards with the Philippines' singer Kyla.

Guilty (the album and the single [UK number 2]) was released in late 2003. The next singles were "Signed, Sealed, Delivered, I'm Yours" (sung with Stevie Wonder and Angie Stone) (UK number 11), "Breathe Easy" (UK number 4), and "Bubblin'" (UK number 9). The album Guilty sold more than one million copies in the UK.

The band decided to split after Elton John suggested that their popularity was decreasing and that they should concentrate on their solo careers. Best of Blue greatest hits compilation was released in 2004, which contained all-time hits including new tracks such as "Curtain Falls", "Get Down on It" and "Only Words I Know". The album was No.2 on charts in Portugal with a double platinum certification.

=== 2005–2006: Sanctuary ===
Webbe launched his post-Blue career on 22 August 2005 with his first solo single "Lay Your Hands" which peaked at number 4 on the UK Singles Chart. His follow-up single "No Worries" reached No.4 in the UK, making him the only Blue member to have multiple Top 10 singles. After the release of two singles, Webbe released his debut solo album Sanctuary which debuted at number 28 on the UK Albums Chart. Despite its relatively low debut it eventually reached number 7 on the chart and has now gone double platinum. The third single from Sanctuary, "After All This Time" was released in February 2006, but it failed to do as well as his previous releases and peaked at number 16.

=== 2006–2007: Grace and "Run" ===
On 30 October 2006, came the first single from Webbe's new album "Coming Around Again". When released it reached number 12 in the UK Singles Chart. His second album Grace was released on 13 November 2006, and peaked at number 11 in the UK Albums Chart. The second single "My Soul Pleads for You" was released on 19 February 2007, and reached 45 on the singles chart. On 21 May 2007, Webbe launched his first tour to support his second album Grace. The tour consisted of 18 dates through May and June, starting in Cambridge and culminating in London. In early June, it was announced that Webbe would be releasing the title track from his second studio album with the theme song from the upcoming film Fantastic Four: Rise of the Silver Surfer. The single was a double A-side release of "Grace"/"Ride the Storm". It reached number 36 in the UK. In Europe, "Seventeen" was released instead of "Grace".

During his 2007 UK Tour, Webbe previewed some songs from his third studio album, including "Run", which he claimed had been announced as the first single. He also claimed that 'Run' could possibly be the title of the album. It is thought that the album was postponed from its 2009 release date due to the reunion of Blue, and that it will be released at some point in the future.

=== 2008–2016: Blue reunion, Eurovision Song Contest and Television ===
Since entering the music industry Webbe has extended his range of business ventures. His two most notable companies are Love 4 Music and Love 4 PR, both of which he co-runs with Jade Reuben. He managed the group VS who supported Blue on their tour. They were also signed to Innocent Records, the same label as Blue, and released three singles, "Love You Like Mad" (#7), "Call U Sexy" (#11) and "Make It Hot" (#29), plus an album, All Kinds of Trouble. The band has since broken up and member Marvin Humes went on to be part of boyband JLS. He also managed North London rapper MR BLARNY who was the only other act (after VS) to sign to Webbe's LOVE 4 Music label. Later Webbe managed American/British girlband L.A.D.E., whose video for their unreleased single "Shake It Off" featured Webbe and Blue bandmate Duncan James. In return the girls appeared in Blue's single "Bubblin'" with MR BLARNY also featuring on the remixes. The British rapper is still recording music releasing "YOUR BEST TIME" in 2013 (featuring LOLA) while the current professional music status of the girls is unknown. Also in 2004, Webbe was voted Company magazine's 62nd Sexiest Man Alive and appeared as a striker on Sky 1's The Match.

In 2008, he participated in British reality television show, I'm a Celebrity...Get Me Out of Here! in which he finished in fifth place. On 28 April 2009, Blue announced that they had reformed and will return to the stage with a new album coming soon. Webbe featured on Ras Kwame's Spit TV rapping with fellow Manchester hip-hop artists Lyrican and Hoodman.

From 31 May to 28 August 2010, Webbe played the role of Curtis Shank in Sister Act the musical at the London Palladium. During his run, Webbe starred alongside Sheila Hancock and Whoopi Goldberg.

Webbe was a guest on Big Brother 11 in August 2010, singing a new track to the housemates.

Blue represented the United Kingdom in the Eurovision Song Contest 2011 in Germany. The group finished 11th in the competition.

On 23 November 2011, it was announced that Webbe would be taking part in the Strictly Come Dancing Christmas Special. Webbe was the first celebrity to compete (dancing the Cha Cha Cha to "Merry Christmas Everybody") – supported in the audience by fellow Blue bandmates Duncan James and Antony Costa. His celebrity partner was Katya Virshilas. The judges placed Webbe in joint third – with a score of 36 out of 40. The Strictly Come Dancing Christmas Special was broadcast on BBC One on 25 December 2011.

On 21 August 2014, Webbe was confirmed on ITV's Good Morning Britain as a contestant on the upcoming twelfth series of Strictly Come Dancing. He was partnered with professional dancer Kristina Rihanoff for the series and the pair were declared runners-up on 20 December.

In August 2015, he appeared in George Stiles and Anthony Drewe's family musical The 3 Little Pigs at the Palace Theatre, London. He played the Big Bad Wolf.

In 2016, he joined the cast of the BBC Scotland soap opera River City as Andy Cousins.

=== 2017–present: Smile and Blue 20th Anniversary ===
On 28 July 2017, Webbe announced the release of his third studio album Smile due for release on 13 October 2017.

On 30 November 2021 the group confirmed they would be going on an arena tour to celebrate their 20th anniversary, it was also confirmed that Atomic Kitten would be supporting them on the tour. When interviewed on This Morning the group also confirmed that they were back in the studio recording, a new album is expected to follow along with the tour.

On 11 April 2022 the group announced that their sixth studio album Heart & Soul which would be released on 9 September 2022. On 20 May the group unveiled the track listing for the album on their social media accounts, following with first single "Haven't Found You Yet". On 29 June 2022, the group released the single "Dance with Me", a cover of the 2001 112 single.

== Personal life ==
Webbe has a daughter, Alanah (born 1996), with ex-partner Nicola Jones, a shop assistant from Solihull. She is the inspiration for his 2007 single "Grace".

He is a distant cousin of the Sugababes singer Keisha Buchanan and his brother Duane Bryan was a contestant on the 2012 series of The Apprentice.

Webbe is also related to former Labour Party politician Claudia Webbe.

Webbe is an lifelong supporter of Premier League football club Manchester United.

== Discography ==
=== Studio albums ===
- Sanctuary (2005)
- Grace (2006)
- Smile (2017)

== Filmography ==
=== Films ===
Year	Title	Role
2004	The Truth About Love	Dan Harlow
2006	Rollin' with the Nines	Too Fine
2011	Everywhere and Nowhere	Ronnie

=== Television ===
Year	Title	Role	Notes
2007	Tatort	Rick	Episode: "Schwelbrand"
2008	I'm a Celebrity...Get Me Out of Here!	Contestant	Series 8
2014	Strictly Come Dancing	Contestant	Series 12
2016	River City	Andy Cousins	
