= Redemption Days =

Single by Josh Osho featuring Ghostface Killah

from the album L.I.F.E
- Released: 4 September 2011
- Recorded: 2011
- Genre: R&B, hip hop
- Length: 3:35
- Label: Island
- Songwriters: Josh Osho, Tim Woodcock, Matt Prime
- Producer: RZA

Josh Osho featuring Ghostface Killah singles chronology
"Redemption Days" (2011)	"Giants" (2012)

"Redemption Days" is a song by singer-songwriter Josh Osho. It was released as the first single from his debut studio album, L.I.F.E, on 4 September 2011. The single version features Wu-Tang Clan rapper Ghostface Killah. The album version features only vocals by Osho himself. The single has so far peaked at number 89 on the UK Singles Chart. The song includes a sample from "Lucky Man" by The Verve.

== Background ==
After signing to Island Records in mid-2011, Osho released "Redemption Days" as his debut single. In May 2012, "Redemption Days" become noticed by mainstream media after Osho performed the track on Later... with Jools Holland. The track became Record of the Week on BBC Radio 1, BBC Radio 2 and BBC Radio 1Xtra as well as being added to the B List of all three major stations.

The song has been used in numerous television shows such as The Voice UK, Big Brother and The X Factor. The song serves as the soundtrack to ITV's UEFA Euro 2012 coverage, British Eurosport's 2012 Tour de France coverage, the theme song to BP's advertising campaign for the 2012 Summer Olympics and features on the soundtrack of the British film Victim (2011).

== Music video ==
A music video to accompany "Redemption Days" was first released onto YouTube on 11 May 2011 at a total length of three minutes and fifty-one seconds. The video opened to very small numbers but by September 2012 it had accumulated over 500,000 views.

== Track listing ==
Digital download
No.	Title	Length
1.	"Redemption Days" (Feat. Ghostface Killah) (Radio Edit)	3:35
2.	"Redemption Days" (RZA Remix)	4:52
3.	"Redemption Days" (Distance Remix)	5:11
4.	"Redemption Days" (Roni Size Remx)	4:52
5.	"Redemption Days" (Music Video)	3:51

== Chart performance ==
Chart (2012)	Peak position
UK Singles (Official Charts)	89

== Release history ==
Region	Date	Format	Label
United Kingdom	4 September 2011	Digital download	Island Records

== Covers ==
In June 2015, Patrick James Donoghue, winner of series 4 of The Voice of Ireland released a cover of the song as his debut single after his win using the name Patrick James.
