= Coming Around Again (Simon Webbe song) =

Single by Simon Webbe

from the album Grace
- B-side: "Whatever Gets You Through the Night", "Rain"
- Released: 30 October 2006
- Length: 3:44
- Label: Innocent, EMI
- Songwriters: Simon Webbe, Matt Prime, Tim Woodcock
- Producer: Matt Prime

Simon Webbe singles chronology
"After All This Time" (2006)	"Coming Around Again" (2006)	"My Soul Pleads for You" (2007)

"Coming Around Again" is the first single released from British singer Simon Webbe's second solo studio album, Grace. The single was released on 30 October 2006, performing the song live on BBC One's reality-dancing series Strictly Come Dancing the following week. The song entered the charts at number 50 based on digital sales only, and upon its physical release, climbed to a peak position of number 12 on the UK Singles Chart. It also peaked at number seven in the Netherlands and entered the top 20 in Italy and Spain.

== Track listings ==
UK CD1

1. "Coming Around Again" – 3:41
2. "No Worries" (Breakdown mix) – 3:17

UK CD2

1. "Coming Around Again" – 3:41
2. "Whatever Gets You Through the Night" – 3:53
3. "Rain" – 4:00
4. "Coming Around Again" (video) – 3:41

== Charts ==
=== Weekly charts ===
Weekly chart performance for "Coming Around Again"
Chart (2006–2007)	Peak position
Austria (Ö3 Austria Top 40)	46
Germany (GfK)	36
Netherlands (Dutch Top 40)	11
Netherlands (Single Top 100)	7
Italy (FIMI)	15
Italy (Musica e dischi)	17
Romania (Romanian Top 100)	25
Spain (Promusicae)	17
Switzerland (Schweizer Hitparade)	36
UK Singles (Official Charts)	12
UK Airplay (Music Week)	6

=== Year-end charts ===
2006 year-end chart rankings for "Coming Around Again"
Chart (2006)	Position
Netherlands (Dutch Top 40)	163
UK Singles (OCC)	195

2007 year-end chart rankings for "Coming Around Again"
Chart (2007)	Position
Netherlands (Dutch Top 40)	116
