= Eliza Doolittle (singer) =

British singer (born 1988)

Eliza
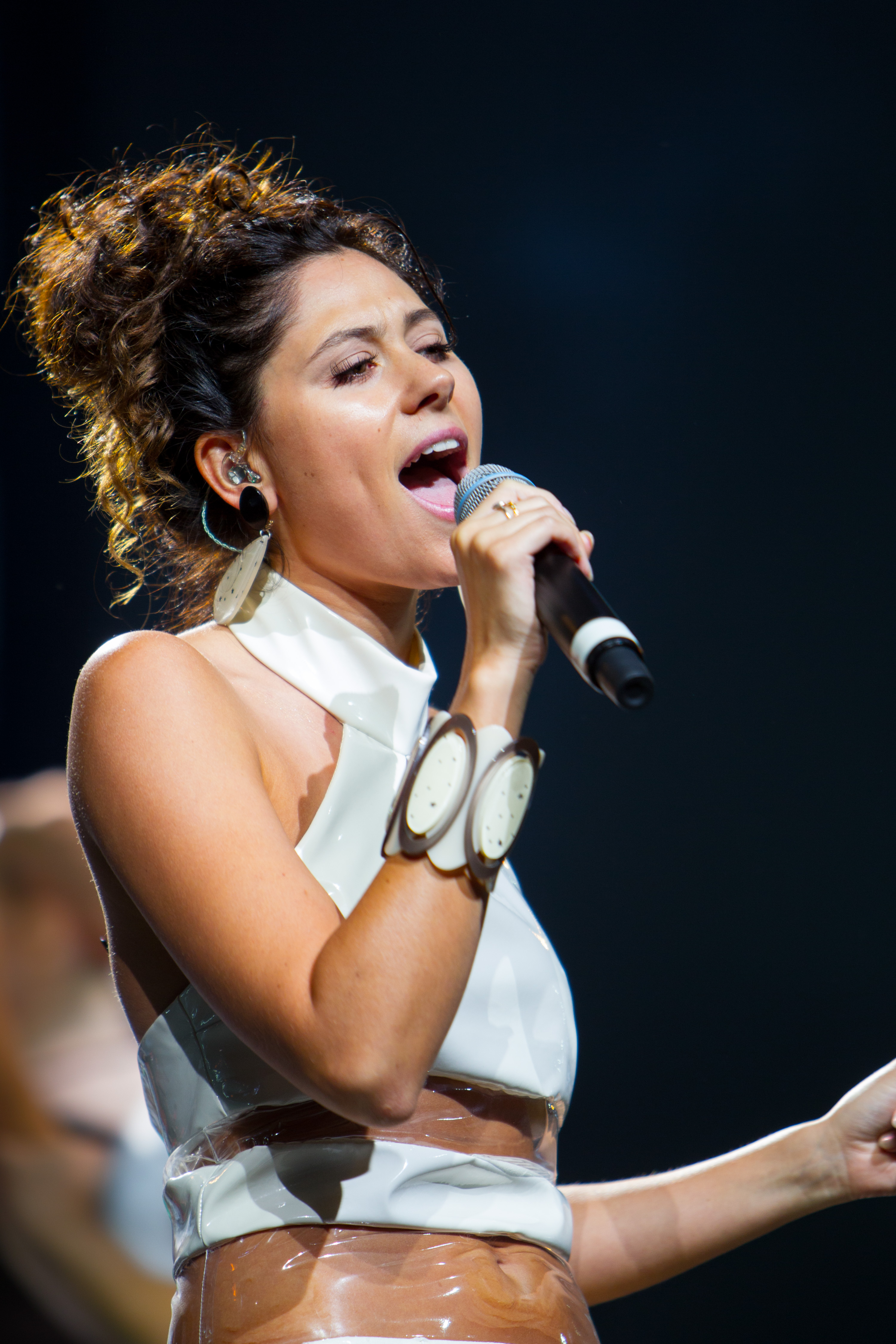
- Eliza performing in 2014

Background information
- Born: Eliza Sophie Caird; 15 April 1988 (age 38); Westminster, London, England
- Occupations: Singer; songwriter
- Instruments: Vocals; piano
- Years active: 2000s–present
- Label: Parlophone

Eliza Sophie Caird (born 15 April 1988), better known by her former stage name Eliza Doolittle and now by the mononym Eliza, is an English singer and songwriter from Westminster, London. After performing her music in live venues around London from the age of 15, Eliza signed to Parlophone in 2008.

Her eponymous debut album was released on 12 July 2010 and went platinum. The album produced two UK top-40 hits, "Skinny Genes" and "Pack Up", the latter of which peaked within the top five on the UK Singles Chart.

In 2013, Eliza contributed writing and vocals to "You & Me", a single from British electronic music duo Disclosure's number one debut album Settle.

On 7 June 2013, she premiered a single called "Big When I Was Little", which was released in July 2013. It subsequently joined BBC Radio 1's and Radio 2 playlist. It was later included on her second studio album, titled In Your Hands.

In 2018, Eliza released the album A Real Romantic, which included tracks like "Wasn't Looking", "Livid" and "Alone & Unafraid". In 2022, she released the album A Sky Without Stars, which included tracks like "Straight Talker", "Heat of the Moon" and "Everywhere I'll Ever Be".

== Early life ==
Eliza was born in Westminster, London. She comes from a family with a successful and varied musical background. Her father is John Caird, a stage director and writer of plays, musicals and operas who is also an honorary associate director of the Royal Shakespeare Company.

Her paternal grandfather G. B. Caird, was the theologian and principal of Mansfield College, Oxford. Her mother is musical theatre actress and artist Frances Ruffelle, who won a Tony Award for her role of Éponine in the English-language version of Les Misérables and represented the United Kingdom in the 1994 Eurovision Song Contest. Eliza is the granddaughter of Sylvia Young, founder of the eponymous theatre school. She is one of nine siblings. Her parents divorced when she was four years old.

Eliza had a brief career on stage playing Young Cosette in Les Misérables in London's West End in 1996–1997. Her parents had met and began their relationship during the original production, when her father was the co-director and her mother played Eponine. Eliza went on to play the lead role in Lucy Simon's Tony Award-winning musical version of The Secret Garden in 2001 when the Royal Shakespeare Company premiered the show in London.

== Musical career ==
=== Career beginnings ===
Before entering the charts, Eliza toured the UK with her band. She released an EP including songs "Naive" produced by Al Shux ("A New York State of Mind"), "Ego" and "Piano Song" produced by Truth & Soul (Lee Fields, El Michels Affair). On 29 November 2009, a further EP release featuring the tracks "Rollerblades", "Moneybox", "Police Car", and "Go Home" (produced by Craigie Dodds, Johnny Dollar, Matt Prime and Phil Thornaley). Tracks from the EP were remixed by Plastic Little ("Rollerblades"), Sam Young and Jamie xx from The xx ("Money Box"). The EP received radio plays from Rob Da Bank, Nick Grimshaw, Fearne Cotton, and Jo Whiley.

She recorded the song "Running For Life", which was featured on the soundtrack of the 2008 cult British film Adulthood. Later that year, she performed at Glastonbury on the Pussy Parlour stage, her first festival performance.

=== 2010–2013: Eliza Doolittle ===
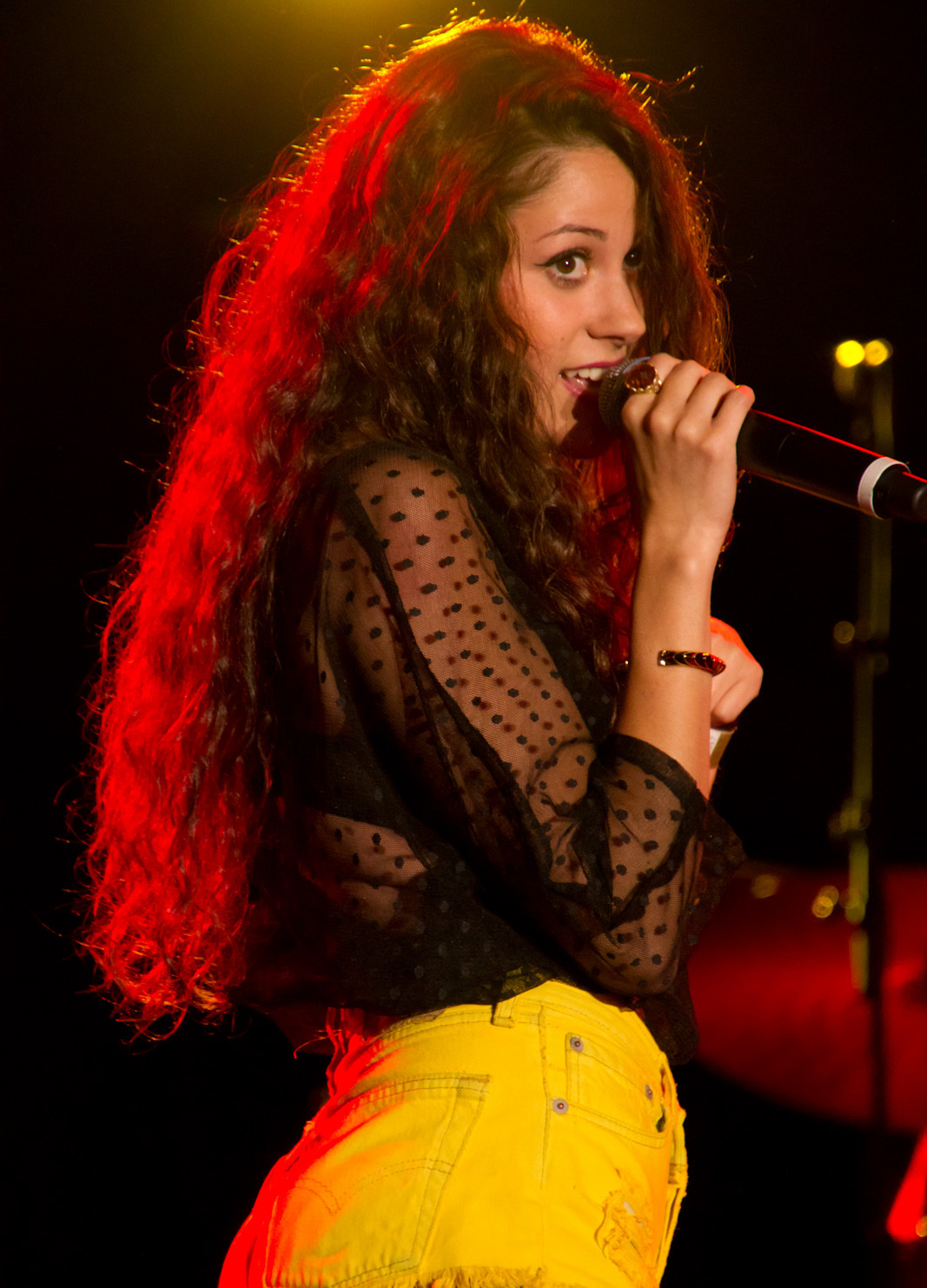
Eliza at Skyfest, 2011

In early 2010, she took part in musician Shane MacGowan's charity single "I Put a Spell on You", in aid of the 2010 Haiti earthquake. Her debut single "Skinny Genes" was released on 12 April 2010, reaching No. 22 in the UK Singles Chart. She told BBC's Steve Lamacq the song is "a funny scenario if you didn't like someone, if they were really annoying, but you had a good time under the sheets." Eliza's second release "Pack Up" was released on 5 July 2010, reaching No. 5 on the Official UK Singles Chart on 11 July 2010.

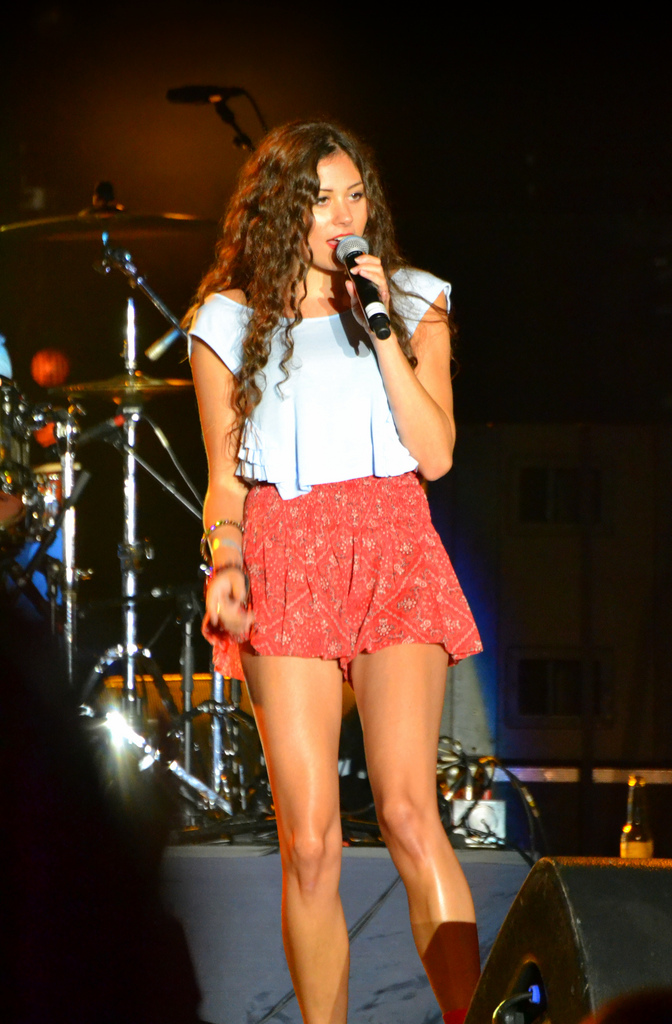
Eliza in August 2011 performing at SkyFest

In March 2011, she performed at the South by Southwest festival in Austin, Texas as well at Coachella in California. In April 2011, Eliza was touring the UK. On 19 April 2011, Eliza's self-titled album was released in the United States almost one year from the UK date.

In 2013, Eliza collaborated with Disclosure on the track "You & Me" from their debut album, Settle. Early that year, she began recording new material for her second album. In an interview with Elle magazine in April 2013, she stated "I'm definitely showing more of myself than I ever have before. I feel like on my last album, I hadn't experienced very much of anything really, and it's been three years or more since then and I have felt and seen things I hadn't before, and I know things I didn't know before. In a way I have answers to questions, but then those answers open up a thousand other questions. I guess I've gone through things that so many people go through at the age I am. I've written almost every day about my every thought and emotion and the album is made up of the songs that mean the most to me".

=== 2013–2016: In Your Hands ===
On 7 June 2013, she premiered a new single called "Big When I Was Little", which was released in July 2013. It subsequently joined BBC Radio 1's playlist, and features on her second studio album. On 17 June 2013 the video for the single premiered on her YouTube channel.

Eliza and UK garage artist Wookie wrote a song called "The Hype" in 2013. Wookie contributed a remix to her album In Your Hands for her track "Walking on Water".

She featured on "YNSP", a track from hip hop artist Vic Mensa's Innanetape mixtape produced by DJ Dahi.

She had a cameo role as a nightclub singer in The Great Train Robbery, a drama series on BBC One in December 2013.

In 2014, Eliza was invited by Burt Bacharach to sing with him at Henley Festival in the summer of 2014.

=== 2016: Rebrand, A Real Romantic and A Sky Without Stars ===
In 2017, she rebranded her name from Eliza Doolittle to Eliza and changed her sound. On 12 December 2018, her album A Real Romantic was released. In 2022, Eliza released a couple of new singles ("Straight Talker" and "Heat of the Moon") after signing to [PIAS]'s Different Recordings and a new album, A Sky Without Stars, was announced.

A Sky without Stars received praise and acclaim from reviewers. Dom Taylor of R&B website The Pit wrote that the album "let the music lead" and "can be boiled down to an irreplaceable feeling of soul. The foot-tapping, transformative, time-loses-all-meaning kind of soul." Haste magazine's Becca Hemens summarised a live performance by Eliza following the release of the album as "An enigmatic and sensual performance for an album of melodic reinvention and feminine power" and was struck by the "aura of mystique" in Eliza's performance.

== Discography ==
=== Studio albums ===
| Title | Album details | Chart peak positions | | | | | | | Certifications (sales thresholds) |
| Title | Album details | UK | BEL (Fl) | BEL (Wa) | DEN | FRA | IRE | NL | Certifications (sales thresholds) |
|---|---|---|---|---|---|---|---|---|---|
| Eliza Doolittle | Released: 12 July 2010; Label: Parlophone; Formats: Digital download, CD | 3 | 46 | 100 | 38 | 101 | 10 | 45 | BPI: Platinum |
| In Your Hands | Released: 14 October 2013; Label: Parlophone; Formats: Digital download, CD | 25 | — | — | — | — | 71 | — | |
| A Real Romantic | Released: 12 December 2018; Label: Eliza; Formats: Digital download, streaming | — | — | — | — | — | — | — | |
| A Sky Without Stars | Released: 16 September 2022; Label: Different Recordings, [PIAS] Recordings; Formats: Digital download, CD, LP | — | — | — | — | — | — | — | |
"—" denotes album that did not chart or was not released.

=== Extended plays ===
| Title | EP details |
|---|---|
| Eliza Doolittle | Released: 29 November 2009; Formats: Digital download |
| Xmas In Bed (Note: Free download including "The Gift of Giving", "Xmas in Bed" and "Last Christmas".) | Released: December 2013; Formats: Digital download |

=== Singles ===
==== As lead artist ====
List of singles as lead artist
| Title | Year | Peak chart positions | | | | | | | | | Certifications (sales thresholds) | Album |
| Title | Year | UK | AUS | BEL | DEN | FIN | GER | IRE | NLD | SWI | Certifications (sales thresholds) | Album |
|---|---|---|---|---|---|---|---|---|---|---|---|---|
| "Skinny Genes" | 2010 | 22 | — | 42 | — | — | 42 | 42 | 90 | 48 | BPI: Silver | Eliza Doolittle |
| "Pack Up" | 2010 | 5 | 96 | 10 | 37 | 16 | 49 | 6 | 8 | 75 | BPI: Platinum | Eliza Doolittle |
| "Rollerblades" | 2010 | 58 | — | 61 | — | — | — | — | — | — | | Eliza Doolittle |
| "Mr Medicine" | 2011 | 130 | — | — | — | — | — | — | — | — | | Eliza Doolittle |
| "Big When I Was Little" | 2013 | 12 | — | 77 | — | — | — | — | — | — | | In Your Hands |
| "Let It Rain" | 2013 | 55 | — | — | — | — | — | — | — | — | | In Your Hands |
| "Walking On Water" | 2013 | — | — | — | — | — | — | — | — | — | | In Your Hands |
| "Wide Eyed Fool" | 2017 | — | — | — | — | — | — | — | — | — | | A Real Romantic |
| "Wasn't Looking" | 2017 | — | — | — | — | — | — | — | — | — | | A Real Romantic |
| "Livid" | 2018 | — | — | — | — | — | — | — | — | — | | A Real Romantic |
| "Alone & Unafraid" | 2018 | — | — | — | — | — | — | — | — | — | | A Real Romantic |
| "All Night" | 2018 | — | — | — | — | — | — | — | — | — | | A Real Romantic |
| "Straight Talker" | 2022 | — | — | — | — | — | — | — | — | — | | A Sky Without Stars |
| "Heat of the Moon" | 2022 | — | — | — | — | — | — | — | — | — | | A Sky Without Stars |
| "Everywhere I'll Ever Be" | 2022 | — | — | — | — | — | — | — | — | — | | A Sky Without Stars |
| "Anyone Else" | 2025 | — | — | — | — | — | — | — | — | — | | |
"—" denotes single that did not chart or was not released.

==== Promotional singles ====
List of promotional singles
| Title | Year | Peak chart positions | Album |
| Title | Year | BEL | Album |
|---|---|---|---|
| "Walking on Water" | 2013 | 64 | In Your Hands |
| "Big City" | 2015 | — | Shaun the Sheep Movie |
| "Alone & Unafraid" | 2018 | — | A Real Romantic |
"—" denotes single that did not chart or was not released.

==== As featured artist ====
Appearances performing as a featured artist on others' works
| Title | Year | Peak chart positions | | | | | | | | | | Certifications | Album |
| Title | Year | UK | AUT | BEL | FRA | GER | IRE | SPN | NLD | SCO | SWI | Certifications | Album |
|---|---|---|---|---|---|---|---|---|---|---|---|---|---|
| "He Ain't Heavy, He's My Brother" (as part of The Justice Collective) | 2012 | 1 | — | — | — | — | 4 | — | — | — | — | | Charity single |
| "You & Me" (Disclosure featuring Eliza Doolittle) | 2013 | 10 | 62 | 41 | 2 | 88 | 84 | 59 | 30 | 27 | 56 | BPI: 3× Platinum; ARIA: 3× Platinum | Settle |
| "The Hype" (Wookie featuring Eliza Doolittle) | 2013 | — | — | — | — | — | — | — | — | — | — | | Non-album single |
"—" denotes single that did not chart or was not released.

=== Music videos ===
Videos for Eliza's music
| Title | Year | Director |
|---|---|---|
| "Piano Song" | 2008 | — |
| "Skinny Genes" | 2010 | — |
| "Skinny Genes 2.0" | 2010 | — |
| "Pack Up" | 2010 | — |
| "Rollerblades" | 2010 | — |
| "He Ain't Heavy, He's My Brother" (As part of The Justice Collective) | 2010 | — |
| "Mr. Medicine" | 2011 | — |
| "Big When I Was Little" | 2013 | — |
| "Let It Rain" | 2013 | — |
| "Waste of Time" | 2013 | — |
| "You & Me" (Disclosure featuring Eliza Doolittle) | 2013 | — |
| "The Hype" (Wookie featuring Eliza Doolittle) | 2013 | — |
| "Walking on Water" | 2013 | — |
| "In Your Hands" | 2014 | — |
| "Wide Eyed Fool" | 2017 | Charlie Robins |
| "Wasn't Looking" | 2017 | — |
| "Livid" | 2018 | Eliza |
| "Alone & Unafraid" | 2018 | Charlie Robins |
| "Straight Talker" | 2022 | Charlie Robins |
| "Heat of the Moon" | 2022 | Charlie Robins |
| "Everywhere I'll Ever Be" | 2022 | Charlie Robins |

== Filmography ==
Television
| Year | Title | Role | Notes |
|---|---|---|---|
| 2013 | The Great Train Robbery | Nightclub Singer | Episode: "A Robber's Tale" |
| 2014 | Home and Away | Herself | Episode #1.5932 |

== Personal life ==
In 2024, she gave birth to her first child with her partner, film director Charlie Robins.
