= No Worries (Simon Webbe song) =

2005 single by Simon Webbe

Single by Simon Webbe

from the album Sanctuary
- B-side: "Give a Man Hope"; "I Ain't You"
- Released: 7 November 2005
- Length: 3:29
- Label: Innocent
- Songwriters: Simon Webbe; Matt Prime; Tim Woodcock
- Producer: Matt Prime

Simon Webbe singles chronology
"Lay Your Hands" (2005)	"No Worries" (2005)	"After All This Time" (2006)

"No Worries" is the second single released from Blue band member Simon Webbe's debut solo album, Sanctuary (2005). The song features backing vocals from Liam Kennedy and Yvonne John Lewis. "No Worries" peaked at number four on the UK Singles Chart, the same position as its predecessor, "Lay Your Hands", but spent longer in the top 40. The song became a top-20 hit in Italy and reached number two in the Netherlands.

== Track listings ==
UK CD1

1. "No Worries"
2. "Lay Your Hands" (Stargate remix)

UK CD2

1. "No Worries"
2. "Give a Man Hope"
3. "I Ain't You"

UK DVD single

1. "No Worries" (video—the director's cut)
2. Photo gallery featuring "Give A Man Hope"
3. Behind the scenes at photophoot / "No Worries" (instrumental)

== Charts ==
=== Weekly charts ===
Chart (2005–2006)	Peak position
Austria (Ö3 Austria Top 40)	49
Europe (Eurochart Hot 100)	15
Germany (GfK)	59
Hungary (Rádiós Top 40)	4
Ireland (IRMA)	30
Italy (FIMI)	11
Italy (Musica e dischi)	15
Netherlands (Dutch Top 40)	2
Netherlands (Single Top 100)	3
Switzerland (Schweizer Hitparade)	27
UK Singles (Official Charts)	4
UK Airplay (Music Week)	4

=== Year-end charts ===
Chart (2005)	Position
UK Singles (OCC)	43

Chart (2006)	Position
Hungary (Rádiós Top 40)	25
Netherlands (Dutch Top 40)	5
Netherlands (Single Top 100)	19
UK Singles (OCC)	168
UK Airplay (Music Week)	71
