= Reflections (Blue album) =

Studio album by Blue
- Released: 9 January 2026
- Length: 40:31
- Labels: Blue Blood; Cooking Vinyl
- Producers: GoldCrush; N3RD; Jarrad Rogers; Lee Ryan; Tim Woodcock; Johnny Wright

Blue chronology
Heart & Soul (2022)	Reflections (2026)

Singles from Reflections
- 1. "One Last Time" Released: 4 September 2025; 2. "Waste My Love" Released: 30 October 2025; 3. "Beautiful Spiritual" Released: 28 November 2025; 4. "Candlelight Fades" Released: 19 December 2025; 5. "You Should Know" Released: 23 September 2026

Reflections is the seventh studio album by English boy band Blue. It was released on 9 January 2026 through Blue Blood International and Cooking Vinyl. Their first album since 2022's Heart & Soul, the project was set up to mark the band's 25th anniversary. Reflections features contributions from all four members in songwriting and combines new material with elements of the group's earlier sound, including guitar-driven tracks, ballads, and R&B influences. Production was largely handled by Hugh Goldsmith and Paul Visser of GoldCrush, who contributed to around two-thirds of the album.

Critics gave Reflections a mixed reception, praising Blue's harmonies, songwriting, and emotional focus, while also noting its heavy reliance on nostalgia and limited musical progression, with some describing it as formulaic or overly familiar. On charts, Reflections debuted at number 2 on the UK Albums Chart, becoming the band's highest-charting studio album since 2003's Guilty, and marked their first chart topper in Scotland. The album produced four singles. Promotion was further supported by the band's 25th Anniversary Tour, which began in November 2025.

== Background ==
After years of solo projects and no intention to record new material together, Blue reunited in early 2020 to write new music. Although the band had no plan to craft a full body of work, the sessions produced five finished songs. Encouraged by the results, the group continued recording, and although another studio album was not initially planned, their reunion with their former producer and A&R manager Hugh Goldsmith led to the creation of a new Blue album, their first since 2015's Colours. Issued in October 2022, Heart & Soul debuted at number 22 on the UK Albums Chart, becoming Blue's lowest-charting album to date.

Following the release of Heart & Soul, the group was initially hesitant to record new music, feeling unsure about the direction and wary of criticism if the band, now in their 40s, would attempt another comeback. They eventually proceeded with recording, drawing on personal and professional experiences, including financial challenges, loss, and raising families, resulting in a new album to coincide with their 25th anniversary as a band. In discussing Reflections, Blue noted that the album combines classic material with new songs and incorporates a variety of influences. As a four-member band with all members contributing to the songwriting, the group described the album as containing guitar-driven tracks, large ballads, and R&B, while maintaining the signature Blue sound.

== Promotion ==
Reflections was preceded by four singles released between September and December 2025. "One Last Time", co-written by band member Duncan James, was released as the album's first single on 4 September 2025. with a music video directed by Matt Evers following on 14 September. The song debuted and peaked at number 62 on the UK Singles Downloads Chart. A second single, "Waste My Love", co-written by Simon Webbe, was issued on 30 October 2025 alongside a visualiser featuring archive footage, particularly drawn from the band's early career. It was followed by "Beautiful Spiritual", co-written by Lee Ryan, which was released as the album's third single on 27 November 2025. A fourth single to precede Reflections, "Candlelight Fades", co-written by Antony Costa, was released on 19 December 2025, accompanied by a black-and-white visualiser showing the band performing behind microphone stands. A fifth and final single, "You Should Know", was released on 23 September 2026 alongside a music video.

== Critical reception ==
Professional ratings
Review scores
Source	Rating
The Guardian	2/5 stars
laut.de	2/5 stars

Reflections received mixed reviews. Prinz editor Else Eberz called Reflections a "versatile body of work the four musicians are clearly proud of. Fans can look forward to a broad sonic palette: from the signature blue R&B sound of "Waste My Love," to heartfelt ballads like "Candlelight Fades," and all the way to the high-energy track "Beautiful Spiritual"." laut.de's Emil Dröll wrote: "What Blue deliver are thirteen variations of the same song, carried by a stubborn refusal to finally leave the old days behind. Reflections is an album for enthusiastic radio listeners and for all those for whom anthems can never be anthemic enough."

Writing for The Times, Will Hodgkinson noted that Blue's later work places them alongside groups such as Take That and Westlife, portraying the band as "middle-aged men traversing the rocky road of adulthood while still clinging onto their youthful glory days". He described Reflections as polished and directed at long-standing fans, emphasising familiarity rather than musical reinvention. Renowned for Sound found Reflections to be "nostalgia bait," praising some of its harmonies but criticising its "2000s boyband" sound as dated and lacking the quality of Blue's earlier work. Similarly, Michael Cragg from The Guardian described the album as a "clunkier approximation of their (comparatively) harder-edged hybrid of pop, hip-hop and R&B; think 2002 "low ride" anthem "Fly By II" but on a Megabus budget." He concluded that "the four-piece try to tap into modern pop's deep well of nostalgia but come off like Westlife on a bad day".

== Commercial performance ==
In the United Kingdom, the album debuted at number two on the UK Albums Chart, becoming the group's highest charting studio album since 2003's Guilty. The album also debuted at number one on the UK Album Downloads Chart, the UK Albums Sales Chart, and the UK Independent Albums Chart, and at number three on the UK Vinyl Albums Chart. Reflections additionally topped the Scottish Albums Chart, becoming the band's first album to reach number one there, and peaked at number 16 in the Flemish region of Belgium.

== Track listing ==
Reflections track listing
No.	Title	Writer(s)	Producer(s)	Length
1.	"The Vow"	Antony Costa; Lee Ryan; Johnny Wright	GoldCrush; Wright; Ryan	3:49
2.	"One Last Time"	Duncan James; Paul Visser	GoldCrush	3:18
3.	"You Should Know"	Simon Webbe; Ryan; Visser	GoldCrush	3:19
4.	"Look What You Started"	Ryan; Visser	GoldCrush	2:49
5.	"Candlelight Fades"	Costa; Visser	GoldCrush	3:14
6.	"The Day the Earth Stood Still"	Costa; Visser	GoldCrush	2:56
7.	"Where I Came From"	Ryan; Rea Garvey	GoldCrush	3:22
8.	"Waste My Love"	Simon Webbe; Haris Alagic; Léon Paul Palmen; Jihad Rahmouni; Sophia Ayana	N3RD	3:13
9.	"All About Us"	Webbe; Visser	N3RD	3:08
10.	"Neon Honey"	James; Visser	GoldCrush	2:40
11.	"Beautiful Spiritual"	Ryan; Jarrad Rogers; Visser	Rogers; GoldCrush
12.	"Souls of the Underground"	Webbe; Visser	N3RD	2:48
13.	"Find That Feeling"	Costa; Tim Woodcock; Steve Rushton	Woodcock	2:59
Total length:				40:31

== Personnel ==
Credits are adapted from the album's liner notes and Tidal.

=== Blue ===
- Antony Costa – vocals
- Duncan James – vocals
- Lee Ryan – vocals
- Simon Webbe – vocals

=== Additional contributors ===
- GoldCrush – mixing (tracks 1, 4–7, 10)
- Ash Howes – mixing (2, 3, 8, 9, 11–13)
- Kevin Tuffy – mastering
- Owen James Vincent – photography
- Tommy Evans – graphic design
- Max Dodson – early photography
- Alex Lodge – front cover design

== Charts ==
Weekly chart performance for Reflections
Chart (2026)	Peak position
Belgian Albums (Ultratop Flanders)	16
Belgian Albums (Ultratop Wallonia)	41
Scottish Albums (Official Charts)	1
Swiss Albums (Schweizer Hitparade)	77
UK Albums (Official Charts)	2
UK Independent Albums (Official Charts)	1

== Release history ==
Reflections release history
Region	Date	Label	Format	Ref.
Various	9 January 2026	Blue Blood International; Cooking Vinyl	CD; cassette; digital; streaming; vinyl	
