= Glatman =

Glatman is a surname. Notable people with the surname include:

- Daniel Glatman (born 1975), English music manager
- Harvey Glatman (1927–1959), American serial killer

== See also ==
- Gladman
