= Colours (Blue album) =

Studio album by Blue
- Released: 6 March 2015
- Recorded: 2014
- Genre: Soul pop
- Length: 35:53
- Label: Sony Music
- Producers: James Jeffrey; Level 3; Paul Meehan; Brian Rawling

Blue chronology
Roulette (2013)	Colours (2015)	Heart & Soul (2022)

Singles from Colours
- 1. "King of the World" Released: 2 March 2015; 2. "Nothing Like You" Released: 10 October 2015

Colours is the fifth studio album by English boy band Blue. It was released on 6 March 2015 and marked the band's first release with Sony Music. Initially conceived as a concept album intended to include only cover versions of the band's personal favorites, the group went on to write a number of original songs during the recording process, which they later also recorded. In the end, six original songs and four cover tracks made it onto the album, including songs originally by Johnny Bristol, Eric Benét, and Rod Stewart.

The album received mixed reviews, with praise for its mature, soulful sound and harmonies, while some critics found it safe and uninspired. Commercially, Colours became Blue's second consecutive album to reach number 13 on the UK Albums Chart. It produced two singles, including lead single "King of the World" and follow-up "Nothing Like You." In April 2015, just weeks after the release, the band was released early from their two-album contract with Sony due to disappointing sales figures.

== Background and production ==
In January 2013, Blue released Roulette, their fourth studio album and first project in ten years through Island Records. The album received positive reviews, with critics praising Blue's vocals and their signature pop/R&B sound, though some noted the band's reliance on nostalgia and safe choices. Commercially, it achieved modest success, reaching the top 20 in both Germany and the United Kingdom, with Roulette's lead single "Hurt Lovers" becoming a top ten hit on the German Singles Chart. Subsequent singles such as "Without You" failed to make a significant impact on the charts. From May to December 2013, in further promotion of the album, Blue embarked on the European Roulette Tour.

The idea for their next album came about during a flight home from the European leg of the tour. Initially set to be a concept album, consisting entirely of covers of songs by artists who inspired the band during their childhoods and early years in the music industry, including the likes of Marvin Gaye, Blue were contacted by producer Brian Rawling who invited them to his private studio in Surrey to record with him. Whilst recording some of the covers which the band had selected, Rawling offered the band the chance to write some original material with several of his well-known contacts, including Paul Barry and Mark Taylor. As a result of this, the band wrote seven original songs and thus it was decided that the album would become a combination of the original material as well as four carefully selected covers. The album was later trimmed to include six of the original songs.

== Promotion ==
The album's lead single "King of the World" premiered on 20 January 2015. In March and April 2015, Blue embarked on the 16-date Colours of Blue Tour, where they performed the entire album live, while also updating some of their back catalogue to include elements of the soul-pop genre which appears on Colours. The tour began with a show in Portsmouth on March 21, and concluded in Leicester on April 9.

== Critical reception ==
Colours received generally positive reviews for its more mature, soulful direction, with Carys Jones from Entertainment Focus describing it as Blue's "most mature sounding album to date," highlighting its "lush harmonies" and warm, soulful production, while also noting that the short tracklist and inclusion of cover songs left listeners wanting more despite the group sounding "more grown up than ever before." Renowned for Sound editor Marcus Floyd similarly praised the album as a "pop album that is soulful rather than tasteless," calling it a smooth blend of ballads and upbeat tracks, with cover versions handled "nicely and with caress," though he acknowledged some moments where the pacing could have been stronger.

In a more critical review, Will Hodgkinson of The Times argued that Blue settle into "motorway service station-friendly pop-soul," suggesting a safe, middle-of-the-road approach to adult boyband pop. The Schwäbische Zeitung noted the group's attempt to reposition themselves as an "RRB-Popband," while still relying heavily on a "classical boyband sound" with "multi-part harmonies and catchy rhythms" and "swoon-worthy ballads." The newspaper noted that while the album "swings between classic pop and Motown influences" and does not yet fully match its inspirations, Blue are "on a good path," balancing familiarity with a gradual musical development.

== Commercial performance ==
First released in Ireland and the United Kingdom in the week of 6 March 2015, Colors debuted and peaked at number 13 on the UK Albums Chart. It was Blue's second consecutive album to reach this position. The album also peaked at number 21 on the Scottish Albums Chart and number 96 on the Oricon Chart in Japan. Following the album's poor commercial performance, Blue were dropped by Sony Music on 8 April 2015, leading to the premature termination of their two-album deal with the record company. Commenting on the album, Duncan James said in 2022: "No disrespect to the Colours album but the whole process of disrespect to the Colours wasn’t the most enjoyable. It wasn’t the most creative. It was just basically an album of covers that we were kind of [...] made to do and I think you know, we threw in some original songs because we just love writing."

== Track listing ==
Colours track listing
No.	Title	Writer(s)	Producer(s)	Length
1.	"King of the World"	Simon Webbe; Paul Barry; Patrick Mascall; James Jeffrey	Brian Rawling; Paul Meehan; James Jeffrey	3:25
2.	"You're the Only One"	George Nash Jr.; Demonté Posey; Eric Benét Jordan	Rawling; Meehan	3:44
3.	"Home"	Duncan James; Meehan; Anita Blay	Rawling; Meehan	3:48
4.	"If You Don't Know Me by Now"	Gamble & Huff	Rawling; Meehan	3:23
5.	"Nothing like You"	Antony Costa; Webbe; Lisa Greene; Noel Wayne; Sean McDonagh	Level 3; Meehan	3:10
6.	"Flashback"	Webbe; Barry; Mascall	Rawling; Meehan	4:04
7.	"I Don't Want to Talk About It"	Danny Whitten	Rawling; Meehan	4:04
8.	"Special"	Webbe; Alex Smith; Mark Taylor	Meehan	3:03
9.	"Hang On in There Baby"	Johnny Bristol	Rawling; Meehan	3:11
10.	"Endless Love"	Webbe; Lee Ryan; Meehan	Meehan	3:55

International version (bonus track)
No.	Title	Writer(s)	Producer(s)	Length
11.	"Oh Girl"	Eugene Record	Rawling; Meehan	3:49

== Charts ==
Chart performance for Colours
Chart (2015)	Peak position
Japanese Albums (Oricon)	96
Scottish Albums (OCC)	21
UK Albums (Official Charts)	13

== Release history ==
Colours release history
Country	Date	Format(s)	Label	Ref(s)
Ireland	6 March 2015	CD; digital download	Sony Music	
United Kingdom	9 March 2015	CD; digital download	Sony Music	
Germany	20 November 2015	CD; digital download	INgrooves; 25M	
