= Roulette Tour =

2013 concert tour by Blue

- Europe tour by Blue
- Promotional poster for the tour
- Associated album: Roulette
- Start date: 2 May 2013
- End date: 8 November 2013
- Legs: 2
- No. of shows: 36 in Europe

Blue concert chronology
- The Big Reunion (2013); Roulette Tour (2013); Colours Tour (2015–2016)

The Roulette Tour is the fourth headlining concert tour by the English boy band Blue. On 27 March 2013, the group announced live on British daytime magazine programme This Morning that they would be embarking on their first headlining tour after reuniting later on in the year. After one concert in London, the tour kicked off in Germany with nine dates and additional five dates one each in Austria, Switzerland, France and two in Italy all in late May and early June. The second leg led the tour through further twenty-one dates in United Kingdom. In 2018, the tour led to the release of The Roulette Tour 2013 (Live at The Hammersmith Apollo), their second live album.

== Critical reception ==
Sam Rigby from Digital Spy called the show "a welcome trip down memory lane." He found that "despite the fact that their new material is largely forgettable, Blue succeed in giving their fans a welcome trip down memory lane. Whether they can sustain their comeback remains to be seen, but for now, it's just nice to see those dance moves on show again."

== Set list ==
This set list is representative of the 2 May 2013 show in London.

=== First leg ===
Act 1

1. "Sorry Seems to Be the Hardest Word"
2. "Breathe Easy"
3. "U Make Me Wanna"
4. "Break My Heart"
5. "I Can"
6. "Best in Me"
7. "Don't Treat Me Like a Fool"
8. "Long Time"

Act 2

9. "All Rise"
10. "Too Close"
11. "Fly by II"
12. "Bubblin'"
13. "We've Got Tonight"
14. "Guilty"
15. "If You Come Back"
16. "Hurt Lovers"

Encores

17. "Curtain Falls"
18. "One Love"
19. "Without You"
20. "Sing for Me"

=== Second leg ===
Act 1

1. "We've Got Tonight" (Single Remix)
2. "Bubblin"' (Single Remix)
3. "Fly By II"
4. "Too Close"
5. "Ayo"
6. "Black Box"
7. "U Make Me Wanna"
8. "Sing for Me" (Single Remix)

Act 2

9. "Paradise"
10. "Break My Heart"
11. "Sorry Seems to Be the Hardest Word"
12. "If You Come Back"
13. "Broken"
14. "Without You"
15. "Break You Down"
16. "Heart on My Sleeve"
17. "Hurt Lovers"
18. "One Love"

Encores

19. "Breathe Easy"
20. "All Rise"

Notes

- The versions of "We've Got Tonight", "Bubblin'" and "Sing for Me" played on tour are different to the album versions:
  - "We've Got Tonight" and "Bubblin'" include a new middle-eight rap from Simon Webbe.
  - "Sing for Me" jumps into a club remix following the second chorus.

== Tour dates ==
List of concerts
Date	City	Country	Venue
First leg
2 May 2013	London	England	Shepherd's Bush Empire
21 May 2013	Cologne	Germany	Essigfabrik
22 May 2013	Recklinghausen	Germany	Vestarena
24 May 2013	Leipzig	Germany	Haus Auensee
26 May 2013	Berlin	Germany	Columbia Club
28 May 2013	Hamburg	Germany	Gruenspan
29 May 2013	Osnabrück	Germany	Rosenhof
31 May 2013	Hagen	Germany	Stadthalle
2 June 2013	Mannheim	Germany	Alte Seilerei
4 June 2013	Munich	Germany	Theaterfabrik
5 June 2013	Vienna	Austria	Arena
7 June 2013	Bern	Switzerland	Bierhübeli
8 June 2013	Milan	Italy	Maggazzini Genrali
9 June 2013	Rome	Italy	Palatlantico
11 June 2013	Paris	France	La Maroquinerie
14 September 2013	Ulaanbaatar	Mongolia	Central Stadium
Second leg
13 October 2013	Nottingham	England	Rock City
14 October 2013	Norwich	England	UEA, The Nick Rayns LCR
15 October 2013	Manchester	England	O2 Apollo
17 October 2013	Newcastle	England	O2 Academy
18 October 2013	Leeds	England	O2 Academy
19 October 2013	Glasgow	Scotland	O2 Academy
21 October 2013	Birmingham	England	O2 Academy
22 October 2013	London	England	Hammersmith Apollo
23 October 2013	Bristol	England	O2 Academy
25 October 2013	Oxford	England	O2 Academy
26 October 2013	Sheffield	England	O2 Academy
27 October 2013	Liverpool	England	O2 Academy
29 October 2013	Bournemouth	England	O2 Academy
30 October 2013	Cardiff	Wales	Great Hall
31 October 2013	Plymouth	England	Plymouth Pavilions
2 November 2013	Portsmouth	England	Portsmouth Guildhall
3 November 2013	Cambridge	England	Cambridge Corn Exchange
4 November 2013	Ipswich	England	Regent Theatre
6 November 2013	Southend	England	Cliffs Pavilion
7 November 2013	Birmingham	England	O2 Academy
8 November 2013	Brighton	England	Brighton Centre
11 November 2013	Belfast	Northern Ireland	Waterfront Hall
12 November 2013	Dublin	Ireland	Olympia Theatre
21 November 2013	Milan	Italy	Alcatraz
22 November 2013	Rome	Italy	Atlantico Live
23 November 2013	San Biagio di Callalta	Italy	Supersonic Music Arena
25 November 2013	Paris	France	L'alhambra
26 November 2013	Mannheim	Germany	Alte Seilerei
28 November 2013	Minsk	Belarus	Palace of the Republic
30 November 2013	Istanbul	Turkey	Zorlu Center
2 December 2013	Hamburg	Germany	Docks Hamburg
3 December 2013	Cologne	Germany	Essigfabrik
4 December 2013	Bremen	Germany	Aladin Music Hall
