= Gladman =

Gladman is a surname. Notable people with the surname include:

- Brett J. Gladman (born 1966), Canadian astronomer
- Constance Helen Gladman (1922–1964), Australian Roman Catholic nun
- Frederick John Gladman (1839–1884), Australian educator and writer
- Ken Gladman (born 1946), Australian rules footballer
- Malcolm Gladman (1915–1987), Australian politician
- Marjorie Gladman (1908–1999), American tennis player
- Renee Gladman (born 1971), American poet and writer
- Rod Gladman (born 1968), Australian rules footballer

== See also ==
- Gladman's Procession, a 1443 conflict in Norwich, England
- 7638 Gladman, a main-belt asteroid
