= Haven't Found You Yet =

Single by Blue

from the album Heart & Soul
- Released: 25 May 2022
- Length: 3:20
- Label: Tag8; BMG
- Songwriters: Antony Costa; Alexander Karlsson; Lee Ryan; Ronny Svendsen; Anne Judith Wik
- Producers: Ronny Svendsen; Hugh Goldsmith

Blue singles chronology
"Nothing Like You" (2015)	"Haven't Found You Yet" (2022)	"Dance with Me" (2022)

"Haven't Found You Yet" is a song by English boy band Blue. It was released as the album's lead single on 25 May 2022. It peaked at number 61 on the UK Singles Downloads Chart.

== Background ==
"Haven't Found You Yet" was written by band members Lee Ryan, and Antony Costa along with Alexander Karlsson, Ronny Svendsen, and Anne Judith Wik, while production was overseen by Svendsen and Hugh Goldsmith. It was one of the first songs written for Heart & Soul and cited as a "benchmark" regarding the quality of songs they would produce later. When asked about their decision to release the song as the lead single from the album, they said: "For us it was the album's strongest contender, a mix of the classic blues with a great modern twist."

== Music video ==
A music video for "Haven't Found You Yet" was directed by Jackson Ducasse and released online on 25 May 2022.

== Track listing ==
Digital download
No.	Title	Writer(s)	Producer(s)	Length
1.	"Haven't Found You Yet"	Lee Ryan; Anne Judith Wik; Ronny Svendsen; Antony Costa; Alexander Karlsson	Ronny Svendsen; Hugh Goldsmith; Ben Cartwright^{[a]}	3:20

Notes

- ^a signifies a vocal producer

== Charts ==
Weekly chart performance for "Haven't Found You Yet"
Chart (2022)	Peak position
UK Singles Downloads (OCC)	61

== Release history ==
Release dates and formats for "Haven't Found You Yet"
Region	Date	Format	Label	Ref
Various	25 May 2022	Digital download; streaming	Tag8; BMG	
