= Hugh Goldsmith =

English music executive

- Born: London, UK
- Occupations: Music industry executive; songwriter; producer; consultant
- Years active: 1992–present
- Musical career
- Genres: Pop; RnB; rock
- Labels: RCA UK; Innocent Records (Virgin); Brightside Recordings (Sony BMG)

Hugh Goldsmith is a music industry executive from London, England. After leaving his role as managing director of RCA Records in the UK, he founded Innocent Records.

== Career ==
Prior to joining RCA Records as marketing director in 1992, Goldsmith had been a full-time musician and songwriter, and had also worked in the advertising and publishing industries. According to a Financial Times article by Sathnam Sanghera, Goldsmith made “a name for himself by helping to break Take That”.

Goldsmith was promoted to the position of Managing Director of RCA Records UK in 1995. Significant artists who Goldsmith worked with during his time at RCA included Annie Lennox, Take That, M People, David Bowie, Kylie Minogue, Robson and Jerome, Five and Natalie Imbruglia.

In 1997, Goldsmith was hired by Virgin Records' president Paul Conroy, and was tasked with launching and heading up a new pop label. The resulting label, Innocent Records, launched the music careers of Blue, Atomic Kitten, Billie Piper and Martine McCutcheon. During Goldsmith's time at Innocent Records, its artists achieved 10 UK number 1 singles and five UK number 1 albums.

In 2002, Goldsmith won the Music Week A&R award.

Goldsmith started a new joint venture label with Sony BMG in 2004 called Brightside Recordings which also housed indie label Ugly Truth. Brightside saw Goldsmith reunite with Imbruglia following their initial working relationship at RCA in 1997. Her single "Shiver" went on to become Britain's most broadcast track in 2005. Other acts signed to Brightside/Ugly Truth included Rooster and Newton Faulkner. Goldsmith left Brightside in 2009 to set up an independent publishing and production company called Hotspring Music.

In 2015, Goldsmith was brought in by the BBC as a music consultant to help find the songs and acts to represent the United Kingdom at the 2016 Eurovision Song Contest. Goldsmith returned to perform the same role for the 2017 and 2018 competitions.

== Songwriting credits ==
Writing under the pseudonym, Ian Hope or I. Hope, Goldsmith has co-written several songs recorded by Blue. These include "If You Come Back", which peaked at number 1 in the UK, plus "Long Time" and "Back To You" from Blue’s debut album, All Rise. A decade later he re-teamed with Blue to co-write their Eurovision song contest entry, "I Can". In 2022, Goldsmith reunited with Blue again, A&R-ing and executive producing their sixth album, Heart and Soul. He also co-wrote that album’s "Let’s Get Sad".
