= Roulette (album) =

Studio album by Blue
- Released: 25 January 2013
- Recorded: July 2010 – 14 June 2012
- Studios: Los Angeles, United States; New York City, United States; London, United Kingdom
- Genres: Pop; R&B
- Length: 44:46
- Labels: Island; Blueworld
- Producers: BeatGeek; Cufather & Joe; Da Beatfreakz; Daniel Davidsen; Steve DuBerry; The Fives; Martin Fliegenschmidt; Jason Gill; Robin Grubert; Troy Henry; Kiko Masbaum; RedOne; Lucas Secon; Geo Slam; Julian Vasquez; Ali Zuckowski

Blue chronology
Ultimate Blue (2013)	Roulette (2013)	Colours (2015)

Singles from Roulette
- 1. "Hurt Lovers" Released: 7 January 2013; 2. "Without You" Released: 16 May 2013; 3. "Break My Heart" Released: 5 August 2013; 4. "Broken"/"Ayo" Released: 2 February 2014

Roulette is the fourth studio album by English boy band Blue, released from 25 January 2013 through Blueworld and Island Records. Their first studio album in ten years, Blue began working on the project in 2010 with a number of American musicians such as Bruno Mars and Ne-Yo, though it was eventually significantly reworked, involving production from a range of different producers such as Cufather & Joe, Steve DuBerry, RedOne, and Lucas Secon, among others. Band members Lee Ryan, Duncan James, Antony Costa, and Simon Webbe co-wrote on several tracks on the album.

Critics praised Roulette for showcasing Blue's vocals and their familiar pop/R&B sound, though some questioned the band's reliance on nostalgia and safe choices. Commercially, the album failed to match the success of their earlier releases, although it did reach the top 20 of the charts in Germany and the United Kingdom. Roulette''s lead single "Hurt Lovers" became a top ten hit on the German Singles Chart. In further promotion of the album, Island later issued a deluxe tour edition, containing a bonus disc of remixes, while the band embarked on the European Roulette Tour from May to December 2013.

== Background ==
In November 2004, Blue released the compilation album Best of Blue. It spawned the top five hits "Curtain Falls", "Get Down on It" and "Only Words I Know" and reached the top ten on several international charts, eventually achieving multi-platinum status in Italy, Portugal, and the United Kingdom, while going gold in several other countries. In early 2005, the group announced that they would go on hiatus to focus on their solo careers for a while, but assured fans that they were not breaking up. A farewell tour that was due to include twelve UK shows plus concerts in Italy, Turkey and Germany, was cancelled however, when Lee Ryan developed vocal cord nodules on his throat and was told to rest his voice. It was eventually rescheduled in a reduced form and took place between June and July 2005.

In 2009, rumors surfaced that Blue was planning a comeback, including the release of a new studio album. In July 2010, the band began recording new material for the project. In a March 2011 interview with Digital Spy, Ryan revealed: "We've been writing with Ne-Yo, and I've written at least a couple of songs on my own that will probably make the album. We've also been working with Bruno Mars on a song called "Black & Blue" – he's sending his parts over from a demo we recorded a while ago. It's got some haunting notes on the chorus." They also revealed that three tracks on the album had been produced by RedOne, and that they felt that the material was "their best work to date". In October 2012, the group confirmed via their official Facebook page that the title of their fourth studio album would be Roulette. It was also revealed that the album would receive an early release in Germany, being made available from 25 January 2013. The band shot the album's artwork in a deserted casino in November 2012.

== Promotion ==
The release of Roulette was preceded by "I Can," the band's comeback single. The track served as the United Kingdom's entry for the Eurovision Song Contest 2011, which was held in Düsseldorf, Germany. It came 11th in the contest, scoring 100 points. The single was released on 1 May 2011 as a digital download, with the physical release the day after. It reached the top ten in Austria, Germany, and Switzerland and peaked at number 16 on the UK Singles Chart, becoming Blue's lowest-charting single in the United Kingdom up to then. "I Can" was later included as an international bonus track on Roulette.

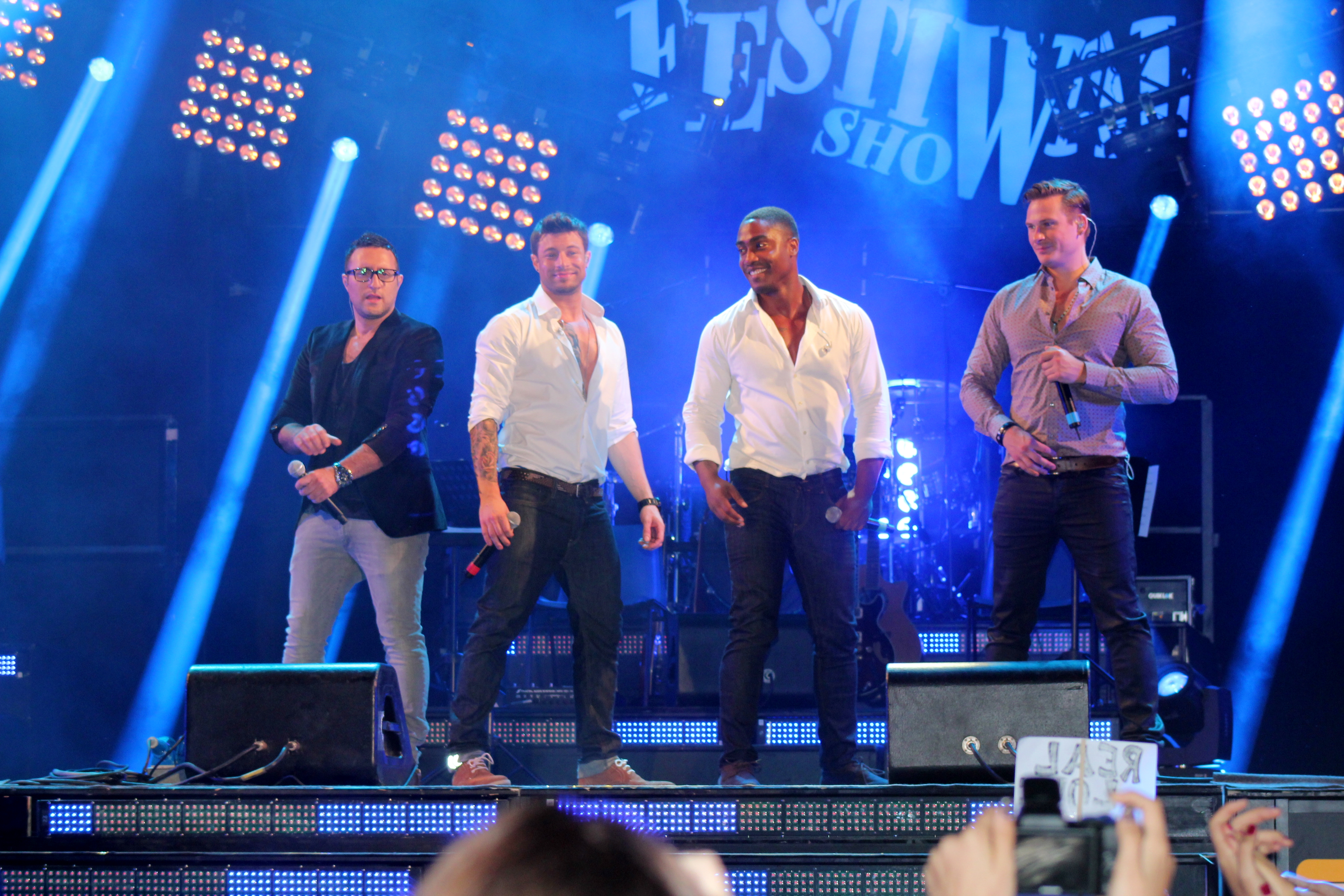
Blue performing in Italy in 2013

On 22 June 2012, the band premiered "Hurt Lovers" during a concert in China. On 4 January 2013, the song was released as the album's lead single in German-speaking Europe – three weeks prior to the release of Roulette there. The creators of the German film Break Up Man (2013) had approached the band, and asked if the song could be used as the official theme for the film. Thus, the track received an early release, before being released across the world later that year. While the song became another top ten success in Germany, peaking at number seven on the German Singles Chart, it reached number 70 in the United Kingdom only. In promotion of the song, the band performed it live on Vocea României on 4 December 2012, as well as embarking on an acoustic radio tour across six cities in Germany.

Released exclusively in German-speaking Europe, "Without You" served as the album’s second single on 16 May 2013, with its music video premiering the same day. "Break My Heart"' was released as the album's third single, premiering on radio on 29 June 2013 and becoming available for digital download on 5 August. It was officially released as a single only in Germany, while in the United Kingdom it served as a promotional radio single. The music video premiered on 18 August. In the United Kingdom, the track was later included as the third single on the Roulette summer edition EP, released on 2 September 2013. "Broken" and "Ayo" were released simultaneously as the fourth and fifth singles in the United Kingdom and Ireland on 2 February 2014. The music video for "Broken" premiered on 31 January 2013. From May to December 2013, Blue embarked on the European Roulette Tour.

== Critical reception ==
Professional ratings
Review scores
Source	Rating
Daily Express	3/5 stars

Stephen Unwin from Daily Express found that "one of the great things about Blue is that they can all sing, especially Lee. Another is that they can pull together a song, either among themselves or roping in an Elton John or two, that is standout good. Another is that they're likeable, even if you're not 13 and anyone that will stick to Blu-Tack will do. We don't even mind that they split up ages ago, arguably knowing that making up is the most profitable thing to do. So here they are trying to convince us that they never lost it and it's working."

Renowned for Sound editor Brendon Veevers wrote that the "pop/RnB sound that is synonymous with Blue is found within almost each song that makes up Roulette. While it is great to be offered something we are familiar with in terms of Blue pennings we wonder if it is wise for the group to be so reliant on a safety net at this point in their career, particularly since it hadn’t work for them as well as they had hoped when they first made a comeback two years ago? We aren’t entirely sure it is. Regardless of this, Roulette is a fun and weighty release from Blue who may just find themselves back in the charts if they pick their singles wisely from the record."

== Commercial performance ==
First released in German-speaking Europe on 25 January 2013, Roulette debuted and peaked at number 14 on the German Albums Chart, making it Blue's second-highest-charting album in Germany after Guilty (2003). The album scored its highest chart success in the United Kingdom, where it was released on 28 April 2013 and debuted at number 13 on the UK Albums Chart. It was Blue's first regular album that failed to reach either the top ten or number one on the chart. Roulette also reached number three on the Independent Albums Charts, number 10 on the Physical Albums Chart, and number 22 on the Album Downloads Chart in the United Kingdom. In Scotland, it peaked at number 21 on the Scottish Albums Chart.

== Track listing ==
Roulette track listing
No.	Title	Writer(s)	Producer(s)	Length
1.	"Hurt Lovers"	Ali Zuckowski; Martin "Fly" Fliegenschmidt; Jez Ashurst; David Jost	Robin Grubert; Zuckowski; Fliegenschmidt^{[a]}; Kiko Masbaum^{[a]}	3:56
2.	"Without You"	Wayne Hector; Mich Hansen; Jason Gill; Daniel Davidsen; Lee Ryan; Duncan James; Antony Costa; Simon Webbe	Cutfather; Gill; Davidsen	3:27
3.	"Break My Heart"	Novel Jannusi; George Wallen; Ryan; James; Costa; Webbe	BeatGeek; Julian Vasquez^{[a]}	4:06
4.	"Ayo"	Saif Naqui; Troy Henry; Ryan; James; Costa; Webbe	Henry	3:50
5.	"Risk It All"	Lucas Secon; Hector	Secon	3:42
6.	"Heart on My Sleeve"	Hector; Hansen; Gill; Davidsen	Cutfather; Gill; Davidsen	3:51
7.	"We've Got Tonight"	Jannusi; Hector; Wallen; Pat Devine; Ryan; James; Costa; Webbe	BeatGeek	3:39
8.	"Paradise"	Jannusi; Geo Slam; Ryan; James; Costa; Webbe	BeatGeek; Slam^{[a]}	3:46
9.	"Black Box"	Hector; Secon; Hansen; Jonas Jeberg	Cutfather; Jeberg	3:28
10.	"Broken"	Devine; Carl Haley; Greg Haley; Charlie Platt; Rafael Haley; Jake Isaac; Ryan; James; Costa; Webbe	The Fives	3:56
11.	"Break You Down"	Hi W. Jackson; Obi Ebele; Uche Ebele; Ryan; James; Costa; Webbe	Da Beatfreakz; Steve DuBerry	3:38
12.	"All I Need"	DuBerry; Ryan; James; Costa; Webbe	DuBerry	3:27
Total length:				44:46

French/Italian/Norwegian/Austrian/Swiss/German bonus track
No.	Title	Writer(s)	Producer(s)	Length
13.	"I Can"	James; Ryan; Ben Collier; Ciaron Bell; Ian Hope; Liam Keenan; StarSign	Ronny Svendsen; Hallgeir Rustan	3:01
Total length:				47:47

UK and Ireland/International bonus track
No.	Title	Writer(s)	Producer(s)	Length
13.	"Sing for Me"	Novel Jannusi; Teddy Sky	RedOne	3:18
Total length:				48:04

German iTunes Store deluxe edition bonus tracks
No.	Title	Writer(s)	Producer(s)	Length
14.	"Give Me a Shot"	Uche Ebele; Obi Ebele; Andres Gill; Zachary Maxey; Ryan; James; Costa; Webbe; Mario Bayliss	Da Beatfreakz; DuBerry	3:32
15.	"Sing for Me"	Jannusi; Sky	RedOne	3:18

International iTunes Store deluxe edition bonus track
No.	Title	Writer(s)	Producer(s)	Length
14.	"Give Me a Shot"	Uche Ebele; Obi Ebele; Gill; Maxey; Ryan; James; Costa; Webbe; Bayliss	Da Beatfreakz; DuBerry	3:32

Deluxe tour edition bonus remix disc
No.	Title	Writer(s)	Producer(s)	Length
1.	"Break My Heart" (Tracy Young's Ferosh Radio Mix – Dirty)	Jannusi; Wallen; Ryan; James; Costa; Webbe	BeatGeek; Vasquez^{[a]}; Tracy Young^{[b]}	3:40
2.	"Break My Heart" (Radio Edit – No Rap)	Jannusi; Wallen; Ryan; James; Costa; Webbe	BeatGeek; Vasquez^{[a]}	3:02
3.	"Break My Heart" (Tracy Young's Ferosh Extended Dub Mix)	Jannusi; Wallen; Ryan; James; Costa; Webbe	BeatGeek; Vasquez^{[a]}; Young^{[b]}	5:32
4.	"Break My Heart" (Tracy Young's Ferosh Extended Mix)	Jannusi; Wallen; Ryan; James; Costa; Webbe	BeatGeek; Vasquez^{[a]}; Young^{[b]}	5:32
5.	"Break My Heart" (Tracy Young's Ferosh Radio Mix – Clean)	Jannusi; Wallen; Ryan; James; Costa; Webbe	BeatGeek; Vasquez^{[a]}; Young^{[b]}	3:39
6.	"Break My Heart" (Radio Edit)	Jannusi; Wallen; Ryan; James; Costa; Webbe	BeatGeek; Vasquez^{[a]}	3:25
7.	"Break My Heart" (Single Mix)	Jannusi; Wallen; Ryan; James; Costa; Webbe	BeatGeek; Vasquez^{[a]}	3:29
8.	"Hurt Lovers" (Radio Edit)	Zuckowski; Fliegenschmidt; Ashurst; Jost	Grubert; Zuckowski; Fliegenschmidt^{[a]}; Masbaum^{[a]}	3:23
9.	"Hurt Lovers" (Boot Slap's Club Mix)	Zuckowski; Fliegenschmidt; Ashurst; Jost	Grubert; Zuckowski; Fliegenschmidt^{[a]}; Masbaum^{[a]}; Boot Slap^{[b]}	5:52
10.	"Hurt Lovers" (TroyBoi Remix)	Zuckowski; Fliegenschmidt; Ashurst; Jost	Grubert; Zuckowski; Fliegenschmidt^{[a]}; Masbaum^{[a]}; TroyBoi^{[b]}	3:57
11.	"Hurt Lovers" (Acapella)	Zuckowski; Fliegenschmidt; Ashurst; Jost	Grubert; Zuckowski; Fliegenschmidt^{[a]}; Masbaum^{[a]}	3:38
12.	"Sing for Me" (Tracy Young's Ferosh Radio Mix)	Jannusi; Sky	RedOne; Young^{[b]}	3:06
13.	"Sing for Me" (Tracy Young's Ferosh Extended Mix)	Jannusi; Sky	RedOne; Young^{[b]}	5:51
14.	"Paradise" (Tracy Young's Ferosh Radio Mix)	Jannusi; Slam; Ryan; James; Costa; Webbe	BeatGeek; Slam^{[a]}; Young^{[b]}	3:44
15.	"Paradise" (Tracy Young's Ferosh Extended Mix)	Jannusi; Slam; Ryan; James; Costa; Webbe	BeatGeek; Slam^{[a]}; Young^{[b]}	5:33
16.	"Ayo" (Tracy Young's Ferosh Radio Mix)	Saif Naqui; Troy Henry; Ryan; James; Costa; Webbe	Henry; Young^{[b]}	3:23
17.	"Ayo" (Tracy Young's Ferosh Extended Mix)	Saif Naqui; Troy Henry; Ryan; James; Costa; Webbe	Henry; Young^{[b]}	6:22

Notes

- ^a signifies a co-producer
- ^b signifies an additional producer

== Charts ==
Chart performance for Roulette
Chart (2013)	Peak position
Austrian Albums (Ö3 Austria)	30
German Albums (Offizielle Top 100)	14
Irish Albums (IRMA)	90
Italian Albums (FIMI)	32
Japanese Albums (Oricon)	192
Scottish Albums (Official Charts)	21
Swiss Albums (Schweizer Hitparade)	31
UK Albums (Official Charts)	13
UK Album Downloads (Official Charts)	22
UK Independent Albums (Official Charts)	3

== Release history ==
Roulette release history
Country	Date	Format(s)	Label	Ref(s)
Germany	25 January 2013	CD; digital download	Island; Universal	
Italy	1 February 2013	CD; digital download	Island; Universal	—
South Africa	23 February 2013	CD; digital download	Island; Universal	—
United Kingdom	28 April 2013	CD; digital download	Island	
Ireland	28 April 2013	CD; digital download	Island	
United Kingdom	4 November 2013		Island	
