= Heart & Soul (Blue album) =

Studio album by Blue
- Released: 28 October 2022
- Length: 30:26
- Label: Tag8; BMG
- Producer: Ben Collier; Steve DuBerry; Hugh Goldsmith; Shift K3Y; Ronny Svendsen; Paul Visser

Blue chronology
Colours (2015)	Heart & Soul (2022)	Reflections (2026)

Singles from Heart & Soul
- 1. "Haven't Found You Yet" Released: 25 May 2022; 2. "Dance with Me" Released: 29 June 2022; 3. "Magnetic" Released: 16 September 2022; 4. "Heart & Soul" Released: 4 October 2022

Heart & Soul is the sixth studio album by English boy band Blue, released on 28 October 2022 through Tag8 and BMG. Their first album in seven years, the group renuited with their former producer and A&R manager Hugh Goldsmith to work on the album, which also involves production from Steve DuBerry, Lewis Shay Jankel, and Ronny Svendsen, among others. Recordings took place primarily in London, where, due to COVID-19 restrictions, the band members recorded their vocals separately from one another.

Critics praised Heart & Soul as a strong comeback for Blue, highlighting the band's signature harmonies, chemistry, and blend of nostalgic and contemporary styles, with some calling it their best work in years despite a few tracks feeling slightly dated. On charts, Heart & Soul opened and peaked at number 22 on the UK Albums Chart, becoming Blue's lowest yet, while still reaching number 4 on the UK Independent Albums Chart and number 18 in Scotland. The album's release was preceded by two singles, including "Haven't Found You Yet" and "Dance with Me," a cover version of the 112 song.

== Background ==
In March 2015, Blue released Colours, their fifth studio album, through Sony Music. A commercial disappointment, the album missed the top 10 on the UK Albums Chart, ultimately resulting in the premature termination of their two-album deal with the label, signed in November 2014. Following their departure from Sony, the band shifted their focus solely to touring over the following years, while also pursuing individual projects, with Antony Costa and Duncan James concentrating on their acting careers and Lee Ryan and Simon Webbe releasing solo music. By 2019, the group confirmed they had no intention of releasing new material, choosing instead to continue performing live.

In early 2020, Blue flew to Sweden to write new music with Dsign Music members Anne Judith Wik and Ronny Svendsen. While the band had no plan to do another album, the sessions produced five finished songs, including what would become lead single "Haven't Found You Yet." Satisfied with the output, the band felt motivated to continue recording, though they were later forced to relocate recording to London due to the COVID-19 pandemic, with much of their vocals recorded separately. Speaking about the album, Blue said while they never expected to make another album, they ended up working with their old producer Hugh Goldsmith again, saying: "Our career started with Hugh so it's nice to come back and work with him again. He's got an amazing understanding of music."

== Promotion ==
"Haven't Found You Yet," which the band has described as "the album's strongest contender, a mix of the classic blues with a great modern twist," was released as the album's first single on 25 May 2022. Accompanied by a music video directed by Jackson Ducasse, it debuted and reached number 61 on the UK Singles Downloads Chart. "Dance with Me," a cover version of the 2001 song by American group 112, was released as the album's second single on 29 June 2022. The band has cited their version as an homage to "Too Close," another R&B cover that Blue had recorded in 2001. "Magnetic," serving as the album's third single, was released on 16 September 2022, followed by a fourth single, the title track "Heart & Soul," for which a lyric video, also directed by Ducasse, was issued on 4 October 2022.

== Critical reception ==
Professional ratings
Review scores
Source	Rating
musicOMH	3/5 stars
Retro Pop	4/5 stars

Retro Pop said "Covering a range of styles inherent to the band's repertoire, Heart & Soul sees Blue do what they do best and on Heart & Soul they succeed in regrouping for an album that dabbles in nostalgia while continuing to push their sound." Ben Devlin from musicOMH found that on Heart & Soul, the "re-energised boyband's natural chemistry finds them putting their own spin on a pot-luck array of contemporary styles." Pip Ellwood-Hughes, writing for Entertainment Focus, called Heart & Soul "their best album in years" and "one of, if not the, best pop album of 2022 (so far)." He found that the album "sees the four-piece getting back into the groove mixing classic elements of the Blue sound with contemporary sounds." Lucy Case from Renowned for Sound found that while a few songs "do feel slightly dated," Heart & Soul was "a great new collection of modern hits [...] showcasing their powerful harmonies and working on a more modern sound to suit 2022."

== Chart performance ==
The Official Charts Company predicted that Heart & Soul would enter the UK Top 100 Albums Chart at number 10. In doing so, Blue would score their highest album chart entry since 2003's Guilty. However, when the official chart for that week was announced on 4 November 2022, it showed Heart & Soul had debuted at number 22 on the UK Top 100; making it the group's lowest-charting album to date. Heart & Soul also reached number 4 on the UK Independent Albums chart, and peaked at number 18 on the Scottish Albums Chart.

== Track listing ==
Heart & Soul track listing
No.	Title	Writer(s)	Producer(s)	Length
1.	"Haven't Found You Yet"	Lee Ryan; Anne Judith Wik; Ronny Svendsen; Antony Costa; Alexander Karlsson	Ronny Svendsen; Hugh Goldsmith; Ben Cartwright^{[a]}	3:20
2.	"Dance with Me"	Jason Boyd; Daron Jones; Michael Keith	Steve DuBerry; Goldsmith; Cartwright^{[a]}	2:40
3.	"This Could Be Love"	Chris Young; Ryan; Nermin Harambasic	Young; Svendsen	2:56
4.	"Let's Get Sad"	Ben Collier; Goldsmith; Ryan; Simon Webbe; Costa; Duncan James; Kye Sones	Collier; Paul Visser	3:32
5.	"Heart & Soul"	Uzoechi Emenike; Lewis Shay Jankel	Shift K3Y	2:42
6.	"Man Do"	Wik; Ryan; Svendsen	Svendsen	2:58
7.	"Magnetic"	Joseph Barboza; Costa; James; Ryan; Webbe; David Ferguson; Benjamin Roberts; Paul Visser	Visser	3:14
8.	"Gravity"	Costa; James; Ryan; Webbe; Steve Duberry	Duberry	3:13
9.	"Ultraviolet"	James; Visser; Ria Jaggard	Visser	2:15
10.	"Stop"	Diondria Thornton; Christopher Thornton; Fabio Filos Franceschi; Costa; Roger Hayes; Bruce Parham, Jr.; James; Ryan	Duberry	3:36
Total length:				30:26

Notes

- ^a signifies a vocal producer

== Tour ==
Date	City	Country	Venue
4 December 2022	Cardiff	Wales	Motorpoint Arena
5 December 2022	Manchester	England	AO Arena
7 December 2022	Leeds	England	First Direct Arena
9 December 2022	Birmingham	England	Resorts World Arena
11 December 2022	Liverpool	England	M&S Bank Arena
12 December 2022	Brighton	England	Brighton Centre
13 December 2022	London	England	The O2 Arena
15 December 2022	Bournemouth	England	Bournemouth International Centre
16 December 2022	Nottingham	England	Motorpoint Arena
18 December 2022	Aberdeen	Scotland	P&J Live
19 December 2022	Glasgow	Scotland	OVO Hydro
20 December 2022	Newcastle	England	Utilita Arena

== Personnel ==
Performers and musicians

- Steve DuBerry – bass, drums, guitar, keyboards, piano, backing vocals
- Lewis Shay Jankel – bass, drums, guitar
- Ronny Svendsen – guitar, organ, piano, drum programming, synthesizer
- Paul Visser – piano, programming
- Anne Judith Wik – backing vocals
- Chris Young – piano

Technical

- Ben Collier – producer
- Steve DuBerry – engineer, producer
- Ben Cartwright – vocal producer
- Lewis Shay Jankel – engineer, producer
- Ronny Svendsen – engineer, producer
- Kevin Tuffy – engineer
- Paul Visser – engineer, producer
- Chris Young – engineer, producer

== Charts ==
Chart performance for Heart & Soul
Chart (2022)	Peak position
Belgian Albums (Ultratop Flanders)	44
Belgian Albums (Ultratop Wallonia)	200
Scottish Albums (OCC)	18
UK Albums (OCC)	22
UK Independent Albums (OCC)	4

== Release history ==
Heart & Soul release history
Region	Date	Label	Format	Ref(s)
Various	28 October 2022	Tag8; BMG	CD, cassette, digital	
