= I Can (Blue song) =

2011 song by Blue

Single by Blue

from the album Roulette
- Released: 1 May 2011
- Recorded: 2010–2011
- Genre: Pop, dance-pop
- Length: 3:01
- Label: Blueworld
- Songwriters: Duncan James, Lee Ryan, Ciaron Bell, Ben Collier, Ian Hope, Liam Keenan, StarSign
- Producers: Ronny Svendsen, Hallgeir Rustan

Blue singles chronology
"Only Words I Know" (2005)	"I Can" (2011)	"Hurt Lovers" (2013)

Audio sample
- I Can: file; help

Music video
- "I Can" on YouTube

(United Kingdom) "I Can"

Eurovision Song Contest 2011 entry
- Country: United Kingdom
- Artist: Blue
- Language: English
- Composers: Duncan James; Lee Ryan; Ciaron Bell; Ben Collier; Ian Hope; Liam Keenan; StarSign
- Lyricists: Duncan James; Lee Ryan; Ciaron Bell; Ben Collier; Ian Hope; Liam Keenan; StarSign

Finals performance
- Final result: 11th
- Final points: 100

Entry chronology
- ◄ "That Sounds Good to Me" (2010)
- "Love Will Set You Free" (2012) ►

"I Can" is a song released by British boy group Blue, taken from their fourth studio album, Roulette. It was the United Kingdom's entry for the Eurovision Song Contest 2011, in Düsseldorf, Germany. It was written by group members Duncan James and Lee Ryan with Ciaron Bell, Ben Collieer, Ian Hope, Liam Keenan, and Norwegian production team StarSign.

"I Can" finished in 11th place and scored 100 points. It peaked at number sixteen on the UK Singles Chart, and reached the top ten in Germany, Austria and Switzerland. It also charted in Belgium, Ireland, and Scotland.

== Critical reception ==
Digital Spy gave the song three stars out of five, and wrote: "I've never lost anything quite like this/ No second chances if I don't find it," the band continue over juddering synths that give way to a fist-clenching, Blue for 2011 chorus that sadly just misses the spot - the watered down production suggesting they aren't as cocksure of this plan as they claim. [...] Still - call them crazy, but there's enough here to suggest they might just pull the whole thing off."

== Promotion ==
During an appearance on BBC Breakfast on 9 February 2011, Blue confirmed that the song was written before they were asked to represent the UK in Düsseldorf, and described it as "a mix of pop, anthem and typically Blue sounding". On 12 February 2011, Blue began their promotional tour with an appearance on Malta Eurosong 2011. As 'I Can' had not yet finished production, the group sang their previous hit "If You Come Back". This was followed by another guest appearance, singing "Breathe Easy" on the Spanish national final Destino Eurovisión on 18 February. The band performed the song for the first time on 11 March 2011 on The Graham Norton Show.

A promotional video for the song has also been released by BBC One with the blue London skyline in the background. They appeared at various events including at Comic Relief Does Glee Club on 17 March 2011 and on the Italian version of Top of the Pops on 21 March. The official music video was launched on 14 April 2011. The BBC aired a special one-hour documentary entitled Eurovision: Your Country Needs Blue on 16 April 2011, to mark their preparations for the 2011 Eurovision Song Contest. The single was released on 1 May 2011.

Blue also appeared nude in British gay monthly Attitude in the magazine's annual Naked issue. Blue was featured both on the cover and in an inside major article in promotion of the British bid to Eurovision. Blue performed the song on Paul O'Grady Live on 29 April and on the So You Think You Can Dance UK results show.

== Eurovision Song Contest ==
It was the first time in Eurovision Song Contest history that the British entry has been decided internally by the BBC. An announcement was made on 29 January 2011 through the BBC News and official Eurovision Song Contest websites. It finished in 11th place in the Eurovision Song Contest 2011.

Bulgaria gave the song 12 points (the highest possible score), Italy 10 points, Malta 7 and Turkey 6. Overall, if the jury vote had not been counted the song would have finished in 5th place as it did from televotes.

== Track listing ==
UK digital EP
No.	Title	Writer(s)	Producer(s)	Length
1.	"I Can" (StarSign Radio Edit)	Ciaron Bell; Ben Collier; Ian Hope; Duncan James; Liam Keenan; Hallgeir Rustan; Lee Ryan; Ronny Svendsen	Rustan; Svendsen	3:01
2.	"I Can" (Original Mix)	Bell; Collier; Hope; James; Keenan; Rustan; Ryan; Svendsen	Rustan; Svendsen	3:09
3.	"I Can" (Instrumental)	Bell; Collier; Hope; James; Keenan; Rustan; Ryan; Svendsen	Rustan; Svendsen	3:01

UK CD single
No.	Title	Writer(s)	Producer(s)	Length
1.	"I Can" (Original Mix)	Bell; Collier; Hope; James; Keenan; Rustan; Ryan; Svendsen	Rustan; Svendsen	3:03
2.	"I Can" (Funky Viva Remix)	Bell; Collier; Hope; James; Keenan; Rustan; Ryan; Svendsen	Rustan; Svendsen; Funky Silhouette^{[a]}	3:07
3.	"All Rise" (Acoustic Version)	Mikkel S. Eriksen; Tor Erik Hermansen; Rustan; Daniel Stephens; Simon Webbe	Stargate; Stevie Paul^{[a]}	4:25

German digital download / CD single
No.	Title	Writer(s)	Producer(s)	Length
1.	"I Can" (Radio Edit)	Bell; Collier; Hope; James; Keenan; Rustan; Ryan; Svendsen	Rustan; Svendsen	3:01
2.	"I Can" (Funky Viva Remix)	Bell; Collier; Hope; James; Keenan; Rustan; Ryan; Svendsen	Rustan; Svendsen; Funky Silhouette^{[a]}	3:07

Notes

- ^a signifies an additional producer

== Charts ==
=== Weekly charts ===
Weekly chart performance for "I Can"
Chart (2011)	Peak position
Austria (Ö3 Austria Top 40)	8
Belgium (Ultratip Bubbling Under Flanders)	17
Belgium (Ultratip Bubbling Under Wallonia)	45
Germany (GfK)	7
Ireland (IRMA)	34
Latvia (Latvijas Top 50)	9
Scotland Singles (OCC)	19
Switzerland (Schweizer Hitparade)	8
UK Singles (OCC)	16
UK Airplay (Music Week)	29

=== Year-end charts ===
Year-end chart performance for "I Can"
Chart (2011)	Position
Germany (Media Control GfK)	63

== Release history ==
Release dates and formats for "I Can"
Region	Date	Format(s)	Label	Ref
United Kingdom	1 May 2011	Digital download	Blueworld	
United Kingdom	2 May 2011	CD single	Blueworld	
Germany	13 May 2011	Digital download	Island Records	
Germany	13 May 2011	CD single	Island Records	
