= Blue (English group) =

English boy band

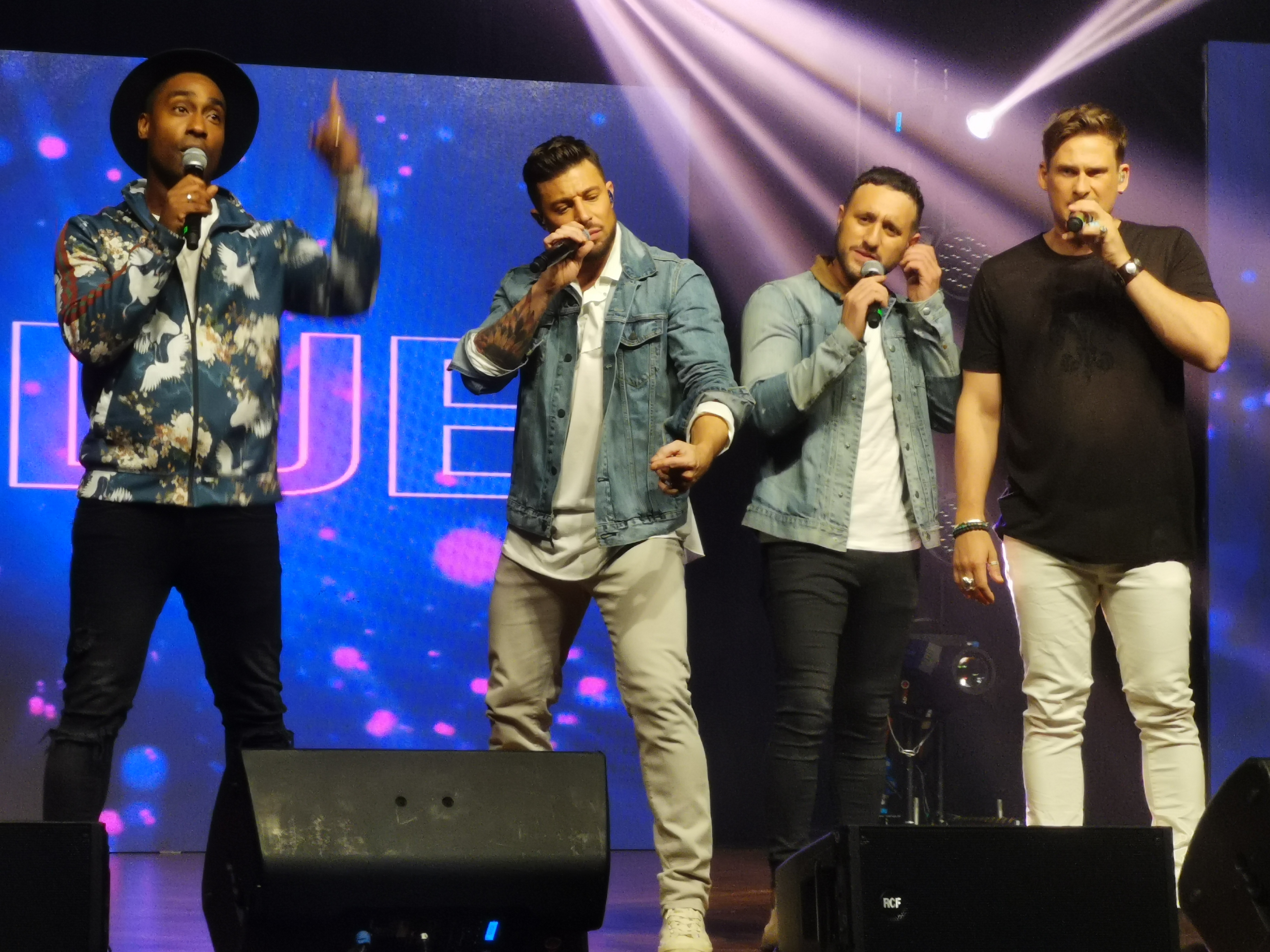
- Blue during their live concert in Kuala Lumpur, Malaysia in 2019.

Background information
- Origin: London, England
- Genres: Pop; R&B
- Years active: 2000–2005; 2011–present
- Labels: BMG Music (current); Innocent; Island; Sony; (formerly)
- Members: Simon Webbe; Duncan James; Antony Costa; Lee Ryan

Blue are an English boy band consisting of members Simon Webbe, Duncan James, Antony Costa, and Lee Ryan. The group formed in 2000 and released three studio albums before announcing a hiatus in late 2004. The group represented the United Kingdom at the Eurovision Song Contest 2011 with the song "I Can", coming in 11th place with 100 points. In 2013, it was confirmed that the group would be joining The Big Reunion, in which six groups from the past (including Liberty X, Atomic Kitten and 5ive) reform for a one-off gig. On 27 March 2013, the group announced they would embark on their first headlining tour later on in the year, their first tour in nearly ten years.

In April 2015, Blue were dropped by their record label Sony due to the poor performance of their fifth album Colours. In 2022, Blue returned with singles "Haven't Found You Yet" and "Dance with Me", both from their sixth studio album Heart & Soul, which was released on 28 October 2022.

Blue have sold 15 million records worldwide. According to the British Phonographic Industry (BPI), Blue has been certified for 3.6 million albums and 2.6 million singles in the UK.

== History ==
=== 1999–2001: Formation and All Rise ===
In May 1999, Lee Ryan and Antony Costa met at the ages of 15 and 17, respectively, when auditioning for a boy band on ITV's This Morning, with Simon Cowell putting the group together. Ryan made it into the band, as did Will Young (who would go on to win the first series of Pop Idol in 2002), although Costa was not chosen. The boy band never took off, but Ryan and Costa remained friends following their meeting.

In 2000, Costa and another one of his friends, Duncan James, formed their own band, and they were joined by Ryan. Their manager Daniel Glatman said, "Duncan came to see me with his friend, Antony Costa, who was also in the same position [wanted to be in the music industry], and they told me that they wanted to do something together. When I asked them if they had anyone in mind to work with, they said they had a friend, Lee Ryan, whom they wanted to invite to join their band. The three of them came in a couple of days later and I was completely blown away by the incredibly talented stars that stood before me." Ryan, Costa, James and Glatman all felt that something was missing and so they went on to audition for a fourth member, a position eventually filled by Ryan's flatmate, Simon Webbe.

Blue released their debut single "All Rise" in May 2001 and it reached number four on the UK Singles Chart. Their follow-up single "Too Close" was released in August 2001 and peaked at number one. Following this, the band went to New York City to film the "If You Come Back" music video, and while there, they witnessed the attacks on the World Trade Center. The following month, Blue were being interviewed by British newspaper The Sun and Ryan commented that "This New York thing is being blown out of proportion" and asked "What about whales? They are ignoring animals that are more important. Animals need saving and that's more important." The other members of the band tried to silence Ryan, but he went on. This caused a huge media backlash that resulted in Blue losing a record deal in the United States and campaigns to sack Ryan from the group. Despite the backlash, Blue went on to achieve a second number one in November with the ballad. The album All Rise was released in time for Christmas and reached number one, eventually selling in excess of 1.3 million copies in the UK. It peaked at number one on the UK Albums Chart and was certified 4× Platinum in the UK. The album spent 63 weeks on the UK top 75 Albums chart. The final single from the album, "Fly By II", reached number six in March 2002.

The album received mixed to positive reviews from critics. Sharon Mawer of AllMusic gave the album three and half stars out of five and noted, "The vocals were sung as if there was some real feeling, and that maybe is what separated Blue from their peers." Andre Paine of the NME gave the album five stars out of ten stating, when describing some of the tracks that "All of these are fine, but so as not to alienate a single teenage girl, there's also the traditional boyband slop; 'If You Come Back' ...the ballads and various Backstreet Boys rip-offs. But at least Stargate & Ray Ruffin know what they do. And Blue are young and talented enough to secure themselves a successful pop career."

=== 2002–2004: One Love and Guilty ===
Blue's second album, One Love, was released in October 2002, entering at number one on the UK Albums Chart and selling more than 150,000 copies. Three singles were released from the album: "One Love", which peaked at number three, "Sorry Seems to Be the Hardest Word", featuring vocals from Elton John, which peaked at number one, and "U Make Me Wanna", which peaked at number four. The song "Supersexual" was issued in parts of South America and Spain in order to promote the band in the region. The album peaked at number one on the UK Albums Chart, where it stayed for one week. On 20 December 2003 it was certified 4× Platinum in the UK. In June 2003, Hugh and David Nicholson of 1970s Scottish rock band Blue took the group to court, attempting to sue them and their record label EMI for £5 million. The case was a high-profile High Court case over the rights to use the name Blue. After some negotiation, the two groups agreed to drop the case and were both allowed to continue to be known as Blue and to use the name commercially.

Their third album, Guilty, was released in autumn 2003, entering at number one on the UK Albums Chart and selling 100,000 copies on the week of release. The album spawned four singles, including the title track, "Guilty", which peaked at number two, "Signed, Sealed, Delivered, I'm Yours", featuring vocals from Stevie Wonder and Angie Stone, which peaked at number 11, "Breathe Easy", which peaked at number four, and "Bubblin'", which peaked at number nine. The album ended up selling more than 1 million copies in the UK alone. The song "The Gift" was released to promote the album in Japan.

It was released on 3 November 2003 in the United Kingdom and on 25 November in the United States. It debuted at number one on the UK Singles Chart after its release, and it was certified 2× Platinum in December 2003.

The album was particularly successful in the UK, Europe, Japan and New Zealand. "Guilty", "Signed, Sealed, Delivered I'm Yours", "Breathe Easy" and "Bubblin'" were released as singles from the album. "Guilty", co-written by Gary Barlow, was the most successful single from the album, peaking at number two in the UK.

=== 2004–05: Best of Blue and hiatus ===
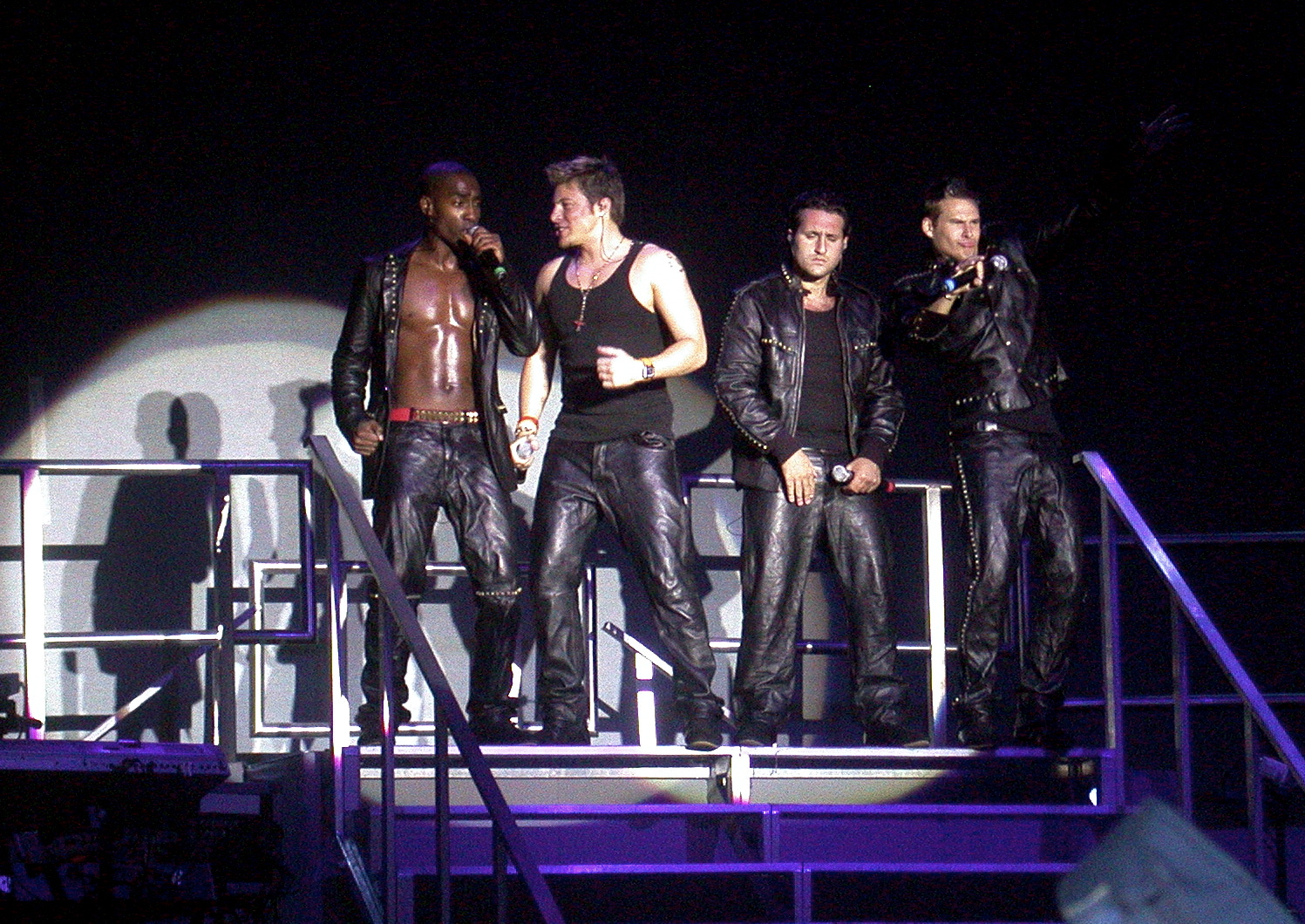
Blue performing on their Greatest Hits Tour, in 2005.

In November 2004, the band released Best of Blue, a greatest hits compilation. The album spawned the singles "Curtain Falls", which peaked at No. 4 in the UK, "Get Down on It" and "Only Words I Know", which peaked at No. 2 in France and Italy. The album peaked at No. 2 on the UK Albums Chart and was awarded a double platinum certification. Following the release of Best of Blue, group members Simon Webbe and Antony Costa made the decision to release an album compiling a selection of the group's B-sides, remixes and previously unreleased material. The album also includes three tracks only previously released in Japan: "The Gift", "It's Alright" and "Elements". The album also includes band member Duncan James' duet single, "I Believe My Heart". By the indication of the album booklet, a live version of "Lonely This Christmas" from CD:UK was intended to be track seven on the album, however, it was removed from the track listing for unknown reasons. The album was released in July 2005, becoming available in several European countries, as well as Japan, Thailand and China, but was not released in the UK. In 2005, the group announced that they would go into hiatus to devote themselves to solo careers for some time. In 2009, the band planned a return, but it never happened at the time.

=== 2011–2012: Return and Eurovision Song Contest ===
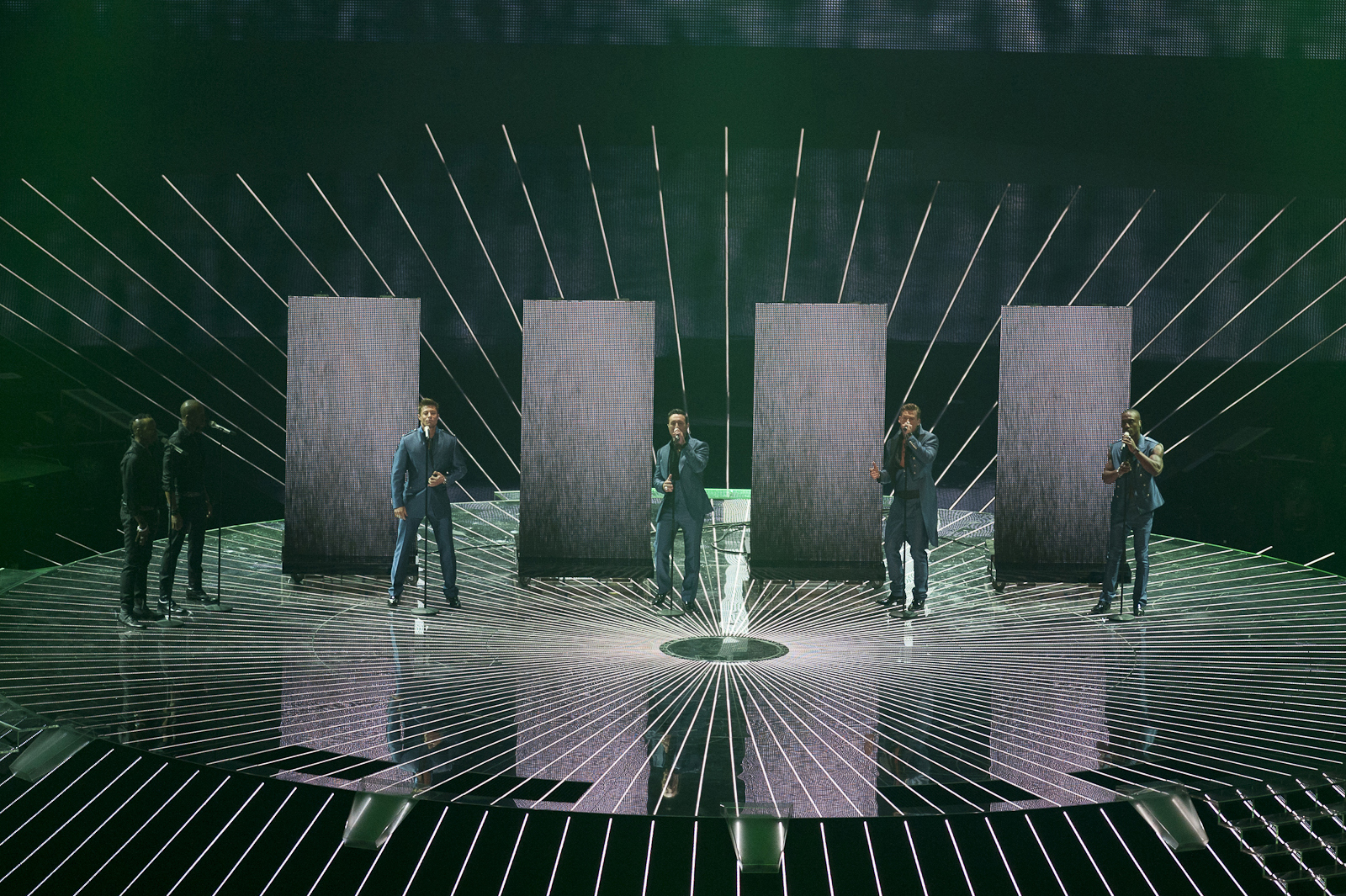
Blue performing at the final of the Eurovision Song Contest 2011 in Düsseldorf, Germany on 14 May 2011.

It was announced on 29 January 2011 that Blue would reunite and also represent the United Kingdom in the Eurovision Song Contest 2011, with their entry "I Can". It coincided with the tenth anniversary of the establishment of the band in 2001 and a one-hour documentary, Eurovision: Your Country Needs Blue, was broadcast in April 2011 celebrated their preparations for the final. It was the third time the group has Eurovision ambitions as group member Lee Ryan wrote and composed "Guardian Angel", Andy Scott-Lee's song for the 2005 edition of Making Your Mind Up. Furthermore, Antony Costa came second in the 2006 edition of the show with the song "It's A Beautiful Thing". Group member Duncan James was a panellist on all episodes of the Eurovision: Your Country Needs You series in 2009, which Jade Ewen won. He also announced the UK votes in the Eurovision Song Contest 2009 final.

Blue became the first UK representatives since The Shadows in 1975 to have had multiple no.1 singles in the UK chart prior to appearing in Eurovision, and the first since Sonia in 1993 to have had a no.1 at all before entering the competition. The song "I Can" premiered on 11 March 2011, on The Graham Norton Show. In the contest, they came 11th with 100 points. After the contest Blue said they were the victims of political voting, claiming they would have finished higher if countries had voted for the performance rather than their neighbours. It was later revealed that, when the European Broadcasting Union (who runs Eurovision) released the split Televote & Jury results, Blue were in 5th place in the televote, with the final result down to finishing in 22nd place on the jury vote. Duncan James insisted that the result of their Eurovision bid won't affect their UK comeback, adding: "Should the worst happen, we're still going to press ahead with the album. It won't be the last of us – we're all fully committed to this band again."

The band revealed during an interview that they had recorded a collaboration with American R&B superstar Bruno Mars for their upcoming fourth studio album. Discussing the record with Digital Spy, Lee Ryan said: "We've been writing with Ne-Yo, and I've written at least a couple of songs on my own that will probably make the album. We've also been working with Bruno Mars on a song called "Black and Blue" – he's sending his parts over from a demo we recorded a while ago. It's got some haunting notes on the chorus." They also revealed that three tracks on the album had been produced by RedOne and that they felt that the material was "their best work to date". During February 2012, the band embarked on a small tour across Manila, performing with fellow boyband A1 and Jeff Timmons in three special concerts, two of which included the Smart Araneta Coliseum on 25 February 2012, and the Singapore Indoor Stadium on 28 February. The tour was billed as "Boybands: The Greatest Hits Tour".

=== 2012–2019: Roulette and Colours ===
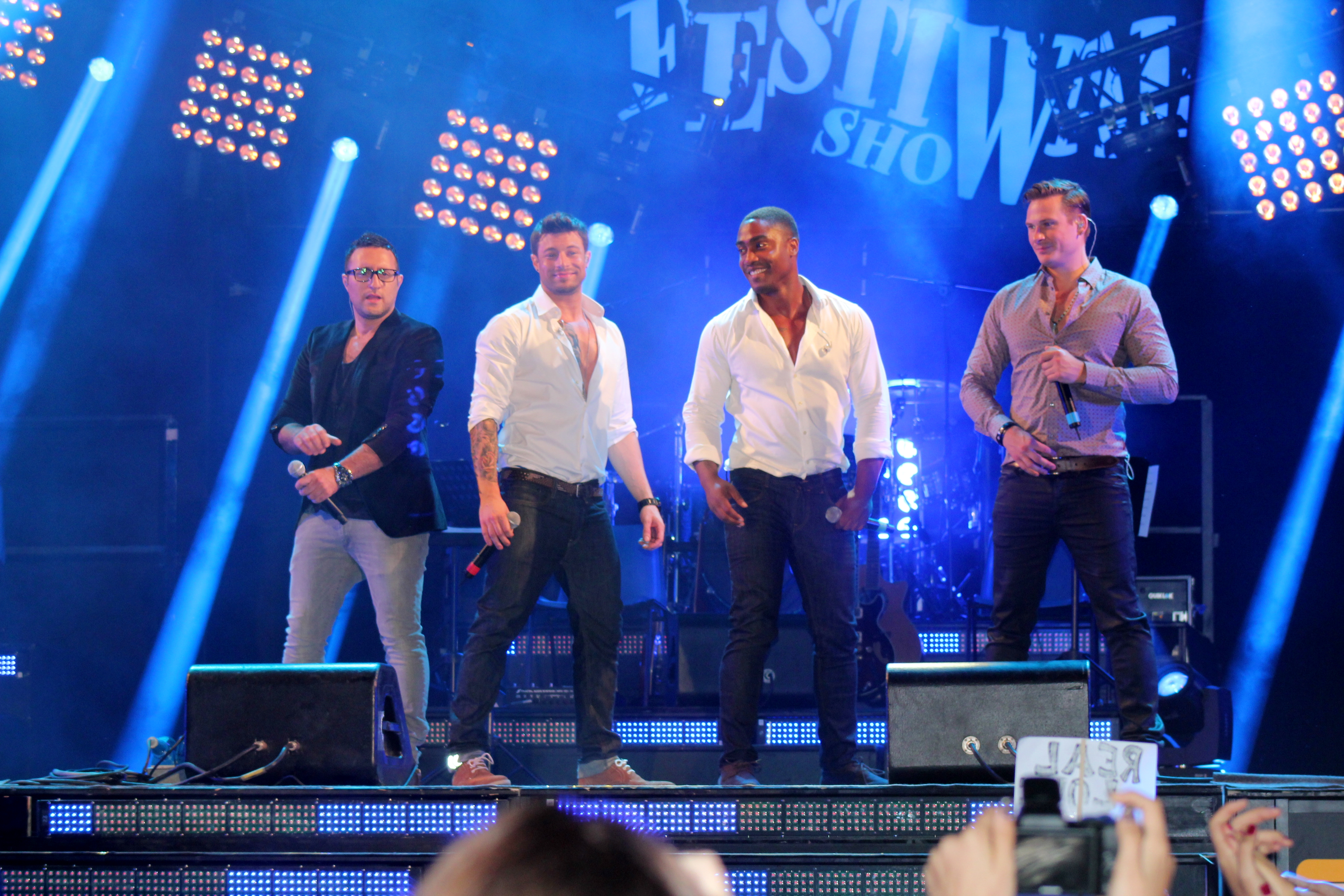
Blue performing in Italy in 2013

On 22 June 2012, the band premiered their new song, "Hurt Lovers", during a concert in China. In an interview shortly after the concert, the band claimed that "Hurt Lovers" was one of the first tracks they recorded after re-uniting, and that it was an obvious choice for their comeback single. It received positive reception across Asia, before being officially premiered in Germany on 6 October 2012. Thus, the creators of the film Break Up Man approached the band, and asked if the song could be used as the official theme for the film. Thus, the track will receive an early release on 4 January 2013, before being released across the world later in the year. In promotion of the single, the band performed it live on Vocea României on 4 December 2012, as well as embarking on an acoustic radio tour across six cities in Germany. In October 2012, the group confirmed via their official Facebook page that the title of their fourth studio album would be Roulette. It was also revealed that the album will receive an early release in Germany, being made available from 25 January 2013. The band shot the album's artwork in a deserted casino in November 2012. On 21 February 2013, it was confirmed that the group would join ITV2's reality series The Big Reunion.

The bands were originally only supposed to perform a one-off concert at London's Hammersmith Apollo on 26 February 2013, but the entire show sold out in under five minutes shortly after the premiere of the first episode on 31 January 2013. A DVD of the Hammersmith Apollo concert will be released in April 2013. On 11 February, it was confirmed that following high ticket demands and the popularity of The Big Reunion, a full 12-date UK tour would be taking place from 3–12 May 2013. On 28 April 2013, Roulette was released in United Kingdom and Ireland. . "I Can" was released as the band's comeback single. The track was also used as the United Kingdom's entry for the Eurovision Song Contest 2011, which was held in Düsseldorf, Germany. The song came 11th in the contest, scoring 100 points. The single was released on 1 May 2011 as a digital download, with the physical release the day after. The track peaked at number 16 on the UK Singles Chart, becoming Blue's lowest-charting single in the United Kingdom to date. The song was written by group members Duncan James and Lee Ryan with Ciaron Bell, Ben Collier, Ian Hope, Liam Keenan, and Norwegian production team StarSign. It was produced by Ronny Svendsen and Hallgeir Rustan, the latter who previously produced several of Blue's hit singles.

"Hurt Lovers" was released as the official lead single from the album on 4 January 2013, in Germany, three weeks prior to the release of the album in the country. The track also serves as the official theme for the German film Break Up Man. In an interview, the band claimed that "Hurt Lovers" was one of the first tracks they recorded after re-uniting, and that it was an obvious choice for the band's reunion single. The track was co-written by the band, along with Jez Ashurst, David Jost, Martin Schmidt and Alexander Zuckowski. The band first premiered the song during a concert in China on 22 June 2012. It received positive reception across Asia, before being officially premiered in Germany on 6 October 2012. The creators of the film Break Up Man approached the band, and asked if the song could be used as the official theme for the film. Thus, the track received an early release in Germany on 4 January 2013, before being released across the world later in the year. In promotion of the single, the band performed it live on The Voice of Romania, as well as embarking on an acoustic radio tour across six cities in Germany. "Without You" was released as the second single from the album on 16 May 2013 only in Germany, Swiss and Austria. The music video premiered the same day.

"Break My Heart" was released as the third single from the album on 29 June for radio premiere and 5 August 2013 for digital download. The single was released as official single only in Germany and promotional radio single on United Kingdom. The music video was premiered on 18 August. The song was released as the third single in the United Kingdom as part of the Roulette Summer Edition EP on 2 September 2013. "Broken" and "Ayo" was released as the fourth and fifth single in the United Kingdom and Ireland in the same day: 2 February 2014. The music video for "Broken" premiered on 31 January 2013.

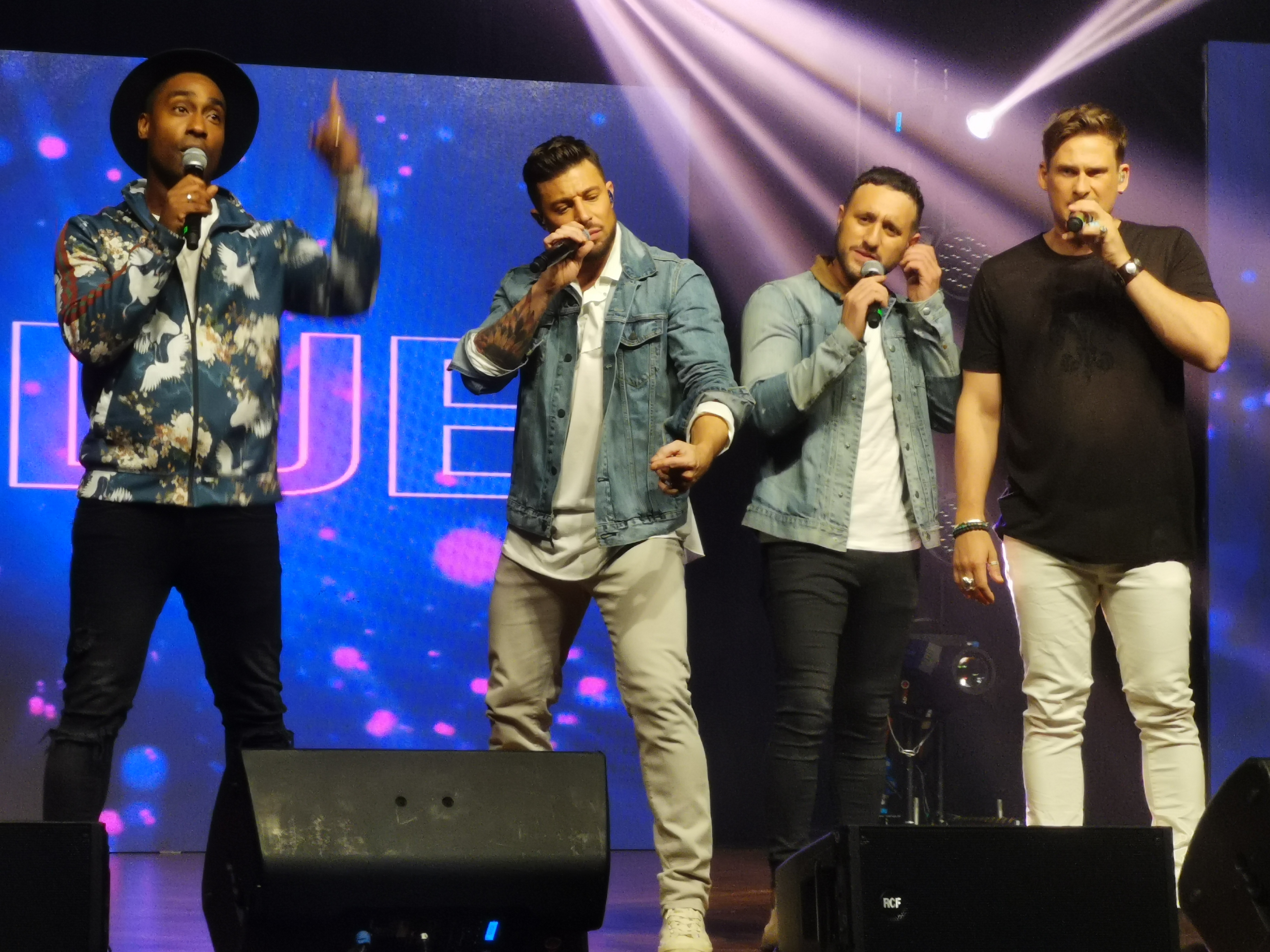
Blue during their live concert in Kuala Lumpur, Malaysia in 2019.

On 16 May, the band released "Without You" as the second single from the album only in Germany, Swiss and Austria. The music video premiered the same day. "Break My Heart" was released as the third single from the album on 29 June for radio premiere and 5 August 2013 for digital download. The single was released as official single only in Germany and promotional radio single on United Kingdom. The music video was premiered on 18 August. Blue starred in their own TV programme on ITV2 called Blue Go Mad in Ibiza, which followed the band as they ran their own bar out in Ibiza. Little did they know that they were being pranked, everybody involved with the bar excluding Blue themselves were actors who purposely made things as awkward as possible.

In November 2014, Blue announced they had signed a two-album record deal with Sony Music, starting with their fifth studio album Colours released on 9 March 2015. The album underperformed, which resulted in the band being dropped by the record label in April. Blue then embarked on a 16-date tour around the United Kingdom during March and April 2015. On 9 May 2015 Blue performed at VE Day 70: A Party to Remember in Horse Guards Parade, London, dressed as World War II RAF officers. In summer 2017 the group started recording their next album, but the project was canceled when Sony Music did not renew the contract. After that, the band decided only to go on tour for the next few years, alternating with his solo projects – Antony Costa and James focused on the acting career and Ryan and Webbe released solo songs. In 2019, the band said they had no plans to release new material; they intended to only tour.

=== 2021–present: Heart & Soul, 20th Anniversary Tour and Reflections ===
On 30 November 2021, the group confirmed they would be going on an arena tour to celebrate their 20th anniversary, it was also confirmed that Atomic Kitten would be supporting them on the tour. When interviewed on This Morning the group also confirmed that they were back in the studio recording, a new album is expected to follow along with the tour.

On 11 April 2022, the group announced that their sixth studio album Heart & Soul which would be released on 9 September 2022. On 20 May the group unveiled the track listing for the album on their social media accounts, following with first single "Haven't Found You Yet". On 29 June 2022, the group released the single "Dance with Me", a cover of the 2001 112 single. The Heart & Soul album release date was pushed back to 28 October 2022.

In November 2022, Blue performed at a fan festival in Qatar for the 2022 FIFA World Cup. The appearance attracted criticism due to Qatar's human rights abuses and strict anti-LGBT laws.

On 4 September 2025 the group premiered their new single "One Last Time" on Radio 2 with Scott Mills. Later on their socials, Blue announced their upcoming album Reflections, which was released on 9 January 2026 alongside them going on their 25th Anniversary Tour. "One Last Time" was co-written by James and debuted and peaked at number 62 on the UK Singles Downloads Chart. A second single, "Waste My Love", co-written by Webbe, was issued on 30 October 2025. "Beautiful Spiritual", co-written by Ryan, was released as the album's third single on 27 November 2025. A fourth single, "Candlelight Fades", co-written by Costa, was released on 19 December 2025. Reflections was released on 9 January 2026; it debuted at number two on the UK Album Charts, the group's highest charting studio album since 2003's Guilty.

In September 2026, Blue released "You Should Know" as the fifth single from Reflections. The song, written by Simon Webbe, received airplay on BBC Radio 2, which added it to its A-list. Its music video was filmed in Dundee, Scotland, and premiered on 23 September 2026. The single peaked at number 75 on the UK Singles Sales Chart and number 11 on the UK Physical Singles Chart.

== Discography ==
Studio albums

- All Rise (2001)
- One Love (2002)
- Guilty (2003)
- Roulette (2013)
- Colours (2015)
- Heart & Soul (2022)
- Reflections (2026)

== Tours ==
Headlining

- One Love Tour (2002–2003)
- Guilty Tour (2003–2004)
- Best of Blue Tour (2005)
- Roulette Tour (2013)
- Colours of Blue Tour (2015–2016)
- 20th Anniversary / Heart & Soul Tour (2022–2023)
- Greatest Hits Tour (2024)
- 25th Anniversary Tour (2025–2026)

Co-headlining

- The Big Reunion (with various artists) (2013)
- The Big Reunion Boy Band Tour (with various artists) (2014)

Warm Up

- Olly Murs - 15 Years of Hits (2025)

== Awards and nominations ==
Year	Nominee / work	Award	Result
2001	"All Rise"	The Record of the Year for Best Single	Nominated
2001	Blue	TMF Award for Best Breakthrough Artist/Newcomer	Won
2002	Blue	Brit Award for British Breakthrough Act	Won
2002	Blue	Brit Award for British Pop Act	Nominated
2003	Blue	Brit Award for British Group	Nominated
2003	Blue	Brit Award for British Pop Act	Won
2003	Blue	MTV Asia Award for Favorite Pop Act	Won
2003	Blue	MTV Asia Award for Favorite Breakthrough Artist	Nominated
2004	Blue	MTV Asia Award for Favorite Pop Act	Won
2005	Blue	MTV Asia Award for Favorite Pop Act	Nominated

Preceded by Josh Dubovie with "That Sounds Good to Me"	UK in the Eurovision Song Contest; 2011	Succeeded by Engelbert Humperdinck with "Love Will Set You Free"
