= Eurovision: Your Country Needs Blue =

2011 British television documentary

- Genre: Music documentary
- Written by: Rob Colley
- Narrated by: Graham Norton
- Country of origin: United Kingdom
- Original language: English
- No. of episodes: 1

Production
- Executive producer: Phil Parsons
- Running time: 60 minutes
- Production company: BBC Productions

Original release
- Network: BBC One, BBC One HD
- Release: 16 April 2011

Related
- Eurovision: Your Country Needs You, Eurovision Song Contest

Eurovision: Your Country Needs Blue is a documentary that aired on BBC One on 16 April 2011. It was narrated by Graham Norton.

The documentary focused on Blue and how they managed to represent the United Kingdom in the Eurovision Song Contest 2011. Archive clips from Eurovision were included and contributions came from (amongst others): Cliff Richard, Lulu, John Barrowman, Aston Merrygold, Marvin Humes, Arlene Phillips, Scott Mills, Robin Gibb, David Arnold and Bucks Fizz
