= Ken Gladman =

Australian rules footballer

Personal information
- Full name: Ken Gladman
- Born: 14 January 1946
- Original team: Mortlake
- Height: 183 cm (6 ft 0 in)
- Weight: 79 kg (174 lb)
- Position: Centre / Flank

Playing career^{1}
Years	Club	Games (Goals)
1966–70	Geelong	49 (9)
- ^{1} Playing statistics correct to the end of 1970.

Ken Gladman (born 14 January 1946) is a former Australian rules footballer who played with Geelong in the Victorian Football League (VFL).
