= Gladman's Procession =

1443 procession or revolt in Norwich, England

- Date: 22 January 1443
- Location: Norwich, England
- Caused by: Opposition to arbitration decisions in favour of Norwich Cathedral priory

Parties
| City of Norwich | Norwich Cathedral priory |

Lead figures
| William Hempstede (Mayor of Norwich); John Gladman | John Heverlond (Norwich Cathedral prior); Thomas Wetherby |

Gladman's Procession, also variably known as a Gladman's Riding, Parade, or Insurrection, was a procession in the city of Norwich, England, followed by an alleged revolt against the Norwich Cathedral priory by the citizens of the city on 22 January 1443.

The procession took place in response to a June 1442 arbitration decision by the Earl of Suffolk who ruled against the City of Norwich and in favour of the Norwich Cathedral priory on issues including disputed areas of jurisdiction, court revenues, the priory's organisation of the Pentecost fair, the destruction of nearby mills, and the city's surrender of grazing rights.

Three days prior to a scheduled city assembly, the Mayor of Norwich William Hempstede and the city commonality of possibly 3,000 people gathered in the city to the sound of church bells. Local merchant or smith John Gladman rode on a horse, by the city's account as the King of Christmas and by the priory's account "like a crowned king", leading a hundred people. The crowd entered the Guildhall and stole the common seal to prevent the sealing of the arbitration document, before going to the cathedral, by the priory's account laying violent siege to the cathedral precinct when the prior John Heverlond and his servants locked its gates. At 4 pm on the afternoon of 23 January, Heverlond surrendered copies of his claims of the lands, and the crowd left the cathedral gates to form a procession around the wider city walls, closing and locking these gates. Days later, the Duke of Norfolk arrived and was able to reopen the gates under command from the King.

Accounts of the event come from three sources; indictments by the priory on 28 February 1443 which portray the procession as violent and treasonous, a c. 1448 defence by the city available in three different drafts which portrays it as an innocent instance of a customary Shrove Tuesday celebration, and a 1482 narrative of events in the Liber Albus of the city. Historians have debated the large differences between these accounts' portrayals of events.

== Background ==
Norwich at the time was England's second largest city. Precedent in Norwich for a demonstrative procession took place in 1418, when the Norwich Cathedral prior alleged that the Mayor of Norwich and several other people had led an armed procession to Trowse Water; here, they allegedly fished the river using dragnets from the city's barge and caught £10 of fish. They then were said to have processed back to the city, shouting "We are in possession by right and by our liberties of this City of Norwich we have caught them and kept them", and then distributed the fish amongst Norwich's community.

Over the early 15th century, Norwich's wealthy citizens vied for more control over city governance, though this was resisted by the city's common council. During aldermanic elections in 1404, 1413, the Common Seal's application was repeatedly found to have been badly applied or forged. Norwich was particularly home to prominent disputes in the 1430s and early 1440s, largely between the city and its ecclesiastical neighbours. In 1433, there was a disputed election; the outgoing Mayor of Norwich Thomas Wetherby, (Note: Wetherby had been elected mayor the previous year, 1432, as well as in 1427.) alongside a few allies, were accused of trying to choose the new mayor themselves by a small collection of citizens. After the city assembly decided to choose its own mayoral candidate to oppose Wetherby, Bishop of Norwich William Alnwick mediated the dispute and decided in the assembly's favour before bringing charges against Wetherby and five co-conspirators; Wetherby lost his aldermanship and his allies lost their rights to plea in city courts, hold city office, and involve themselves in city assemblies. By 1437, Wetherby's faction had largely returned to influence due to the elected mayor of 1436 making strides to restore them to their former ranks. This in turn triggered a riot at the 1437 mayoral election when a significant number of citizens stopped Wetherby and his allies from taking part; Wetherby named sixteen aldermen and important citizens of leading this group. The King took control of the liberties of the city and appointed a governing warden after this incident, though the liberties were quickly regained. In the 1432 and 1437 aldermanic elections, the Common Seal was again both times found to have been badly applied or applied in forgery.

Another political battle was between the city and priory over jurisdictional matters, namely over the disputed areas of Ratonrowe, Tombland, Holmstreet, and Normanslord. Furthermore, the abbot of St Benet's Hulme made the assertion that Norwich's New Mills, grain mills that were situated on the River Wensum, caused interference to mills at on his own manor; this particular dispute threatened the food supply for the people of Norwich. Wetherby, by then former Mayor of Norwich, was a significant player in these disputes, and there were many instances of vandalism, jail breaking and brawling instigated by both the city and priory, particularly a 1436 incident when some of the prior's servants broke into the mayor's personal garden and stole some of his trees.

=== Arbitration by the Earl of Suffolk ===
By October 1441, the Norwich corporation made an agreement that they would submit to the Earl of Suffolk's arbitration as part of an effort to reach a settlement in many of the disputes. All parties involved agreed to abide by the terms of his arbitration decision in advance, as a precondition of the arbitration itself.

Issued in June 1442, Suffolk's verdict was that the City of Norwich would be obliged to relinquish its claims to the disputed areas. The decision was expected to deprive the city of that year's court revenues. The verdict on jurisdiction would lead to the potential for the continued proceeding of the Pentecost fair, which allowed the Norwich Cathedral priory to gain control of the entire city during its observance. It was subsequently rumoured by Norwich inhabitants that the prior, John Heverlond, would introduce new customs such as taxing the washing of cloth by the river and the bringing of food into the city. The Mayor, Sheriffs and Commonalty were to enter into £50 bonds with the bishop and prior, and were to be bound in £100. This obliged them to observe all of the decisions that would be made when it came to issues between the abbot and themselves. The Earl also ordered the new mills to be made dysfunctional prior to 30 April 1443, respecting the commands from St Benet's. He mandated that the city give up its grazing rights in several outlying hamlets, as well as the paying of rents on several different city properties, such as the Common Staithe. When read to the commons, it is stated in the Liber Albus that:

they under stode by the warde that they shulde loos the myllys whyche shulde be an utter desolacion for the Cyte And shulde cause the pepyll to goo owte of the Cyte".

In response, reluctant to agree to these consequences, the city corporation attempted a number of legal counters, but by January 1443, matters came to a head. According to the account in the Liber Albus, pressured the corporation was pressured toward calling an assembly by supporters of Wetherby as well as the Abbot's Council, likely for 25 January, (Note: Though the Liber Albus account reads as though the assembly was called immediately, Chris Humphrey has noted that this likely was not the case as the city Custumal recommended for assemblies to be called on holy days to encourage a full turnout, particularly from merchants; the common assembly was likely scheduled for 25 January.) during which the bond decided in the arbitration could be sealed.

William Hempstede was Mayor of Norwich at the time of the incident. Several of the aldermen who would be sitting in the Guildhall at the time of Gladman's Procession had been previously accused of various malfeasances.

== Incident ==
=== Gladman's procession ===
On or after Tuesday 22 January 1443 but prior to the scheduled 25 January city assembly, (Note: According to the priory's account of events, on 22 January the mayor and commonality "then and there arranged for John Gladman of the said city, merchant, to ride in the city on a horse, like a crowned king". While Chris Humphrey took this to mean that the procession definitely began on 22 January, Tom Pettitt has argued that it may have been that day or any day prior to the alleged insurrection on 25 January.) Gladman's Procession took place. According to the priory, Mayor Hempstede and the commonality "arranged for John Gladman of the said city, merchant, to ride in the city on a horse, like a crowned king". John Gladman was a local merchant of the city, though was possibly a smith; he was a brother of Saint George's Guild, and the powerful Bachery Guild. Before him, the priory's account alleges that three unknown men carried a sceptre and sword, and the city's account also mentions a diadem, possibly carried by the third man. Gladman was accompanied by individuals appearing to act as the crown's valets, and was followed by a hundred more people either on foot and on horseback. The city's account declares that there was an intention for Gladman to ride "crowned as King of Kristmesse", though also notes that representations of the seasons were in the procession in front of him and with the figure of Lent behind him. It states that he was "cladde in white with redde herrings skinnes and his hors trapped with oyster shelles after him". One draft of the city's account elaborates that the horse was wrapped with tin foil as well as "other wyse dysgysy thynggis", and another draft notes that it was decorated "with smale bladders puddynges and lynkes", though the latter was later crossed out.

=== Alleged insurrection ===
The priory's indictments allege that on 25 January, 3,000 armed men, along with Mayor Hempstede, were summoned to gather in the city, and "to come together in bands and to make a violent insurrection throughout the entire city". The alleged conspirators did this by ringing the city's bells so as to raise alarm. (Note: The original Latin description of the bell ringing, available through notes in the translated versions of the text, reads campanas vice versa pulsarunt, with vice versa according to Tom Pettitt meaning 'out of turn' which would have made a jangling sound.) The priory alleged that "They went around urging people in the city to come together and to make an insurrection and riots there", and that it was shouted, "Let us burn the priory, and kill the prior and monks". Most of the people later named to the oyer and terminer by the prior as taking part in the incident on the city's side were craftsmen and traders, seen as 'commons' in Norwich's urban hierarchy, or those who had possession of freedom of the city; those who were at least somewhat well-to-do. Those later indicted were most likely leading figures of the 28 different trades listed. Most were of at least middling status in the civic body, and only a few labourers and servants were named. Robert Toppes, John Cambridge, and William Ashwell were involved; they were prominent and had already opposed Wetherby in the past.

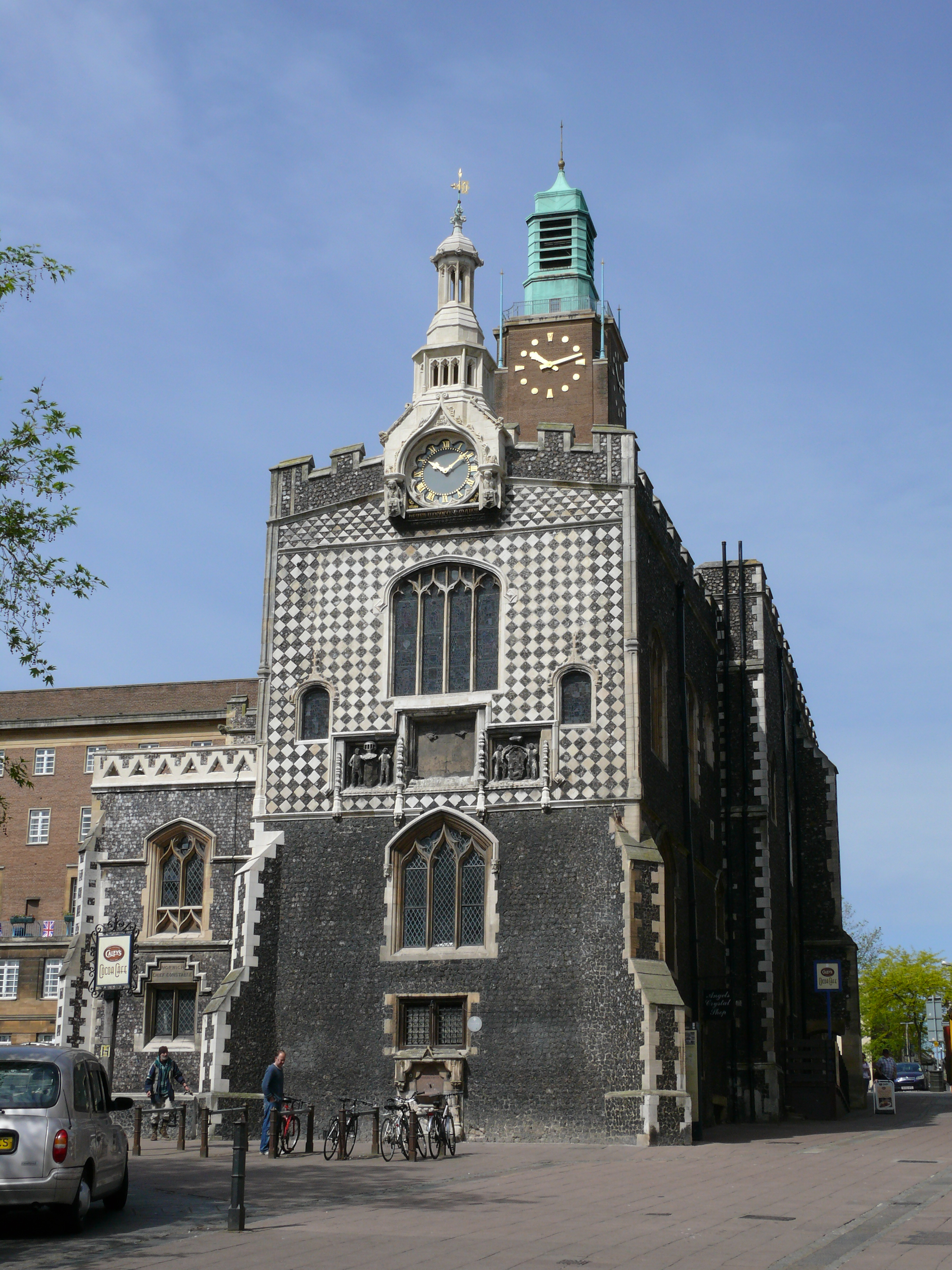
Norwich Guildhall, from which the priory alleged the city's common seal was stolen

It is alleged by the priory account that the crowd broke into Norwich Guildhall and stole its common seal to prevent the sealing of the arbitration document. After removing the seal, it was written in the priory account that they marched to the Cathedral precinct gates as church bells rang. The prior and his servants closed and locked the gates in response, keeping the protesters out but themselves inside. As such, the citizens purportedly placed the priory under a siege; according to the priory, during this occupation the protesters uprooted and took the prior's pillory, located either outside the prior's gate in Holmestreet, or more likely in Tombland. They additionally destroyed the prior's prison also situated at Tombland. The prior's pillory had been uprooted once before, in 1277. Its removal may have been a challenge to the prior's right to hold the Assizes of Bread and Ale, and thus the Pentecost Fair, as this was when the pillory was used. In addition, a cannon was allegedly pointed at the cathedral by the citizens, who additionally were accused of starting to dig a tunnel under its walls.

The alleged rioters stayed at the gates until 4 pm the following afternoon, when prior Heverlond surrendered copies of his claims of the lands in the arbitration document as well as a number of evidences, which included an indenture made in 1429. Following this, they moved in a procession around the wider city walls, closing and locking its gates. On this route, they would have passed the two main places of execution outside the city walls; Lollards Pit and the Magdalene gallows, and also encircled the New Mills, asserting them at part of the city. The citizens held the city gates closed for several days.

== Aftermath ==
Days later, the Duke of Norfolk later arrived and demanded the city gates be opened in the King's name. The citizens opened the gates.

Gladman's Procession is considered by historians such as Chris Humphrey as unsuccessful in the short term. Following the incident, the Abbot and Wetherby accused Mayor Hempstede and the citizens of rioting and committing insurrection. Proclaiming that the Mayor and the other involved citizens were traitors, they had them arrested. A London sergeant-at-arms confronted Benedict Joly, from Norwich; when Joly stated his origin in Norwich, this sergeant said "that he was a traytour And a Ryser ageynst the Kyng And that he was one of thoo[se] for to make a newe Kyng And so he ledde hym forth to pryson." In February, Hempstede rode to Greenwich with others to ask for the Duke of Gloucester's aid. Hempstede appeared "be fore the lords" on 13 February at Westminster, only to be committed to the Fleet Prison and receive a £50 fine. He remained in this prison until 26 March, and Wetherby and his supporters ruled the city in his absence.

On 28 February, the priory's inquest was held at Thetford. The Liber Albus account purports that on 4 March, Thomas Delrow, an appointment of Wetherby's who represented Mayor Hempstede in his absence as well as the sheriffs and commonality, took back their plea "at the request of the seid Thomas Wedyrby and his adherents"; it is unclear what the city's defence at the time would have been. The judges did not sentence any of the protesters with capital punishment, only issuing individual punishments as fines. On 10 March, Wetherby and his supporters used the common seal to seal the obligations to the abbot and prior of St Benet's as well as to bishop Hempstede. Wetherby had the mills that had been subject to the earlier arbitration flooded; the damage was such that the city's bakers had to make use of mills ten miles from the city. The Crown then intervened; On 14 March, Norwich's liberties and franchises were seized again. From this point until late 1447, the city was under the governance of Norfolk gentry member Sir John Clifton, who also held Buckenham Castle, in the name of Henry VI.

In the long term, the incident did not significantly affect the city. Suffolk's 1442 award was never sealed properly; this was because the document was declared void due to the arrest of Mayor Hempstede as he was in prison when it was sealed. The broken mills were repaired by the city after 1447, the liberties and franchises of the city were restored on 12 November that year following a 1,000 mark payment. In 1448, the city wrote their own defence of the incident.

The factional disputes that had developed in the city were, in 1452, mediated by Justice Yelverton, as Wetherby had died. This led to the common councillors and aldermen of Norwich being united as part of the Guild of Saint George, when the guild was joined with the city government, an idea that Ben R. McRee has argued was possibly first inculcated by the initial aftermath of Gladman's Procession. In 1481, the city re-argued its case with the Abbott of St Benet's. With Cardinal Wolsey dispatched to arbitrate, the city renegotiated its dispute with the priory from 1517 to 1524. This ended in a more favourable settlement, in which Wolsey concluded that the city should hold jurisdiction in all land that stood between the cathedral precinct and the city walls, and the priory was to retain rights in the suburbs beyond the city walls. These boundaries were roughly the same as those demarcated in the procession.

== Differing contemporary accounts ==
Knowledge of the procession is largely present in three contemporary or semi-contemporary accounts; the priory's, the city's, and the Liber Albus. Both the accounts from the priory and the citizens contain significant contradictory elements and distorted truths. There is a third account of the events in the city's Liber Albus, which was written in 1482, 39 years later. All three are selective in leaving out some information that the others retain. Aside from these, the patent rolls in the city leave little trace of what took place, and accounts of the event are very few outside the law courts.

=== Priory's account ===
The two indictments taken at the 28 February 1443 inquest at Thetford are the earliest surviving account of events. Their narrative is led by the prior of Norwich Cathedral and his sympathisers. The inquest itself was by Sir Thomas Tudenham and John Heydon. Derek Crosby has argued that it portrayed the procession as "organised, militarised and treasonous," with a motive to undermine future claims to the city's disputed territories and encourage harsh punishment. It frames the procession itself as challenge to, or even a usurpation of, royal authority. At this inquest, the city did not produce their own version of events. The original Latin text is no longer extant, though there are English translations by historians Norman Tanner as well as W. Hudson and J.C. Tingey.

=== City's account ===
In c. 1448, five years after the incident, the city wrote a defence of the incident as part of a presentment against Wetherby's faction. This details the wrongs that it claimed Tudenham and Heydon, as well as allies of Wetherby and others, had allegedly committed against the mayor, aldermen and commonalty of Norwich. The city's account was motivated by their attempts to declare innocence, and to mitigate the punishments to which the city and officers were subject. The account claims that the procession was a festivity that was wrongly accused as treasonous, and argues that Gladman had specifically only been involved in a customary Shrove Tuesday ('fastyngong Tuesday') celebration. The account argues that the King of Christmas was already a well-established Norwich custom, and purports that no violence took place whatsoever, leaving out any suggestion toward insurrection. There are at least three distinct and surviving drafts of the defence in the Norfolk Record Office. All have different alterations including deletions and additions.

== Historiography ==
The causes and meaning of the event are debated among historians. Crosby has argued that the procession attempted to display the benefits of common agency and unity to the civic body, in a similar way to other civic, guild and religious pageants at the time, such as the city's St George's Guild pageant and the local Corpus Christi procession. He has said that "Having the King of Christmas break into the Guildhall and take away the seal was a direct accusation by the protesters that the aldermen [...] had ruled badly and had themselves become agents of misrule". He has also written that the procession was territorial, and "involved symbolically and physically driving back the prior's influence." While Humphrey has written that the risk to the food supply was a significant factor, Crosby has gone further to state that it also acted as a "tangible proxy for a number of other grievances".

Philippa Maddern has made the argument that the account from the priory of a violent siege does not concur with the surviving evidence, as the only known damage dealt was to the prison and stocks of the priory. Equally, Tom Pettitt has made the case that the city's account of a spectacle involving figures of Lent and the twelve months did not take place, and that it was more likely a demonstration in opposition to political crisis. Despite this, he has compared the city's representation of Gladman's Procession to various European processions, including Italian custom I Mesi, the tradition in Bagnoli del Trigno in Isernia, Italy, the traditional celebration in Cercepiccola in which decorated characters speak while on the backs of similarly decorated donkeys, and most closely to the tradition of Riesi, Sicily.

Humphrey, while using the term 'procession', has said that the incident is should "more appropriately" be called Gladman's Riding.

=== Portrayal as a Shrove Tuesday celebration ===
Maddern has argued that the city's portrayal of the procession as a Shrove Tuesday celebration must have been a false cover story, because 25 January was five weeks before Shrove Tuesday. Tom Pettitt has argued that the city's account does not necessarily state that the procession took place on Shrove Tuesday, noting that there is syntactic ambiguity in that account, possibly deliberately so, as well as other obfuscations among its drafts. Humphrey has argued that its placement on Shrove Tuesday would have been too much of a misrepresentation to pass off successfully. He has instead suggested that the citizens were dissatisfied with their present situation, and so may have instead attempted to use the imagery associated with Shrove Tuesday in their procession so as to demonstrate this through a "symbolic dramatisation of their own predicament." The symbolism expressed in the procession may have brought to mind analogies such as an early declaration of Lent (and thus fasting), given the threat to the city's mills and anxieties around the food supply. He has also said this would have allowed them to plead that their actions were harmless, which did take place.
