= Daniel Glatman =

British music manager

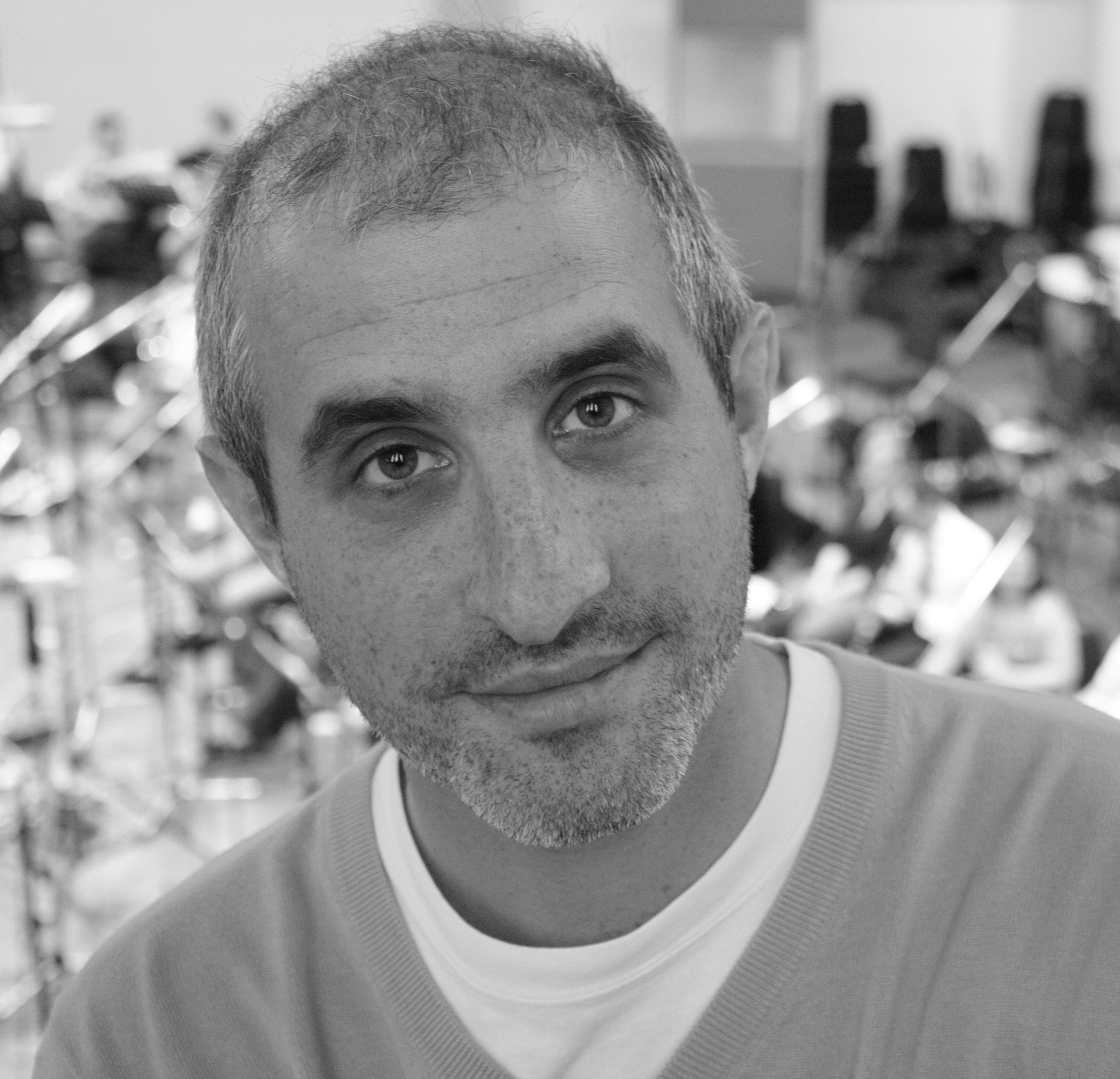
- Born: 27 June 1975 (age 49)
- Other names: Danny Glatman
- Occupation: Music manager

Daniel Glatman (born 27 June 1975) is an English pop music manager, best known for co-creating and managing the boy band Blue.

Among the artists he has represented are the Fron Male Voice Choir, signed in 2006 after Glatman heard them perform at a wedding. Glatman persuaded Decca Records to sign them before Masterminding the fastest selling Classical record of all time.

He also signed the Regimental Band of the Coldstream Guards (after happening upon them whilst rehearsing for Trooping of the colour at Horseguards on his way to a meeting)which released their first album, Heroes with Universal's Decca Label. The album went on to achieve Platinum status.

In 2009, Glatman noticed (by accident) that it was coming up to the 70 Years anniversary of Vera Lynn's "We'll Meet Again". He persuaded Vera to come out of retirement to promote a re-package of her greatest hits back catalogue. Vera went on to become the oldest person to chart an album at Number 1.

In January 2010, he launched the highly publicised Punchbowl Recordings label with Guy Ritchie. The label is a subsidiary of Universal Music and will house the Punchbowl Band, a traditional Irish quartet which play frequently at Ritchie’s West End pub.

In February 2011, Glatman described Blue's decision to represent the UK at the 2011 Eurovision Song Contest as "reckless insanity". He said: "They will have to win. Anything less and their reputation would be in tatters. It is the equivalent of Lewis Hamilton entering a go-kart race - he will be the strong favourite but there is also the possibility he could lose. So why risk it?" Blue finished in 11th position.
