= Without You (Blue song) =

Single by Blue

from the album Roulette
- Released: 16 May 2013
- Length: 3:26
- Label: Island
- Songwriters: Wayne Hector; Mich Hansen; Jason Gill; Daniel Davidsen; Lee Ryan; Duncan James; Antony Costa; Simon Webbe
- Producers: Cutfather; Gill; Davidsen

Blue singles chronology
"Hurt Lovers" (2013)	"Without You" (2013)	"Break My Heart" (2013)

"Without You" is a song by English boy band Blue. It was written by band members Lee Ryan, Duncan James, Antony Costa, and Simon Webbe along with Wayne Hector, Mich "Cutfather" Hansen, Jason Gill, and Daniel Davidsen and recorded for their fourth studio album, Roulette (2013). Production was helmed by Hansen, Gill, and Davidsen. "Without You" was released as the album's third single on 16 May in Austria, Germany, and Switzerland, where it reached the top 50 of the German and the Swiss Singles Chart.

== Music video ==
A music video for "Without You" was directed by German filmmaker Lennart Brede. Filming took place in Los Angeles and was tracked by the eighth season of the German reality television series Germany's Next Topmodel during which contestants Anna-Maria Damm, Marie Czuczman, Maike van Grieken, and Sabrina Elsner were picked by Blue to appear alongside them in the video.

== Track listing ==
Digital download
No.	Title	Producer(s)	Length
1.	"Without You" (Album Version)	Cutfather; Jason Gill; Daniel Davidsen	3:26
2.	"Without You" (Jiggy Joint Hip-House Remix)	Cutfather; Gill; Davidsen; Jiggy Joint^{[a]}	3:43
3.	"Without You" (Jiggy Joint Remix)	Cutfather; Gill; Davidsen; Joint^{[a]}	4:26
4.	"Without You" (Numarek Radio Mix)	Cutfather; Gill; Davidsen; Marek Pompetzki^{[a]}; Paul Neumann^{[a]}	3:20

UK Double A-Sided single
No.	Title	Length
1.	"Break My Heart" (No Rap Version)	3:02
2.	"Without You" (Clean Radio Edit)	3:04

Notes

- ^a signifies an additional producer

== Credits and personnel ==
Adapted from the liner notes of Roulette.

- Sascha Bühren – mastering
- Cutfather – songwriting, production, percussion
- Anthony Costa – songwriting
- Daniel Davidsen – songwriting, production, drums, guitar, instruments, programming
- Jason Gill – songwriting, production, drums, instrumentation, programming
- Wayne Hector – songwriting
- Duncan James – songwriting
- Mads Nilsson – mixing
- Lee Ryan – songwriting
- Simon Webbe – songwriting

== Charts ==
Weekly chart performance for "Without You"
Chart (2013)	Peak position
Germany (GfK)	44
Switzerland (Schweizer Hitparade)	43

== Release history ==
Release dates and formats for "Without You"
Regions	Dates	Format(s)	Label(s)	Ref
Austria	16 May 2013	Digital download	Island Records	
Germany	16 May 2013	Digital download	Island Records	
Switzerland	16 May 2013	Digital download	Island Records	
