= Hurt Lovers =

Single by Blue

from the album Roulette
- Released: 4 January 2013
- Length: 3:54
- Label: Island
- Songwriters: Jez Ashurst; Martin "Fly" Fliegenschmidt; David Jost; Alexander Zuckowski
- Producers: Robin Grubert; Alexander Zuckowski

Blue singles chronology
"I Can" (2011)	"Hurt Lovers" (2013)	"Without You" (2013)

"Hurt Lovers" is a song by English boy band Blue. It was written by Alexander Zuckowski, Martin "Fly" Fliegenschmidt, Jez Ashurst, and David Jost and recorded for the group's fourth studio album, Roulette (2013), with production handled by Grubert and Zuckowski. Fliegenschmidt and Kiko Masbaum served as co-producers on the track. First released in German-speaking Europed on 4 January 2013, it marked Blue's first official single in two years, following their Eurovision 2011 entry "I Can."

The song became Blue's sixth top 10 hit in Germany, where it peaked at number seven and served as the official theme for the German romantic comedy film Break Up Man (2013). In the United Kingdom, "Hurt Lovers" charted at number 70 on the UK Singles Chart, becoming their lowest-charting single by then in the UK. In promotion of the single, Blue performed it live on The Voice of Romania in December 2012, as well as embarking on an acoustic radio tour across six cities in Germany. They also performed it on The Late Late Show in Ireland on 26 April 2013.

== Background ==
Blue began recording new material in July 2010, three months after they first got back together, after a five-year break from the music industry. In an interview, the band claimed that "Hurt Lovers" was one of the first tracks they recorded after reuniting, and that it was an obvious choice for the band's reunion single. The track was written by Alexander Zuckowski, Martin "Fly" Fliegenschmidt, Jez Ashurst, and David Jost.

Blue first premiered "Hurt Lovers" during a concert in China on 22 June 2012. It received positive reception across Asia, before being officially premiered in Germany on 6 October 2012. Thus, the creators of the film Break Up Man approached the band, and asked if the song could be used as the official theme for the film. Thus, the track received an early release in Germany on 4 January 2013, before being released across the world later in the year.

== Commercial performance ==
"Hurt Lovers" achieved its greatest commercial success in German-speaking Europe, particularly in Germany, where it became Blue's sixth top 10 hit and peaked at number 7 on the German Singles Chart upon its 4 January 2013 release. Elsewhere in Europe, the song reached number 22 in Switzerland and number 27 in Austria. In the United Kingdom, "Hurt Lovers" was released on 22 April 2013 and reached number 70 on the UK Singles Chart, making it the band's lowest-charting single in the UK at that point. However, it achieved a stronger performance on UK airplay rankings, peaking at number 17 on the UK Airplay Chart. The single also reached number 70 on the Scottish Singles Chart.

== Music video ==
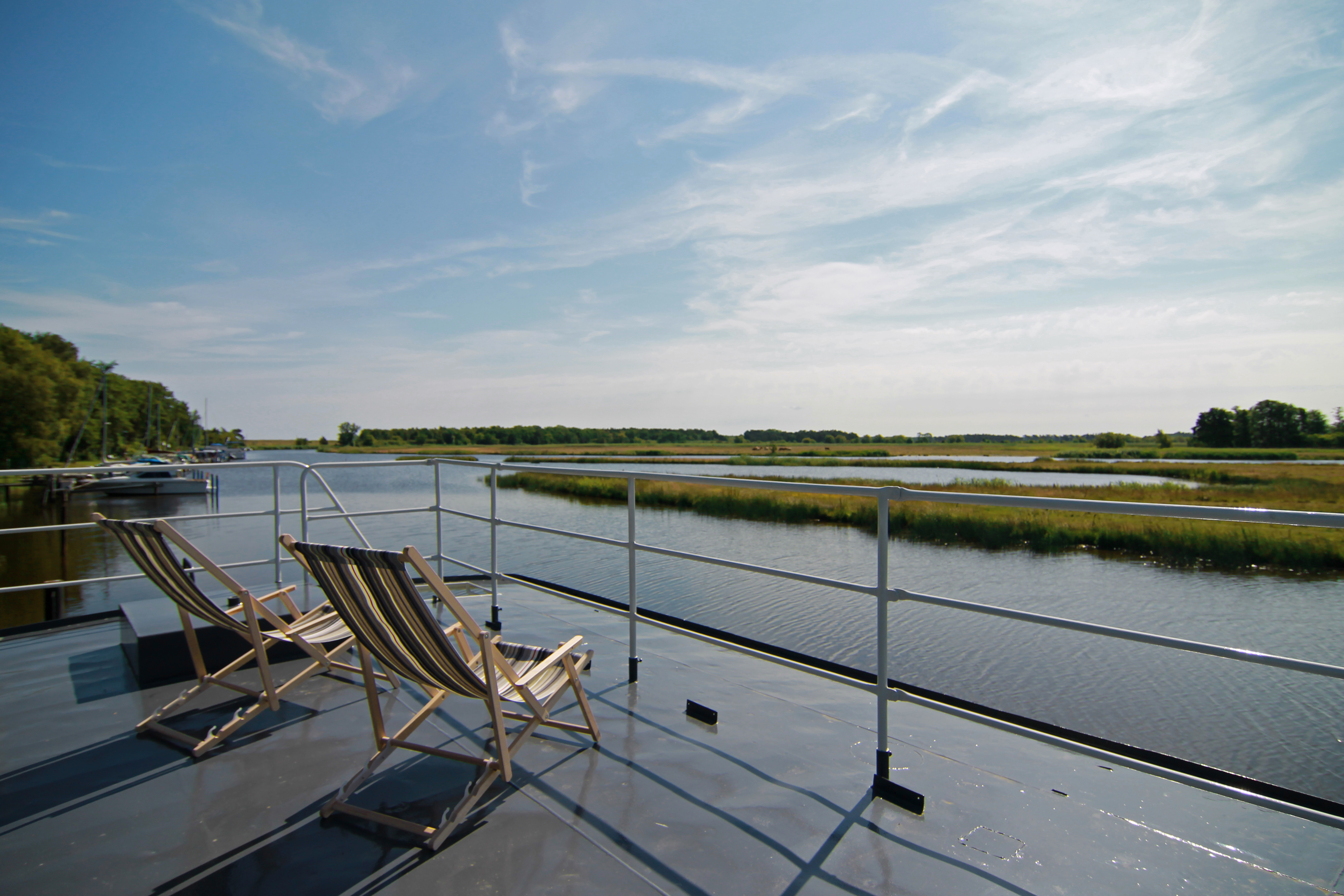
A music video for "Hurt Lovers" was filmed in Prerow on the Darß peninsula.

Two versions of the music video for "Hurt Lovers" were produced. The first version was directed by German filmmaker Katja Kuhl and filmed in late October 2012. Shot in black and white, the video was filmed in the municipality of Prerow on the Darß peninsula, located on the southern shore of the Baltic Sea. The video features Blue performing the song on the edge of a grassy cliff, with Lee Ryan and Duncan James wearing fur coats, while Antony Costa and Simon Webbe appear in shirts and ties. Actors Tim Forssman and Nell Pietrzyk also make appearances as extras. This version of the video was released on 15 March 2013, as the video to accompany the release of the single on the British market.

A second version of the video, called Schlussmacher version, was filmed in Berlin towards the end of November 2012 and released to Blue's official YouTube account on 13 December 2012, at a total length of three-minutes and fifty-six seconds. The video it set in the Quartier 206 shopping centre on Friedrichstraße in Berlin-Mitte, where Blue have a chance meeting with Matthias Schweighöfer and Milan Peschel, the stars of the film Schlussmacher (2012). The video also features a number of clips from the film, intertwined with the footage of Blue. This version of the video was filmed exclusively for the German market.

== Track listing ==
Digital download
No.	Title	Writer(s)	Producer(s)	Length
1.	"Hurt Lovers"	Ali Zuckowski; Martin "Fly" Fliegenschmidt; Jez Ashurst; David Jost	Robin Grubert; Zuckowski; Fliegenschmidt^{[a]}; Kiko Masbaum^{[a]}	3:54
2.	"Risk It All"	Lucas Secon; Wayne Hector	Secon	3:43
3.	"Hurt Lovers" (TroyBoi Remix)	Zuckowski; Fliegenschmidt; Ashurst; Jost	Robin Grubert; Zuckowski; Fliegenschmidt^{[a]}; Masbaum^{[a]}; TroyBoi^{[b]}	3:57
4.	"Hurt Lovers" (BootSlap's Club Mix)	Zuckowski; Fliegenschmidt; Ashurst; Jost	Robin Grubert; Zuckowski; Fliegenschmidt^{[a]}; Masbaum^{[a]}; BootSlap^{[b]}	6:05
5.	"Hurt Lovers" (Video)			3:54

German CD single
No.	Title	Writer(s)	Producer(s)	Length
1.	"Hurt Lovers"	Zuckowski; Fliegenschmidt; Ashurst; Jost	Robin Grubert; Zuckowski; Fliegenschmidt^{[a]}; Masbaum^{[a]}	3:54
2.	"Risk It All"	Secon; Hector	Secon	3:43

Notes

- ^a signifies a co-producer

== Credits and personnel ==
Credits adapted from the liner notes of Roulette.

- Jez Ashurst – songwriter
- Sascha Bühren – mastering
- Martin "Fly" Fliegenschmidt – songwriter, co-producer, guitar
- Robin Grubert – producer, keyboards, programmed by
- David Jost – songwriter
- Kiko Masbaum – co-producer, drums, keyboards, mixer
- Boris Matchin – strings
- Stefan Pintev – strings
- Rodrigo Reichel – strings
- Alexander Zuckowski – songwriter, producer, drum programming, guitar, piano

== Charts ==
Chart performance for "Hurt Lovers"
Chart (2012–13)	Peak position
Austria (Ö3 Austria Top 40)	27
Belgium (Ultratip Bubbling Under Flanders)	89
Germany (GfK)	7
Scottish Singles Sales (Official Charts)	70
Switzerland (Schweizer Hitparade)	22
UK Singles (Official Charts)	70
UK Airplay (Music Week)	17

== Release history ==
Release dates and formats for "Hurt Lovers"
Region	Date	Format(s)	Label	Ref
Germany	4 January 2013	CD; digital download	Island	
United Kingdom	21 April 2013	Digital download	Island	
