= Watch My Lips =

- Directed by: Robin Bextor; Simon Hanning
- Produced by: REB Productions
- Starring: Sophie Ellis-Bextor; Angie Pollock; Martin Waugh; Richard Jones; Paul Stewart
- Edited by: James Loughrey
- Music by: Sophie Ellis-Bextor
- Distributed by: Universal
- Release date: 24 February 2003
- Running time: 146 minutes
- Country: United Kingdom
- Language: English

Watch My Lips is the first and only video release by British singer and songwriter Sophie Ellis-Bextor. It includes Ellis-Bextor's concert at the Shepherd's Bush Empire, as part of the Read My Lips Tour; Read My Lips-era videos; Theaudience's videos and extras.

== Critical reception ==
A critic at Amazon.co.uk reviewed Watch My Lips positively, saying that "it successfully mines the seam of hits spawned by her Read My Lips album and of course, 'Groovejet', her mesmerising collaboration with DJ Spiller". He also commented: "Bextor's ironic interpretation of the role of the pop princess, a native musical intelligence and a host of influences from Blondie's guitar-driven rock circa 1979 to Moby are a potent combination which help to underline the breadth of her appeal."

== Track listing ==
=== Read My Lips Tour live at Shepherd's Bush Empire ===
1. "Sparkle" – 4:38
2. "Universe Is You" – 3:59
3. "Lover" – 4:16
4. "A Pessimist Is Never Disappointed" – 3:54
5. "By Chance" – 4:10
6. "Final Move" – 5:59
7. "Is It Any Wonder" – 4:31
8. "Groovejet (If This Ain't Love)" – 3:54
9. "Everything Falls Into Place" – 3:53
10. "Murder on the Dancefloor" – 5:12
11. "Move This Mountain" – 6:54
1. "Get Over You" (Encore) – 3:34
2. "Take Me Home" (Encore) – 4:29

=== Read My Lips-era videos ===
1. "Take Me Home" – 4:05
2. "Murder on the Dancefloor" – 3:55
3. "Get Over You" – 3:34
4. "Move This Mountain" – 5:45
5. "Music Gets the Best of Me" (day version) – 3:29

=== Theaudience promos ===
6. "I Got the Wherewithal" – 3:46
7. "If You Can't Do It When You're Young; When Can You Do It?" – 3:49
8. "A Pessimist Is Never Disappointed" – 3:44

=== Extras ===
- On tour diary
- Interview
- Credits
- "Music Gets the Best of Me" (night version) – 4:02

The Ukrainian version of Watch My Lips does not include the night version of the "Music Gets the Best of Me" music video.

== Charts ==
Chart performance for Watch My Lips
Chart (2003)	Peak position
UK Music Videos (OCC)	4
