= Take Me Home (Cher song) =

1979 single by Cher

- European vinyl single artwork

Single by Cher

from the album Take Me Home
- B-side: "Wasn't It Good"; "My Song (Too Far Gone)"
- Released: January 29, 1979
- Recorded: 1978
- Genre: Disco
- Length: 6:45 (album version); 3:30 (single version)
- Label: Casablanca
- Songwriters: Michele Aller; Bob Esty
- Producer: Bob Esty

Cher singles chronology
"Pirate" (1977)	"Take Me Home" (1979)	"Wasn't It Good" (1979)

"Take Me Home" is a song recorded by American singer and actress Cher for her fifteenth studio album. The album, released in 1979, bore the same name as the single. "Take Me Home" is a disco song conceived after Cher was recommended to venture into said genre after the commercial failure of her previous albums. The lyrics center around the request of a woman to be taken home by her lover. It was released as the lead single from the Take Me Home album in January 1979 through Casablanca Records, pressed as a 12-inch single.

Music critics gave positive reviews of "Take Me Home", highlighting its sound and melody. The single fared well in the United States charts, peaking at number eight on the Billboard Hot 100 and entering three of its component charts. In Oceania, it entered the singles chart of New Zealand at number 49. It was also a hit in Canada, reaching the top-ten of the singles chart.

== Background and composition ==
"Take Me Home"
30 second audio sample of "Take Me Home"

After releasing the studio albums Stars (1975), I'd Rather Believe in You (1976), Cherished and Two the Hard Way (1977), which became commercial failures, Cher went to the headquarters of Casablanca Records, in order to start recording for a new full-length record. She was hoping to record rock and roll-tinged music, though she was quickly advised by Neil Bogart to delve into disco music before recording with a genre that, according to him, she was not very good at. She was reluctant to take his advice, as she regarded disco as a "superficial" genre and did not believe it was "serious music". However, she took his advice, and started working with Bob Esty, who arranged and produced records for Donna Summer and Barbra Streisand. Esty was skeptical of Cher's decision to record disco music, although he changed his mind after he began recording with her. The first song he played her was a demo of "Take Me Home", which Cher said she liked.

"Take Me Home" is a disco song running at a length of six minutes and forty-five seconds (6:45). Its lyrics see Cher asking her partner to "take her home", which is an indirect way of expressing her desire to have sexual intercourse. For the book The Persistence of Sentiment: Display and Feeling in Popular Music of the 1970s, Mitchell Morris commented on the song: "Ostensibly a plea to be chosen, the song relies on the musical force of the arrangement combined with Cher's vocal presence to turn this plea into an irresistible demand, the auditory equivalent of the showgirl's direct gaze."

== Release and reception ==
"Take Me Home" was released in the United States as a 12-inch single at a 33 ⅓ rpm by Casablanca Records, containing the original version of "Take Me Home" and B-side "Wasn't It Good". Therefore, it served as the album's lead single. Promotional versions were also sent to radio stations in the United States with a different coloring on the vinyl, although with the same track listing. In Germany and France, the vinyl was pressed by Philips and branded as a "Super Single" and substituted "Wasn't It Good" with "My Song (Far Too Gone)". Some international pressings' vinyl sleeves had the same image as that of its parent album printed, featuring Cher dressed in a "gilded Viking warrior get-up", a winged bikini bottom, wings and a gold scabbard attached to her hip. UGO Networks' K. Thor Jensen considered the sleeve to be her "bad taste highwater mark", and named her outfit "Flash Gordon-esque". In the United Kingdom, when "Wasn't It Good" was issued as a vinyl single, "Take Me Home" served as its B-side.

The staff of Billboard magazine picked it as a recommended disco single and wrote: "[The song] is an upbeat, cleanly produced sound with a light, easy melody. It's sure to catch the ears of the disco set." The Cash Box critic noted that Cher had "discovered disco", highlighting that "a danceable beat (...) is bolstered by Cher's dynamic singing", with a "whirlwind string arrangement" adding emotion. A reviewer for AllMusic singled out the track from its parent album, feeling it was one of its "track picks". Having spent in total 20 weeks on the US Billboard Hot 100, "Take Me Home" peaked at number eight, thus making it Cher's first top 10 single since 1974's "Dark Lady". It also entered its component charts of Adult Contemporary, Hot Dance Club Play (now the Hot Dance Club Songs) and Hot Soul Singles (now Hot R&B/Hip-Hop Songs) charts, respectively, at numbers 19, two and 21. It was certified Gold in the United States by the Recording Industry Association of America (RIAA) on May 3, 1979. Billboard ran an article on Cher's biggest hits on the Hot 100, where "Take Me Home" was listed as the eleventh. The single was a hit in Canada, where it reached the top 10 on the charts. In New Zealand it reached number 49 and stayed for two weeks before leaving the chart.

== Live performances ==
Cher performed the song on her Take Me Home Tour wearing a shiny silver wig along with a matching silver sequin dress. She performed the song for the first time in twenty years on her concerts from her Do You Believe? Tour, which ran from 1999 to 2000, wearing an almost identical silver sequined outfit she wore during the Take Me Home tour. During her Living Proof: The Farewell Tour (2002–05), she performed it in a similar fashion, changing the wig and shirt-and-pants set's color to a sparkly red. At her residence in Las Vegas at Caesars Palace, in the show Cher at the Colosseum, Cher performed the song in a similar costume in turquoise color. Cher also performed the song in her Classic Cher shows with the turquoise costume from Caesars Palace.

== Charts ==
=== Weekly charts ===
Weekly chart performance for "Take Me Home" by Cher
Chart (1979)	Peak position
Canada Top Singles (RPM)	10
Canada Dance Singles (RPM)	11
Canada Adult Contemporary (RPM)	41
New Zealand (Recorded Music NZ)	49
Spain Radio (Los 40)	13
US Billboard Hot 100	8
US Adult Contemporary (Billboard)	19
US Dance Club Songs (Billboard)	2
US Hot R&B/Hip-Hop Songs (Billboard)	21
US Cash Box Top 100	10

=== Year-end charts ===
Year-end chart performance for "Take Me Home" by Cher
Chart (1979)	Position
Canada Top Singles	77
US Billboard Hot 100	56

== Certifications ==
Certifications and sales for "Take Me Home" by Cher
Region	Certification	Certified units/sales
United States (RIAA)	Gold	1,000,000^{^}
^{^} Shipments figures based on certification alone.

== Sophie Ellis-Bextor version ==
"Take Me Home"

Single by Sophie Ellis-Bextor

from the album Read My Lips
- B-side: "Sparkle"
- Released: August 13, 2001
- Genre: Dance-pop; nu-disco
- Length: 4:06
- Label: Polydor
- Songwriters: Esty; Aller; Sophie Ellis-Bextor
- Producer: Damian LeGassick

Sophie Ellis-Bextor singles chronology
"Groovejet (If This Ain't Love)" (2000)	"Take Me Home" (2001)	"Murder on the Dancefloor" (2001)

Music video
- "Take Me Home" on YouTube

"Take Me Home" (also known as "Take Me Home (A Girl Like Me)") was covered by English recording artist Sophie Ellis-Bextor for her debut studio album Read My Lips (2001). It contains rewritten lyrics by Ellis-Bextor, while British musician Damian LeGassick handled production and a few other tasks. Polydor Records released it as both a digital download and a CD single on August 13, 2001, alongside a remix and B-side track "Sparkle".

An accompanying music video, directed by Sophie Muller, was included in the CD single release and features Ellis-Bextor in a variety of outfits and high-couture clothes. In 2018, "Take Me Home" was released in a re-recorded orchestral version as the second single off Ellis-Bextor's greatest hits compilation The Song Diaries.

=== Background ===
Ellis-Bextor first ventured into the music business as the frontwoman for indie rock band theaudience. A moderately successful band, they released an album with Mercury Records and eLLeFFe, which spawned various singles, including "I Know Enough (I Don't Get Enough)", which reached number twenty-five on the UK Singles Chart. After finishing up the promotion for their debut album, they recorded a demo tape for a potential second album, however, Mercury dropped them and they split shortly afterwards. Following the disbandment of the group, Ellis-Bextor recorded vocals for DJ Spiller's single "Groovejet (If This Ain't Love)", which ultimately became a commercial success, peaking at number one on the UK Singles Chart in 2000.

=== Production and composition ===
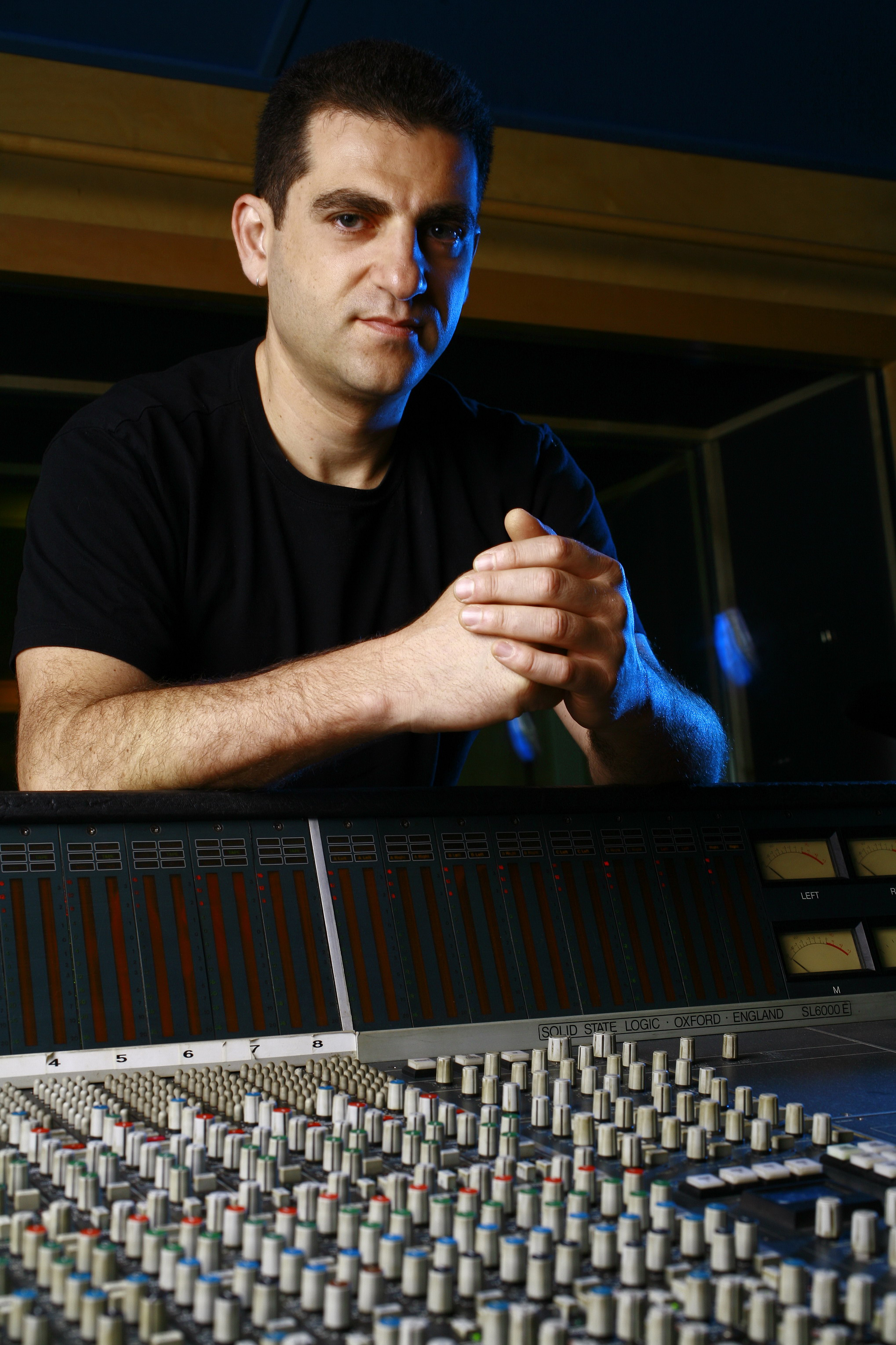
Yoad Nevo pictured programmed the bass guitar.

The track was produced by British musician Damian LeGassick, who also mixed and engineered the song. He additionally played the keyboards and the guitar while programming them. The bass guitar was played by Guy Pratt and programmed by Yoad Nevo. Jake Davis served as an engineer for mix; he also helmed the additional programming and sound design. The sound was remixed and additionally produced by Jeremy Wheatley at the Townhouse studios, while Ellis-Bextor's vocals were produced and recorded by Bacon & Quarmby at the Strongroom studios.

Being a cover of Cher's song, the song retains writing credits for Bob Esty and Michele Aller, while Ellis-Bextor included new lyrics written by herself. While both versions address sexual intercourse, the publication noted that in the original version, Cher "sings romantically about 'makin' love'" while Ellis-Bextor sings "more aggressive" lyrics such as "only fair I get my way". Even before Ellis-Bextor had released the cover, Cher's management deemed the rewritten lyrics overly sexual. To NME, Ellis-Bextor stated:

I was told by my publishers that Cher heard my version and she doesn't like my new lyrics. She thinks it's too overtly sexual. But the original writers were happy for me to do that—Cher didn't actually write it so she didn't get approval about what happened to the song. Now apparently she's heard what I've done and she doesn't like it.

Ellis-Bextor later admitted in her autobiography 'Spinning Plates' (page 197) that she had made this up, writing: “When it came to my first album, I think I felt the need to tell people I was a writer […] I had changed the lyrics and to make sure people knew I’d co-written the new lyrics (and I’m so sorry about this), I lied and made up a story that Cher didn’t like my new lyrics because they were too sexy. I am still a bit shocked that I was believed at all!”

=== Release and reception ===
"Take Me Home" was released by Polydor Records in the United Kingdom on August 13, 2001, and in the United States as an import. It was released as a legal digital download and an enhanced maxi CD single; both featured the Ellis-Bextor cover, B-side "Sparkle" and a Jewels & Stone remix, while the latter contained the song's music video for the song. The single was also pressed as an edition dubbed the "Mixes & Remixes" EP, released only in France. A 12-inch single was also pressed in the United Kingdom, with remixes. Two AllMusic writers reviewed the song. Upon its release as a single, Dean Carlson gave it a negative rating of one and a half star out of five, commenting: "[...] Ellis Bextor is well aware of what's required for beating the likes of Victoria Beckham and Emma Bunton at their own game—simply take Cher's 'Take Me Home' and add one disco beat circa ABBA's 'Fernando', being mindful to avoid its cocaine harmonies and the air of free love [...], techno-fy it with random fiddly bits, sing with the breathless detachment of someone getting a massage from a lumberjack, and chuck in some remixes just so everybody knows that you're not utterly out of step." After its parent album's release, Kelvin Hayes denoted it as one of the album's strongest tracks, as did Toby Manning from Q. For Yahoo! Music, Gary Crossing wrote that the album "start[ed] well with the song", while describing it as Spiller-esque. Betty Clarke of The Guardian regarded "Take Me Home" as a "pleasant enough song", though she called the production and Ellis-Bextor's vocals "more tired than sexy".

On the UK Singles Chart, the song was a commercial success, debuting and peaking at number 2. While extensively analyzing the song, Justin Myers from the Official Charts Company observed that although the song had reached the runner-up position on the UK Singles Chart, it was largely overshadowed by "Murder on the Dancefloor". In Netherlands and Germany, the song peaked at number 79, respectively on the Dutch Top 40 and Media Control Charts—staying on each chart for respectively 12 and 5 weeks. The song also reached top 20 on the Recorded Music NZ singles chart of New Zealand, where it stayed for 14 weeks before leaving the chart.

=== Promotion ===
To promote the song, Sophie Muller filmed a music video for "Take Me Home" which was released on the song's CD single. The video was also included in her video album Watch My Lips (2002).' It opens with Ellis-Bextor, dressed in a black one-strap dress, in front of a yellow-toned painting of a woman with red lips. Throughout the music video, Ellis-Bextor is seen in a variety of dresses and outfits—she appears standing in front of a green mural with a flowery large tablecloth, while dressing a see-through shirt, which reveals her black bra; other scene shows her with a dark green gown; other shows her with a flower and leaves pattern and holding a in front of a projected image which shows the Eiffel Tower from far. She also appears dressed in a green trench coat in another scene. Usually, costume and location scenes are accompanied by a change of gradient color, which are projected onto Ellis-Bextor. By the middle of the video, she walks across a street, surrounded by formally-dressed men, who dance around her and lift her. After the song's middle 8 plays, the lights of the street turn on and various French event posters are shown. The video concludes as they all enter a disco club. She also performed the track at the Read My Lips Tour (2002–03), serving as its encore. Ellis-Bextor would shortly introduce the song, with green eye makeup and red lipstick, dressed in a cream-colored dress and pink heels. As the backing track started playing, she would start singing and clapping her hands as the public imitated her, and the audience was showered with confetti.

=== Charts ===
==== Weekly charts ====
Weekly chart performance for "Take Me Home" by Sophie Ellis-Bextor
Chart (2001–2002)	Peak position
Australia (ARIA)	106
Europe (Eurochart Hot 100)	13
Germany (GfK)	79
Ireland (IRMA)	6
Italy (FIMI)	43
Netherlands (Single Top 100)	79
New Zealand (Recorded Music NZ)	18
Scottish Singles Sales (Official Charts)	1
UK Singles (Official Charts)	2
UK Airplay (Music Week)	1
UK Dance (Official Charts)	18

==== Year-end charts ====
Year-end chart performance for "Take Me Home" by Sophie Ellis-Bextor
Chart (2001)	Position
Ireland (IRMA)	64
UK Singles (OCC)	46
UK Airplay (Music Week)	47

=== Certifications ===
Certifications and sales for "Take Me Home" by Sophie Ellis-Bextor
Region	Certification	Certified units/sales
United Kingdom (BPI)	Silver	264,000

=== Release history ===
Release dates and formats for "Take Me Home"
Region	Date	Format(s)	Label(s)	Ref(s).
United Kingdom	August 13, 2001	12-inch vinyl; CD; cassette	Polydor	
Australia	August 13, 2001	CD	Polydor	
