= Mixed Up World =

2003 single by Sophie Ellis-Bextor

Single by Sophie Ellis-Bextor

from the album Shoot from the Hip
- B-side: "The Earth Shook the Devil's Hand"
- Released: 13 October 2003
- Genre: Disco
- Length: 3:44
- Label: Polydor
- Songwriters: Sophie Ellis-Bextor; Gregg Alexander; Matt Rowe
- Producers: Gregg Alexander; Matt Rowe

Sophie Ellis-Bextor singles chronology
"Music Gets the Best of Me" (2002)	"Mixed Up World" (2003)	"I Won't Change You" (2003)

Music video
- "Mixed Up World" on YouTube

"Mixed Up World" is a song by British singer-songwriter Sophie Ellis-Bextor, released on 13 October 2003 as the lead single from her second studio album, Shoot from the Hip (2003). Written by Bextor, Gregg Alexander and Matt Rowe, it was produced by both Alexander and Rowe. Lyrically, the song is about Ellis-Bextor trying to navigate life in a world that is mixed up, with Bextor saying that the song was partially influenced by the Iraq war, which she claimed left her "feeling powerless", with the song trying to "find joy in a world that suddenly seemed heavy and cynical".

"Mixed Up World" reached number seven on the UK Singles Chart and was especially successful in Denmark, where it debuted and peaked at number three. It has sold more than 35,000 copies in the UK, and in 2024, the Official Charts Company ranked it as Ellis-Bextor's 10th-best–selling song. The music video for the song features various dancers wearing a mix of bright and dark colours.

== Music video ==
The music video, directed by Rupert Jones, features men in bowler hats as Ellis-Bextor moves between giant black and white punctuation marks. It was the first video that shows her hair dyed blond. A short clip from the video was featured in an ad on Australia's VH1 channel in June 2006.

In a review of the song, Can't Stop the Pop claimed that the music video for "Mixed Up World" did not entirely reflect the lyrical nature of the song, claiming that whilst the song portrays "a sense of uncertainty", the music video does not visually portray this as a result of it having a "clear yet unrelated concept" which they claimed was "perfectly aligned to Sophie Ellis-Bextor’s slightly offbeat, avant-garde image".

== Track listings ==
UK CD single

1. "Mixed Up World" – 3:49
2. "Mixed Up World" (Groove Collision vocal mix) – 6:38
3. "The Earth Shook the Devil's Hand" – 2:42
4. "Mixed Up World" (CD-ROM) – 3:49

UK cassette single

1. "Mixed Up World" – 3:49
2. "Mixed Up World" (Groove Collision vocal mix) – 6:38
3. "The Earth Shook the Devil's Hand" – 2:42

European CD single

1. "Mixed Up World" – 3:49
2. "Mixed Up World" (Groove Collision vocal mix) – 6:38

European 12-inch single

A1. "Mixed Up World" (Groove Collision vocal mix)
B1. "Mixed Up World" (Groove Collision instrumental mix)
B2. "Mixed Up World" (radio edit)

Australian CD single

1. "Mixed Up World" – 3:49
2. "Take Me Home" (Sneaker Pimps remix) – 4:41
3. "Murder on the Dancefloor" (Phunk Investigation vocal mix) – 8:34
4. "Get Over You" (Almighty Pop'd Up mix) – 7:14
5. "Music Gets the Best of Me" (Flip & Fill remix) – 6:05

== Charts ==
Chart (2003)	Peak position
Australia (ARIA)	32
Austria (Ö3 Austria Top 40)	44
Belgium (Ultratip Bubbling Under Flanders)	8
Belgium (Ultratip Bubbling Under Wallonia)	9
Denmark (Tracklisten)	3
Germany (GfK)	69
Hungary (Editors' Choice Top 40)	24
Ireland (IRMA)	26
Netherlands (Single Top 100)	76
Romania (Romanian Top 100)	56
Scottish Singles Sales (Official Charts)	11
Switzerland (Schweizer Hitparade)	45
UK Singles (Official Charts)	7

== Sales ==
Region	Certification	Certified units/sales
United Kingdom	—	35,000

== Release history ==
Region	Date	Format(s)	Label(s)	Ref.
United Kingdom	13 October 2003	CD; cassette	Polydor	
Australia	20 October 2003	CD	Polydor	
