= I Got the Wherewithal =

Single by Theaudience

from the album Theaudience
- B-side: "Je Suis Content; Outside; Out of Space; Helen and Polly"
- Released: 27 October 1997
- Recorded: 1997
- Genre: Rock
- Length: 3:51
- Label: eLLeFFe, Mercury
- Songwriter(s): Billy Reeves
- Producer(s): Billy Reeves, Sophie Ellis-Bextor

Theaudience singles chronology
"I Got the Wherewithal" (1997)	"If You Can't Do It When You're Young; When Can You Do It?" (1997)

"I Got the Wherewithal" is the debut single by British group theaudience, released on 27 October 1997. The song peaked at No. 170 on the UK Singles Chart. The single was also issued in the United States as an EP in 1998. The B-sides for the single include "Outside; Out of Space", which is an acoustic re-working of "Running Out of Space" from the group's debut album Theaudience, "Helen & Polly", an instrumental reworking of "I Got the Wherewithal" focusing mostly on the string arrangement, and "Je Suis Content", a cover of a Jacques Dutronc song.

== Track listings ==
UK CD single (AUDCD1)

1. "I Got the Wherewithal" – 3:51
2. "Je Suis Content" – 2:38
3. "Outside; Out of Space" – 3:58
4. "Helen and Polly" – 3:46

UK Limited Edition vinyl (AUDVN1)

1. "I Got the Wherewithal" – 3:51
2. "Je Suis Content" – 2:38

American E.P. (314 538 164-2)

1. "I Got the Wherewithal" – 3:51
2. "Penis Size and Cars" – 2:57
3. "Ne Jamais Decu" – 3:36
4. "Ten Minutes Which Improved My Life" – 9:25
5. "There Are Worse Things I Could Do" – 2:19
6. "The Beginning, the Middle & the End" – 8:20
