= Today the Sun's on Us =

Single by Sophie Ellis-Bextor

from the album Trip the Light Fantastic
- B-side: "Duel"
- Released: 6 August 2007
- Genre: Pop
- Length: 4:18
- Label: Fascination
- Songwriters: Sophie Ellis-Bextor; Steve Robson; Nina Woodford
- Producers: Jeremy Wheatley; Brio Taliaferro

Sophie Ellis-Bextor singles chronology
| "Me and My Imagination" (2007) | "Today the Sun's on Us" (2007) | "Heartbreak (Make Me a Dancer)" (2009) |

Music video
- "Sophie Ellis-Bextor - Today The Sun's On Us" on YouTube

"Today the Sun's on Us" is a song by English musician Sophie Ellis-Bextor, released as the third single from her third studio album Trip the Light Fantastic (2007). It was written by Ellis-Bextor, Steve Robson, and Nina Woodford and produced by Jeremy Wheatley and Brio Taliaferro. A pop ballad featuring electric and bass guitar, its lyrics describe "appreciating the good times while they're here." It was released on 6 August 2007 as a CD single.

Critical response to "Today the Sun's on Us" was generally positive, with most appreciating the lyrics and overall tone of the song. The song was considered a commercial failure due to failing to replicate the success experienced by the preceding singles, peaking at number 64 on the UK Singles Chart. It fared better in Scotland, peaking at number 20 on the Scottish Singles Charts. An accompanying music video was filmed in Iceland, and depicts Ellis-Bextor as a thief in an emotionally abusive relationship.

== Recording and composition ==
"Today the Sun's on Us" was produced by Jeremy Wheatley and Brio Taliaferro. Steve Robson engineered Ellis-Bextor's vocals. Wheatley and Richard Edgeler mixed the song at the Twenty-One Studios in London. The song is a slow adult pop ballad which features electric guitars and a bass guitar. Ellis-Bextor's husband Richard Jones recorded both instruments, and Tim Van der Kuit recorded the electric guitar. The track was co-written by Ellis-Bextor, Robson and the Swedish songwriter Nina Woodford. Describing the song, Ellis-Bextor explained that it is about "appreciating the good times." She described it as "very sensitive", if "a bit melancholy." Reflecting on its release in 2010, Ellis-Bextor said:

It still gets me a little bit. I think that's cos it's really sincere. [...] when you've got a family, you spend a lot of time worrying about the what-ifs, and all the terrible things that can happen. You have to remember to not lose the moment because you're worried about what could be. But it's easier said than done.

Ellis-Bextor stated that she released the song as a single because "it was important to me with this single to push boundaries a little bit and part of that is explore a few musical directions that are a bit more unexpected, so it's been nice to release a ballad."

== Release ==
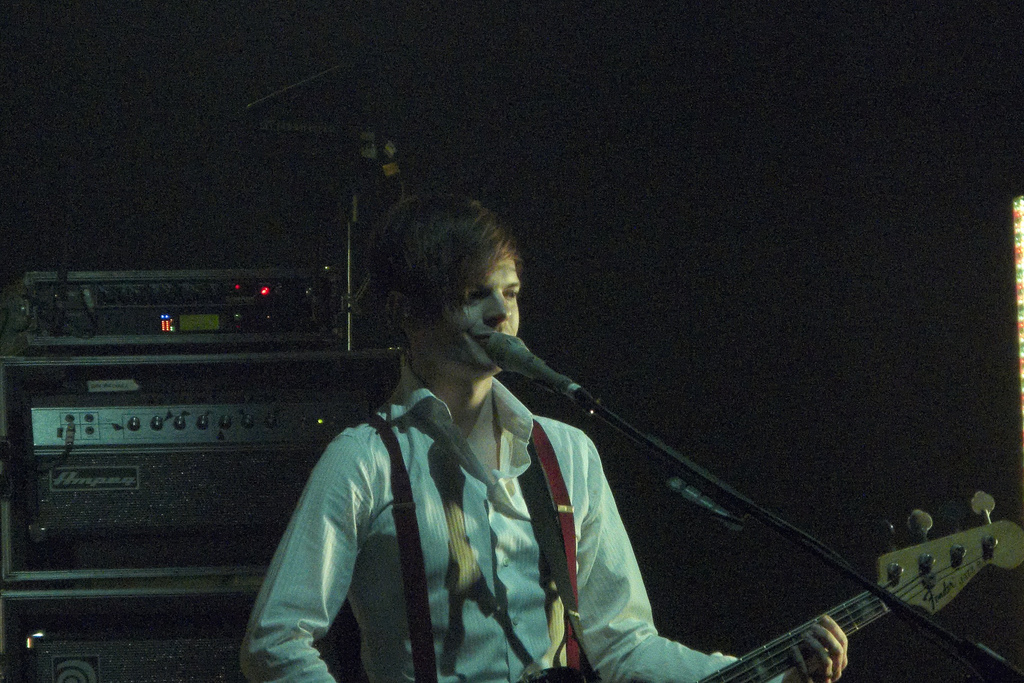
Richard Jones provided instrumentation for "Today the Sun's on Us".

"Today the Sun's on Us" was released as a CD single by Fascination as the third single from Trip the Light Fantastic. Issued on 6 August 2007, the single included the radio edit of the song and Ellis-Bextor's cover of "Duel" by Propaganda.

=== Critical reception ===
AllMusic's K. Ross Hoffman described the song as a "highlight" from its parent album Trip the Light Fantastic (2007). Nick Levine of Digital Spy remarked that, in "Today the Sun's on Us", Ellis-Bextor took on the role a "guitar pop balladeer" with "limited" vocals. Writing for Playlouder, Jeremy Allen positively compared the song to the works of Theaudience, Ellis-Bextor's former band. Writing for musicOMH, Ben Hogwood described it as "pleasant enough" and a "grower", despite its lack of "a big chorus". The staff of Popjustice listed it as the eighth best single of 2007, calling it "brilliant." This Is Fake DIY writer Stuart McCaighy characterised the song as "warm, layered and soothing with a summery sheen". Emily Mackay from Yahoo! Music compared "Today the Sun's on Us" to "The Cardigans on a bad day" and to the "naffer moments of Pink or Kelly Clarkson."

=== Chart performance ===
The song entered the UK Singles Chart at number 64, on the chart issue dated 25 August 2007. In January 2014, the song was ranked as Ellis-Bextor's 18th best-selling single in the United Kingdom, before slipping to 19th in 2024.

| Chart (2007) | Peak position |
|---|---|
| CIS Airplay (TopHit) | 137 |
| Romania (Romanian Top 100) | 54 |
| Scotland Singles (OCC) | 20 |
| UK Singles (OCC) | 64 |

== Music video ==
The music video for "Today the Sun's on Us" was filmed in Iceland by Sophie Muller. The video begins with Ellis-Bextor standing at the edge of a cliff, where she is startled by her male partner. Later, staying in a hotel room, Ellis-Bextor and her partner review surveillance footage of another couple and await their arrival at the same hotel. The following day, they tail the couple through the Hallgrímskirkja church. At night, in the hotel restaurant, Ellis-Bextor steals the key to the couple's hotel room, enters it, and steals money and jewels from its safe. She returns to the restaurant wearing the stolen jewels, angering her partner. They then pack and leave the hotel in a car, where they continue arguing. She throws a piece of jewelry out of the car window, prompting her partner to stop the car. She decides to flee from her partner on foot, but he pursues her and they have a physical altercation. The video ends on an ambiguous note, as he attempts to embrace her but she rebuffs him.

== Formats and track listings ==
- CD single
1. "Today The Sun's on Us" (Radio Edit) – 3:45
2. "Duel" – 4:24
- Club Promo
1. "Today The Sun's on Us" (Richmann Remix) – 6:41
2. "Today The Sun's on Us" (Richmann Radio Edit) – 4:10
- Digital single (2024)
1. "Today The Sun's on Us" – 4:18
2. "Duel" – 4:24
3. "Today The Sun's on Us" (Radio Edit) – 3:45
4. "Today The Sun's on Us" (Richmann Radio Edit) – 4:10
5. "Today The Sun's on Us" (Richmann Remix) – 6:41
