= Me and My Imagination =

Single by Sophie Ellis-Bextor

from the album Trip the Light Fantastic
- B-side: "Move to the Music"; "Here's to You"
- Released: 14 May 2007
- Recorded: 2006, Stanley House (London, England)
- Genre: Dance-pop, nu-disco
- Length: 3:27
- Label: Fascination
- Songwriters: Sophie Ellis-Bextor, Hannah Robinson, Matt Prime
- Producer: Matt Prime

Sophie Ellis-Bextor singles chronology
"Catch You" (2007)	"Me and My Imagination" (2007)	"Today the Sun's on Us" (2007)

Audio sample
- file; help

Music video
- "Sophie Ellis-Bextor - Me And My Imagination" on YouTube

"Me and My Imagination" is a song by British recording artist Sophie Ellis-Bextor for her third studio album, Trip the Light Fantastic (2007). It was written by Ellis-Bextor, Hannah Robinson and co-written and produced by Matt Prime. It is a dance-pop, disco song and its lyrics advise an overeager suitor to play harder to get. Some critics noted that it recalls the songs from her first studio album, Read My Lips (2001).

The song was released as the album's second single in May 2007, reaching number twenty-three on the UK Singles Chart. It received acclaim from music critics, who named it a brilliant and irresistible slice of pop. The lyrics were also praised, with many of whom commending the singer for the smart lyrical concept. The song was prominently used in several episodes of the Spanish television series Supermodelo, the Spanish version of America's Next Top Model.

== Background and composition ==
"Me and My Imagination" was written by Sophie Ellis-Bextor, Hannah Robinson and co-written and produced by Matt Prime. It is an electronic, dance and disco song. The lyrics advise an overeager suitor to play harder to get. "I don't need to know your every trick, so keep me guessing just a little bit", coos Sophie.

== Reception ==
=== Critical reception ===
The song received general acclaim from music critics. K. Ross Hoffman of AllMusic called it "an immaculate disco glide," while Nick Levine of Digital Spy named it "a sun-dappled disco." Stuart McCaighy of DIY magazine wrote a very positive review, stating "It's an immediate and irresistible slice of pop. The song's pace and melody make the most of Sophie's deadpan delivery. This is modern pop with old time appeal - it sticks in the head and refuses to budge." Emily MacKay of Yahoo! Music commented: "It's an old-school Sophie handbag house with a soft icy melody and a simple, smart lyrical concept." Caroline Sullivan of The Guardian commented: "She excels herself on the delicious single Me and My Imagination, her disengaged presence helping (along with a walloping melody and frantic violins) to push the song to ecstatic heights." However, Kitt Empire of The Observer wrote that the song "tries to recreate the Ibizan bliss of her debut album Read My Lips, but ends up more fake tan than sunkissed glow." Talia Kraine of BBC Music perceived that the song "recalled days of Read My Lips."

Andrew Bain of musicOMH wrote a favorable review, commenting "On first listen, most of the song is pretty forgettable, but with some persistence it manages, as all good pop songs do, to burrow neatly into the listener's brain and lodge itself there. However, unlike most other pop songs it achieves this goal with a more understated sound, achieving memorability through a chorus so gentle that you barely realise it's there. In other words, Sophie achieves a good pop single with the class that she is known for, never stooping to the unbearably repetitive nature of most pop. It makes for a much more pleasurable listen, even for those whose tastes usually lie outside the genre. As a whole it is a perfectly listenable and amiable song. If you liked Sophie's previous stuff, especially the last single (and not so much Murder on the Dancefloor), then this single is for you." Pitchfork ranked "Me and My Imagination" at number 87 on its list of the 100 Greatest Tracks of 2007. David Raposa wrote:

"Some things Sophie Ellis-Bextor can't do without: the three-minute song, disco strings, pop glitter, and men that play hard-to-get. This standout track from her third solo album is more of the same from a UK pop factory that produces pop hooks most Americans adore only when in the mouths of teenage babes or Gwen Stefani. Radio programmers, please note: Pure sugar like this will go a long way toward making the usual Top 40 placebos easier to swallow."

=== Charts and controversy ===
The single peaked at number 23 on the UK Singles Chart and it sold 10,000 copies in the United Kingdom. "Me and My Imagination" later appeared on the Abercrombie & Fitch playlist in America. On the Russian Top Hit 100, the song debuted at number 96 on the issue dated 21 May 2007. On the issue dated 28 May 2007, the song climbed from 96 to 53. On the issue dated 4 June 2007, the song moved to number 35. The song peaked at number 16 on the chart issue dated 16 July 2007.

The single's digital release caused controversy when iTunes failed to add the song until a week after it was supposed to be released, appearing on 14 May 2007 instead of 7 May 2007. Ellis-Bextor believed she would have scored a top 10 hit if the problem had not occurred. She described the error as "a nightmare", and believed it placed her chart position in jeopardy. Despite the charts controversy, the Official Charts Company ranked "Me and My Imagination" 12th in the best–selling songs by Ellis–Bextor in the United Kingdom.

== Music video ==
Ellis-Bextor in the music video, where she is dancing in the studio in front of a troupe of dancers, each wearing illuminated costumes of different colours.

The music video was directed by Nima Nourizadeh and filmed in west London. Sophie Muller was Ellis-Bextor's first choice to direct the video, but Muller had to decline the offer when she broke her ankle. The video features Ellis-Bextor in various places, singing to the camera. There are four sequences; the first takes place on an empty street, which then turns into a black studio. The second features Ellis-Bextor dancing in the studio in front of a troupe of dancers, each wearing illuminated costumes of different colours. The third sequence takes place in a park, while the fourth has Ellis-Bextor finding cover from the rain in London.

== Track listing ==
- 2-track single
1. "Me and My Imagination" – 3:27
2. "Move to the Music" – 3:33
- Maxi single
1. "Me and My Imagination" – 3:27
2. "Move to the Music" – 3:33
3. "Me and My Imagination" (Tony Lamezma Radio Mix) – 3:43
4. "Me and My Imagination" (StoneBridge Radio Mix) – 3:14
5. "Me and My Imagination" (video)
- 12" picture disc
1. "Me and My Imagination" – 3:28
2. "Here's to You" – 2:46
3. "Catch You" (Riff & Ray's Mix) – 8:17
4. "Me and My Imagination" (StoneBridge Vocal Mix) – 7:20
- Digital single (2024)
1. "Me and My Imagination" – 3:27
2. "Move to the Music" – 3:32
3. "Here's to You" – 2:47
4. "Me and My Imagination" (StoneBridge Radio Mix) – 3:14
5. "Me and My Imagination" (StoneBridge Remix) – 6:40
6. "Me and My Imagination" (Tony Lamezma Radio Mix) – 3:44
7. "Me and My Imagination" (Tony Lamezma Club Mix) – 5:19

== Chart performance ==
=== Weekly charts ===
Weekly chart performance for "Me and My Imagination"
Chart (2007)	Peak position
Belgium (Ultratip Bubbling Under Flanders)	9
CIS Airplay (TopHit)	16
Russia Airplay (TopHit)	32
Scottish Singles Sales (Official Charts)	16
UK Singles (Official Charts)	23

=== Year-end charts ===
Year-end chart performance for "Me and My Imagination"
Chart (2007)	Position
CIS (TopHit)	109
Russia Airplay (TopHit)	177

== Credits and personnel ==
- Additional production by Justin Spier and Mat Jackson
- All instruments by Matt Prime
- Additional bass: Guy Pratt
- Recorded at Stanley House in 2006

Credits adapted from the liner notes of Trip the Light Fantastic, Interscope Records.
