= Shoot from the Hip (album) =

Album by Sophie Ellis-Bextor

- Standard edition cover; certain international editions feature the text in blue

Studio album by Sophie Ellis-Bextor
- Released: 27 October 2003
- Recorded: 2003
- Genre: Dance-pop
- Length: 50:08
- Label: Polydor
- Producers: Gregg Alexander; Damian LeGassick; Matt Rowe; Jeremy Wheatley

Sophie Ellis-Bextor chronology
Read My Lips (2001)	Shoot from the Hip (2003)	Trip the Light Fantastic (2007)

Singles from Shoot from the Hip
- 1. "Mixed Up World" Released: 13 October 2003; 2. "I Won't Change You" Released: 22 December 2003

Shoot from the Hip is the second album by the English singer-songwriter Sophie Ellis-Bextor, released on 27 October 2003 by Polydor Records. It was produced by Gregg Alexander, Matt Rowe, Jeremy Wheatley and Damian LeGassick. The album reached number 19 on the UK Albums Chart, failing to replicate the sales of her debut album Read My Lips, which sold over a million copies worldwide.

== Background ==
The album was released in Europe in October 2003, but little interest was generated outside the United Kingdom, where the album peaked at number 19 on the UK Albums Chart, with the exception of Switzerland, where it peaked at number 35 on the Swiss Albums Chart. As with the single "Music Gets the Best of Me" the previous year, the album suffered from being caught in a glut of new releases in the approach to Christmas. Consequently, the album was cited as the singer's least commercially successful album until the release of her fourth studio album, Make a Scene, which reached number 33. The album only produced two singles—"Mixed Up World" and "I Won't Change You"—which reached number 7 and number 9 on the UK Singles Chart, respectively.

Apart from "Murder on the Dancefloor", none of Ellis-Bextor's solo material was released in the US until June 2007, when Shoot from the Hip was added to the American iTunes Store. The songs "I Won't Dance with You" and "The Walls Keep Saying Your Name" feature backing vocals (and one verse of lead vocal on the latter song) from Ellis-Bextor's ex-boyfriend and ex-manager, Andy Boyd, although his name does not appear anywhere in the album credits.

Similarly to "Sparkle" and "Final Move" missing from the worldwide version of Read My Lips, the international edition of Shoot from the Hip does not include the opening track "Making Music", "I Won't Dance with You" nor the hidden track following the end of "Hello, Hello", a cover of Olivia Newton-John's "Physical". The international edition also changes all text on the cover, disc and in the booklet to the shade of turquoise instead of the white used on the UK release.

In 2014, Ellis-Bextor reflected on the album to Attitude magazine, saying: "The second album still had the same feel as the first, but it was maybe a little bit darker. During that record I was going through a bit of a break-up so there are a few break-up songs on there. I wasn't feeling quite as funny and breezy as I was on the first album, but I got it back on album three."

== Critical reception ==
Professional ratings
Review scores
Source	Rating
AllMusic	3/5 stars
The Guardian	3/5 stars
The Independent	1/5 stars
Entertainment.ie	3/5 stars
Evening Standard	1/3 stars
MTV Asia	6/10 stars
Playlouder	3.5/5 stars
RTÉ	3/5 stars
Yahoo! Music UK	6/10

Writing for musicOMH, Sarah McDonnell highlighted the input from Bernard Butler, feeling that different co-writers make the album "patchy in places" and as a result, Ellis-Bextor's songs "sometimes sound a little self-conscious and clunky, almost a little too earnestly conveying her message". Nevertheless, McDonnell also stated "whatever you might think of Sophie Ellis-Bextor, you can't fault her determination" and felt that the album is a "good effort and displays an ambition – and potential – to produce consistent, high quality, intelligent pop music".

K. Ross Hoffman of AllMusic said that while the album "lacks anything nearly as distinctive as her early singles, [...] it's still a solid, perfectly respectable collection of contemporary dance-pop", pointing to "the smooth disco single 'Mixed-Up World' and the chipper 'I Won't Change You'", the latter of which he compared to "Love at First Sight" by Kylie Minogue. Hoffman further judged "there's enough variety to keep the album from sagging, particularly as things turn slightly darker and moodier towards the latter half with the spiky 'You Get Yours' and the odd, haunted 'The Walls Keep Saying Your Name'." However, he felt differently about Butler's contribution, pointing out "the understated ballad 'I Am Not Good at Not Getting What I Want' [...] rounds things out nicely."

While McDonnell compared lead single "Mixed Up World" to material by the Pet Shop Boys, Lucy Davies of BBC Music felt that track is similar to "the best 80s PWL creations". Although singling out the final two tracks (positively comparing the strings in "Hello, Hello" to Andrew Lloyd Webber and questioning why "Physical" is a hidden track when it "encapsulates Sophie; knowingly dead-pan with a little wink tipped at the listener"), Davies used a line from opening song "Making Music" to say the album is largely "making music by numbers"—calling the two songs Boyd contributes vocals on "naff" and the rhyming on "Party in My Head" "cringe worthy". Davies commented that despite the songs on Shoot from the Hip featuring "chewing gum melodies", "Sophie needs to think long and hard about where she's going next."

entertainment.ie held a similar opinion, summarising that even though Shoot from the Hip is a "perfectly efficient pop album", "it still leaves you wondering what Ellis-Bextor could achieve if she really tried."

== Track listing ==
No.	Title	Writer(s)	Producer(s)	Length
1.	"Making Music" (UK-exclusive track)	Sophie Ellis-Bextor; Rob Davis	Damian LeGassick	3:36
2.	"Mixed Up World"	Ellis-Bextor; Gregg Alexander; Matt Rowe	Alexander; Rowe	3:45
3.	"I Won't Change You"	Ellis-Bextor; Alexander; Rowe	Alexander; LeGassick; Rowe; Jeremy Wheatley	3:40
4.	"Nowhere Without You"	Ellis-Bextor; Davis	LaGassick	4:53
5.	"Another Day"	Ellis-Bextor	LeGassick	3:20
6.	"Party in My Head"	Ellis-Bextor; Alexander; Rowe	LeGassick	3:34
7.	"Love It Is Love"	Ellis-Bextor; Alex James; Rowe; Rik Simpson	LeGassick	3:29
8.	"You Get Yours"	Ellis-Bextor; Andy Boyd; Ross Newell	LeGassick	3:59
9.	"The Walls Keep Saying Your Name"	Ellis-Bextor	LeGassick	4:23
10.	"I Won't Dance with You" (UK-exclusive track)	Ellis-Bextor; LeGassick	LeGassick	3:59
11.	"I Am Not Good at Not Getting What I Want"	Ellis-Bextor; Bernard Butler	LeGassick	3:33
12.	"Hello, Hello"	Ellis-Bextor; LeGassick	LeGassick	4:20
13.	"Physical" (UK-exclusive hidden track)	Steve Kipner; Terry Shaddick	LeGassick	3:53

North American digital edition
No.	Title	Writer(s)	Producer(s)	Length
14.	"The Earth Shook the Devil's Hand"	Ellis-Bextor; Boyd; Newell	Boyd; Newell	2:48
15.	"Mixed Up World" (Groove Collision Vocal Mix)	Ellis-Bextor; Alexander; Rowe	Alexander; Rowe	6:36

2021 LP edition
No.	Title	Writer(s)	Producer(s)	Length
14.	"The Earth Shook the Devil's Hand"	Ellis-Bextor; Boyd; Newell	Boyd; Newell	2:48
15.	"Yes Sir, I Can Boogie"	Frank Dostal; Rolf Soja	Ian Masterson; Jewels & Stone; Terry Ronald	3:59

== Personnel ==
- Sophie Ellis-Bextor – vocals, keyboards, programming
- Paul Brown – additional vocals (2)
- Damian LeGassick – producer, keyboards, bass, programming, string arrangement
- Gregg Alexander – producer
- Matt Rowe – producer, programming, keyboards
- Jeremy Wheatley – producer, mixing, drums
- Lewis Taylor – guitar, bass
- Rob Davis – guitar
- Ali Staton – mixing, recording
- Paul Gendler – guitar
- Dave Way – mixing
- Rik Simpson – guitar, recording, keyboards, programming
- Winston Rollins – trombone
- Enrico Tomasso – trumpet
- Mike Lovatt – trumpet
- Guy Pratt – bass
- Brio Taliaferro – keyboards, guitar, additional programming
- Giulio Pierucci – piano
- Paul Stewart – drums
- Ross Newell – guitar
- Luís Jardim – percussion
- James Eller – bass
- Steve Sidelnyk – drums, percussion
- Monte Pittman – guitar
- John Smith – recording
- Alex James – bass
- Martin Waugh – guitar
- Bernard Butler – guitar, keyboards, string arrangement
- Andy Maclure – drums
- Carl Membrino – keyboards
- Pablo Cook – percussion
- James Woodrow – guitar

== Charts ==
Chart performance for Shoot from the Hip
Chart (2003)	Peak position
Australian Albums (ARIA)	107
French Albums (SNEP)	99
German Albums (Offizielle Top 100)	84
Mexican Albums (Top 100 Mexico)	25
New Zealand Albums (RMNZ)	39
Scottish Albums (Official Charts)	28
Swiss Albums (Schweizer Hitparade)	35
UK Albums (Official Charts)	19

== Certifications ==
Certifications for Shoot from the Hip
Region	Certification	Certified units/sales
United Kingdom (BPI)	Silver	60,000^{*}
^{*} Sales figures based on certification alone.

== Release history ==
Release history for Shoot from the Hip
Region	Date
United Kingdom	27 October 2003
Various	28 October 2003
United States (digital)	26 June 2007
United Kingdom (vinyl re-release)	25 September 2021
