= Bextor =

Bextor is a surname. Notable people with the surname include:

- Robin Bextor (born 1953), English film and television producer and director
- Sophie Ellis-Bextor (born 1979), English singer-songwriter and model
