= If You Can't Do It When You're Young; When Can You Do It? =

Single by theaudience

from the album Theaudience
- B-side: "There Are Worse Things I Could Do; You & Me on the Run; The Beginning, The Middle & The End"
- Released: 23 February 1998
- Recorded: 1997–1998
- Genre: Rock
- Length: 3:54
- Label: eLLeFFe, Mercury
- Songwriter(s): Billy Reeves
- Producer(s): Billy Reeves

Theaudience singles chronology
"I Got the Wherewithal" (1997)	"If You Can't Do It When You're Young; When Can You Do It?" (1998)	"A Pessimist Is Never Disappointed" (1998)

"If You Can't Do It When You're Young; When Can You Do It?" is a song recorded by British band Theaudience for their debut album, Theaudience. It was released as the album's second single on 23 February 1998, peaking at #48 on the UK Singles Chart. The B-sides for the single include "You & Me on the Run", a song composed by Billy Reeves & Tim Mollett, "The Beginning, The Middle & The End", and "There Are Worse Things I Could Do", a cover from the soundtrack of the film Grease.

== Track listing ==
UK CD single (AUDCD2)

1. "If You Can't Do It When You're Young; When Can You Do It?" – 3:54
2. "There Are Worse Things I Could Do" – 2:21
3. "You & Me on the Run" – 3:22
4. "The Beginning, The Middle & The End" – 8:19

UK Limited Edition Vinyl (AUDVN2)

1. "If You Can't Do It When You You're Young; When Can You Do It?" – 3:54
2. "There Are Worse Things I Could Do" – 2:21
