= Theaudience (album) =

1998 studio album by theaudience

theaudience

Studio album by Theaudience
- Released: 17 August 1998
- Recorded: 1997–1998
- Genres: Britpop; indie rock
- Length: 54:43
- Labels: eLLeFFe; Mercury
- Producers: Nigel Butler; Peter Collins; Angie Dial; Sophie Ellis-Bextor; Ian Grimble; Patch Hannan; Mike Hedges; Dean Mollett; Billy Reeves

Singles from Theaudience
- 1. "I Got the Wherewithal" Released: 27 October 1997; 2. "If You Can't Do It When You're Young; When Can You Do It?" Released: 23 February 1998; 3. "A Pessimist Is Never Disappointed" Released: 11 May 1998; 4. "I Know Enough (I Don't Get Enough)" Released: 27 July 1998

Professional ratings
Review scores
Source	Rating
The Guardian	2/5 stars
The Independent	Positive
Melody Maker	4/5 stars
NME	4/10
Select	4/5 stars

Theaudience is the only album from British band theaudience, released on 17 August 1998 by eLLeFFe and Mercury Records. It peaked at number 22 on the UK Albums Chart. The band featured Sophie Ellis-Bextor on lead vocals.

== Release ==
The album's artwork comes from the video for "I Got the Wherewithal", which was directed by Robin Bextor. Four singles were released from the album. "I Got the Wherewithal" was released in October 1997, peaking at number 170 on the UK Singles Chart. "If You Can't Do It When You're Young; When Can You Do It?" was released in February 1998, peaking at number 48. "A Pessimist Is Never Disappointed" was released in May 1998, peaking at number 27. "I Know Enough (I Don't Get Enough)" was released in July 1998, peaking at number 25. The music video for "If You Can't Do It When You're Young; When Can You Do It?" directed by Sophie's father Robin Bextor featured Sophie Ellis-Bextor's younger sister Martha-Rose playing her. "Keep in Touch" was briefly scheduled as the fifth single from the album, but the release of a fifth single was cancelled.

The original vinyl edition of the album was limited to 1,500 copies, and was pressed on glittery vinyl. On 8 July 2022, Scottish independent label Last Night from Glasgow reissued the album on double vinyl, including the original album across three sides of vinyl, in addition to six bonus tracks on side four.

== Track listing ==
All tracks written by Billy Reeves, except where noted.

1. "A Pessimist Is Never Disappointed" – 3:44
2. "Now That You Are 18" – 2:52
3. "Mr. Doasyouwouldbedoneby" – 3:45
4. "I Know Enough (I Don't Get Enough)" (Reeves, Nigel Butler) – 3:14
5. "Keep in Touch" (Reeves, Kerin Smith) – 3:41
6. "I Got the Wherewithal" – 3:48
7. "Harry Don't Fetch the Water" – 4:37
8. "If You Can't Do It When You're Young; When Can You Do It?" – 3:52
9. "Running Out of Space" – 2:53
10. "You Get What You Deserve" (Reeves, Alison Sweeny, Paul Alexander, Dave Jones) – 4:08
11. "The More There Is to Do" – 4:09
12. "Bells for David Keenan" (Reeves, Butler) – 1:11
13. "Shoebox Song" (Dean Mollett) – 3:34
14. "How's That?" – 6:51
- Limited edition bonus disc
1. "Mr. Doasyouwouldbedoneby" (original version) – 3:51
2. "I Know Enough (I Don't Get Enough)" (original version) – 3:56
3. "A Pessimist Is Never Disappointed" (Blah St acoustic version) – 3:38
4. "You Get What You Deserve" (piano version) – 3:02
5. "Keep in Touch" (piano version) – 4:01
6. "I Can See Clearly" – 3:39

== Personnel ==
Personnel per booklet.

Theaudience

- Sophie Ellis-Bextor
- Billy Reeves
- Dean Mollett
- Kerin Smith
- Patrick Hannan
- Nigel Butler

Design

- Tracy Ward – paintings
- Neil Cooper – portrait photography
- Chris Kidson – studio photos
- Rick Lecoat – design

Production

- Mike Hedges – producer (tracks 1, 7, 9 and 10)
- Ian Grimble – producer (tracks 1, 7, 9 and 10), engineer (tracks 1, 6, 7, 9 and 10)
- Billy Reeves – producer (tracks 2, 3, 5–8, 11 and 14), mixing (tracks 1–3, 5, 7, 9, 10 and 14)
- Peter Collins – producer (track 4)
- Sophie Ellis-Bextor – producer (track 6)
- Patrick Hannan – producer (tracks 11 and 13), engineer (track 7, 9 and 11), mixing (tracks 11 and 13)
- Nigel Butler – producer (track 12), mixing (track 12)
- Angie Dial – producer (track 12)
- Dean Mollett – producer (track 13)
- Jeremy Wheatley – engineer (tracks 2, 3, 5 and 13), mixing (tracks 1–3, 5, 7, 9, 10 and 13)
- Paul David Hager – engineer (track 4), mixing (tracks 4)
- Nick Hannan – engineer (track 6, 11, 13 and 14), mixing (tracks 11 and 14)
- David Bascombe – mixing (tracks 6 and 8)

== Charts ==
1998 chart performance for Theaudience
Chart (1998)	Peak position
Scottish Albums (Official Charts)	49
UK Albums (Official Charts)	22

2022 chart performance for Theaudience
Chart (2022)	Peak position
Scottish Albums (OCC)	3
UK Albums Sales (OCC)	11
UK Physical Albums (OCC)	11
UK Vinyl Albums (OCC)	4
