= DanceX =

- DanceX logo
- Presented by: Ben Shephard
- Starring: Arlene's Panel: Arlene Phillips; Ashley Wallen; Joshua Alamu; Bruno's Panel: Bruno Tonioli; Derek Hough; CeCe Sammy
- Country of origin: United Kingdom
- Original language: English
- No. of episodes: 7

Production
- Producer: BBC

Original release
- Network: BBC One
- Release: 14 July – 25 August 2007

DanceX is a reality television show which aired in the UK on BBC One in 2007. It followed the format of live shows in which two teams of male and female dancers competed to form a new dance group. Team Bruno won the show on 25 August.

== Presenter and team leaders ==
The show was hosted by GMTV and former Xtra Factor presenter Ben Shephard. The two teams were led by Hot Gossip founder Arlene Phillips and fellow Strictly Come Dancing judge and choreographer Bruno Tonioli.

Both Arlene and Bruno had their own assistants, a choreographer and a vocal coach. Arlene was joined by Ashley Wallen, one of Britain's leading choreographers, and expert vocal coach Joshua Alamu. Bruno's assistants were Derek Hough, dancer and choreographer, and CeCe Sammy, vocal coach.

The dance teams' performances were judged by the British public using the ubiquitous telephone vote.

=== Dance Xtra ===
Straight after the live BBC One DanceX show, there was a spin-off show, Dance Xtra, on BBC Three. Presenters Angellica Bell and Rufus Hound chatted to Arlene and Bruno about how both groups had performed each evening. There were extra interviews with the eliminated dancer and unseen footage was shown. Each week Dance Xtra had a celebrity guest and fan of the show.

== Auditions ==
Auditions were held in the following places:

- Glasgow: Friday 4 May
- Manchester: Friday 11th/Saturday 12 May
- Bristol: Thursday 17 May
- London: Friday 18th/Saturday 19 May

== Shows ==
=== Show one ===
In the first show the sixteen finalists were chosen. They were (in alphabetical order):

- Ashley Shaw
- Becky Leung
- Bobby Windebank
- Camilla Hardy
- Chelsey Reynolds
- Claire Mealor
- Phoenix
- Daniel Uppal
- Daniele Arbisi
- Emanuel Tabone
- Ife Kuku
- Jamie Meek
- Kalvin Lamey
- Marie McGonigle
- Marcquelle Ward
- Rana Roy

=== Show two ===
In the second show, after seeing all the dancers perform again, Arlene Phillips and Bruno Tonioli chose who was going to be in their respective dance groups. First they picked three boys each, with Bruno starting first; these went as follows:

Arlene's group	Bruno's group
Emanuel Tabone; Daniel Uppal; Kalvin Lamey	Phoenix; Marquelle Ward; Daniele Arbisi

Then it was the turn of the girls. Once again Bruno got the chance to pick first:

Arlene's group	Bruno's group
Ashley Shaw; Chelsey Reynolds; Ife Kuku	Rana Roy; Marie McGonigle; Becky Leung

After choosing their boys and girls, the remaining four dancers had to dance again for the chance to be in either Arelene's or Bruno's dance group. Bruno was first to choose and he chose Claire Mealor to be in his group, while Arlene picked second and chose to have Camilla Hardy in her dance group. This meant that Bobby Windebank and Jamie Meek were out of the competition and the two groups were now as follows (in alphabetical order):

Arlene's group	Bruno's group
Ashley Shaw; Camilla Hardy; Chelsey Reynolds; Daniel Uppal; Emanuel Tabone; Ife Kuku; Kalvin Lamey	Becky Leung; Claire Mealor; Daniele Arbisi; Marie McGonigle; Marquelle Ward; Phoenix; Rana Roy

=== Show three ===
The theme of the show was "Latin". The two groups performed separately in three rounds: dancing, singing, and both at the same time. The public were asked to vote for which group they preferred, and polling the most votes was Arlene's, which meant Bruno had to choose one of his members to leave the group. His bottom two were Rebecca and Daniele. After a head-to-head "dance-off", Bruno decided to choose Rebecca to leave the competition. The groups post show three were as follows:

Arlene's group	Bruno's group
Ashley Shaw; Camilla Hardy; Chelsey Reynolds; Daniel Uppal; Emanuel Tabone; Ife Kuku; Kalvin Lamey	Claire Mealor; Daniele Arbisi; Marie McGonigle; Marquelle Ward; Phoenix; Rana Roy

=== Show four ===
The theme of the show was "rock 'n' roll". Arlene's group won the public vote once again and Bruno once again had to choose a person to leave his group. This time he chose Daniele, with Claire given a second chance. The groups post show four were as follows:

Arlene's group	Bruno's group
Ashley Shaw; Camilla Hardy; Chelsey Reynolds; Daniel Uppal; Emanuel Tabone; Ife Kuku; Kalvin Lamey	Claire Mealor; Marie McGonigle; Marquelle Ward; Phoenix; Rana Roy

=== Show five ===
The theme of the show was "Las Vegas". Both groups expressed surprise at the previous week's result, and this time Bruno's group won the vote. Arlene chose Ife and Camilla to perform again, and voted off Ife. The groups post show five were as follows:

Arlene's group	Bruno's group
Ashley Shaw; Camilla Hardy; Chelsey Reynolds; Daniel Uppal; Emanuel Tabone; Kalvin Lamey	Claire Mealor; Marie McGonigle; Marquelle Ward; Phoenix; Rana Roy

=== Show six ===
The theme of the show was "Disco". Team Bruno won the public vote for a second time. Arlene chose Kalvin and Ashley to perform again, and reluctantly asked Kalvin to leave the competition. The groups post show six were as follows:

Arlene's group	Bruno's group
Ashley Shaw; Camilla Hardy; Chelsey Reynolds; Daniel Uppal; Emanuel Tabone	Claire Mealor; Marie McGonigle; Marquelle Ward; Phoenix; Rana Roy

=== Show seven ===
The series finale allowed the teams to perform what they liked, but the third performance had to be a repeat of what they thought was their best from the previous shows, as well as what would be the winning group's first single. After a live performance by Rihanna, Team Bruno were announced as the winners.

== The winning group ==
Bruno's group
- Claire Mealor
- Marie McGonigle
- Marcquelle Ward
- Phoenix
- Rana Roy

The group signed a recording contract with Gut Records and released their first single Dancing in Repeat (written by Oscar Gorres and Swedish popstar Danny Saucedo) as a digital download on 27 August 2007. It was released as a CD single on 3 September and reached No. 91 in the UK Singles Chart.

Claire, Marie, Marcquelle, Phoenix and Rana began recording an album and are preparing to support Rihanna on her UK tour. Readers of The Sun newspaper chose the band's name: Pulse.

== Special acts ==
Sophie Ellis-Bextor performed If I Can't Dance a song from her new album Trip The Light Fantastic on show three, 28 July 2007.

Duncan James performed All I Care About Is Love from the musical Chicago on show four, 4 August 2007. He is currently starring as Billy Flynn in the West End production of Chicago.

Girls Aloud performed their new single Sexy! No, No, No... on the 18 August show, when the groups did disco routines and songs.

Rihanna performed her new single "Shut Up and Drive" on the final night.

== Ratings ==
The show got off to a good start with 4.88m, and landing #9 in BBC1's Top 30 Highest Viewed Shows of the week ending 15 July 2007. By Episode 2, the show lost around 300,000 viewers – averaging at 4.50m viewers, at no. 13 on the BBC1 Top 30 of the week. Episode 3 was less successful, averaging just 4.00m viewers, and placing no. 19 on the BBC1 Top 30 of the week. By Episode 4, the show took a huge decline in viewing figures, ending up with just 2.99m viewers – shedding over 1 million viewers from the previous week – and landing on only No. 29 for the BBC's Top 30 of the week. Episode 5 was still not too successful, but brought about 700,000 viewers back, compared to the previous week. It attracted 3.70m, and landed No. 24 on BBC1's Top 30 of the week. The 6th week of the show had competition in the form of ITV1's The X Factor series 4 launch., which attracted an average of 9.5m viewers, peaking at 10.7m (48% viewing share). DanceX week 6 gathered 2.7m (13% viewing share). The final of DanceX attracted a mild 3.67m and No. 23 on the BBC1 top 30 of the week, not incredible compared to The X Factor's average of 8.87m, but still not disastrous.

=== Weekly averages ===
- Week 1 – 4.88m
- Week 2 – 4.50m
- Week 3 – 4.00m
- Week 4 – 2.99m
- Week 5 – 3.70m
- Week 6 – 2.7m
- Week 7 – 3.67m

The series average was 3.77m.

== International ==
Shortly after launching in the UK and gaining decent ratings, ABC in the United States acquired the local rights to the DanceX format. It was later announced that the show had been picked up as a show to premiere in January 2008. The live program, called Dance War: Bruno vs. Carrie Ann, was to have two teams led by ABC Dancing with the Stars judges Bruno Tonioli and Carrie Ann Inaba. Dancing with the Stars Season Two winner Drew Lachey was slated to host the program.
