= Trip the Light Fantastic (Sophie Ellis-Bextor album) =

Studio album by Sophie Ellis-Bextor
- Released: 18 May 2007
- Recorded: 2005–07
- Genres: Pop; dance-pop; electropop
- Length: 53:27
- Label: Fascination
- Producers: Greg Kurstin; Matt Prime; Jeremy Wheatley; Brio Taliaferro; Matt Rowe; Richard Stannard; Dimitri Tikovoi; Liam Howe; Xenomania; Pascal Gabriel

Sophie Ellis-Bextor chronology
Shoot from the Hip (2003)	Trip the Light Fantastic (2007)	Make a Scene (2011)

Singles from Trip the Light Fantastic
- 1. "Catch You" Released: 19 February 2007; 2. "Me and My Imagination" Released: 7 May 2007; 3. "Today the Sun's on Us" Released: 13 August 2007

Trip the Light Fantastic is the third studio album by British singer and songwriter Sophie Ellis-Bextor. It was released on 21 May 2007 by Fascination Records following the release of the lead single, "Catch You" and the second single, "Me and My Imagination". The album was available to stream via the internet on 18 May 2007, three days before the official release date. It debuted on the UK Albums Chart at number 7.

"Today the Sun's on Us" was the third single released from the album on 13 August 2007, causing the album to re-enter the UK Albums Chart at number 39. In an interview with Digital Spy, Ellis-Bextor confirmed that the fourth single from the album was to be "If I Can't Dance", and on 5 May 2008, the single was released exclusively via the iTunes Store. The song also appeared on the soundtrack to the film St Trinian's.

It received mostly positive reviews from music critics, with many commending the album for being an enjoyable, "glossy" dance record. The album became Ellis-Bextor's second studio album to be available digitally in the United States.

== Background ==
In an interview for Digital Spy, Ellis-Bextor claimed she recorded four duets for the album, however, decided not to include any of them on request of her record label. Despite this, Dan Gillespie Sells provides backing vocals for two songs on the album, and Fred Schneider provides backing vocals on another. Originally, Ellis-Bextor claimed she would not appear on the album's cover, however, she later claimed that she had changed her mind. She commented, "It's sparkly, but hopefully it's got a bit more depth than just a nice picture of me on the cover!" Ellis-Bextor worked on the album with someone she regarded as "a French guy named Dimitri", who was rumoured to be Dimitri from Paris, but turned out to be Dimitri Tikovoi. She also worked on the album with her ex-bandmate Kerin Smith, of theaudience. The opening line in "If I Can't Dance" is, according to Ellis-Bextor in an interview for The Times website, a famous quote by feminist anarchist Emma Goldman. She also revealed that she wrote around eighty songs for the album, and later admitted, "That's how many demos exist. Overall, it's probably knocking on for triple figures I'd say." She revealed that she had plans to release a song called "Hype", which sampled Kraftwerk's "The Model", but the record label denied her permission. Following its release in Australia, the album went to the top ten on the Australian iTunes pop albums chart and the top 40 on the main albums chart, but failed to chart on the ARIA Charts.

== Singles ==
"Catch You" was released as the album's lead single in February 2007. It is a pop rock, electronic song and talks about Ellis-Bextor chasing the guy that she wants. It received mostly positive reviews from music critics, who commended the infusion of rock guitars and electronic beats, while calling it a strident and very good song. A music video was directed by Sophie Muller and it shows Ellis-Bextor chasing someone in Venice. The song performed moderately on the charts, reaching number 8 on the UK Singles Chart, peaking inside the top twenty on the Italian and Russian Singles Chart and inside the top fifty on the charts of other countries.

"If You Go" was released as a promo single on iTunes in March 2007.

"Me and My Imagination" was its follow-up, hitting the market in May 2007. It is a dance-pop, disco song and its lyrics advise an overeager suitor to play harder to get. It only reached number twenty-three on the UK Singles Chart. It received acclaim from music critics, who named it a brilliant and irresistible slice of pop. The song was the cause of controversy because of an unexpected delay in its release on iTunes.

"Today the Sun's on Us" was the third single, being released in August. It is a mid-tempo ballad written about "giving yourself permission to enjoy things when the going is good, despite the fact you know the good may not last forever". It received generally favourable reviews from music critics, who called it "brilliant". However, some criticised her vocals, calling it "limited". The single spent one week in the UK Singles Chart, where it peaked at number 64.

A fourth single was expected to be released in May 2008, which was "If I Can't Dance", but was eventually delayed and never released.

== Critical reception ==
Professional ratings
Review scores
Source	Rating
AllMusic	4/5 stars
BBC Music	favourable
Digital Spy	4/5 stars
The Guardian	3/5 stars
Metro	4/5 stars
NME	6/10
The Observer	mixed
This Is Fake DIY	4/5 stars
Virgin Media	2.5/5 stars
Yahoo!	6/10

The album received positive reviews from most music critics. K. Ross Hoffman of AllMusic gave the album 4 out of 5 stars, writing "A welcome return from one of the most sophisticated and distinctive voices in British dance-pop, Trip the Light Fantastic is easily Sophie Ellis-Bextor's most dynamic album to date. Markedly more consistent than its enjoyable-but-spotty predecessors, but also – more importantly – far more gutsy, varied and vital, its many strong points are the most exciting of her career." Hoffman also named it a "tremendously enjoyable record that stands as a shining example of the state of the art." Nick Levine of Digital Spy also gave the album a rating of 4 out of 5 stars, writing "Trip the Light Fantastic easily fulfils the promise of its fizzy singles." Stuart McCaighy of This Is Fake DIY gave the album 8 out of 10 stars, writing that Ellis-Bextor "has a class, an air which most pop stars lack." Pete Cashmore of NME gave the album a rating of 6 out of 10 stars, writing "Ellis-Bextor proffers lush, mechanical dance muzak, which is probably not what you want, so it helps that with the swooping 'New York City Lights' she is also delivering good pop songs. As pointlessly opulent as walking into a Walkabout pub and ordering a Cosmopolitan, and no less satisfying."

Talia Kraines of BBC Music opined that "Whether there is room for such a manicured, glossy pop star in the musical landscape of 2007 is a different matter. Sophie's certainly made the pop record she wants to, and if it all sounds a tad 2002 then so be it. Good luck to her." Kitty Empire of The Observer wrote: "Ellis Bextor has panniers of the stuff, but you wouldn't know it from this collection of deeply ordinary songs." Matt O'Leary of Virgin Media gave the album 2.5 out of 5 stars, but ultimately wrote that "While this is a super-glossy piece of work, it does nothing to dispel the image of Sophie Ellis-Bextor as making club music it's OK for your mum to like. By no means bad." Emily MacKay of Yahoo! Music gave the album 6 out of 10 stars, writing "All in all, though, Trip the Light Fantastic stumbles short of the disco sublime it tries so hard to invoke. Keep on trying, Sophie."

The album peaked at number 4 on Billboard's best albums of 2007. Pitchfork ranked "Me and My Imagination" number 87 on its list of the 100 greatest tracks of 2007.

== Track listing ==
No.	Title	Writer(s)	Producer(s)	Length
1.	"Catch You"	Cathy Dennis; Greg Kurstin	Kurstin	3:19
2.	"Me and My Imagination"	Ellis-Bextor; Matt Prime; Hannah Robinson	Prime; Jeremy Wheatley*; Brio Taliaferro*	3:27
3.	"Today the Sun's on Us"	Ellis-Bextor; Steve Robson; Nina Woodford	Wheatley; Taliaferro	4:18
4.	"New York City Lights"	Ellis-Bextor; Matt Rowe; Richard "Biff" Stannard	Rowe; Stannard	3:53
5.	"If I Can't Dance"	Ellis-Bextor; Dimitri Tikovoi	Tikovoi; Wheatley*; Taliaferro*	3:27
6.	"The Distance Between Us"	Ellis-Bextor; Liam Howe	Howe	4:26
7.	"If You Go"	Ellis-Bextor; Brian Higgins; Miranda Cooper; Tim Powell	Higgins; Xenomania	3:27
8.	"Only One"	Ellis-Bextor; Dan Gillespie Sells	Tikovoi; Wheatley*	3:46
9.	"Love Is Here"	Ellis-Bextor; Sells	Wheatley; Taliaferro	4:35
10.	"New Flame"	Ellis-Bextor; Tikovoi	Tikovoi; Wheatley*; Taliaferro*	2:52
11.	"China Heart"	Ellis-Bextor; Pascal Gabriel; Robinson	Gabriel	3:44
12.	"What Have We Started?"	Ellis-Bextor; Gabriel; Robinson	Gabriel	4:08

UK, Australian and digital North American release bonus tracks
No.	Title	Writer(s)	Producer(s)	Length
13.	"Can't Have It All"	Ellis-Bextor; Eg White	Wheatley; Taliaferro	4:08
14.	"Supersonic"	Ellis-Bextor; Fred Schneider; Bruce Brody; James Staub	Wheatley; Taliaferro	4:03

UK digital edition and 2024 digital reissue bonus tracks
No.	Title	Writer(s)	Length
15.	"Me and My Imagination" (StoneBridge Vocal Mix)	Ellis-Bextor; Matt Prime; Hannah Robinson	7:21
16.	"Catch You" (Moto Blanco Club Mix)	Cathy Dennis; Greg Kurstin	8:26

2022 deluxe edition
No.	Title	Writer(s)	Producer(s)	Length
13.	"Can't Have It All"	Ellis-Bextor; White	Wheatley; Taliaferro	4:08
14.	"Supersonic"	Ellis-Bextor; Schneider; Brody; Staub	Wheatley; Taliaferro	4:03
15.	"Down with Love" (B-side of "Catch You")	Ellis-Bextor; Rob Davis; Barry Stone; Julian Gingell	Stone; Gingell	3:55
16.	"Move to the Music" (B-side of "Me and My Imagination")	Ellis-Bextor; Pascal Gabriel	Gabriel	3:46
17.	"Here's to You" (B-side of "Me and My Imagination")	Ellis-Bextor; Anu Pillai	Pillai	2:46
18.	"Duel" (B-side of "Today the Sun's on Us")	Claudia Brücken; Michael Mertens; Ralf Dörper	Stone; Gingell	4:24

(* – additional production)

Notes

- Before the final 2024 digital reissue, there were certain special digital editions of Trip the Light Fantastic uploaded containing either "Can’t Have It All" or "Supersonic" as a sole bonus track for select regions.

== Charts ==
Chart performance for Trip the Light Fantastic
Chart (2007)	Peak position
Australian Albums (ARIA)	108
European Albums (Billboard)	28
French Albums (SNEP)	81
German Albums (Offizielle Top 100)	87
Irish Albums (IRMA)	93
Mexican Albums (AMPROFON)	85
Scottish Albums (Official Charts)	19
Swiss Albums (Schweizer Hitparade)	28
UK Albums (Official Charts)	7

== Certifications ==
Region	Certification	Certified units/sales
Russia (NFPF)	Gold	10,000^{*}
^{*} Sales figures based on certification alone.
