= If I Can't Dance =

Promotional single by Sophie Ellis-Bextor

from the album Trip the Light Fantastic
- Released: 5 May 2008
- Recorded: London, United Kingdom
- Genre: Dance-pop; electropop; disco
- Length: 3:26
- Label: Fascination
- Songwriters: Sophie Ellis-Bextor; Dimitri Tikovoi
- Producers: Dimitri Tikovoi; Brio Taliaferro; Jeremy Wheatley

Audio
- "If I Can't Dance" on YouTube

"If I Can't Dance" is a song by British recording artist Sophie Ellis-Bextor for her third studio album, Trip the Light Fantastic (2007). It was written by Ellis-Bextor and Dimitri Tikovoi, while production was handled by Tikovi, with additional production by Brio Taliaferro and Jeremy Wheatley. It is a dance-pop, electropop and disco song and a reference to the famous paraphrase of Emma Goldman: "If I can't dance, I don't want to be part of your revolution".

The song was scheduled to be released as the fourth single from the album, which was confirmed by the singer herself; however, a full release did not eventuate. The song was also included on the soundtrack to the 2007 film St Trinian's and received mostly positive reviews from music critics, with many calling it a "delightfully self-aware cut which transport us to a world where the glitter ball never stops spinning."

== Background and release ==
In an interview with Digital Spy in August 2007, Ellis-Bextor announced that "If I Can't Dance" was to be released as the fourth single from her album Trip the Light Fantastic in November 2007. She performed the song live for the first time in July 2007 on the BBC1 Saturday night game show, DanceX. Around this time, Sophie announced that she was unsure if she wished to release "If I Can't Dance", due to the popularity of "Love Is Here" amongst fans, and that after her performance on DanceX, fans had urged her to release "Love Is Here" instead. She then announced plans for releasing "If I Can't Dance" would stay, and that "Love Is Here" would become the fifth single instead. On 9 October 2007, Ellis-Bextor announced that plans to release "If I Can't Dance" and "Love Is Here" had been cancelled, and that her record label would release a new, unreleased song in their place. However, when the song was featured on the St Trinian's soundtrack, which was released on 10 December 2007, rumours spurred that the single would, in fact, be released.

In January 2008, Ellis-Bextor made a shock announcement that the Trip the Light Fantastic era was concluded, and soon after, plans for a Greatest Hits compilation expected for release in Autumn 2008 came to light. Rumours regarding the single's release again became rife when the track was confirmed for inclusion on the compilation, but Ellis-Bextor confirmed in February 2008 the track would not be released as a single. Regardless, on 5 May 2008, a single release of "If I Can't Dance" surprisingly appeared on the iTunes Store without any prior announcement or confirmation, complete with new artwork and backed with the B-side "Can't Have It All". Days later, the single was removed from the store, and since, fans have wondered if the single was listed by Fascination, due to its removal just days later. This also meant the single failed to chart anywhere.

== Composition ==
"If I Can't Dance" (2007)
A 30 second sample of "If I Can't Dance".

"If I Can't Dance" was written by Sophie Ellis-Bextor and Dimitri Tikovoi, while production was handled by Tikovi, with additional production by Brio Taliaferro and Jeremy Wheatley. It draws from the dance-pop, electropop and disco genres. The song is a reference to the famous quote from Emma Goldman, "If I can't dance, I don't want to be part of your revolution". Goldman never said these exact words but she did convey this idea in an encounter with a young revolutionary that she mentions in her autobiography Living My Life. Lyrically, it finds Sophie tartly telling her stiff limbed lover, "Oh darling, don't be so unkind / The beat must never be denied".

== Critical reception ==
The song received mostly positive reviews from music critics. Emily Mackay of Yahoo! Music wrote that "'If I Can't Dance', with its jerky, Girls Aloud-esque rhythmm, is sure-footed sparkler." Kitty Empire of The Observer called it "another delightfully self-aware cut which features our ice maiden twitching a buttock to some bloopy percolations", while Talia Kraines of BBC Music wrote that the song "transport[s] us to a world where the glitter ball never stops spinning." K. Ross Hoffman of Allmusic noted that it is a "Xenomania-esque stomp." Nick Levine of Digital Spy commented, "When she declares, halfway through the album, 'If I can't dance, I don't want any part of your revolution', you can't help but wonder, just for a moment, how on earth those pesky Frenchies of 1786 [sic] managed to storm the Bastille without Trip the Light Fantastic as a soundtrack."

== Track listing ==
1. "If I Can't Dance" – 3:26
2. "Can't Have It All" – 4:11

== Credits and personnel ==
- Songwriting – Sophie Ellis-Bextor, Dimitri Tikovoi
- Production – Dimitri Tikovoi
- Additional production by Brio Taliaferro, Jeremy Wheatley
- All instruments by Dimitri Tikovoi

Credits adapted from the liner notes of Trip the Light Fantastic, Fascination Records.
