= Ashley Wallen =

Australian choreographer

Ashley Wallen is an Australian choreographer whose work includes collaborations with the Sugababes, Kylie Minogue, Will Young and Mariah Carey.

Raised on the Gold Coast, Queensland, Wallen trained in jazz before beginning his professional career on Kylie Minogue's Intimate and Live tour in 1998. He later returned to Australia and moved into choreography, with an early project involving a Sugababes music video directed by Michael Gracey. In 2009, Wallen choreographed T-Mobile's Dance commercial, staged with 350 dancers at Liverpool Street station in London as part of the company's Life's for Sharing advertising campaign. Wallen also choreographed Tokyo Dancing Hotel, a 2010 Lipton Ice Tea commercial starring Hugh Jackman and directed by Michael Gracey.

His television work included serving as resident dance captain on The X Factor and appearing as a panelist for Arlene Phillips on BBC One's DanceX. In theatre, he choreographed the original West End production of Ghost the Musical (2011), its Broadway production (2012) and the Australian production (2016).

His collaborations with Minogue continued through the Kiss Me Once Tour (2014) and Golden Tour (2018–2019), both of which he choreographed.

In film, Wallen choreographed the 2017 musical The Greatest Showman, starring Hugh Jackman. For their work on the film, he and Shannon Holtzapffel received the 2018 Chita Rivera Award for Outstanding Choreography in a Theatrical Release.

His later film credits include Jingle Jangle: A Christmas Journey (2020), starring Forest Whitaker, and Cinderella (2021), both of which he choreographed.
