= Catch You =

2007 single by Sophie Ellis-Bextor

Single by Sophie Ellis-Bextor

from the album Trip the Light Fantastic
- B-side: "Down with Love"
- Released: 19 February 2007
- Recorded: 2006
- Studio: Echo (East Road, London)
- Genre: Pop rock
- Length: 3:17
- Label: Fascination
- Songwriters: Cathy Dennis; Greg Kurstin; Rhys Barker
- Producer: Greg Kurstin

Sophie Ellis-Bextor singles chronology
| "Circles (Just My Good Time)" (2005) | "Catch You" (2007) | "Me and My Imagination" (2007) |

Audio sample
- file; help

Music video
- "Sophie Ellis-Bextor - Catch You" on YouTube

"Catch You" is a song by the British singer Sophie Ellis-Bextor for her third studio album, Trip the Light Fantastic (2007). It was written by Cathy Dennis, Rhys Barker and Greg Kurstin and produced by Kurstin. It was released as the album's first single on 19 February 2007. "Catch You" is a pop rock song and talks about Bextor chasing the guy that she wants.

It received mostly positive reviews from music critics, who commended the infusion of rock guitars and electronic beats, while calling it a strident and very good song. A music video was directed by Sophie Muller and it shows Sophie chasing a guy in Venice. The song performed moderately on the charts, reached number three on the Scottish Singles Charts, number eight on the UK Singles Chart, peaking inside the top twenty on the Italian and Russian Singles Chart and inside the top fifty on the other countries.

== Background and composition ==
The single was first announced on New Year's Eve 2006, where Ellis-Bextor performed the song on the BBC's "New Year Live" show. "Catch You" was written by Cathy Dennis and co-written by Greg Kurstin and Rhys Barker and produced by Greg Kurstin. It is a pop rock song and combines guitars, zingy keyboards, nu wave angular guitars with a nagging pop melody. The lyrics concern Sophie possibly bugging various parts of her love interest's flat (mailbox, "easy chair", flatscreen), in the hope that she will "catch him".

== Critical reception ==
K. Ross Hoffman of Allmusic commented, "She sounds dramatically reinvigorated here, with a notable infusion of rock guitars and often a forceful, even menacing, electro edge to the productions, evident right out the gate in this strident, barnstorming first single." Nick Levine of Digital Spy called it "a turbo-charged stalker-pop." Emily MacKay of Yahoo! Music called it "a merciless first strike, a crisp, laser-cut, feather-light puff of dance-floor ephemera sprinkled with disco 'pow!'s, its '70s synth-Chinoiserie chorus given an icy aloofness by Sophie's plummy delivery." Stuart Waterman of Popjustice commented: "It is both a very good song and an excellent advertisement for romantic lunacy. It sounds not unlike what would happen if the Sugababes kidnapped Avril Lavigne and bullied her into playing guitar on one of their more 'upbeat' numbers."

Talia Kraines of BBC Music wrote that the song "gave us a grittier Sophie." Stuart McCaighy of This Is Fake DIY gave the song a mixed review, commenting "It was perhaps a touch one-dimensional, too 'of the moment' for a lead single; its chorus dragged rather than ignited." However, Kitty Empire of The Observer expressed: "It's a rubberised stab of bunny-boiler club-pop, which deserved to chart higher than number 8."

== Chart performance ==
When the song was released, its immediate competition included Kelis's single "Lil Star", The Fray's "How to Save a Life", Take That's "Shine", Justin Timberlake's "What Goes Around... Comes Around" and Mika's "Grace Kelly". "Catch You" peaked at No. 8 on the UK Singles Chart. The single also peaked at No. 33 on the ARIA Singles Chart and at No. 7 on the ARIA Dance Chart. The song also reached the B-list of Radio 1's official playlist and the A-list of BBC Radio 2's official playlist. The song stayed in the UK Top 40 for two months and went to sell 148,000 copies.

== Music video ==
The music video was subsequently filmed in Venice by Sophie Muller, and was released on 13 January 2007. The video has been compared to the movie Don't Look Now.

== Track listings ==
- 2-track single
1. "Catch You" – 3:17
2. "Down with Love" – 3:55
- Maxi-single
1. "Catch You" – 3:17
2. "Down with Love" – 3:55
3. "Catch You" (Moto Blanco Radio Edit) – 3:31
4. "Catch You" (Riff & Rays Radio Edit) – 3:35
5. "Catch You" (Music Video) – 3:27
- 12_inch vinyl
1. "Catch You" (Moto Blanco Club Mix) – 8:29
2. "Catch You" (Moto Blanco Dub) – 6:49
3. "Catch You" (Digital Dog Mix) – 6:37
4. "Catch You" (Riff & Rays Mix) – 8:19
- 12-inch picture disc
1. "Catch You" – 3:17
2. "Catch You" (Jay Cox's Fizzekal Half Dub Remix) – 6:08
3. "Catch You" (Moto Blanco Radio Edit) – 3:31
4. "Catch You" (Digital Dog Mix) – 6:37
- Digital single (2024)
1. "Catch You" – 3:19
2. "Down with Love" – 3:56
3. "Catch You" (Riff & Rays Radio Edit) – 3:35
4. "Catch You" (Riff & Rays Mix) – 8:20
5. "Catch You" (Digital Dog Mix) – 6:36
6. "Catch You" (Jay Cox's Fizzekal Half Dub) – 6:08
7. "Catch You" (Moto Blanco Radio Mix) – 3:31

== Credits and personnel ==
Credits are adapted from the liner notes of Trip the Light Fantastic.

Studio

- Recorded at Echo Studios (East Road, London)

Personnel

- Written by Cathy Dennis, Rhys Barker and Greg Kurstin
- Vocal production by Cathy Dennis
- Engineered by Dario Dendi, assisted by Zoe Smith at Eden Studios
- Assistant vocal recording engineer: Eddie Miller at Echo Studios
- Programming and instruments by Greg Kurstin
- Additional programming by Brio Taliaferro
- Additional guitar: Tim Van Der Kuil
- All music produced and played by Greg Kurstin

== Charts ==
=== Weekly charts ===
Weekly chart performance for "Catch You"
| Chart (2007) | Peak position |
|---|---|
| Australia (ARIA) | 44 |
| Australian Dance (ARIA) | 7 |
| Belgium (Ultratip Bubbling Under Flanders) | 16 |
| CIS Airplay (TopHit) | 20 |
| Ireland (IRMA) | 29 |
| Italy (FIMI) | 14 |
| Netherlands (Dutch Top 40 Tipparade) | 2 |
| Netherlands (Single Top 100) | 84 |
| Russia Airplay (TopHit) | 18 |
| Scottish Singles Sales (Official Charts) | 3 |
| Switzerland (Schweizer Hitparade) | 92 |
| UK Singles (Official Charts) | 8 |

=== Year-end charts ===
Year-end chart performance for "Catch You"
| Chart (2007) | Position |
|---|---|
| CIS (TopHit) | 133 |
| Russia Airplay (TopHit) | 140 |
| UK Singles (OCC) | 144 |
