= I Know Enough (I Don't Get Enough) =

Single by theaudience

from the album Theaudience
- Released: 27 July 1998
- Recorded: 1997–1998
- Genre: Indie rock
- Length: 3:19
- Label: eLLeFFe, Mercury
- Songwriter(s): Billy Reeves
- Producer(s): Peter Collins

Theaudience singles chronology
"A Pessimist Is Never Disappointed" (1998)	"I Know Enough (I Don't Get Enough)" (1998)

Alternative cover
- CD2 Cover

"I Know Enough (I Don't Get Enough)" is a song by Theaudience from their self-titled debut album, Theaudience. It was released as the fourth and final single from the album on 27 July 1998. It reached number 25 on the UK Singles Chart.

B-sides for the single include the album track "Harry, Don't Fetch the Water"; a cover of The Experimental Pop Band's song "Boutique in My Backyard"; a dance track called "The Last Seven Minutes With You"; a short atmospheric instrumental, "Magna Carta vs. Matthew Arnold"; and two remixes by PMFF.

== Critical reception ==
The song garnered a positive response from Select magazine, whose review of the single in August 1998 stated;

'I Know Enough...' is clearly theaudience's best single to date – no mean achievement. It stretches understated, poetic lustings over The Smiths and The Pretenders at their most lithesomely jangling. Like Catatonia, this is dignified mainstream guitar pop at its finest. Double A-side 'Harry, Don't Fetch The Water' is as splendidly obtuse as its title.

== Track listing ==
UK CD single #1 (AUDCD4)

1. "I Know Enough (I Don't Get Enough)" – 3:19
2. "Harry, Don't Fetch the Water" – 4:18
3. "I Know Enough (I Don't Get Enough)" (PMFF Lite Went Down to 'Frisco Just for the Disco Mix) – 7:10

UK CD single #2 (AUDDD4)

1. "I Know Enough (I Don't Get Enough)" – 3:19
2. "Boutique in My Backyard" – 3:35
3. "The Last Seven Minutes With You" – 6:10

UK Limited Edition 7" Vinyl (AUDSV4)

1. "I Know Enough (I Don't Get Enough)" – 3:19
2. "Harry, Don't Fetch the Water" – 4:18
3. "Magna Carta Vs. Matthew Arnold" – 1:33

UK Limited Edition 12" Vinyl (AUDMV4)

1. "I Know Enough (I Don't Get Enough)" (PMFF Lite Went Down to 'Frisco Just for the Disco Mix) – 7:10
2. "I Know Enough (I Don't Get Enough)" (PMFF Instrumental) – 6:33
