= Read My Lips (Sophie Ellis-Bextor album) =

2001 studio album by Sophie Ellis-Bextor

Studio album by Sophie Ellis-Bextor
- Released: 3 September 2001
- Studios: Strongroom (London) (Note: Tracks 1 and 2); Nomis (London) (Note: Track 2); Mayfair (London) (Note: Tracks 3, 4 and 10); Alma St. (Note: Track 6)
- Genres: Dance-pop; disco; electropop
- Length: 50:04
- Label: Polydor
- Producers: Gregg Alexander; Richard Hall; Ben Hillier; Alex James; Korpi & Blackcell; Damian LeGassick; Steve Osborne; Marco Rakascan; Matt Rowe; Gary Wilkinson

Sophie Ellis-Bextor chronology
Read My Lips (2001)	Shoot from the Hip (2003)

Singles from Read My Lips
- 1. "Take Me Home" Released: 13 August 2001; 2. "Murder on the Dancefloor" Released: 3 December 2001; 3. "Get Over You" / "Move This Mountain" Released: 10 June 2002; 4. "Music Gets the Best of Me" Released: 4 November 2002

Read My Lips is the debut studio album by the English singer Sophie Ellis-Bextor, released on 3 September 2001 by Polydor Records. After the disbandment of the Britpop group Theaudience, for which Ellis-Bextor served as lead vocalist, she was signed to Polydor. Prior to the LP's completion, the singer collaborated with several musicians, including band Blur's bassist Alex James, Moby and New Radicals frontman Gregg Alexander. The record was described as a collection of 1980s electronica and 1970s disco music.

Critical response to Read My Lips was polarised, with music critics denouncing its content that was, according to one magazine, Q, of lesser quality than "Groovejet (If This Ain't Love)"—the singer's collaboration with Italian DJ Spiller. The album reached number two on the UK Albums Chart, and has since been certified double platinum by the British Phonographic Industry (BPI). It spawned four singles: "Take Me Home", "Murder on the Dancefloor", double A-side single "Get Over You"/"Move This Mountain" and "Music Gets the Best of Me".

== Background ==
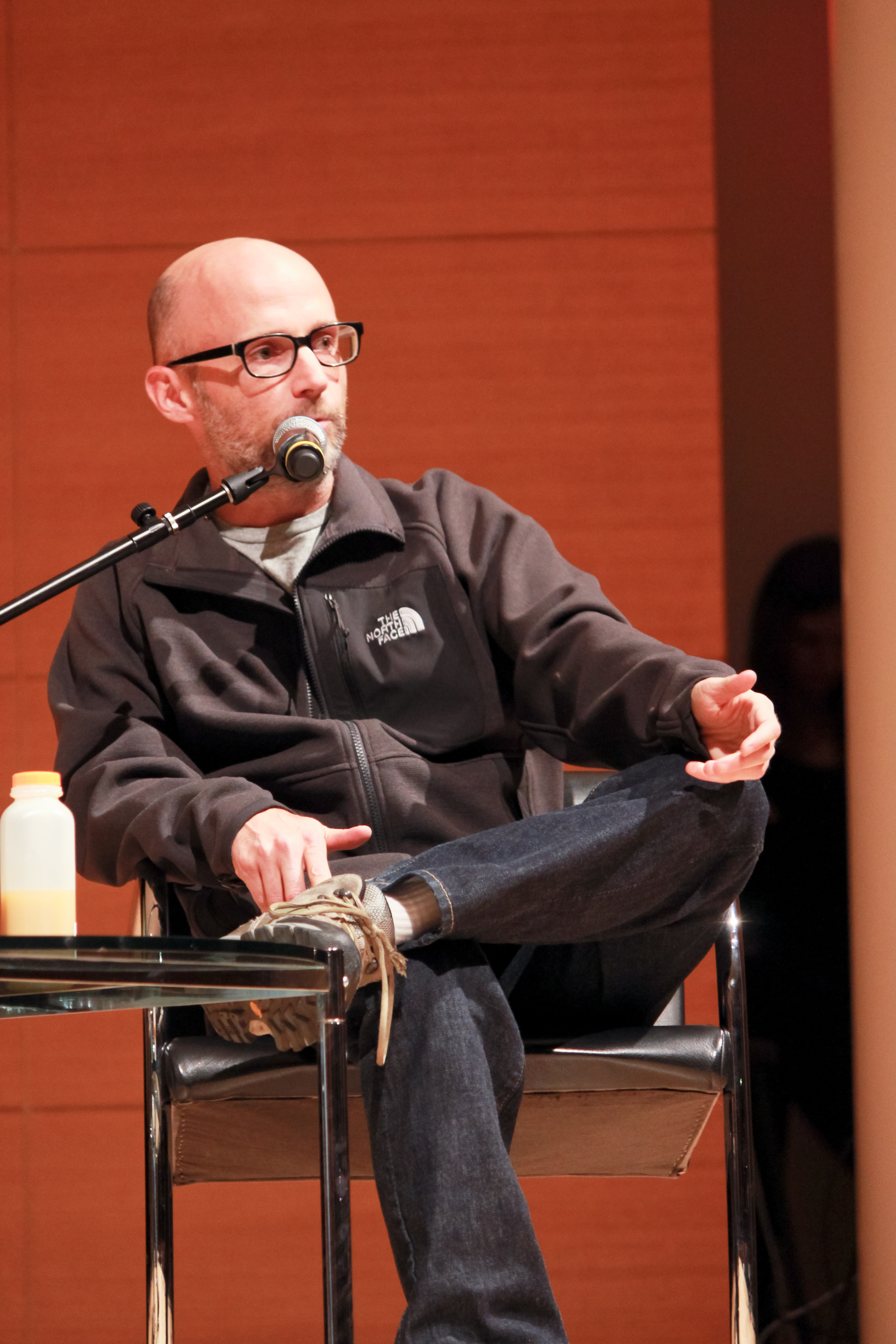
American musician Moby (pictured) sought Ellis-Bextor, so they could work together, due to her "amazing" voice

Following the disbandment of Britpop group Theaudience, Ellis-Bextor provided vocals for the song "Groovejet (If This Ain't Love)" by Italian DJ Spiller. The song was a commercial success, and Ellis-Bextor signed to Polydor. She was contacted by director Baz Luhrmann, who offered her a role in the 2001 film Moulin Rouge!, but the singer refused in order to focus on her career as a recording artist. The success of "Groovejet" also prompted American musician Moby to notice Ellis-Bextor, and revealed interest in working with her due to her "amazing" voice, as he described it. He instructed his record company to "track" Ellis-Bextor "down" so they could start working as soon as Moby finished his tour. The two ultimately wrote five songs in New York City, which did not make the final cut of Read My Lips. Furthermore, she also recorded with Blur bassist Alex James, as well as former frontman of the New Radicals, Gregg Alexander, while Damian LeGassick was recruited for his programming and keyboard work.

The album's title was chosen due to the strong lipstick Ellis-Bextor used for the album artwork, the "Take Me Home" music video and "Read My Lips" is sung in the opening verse of the album track "The Universe Is You". The album photography was shot by Mert Alaş and Marcus Piggot.

== Composition ==
An "eclectic" album, Read My Lips, is a collection of 1980s electronica and 1970s disco. The album opener and first single is a cover version of Cher's 1979 song "Take Me Home", described as a "disco groove". Betty Clarke from The Guardian observed that her voice in the song is reminiscent of Audrey Hepburn's Eliza Doolittle (in the film My Fair Lady). "Move This Mountain", co-written by Alex James, is a "vibrant" ballad with a trip hop-influenced sound. Following track and second single, "Murder on the Dancefloor", is a dance-pop and disco record, that utilises bass guitar and piano in its instrumental. "Sparkle" has "speeding beats and equally speeding keyboards", while "Final Move" contains "tinny beats" and "electro swirls". The latter was deemed a "subdued version" of "Murder on the Dancefloor" with "similar kaleidoscope synth". "I Believe" was described as "funky" and "live-sounding", while "Leave the Others Alone" involves "cold beats" and "big, full-throttle keyboards". "By Chance" was particularly noted for showcasing Ellis-Bextor's accent. Re-release new song "Get Over You" is a "polite" Euro disco take on "I Will Survive".

== Singles and promotion ==
Promotion for Read My Lips launched with the release of "Take Me Home", a cover of the song by singer Cher, which was released on 13 August 2001. Although its production and Ellis-Bextor's vocal performance in the song were heavily criticised, the single reached number two on the UK Singles Chart. After the release of the album, "Murder on the Dancefloor" was serviced as its second single on 3 December 2001. It peaked in the top 10 of the charts in Australia, Austria, Belgium, Canada, Denmark, France, Hungary, Ireland, Italy, Netherlands, New Zealand, Norway, Sweden, Switzerland and the UK. A double A-side single including new re-release song "Get Over You" and original album track "Move This Mountain" was released on 10 June 2002, in a set of two CD singles.

Ellis-Bextor, who had previously felt uncomfortable with the idea of touring, confirmed a UK-only tour in January 2002, which took place from April to May. Later, in July 2002, other dates of the tour were revealed for 2003.

== Critical reception ==
Professional ratings
Review scores
Source	Rating
AllMusic	2.5/5 stars
Entertainment.ie	3/5 stars
The Independent	Mixed
MTV Asia	3/5 stars
Q	2/5 stars
Yahoo! Music	5/10 stars

Toby Manning from Q cited "Take Me Home" and "Move This Mountain" as the album's highlights, but, overall, he thought that the record failed to live up to the standard set by the previous collaboration with Spiller. He also found that the album's music and the distinctive pronunciation of Ellis-Bextor's vocal delivery did not work to complimentary effect. Betty Clarke from The Guardian described the album as a "sophisticated package" but said "there's little to love and even less fun to be had". Kelvin Hayes from AllMusic dubbed it "a disappointing debut from Ellis-Bextor, fusing Human League synth with beats and cinematic strings", but described "Murder on the Dancefloor" as the "shimmering highlight" from the album. A critic from entertainment.ie said "the material on her debut solo album only rarely does justice to her distinctive upper-crust voice", and said that "most of the songs sound laboured and plod where they should swing".

In contrast to the previous reviews, Andrew Arora from Blue Coupe had a more positive response to the record. Arora said "it lands somewhere between Pet Shop Boys' synth-pop faculty and Blondie's Parallel Lines album", although he claimed that fans of "Groovejet (If This Ain't Love)" "should not expect much from this album, but it does deliver a dynamic electro disco sound that is sometimes analogous to her breakthrough-hit single".

== Commercial performance ==
Read My Lips debuted at number four on the UK Albums Chart, selling 23,023 copies in its first week. Although the original ten-track edition dropped down and out of the charts over the next few weeks, a twelve-track UK edition, released in December 2001, peaked at number three in January 2002 following the chart success of "Murder on the Dancefloor". Finally, a fifteen-track edition with a considerably revised running order was released in summer 2002 and peaked at number two—41 weeks after the original edition first charted. The album was certified double platinum by the British Phonographic Industry (BPI) on 21 June 2002. As of December 2020, it had sold 842,000 copies in the United Kingdom.

== Track listing ==
Original release
No.	Title	Writer(s)	Producer(s)	Length
1.	"Take Me Home"	Sophie Ellis-Bextor; Bob Esty; Michele Aller	Damian LeGassick; Jeremy Wheatley^{[a]}	4:07
2.	"Lover"	Ellis-Bextor; Andy Boyd; Ross Newell	Gary Wilkinson; Marco Rakascan^{[a]}	3:24
3.	"Move This Mountain"	Ellis-Bextor; Ben Hillier; Alex James	Hillier; James	4:45
4.	"Murder on the Dancefloor"	Ellis-Bextor; Gregg Alexander	Matt Rowe; Alexander	3:50
5.	"I Believe"	Ellis-Bextor; Tommy Danvers; Jony Rockstar	James; Hillier; Wheatley^{[a]}	4:04
6.	"Leave the Others Alone"	Ellis-Bextor; Boyd; Newell	Rakascan	4:09
7.	"By Chance"	Ellis-Bextor; Rez	Rakascan; Wheatley^{[a]}	4:13
8.	"The Universe Is You"	Ellis-Bextor; Boyd; Newell	Rakascan	3:37
9.	"Is It Any Wonder"	Ellis-Bextor; Richard Hall	Hall; Rakascan^{[a]}	4:25
10.	"Everything Falls into Place"	Ellis-Bextor; Boyd; Newell	Rakascan	3:44

UK edition
No.	Title	Writer(s)	Producer(s)	Length
1.	"Take Me Home"	Ellis-Bextor; Esty; Aller	LeGassick; Wheatley^{[a]}	4:07
2.	"Lover"	Ellis-Bextor; Boyd; Newell	Wilkinson; Rakascan^{[a]}	3:24
3.	"Move This Mountain"	Ellis-Bextor; Hillier; James	Hillier; James	4:45
4.	"Murder on the Dancefloor"	Ellis-Bextor; Alexander	Rowe; Alexander	3:50
5.	"Sparkle" (UK bonus track)	Ellis-Bextor; Boyd; Newell	Rakascan; Wheatley^{[a]}	4:31
6.	"Final Move" (UK bonus track)	Ellis-Bextor; Boyd; Newell	Rakascan	4:44
7.	"I Believe"	Ellis-Bextor; Danvers; Rockstar	James; Hillier; Wheatley^{[a]}	4:04
8.	"Leave the Others Alone"	Ellis-Bextor; Boyd; Newell	Rakascan	4:09
9.	"By Chance"	Ellis-Bextor; Rez	Rakascan; Wheatley^{[a]}	4:13
10.	"The Universe Is You"	Ellis-Bextor; Boyd; Newell	Rakascan	3:37
11.	"Is It Any Wonder"	Ellis-Bextor; Hall	Hall; Rakascan^{[a]}	4:25
12.	"Everything Falls into Place"	Ellis-Bextor; Boyd; Newell	Rakascan	3:44

2002 reissue
No.	Title	Writer(s)	Producer(s)	Length
1.	"Murder on the Dancefloor"	Ellis-Bextor; Alexander	Rowe; Alexander; Wheatley^{[a]}	3:50
2.	"Take Me Home"	Ellis-Bextor; Esty; Aller	LeGassick; Wheatley^{[a]}	4:07
3.	"Lover"	Ellis-Bextor; Boyd; Newell	Wilkinson; Rakascan^{[a]}	3:24
4.	"Move This Mountain"	Ellis-Bextor; Hillier; James	Hillier; James	4:45
5.	"Music Gets the Best of Me"	Ellis-Bextor; Rowe; Alexander	Rowe; Alexander; Steve Osborne; Wheatley^{[a]}	3:39
6.	"The Universe Is You"	Ellis-Bextor; Boyd; Newell	Rakascan	3:37
7.	"I Believe"	Ellis-Bextor; Danvers; Rockstar	James; Hillier; Wheatley^{[a]}	4:04
8.	"Get Over You"	Ellis-Bextor; Rob Davis; Henrik Korpi; Mathias Johansson; Nina Woodford	Korpi & Blackcell	3:15
9.	"By Chance"	Ellis-Bextor; Rez	Rakascan; Wheatley^{[a]}	4:13
10.	"Is It Any Wonder"	Ellis-Bextor; Hall	Hall; Rakascan^{[a]}	4:25
11.	"Leave the Others Alone"	Ellis-Bextor; Boyd; Newell	Rakascan	4:09
12.	"Everything Falls into Place"	Ellis-Bextor; Boyd; Newell	Rakascan	3:44
13.	"Groovejet (If This Ain't Love)" (live version)	Spiller; Ellis-Bextor; Davis; Vincent Montana Jr.; Ronnie Walker	Wheatley^{[a]}	4:00

Brazilian edition bonus track
No.	Title	Writer(s)	Producer(s)	Length
14.	"Murder on the Dancefloor" (Jewels & Stone Mix)	Ellis-Bextor; Alexander	Rowe; Alexander; Jewels & Stone^{[a]}

2002 UK reissue
No.	Title	Writer(s)	Producer(s)	Length
1.	"Murder on the Dancefloor"	Ellis-Bextor; Alexander	Rowe; Alexander; Wheatley^{[a]}	3:50
2.	"Take Me Home"	Ellis-Bextor; Esty; Aller	LeGassick; Wheatley^{[a]}	4:07
3.	"Lover"	Ellis-Bextor; Boyd; Newell	Wilkinson; Rakascan^{[a]}	3:24
4.	"Move This Mountain"	Ellis-Bextor; Hillier; James	Hillier; James	4:45
5.	"Music Gets the Best of Me"	Ellis-Bextor; Rowe; Alexander	Rowe; Alexander; Osborne; Wheatley^{[a]}	3:39
6.	"Sparkle" (UK bonus track)	Ellis-Bextor; Boyd; Newell	Rakascan; Wheatley^{[a]}	4:31
7.	"The Universe Is You"	Ellis-Bextor; Boyd; Newell	Rakascan	3:37
8.	"I Believe"	Ellis-Bextor; Danvers; Rockstar	James; Hillier; Wheatley^{[a]}	4:04
9.	"Get Over You"	Ellis-Bextor; Davis; Korpi; Johansson; Woodford	Korpi & Blackcell	3:15
10.	"By Chance"	Ellis-Bextor; Rez	Rakascan; Wheatley^{[a]}	4:13
11.	"Is It Any Wonder"	Ellis-Bextor; Hall	Hall; Rakascan^{[a]}	4:25
12.	"Leave the Others Alone"	Ellis-Bextor; Boyd; Newell	Rakascan	4:09
13.	"Final Move" (UK bonus track)	Ellis-Bextor; Boyd; Newell	Rakascan	4:44
14.	"Everything Falls into Place"	Ellis-Bextor; Boyd; Newell	Rakascan	3:44
15.	"Groovejet (If This Ain't Love)" (live version)	Spiller; Ellis-Bextor; Davis; Montana; Walker	Wheatley^{[a]}	4:00

2022 deluxe edition
No.	Title	Writer(s)	Producer(s)	Length
15.	"Never Let Me Down" (B-side of "Murder on the Dancefloor")	Ellis-Bextor; Boyd; Newell	Rakascan; Wheatley	3:43
16.	"Groovejet (If This Ain't Love)" (live version)	Spiller; Ellis-Bextor; Davis; Montana; Walker	Wheatley^{[a]}	4:00

Notes

- ^{^[a]} signifies an additional producer

== Personnel ==
Credits adapted from the liner notes of the 2002 UK reissue of Read My Lips.

=== Musicians ===
- Sophie Ellis-Bextor – vocals
- Yoad Nevo – programming, percussion (track 1); guitars (tracks 1–3); keyboards, drum programming (tracks 2, 3)
- Guy Pratt – bass guitar (tracks 1, 2)
- John Themis – guitars (track 1)
- Nick Franglen – programming (track 1)
- Wired Strings – strings (tracks 1, 12)
- Rosie Wetters – string leader (tracks 1, 12)
- Damian LeGassick – programming, keyboards, guitar (track 2)
- Jake Davies – additional programming (track 2)
- Marco Rakascan – programming (tracks 3, 7, 10, 12–14); guitars (track 12)
- Ross Newell – lead guitar (track 3); guitars (tracks 6, 7, 12, 13); keyboards (tracks 6, 7, 13, 14); bass (track 7)
- Juliet Roberts – backing vocals (tracks 3, 7)
- Sylvia Mason-James – backing vocals (tracks 3, 7)
- Ben Hillier – all instruments, programming, piano (track 4); drums (track 8)
- Alex James – bass guitar (track 4), guitars, bass (track 8)
- Stefan Skarbek – programming (track 5)
- Aidan Love – original programming, original arrangement (track 6)
- Saphena Aziz – backing vocals (track 8)
- Jennifer John – backing vocals (track 8)
- Korpi & Blackcell – arrangement (track 9)
- Nina Woodford – background vocals (track 9)
- Emma Holmgren – background vocals (track 9)
- Mathias Johansson – guitar, bass, all keyboards, programming (track 9)
- Henrik Korpi – all keyboards, programming (track 9)

=== Technical ===
- Matt Rowe – production (tracks 1, 5)
- Gregg Alexander – production (tracks 1, 5)
- James Loughrey – engineering (track 1)
- Laurence Brazil – engineering assistance (track 1)
- Jeremy Wheatley – additional production (tracks 1, 2, 5, 6, 8, 10, 15); mixing (tracks 1, 3–5, 7, 12, 15); remix (tracks 2, 6, 8, 10)
- Marco Rakascan – vocal recording (track 1); additional production (tracks 3, 11); production (tracks 6, 7, 10, 12–14); engineering (tracks 7, 12, 14); remix (track 11); mixing (track 13)
- Damian LeGassick – production (track 2)
- Jake Davies – mix engineering, sound design (track 2)
- Bacon & Quarmby – lead vocals recording (track 2)
- Gary Wilkinson – production (track 3)
- Ben Hillier – production (tracks 4, 8)
- Alex James – production (tracks 4, 8)
- Darren Nash – recording assistance (track 4)
- Steve Osborne – production (track 5)
- Rik Simpson – engineering (track 5)
- Andrea Wright – remix assistance, additional production assistance (track 8)
- Korpi & Blackcell – production, recording (track 9)
- Niklas Flyckt – mixing (track 9)
- Göran Elmquist – mix assistance (track 9)
- Richard Hall – production, recording (track 11)
- Ben Thacker – engineering (track 13)
- John Davis – mastering at Sony Music Studios

=== Artwork ===
- Mert Alaş and Marcus Piggot – photography
- Michael Nash Associates – design

== Charts ==
=== Weekly charts ===
2001–2003 weekly chart performance for Read My Lips
Chart (2001–2003)	Peak position
Australian Albums (ARIA)	9
Australian Dance Albums (ARIA)	2
Austrian Albums (Ö3 Austria)	18
Belgian Albums (Ultratop Wallonia)	40
Danish Albums (Hitlisten)	35
Dutch Albums (Album Top 100)	10
European Albums (Music & Media)	6
Finnish Albums (Suomen virallinen lista)	18
French Albums (SNEP)	33
German Albums (Offizielle Top 100)	10
Irish Albums (IRMA)	13
New Zealand Albums (RMNZ)	9
Norwegian Albums (VG-lista)	7
Scottish Albums (Official Charts)	2
Swedish Albums (Sverigetopplistan)	53
Swiss Albums (Schweizer Hitparade)	26
UK Albums (Official Charts)	2

2024 weekly chart performance for Read My Lips
Chart (2024)	Peak position
US Top Dance Albums (Billboard)	3

=== Year-end charts ===
2001 year-end chart performance for Read My Lips
Chart (2001)	Position
UK Albums (OCC)	76

2002 year-end chart performance for Read My Lips
Chart (2002)	Position
Australian Albums (ARIA)	41
Australian Dance Albums (ARIA)	5
Dutch Albums (Album Top 100)	79
European Albums (Music & Media)	40
German Albums (Offizielle Top 100)	84
New Zealand Albums (RMNZ)	20
UK Albums (OCC)	28

== Certifications ==
Certifications for Read My Lips
Region	Certification	Certified units/sales
Australia (ARIA)	Platinum	70,000^{^}
France (SNEP)	Gold	100,000^{*}
New Zealand (RMNZ)	Platinum	15,000^{^}
Switzerland (IFPI Switzerland)	Gold	20,000
United Kingdom (BPI)	2× Platinum	854,282
Summaries
Europe (IFPI)	Platinum	1,000,000^{*}
^{*} Sales figures based on certification alone.^{^} Shipments figures based on certification alone.
