= Groovejet (If This Ain't Love) =

2000 single by Spiller

Single by Spiller
- Released: 14 August 2000
- Genre: Handbag house; Balearic beat; dance-pop; disco
- Length: 6:16 (original version); 3:47 (radio edit)
- Label: Positiva; Atlantic
- Songwriters: Cristiano Spiller; Sophie Ellis-Bextor; Rob Davis
- Producers: Cristiano Spiller; Boris Dlugosch

Spiller singles chronology
"Mighty Miami EP" (2000)	"Groovejet (If This Ain't Love)" (2000)	"Cry Baby" (2002)

Sophie Ellis-Bextor singles chronology
"Groovejet (If This Ain't Love)" (2000)	"Take Me Home" (2001)

Music video
- "Groovejet (If This Ain't Love)" on YouTube

Alternative cover
- French CD single cover

"Groovejet (If This Ain't Love)" is a song by the Italian electronic music DJ and record producer Spiller with lead vocals performed by English singer-songwriter Sophie Ellis-Bextor. Various versions of the single were later featured on the German reissue and some UK editions of Ellis-Bextor's debut solo studio album, Read My Lips (2001). The single was released on 14 August 2000 by Positiva Records and was involved in a highly publicised chart battle against "Out of Your Mind", the first single by Victoria Beckham outside the Spice Girls, in the United Kingdom.

In addition to receiving critical acclaim, "Groovejet" became a hit in Europe and Australia, peaking at number one in the United Kingdom, Australia, Ireland, and New Zealand. In the United States, it reached number three on the Billboard Dance Club Play chart in May 2001. On 22 July 2013, the song was certified platinum by the British Phonographic Industry (BPI), and it has sold 642,000 copies in the UK as of March 2019. Its music video was filmed in Bangkok, Thailand.

== Background ==
The track was originally created by Spiller in early 1999 as an instrumental, with no singing, and was included on the Mighty Miami EP. It is mainly built upon samples from "Love Is You", a disco song originally performed by Carol Williams with the Salsoul Orchestra. The origin of the song title is taken from the name of the nightclub 'Groovejet' in South Beach, Miami Beach, Florida, where the song was first played (as an instrumental) in 1999.

In order to make the track more palatable for airplay, as the instrumental is somewhat repetitive, Positiva Records asked the English singer Sophie Ellis-Bextor, formerly with indie rock band Theaudience, to provide lyrics and vocals for the song. Before recording, Ellis-Bextor's lyric was partly reworked by Rob Davis, who replaced her hook "And so it goes... how does it feel so good?" with "If this ain't love... why does it feel so good?", thereby providing the song with its subtitle. Boris Dlugosch produced the vocal portions added to the track. Sharon Scott is the backing vocalist.

The track has been remixed by Boris Dlugosch and Michi Lange, Todd Terry, Solar, Ramon "Ray Roc" Checo and Ernest St. Laurent. "Groovejet" was the first song ever to be played on an iPod, specifically on a prototype unit in August 2001. Upon its inclusion on Now That's What I Call Music! 46 in the UK, released a month before the single, the booklet write-up correctly predicted it to be a hit.

== Critical reception ==
"Groovejet (If This Ain't Love)" has received critical acclaim. Piers Martin of NME was favourable, saying "this is a slip of irresistible ice-filtered summer funk. This year's 'Sing It Back' and 'Music Sounds Better with You', if you will." Stylus Magazine's Dom Passantino rated the single 8/10, describing the song as "handbag house's last hurrah, except we'd stopped drinking Hooch by then and it was all about sambucca..."

Tom Ewing of Freaky Trigger rated the single 9 out of 10, saying: "There's a beautiful tension in 'Groovejet', an apt flirtation between Bextor's languid, cut-glass vocals and the delightful indulgence of Spiller's music. It's not just any disco he's reviving, after all. No Chic for Spiller, none of that poise or aspirational elegance. The sounds 'Groovejet' loots are the syn-drums and ray-gun synths of disco's overripe peak and decline, when it was corny, wonderful, mass-market pop music: you can hear hints of Kelly Marie or Amii Stewart in the song, before that sweetness falls back into the dreamy groove. 'Groovejet' is a fond tour of disco when it ruled the world, and proof that it still could." He described the music's sophistication as coming from Ellis-Bextor, who "offsets the track's bubbly repetition, adds a bittersweet note without ever sounding like she's above it. In fact she sounds carried along by it."

== Commercial performance ==
In the United Kingdom, the single was first released in the same week as "Out of Your Mind", Victoria Beckham's first single outside the Spice Girls. "Out of Your Mind" held the midweek number one in the UK singles chart until Saturday, when "Groovejet (If This Ain't Love)" overtook it in sales; it was hyped by the media as a personal battle between the two artists. The song was the eighth best-selling song of 2000 in the UK. A live version of the track appeared as a B-side to Ellis-Bextor's single "Music Gets the Best of Me", and in 2003, "Groovejet (If This Ain't Love)" was re-released as part of Positiva Records 'Remixed' series. In April 2015, the Official Charts Company announced that "Groovejet" was the biggest-selling vinyl single of the millennium in the UK.

The single also found success worldwide. It reached number one in Ireland (two weeks), Australia (three weeks), and New Zealand (seven weeks). In mainland Europe, it charted within the top five in Iceland, Norway, and Switzerland while becoming a top-ten hit in Denmark, Finland, Hungary, Italy, the Netherlands, and Portugal. On the European Hot 100 Singles, it peaked at number 12 on 21 October 2000. In the United States, "Groovejet" peaked at number 27 on the Billboard Maxi-Singles Sales chart and number three on the Billboard Dance Club Play chart. The track has earned a double-platinum certification in Australia, a platinum certification in the UK, and a gold certification in New Zealand.

== Music video ==
The accompanying music video for "Groovejet (If This Ain't Love)" shows Spiller and Ellis-Bextor making their way separately around Bangkok in Thailand. Spiller meets people and signs autographs, finding his height makes life there difficult; Ellis-Bextor sings wistfully at various tables in bars. Spiller takes a taxi while Ellis-Bextor takes an auto rickshaw, and eventually they meet at a nightclub.

== Legacy ==
In 2003, Q magazine ranked "Groovejet (If This Ain't Love)" number 782 in their list of the "1001 Best Songs Ever". In 2014, Pitchfork ranked it number 486 in their "Top 500 Tracks of the 2000s". In 2018, Mixmag included the song in their list of "The 30 Best Vocal House Anthems Ever". In 2025, Billboard ranked "Groovejet (If This Ain't Love)" number 75 in their list of "The 100 Best Dance Songs of All Time", writing, "Over loops of a chopped-up disco sample and airplane whoosh effects, Ellis-Bextor's voice cuts like glass, complementing a hypnotic rhythm that seems borne of the West Med. Why does it feel so good?, indeed."

== Track listings ==
- European CD single
1. "Groovejet (If This Ain't Love)" (radio edit) – 3:43
2. "Groovejet (If This Ain't Love)" (instrumental radio) – 3:30
3. "Groovejet (If This Ain't Love)" (BMR's club cut) – 6:57
4. "Groovejet (If This Ain't Love)" (Spiller's extended vocal mix) – 7:28
5. "Groovejet (If This Ain't Love)" (Todd Terry's In House remix) – 6:51
6. "Groove Jet" – 6:18
- UK CD single
1. "Groovejet (If This Ain't Love)" (radio edit) – 3:47
2. "Groovejet" – 6:18
3. "Groovejet" (Solar's Jet Groove dub mix) – 8:18
- UK 12-inch single

A1. "Groovejet (If This Ain't Love)" (Spiller's extended vocal mix) – 7:27
AA1. "Groovejet" – 6:18
AA2. "Groovejet" (Solar's Jet Groove dub mix) – 5:55

- German maxi-CD single
1. "Groovejet (If This Ain't Love) (radio edit) – 3:41
2. "Groovejet (If This Ain't Love) (original version) – 6:16
3. "Groovejet (If This Ain't Love) (BMR's club cut) – 6:57
4. "Groovejet (If This Ain't Love) (Spiller's extended vocal mix) – 7:26
5. "Groovejet (If This Ain't Love) (Todd Terry's In House remix) – 6:47
6. "Groovejet (If This Ain't Love) (Ray Roc's Trackworks Remix Part II) – 8:10

== Charts ==
=== Weekly charts ===
Chart (2000–2001)	Peak position
Australia (ARIA)	1
Australian Dance (ARIA)	1
Austria (Ö3 Austria Top 40)	16
Belgium (Ultratop 50 Flanders)	15
Belgium (Ultratop 50 Wallonia)	13
Denmark (IFPI)	9
Europe (Eurochart Hot 100)	12
Finland (Suomen virallinen lista)	6
France (SNEP)	17
Germany (GfK)	14
Hungary (Mahasz)	9
Iceland (Íslenski Listinn Topp 40)	4
Ireland (IRMA)	1
Ireland Dance (IRMA)	1
Italy (FIMI)	9
Netherlands (Dutch Top 40)	10
Netherlands (Single Top 100)	13
New Zealand (Recorded Music NZ)	1
Norway (VG-lista)	4
Poland (Polish Airplay Charts)	12
Portugal (AFP)	6
Scottish Singles Sales (Official Charts)	1
Sweden (Sverigetopplistan)	28
Switzerland (Schweizer Hitparade)	5
UK Singles (Official Charts)	1
UK Dance (Official Charts)	1
US Dance Club Play (Billboard)	3
US Maxi-Singles Sales (Billboard)	27

Chart (2021)	Peak position
Hungary (Single Top 40)	24

=== Year-end charts ===
Chart (2000)	Position
Australia (ARIA)	9
Belgium (Ultratop 50 Wallonia)	83
Europe (Eurochart Hot 100)	41
France (SNEP)	68
Iceland (Íslenski Listinn Topp 40)	64
Ireland (IRMA)	17
Netherlands (Dutch Top 40)	54
Netherlands (Single Top 100)	84
New Zealand (RIANZ)	20
Switzerland (Schweizer Hitparade)	45
UK Singles (OCC)	8

Chart (2001)	Position
Brazil (Crowley)	58

=== Decade-end charts ===
Chart (2000–2009)	Position
Australia (ARIA)	83

== Certifications ==
Region	Certification	Certified units/sales
Australia (ARIA)	2× Platinum	140,000^{^}
New Zealand (RMNZ)	Gold	15,000^{‡}
United Kingdom (BPI)	Platinum	642,000
^{^} Shipments figures based on certification alone.^{‡} Sales+streaming figures based on certification alone.

== Release history ==
Region	Date	Format(s)	Label(s)	Ref(s).
United Kingdom	14 August 2000	12-inch vinyl; CD; cassette	Positiva	
New Zealand	25 September 2000	CD; cassette	Positiva	
United States	8 May 2001	Rhythmic contemporary radio	Atlantic	
