= Spiller =

- Born: Cristiano Spiller; 3 April 1975 (age 51); Venice, Italy
- Genres: House; nu-disco
- Years active: 1997–present
- Labels: EMI; Positiva; Nano

Cristiano Spiller (born 3 April 1975) is an Italian electronic music DJ and record producer. He is best known for his 2000 single "Groovejet (If This Ain't Love)", featuring Sophie Ellis-Bextor. The song reached number-one in the UK, Australia, Ireland, and New Zealand. It sold over two million copies and was rumoured to be the first song to be played on an iPod.

== Biography ==
=== Early life and first releases ===
When he was a teenager, he was already introducing himself to the world of Italian house and dance music. In 1997, he released his first single, "Laguna". Billed as Laguna, in 1997 Spiller teamed up with fellow Italian producer Tommy Vee, to release the single "Spiller From Rio (Do It Easy)", which reached number 40 in the UK Singles Chart. In 1998, he signed a music deal with the British record label, Positiva Records, a subsidiary of EMI UK, releasing his first solo single in the UK entitled "Batucada". In 1999, he released "Mighty Miami EP", a maxi-single including the instrumental track "Groovejet".

=== Mainstream popularity and "Groovejet" ===
In 2000, the vocal version of "Groovejet" was released. "Groovejet (If This Ain't Love)" featuring the British singer Sophie Ellis-Bextor (formerly of theaudience) peaked at #1 in the UK, Australia and many other countries, becoming one of the most successful dance records of the year and winning multiple awards. It was also the first song to be played on an iPod according to technology journalist Steven Levy and the BBC's TOTP2 Goes Disco!. Groovejet sold over 2,000,000 copies worldwide.

=== Later releases ===
In 2002, he released "Cry Baby" in the UK. In 2003, Spiller decided to take control over his own productions and thus established his own independent label Nano Records, based in Venice, Italy. In 2004 a single titled "Sola" was released by Positiva. In the UK the single was supported by Pete Tong on BBC Radio 1. In 2006, he released "Jumbo". His 2011 single "Pigeonman's Revenge" is an instrumental house track with a music video formed by Starlings directed by photographer James Mollison. In 2013, Spiller released "Urastar" featuring Nina Miranda (former singer of Smoke City).

== Discography ==
=== Extended plays ===
- Laguna Vol. 1 EP (1997)
- Mighty Miami EP (1999)

=== Singles ===
List of singles, with selected chart positions and certifications, showing year released and album name
Title	Year	Peak chart positions										Certifications	Album
Title	Year	ITA	AUS	FRA	GER	IRE	NL	NOR	NZ	SWI	UK	Certifications	Album
"Spiller from Rio (Do It Easy)"	1997	—	—	—	—	—	—	—	—	—	40		Laguna Vol. 1
"Batucada"	1998	—	—	—	—	—	—	—	—	—	—		Non-album single
"Groovejet (If This Ain't Love)" (featuring Sophie Ellis-Bextor)	2000	9	1	17	14	1	13	4	1	5	1	ARIA: 2× Platinum; BPI: Platinum; RIANZ: Platinum	Read My Lips
"Cry Baby"	2002	—	78	—	—	40	—	—	—	—	40		Non-album singles
"Sola"	2004	—	—	—	—	—	—	—	—	—	—		Non-album singles
"Jumbo"	2006	—	—	—	—	—	—	—	—	—	—		Non-album singles
"Pigeonman's Revenge"	2011	—	—	—	—	—	—	—	—	—	—		Non-album singles
"Urastar" (featuring Nina Miranda)	2013	—	—	—	—	—	—	—	—	—	—		Non-album singles
"—" denotes a recording that did not chart or was not released in that territory.
