= A Pessimist Is Never Disappointed =

Single by Theaudience

from the album Theaudience
- Released: 11 May 1998
- Recorded: 1997–1998
- Genre: Rock
- Length: 3:46
- Label: eLLeFFe
- Songwriter(s): Billy Reeves
- Producer(s): Mike Hedges

Theaudience singles chronology
"If You Can't Do It When You're Young; When Can You Do It?" (1998)	"A Pessimist Is Never Disappointed" (1998)	"I Know Enough (I Don't Get Enough)" (1998)

Alternative cover
- CD2 Cover

"A Pessimist Is Never Disappointed" is an indie-rock song written by Billy Reeves for Theaudience's eponymous album Theaudience, released as the third single on 11 May 1998. "A Pessimist Is Never Disappointed" became one of the band's most popular songs, peaking at #27 on the UK Singles Chart. The B-sides for the single include a French language acoustic version of "A Pessimist Is Never Disappointed"; a short previously unreleased keyboard instrumental, "I Miss Leo"; a cover of the Supermodel song "Penis Size and Cars"; three unreleased demos from the group's Blah St. recording sessions, and an extended version of "Bells for David Keenan" from the group's debut album. For radio play, the line "and we all sing the same fucking song" was replaced with "and we all sing the same stupid song".

The song was performed by lead vocalist Sophie Ellis-Bextor on her 2002 Read My Lips solo tour, and the video was included on her subsequent DVD release, Watch My Lips. It was also re-recorded with an orchestral arrangement for her greatest hits compilation The Song Diaries (2019).

== Track listing ==
UK CD single #1 (AUDCD3)

1. "A Pessimist Is Never Disappointed" – 3:46
2. "Penis Size and Cars" – 2:58
3. "Ne Jamais Deçu" – 3:37
4. "I Miss Leo" – 1:44

UK CD single #2 (AUDDD3)

1. "A Pessimist Is Never Disappointed" – 3:46
2. "Ten Minutes Which Improved My Life" – 9:26
3. "Never Gonna Give It to You" – 3:19
4. "I'm Always Ready" – 4:11

UK Limited Edition Vinyl (AUDVN3)

1. "A Pessimist Is Never Disappointed" – 3:46
2. "Penis Size and Cars" – 2:58
3. "Bells for David Keenan" (Extended Mix) – 2:22
