= Get Over You / Move This Mountain =

2002 single by Sophie Ellis-Bextor

"Get Over You" / "Move This Mountain"
- UK CD1 cover

Single by Sophie Ellis-Bextor

from the album Read My Lips
- B-side: "Live It Up" (acoustic)
- Released: 10 June 2002
- Studio: Mayfair (London, England) ("MTM")
- Length: 3:14 ("GOY"); 4:45 ("MTM")
- Label: Polydor
- Songwriters: Sophie Ellis-Bextor, Rob Davies, Henrik Korpi, Mathias Johansson, Nina Woodford ("GOY"); Sophie Ellis-Bextor, Ben Hillier, Alex James ("MTM")
- Producers: Korpi & Blackcell ("GOY"); Ben Hillier, Alex James ("MTM")

Sophie Ellis-Bextor singles chronology
"Murder on the Dancefloor" (2001)	"Get Over You" / "Move This Mountain" (2002)	"Music Gets the Best of Me" (2002)

Music videos
- "Get Over You" on YouTube; "Move This Mountain" on YouTube

"Get Over You" and "Move This Mountain" are two songs by British pop singer Sophie Ellis-Bextor. In most countries, "Get Over You" received a solo release, but in the United Kingdom, the two tracks were issued as a double A-side single on 10 June 2002. The former track was taken off the Read My Lips album reissue, while the latter was an album track included on the original album release.

The double A-side was Ellis-Bextor's third top-three hit in the United Kingdom, peaking at number three on the UK Singles Chart. "Get Over You" by itself reached the top 10 in Denmark, Spain, Australia, and New Zealand. In the latter two countries, the song was certified platinum and gold, respectively. In Europe, the track peaked within the top 20 in Finland, the Netherlands, Norway, and Switzerland.

== Music video ==
=== "Get Over You" ===
The video for "Get Over You" is set in a shopping mall, after hours, on a rainy night. The camera passes by the closed, neon-lit stores, and locks onto the shopwindow of "Parisienne Bridalwear" where a designer is adjusting the garments of waxy-looking mannequins of bride and groom. The bride dummy, played by Sophie Ellis-Bextor, suddenly starts to blink and roll its eyes. The designer finally decides to move the groom, played by Swedish recording artist Jonas Myrin, away from Bextor and places it beside the other bride-doll. The Bextor-dummy starts to sing and performs clumsy movements of its various body parts, tilting and turning its head, trying axial hand-rotation, but all these remain unnoticed by the designer, who leaves the scene. Bextor's motion becomes gradually smoother, as the doll keeps singing and is getting more and more alive. She even drops her bouquet, and acquires a kind of power that makes her capable of breaking the store window without even touching it. Engulfed in a shower of exploding glass splinters, Bextor steps out of the window, removes her bridal costume, revealing a pink frock, and starts walking down the shopping lane. Other female mannequins in fashion shops come alive as she passes by and blasts the windows open. The liberated dolls all escape and follow Bextor in a robotic dance. The video finishes with Bextor waving to the camera with both hands and shattering the screen into fragments.

=== "Move This Mountain" ===
The music video for "Move This Mountain" is composed entirely of mirrored scenes, first in black and white, and then in color. It was directed by Sophie Muller. Both videos were included in Ellis-Bextor's video album, Watch My Lips.

== Track listings ==
UK CD1

1. "Get Over You"
2. "Move This Mountain"
3. "Live It Up" (acoustic version)
4. "Get Over You" (CD-ROM video)

UK CD2

1. "Get Over You"
2. "Get Over You" (Max Reich vocal mix)
3. "Move This Mountain" (CD-ROM video)

UK cassette single

1. "Get Over You"
2. "Move This Mountain"
3. "Everything Falls into Place" (Busface Remix)

European CD single

1. "Get Over You"
2. "Move This Mountain"

Australasian CD single

1. "Get Over You" (single mix)
2. "Move This Mountain" (radio edit)
3. "Live It Up" (acoustic version)
4. "Get Over You" (Max Reich vocal mix)
5. "Murder on the Dancefloor" (Jewels & Stone Mix edit)
6. "Get Over You" (video)
7. "Move This Mountain" (video)

== Credits and personnel ==
Credits are lifted from the Read My Lips album booklet.

=== "Get Over You" ===
Studios

- Produced and arranged at Murlyn Studios (Stockholm, Sweden)
- Mixed at Khabang Studio (Stockholm, Sweden)
- Mastered at Sony Music Studios (London, England)

Personnel

- Sophie Ellis-Bextor – writing
- Rob Davies – writing
- Korpi & Blackcell – production, recording, arrangement
  - Henrik Korpi – writing, keyboards, programming
  - Mathias Johansson – writing, guitar, bass, keyboards, programming
- Nina Woodford – writing, background vocals
- Emma Holmgren – background vocals
- Niklas Flyckt – mixing
- Göran Elmquist – mix assistant
- John Davis – mastering

=== "Move This Mountain" ===
Studios

- Recorded at Mayfair Studios (London, England)
- Mixed at Townhouse Studios (London, England)
- Mastered at Sony Music Studios (London, England)

Personnel

- Sophie Ellis-Bextor – writing
- Ben Hillier – writing, all instruments, piano, programming, production
- Alex James – writing, bass, production
- Darren Nash – recording assistant
- Jeremy Wheatley – mixing
- John Davis – mastering

== Charts ==
All entries charted as "Get Over You" except where noted.

=== Weekly charts ===
Chart (2002)	Peak position
Australia (ARIA)	4
Australian Dance (ARIA)	1
Austria (Ö3 Austria Top 40)	35
Belgium (Ultratip Bubbling Under Flanders)	3
Belgium (Ultratop 50 Wallonia)	36
Czech Republic (IFPI)	7
Denmark (Tracklisten)	5
Europe (Eurochart Hot 100) "Get Over You" / "Move This Mountain"	15
Finland (Suomen virallinen lista)	16
France (SNEP)	23
Germany (GfK)	28
Hungary (Rádiós Top 40)	12
Hungary (Single Top 40)	20
Ireland (IRMA)	11
Italy (FIMI)	21
Netherlands (Dutch Top 40)	4
Netherlands (Single Top 100)	13
New Zealand (Recorded Music NZ)	3
Norway (VG-lista)	15
Romania (Romanian Top 100)	7
Scottish Singles Sales (Official Charts) "Get Over You" / "Move This Mountain"	6
Spain (Promusicae)	8
Sweden (Sverigetopplistan)	27
Switzerland (Schweizer Hitparade)	15
UK Singles (Official Charts) "Get Over You" / "Move This Mountain"	3
UK Airplay (Music Week)	4

=== Year-end charts ===
Chart (2002)	Position
Australia (ARIA)	21
Australian Dance (ARIA)	5
Netherlands (Dutch Top 40)	42
New Zealand (RIANZ)	19
UK Singles (OCC)	89
UK Airplay (Music Week)	54

== Certifications ==
Region	Certification	Certified units/sales
Australia (ARIA)	Platinum	70,000^{^}
France	—	35,456
New Zealand (RMNZ)	Gold	5,000^{*}
^{*} Sales figures based on certification alone.^{^} Shipments figures based on certification alone.

== Release history ==
Region	Date	Format(s)	Label(s)	Ref.
United Kingdom	10 June 2002	CD	Polydor	
Australia	24 June 2002	CD	Polydor	
