= Billy Reeves =

British songwriter

Billy Reeves (born 7 June 1965) is an English songwriter, musician, record producer and broadcaster.

In 1996 he formed the London-based indie-band Theaudience, (featuring Sophie Ellis-Bextor on vocals). Theaudience quickly established themselves in the Camden scene of 1997. They scored two top 30 (UK) hits - "A Pessimist Is Never Disappointed" and "I Know Enough (I Don't Get Enough)" - and a top 20 (UK) eponymous album, before Reeves left the band following the 1998 Glastonbury festival.

Prior to theaudience, Reeves had briefly been drummer for the bands Blow Up and The Grooveyard, and later worked at the label of Spacemen 3 and Teenage Fanclub Fire Records in the early 1990s.

Reeves signed to Sony Records with a new act ('Yours') in 1999. He also ran the club ('Uncle Bob's Wedding Reception') which provided The Darkness with their first London show. Around this time he also had a brief stint in Los Angeles producing new artist demos for Rondor Publishing. His performing career was interrupted by injuries sustained in a near-fatal car accident in 2001, although he returned to live music from 2006 with the short-lived pop band Sugar Coat, who were awarded with a Guinness World Record following the release of the world's first playable jigsaw puzzle.

After recovering from his accident Reeves studied under the noted writer and journalist Chris Horrie at the University of Westminster. Reeves achieved a distinction in his post graduate degree under Horrie and was therefore able to reinvent himself as a radio producer and broadcaster on BBC Radio London. His travel and sports reports are distinctive due to an eccentric delivery, which his friend Danny Baker has compared to the late Cyril Fletcher.

He produced the 2005 Sony Award-winning Charlie Gillett Show (which featured Mavis Staples), and as part of the BBC London Travel Team has won two Frank Gillard Awards - in 2009 and 2011. The team was nominated for the 2011 Sony in the 'Multiplatform' category (for coverage of the Tube Strike) and commended in the 2011 Online Media Awards in the 'Twitter feed of the year' category. Outside of the BBC he presents a monthly podcast for Kscope Records, the forefront of the uniquely British 'post-progressive' rock scene.

Reeves has also turned his hand to football commentary for BBC Radio. He lends an eloquence to reports from Brentford FC as well as writing a column in the match-day programme.

Last Night From Glasgow have released 3 Reeves solo albums, all have which have charted in the top ten of the Scottish album charts.
