= Robin Bextor =

English film and television director and producer

- Born: Robin J. Bextor; 11 October 1953 (age 72); Hammersmith, England
- Education: University of Reading
- Occupations: Film director; producer; author
- Spouses: Janet Ellis (m. 1977; div. 1984): Polly Mockford
- Children: Sophie Ellis-Bextor, among others

Robin J. Bextor (born 11 October 1953) is an English film and television producer and director. He is the father of the dance-pop singer Sophie Ellis-Bextor.

== Early life and education ==
After his education at Shene Grammar School in Richmond, and at the University of Reading, Bextor worked at the Dimbleby-owned Richmond and Twickenham Times before joining Thames Television and then the BBC, where he produced and directed documentaries, including an RTS award-winning film on blind parents and entertainment programmes including That's Life!. During this time, he also made pop promotion videos for such bands as Bad Manners, Bow Wow Wow, Adam Ant and Bucks Fizz.

== Career ==
Bextor directed Edward on Edward, a documentary in which Prince Edward, Duke of Edinburgh discussed King Edward VIII. Bextor then worked as director of programmes for Ardent, but left to pursue other projects.

Bextor has since made programmes with the French duo Air; The Damned; The Stranglers; and UB40. He directed the cult short film Norfolk Coast, featuring Susannah York and Jean Jacques Burnel. He is a majority shareholder of the Soho post production business Vivid, responsible for programmes on the England football team, Test cricket and Fulham FC, as well as many arts subjects.

He has won the Columbus ("Chris") award for The British Schindler, shown on ITV in 2005, and a BAFTA.

Bextor also directed his daughter's DVD Watch My Lips. He has been director of the Chichester Festival for five years and a trustee of the Brighton theatre company Dream, Think, Speak.

Bextor has also had a successful career as a writer, writing for newspapers and magazines and the book to accompany the TV series Crown and Country. The relationships built working with Paul McCartney and Eric Clapton over many years led to the publication of Paul McCartney Now & Then in 2004, and Eric Clapton Now & Then in 2006. Bextor is also a director of Glyndebourne Productions in East Sussex.

In 2013, he directed a six-part TV series on London, with specials on the London Underground, Windsor Castle and Buckingham Palace. He also wrote The Story of the London Underground, published that same year. The following year, he produced and directed Glyndebourne: the Untold History for the BBC. He also wrote and directed a four-part music series, The Sound of the 60s, and a book of the series, published the same year. A second series, The Sound of the 70s, followed, as well as the series Historic Hauntings. He has made films on 10cc (Clever Clogs), Squeeze, Cara Dillon, the French band Air, and The Feeling, with Kiefer Sutherland. Bextor was one of the founders, alongside his daughter Sophie and son-in-law Richard Jones, of the Meribel Music Festival in the French Alps, called The Little World Festival.

== Political activity ==
In the 2019 European Parliament Election in May 2019, Bextor stood as a candidate for Change UK in the South East England constituency of the United Kingdom. The party received 105,832 votes (4.2%), finishing in sixth place of twelve candidates.
