= Music Gets the Best of Me =

2002 single by Sophie Ellis-Bextor

Single by Sophie Ellis-Bextor

from the album Read My Lips
- B-side: "Is It Any Wonder"; "Everything Falls into Busface"
- Released: 4 November 2002
- Studio: Mayfair (London, England)
- Length: 3:45
- Label: Polydor
- Songwriters: Sophie Ellis-Bextor; Matt Rowe; Gregg Alexander
- Producers: Matt Rowe; Gregg Alexander; Steve Osborne

Sophie Ellis-Bextor singles chronology
"Get Over You" / "Move This Mountain" (2002)	"Music Gets the Best of Me" (2002)	"Mixed Up World" (2003)

Music video
- "Music Gets the Best of Me" on YouTube

"Music Gets the Best of Me" is a song by the British singer Sophie Ellis-Bextor, released as the fourth and final single from her debut solo album, Read My Lips (2001). Written by Ellis-Bextor, Gregg Alexander and Matt Rowe, with Rowe and Alexander serving as producers alongside Steve Osborne, it was one of two new tracks that appeared on the re-issue of the album in 2002, along with previous single "Get Over You". Lyrically, "Music Gets the Best of Me" explores Ellis-Bextor's love of music, highlighting her commitment to music rather than a love life.

Following its release, the song peaked at number 14 on the UK Singles Chart, becoming Ellis-Bextor's first single to miss the top 10. Elsewhere, it peaked at number 15 in Italy and Romania. Prior to its release, the song received a radio edit for airplay, which reduced some of the backing vocals that were originally more prominent on the album version. Two music videos were made for the song: a "Day Version" and a "Night Version", with the night version of the music video being the one that was broadcast in the United Kingdom. The night version of the video attracted similarities for its production and style to that of "Groovejet (If This Ain't Love)". "Music Gets the Best of Me" is Ellis-Bextor's ninth-best–selling single in the UK as of 2024.

== Music video ==
There are two different music videos for the song. Both are directed by Sophie Muller. The first shows Ellis-Bextor in a tropical seaside setting, singing, playing, and dancing in daylight, both on the beach and in the water; at the end, she is at a night carnival. In much of the video, she wears headphones, as if listening to music. This video was the one released for television. The second video shows Ellis-Bextor going in to a dinner party uninvited; she puts on a CD and begins to perform, going from room to room; and ends by claiming that she had fun and leaving. This version was featured as an extra on her home video Watch My Lips.

== Track listings ==
UK CD1

1. "Music Gets the Best of Me" (single version)
2. "Music Gets the Best of Me" (Flip N Fill remix)
3. "Is It Any Wonder" (Jay's Bluesix radio edit)

UK CD2

1. "Music Gets the Best of Me" (single version)
2. "Groovejet (If This Ain't Love)" (live mix)
3. "Everything Falls into Busface"

UK cassette single

1. "Music Gets the Best of Me" (single version)
2. "Groovejet (If This Ain't Love)" (live mix)

European CD single

1. "Music Gets the Best of Me" (single version)
2. "Music Gets the Best of Me" (Flip N Fill remix)

Australian CD single

1. "Music Gets the Best of Me" (single version)
2. "Music Gets the Best of Me" (Flip N Fill remix)
3. "Get Over You" (Almighty Pop'd Up mix)
4. "Murder on the Dancefloor" (Twin Murder club mix)
5. "Is It Any Wonder" (Jay's Bluesix radio edit)
6. "Everything Falls into Busface"

== Credits and personnel ==
Credits are lifted from the Read My Lips album booklet.

Studios

- Recorded at Mayfair Studios (London, England)
- Mastered at Sony Music Studios (London, England)

Personnel

- Sophie Ellis-Bextor – writing
- Matt Rowe – writing, production
- Gregg Alexander – writing, production
- Stefan Skarbek – programming
- Steve Osborne – production
- Jeremy Wheatley – additional production and mix
- Rik Simpson – engineering
- John Davis – mastering

== Charts ==
=== Weekly charts ===
Chart (2002–2003)	Peak position
Australia (ARIA)	28
Belgium (Ultratip Bubbling Under Flanders)	4
Belgium (Ultratip Bubbling Under Wallonia)	4
Europe (Eurochart Hot 100)	50
Hungary (Editors' Choice Top 40)	20
Ireland (IRMA)	25
Italy (FIMI)	15
Netherlands (Dutch Top 40 Tipparade)	6
Netherlands (Single Top 100)	76
New Zealand (Recorded Music NZ)	25
Poland (PiF PaF)	7
Romania (Romanian Top 100)	15
Scottish Singles Sales (Official Charts)	15
Switzerland (Schweizer Hitparade)	53
UK Singles (Official Charts)	14

=== Year-end charts ===
Chart (2003)	Position
Romania (Romanian Top 100)	61

== Release history ==
Region	Date	Format(s)	Label(s)	Ref.
United Kingdom	4 November 2002	CD; cassette	Polydor	
Australia	11 November 2002	CD	Polydor	
New Zealand	9 December 2002	CD	Polydor	
