= Theaudience =

English rock band

- Origin: London, England
- Genres: Britpop; indie rock; alternative rock
- Years active: 1996–1999
- Labels: eLLeFFe; Mercury
- Past members: Sophie Ellis-Bextor; Billy Reeves; Kerin Smith; Nigel Butler; Patrick Hannan; Dean Mollett

Theaudience (styled as theaudience) were an English rock band, formed in London in 1996. They released one album and saw three singles enter the UK Singles Chart. The band's lead vocalist Sophie Ellis-Bextor became a successful solo artist after the band's disbandment.

== History ==
theaudience were founded by guitarist Billy Reeves, formerly of the indie group Congregation. The group was fronted by Sophie Ellis-Bextor and included drummer/producer "Patch" Hannan (ex-The Sundays), keyboard player Nigel Butler (ex-The Bridge), guitarist Dean Mollett (ex-Porcupine) and bass guitarist Kerin Smith. Their one, self-titled album received critical acclaim and reached No. 22 in the UK Albums Chart, with two of four singles released reaching the Top 40 in the UK Singles Chart.

Reeves left the band in December 1998, and although the remaining band members wrote and demoed at least 33 songs for a second album, it was rejected by record label Mercury Records, who then dropped the band, which split in 1999. Approximately half of these tracks were leaked onto the internet, and most of those appeared as a fan-made 14-track bootleg album in 2009 under the title Quiet Storm.

Ellis-Bextor started a solo career in major label artist-driven dance-pop music following the success of her collaboration with Spiller on "Groovejet (If This Ain't Love)" in 2000.

== Discography ==
theaudience discography
- Studio albums: 1
- Singles: 4
- Music videos: 4

The discography of theaudience consists of one studio album, four singles and four music videos. The album track Keep In Touch was earmarked as a potential fifth single.

33 songs were recorded as full band demos in 1998-1999 for a second album. Just over half of these circulate as bootleg/download tracks. One such track, Out With The Old School, was released contemporarily on NME sampler cassette "Wicked Women" in late 1998.

=== Studio albums ===
Title	Album details	Peak chart positions
Title	Album details	UK
Theaudience	Released: 17 August 1998; Formats: CD, CS, LP; Label: Mercury	22

=== Singles ===
Title	Year	Peak chart positions	Album
Title	Year	UK	Album
"I Got the Wherewithal"	1997	170	theaudience
"If You Can't Do It When You're Young; When Can You Do It?"	1998	48	theaudience
"A Pessimist Is Never Disappointed"	1998	27	theaudience
"I Know Enough (I Don't Get Enough)"	1998	25	theaudience
