= Sophie Ellis-Bextor discography =

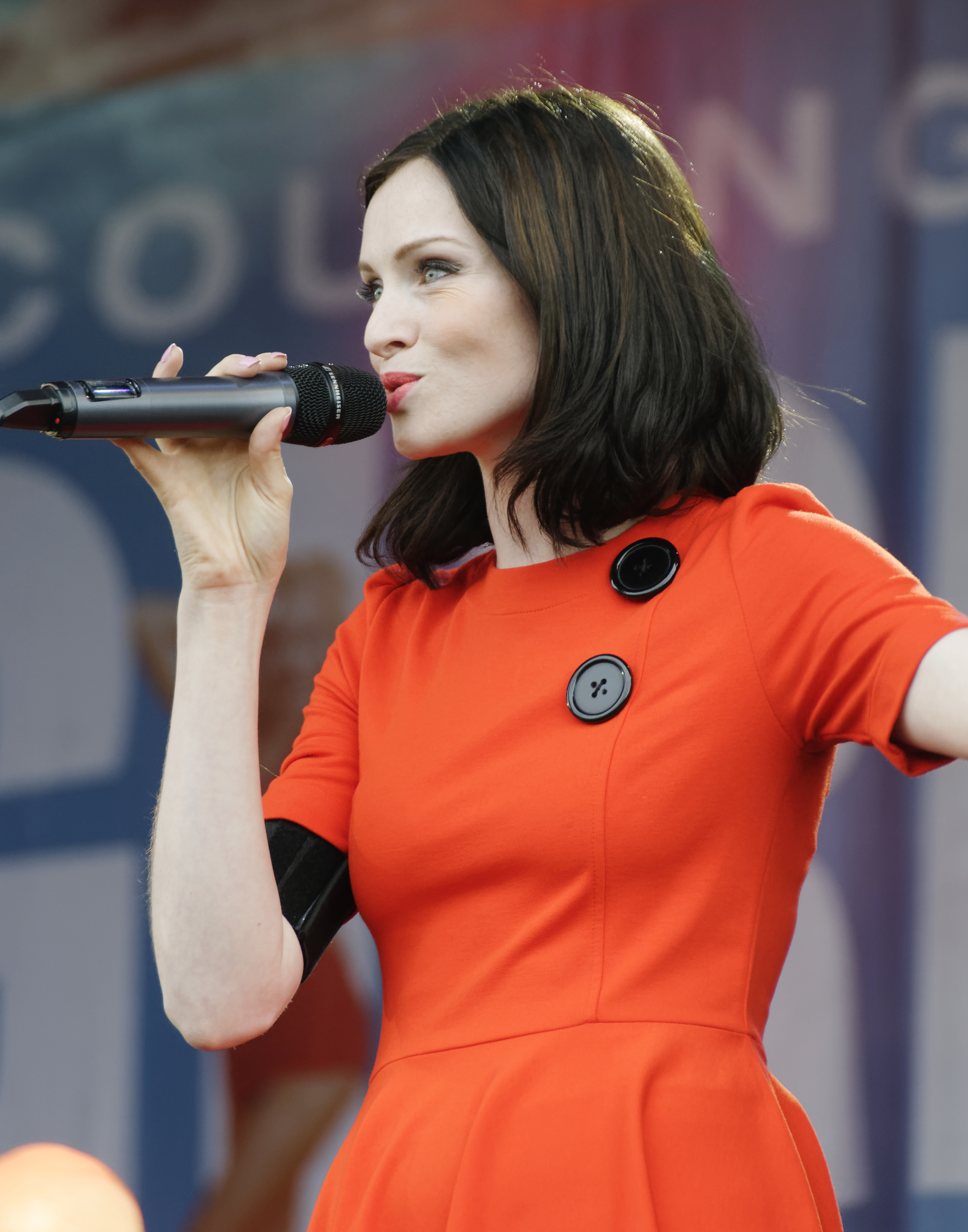
- Ellis-Bextor performing in 2011
- Studio albums: 8
- Extended plays: 1
- Live albums: 1
- Compilation albums: 3
- Singles: 38
- Video albums: 1
- Music videos: 27
- Remix albums: 1

British singer Sophie Ellis-Bextor has released seven solo studio albums, one live album, two compilation albums, one remix album, one extended play, one video album, thirty-eight singles (including eight as a featured performer) and twenty-seven music videos. Ellis-Bextor debuted in 1997 as frontwoman of the indie music group theaudience, whose single "I Know Enough (I Don't Get Enough)" reached the top 25 on the United Kingdom singles chart. They released a self-titled album. A follow-up was shelved by label Mercury Records, but selected tracks circulate as bootlegs.

Her debut solo album, Read My Lips, was released in September 2001. It reached number two on the UK Albums Chart and was certified double platinum by the British Phonographic Industry (BPI). The record sold over 1.5 million copies worldwide. It produced four singles, three of which reached the top three in the UK. Ellis-Bextor's second album, Shoot from the Hip, was released in October 2003. The album reached number 19 in the UK and produced two top-ten singles. Trip the Light Fantastic, her third album, was released in May 2007, reaching number seven in the UK. The album produced three singles, one of which reached the top ten in the UK.

In 2009, Ellis-Bextor collaborated with dance music group Freemasons on the single "Heartbreak (Make Me a Dancer)", which reached the top 20 in the UK. Her fourth studio album, Make a Scene, was released in 2011, peaking at number 33 on the UK Albums Chart.

For her fifth studio album, Wanderlust, Ellis-Bextor moved to a different style. Filled with ballads and folk songs, it was released on 20 January 2014 and debuted at number four in the UK and at number one on the UK Indie Albums chart. The lead single, "Young Blood", also made the Top 40 on the Official Singles Chart and top five on the Indie Chart.

== Albums ==
=== Studio albums ===
List of studio albums, with selected chart positions and certifications
Title	Album details	Peak chart positions										Certifications
Title	Album details	UK	AUS	AUT	FRA	GER	IRL	NLD	NOR	NZ	SWI	Certifications
Read My Lips	Released: 3 September 2001 (UK); Label: Polydor; Formats: CD, digital download, cassette	2	9	18	33	10	13	10	7	9	26	BPI: 2× Platinum; ARIA: Platinum; RMNZ: Platinum; SNEP: Gold
Shoot from the Hip	Released: 27 October 2003 (UK); Label: Polydor; Formats: CD, digital download, cassette	19	107	—	99	84	—	—	—	39	35	BPI: Silver
Trip the Light Fantastic	Released: 21 May 2007 (UK); Label: Fascination; Formats: CD, digital download, cassette	7	108	—	81	87	93	—	—	—	28	
Make a Scene	Released: 18 April 2011 (RUS); Label: EBGB's, Universal; Formats: CD, digital download	33	—	—	—	—	—	—	—	—	—	
Wanderlust	Released: 20 January 2014; Label: EBGB's; Formats: CD, LP, digital download	4	—	—	—	—	—	—	—	—	—	BPI: Silver
Familia	Released: 2 September 2016; Label: EBGB's; Formats: CD, LP, digital download	12	—	—	—	—	—	—	—	—	—	
Hana	Released: 2 June 2023; Label: Cooking Vinyl; Formats: CD, LP, cassette, digital download	8	—	—	—	—	—	—	—	—	—	
Perimenopop	Released: 12 September 2025; Label: Decca; Formats: CD, LP, cassette, digital download	5	—	—	185	62	—	—	—	—	51	
"—" denotes a recording that did not chart or was not released in that territory.

=== Live albums ===
List of live albums
Title	Album details
Kitchen Disco – Live at the London Palladium	Released: 25 November 2022; Label: EBGB's, Cooking Vinyl; Formats: 2×CD, digital download, 2×LP

=== Remix albums ===
List of remix albums
Title	Album details
Wandermix	Released: 3 November 2014; Label: EBGB's; Formats: Digital download, LP
Remixes	Released: 20 April 2024; Label: UMR; Formats: 2×LP (Record Store Day Exclusive)

=== Compilation albums ===
List of compilation albums
Title	Details	Peak chart positions	
Title	Details	UK	AUS
The Song Diaries	Released: 15 March 2019; Label: EBGB's, Cooking Vinyl; Formats: CD, digital download, LP	14	—
Songs from the Kitchen Disco	Released: 13 November 2020; Label: EBGB's, Cooking Vinyl; Formats: CD, digital download, LP	8	51
Murder in the Night	Released: 29 October 2024; Label: UME – Global Clearing House; Formats: Digital download	—	—

== Extended plays ==
List of extended plays
Title	Details
iTunes Festival: London 2009	Released: 30 July 2009 (UK); Label: Fascination; Formats: Digital download

== Singles ==
=== As lead artist ===
List of singles as lead artist, with selected chart positions and certifications, showing year released and album name
Title	Year	Peak chart positions											Sales	Certifications	Album
Title	Year	UK	AUS	AUT	BEL	FRA	GER	IRL	NLD	NZ	SWI	US	Sales	Certifications	Album
"Groovejet (If This Ain't Love)" (with Spiller)	2000	1	1	16	13	17	14	1	13	1	5	—	UK: 836,050	BPI: Platinum; ARIA: 2× Platinum; RMNZ: Platinum	Non-album single
"Take Me Home"	2001	2	106	—	—	—	79	6	79	18	—	—	UK: 277,000	BPI: Silver	Read My Lips
"Murder on the Dancefloor"	2001	2	3	8	7	5	11	2	7	2	7	—	UK: 2,054,450	BPI: 4× Platinum; ARIA: 6× Platinum; BRMA: Gold; SNEP: Gold; RIAA: Gold	Read My Lips
"Get Over You" / "Move This Mountain"	2002	3	4	35	36	23	28	11	13	3	15	—		ARIA: Platinum; RMNZ: Gold	Read My Lips
"Music Gets the Best of Me"	2002	14	28	—	54	—	—	25	76	25	53	—			Read My Lips
"Mixed Up World"	2003	7	32	44	58	—	69	26	76	—	45	—			Shoot from the Hip
"I Won't Change You"	2003	9	—	—	53	—	80	40	—	—	—	—			Shoot from the Hip
"Catch You"	2007	8	44	—	57	—	—	29	84	—	92	—			Trip the Light Fantastic
"Me and My Imagination"	2007	23	—	—	59	—	—	—	—	—	—	—			Trip the Light Fantastic
"Today the Sun's on Us"	2007	64	—	—	—	—	—	—	—	—	—	—			Trip the Light Fantastic
"Bittersweet"	2010	25	—	—	53	—	—	—	—	—	—	—			Make a Scene
"Off & On"	2011	—	—	—	—	—	—	—	—	—	—	—			Make a Scene
"Starlight"	2011	— (Note: "Starlight" did not enter the UK Singles Chart, but peaked at number 26 on the UK Independent Singles Chart.)	—	—	—	—	—	—	—	—	—	—			Make a Scene
"Young Blood"	2013	34	—	—	—	—	—	—	—	—	—	—			Wanderlust
"Runaway Daydreamer"	2014	— (Note: "Runaway Dreamer" did not enter the UK Singles Chart, but peaked at number 29 on the UK Independent Singles Chart.)	—	—	—	—	—	—	—	—	—	—			Wanderlust
"Love Is a Camera"	2014	— (Note: "Love Is a Camera" did not enter the UK Singles Chart, but peaked at number 32 on the UK Singles Downloads Chart.)	—	—	—	—	—	—	—	—	—	—			Wanderlust
"The Deer & the Wolf"	2014	—	—	—	—	—	—	—	—	—	—	—			Wanderlust
"Come with Us"	2016	—	—	—	—	—	—	—	—	—	—	—			Familia
"Crystallise"	2016	—	—	—	—	—	—	—	—	—	—	—			Familia
"Wild Forever"	2017	—	—	—	—	—	—	—	—	—	—	—			Familia
"Death of Love"	2017	—	—	—	—	—	—	—	—	—	—	—			Familia
"Love Is You"	2018	— (Note: "Love Is You" did not enter the UK Singles Chart, but peaked at number 91 on the UK Singles Downloads Chart.)	—	—	—	—	—	—	—	—	—	—			The Song Diaries
"Crying at the Discotheque"	2020	— (Note: "Crying at the Discotheque" did not enter the UK Singles Chart, but peaked at number 13 on the UK Singles Downloads Chart.)	—	—	—	—	—	—	—	—	—	—			Songs from the Kitchen Disco
"Hypnotized" (with Wuh Oh)	2022	—	—	—	—	—	—	—	—	—	—	—			Hana (Deluxe)
"Breaking the Circle"	2023	— (Note: "Breaking the Circle" did not enter the UK Singles Chart, but peaked at number 85 on the UK Singles Downloads Chart.)	—	—	—	—	—	—	—	—	—	—			Hana
"Everything Is Sweet"	2023	—	—	—	—	—	—	—	—	—	—	—			Hana
"Lost in the Sunshine"	2023	—	—	—	—	—	—	—	—	—	—	—			Hana
"Immortal" (with Lufthaus)	2023	—	—	—	—	—	—	—	—	—	—	—			Visions, Vol. 1
"Murder on the Dancefloor" (2024 re-release)	2024	2	7	8	38	29	19	2	7	7	12	51			Read My Lips
"Freedom of the Night"	2024	— (Note: "Freedom of the Night" did not enter the UK Singles Chart, but debuted and peaked at number 5 on the UK Singles Downloads Chart.)	—	—	—	—	—	—	—	—	—	—			Perimenopop
"Relentless Love"	2025	— (Note: "Relentless Love" did not enter the UK Singles Chart, but debuted at number 42 on the UK Singles Downloads Chart, and at number 47 on the UK Singles Sales Chart.)	—	—	—	—	—	—	—	—	—	—			Perimenopop
"Vertigo"	2025	— (Note: "Vertigo" did not enter the UK Singles Chart, but debuted at number 81 on the UK Singles Downloads Chart, and at number 84 on the UK Singles Sales Chart.)	—	—	—	—	—	—	—	—	—	—			Perimenopop
"Taste"	2025	— (Note: "Taste" did not enter the UK Singles Chart, but debuted at number 80 on the UK Singles Downloads Chart, and at number 82 on the UK Singles Sales Chart.)	—	—	—	—	—	—	—	—	—	—			Perimenopop
"Dolce Vita"	2025	—	—	—	—	—	—	—	—	—	—	—			Perimenopop
"Stay on Me"	2025	—	—	—	—	—	—	—	—	—	—	—			Perimenopop
"Dancing Without You" (with Disco Bambino and Nile Rodgers)	2026	— (Note: "Dancing Without You" did not enter the UK Singles Chart, but debuted and peaked at number 81 on the UK Singles Sales Chart.)	—	—	—	—	—	—	—	—	—	—			Non-album single
"—" denotes a recording that did not chart or was not released in that territory.

=== As featured artist ===
List of singles as featured artist, with selected chart positions, showing year released and album name
Title	Year	Peak chart positions									Album
Title	Year	UK	AUS	BEL (FL)	FRA	IRL	NLD	POL Air.	RUS	SCO	Album
"Circles (Just My Good Time)" (Busface featuring Mademoiselle E.B.)	2005	96	63	—	—	—	—	—	104	—	Devils, Sharks & Spaceships
"Heartbreak (Make Me a Dancer)" (Freemasons featuring Sophie Ellis-Bextor)	2009	13	51	33	—	38	85	—	2	5	Shakedown 2 and Make a Scene
"Can't Fight This Feeling" (Junior Caldera featuring Sophie Ellis-Bextor)	2010	—	—	—	13	—	—	1	1	—	Début and Make a Scene
"Not Giving Up on Love" (Armin van Buuren vs. Sophie Ellis-Bextor)	2010	165	—	26	—	—	8	1	3	—	Mirage and Make a Scene
"Leave Me Out of It" (The Feeling featuring Sophie Ellis-Bextor)	2011	—	—	—	—	—	—	—	—	—	Together We Were Made
"Fuck with You" (Bob Sinclar featuring Sophie Ellis-Bextor and Gilbere Forte)	2011	—	—	35	144	—	—	—	76	—	Disco Crash
"Beautiful" (Mathieu Bouthier featuring Sophie Ellis-Bextor)	2012	—	—	—	—	—	—	—	—	—	Non-album single
"Back 2 Paradise" (Guéna LG & Amir Arfagan featuring Sophie Ellis-Bextor)	2014	—	—	—	—	—	—	—	—	—	Momentum
"Only Child" (DedRekoning featuring Sophie Ellis-Bextor)	2014	—	—	—	—	—	—	—	—	—	Non-album single
"Hummingbird" (LCAW featuring Sophie Ellis-Bextor)	2018	—	—	—	—	—	—	—	—	—	Meet in the Middle EP
"Don't Stop" (The Feeling featuring Sophie Ellis-Bextor, Jamie Cullum & Original West End Cast of Everybody's Talking About Jamie)	2021	—	—	—	—	—	—	—	—	—	Non-album single
"Shining Star" (Betty Boo featuring Sophie Ellis-Bextor)	2022	—	—	—	—	—	—	—	—	—	Boomerang
"Deep in Vogue" (Rhyme So featuring Sophie Ellis-Bextor)	2023	—	—	—	—	—	—	—	—	*	Non-album singles
"Ready for Your Love" (Felix Jaehn featuring Sophie Ellis-Bextor)	2024	— (Note: "Ready for Your Love" did not enter the UK Singles Chart, but peaked at number 98 on the UK Singles Downloads Chart.)	—	—	—	—	—	1	6	*	NAGTTB+
"—" denotes a recording that did not chart or was not released in that territory. "*" denotes the chart did not exist at that time.

=== Promotional singles ===
List of promotional singles, showing year released and album name
Title	Year	Album
"If I Can't Dance"	2008	Trip the Light Fantastic
"While You're Still Young" (with The Feeling)	2022	Everybody's Talking About Jamie
"(Christmas) Time"	2025	Perimenopop (reissue)

== Other appearances ==
List of non-single appearances, showing year released and album name
Title	Year	Album / Release
"Black Holes for the Young" (Manic Street Preachers featuring Sophie Ellis-Bextor)	1998	"The Everlasting" single
"Johnny A (Remix)" (Departure Lounge featuring Sophie Ellis-Bextor)	2000	Out of There
"One Way or Another"	2002	The Guru soundtrack
"Want You More"	2004	Suzie Gold soundtrack
"Dear Jimmy"	2006	Popjustice: 100% Solid Pop Music
"Jolene"	2008	Beautiful People soundtrack
"Rebellion (Lies)"	2011	Songs to Save a Life: In Aid of Samaritans
"Save Myself" (Brian Cross featuring Sophie Ellis-Bextor)	2013	Pop Star: The Album
"True Faith"	2014	BBC Radio 2: Sounds of the '80s – Unique Covers of Classic Hits
"Self Control" (Alex Christensen and the Berlin Orchestra featuring Sophie Ellis-Bextor)	2022	Classical 80s Dance
"Sweet Dreams (Are Made of This)" (Alex Christensen and the Berlin Orchestra featuring Sophie Ellis-Bextor)	2022	Classical 80s Dance
"Punch Drunk" (Peter Jöback featuring Sophie Ellis-Bextor)	2024	Atlas

== Video albums ==
Title	Album details
Watch My Lips	Released: 1 December 2003 (UK); Label: Universal; Format: DVD

== Music videos ==
=== As lead artist ===
List of music videos as lead artist, with directors, showing year released
Title	Year	Director(s)
"Take Me Home"	2001	Sophie Muller
"Murder on the Dancefloor"	2001	Sophie Muller
"Move This Mountain"	2002	Sophie Muller
"Get Over You"	2002	Max & Dania (as "MAD")
"Music Gets the Best of Me" (version 1)	2002	Sophie Muller
"Music Gets the Best of Me" (version 2)	2002	Sophie Muller
"Mixed Up World"	2003	Rupert Jones
"I Won't Change You"	2003	Trudy Bellinger
"Catch You"	2007	Sophie Muller
"Me and My Imagination"	2007	Nima Nourizadeh
"Today the Sun's on Us"	2007	Sophie Muller
"Bittersweet"	2010	Chris Sweeney
"Starlight"	2011	Robin Bextor
"Young Blood"	2013	Sophie Muller
"Runaway Daydreamer"	2014	Sophie Muller
"Love Is a Camera"	2014	Sophie Muller
"The Deer & the Wolf"	2014	Harry Cauty
"Come with Us"	2016	Sophie Muller
"Crystallise"	2016	Sophie Muller
"Wild Forever"	2017	Sophie Muller
"Death of Love"	2017	Sophie Muller
"Crying at the Discotheque"	2020	Sophie Muller
"Hypnotized"	2022	Sophie Muller
"Breaking the Circle"	2023	Remi Laudat
"Lost in the Sunshine"	2023	Sophie Muller
"Freedom of the Night"	2024	Sophie Muller & Theo Adams
"Stay on Me"	2025	Sophie Muller

=== As featured artist ===
List of music videos as featured artist, with directors, showing year released
Title	Year	Director(s)
"Groovejet (If This Ain't Love)" (Spiller featuring Sophie Ellis-Bextor)	2000	Frank Nesemann
"Heartbreak (Make Me a Dancer)" (Freemasons featuring Sophie Ellis-Bextor)	2009	Chris Sweeney
"Can't Fight This Feeling" (Junior Caldera featuring Sophie Ellis-Bextor)	2010	Jelle Posthuma
"Not Giving Up on Love" (Armin van Buuren vs. Sophie Ellis-Bextor)	2010	Sophie Muller
"Beautiful" (Mathieu Bouthier featuring Sophie Ellis-Bextor)	2012	Unknown
"Back 2 Paradise" (Guena LG & Amir Afargan featuring Sophie Ellis-Bextor)	2014	Svenno Koemans
"Hummingbird" (LCAW featuring Sophie Ellis-Bextor)	2018	Tomek Ducki
"Don't Stop" (The Feeling featuring Sophie Ellis-Bextor and Jamie Cullum)	2021	Not credited
"When You're Still Young" (The Feeling featuring Sophie Ellis-Bextor)	2022	Jordan Rossi
"Deep in Vogue" (Rhyme So featuring Sophie Ellis-Bextor)	2023	Or Hhaim
"Ready for Your Love" (Felix Jaehn featuring Sophie Ellis-Bextor)	2024	Julian Kleinert & Amelie Siegmund

== See also ==
- List of songs recorded by Sophie Ellis-Bextor
