= List of songs recorded by Sophie Ellis-Bextor =

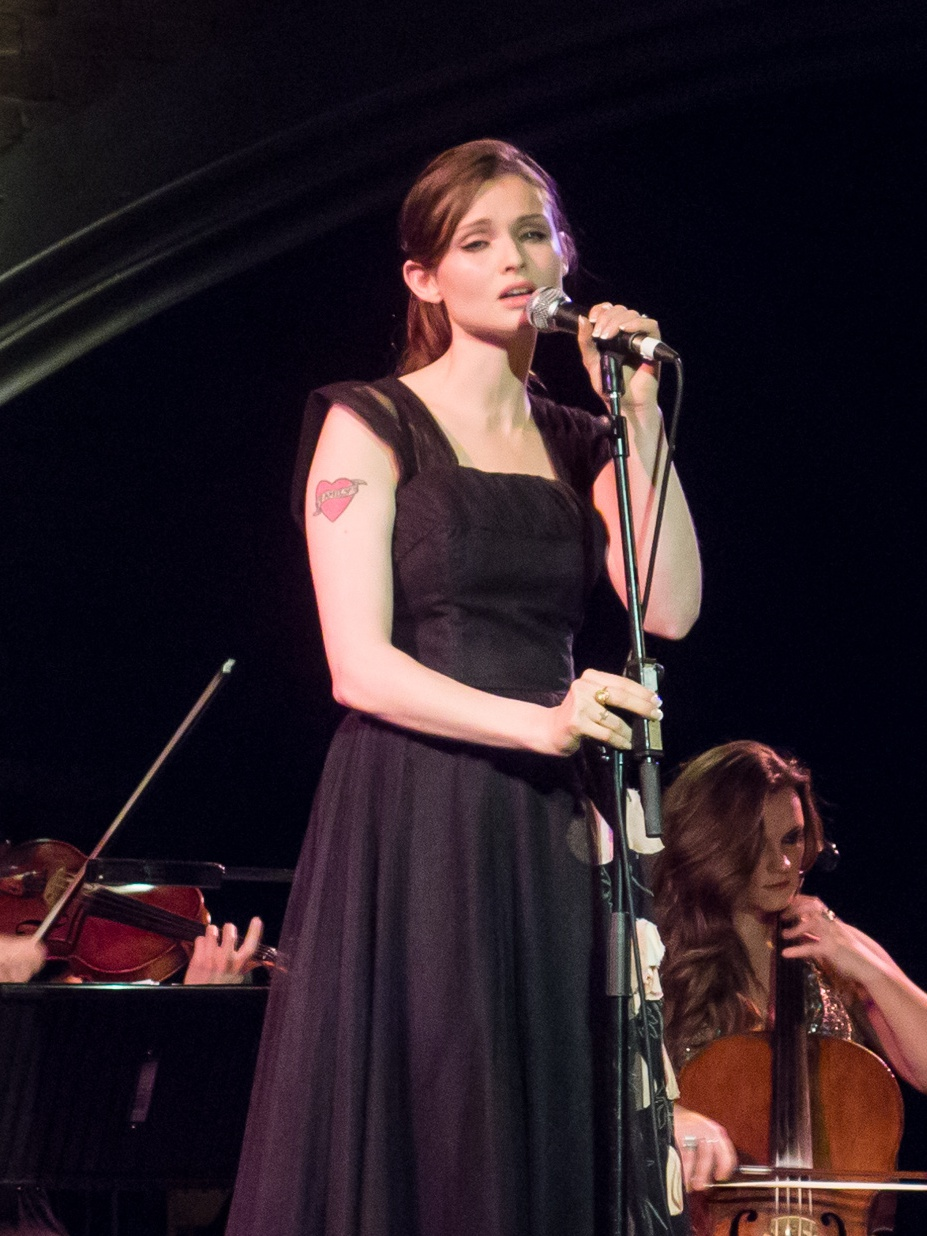
Ellis-Bextor performing at the Union Chapel

British singer Sophie Ellis-Bextor has recorded songs for five studio albums and other projects, including collaborations with other artists. She began her musical career as the main vocalist of the indie rock band Theaudience, whose single "I Know Enough (I Don't Get Enough)" reached the top 25 on the UK Singles Chart. Despite its commercial success, after three years, they were dropped from Mercury Records and split. Following the disbandment of the group, Ellis-Bextor provided vocals for the DJ Spiller's single "Groovejet (If This Ain't Love)", which topped the UK Singles Chart. She then started writing and recording for a debut album.

After releasing her debut single "Take Me Home", Polydor Records issued her first studio album Read My Lips on 27 August 2001 which primarily tended towards a disco and electronica-inspired sound. The album and its reissue spawned four singles, including the worldwide success "Murder on the Dancefloor". On 16 October 2003 Ellis-Bextor released her sophomore studio album Shoot from the Hip. For the album, Ellis-Bextor worked with many musicians, including Alex James and Bernard Butler, which resulted in a Europop-influenced sound. It spawned the successful singles "Mixed Up World" and "I Won't Change You", which reached the top 10 of the UK Singles Chart.

On 28 March 2005 a collaboration between Busface and Ellis-Bextor—who was credited as Mademoiselle E.B.—titled "Circles (Just My Good Time)" was released. On 21 May 2007 Ellis-Bextor's third studio album Trip the Light Fantastic was released under Fascination Records. For the album, Ellis-Bextor worked with several writers and producers such as Greg Kurstin, Xenomania and Dimitri Tikovoi, which went towards an electro, pop and dance atmosphere. It produced the singles "Catch You", "Me and My Imagination" and "Today the Sun's on Us". In 2009 and 2010 Ellis-Bextor collaborated with the DJs Freemasons and Armin van Buuren on the dance-pop and EDM singles "Heartbreak (Make Me a Dancer)" and "Not Giving Up on Love". Junior Caldera also worked with Ellis-Bextor in the song "Can't Fight This Feeling", which was released on 2 April 2011.

On 16 October 2011 she released her fourth studio album Make a Scene under her independent label Douglas Valentine. For the album, she collaborated with several producers including Metronomy, Richard X and Calvin Harris, and delved into nu-disco and pop music. It produced three singles excluding Ellis-Bextor's collaborations with Freemasons, Caldera and van Buuren. Unlike her previous efforts, her fifth studio album Wanderlust saw her working exclusively with Ed Harcourt, resulting in a change of style from her other albums. It was mainly inspired by folk-pop, and has since spawned the singles "Young Blood" and "Runaway Daydreamer".

== Songs ==
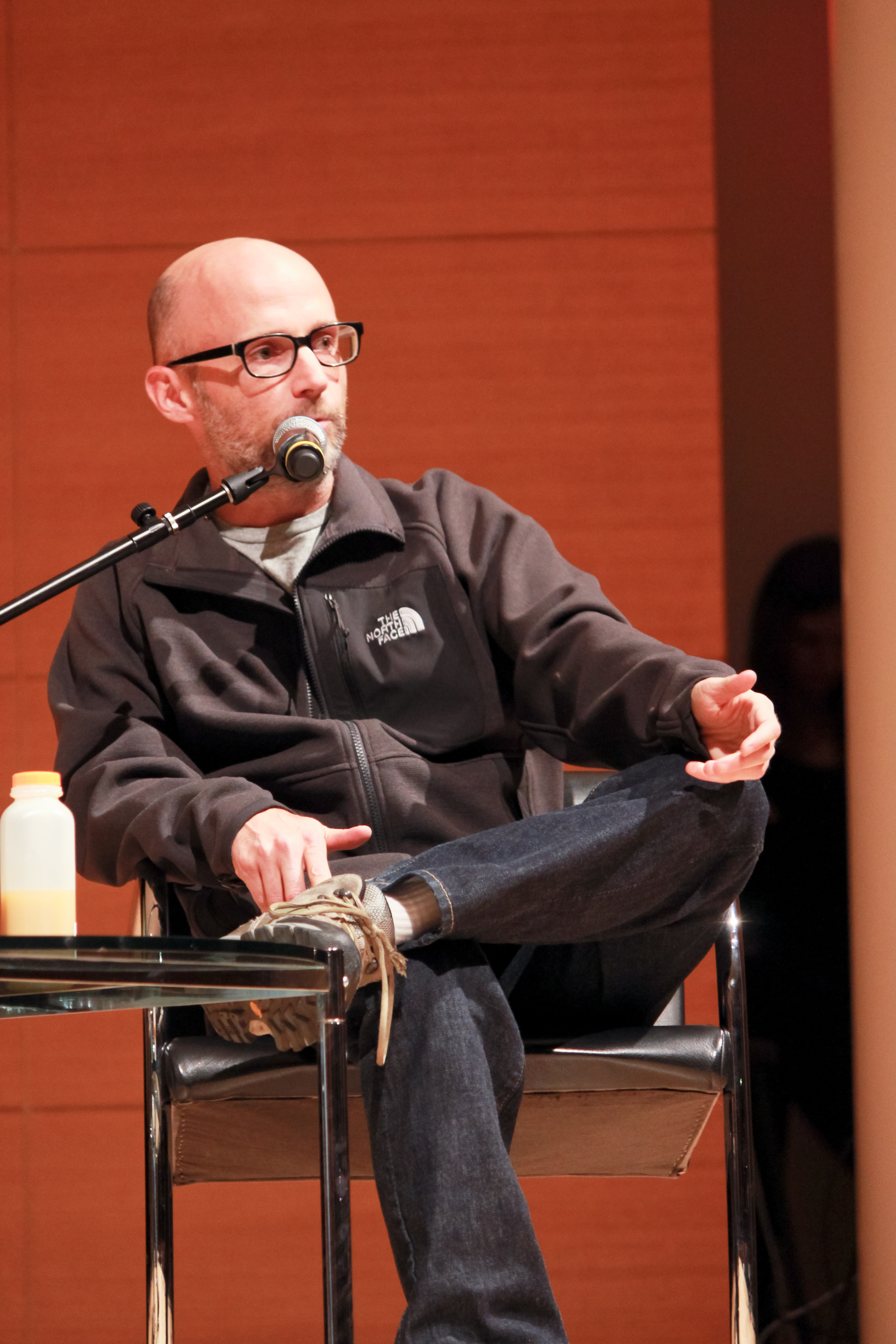
Moby worked with Ellis-Bextor on "Is It Any Wonder".

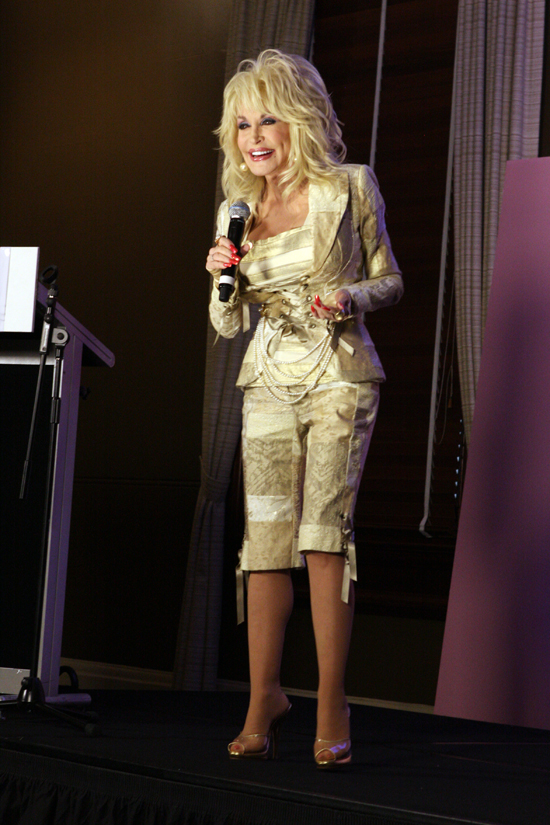
Ellis-Bextor covered the song "Jolene", as performed and written by Dolly Parton.

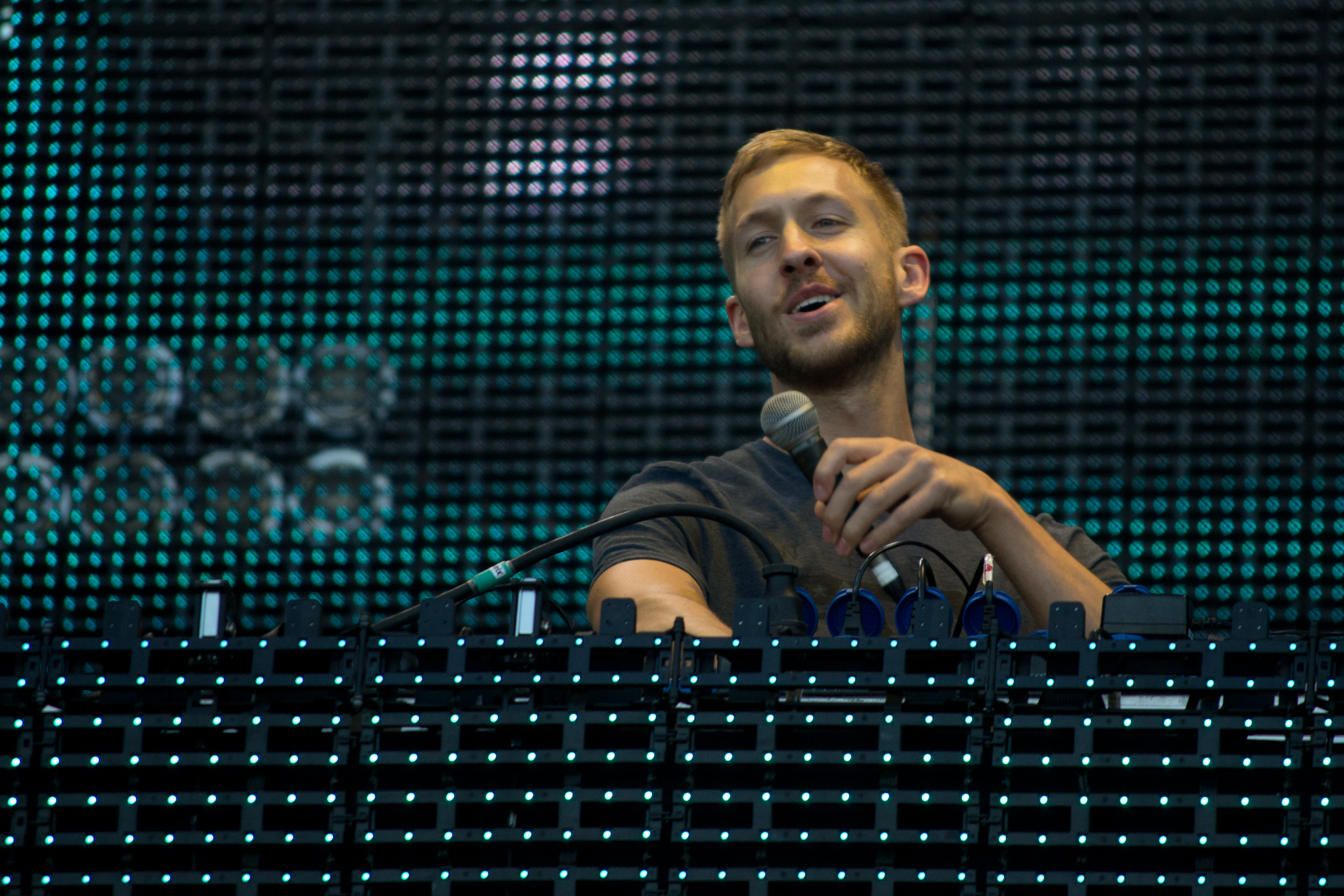
"Off & On" was co-written by Scottish DJ Calvin Harris.

Key
†	Indicates single release
#	Indicates promotional single release
‡	Indicates song written solely by Ellis-Bextor

Song	Artist(s)	Writer(s)	Album	Year	Ref.
"13 Little Dolls"	Sophie Ellis-Bextor	Sophie Ellis-Bextor; Ed Harcourt	Wanderlust	2014	
"Another Day" ‡	Sophie Ellis-Bextor	Sophie Ellis-Bextor	Shoot from the Hip	2003	
"Back 2 Paradise" †	Guéna LG & Amir Afargan featuring Sophie Ellis-Bextor	Amir Afargan; Sophie Ellis-Bextor; Guénaël Geay	Momentum (EP)	2014	
"Beautiful" †	Mathieu Bouthier featuring Sophie Ellis-Bextor	Mathieu Bouthier; Sophie Ellis-Bextor	—N/a	2012	
"Birth of an Empire"	Sophie Ellis-Bextor	Sophie Ellis-Bextor; Ed Harcourt	Wanderlust	2014	
"Bittersweet" †	Sophie Ellis-Bextor	James Wiltshire; Russell Small; Richard Stannard; Hannah Robinson; Sophie Ellis-Bextor	Make a Scene	2011	
"Black Holes for the Young"	Manic Street Preachers featuring Sophie Ellis-Bextor	James Dean Bradfield; Nick Jones; Sean Moore	—N/a	1998	
"By Chance"	Sophie Ellis-Bextor	Sophie Ellis-Bextor; Reza Safinia	Read My Lips	2001	
"Can't Fight This Feeling" †	Junior Caldera featuring Sophie Ellis-Bextor	Sophie Ellis-Bextor; Junior Caldera; Roselyn Della Sabina; Julien Carret	Début; Make a Scene	2011	
"Can't Have It All"	Sophie Ellis-Bextor	Sophie Ellis-Bextor; Eg White	Trip the Light Fantastic	2007	
"Cassandra"	Sophie Ellis-Bextor	Sophie Ellis-Bextor; Ed Harcourt	Familia	2016	
"Catch You" †	Sophie Ellis-Bextor	Cathy Dennis; Greg Kurstin	Trip the Light Fantastic	2007	
"China Heart"	Sophie Ellis-Bextor	Sophie Ellis-Bextor; Pascal Gabriel; Hannah Robinson	Trip the Light Fantastic	2007	
"(Christmas) Time"	Sophie Ellis-Bextor	Sophie Ellis-Bextor Jon Shave Uzoechi Emenike	Perimenopop	2025	
"Circles (Just My Good Time)" †	Busface featuring Mademoiselle E.B.^{[a]}	Hugh Brooker; Seb Wronski; Sophie Ellis-Bextor	Devils, Sharks & Spaceships	2005	
"Come with Us"	Sophie Ellis-Bextor	Sophie Ellis-Bextor; Ed Harcourt	Familia	2016	
"Cry to the Beat of the Band"	Sophie Ellis-Bextor	Sophie Ellis-Bextor; Ed Harcourt	Wanderlust	2014	
"Crystallise"	Sophie Ellis-Bextor	Sophie Ellis-Bextor; Ed Harcourt	Familia	2016	
"Cut Straight to the Heart"	Sophie Ellis-Bextor	Sophie Ellis-Bextor; Ed Harcourt; Dimitri Tikovoi	Make a Scene	2011	
"Dear Jimmy"	Sophie Ellis-Bextor	—N/a	Popjustice: 100% Solid Pop Music	2006	
"Death of Love"	Sophie Ellis-Bextor	Sophie Ellis-Bextor; Ed Harcourt	Familia	2016	
"Deep in Vogue" †	Rhyme So featuring Sophie Ellis-Bextor, Wuh Oh	David LeBolt; Malcolm McLaren	—N/a	2023	
"The Deer & The Wolf"	Sophie Ellis-Bextor	Sophie Ellis-Bextor; Ed Harcourt	Wanderlust	2014	
"Dial My Number"	Sophie Ellis-Bextor	Liam Howe; Hannah Robinson; Sophie Ellis-Bextor	Make a Scene	2011	
"Diamond In The Dark"	Sophie Ellis-Bextor	Sophie Ellis-Bextor David Arnold Ed Harcourt Nile Rodgers	Perimenopop	2025	
"Dolce Vita"	Sophie Ellis-Bextor	Sophie Ellis-Bextor Samuel Robert Knowles Baz Kaye David Arnold Ron Tyson Norman Harris Allan Wayne Felder Clementine Douglas	Perimenopop	2025	
"The Distance Between Us"	Sophie Ellis-Bextor	Sophie Ellis-Bextor; Liam Howe	Trip the Light Fantastic	2007	
"Don't Know What You've Got Until It's Gone"	Sophie Ellis-Bextor	Sophie Ellis-Bextor Luke Fitton Hannah Robinson	Perimenopop	2025	
"Don't Shy Away"	Sophie Ellis-Bextor	Sophie Ellis-Bextor; Ed Harcourt	Familia	2016	
"Down with Love"	Sophie Ellis-Bextor	Sophie Ellis-Bextor; Jewels & Stone; Rob Davis	—N/a^{[b]}	2007	
"Duel"	Sophie Ellis-Bextor	Claudia Brücken; Ralf Dörper; Michael Mertens	—N/a^{[c]}	2007	
"Everything Falls Into Place"	Sophie Ellis-Bextor	Sophie Ellis-Bextor; Andy Boyd; Ross Newell	Read My Lips	2001	
"Final Move"	Sophie Ellis-Bextor	Sophie Ellis-Bextor; Andy Boyd; Ross Newell	Read My Lips	2001	
"Freedom Of The Night"	Sophie Ellis-Bextor	Sophie Ellis-Bextor Duck Blackwell Shura Richard Stannard	Perimenopop	2025	
"Fuck With You" †	Bob Sinclar featuring Sophie Ellis-Bextor and Gilbere Forte	Vivian Kinda Kee Hamid; Ilan Kahn; Bob Sinclar	Disco Crash	2012	
"Get Over You" †	Sophie Ellis-Bextor	Sophie Ellis-Bextor; Jake Davies; Henrik Korpi; Mathias Johansson; Nina Woodford	Read My Lips	2002	
"Glamorous"	Sophie Ellis-Bextor	Sophie Ellis-Bextor Finn Keane Sigrid Solbakk Raabe	Perimenopop	2025	
"Groovejet (If This Ain't Love)" †	Spiller featuring Sophie Ellis-Bextor	Cristiano Spiller; Sophie Ellis-Bextor; Rob Davis	—N/a	2000	
"Heartbreak (Make Me a Dancer)" †	Freemasons featuring Sophie Ellis-Bextor	James Wiltshire; Russell Small; Richard Stannard; Sophie Ellis-Bextor	Shakedown 2 Make a Scene	2009	
"Heart Sing"	Sophie Ellis-Bextor	Sophie Ellis-Bextor Finn Keane David Arnold Sigrid Solbakk Raabe	Perimenopop	2025	
"Hello, Hello"	Sophie Ellis-Bextor	Sophie Ellis-Bextor; Damian LeGassick	Shoot from the Hip	2003	
"Here's to You"	Sophie Ellis-Bextor	Sophie Ellis-Bextor; Anu Pillai	—N/a^{[d]}	2007	
"Here Comes the Rapture"	Sophie Ellis-Bextor	Sophie Ellis-Bextor; Ed Harcourt	Familia	2016	
"Hush Little Voices"	Sophie Ellis-Bextor	Sophie Ellis-Bextor; Ed Harcourt	Familia	2016	
"Hypnotized"	Sophie Ellis-Bextor	Sophie Ellis-Bextor; Wuh Oh	TBA	2022	
"I Am Not Good at Not Getting What I Want"	Sophie Ellis-Bextor	Sophie Ellis-Bextor; Bernard Butler	Shoot from the Hip	2003	
"I Believe"	Sophie Ellis-Bextor	Sophie Ellis-Bextor; Tommy Danvers; Jony Rockstar	Read My Lips	2001	
"I Won't Change You" †	Sophie Ellis-Bextor	Sophie Ellis-Bextor; Gregg Alexander; Matt Rowe	Shoot from the Hip	2003	
"I Won't Dance With You"^{[e]}	Sophie Ellis-Bextor	Damian LeGassick; Sophie Ellis-Bextor	Shoot from the Hip	2003	
"If I Can't Dance"	Sophie Ellis-Bextor	Sophie Ellis-Bextor; Dimitri Tikovoi	Trip the Light Fantastic	2007	
"If You Go"	Sophie Ellis-Bextor	Sophie Ellis-Bextor; Brian Higgins; Miranda Cooper; Tim Powell	Trip the Light Fantastic	2007	
"Interlude"	Sophie Ellis-Bextor	Sophie Ellis-Bextor; Ed Harcourt	Wanderlust	2014	
"Is It Any Wonder"	Sophie Ellis-Bextor	Sophie Ellis-Bextor; R. Hall	Read My Lips	2001	
"Jolene"	Sophie Ellis-Bextor	Dolly Parton	Beautiful People soundtrack	2008	
"Layers"	Sophie Ellis-Bextor	Sophie Ellis-Bextor James Greenwood	Perimenopop	2025	
"Leave Me Out of It" †	The Feeling featuring Sophie Ellis-Bextor	Ciaran Jeremiah; Dan Gillespie Sells; Kevin Jeremiah	Together We Were Made	2011	
"Leave the Others Alone"	Sophie Ellis-Bextor	Sophie Ellis-Bextor; Andy Boyd; Ross Newell	Read My Lips	2001	
"Live It Up" (Acoustic version)^{[f]}	Sophie Ellis-Bextor	Sophie Ellis-Bextor	—N/a^{[g]}	2002	
"Love Is a Camera" †	Sophie Ellis-Bextor	Sophie Ellis-Bextor; Ed Harcourt	Wanderlust	2014	
"Love Is Here"	Sophie Ellis-Bextor	Sophie Ellis-Bextor; Dan Gillespie Sells	Trip the Light Fantastic	2007	
"Lover"	Sophie Ellis-Bextor	Sophie Ellis-Bextor; Andy Boyd; Ross Newell	Read My Lips	2001	
"Magic"	Sophie Ellis-Bextor	Sophie Ellis-Bextor; Richard X Hannah Robinson	Make a Scene	2011	
"Make a Scene"	Sophie Ellis-Bextor	Sophie Ellis-Bextor; Joseph Mount	Make a Scene	2011	
"Making Music"	Sophie Ellis-Bextor	Sophie Ellis-Bextor; Rob Davis	Shoot from the Hip	2003	
"Me and My Imagination" †	Sophie Ellis-Bextor	Sophie Ellis-Bextor; Hannah Robinson; Matt Prime	Trip the Light Fantastic	2007	
"Mixed Up World" †	Sophie Ellis-Bextor	Sophie Ellis-Bextor; Gregg Alexander; Matt Rowe	Shoot from the Hip	2003	
"Move This Mountain" †	Sophie Ellis-Bextor	Sophie Ellis-Bextor; Ben Hillier; Alex James	Read My Lips	2001	
"Move to the Music"	Sophie Ellis-Bextor	Pascal Gabriel; Sophie Ellis-Bextor	—N/a^{[d]}	2007	
"Murder on the Dancefloor" †	Sophie Ellis-Bextor	Gregg Alexander; Sophie Ellis-Bextor	Read My Lips	2001	
"Music Gets the Best of Me" †	Sophie Ellis-Bextor	Gregg Alexander; Sophie Ellis-Bextor; Matt Rowe	Read My Lips	2002	
"My Puppet Heart"	Sophie Ellis-Bextor	Sophie Ellis-Bextor; Ed Harcourt	Familia	2016	
"Never Let Me Down"	Sophie Ellis-Bextor	Andy Boyd; Ross Newell; Sophie Ellis-Bextor	—N/a^{[h]}	2001	
"New Flame"	Sophie Ellis-Bextor	Sophie Ellis-Bextor; Dimitri Tikovoi	Trip the Light Fantastic	2007	
"New York City Lights"	Sophie Ellis-Bextor	Sophie Ellis-Bextor; Matt Rowe; Richard Stannard	Trip the Light Fantastic	2007	
"Not Giving Up on Love" †	Armin van Buuren featuring Sophie Ellis-Bextor	Sophie Ellis-Bextor; Olivia Nervo; Miriam Nervo; Benno de Goeij; Armin van Buuren	Mirage; Make a Scene	2010	
"Nowhere Without You"	Sophie Ellis-Bextor	Sophie Ellis-Bextor; Rob Davis	Shoot from the Hip	2003	
"Off & On" #	Sophie Ellis-Bextor	Calvin Harris; Cathy Dennis; Róisín Murphy	Make a Scene	2011	
"Only Child" †	Dedrekoning featuring Sophie Ellis-Bextor	Richard Jones; Dimitri Tikovoï; Sophie Ellis-Bextor; Nick DeCosemo	TBA	2014	
"Only One"	Sophie Ellis-Bextor	Sophie Ellis-Bextor; Dan Gillespie Sells	Trip the Light Fantastic	2007	
"Party in My Head"	Sophie Ellis-Bextor	Sophie Ellis-Bextor; Gregg Alexander; Matt Rowe	Shoot from the Hip	2003	
"Physical"	Sophie Ellis-Bextor	Steve Kipner; Terry Shaddick	Shoot from the Hip	2003	
"Relentless Love"	Sophie Ellis-Bextor	Sophie Ellis-Bextor Samuel Robert Knowles Baz Kaye Janee Millicent Lucy Bennett	Perimenopop	2025	
"Revolution" †	Sophie Ellis-Bextor	Greg Kurstin; Cathy Dennis; Sophie Ellis-Bextor	Make a Scene	2011	
"Runaway Daydreamer" †	Sophie Ellis-Bextor	Sophie Ellis-Bextor; Ed Harcourt	Wanderlust	2014	
"The Saddest Happiness"	Sophie Ellis-Bextor	Sophie Ellis-Bextor; Ed Harcourt	Familia	2016	
"Sophia Loren"	Sophie Ellis-Bextor	Cathy Dennis	—N/a^{[i]}	2010	
"Sparkle"	Sophie Ellis-Bextor	Sophie Ellis-Bextor; Andy Boyd; Ross Newell	Read My Lips	2001	
"Starlight"	Sophie Ellis-Bextor	Sophie Ellis-Bextor; Richard X Hannah Robinson	Make a Scene	2011	
"Stay On Me"	Sophie Ellis-Bextor	Sophie Ellis-Bextor Thomas Hull Caroline Ailin Selena Gomez Julia Michaels	Perimenopop	2025	
"Supersonic"	Sophie Ellis-Bextor	Sophie Ellis-Bextor; Fred Schneider; Bruce Brody; James Staub	Trip the Light Fantastic	2007	
"Take Me Home" †	Sophie Ellis-Bextor	Bob Esty; Michele Aller; Sophie Ellis-Bextor	Read My Lips	2001	
"Taste"	Sophie Ellis-Bextor	Sophie Ellis-Bextor Jon Shave Uzoechi Emenike	Perimenopop	2025	
"Time"	Sophie Ellis-Bextor	Sophie Ellis-Bextor Jon Shave Uzoechi Emenike	Perimenopop	2025	
"Today the Sun's on Us" †	Sophie Ellis-Bextor	Sophie Ellis-Bextor; Steve Robson; Nina Woodford	Trip the Light Fantastic	2007	
"The Universe Is You"	Sophie Ellis-Bextor	Sophie Ellis-Bextor; Andy Boyd; Ross Newell	Read My Lips	2001	
"Unrequired"	Sophie Ellis-Bextor	Sophie Ellis-Bextor; Ed Harcourt	Familia	2016	
"Until the Stars Collide"	Sophie Ellis-Bextor	Sophie Ellis-Bextor; Ed Harcourt	Wanderlust	2014	
"Vertigo"	Sophie Ellis-Bextor	Sophie Ellis-Bextor James Greenwood David Arnold Hannah Robinson	Perimenopop	2025	
"The Walls Keep Saying Your Name" ‡	Sophie Ellis-Bextor	Sophie Ellis-Bextor	Shoot from the Hip	2003	
"What Have We Started?"	Sophie Ellis-Bextor	Sophie Ellis-Bextor; Pascal Gabriel; Hannah Robinson	Trip the Light Fantastic	2007	
"When the Storm Has Blown Over"	Sophie Ellis-Bextor	Sophie Ellis-Bextor; Ed Harcourt	Wanderlust	2014	
"Wild Forever"	Sophie Ellis-Bextor	Sophie Ellis-Bextor; Ed Harcourt	Familia	2016	
"Wrong Side of the Sun"	Sophie Ellis-Bextor	Sophie Ellis-Bextor; Ed Harcourt	Wanderlust	2014	
"Yes Sir, I Can Boogie"	Sophie Ellis-Bextor	Frank Dostal; Rolf Soja	—N/a^{[b]}	2003	
"You Get Yours"	Sophie Ellis-Bextor	Sophie Ellis-Bextor; Andy Boyd; Ross Newell	Shoot from the Hip	2003	
"Young Blood" †	Sophie Ellis-Bextor	Sophie Ellis-Bextor; Ed Harcourt	Wanderlust	2013	

== Notes ==
a In this single release, Ellis-Bextor was credited as Mademoiselle E.B.
b This was a B-side to "I Won't Change You".
c This was a B-side to "Catch You".
d This was a B-side to "Today the Sun's on Us".
e These were B-sides to "Me and My Imagination".
f "I Won't Dance With You" was incorrectly typed as "I Won't Dance Without You" on the first UK pressing of Shoot from the Hip.
g There only exists an acoustic version of B-side "Live It Up".
h This was a B-side to "Get Over You/Move This Mountain".
i This was a B-side to "Murder on the Dancefloor".
j This was a B-side to "Bittersweet".
