= Sophie Ellis-Bextor =

British singer (born 1979)

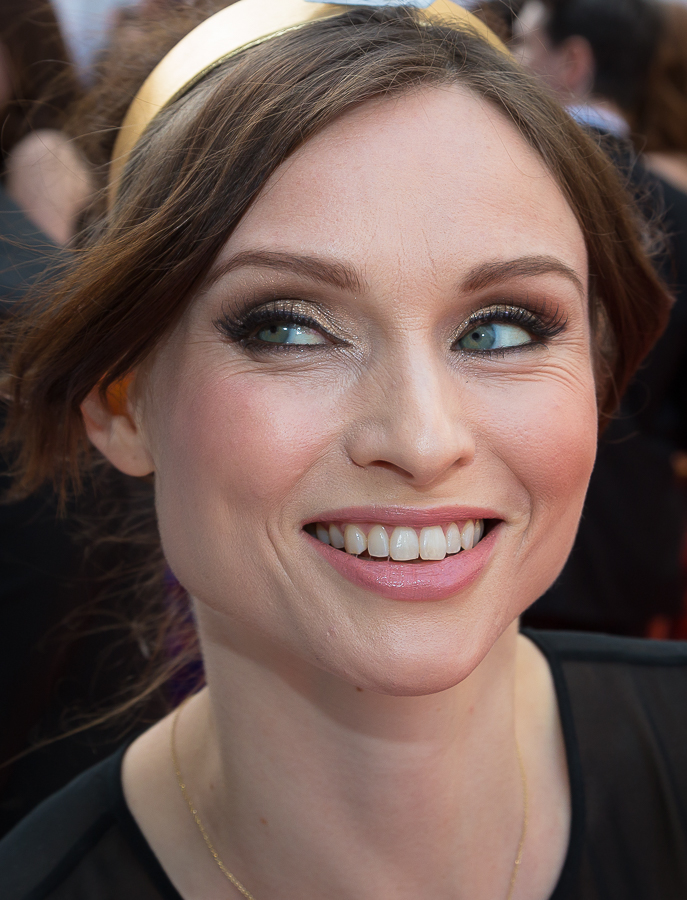
- Ellis-Bextor at the 2015 British Academy Television Awards
- Born: Sophie Michelle Ellis-Bextor; 10 April 1979 (age 47); Isleworth, London, England
- Occupations: Singer; songwriter
- Years active: 1996–present
- Works: Discography
- Spouse: Richard Jones (m. 2005)
- Children: 5
- Parents: Robin Bextor (father); Janet Ellis (mother)
- Musical career
- Genres: Pop; nu-disco; house; indie pop
- Labels: Polydor; Fascination; Interscope; EBGB's; Cooking Vinyl; Decca
- Formerly of: theaudience
- Website: sophieellisbextor.net

Sophie Michelle Ellis-Bextor (born 10 April 1979) is an English singer and songwriter. She first came to prominence in the late 1990s as the lead vocalist of the indie rock band theaudience. After the group disbanded, Ellis-Bextor went solo and achieved success beginning in the early 2000s. Her music is mainstream pop and dance with influences of disco, nu-disco, and 1980s electronic music.

In 2000, Ellis-Bextor collaborated with Italian DJ Spiller on "Groovejet (If This Ain't Love)", which reached number one in the United Kingdom and in 2015 became the UK's biggest-selling vinyl single of the millennium so far. Her debut solo studio album, Read My Lips, was released in 2001 and peaked at number two on the UK Albums Chart. It was certified double platinum by the BPI, and sold 1.5 million copies worldwide. Three of its four singles—the Cher cover "Take Me Home", "Murder on the Dancefloor", and double A-side "Get Over You" / "Move This Mountain"—reached the top three in the UK. Its follow-up Shoot from the Hip (2003) reached number 19 in the UK and spawned two top ten singles, "Mixed Up World" and "I Won't Change You".

Ellis-Bextor's third studio album, Trip the Light Fantastic (2007), peaked at number seven in the UK and its lead single "Catch You" reached the top ten. Her fourth studio album, Make a Scene (2011), and its third single "Bittersweet" achieved top 40 positions in the UK. Whilst signed to Cooking Vinyl, she released a trilogy of albums produced by Ed Harcourt: the folk-influenced Wanderlust (2014), the Latin-infused Familia (2016), and the Japanese-inspired Hana (2023). She experienced a resurgence in popularity when "Murder on the Dancefloor" was featured in the 2023 film Saltburn, which led to the song matching its original peak of number two on the UK Singles Chart. Her eighth studio album Perimenopop was released under Decca Records in September 2025 to critical praise.

== Early life ==
Sophie Michelle Ellis-Bextor was born on 10 April 1979 in Isleworth, London to Janet Ellis, who was a presenter on BBC's children's television programmes Blue Peter and Jigsaw, and Robin Bextor, a film producer and director. They separated when she was four. As a child, Ellis-Bextor occasionally appeared on Blue Peter alongside her mother, who co-presented the programme.

She attended St Stephen's School, Twickenham, and the independent Godolphin and Latymer School in Hammersmith. Some of her earliest public performances were with the W11 Opera children's opera, beginning at age 13, and she is now a patron of the organisation.

Ellis-Bextor has said, "I didn't see myself as a good-looking girl and that was good, because I didn't rely on it. [...] I've now found lots of like-minded weirdos, so it's OK."

== Career ==
=== 1996–1999: Theaudience ===
Ellis-Bextor began her professional musical career in 1996 while singing lead vocals in indie band theaudience. The band released four singles, including the UK Top 40 hits "I Know Enough (I Don't Get Enough)" and "A Pessimist Is Never Disappointed", and a self-titled album (theaudience (1998)). Videos for the band's singles were directed by her father, Robin Bextor. While in Theaudience, readers of Melody Maker voted Ellis-Bextor number five in a poll of 'most sexy people in rock'.

The band split in 1999 after demos for a planned second album were rejected by their label Mercury Records, who then dropped the band. Ellis-Bextor recorded a duet with Manic Street Preachers — "Black Holes for the Young" — as a B-side for their 1998 single "The Everlasting", and in 1999, made an appearance on the Departure Lounge album Out of Here.

=== 2000–2006: Read My Lips and Shoot from the Hip ===
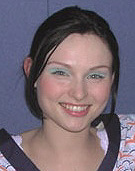
Ellis-Bextor in 2005

After Theaudience split, Ellis-Bextor collaborated with Italian DJ Spiller, in 2000, adding vocals to his track "Groovejet (If This Ain't Love)". It entered the UK charts at number one, just beating former Spice Girl Victoria Beckham on her first solo track. "Groovejet" won several awards: No. 1, Pop Top 20; No. 1, ILR; No. 1, Radio 1; No. 8, top dance track of 2000 and single of the year in Melody Maker. In Metro newspaper, it received ninth place in the contest for the Greatest No 1 of all time (so far). In 2000, it was a finalist in Record of the Year. In that same year, it won the awards for Best Single and Best Ibiza Tune at the Ericsson Muzik Awards.

In 2001, Ellis-Bextor released her debut album, Read My Lips. It reached number two on the UK charts and spawned four top-20 hit singles. Her rework of Cher's "Take Me Home" reached number two, as did "Murder on the Dancefloor", which became Ellis-Bextor's biggest single and was on the chart for 23 weeks. "Murder on the Dancefloor" became Europe's most played song of 2002. In 2002, Read My Lips was re-released with two new songs (and a live version of "Groovejet") and Ellis-Bextor won the Recording Artist Award at that year's Showbusiness Awards. Her third single, "Get Over You / Move This Mountain", was released in June 2002 and reached number three. The fourth single, "Music Gets the Best of Me", rose to number 14 in December. At the beginning of 2002, Ellis-Bextor was nominated for the British Female Solo Artist BRIT Award, going on to be nominated for a further two consecutive years.

Her second album, Shoot from the Hip, was released in October 2003 and yielded two further top-ten singles, "Mixed Up World" and "I Won't Change You". The album reached number 19 on the UK charts and was certified silver by the BPI for shipments of 60,000. Ellis-Bextor described the album as "more emotionally direct" and "a little more left-of-centre at times" than Read My Lips—"It has more of a live feel [...] It's still a pop album—with elements of disco, indie and rock." She opted to step back from promotion of the album after becoming pregnant.

In 2005, Ellis-Bextor was featured on the Busface single "Circles (Just My Good Time)" under the alias Mademoiselle E.B.

=== 2007–2011: Trip the Light Fantastic and Make a Scene ===
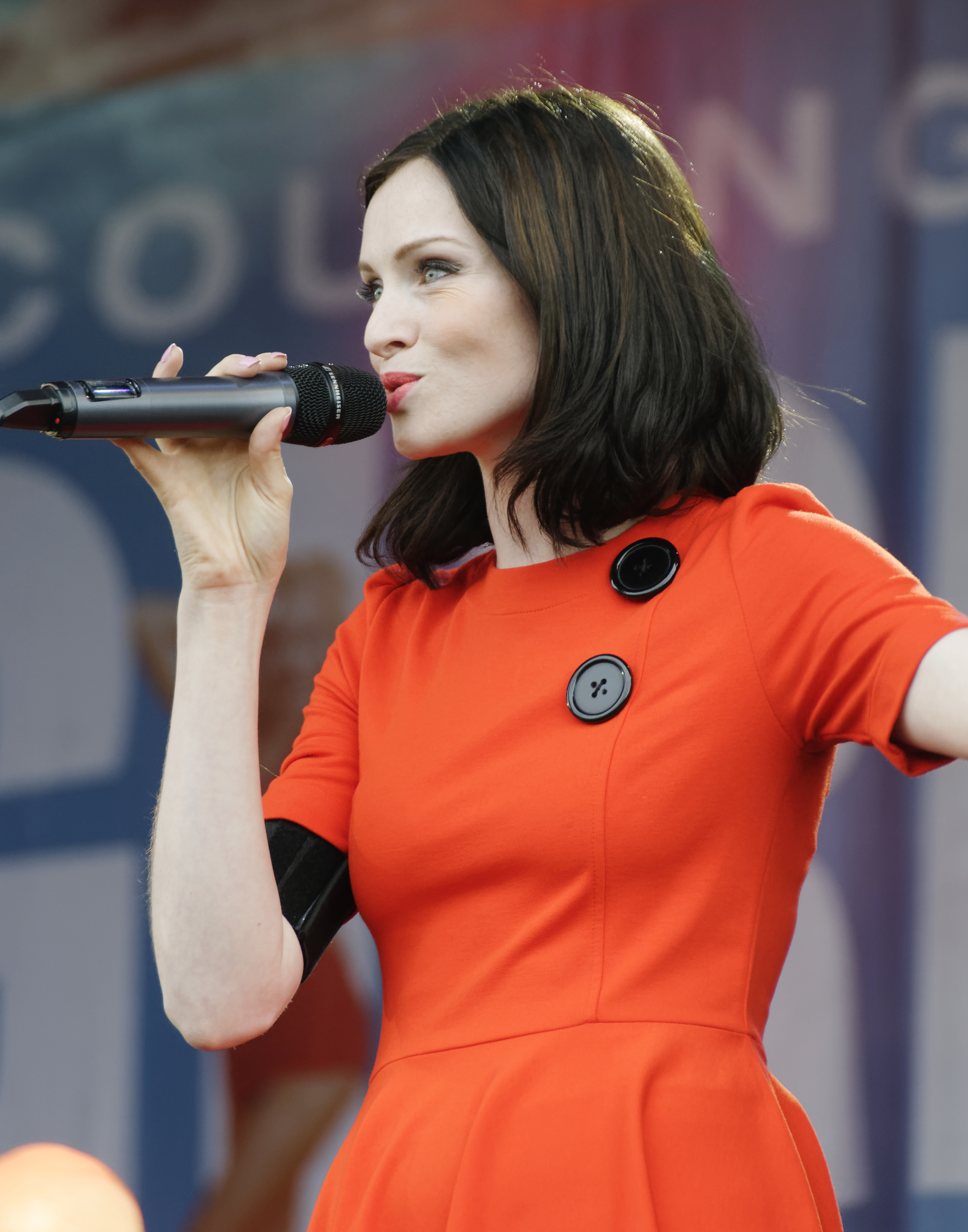
Ellis-Bextor performing at Audley End Picnic Concert in July 2011

Trip the Light Fantastic, Ellis-Bextor's third album, was released in May 2007 and reached number seven in the UK. The album produced three singles: "Catch You" (number 8 in the UK), "Me and My Imagination" (number 23), and "Today the Sun's on Us" (number 64). The song "If I Can't Dance" was announced as a single but later retracted.

Ellis-Bextor supported George Michael on his UK tour leg in June 2007. Her own UK tour, the Trip the Light Fantastic Tour, was due to start in August 2007, but it was postponed after Ellis-Bextor was invited to be the "special guest" on Take That's Beautiful World Tour, which commenced in October 2007. She stated that her tour would be rescheduled for March 2008, with all tickets purchased being valid for the rescheduled concerts. The tour was never rescheduled and Ellis-Bextor declined to discuss the issue in interviews. In October 2008, she sang at the Keep the Promise Rally in Trafalgar Square to end Child Poverty.

In June 2009, Ellis-Bextor was featured on the Freemasons single "Heartbreak (Make Me a Dancer)", which reached number 13 in the UK. In July, she performed alongside girl groups the Saturdays and Girls Can't Catch at the iTunes Festival, held at the Roundhouse in London. A recording of her performance was released, Sophie Ellis-Bextor: iTunes Live in London, which was the singer's first extended play. "Bittersweet" (co-written by Freemasons and Hannah Robinson), the first single from Ellis-Bextor's fourth album, was released in May 2010 and reached 25 on the UK Singles Chart. Ellis-Bextor's collaboration with DJ Armin van Buuren, "Not Giving Up on Love", was released as a single in August 2010 in Europe. Also in 2010, she was featured on the Junior Caldera single "Can't Fight This Feeling".

The singer's fourth album, Make a Scene, was released in June 2011 following a year-long delay during which she left her label Universal Music Group to establish her own label, EBGBs. She said that her decision to leave Universal was spurred on by the departure of the head of Fascination Records, the sub-label to which she was signed following the release of "Bittersweet". She described Make a Scene as "very much [a dance album]—more so than any of my other albums." She said she was planning an "album that's really different [...] but I think this album [Make a Scene] is a good way to bow out of the dance sound for now. I think it's finishing on a high." She supported Pet Shop Boys on the UK leg of their Pandemonium Tour in July 2010. She worked with Calvin Harris, Richard X, Dimitri Tikovoi, Hannah Robinson, Metronomy, and Liam Howe from the Sneaker Pimps. "Off & On" preceded the release of the album in continental Europe and Russia, where the album was released by Universal Music Russia. The single "Starlight" was released in the UK ahead of the album in May 2011.

Ellis-Bextor supported synth-pop band Erasure on their Total Pop! Forest tour of woodland locations in the UK in June 2011. She resumed touring internationally in 2011, playing venues such as Jakarta's SoulNation festival, as well as returning to Australia by performing in Sydney and Melbourne. She collaborated with French DJ Bob Sinclar on a track titled "F__ with You" (released in November 2011); it was included on his album Disco Crash and was a huge club hit in continental Europe. Ellis-Bextor's collaboration with French DJ Mathieu Bouthier, "Beautiful", was released in July 2012 in France.

=== 2012–2014: Wanderlust and collaborations ===
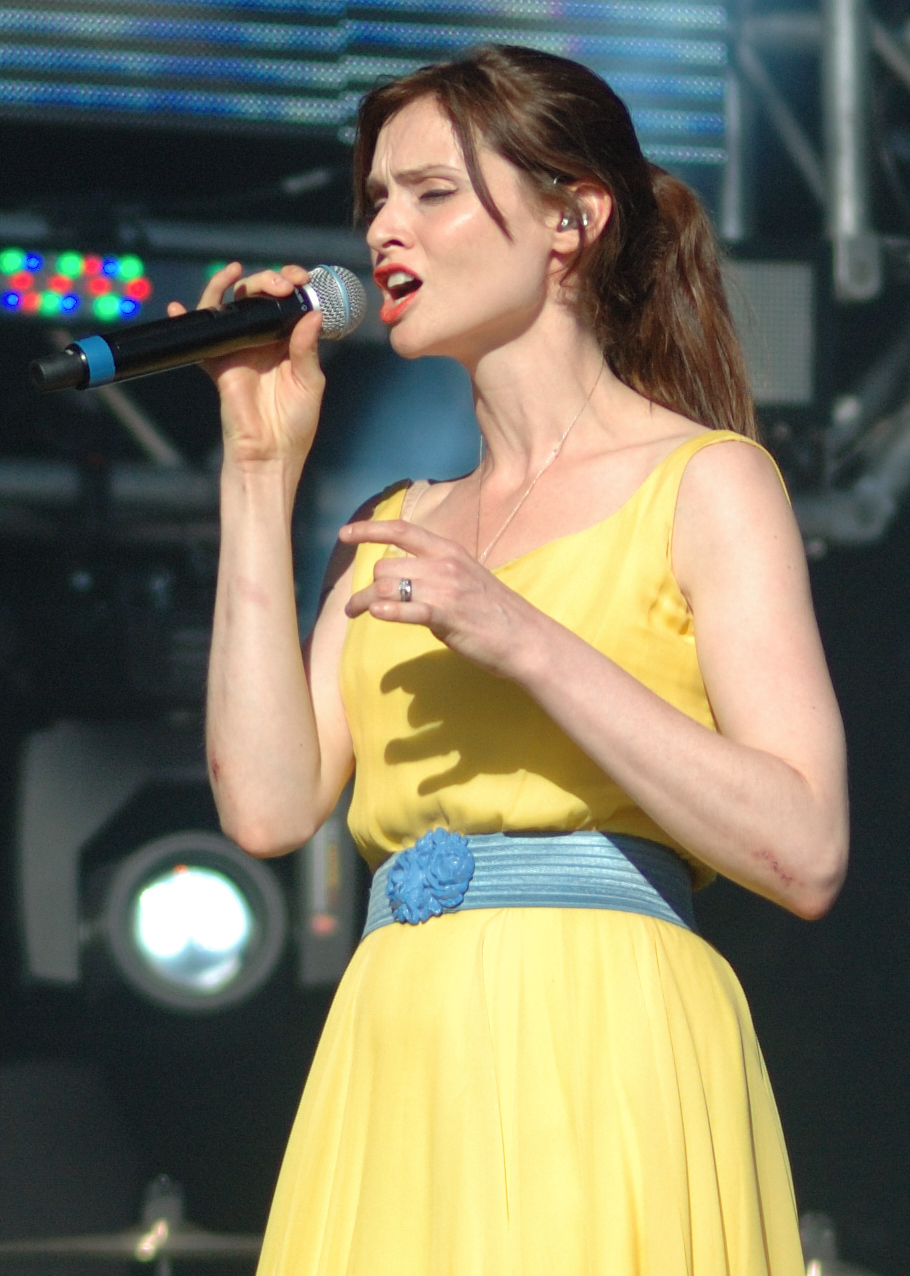
Ellis-Bextor performing in 2013

In May 2011, she revealed that she had begun work on her fifth album. Beginning in 2012, Ellis-Bextor worked with British singer and producer Ed Harcourt on a "more concept driven record", and possibly having as few as eight tracks. Her performance at a London charity gala in November 2012 including a new song, "Young Blood"; a demo of the song was released in March 2013 as a complimentary digital download from her website, as a thank you gift to her fans. Also in 2013, she performed outdoors at Old Republic Square in Almaty, Kazakhstan. Ellis-Bextor confirmed completion of the album in May and revealed its title, Wanderlust, and cover art in October.

"Young Blood" was released as the lead single from Wanderlust in November 2013, peaking at number three on the UK Indie Chart and at number 34 on the UK Singles Chart. The album was released in January 2014 and peaked at number four on the UK Albums Chart and at number one on the UK Independent Albums Chart. Wanderlust also debuted inside the Scottish Top 10 Albums Chart. Ellis-Bextor performed a headline sold-out show to support Wanderlust's release in January 2014 at Bush Hall, London, and also performed at Union Chapel, London in April. Ellis-Bextor then announced a 10-date UK tour, which finished in Glasgow in April 2014.

Ellis-Bextor collaborated with Guéna LG and Amir Afargan on the track "Back 2 Paradise", which was released in June 2014. The single was the number-one "breakout" in October 2014 on the US Billboard Dance/Club Chart, later reaching number 25 on the Dance/Club Chart. Ellis-Bextor then featured on the song "Only Child", produced by electronic music project DedRekoning, which was released in September 2014. The track was remixed by Paul Oakenfold, Roddy Reynaert and Pearson and Hirst.

=== 2015–2019: Familia and The Song Diaries ===
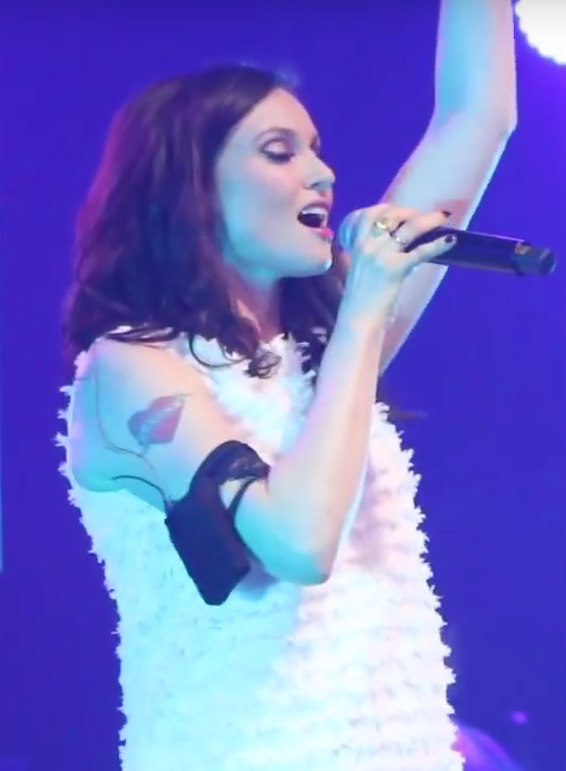
Ellis-Bextor performing at White Party in Bangkok, Thailand in 2017

In January 2015, Ellis-Bextor said that she had begun working on her sixth studio album, once again with Ed Harcourt. In January 2016, Ellis-Bextor posted an image on Instagram captioned "Last song written. Next stop – rehearsals! #album6 #whatthehellshouldicallit." She also posted a YouTube video of the making of the album. According to Ellis-Bextor, the album, titled Familia, was inspired by a recent visit to North America, particularly Mexico. Familia is the Spanish word for "family" (she also has the term as a tattoo on her right arm) and she described the album's sound as closer to that of her earlier albums. She explained that she "wanted something with a Spanish or Italian feel" and that it continued some stories from Wanderlust. Familia was released in September 2016 and reached number 12 on the UK Albums Chart. It spawned four singles, but none of them made it into any major chart. After taking time off for the birth of her child in late 2015, she resumed touring in 2017, mostly at small venues in the UK.

In November 2017, she announced via Facebook a selection of her greatest hits reworked with an orchestra. In February 2018, she announced the album's title, The Song Diaries, and pointed out that it would consist of re-recorded tracks spanning her career from theaudience to Familia's "Wild Forever", plus a new track. The album's artwork was drawn by David Downtown. The Song Diaries first single "Love Is You", a disco track originally performed by Carol Williams, which is sampled on her early hit Groovejet, was released in August 2018. The Song Diaries was released in March 2019 and peaked at number 14 in the UK.

=== 2020–2023: Songs from the Kitchen Disco ===
In 2020, during the COVID-19 pandemic lockdown in the UK, Ellis-Bextor performed live weekly "Kitchen Disco" concerts featuring herself and her family, streamed live from their kitchen on Instagram. It ultimately became a BBC Radio 2 show since, and airs weekly. Beginning 24 June 2020, Ellis-Bextor started a weekly podcast titled Spinning Plates with Sophie Ellis-Bextor on which she interviews working mothers. Guests have included Fearne Cotton, Caitlin Moran, Myleene Klass, Róisin Murphy, and her own mother Janet Ellis.

On 16 July 2020, Ellis-Bextor announced the greatest hits album Songs from the Kitchen Disco. The album was preceded by the release of a single, "Crying at the Discoteque", a cover version of the Alcazar song, which she had performed during her lockdown concerts in September 2020. She performed the single on The Graham Norton Show on New Year's Eve. In March 2022, she embarked on her "Songs from the Kitchen Disco" tour of the UK In July 2022, the singer revealed a new single, "Hypnotized", a collaboration with electronic artist Wuh Oh.

A live album was released in November 2022 entitled Kitchen Disco – Live at the London Palladium.

=== 2023–present: Hana, resurgence, and Perimenopop ===
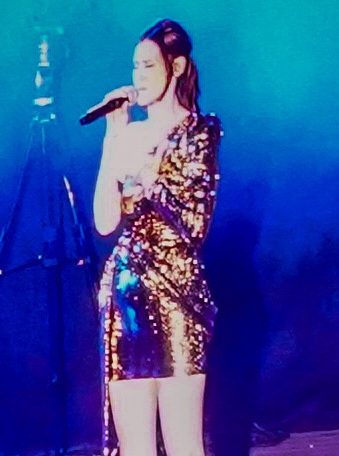
Ellis-Bextor performing at the Eurovision Village during the Eurovision Song Contest 2023

In January 2023, Ellis-Bextor collaborated with Japanese/Australian duo Rhyme So on a cover of the Malcolm McLaren track "Deep in Vogue". On 8 February 2023, Ellis-Bextor revealed a new track, "Breaking the Circle", the lead single from her seventh studio album, Hana, which was released on 2 June 2023. The title of the album was taken from the Japanese word for "blossom" or "flower". Ellis-Bextor said the album was inspired by a trip to Japan, taken before the COVID-19 pandemic began. Ellis-Bextor said of the album: "Because I hadn't been before, I had lots of ideas about what [Japan] might be like. The [album's] soundscape is like someone's idea of what a place might be like before they get there. That trip also became significant in a wider sense because it was the last bit of travel I did before everything shut down." Hana marks the third collaboration with producer/musician Ed Harcourt. Ellis-Bextor said "There are themes of optimism, new starts, adventures and reflections....This is our third record together after Wanderlust and Familia. The first songs written were really inspired by the upcoming trip to Japan. In the end, the album ended up being inspired by that trip and so much more."

In July 2023, it was announced that Ellis-Bextor will collaborate with film composer David Arnold and lyricist Don Black for the track to Channel 4 and Universal Pictures film, Mog's Christmas, based upon the children's book series by Judith Kerr. The track, titled "As Long As I Belong", is about "the importance of belonging". Ellis-Bextor also collaborated with Robbie Williams and his electronic music project Lufthaus on the track "Immortal", which is taken from the group's debut album, Visions, Vol. 1. The album was released on 6 October 2023.

Ellis-Bextor's "Murder on the Dancefloor" was featured in the last scene of the 2023 film Saltburn. As a result, the song re-entered the UK singles chart, peaking at number two and garnered its most-ever global streams on Spotify, receiving more than 1.4 million streams on New Year's Eve. It also gave Ellis-Bextor her first ever US singles chart entry, reaching number 51. As well as this, 2024 became Ellis-Bextor's most successful year in terms of performances, playing more shows than she had ever before – a total of 110 in the calendar year.

On 1 February 2024, it was revealed that Ellis-Bextor will be performing at Valley Fest 2024 in Chew Magna in August 2024. The same month, Ellis-Bextor announced her first-ever North American headlining tour, scheduled for May and June 2024. The initial seven-date tour included stops in San Francisco, San Diego, Washington D.C., Boston, Philadelphia, New York City, and Toronto. In June 2024, she announced a second North American tour leg for September given the first leg's success, adding shows in Chicago, Denver, Los Angeles, Portland, Seattle, and Vancouver. Following the resurgence of "Murder on the Dancefloor", Ellis-Bextor reportedly signed with Universal Music Group. On 17 May 2025, she served as the United Kingdom's spokesperson for the Eurovision Song Contest 2025. She stepped in as a late replacement for Ncuti Gatwa.

Her eighth studio album Perimenopop was released on 12 September 2025 via Decca Records and debuted at number 5 in the UK. The album was preceded by the singles, "Freedom of the Night", "Relentless Love", "Vertigo", "Taste", "Dolce Vita", and "Stay on Me". In November 2025, it was announced that singer Olly Alexander had teamed up with Mighty Hoopla to perform a one-off concert, Trans Mission, on 11 March 2026, in aid of trans-solidarity charities Good Law Project and Not a Phase; other performers included Ellis-Bextor, Sugababes, Wolf Alice and Beth Ditto.

== Other projects ==
In 2001 Ellis-Bextor auditioned for the 2001 film Moulin Rouge! for the character Satine. In 2007, she appeared at Christmas in the Robbie the Reindeer episode "Close Encounters of the Herd Kind". She was depicted as a female alien at the closure of the story singing the song "Supersonic", the last track on her third solo studio album Trip the Light Fantastic. In November of the same year, she also launched the npower Greener Schools Programme, which aims to give schools in the UK a "green makeover" by providing free energy audits, implementing tailor-made energy efficiency measures to reduce their carbon footprint, and educating children on how to be greener. In 2007 she launched Capital Radio's Capital 95.8 "Lights Out London" campaign, which asked Londoners to switch off their lights for one hour in a bid to save 750 MWh and send a message to the world on the importance of climate change.

In 2008 she featured in the short musical film The Town that Boars Me by photographer Ben Charles Edwards. The film also features Jodie Harsh, Kelly Osbourne and Zandra Rhodes. The film was produced by Glass Loves and Shoot to Kill Productions and was set to début at the Portobello Film Festival. The same year she fronted a campaign for The Children's Society encouraging people to log onto the Hundreds and Thousands of Childhood Memories website to donate their favourite childhood memory. In May 2008 she was hired by cosmetics brand Rimmel to be one of their new faces. A song of hers, "Sophia Loren", was featured in one of the Rimmel London television adverts for the line "Sexy Curves". She appeared as an advocate for Verdi on BBC World News classical music programme Visionaries. She was a contestant in the eleventh series of the televised dance competition Strictly Come Dancing in late 2013. She was partnered with Brendan Cole and reached the final, placing fourth.

In September 2014 the Pretty Polly hosiery company announced that Ellis-Bextor was their latest "face and legs", and would be designing and modelling for them. In March 2019 Ellis-Bextor appeared as an extra in "The Long Night", the episode of Game of Thrones in which the living defeat the Army of the Dead. In July 2020 she started a podcast called Spinning Plates which focuses on mothers and their careers. In the same year she competed in the second series of The Masked Singer as Alien.

In 2021, Ellis-Bextor wrote the memoir Music, Men, Motherhood and Me.

It was announced in October 2021 that she would make an appearance in the Australian soap opera Neighbours in 2022, during a storyline set in London. On the morning of 16 November 2021 Ellis-Bextor embarked upon a 24-hour "Kitchen Disco Danceathon", in aid of Children in Need. She raised over £1,000,000 for the cause. In December 2022, Ellis-Bextor partnered with Vodafone to unveil its Pro II Broadband during a special Christmas concert in London.

In October 2023 Ellis-Bextor was a guest celebrity judge in the episode Club Bangers of the British reality television series RuPaul's Drag Race UK broadcast on BBC Three.

On 3 August 2024, Ellis-Bextor opened the set for Brighton Pride's Fabuloso concert in Preston Park. She played a number of her hits including "Take Me Home", "Murder on the Dancefloor" and "Get Over You".

== Personal life ==
Ellis-Bextor met her future husband, the Feeling bassist Richard Jones, when he auditioned for her tour band in 2002. Jones has said, "Something kind of smacked us in the face. The chemistry was incredible—it was like nothing I've ever experienced." Their first child was born two months early, only eight months after the start of their relationship. Fourteen months later, on 25 June 2005, the couple married in Città di Castello in Umbria, Italy. They have five sons, born in 2004, 2009, 2012, 2015, and 2019.

Ellis-Bextor suffered from pre-eclampsia (the onset of high blood pressure) during her first two pregnancies, resulting in both deliveries being premature. She is an ambassador for Borne, a medical research charity looking into the causes of premature birth. She is also an ambassador for the children's charity Lumos which promotes an end to the institutionalisation of children worldwide, as well as the organisation mothers2mothers, which provides healthcare to families most in need.

In the 2019 European Parliament election, Ellis-Bextor endorsed Change UK. Her father, Robin Bextor, was a candidate for the South East Region.

== Discography ==
- Read My Lips (2001)
- Shoot from the Hip (2003)
- Trip the Light Fantastic (2007)
- Make a Scene (2011)
- Wanderlust (2014)
- Familia (2016)
- Hana (2023)
- Perimenopop (2025)

== Awards and nominations ==
Year	Awards	Work	Category	Result	Ref.
1999	NME Awards	Theaudience	Best New Band	Nominated	
2000	The Record of the Year	"Groovejet"	Record of the Year	Nominated	
2000	Smash Hits Poll Winners Party	"Groovejet"	Best Dance Choon	Nominated	
2000	Ericsson Muzik Awards	"Groovejet"	Best Single	Won	
2000	Ericsson Muzik Awards	"Groovejet"	Best Ibiza Tune	Won	
2001	Brit Awards	"Groovejet"	Best British Single	Nominated	
2001	DanceStar Awards	"Groovejet"	Capital FM Worldwide Record of the Year	Won	
2002	Music Television Awards	Herself	Best New Act	Nominated	
2002	Music Television Awards	Herself	Best Dance	Nominated	
2002	MTV Europe Music Awards	Herself	Best Dance	Nominated	
2002	Variety Club of Great Britain Awards	Herself	Recording Artist Award	Won	
2002	Pop Factory Awards	Herself	Best Pop Factory Performance	Nominated	
2002	Brit Awards	Herself	British Female Solo Artist	Nominated	
2003	Brit Awards	Herself	British Female Solo Artist	Nominated	
2003	ECHO Awards	Herself	Best International Newcomer	Nominated	
2003	Hungarian Music Awards	Read My Lips	Best Foreign Dance Album	Won	
2003	APRA Music Awards	"Murder on the Dancefloor"	Most Performed Foreign Work	Nominated	
2003	Top of the Pops Awards	Herself	Most Annoying Voice	Nominated	
2003	Top of the Pops Awards	Herself	Pop Posho	Won	
2003	NRJ Music Awards	Herself	International Breakthrough of the Year	Nominated	
2003	NRJ Music Awards	"Murder on the Dancefloor"	International Song of the Year	Nominated	
2004	Brit Awards	Herself	British Female Solo Artist	Nominated	
2007	Popjustice £20 Music Prize	"Catch You"	Best British Pop Single	Nominated	
2009	Love Radio Awards	Straight to the Heart Tour	Concert of the Year	Nominated	
2010	Popjustice £20 Music Prize	"Bittersweet"	Best British Pop Single	Nominated	
2011	International Dance Music Awards	"Not Giving Up on Love" (with Armin van Buuren)	Best Commercial Dance Track	Nominated	
2011	International Dance Music Awards	"Not Giving Up on Love" (with Armin van Buuren)	Best Trance Track	Won	
2014	AIM Independent Music Awards	Herself	Best Live Act	Won	
2014	UK Festival Awards	Herself	Best Breakthrough Artist	Nominated	
2025	Music Week Awards	Herself	Catalogue Marketing Campaign	Nominated	
2025	BMI Pop Awards	"Murder on the Dancefloor"	Award-Winning Song	Won	
2025	BMI London Awards	"Murder on the Dancefloor"	Award-Winning Song	Won	
2025	Silver Clef Awards	Herself	Best Female	Won	

== Books ==
- Ellis-Bextor, Sophie (7 October 2021). Spinning Plates: Thoughts on Men, Music and Motherhood. Hodder & Stoughton. ISBN 9781529382693.

== Tours ==
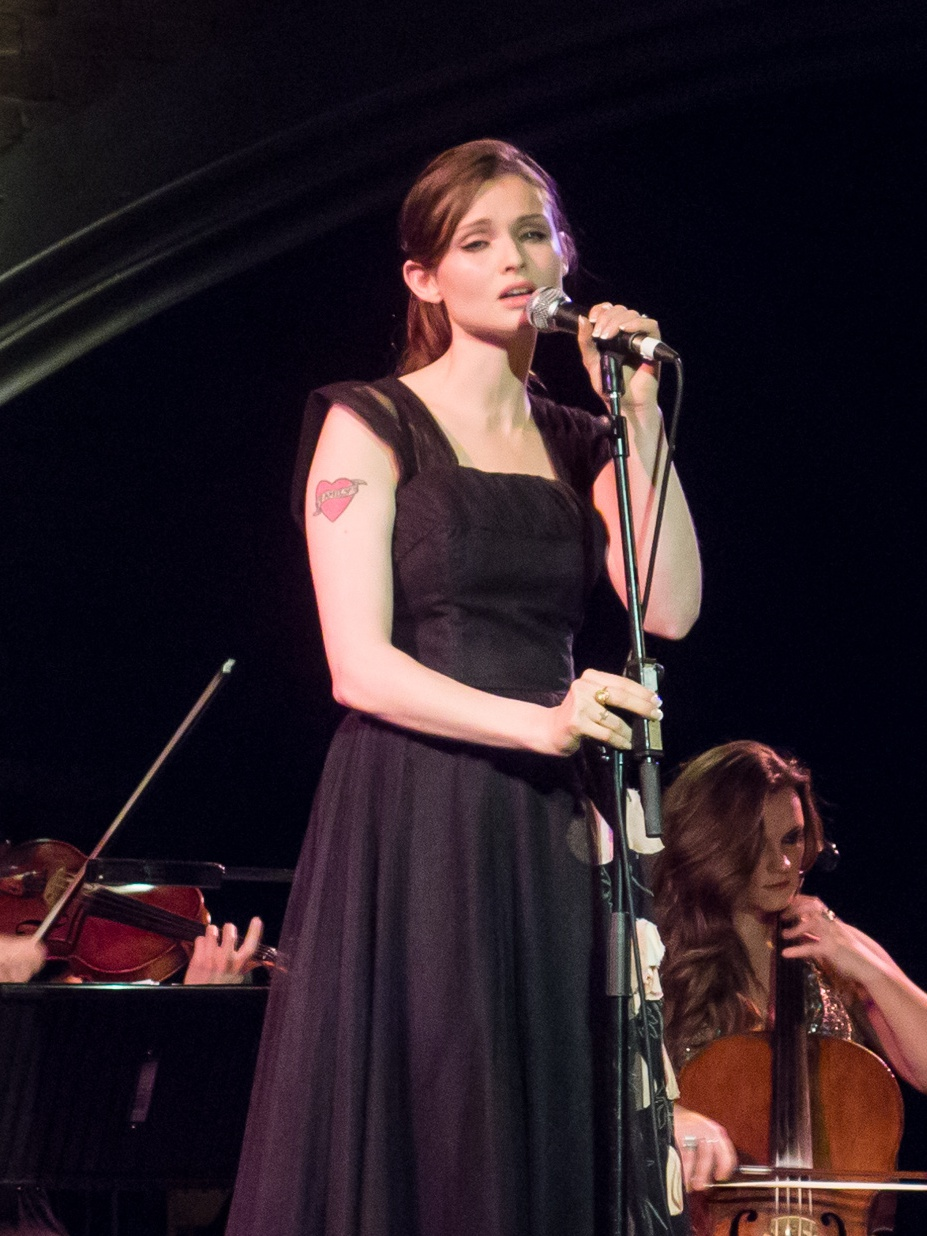
Ellis-Bextor performing in November 2012

- Read My Lips Tour (2002–2003)
- Straight to the Heart Tour (2009–2010)
- Wanderlust Tour (2014)
- Familia Tour (2017)
- The Song Diaries Tour (2019)
- Kitchen Disco Tour (2022–2024)
- North American Tour (May – September 2024)
- 2025 Tour (May - November 2025)
- Perimenopop Tour (2025-2026)

Opening act

- 25 Live (for George Michael) (2006)
- Beautiful World Tour (for Take That) (2007)
- Pandemonium Tour (for Pet Shop Boys) (2010)
- Total Pop! Forest Tour (for Erasure) (2011)
- Summer 2019 (for Kylie Minogue) (2019)
- What the Future Holds Tour (for Steps) (2021)
- The Wild Dreams Tour (for Westlife) (2022)
- This Life on Tour (for Take That) (2024)
