= Too Late to Die Young =

Too Late to Die Young may refer to:

- Too Late to Die Young (album), a 2002 album by Departure Lounge
- Too Late to Die Young (film), a 2018 Chilean drama film
