= Make a Scene =

Studio album by Sophie Ellis-Bextor
- Released: 18 April 2011
- Recorded: 2008–11
- Genres: Dance-pop; house; nu-disco; synth-pop
- Length: 50:06
- Label: EBGB's
- Producers: Fred Ball; Armin van Buuren; Junior Caldera; Julien Carret; Freemasons; Future Cut; Benno de Goeij; Ed Harcourt; Calvin Harris; Liam Howe; Greg Kurstin; Metronomy; Richard X; Richard "Biff" Stannard; Dimitri Tikovoi

Sophie Ellis-Bextor chronology
Sophie Ellis-Bextor: iTunes Live in London (2009)	Make a Scene (2011)	Wanderlust (2014)

Singles from Make a Scene
- 1. "Heartbreak (Make Me a Dancer)" Released: 15 June 2009; 2. "Can't Fight This Feeling" Released: 22 February 2010; 3. "Bittersweet" Released: 3 May 2010; 4. "Not Giving Up on Love" Released: 20 August 2010; 5. "Starlight" Released: 5 June 2011; 6. "Revolution" Released: 27 January 2012

Make a Scene is the fourth studio album by English singer and songwriter Sophie Ellis-Bextor, released in Russia on 18 April 2011 by Universal Music Group and in the United Kingdom on 13 June 2011 by Ellis-Bextor's own record label, EBGB's. Her first release since 2007's Trip the Light Fantastic, the album was originally intended to titled Straight to the Heart, but later switched to its eventual name.

Preceded by two collaboration singles – "Heartbreak (Make Me a Dancer)" in 2009 and "Can't Fight This Feeling" in 2010, its official lead single, "Bittersweet", was released in May 2010 and reached the top ten in both Belgium and Estonia, whilst it reached the top thirty of the singles charts in both the United Kingdom and Scotland. A collaboration with Dutch DJ and musician Armin van Buuren, "Not Giving Up on Love", was released in August 2010 to moderate commercial success, particularly on dance charts, peaking at number three on the Billboard Dance/Mix Show Airplay charts in the United States.

== Background ==
Make a Scene originated from recording sessions for a planned Greatest Hits compilation, which was proposed for release in Autumn 2008. However, the success of recording sessions led Ellis-Bextor and her record label at the time, Fascination Records, to change their plans and record a full studio album instead. The album's lead single, "Heartbreak (Make Me a Dancer)", a collaboration with the Freemasons, was released in June 2009, before a second single, "Can't Fight This Feeling", a collaboration with Junior Caldera, was released in February 2010. The album's third single, "Bittersweet", was released in May 2010, and was the first single from the album to feature only Ellis-Bextor. The album's fourth single, "Not Giving Up on Love", a collaboration with Armin van Buuren, was released in August 2010 and was also included on Buuren's album, Mirage. Following the release of these four singles, Ellis-Bextor parted ways with Fascination, leaving the future of the album hanging in the balance. However, Ellis-Bextor soon announced plans to release the album on her own label, EBGBs, which she had set up in 2002 with her father, Robin Bextor.

The album's title, Make a Scene, was announced in January 2011, despite rumours the album would be named Cut Straight to the Heart, after the final track on the album. This was rather unexpected as Ellis-Bextor had previously criticised title tracks. Later on, "Off & On" had received airplay on NRJ and Europe Plus exclusively in Russia. On 5 June, "Starlight" was released as the album's sixth single overall, exclusively in the United Kingdom, before the album was released a week later on 12 June. In 2012 "Revolution" was released as the album's seventh and final single overall but, unlike the majority of the singles, it was an international release.

== Composition ==
Make a Scene features production by Fred Ball, Armin van Buuren, Junior Caldera, Julien Carret, Freemasons, Ed Harcourt, Calvin Harris, Greg Kurstin, Liam Howe, Metronomy, Richard Stannard, Dimitri Tikovoi, and Richard X. According to Clixie Music, on the opening track "Revolution", Ellis-Bextor has been said to utilise catchy repetition and deliver a sweet vocal with "commanding vocals". It was described as "a heavily energetic and impressive opener that defines the overall mood." Following the opener is the third single "Bittersweet" and the electropop "Off & On", which Clixie elaborated on as having an early 1980s disco sound. It was written by Scottish DJ Calvin Harris and Irish singer Róisín Murphy and was originally recorded with Murphy on vocals for Murphy's 2007 studio album Overpowered, but was omitted from the final track listing. Both "Not Giving Up on Love" and "Can't Fight This Feeling" have been called anthems by Clixie Music, as well as "international smash singles". "Starlight" was also said to feature a "soothing" vocal delivery by Ellis-Bextor, with a "very '80s-esque twist." "Magic" is a dance music-driven track and was called "enjoyable" due to its employment of harmonic vocals. Finally, "Synchronised" and "Cut Straight to the Heart" were talked about as focussing on Sophie's vocals, and noted as being "a lot more relaxed" in comparison to the rest of the album.

== Critical reception ==
Professional ratings
Aggregate scores
Source	Rating
Metacritic	53/100
Review scores
Source	Rating
AllMusic	3/5 stars
BBC Music	negative
The Daily Telegraph	2/5 stars
Digital Spy	4/5 stars
The Guardian	2/5 stars
The Mirror	3/5 stars
NME	2/10
Yahoo! Music	8/10 stars

Make a Scene received mixed reviews from music critics. At Metacritic, which assigns a rating out of 100 to reviews from mainstream critics, the album received an average score of 53, based on 7 reviews. While reviewing some songs on the album, Robbie Daw from Idolator said that "after taking in small handful of singles, it sounds like there's even better material lying in wait on Make a Scene". Daw called the Richard X productions "Starlight" and "Magic" "amazing". Lee Bradshaw from Clixie Music rated it eight stars out of ten, labeling it "her most dance-filled release" and praised Ellis-Bextor for having "out-done herself on this one", stating that "she has definitely provided an album with great future potential." Robert Copsey from Digital Spy was positive, rating it four stars out of five, opining that the "wistful pop-ballads 'Starlight' and 'Synchronised' prov[e] that she is more than capable of handling the centre stage if she so chooses. It might be a scene of two halves, but there's no shortage of elegance, class and pop sensibilities throughout."

Caroline Sullivan from The Guardian rated it two stars out of five and concluded that "The bulk of the record is shopping-mall pop that was probably expensive to make, but sounds depressingly cheap." Matt Wilkinson from NME was negative, rating it two stars out of ten, commenting that "Make a Scene sees her straddle a multitude of different genres". Gavin Martin from The Mirror was positive, feeling that the album is a "jolly effective blend of high-bred hoofing, fun and sincerity." James Lachno from The Daily Telegraph judged that "A legion of co-producers attempt to recreate the slick dance-pop for which she is famed, but too often her husky voice and arch delivery are given short shrift by bloated house beats and perfunctory hooks." Alex Hall from The Tune was positive, saying that "Make a Scene is by no means a 'dark' record; however, Sophie Ellis-Bextor manages to prevent what would have been an unbearable 50 minutes had every song been a reproduction of 'Starlight' by applying to the crevasses all the insight she's gained in a decade." Gay Times also gave a positive review, calling it "a proper pop album...easily head and shoulders above the offerings from her contemporaries in the last year".

== Commercial performance ==
Make a Scene entered the UK Albums Chart at number thirty-three with first-week sales of 6,143 copies, and by January 2014, it had sold 13,716 copies in the United Kingdom. Within three months of release, the album received a gold certification in Russia, denoting sales in excess of 5,000 copies. In spite of the album's lack of success, its singles became top 30 hits in the UK and Europe.

== Track listing ==
Make a Scene – Standard edition
No.	Title	Writer(s)	Producer(s)	Length
1.	"Revolution"	Sophie Ellis-Bextor; Greg Kurstin; Cathy Dennis	Kurstin	2:44
2.	"Bittersweet"	Ellis-Bextor; Hannah Robinson; Russell Small; Richard Stannard; James Wiltshire	Freemasons; Stannard	3:27
3.	"Off & On"	Calvin Harris; Dennis; Róisín Murphy	Harris	3:32
4.	"Heartbreak (Make Me a Dancer)" (Freemasons featuring Sophie Ellis-Bextor)	Ellis-Bextor; Wiltshire; Small; Stannard	Freemasons; Stannard	3:25
5.	"Not Giving Up on Love" (versus Armin van Buuren)	Ellis-Bextor; van Buuren; Benno de Goeij; Olivia Nervo; Miriam Nervo	Buuren; Goeij	2:56
6.	"Can't Fight This Feeling" (Junior Caldera featuring Sophie Ellis-Bextor)	Ellis-Bextor; Julien Carret; Caldera	Caldera; Carret	3:35
7.	"Starlight"	Ellis-Bextor; Richard X; Robinson	Richard X	4:20
8.	"Under Your Touch"	Ellis-Bextor; Liam Howe; Robinson	Howe	3:53
9.	"Make a Scene"	Ellis-Bextor; Joseph Mount	Future Cut; Metronomy	3:50
10.	"Magic"	Ellis-Bextor; Richard X; Robinson	Richard X	4:34
11.	"Dial My Number"	Ellis-Bextor; Howe; Robinson	Howe	3:37
12.	"Homewrecker"	Ellis-Bextor; Kurstin; Lindy Robbins	Kurstin	3:25
13.	"Synchronised"	Fred Ball; Ina Wroldsen	Ball	3:12
14.	"Cut Straight to the Heart"	Ellis-Bextor; Ed Harcourt; Dimitri Tikovoi	Harcourt; Tikovoi	3:37

Make a Scene – Italian iTunes Store bonus track
No.	Title	Writer(s)	Producer(s)	Length
15.	"Starlight" (My Doctor Elvis Remix)	Ellis-Bextor; Richard X; Robinson	Richard X	5:52

Make a Scene – reissue edition
No.	Title	Writer(s)	Producer(s)	Length
15.	"Sophia Loren"	Chris Rojas; Dennis; Ellis-Bextor	Rojas	4:16
16.	"Dear Jimmy" (unmixed version)	Ellis-Bextor; Matt Prime; Hannah Robinson	Prime	3:27

Notes

- The iTunes store version includes the music videos to "Bittersweet", "Heartbreak (Make Me a Dancer)", "Not Giving Up on Love", "Can't Fight This Feeling" and "Starlight".

== Personnel ==
Credits adapted from the liner notes of Make a Scene.

- Sophie Ellis-Bextor – vocals
- Fred Ball – keyboards, production, programming (track 13)
- Andy Bradfield – mixing (track 14)
- Armin van Buuren – production (track 5)
- Junior Caldera – instruments, mixing, production (track 6)
- Julien Carret – mixing, production (track 6)
- Cathy Dennis – backing vocals, vocal production (track 3)
- Richard Edgeler – assistant mixing (track 13)
- Ben Epstein – guitar (track 13)
- Steve Fitzmaurice – mixing (track 9)
- Future Cut – production (track 9)
- Benno de Goeij – production (track 5)
- Ed Harcourt – piano, production, string arrangement, string conducting, synths (track 14)
- Calvin Harris – arrangement, instruments, production (track 3)
- Marianne Haynes – violin (track 14)
- Pete Hofmann – mixing (tracks 7, 10)
- Louise Hogan – viola (track 14)
- Liam Howe – production (tracks 8, 11); mixing (track 11)
- Ash Howes – mixing (tracks 2, 3); additional engineering (track 4)
- Jordan Jay – A&R (track 5)
- Greg Kurstin – keyboards, production, programming (tracks 1, 12); engineering, guitar, mixing (track 12)
- George Lambert – mastering (track 4)
- Amy Langley – cello (track 14)
- Gita Langley – violin (track 14)
- Rosie Langley – violin (track 14)
- Mike Marsh – mastering
- Metronomy – production (track 9)
- Joseph Mount – producer (track 9)
- Miriam Nervo – backing vocals, vocal production (track 5)
- Olivia Nervo – backing vocals, vocal production (track 5)
- Emile Ogoo – bass guitar (track 13)
- Rob Orton – mixing (track 8)
- Richard X – production (tracks 7, 10)
- Hannah Robinson – backing vocals (tracks 2, 7, 8, 10, 11)
- Russell Small – production (tracks 2, 4); keyboards, programming (track 2); mixing, percussion (track 4)
- Amy Stanford – viola (track 14)
- Ellie Stanford – violin (track 14)
- Richard "Biff" Stannard – production (tracks 2, 4); keyboards, programming (track 2); additional programming (track 4)
- Brio Taliaferro – additional programming (track 13)
- Dimitri Tikovoi – production (track 14)
- Jeremy Wheatley – mixing (track 13)
- Richard Wilkinson – engineering (tracks 8, 11)
- Harriet Wiltshire – cello (track 14)
- James Wiltshire – keyboards, production, programming (tracks 2, 4); mixing (track 4)
- Jeremy Yeremian – mixing (track 6)
- Chris Young – vocal engineering (track 5)

== Charts ==
=== Weekly charts ===
Chart (2011)	Peak position
Russian Albums (M2)	12
Scottish Albums (Official Charts)	47
UK Albums (Official Charts)	33
UK Independent Albums (Official Charts)	8

=== Year-end charts ===
Chart (2011)	Position
Russian Albums Chart	40

== Certifications ==
Region	Certification	Certified units/sales
Russia (NFPF)	Gold	5,000^{*}
^{*} Sales figures based on certification alone.

== Release history ==
Region	Date	Label(s)	Format(s)	Ref.
Russia	18 April 2011	Universal Music	CD; digital download	
Germany	12 June 2011	EBGB's; Alive	Digital download	
United Kingdom	12 June 2011	EBGB's	Digital download	
Poland	13 June 2011	Mystic Production	CD; digital download	
United Kingdom	13 June 2011	EBGB's	CD	
Germany	17 June 2011	EBGB's; Alive	CD	
Australia	30 September 2011	Shock Entertainment	CD; digital download	
Italy	18 October 2011	EGO Music; Universal Music	Digital download	
Italy	25 October 2011	EGO Music; Universal Music	CD	
United States	16 October 2012	Essential Music	Digital download	
Mexico	16 October 2012	Essential Music; +Mas Label; Universal Music	CD; digital download	
