= Perimenopop Tour =

2026 concert tour by Sophie Ellis-Bextor

- Tour by Sophie Ellis-Bextor
- Promotional poster for the tour
- Location: Oceania
- Associated album: Perimenopop
- Start date: February 3, 2026
- End date: February 13, 2026
- Legs: 1
- No. of shows: 7
- Supporting act: Holiday Sidewinder

The Perimenopop Tour was a concert tour by English singer-songwriter Sophie Ellis-Bextor, held in February 2026 in support of her album Perimenopop. The tour included headline performances in New Zealand, followed by dates in Australia.

== Background ==
In late 2025, Sophie Ellis-Bextor announced the release of her eighth studio album, Perimenopop, and began performing new material as part of its promotional cycle. In September 2025, Sophie Ellis-Bextor announced a series of headline tour dates across Australia in February 2026, with the Australian leg scheduled to begin at the Forum in Melbourne on 6 February 2026, followed by shows in Sydney, Brisbane and Perth. Around the same time, it was confirmed that Ellis-Bextor would also perform in New Zealand in early February 2026, with shows scheduled at the Waikato Regional Theatre in Hamilton on 3 February and at the James Hay Theatre in Christchurch on 4 February.

The Australian and New Zealand shows were promoted as energetic live performances showcasing Sophie Ellis-Bextor’s disco-pop repertoire and celebrating her Perimenopop album, bringing her glossy dance-floor classics and new material to audiences in the region, and a return to international touring outside Europe and the United Kingdom.

== Tour dates ==
List of 2026 concerts
Date	City	Country	Venue	Supporting act	Attendance
3 February	Christchurch	New Zealand	James Hay Theatre	Ella Monnery	-
4 February	Hamilton	New Zealand	BNZ Theatre	Ella Monnery	-
6 February	Melbourne	Australia	Forum Theatre	Holiday Sidewinder	-
7 February	Sydney	Australia	The Roundhouse	Holiday Sidewinder	-
8 February	Carrick	Australia	Party in the Paddock	-	14,000
10 February	Brisbane	Australia	The Tivoli	Holiday Sidewinder	-
12 February	Perth	Australia	Ice Cream Factory	-	-
