= Off & On =

Single by Sophie Ellis-Bextor

from the album Make a Scene
- Released: 11 April 2011
- Recorded: 2009–10
- Genre: Synth-pop; dance-pop
- Length: 3:32
- Label: Universal
- Songwriters: Calvin Harris; Cathy Dennis; Róisín Murphy
- Producers: Calvin Harris; Cathy Dennis

Sophie Ellis-Bextor singles chronology
"Not Giving Up on Love" (2010)	"Off & On" (2011)	"Starlight" (2011)

Audio
- "Off & On" on YouTube

"Off & On" is a pop song released by British singer Sophie Ellis-Bextor as the fifth overall single from her fourth studio album, Make a Scene (2011). Written by Scottish DJ Calvin Harris, English songwriter Cathy Dennis and Irish musician Róisín Murphy, it was released on 11 April 2011, exclusively in the Russian Federation as a digital download, a week before the release of the album there. It received airplay exclusively in Russia. Ellis-Bextor appeared on various talk shows in the United Kingdom to promote the song, including The Rob Brydon Show, despite it not being released as a single there.

== Background ==
"Off & On" was produced by Calvin Harris. The song was penned with songwriter Cathy Dennis, and was first recorded by Irish singer Róisín Murphy for her album Overpowered; however, it was cut from the final track list. It was then offered to Ellis-Bextor, who subsequently recorded her own version. Of the song, Ellis-Bextor stated: "Ordinarily I'm a bit squeamish about taking on songs that I didn't write. But I think you've always got to think that you can bring something to it." A demo version was added to Ellis-Bextor's MySpace in July 2008, alongside "Heartbreak (Make Me a Dancer)". The single was exclusively released in the Russian Federation, a week prior to the release of the album there.

== Charts ==
Chart (2011)	Peak position
CIS Airplay (TopHit)	49
Russia Airplay (TopHit)	45

== Versions ==
1. Off And On (Róisín Murphy's Version) – 3:30
2. Off & On (Sophie Ellis-Bextor's Demo) – 3:15
3. Off & On (Sophie Ellis-Bextor's Final Version) – 3:33
4. Off & On (Calvin Harris Remix) – 3:51
5. Off And On (Róisín Murphy and Sophie Ellis-Bextor Mashup) – 3:31
