= Out of Here (Departure Lounge album) =

Studio album by Departure Lounge
- Released: 1999
- Label: Meek Giant

Out Of Here is an album by Tim Keegan and Departure Lounge, released on Keegan's Meek Giant label in 2000.

== Track listing ==
1. "Music for Pleasure"
2. "The New You"
3. "Slow News Day"
4. "Disconnected"
5. "Win Them Back"
6. "Save Me from Happiness"
7. "Postcard from a Friend"
8. "Johnny A"
9. "Stay on the Line"
10. "We've Got Everything We Need"
11. "1911999"
