= Too Late to Die Young (album) =

Too Late To Die Young

Studio album by Departure Lounge
- Released: 25 November 2002
- Genre: Alternative rock
- Label: Bella Union

Professional ratings
Review scores
Source	Rating
Allmusic	3/5 stars

Too Late to Die Young is an album by Departure Lounge, released in 2002 on Bella Union Records. It was the band's third and last album. The album was produced by French DJ and remixer Kid Loco.

== Track listing ==
1. "Straight Line to the Kerb"
2. "What You Have Is Good"
3. "King Kong Frown"
4. "I Love You"
5. "Alone Again And..."
6. "Tubular Belgians in My Goldfield"
7. "Be Good to Yourself"
8. "Over the Side"
9. "Coke and Flakes"
10. "Silverline"
11. "Animals on My Mind"

== Credits ==
- Producer - Kid Loco
- Engineer – Nick Hannan
- Assistant engineer – Pete Collis
- Mix - Kid Loco, Nick Hannan
