= Pleasure (Norwegian band) =

Norwegian musical group

Pleasure is a Norwegian pop band, led by Fred Ball. Their eponymous album, released in 2003, featured a song "Don't Look The Other Way" with Justine Frischmann (former lead singer for Elastica) on vocals. The follow-up album Pleasure 2 spent two weeks on the Norwegian album chart in August and September 2007, peaking at number 22.

== Discography ==
Pleasure 1 (August 8, 2003)

1. "Don't Look the Other Way"
2. "From the Country to the City"
3. "All I Want"
4. "Stories"
5. "Memory"
6. "Sensitivity"
7. "You Got to Love Someone"
8. "I'm Confused"
9. "Disco Doctor"
10. "Visionary"

Pleasure 2 (unknown, 2007)

1. "Intro"
2. "Alright All Night"
3. "Out of Love"
4. "Throw It All Away"
5. "Back to You"
6. "Uptown"
7. "Bite the Beat"
8. "Silk Dream"
9. "Eskimo Kiss"
10. "Finest Thing"
11. "NYCSC"
12. "Nightvision"
