= Can't Fight This Feeling (Junior Caldera song) =

Single by Junior Caldera featuring Sophie Ellis-Bextor

from the album Début and Make a Scene
- Released: 22 February 2010
- Recorded: 2009
- Genre: Nu disco
- Length: 3:40
- Label: Fascination; Polydor Records France
- Songwriters: Sophie Ellis-Bextor; Junior Caldera; Roselyn Della Sabina; Julien Carret
- Producer: Junior Caldera

Junior Caldera singles chronology
"What You Get" (2009)	"Can't Fight this Feeling" (2010)	"A Little Bit More" (2010)

Sophie Ellis-Bextor singles chronology
"Heartbreak (Make Me a Dancer)" (2009)	"Can't Fight this Feeling" (2010)	"Bittersweet" (2010)

Audio
- "Can't Fight This Feeling" on YouTube

"Can't Fight This Feeling" is a song written by Junior Caldera, Sophie Ellis-Bextor and Roselyn Della Sabina, and produced by Junior Caldera for his first album, Début, released in 2009. It was released as the album's fourth single in February 2010. It was also the second single from Ellis-Bextor's fourth studio album, Make A Scene. The single was released in France prior to the release of Ellis-Bextor following single, "Bittersweet". The video for the song was shot in Paris on 10 March 2010. It was believed that Roselyn Della Sabina stopped writing for Madonna to complete this song. The single was released in Australia on 26 March 2011.

== Track listing ==
- Digital Download - The Remixes Part 1
1. "Can't Fight this Feeling" (Radio Edit)
2. "Can't Fight this Feeling" (Junior Moonlight Remix)
3. "Can't Fight this Feeling" (Mischa Daniels Radio Edit)
4. "Can't Fight this Feeling" (Soundshakerz Radio Edit)
5. "Can't Fight this Feeling" (Junior Caldera Remix Radio Edit)
- Digital Download - The Remixes Part 2
1. "Can't Fight this Feeling" (Original Mix)
2. "Can't Fight this Feeling" (Soulshakerz Club Extended Mix)
3. "Can't Fight this Feeling" (Avicii Universe Mix)
4. "Can't Fight this Feeling" (Junior Caldera Remix)
5. "Can't Fight this Feeling" (Mischa Daniels Original Mix)
- CD Single
1. "Can't Fight this Feeling" (Album Version) – 3:35
2. "Can't Fight this Feeling" (Junior Caldera Remix Radio Edit) – 3:49
3. "Can't Fight this Feeling" (Soundshakerz Radio Edit) – 3:58
4. "Can't Fight this Feeling" (Avicii Universe Mix) – 6:42
- Maxi Single
1. "Can't Fight this Feeling" (Avicii Universe Mix) – 6:42
2. "Can't Fight this Feeling" (Original Mix)
3. "Can't Fight this Feeling" (Soundshakerz Radio Edit) – 3:58
4. "Can't Fight this Feeling" (Soulshakerz Club Mix) - 7:31
5. "Can't Fight this Feeling" (Junior Caldera Remix Radio Edit) – 3:49
6. "Can't Fight this Feeling" (Junior Caldera Club Mix) – 5:42
7. "Can't Fight this Feeling" (Mischa Daniels Original Mix) - 6:53
8. "Can't Fight this Feeling" (Junior Moonlight Remix) - 3:03

== Charts ==
=== Weekly charts ===
2010–11 Weekly chart performance for "Can't Fight This Feeling"
Chart (2010–2011)	Peak position
CIS Airplay (TopHit)	1
European Hot 100 Singles (Billboard)	37
France (SNEP)	13
France Digital Singles (SNEP)	30
Latvia (European Hit Radio)	17
Poland Airplay (ZPAV)	1
Poland (Dance Top 50)	20
Poland (Video Chart)	1
Poland (Polish Airplay New)	2
Russia Airplay (TopHit)	1
Slovakia (IFPI)	96
Ukraine Airplay (TopHit)	24

2015 Weekly chart performance for "Can't Fight This Feeling"
Chart (2015)	Peak position
Ukraine Airplay (TopHit)	182

2016 Weekly chart performance for "Can't Fight This Feeling"
Chart (2016)	Peak position
Ukraine Airplay (TopHit)	115

2017 Weekly chart performance for "Can't Fight This Feeling"
Chart (2017)	Peak position
Ukraine Airplay (TopHit)	116

2023 Weekly chart performance for "Can't Fight This Feeling"
Chart (2023)	Peak position
Estonia Airplay (TopHit)	162

=== Monthly charts ===
2010 Monthly chart performance for "Can't Fight This Feeling"
Chart (2010)	Peak position
CIS Airplay (TopHit)	2
Russia Airplay (TopHit)	2
Ukraine Airplay (TopHit)	28

=== Year-end charts ===
2010 year-end chart performance for "Can't Fight This Feeling"
Chart (2010)	Position
CIS Airplay (TopHit)	14
Russia Airplay (TopHit)	15
Ukraine Airplay (TopHit)	64

2011 year-end chart performance for "Can't Fight This Feeling"
Chart (2011)	Position
CIS Airplay (TopHit)	190
Russia Airplay (TopHit)	190

== Release history ==
Region	Date	Format
France	22 February 2010	Digital download
France	12 April 2010	CD single
Europe	1 March 2010	Digital download
Europe	1 March 2010	Airplay
United Kingdom	7 November 2010	Digital download^{[A]}
Australia	26 March 2011	Digital download

Notes

- A Released as part of the Clubland 18 compilation. Available to purchase on iTunes.
