= I Won't Change You =

2003 single by Sophie Ellis-Bextor

Single by Sophie Ellis-Bextor

from the album Shoot from the Hip
- B-side: "Yes Sir, I Can Boogie"
- Released: 29 December 2003
- Length: 3:40
- Label: Polydor
- Songwriters: Sophie Ellis-Bextor; Gregg Alexander; Matt Rowe
- Producers: Gregg Alexander; Matt Rowe

Sophie Ellis-Bextor singles chronology
"Mixed Up World" (2003)	"I Won't Change You" (2003)	"Circles (Just My Good Time)" (2005)

Alternative cover
- UK CD2

Music video
- "I Won't Change You" on YouTube

"I Won't Change You" is a song by the English singer-songwriter Sophie Ellis-Bextor, from her second album, Shoot from the Hip (2003). Written by Ellis-Bextor, Gregg Alexander and Matt Rowe, it was released on 29 December 2003 as the second and final single from the album. It debuted and peaked at number nine on the UK Singles Chart, selling 34,000 copies.

== Music video ==
When the music video was filmed, Sophie was pregnant. The video features Ellis-Bextor speed dating, changing her looks multiple times to attract a partner. First, she wears a brown wig consisting of a part down the middle of her head and a ponytail on either side, after a second round with the same man, merely taking off her gold trenchcoat to reveal a tight-fitting black dress underneath. She looks like an informal, yet sophisticated red-headed woman. Progressively, she then becomes a black-haired woman, the hair being short, full and curly. After staring into her drink, which suspectingly turns bright blue, she is seen dancing with the man who she continuously changes for, in a blue dress and a Marilyn Monroe-esque blonde wig. Finally, we see her in a black headscarf with long wavy blonde hair. All the while, she is singing to the same man, who finds this night of speed dating an escalating amusement and she eventually ends up in his arms, with editing techniques changing which "Sophie" is in his arms. Throughout the video, there are scenes of Sophie in the bathroom in her original look singing to the mirror and changing outfits in a stall. The video was directed and co-produced by Sophie Muller.

== Track listings ==
UK CD1

1. "I Won't Change You" – 3:43
2. "I Won't Change You" (Solaris vocal mix) – 7:43
3. "Yes Sir, I Can Boogie" – 3:59
4. "I Won't Change You" (CD-ROM video)

UK CD2

1. "I Won't Change You" – 3:43
2. "Murder on the Dancefloor" (Phunk Investigation vocal mix) – 8:35

European maxi-CD single

1. "I Won't Change You" – 3:43
2. "Murder on the Dancefloor" (Phunk Investigation vocal mix) – 8:35
3. "Yes Sir, I Can Boogie" – 3:59

== Charts ==
Chart (2004)	Peak position
Belgium (Ultratip Bubbling Under Flanders)	11
Belgium (Ultratip Bubbling Under Wallonia)	3
Germany (GfK)	80
Hungary (Dance Top 40)	31
Hungary (Editors' Choice Top 40)	26
Ireland (IRMA)	40
Romania (Romanian Top 100)	49
Scottish Singles Sales (Official Charts)	13
UK Singles (Official Charts)	9

== Sales ==
Region	Certification	Certified units/sales
United Kingdom	—	34,000

== Release history ==
Region	Date	Format(s)	Label(s)	Ref.
United Kingdom	29 December 2003	CD	Polydor	
Australia	9 February 2004	CD	Polydor	
