= Bittersweet (Sophie Ellis-Bextor song) =

Single by Sophie Ellis-Bextor

from the album Make a Scene
- B-side: "Sophia Loren"
- Released: 3 May 2010
- Recorded: 2009
- Genre: Nu-disco, house, dance-pop
- Length: 3:26
- Label: Fascination, Polydor, Armada Music
- Songwriters: Sophie Ellis-Bextor, James Wiltshire, Russell Small, Richard Stannard, Hannah Robinson
- Producers: Freemasons, Biffco

Sophie Ellis-Bextor singles chronology
"Can't Fight this Feeling" (2010)	"Bittersweet" (2010)	"Not Giving Up on Love" (2010)

Music video
- "Sophie Ellis Bextor - Bittersweet (Official Music Video)" on YouTube

"Bittersweet" is a song by British singer Sophie Ellis-Bextor, released as the third single from her fourth album Make a Scene (2011). Written by Ellis-Bextor, James Wiltshire, Russell Small, Richard Stannard and Hannah Robinson, and produced by the Freemasons and Biffco, it was released on 3 May 2010, following two singles on which Ellis-Bextor collaborated, that also appear on Make a Scene.

Lyrically, Ellis–Bextor said the song was about the inability to "resist something that you know is bad for you". Critical reception to "Bittersweet" was mixed, with Fraser McAlpine from the BBC highlighting similarities to "Untouchable" by girl band Girls Aloud. McAlpine claimed that realising a song with such similarities was "risky" given the lack of success "Untouchable" experienced, claiming that it was "odd that Sophie would choose to go to a similar place and expect a different result".

Despite mixed reception from music critics, commercially, the song performed reasonably, peaking at number 25 on the UK Singles Charts and number 30 on the Scottish Singles Charts. Elsewhere, it peaked at number 3 in Belgium, 6 in Estonia and 38 in Hungary. In 2024, the Official Charts Company had "Bittersweet" as the 13th best–selling song by Ellis Bextor in the United Kingdom.

== Background ==
"Bittersweet" was premiered on the radio station Gaydar on 8 March 2010, and its video premiered on 23 March 2010 on Popjustice. The first live performance of "Bittersweet" took place at the Little World Festival in Méribel, France, on 17 March 2010. The song's B-side, "Sophia Loren", was, for a time, going to be the album's lead single; these plans were scrapped. It was written by Ellis-Bextor, Cathy Dennis and Chris Rojas, and produced by Rojas.

== Critical reception ==
Critical reception to "Bittersweet" was positive. Popjustice declared it to be "completely above-average" and "pretty much the complete opposite of a crap pop record." "Bittersweet" was also favourably reviewed by Digital Spy and The New York Post. Digital Spy gave 5 stars to "Bittersweet", reviewing: "Last year's 'Heartbreak (Make Me A Dancer)' was a bona fide dancefloor delight, so it's little wonder that Sophie Ellis-Bextor (...) has teamed up with the Freemasons again for the first single from her upcoming fourth album. However, 'Bittersweet' is no twin sister to 'Heartbreak' (...) It's a big spangly club thumper with a pleasing hint of the '80s to it – the pop equivalent of that surprisingly elegant sequinned boob tube at the back of your mum's wardrobe."

BBC Radio 1 gave "Bittersweet" 3 stars out of 5, stating "that voice is kind of striking, for a kick off: frosty and cold on the outside, but boiling with passion underneath. She's an anti-arctic roll, throatally speaking. And while there's no doubt as to her beauty and charm, she also looks a bit like an oil painting which has miraculously come to life. Lovely to look at, but somehow troubling too. These are all plus points, by the way". The review also makes a comparison to Girls Aloud's top 20 hit "Untouchable": "It's not that the two songs are so similar you can't tell them apart, but there's enough similarity there that a seasoned chartwatcher could probably predict what kind of reception one song would get, based on the success of the other. 'Untouchable' having been a relative disappointment for the Girls girls, just as they were riding off the back of their best single ever (...) it seems odd that Sophie would choose to go to a similar place and expect a different result."

The Guardian made the song "Pick of the Week", and gave it 5 stars, stating that "Sophie Ellis-Bextor should seem rather old-fashioned in these days of Ke$ha sicking up her lunch in Paris Hilton's wardrobe and Gaga strapping 20 B&H on her face, but while faces come and go, tunes like this skyscraping electro disco-pop blockbuster never fall out of vogue. If you can't handle her fantastically nonchalant warbletones you're better off making a cup of tea for the tune's duration; but also think about where your life's headed because the signs, frankly, are not good". The single has been nominated for the 2010s Popjustice £20 Music Prize, coming in 3rd place in the finals. It also came in 14th position in the Popjustice Top 45 Singles of 2010.

== Music video ==
The video for the song was filmed in London, United Kingdom on 12 March. It was directed by Chris Sweeney. The video premiered on 23 March on Popjustice's website. It shows Sophie in a bright studio and jumping in slow motion while flower petals and paint is throw to her and her dancers. Another music video was re-released but this time including a remixed version of the video and the song, remix courtesy by Freemasons, this video was premiered at Armada Music's website.

== Track listing ==
- UK CD single
1. "Bittersweet" – 3:26
2. "Sophia Loren" (Ellis-Bextor, Cathy Dennis, Chris Rojas) – 4:15
- 7" picture disc
1. "Bittersweet" – 3:26
2. "Bittersweet" (Freemasons Radio Mix) – 3:34
- Digital download
1. "Bittersweet" – 3:26
2. "Bittersweet" (Freemasons Club Mix) – 5:05
3. "Bittersweet" (Jodie Harsh Extended Remix) – 6:32
4. "Bittersweet" (Freemasons Radio Mix) – 3:34
5. "Bittersweet" (Freemasons Extended Club Mix) – 8:55

== Official remixes ==
1. "Bittersweet" (Freemasons Club Mix) – 5:05
2. "Bittersweet" (Freemasons Radio Mix) – 3:34
3. "Bittersweet" (Freemasons Extended Club Mix) – 8:55
4. "Bittersweet" (Freemasons Dub) – 7:57
5. "Bittersweet" (Freemasons Radio Mix) – 3:34
6. "Bittersweet" (Jodie Harsh Club Mix) – 6:32
7. "Bittersweet" (Jodie Harsh Dub) – 6:36
8. "Bittersweet" (Jodie Harsh Radio Mix) – 3:38

== Chart performance ==
Chart (2010)	Peak position
Belgium Wallonia Ultratip	3
Estonia Top 40 Airplay Chart	6
Hungary (Editors' Choice Top 40)	38
Scotland (OCC)	30
Slovakia Top 100 Airplay Chart	18
United Kingdom (OCC)	25

== Release history ==
Region	Date	Format
Australia	20 February 2010	Club scene
Ireland	30 April 2010	Digital download
Ireland	30 April 2010	CD single
United Kingdom	8 March 2010	Airplay
United Kingdom	2 May 2010	Digital download
United Kingdom	3 May 2010	CD single, 7" single
Spain	10 May 2010	Digital download
Benelux	10 June 2011	Digital download

== Live performances ==
- Little World Festival, Méribel, France – 17 March 2010
- The Album Chart Show – 15 April 2010
- GMTV film piece at Selfridges – 20 April 2010
- MTV Dance Take Over show – 24 April 2010
- Something for the Weekend – 25 April 2010
- Good Times – 26 April 2010
- GMTV – 29 April 2010
- 4Music's The Crush – 1 May 2010
- G-A-Y – 1 May 2010
- The Beat (BBC Radio show) – 2 May 2010
- Loose Women – 5 May 2010
- G-A-Y – 5 May 2010
- Live from Studio Five – 7 May 2010
- Saturday Kitchen – 8 May 2010
- Koko Pop – 8 May 2010
- Frock Me – 15 May 2010
- Orsay Fashion Show, Warsaw, Poland – 19 May 2010
- Efes Pilsen One Love Festival, Istanbul, Turkey – 20 June 2010
