= Starlight (Sophie Ellis-Bextor song) =

Single by Sophie Ellis-Bextor

from the album Make a Scene
- Released: 5 June 2011
- Recorded: 2009
- Genre: Synthpop; dance-pop
- Length: 4:22; 3:30 (radio edit)
- Label: EBGB's
- Songwriters: Sophie Ellis-Bextor; Richard X; Hannah Robinson
- Producer: Richard X

Sophie Ellis-Bextor singles chronology
"Off & On" (2011)	"Starlight" (2011)	"Fuck with You" (2012)

Music video
- "Starlight" (official video) on YouTube

"Starlight" is a pop song released by British singer-songwriter Sophie Ellis-Bextor as the sixth overall single from her fourth studio album, Make a Scene. It was written by Ellis-Bextor, Hannah Robinson and its producer Richard X. The song was released on 5 June 2011, in the United Kingdom as a digital download, a week before the release of the album. Ellis-Bextor appeared on various talk shows to promote the single prior to its release. The song also served as the lead single in Australia and Italy, released on 23 September 2011 a week ahead of the album release there. It's her first single as an independent artist with her label EBGB's.

== Background ==
"Starlight" was produced by Richard X. Sophie Ellis-Bextor described the song as: "A perfect chilled dance anthem that is instantly catchy with a soft but edgy beat. It is a track that can easily take you from sun lounger by day to nightclub by evening and is the perfect summer anthem." Digital Spy gave the track 4 out of 5 stars, writing: "'Hold a moment in time/ and look to the skies,' Sophie Ellis-Bextor muses on the opening line to her new single 'Starlight'. We'd never have pegged her as a believer in the signs of the Zodiac, but after consulting our manual, Sophie – an Aries – is described as having an adventurous and outgoing personality, with 'a wonderful ability to bounce back'. Given that her last single missed the Top 100 by some considerable margin, we can only hope such character traits are in fact true. "'No silhouette in my mind/ It's just you and I,' she enunciates over simmering synths and '80s-flecked electronic beats as she sings about losing yourself – elegantly, we might add – in the moment. 'We are one/ Find us under the starlight/ 'Cause tonight we found heaven in the dark,' she continues. The result is a twinkly disco-pop ballad built for al fresco slow-dancing on a summer's evening, delivered the only way Sophie knows how – with utmost sophistication."

"Starlight" had a physical release in Italy on 25 October. The dance label EGO Music published an EP containing several new remixes of the song.

== Music video ==
The music video was directed by Robin Bextor and filmed during the concert at the O2 Academy Oxford. It shows Sophie singing and dancing on stage as well as some landscapes at dawn, sunset and night. The video uses the radio edit of the song.

== Track listing ==
- Digital download
1. "Starlight" – 4:22
2. "Starlight" (radio edit) – 3:30
3. "Starlight" (Carl Hanaghan Remix) – 7:37
- Starlight Remixes EP (Italy)
1. "Starlight" – 4:22
2. "Starlight" (My Doctor Elvis Remix) – 5:53
3. "Starlight" (The Cube Guys Remix) – 7:09
4. "Starlight" (Outwork Remix) – 6:18
5. "Starlight" (Fuzzy Hair Remix) – 6:07
6. "Starlight" (Stefano Mattara Remix) – 6:47
7. "Starlight" (Gianni Coletti & Keejay Freak Remix) – 5:46
8. "Starlight" (Da Brozz Remix) – 5:56
9. "Starlight" (DJs from Mars Remix) – 6:10
10. "Starlight" (Riccardo Piparo Remix) – 6:13
11. "Starlight" (DKS Pop App Remix) – 5:51
12. "Starlight" (Karmin Shiff & Fine Touch Remix) – 7:04
- Official remixes
1. "Starlight" – 4:22
2. "Starlight" (radio edit version) – 3:30
3. "Starlight" (Carl Hanaghan Radio Edit) – 3:28
4. "Starlight" (Carl Hanaghan Mixshow) – 4:13
5. "Starlight" (Carl Hanaghan Club Remix) – 7:34
6. "Starlight" (JRMX Club Remix) – 7:06
7. "Starlight" (JRMX Radio Edit) – 3:19
8. "Starlight" (My Doctor Elvis Remix) – 5:53
9. "Starlight" (The Cube Guys Remix) – 7:09
10. "Starlight" (Outwork Remix) – 6:18
11. "Starlight" (Fuzzy Hair Remix) – 6:07
12. "Starlight" (Stefano Mattara Remix) – 6:47
13. "Starlight" (Gianni Coletti & Keejay Freak Remix) – 5:46
14. "Starlight" (Da Brozz Remix) – 5:56
15. "Starlight" (DJs From Mars Remix) – 6:10
16. "Starlight" (Riccardo Piparo Remix) – 6:13
17. "Starlight" (DKS Pop App Remix) – 5:51
18. "Starlight" (Karmin Shiff & Fine Touch Remix) – 7:04

== Charts ==
Chart (2011)	Peak position
UK Indie (OCC)	26
Italian Airplay Chart	50
Italian Club Chart	35

== Live performances ==
- iTunes Festival (27 July 2009)
- Koko Pop (April 2011)
- The Hour (May 2011)
- Lorraine (May 2011)
- Style the Nation (June 2011)
- This Morning (June 2011)
