= Departure Lounge (band) =

English alternative rock band

Departure Lounge are an English alternative rock group.

== History ==
Departure Lounge was initially known as Tim Keegan & Departure Lounge, reflecting the fact that the band evolved from a solo project and Tim Keegan was the singer and main lyricist. They released an album under this name in 1999 (the US version with different tracklisting as Departure Lounge in 2000), Out of Here, which received warm reviews in both the general and music press (subsequent re-releases of the CD have changed the name to simply Departure Lounge). They assumed the simpler group name for their two subsequent albums, Jetlag Dreams (2001) and Too Late To Die Young (2002), both of which were released on former Cocteau Twins member Simon Raymonde's Bella Union label.

Departure Lounge disbanded in late 2002. Keegan went on to work on solo projects. Chris Anderson has played with a variety of bands as well as performing and recording as "Crayola Lectern" since 2006.

In April 2016, Jetlag Dreams was re-issued by Bella Union on clear vinyl for Record Store Day.

In September 2019, Departure Lounge re-formed with all four original members for their first live shows in 17 years in Brighton and London. They subsequently recorded an album of new material at Middle Farm Studios in Devon and signed to Liverpool / Paris indie label Violette Records.

== Members ==
- Tim Keegan - lead vocals, guitar (ex-Ringo, Robyn Hitchcock, Homer)
- Jake Kyle - bass, trumpet (ex-Blue Aeroplanes, Robyn Hitchcock)
- Chris Anderson - guitar, keyboards, saxophone, oboe (ex-Supermodel, Map)
- Lindsay Jamieson - drums, keyboards (ex-Supermodel, Deep Season)
