= Circles (Just My Good Time) =

Single by Busface featuring Sophie Ellis-Bextor

from the album Devils, Sharks & Spaceships
- Released: 28 March 2005
- Recorded: 2004
- Genre: Dance
- Length: 3:30
- Label: Polydor
- Songwriter(s): Hugh Brooker; Seb Wronski; Sophie Ellis-Bextor
- Producer(s): Hugh Brooker

Busface singles chronology
"Circles (Just My Good Time)" (2005)	"U R The Future" (2005)

Sophie Ellis-Bextor singles chronology
"I Won't Change You" (2003)	"Circles (Just My Good Time)" (2005)	"Catch You" (2007)

Alternative cover
- Australian cover

"Circles (Just My Good Time)" is a 2005 collaborative single by Australian production duo Busface and British singer-songwriter Sophie Ellis-Bextor, credited as Mademoiselle E.B. on all releases of the single. The single underperformed in major charts, peaking at number 96 in the UK and at number 63 in Australia, but was more successful on the dance charts in both countries.

== Track listing ==
CD single

1. "Circles (Just My Good Time)" (Busface Radio Edit) 3:30
2. "Circles (Just My Good Time)" (EMP Mix) 7:11
3. "Circles (Just My Good Time)" (Busface 12") 6:44
4. "Circles (Just My Good Time)" (Spandex Mix) 4:40
5. "Circles (Just My Good Time)" (Spandex Dub) 4:38

12" Vinyl

1. "Circles (Just My Good Time)" (Busface 12") 6:44
2. "Circles (Just My Good Time)" (Spandex Mix) 4:40
3. "Circles (Just My Good Time)" (EMP Mix) 7:11
4. "Circles (Just My Good Time)" (Spandex Dub) 4:38

== Charts ==
Chart (2004)	Peak position
Australia (ARIA Charts)	63
CIS Airplay (TopHit)	62
UK Singles (OCC)	96
