= Junior Caldera =

- Origin: Paris, France
- Genres: EDM, electro house, house, rock (early material)
- Years active: 2002–present
- Label: Universal (France)
- Website: http://www.juniorcaldera.com/

Jérôme Dumas (French pronunciation: [ʒeʁom dymɑ]), better known as Junior Caldera, is a French disc jockey from Paris. A multi-instrumentalist, Caldera was influenced by many musical styles and made rock music before becoming involved in house music in 2002 whilst working as a stage designer in a number of Parisian nightclubs.

Dumas's professional transition was preceded by several years of formal conservatory training in saxophone, guitar, and bass. During his tenure as a stage designer, he was mentored by DJ Master Seb, who secured his initial residency at the D! Club in Lausanne.

To date, he has released one studio album and three official singles, two of which have reached the top 40 of the French singles chart. Aside from his solo career, Caldera has produced remixes for a number of musicians, such as Paulina Rubio, Enrique Iglesias and Janet Jackson's "Call on Me".

== History ==
Following his move into electronic music in 2002, Caldera was given a residency at D! Club in Lausanne and in 2003 he won a mixing contest and was awarded to opportunity to warm up for David Guetta. He later moved on to electronic dance music and in 2007, his track "Sexy" became popular in many French clubs, reaching the top 5 of the French Club Charts. Following this success, Caldera was invited to remix tracks by various notable artists, including the Pussycat Dolls, Enrique Iglesias and Paul Van Dyk.

Caldera continued to work on his solo career, and on 18 May 2009 he released his first studio album, Debut, which reached a peak position of #193 in the French albums chart. The album featured guest a performance from Sophie Ellis-Bextor. To date, Caldera has released three official singles; "Feel It" was released in February 2008 but failed to chart, and "Sleeping Satellite" (a house remix of the Tasmin Archer track) was brought out on 15 September 2008 and reached a respectable #37 in the French singles chart, staying in the chart for 12 weeks.

In 2012, Caldera's single, "Lights Out (Go Crazy)", which features Natalia Kills and Far East Movement, was featured in a trailer for the fighting game, Tekken Tag Tournament 2.

His highest charting single so far is "Can't Fight this Feeling", with Sophie Ellis-Bextor, which managed a peak position of #13 in France and has been in the chart for 17 consecutive weeks. It was also a smash hit in Russia, where it topped the charts, and was a worldwide hit on the club scene. This year, he made a remix of the song "Live Your Dreams". This song is a Soraya Arnelas's (a Spanish singer) collaboration with the very famous French DJ Antoine Clamaran. The song has been very successful and has been on the list of more than 14 countries, too. The original track (called 'Radio Edit') will be included in the new Soraya's album, 'Dreamer', on sale September 28.

Recently, he collaborated with Ken Roll and also formed a DJ duo called TWOPILOTS.

== Discography ==
=== Albums ===
- Debut (2009) – FRA #193

=== Singles ===
- "Feel It" (2008)
- "Sleeping Satellite" (2008) – FRA #37
- "The Way" (2009) – FRA #22
- "What You Get" (2009) – FRA #14
- "Algo De Ti" featuring Paulina Rubio (2010) – SP #48
- "Can't Fight This Feeling" featuring Sophie Ellis-Bextor (2010) – FRA #13, RUS #1
- "A Little Bit More" featuring Keely Pressly (2010)
- "(It Is) Blasphemy" featuring Jack Strify from Cinema Bizarre (2011)
- "Lights Out (Go Crazy)" featuring Natalia Kills & Far East Movement – (2012) RUS #1, CAN #85, MALTA #3
