= Heartbreak (Make Me a Dancer) =

2009 single by Freemasons featuring Sophie Ellis-Bextor

Single by Freemasons featuring Sophie Ellis-Bextor

from the album Shakedown 2 and Make a Scene
- Released: 15 June 2009
- Recorded: London, England
- Genre: House; dance-pop; nu-disco
- Length: 3:05
- Label: Loaded; Fascination
- Songwriters: James Wiltshire; Russell Small; Richard Stannard; Sophie Ellis-Bextor
- Producers: James Wiltshire; Russell Small

Freemasons singles chronology
"If" (2009)	"Heartbreak (Make Me a Dancer)" (2009)	"Believer" (2010)

Sophie Ellis-Bextor singles chronology
"Today the Sun's on Us" (2007)	"Heartbreak (Make Me a Dancer)" (2009)	"Can't Fight This Feeling" (2010)

Music video
- "Heartbreak (Make Me a Dancer)" on YouTube

"Heartbreak (Make Me a Dancer)" is a song by English production duo the Freemasons and English singer Sophie Ellis-Bextor. The song was written by the production duo James Wiltshire and Russell Small, Richard Stannard and Ellis-Bextor, and production by Wiltshire and Small. It was released on 15 June 2009 by Loaded Records and Fascination Records in promotion of the Freemasons' second studio album, Shakedown 2 (2009), and as the lead single from Ellis-Bextor's fourth album, Make a Scene (2011).

== Release ==
The song was first uploaded to Ellis-Bextor's official MySpace page on 2 June 2008. It was announced on 22 February 2009 that it would be released as her new single, and the first from her upcoming fourth studio album. The song was premiered on BBC Radio 1's The Scott Mills Show on 24 April 2009. The song was added to the station's B-list on 17 June. While Ellis-Bextor promoted the single in the UK, the Freemasons promoted the single in the United States, performing the song on 2 May 2009 at the Town Club in Washington, D.C. The single was then added to the A-list on Galaxy FM, and the A-list on Kiss Due to this, it reached number one on the Cool Cuts Airplay Chart. The single also reached number one on the MTV Dance Chart, becoming a smash hit, where it sat at the top position for thirteen consecutive weeks. The single peaked at number nine on the MTV TMF UK Chart. The song also reached the number one spot at the top of the Gaydar Radio Top 20. The single reached number two on the UK Dance Chart, as well number two on the UK Indie Chart in the week of 3 July 2009. The song also became was Popjustice's "Song of the Day" on 11 March 2009, and was nominated for the Best Single of 2009 award at the first ever Download Music Awards. The song also peaked at number 21 on the Digital Spy Top 50 Singles of 2009. The single also peaked at number 33 on Popjustice's Top 45 Singles of 2009. Ellis-Bextor performed the song live for the first time on TV on the National Lottery Show on 20 May. She performed at GMTV on 16 June 2009.

== Music video ==
The music video was directed by Chris Sweeney and filmed on 21 April 2009. The video was released 8 May and it features Ellis-Bextor dancing and singing the song in a futuristic setting surrounded by dancers and special effects. The video version of the song differs from the original edit; the breaks between verses are shorter, and the bridge towards the end of the song is quicker and is mixed differently.

== Commercial performance ==
The song made its debut on the UK Singles Chart at number 164 on 14 June 2009 as it was released that day on the iTunes Store. The following week, the single climbed 149 places to reach number 15, counting only the downloads from the exclusive iTunes bundle. In its third week, the song climbed to number 13. It also peaked at number two on the UK Dance Chart where it stayed for 13 weeks.

== Track listings ==
- Digital download
1. "Heartbreak (Make Me a Dancer)" (Extended Mix)
2. "Heartbreak (Make Me a Dancer)" (Steve Mac Mix)
3. "Heartbreak (Make Me a Dancer)" (Full Length Club Mix)
4. "Heartbreak (Make Me a Dancer)" (Instrumental)
5. "Heartbreak (Make Me a Dancer)" (Dub Mix)
6. "Heartbreak (Make Me a Dancer)" (Gaydar Mix)
7. "Heartbreak (Make Me a Dancer)" (Bobina Mix)
8. "Heartbreak (Make Me a Dancer)" (Bobina Dub)
9. "Heartbreak (Make Me a Dancer)" (Anger Dimmas Mix)
- CD single
1. "Heartbreak (Make Me a Dancer)" (Radio Edit)
2. "Heartbreak (Make Me a Dancer)" (Club Mix)
3. "Uninvited"
4. "When You Touch Me"
- CD maxi single
1. "Heartbreak (Make Me a Dancer)" (Radio Edit) – 3:24
2. "Heartbreak (Make Me a Dancer)" (Club Mix) – 9:14
3. "Heartbreak (Make Me a Dancer)" (The Mac Project Mix) – 7:57
4. "Heartbreak (Make Me a Dancer)" (Bitrocka Club Mix) – 6:46
5. "Heartbreak (Make Me a Dancer)" (Bitrocka Italo Mix) – 6:30
6. "Heartbreak (Make Me a Dancer)" (Bitrocka Moving Dub) – 7:05
- 12" single
1. "Heartbreak (Make Me a Dancer)" (Radio Edit)
2. "Heartbreak (Make Me a Dancer)" (Club Mix)
3. "Heartbreak (Make Me a Dancer)" (The Mac Project Remix)
4. "Heartbreak (Make Me a Dancer)" (Bitrocka Club Mix)
- Other versions
1. "Heartbreak (Make Me a Dancer)" (2014 Extended) – 9:39

== Charts ==
=== Weekly charts ===
Weekly chart performance for "Heartbreak (Make Me a Dancer)"
Chart (2009)	Peak position
Australia (ARIA)	51
Australian Dance (ARIA)	9
Belgium (Ultratop 50 Flanders)	33
Belgium (Ultratip Bubbling Under Wallonia)	4
Belgium Dance (Ultratop Flanders)	4
CIS Airplay (TopHit)	2
Finland (Suomen virallinen lista)	19
Hungary (Editors' Choice Top 40)	8
Ireland (IRMA)	38
Netherlands (Single Top 100)	85
Russia Airplay (TopHit)	2
Scottish Singles Sales (Official Charts)	5
UK Singles (Official Charts)	13
UK Dance (Official Charts)	2
UK Indie (Official Charts)	2

=== Year-end charts ===
2009 year-end chart performance for "Heartbreak (Make Me a Dancer)"
Chart (2009)	Position
CIS (TopHit)	41
Russia Airplay (TopHit)	11

2010 year-end chart performance for "Heartbreak (Make Me a Dancer)"
Chart (2010)	Position
CIS (TopHit)	195
Russia Airplay (TopHit)	145

=== Decade-end charts ===
Decade-end chart performance for "Heartbreak (Make Me a Dancer)"
Chart (2000–2009)	Position
Russia Airplay (TopHit)	87

== Release history ==
Region	Date	Format	Ref.
United Kingdom	15 June 2009	Digital download	
United States	21 June 2009	Digital download	
Spain	22 June 2009	Digital download	
United Kingdom	22 June 2009	CD single	
Australia	7 August 2009	CD single	

== Live performances ==
- XXL – 12 April 2009
- Town Club, Washington DC, USA – 2 May 2009
- The National Lottery Show – 20 May 2009
- GMTV – 16 June 2009
- G-A-Y – 20 June 2009
- BBC Breakfast – 23 June 2009
- Totally Saturday – 27 June 2009
- Summer Festival 2009 – Moscow, Russia – 28 June 2009
- G-A-Y – 2 July 2009 (Freemasons' album launch party)
- Mantra Garden Bar – Dublin, Ireland – 4 June 2009
- Saturday Night with Miriam – 11 June 2009
- T4 on the Beach – Weston-super-mare, UK – 19 July 2009
- Party in the Park – Leeds, UK – 26 July 2009
- iTunes Festival – UK – 27 July 2009
- New Year's Eve in Moscow, Russia – 31 December 2009
- Nightingale's Club, Birmingham, UK – 30 January 2010
- Little World Festival, Méribel, France – 17 March 2010
- NYC Gay Pride 2010, New York, USA – 27 June 2010
