= The Feeling discography =

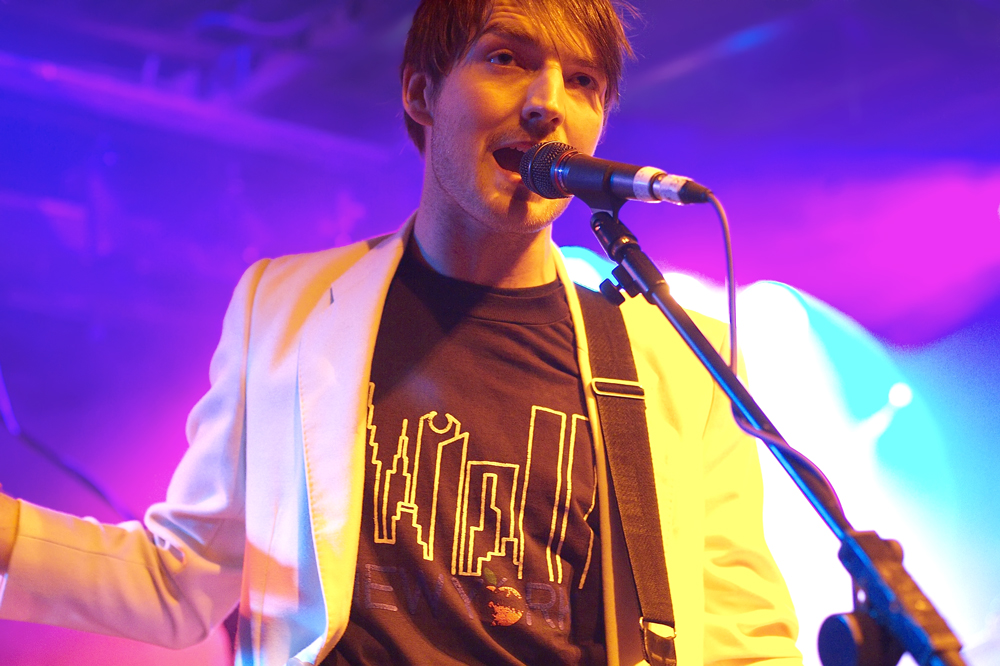
- The Feeling at The Marquee Club, Leicester Square, London, UK. February 2005
- Studio albums: 7
- Extended plays: 1
- Singles: 24
- Video albums: 1
- Music videos: 19

The discography of The Feeling, a British rock/pop band, consists of seven studio albums and twenty-four singles.

Their debut album, Twelve Stops and Home, was released in 2006, and reached number 2 on the UK Albums Chart. The album produced five top-forty singles. Their second album, Join with Us, produced four singles and reached number 1 on the UK Albums Chart. Their third album, Together We Were Made, reached number 22, but did not produce any singles in the top 100 of the UK Singles Chart. The Feeling's fourth studio album, Boy Cried Wolf, reached number 33 on the UK Albums chart. The band released their self-titled fifth album in March 2016. Predominantly during the COVID-19 2020 lockdowns in London, they recorded and self-produced their sixth studio album Loss. Hope. Love, which was released early May 2022. In September 2021, as a taster for the new album, they released their version of "This Was Me", which Dan Gillespie Sells wrote for the film adaptation of the West End musical Everybody's Talking About Jamie.

== Albums ==
=== Studio albums ===
List of albums, with selected chart positions and certifications
Title	Album details	Peak chart positions									Certifications
Title	Album details	UK	UK Indie	BEL (FL)	EU	GER	IRE	NLD	SCO	US Heat	Certifications
Twelve Stops and Home	Released: 5 June 2006; Label: Island; Formats: CD, digital download	2	—	86	9	94	35	81	5	20	BPI:3× Platinum; IFPI: Platinum
Join with Us	Released: 18 February 2008; Label: Island; Formats: CD, digital download	1	—	—	—	—	29	—	4	—	UK: Gold
Together We Were Made	Released: 20 June 2011; Label: Island; Formats: CD, digital download	22	—	—	—	—	—	—	35	—	
Boy Cried Wolf	Released: 7 October 2013; Label: BMG; Format: CD, digital download, box set	33	9	—	—	—	—	—	55	—	
The Feeling	Release: 4 March 2016; Label: Little World Records (Feeling); Formats: CD, digital download	47	6	—	—	—	—	—	51	—	
Loss. Hope. Love.	Release: 6 May 2022; Label: Island; Formats: Vinyl LP, CD, digital download	81	—	—	—	—	—	—	21	—	
San Vito	Release: 12 April 2024; Label: Little World Records (Feeling); Formats: Vinyl LP, CD, digital download	71	3	—	—	—	—	—	28	—	
"—" denotes album that did not chart or was not released

=== Compilation albums ===
Title	Album details
Singles (2006–2011)	Released: 5 December 2011; Label: Island; Formats: CD, digital download

=== Live albums ===
Title	Album details
Live In London	Released: 6 October 2023; Label: Little World Records; Formats: LP, digital download

== Extended plays ==
Title	EP details
Four Stops and Home	Released: 10 October 2006; Label: Island; Formats: CD, digital download

== Singles ==
Title	Year	Peak chart positions										Certifications	Album
Title	Year	UK	AUT	EU	GER	IRE	ITA	NLD	POR	SCO	SWI	Certifications	Album
"Sewn"	2006	7	68	7	85	—	46	44	27	13	44		Twelve Stops and Home
"Fill My Little World"	2006	10	—	9	—	31	—	89	—	18	65	BPI: Gold	Twelve Stops and Home
"Never Be Lonely"	2006	9	—	6	—	31	—	—	—	16	—	BPI: Silver	Twelve Stops and Home
"Love It When You Call"	2006	18	—	—	—	32	—	—	43	22	46	BPI: Silver	Twelve Stops and Home
"Rosé"	2007	38	—	—	—	—	—	—	—	25	—		Twelve Stops and Home
"I Thought It Was Over"	2008	9	67	—	—	—	—	—	—	6	76		Join with Us
"Without You"	2008	53	—	—	—	—	—	—	—	28	31		Join with Us
"Turn It Up"	2008	67	—	—	—	—	—	—	—	24	29		Join with Us
"Join with Us"	2008	87	—	—	—	—	—	—	—	20	—		Join with Us
"Feels Like Christmas"	2008	139	—	—	—	—	—	—	—	—	—		Non-album single
"Set My World on Fire"	2011	128	—	—	—	—	—	—	—	92	—		Together We Were Made
"A Hundred Sinners (Come and Get It)"	2011	—	—	—	—	—	—	—	—	—	—		Together We Were Made
"Rosé" (Unplugged at Abbey Road for Burberry Body)	2011	—	—	—	—	—	—	—	—	—	—		Singles (2006–2011)
"Rescue"	2013	—	—	—	—	—	—	—	—	—	—		Boy Cried Wolf
"Blue Murder"	2013	—	—	—	—	—	—	—	—	—	—		Boy Cried Wolf
"Fall Like Rain"	2014	—	—	—	—	—	—	—	—	—	—		Boy Cried Wolf
"Spiralling"	2016	—	—	—	—	—	—	—	—	—	—		The Feeling
"Wicked Heart"	2016	—	—	—	—	—	—	—	—	—	—		The Feeling
"Don't Stop" (with Sophie Ellis-Bextor, featuring Jamie Cullum & Original West End Cast of Everybody's Talking About Jamie)	2021	—	—	—	—	—	—	—	—	—	—		Non-album single
"While You're Still Young" (with Sophie Ellis-Bextor)	2021	—	—	—	—	—	—	—	—	—	—		Everybody's Talking About Jamie
"This Was Me" (Alternative Version)	2021	—	—	—	—	—	—	—	—	—	—		Non-album single
"There Is No Music"	2022	—	—	—	—	—	—	—	—	—	—		Loss. Hope. Love.
"The Right Wrong"	2024	—	—	—	—	—	—	—	—	—	—		San Vito
"My Way Up"	2024	—	—	—	—	—	—	—	—	—	—		San Vito
"—" denotes the single failed to chart or was not released

== Video releases ==
Title	Video details
Come Home	Released: 17 November 2008; Label: Island; Format: DVD

== Music videos ==
Year	Video
2006	"Sewn"
2006	"Fill My Little World"
2006	"Never Be Lonely"
2006	"I Love It When You Call"
2007	"Rosé"
2008	"I Thought It Was Over"
2008	"Without You"
2008	"Turn It Up"
2008	"Join with Us"
2011	"Set My World on Fire"
2011	"A Hundred Sinners (Come and Get It)"
2011	"Rosé" (Unplugged at Abbey Road for Burberry Body)
2013	"Rescue"
2013	"Blue Murder"
2014	"Fall Like Rain"
2014	"Empty Restaurant"
2016	"Spiralling"
2016	"Wicked Heart"
2021	"This Was Me"
2022	"There Is No Music"

== Other contributions ==
- The Acoustic Album (2006) – "Sewn"
- The Saturday Sessions: The Dermot O'Leary Show (2007) – "Walk Like an Egyptian"
- Radio One Established 1967 (2007) – "You're So Vain"
- Radio One Live Lounge Volume 3 (2008) – "Work"
- Island Life: 50 Years of Island Life (2009) – "Never Be Lonely"
- 1969 Key to Change (2010) – "In the Year 2525"
