= Singles (2006–2011) =

Compilation album by the Feeling
- Released: 5 December 2011
- Recorded: 2006–2011
- Genre: Power pop
- Labels: UMG; Island
- Producer: The Feeling

The Feeling chronology
Together We Were Made (2011)	Singles (2006–2011) (2011)	Boy Cried Wolf (2013)

Singles from Singles (2006–2011)
- 1. "Rosé" (Unplugged at Abbey Road for Burberry Body)" Released: 26 September 2011

Professional ratings
Review scores
Source	Rating
AllMusic	3/5 stars

Singles (2006–2011) is the first compilation by the British rock band the Feeling, released on 5 December 2011 through Universal Records.

The album collects all 11 singles from the band's three previous studio albums, Twelve Stops and Home, Join with Us and Together We Were Made, two album tracks and a new version of "Rosé". This new version of "Rosé", recorded for the Burberry Body campaign, was released as the lead single from the album on 26 September 2011. The Rosé EP was released on 28 November 2011.

Lead singer Dan Gillespie Sells stated: "The Burberry advert is going to take our music to parts of the world where it's never been before, so we wanted to put together a retrospective of some of our best moments for anyone who has just discovered us. Plus, we've been releasing records for half a decade now, which feels like something worth celebrating. It's definitely a collection of songs that we're very proud of."

== Track listing ==
No.	Title	Length
1.	"Fill My Little World"	4:09
2.	"Sewn"	5:55
3.	"Never Be Lonely"	3:32
4.	"Love It When You Call"	3:35
5.	"Rosé"	3:29
6.	"Strange"	4:23
7.	"I Thought It Was Over"	4:00
8.	"Without You"	4:48
9.	"Turn It Up"	3:53
10.	"Join with Us"	4:38
11.	"Set My World on Fire"	3:57
12.	"A Hundred Sinners (Come and Get It)"	3:40
13.	"Leave Me Out of It" (featuring Sophie Ellis-Bextor)	4:26
14.	"Rosé" (Unplugged at Abbey Road for Burberry Body)	4:32
Total length:		58:57

Digital deluxe edition
No.	Title	Length
15.	"This Promise"	4:07
16.	"Truth Comes Out"	3:51
17.	"This Time" (orchestral vocal version)	3:40
18.	"Fill My Little World" (music video)
19.	"Sewn" (music video)
20.	"Never Be Lonely" (music video)
21.	"Love It When You Call" (music video)
22.	"Rosé" (music video)
23.	"I Thought It Was Over" (music video)
24.	"Without You" (music video)
25.	"Turn It Up" (music video)
26.	"Join with Us" (music video)
27.	"Set My World on Fire" (music video)
28.	"A Hundred Sinners (Come and Get It)" (music video)
