= List of Al Murray's Happy Hour episodes =

Al Murray's Happy Hour is a chat show presented by comedian Al Murray and produced by Avalon Television that aired on ITV1.

== Episodes ==
=== Series 1 ===
Al Murray's Happy Hour Series 1
No. overall	No. in season	Guests	Musical Songs/Guests Performed	Original release date	Notes and References
1	1	Jason Donovan; Amanda Holden; Jayne Torvill; Christopher Dean	Katie Melua ("Nine Million Bicycles" & "Crazy Little Thing Called Love")	13 January 2007	
2	2	Jean-Christophe Novelli; Myleene Klass; James Cracknell; Ben Fogle	The Feeling ("Rosé" & "Fat Bottomed Girls")	20 January 2007	
3	3	Emma Bunton; James Hewitt; Duncan Bannatyne	McFly ("Transylvania" & "Don't Stop Me Now")	27 January 2007	(Note: The title of the show changed after Duncan Bannatyne's interview to "Bannatyne's Happy Hour" – he likes to attach his name to his assets. (e.g. Bannatyne's Casino).)
4	4	Buzz Aldrin; Martin Kemp; Jodie Kidd	Sophie Ellis-Bextor ("Catch You" & "Radio Ga Ga")	3 February 2007	
5	5	Jermaine Jackson; Anneka Rice; Aled Jones	The Ordinary Boys ("I Luv U" & "I Want to Break Free")	10 February 2007	
6	6	Jerry Springer; Linda Lusardi; Len Goodman	Lemar ("Tick Tock" & "A Kind of Magic")	17 February 2007	
7	7	Shane Warne; Abi Titmuss; David Coulthard	Melanie C ("I Want Candy" & "One Vision")	24 February 2007	
8	8	John Barrowman; Natalie Cassidy; Donny Osmond	Madness ("Sorry" & "Killer Queen")	3 March 2007	
9	9	Louis Walsh; Penny Lancaster; Dennis Waterman	We Will Rock You cast Queen ("We Will Rock You")	10 March 2007	(Note: At the end of the final episode of the first series, Al Murray awakes in bed from sleep thinking that his singing with Queen was a dream. He then looks around to find Queen next to him in his bed.)

=== Series 2 ===
Al Murray's Happy Hour Series 2
No. overall	No. in season	Guests	Musical Songs/Guests Performed	Original release date	Notes and References
10	1	Barbara Windsor; James Blunt; Cerys Matthews; Marc Bannerman	Cerys Matthews ("Don't Stop Me Now")	11 January 2008	(Note: First episode where one of the main three guests sang. Cerys, who only sang the Queen cover, was chosen over James Blunt, who was promoting his new album. First episode where the Queen cover was a reprise of a cover performed in a past episode.)
11	2	Christopher Biggins; Greg Rusedski; Ben Miller	Scouting For Girls ("Elvis Ain't Dead" & "I Want It All")	18 January 2008	
12	3	Melanie Brown; James May; Dale Winton	David Jordan ("Sun Goes Down" & "Tie Your Mother Down")	25 January 2008	(Note: Al, at one point, gets the whole audience to shout "Shame on you!" towards Eddie Murphy because of his false claims over the paternity of Mel B's second child.)
13	4	Adrian Chiles; Westlife; Lembit Opik; Gabriela Irimia	The Feeling ("I Thought It Was Over" & "Under Pressure")	1 February 2008	
14	5	Brendan Cole; Holly Willoughby; Trisha Goddard	The Hoosiers ("Worst Case Scenario" & "Killer Queen")	8 February 2008	
15	6	John Barrowman; Ricky Hatton; Myleene Klass	Hard-Fi ("I Shall Overcome" & "Another One Bites the Dust")	15 February 2008	(Note: Al, at one point, gets the whole audience to shout "Shame on you!" towards Floyd Mayweather Jr. because he beat Ricky Hatton to destroy his winning streak.)
16	7	Kym Ryder; Piers Morgan; Michael Winner	The Wombats ("Moving To New York" & "Bicycle Race")	22 February 2008	
17	8	Phil Vickery; Alan Dale; Richard Madeley; Judy Finnigan	KT Tunstall ("If Only" & "Hammer to Fall")	29 February 2008	
18	9	Andy Serkis; Kelly Osbourne; Paul Daniels	Bryan Adams ("I Thought I'd Seen Everything" & "Fat Bottomed Girls")	7 March 2008	
19	10	James Martin; Nicky Clarke; Jason Gardiner	One Night Only ("Just for Tonight" & "Crazy Little Thing Called Love")	14 March 2008	
20	11	Peter Davison; Konnie Huq; Laurence Llewelyn-Bowen	Squeeze ("Cool for Cats" & "Seven Seas of Rhye")	21 March 2008	
21	12	Alex James; Penny Smith; Rupert Grint	The Enemy ("This Song" & "We Will Rock You")	28 March 2008	(Note: The intro music for all three guests was an Oasis song ("Rock and Roll Star", "Magic Pie", and "Morning Glory" for James, Grint, and Smith respectively), presumably to irritate Blur bassist Alex James.)
22	13	Denise Van Outen; Kris Marshall; Terry Venables	Queen + Paul Rodgers ("C-lebrity" Bohemian Rhapsody "All Right Now")	4 April 2008	(Note: The first time that the second song has not been a Queen song.)

=== Series 3 ===
Al Murray's Happy Hour Series 3
No. overall	No. in season	Guests	Musical Songs/Guests Performed	Original release date	Notes and References
23	1	Phil Collins; Fiona Phillips; Philip Glenister	New Kids on the Block ("Summertime" & "We Will Rock You"/"We Are the Champions")	12 September 2008	(Note: Instead of singing one Queen cover, the New Kids on the Block performed a medley of songs including We Will Rock You and We are the Champions)
24	2	Ted Danson; Jane McDonald; Coleen Nolan; Mark Austin	Estelle ("Pretty Please (Love Me)" & "A Kind of Magic")	19 September 2008	
25	3	Jack Osbourne; Dita Von Teese; McFly	The Kooks ("Sway" & "Crazy Little Thing Called Love")	26 September 2008	
26	4	Katherine Jenkins; Melanie C; Tara Palmer-Tomkinson	John Legend ("Killer Queen")	3 October 2008	
27	5	Dawn French; Gok Wan; Robson Green	Sugababes ("Girls" & "Bohemian Rhapsody")	10 October 2008	
28	6	Joanna Lumley; Jesse Metcalfe; Rachel Stevens	Stereophonics ("You're My Star", "The Bartender and the Thief" & "Tie Your Mother Down")	17 October 2008	
29	7	Cilla Black; Des O'Connor; Phillip Schofield	Des O'Connor ("I Want to Break Free")	24 October 2008	(Note: Des O' Connor sang I Want to Break Free as a big band number)
