= Perimenopop =

2025 studio album by Sophie Ellis-Bextor

- Vinyl and digital edition cover (Note: The CD edition features Ellis-Bextor's name and the album title in the upper left and right corner, respectively.)

Studio album by Sophie Ellis-Bextor
- Released: 12 September 2025
- Genres: Disco; pop
- Length: 40:35
- Label: Decca
- Producers: Duck Blackwell; Luke Fitton; Chris Greatti; James Greenwood; Richard Jones; Karma Kid; Baz Kaye; Finn Keane; Kid Harpoon; Jon Shave; Richard Stannard

Sophie Ellis-Bextor chronology
Hana (2023)	Perimenopop (2025)

HMV exclusive artwork
- Artwork for the Drinking Milk Edition

Singles from Perimenopop
- 1. "Freedom of the Night" Released: 18 October 2024; 2. "Relentless Love" Released: 28 March 2025; 3. "Vertigo" Released: 25 April 2025; 4. "Taste" Released: 9 May 2025; 5. "Dolce Vita" Released: 25 July 2025; 6. "Stay on Me" Released: 11 September 2025; 7. "(Christmas) Time" Released: 21 November 2025

Perimenopop is the eighth studio album by British singer and songwriter Sophie Ellis-Bextor. It was released on 12 September 2025, through Decca Records, marking her first album with the label. The album was preceded by the release of six singles: "Freedom of the Night", "Relentless Love", "Vertigo", "Taste", "Dolce Vita" and "Stay on Me".

Perimenopop was met with widespread critical acclaim, with music critics highlighting Ellis-Bextor's artistry, and overall performance, as well praising the album cohesion, and fusion of disco and pop genres. Commercially, the album charted within the top ten in Scotland, and the United Kingdom, becoming her highest-charting effort in over a decade in the latter, since Wanderlust (2014).

== Background ==
After the release of her seventh studio album Hana, Ellis-Bextor announced plans to return to her early pop sound with a tentative album titled The Invisible Line. In late 2023, following the release of the film Saltburn, her 2001 single "Murder on the Dancefloor" re-entered international charts, reaching its original peak at number two on the UK Singles Chart and charting in the United States for the first time. By the end of 2024, it was the year's best-selling single by a female artist in the UK. During this period, Ellis-Bextor signed with Universal Music Group to release her eighth studio album, and released the album lead single, "Freedom of the Night", accompanied by a music video directed by Sophie Muller, which served as a continuation of "Murder on the Dancefloor".

On 9 May, it was announced that Ellis-Bextor's eighth studio album would be titled Perimenopop, a wordplay on "perimenopause" and "pop", reflecting the stage of life she is in while creating pop music. She commented that she had previously felt when she was younger that she might not be able to continue working in the pop genre as she get older, but noted that attitudes have changed with younger generations. Ellis-Bextor stated: "I actually think a lot of my kids' generation don't care what age you are, they just want to have good music." According to the album's press release, Perimenopop is "a playful celebration" of her current life and music career. The album was promoted as the record Ellis-Bextor was "meant to make", marking a confident return to her established dance-pop style. In a social media post, Ellis-Bextor said about the album:

"I've been singing for 30 years now – I know! – and throughout my career I've been lucky enough to happily play with many music genres, but my heart beats the fastest for pop. This album is a celebration of that relationship. In fact, it's a celebration of lots of things, including being the age I'm at and still having so many adventures and so much fun!"

— Ellis-Bextor on her new album, via Melodic Magazine

== Composition ==
The album features production by Karma Kid, James Greenwood, Jon Shave, Kid Harpoon, Baz Kaye, Finn Keane, Richard Stannard, Duck Blackwell, Chris Greatti, and Luke Fitton, with additional production by Ellis-Bextor's husband and the Feeling bassist, Richard Jones. During the making of the album, Ellis-Bextor collaborated with a variety of singers and songwriters from dance, and pop genres, including Clementine Douglas, MNEK, Jin Jin, Julia Michaels, Nile Rodgers, Shura, Sigrid, and Selena Gomez.

== Promotion ==
=== Singles ===
The album spawned six singles. "Freedom of the Night", released on 18 October 2024, served as the album lead single. It was followed by "Relentless Love" and "Vertigo" as the second and third singles in 2025. "Taste" was released as the fourth single on 9 May, alongside the album's announcement. "Dolce Vita" was issued as the fifth single on 25 July. A day before the album's release, on 11 September, "Stay on Me" was released as the album sixth single, accompanied by a music video directed by Sophie Muller.

== Critical reception ==
Professional ratings
Aggregate scores
Source	Rating
Metacritic	84/100
Review scores
Source	Rating
AllMusic	4/5 stars
Clash	7/10
Euphoria.	4/5 stars
The Independent	4/5 stars
Jenesaispop	4/5 stars
The Line of Best Fit	9/10
musicOMH	4/5 stars
Music Week	5/5 stars
Musikexpress	4/6 stars

Upon release, Perimenopop received critical acclaim from music critics. According to the review aggregator Metacritic, Perimenopop received "universal acclaim" based on a weighted average score of 84 out of 100 from 6 critic scores. It is Ellis-Bextor's highest-rated project on the site.

Quentin Harrison of The Line of Best Fit awarded the album nine out of ten, calling it a "reclamation and refinement" from an artist who helped define "the U.K. dance scene of the 2000s." He described Perimenopop as "always an engaging listen" and praised Ellis-Bextor's vocal performance for how "effectively she handles vulnerable stock with her vocal instrument." Harrison also commended her songwriting, noting that her "pen leads on every cut," and highlighted her overall musicianship, stating that the record and her choice of collaborators demonstrate her "commitment to her vocation in how she balances both compositional substance and hooks aplenty in her songcraft." Roisin O’Connor of The Independent rated the album four out of five stars, describing Ellis-Bextor as being "in her most commanding, confident form." She wrote that with Perimenopop, Ellis-Bextor "is out to prove that, however our ageist, misogynist music industry might see it, women are more than capable of churning out bangers past the age of 25," adding that Ellis-Bextor "succeeds, spectacularly."

Christina Mohr of Musikexpress praised Ellis-Bextor confidence and ability to "radiate an indestructible dignity", noting that she "invites everyone to a big 'Menopop' party" on an "unpopular topic in pop, as the female menopause." Mohr added that Ellis-Bextor incorporates "a few scoops of optimism and sexiness" into a production already made to "hit the dancefloors around the world." Graham Finney of TotalNtertainment also gave a positive review, saying that Perimenopop is "the sound of a confident Ellis-Bextor ready to disco dance her way into the next chapter of her story".

Joe McIndoe of Music Week gave the album a perfect score of five out of five stars, describing it as a "big, bright, and irrepressibly catchy" record. McIndoe also commented that "after committing "Murder on the Dancefloor" almost a quarter of a century ago, Ellis-Bextor has killed it once more. Perimenopop is her latest weapon of choice, and she wields it with exuberant aplomb." Andrew Braithwaite of Music Talkers, also gave the album a positive review, stating that "Perimenopop is Ellis-Bextor at her most confident—radiant disco for grown-up dreamers that proves pop doesn't just survive mid-life, it thrives there."

== Track listing ==
Perimenopop track listing
No.	Title	Writer(s)	Producer(s)	Length
1.	"Relentless Love"	Sophie Ellis-Bextor; Janée Bennett; Baz Kaye; Samuel Knowles	Karma Kid; Kaye; Richard Jones^{[a]}	4:03
2.	"Vertigo"	Ellis-Bextor; James Greenwood; Hannah Robinson	Greenwood	3:31
3.	"Taste"	Ellis-Bextor; Jon Shave; Uzoechi Emenike	Shave	2:50
4.	"Stay on Me"	Ellis-Bextor; Caroline Ailin; Selena Gomez; Thomas Hull; Julia Michaels	Kid Harpoon; Jones^{[a]}	3:07
5.	"Dolce Vita"	Ellis-Bextor; David Arnold; Clementine Douglas; Allan Wayne Felder; Norman Harris; Knowles; Kaye; Ron Tyson	Karma Kid; Kaye; Jones^{[a]}^{[v]}	3:31
6.	"Time"	Ellis-Bextor; Emenike; Shave	Shave	4:08
7.	"Glamorous"	Ellis-Bextor; Finn Keane; Sigrid Solbakk Raabe	Keane; Jones^{[v]}	3:21
8.	"Freedom of the Night"	Ellis-Bextor; Duck Blackwell; Aleksandra Denton; Richard Stannard	Stannard; Blackwell; Jones; Chris Greatti	3:12
9.	"Layers"	Ellis-Bextor; Greenwood	Greenwood	3:23
10.	"Diamond in the Dark"	Ellis-Bextor; Ed Harcourt; Nile Rodgers	Greatti; Jones^{[a]}^{[v]}	3:04
11.	"Heart Sing"	Ellis-Bextor; Keane; Raabe	Keane; Jones^{[a]}^{[v]}	3:09
12.	"Don't Know What You've Got Until It's Gone"	Ellis-Bextor; Luke Fitton; Robinson	Fitton; Jones^{[a]}	3:12
Total length:				40:35

NFC poster bonus track
No.	Title	Writer(s)	Producer(s)	Length
13.	"Devotion"	Ellis-Bextor; Robinson; Barry Stone; Julian Gingell	Gingell; Stone	3:12
Total length:				43:47

Digital reissue edition
No.	Title	Writer(s)	Producer(s)	Length
13.	"(Christmas) Time"	Ellis-Bextor; Shave; Emenike	Shave; Jones^{[a]}	3:34
Total length:				44:10

=== Notes ===
- ^{^a} signifies an additional producer.
- ^{^[v]} signifies a vocal producer.

== Personnel ==
Credits adapted from Tidal.

=== Musicians ===
- Sophie Ellis-Bextor – vocals
- David Wrench – programming (tracks 1–3, 5–12); percussion (8), synthesizer (8)
- Jackson Ellis-Leach – drums (1, 2, 12)
- Adam Kaye – guitar, synthesizer (1, 5); piano (1); bass guitar, shō (5)
- Samuel Knowles – synthesizer (1, 5), drum programming (1), digital piano (5)
- Guy Pratt – bass guitar (1, 5)
- Gioele Nuzzo – percussion (1, 12)
- David Arnold – strings arrangement (2, 5, 10, 11)
- Ben Foster – concertmaster (2, 5, 10, 11)
- Tom Pigott-Smith – concertmaster (2, 5, 10, 11)
- Peter Gregson – cello (2, 5, 10, 11)
- Vicky Matthews – cello (2, 5, 10, 11)
- Bruce White – viola (2, 5, 10, 11)
- Laurie Anderson – viola (2, 5, 10, 11)
- Rachel Robson – viola (2, 5, 10, 11)
- Ciaran McCabe – violin (2, 5, 10, 11)
- David Juritz – violin (2, 5, 10, 11)
- Kate Robinson – violin (2, 5, 10, 11)
- Laura Melhuish – violin (2, 5, 10, 11)
- Marianna Haynes – violin (2, 5, 10, 11)
- Nina Foster – violin (2, 5, 10, 11)
- Patrick Kiernan – violin (2, 5, 10, 11)
- Richard George – violin (2, 5, 10, 11)
- Steve Morris – violin (2, 5, 10, 11)
- James Greenwood – bass guitar, keyboards, programming, synthesizer (2, 9); piano (9)
- Richard Jones – bass guitar (3, 8, 12), synthesizer (8), Moog bass (10)
- Jon Shave – drums, percussion, programming, synthesizer (3, 6); bass guitar (6)
- Uzoechi Emenike – background vocals (3)
- Kid Harpoon – acoustic guitar, bass guitar, drums, drum programming, electric guitar, programming, synthesizer (4)
- Duck Blackwell – guitar, keyboards, programming (7, 8, 11); drums (8)
- Finn Keane – guitar, keyboards, programming (7, 11)
- Richard "Biff" Stannard – background vocals, percussion (8)
- Chris Greatti – guitar, synthesizer (8)
- Shura – background vocals (8)
- Brad Bowers – bass guitar (8)
- Tom Arnold – concertmaster (10)
- Ray Belli – drums (10)
- Simon Byrt – synthesizer (10)
- Luke Fitton – guitar, keyboards, programming (12)

=== Technical ===
- David Wrench – mixing (1–3, 5–12)
- Mark "Spike" Stent – mixing (4)
- Matt Colton – mastering
- Nick Wollage – engineering (2, 5, 10, 11)
- James Greenwood – engineering (2, 9)
- Brian Rajaratnam – engineering (4)
- Kid Harpoon – engineering (4)
- Duck Blackwell – engineering (8)
- Gonzalo Barrera – engineering (8)
- Luke Fitton – engineering (12)
- Charlie Cook – vocal mixing (4)
- Adam Loeffler – digital editing (8)
- Jon Sims – engineering assistance (2, 5, 10, 11)
- Sam Reid – engineering assistance (2, 5, 10, 11)

== Charts ==
Chart performance for Perimenopop
Chart (2025)	Peak position
Belgian Albums (Ultratop Wallonia)	90
French Albums (SNEP)	185
German Albums (Offizielle Top 100)	62
Scottish Albums (Official Charts)	4
Swiss Albums (Schweizer Hitparade)	51
UK Albums (Official Charts)	5

== Release history ==
Perimenopop release history
Region	Date	Format(s)	Label	Version	Ref.
Various	12 September 2025	CD; vinyl; cassette; digital download; streaming	Decca; UMG	Standard	
United Kingdom	12 September 2025	CD; vinyl	Decca; UMG	HMV exclusive	
