= Join with Us =

Join With Us may refer to:

- "Join with Us" (song), a song by the Feeling
- Join with Us (album), an album by the Feeling
