= Boy Cried Wolf =

Studio album by the Feeling
- Released: 7 October 2013
- Genres: Soft rock; pop
- Length: 49:31 (standard edition); 103:07 (deluxe edition)
- Label: BMG
- Producer: The Feeling

The Feeling chronology
Singles (2006–2011) (2011)	Boy Cried Wolf (2013)	The Feeling (2016)

Singles from Boy Cried Wolf
- 1. "Rescue" Released: 20 August 2013

Boy Cried Wolf is the fourth studio album by the British rock group the Feeling. It is available as a standard CD, a double CD featuring an extra disc of jam sessions and studio out-takes recorded "in the Doghouse", and a deluxe box set including the 2 CDs, a 180g vinyl version of the album, a DVD, and a songbook containing sheet music for selected songs on the record.

An acoustic version of the album track "I Just Do" was made available as a free download from the band's website.

It debuted at number 33 on the UK Album Chart on 13 October 2013 with the first two singles from the album, "Rescue" and "Blue Murder" (retitled on the single release as "Boy Cried Wolf"), A-listed by the UK Radio station BBC Radio 2. The album also received critical acclaim.

Boy Cried Wolf is something of a concept album, focusing on lead singer Dan Gillespie-Sells's break up from a five-year relationship. The band's website states that the first song written for the album was "You'll See", with the song being written upon returning home following the break-up.

Music videos were produced for the tracks "Blue Murder", "Rescue", "Fall Like Rain" and "Empty Restaurant".

== Critical reception ==
Professional ratings
Review scores
Source	Rating
AllMusic	3.5/5 stars
Holy Moly	9/10 stars
Q	4/5 stars

The album received generally positive reviews. Q and Sunday Times Culture both called it the best album of the band's career. It also received a 9/10 rating from Holy Moly.

== Track listing ==
No.	Title	Length
1.	"Blue Murder"	4:47
2.	"Anchor"	3:47
3.	"Rescue"	3:35
4.	"Fall Like Rain"	4:35
5.	"A Lost Home"	3:46
6.	"Hides in Your Heart"	1:48
7.	"The Gloves Are Off"	5:43
8.	"You'll See"	4:48
9.	"Empty Restaurant"	4:13
10.	"When I Look Above"	3:10
11.	"I Just Do"	8:56
Total length:		49:31

Deluxe edition bonus disc
No.	Title	Length
1.	"There Used to Be a Man"	7:00
2.	"Look at the Steeple"	7:00
3.	"You Don't Need Me"	3:30
4.	"My Titty"	0:58
5.	"When the Cat's Away Opus Pt. 1: Metal on Metal"	4:52
6.	"When the Cat's Away Opus Pt. 2: Sludge Sandwich"	6:52
7.	"When the Cat's Away Opus Pt. 3: March of the Pigmen"	5:52
8.	"Santa Ate My Face"	7:59
9.	"A Brief History of Time"	9:33
Total length:		53:36

== Personnel ==
- Dan Gillespie-Sells – lead vocals, guitar
- Richard Jones – bass guitar, vocals
- Kevin Jeremiah – lead guitar, vocals
- Ciaran Jeremiah – keyboards, vocals
- Paul Stewart – drums

== Charts ==
Chart (2013)	Peak position
Scottish Albums (Official Charts)	55
UK Albums (Official Charts)	33
