= Set My World on Fire =

Single by The Feeling

from the album Together We Were Made
- B-side: "Seven Years"
- Released: 1 May 2011
- Genre: Guitar pop
- Length: 3:57 (album version); 3:22 (radio edit)
- Label: Island
- Songwriter(s): Dan Gillespie Sells, Richard Jones, Kevin Jeremiah, Ciaran Jeremiah, Paul Stewart
- Producer(s): The Feeling

The Feeling singles chronology
"Feels Like Christmas" (2008)	"Set My World on Fire" (2011)	"A Hundred Sinners (Come and Get It)" (2011)

"Set My World on Fire" is a song by British pop rock band The Feeling. Released in May 2011, it is the lead single and opening track of their third album Together We Were Made.

== Critical reception ==
Robert Leedham for Drowned in Sound gave a mixed response, saying he "understand[s] why [it] was chosen as a lead single: its placement at the time of writing on Radio 2's 'A List' probably justifies the decision. As a song though, it's wet."

== Chart performance ==
The single peaked at #128 in the UK Singles Chart. This compares to the #9 peak position of "I Thought It Was Over", the lead single for the band's previous album Join With Us. It did not chart in any other countries, except for Scotland where it peaked at #92.
