= Dolce Vita (Sophie Ellis-Bextor song) =

Single by Sophie Ellis-Bextor

from the album Perimenopop
- Released: 25 July 2025
- Genre: Disco
- Length: 3:31
- Label: Decca
- Composers: Sophie Ellis-Bextor; Samuel Robert Knowles; Baz Kaye; Ron Tyson; Norman Harris; Allan Wayne Felder; Clementine Douglas; David Arnold
- Producers: Karma Kid; Baz Kaye; Richard Jones (additional)

Sophie Ellis-Bextor singles chronology
"Taste" (2025)	"Dolce Vita" (2025)	"Stay on Me" (2025)

Visualiser video
- "Dolce Vita" on YouTube

"Dolce Vita" is a song by English singer and songwriter Sophie Ellis-Bextor. It was released on 25 July 2025 through Decca Records, as the fifth single from her eighth studio album, Perimenopop (2025).

== Background and release ==
"Dolce Vita" was written by Sophie Ellis-Bextor, Samuel Robert Knowles, Ron Tyson, Norman Harris, Allan Wayne Felder, David Arnold, Clementine Douglas, and Baz Kaye. The track was co-produced by Kaye and Knowles (under his stage name Karma Kid), with additional production by Richard Jones. In the single's press release, Ellis-Bextor said of the track:

"Dolce Vita is inspired by the way you feel about yourself when you're somewhere unfamiliar. You can reinvent yourself and no one knows your story. When I was writing it, I had this little subplot in my head of someone with a criminal past longing to flee and start again somewhere new! But it works too that it's just the nostalgic pull of a foreign trip where you really got to escape for a little while."

— Ellis-Bextor on writing "Dolce Vita", according Stereoboard.

It was released alongside an accompanying visualizer on July 25, 2025, with Ellis-Bextor confirming that it would be the final song released ahead of her eighth studio album. "Dolce Vita" appears as the fifth track on Perimenopop.

== Reception ==
Samantha Mason of mxdwn Music described the track as "perfect for the summertime," writing: "The upbeat, catchy track features bright instrumentals and Ellis-Bextor’s beautiful layered vocals—a match made in heaven." Genna Rivieccio of Culled Culture praised Ellis-Bextor's performance, noting that she "radiates the jubilance that can only be achieved through truly appreciating (and living) la dolce vita," highlighting the song's chorus. Rivieccio also praised the song "dreamy" production which, she stated: "complement the lyrics with sonic levity". Jo Forrest of TotalNtertainment called the track "a sophisticated slice of sunshine", while dubbing it as "joyful". BrooklynVegan included the song among its list of the ten most notable releases of the week.

== Personnel ==
Credits adapted from Apple Music.

- Sophie Ellis-Bextor — vocals, composer
- Samuel Robert Knowles a.k.a. Karma Kid — producer, composer, synthetizer, electric piano
- Baz Kaye — producer, composer
- Richard Jones — additional producer, vocal producer
- Ron Tyson — composer
- Norman Harris — composer
- Allan Wayne Felder — composer
- Clementine Douglas — composer
- David Arnold — composer (string arranger)
- David Wrench — mixing engineer
- Matt Colton — mastering engineer
- Nick Wollage — recording engineer
- Sam Reid — assistant recording engineer
- Jon Sims — assistant recording engineer

== Release history ==
"Dolce Vita" release history
Region	Date	Format(s)	Label	Ref.
Various	25 July 2025	Digital download; streaming	Decca Records	
