= Stay on Me =

Single by Sophie Ellis-Bextor

from the album Perimenopop
- Released: 11 September 2025
- Genre: Disco-pop
- Length: 3:07
- Label: Decca
- Songwriters: Sophie Ellis-Bextor; Selena Gomez; Caroline Ailin; Thomas Hull; Julia Michaels
- Producers: Kid Harpoon; Richard Jones (add.)

Sophie Ellis-Bextor singles chronology
"Dolce Vita" (2025)	"Stay on Me" (2025)

Music video
- "Stay on Me" on YouTube

"Stay on Me" is a song by English singer and songwriter Sophie Ellis-Bextor. It was released on 11 September 2025 through Decca Records, as the sixth single from her eighth studio album, Perimenopop (2025).

== Background and release ==
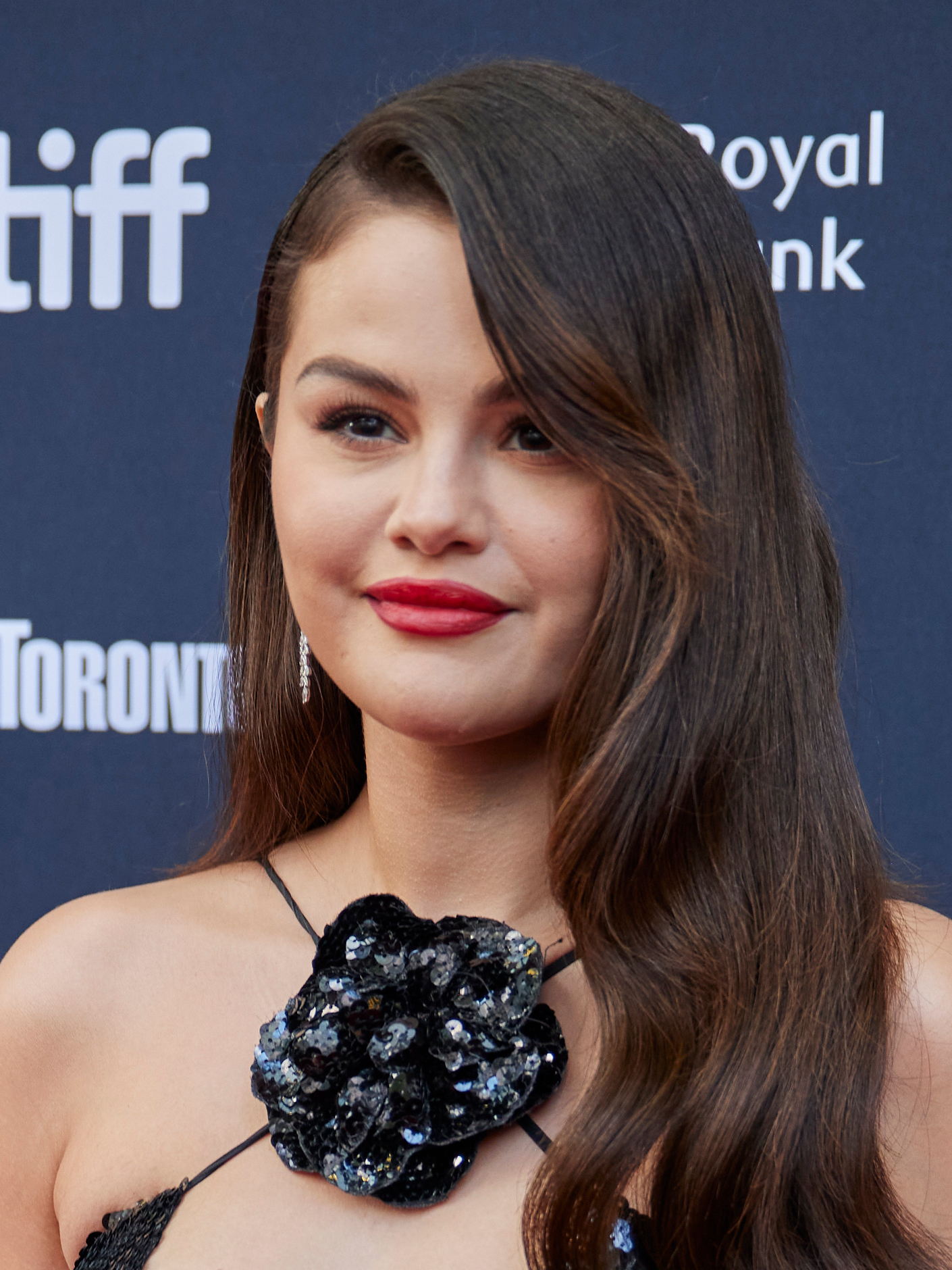
The song was co-written by American pop singer-songwriter and actress, Selena Gomez.

"Stay on Me" was written by Sophie Ellis-Bextor, Selena Gomez, Caroline Ailin, Julia Michaels, and Thomas Hull. The track was produced by Hull (under his stage name Kid Harpoon), with additional production by Richard Jones, and uncredited backing vocals from Gomez. The song appears as the fourth track on Perimenopop.

In an interview with Clash magazine, Ellis-Bextor said of the track:

"Initially it was a lot more flirty. But like every song on Perimenopop, I wanted it to ring true to my life. And look – I’ve just had my 20th wedding anniversary (to Richard, bassist from The Feeling) – so I thought the song should be about the beauty of a long romance. About going out, but still having that feeling of “I think you’re brilliant – I’m so glad you’re coming home with me.”"

— Ellis-Bextor explaining the story behind the track, to Clash magazine

The song was released on 11 September 2025, one day ahead of the album release. "Stay on Me" debuted at number thirty-five on Global's Official Big Top 40 Singles chart.

== Music video ==
It was released alongside an accompanying music video, which was directed by longtime collaborator Sophie Muller. It marks their nineteenth music video together. The music video was shot in the county Kerry of Ireland, with Oscar nominee cinematographer Robbie Ryan, serving as the director of photography, making it his second collaboration with Ellis-Bextor since "Hypnotized" in 2022.

"The music video for ‘Stay On Me’ is out now I had an incredible two days in Co. Kerry in the south west of Ireland filming this with the incredible @darlingangel6, Robbie Ryan as DOP and brilliant @lisalaudat1 for my glam, This is my 19th music video with Sophie Muller and we always have so much fun - I really trust her. It’s our first video involving donkeys though. The landscape was so beautiful - honestly one of the most gorgeous places I’ve ever been, and it felt like the perfect location to make a video for ‘Stay On Me’"

— Ellis-Bextor on an Instagram post, via Irish Independent

== Reception ==
Cory Gourley of Music Is To Blame wrote that the track "proves that Ellis-Bextor has the ability to play with the nuances of disco-pop and can offer much-needed light and shade to her listeners." Gourley continued praising the song for showcasing Ellis-Bextor's "vocal talent, maturity, and [her] ability to genre-bend with ease." Yotam Dov of We Rave You dubbed the track as "shimmering". OUTinPerth included the song on their list "The Latest Tunes Worth Checking-Out" on its week of release.

== Personnel ==
Credits adapted from Apple Music.

- Sophie Ellis-Bextor — vocals, composer
- Thomas Hull (Kid Harpoon) — producer, composer, synthetizer, electric guitar, drums, bass, acoustic guitar, drum programming
- Richard Jones — additional producer
- Selena Gomez — composer, background vocals
- Caroline Ailin — composer
- Julia Michaels — composer
- Brian Rajaratnam — engineer
- Mark "Spike" Stent — mixing engineer
- Charlie Cook — vocal mixing engineer
- Matt Colton — mastering engineer

Video credits adapted from PromoNews.

- Sophie Muller — director
- PRETTYBIRD — production company
- Fiona Bamford-Phillips — director of production
- Emily Rudge — managing director
- Enrique Da Silva — producer
- Aideen O’Sullivan — local producer
- Robbie Ryan —director of photography
- Oisín McFarland-Smith —assistant camera
- Rob Small — gaffer
- Lisa Laudat — hair/make-up artist
- Victoria Adcock — stylist
- Decca Records — label
- Hannah Flaherty — senior marketing manager
- Samii Taylor — marketing coordinator
- Ruth Cronin — social media manager
- Wallace Productions — management

== Release history ==
"Stay on Me" release history
Region	Date	Format(s)	Label	Ref.
Various	11 September 2025	Digital download; streaming	Decca Records	
