= Turn It Up (The Feeling song) =

2008 single by the Feeling

Single by the Feeling

from the album Join with Us
- B-side: "Make Me Pay"; "Femme Fatale"
- Released: 7 July 2008
- Length: 3:30 (radio edit); 3:52 (album version)
- Label: Universal; Island
- Songwriters: Dan Gillespie Sells; Richard Jones; Kevin Jeremiah; Ciaran Jeremiah; Paul Stewart
- Producer: The Feeling

The Feeling singles chronology
"Without You" (2008)	"Turn It Up" (2008)	"Join with Us" (2008)

"Turn It Up" is the third single from English rock band the Feeling's second album, Join with Us (2008). It was released digitally on 30 June, with the CD out on 7 July. Included on the single are "Turn It Up", new song "Make Me Pay", a cover version of the Velvet Underground's "Femme Fatale", and two remixes of "Turn It Up".

Upon its release, the song peaked at number 67 on the UK Singles Chart, becoming their second-lowest-charting single. The band performed "Turn It Up" on The Graham Norton Show on 5 June 2008 and on The Sunday Night Project on 6 July 2008.

== Music video ==
The video was filmed in London on 27 May 2008, and features some of the band's fans, after a competition was run on their website. It premiered on Channel 4's website on 9 June, although it had been played on some music television channels earlier. It was edited in Soho, London at several post production facilities including Locomotion and Rushes.

== Track listings ==
UK CD single and digital download

1. "Turn It Up" – 3:52
2. "Make Me Pay" – 4:20
3. "Femme Fatale" (Velvet Underground cover) – 2:38
4. "Turn It Up" (Alex Gaudino remix) – 7:11
5. "Turn It Up" (Me and Mrs Jones remix) – 5:42

UK 7-inch Coke bottle clear vinyl single

A. "Turn It Up"
B. "Make Me Pay"

== Charts ==
Chart (2008)	Peak position
Scottish Singles Sales (Official Charts)	24
Switzerland Airplay (Schweizer Hitparade)	29
UK Singles (Official Charts)	67
