= Rosé (song) =

2007 single by The Feeling

Single by The Feeling

from the album Twelve Stops and Home
- B-side: "Video Killed the Radio Star"
- Released: 12 February 2007
- Genre: Soft rock
- Length: 4:16 (album version); 3:27 (radio edit)
- Label: Island, Universal
- Songwriters: Dan Gillespie Sells, Richard Jones, Kevin Jeremiah, Ciaran Jeremiah, Paul Stewart
- Producer: The Feeling

The Feeling singles chronology
"Love It When You Call" (2006)	"Rosé" (2007)	"I Thought It Was Over" (2008)

"Rosé" is a song performed by British band The Feeling for their debut studio album, Twelve Stops and Home (2006). The song was released as the album's fifth single on 12 February 2007.

During their interview for the television series, Live from Abbey Road, the band stated that the song is about rosé wine. Dan said that whilst writing the song he was very fond of rosé wine. The basic song was composed while they were drunk on the beverage, and started out as just a drinking song. Later, once they were sober, they condensed and refined it into what is heard on the album.

The music for this song was used by The Chris Moyles Show for their parody "José", about the former Chelsea manager José Mourinho.

== Formats and track listing ==
CD single & Digital EP

(Released 12 February 2007)

1. "Rosé" – 4:17
2. "Sewn" (Dan's original version) – 4:48
3. "Video Killed the Radio Star" (live) (The Buggles cover) – 3:43
4. "Fill My Little Fanfare" – 1:38

7" vinyl

(Released 12 February 2007)

1. "Rosé" – 4:17
2. "Sewn" (Dan's original version) – 4:48

Digital download

(Released 5 February 2007)

1. "Rosé" (radio edit) – 3:27

== Charts ==
Chart (2008)	Peak position
UK Singles Chart	38

== Rosé (Unplugged at Abbey Road for Burberry Body) ==
"Rosé (Unplugged at Abbey Road for Burberry Body)"

Single by The Feeling

from the album Singles: 2006-2011
- Released: 26 September 2011; 28 November 2011 (EP)
- Recorded: 2011
- Genre: Soft rock
- Length: 4:30
- Songwriters: Dan Gillespie Sells, Richard Jones, Kevin Jeremiah, Ciaran Jeremiah, Paul Stewart
- Producer: Dan Gillespie Sells

The Feeling singles chronology
"A Hundred Sinners (Come and Get It)" (2011)	"Rosé (Unplugged at Abbey Road for Burberry Body)" (2011)

"Rosé" (Unplugged at Abbey Road for Burberry Body) is the lead single from The Feeling's compilation album Singles: 2006-2011. This new version of "Rosé" was recorded for Burberry's Burberry Body fragrance campaign and was released on 26 September 2011. An EP release will follow on 28 November 2011.

=== Background ===
Chief Creative Officer of Burberry, Christopher Bailey chose "Rosé" as the soundtrack to the global Burberry Body fragrance advertising campaign for 2011.

Speaking on the collaboration between the brand and the band, Dan Gillespie Sells stated, "They have a great connection with music so this feels like a bona fide artistic endeavor – I did a shoot for Burberry a few years ago and I have always admired their tailoring. Cristopher liked my original piano vocal version and I wanted to do something special with it so we went to Abbey Road and recorded it with strings. I've kept it very simple but the strings give it a feeling of refinement and also heighten the emotions in the song. It's great that "Rosé" has been rediscovered like this because it has always been a favourite with our fans."

Written and produced by Gillespie Sells, the reworked version of "Rosé", titled "Unplugged at Abbey Road for Burberry Body" was recorded with the Langley Sisters at Abbey Road Studios.

=== Formats and track listing ===
Digital download

(Released 26 September 2011)

1. "Rosé (Unplugged at Abbey Road for Burberry Body)" - 4:30

=== Music video ===
The music video for the "Rosé (Unplugged at Abbey Road for Burberry Body)" premiered on The Feeling's YouTube page on 14 October 2011.
