= The Feeling (album) =

Studio album by the Feeling
- Released: 4 March 2016
- Genres: Rock; power pop; soft rock
- Length: 49:24 (standard edition); 122:34 (deluxe edition)
- Label: Little World

The Feeling chronology
| Boy Cried Wolf (2013) | The Feeling (2016) | Loss. Hope. Love. (2022) |

The Feeling is the fifth studio album by the British rock band the Feeling, released on 4 March 2016. The album's production was partly funded by fans via PledgeMusic, which offered pre-orders CD, vinyl, and deluxe formats of the album.

== Recording ==
The album was recorded over ten days as a fully live band, abandoning standard studio availabilities such as click tracks, in order to capture the feel and spirit of a live band. The songs were all recorded one at a time in full takes. Vocalist Dan Gillespie-Sells said "This record captures a kind of energy you’d normally only get if you’ve seen us in concert. When we play live, the music is free and moving together as one whole. It can breathe a bit, and we can react to each other. But it’s hard to recreate that in the studio if you’re recording along to individual parts that were done separately the day before. We had to make sure all the microphones were in exactly the right places and that we really knew the material. But when it came to pressing record, it was just a really fired-up live band in a room playing together."

== Track listing ==
| No. | Title | Length |
|---|---|---|
| 1. | "Wicked Heart" | 3:09 |
| 2. | "Spiralling" | 3:37 |
| 3. | "Feel Something" | 6:20 |
| 4. | "Real Deal" | 5:27 |
| 5. | "Non-Stop American" | 3:21 |
| 6. | "Repeat to Fade" | 4:00 |
| 7. | "Let It Be Gone" | 2:22 |
| 8. | "Young Things" | 4:00 |
| 9. | "Shadow Boxer" | 3:29 |
| 10. | "What's the Secret?" | 5:05 |
| 11. | "Alien" | 4:12 |
| 12. | "Sleep Tight" | 4:22 |
| Total length: | | 49:24 |

Deluxe edition bonus disc
| No. | Title | Length |
|---|---|---|
| 1. | "Wicked Heart" (extended version) | 4:26 |
| 2. | "Spiralling" (extended version) | 4:43 |
| 3. | "Young Things" (Live from Oslo in Hackney 28 October 2015) | 4:07 |
| 4. | "Non-Stop American" (Live from Oslo in Hackney 28 October 2015) | 3:40 |
| 5. | "Sleep Tight" (Live from Oslo in Hackney 28 October 2015) | 4:41 |
| 6. | "Spiralling" (Dan Sells Live at the Doghouse) | 2:52 |
| 7. | "Real Deal" (Dan Sells Live at the Doghouse) | 3:07 |
| 8. | "Shadow Boxer" (Dan Sells Live at the Doghouse) | 3:05 |
| 9. | "Wicked Hearts" (Studio Out-take) | 6:07 |
| 10. | "Got a Lot to Learn" (Studio Out-take) | 1:08 |
| 11. | "Non-Stop American" (Studio Out-take) | 1:18 |
| 12. | "Feel Something" (Studio Out-take) | 2:39 |
| 13. | "Alien" (Studio Out-take) | 7:17 |
| 14. | "Real Deal" (Studio Out-take) | 2:37 |
| 15. | "Unused" (Studio Out-take) | 1:15 |
| 16. | "Repeat to Fade" (Studio Out-take) | 12:21 |
| 17. | "Young Things" (Studio Out-take) | 3:34 |
| 18. | "What's The Secret" (Studio Out-take) | 2:55 |
| 19. | "Shadow Boxer" (Studio Out-take) | 1:18 |
| Total length: | | 73:10 |

== Personnel ==
- Dan Gillespie-Sells – vocals, guitars
- Richard Jones – bass guitar
- Kevin Jeremiah – guitars
- Ciaran Jeremiah – keyboards/Hammond organ
- Paul Stewart – drums

== Charts ==
| Chart (2016) | Peak position |
|---|---|
| Scottish Albums (Official Charts) | 51 |
| UK Albums (Official Charts) | 47 |
