= Taste (Sophie Ellis-Bextor song) =

Single by Sophie Ellis-Bextor

from the album Perimenopop
- Released: 9 May 2025
- Genre: Dance-pop
- Length: 2:50
- Label: Decca
- Composers: Sophie Ellis-Bextor; Jon Shave; Uzoechi Emenike
- Producer: Jon Shave

Sophie Ellis-Bextor singles chronology
"Vertigo" (2025)	"Taste" (2025)	"Dolce Vita" (2025)

Visualiser video
- "Taste" on YouTube

"Taste" is a song by English singer and songwriter Sophie Ellis-Bextor. It was released on 9 May 2025, through Decca Records, as the fourth single from her eighth studio album, Perimenopop (2025).

== Composition and release ==
"Taste" was written by Sophie Ellis-Bextor, MNEK, and Jon Shave, with the latter serving as the producer of the song. It was released alongside the album announcement on 9 May.

With 'Taste', I collaborated with MNEK and Jon Shave to write a playful, flirtatious pop song about chemistry. What can really make you want to be around someone is when their taste, what they like in life, is something you become addicted to. You want to experience all delights with them and share it with them as everything they introduce you to feels just right. All your senses feel alive and awake – like the full flavour of life is realised. Chef's kiss.

— Ellis-Bextor explaining the meaning of the track, via Dork magazine

== Promotion ==
A lyric video was released alongside the song on 9 May, while an official visualiser directed by Jamie Michael Korn premiered on 23 May. Ellis-Bextor partnered with coffee liqueur Tia Maria for an all-year campaign titled "Shake Up The Taste", which highlights the song and promotes the brand’s connection to espresso martinis. She created her own twist on the Espresso Martini, the "Sophie's Tia Banana-Tini" recipe, as the focus of the campaign. The Tia Maria and Sophie Ellis-Bextor partnership launched on 3 June across Tia Maria's digital and social platforms.

== Personnel ==
Credits adapted from Apple Music.

- Sophie Ellis-Bextor – vocals, composer
- Jon Shave – producer, composer
- Uzoechi Emenike – background vocals, composer
- David Wrench – mixing engineer
- Matt Colton – mastering engineer
- Richard Jones – bass

== Charts ==
Chart performance for "Taste"
Chart (2025)	Peak position
UK Singles Downloads (OCC)	80
UK Singles Sales (OCC)	82

== Release history ==
"Taste" release history
Region	Date	Format(s)	Label	Ref.
Various	9 May 2025	Digital download; streaming	Decca Records	
