= Everybody's Talking About Jamie (soundtrack) =

Everybody's Talking About Jamie (Original Motion Picture Soundtrack)

Soundtrack album by Various artists
- Released: 10 September 2021
- Recorded: 2019–2021
- Genre: Film soundtrack
- Length: 55:56
- Label: Island; New Regency
- Producer: Tom MacRae; Dan Gillespie Sells

Everybody's Talking About Jamie (Original Motion Picture Soundtrack) is the soundtrack album to the 2021 film based on the eponymous stage musical. Dan Gillespie Sells and Tom MacRae, who wrote the music, book and lyrics for the musical, wrote, composed and produced the album. The soundtrack album was released by Island Records and New Regency Music on 10 September 2021, the same day as its U.S. release. Though mostly excludes five of the musical numbers from the stage play, the album features an additional song "This Was Me", performed by Richard E. Grant and Holly Johnson. The soundtrack includes contributions from Becky Hill, Todrick Hall, Sophie Ellis-Bextor, (Note: Ellis-Bextor had previously recorded a stage number for the concept album in 2017.) Chaka Khan and the Feeling, alongside the film's musical numbers. The album was well received by critics and audiences.

== Development ==
According to Sells, "each character had its own sound" and he wanted to "explore what each character's version of their pop star was". He further opined that "The whole piece is written in the pop vernacular for two reasons. We wrote it for a working-class audience, the ordinary folk who listened to ordinary music that you hear on the radio." Sells added pop music is "incredibly sophisticated and it draws you in and there are no barriers for that". Tom MacRae, on the lyric writing process, had stated in an interview to Script, inscribing:

"Dan would write a tune. It'd be [hums a melody] and he'd record that. And I'd have all the gaps and then I record on my phone, and then I go away and listen to it until I'd learn the tune. And then I would just fill in the words and sing it out loud or sing in the shower, sing around the house. Because when you say it out loud, you realize that that sound just trips a little, that combination of constants is a bit too "bap-bap-bap" you just enter the vowel there. And that long note, you need an “ooh” sound for longer or we can't have a constant there and just make it really simple. And just finessing, finessing, finessing. Is there any way I can tell this idea and fewer syllables, that's where you're kind of driven."

The new song "This Was Me" (not included in the musical) explores on Jamie's mentor, Hugo and his backstory. Sells added that "It was the story about a mentor explaining to a young queer kid what it was to be queer in London in the ‘80s and early ‘90s with HIV and the AIDS epidemic. It was a song about the section 28 rules, the marches, the demonstrations where drag queens were always a part of. It was about the raids on queer venues by the police. We wanted to show that it was an embattled culture that was part of Hugo's history." Frankie Goes to Hollywood frontman Holly Johnson, recorded this track at the AIR Studios in London. At that point, he was unaware that the song would be a duet featuring Richard E. Grant, and he sang the whole track. When the final version was played, with Grant on the track, he thought that "it really adds something to the song. The texture of Grant's voice and the theatricality of it adds another dimension to it." Grant said that "The whole story of this man's love life is told in the space of a three-minute song. He's at an age when he's got more past than future ahead of him. To physically be back in these very private moments, it's wonderful for him at times but by the end, it's absolutely unbearable that he can't even look at it and has to look away." The track "He's My Boy" is a phrase featured in the documentary, said by Jamie's mother Martha. Sells added "the track speaks of motherhood in such a simple way we felt was necessary for her to have a voice".

Musical numbers from the stage play, which were excluded from the film and its soundtrack, include "The Legend of Coco Chanelle (and the Blood Red Dress)", "If I Met Myself Again", "Limited Edition Prom Night Special", "Ugly in This Ugly World", "Prom Song" and all reprises save for "It Means Beautiful".

== Track listing ==
All tracks are written by Tom MacRae and Dan Gillespie Sells.

Everybody's Talking About Jamie (Original Motion Picture Soundtrack) track listing
No.	Title	Performer(s)	Length
1.	"Don't Even Know It"	Max Harwood	3:11
2.	"Everything"	Becky Hill	3:48
3.	"Wall in My Head"	Max Harwood	3:56
4.	"Spotlight"	Lauren Patel	2:59
5.	"This Was Me"	Richard E. Grant; Holly Johnson	4:56
6.	"Work of Art"	Sharon Horgan; Max Harwood	2:11
7.	"Werk Girl"	Todrick Hall	3:09
8.	"Over the Top"	Grant; Beverley Knight	4:40
9.	"Everybody's Talking About Jamie"	Year 11	2:37
10.	"It Means Beautiful"	Patel	2:36
11.	"He's My Boy"	Sarah Lancashire	5:27
12.	"My Man, Your Boy"	Harwood; Lancashire	2:32
13.	"While You're Still Young"	Sophie Ellis-Bextor; The Feeling	3:03
14.	"Out of the Darkness (A Place Where We Belong)"	Harwood	3:47
15.	"When the Time Comes"	Chaka Khan	3:18
16.	"Everybody's Talking About Jamie"	The Feeling	3:39
Total length:			55:56

== Chart performance ==
Chart performance for Everybody's Talking About Jamie (Original Motion Picture Soundtrack)
Chart (2021)	Peak position
UK Compilation Albums (OCC)	35
UK Digital Albums (OCC)	49
UK Soundtrack Albums (OCC)	4
