= Feels Like Christmas =

Single by The Feeling
- Released: 15 December 2008
- Length: 3:25
- Label: Universal
- Songwriter(s): The Feeling
- Producer(s): The Feeling

The Feeling singles chronology
"Join with Us" (2008)	"Feels Like Christmas" (2008)	"Set My World on Fire" (2011)

"Feels Like Christmas" is the tenth single released by the soft rock/pop group The Feeling as a one-off promotional single before the Christmas chart. It was released as a download-only single on 15 December 2008. The song was originally written by lead singer Dan Gillespie Sells several years before on his piano. He said on the band's official website: "I'm the opposite of the 'Bah Humbug' Christmas grump. I've always loved Christmas and the surrounding hullabaloo – especially the songs from Bing to Slade to Wizzard to Bing and Bowie. I wrote and recorded this one several years ago on the piano, but never intended it to be released so I kept it a secret. We added the drums and strings this year and then we thought it might be a good time to let people hear it to see what they thought!"

"Feels Like Christmas", perhaps because of its limited promotional release, only made it to number 139 on the UK Singles Chart.

== Charts ==
Chart (2008)	Peak position
UK Singles (OCC)	139
