= The Acoustic Album (EMI compilation) =

Compilation album by Various artists
- Released: 17 July 2006
- Genre: Various
- Label: EMI/Virgin Records

The Acoustic Album is a 2-disc compilation album released by EMI/Virgin Records in July 2006 to showcase songs heard on Virgin Radio.

== Track listing ==
Disc 1:

1. Jack Johnson – "Breakdown"
2. Corinne Bailey Rae – "Put Your Records On"
3. KT Tunstall – "Other Side of the World"
4. Keane – "Somewhere Only We Know"
5. The Feeling – "Sewn"
6. Snow Patrol – "Run"
7. Athlete – "Wires"
8. Coldplay – "Fix You"
9. Breaks Co-Op – "The Otherside"
10. Stephen Fretwell – "Emily"
11. Ryan Adams – "Wonderwall" (originally by Oasis)
12. Nick Drake – "Time Has Told Me"
13. Paul Weller – "Wild Wood"
14. Radiohead – "Fake Plastic Trees"
15. Richard Ashcroft – "Break the Night With Colour"
16. The Thrills – "Santa Cruz"
17. Supergrass – "St. Petersburg"
18. Air – "All I Need"
19. Doves – "Willow's Song"
20. Blur – "To the End"

Disc 2:

1. José González – "Heartbeats"
2. Katie Melua – "Nine Million Bicycles"
3. Eva Cassidy – "Fields of Gold"
4. Paul McCartney & Wings – "Bluebird"
5. Cat Stevens – "Moon Shadow"
6. Suzanne Vega – "Marlene on the Wall"
7. Crowded House – "Weather With You"
8. Oasis – "Songbird"
9. The Kooks – "She Moves in Her Own Way"
10. Turin Brakes – "Pain Killer"
11. Ben Harper – "Diamonds on the Inside"
12. Animal Liberation Orchestra – "Girl I Wanna Lay You Down"
13. Rufus Wainwright – "California"
14. Richard Hawley – "Just Like the Rain"
15. Fred Neil – "Everybody's Talkin'"
16. Kings of Convenience – "I Don't Know What I Can Save You From"
17. Norah Jones – "Come Away With Me"
18. Joss Stone – "Fell in Love With a Boy" (a cover of The White Stripes' "Fell in Love With a Girl")
19. Donavon Frankenreiter – "It Don't Matter"
20. Bernard Fanning – "Wish You Well"
21. Matt Costa – "Cold December"
22. R.E.M. – "The One I Love" (Live)
23. Nizlopi – "JCB Song"
