= Vertigo (Sophie Ellis-Bextor song) =

Single by Sophie Ellis-Bextor

from the album Perimenopop
- Released: 25 April 2025
- Genre: Electropop
- Length: 3:31
- Label: Decca
- Songwriters: Sophie Ellis-Bextor; James Greenwood; Hannah Robinson
- Producers: James Greenwood; Richard Jones (additional)

Sophie Ellis-Bextor singles chronology
"Relentless Love" (2025)	"Vertigo" (2025)	"Taste" (2025)

Visualiser video
- "Vertigo" on YouTube

"Vertigo" is a song by English singer and songwriter Sophie Ellis-Bextor. It was released on 25 April 2025, through Decca Records, as the third single from her eighth studio album, Perimenopop (2025).

== Background and release ==
"Vertigo" was written by Sophie Ellis-Bextor, Hannah Robinson, and James Greenwood, with the latter serving as the producer of the song, with additional production of Richard Jones.

An official visualiser was released alongside the song on 25 April via Ellis-Bextor official VEVO page on YouTube. It features pictures of Ellis-Bextor with the aesthetic of the new album.

== Reception ==
Bradley Stern of MuuMuse dubbed the song as "stunning", praising the composition, the string arrangement, and the "dramatic" bridge. Stern also noted that the production "whirling pulsations harken back to" Ellis-Bextor's 2011 record Make a Scene.

Writing for Jenesaispop, Jordí Bardají awarded the track as the site "Song of the Day". Bardají called the track an "electro-disco bop", describing it as an update on disco music, as it mixes the "melodies of ABBA with electropop", he also compared the song sound to Ellis-Bextor early records, such as Trip the Light Fantastic and Make a Scene.

== Personnel ==
Credits adapted from Apple Music.

- Sophie Ellis-Bextor — vocals, songwriter
- James Greenwood — producer, songwriter, recording engineer
- Hannah Robinson — songwriter
- David Arnold — string arranger
- David Wrench — mixing engineer
- Matt Colton — mastering engineer
- Richard Jones — additional producer
- Nick Wollage — recording engineer

== Charts ==
Chart performance for "Vertigo"
Chart (2025)	Peak position
UK Singles Downloads (OCC)	81
UK Singles Sales (OCC)	84

== Release history ==
"Vertigo" release history
Region	Date	Format(s)	Label	Ref.
Various	25 April 2025	Digital download; streaming	Decca Records	
