= Without You (The Feeling song) =

Single by The Feeling

from the album Join with Us
- B-side: "Play Don't Think"; "Different for Girls"
- Released: 14 April 2008
- Recorded: 2007
- Genre: Soft rock
- Length: 3:33 (radio edit); 4:49 (album version)
- Label: Island; Universal
- Songwriter(s): Dan Gillespie Sells; Richard Jones; Kevin Jeremiah; Ciaran Jeremiah; Paul Stewart
- Producer(s): The Feeling

The Feeling singles chronology
"I Thought It Was Over" (2008)	"Without You" (2008)	"Turn It Up" (2008)

"Without You" is the second single by British pop/rock band The Feeling to be released from their second studio album Join with Us . The band recorded the song in their live set each night during their tour of the UK from 7 March 2008 to 20 March 2008—these recordings became available to download at the time of the single's release. It peaked at number 53 on the UK Singles Chart.

== Music video ==
Dan Gillespie Sells (centre) in "Without You" video

The music video accompanying the song shows Gillespie Sells, frontman in the group, playing a Russian cosmonaut with the rest of the band members playing other roles.

Ciaran Jeremiah describes the band's roles in the video on the band's website. He describes himself as a "scientific-space-boffin", while "Paul is a soldier, Richard is a fellow lab-boffin, and Kev is a photographer."

== Formats and track listings ==
CD single (Released 21 April 2008)

1. "Without You" – 4:48
2. "Play, Don't Think" – 4:15
3. "Different for Girls" (Joe Jackson cover) – 3:29
4. "I Thought It Was Over" (Tom Middleton Mix) – 7:24
5. "Without You" (official music video)

7" blue vinyl (Released 21 April 2008)

1. "Without You" – 4:48
2. "Play Don't Think" – 4:15

Digital EP (Released 18 April 2008)

1. "Without You" – 4:48
2. "Play, Don't Think" – 4:15
3. "Different for Girls" – 3:29
4. "I Thought It Was Over" (Tom Middleton Mix) – 7:24

Digital download (Released 14 April 2008)

1. "Without You" (radio edit) – 3:34

== Charts ==
Chart (2008)	Peak position
Scotland (OCC)	28
Switzerland Airplay (Swiss Hitparade)	31
UK Singles (OCC)	53
