= Freedom of the Night =

2024 single by Sophie Ellis-Bextor

Single by Sophie Ellis-Bextor

from the album Perimenopop
- Released: 18 October 2024
- Genre: Dance-pop; disco
- Length: 3:12
- Label: Decca
- Songwriter(s): Sophie Ellis-Bextor; Richard Stannard; Duck Blackwell; Shura
- Producer(s): Blackwell; David Wrench; Chris Greatti; Richard Jones; Stannard

Sophie Ellis-Bextor singles chronology
"Ready for Your Love" (2024)	"Freedom of the Night" (2024)	"Relentless Love" (2025)

Music video
- "Freedom of the Night" on YouTube

"Freedom of the Night" is a song by English singer and songwriter Sophie Ellis-Bextor. It was released on 18 October 2024, through Decca Records, as the lead single from her eighth studio album, Perimenopop (2025).

== Background ==
Following the resurgence of her 2001 song "Murder on the Dancefloor" after its inclusion in the 2023 film Saltburn, Ellis-Bextor signed a record deal with Universal Music Group. Her first major-label single in 14 years, "Freedom of the Night", was released under Decca Records. On 20 October 2024, she performed the song live for the first time on the British dance competition programme, Strictly Come Dancing.

== Music video ==
The music video was directed by Sophie Muller and Theo Adams and filmed at London's Rivoli Ballroom. It serves as a continuation to the music video for "Murder on the Dancefloor" (also directed by Muller) where Ellis-Bextor, described as a fierce "dance mom", is determined to see her daughter win at a competitive dance gala. Colin Stinton reprised his role from the "Murder on the Dancefloor" video as one of the judges in the competition. The video premiered on Ellis-Bextor's YouTube channel on 25 October 2024.

== Charts ==
Chart performance for "Freedom of the Night"
Chart (2024)	Peak position
Lithuania Airplay (TopHit)	66
Russia Airplay (TopHit)	96
UK Singles Downloads (OCC)	5
UK Singles Sales (OCC)	8
