= Four Stops and Home =

EP by The Feeling
- Released: 10 October 2006
- Genre: Rock, pop, soft rock
- Length: 19:29
- Label: Island

The Feeling chronology
| Twelve Stops and Home (2006) | Four Stops and Home (2006) | Join With Us (2008) |

Four Stops and Home is the debut EP by Sussex rock band The Feeling. It was released in October 2006, four months after their debut album Twelve Stops and Home, and features two tracks from that album as well as two previously unreleased songs. Critical reception to the album was mixed, with IGN stating it was "a solid enough glimpse into the sound of The Feeling", while PopMatters described it as "squarely middle of the road", and "a straightforward grab at radio recognition."

== Track listing ==
1. "Sewn" – 5:55
2. "Helicopter" – 3:20
3. "When I Return" – 4:08
4. "All You Need to Do" – 4:11
5. "Sewn" (video)
