= Relentless Love =

Single by Sophie Ellis-Bextor

from the album Perimenopop
- Released: 28 March 2025
- Genre: Disco
- Length: 4:03
- Label: Decca
- Composers: Sophie Ellis-Bextor; Samuel Robert Knowles; Baz Kaye; Janée Millicent Lucy Bennett
- Producers: Karma Kid; Baz Kaye; Richard Jones (additional)

Sophie Ellis-Bextor singles chronology
"Freedom of the Night" (2024)	"Relentless Love" (2025)	"Vertigo" (2025)

Visualiser video
- "Relentless Love" on YouTube

"Relentless Love" is a song by English singer and songwriter Sophie Ellis-Bextor. It was released on 28 March 2025, through Decca Records, as the second single from her eighth studio album, Perimenopop (2025).

== Background and release ==
"Relentless Love" was written by Sophie Ellis-Bextor, Samuel Robert Knowles, Janée Millicent Lucy Bennett, and Baz Kaye. The track was co-produced by Kaye and Knowles (under his stage name Karma Kid), with additional production by Richard Jones. In the single's press release, Ellis-Bextor said of the track:

“Relentless love came from my love of fun fairs and the way that falling in love and going on a ride can be a similar thrill, Ferris wheels, roller coasters… all of them can make your perception of reality a little wonky and give you a rush. They are sometimes unpredictable but also an exciting way to shift your perspective for a little minute. Plus, it’s a great place for a date… hence the line ‘you know it’s sweet as caramel, sitting beside you on this carousel’. There’s definitely a romance in getting on a ride together and seeing where it will take you.”

— Ellis-Bextor on the track meaning, via Dork Magazine

It was released alongside an accompanying visualizer on July 25, 2025. "Relentless Love" serves as the opening track on Perimenopop.

== Reception ==
Upon its release, "Relentless Love" was met with positive reviews from music critics. Jordi Bardají of Jenesaispop praised the disco track, dubbing it "glorious".

Daisy Carter of DIY called the track a "dazzling" comeback for Ellis-Bextor, describing it as "another irresistibly danceable slice of disco-pop". Writing for Hit Channel, Echo Langford praised the song, calling it "a bold reminder of why Sophie Ellis-Bextor remains an icon in the dance-pop realm", while dubbing the single "an instant standout in her discography". Langford went further highlighting the track "mesmerizing" production, alongside Ellis-Bextor "ability to craft infectious melodies" with her "signature disco-pop elegance".

Jo Forrest of TotalNtertainment gave Rentless Love a positive review, calling it a joyous song, and describing its sound as "a buoyant disco-infused funk-pop track that builds through catchy grooves and luminous synths to an energetic and euphoric chorus."

== Personnel ==
Credits adapted from Apple Music.

- Sophie Ellis-Bextor — vocals, composer
- Samuel Robert Knowles a.k.a. Karma Kid — producer, composer, synthetizer, drum programming
- Baz Kaye — producer, composer, synthesizer, guitar, piano
- Richard Jones — additional producer
- Janée Millicent Lucy Bennett — composer
- Jackson Ellis-Leach — drums
- Guy Pratt — bass
- Gioele Nuzzo — percussion
- David Wrench — mixing engineer
- Matt Colton — mastering engineer

== Charts ==
Chart performance for "Relentless Love"
Chart (2025)	Peak position
UK Singles Downloads (OCC)	42
UK Singles Sales (OCC)	47

== Release history ==
"Relentless Love" release history
Region	Date	Format(s)	Label	Ref.
Various	28 March 2025	Digital download; streaming	Decca Records	
