= Fill My Little World =

2005 single by the Feeling

- Standard artwork for 2006 re-release

Single by the Feeling

from the album Twelve Stops and Home
- B-side: "All You Need to Do"; "Not Be Turned"; "One Thing That I Want"
- Released: 7 November 2005
- Genre: Pop rock
- Length: 4:07 (album version); 3:39 (radio edit)
- Label: Island
- Songwriters: Dan Gillespie Sells; Richard Jones; Kevin Jeremiah; Ciaran Jeremiah; Paul Stewart
- Producer: The Feeling

The Feeling singles chronology
"Fill My Little World" (2005)	"Sewn" (2006)
"Sewn" (2006)	"Fill My Little World" (2006)	"Never Be Lonely" (2006)

"Fill My Little World" is a song by English rock band the Feeling, originally released in the UK on 7 November 2005 as their debut single but was unable to chart due to chart rules. The following year, it was re-released as a digital single in the UK, entering the UK Singles Chart at number 28 on 21 May 2006 based on download sales alone. The following week, it climbed to number 10 after a physical single became available on 22 May.

== Music videos ==
The video for the song has the band performing in a minibeast, a reptile and an amphibian cage.

== Track listings ==
UK CD and 7-inch single (2005)

1. "Fill My Little World" – 4:07
2. "All You Need to Do" – 3:53

UK limited-edition 7-inch single (2006)

A. "Fill My Little World"
B. "Not Be Turned"

Digital download EP (2006)

1. "Fill My Little World" (edit) – 3:39
2. "Not Be Turned" – 3:39
3. "One Thing That I Want" – 3:20

== Charts ==
=== Weekly charts ===
Chart (2006)	Peak position
Ireland (IRMA)	31
Netherlands (Dutch Top 40)	34
Netherlands (Single Top 100)	89
Scottish Singles Sales (Official Charts)	18
Switzerland Airplay (Swiss Hitparade)	65
UK Singles (Official Charts)	10

=== Year-end charts ===
Chart (2006)	Position
UK Singles (OCC)	64

== Certifications ==
Region	Certification	Certified units/sales
United Kingdom (BPI)	Gold	400,000^{‡}
^{‡} Sales+streaming figures based on certification alone.
