= Al Murray's Happy Hour =

British television chat show (2007–2008)

- Directed by: Peter Orton
- Presented by: Al Murray
- Opening theme: "Don't Stop Me Now" by Queen
- Country of origin: United Kingdom
- Original language: English
- No. of series: 3
- No. of episodes: 29 (list of episodes)

Production
- Production location: The London Studios
- Running time: 60 minutes (including adverts)

Original release
- Network: ITV
- Release: 13 January 2007 – 24 October 2008

Al Murray's Happy Hour is a British comedy talk show presented by comedian Al Murray and produced by Avalon TV. The first series aired in early 2007 on ITV.

The programme is characterised by Murray's stand-up, guest interviews and live music, and received a British Comedy Award.

== Format ==
The programme has a large studio audience, which Murray interacts with and often identifies any celebrities in the audience, such as Vanessa Feltz and Uri Geller, and the members of the 'Pub of the Week'.

Murray points out a regular audience member on the show by the name of "Big Bob". who has a theme song, after which, Al says, " and his wife Anne", who is considerably smaller than her husband. Big Bob's full name is Bob Carlisle and he first got involved with the show after winning a radio show competition.

He will then give a speech about the greatness of Britain. During this segment, Al will say something along the lines of 'You see, Britain is all about rules. If we had no rules where would we be?' The audience then shouts out 'France!' 'If we had too many rules where would we be?' 'Germany!' For the third time of enquiry it usually features another country, For example: 'If we had rules forcing you to take a nap in the afternoon where would we be? Spain.' – or 'If we had rules forcing us to eat raw fish where would we be? Japan.' He then moves on to say that Queen is the greatest rock band on the planet, before announcing he hasn't got Queen (apart from at the end of series 2), but has a different band instead, and reveals "who's in the loos".

After his speech, there is a commercial break, before interviewing the three guests. In the middle of the interviews, before a commercial break, the musical guest will often sing one of their own songs. Often when a female guest comes on, his friend 'Gary' phones him up (or vice versa), or makes contact in a variety of ways, and asks the guest to say filthy, then Al tells Gary he owes him £12. At various times during each episode, he will ask the guest about their work. At any moment there is a reference to their earnings, you will hear the "keerrrrrching" of a till. Also, there is a reference to his ex-wife and his faithful dog Ramrod (who is now dead, and comes into the show on wheels.) Sometimes, when guests come on, e.g. when Jason Gardiner from Dancing on Ice came on, he talked about the musical Cats, which he had starred in, and Al made Ramrod's eyes glow red and growl.

At the end of each episode, after the interviews, he will join the musical guest in singing a Queen song. In the final episode of the first series, this was the cast of the musical about Queen – "We Will Rock You", during which the band Queen made an appearance and did a special performance. Every episode ends with Murray saying "please take your glasses back to the bar".

Throughout interviews in the second series, Murray acknowledges the stereotypical leading questions used by chatshow hosts to allow their guests to 'plug' their product or latest project by referring to these types of question as 'blah blah'.

In an interview with Channel 4's Richard & Judy in January 2007, Al Murray revealed that he rehearses celebrity interviews, with members of the staff taking the role as the celebrity guest, who answer the questions hopefully in the same manner as the guests will answer them. This gives Al a bit of help with regards to how to approach each interview, and how he can gain comedy moments from each interview.

== Home release ==
The first series of Happy Hour was released on Region 2 DVD on 6 October 2008. The second series was released on 16 March 2009.
