= Katherine Gillespie Sells =

British activist

Katherine Gillespie Sells MBE
- Born: 3 February 1951 (age 74)
- Occupation(s): Psychotherapist, disability rights activist, LGBT rights activist

Katherine Gillespie Sells (b. 3 February 1951) MBE is a psychotherapist, writer, disability rights campaigner and LGBT rights campaigner from the United Kingdom. In 1990, she founded REGARD, a national, volunteer-run organisation of disabled lesbians, gay men, bisexuals and transgender people.

== Career ==
Sells was a ward sister at Barnet General Hospital when she became disabled as a result of a splinter in her finger, which led to septicaemia, a multi-day coma and the loss of the finger. This led to spinal thecal arachnoiditis that put her in a wheelchair. She re-trained as a teacher, completing a Certificate in Education at Middlesex University. Sells was Joint Head of Training with Jane Campbell (later Baroness Campbell of Surbiton) at Disability Resource Team in Camden.

== Works ==
She co-authored:

- The Sexual Politics of Disability with Tom Shakespeare and Dominic Davies
- She Dances to Different Drums.

== Recognition ==
- Stonewall Hero of the Year 2010 (nominated)
- MBE for services to disabled lesbian, gay, bisexual and transgender people in the Queen's Birthday Honours List (2011)

== Personal life ==
Gillespie Sells was born on 3 February 1951. She has three sons, one of whom is singer/songwriter Dan Gillespie Sells. Her marriage ended while her first two children were young and she came out as a lesbian. She raised her children with her ex-partner Dr. Dilis, who was the biological mother of another son, and coparenting with her ex-husband.
