= Never Be Lonely =

2006 single by the Feeling

Single by the Feeling

from the album Twelve Stops and Home
- B-side: "All You Need to Do"; "This Time" (demo)
- Released: 28 August 2006
- Genre: Soft rock
- Length: 3:31
- Label: Island
- Songwriters: Dan Gillespie Sells; Richard Jones; Kevin Jeremiah; Ciaran Jeremiah; Paul Stewart
- Producers: The Feeling; Andy Green

The Feeling singles chronology
"Fill My Little World" (2006)	"Never Be Lonely" (2006)	"Love It When You Call" (2006)

Music video
- "Never Be Lonely" on YouTube

"Never Be Lonely" is a song by English rock band the Feeling. It is the third single from their 2006 debut album, Twelve Stops and Home, and was released on 28 August 2006. It entered the UK Singles Chart at number 24 on 27 August 2006 based on download sales alone. The following week, it climbed to number 12 with additional physical sales. The song entered the top 10 of the UK Singles Chart during its third week, peaking at number nine.

The song was nominated for Best Track at the 2006 Q Awards, along with Arctic Monkeys' "I Bet You Look Good on the Dancefloor", Snow Patrol's "Chasing Cars", Gnarls Barkley's "Crazy" and Scissor Sisters' "I Don't Feel Like Dancin'". "Crazy" eventually won. The music video for the single was directed by Caswell Coggins.

== Track listings ==
UK CD single

1. "Never Be Lonely"
2. "All You Need to Do"
3. "This Time" (demo)

UK limited-edition 7-inch single

A. "Never Be Lonely"
B. "All You Need to Do"

Digital download

1. "Never Be Lonely" (acoustic) – 3:39

== Personnel ==
Personnel are adated from AllMusic.

- Lead vocals, guitar – Dan Gillespie Sells
- Guitar, vocals – Kevin Jeremiah
- Keyboards, vocals – Ciaran Jeremiah
- Bass guitar, vocals – Richard Jones
- Drums – Paul Stewart

== Charts ==
=== Weekly charts ===
Chart (2006)	Peak position
Ireland (IRMA)	31
Scottish Singles Sales (Official Charts)	16
UK Singles (Official Charts)	9

=== Year-end charts ===
Chart (2006)	Position
UK Singles (OCC)	69
