= Love It When You Call =

2006 single by the Feeling

Single by the Feeling

from the album Twelve Stops and Home
- B-side: 1. "The Child"; 2. "Don't Give Up" (acoustic); "Do You Want It?"
- Released: 20 November 2006
- Genre: Power pop
- Length: 3:34
- Label: Island; Universal
- Songwriter: The Feeling
- Producers: Andy Green; The Feeling

The Feeling singles chronology
"Never Be Lonely" (2006)	"Love It When You Call" (2006)	"Rosé" (2007)

Music video
- "Love It When You Call" on YouTube

Alternative covers
- 7-inch single cover

"Love It When You Call" is the fourth single from English pop band the Feeling's 2006 debut album, Twelve Stops and Home. The song was released on 20 November 2006 and peaked at No. 18 on the UK Singles Chart, becoming the band's fourth top-20 single.

The Feeling played this song live for Children in Need 2006. They also performed it as part of the BBC One New Year's Eve 2006 celebrations and at the Concert for Diana the following year.

== Music video ==
The video for the song (based on the film Casino) features the band dressed both as gangsters and FBI agents. One member of the gangsters makes a deal with the FBI, leading to a shoot-out at the end of the video.

== Track listings ==
UK CD single

1. "Love It When You Call"
2. "The Child"
3. "Don't Give Up" (acoustic version)
4. "Love It When You Call" (U-Myx)

UK 7-inch single

A. "Love It When You Call"
B. "Do You Want It?" (Late Night Shed Experiment)

== Charts ==
=== Weekly charts ===
Chart (2006)	Peak position
Ireland (IRMA)	32
Portugal (AFP)	43
Scotland Singles (OCC)	22
Switzerland Airplay (Swiss Hitparade)	46
UK Singles (OCC)	18
UK Airplay (Music Week)	1

=== Year-end charts ===
Chart (2006)	Position
UK Airplay (Music Week)	53

Chart (2007)	Position
UK Singles (OCC)	166

== Certifications ==
Region	Certification	Certified units/sales
United Kingdom (BPI)	Silver	200,000^{‡}
^{‡} Sales+streaming figures based on certification alone.

== Cover versions ==
In 2006, the song was parodied by British DJ Chris Moyles, when he recorded his own version, "The Davina McCall Song". Kerry Ellis included her version of the song on her debut album Anthems (2010).
