= Twelve Stops and Home =

Studio album by the Feeling
- Released: 5 June 2006
- Genres: Power pop; soft rock
- Length: 56:21
- Labels: Island, Cherrytree
- Producers: The Feeling, Chris Potter, Andy Green

The Feeling chronology
Twelve Stops and Home (2006)	Join with Us (2008)

Singles from Twelve Stops and Home
- 1. "Sewn" Released: 27 February 2006; 2. "Fill My Little World" Released: 22 May 2006; 3. "Never Be Lonely" Released: 28 August 2006; 4. "Love It When You Call" Released: 20 November 2006; 5. "Rosé" Released: 12 February 2007

Twelve Stops and Home is the debut studio album by English rock/pop band the Feeling, released on 5 June 2006. The album's title refers to the twelve stops on the Piccadilly line of the London Underground from Leicester Square to Bounds Green. Lead singer Dan Gillespie Sells grew up in Bounds Green and lived a short walk from the tube station.

== Reception ==
Professional ratings
Aggregate scores
Source	Rating
Metacritic	58/100
Review scores
Source	Rating
AllMusic	4/5 stars
BBC	(unfavourable)
Drowned in Sound	1/10
NME	4/10
The Observer	5/5 stars
Yahoo! Music	1/10

The album was divisive among music critics. It gained a five-star review from The Observer, but garnered a scathing 1/10 from both Drowned in Sound and Yahoo! Music. On Metacritic, the album has a weighted average score of 58 out of 100 based on 7 reviews, indicating "mixed or average reviews".

Five singles were released from the album, including the top 10 hits, "Sewn", "Fill My Little World" and "Never Be Lonely". "Sewn" was also featured on the FIFA 07 soundtrack.

== Chart performance ==
Twelve Stops and Home placed at number one on the UK Amazon and iTunes charts. It charted in the UK Albums Chart on 11 June 2006 at number 2, below Smile... It Confuses People by Sandi Thom. In its second week, it descended to number 3 following Smile... It Confuses People at number 2, and the second Keane album, Under the Iron Sea.

In its first week on sale in the UK it sold 43,304 copies and in its second week it sold 39,000 copies. The album has been certified 3× Platinum in the UK, selling almost 900,000 copies and has sold around 1.5 million copies worldwide.

It charted at number 20 on the Top Heatseekers in the United States.

== Track listing ==
All songs were written and produced by the Feeling except where noted.

UK and international edition
No.	Title	Producer(s)	Length
1.	"I Want You Now"		3:47
2.	"Never Be Lonely"	The Feeling; Andy Green	3:31
3.	"Fill My Little World"		4:07
4.	"Kettle's On"		4:07
5.	"Sewn"	The Feeling; Andy Green	5:55
6.	"Anyone"		4:10
7.	"Strange"	The Feeling; Andy Green	4:21
8.	"Love It When You Call"		3:35
9.	"Rosé"		4:16
10.	"Same Old Stuff"		5:10
11.	"Helicopter"		3:18
12.	"Blue Piccadilly" (After the song "Blue Piccadilly" ends, studio chatter can be heard. At 6:17 the hidden track "Miss You" starts)		9:55
Total length:			56:21

US edition
No.	Title	Producer(s)	Length
1.	"Sewn"	The Feeling; Andy Green	5:55
2.	"Never Be Lonely"	The Feeling; Andy Green	3:31
3.	"Love It When You Call"		3:35
4.	"Fill My Little World"		4:07
5.	"Kettle's On"		4:07
6.	"I Want You Now"		3:47
7.	"Strange"	The Feeling; Andy Green	4:21
8.	"Anyone"		4:10
9.	"Rosé"		4:16
10.	"Same Old Stuff"		5:10
11.	"Helicopter"		3:18
12.	"Blue Piccadilly" (After the song "Blue Piccadilly" ends, studio chatter can be heard. At 6:17 the hidden track "Miss You" starts)		9:55
Total length:			56:21

12th anniversary edition: Disc one
No.	Title	Producer(s)	Length
1.	"I Want You Now" (2018 Remaster)		3:47
2.	"Never Be Lonely" (2018 Remaster)	The Feeling; Andy Green	3:31
3.	"Fill My Little World" (2018 Remaster)		4:07
4.	"Kettle's On" (2018 Remaster)		4:07
5.	"Sewn" (2018 Remaster)	The Feeling; Andy Green	5:55
6.	"Anyone" (2018 Remaster)		4:10
7.	"Strange" (2018 Remaster)	The Feeling; Andy Green	4:21
8.	"Love It When You Call" (2018 Remaster)		3:35
9.	"Rosé" (2018 Remaster)		4:16
10.	"Same Old Stuff" (2018 Remaster)		5:10
11.	"Helicopter" (2018 Remaster)		3:18
12.	"Blue Piccadilly" (2018 Remaster - After the song "Blue Piccadilly" ends, studio chatter can be heard. At 6:17 the hidden track "Miss You" starts)		9:55
Total length:			56:21

12th anniversary edition: Disc Two – The Ones That Got Away
No.	Title	Length
1.	"Fill My Little Fanfare"	1:48
2.	"Modern Classic" (2005 Demo)	5:20
3.	"Still You Want More" (Original Demo)	4:05
4.	"All You Need to Do"	3:53
5.	"Funny Cigarette"	3:10
6.	"When I Return"	4:04
7.	"Not Be Turned"	3:41
8.	"Bullshit Fucks the World"	3:11
9.	"Sun Is Shining"	3:04
10.	"This Time" (Original Demo)	3:08
11.	"Rosé" (Unplugged at Abbey Road for Burberry Body)	4:32
12.	"The Child"	3:14
13.	"Spare Me" (original demo)	4:42
14.	"Join with Us" (original demo)	4:31
15.	"One Thing That I Want" (Includes hidden track "Do You Want It? (Late Night Shed Experiment)")	6:47
Total length:		59:10

12th anniversary edition: Disc Three – Demos and Remixes
No.	Title	Length
1.	"This Time" (Orchestral Version)	3:36
2.	"I Want You Now" (Demo)	4:01
3.	"Fill My Little World" (Demo)	4:00
4.	"Kettle's On" (Demo)	4:28
5.	"Sewn" (Demo)	5:39
6.	"Anyone" (Demo)	4:31
7.	"Strange" (Demo)	4:52
8.	"Love It When You Call" (Demo)	3:49
9.	"Same Old Stuff" (Demo)	5:24
10.	"Helicopter" (Demo)	3:29
11.	"Sewn" (Dan's Original Version)	4:49
12.	"All You Need to Do" (Dan's Original Version)	4:23
13.	"Make Me Pay" (Dan's Original Version)	4:36
14.	"Unfinished Background" (Demo)	3:45
15.	"Don't Give Up" (Acoustic Version)	4:08
16.	"Video Killed the Radio Star" (Live at the Hospital)	4:08
17.	"Love It When You Call" (Chorale Version)	3:38
18.	"Love It When You Call" (Lo-Fi-Funk Remix - Includes hidden track "Baker Street (Instrumental)")	5:05
Total length:		78:21

12th anniversary edition: Disc Four – Documentary DVD
No.	Title	Length
1.	"The Feeling on Ice" (Documentary)	43:55

== Personnel ==
=== Musicians ===
- Lead vocals, guitar – Dan Gillespie Sells
- Guitar, vocals – Kevin Jeremiah
- Keyboards, vocals – Ciaran Jeremiah
- Bass guitar, vocals – Richard Jones (5)
- Drums – Paul Stewart (4)
- Backing vocals – Sonny Jones (7)

=== Technical ===
- Producers – The Feeling
- Co-producer – Andy Green (2, 5, 7)
- Engineers – Andy Green (2, 5, 7, 8), Cenzo Townshend (tracks: 1, 3, 4, 6, 9 to 12)
- Mixers – Chris Potter (1, 3, 4, 6, 9 to 12), Mark "Spike" Stent (2, 5, 7, 8)
- Cover photography – Sølve Sundsbø
- Cover (post production) – Digital Light
- Designer, art director – Tappin Gofton

== Charts ==
=== Weekly charts ===
Chart (2006)	Peak position
Belgian Albums (Ultratop Flanders)	86
Dutch Albums (Album Top 100)	81
German Albums (Offizielle Top 100)	94
Irish Albums (IRMA)	35
Scottish Albums (Official Charts)	5
UK Albums (Official Charts)	2

=== Year-end charts ===
Chart (2006)	Position
UK Albums (OCC)	21
Chart (2007)	Position
UK Albums (OCC)	88

== Certifications ==
Region	Certification	Certified units/sales
United Kingdom (BPI)	3× Platinum	900,000^{‡}
^{‡} Sales+streaming figures based on certification alone.
