= Join with Us (song) =

Single by The Feeling

from the album Join with Us
- B-side: "She's Gone"; "Spitting Feathers"
- Released: 15 September 2008
- Genre: Power pop
- Length: 3:32 radio edit); 3:48 (video edit); 4:40 (album version)
- Label: Universal
- Songwriter(s): Dan Gillespie Sells; Richard Jones; Kevin Jeremiah; Ciaran Jeremiah; Paul Stewart
- Producer(s): The Feeling

The Feeling singles chronology
"Turn It Up" (2008)	"Join with Us" (2008)	"Feels Like Christmas" (2008)

"Join with Us" is the fourth and final single taken from The Feeling's second album of the same name and was released on 15 September 2008. It was revealed on Capital Radio that the band's 24-hour challenge on 9 July was to film the video in one day. Part of the video features the band performing at a fairground.

The song was originally written at the time when the band were performing in the Alps, and was included on a very rare demo disc along with demo versions of other Twelve Stops And Home tracks. It was also added to the set list for the Twelve Stops and Home tour, and subsequently features on the live double CDs that contain audio versions of the tour in different venues, such as Shepherd's Bush Empire and Cambridge Corn Exchange.

"Join with Us" was featured on a Toyota Auris advert in Summer 2008.

The Feeling performed "Join with Us" at the London 2012 Party shown on BBC One as well as a cover of David Bowie's "Heroes".

== Formats and track listing ==
CD single (Released 15 September 2008)

1. "Join with Us" – 4:40
2. "She's Gone" (Hall & Oates cover) – 5:14
3. "Spitting Feathers" – 6:23

7" red vinyl (Released 15 September 2008)

1. "Join with Us" – 4:40
2. "Spitting Feathers" – 6:23

Digital EP (Released 15 September 2008)

1. "Join with Us" – 4:40
2. "She's Gone" – 5:24
3. "Spitting Feathers" – 6:22

Digital download (Released 8 September 2008)

1. "Join with Us" (radio edit) – 3:32

== Charts ==
In February 2008, "Join with Us" entered the UK Singles Chart at No. 196 on downloads alone. When the single was released on 15 September 2008 only in the United Kingdom, it became the band's first single to fail to dent the UK Top 75, peaking at No. 87.

Chart (2008)	Peak position
Scotland (OCC)	20
UK Singles (OCC)	87
