= Holy moly =

Exclamation of surprise

Holy moly (also spelled holy moley, or holey moley) is an exclamation of surprise that dates from at least 1890. It is a reduplication of 'holy', perhaps as a minced oath, a cleaned-up version of a taboo phrase such as "Holy Moses", or "Holy Mary". There is no evidence connecting the phrase to Moly, a sacred herb of Greek mythology.

It was popularized in the U.S. as an expression often used by Billy Batson, the alter ego of Captain Marvel, a superhero created for Fawcett Publications.
