= Sewn (song) =

2006 single by the Feeling

Single by the Feeling

from the album Twelve Stops and Home
- B-side: "Sun Is Shining"; "When I Return"; "Funny Cigarette"
- Released: 27 February 2006
- Genre: Rock
- Length: 5:57 (album version); 3:45 (radio edit)
- Label: Island
- Songwriters: Dan Gillespie Sells; Richard Jones; Kevin Jeremiah; Ciaran Jeremiah; Paul Stewart
- Producers: The Feeling; Andy Green

The Feeling singles chronology
"Fill My Little World" (2005)	"Sewn" (2006)	"Fill My Little World" (2006)

"Sewn" is the first properly released single of British rock group the Feeling, following the 7-inch only single "Fill My Little World" (which would later become a full single release itself). "Sewn" was released in the UK on 27 February 2006 and entered the UK Singles Chart at No. 7 the following week. The song gained the band a lot of support and went on to become one of the most successful songs of the year on British radio, with Chris Moyles of BBC Radio 1 championing the band.

"Sewn" was recorded in sibling band members Kevin and Ciaran Jeremiah's dad's shed, known as "Kevin and Ciaran's mum and dad's outbuilding". Four Stops and Home, the Feeling's debut release for American audiences, incorporates "Sewn" as its leading track as well as its single artwork. In August 2006, on the American iTunes Store, "Sewn" was a single of the week.

== Music video ==
The music video of Sewn contains the band members playing the song as they are getting wrapped up in cords, wires and ropes.

== Track listings ==
UK CD single

1. "Sewn" – 5:57
2. "Sun Is Shining" – 3:06
3. "When I Return" – 4:06

7-inch single

A. "Sewn" – 5:57
B. "Funny Cigarette" – 3:06

Digital download

1. "Sewn" (radio edit) – 3:45

== Charts ==
=== Weekly charts ===
Chart (2006)	Peak position
Austria (Ö3 Austria Top 40)	68
Belgium (Ultratip Bubbling Under Flanders)	9
Germany (GfK)	85
Italy (FIMI)	46
Netherlands (Dutch Top 40)	23
Netherlands (Single Top 100)	44
Portugal (AFP)	27
Scottish Singles Sales (Official Charts)	13
UK Singles (Official Charts)	7

=== Year-end charts ===
Chart (2006)	Position
UK Singles (OCC)	80
