= Together We Were Made =

Studio album by the Feeling
- Released: 20 June 2011
- Genres: Pop; electro rock
- Length: 52:24; 97:54 (Double Album Edition)
- Labels: UMG, Island
- Producers: The Feeling, The Bullitts

The Feeling chronology
Join with Us (2008)	Together We Were Made (2011)	Singles (2006–2011) (2011)

Singles from Together We Were Made
- 1. "Set My World on Fire" Released: 1 May 2011; 2. "A Hundred Sinners (Come and Get It)" Released: 22 August 2011

Together We Were Made is the third studio album by the British rock band the Feeling, released on 20 June 2011.

== Critical reception ==
Professional ratings
Review scores
Source	Rating
AllMusic	3.5/5 stars
Drowned in Sound	5/10 stars
Melodic.net	link
NME	1/10 stars
The Tune	3.3/5

The album received a mixed response from critics, garnering a rating of 4.5 out of 10 from reviews aggregator Any Decent Music?.

== Track listing ==
No.	Title	Length
1.	"Set My World On Fire"	3:57
2.	"Dance for the Lights" (featuring Róisín Murphy)	4:21
3.	"Another Soldier"	3:41
4.	"Leave Me Out of It" (featuring Sophie Ellis-Bextor)	4:24
5.	"Build a Home"	3:37
6.	"Searched Every Corner"	3:50
7.	"A Hundred Sinners (Come and Get It)"	3:40
8.	"Mr Grin"	3:54
9.	"Say No"	3:53
10.	"Back Where I Came From"	4:18
11.	"Another Life"	3:52
12.	"Love and Care"	4:37
13.	"Undeniable"	8:48
Total length:		52:24

European bonus track
No.	Title	Length
14.	"Safety Dance"	2:38

Double edition bonus disc
No.	Title	Length
1.	"Easier Said Than Done"	4:08
2.	"Virtually Art" (featuring Betty Boo)	3:41
3.	"Care About Us"	2:47
4.	"Still You Want More"	4:12
5.	"1991"	3:39
6.	"Colder Than December"	4:10
7.	"Superstar"	3:18
8.	"Seek Asylum"	3:45
9.	"Over and Over"	3:52
10.	"Dia De Los Muertos"	3:49
11.	"Gravity"	4:23
12.	"Angel Face"	3:46
Total length:		45:30

== Charts ==
Chart (2011)	Peak position
Scottish Albums (Official Charts)	35
UK Albums (Official Charts)	22
