= I Thought It Was Over =

Single by The Feeling

from the album Join with Us
- B-side: "Don't Make It Easy"; "Colombia"
- Released: 11 February 2008
- Recorded: 2007
- Genre: Power pop; dance-rock
- Length: 3:33 (radio edit); 3:59 (album version)
- Label: Island; Universal
- Songwriter(s): Dan Gillespie Sells; Richard Jones; Kevin Jeremiah; Ciaran Jeremiah; Paul Stewart

The Feeling singles chronology
| "Rosé" (2007) | "I Thought It Was Over" (2008) | "Without You" (2008) |

"I Thought It Was Over" is a song performed by British band the Feeling for their second studio album, Join with Us. The song was released as the album's lead single on 11 February 2008 and peaked at number 9 on the UK Singles Chart. According to the band's website, the song is about a love affair taking place around the time of the fall of the Berlin Wall for many weeks surpasses.

The song's music video premiered on Channel 4 on 22 December 2007. The video features the band in a dilapidated building, where, according to drummer, Paul Stewart, "Things shake and electronics go weird, as if being visited by other-worldly beings."

== Formats and track listing ==
CD single (Released 11 February 2008)

1. "I Thought It Was Over" – 3:32
2. "Don't Make It Easy" – 2:55
3. "Colombia" – 4:06
4. "I Thought It Was Over" (official music video)

7" green vinyl (Released 11 February 2008)

1. "I Thought It Was Over" – 3:32
2. "Colombia" – 4:06

Digital download (Released 1 February 2008)

1. "I Thought It Was Over" (radio edit) – 3:32

Digital remixes EP (Released 1 February 2008)

1. "I Thought It Was Over" (Tom Middleton Vocal remix) – 7:30
2. "I Thought It Was Over" (Tom Middleton Dub remix) – 8:08

== Charts ==
=== Weekly charts ===
| Chart (2008) | Peak position |
|---|---|
| Austria (Ö3 Austria Top 40) | 67 |
| Scotland (OCC) | 6 |
| Switzerland Airplay (Schweizer Hitparade) | 76 |
| UK Singles (OCC) | 9 |

=== Year-end charts ===
| Chart (2008) | Position |
|---|---|
| UK Singles (OCC) | 141 |
