= David Arnold (conductor) =

English composer, conductor and record producer

David Arnold (born 1951) is an English composer, conductor and record producer.

He began to play percussion at the age of 12 and went on to study at the Royal College of Music in London. He eventually became principal percussionist with the Royal Philharmonic Orchestra, and was subsequently appointed professor at the Guildhall School of Music.

He has conducted many leading orchestras around the world, including the Royal Philharmonic, the London Philharmonic, BBC Philharmonic, RTÉ National Symphony Orchestra, and the Czech Philharmonic Orchestra. He is currently Associate Conductor of the Royal Philharmonic Concert Orchestra, a post he has held for more than 12 years.

Now concentrating on conducting, composing, arranging and producing, he also acts as a music consultant for concerts and recording. He has worked with a diverse range of artists in both classical and popular music. He has written and arranged for television and radio for many years, and has a huge library of musical arrangements.

Arnold wrote the original Classic FM jingle, including the many arrangements and variations that have been heard on the London-based radio station for 20 years, apart from a break of 18 months. The jingle package won the prestigious award for Station Imaging at the 2013 Arqiva Commercial Radio awards ceremony, marking 40 years of independent radio in Britain.

He has also written music for BBC World Service and for radio and television in the UK and elsewhere, including the orchestration of the Sky News HD music theme (originally composed by Kirk Zavieh and Charles Hodgkinson) and the current LBC and Smooth Radio network jingles.

He is not related to the British film composer David Arnold.
