= Join with Us (album) =

Studio album by the Feeling
- Released: 18 February 2008
- Genres: Power pop; soft rock
- Length: 54:38
- Labels: Island; Universal

The Feeling chronology
| Twelve Stops and Home (2006) | Join with Us (2008) | Together We Were Made (2011) |

Singles from Join with Us
- 1. "I Thought It Was Over" Released: 11 February 2008; 2. "Without You" Released: 14 April 2008; 3. "Turn It Up" Released: 7 July 2008; 4. "Join with Us" Released: 15 September 2008

Join with Us is the second full-length studio album from the British rock band the Feeling. It was released on 18 February 2008, preceded by the first single from the album, "I Thought It Was Over".

The album sold 41,676 copies in the UK during its first week, debuting at number 1 on the UK Albums Chart. This was lower than the first-week sales of their debut album Twelve Stops and Home, which sold 43,304 copies despite peaking at number 2.

== Cover art ==
The cover art was designed by Juno, a company who had previously produced artwork for Arctic Monkeys and The Zutons. The Feeling's covers and design is by Liz Harry, one third of the design team from Juno, but used this project to launch a solo design career.

== Release ==
The first 50,000 copies of the album were printed with an error in the booklet. The lyrics for "Don't Make Me Sad" were printed twice, and there are no lyrics printed for "Won't Go Away". Also, on these copies, the word "Connor", written either in the title of the song or in the lyrics itself is spelled with only one "n" as "Conor". However on the back of some copies, it is spelled as "Connor", while as "Conor" on others.

== Critical reception ==
Professional ratings
Review scores
| Source | Rating |
|---|---|
| AllMusic | 2.5/5 stars |
| Digital Spy | 4/5 stars |
| The Guardian | 2/5 stars |
| Hot Press | 3.5/5 |
| MusicOMH | 4/5 stars |
| Times Online | 3/5 stars |

Initial critical response to Join with Us was generally positive. At Metacritic, which assigns a normalised rating out of 100 to reviews from mainstream critics, the album received an average score of 66, based on 8 reviews.

== Chart performance ==
On 24 February 2008 Join with Us entered the UK Albums Chart at number 1, one place higher than the band's debut, Twelve Stops and Home. The following week the album dropped to number 11, then to 18 the week after.

In the UK, the album sold more than 160,000 copies, and was certified Gold.

== Track listing ==
| No. | Title | Length |
|---|---|---|
| 1. | "I Thought It Was Over" | 4:00 |
| 2. | "Without You" | 4:49 |
| 3. | "Join with Us" | 4:40 |
| 4. | "Spare Me" | 4:27 |
| 5. | "Turn It Up" | 3:52 |
| 6. | "I Did It for Everyone" | 4:25 |
| 7. | "Won't Go Away" | 3:48 |
| 8. | "Loneliness" | 3:25 |
| 9. | "Conor" | 3:41 |
| 10. | "This Time" | 3:20 |
| 11. | "Don't Make Me Sad" | 5:00 |
| 12. | "The Greatest Show on Earth" (At 5:23 the song segues into the hidden track "We Can Dance") | 8:44 |
| Total length: | | 54:38 |

iTunes Store bonus tracks
| No. | Title | Length |
|---|---|---|
| 13. | "You've Got Big Eyes" | 3:35 |
| 14. | "I Thought It Was Over" (acoustic version; live video) | 3:27 |

2-disc special edition bonus disc: Old Friends
| No. | Title | Length |
|---|---|---|
| 1. | "Sewn" (Dan's Original Version) | 4:51 |
| 2. | "Video Killed the Radio Star" (live from the Hospital) | 3:45 |
| 3. | "Fill My Little World" (acoustic version) | 3:06 |
| 4. | "All You Need to Do" | 4:07 |
| 5. | "Never Be Lonely" (acoustic version) | 3:36 |
| 6. | "Don't Give Up" | 4:04 |
| 7. | "When I Return" | 4:08 |
| 8. | "Love It When You Call" (chorale version) | 3:38 |
| Total length: | | 31:15 |

== Charts ==
=== Weekly charts ===
| Chart (2008) | Peak position |
|---|---|
| Irish Albums (IRMA) | 29 |
| Scottish Albums (Official Charts) | 4 |
| UK Albums (Official Charts) | 1 |

=== Year-end charts ===
| Chart (2008) | Position |
|---|---|
| UK Albums (OCC) | 75 |

== Certifications ==
| Region | Certification | Certified units/sales |
|---|---|---|
| United Kingdom (BPI) | Gold | 100,000^{^} |
^{^} Shipments figures based on certification alone.
