= The Feeling =

English rock/pop band

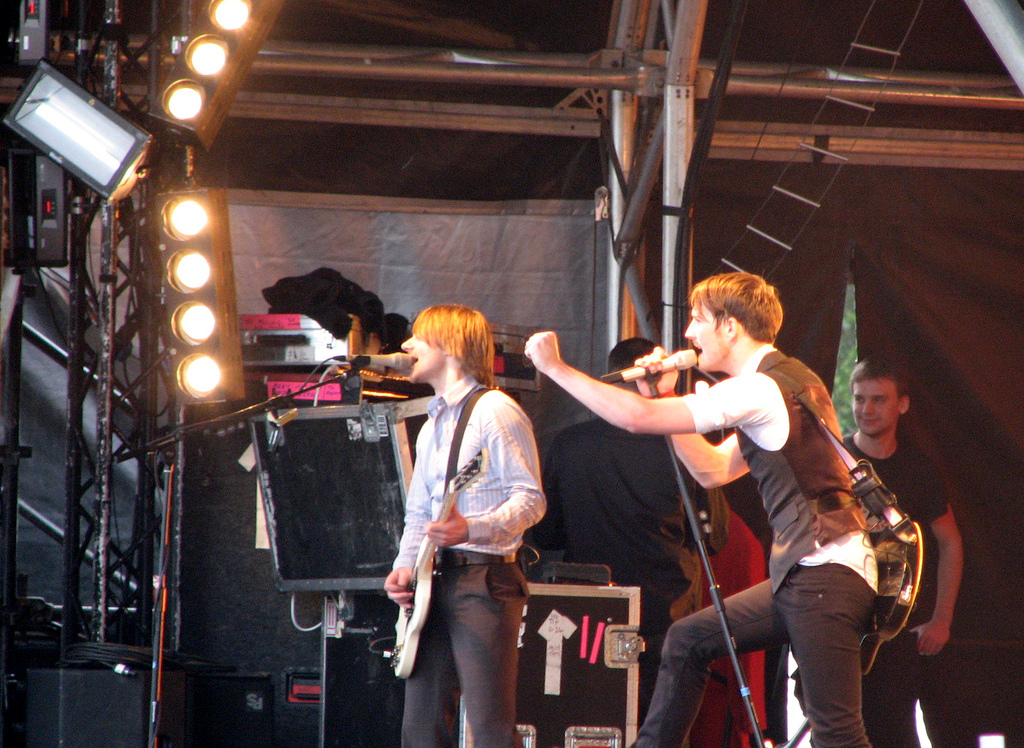
- Performing in London, 2007

Background information
- Origin: Horsham, Sussex, England
- Genres: Soft rock; power pop; yacht rock
- Years active: 1995–present
- Label: MCA Music, Inc./Island
- Members: Dan Gillespie Sells; Richard Jones; Kevin Jeremiah; Ciaran Jeremiah; Paul Stewart
- Website: www.thefeeling.com

The Feeling are an English rock/pop band from Horsham, Sussex.

Following a limited release of their first single "Fill My Little World" in late 2005, the band entered the UK Singles Chart at #7 with their first full release "Sewn" in February 2006. The single was one of the year's biggest radio hits, after being played first in the UK on the Dermot O'Leary Show on Radio 2, along with their first live radio session.

Their debut album Twelve Stops and Home was released in the UK on 5 June 2006 and on 27 February 2007 in the US. Their second album, Join with Us, which reached number one on the UK Albums Chart, was released on 18 February 2008. Their third album, Together We Were Made, was released on 20 June 2011, followed by the release of their greatest hits album Singles (2006–2011) on 5 December. Their fourth album Boy Cried Wolf was released in 2013. In March 2016 the band released their self-titled 5th studio album. Their sixth studio album, Loss. Hope. Love., was released in May 2022. Their name comes from a neon sign seen by bassist Richard on a bar (Le Feeling) in Paris.

== History ==
=== 1995–2005: Formation and early years ===
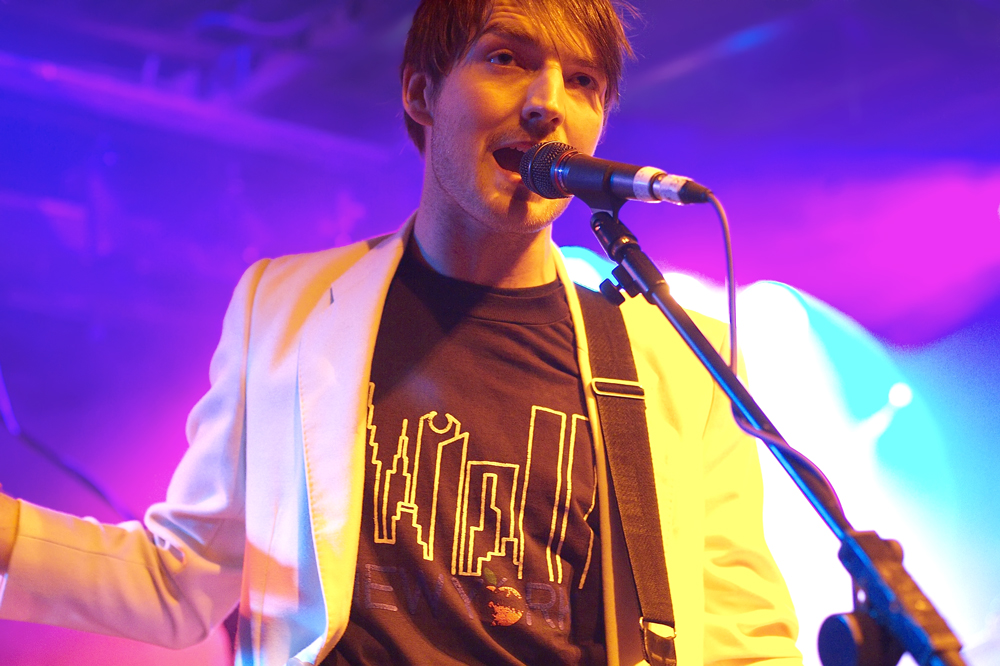
Dan Gillespie Sells with The Feeling at the Marquee Club, Leicester Square, London, February 2005

The majority of the band members are from Horsham, Sussex, with the exception of lead vocalist Dan Gillespie Sells, who is from London, and bassist Richard Jones, who is from Forest Row, in Sussex. The Jeremiahs and Stewart met while attending St Wilfrid's Catholic School, Crawley, Sussex. Sells and Jones met as music students at the BRIT School in Croydon in 1995.

The band members worked as session musicians for several years before coming together as a group. The Feeling has its roots in a covers band called Superfly, which Paul Stewart and Ciaran and Kevin Jeremiah played in, and which also acted as the house band on The Richard Blackwood Show. They spent a lot of time performing as resident band at the La Tania ski resort in the Alps before their début doing covers (such as "Video Killed the Radio Star" by The Buggles and "Raining Blood" by Slayer), and after the line-up of The Feeling had been completed, they continued to use the name Superfly, as it was easier to get bookings.

It was later revealed in a podcast for The Times that the band had "blagged" their way into the La Tania residency, saying they could perform fifty songs when in fact they only knew six. The last gigs in the Alps were in the winter of 2004. After these gigs they would sell demo CDs, which included the tracks "Funny Cigarette", "Sun Is Shining", "Still You Want More", "Never Be Lonely" and "Join with Us". Most of these tracks have since been released as singles, album tracks, or B-sides.

=== 2006–2007: Twelve Stops and Home ===
According to Island Records A&R Louis Bloom, a particularly underwhelming industry showcase gig prompted various record company representatives in attendance to pass on the band. However, following the performance their manager, Adrian Jolly, phoned up Bloom and persuaded him to ignore the disastrous gig and instead listen to the band's demos. The demos - which featured all the eventual singles from the debut album - convinced the Island A&R to sign the band, who singled out the songwriting in particular as being "fantastic".

On 5 June 2006, The Feeling released their debut album, Twelve Stops and Home, which reached #2 in the UK Albums Chart. To celebrate the release, the band's record company, Island Records, took 120 British music journalists on the Eurostar to Paris for the day, where the band performed live in a restaurant. This was in recognition of the fact the band took their name from a Parisian bar.

The first single, "Sewn" reached #7 on the UK charts in March 2006, followed by the top ten hit "Fill My Little World" in May 2006. The release spent four consecutive weeks at #16 and outsold the band's debut single. "Never Be Lonely" was released in August 2006 and became their third top ten hit, peaking at #9, where it stayed for two weeks.

In 2006, The Feeling toured the United States, opening for The Fray and strengthening their following across the Atlantic. They sold an EP named Four Stops and Home along the way. It consisted of two album tracks "Sewn" and "Helicopter" and two future B-sides "When I Return" and "All You Need To Do". In November 2006, just days after returning from the US, the band headed off on their first major UK and Ireland tour, playing at Birmingham, London, Cambridge, Brighton, Oxford, Southampton, Cardiff, Bristol, Manchester, Nottingham, Liverpool, Newcastle, Hull, Glasgow, Leeds, Belfast and Dublin.

"Fill My Little World" was used in the farewell montage on the last The Vicar of Dibley on New Year's Day 2007 and an edited version of "Love It When You Call" appeared in the 2007 film Good Luck Chuck. At the end of March 2007, the band went Stateside once again, taking part in VH1's first ever "You Oughta Know" tour alongside Mat Kearney and Rocco DeLuca and The Burden. The tour lasted approximately two months, and finished with The Feeling playing the 2007 Coachella festival in Indio, California.

The band also headlined a mini-tour of the UK's forests around June 2007. They played at large clearings and forest activity sites, near their own homes, leading Gillespie-Sells to quip about playing to elves.

In an e-mail newsletter released on 11 January 2007, it was announced that The Feeling was the most played band on UK radio in 2006. Their four singles received a total of 97,436 plays, which meant that, on average, a song by The Feeling was played 267 times every day, or once every 5 minutes.

=== 2007–2008: Join with Us ===
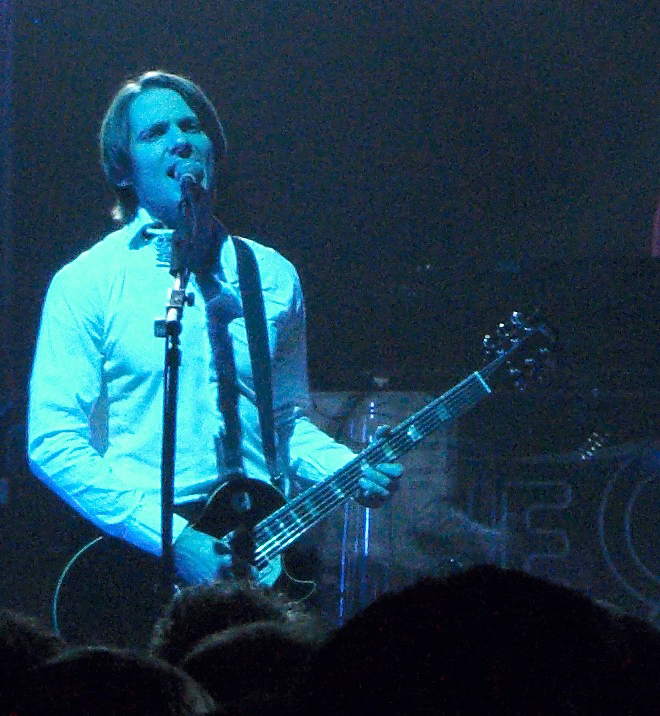
Kevin Jeremiah in 2008

Their second album, entitled Join with Us was released on 18 February 2008, with the first single "I Thought It Was Over" entering the UK charts at #12 on 10 February 2008 on the strength of downloads alone. The album debuted at number 1 on the UK Albums Chart.

The majority of the album was recorded at Bradley House, a stately home in Maiden Bradley near Warminster, Wiltshire (home of the Duke of Somerset), whilst most mixing was carried out in Los Angeles, California.

The band performed at the 2008 V Festivals in Chelmsford and Staffordshire in August. On 7 March 2008, they embarked on a mini-tour of the UK, starting in Birmingham Academy and ending at London. On 1 April 2008, it was confirmed that they would support Bon Jovi at four of their seven dates on the UK leg of their Lost Highway Tour.

On 27 June 2008, the band played the pyramid stage at the Glastonbury Festival, which was their first appearance at the legendary festival. During the performance, they covered The Buggles' "Video Killed the Radio Star" and A-ha's "Take On Me". In November 2008, the band embarked on one of their biggest UK and Irish tours to date, performing at 21 venues.

=== 2009–2011: Together We Were Made and greatest hits ===
Their third studio album was released on 20 June 2011. The band played a short two-night series of intimate concerts at The Water Rats on 4 and 5 May 2010 to preview new tracks for the album.

Singer and wife of bassist Richard Jones Sophie Ellis-Bextor performed a duet with the band on their third album on the song "Leave Me Out of It".

During two small concerts at The Water Rats venue in London 4 and 5 May 2010, The Feeling showcased 10 new songs: "Set My World on Fire", "Leave Me Out of It", "Build a Home" (originally "Penny's Dropped"), "Love & Care", "Another Soldier", "Say No", "Seven Years", "Searched Every Corner", "Bullshit Rules the World" and "Undeniable" (the last track on their third album).

"Set My World on Fire" was confirmed as the new single on 6 February 2011 to be released on iTunes in March, however the date was pushed back in order to make way for a limited-edition CD release of the single. The song was released on 1 May. They performed "Set My World on Fire" on ITV1's Paul O'Grady Live on 6 May 2011. On 2 June 2011, The Feeling played a concert for Radio 2 at The Mermaid Theatre in Blackfriars, London. During this set they played numerous songs from the new album including "Set My World on Fire", "Say No", "Leave Me Out of It", "Another Soldier" and "A Hundred Sinners".

Due to the inclusion of a re-recorded version of the band's 2007 single "Rosé" on a worldwide TV commercial for Burberry Body perfume, the band announced that their first greatest hits album Singles (2006–2011) would be released on 5 December 2011, featuring all of the band's singles to date. In November 2011, in an interview on the band's website, drummer Paul Stewart revealed that they had begun work on their fourth studio album after a string of successful live dates with a stand in instrumentalist known as cosmic vibes.

=== 2012–2016: Boy Cried Wolf, The Feeling + hiatus ===
In 2012, the band performed as the headline act at Gonville & Caius' May Ball, playing a range of their greatest hits and some covers.

They were set to do a UK tour in April 2013 promoting their fourth studio album Boy Cried Wolf, but had to delay it to October 2013 to synchronise with the release of the album. As an apology for rescheduling the tour, the band did a small show at The Doghouse (Dan's house) at which they played songs from the fourth album, including "Rescue" and "Boy Cried Wolf". This was also a live webcast and can be viewed at any time at www.thefeeling.com. The band topped the bill at the Rochdale Feel Good Festival, 31 August 2013, where they played tracks off the new album.

On 28 September 2015 the band released a lyric video for the single "Wicked Heart". Their fifth studio album The Feeling released on 4 March 2016.

The band played a final UK tour of sellout gigs towards the end of 2016, announcing that the last show of the tour would mark a hiatus until at least 2018.

=== 2017–2019: end of hiatus and Everybody's Talking About Jamie ===
The hiatus announced in 2016 only lasted until 2017 after a surprise return on Chris Evans' The Radio 2 Breakfast Show and an announcement they would be playing CarFest 2018.

As part of the hiatus, Dan Gillespie Sells collaborated with writer and lyricist Tom MacRae to create the music for the musical Everybody's Talking About Jamie, which premiered in Sheffield in February 2017 and moved to the West End in November 2017. The musical was very successful, and in 2018 Gillespie Sells received a nomination for Outstanding Achievement in Music at the 2018 Laurence Olivier Awards. A film adaptation was announced in May 2018 and released in September 2021, with Gillespie Sells collaborating again with MacRae on the soundtrack.

=== 2020–present: Loss. Love. Hope. and San Vito ===
In an interview with Vicki Michelle on Phoenix FM in February 2019, Gillespie Sells stated that the band were writing a new album, due for release in 2020. And on 2 December 2020, the band posted a picture on social media of the progress of fourteen songs off their sixth studio album. With the COVID-19 lockdown in London, they spent more time to record and self-produce the album entitled Loss. Hope. Love with a release date set for early May 2022. In September 2021, as a taster for the new album, they released their version of "This Was Me", which Dan Gillespie Sells wrote for the film adaptation of the West End musical Everybody's Talking About Jamie. The Feeling also recorded the title track for the soundtrack. They also announced a major UK tour for October 2022.

On 31 January 2023 the band announced they started working on their upcoming 7th album. The album's title would be later revealed as "San Vito", released on 12 April 2024, on digital download, CD and vinyl, in association with a UK/Europe tour throughout 2024.

== Musical style and influences ==
The Feeling have cited Elton John, Supertramp, the Beatles, Fleetwood Mac, Metallica, and 10cc as influences. The group's guitar-and piano-driven pop/rock sound has been described as power pop, soft rock, melodic rock, pop rock and progressive pop.

== Members ==
- Dan Gillespie Sells – lead vocals, guitars
- Richard Jones – bass guitar, vocals
- Kevin Jeremiah – guitars, vocals
- Ciaran Jeremiah – keyboards, vocals
- Paul Stewart – drums

== Discography ==
- Twelve Stops and Home (2006)
- Join with Us (2008)
- Together We Were Made (2011)
- Boy Cried Wolf (2013)
- The Feeling (2016)
- Loss. Hope. Love. (2022)
- San Vito (2024)

== Awards and nominations ==
2006

- Q Awards – Best Track – "Never Be Lonely" (Nominated)

2007

- BRIT Awards – British Single of the Year – "Fill My Little World" (Nominated)
- Ivor Novello Awards – Songwriters of the Year (Won)
- NME Awards – Best Band (Nominated)

2008

- Elle Style Awards – Band of the Year (Won)
