= Dan Gillespie Sells =

English musician (born 1978)

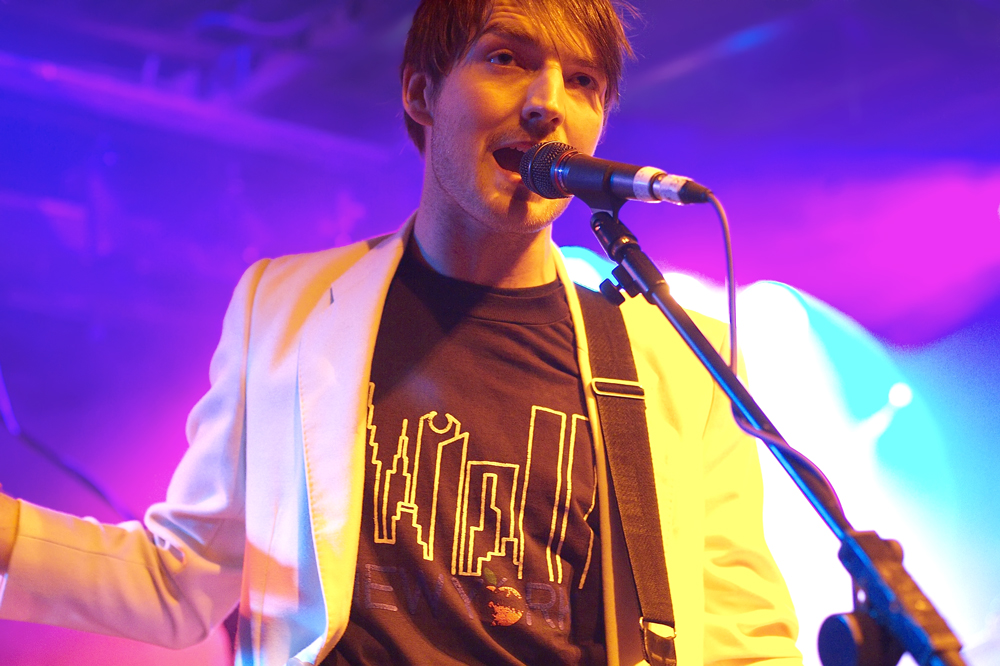
- Sells with the Feeling in 2005

Background information
- Born: Daniel Giles Gillespie Sells; 20 September 1978 (age 48)
- Origin: London, England
- Genres: Rock, pop, musical theatre
- Occupations: Singer, musician, songwriter
- Instruments: Vocals, guitar
- Years active: 1995–present
- Member of: The Feeling
- Formerly of: Speedway

Daniel Giles Gillespie Sells (/ɡɪˈlɛspi/ ghih-LES-pee; born 20 September 1978) is an English musician, best known as the lead vocalist and frontman for the rock group the Feeling.

== Biography ==
Sells and his brother James were co-parented, being brought up dividing their time between their father's house and their mother's house after their parents split when he was three years old, following his mother's coming out. His mother is disability rights and LGBT rights campaigner Katherine Gillespie Sells, and his father is Keith Sells. He was also parented by his mother's former partner Dilis, whom he refers to as his other mother. Sells attended Osidge Primary School and Ashmole School in London along with fellow students Amy Winehouse and Rachel Stevens (S Club 7).

In early 2007, Sells was in an advertising campaign for the Autograph range at Marks and Spencer. He says he took part partly because his grandmother liked M&S, and would like to see him advertising it.

In addition to his work with the Feeling, he co-wrote songs for Sophie Ellis-Bextor's third solo album, Trip the Light Fantastic. The two songs he co-wrote appear on the track-listing as, "Only One" and "Love Is Here". Both tracks also feature his vocals, and "Love Is Here" includes his bandmate Richard Jones, Sophie Ellis-Bextor's husband, on bass guitar. Ellis-Bextor features on the Feeling's album, Together We Were Made, on the song "Leave Me Out of It".

Sells co-wrote and co-performed (both with Ian Masterson) the theme tune to the 2008 BBC comedy drama series Beautiful People, an adaptation of the memoirs of Simon Doonan. In addition, Sells also contributed another original track, entitled "Beautiful People", as well as a 2006 cover version of Daryl Hall & John Oates's "She's Gone" with his Feeling bandmates. All three tracks appeared on the Beautiful People soundtrack album released in October 2008.

In 2014, he began to collaborate with choreographer Javier de Frutos on a ballet piece entitled '3 With D' which featured the Royal Ballet's principal dancer Edward Watson and premiered at London Coliseum.

In 2017, Sells composed the music for the musical Everybody's Talking About Jamie. The show opened at the Crucible Theatre, Sheffield in February 2017 and transferred to the West End at the Apollo Theatre in November. The soundtrack was released as an album in the same year, and features vocals by Sophie Ellis-Bextor, Betty Boo, and Josie Walker.

In November 2023 Sells was a contestant on BBC's Celebrity Mastermind, answering questions on Bernie Taupin.

Sells wrote original music for Brokeback Mountain, a "play-with-music" adaptation of Annie Proulx's short story of the same name. The production opened on London's West End in 2023 directed by Jonathan Butterell, with whom Sells also collaborated on Everybody's Talking About Jamie.

== Influences ==
Sells has stated that Karen Carpenter was "one of the greatest vocal technicians ever". He also cites Freddie Mercury and Neil Young as influences.

== Personal life ==
Sells is gay, and won two Stonewall Awards for Entertainer of the Year in 2007 and Entertainer of the Decade in 2015. Sells featured on the cover of an issue of Attitude magazine in 2008, being the first cover shoot Sells had done and was later on the front cover again on the September 2008 issue, alongside Alan Carr, Markus Feehily of Westlife and Sir Ian McKellen. In 2012, Sells wrote about his coming-out experience.

In an interview in 2014, Sells criticised closeted gay celebrities, saying "I think sharing who you are and being yourself is so valuable. It's so important. I think if you are not part of the solution, you are part of the problem."
