= Richard Jones (The Feeling) =

British music producer, songwriter and bass guitar player (born 1979)

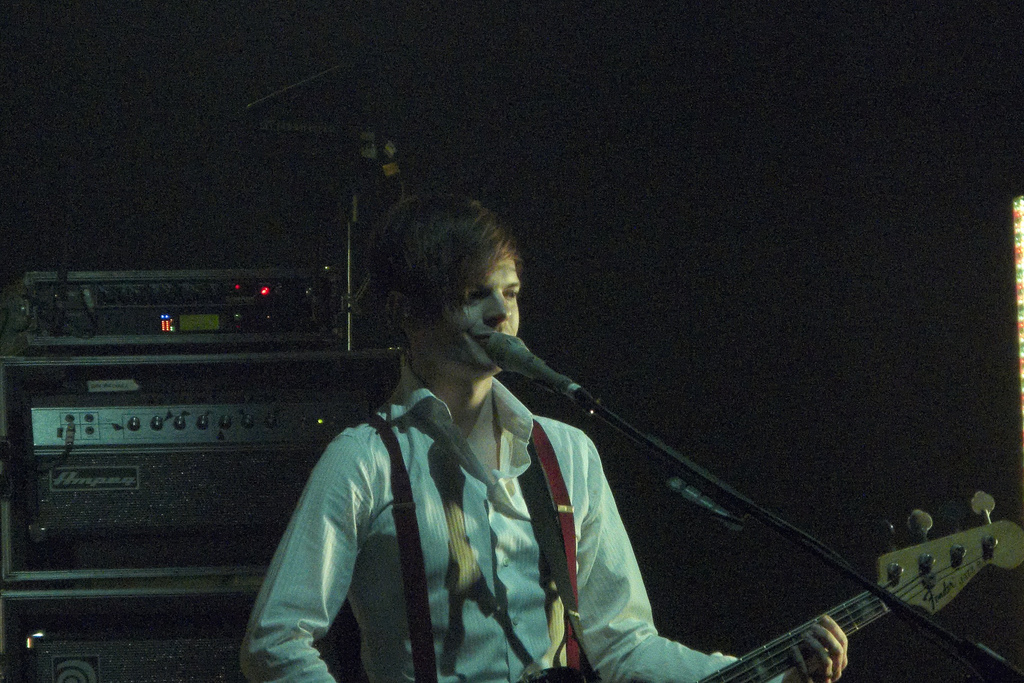
- Jones in 2008

Background information
- Born: 6 April 1979 (age 47)
- Origin: Forest Row, East Sussex, England
- Genres: Rock, pop, soft rock, power pop
- Occupation: Musician
- Instrument: Bass guitar
- Years active: 1995–present
- Member of: The Feeling, The CarFest Supergroup, Loup GarouX
- Spouse: Sophie Ellis-Bextor (m. 2005)

Richard Jones (born 6 April 1979) is a British music producer, songwriter, bass guitar player and founding member of rock band the Feeling.

== Career ==
Jones attended the BRIT School in Croydon, England. He cites Paul McCartney and John Deacon among his influences. He also admires Jaco Pastorius and James Jamerson for their "technicality".

Prior to the Feeling signing to Island Records in 2005, Jones worked primarily as a session bass guitarist and toured as a member of Sophie Ellis-Bextor's band in 2001–2003 to promote her 2001 album Read My Lips. An April 2002 concert from Shepherd's Bush Empire featuring Jones was released on DVD as Watch My Lips. He also appears frequently on a bonus feature on the DVD, a video diary about life on the road during the tour. Since then Jones has played bass on all of Ellis-Bextor's studio albums and on many tours in between work with the Feeling.

As a member of the Feeling, Jones won Songwriter of the Year in 2007 at the Ivor Novello Awards.

In 2010, Jones co-founded and curated the Little World music festival held in 2010/11 in Meribel, France.

He performed in the closing ceremony of the 2012 Olympic Games on 12 August 2012 with Ed Sheeran, Nick Mason and Mike Rutherford.

During 2016–17, Jones joined Bryan Adams' band on bass guitar duties during the Get Up tour as cover for long term bassist Norm Fischer.

In 2018, Ed Harcourt and Jones co-organised a fundraising concert to help raise funds to save the All Star Boxing gym in Queen's Park from closure.

In 2019, Jones played bass guitar as part of the band for the 'A Not So Silent Night' Christmas concerts in Dublin and London with Rufus Wainwright, Martha Wainwright, Chrissie Hynde, Guy Garvey and Neil Tennant which were held to benefit the Kate McGarrigle fund.

In 2019, Jones announced the formation of new group Loup Garoux with long-term collaborator and friend Ed Harcourt and drummer of Senseless Things and Gorillaz, Cass Browne. The band played their first live dates supporting Supergrass in March 2020.

Jones put together the CarFest Supergroup, on behalf of Virgin radio DJ Chris Evans, who released a live double album for the anniversary of Evans' music and motoring festival with the profits going to a number of charities including the Teenage Cancer Trust and the Starlight Children's Foundation. Vocalists/musicians on the album include Sophie Ellis-Bextor, Roger Daltrey, KT Tunstall, Gary Kemp and Ricky Wilson.

In 2020, during the COVID-19 pandemic, Jones and his wife Sophie Ellis-Bextor broadcast live weekly "Kitchen Disco" concerts featuring themselves and their family, streamed live from their kitchen on Instagram. According to Ellis-Bextor, Jones came up with the concept and also films, edits and deals with the technical aspects of the broadcasts as well as appearing wearing animal masks.

== Personal life ==
Jones married British pop star Sophie Ellis-Bextor on 25 June 2005 in Italy. Jones has said "something kind of smacked us in the face. The chemistry was incredible – it was like nothing I've ever experienced". Their first baby was born two months premature, and only eight months after they started going out together.

Jones mentioned in a 2011 Flaps podcast that he was learning to fly. He also talked about obtaining his private pilot's licence and his passion for flying in an interview for Pilot magazine in 2013. Pink Floyd drummer Nick Mason and Jones discussed their friendship and flying together in a profile piece for The Independent newspaper in 2013.

As of 2019, Jones and Ellis-Bextor live in West London with their five children.

Jones has a history of not eating meat, which he continued to do when he first began dating Ellis-Bextor. During her June 2023 appearance on Grilled!, a podcast by The Staff Canteen, Ellis-Bextor said she had managed to convert Jones to eating meat, despite his previous objections.
