= Songs from the Kitchen Disco =

Greatest hits album by Sophie Ellis-Bextor
- Released: 13 November 2020
- Recorded: 2000–2020
- Studio: Various
- Genre: Disco; pop
- Length: 75:55
- Label: EBGB's; Cooking Vinyl

Sophie Ellis-Bextor chronology
The Song Diaries (2019)	Songs from the Kitchen Disco (2020)	Kitchen Disco – Live at the London Palladium (2022)

Singles from Songs from the Kitchen Disco
- 1. "Crying at the Discotheque" Released: 18 September 2020

Songs from the Kitchen Disco is the first greatest hits album by English singer-songwriter Sophie Ellis-Bextor, released on 13 November 2020 by EGBG's, although it was previously announced for 23 October. It features singles from all her studio albums: Read My Lips (2001), Shoot from the Hip (2003), Trip the Light Fantastic (2007), Make a Scene (2011), Wanderlust (2014) and Familia (2016), as well as a number of cover versions of songs by other artists. Songs from the Kitchen Disco serves as the follow-up to her previous release, the 2019 orchestral compilation album The Song Diaries.

== Background ==
In 2019 Ellis-Bextor released The Song Diaries, her first compilation album. It consists primarily of orchestral versions of 15 of her solo singles, and a new track, a cover of Carol Williams's "Love Is You". The album was produced by Ed Harcourt (who also produced her two last studio albums), with additional production by Richard "Biff" Stannard and Ash Howes. During that same year she also embarked on The Song Diaries Tour within the UK with a full orchestra and her band; the tour consisted on 14 dates, grouped in two legs, one in late spring and the other one in autumn.

During the COVID-19 pandemic lockdown, Ellis-Bextor, her husband, The Feeling bassist Richard Jones and their kids hosted a number of live shows via Instagram called Kitchen Disco Live every Friday night for 10 weeks. During these shows, she performed some of her songs (including non-single tracks), and a bunch of covers.

== Kitchen Disco shows ==
Every Friday, for 10 weeks (from 27 March to 29 May), Ellis-Bextor performed a series of live shows via Instagram on her own house as a way of virtual escapism of the hard time she and her family were facing during the COVID-19 pandemic lockdown in the UK. During these shows (named Kitchen Discos) she sang live, while her sons joined her, on the chaotic yet enjoyable performances. Additional shows were hosted on 17 July (celebrating the end of the term) and on 30 October (for Halloween). Ellis-Bextor also did a Christmas special and a further series of shows for the early 2021 lockdown.

The live transmissions lasted 30 minutes, and regular songs included her top-three singles "Take Me Home", "Groovejet (If This Ain't Love)" and "Murder on the Dancefloor". She also performed several of her singles and album tracks and a wide variety of covers. From the Kitchen Disco #6 onwards she did an encore session, called "The After Party", just after the end of the transmissions. During these after parties she sang songs less danceable and more relatable to musicals, like "My Favourite Things" (from The Sound of Music) and "There Are Worse Things I Could Do" (from Grease).

Ellis-Bextor began presenting a weekly programme under the same name (Sophie Ellis-Bextor's Kitchen Disco) on BBC Radio 2 in May 2020.

Kitchen Disco live shows

Original running

- Kitchen Disco 1 (27 March)
1. Take Me Home
2. Get Over You
3. Medley: Lady (Hear Me Tonight) / Groovejet (If This Ain't Love) / Sing It Back
4. Yes Sir, I Can Boogie
5. Murder on the Dancefloor
- Kitchen Disco 2 (3 April)
1. Wild Forever
2. Take Me Home
3. Groovejet (If This Ain't Love)
4. Kids in America
5. Heartbreak (Make Me a Dancer)
6. Murder on the Dancefloor
- Kitchen Disco 3 – Sophie's Birthday (10 April)
1. Music Gets the Best of Me
2. Take Me Home
3. Electricity Band
4. Young Blood
5. Crying at the Discoteque
6. Groovejet (If This Ain't Love)
7. Murder on the Dancefloor
- Kitchen Disco 4 (17 April)
1. Take Me Home
2. If You Go
3. Groovejet (If This Ain't Love)
4. True Faith
5. Bittersweet
6. Murder on the Dancefloor
- Kitchen Disco 5 (24 April)
1. Revolution
2. Take Me Home
3. Me and My Imagination
4. I Feel It Coming
5. Groovejet (If This Ain't Love)
6. Murder on the Dancefloor
- Kitchen Disco 6 (1 May)
1. China Heart
2. Take Me Home
3. Mixed Up World
4. Groovejet (If This Ain't Love)
5. Like a Prayer
6. Murder on the Dancefloor
7. After party: My Favorite Things
- Kitchen Disco 7 (8 May)
1. Magic
2. Take Me Home
3. Starlight
4. Don't Leave Me This Way
5. Groovejet (If This Ain't Love)
6. Murder on the Dancefloor
7. After party: There Are Worse Things I Could Do
8. After party: We'll Meet Again
- Kitchen Disco 8 (15 May)
1. If I Can't Dance
2. Take Me Home
3. Catch You
4. Over and Over
5. Groovejet (If This Ain't Love)
6. Murder on the Dancefloor
7. After party: Gett Off
- Kitchen Disco 9 (22 May)
1. Under Your Touch
2. Off & On
3. Take Me Home
4. Not Giving Up on Love
5. Do You Remember the First Time?
6. Groovejet (If This Ain't Love)
7. Murder on the Dancefloor
8. After party: Spoonful of Sugar
- Kitchen Disco 10 (29 May)
1. Come with Us
2. Take Me Home
3. Today the Sun's on Us
4. Walking on Broken Glass
5. Get Over You
6. Medley: Lady (Hear Me Tonight) / Groovejet (If This Ain't Love) / Sing It Back
7. Murder on the Dancefloor
8. After party: Our House

Specials

- Kitchen Disco – End of term disco special (17 July)
1. Dial My Number
2. Take Me Home
3. School's Out
4. Groovejet (If This Ain't Love)
5. Crying at the Discotheque
6. Heartbreak (Make Me a Dancer)
7. Murder on the Dancefloor
8. After party: You Give a Little Love
- Kitchen Disco – Halloween special (30 October)
1. Ghostbusters
2. Crying at the Discotheque
3. She Wolf
4. Love Is a Camera
5. Groovejet (If This Ain't Love)
6. Monster Mash
7. Murder on the Dancefloor
8. After party: Wuthering Heights

== Critical reception ==
Professional ratings
Review scores
Source	Rating
Clash	7/10
Gigwise	8/10
The Independent	3/5 stars
The Irish Times	4/5 stars
MusicOMH	4/4 stars
NEWsic	7.5/10
Retro Pop	3/4 stars
Vinyl Chapters	4.5/5 stars

Songs from the Kitchen Disco received positive reviews from music critics and fans alike, many of whom associated the album with the Instagram Live shows held by Ellis-Bextor during the pandemic lockdown, emphasising her 20 years of solo career and the fine selection of singles and covers included.

Lauren Murphy from The Irish Times wrote "if the mark of a great song is that it works in any setting – be it a kitchen surrounded by small children hanging off your leg or on the dance floor of an actual club in the wee hours – this collection is evidence that the perennially-underestimated Ellis-Bextor has amassed more than a few of them over the last two decades" Nick Smith from musicOMH called the collection "magnificent".

Additionally, Clash's Robin Murray states: "Sophie Ellis-Bextor has shone fresh light on her inimitable pop approach, recasting these songs in her own manner. Songs from the Kitchen Disco is the ideal tonic for those winter blues."

== Track listing ==
Songs from the Kitchen Disco track listing
No.	Title	Writer(s)	Producer(s)	Length
1.	"Groovejet (If This Ain't Love)" (2020 re-recording of the 2000 single)	Sophie Ellis-Bextor; Cristiano Spiller; Rob Davis; Vincent Montana Jr.; Ronald Walker	Freemasons; Richard Jones	3:46
2.	"Take Me Home (A Girl Like Me)" (from Read My Lips, 2001)	Ellis-Bextor; Bob Esty; Michele Aller	Damian LeGassick; Jeremy Wheatley	4:06
3.	"Murder on the Dancefloor" (from Read My Lips)	Ellis-Bextor; Gregg Alexander	Matt Rowe; Alexander	3:50
4.	"Get Over You" (from the 2002 Read My Lips reissue)	Ellis-Bextor; Rob Davis; Henrik Korpi; Mathias Johansson; Nina Woodford	Korpi & Blackcell	3:15
5.	"Music Gets the Best of Me" (from the Read My Lips reissue)	Ellis-Bextor; Rowe; Alexander	Rowe; Alexander; Steve Osborne; Wheatley	3:38
6.	"Mixed Up World" (from Shoot from the Hip, 2003)	Ellis-Bextor; Alexander; Rowe	Alexander; Rowe	3:43
7.	"Catch You" (from Trip the Light Fantastic, 2007)	Cathy Dennis; Greg Kurstin; Rhys Barker	Kurstin	3:19
8.	"Me and My Imagination" (from Trip the Light Fantastic)	Ellis-Bextor; Hannah Robinson; Matthew Prime	Prime; Jeremy Wheatley; Brio Taliaferro	3:25
9.	"Today the Sun's on Us" (from Trip the Light Fantastic)	Ellis-Bextor; Steve Robson; Nina Woodford	Wheatley; Taliaferro	4:16
10.	"Bittersweet" (from Make a Scene, 2011)	Ellis-Bextor; Hannah Robinson; Russell Small; Richard Stannard; James Wiltshire	Freemasons; Stannard	3:28
11.	"Starlight" (from Make a Scene)	Ellis-Bextor; Richard X; Robinson	Richard X	4:19
12.	"Not Giving Up on Love" (from Make a Scene)	Ellis-Bextor; Armin van Buuren; Benno de Goeij; Olivia Nervo; Miriam Nervo	van Buuren; Goeij	2:53
13.	"Heartbreak (Make Me a Dancer)" (from Make a Scene)	Ellis-Bextor; Wiltshire; Small; Stannard	Freemasons; Stannard	3:26
14.	"Young Blood" (from Wanderlust, 2014)	Ellis-Bextor; Ed Harcourt	Harcourt	4:28
15.	"True Faith" (BBC session; originally by New Order)	Gillian Gilbert; Stephen Hague; Peter Hook; Stephen Morris; Bernard Sumner	Harcourt; Jones	5:02
16.	"Do You Remember the First Time?" (live; originally by Pulp)	Pulp		4:13
17.	"Come with Us" (from Familia, 2016)	Ellis-Bextor; Harcourt	Harcourt	3:56
18.	"Wild Forever" (from Familia)	Ellis-Bextor; Harcourt	Harcourt	4:24
19.	"Crying at the Discotheque" (originally by Alcazar)	Alexander Bard; Bernard Edwards; Michael Goulos; Anders Hansson; Nile Rodgers; Anders Wollbeck	The Alias	3:50
20.	"My Favorite Things" (originally from The Sound of Music)	Rodgers and Hammerstein	David Arnold; Jones	2:38
Total length:				75:55

== Charts ==
Chart performance for Songs from the Kitchen Disco
Chart (2020)	Peak position
Australian Albums (ARIA)	51
Irish Albums (IRMA)	62
Irish Independent Albums (IRMA)	6
Scottish Albums (OCC)	9
UK Albums (OCC)	8
UK Independent Albums (OCC)	1

== Release history ==
Release dates and formats for Songs from the Kitchen Disco
Region	Date	Format	Label	Ref.
Various	13 November 2020	Digital download; streaming	EGBG's; Cooking Vinyl	
Various	13 November 2020	CD; double vinyl (pink); Double vinyl (blue); Cassette (pink); Cassette (lilac)	EGBG's; Cooking Vinyl	
