= Kitchen Disco – Live at the London Palladium =

Live album by Sophie Ellis-Bextor
- Released: 25 November 2022
- Recorded: 30 March 2022
- Label: EBGB's; Cooking Vinyl

Sophie Ellis-Bextor chronology
Songs from the Kitchen Disco (2020)	Kitchen Disco – Live at the London Palladium (2022)	Hana (2023)

Kitchen Disco – Live at the London Palladium is a live album by English singer Sophie Ellis-Bextor, released on 25 November 2022 by EBGB's and Cooking Vinyl. The album was recorded at London Palladium on 30 March 2022.

The album was announced in September 2022 with Ellis-Bextor saying: "Doing the Kitchen Disco tour was the end of a promise I made during our lockdown discos... to bring the party to a live audience. I'm so happy we have this recording from the London Palladium so I can relive it and share it with you!"

== Reception ==
An Amazon editorial review said, "On the back of her incredible Kitchen Disco Instagram parties during lockdown and the accompanying Greatest Hits album Songs from the Kitchen Disco, Sophie took her incredible live show back on the road in front of a live audience once again at the start of 2022. With a setlist featuring all the hits plus an incredible array of cover versions all given the Kitchen Disco treatment, fans were in for a treat.

== Track listing ==
Disc 1: Kitchen Disco – Live at the London Palladium
No.	Title	Writer(s)	Length
1.	"Take Me Home"	Sophie Ellis-Bextor; Bob Esty; Michele Aller	5:07
2.	"Disco Inferno"	Leroy Green; Ron Kersey	4:31
3.	"Wild Forever"	Ellis-Bextor; Ed Harcourt	5:50
4.	"All Night Long"	Lionel Richie	5:03
5.	"Hypnotized"	Ellis-Bextor; Peter Ferguson	3:10
6.	"Mixed Up World"	Ellis-Bextor; Alexander; Rowe	3:21
7.	"Young Blood"	Ellis-Bextor; Harcourt	5:34
8.	"There Are Worse Things I Could Do"	Jim Jacobs; Warren Casey	2:21
9.	"Love Is a Camera" (instrumental)	Ellis-Bextor; Harcourt	1:20
10.	"Dancing Queen"	Benny Andersson; Björn Ulvaeus; Stig Anderson	4:15
11.	"Medley: Get Over You / Lady (Hear Me Tonight) / Groovejet (If This Ain't Love) / Sing it Back"	Ellis-Bextor; Rob Davies; Henrik Korpi; Mathias Johansson; Nina Woodford; Yann Destagnol; Romain Tranchart; Bernard Edwards; Nile Rodgers; Cristiano Spiller; Vincent Montana Jr.; Ronald Walker; Róisín Murphy; Mark Brydon	10:47
12.	"Crying at the Discoteque"	Alexander Bard; Anders Hansson; Anders Wollbeck; Michael Goulos	6:43
13.	"Like a Prayer"	Madonna; Patrick Leonard	5:07
14.	"Heartbreak (Make Me a Dancer)"	Ellis-Bextor; James Wiltshire; Russell Small; Richard Stannard	5:15
15.	"Murder on the Dancefloor"	Ellis-Bextor; Gregg Alexander	4:55
16.	"Our House" (encore)	Chris Foreman; Cathal Smyth; Daniel Woodgate; Graham McPherson; Lee Thompson; Mark Bedford; Michael Barson	4:39
17.	"My Favourite Things" (encore)	Rodgers and Hammerstein	1:41

Disc 2: Selection of 'Spin the Wheel' from other shows on The Kitchen Disco Tour
No.	Title	Writer(s)	Length
1.	"Ain't Nobody"	David Wolinski	4:12
2.	"Ballroom Blitz"	Nicky Chinn; Mike Chapman	4:05
3.	"Yes Sir, I Can Boogie"	Frank Dostal; Rolf Soja	4:47
4.	"Music Gets the Best of Me"	Ellis-Bextor; Alexander; Matt Rowe	3:28
5.	"Bittersweet"	Ellis-Bextor; Wiltshire; Small; Stannard; Robinson	4:51
6.	"Walking On Broken Glass"	Annie Lennox	4:05
7.	"Love Is You" (Recorded)	Montana Jr.; Walker	3:27

== Charts ==
Chart performance for Kitchen Disco – Live at the London Palladium
Chart (2022)	Peak position
Scottish Albums (OCC)	39
UK Albums Sales (OCC)	28
UK Album Downloads (OCC)	77
UK Physical Albums (OCC)	27
