= Hana (Sophie Ellis-Bextor album) =

- Vinyl and digital edition cover (Note: The CD edition features a wider pink strip entirely occupied by the logo, omitting the track listing.)

Studio album by Sophie Ellis-Bextor
- Released: 2 June 2023
- Studio: The Wolf Cabin; Decoy
- Genre: Pop; pop rock; art pop
- Length: 50:04
- Label: Cooking Vinyl
- Producer: Ed Harcourt

Sophie Ellis-Bextor chronology
Kitchen Disco – Live at the London Palladium (2022)	Hana (2023)	Perimenopop (2025)

Singles from Hana
- 1. "Breaking the Circle" Released: 8 February 2023; 2. "Everything Is Sweet" Released: 24 March 2023; 3. "Lost in the Sunshine" Released: 18 April 2023

Hana is the seventh studio album by English singer-songwriter Sophie Ellis-Bextor, released through Cooking Vinyl on 2 June 2023. The album is her third and final to be produced by Ed Harcourt, alongside Wanderlust (2014) and Familia (2016). Musically, Ellis-Bextor sought to create a fantastical world for the album, inspired by a trip to Japan shortly before the COVID-19 pandemic in 2020.

Hana is an album exploring themes such as optimism, adventure and mortality. It was supported by the singles "Breaking the Circle", "Everything Is Sweet" and "Lost in the Sunshine". Reviewers praised the individuality of the album and found it a fitting addition to Ellis Bextor's discography, but held mixed opinions on the results of her continued collaboration with Harcourt.

A deluxe edition was released on 24 November 2023.

== Background and development ==
"It's optimistic and it's pop-y, but it's also quite psychedelic, proggy and synthy. It was a nice place to put other feelings. It's also my third album with Ed Harcourt. We've plotted a little course, and I feel like I've got a lot more bold with making my records and making them a little bit out there."

— Ellis-Bextor during an interview with NME.

Hana is Ellis-Bextor's first studio album since Familia (2016). The writing process for the album began in early 2020, during which Ellis-Bextor visited Japan with her son and mother. She was not originally planned to be part of the trip, but was asked to take the place of her stepfather, John, who had become too unwell to travel. Ellis-Bextor described her visit as "a really special trip, with sadness around the edges, because of what was happening with [her] stepdad". When COVID-19 lockdowns were implemented shortly after her return, she explained that Japan became a "rich, inspirational landscape to go to in our heads, which took on more significance when we suddenly couldn't go anywhere". The album title Hana (花) is the Japanese translation of "flower" or "blossom".

Following her stepfather's death in July of the same year, her grief and desire to celebrate his life also influenced the creation of Hana. During an interview with the Evening Standard's El Hunt, Ellis-Bextor explained her decision not to make a typical dance record despite the success of her "Kitchen Disco" livestream concerts during lockdown, saying that it "wasn't really where [her] heart was at". The album is her third and final to be produced in its entirety by Ed Harcourt, alongside Wanderlust (2014) and Familia (2016).

== Composition ==
Hana opens with "A Thousand Orchids", a "synth driven" track with a 1980s influence, according to The Irish News. The song, whose lyrics discuss mortality, features clipped vocals from Ellis-Bextor. Kate Solomon of i described it as "the most surprising" track on the album, noting how it is "coloured by skittering synths, austere piano chords [...] but develops into something rather shoe-gazey". The lead single "Breaking the Circle" is an "anthemic" song that features a house piano and sees Ellis-Bextor dreaming of going "into the light of the great unknown". Of the song, she said that it was "inspired by those late-night moments you have, where you question everything and feel a buzz of adrenaline about what tomorrow might bring", describing it as "urgent and dramatic and optimistic".

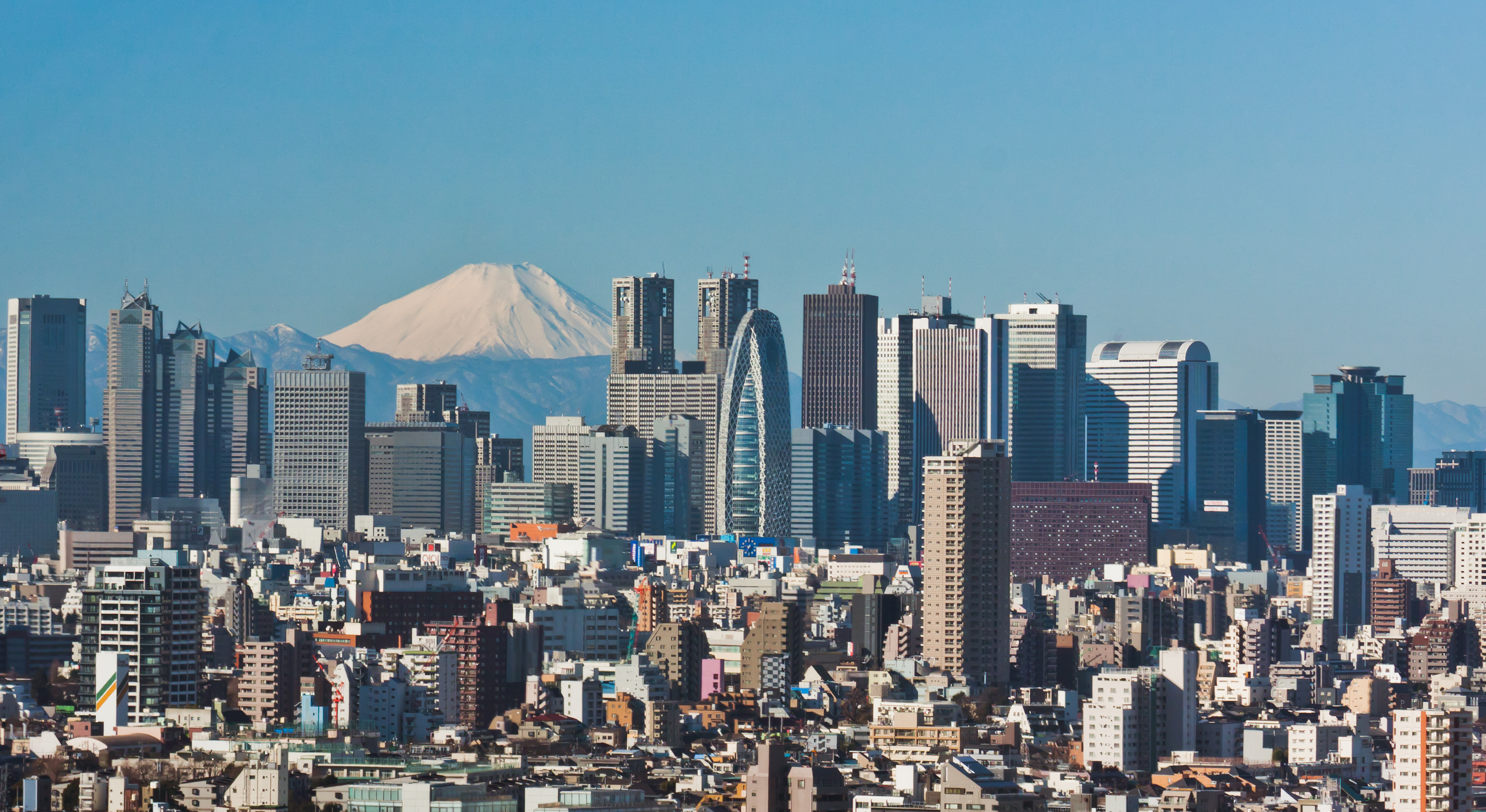
A trip that Ellis-Bextor took to Tokyo in early 2020 became central to the concept of the album.

The album's third track, "Until the Wheels Fall Off", includes lyrics taken from a letter written by her late stepfather to her mother. In an interview with The Forty-Five, Ellis-Bextor explained that the letter talks of how the pair "had travelled, laughed, and loved until the wheels fell off" and said the song is "a tribute to their marriage, because they were very happy together". "Everything Is Sweet" was described as having a "clipped synth melancholia" and was noted for its Human League influence. On "Tokyo", Ellis-Bextor recalls her last-minute trip to the city that inspired the album: "Oh I wasn't supposed to come, but it happened that the fates, they had their fun". The seventh track "Beyond the Universe" describes the effect of love: "Galaxies pass us by, all we can do is fly". The song was described as being "starry-eyed" and having a "spacey beat". Of "He's a Dreamer", The Forty-Five's Olivia-Anne Cleary noted that it "exude[s] the warmth and dream-like qualities Ellis-Bextor envisioned during the creative process" of Hana.

The ninth track, "Reflections", is a dance song with heavy beats and was described as a "neat slice of late 70s disco-soul". Within its "heartbreaking" lyrics, Ellis-Bextor self-examines whilst staring into a mirror: "I'm just looking older, not stronger". "Hearing in Colour" is a "frenzied, hallucinogenic trip" according to Sam Franzini of The Line of Best Fit, seeing Ellis-Bextor sing the lyrics: "I'm tasting tomorrow / A feverish dream". On "Broken Toy", she details feeling used within a relationship. Hana closes with "We've Been Watching You", whose production progresses into a "trippy" electronic one. Ellis-Bextor's vocals are commanding and militant on the song, which was written from the perspective of aliens observing humans on Earth and rescuing them. Franzini commended the "diversity in songwriting and sound" in relation to the track, which "leaves ample room for more experimentation in the future".

== Promotion and singles ==
"Breaking the Circle" was released as the album's lead single on 8 February 2023. Ellis-Bextor performed the song during the European leg of her Kitchen Disco Tour in 2023. The music video for "Breaking the Circle" directed by Remi Laudat was released on 1 March, which Ellis-Bextor says "moves between reality and fantasy". The album's second single, "Everything Is Sweet", was released on 23 March 2023. "Lost in the Sunshine" was released as the third single on 18 April 2023. Its music video was filmed in Rome and was released on 25 May.

== Critical reception ==
Professional ratings
Review scores
Source	Rating
Albumism	5/5 stars
Clash	7/10
i	3/5 stars
The Irish News	3/5
The Line of Best Fit	7/10
Maxazine	8/10
Retropop Magazine	4/5 stars
The Telegraph	3/5 stars

Retropop Magazine felt the album is "unique to the rest of Sophie's catalogue and while there are definite pop moments, she resists chasing hits and lets the music lead the way for a sound that's both charming and enchanting." On a similar note, Sam Franzini from The Line of Best Fit thought that Hana is "an update on Ellis-Bextor's previous works, ideas, and themes – the seven-year hiatus proved to be more than enough time in order to come back to music refreshed and reinvigorated". Franzini called it "a quirky and observant addition to the Ellis-Bextor discography, mixing dark and light themes to create one of her most intriguing works to date".

Robin Murray from Clash called Hana "the closing chapter in this trilogy, and it displays both the strengths and limitations of the exercise – fun, mature pop, it's perfectly enjoyable, but at times you yearn to glimpse her edgier side." Reviewing the album for i, Kate Solomon concluded by remarking that Ellis-Bextor's collaboration with Harcourt is "clearly a fruitful pairing in terms of trying things that other producers might recoil from – but the album drags a little: it seems to meander rather than move with purpose, struggling to keep a grip on your attention as it goes."

Poppie Platt of The Telegraph noted "Breaking the Circle" as a "standout" with an "irresistible disco beat", but felt that "Some tracks (He's a Dreamer, Hearing in Colour) promise groovy drops that never fully materialise" and despite its being "fun and easygoing", one "can't help but feel flat at the conclusion". The Irish News felt that the album contains "dreamy vocals and high energy from its opening notes" but that it "may have benefited from Ellis-Bextor leaning into her signature pop style and adding more high-tempo tunes". Jeremy Williams-Chalmers of The Yorkshire Times called the album "a rather wonderful revelation" and commented that Ellis-Bextor's continued work with Harcourt "once again proves fruitful".

== Track listing ==
All tracks are written by Sophie Ellis-Bextor and Ed Harcourt and produced by Harcourt, with additional production by Richard Jones.

Hana track listing
No.	Title	Length
1.	"A Thousand Orchids"	4:36
2.	"Breaking the Circle"	4:13
3.	"Until the Wheels Fall Off"	4:07
4.	"Everything Is Sweet"	4:50
5.	"Lost in the Sunshine"	4:04
6.	"Tokyo"	3:23
7.	"Beyond the Universe"	4:13
8.	"He's a Dreamer"	5:06
9.	"Reflections"	3:22
10.	"Hearing in Colour"	4:01
11.	"Broken Toy"	3:32
12.	"We've Been Watching You"	4:37
Total length:		50:04

Hana (Deluxe) track listing
No.	Title	Length
13.	"Blossom of the Night"	3:46
14.	"Lost in the Sunshine" (Acidtone radio edit)	3:23
15.	"Lost in the Sunshine" (Acidtone remix)	4:32
16.	"Breaking the Circle" (Sudlow remix)	3:00
17.	"Breaking the Circle" (Sudlow Club mix)	6:21
18.	"Lost in the Sunshine" (Sudlow radio mix)	3:07
19.	"Lost in the Sunshine" (Sudlow club mix)	5:40
20.	"Breaking the Circle" (featuring BBC Concert Orchestra) (Radio 2 Piano Room)	4:15
21.	"Hypnotized" (with Wuh Oh)	3:02

== Personnel ==
Musicians

- Sophie Ellis-Bextor – vocals
- Richard Jones – bass guitar, synthesizer, backing vocals
- Jackson Ellis-Leach – drums, percussion
- Seton Daunt – electric guitar
- Pablo Tato – electric guitar, acoustic guitar
- Ed Harcourt – piano, synthesizer, samples, organ, backing vocals
- Simon Byrt – synthesizer
- Gita Langley – violin (track 9)

Technical

- Ed Harcourt – production
- Richard Jones – additional production
- Miles Showell – mastering
- Cenzo Townshend – mixing
- Robert Sellens – engineering
- Camden Clark – mixing assistance

Visuals

- Michael Nash Associates – design
- Laura Lewis – photography
- Sophie Ellis-Bextor – photography

== Charts ==
Chart performance for Hana
Chart (2023)	Peak position
Belgian Albums (Ultratop Flanders)	174
Belgian Albums (Ultratop Wallonia)	88
Scottish Albums (OCC)	5
UK Albums (OCC)	8
UK Independent Albums (OCC)	2

== Release history ==
Release dates and formats for Hana
Region	Date	Format	Label	Ref.
Various	2 June 2023	Digital download; streaming	EGBG's; Cooking Vinyl	
Various	2 June 2023	CD; vinyl; cassette	EGBG's; Cooking Vinyl	
