= Sophie Muller =

English music video director (born 1962)

- Born: Sophie Luise Elisabeth Muller; 31 January 1962 (age 64); London, England
- Occupation: Music video director
- Years active: 1982–present
- Relatives: Robert Muller (screenwriter) (father), Billie Whitelaw (mother), Mae Muller (niece)

Sophie Luise Elisabeth Muller (born 31 January 1962) is an English music video director who has directed over 300 music videos. She won a Grammy Award for Annie Lennox's 1992 Diva video album, and an MTV Video Music Award for Lennox's song "Why" from the same album. In 1993, she received a BRIT Award for "Stay" by Shakespears Sister. She won another MTV Award in 1997 for "Don't Speak" by No Doubt. Muller is a longtime collaborator of Sade, Annie Lennox, Gwen Stefani, Kylie Minogue, Sophie Ellis-Bextor, Garbage and Shakespears Sister.

Muller has also photographed still campaigns and cover art for albums, and provided photographs and art direction for concert tours, concert films, and commercials.

== Background ==
Muller was born in London but spent her early years living in the Isle of Man. After leaving secondary education, she returned to London to attend Central St Martins, studying graphics and gaining a Foundation Diploma in Art. She befriended Sade there; the two later worked together.

Following her graduation, Muller went to the Royal College of Art to study for her Masters in Film and Television, where she made "Interlude" and "In Excelsis Deo" (In Adoration of God). The latter won the J. Walter Thompson Prize for creativity.

Her trademark style of a singer or a band inside a dim room started with "I Need a Man" by Eurythmics, shot in 1987.

== Career ==
Muller's first taste of professional film came working as a third assistant on the 1984 horror/thriller Company of Wolves. She then went on to work for International Film and Video, honoring her for her editing, producing, and directing skills.

Muller's goal was to become a successful director in her own right, and her big break came through a chance meeting with John Stewart (brother of Eurythmics' Dave Stewart) and Billy Poveda of Oil Factory, an established film production company.

She has directed over three hundred music videos and has been a longtime collaborator with Sophie Ellis-Bextor, No Doubt, Shakespears Sister, Garbage, Blur, Annie Lennox and Eurythmics. Her work with Annie Lennox won her a Grammy for the Diva video album. She also picked up an MTV Video Music Award for Lennox's 1992 hit "Why", and was also Grammy nominated for the Eurythmics' 1987 Savage video album. In total, Muller has directed over twenty videos for Lennox and Eurythmics and has a longstanding collaboration with producers Rob Small (UK) and Grant Jue (US).

The video she directed for "Stay" by Shakespears Sister was spoofed by many British comedians at the time, including French & Saunders and Mr. Blobby, and won the BRIT Award and The Music Week Award for Best Video at both of the ceremonies' 1993 Awards.

She has directed fifteen videos for Sophie Ellis-Bextor, including "Take Me Home", "Murder on the Dancefloor", "Catch You", two versions of "Music Gets the Best of Me" and "Love Is a Camera".

Muller directed nine videos for No Doubt as well as nine solo videos for Gwen Stefani. When No Doubt's "Don't Speak" won the award for Best Group Video at the 1997 MTV Video Music Awards, Stefani thanked her extensively, saying "I'd like to say that Sophie Muller is a genius." Stefani has also stated,

Sophie Muller is one of my most talented friends. She can and will only do projects that she is inspired by. She is driven by creativity and the love for what she does and as a result she never compromises. I consider her a true artist. I was a fan of Sophie's work before I even imagined working with her. She has a very pronounced style and taste that drew me in. I think she has the gift of being able to bring out the artist's personality, emotion and style. After working with her for the first time on our "Don't Speak" video, we became close friends [...]. On the set her direction is humble and simple, but she knows what she wants and knows when she gets it. A woman in charge in the male-dominated world of filmmaking makes the whole experience that much more exciting. [...] She has a way of making every cut have a reason and meaning. The videos have a life of their own and become better each time you watch them. I am always in shock the first time I see them and then after a few more times I am actually amazed. She has taught me a lot and I feel very lucky to have worked with her.

The artwork for The Jesus and Mary Chain's 1994 album, Stoned & Dethroned, and the singles accompanying it, is composed entirely of stills from the video to the group's song "Sometimes Always", which was directed by Muller. She also directed the video for "Come On", which also appears on the album.

Muller states that her only ambition is to continue directing to her own high standards and to never grow bored. In 2004, she directed the socially aware video for Sarah McLachlan's "World on Fire", where all but $15 of the entire $150,000 video budget was donated to charities. Recently, she has directed videos for Brandon Flowers, Kings of Leon, Mae Muller, Mika, Tom Odell, Shakira, and the critically acclaimed video for the Dixie Chicks, "Not Ready to Make Nice".

== Videography ==
=== 1980s ===
1982

- Eurythmics – "The Walk" (editing)

1987

- Eurythmics – "Beethoven (I Love to Listen To)"
- Eurythmics – "I Need a Man"

1988

- Eurythmics – "You Have Placed a Chill in My Heart"
- Eurythmics – "Brand New Day"
- Eurythmics – "Do You Want to Break Up?"
- Eurythmics – "Heaven"
- Eurythmics – "I Need You"
- Eurythmics – "Put the Blame on Me"
- Eurythmics – "Savage"
- Eurythmics – "Wide Eyed Girl"
- Sade – "Nothing Can Come Between Us"
- Sade – "Turn My Back on You"
- Sade – "Love Is Stronger Than Pride"
- Shakespears Sister – "Break My Heart"
- Shakespears Sister – "Heroine"
- Annie Lennox featuring Al Green – "Put a Little Love in Your Heart"

1989

- Shakespears Sister – "You're History"
- Shakespears Sister – "Run Silent"
- Sarah Brightman – "Anything but Lonely"
- Pleasure – "Pain"
- Eurythmics – "Don't Ask Me Why"

=== 1990s ===
1990

- Eurythmics – "Angel"
- Julia Fordham – "Lock and Key"
- Sinéad O'Connor – "The Emperor's New Clothes"

1991

- Nanci Griffith – "Late Night Grande Hotel"
- World Party – "Thank You World"
- Curve – "Coast Is Clear"
- Shakespears Sister – "Goodbye Cruel World"

1992

- Annie Lennox – "Why"
- Annie Lennox – "Precious"
- Annie Lennox – "Cold"
- Annie Lennox – "Money Can't Buy It"
- Annie Lennox – "Legend in My Living Room"
- Annie Lennox – "The Gift"
- Annie Lennox – "Primitive"
- Annie Lennox – "Keep Young and Beautiful"
- Annie Lennox – "Walking on Broken Glass"
- Annie Lennox – "Love Song for a Vampire"
- Annie Lennox – "Little Bird"
- Shakespears Sister – "Stay"
- Shakespears Sister – "I Don't Care"
- Shakespears Sister – "Hello (Turn Your Radio On)"
- Vegas – "Possessed"
- Sade – "No Ordinary Love"
- Curve – "Fait Accompli"
- Aaron Neville – "Somewhere, Somebody"

1993

- Björk – "Venus as a Boy"

1994

- Hole – "Miss World"
- The Jesus and Mary Chain featuring Hope Sandoval – "Sometimes Always"
- The Jesus and Mary Chain – "Come On"
- Sparks – "When Do I Get to Sing 'My Way'"

1995

- Come – "Cimarron"
- Sophie B. Hawkins – "As I Lay Me Down"
- Sparks – "When I Kiss You (I Hear Charlie Parker Playing)"
- The Stone Roses – "Ten Storey Love Song"
- Lisa Loeb & Nine Stories – "Do You Sleep?"
- Jeff Buckley – "So Real"
- Weezer – "Say It Ain't So"

1996

- The Cure – "The 13th"
- Kè – "Strange World"
- Gary Barlow – "Forever Love"
- Shakespears Sister – "I Can Drive"
- Johnny Bravo – "Used To Be Cool"
- No Doubt – "Don't Speak"
- No Doubt – "Excuse Me Mr."
- No Doubt – "Sunday Morning"
- The Lightning Seeds – "What If..."

1997

- Blur – "Beetlebum"
- Blur – "Song 2"
- Blur – "On Your Own"
- Maxwell – "Whenever, Wherever, Whatever"
- Curve – "Chinese Burn"
- David Arnold and David McAlmont –"Diamonds Are Forever"
- No Doubt – "Live in the Tragic Kingdom"
- No Doubt – "Oi to the World!"

1998

- James Iha – "Be Strong Now"
- Maxwell – "Luxury: Cococure"
- Sparklehorse – "Pig"
- Sparklehorse – "Sick Of Goodbyes"
- Remy Zero – "Gramarye"
- Garbage – "When I Grow Up" (live version)
- Garbage – "The Trick Is to Keep Breathing"
- Rufus Wainwright – "April Fools"

1999

- Blur – "Tender" (Unreleased)
- Sinéad O'Connor – "Chiquitita"
- Natalie Merchant featuring N'Dea Davenport – "Break Your Heart"
- Sparklehorse – "Pig"
- Manic Street Preachers – "You Stole the Sun from My Heart"
- Garbage – "When I Grow Up" (U.S. version)
- Semisonic – "Secret Smile"
- The Cardigans – "Hanging Around"
- Sarah McLachlan – "Possession" (American version)
- Sarah McLachlan – "I Will Remember You"
- Emilíana Torrini – "To Be Free"
- Beth Orton – "Central Reservation"
- Sarah McLachlan – "Ice Cream"
- Supergrass – "Mary"

=== 2000s ===
2000

- No Doubt – "Simple Kind of Life"
- Ute Lemper – "The Case Continues"
- Doves – "Catch the Sun"
- Bentley Rhythm Ace – "How'd I Do Dat???"
- Alisha's Attic – "Push It All Aside"
- Alisha's Attic – "Pretender Got My Heart"
- JJ72 – "Oxygen"
- PJ Harvey – "Good Fortune"
- No Doubt – "Bathwater"
- Sade – "By Your Side"
- Coldplay – "Trouble" (U.K. Version)
- Jamelia – "Boy Next Door"

2001

- Turin Brakes – "The Door"
- Sade – "King of Sorrow"
- Turin Brakes – "Underdog (Save Me)"
- PJ Harvey – "A Place Called Home"
- Nelly Furtado – "Turn Off the Light"
- Sophie Ellis-Bextor – "Take Me Home"
- PJ Harvey – "This Is Love"
- Radiohead – "I Might Be Wrong"
- Sophie Ellis-Bextor – "Murder on the Dancefloor"

2002

- Amy Studt – "Just a Little Girl"
- Sophie Ellis-Bextor – "Move This Mountain"
- Sugababes – "Freak like Me"
- Coldplay – "In My Place"
- The Beu Sisters – "I Was Only 17"
- Sparta – "Cut Your Ribbon"
- Pink – "Family Portrait"
- No Doubt featuring Lady Saw – "Underneath It All"
- Sophie Ellis-Bextor – "Music Gets the Best of Me" (Day version)
- Sophie Ellis-Bextor – "Music Gets the Best of Me" (Night version)

2003

- Amy Studt – "Misfit"
- Nickel Creek – "Speak"
- Dolly Parton – "I'm Gone"
- Dido – "Life for Rent"
- Pink – "Trouble"
- The Raveonettes – "That Great Love Sound"
- Katy Rose – "Overdrive"
- Sophie Ellis-Bextor – "I Won't Change You" [co-produced]
- No Doubt – "Rock Steady Live"

2004

- Dixie Chicks – "Top of the World"
- The Killers – "Mr. Brightside"
- Sixpence None the Richer – "Don't Dream It's Over"
- Maroon 5 – "This Love"
- Maroon 5 – "She Will Be Loved"
- Nelly Furtado – "Try"
- Mindy Smith – "Come to Jesus"
- Sarah McLachlan – "World on Fire"
- Sarah McLachlan – "Stupid"
- The Strokes – "The End Has No End"
- Natasha Bedingfield – "These Words" (UK version)
- Vanessa Carlton – "White Houses"
- Loretta Lynn featuring Jack White – "Portland, Oregon"

2005

- KT Tunstall – "Black Horse and the Cherry Tree"
- Garbage – "Why Do You Love Me"
- Garbage – "Bleed Like Me"
- Garbage – "Sex Is Not the Enemy"
- Garbage – "Run Baby Run"
- Gwen Stefani – "Cool"
- Coldplay – "Fix You"
- Faith Hill featuring Tim McGraw – "Like We Never Loved at All"
- Gwen Stefani – "Luxurious"

2006

- Gwen Stefani – "Crash"
- Shakira featuring Wyclef Jean – "Hips Don't Lie"
- Dixie Chicks – "Not Ready to Make Nice"
- She Wants Revenge – "These Things"
- Faith Hill – "Stealing Kisses"
- Lily Allen – "Smile"
- Beyoncé featuring Jay-Z – "Deja Vu"
- Beyoncé – "Ring the Alarm"
- The Raconteurs – "Level"
- Gwen Stefani – "Harajuku Lovers Live"
- Gwen Stefani – "Wind It Up"
- Siobhán Donaghy – "Don't Give It Up"

2007

- Sophie Ellis-Bextor – "Catch You"
- Mika – "Grace Kelly"
- Mika – "Grace Kelly" (extended version)
- Gwen Stefani – "4 in the Morning"
- Mika – "Love Today"
- Rufus Wainwright – "Going to a Town"
- Garbage – "Tell Me Where It Hurts"
- Sophie Ellis-Bextor – "Today the Sun's on Us"
- Maroon 5 – "Won't Go Home Without You"
- Gwen Stefani – "Early Winter"

2008

- The Kills – "U.R.A. Fever"
- The Kills – "Cheap and Cheerful"
- The Kills – "Last Day of Magic"
- Leona Lewis – "Better in Time"
- Leona Lewis – "Footprints in the Sand"
- The Ting Tings – "That's Not My Name"
- Gavin Rossdale – "Love Remains The Same"
- Kings of Leon – "Sex on Fire"
- Cold War Kids – "Something Is Not Right with Me"
- Duffy – "Stepping Stone"
- Sarah McLachlan – "U Want Me 2"
- Duffy – "Rain on Your Parade"
- Kings of Leon – "Use Somebody"

2009

- Paloma Faith – "Stone Cold Sober"
- Beyoncé – "Broken-Hearted Girl"
- Shakira – "Did It Again (Normal Version and feat. Kid Cudi)" / Lo Hecho Está Hecho
- No Doubt (as "Snowed Out" on Gossip Girl) – "Stand and Deliver"
- Pink – "I Don't Believe You"
- Shakira – "Give It Up to Me"
- Broken Bells – "The High Road"

=== 2010s ===
2010

- Sade – "Soldier of Love"
- Sade – "Babyfather"
- Armin van Buuren vs. Sophie Ellis-Bextor – "Not Giving Up on Love"
- Cheryl Cole – "Promise This"
- Cheryl Cole – "The Flood"
- Brandon Flowers – "Only The Young"
- Kings of Leon – "Radioactive"

2011

- The Kills – "Satellite"
- Ellie Goulding – "Lights"
- Noah and the Whale – "L.I.F.E.G.O.E.S.O.N."
- Birdy – "Skinny Love"
- Sade – "Love Is Found"

2012

- Alicia Keys – "Girl on Fire"
- No Doubt – "Settle Down"
- Beyoncé – "I Was Here"
- No Doubt – "Push and Shove"
- Labrinth featuring Emeli Sandé – "Beneath Your Beautiful"

2013

- Rihanna – "Stay"
- Tom Odell – "Hold Me"
- Garbage and Screaming Females – "Because the Night"
- Lana Del Rey – "Young and Beautiful" (with Chris Sweeney)
- Pink featuring Lily Allen – "True Love"
- Birdy – "Wings"
- Sophie Ellis-Bextor – "Wanderlust" (Album Trailer)
- Sophie Ellis-Bextor – "Young Blood"
- John Mayer featuring Katy Perry – "Who You Love"
- Robin Thicke – "Feel Good"
- Katy B – "Crying for No Reason (with Ross McDowell)"

2014

- Sophie Ellis-Bextor – "Runaway Daydreamer"
- Tim McGraw – "Lookin' for That Girl"
- Birdy – "Words As Weapons"
- Katy B – "Still"
- Garbage – "Girls Talk"
- Sophie Ellis-Bextor – "Love Is a Camera"
- OneRepublic – "I Lived" (idea)
- OneRepublic – "Love Runs Out"
- Gwen Stefani – "Baby Don't Lie"
- Gwen Stefani – "Spark the Fire"
- Labrinth – "Jealous"
- Beck – "Heart Is a Drum"
- Sam Smith – "Like I Can"

2015

- Garbage – "The Chemicals"
- Selena Gomez – "Good for You" (Version 1)
- Selena Gomez featuring ASAP Rocky – "Good for You" (Version 2)
- James Bay – "Let It Go (Behind the Scenes)"
- James Bay – "If You Ever Want to Be in Love"
- Misty Miller – "Happy"
- One Direction – "Perfect"
- Gwen Stefani – "Used to Love You"

2016

- Gwen Stefani – "Make Me Like You"
- The Kills – "Heart of a Dog"
- Gwen Stefani – "Misery"
- Sophie Ellis-Bextor – Familia album trailer
- Sophie Ellis-Bextor – "Come With Us"
- Sophie Ellis-Bextor – "Crystallise"
- The Dead Weather – "Impossible Winner"
- Gwen Stefani – "Kuu Kuu Harajuku" (Theme Song Music Video)
- Noah Cyrus – "Make Me (Cry)"

2017

- Wolf Alice – "Don't Delete the Kisses"
- Sophie Ellis-Bextor – "Wild Forever"
- London Grammar – "Big Picture"
- The Kills – "Whirling Eye"
- Tim McGraw and Faith Hill – "Speak to a Girl"
- Sophie Ellis-Bextor – "Death of Love"
- Shock Machine – "Strange Waves"
- Shock Machine – "Unlimited Love"
- Morrissey – "Spent the Day in Bed"
- Bebe Rexha feat. Florida Georgia Line – "Meant to Be"

2018

- Kylie Minogue – "Dancing"
- Julia Michaels – "Heaven"
- Kylie Minogue featuring Gente de Zona – "Stop Me from Falling" (Remix)
- CLOVES – Bringing the House Down
- Pete Yorn & Scarlett Johansson – "Bad Dreams"
- Kylie Minogue – "Golden"
- Freya Ridings – Lost Without You
- Bebe Rexha – "I'm a Mess"
- Cheryl – "Love Made Me Do It"
- Lo Moon – "Real Love"
- Westside Cast – "Believe in Dreams"
- Leo Gallo – "Future Is In My Hands"
- Alexandra Kay – "You Think You Know Someone"
- Arika Gluck & Taz Zavala – "Beauty and the Struggle"
- Gwen Stefani feat. Blake Shelton – "You Make It Feel Like Christmas"

2019

- MARINA – "Handmade Heaven" (Original and Vertical Videos)
- Dido – "Give You Up"
- Lil Pump ft. Lil Wayne – "Be Like Me"
- MARINA – "Orange Trees" (Original and Vertical Videos)
- Blake Shelton – "God's Country"
- Shakespears Sister – "All the Queen's Horses"
- Shakespears Sister – "When She Finds You"
- Jax Jones feat. Bebe Rexha – "Harder"
- Tiësto, Jonas Blue & Rita Ora – "Ritual"
- Easy Life – "Earth"
- Bebe Rexha – "Not 20 Anymore"
- Bebe Rexha – "You Can't Stop the Girl"
- Blake Shelton – "Hell Right"
- Selena Gomez – "Lose You to Love Me"
- Selena Gomez – "Look at Her Now"

=== 2020s ===
2020

- Selena Gomez – "Lose You to Love Me" (Alternative Video)
- Selena Gomez – "Look at Her Now" (Alternative Video)
- Mae Muller – "So Annoying"
- Mae Muller – "I Don't Want Your Money"
- James Righton – "Start"
- Blake Shelton feat. Gwen Stefani – "Nobody But You"
- Kylie Minogue – "Say Something"
- Kylie Minogue – "Magic"
- Sophie Ellis-Bextor – "Crying at the Discotheque"

2021

- Birdy – "Surrender"
- Birdy – "Loneliness"
- Maroon 5 feat. Megan Thee Stallion – "Beautiful Mistakes"
- Maroon 5 – "Lost"
- Gwen Stefani & Saweetie – "Slow Clap (Remix)"
- LILHUDDY – "America's Sweetheart"
- Selena Gomez & Camilo – "999"
- Kylie Minogue & Years & Years – "A Second to Midnight"
- Kylie Minogue & Jessie Ware – "Kiss of Life"
- ABBA – "Little Things"

2022

- Sophie Ellis-Bextor & Wuh Oh – "Hypnotized"
- Kylie Minogue & Gloria Gaynor – "Can't Stop Writing Songs About You"
- Kylie Minogue – "Miss a Thing"
- Benson Boone – "Better Alone"
- Zella Day – "Mushroom Punch"

2023

- Kylie Minogue – "Padam Padam"
- Sophie Ellis-Bextor – Lost in the Sunshine
- Jessie Ware & Róisín Murphy – "Freak Me Now" (with Theo Adams)
- Jessie Ware – "Pearls"
- Kylie Minogue – Tension
- PinkPantheress – "Mosquito"

2024

- The Blessed Madonna & Kylie Minogue – "Edge of Saturday Night"
- Kylie Minogue – "Lights Camera Action"
- Sophie Ellis-Bextor – "Freedom of the Night"
- Sade – "Young Lion"

2025

- Kylie Minogue & Alok – "Last Night I Dreamt I Fell in Love"
- Sophie Ellis-Bextor – "Stay on Me"

2026

- MEEK – "Fabulous" (with Theo Adams)
- MEEK – "Beautiful Freeks" (with Theo Adams)

== Filmography ==
- Eurythmics: Savage: Video Album (1987)
- Annie Lennox: Diva: Video Album (1992)
- Jiggery Pockery (1994)
- Sunny Day (2007)
- L", a L.A.M.B., Fragrance by Gwen Stefani (2007)
- L'Oreal Paris Infalliable Le Gloss Lipgloss by Gwen Stefani (2011)
- Sade: Bring Me Home: Live 2011 (2012)
- Maroon 5: American Express Unstaged. (2021)
- Alexander McQueen – Lucia: The Jewelled Satchel, Storm Chasing, Mycelium & MettieNarrative (2022)
- Redazione – AMQ SS22 (2022)
- Kylie Minogue – "Disco Darling" fragrance (2023)
