= The Song Diaries =

Compilation album by Sophie Ellis-Bextor
- Released: 15 March 2019
- Recorded: 2017–2018
- Genre: Disco
- Length: 73:18
- Label: EBGB's; Cooking Vinyl
- Producer: Ed Harcourt; Richard "Biff" Stannard; Ash Howes

Sophie Ellis-Bextor chronology
Familia (2016)	The Song Diaries (2019)	Songs from the Kitchen Disco (2020)

Singles from The Song Diaries
- 1. "Love Is You" Released: 11 August 2018; 2. "A Pessimist Is Never Disappointed" Released: 8 March 2019

The Song Diaries is a compilation album by English singer Sophie Ellis-Bextor, released on 15 March 2019 by EBGB's. Made in collaboration with Ed Harcourt, the album consists primarily of orchestral versions of Ellis-Bextor's solo singles, including her collaboration with Italian DJ Spiller, "Groovejet (If This Ain't Love)", and a song from her time as part of Theaudience, "A Pessimist Is Never Disappointed". It was called an "orchestral greatest hits" by Clash. Ellis-Bextor toured the UK with a full orchestra and band in support of the album from June 2019.

== Background ==
Plans for and the beginning of recording for the album were first announced on PledgeMusic in December 2017. Throughout the recording process, Sophie posted videos and snippets of the songs she was working on plus commentaries on the work in progress, both on PledgeMusic and her social media.

== Concept ==
The Official Charts Company stated that due to the immediate availability of an artist's back catalogue in the streaming era, "the concept of a greatest hits has changed, with many artists opting to re-work their hits to give them a fresh spin", comparing it to Take That's 2018 greatest hits Odyssey.

== Track listing ==
All tracks produced by Ed Harcourt, except "Love Is You" produced by Richard "Biff Stannard and Ash Howes of Biffco.

No.	Title	Writer(s)	Length
1.	"Groovejet"	Sophie Ellis-Bextor; Cristiano Spiller; Rob Davis; Vincent Montana Jr.; Ronald Walker	3:20
2.	"Take Me Home"	Ellis-Bextor; Bob Esty; Michele Aller	4:23
3.	"Murder on the Dancefloor"	Ellis-Bextor; Gregg Alexander	3:46
4.	"Move This Mountain"	Ellis-Bextor; Alex James; Ben Hillier	4:47
5.	"Music Gets the Best of Me"	Ellis-Bextor; Alexander; Matt Rowe	3:28
6.	"Mixed Up World"	Ellis-Bextor; Alexander; Rowe	3:43
7.	"Catch You"	Cathy Dennis; Greg Kurstin; Rhys Barker	3:58
8.	"Me and My Imagination"	Ellis-Bextor; Hannah Robinson; Matthew Prime	3:47
9.	"Today the Sun's on Us"	Ellis-Bextor; Steve Robson; Nina Woodford	4:19
10.	"Heartbreak (Make Me a Dancer)"	Ellis-Bextor; James Wiltshire; Russell Small; Richard Stannard	3:52
11.	"Bittersweet"	Ellis-Bextor; Wiltshire; Small; Stannard; Robinson	3:35
12.	"Not Giving Up on Love"	Ellis-Bextor; Olivia Nervo; Miriam Nervo; Armin van Buuren; Benno de Goeij	3:14
13.	"Young Blood"	Ellis-Bextor; Harcourt	4:39
14.	"Love Is a Camera"	Ellis-Bextor; Harcourt	3:57
15.	"Wild Forever"	Ellis-Bextor; Harcourt	4:31
16.	"A Pessimist Is Never Disappointed"	Billy Reeves	4:04
17.	"Love Is You" (bonus track)	Vincent Montana Jr.; Walker	3:15
18.	"Take Me Home" (orchestral disco version) (bonus track)	Ellis-Bextor; Esty; Aller	3:14
19.	"Murder on the Dancefloor" (orchestral disco version) (bonus track)	Ellis-Bextor; Alexander	3:26
Total length:			73:18

== Charts ==
Chart (2019)	Peak position
Australian Digital Albums (ARIA)	43
Scottish Albums (OCC)	10
UK Albums (OCC)	14
UK Independent Albums (OCC)	3
US Classical Albums (Billboard)	22
