= The Deer & the Wolf =

Single by Sophie Ellis-Bextor

from the album Wanderlust
- Released: 25 August 2014
- Recorded: 2013–14
- Genre: Indie pop, folk pop
- Length: 3:27
- Label: EBGB's
- Songwriters: Sophie Ellis-Bextor; Ed Harcourt
- Producer: Ed Harcourt

Sophie Ellis-Bextor singles chronology
"Love Is a Camera" (2014)	"The Deer & the Wolf" (2014)	"Come With Us" (2016)

Music video
- "Sophie Ellis-Bextor - The Deer & The Wolf (Official video)" on YouTube

"The Deer & the Wolf" is a song by English recording artist Sophie Ellis-Bextor from her fifth studio album Wanderlust (2014). The song was released as the fourth and final single of the album on 25 August 2014. It was co-written by Ed Harcourt and Ellis-Bextor; whilst production was handled by the former. It was remixed under the name of "The Deer & The Wolf (Role Reversal)" for the Wandermix edition of the album.

The music video for the song was directed by Harry Cauty of Kode Media, and features Ellis-Bextor performing the song in a forest set with her band. A month later, Sophie uploaded an acoustic version of the song to her official YouTube account, played with the whole band lying on a bed.

== Track listing ==
Promotional CD single

Details adapted from the liner notes of "The Deer & the Wolf"'s CD single.

1. "The Deer & the Wolf" (Radio edit) – 3:27

== Release history ==
Region	Date	Format	Label
Worldwide	25 August 2014	Digital download; streaming	EBGB's
