= Runaway Daydreamer =

2014 song performed by Sophie Ellis-Bextor

Single by Sophie Ellis-Bextor

from the album Wanderlust
- Released: 31 March 2014
- Recorded: State of the Ark; (Richmond, London)
- Genre: Pop, folk
- Length: 4:00
- Label: EBGB's
- Songwriters: Sophie Ellis-Bextor; Ed Harcourt
- Producer: Ed Harcourt

Sophie Ellis-Bextor singles chronology
"Young Blood" (2013)	"Runaway Daydreamer" (2014)	"Love Is a Camera" (2014)

Music video
- "Sophie Ellis-Bextor - Runaway Daydreamer (Official video)" on YouTube

"Runaway Daydreamer" is a song by the English recording artist Sophie Ellis-Bextor for her fifth studio album Wanderlust (2014). The song was released on 31 March 2014 as the second single of the album. Composed by Ed Harcourt with additional writing by Ellis-Bextor, it is a chamber pop track which features percussion and string instruments. Its lyrics, written in a way resemblant of nursery rhymes, expound on escapism and "self discovery".

"Runaway Daydreamer" received mostly positive reviews from music critics, who praised Ellis-Bextor's vocals and its sound; some denoted it as a highlight of Wanderlust. The song was promoted with a music video directed by Sophie Muller, which largely shows Ellis-Bextor in a lounge room and walking through an abandoned pier. It was also performed on programmes including ITV's Loose Women, and peaked at number 29 on the UK Indie chart.

== Composition and reception ==
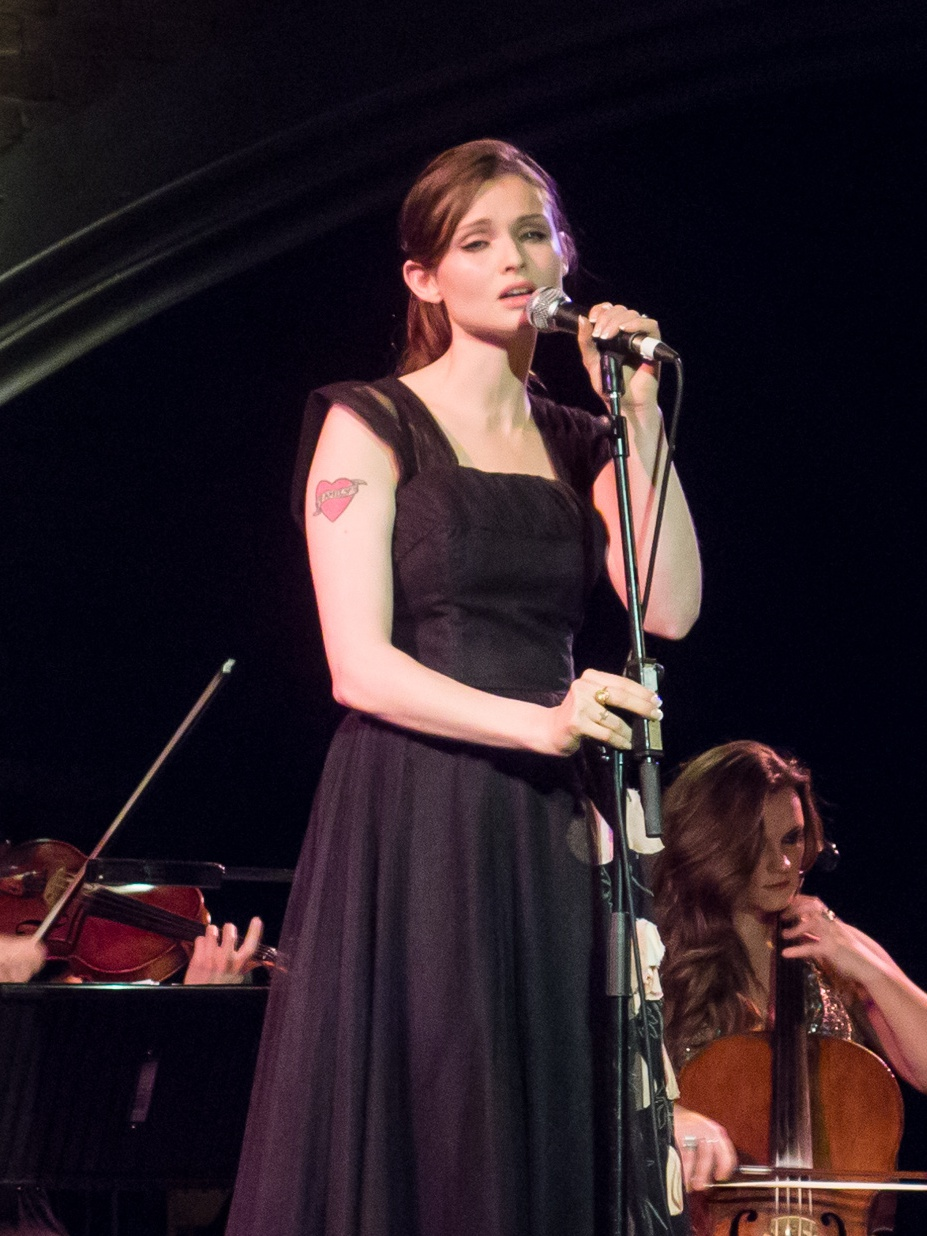
Ellis-Bextor performing

"Runaway Daydreamer", as with the rest of Wanderlust, was co-written by its producer Ed Harcourt along with Ellis-Bextor. It was recorded at the State of the Ark studios, mixed and engineered by Richard Woodcruft, and mastered by Miles Showell. It is a chamber pop track which includes string arrangements and "shuffled percussion". Clare Considine of Time Out compared its sonority to that of a Humphrey Bogart movie soundtrack. AllMusic's Stephen Thomas Erlewine described the track as a "girl group homage". Davidf Farrell of PopMatters opined that the song and "Until the Stars Collide" set a "soaring, dreamy" atmosphere for Wanderlust. According to the sheet music published by Music Sales Group, the song contains 116 beats per minute in crotchet. Its introduction follows a chord progression of C—F/C—C—F/C—C—F/C—C—F, and transitions into the verse section in which the notes C–F–C are followed. The track is composed in the traditional verse–chorus form. Ellis-Bextor's vocals during the song incorporate the melisma technique and span from G_{3} to E_{5}.

The song's lyrics, which discuss escapism, are constructed in a way resemblant of nursery rhymes. During the chorus, Ellis-Bextor sings "It's just my imagination / Running away / Girl's gotta have a little daydream / It's a secret escape / It's just my imagination / Running away / Don't worry baby, I'm here to stay". Considine highlighted "I could tie up the bed sheets and slide down the house / Be gone before the morning comes" as lyrics exemplificative of Ellis-Bextor's "artistic freedom" in Wanderlust. Reviewing the song for Loud and Quiet, Stuart Stubbs wrote that it "sees our protagonist pull herself out of squalor and onto a road of self discovery." The song concludes with a short outro where Ellis-Bextor repeats the line "Don't worry baby, I'm here to stay" twice.

On behalf of Virgin Media, Matthew Horton opined that "Runaway Daydreamer" was the standout of Wanderlust, describing Ellis-Bextor's vocals in it as "prim and gorgeous". James Fyfe of The 405 echoed his view, praising Ellis-Bextor's vocal performance, as well as highlighting its sonority, despite observing it was not "musically adventurous". Writing for Digital Spy, Robert Copsey billed the song as beautiful and "shimmering". Thomas Erlewine highlighted the song as a standout, commenting that the album was "at its best when it's slightly dexterous", citing the song as an example. The Irish Times' Louise Bruton wrote that the song explores "twee danger zones" and called it a "blunder".

== Release and promotion ==
A promotional CD single including "Runaway Daydreamer"'s radio edit, with a length of 3 minutes and 27 seconds, was sent to radio stations in March 2014. The song was released in the United Kingdom on 23 March 2014. The music video for "Runaway Daydreamer" was directed by Sophie Muller, and released on 8 March 2014; it was mostly filmed during the taping of the video for "Young Blood"—Wanderlust's previous single. Ellis-Bextor lip-synchs the song's lyrics inside a lounge room, wearing a white lace dress, with her hair gathered into a ponytail; she is also seen walking through an abandoned pier, dining at a restaurant and posing in front of a small white house. The visual's aspect ratio is changed throughout, ranging from windowbox to letterbox. Ellis-Bextor performed the song in an acoustic setting, on the morning programme ZDF Morgenmagazin, aired on 23 January 2014 on German channel ZDF. On 17 March of that year, she sang it on ITV's Loose Women. The song charted on the UK Indie Singles at number 29.

== Track listing ==
Promotional CD single

Details adapted from the credits of the CD single of "Runaway Daydeamer".

1. "Runaway Daydreamer" (Radio edit) – 3:27

== Credits and personnel ==
Credits adapted from the liner notes of Wanderlust.

- Sophie Ellis-Bextor – lead vocals, songwriting
- Ed Harcourt – songwriting, production, background vocals, samples, synth, keyboards, piano
- Gita Langley – violin
- Richard Woodcraft – engineering, mixing
- Miles Showell – mastering

== Weekly charts ==
Chart (2014)	Peak position
UK Indie (OCC)	29

== Release history ==
Country	Date	Format	Label	Ref.
United Kingdom	2014	Promotional CD single	EBGB's	
United Kingdom	31 March 2014	—	EBGB's	
