= Hypnotized (Sophie Ellis-Bextor song) =

Single by Sophie Ellis-Bextor and Wuh Oh

from the album Hana (Deluxe)
- Released: 6 July 2022
- Recorded: 2022
- Genre: Europop; nu-disco; avant-pop
- Length: 3:03
- Label: Douglas Valentine; Cooking Vinyl
- Composer: Wuh Oh
- Lyricist: Sophie Ellis-Bextor
- Producers: Wuh Oh; Sega Bodega

Sophie Ellis-Bextor singles chronology
"Crying at the Discotheque" (2020)	"Hypnotized" (2022)	"Breaking the Circle" (2023)

Music video
- "Hypnotized" on YouTube

"Hypnotized" is a song by the English singer Sophie Ellis-Bextor and the Scottish musician Wuh Oh, released on 6 July 2022 by Douglas Valentine and Cooking Vinyl Records. Initially released as a standalone single, it was later included on the deluxe edition of Ellis-Bextor's seventh studio album Hana (2023).

== Background ==
The song was written by Wuh Oh and Sophie Ellis-Bextor, and produced by Wuh Oh and Sega Bodega. It was first performed live by Ellis-Bextor on her Kitchen Disco Tour in March 2022. In May, a snippet of the song was previewed by Bodega on his social media.

A live version of the song, which includes an extra verse, was included on the concert album Kitchen Disco – Live at the London Palladium.

"Hypnotized" was described as an "avant-pop", "disco-pop", "icy club banger".

Ellis-Bextor performed the song on the Yarra River for the Australian breakfast TV show Sunrise.

== Music video ==
The music video was directed by Ellis-Bextor's longtime collaborator Sophie Muller and filmed at Glasgow's Barrowland Ballroom. The cinematographer was Robbie Ryan. The video pictures Ellis-Bextor clad in a tight black latex dress designed by Atsuko Kudo in a Dita Von Teese-inspired styling. She performs sharp dance routines in front of a group of dancers in an abandoned theatre, leading them in a hypnotic cult-like manner. It also features Wuh Oh playing music at the DJ deck. The clip premiered on 26 July 2022.

== Track listings ==
- Digital download/streaming
1. "Hypnotized" – 3:03
- Digital download/streaming (Sega Bodega Version)
1. "Hypnotized" (Sega Bodega Version) – 2:41
- Digital download/streaming (Remixes)
1. "Hypnotized" (PS1 Remix) – 3:00
2. "Hypnotized" (PS1 Remix - Extended Version) – 3:55
3. "Hypnotized" – 3:03
4. "Hypnotized" (Sega Bodega Version) – 2:41
5. "Hypnotized" (Extended Version) – 3:32
- Streaming (Live)
1. "Hypnotized" (Live) – 3:10
2. "Like a Prayer" (Live) – 5:07

== Charts ==
Weekly chart performance for "Hypnotized"
Chart (2022)	Peak position
UK Singles Downloads (Official Charts)	37
