= Love Is a Camera =

Single by Sophie Ellis-Bextor

from the album Wanderlust
- Released: 23 June 2014
- Genre: Tango; baroque; polka
- Length: 4:13
- Label: EBGB's
- Songwriter(s): Ellis-Bextor; Ed Harcourt
- Producer(s): Harcourt

Sophie Ellis-Bextor singles chronology
"Runaway Daydreamer" (2014)	"Love Is a Camera" (2014)	"The Deer & the Wolf" (2014)

Music video
- "Sophie Ellis-Bextor - Love Is A Camera (Official video)" on YouTube

"Love Is a Camera" is a song performed by English recording artist Sophie Ellis-Bextor for her fifth album Wanderlust (2014). Ellis-Bextor co-wrote the song with Ed Harcourt, who also produced the track. Its lyrics recount the story of a woman who takes photos of her victims and keeps their souls in the pictures. Musically, the song features piano, guitars, double bass, and influences of tango and baroque. "Love Is a Camera" was serviced to hot adult contemporary radio stations in the United Kingdom as the third single from Wanderlust. The song was released on 23 June 2014.

Upon release, its lyrics and composition attained praise and ambivalence from music critics. To accompany the song's release, Sophie Muller was enlisted as the director for the music video of "Love Is a Camera", which was filmed in the Italian city of Florence. Its storyline features Ellis-Bextor impersonating two characters, one being a "temptress" and the other being an unsuspecting woman. The former convinces a man who is attracted to her, and the latter, to take their picture; the unsuspecting characters are ultimately trapped in their portraits. The track has been performed during Ellis-Bextor's gigs, for promoting her record Wanderlust. The track was re-recorded with an orchestra for Ellis-Bextor's 2019 greatest hits album The Song Diaries.

== Composition and reception ==
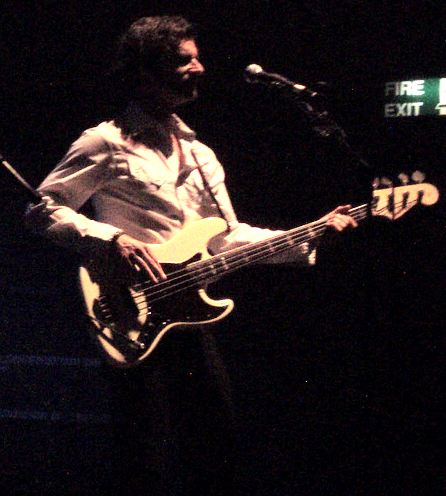
Arnulf Lindner played double bass for "Love Is a Camera"

"Love Is a Camera" was the first song to be developed for Ellis-Bextor's fifth record, Wanderlust. Ellis-Bextor co-wrote the song with its producer Ed Harcourt. Harcourt produced the track. David Farrell of PopMatters described the track as a "plodding tango", while The Daily Telegraph writer Neil McCormick deemed it an "elaborate baroque quasi-ballad". From The Irish Times, Louise Bruton called the song a "hectic slice of vaudevillian fun". Its instrumentation comprises "florid" guitar chords, "stalking" pianos and a double bass played by Harcourt. Andy Gill of The Independent credited the first two instruments with providing "an Iron Curtain feel" to the track. The final part of the song—characterised by Time Out reviewer Clare Considine as one of Wanderlust's "more energetic moments"—incorporates a "gypsy polka" sound. During that part, Ellis-Bextor's voice is paired with an "increasingly frantic piano".

The song's lyrics were influenced by Russian folklore. Ellis-Bextor denoted her literary choices—as a child and a student—as influences for the song, listing Russian fairytales, folk stories and Emily Dickinson's works as examples. She took inspiration from the humour and mystery from the serial drama Twin Peaks. "Love Is a Camera" narrates the story of a "spooky old" woman who lives "in a house on the hill", and takes pictures of individuals, only to preserve their souls in the photographs "behind glass". Farrell interpreted that the protagonist took their photographs to "preserve their memories".

Farrell exalted the lyricism of the song, stating that "Sophie's music has never sounded so lyrically rich" and her "storytelling skills" were visible in it. Considine named the song a "welcome break from lullabies (such as 'The Deer and the Wolf') that risk monotony" on the album. Conversely, AllMusic's Stephen Thomas Erlewine described "Love Is a Camera" as a "bogged down in pretension" moment in Wanderlust; Erlewine went on to criticize the song's "ceaseless pomp". Kate Bennett of musicOMH wrote that "Love Is a Camera" was "more of the same" "heroine-gazing-forlornly-into-the-distance." She elaborated, "You'd have to have a heart of cold, igneous rock not to enjoy [this track] just a little, but if you were never a member of your local youth theatre company the sticky-sweetness of it all quickly becomes cloying." The song peaked at number 32 on the UK Airplay Chart, while on the UK Indie Chart it reached number 33.

== Release and promotion ==
As announced in a press release, "Love Is a Camera" was released as the third single of Wanderlust on 23 June 2014. The song was serviced to hot adult contemporary stations in the United Kingdom; it was included in the A-List of BBC Radio 2. A promotional Compact Disc single was sent out to radio stations, including a shortened version of the song, dubbed its "radio edit".

Sophie Muller directed the music video for "Love Is a Camera", which was released on 30 May 2014. The video commences with Ellis-Bextor, who plays an "eerie temptress" dressed in a black "ankle-length, lace-trimmed" gown, walking and dancing slowly inside a classical mansion. While wandering through her house, she starts adjusting picture frames, which hold monochromatic photographs of individuals. One of those pictures depicts a pony-tailed woman, dressed in white—also played by Ellis-Bextor—who starts mimicking the song, whilst in the frame. The story of the woman in the frame is told throughout the video—after crossing a field, she finds the mansion. Her photograph is taken by the dressed-in-black Ellis-Bextor, and she is trapped in the frame. Whilst walking down an outdoors staircase, the "temptress" passes by a bearded man who stares at her with interest. Both enter the mansion, where they drink; the dressed-in-black Ellis-Bextor holds his hand. She convinces him to take his photograph, and after realizing it is a trap, he tries to escape. However, the "temptress" finds him running and takes his photograph; trapping him in a frame as well.

"Love Is a Camera" has been performed throughout Ellis-Bextor's 2014 tour in promotion of Wanderlust. Whilst singing the track, Ellis-Bextor would reference her participation on Strictly Come Dancing and dance a "half-hearted sway", as musicOMH's Helen Clarke described it. Reviewing her concert at the Bush Hall, James Lachno of The Daily Telegraph lauded Ellis-Bextor's performance of the song. Lachno stated, "[It was] one of the oddest, and best, songs of the night." After attending Ellis-Bextor's concert at the Oran Mor, an anonymous writer for The Scotsman commented that the song "sounded grand in the live setting".

== Track listing ==
Promotional CD single

Details adapted from the liner notes of "Love Is a Camera"'s CD single.

1. "Love Is a Camera" (Radio edit) – 3:21

== Credits and personnel ==
Credits adapted from the liner notes of Wanderlust.

- Sophie Ellis-Bextor – lead vocals, songwriting
- Ed Harcourt – backing vocals, guitar, keyboards, piano, production, samples, synth
- Arnulf Lindner – double bass
- Richard Woodcraft – engineering, mixing
- Miles Showell – mastering

== Charts ==
Chart (2014)	Peak position
UK Airplay (Radiomonitor)	32
UK Indie Singles (Official Charts Company)	32

== Release history ==
Country	Date	Format	Label	Ref.
United Kingdom	2014	Promotional CD single	EBGB's	
United Kingdom	19 May 2014	Hot adult contemporary	EBGB's	
United Kingdom	23 June 2014	Digital download	EBGB's	
