= Wanderlust (Sophie Ellis-Bextor album) =

Studio album by Sophie Ellis-Bextor
- Released: 20 January 2014
- Recorded: State of the Ark (Richmond, London); The Bulgarian Embassy (London)
- Genre: Indie pop; folk; baroque pop
- Length: 40:56
- Label: EBGB's
- Producer: Ed Harcourt

Sophie Ellis-Bextor chronology
| Make a Scene (2011) | Wanderlust (2014) | Familia (2016) |

Singles from Wanderlust
- 1. "Young Blood" Released: 21 November 2013; 2. "Runaway Daydreamer" Released: 31 March 2014; 3. "Love Is a Camera" Released: 23 June 2014; 4. "The Deer & the Wolf" Released: 25 August 2014

Wanderlust is the fifth studio album by English singer and songwriter Sophie Ellis-Bextor, released on 20 January 2014 by EBGB's. The album marks a sharp shift from Ellis-Bextor's electronic dance roots, incorporating elements of folk, baroque and orchestral music. It was featured as BBC Radio 2's "Album of the Week" on 18 January 2014.

A double-disc repackaged version was released on 3 November 2014 and included a remix version of the album.

== Singles ==
The album's lead single, "Young Blood", was offered as a free download on Ellis-Bextor's official website on 26 March 2013, before being officially released on iTunes on 21 November 2013. The single reached number thirty-four on the UK Singles Chart and number three on the UK Indie Singles Chart. The accompanying music video was directed by Sophie Muller.

On 31 March 2014, "Runaway Daydreamer" was released as the second single from the album. The music video was also directed by Muller. It peaked at number 29 on the UK Indie Chart.

The album's third single, "Love Is a Camera", was released on 23 June, with the video filmed in Florence, Italy on 30 April, again by Muller. The single was added straight onto the BBC Radio 2's A-list playlist.

"The Deer & the Wolf" was released on 24 August as the fourth and final single from the album. The video was shot in London by director Harry Cauty.

== Critical reception ==
Professional ratings
Aggregate scores
| Source | Rating |
|---|---|
| Metacritic | 65/100 |
Review scores
| Source | Rating |
| AllMusic | 3.5/5 stars |
| Clash | 8/10 |
| The Daily Telegraph | 3/5 stars |
| Digital Spy | 3/5 stars |
| The Guardian | 3/5 stars |
| The Irish Times | 3/5 stars |
| musicOMH | 2.5/5 stars |
| The Independent | 2/5 stars |
| The Observer | 2/5 stars |
| Virgin Media | 4/5 stars |

Wanderlust received generally positive reviews from music critics. At Metacritic, which assigns a normalised rating out of 100 to reviews from mainstream critics, the album received an average score of 65 based on 12 reviews, which indicates "generally favorable reviews", while aggregating website AnyDecentMusic? reports a score of 6.1 based on fourteen professional reviews. Gareth James of Clash found the album "quite remarkable", and described the songs as "grand and ambitious." Matthew Horton of Virgin Media wrote that Ellis-Bextor "has decided on a change of tack [...] that has brought out the best in her," and called the songs "almost without exception, marvelous." John Paul Lucas of So So Gay found Wanderlust "bold, ambitious and frequently surprising" and wrote that it "feels like an arrival, and potentially the most important album of her career." Robert Copsey of Digital Spy described it as "a brave excursion into something surprisingly off-kilter for a traditionally top 40 popstar," however he felt that its lyrics sound "occasionally sappy and sentimental." Caroline Sullivan of The Guardian noticed "the preponderance of sweeping string-and-piano arrangements" and noted that "what really sells this album is its forays into eastern European-style pathos."

Louise Bruton of The Irish Times compared the album's sound to the Norwegian folk/pop band Katzenjammer and felt that "as a breakaway from her usual dancefloor dalliances, Sophie chose wisely." Neil McCormick of The Daily Telegraph described Wanderlust as "an odd mix of colourful and melodious songs with thoughtful lyrics and lush, slightly wonky arrangements," while also noticing a "lack [of] an emotional centre." Kate Bennett of musicOMH stated that "Sophie Ellis-Bextor has just abandoned her electropop comfort blanket for a smothering duvet of clichés and ineffectual romanticism," while Hermiony Hobby of The Observer felt that she "sounds like a nine-year-old girl" and called the album's arrangements "more saccharine than stirring." Andy Gill of The Independent noted Wanderlust's "Eastern European flavour" and suggested that Ellis-Bextor is "re-positioning herself in the prim Nordic-diva territory of Agnes Obel and Ane Brun." Ludovic Hunter-Tilney of the Financial Times noticed that "she sings with more feeling than her electro-pop days but the album suffers from a plodding pace."

== Commercial performance ==
Wanderlust debuted on the UK Albums Chart at number four with 10,844 copies sold in its first week, becoming Ellis-Bextor's highest-charting solo album since 2001's Read My Lips, the revised edition of which peaked at number two in mid 2002. The following week, it fell to number five with sales of 8,520 copies. The album slipped to number nine in its third week, selling 7,231 copies. The album now has the second-longest chart run of any Sophie Ellis-Bextor album (after Read My Lips), having spent fourteen consecutive weeks in the top 75 as of 27 April 2014. It was awarded a Silver certification by the BPI after selling 60,000 copies in the UK.

== Wanderlust Tour ==
Ellis-Bextor supported the album's release with a sold-out and critically acclaimed show at the Bush Hall in London on 21 January 2014. She later announced a full-UK tour. Festival dates and a second leg of the tour around the UK were announced in late April. The regular setlist consisted of playing most of the songs from the album (frequent exceptions were "Interlude" and "Wrong Side of the Sun") and very few older hits on the encores, mainly "Murder on the Dancefloor", "Groovejet", "Take Me Home" and "Heartbreak (Make Me a Dancer)".

Sophie won the Best Live Act prize at the AIM Awards held on 2 September 2014 in London.

Tour dates
| Date | City | Country | Venue |
United Kingdom (1st leg)
| 7 April 2014 | Birmingham | England | Digbeth Institute |
| 8 April 2014 | Oxford | England | O2 Academy Oxford |
| 10 April 2014 | London | England | Union Chapel |
| 11 April 2014 | London | England | Union Chapel |
| 13 April 2014 | Bournemouth | England | O2 Academy Bournemouth |
| 14 April 2014 | Brighton | England | Concorde 2 |
| 15 April 2014 | Bristol | England | O2 Academy Bristol |
| 17 April 2014 | Gateshead | England | The Sage Gateshead |
| 18 April 2014 | Manchester | England | The Ritz |
| 19 April 2014 | Glasgow | Scotland | Oran Mor |
| 20 April 2014 | Glasgow | Scotland | Oran Mor |
United Kingdom (2nd leg)
| 24 September 2014 | Cambridge | England | Junction |
| 25 September 2014 | Norwich | England | Waterfront |
| 27 September 2014 | Holmfirth | England | The Picturedome |
| 28 September 2014 | Edinburgh | Scotland | Queen's Hall |
| 29 September 2014 | Milton Keynes | England | The Stables |
| 1 October 2014 | London | England | Shepherd's Bush Empire |
European dates
| 3 October 2014 | St. Petersburg | Russia | A2 Club |
| 4 October 2014 | Moscow | Russia | Ray Just Arena |

Festival dates
| Date | City | Country | Festival |
Europe
| 3 May 2014 | Zurich | Switzerland | Energy Fashion Night |
| 27 June 2014 | Pilton, Somerset | England | Glastonbury Festival |
| 29 June 2014 | Westport | Ireland | Westport Festival |
| 4 July 2014 | Oxfordshire | England | Cornbury Festival |
| 6 July 2014 | Kent | England | Hop Farm Festival |
| 4 July 2014 | Balado | Scotland | T in the Park |
| 2 August 2014 | Isle of Wight | England | Camp Bestival |
| 3 August 2014 | Oulton Park, Yorkshire | England | Carfest North |
| 16 August 2014 | Chelmsford | England | V Festival |
| 17 August 2014 | Staffordshire | England | V Festival |
| 23 August 2014 | Southsea | England | Victorious Festival |
| 24 August 2014 | Hampshire | England | Carfest South |
| 29 August 2014 | Helsinki | Finland | Juhlaviikot Helsinki Festival |
| 6 September 2014 | Isle of Wight | England | Bestival |
Asia
| 24 October 2014 | Jakarta | Indonesia | Java Soundsfair |

=== Set list ===
1. "Birth of an Empire"
2. "Until the Stars Collide"
3. "Runaway Daydreamer"
4. "The Deer & the Wolf"
5. "Young Blood"
6. "When the Storm Has Blown Over"
7. "True Faith"
8. "Wrong Side of the Sun"
9. "When the Lost Don't Want to be Found"
10. "13 Little Dolls"
11. "Love Is a Camera"
12. "Cry to the Beat of the Band"
13. "Take Me Home"
14. "Lady (Hear Me Tonight)"
15. "Groovejet (If This Ain't Love)"
16. "Sing It Back"
17. "Heartbreak (Make Me a Dancer)"
18. "Murder on the Dancefloor"

== Track listing ==
All tracks are written by Sophie Ellis-Bextor and Ed Harcourt.

Wanderlust track listing
| No. | Title | Length |
|---|---|---|
| 1. | "Birth of an Empire" | 3:48 |
| 2. | "Until the Stars Collide" | 3:39 |
| 3. | "Runaway Daydreamer" | 4:00 |
| 4. | "The Deer & the Wolf" | 3:54 |
| 5. | "Young Blood" | 4:28 |
| 6. | "-Interlude-" | 2:23 |
| 7. | "13 Little Dolls" | 3:32 |
| 8. | "Wrong Side of the Sun" | 3:50 |
| 9. | "Love Is a Camera" | 4:13 |
| 10. | "Cry to the Beat of the Band" | 3:38 |
| 11. | "When the Storm Has Blown Over" | 3:31 |
| Total length: | | 38:56 |

Disc two – Wandermix (Repackaged edition)
| No. | Title | Length |
|---|---|---|
| 1. | "The Deer & the Wolf (Role Reversal)" | 3:43 |
| 2. | "Cry to the Beat of the Band (Break Up)" | 4:41 |
| 3. | "Wrong Side of the Sun (Phoenix Rising)" | 3:43 |
| 4. | "Runaway Daydreamer (Secret)" | 4:25 |
| 5. | "Young Blood (Kick It)" | 6:43 |
| 6. | "Wandermix" (continuous mix) | 23:16 |

== Personnel ==
Credits adapted from the liner notes of Wanderlust.

- Sophie Ellis-Bextor – vocals
- Seton Daunt – guitar
- Dirty Pretty Strings – strings (tracks 2, 5 and 8)
- Ed Harcourt – backing vocals, guitar, keyboards, piano, production, samples, synth (all tracks); arrangement, conducting (tracks 2, 5 and 8)
- Richard Jones – bass
- Amy Langley – cello (tracks 1, 2, 5 and 8)
- Gita Langley – violin (tracks 1–3, 5, 8 and 10)
- Rosie Langley – violin (tracks 2, 5 and 8)
- Arnulf Lindner – double bass (tracks 5 and 9)
- London Bulgarian Choir – choir (track 10)
- Michael Nash Associates – art direction
- Sophie Muller – photography
- Miles Showell – mastering
- Wallace Productions – management
- Phil Wilkinson – drums, percussion
- Polly Wiltshire – viola (tracks 2, 5 and 8)
- Richard Woodcraft – engineering, mixing

== Charts ==
Chart performance for Wanderlust
| Chart (2014) | Peak position |
|---|---|
| Belgian Albums Chart (Flanders) | 132 |
| Belgian Albums Chart (Wallonia) | 88 |
| Scottish Albums Chart | 9 |
| UK Albums Chart | 4 |
| UK Indie Albums Chart | 1 |

== Certifications ==
Certifications for Wanderlust
| Region | Certification | Certified units/sales |
|---|---|---|
| United Kingdom (BPI) | Silver | 60,000^{*} |
^{*} Sales figures based on certification alone.

== Release history ==
Release history and formats for Wanderlust
| Region | Date | Format(s) | Label | Ref. |
|---|---|---|---|---|
| Japan | 20 January 2014 | Digital download | EBGB's | |
| Mexico | 20 January 2014 | Digital download | EBGB's | |
| Spain | 20 January 2014 | Digital download | EBGB's | |
| United States | 20 January 2014 | Digital download | EBGB's | |
| Netherlands | 20 January 2014 | CD; digital download | EBGB's | |
| Sweden | 20 January 2014 | CD; digital download | EBGB's | |
| United Kingdom | 20 January 2014 | CD; digital download | EBGB's | |
| Japan | 22 January 2014 | CD | EBGB's; Modulor Japan | |
| Australia | 24 January 2014 | Digital download | EBGB's | |
| Germany | 24 January 2014 | CD; LP; digital download | EBGB's; Alive | |
| Italy | 24 January 2014 | Digital download | EBGB's | |
| France | 27 January 2014 | CD; digital download | EBGB's | |
| United Kingdom | 27 January 2014 | LP | EBGB's | |
| Australia | 3 February 2014 | LP | EBGB's | |
| Spain | 3 February 2014 | CD; LP | EBGB's | |
| Italy | 17 February 2014 | CD | EBGB's | |
| Australia | 21 February 2014 | CD | EBGB's | |
| United Kingdom (reissue) | 3 November 2014 | 2×CD; digital download; LP | EBGB's | |
