= Familia (Sophie Ellis-Bextor album) =

Studio album by Sophie Ellis-Bextor
- Released: 2 September 2016
- Studio: State of the Ark (Richmond, London)
- Genre: Indie pop; folk; disco; Latin pop
- Length: 45:25
- Label: EBGB's; Red Essential
- Producer: Ed Harcourt

Sophie Ellis-Bextor chronology
Wanderlust (2014)	Familia (2016)	The Song Diaries (2019)

Singles from Familia
- 1. "Come with Us" Released: 19 July 2016; 2. "Crystallise" Released: 10 October 2016; 3. "Wild Forever" Released: 13 January 2017; 4. "Death of Love" Released: 24 April 2017

Familia is the sixth studio album by English singer and songwriter Sophie Ellis-Bextor. The album was produced by Ed Harcourt, who also produced Ellis-Bextor's previous album, Wanderlust. It was released on 2 September 2016, by EBGB LLP and was critically acclaimed. It was preceded by disco-pop single "Come with Us", which was released on 19 July.

== Composition ==
Before work commenced on the album, Sophie visited Mexico, which she claimed influenced the mood of the record: "The last album I wrote with Ed Harcourt was a wintery kind of record... I think we already had a slightly human instinct to do the complete opposite... we had all of that fresh warmth in our minds."

"My new album Familia is the bolshier, more extrovert little sister to Wanderlust. It sees the Wanderlust girl move away from Eastern Europe to the warmer, sunnier climate of Latin America where she's swapped vodka for tequila."
— Ellis-Bextor speaking about the album.

== Singles ==
Four singles were released, but none of them saw the success of Ellis-Bextor's previous singles. The four songs were backed with music videos, all of them directed by long-time collaborator Sophie Muller.

The first single from the album, "Come with Us", was released to radio stations on 19 July 2016 and was sent to radio stations across the UK, joining West Hull FM's playlist on 1 August and BBC Radio 2 on 5 August. The single release was in August 2016; it came ahead of the album in September. The release was accompanied with a simple music video, shot during the photoshoot of the album. It consists of Sophie singing and dancing to the song wearing colourful make-up and dresses. The aesthetics of the video take explicit inspiration from Mexican culture imagery. The single received a digital release in some territories and included three additional dance mixes: the "F9 Radio Edit", "F9 Extended Disco Mix" and "F9 Mixshow Edit".

On 10 October the video for "Crystallise" was released on Vevo. The digital single release followed one month later. About the ballad, Ellis-Bextor said: "Everyone has the potential to fall in love and 'Crystallise' is about how easy it is to realize it if you let yourself. The ability to love has been there since the day you were born". In the video we can see her wearing a long black lace dress, wandering through the rooms and gardens of an old house in the countryside of England. Two remixes of the song were released: the "F9 Radio Edit" and "F9 Extended Mix".

The third single was "Wild Forever", a track that was highlighted by specialised reviewers as a stand-out. The video was released on YouTube on 13 January 2017 and the next day the single followed. A music video was filmed in Puerto Vallarta, Mexico. Part of it was filmed in Casa Kimberly, the residence of Elizabeth Taylor and Richard Burton in the sixties. Cinematography was undertaken by John Pérez. As with previous singles, "Wild Forever" was remixed by F9 into the "F9 Radio Edit" and "F9 Extended Mix".

"Death of Love" was the fourth and last single from the album, released on 24 April 2017. The accompanying video was shot in San Sebastián del Oeste, Mexico, and released earlier the same month. Instead of showing a glamorous and cosmopolitan Sophie, she is characterised as an inhabitant of a traditional Mexican town, shopping in the market, going to the church, walking in the streets and interacting with locals and eventually going to a bar to drink tequila and dance. The "Mariachi version" of the song and video was released less than a week after the official one. It was shot live at the La Barandilla tavern (that also appears at the end of the official version) with a group of uncredited mariachis.

== Critical reception ==
Professional ratings
Review scores
Source	Rating
AllMusic	3.5/5 stars
BBC Radio 2	4.5/5 stars
Classic Pop	3/5 stars
Idolator	4/5 stars
London Evening Standard	4/5 stars
Renowned for Sound	4/5 stars

Familia earned critical acclaim. John Aizlewood of the London Evening Standard said, "The pop singer brings ice-cold vocals and massive dance beats on her sixth LP. Sophie Ellis-Bextor's startling transformation from well-dressed pop poppet to mistress of imperious doom on 2014's Wanderlust didn't quite receive the acclaim it deserved."

Stephen Sears of Idolator said, "Ellis-Bextor returns to Harcourt with Familia (released September 2), an autumnal record, literally and figuratively. The crisp arrangements are organic, built on bass, guitar, piano and drums. But Harcourt and Ellis-Bextor reference a range of pop styles with details like the bubbling synths on 'The Death of Love' and the power chords that launch the album's galloping opener, 'Wild Forever'. The widescreen love song 'Crystallise', which ranks among Bextor's finest, has a lush chorus ribboned with violin" and praised Sophie for taking the risk with her Wanderlust album and this one saying, "What Familia ultimately recalls is the era of female singer-songwriters. Like predecessor Carly Simon, Ellis-Bextor knows that a lifelong career is built on a certain amount of risk-taking. 'Why be so ordinary? Why just conform?' she questions on 'Wild Forever'. Familia, released on her own record label, is the sound of an artist making the music she wants to make."

Sonia de Freitas of Renowned for Sound referred to the album as "highly enjoyable", saying that "Familia is a successful new release by Sophie Ellis-Bextor. In it, she showcases her skill in writing music in a variety of styles, while showing restraint in the balance of instrumentation (using acoustic, electronic and more traditional timbres). The Latin American influence on the music is evident without becoming a caricature, which can happen if the music is not well crafted by a meticulous musician. Throughout the album Ellis-Bextor displays her versatility as a singer; her distinctive voice delivers the lyrical content meaningfully and with purpose."

Classic Pop magazine wrote that "It's easy to forget Sophie Ellis-Bextor started out in the late-nineties as singer for the indie-rockers Theaudience. She has always been something of a chameleon, however, scoring a massive hit in 2000 with Spiller's immaculate disco-styled 'Groovejet' – which went on to become the decade's most played single – and notching up more electro-pop hits before drafting in Ed Harcourt for 2014's sophisticated but more low-key Wanderlust." The magazine favoured songs "Here Comes the Rapture", "Unrequited", "Hush Little Voices", "My Puppet Heart" and heralded "Wild Forever" and "Crystallise" as standout tracks. "The former – an effervescent, galloping pop tune, her voice at its sweetest as it rushes towards an ecstatic chorus – remains closest to the dancefloor-friendly Ellis-Bextor template with which we're most familiar. The latter – a lush, mid-paced slice of piano-led elegance – confirms that she remains one of our more refined pop stars. The audience may be forgotten, but Ellis-Bextor's audience has every reason to remain loyal."

== Track listing ==
The album was released in the following formats; Digital download on iTunes and CD, LP and mp3 download via Ellis-Bextor's official online store.

All tracks are written by and composed by Sophie Ellis-Bextor and Ed Harcourt. All tracks are produced by Harcourt.

Familia track listing
No.	Title	Length
1.	"Wild Forever"	4:21
2.	"Death of Love"	4:20
3.	"Crystallise"	3:31
4.	"Hush Little Voices"	4:14
5.	"Here Comes the Rapture"	4:06
6.	"Come with Us"	3:54
7.	"Cassandra"	3:38
8.	"My Puppet Heart"	4:05
9.	"Unrequited" (featuring Matthew Caws)	4:32
10.	"The Saddest Happiness"	4:14
11.	"Don't Shy Away"	4:30
Total length:		44:05

== Releases ==
- CD deluxe edition (book-bound)
- CD standard edition
- LP heavyweight vinyl (gatefold)
- LP heavyweight pink vinyl (exclusively released for HMV) (gatefold)
- iTunes digital album
- Mp3 digital album (for sale at Ellis-Bextor's website and for free via giftcard for those who bought the vinyl)
- The album was released in Japan on EBGB's EBGBCD-4J and Octave EBGBCD-4J

Signed copies of the vinyl and deluxe CD formats were made available via Ellis-Bextor's website.

== Charts ==
Chart (2016)	Peak position
Belgian Albums (Ultratop Flanders)	164
Scottish Albums (OCC)	12
UK Albums (OCC)	12
UK Independent Albums (OCC)	3
