= Wuh Oh =

Scottish musician

- Born: Peter Ferguson
- Genres: Pop; dance; electronic
- Years active: 2008–present
- Labels: Secret Songs; Soft Style
- Website: www.wuhoh.com

Peter Ferguson, known professionally as Wuh Oh, is a composer, producer, and performer from Bathgate, Scotland, now based in Glasgow. His music and his live act are notable for a hyper-modern musical style that has been described as "modernist avant-garde" and a performance-art element that features flamboyant custom-made outfits he creates with Glasgow School of Art.

== Stage name ==
Ferguson adopted the stage name "Wuh Oh" from a clip he used in one of his early tracks, of a kid saying the phrase. The name, he has said, ‘represents the magic that comes from the happy accidents, the music that I could never intentionally create.’

== Early life ==
Ferguson began making music at age 10 when his parents bought him a keyboard with primitive tracking and recording features. He gained his first significant public exposure as a chiptune producer, appearing at age 15 under the name Supersaiyans on Annie Mac's BBC Radio 1 show. He went on to study at the University of Glasgow where he graduated with a degree in music.

== Career ==
He released his debut EP Wuh Oh in November 2014. He gained further notice from his follow-up singles, including the track "Haircut", on Ryan Hemsworth's Canadian imprint Secret Songs. He has toured with artists including DJ Shadow and Orbital. On 10 January 2017 he performed live on Vic Galloway's BBC Introducing Sessions, followed later that year by appearances on the BBC stages at the TRNSMT and Electric Fields festivals.

In September 2019 Wuh Oh released his single "Ziggy" on his own Soft Style label. On the 27th of that month he released the single "Pretty Boy", and the following month Hudson Mohawke released a remix of the track.

Wuh Oh led off 2020 with the single "How Do You Do It?". His 2020 UK tour included appearances at Newcastle, London, Manchester, Cardiff, and Live at Leeds.

In 2022, Wuh Oh wrote and co-produced "Hypnotized", a song performed by Sophie Ellis-Bextor.
