= Young Blood (Sophie Ellis-Bextor song) =

Single by Sophie Ellis-Bextor

from the album Wanderlust
- Released: 21 November 2013
- Recorded: State of the Ark (Richmond, London)
- Genre: Chamber pop
- Length: 4:28
- Label: EBGB's
- Songwriters: Sophie Ellis-Bextor; Ed Harcourt
- Producer: Ed Harcourt

Sophie Ellis-Bextor singles chronology
"Beautiful" (2012)	"Young Blood" (2013)	"Runaway Daydreamer" (2014)

Music video
- "Sophie Ellis-Bextor - Young Blood (Official video)" on YouTube

"Young Blood" is a song by English recording artist Sophie Ellis-Bextor from her fifth studio album Wanderlust (2014). The song was released as the album's lead single on 21 November 2013. It was co-written by Ed Harcourt and Ellis-Bextor; the former also produced it. The song is a chamber pop piano ballad, which features instrumentation from subdued drums and various string instruments. In the track, Ellis-Bextor sings with restrain, incorporating a low register in the verses and hitting her highest note in the chorus. A demo version of the track was offered online in March 2013.

"Young Blood" received mostly positive reviews from music critics, who complimented Ellis-Bextor's vocals and the song's tenderness. The song became her first single to enter the UK Singles Chart since her 2011 single "Bittersweet". On its component UK Indie chart, the track peaked within the top five. Sophie Muller was commissioned to direct its video, which shows Ellis-Bextor on a pier and inside a living room. The song was performed on some television programmes in the United Kingdom.

== Composition ==
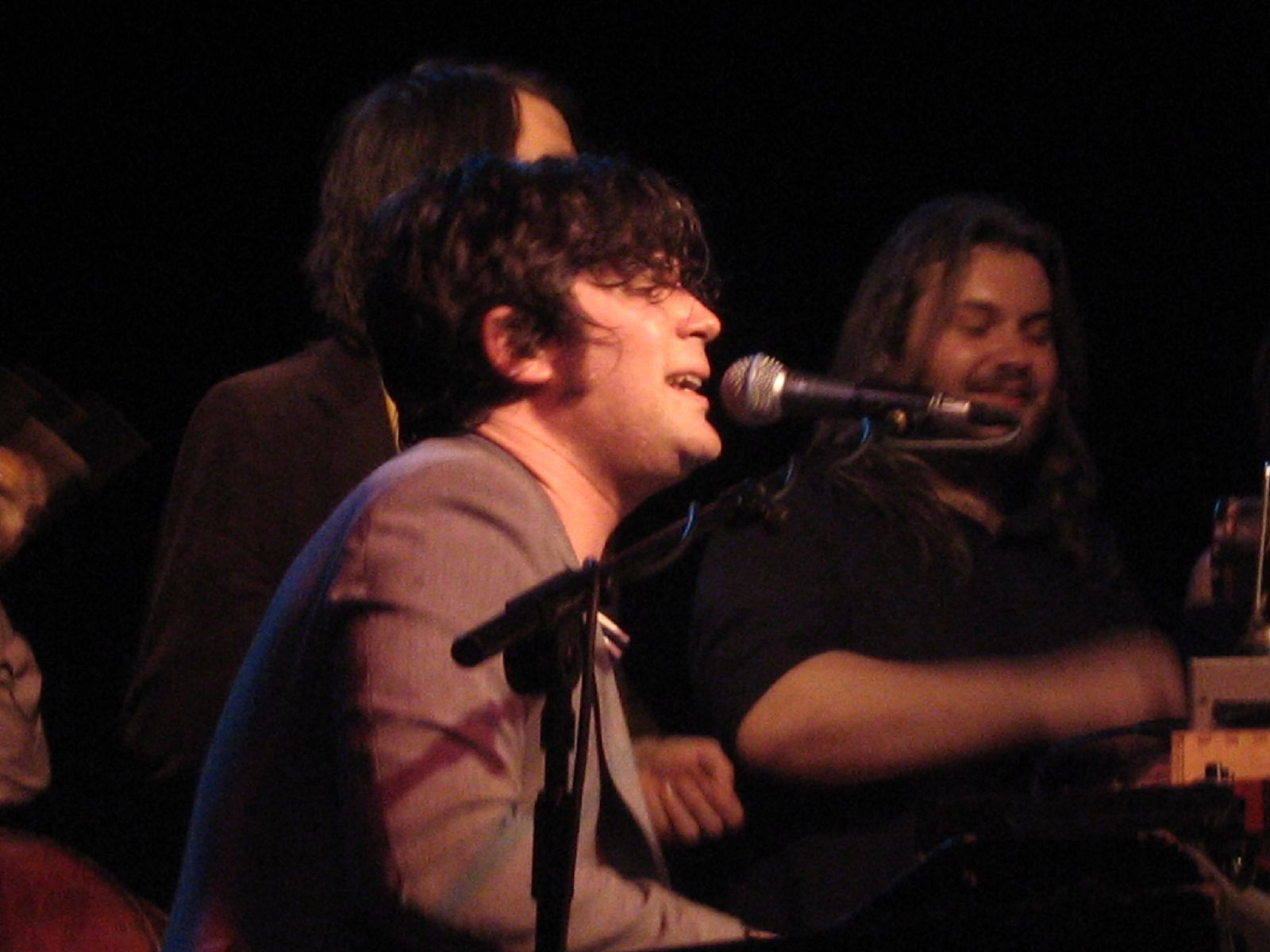
Musician Ed Harcourt produced and co-wrote the track.

As with the rest of Wanderlust, "Young Blood" was composed by the English musician Ed Harcourt, with additional songwriting from Ellis-Bextor. It was recorded at the State of the Ark studios, mixed and engineered by Richard Woodcruft, and mastered by Miles Showell. It is a chamber pop piano ballad, with a viola, a violin, muffled drums, a cello and a double bass.

According to the sheet music published by Universal Music, it is set in a tempo of 60 beats per minute. It is written in the key of F major, and its verses follow the chord progression B♭mai_{7}—F. The song begins with a gentle piano melody, transitioning into Ellis-Bextor's sung section. During the verses of the song, she sings in a low register, reaching her lowest note of F_{4}; conversely, in the chorus, her voice reaches C_{6} and trembles. Throughout the song, her vocals are restrained and incorporate the melisma technique. The bridge of the song features "choral harmonies". The song's lyrics are written in first and second-person narrative, following the common verse–chorus form. According to Ludovic Hunter-Tilney from Financial Times, the track discusses "the joys of growing old with one's spouse".

== Reception ==
For Time Out magazine, Clare Considine described "Young Blood" as a "delicate love song" and opined that the strings and piano melodies effectively complement Ellis-Bextor's vocals. Michael Cragg of The Guardian stated that the song's sonority "fits [Ellis-Bextor] like a glove", and also deemed its melody "gorgeous". James Gareth from Clash characterised the song as "sincerely beautiful", and Digital Spy's Robert Copsey agreed, calling it "doe-eyed" and "fantastically pretty". From Virgin Media, Matthew Horton called the track "heart-stinging", while Hermoine Hoby, writing for The Observer considered that the song is "surprisingly successfully" similar to the works of Adele. Sam Lansky of Idolator complimented the song for being "beautiful" and "timeless". Louise Bruton from The Irish Times wrote that Ellis-Bextor's "icy vocals forgive[d]" the "blunders" of Wanderlust, while musicOMH's Kate Bennett provided a polarized review for the song. Although she praised Ellis-Bextor's vocals, Bennett described the track as "heroine-gazing-forlornly-into-the-distance" due to its instrumentation. David Farrell, writing on behalf of PopMatters, commented that "Young Blood" was the best of the album and highlighted Ellis-Bextor's vocal performance.

The song only charted in the United Kingdom. Reaching number 34 on its singles chart, the song became Ellis-Bextor's first to enter the chart since "Bittersweet", which was released in 2010 and peaked at 25. "Young Blood" spent three weeks on the chart, and as of January 2014, it is her fifteenth best-selling song in the country. On the UK Indie chart, the track reached number 3.

== Release and promotion ==
A demo version of "Young Blood" was released on 27 March 2013, as a complimentary download on Ellis-Bextor's website. Selected as the lead single of Wanderlust, the song was released as a standalone digital download on 21 November of that year. A CD single of the track was sent to radio stations in that month, including the album version of it as well as a radio edit; the song was eventually playlisted by hot adult contemporary UK station BBC Radio 2. Ellis-Bextor revealed that she chose "Young Blood" as the first single from Wanderlust because she found it representative of the album's sound.

The official music video of "Young Blood" was filmed by Sophie Muller, and released on 25 November 2013. It mostly depicts Ellis-Bextor, dressed in a striped dress, lip-synching the song's lyrics, walking through an abandoned pier "in terrible weather". Those scenes are interspersed with clips of her sat on a red sofa, wearing a "buttoned up, Victorian-styled lace dress" inside a lounge room. Writing for Idolator, Mike Wass characterised the visual as "simple", noting that it is adequate for the song's tone. On 9 April 2014, Ellis-Bextor performed "Young Blood" on ITV's morning programme Daybreak; fifteen days later, she sang it on the first episode of the channel's Weekend, aired on 26 April 2014. She performed the song in an unplugged setting on ZDF Morgenmagazin, a programme of German channel ZDF, on 23 January 2014.

== Track listing ==
Promotional CD single

Details adapted from the liner notes of the "Young Blood" promotional CD single.

1. "Young Blood" (Radio edit) – 3:45
2. "Young Blood" – 4:28

Digital download

1. "Young Blood" – 4:28

== Credits and personnel ==
- Sophie Ellis-Bextor – lead vocals, songwriting
- Ed Harcourt – songwriting, production, background vocals, samples, synth, keyboards, piano
- Dirty Pretty Strings – strings
- Amy Lingley – cello
- Gita Langley – violin
- Rosie Langley – violin
- Arnulf Lindner – double bass
- Polly Wiltshire – viola
- Richard Woodcraft – engineering, mixing
- Miles Showell – mastering

== Weekly charts ==
Chart (2014)	Peak position
UK Singles (OCC)	34
UK Indie (OCC)	3
Scotland Singles (OCC)	45

== Release history ==
Country	Date	Format	Label	Ref.
United Kingdom	2013	Promotional CD single	EBGB's	
United Kingdom	21 November 2013	Digital download	EBGB's	
