= List of performances on Top of the Pops =

Most frequent performers on Top of the Pops

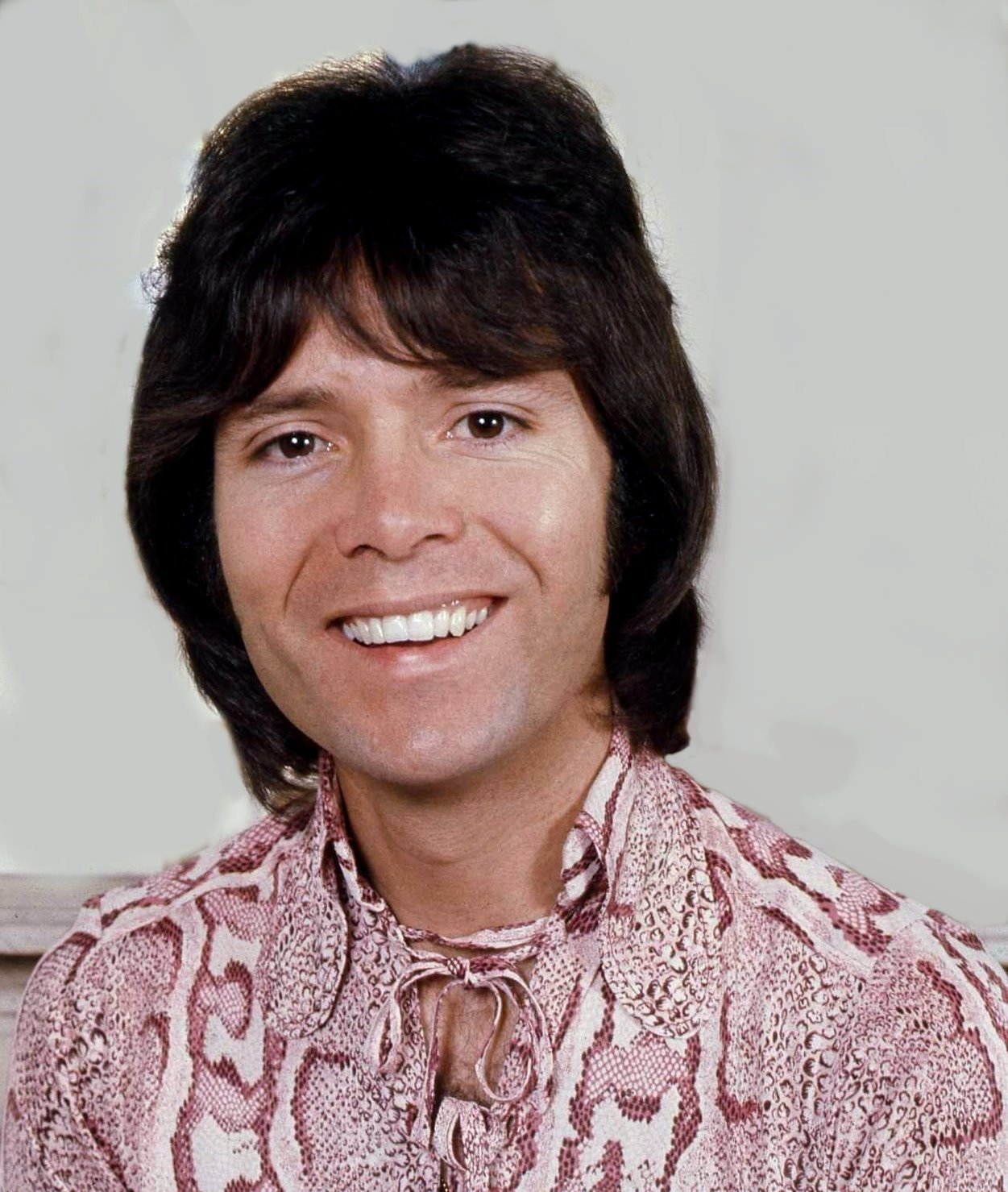
Solo artist: Cliff Richard

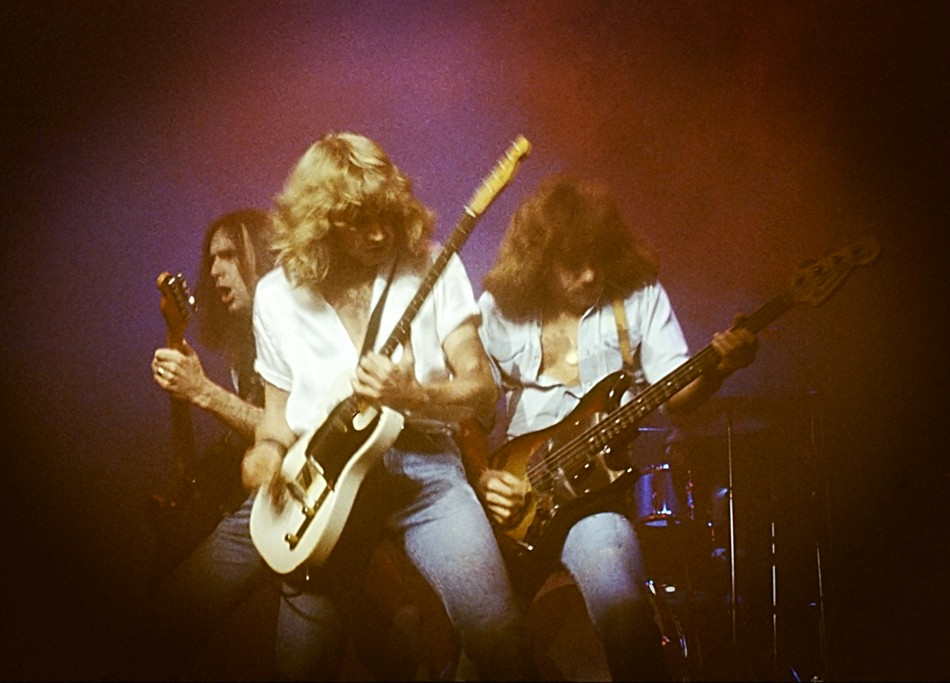
Group: Status Quo

This list of performances on Top of the Pops is a chronological account of popular songs performed by recording artists and musical ensembles on Top of the Pops, a weekly BBC One television programme that featured artists from the UK singles chart.

The BBC transmitted new installments of the programme weekly from January 1964 through July 2006, and later converted it into a radio programme. This list does not include performances from the radio programme.

== Contents ==
1960s: 1964 | 1965 | 1966 | 1967 | 1968 | 1969

1970s: 1970 | 1971 | 1972 | 1973 | 1974 | 1975 | 1976 | 1977 | 1978 | 1979

1980s: 1980 | 1981 | 1982 | 1983 | 1984 | 1985 | 1986 | 1987 | 1988 | 1989

1990s: 1990 | 1991 | 1992 | 1993 | 1994 | 1995 | 1996 | 1997 | 1998 | 1999

2000s: 2000 | 2001 | 2002 | 2003 | 2004 | 2005 | 2006 | 2007 | 2008

2010s: 2018 | 2019

2020s: 2020

== 1964 ==
- Dusty Springfield – "I Only Want to Be with You", "I Just Don't Know What to Do with Myself", "Losing You"
- The Hollies – "Stay", "Just One Look", "Here I Go Again", "We're Through"
- The Swinging Blue Jeans – "Hippy Hippy Shake", "Good Golly Miss Molly", "You're No Good", "It Isn't There"
- The Dave Clark Five – "Glad All Over", "Bits and Pieces", "Can't You See That She's Mine", "Anyway You Want It"
- Adam Faith – "We Are In Love", "Message to Martha"
- Gerry and the Pacemakers – "I'm the One", "Don't Let the Sun Catch You Crying", "It's Gonna Be Alright"
- The Fourmost – "I'm in Love", "A Little Loving", "Baby I Need Your Loving"
- Billy Fury – "Do You Really Love Me Too", "I Will", "It's Only Make Believe"
- The Merseybeats – "I Think of You", "Don't Turn Around", "Wishin' and Hopin'"
- The Searchers – "Needles and Pins", "Don't Throw Your Love Away", "Some Day We're Gonna Love Again", "When You Walk in the Room", "What Have They Done to the Rain"
- Manfred Mann – "5-4-3-2-1", "Hubble Bubble", "Do Wah Diddy Diddy", "Sha La La"
- The Bachelors – "Diane", "I Believe", "Ramona", "I Wouldn't Trade You for the World", "No Arms Can Ever Hold You"
- The Rolling Stones – "I Wanna Be Your Man", "You Better Move On", "Not Fade Away", "If You Need Me", "I Just Want to Make Love to You", "It's All Over Now"
- Cilla Black – "Anyone Who Had a Heart", "You're My World", "It's for You"
- Cliff Richard – "I'm the Lonely One"
- Brian Poole & the Tremeloes – "Candy Man", "Someone, Someone"
- Eden Kane – "Boys Cry"
- Freddie and the Dreamers – "You Were Made for Me", "Over You", "I Love You Baby", "I Understand (Just How You Feel)"
- Billy J. Kramer and the Dakotas – "Little Children", "From a Window"
- Kathy Kirby – "Let Me Go, Lover!", "You're the One"
- Gene Pitney – "That Girl Belongs to Yesterday", "I'm Gonna Be Strong"
- Peter and Gordon – "A World Without Love", "Nobody I Know"
- The Applejacks – "Tell Me When", "Like Dreamers Do", "Three Little Words"
- The Beatles – "Can't Buy Me Love", "You Can't Do That", "A Hard Day's Night", "Long Tall Sally", "Things We Said Today", "She's a Woman"
- Millie Small – "My Boy Lollipop"
- The Four Pennies – "Juliet", "I Found Out the Hard Way", "Black Girl"
- The Mojos – "Everything's Alright"
- The Shadows – "The Rise and Fall of Flingel Bunt"
- Lulu – "Shout"
- Petula Clark – "Downtown"
- P. J. Proby – "Hold Me", "Together", "Somewhere"
- John Lee Hooker – "Dimples"
- The Animals – "The House of the Rising Sun"
- The Barron Knights – "Call Up the Groups"
- The Nashville Teens – "Tobacco Road", "Google Eye"
- The Honeycombs – "Have I the Right?"
- Dave Berry – "The Crying Game"
- Dionne Warwick – "You'll Never Get to Heaven (If You Break My Heart)
- The Kinks – "You Really Got Me", "All Day and All of the Night"
- Brenda Lee – "Is It True"
- The Zombies – "She's Not There"
- Herman's Hermits – "I'm Into Something Good", "Show Me Girl"
- Marianne Faithfull – "As Tears Go By"
- The Newbeats – "Bread and Butter"
- Matt Monro – "Walk Away"
- Sandie Shaw – "(There's) Always Something There to Remind Me", "Girl Don't Come"
- The Supremes – "Where Did Our Love Go", "Baby Love"
- Wayne Fontana and the Mindbenders – "Um, Um, Um, Um, Um, Um"
- The Rockin' Berries – "He's in Town"
- The Shangri-Las – "Remember (Walking in the Sand)"
- The Pretty Things – "Don't Bring Me Down"
- Val Doonican – "Walk Tall"
- Georgie Fame and the Blue Flames – "Yeh, Yeh"
- Twinkle – "Terry"
- The Moody Blues – "Go Now"
- Julie Rogers – "The Wedding"
- Roy Orbison – "Oh, Pretty Woman"

== 1965 ==
- Adam Faith – "Message to Martha", "Stop Feeling Sorry for Yourself", "Someone's Taken Maria Away"
- Gene Pitney – "I'm Gonna Be Strong", "I Must Be Seeing Things", "Looking Through the Eyes of Love", "Princess In Rags"
- Georgie Fame and the Blue Flames – "Yeh, Yeh", "In the Meantime"
- Gerry and the Pacemakers – "Ferry Cross the Mersey", "I'll Be There"
- Sounds Orchestral – "Cast Your Fate to the Wind"
- Sandie Shaw – "Girl Don't Come", "I'll Stop at Nothing", "Long Live Love", "Message Understood", "How Can You Tell"
- The Searchers – "What Have They Done to the Rain", "Goodbye My Love", "Bumble Bee", "He's Got No Love", "When I Get Home"
- Them – "Baby, Please Don't Go", "Here Comes the Night"
- Billy Fury – "I'm Lost Without You", "In Thoughts of You"
- Cilla Black – "You've Lost That Lovin' Feelin'", "I've Been Wrong Before"
- Twinkle – "Terry", "Golden Lights"
- Brian Poole & the Tremeloes – "Three Bells", "I Want Candy", "Good Lovin'"
- Del Shannon – "Keep Searchin' (We'll Follow the Sun)"
- Manfred Mann – "Come Tomorrow", "Oh No Not My Baby", "The One in the Middle", "If You Gotta Go, Go Now"
- The Kinks – "Tired of Waiting for You", "Everybody's Gonna Be Happy", "Set Me Free", "See My Friends", "Till the End of the Day"
- The Moody Blues – "Go Now", "From the Bottom of My Heart (I Love You)"
- Val Doonican – "The Special Years", "I'm Gonna Get There Somehow"
- The Seekers – "I'll Never Find Another You", "A World of Our Own", "The Carnival Is Over"
- The Righteous Brothers – "You've Lost That Lovin' Feelin'"
- The Animals – "Don't Let Me Be Misunderstood", "Bring It On Home to Me", "We Gotta Get Out of This Place", "It's My Life"
- Wayne Fontana and The Mindbenders – "Game of Love"
- Herman's Hermits – "Silhouettes", "Wonderful World", "Just a Little Bit Better", "A Must to Avoid"
- The Hollies – "Yes I Will", "I'm Alive", "Look Through Any Window", "If I Needed Someone"
- Tom Jones – "It's Not Unusual", "With These Hands"
- Roy Orbison – "Goodnight"
- Kathy Kirby – "I Belong"
- Marianne Faithfull – "Come and Stay with Me", "This Little Bird", "Summer Nights", "Yesterday"
- The Pretty Things – "Honey I Need"
- The Shadows – "Mary Anne", "Don't Make My Baby Blue", "War Lord"
- Petula Clark – "I Know a Place", "Round Every Corner"
- The Rolling Stones – "The Last Time", "It's Alright", "The Spider and the Fly", "(I Can't Get No) Satisfaction", "Cry to Me", "Get Off of My Cloud"
- The Who – "I Can't Explain", "Anyway, Anyhow, Anywhere", "My Generation"
- The Yardbirds – "For Your Love", "Heart Full of Soul", "Still I'm Sad"
- Unit 4 + 2 – "Concrete and Clay", "You've Never Been In Love Like This Before"
- Cliff Richard – "The Minute You're Gone", "The Time in Between", "Wind Me Up (Let Me Go)"
- Donovan – "Catch the Wind", "Colours", "Universal Soldier"
- Freddie and the Dreamers – "A Little You"
- Dave Berry – "Little Things"
- Roger Miller – "King of the Road"
- The Bachelors – "True Love for Ever More", "Marie"
- The Barron Knights – "Pop Go the Workers", "Merry Gentle Pops"
- Peter and Gordon – "True Love Ways", "To Know You (Is to Love You)", "Baby I'm Yours"
- The Beatles – "Ticket to Ride", "Yes It Is", "We Can Work It Out", "Day Tripper"
- Lulu – "Sastisfied", "Leave a Little Love", "Try to Understand"
- Chubby Checker – "At the Discothèque", "Everything's Wrong"
- Jackie Trent – "Where Are You Now (My Love)"
- The Honeycombs – "Something Better Beginning", "That's the Way"
- Françoise Hardy – "All Over the World", "So Many Friends"
- The Rockin' Berries – "Poor Man's Son"
- The Dave Clark Five – "Come Home", "Catch Us If You Can"
- The Everly Brothers – "The Price of Love", "Love Is Strange"
- The Walker Brothers – "Love Her", "Make It Easy on Yourself", "My Ship is Coming In"
- Burt Bacharach – "Trains and Boats and Planes"
- Dusty Springfield – "In the Middle of Nowhere", "Some of Your Lovin'"
- Joan Baez – "There But for Fortune"
- Peter Cook & Dudley Moore – "Goodbye-ee"
- The Fortunes – "You've Got Your Troubles", "Here It Comes Again"
- Vikki Carr – "Tell Her of Our Love"
- Jonathan King – "Everyone's Gone to the Moon"
- Sue Thompson – "It's Breakup Time"
- Horst Jankowski – "A Walk in the Black Forest"
- The Byrds – "All I Really Want to Do"
- The Fourmost – "Everything in the Garden"
- Sonny & Cher – "I Got You Babe", "Laugh At Me"
- Ken Dodd – "Tears"
- Cher – "All I Really Want to Do"
- Sam the Sham – "Ju Ju Hand"
- The Sorrows – "Take a Heart"
- Small Faces – "Whatcha Gonna Do About It"
- The Silkie – "You've Got to Hide Your Love Away"
- The Zombies – "Whenever You're Ready"
- Billy Joe Royal – "Down in the Boondocks"
- Peter, Paul and Mary – "Early Morning Rain"
- P.J. Proby – "That Means a Lot", "Maria", "Somewhere"
- The Supremes – "Nothing but Heartaches"
- Barry McGuire – "Eve of Destruction"
- Hedgehoppers Anonymous – "It's Good News Week"
- Matt Monro – "Yesterday"n
- Chris Andrews – "Yesterday Man"
- The Swinging Blue Jeans – "Crazy 'Bout My Baby", "Hippy Hippy Shake"
- Billy J. Kramer and The Dakotas – "Neon City"
- Wilson Pickett – "Don't Fight It"
- Sir Douglas Quintet – "The Story of John Hardy"
- Fontella Bass – "Rescue Me"
- The Toys – "A Lover's Concerto"
- The Spencer Davis Group – "Keep On Running"
- Peter Sellers – "A Hard Day's Night"

== 1966 ==
- David and Jonathan – "Michelle", "Lovers of the World Unite"
- Fontella Bass – "Recovery"
- Herman's Hermits – "A Must to Avoid", "You Won't Be Leaving", "This Door Swings Both Ways", "No Milk Today"
- Ken Dodd – "The River", "Promises"
- The Kinks – "Till the End of the Day", "Dedicated Follower of Fashion", "Sunny Afternoon"
- The Jimi Hendrix Experience – "Hey Joe"
- The Spencer Davis Group – "Keep On Running", "Somebody Help Me", "When I Come Home", "Gimme Some Lovin'"
- Tom Jones – "Thunderball", "Stop Breaking My Heart", "Not Responsible", "Green Green Grass of Home"
- Len Barry – "Like a Baby"
- The Nashville Teens – "The Hard Way"
- The Overlanders – "Michelle"
- The Walker Brothers – "My Ship is Coming In", "The Sun Ain't Gonna Shine Anymore", "(Baby) You Don't Have to Tell Me", "Another Tear Falls"
- Cilla Black – "Love's Just a Broken Heart", "Alfie", "Don't Answer Me", "A Fool Am I"
- Crispian St. Peters – "You Were on My Mind", "The Pied Piper"
- Stevie Wonder – "Uptight (Everything's Alright)"
- Dusty Springfield – "Little by Little", "You Don't Have to Say You Love Me", "Going Back", "All I See Is You"
- Pinkerton's Assorted Colours – "Mirror Mirror", "Don't Stop Loving Me Baby", "Magic Rocking Horse"
- Sandie Shaw – "Tomorrow", "Nothing Comes Easy", "Run", "Think Sometimes About Me"
- The Mindbenders – "A Groovy Kind of Love", "Ashes to Ashes"
- Eddy Arnold – "Make the World Go Away", "I Want to Go with You"
- Petula Clark – "My Love", "I Couldn't Live Without Your Love"
- The Rolling Stones – "As Tears Go By", "19th Nervous Breakdown", "Mother's Little Helper", "Lady Jane", "Paint It, Black", "Have You Seen Your Mother, Baby, Standing in the Shadow?"
- Gene Pitney – "Backstage", "Nobody Needs Your Love"
- The Animals – "Inside-Looking Out", "Don't Bring Me Down"
- Eric Burdon – "Help Me Girl"
- Lulu – "Call Me"
- Small Faces – "Sha-La-La-La-Lee", "Hey Girl", "All or Nothing", "My Mind's Eye"
- The Hollies – "I Can't Let Go", "Bus Stop", "Stop Stop Stop"
- The Fortunes – "The Golden Ring", "Is It Really Worth Your While"
- The Shadows – "I Met a Girl", "A Place in the Sun", "The Dreams I Dream"
- The Bachelors – "The Sounds of Silence"
- The Yardbirds – "Shapes of Things", "Over Under Sideways Down", "Happenings Ten Years Time Ago"
- Val Doonican – "Elusive Butterfly", "What Would I Be"
- Bob Lind – "Elusive Butterfly"
- Dave Dee, Dozy, Beaky, Mick & Tich – "Hold Tight!", "Hideaway", "Bend It", "Save Me"
- Roy Orbison – "Twinkle Toes"
- The Who – "Substitute", "I'm a Boy"
- The Seekers – "Someday One Day", "Walk with Me", "Morningtown Ride"
- The Alan Price Set – "I Put a Spell on You", "Hi-Lili, Hi-Lo"
- The Searchers – "Take It or Leave It", "Have You Ever Loved Somebody"
- Manfred Mann – "Pretty Flamingo", "Just Like a Woman", "Semi-Detached, Suburban Mr James"
- The Lovin' Spoonful – "Daydream"
- Nancy Sinatra – "How Does That Grab You, Darlin'?"
- Trini Lopez – "I'm Coming Home Cindy"
- Neil Christian – "That's Nice"
- Peter Cook and Dudley Moore – "Bo Dudley"
- The Merseys – "Sorrow"
- The Troggs – "Wild Thing", "With a Girl Like You", "I Can't Control Myself"
- Chris Andrews – "What'cha Gonna Do Now", "Stop That Girl"
- Wayne Fontana – "Come On Home"
- The Beatles – "Paperback Writer", "Rain"
- Georgie Fame and the Blue Flames – "Get Away", "Sunny"
- Chris Farlowe – "Out of Time"
- Los Bravos – "Black Is Black", "I Don't Care"
- Simon & Garfunkel – "I Am a Rock"
- Dave Berry – "Mama"
- Twice as Much – "Sittin' on a Fence"
- Billy Fury – "Give Me Your Word"
- Sonny & Cher – "Little Man"
- The New Vaudeville Band – "Winchester Cathedral"
- Peter and Gordon – "Lady Godiva"
- Cat Stevens – "I Love My Dog"
- Robert Parker – "Happy Feet"
- Lee Dorsey – "Holy Cow"
- The Dave Clark Five – "Nineteen Days"
- Paul Anka – "Poor Old World"
- Four Tops – "Reach Out I'll Be There"
- Cliff Richard – "Time Drags By"
- Bobby Darin – "If I Were a Carpenter"
- Little Richard – "I Need Love"
- The Easybeats – "Friday on My Mind"
- Samantha Juste – "No One Needs My Love Today"
- Donovan – "Sunshine Superman"
- Bobby Hebb – "A Satisfied Mind"
- The Rascals – "Too Many Fish in the Sea"
- Paul Jones – "High Time"

== 1967 ==
- Donovan – "Sunshine Superman", "Mellow Yellow"
- Paul Jones – "I've Been a Bad, Bad Boy", "Thinkin' Ain't for Me"
- Sandie Shaw – "I Don't Need Anything", "You've Not Changed", "Puppet on a String", "Tonight in Tokyo"
- The Easybeats – "Friday on My Mind"
- Four Tops – "Standing in the Shadows of Love"
- The Kinks – "Dead End Street", "Waterloo Sunset", "Autumn Almanac"
- The Troggs – "Any Way That You Want Me", "Give It to Me", "Night of the Long Grass", "Love Is All Around"
- Tom Jones – "Green Green Grass of Home", "Detroit City", "Funny Familiar Forgotten Feelings", "I'll Never Fall in Love Again", "I'm Coming Home"
- The Who – "Happy Jack", "Pictures of Lily", "I Can See for Miles"
- The Move – "Night of Fear", "Flowers in the Rain", "I Can Hear the Grass Grow"
- Rita Pavone – "You Only You"
- Cream – "I Feel Free", "Strange Brew"
- Cat Stevens – "Matthew and Son", "I'm Gonna Get Me a Gun", "A Bad Night"
- Adam Faith – "What More Can Anyone Do"
- Georgie Fame – "Sitting in the Park", "Because I Love You", "Try My World"
- Wayne Fontana – "Pamela Pamela"
- The Tremeloes – "Here Comes My Baby", "Silence Is Golden", "Even the Bad Times Are Good", "Be Mine"
- The Searchers – "Popcorn Double Feature"
- The Jimi Hendrix Experience – "Hey Joe", "Purple Haze", "The Wind Cries Mary", "Burning of the Midnight Lamp"
- The New Vaudeville Band – "Peek-A-Boo", "Finchley Central", "Green Street Green"
- The Rolling Stones – "Let's Spend the Night Together", "Ruby Tuesday", "2000 Light Years from Home"
- Jonathan King – "Seagulls"
- Chris Farlowe – "My Way of Giving"
- Petula Clark – "This Is My Song"
- Herman's Hermits – "There's a Kind of Hush"
- Gene Pitney – "(In the) Cold Light of Day", "Something's Gotten Hold of My Heart"
- Engelbert Humperdinck – "Release Me", "The Last Waltz", "There Goes My Everything"
- The Hollies – "On a Carousel", "King Midas In Reverse", "Carrie-Anne"
- P.J. Proby – "Nikky Hoeky"
- Sandy Posey – "Single Girl"
- Vince Hill – "Edelweiss", "Roses of Picardy"
- Dusty Springfield – "I'll Try Anything", "Give Me Time"
- Val Doonican – "Memories Are Made of This", "Two Streets", "If The Whole World Stopped Loving"
- Dave Dee, Dozy, Beaky, Mick & Tich – "Touch Me Touch Me", "Okay", "Zabadak!"
- Roy Orbison – "So Good"
- The Nashville Teens – "I'm Coming Home"
- Keith – "Tell It to My Face"
- The Alan Price Set – "Simon Smith and His Amazing Dancing Bear", "The House That Jack Built", "Shame"
- Lee Dorsey – "Rain Rain Go Away"
- Harry Secombe – "This Is My Song"
- Cliff Richard – "It's All Over", "I'll Come Running", "The Day I Met Marie", "All My Love"
- The Dave Clark Five – "You Got What It Takes", "Everybody Knows"
- The Dubliners – "The Black Velvet Band", "Seven Drunken Nights"
- Traffic – "Hole in My Shoe", "Here We Go Round the Mulberry Bush"
- The Flower Pot Men – "Let's Go to San Francisco"
- Small Faces – "Just Passing", "Here Come the Nice", "Itchycoo Park"
- Whistling Jack Smith – "I Was Kaiser Bill's Batman"
- Otis Redding – "Day Tripper"
- Manfred Mann – "Ha! Ha! Said the Clown", "So Long Dad"
- The Four Tops – "Bernadette"
- Lulu – "The Boat That I Row", "Let's Pretend", "Love Loves to Love Love"
- Rolf Harris – "Fijian Girl"
- David and Jonathan – ""
- P. P. Arnold – "The First Cut Is the Deepest"
- Jeff Beck – "Hi Ho Silver Lining"
- Neil Diamond – "Girl, You'll Be a Woman Soon"
- Chris Farlowe – "Yesterday's Papers"
- Bee Gees – "New York Mining Disaster 1941", "Massachusetts", "World"
- Procol Harum – "A Whiter Shade of Pale", "Homburg"
- Cilla Black – "What Good Am I", "I Only Live to Love You"
- The Turtles – "She'd Rather Be with Me"
- Judith Durham – "The Olive Tree"
- Vikki Carr – "It Must Be Him"
- Pink Floyd – "See Emily Play"
- Dave Davies – "Death of a Clown"
- Anita Harris – "Just Loving You"
- Amen Corner – "Gin House Blues"
- The Beatles – "All You Need Is Love"
- The New Christy Minstrels – "I'll Coat Your Mind with Honey"
- The Animals – "Good Times", "San Franciscan Nights"
- Keith West – "Excerpt from A Teenage Opera"
- Frankie Vaughan – "There Must Be a Way"
- The Herd – "From the Underworld"
- The Barron Knights – "Here Come the Bees"
- The Seekers – "When Will the Good Apples Fall"
- Stevie Wonder – "I'm Wondering"
- The Foundations – "Baby Now That I've Found You"
- Long John Baldry – "Let the Heartaches Begin"
- Simon Dupree and the Big Sound – "Kites"
- Des O'Connor – "Careless Hands"

== 1968 ==
- The Alan Bown Set – "We Can Help You"
- Amen Corner – "Bend Me, Shape Me"
- Alan Price Set – "Don't Stop the Carnival"
- Brian Auger, Julie Driscoll, & The Trinity – "This Wheel's on Fire"
- Cilla Black – "Step Inside Love", "Where is Tomorrow?"
- The Crazy World of Arthur Brown – "Fire"
- Dave Dee, Dozy, Beaky, Mick & Tich – "The Legend of Xanadu"
- The Equals – "Baby Come Back"
- The Foundations – "Back on My Feet Again"
- Herman's Hermits – "I Can Take or Leave Your Loving"
- Mary Hopkin – "Those Were the Days"
- Tom Jones – "Delilah"
- Lulu – "Me, The Peaceful Heart", "Boy", "I'm a Tiger"
- Manfred Mann – "Mighty Quinn", "My Name Is Jack"
- Massiel – "He Gives Me Love"
- The Move – "Fire Brigade"
- Don Partridge – "Rosie", "Blue Eyes"
- The Beach Boys – "Do It Again"
- Cliff Richard – "Congratulations", "I'll Love You Forever Today", "Marianne"
- Status Quo – "Pictures of Matchstick Men"
- The Doors – "Hello, I Love You"
- The Kinks – "Wonderboy", "Days"
- Brenton Wood – "Gimme Little Sign"
- Small Faces – "Lazy Sunday"
- The Herd – "I Don't Want Our Loving to Die"
- Love Affair – "Everlasting Love", "My Rainbow Valley"

== 1969 ==
- David Bowie – "Space Oddity"
- Cilla Black – "Surround Yourself with Sorrow", "Conversations", "If I Thought You'd Ever Change Your Mind"
- Joe Dolan – "Make Me an Island"
- The Hollies – "Sorry Suzanne"
- Mary Hopkin – "Goodbye"
- The Kinks – "Days"
- Lulu – "Boom Bang-a-Bang", "Oh Me Oh My (I'm a Fool for You Baby)"
- Don Partridge – "Breakfast on Pluto"
- Cliff Richard – "Good Times (Better Times)", "Big Ship", "Throw Down a Line" (with Hank Marvin), "With the Eyes of a Child"
- Clodagh Rodgers – "Come Back and Shake Me", "Goodnight Midnight"
- The Rolling Stones – "Honky Tonk Women"
- Peter Sarstedt – "Where Do You Go To (My Lovely)?"
- Sandie Shaw – "Monsieur Dupont", "Think It All Over"
- Fleetwood Mac- "Albatross"

== 1970 ==
- Black Sabbath – "Paranoid"
- Badfinger – "Come and Get It"
- Blodwyn Pig – "Same Old Story"
- Deep Purple – "Black Night"
- Dana – "All Kinds Of Everything", "I Will Follow You"
- Edison Lighthouse – "Love Grows (Where My Rosemary Goes)
- Aretha Franklin – "I Say a Little Prayer"
- Kenny Rogers and The First Edition – "Something's Burning"
- Free – "All Right Now"
- Mary Hopkin – "Temma Harbour", "Knock, Knock Who's There?", "Think About Your Children"
- The Jackson 5 – "I Want You Back"
- Jethro Tull – "The Witch's Promise"
- John Lennon – "Instant Karma!"
- King Crimson – "Cat Food"
- The Kinks – "Lola", "Apeman"
- Lulu – "You've Got to Believe in Love"
- The Rattles – "The Witch"
- Cliff Richard – "The Joy of Living" (with Hank Marvin), "Goodbye Sam, Hello Samantha", "I Ain't Got Time Anymore"
- Clodagh Rodgers – "Biljo", "Everybody Go Home (The Party Is Over)", "Tangerines, Tangerines"
- Shocking Blue – "Venus"
- Vanity Fare – "Hitchin' a Ride"
- White Plains – "My Baby Loves Lovin'"
- The Who – "The Seeker"
- Pickettywitch – "That Same Old Feeling", "It's Like a Sad Old Kinda Movie", "Baby I Won't Let You Down"
- T. Rex – "Ride a White Swan"
- Elton John – "Border Song"
- The Beach Boys – "Tears in the Morning"
- Arrival – "Friends"
- Richard Barnes – "Go North"
- The Palace Guard – "Monster Mash"

== 1971 ==
- Lynn Anderson – "Rose Garden"
- Atomic Rooster – "Devil's Answer"
- Badfinger – "No Matter What"
- Benny Hill – "Ernie (The Fastest Milkman in the West)"
- Cilla Black – "Something Tells Me (Something's Gonna Happen Tonight)"
- Dana – "Who Put the Lights Out?"
- Deep Purple – "Black Night"
- The Delfonics – "La-La (Means I Love You)"
- Clive Dunn – "Grandad"
- Family – "In My Own Time"
- Greyhound – "Black and White"
- The Hollies – "Hey Willy"
- The Kinks – "Apeman"
- Jason & Gerome – Santa Monica Sunshine
- Elton John – "Your Song", "Tiny Dancer"
- Olivia Newton-John – "Banks of the Ohio"
- The Jackson 5 – "Mama's Pearl"
- John Kongos – "He's Gonna Step On You Again"
- Lulu – "Everybody's Got to Clap"
- Tami Lynn – "I'm Gonna Run Away from You"
- Medicine Head – "(And The) Pictures in the Sky"
- Middle of the Road – "Soley Soley", "Chirpy Chirpy Cheep Cheep"
- The Mixtures – "The Pushbike Song"
- Peter Noone – "Oh! You Pretty Things"
- The New Seekers – "I'd Like to Teach the World to Sing"
- Gilbert O'Sullivan – "No Matter How I Try"
- Cliff Richard – "Sunny Honey Girl", "Flying Machine", "Sing a Song of Freedom"
- Clodagh Rodgers – "Jack in the Box", "Lady Love Bug"
- The Rolling Stones – "Brown Sugar", "Bitch", "Wild Horses"
- Labi Siffre – "It Must Be Love"
- Rod Stewart – "Maggie May"
- Séverine – "Un banc, un arbre, une rue"
- Slade – "Get Down and Get with It", "Coz I Luv You"
- Strawbs – "The Hangman and the Papist"
- The Sweet – "Co-Co", "Funny, Funny"
- Tin Tin – "Is That the Way?"
- T. Rex – "Hot Love", "Get It On", "Jeepster"
- The Who – "Won't Get Fooled Again"
- Yes – "Starship Trooper", "Yours Is No Disgrace"

== 1972 ==
- Bee Gees – "My World"
- Chicory Tip – "Son of My Father"
- Chuck Berry – "My Ding-A-Ling"
- Cilla Black – "The World I Wish for You", "You You You"
- David Bowie – "Starman"
- Alice Cooper – "School's Out", "Elected"
- Dana – "Crossword Puzzle"
- Lynsey de Paul – "Sugar Me", "Getting a Drag"
- The Kinks – "Supersonic Rocket Ship"
- Roberta Flack – "The First Time Ever I Saw Your Face"
- Gary Glitter – "Rock & Roll Part 2"
- Hawkwind – "Silver Machine"
- Michael Jackson & The Jackson 5 – "Rockin' Robin", "Lookin' Through the Windows"
- Elton John – "Daniel", "Rocket Man", "Crocodile Rock", "Honky Cat"
- Gladys Knight & The Pips – "Help Me Make It Through the Night"
- Vicky Leandros – "Come What May"
- Lieutenant Pigeon – "Mouldy Old Dough"
- Don McLean – "American Pie"
- The Move – "California Man"
- The New Seekers – "I'd Like to Teach the World to Sing", "Beg, Steal or Borrow", "Circle", "Come Softly to Me"
- Donny Osmond – "Puppy Love"
- The Osmonds – "Crazy Horses"
- Gilbert O'Sullivan – "Clair"
- Cliff Richard – "Jesus", "Living in Harmony", "A Brand New Song"
- Clodagh Rodgers – "You Are My Music"
- Roxy Music – "Virginia Plain"
- Slade – "Look Wot You Dun", "Take Me Bak 'Ome", "Mama Weer All Crazee Now", "Gudbuy T'Jane"
- Strawbs – "Lay Down"
- The Sweet – "Poppa Joe", "Little Willy", "Wig-Wam Bam"
- T. Rex – "Telegram Sam", "Metal Guru", "Children of the Revolution", "Solid Gold Easy Action"
- Mary Wells – "My Guy"
- Olivia Newton-John – "Banks of the Ohio"
- The Beach Boys – "You Need a Mess of Help to Stand Alone"

== 1973 ==
- Anne-Marie David – "Wonderful Dream"
- Ayshea Brough – "Farewell"
- Barry Blue – "Dancin' (on a Saturday Night)", "Do You Wanna Dance"
- David Bowie – "Changes", "The Jean Genie"
- Tony Christie – "Avenues and Alleyways"
- Perry Como – "For the Good Times"
- Dawn feat. Tony Orlando – "Tie a Yellow Ribbon Round the Ole Oak Tree"
- Kiki Dee – "Amoureuse"
- Electric Light Orchestra – "Roll Over Beethoven"
- David Essex – "Lamplight"
- Focus – "Sylvia"
- Gary Glitter – "I'm the Leader of the Gang (I Am!)", "I Love You Love Me Love"
- Golden Earring – "Radar Love"
- The Hollies – "The Day that Curly Billy Shot Down Crazy Sam McGee"
- The Jackson 5 – "Skywriter"
- Elton John – "Daniel", "Goodbye Yellow Brick Road"
- Lynsey de Paul – "All Night", "Won't Somebody Dance With Me"
- Manfred Mann's Earth Band – "Joybringer"
- Paul McCartney and Wings – "Helen Wheels"
- Mott the Hoople – "Roll Away the Stone"
- Olivia Newton-John – "Take Me Home Country Roads"
- The New Seekers feat. Lyn Paul – "You Won't Find Another Fool Like Me"
- Marie Osmond – "Paper Roses"
- The Osmonds – "Let Me In"
- Gilbert O'Sullivan – "Why, Oh Why, Oh Why"
- Bobby Pickett and the Crypt-Kickers – "Monster Mash"
- Cliff Richard – "Power to All Our Friends", "Help It Along", "Take Me High"
- Carly Simon – "You're So Vain"
- Simon Park Orchestra – "Eye Level"
- Slade – "Cum on Feel the Noize", "Skweeze Me, Pleeze Me", "My Friend Stan", "Merry Christmas Everybody"
- Alvin Stardust – "My Coo Ca Choo"
- Ringo Starr – "Photograph"
- Status Quo – "Paper Plane"
- The Supremes – "Bad Weather"
- The Strawbs – "Shine on Silver Sun"
- Suzi Quatro – "Can the Can"
- The Sweet – "Blockbuster!", "Hell Raiser", "The Ballroom Blitz"
- The Temptations – "Plastic Man"
- Thin Lizzy – "Whiskey in the Jar"
- 10cc – "Rubber Bullets"
- The Who – "5:15"
- T. Rex – "20th Century Boy", "The Groover"
- Roxy Music – "Pyjamarama", "Street Life"
- Wizzard – "Ball Park Incident", "See My Baby Jive", "Angel Fingers", "I Wish It Could Be Christmas Everyday"
- Stevie Wonder – "Superstition"

== 1974 ==
- ABBA – "Waterloo", "So Long"
- Arrows – "Touch Too Much"
- Bay City Rollers – "Remember (Sha-La-La-La)", "Shang-a-Lang", "Summerlove Sensation", "All of Me Loves All of You"
- Cilla Black – "Baby We Can't Go Wrong", "I'll Have to Say I Love You in a Song", "He Was a Writer"
- Barry Blue – "School Love", "Hot Shot"
- Polly Brown – "Up in a Puff of Smoke"
- Gigliola Cinquetti – "Go (Before You Break My Heart)"
- Cockney Rebel – "Judy Teen", "Mr. Soft"
- T. Rex – "Teenage Dream"
- John Denver – "Annie's Song"
- Carl Douglas – "Kung Fu Fighting"
- David Essex – "Gonna Make You a Star"
- Adam Faith – "I Survived"
- Gary Glitter – "Remember Me This Way", "Always Yours", "Oh Yes! You're Beautiful"
- The Glitter Band – "Angel Face", "Just For You", "Let's Get Together Again"
- Bill Haley & His Comets – "Rock Around the Clock"
- Elton John – "Lucy in the Sky with Diamonds"
- Limmie & Family Cookin' – "A Walking Miracle"
- Lulu – "The Man Who Sold the World", "The Man With the Golden Gun"
- Lynsey de Paul – "No, Honestly"
- George McCrae – "Rock Your Baby"
- Mouth & MacNeal – "I See a Star"
- Mud – "Tiger Feet", "The Cat Crept In", "Lonely This Christmas"
- Mungo Jerry – "Long Legged Woman Dressed in Black"
- The New Seekers – "You Won't Find Another Fool Like Me", "I Get a Little Sentimental Over You"
- Olivia Newton-John – "Long Live Love"
- Pilot – "Magic"
- The Rubettes – "Sugar Baby Love", "Tonight", "Juke Box Jive"
- Suzi Quatro – "Devil Gate Drive"
- Roxy Music – "All I Want Is You"
- Queen – "Seven Seas of Rhye", "Killer Queen", "Now I'm Here"
- Cliff Richard – "(You Keep Me) Hangin' On"
- Sylvia – "Y Viva España"
- Slade – "Merry Xmas Everybody", "Everyday", "Far Far Away"
- Sparks – "This Town Ain't Big Enough for Both of Us"
- Alvin Stardust – "Jealous Mind", "Red Dress"
- The Stylistics – "Only for the Children"
- Sweet Dreams – "Honey, Honey"
- Sweet Sensation – "Sad Sweet Dreamer"
- Rufus Thomas – "Walking the Dog"
- The Three Degrees – "When Will I See You Again"
- Wizzard – "Rock 'N' Roll Winter (Loony's Tune)", "Are You Ready to Rock"
- Robert Wyatt – "I'm a Believer"
- The Wombles – "The Wombling Song", "Remember You're a Womble", "Minuetto Allegretto", "Wombling Merry Christmas"
- Stevie Wonder – "Living for the City", "He's Misstra Know It All"
- Robert Knight – "Love on a Mountain Top"
- Stealers Wheel – "Star"
- Leo Sayer – "The Show Must Go On"

== 1975 ==
- ABBA – "S.O.S."
- Arrows – "My Last Night with You"
- Average White Band – "Pick Up the Pieces"
- Bay City Rollers – "Bye Bye Baby"
- Gary Benson – "Don't Throw It All Away"
- Cilla Black – "I'll Take a Tango"
- Brass Construction – "Movin'"
- Jasper Carrott – "Funky Moped"
- Billy Connolly – "D-I-V-O-R-C-E"
- Ronnie Corbett – "Fanny"
- Dana – "Please Tell Him That I Said Hello", "It's Gonna Be a Cold, Cold Christmas"
- Lynsey de Paul – "My Man and Me", "Rhythm and Blue Jean Baby"
- Duane Eddy – "Play Me Like You Play Your Guitar"
- The Goodies – "Funky Gibbon"
- Guys 'n' Dolls – "There's a Whole Lot of Loving"
- Steve Harley & Cockney Rebel – "Make Me Smile (Come Up and See Me)", "Mr. Raffles (Man, It Was Mean)"
- Kenny – "The Bump", "Fancy Pants", "Baby I Love You OK", "Julie Anne"
- Linda Lewis – "It's in His Kiss"
- Lulu – "Take Your Mama for a Ride", "Boy Meets Girl"
- Mud – "The Secrets That You Keep"
- Lyn Paul – "It Ought to Sell a Million"
- Procol Harum – "Pandora's Box"
- Queen – "Now I'm Here", "Bohemian Rhapsody"
- Cliff Richard – "It's Only Me You've Left Behind", "Honky Tonk Angel"
- The Rubettes – "I Can Do It"
- The Shadows – "Let Me Be The One"
- Slade – "How Does It Feel", "Thanks for the Memory (Wham Bam Thank You Mam)", "In for a Penny", "Let's Call It Quits"
- Smokie – "If You Think You Know How to Love Me",
- Sparks – "Get in the Swing"
- Chris Spedding – "Motor Bikin'"
- Sweet – "Fox on the Run", "Action"
- 10cc – "Life Is a Minestrone", "I'm Not in Love"
- T. Rex – "New York City"
- Roxy Music – "Love Is the Drug"
- The Three Degrees – "Take Good Care of Yourself"
- Teach-In – "Ding-a-dong"
- The Tymes – "Someway, Somehow, I'm Keeping You"
- Wigan's Ovation – "Skiing in the Snow

== 1976 ==
- ABBA – "Mamma Mia", "Fernando"
- Andrea Tru Connection – "More, More, More"
- Joan Armatrading – "Love and Affection"
- Barry Biggs – "Side Show"
- Brotherhood of Man – "Save Your Kisses for Me", "My Sweet Rosalie"
- Eric Carmen – "All By Myself"
- Tina Charles – "I Love to Love (But My Baby Loves to Dance)", "Dance Little Lady Dance", "Love Me Like a Lover"
- Can – "I Want More (and More)"
- Climax Blues Band – "Couldn't Get It Right"
- City Boy – "The Hap-ki-do kid"
- Dana – "Never Gonna Fall in Love Again", "Fairytale"
- Barbara Dickson – "Answer Me"
- Eddie and the Hot Rods – "Get Out of Denver"
- Electric Light Orchestra – "Evil Woman", "Nightrider"
- Keith Emerson – "Honky Tonk Train Blues"
- Fox – "S-S-S-Single Bed"
- Gallagher and Lyle – "Heart On My Sleeve"
- G. Band – "Don't Make Promises That You Keep"
- Gladys Knight & the Pips – "Midnight Train to Georgia"
- Jesse Green – "Nice and Slow"
- Bobby Goldsboro – "The Story of Buck"
- Steve Harley & Cockney Rebel – "Here Comes the Sun", "(I Believe) Love's a Prima Donna"
- Harpo – "Moviestar"
- Murray Head – "Someone's Rocking My Dreamboat"
- Heavy Metal Kids – "She's No Angel"
- Hot Chocolate – "Man to Man", "Heaven's In the Backseat of My Cadillac"
- Mary Hopkin – "If You Love Me (Really Love Me)"
- Tommy Hunt – "One Fine Morning"
- J.A.L.N. Band – "Disco Music"
- Elton John – "Sorry Seems to Be the Hardest Word"
- Jimmy James and the Vagabonds – "I'll Go Where Your Music Takes Me", "Now Is The Time"
- The Kursaal Flyers – "Little Does She Know"
- Laurie Lingo and the Dipsticks – "Convoy GB"
- Liverpool Express – "You Are My Love", "Every Man Must Have a Dream"
- Barry Manilow – "Tryin' to Get the Feeling Again"
- Manfred Mann's Earth Band – "Blinded by the Light"
- John Miles – "Music", "Remember Yesterday"
- Mud – "Shake It Down"
- The New Edition – "Sunshine Saturday"
- The New Seekers – "It's So Nice (To Have You Home)"
- Paul Nicholas – "Dancing with the Captain", "Reggae Like It Used to Be", "Grandma's Party"
- Our Kid – "You Just Might See Me Cry"
- Alan Price – "Kissed Away the Night"
- Gilbert O'Sullivan – "Doing What I Know"
- Billy Ocean – "L.O.D. (Love on Delivery)", "Love Really Hurts Without You", "Stop Me (You've Heard It All Before)"
- Pussycat – "Mississippi"
- The Real Thing – "You to Me Are Everything"
- The Rolling Stones – "Fool to Cry"
- Cliff Richard – "Miss You Nights", "Devil Woman", "I Can't Ask for Anymore Than You", "Hey Mr. Dream Maker"
- The Rubettes – "You're the Reason Why"
- Sailor – "A Glass of Champagne", "Girls, Girls, Girls"
- Robin Sarstedt – "My Resistance Is Low", "Let's Fall In Love"
- Sensational Alex Harvey Band – "The Boston Tea Party"
- Sheer Elegance – "Life Is Too Short Girl"
- Sherbet – "Howzat"
- Slik – "Requiem"
- Smokie – "I'll Meet You At Midnight", "Wild, Wild Angels"
- Status Quo – "Mystery Song"
- 10cc – "I'm Mandy Fly Me"
- Thin Lizzy – "Jailbreak", "Don't Believe a Word"
- T. Rex – "I Love to Boogie", "Laser Love", "London Boys"
- The Wurzels – "Combine Harvester (Brand New Key)", "I Am a Cider Drinker"
- Johnny Wakelin – "In Zaire"
- Frankie Valli – "Fallen Angel"

== 1977 ==
- The Adverts – "Gary Gilmore's Eyes"
- Baccara – "Yes Sir, I Can Boogie"
- The Barron Knights – "Live in Trouble"
- Bay City Rollers – "It's a Game","You Made Me Believe in Magic"
- Carole Bayer Sager – "You're Moving Out Today"
- Berni Flint – "I Don't Want to Put a Hold On You"
- Cilla Black – "I Wanted to Call It Off"
- Black Gorilla – "Gimme Dat Banana"
- Blondie – "Denis"
- The Boomtown Rats – "Lookin' After No. 1", "Mary of the 4th Form"
- Boney M. – "Daddy Cool", "Ma Baker", "Belfast"
- David Bowie – "Heroes"
- Brendon – "Gimme Some"
- Brighouse and Rastrick Brass Band – "The Floral Dance"
- Elkie Brooks – "Pearl's a Singer", "Sunshine After The Rain"
- Brotherhood of Man – "Angelo", "Oh Boy (The Mood I'm In)", "Highway Man"
- The Brothers – "Sing Me"
- Contempt – "Money is a Girl's Best Friend"
- Elvis Costello – "(The Angels Wanna Wear My) Red Shoes", "Watching the Detectives"
- Darts – "Daddy Cool / The Girl Can't Help It"
- The Dead End Kids – "Have I the Right?"
- Delegation – "Where Is the Love (We Used To Know)"
- Lynsey de Paul & Mike Moran – "Rock Bottom"
- Barbara Dickson – "Another Suitcase in Another Hall"
- The Dooleys – "Love of My Life", "Think I'm Gonna Fall In Love With You"
- Carl Douglas – "Come Back"
- The Drifters – "You're More Than Number In My Little Red Book"
- David Dundas – "Another Funny Honeymoon"
- Eddie and the Hot Rods – "Do Anything You Wanna Do", "I Might Be Lying"
- The Emotions – "I Don't Want To Lose Your Love"
- Tony Etoria – "I Can Prove It"
- Generation X – "Wild Youth"
- Andy Gibb – "I Just Want to Be Your Everything"
- Gary Glitter – "Give a Little Boogie Woogie in the Back of My Mind"
- Les Gray – "A Groovy Kind of Love"
- Heatwave – "Boogie Nights"
- Hot Chocolate – "So You Win Again"
- Thelma Houston – "Don't Leave Me This Way"
- The Jacksons – "Show You the Way to Go"
- The Jam – "In the City", "All Around the World", "The Modern World"
- Gladys Knight and the Pips – "Nobody But You"
- Linda Lewis – "The Moon and I"
- Bob Marley & The Wailers – "Exodus"
- Martyn Ford Orchestra – "Let Your Body Go Downtown"
- Mary Mason – "Angel of the Morning/Any Way You Want Me"
- John Miles – "Slow Down"
- Mink De Ville – "Spanish Stroll"
- Danny Mirror – "I Remember Elvis Presley"
- The Moments – "Jack in the Box"
- Mr. Big – "Romeo"
- Marie Myriam – "The Bird and the Child"
- The New Seekers – "I Wanna Go Back"
- Olivia Newton-John – "Sam"
- John Otway and Wild Willy Barrett – "Really Free"
- Graham Parker And The Rumour – "Hold Back the Night"
- Billy Paul – "Let 'Em In"
- Suzi Quatro – "Roxy Roller", "Tear Me Apart"
- Queen – "Good Old Fashioned Lover Boy", "We Are the Champions"
- Rags – "Promises, Promises"
- The RAH Band – "The Crunch"
- The Real Thing – "You'll Never Know What You're Missing"
- Cliff Richard – "My Kinda Life", "When Two Worlds Drift Apart"
- Smokey Robinson – "Theme from The Big Time"
- Tom Robinson Band – "2-4-6-8 Motorway"
- Rockpile – "I Knew the Bride"
- Clodagh Rodgers – "Save Me"
- Rokotto – "Boogie On Up"
- The Rubettes – "Baby I Know"
- Joy Sarney – "Naughty Naughty Naughty"
- Sex Pistols – "Pretty Vacant"
- T. Rex – "The Soul of My Suit"
- Sheer Elegance – "Dance The Night Away"
- Showaddywaddy – "Dancin' Party"
- Slade – "Gypsy Roadhog", "My Baby Left Me But That's Alright Mama"
- O. C. Smith – "Together"
- Smokie – "Living Next Door to Alice", "Lay Back in the Arms of Someone"
- The Saints – "The Perfect Day"
- The Spinners – "Could It Be I'm Falling in Love"
- Rod Stewart – "The First Cut Is the Deepest"
- The Stranglers – "Go Buddy Go", "No More Heroes"
- The Strawbs – "Back In The Old Routine"
- Thin Lizzy – "Dancing in the Moonlight (It's Caught Me in Its Spotlight)"
- Danny Williams – "Dancin' Easy"
- Deniece Williams – "Free"

== 1978 ==
- Alberto y Lost Trios Paranoias – "Peter Parker", "Heads Down No-Nonsense Mindless Boogie"
- A Taste of Honey – "Boogie Oogie Oogie"
- The Adverts – "No Time to Be 21"
- Althea & Donna – "Uptown Top Ranking"
- The Babys – "Isn't It Time"
- Baccara – "Sorry, I'm a Lady"
- Hylda Baker & Arthur Mullard – "You're the One That I Want"
- The Barron Knights – "A Taste of Aggro"
- Cilla Black – "Silly Boy"
- Black Sabbath – "Never Say Die"
- Blondie – "Picture This", "Denis", "(I'm Always Touched by Your) Presence, Dear", "Hanging On The Telephone"
- Boney M. – "Mary's Boy Child/Oh My Lord", "Rivers of Babylon"
- The Boomtown Rats – "Rat Trap", "Like Clockwork", "She's So Modern"
- Brian and Michael – "Matchstalk Men and Matchstalk Cats and Dogs"
- Sarah Brightman and Hot Gossip – "I Lost My Heart to a Starship Trooper"
- Elkie Brooks – "Lilac Wine", "Don't Cry Out Loud"
- Brotherhood of Man – "Figaro", "Beautiful Lover", "Middle of the Night"
- Jackson Browne – "Stay"
- Kate Bush – "Wuthering Heights"
- Buzzcocks – "Love You More", "Ever Fallen in Love (With Someone You Shouldn't've)", "Promises"
- Andy Cameron – "Ally's Tartan Army"
- David Castle – "Ten To Eight"
- Tina Charles – "I'll Go Where Your Music Takes Me"
- City Boy – "5-7-0-5"
- Clout – "Substitute"
- Co-Co – "The Bad Old Days"
- Izhar Cohen & Alphabeta – "A-Ba-Ni-Bi"
- Colorado – "California Dreaming"
- Elvis Costello – "Pump It Up", "Radio Radio"
- The Count Bishops – "I Want Candy"
- Darts – "Don't Let It Fade Away"
- Dollar – "Shooting Star"
- The Dooleys – "Don't Take It Lyin' Down"
- Ian Dury & The Blockheads – "What A Waste"
- Eddie and the Hot Rods – "Quit This Town"
- Yvonne Elliman – "If I Can't Have You"
- Emerson, Lake & Palmer – "All I Want Is You"
- Eruption – "I Can't Stand the Rain"
- David Essex – "Goodbye First Love"
- James Galway – "Annie's Song"
- Gallagher and Lyle – "Showdown"
- Generation X – "Ready Steady Go!"
- Andy Gibb – "Shadow Dancing"
- Nick Gilder – "Hot Child in the City"
- Gordon Giltrap – "Heartsong"
- Goldie – "Making Up Again"
- The Goodies – "A Man's Best Friend Is His Duck"
- Guys 'n' Dolls – "Only Loving Does It"
- Justin Hayward – "Forever Autumn"
- Heatwave – "Always and Forever"
- Hi-Tension – "British Hustle", "Hi-Tension"
- Hot Chocolate – "I'll Put You Together Again"
- Dan Hill – "Sometimes When We Touch"
- Dee D. Jackson – "Automatic Lover"
- The Jam – "Down in the Tube Station at Midnight", "News of the World", "David Watts"
- Jimmy James and the Vagabonds – "I Can't Stop My Feet From Dancing"
- Elton John – "Part-Time Love", "Song for Guy"
- Jilted John – "Jilted John"
- Kandidate – "Don't Wanna Say Goodnight"
- Gerard Kenny – "New York, New York (So Good They Named It Twice)"
- Klark Kent – "Don't Care"
- Jonathan King – "One For You, One For Me"
- Lindisfarne – "Run for Home"
- Long Tall Ernie & The Shakers – "Do You Remember?"
- Nick Lowe – "I Love the Sound of Breaking Glass"
- Lulu – "Your Love Is Everywhere"
- Manfred Mann's Earth Band – "Davy's on the Road Again"
- The Manhattan Transfer – "On a Little Street in Singapore"
- Mankind – "Dr. Who"
- Bob Marley and the Wailers – "Satisfy My Soul"
- Marshall Hain – "Dancing In the City"
- Johnny Mathis & Deniece Williams – "Too Much, Too Little, Too Late"
- Paul McCartney and Wings – "Mull of Kintyre"
- Frankie Miller – "Darlin'"
- Motörhead – "Louie Louie"
- The Motors – "Airport", "Forget About You"
- Mud – "Cut Across Shorty"
- The New Seekers – "Anthem"
- Olivia Newton-John – "A Little More Love"
- Sally Oldfield – "Mirrors"
- The Olympic Runners – "Get It While You Can"
- Plastic Bertrand – "Ça plane pour moi", "Sha La La La Lee"
- Public Image Ltd. – "Public Image"
- Suzi Quatro – "If You Can't Give Me Love"
- Racey – "Lay Your Love On Me"
- Jim Rafferty – "Don't Let Another Good Day Go By"
- Chris Rea – "Fool If You Think It's Over"
- The Real Thing – "Rainin' Through My Sunshine"
- Renaissance – "Northern Lights"
- The Rezillos – "Top of the Pops", "Destination Venus"
- The Rich Kids – "Rich Kids"
- Cliff Richard – "Please Remember Me"
- Tom Robinson Band – "Up Against The Wall", "Don't Take No for an Answer"
- Rokotto – "Funk Theory"
- Rose Royce – "Love Don't Live Here Anymore"
- San Jose featuring Rodriguez Argentina – "Argentine Melody (Cancion de Argentina)"
- Leo Sayer – "Raining In My Heart", "Lydia"
- Sham 69 – "Hurry Up Harry", "Angels with Dirty Faces", "If the Kids Are United"
- Rocky Sharpe and the Replays – "Rama Lama Ding Dong"
- Showaddywaddy – "Pretty Little Angel Eyes"
- The Skids – "The Saints Are Coming"
- Patti Smith – "Because the Night"
- Smokie – "Oh Carol"
- Dusty Springfield – "A Love Like Yours (Don't Come Knocking Everyday)"
- Squeeze – "Take Me I'm Yours"
- Steel Pulse – "Prodigal Son"
- The Stranglers – "Nice 'n' Sleazy", "Walk On By"
- The Streetband – "Toast"
- Sweet – "Love Is Like Oxygen"
- Rachel Sweet – "B-A-B-Y"
- 10cc – "Dreadlock Holiday"
- Thin Lizzy – "Rosalie"
- The Three Degrees – "Giving Up Giving In"
- Tonight – "Money (That's Your Problem)", "Drummer Man"
- The Undertones – "Teenage Kicks"
- The Vibrators – "Automatic Lover"
- Voyage – "From East to West"
- Don Williams – "I've Got a Winner in You"
- Terry Wogan – "The Floral Dance"
- X-Ray Spex – "Germfree Adolescents", "The Day the World Turned Day-Glo"
- Yellow Dog – "One More Night", "Wait Until Midnight"

== 1979 ==
- Angelic Upstarts – "Teenage Warning"
- The Beat – "Tears of a Clown"
- Black Lace – "Mary Ann"
- Blondie – "Heart of Glass", "Sunday Girl", "Dreaming" "Union City Blue"
- Boney M. – "Painter Man"
- The Boomtown Rats – "I Don't Like Mondays"
- Brotherhood of Man – "Goodbye, Goodbye"
- The Buggles – "Video Killed the Radio Star"
- Buzzcocks – "Everybody's Happy Nowadays", "Harmony in My Head"
- Chas & Dave – "Gertcha"
- Chic – "Le Freak", "I Want Your Love"
- Chantal Curtis – "Get Another Love"
- The Commodores – "Sail On"
- Elvis Costello – "Oliver's Army", "Accidents Will Happen"
- The Damned – "Love Song"
- Dana – "Something's Cooking In The Kitchen"
- Dan-I – "Monkey Chop"
- Darts – "Get It"
- Dollar – "Shooting Star", "Who Were You with in the Moonlight?", "Love's Gotta Hold on Me", "I Wanna Hold Your Hand"
- The Dooleys – "Honey I'm Lost", "Wanted", "The Chosen Few"
- Dr. Feelgood – "Milk and Alcohol"
- Driver 67 – "Car 67"
- Ian Dury & The Blockheads – "Hit Me With Your Rhythm Stick"
- Eruption – "One Way Ticket"
- Dame Edna Everage – "Disco Matilda"
- Fiddler's Dram – "Day Trip to Bangor"
- The Flying Lizards – "Money"
- Art Garfunkel – "Bright Eyes"
- Leif Garrett – "I Was Made for Dancin'"
- Gloria Gaynor – "I Will Survive"
- Generation X – "King Rocker", "Valley of the Dolls"
- Gonzalez – "Haven't Stopped Dancing Yet"
- Eddy Grant – "Living on the Frontline"
- The Greedies – "A Merry Jingle"
- Patrick Hernandez – "Born To Be Alive"
- Joe Jackson – "Is She Really Going Out with Him?"
- Mick Jackson – "Weekend"
- The Jacksons – "Destiny"
- The Jags – "Back of My Hand"
- The Jam – "Strange Town" (two versions), "When You're Young", "The Eton Rifles" (two versions)
- Judas Priest – "Take On the World", "Evening Star"
- Janet Kay – "Silly Games"
- Kandidate – "I Don't Wanna Lose You"
- The Knack – "My Sharona"
- The Leyton Buzzards – "Saturday Night (Beneath the Plastic Palm Trees)"
- Light of the World – "Swingin'"
- Linda Lewis – "I'd Be Surprisingly Good for You"
- Lene Lovich – "Lucky Number"
- Nick Lowe – "Cracking Up"
- M – "Pop Muzik"
- Madness – "The Prince", "One Step Beyond"
- Lena Martell – "One Day at a Time"
- Matchbox – "Rockabilly Rebel"
- Matumbi – "Point of View"
- The Members – "The Sound of the Suburbs", "Offshore Banking Business"
- Milk and Honey – "Hallelujah"
- The Monks – "Nice Legs Shame About Her Face"
- The Moody Blues – "Nights in White Satin"
- Nazareth – "May the Sun Shine"
- New Musik – "Straight Lines"
- Gary Numan – "Cars", "Complex"
- Mike Oldfield – "Guilty"
- Thom Pace – "Maybe"
- Paul Evans – "Hello, This Is Joanie"
- Peaches & Herb – "Shake Your Groove Thing"
- The Police – "Roxanne", "Can't Stand Losing You"
- The Pretenders – "Stop Your Sobbing", "Brass in Pocket", "Kid"
- Public Image Ltd. – "Death Disco"
- Suzi Quatro – "She's in Love with You"
- Racey – "Some Girls"
- The Ramblers – "The Sparrow"
- The Real Thing – "Can You Feel the Force?"
- Cliff Richard – "Green Light", "We Don't Talk Anymore", "Hot Shot"
- B. A. Robertson – "Knocked It Off"
- Roxy Music – "Dance Away"
- The Ruts – "Babylon's Burning" “Something that I Said”
- Sad Café – "Every Day Hurts"
- Secret Affair – "Let Your Heart Dance"
- The Selecter – "On My Radio"
- Sex Pistols – "Something Else", "Silly Thing" “C’mon Everybody”
- The Shadows – "Theme from the Deer Hunter"
- Sham 69 – "Questions and Answers", "Hersham Boys", "You're a Better Man Than I"
- Showaddywaddy – "A Night at Daddy Gee's", "Remember Then"
- Siouxsie and the Banshees – "Playground Twist"
- The Skids – "Into the Valley", "Masquerade" “Charade” “Working for the Yankee Dollar”
- Sniff 'n' the Tears – "Driver's Seat"
- Sparks – "Beat The Clock", "The Number One Song in Heaven", "Tryouts For The Human Race"
- Dusty Springfield – "I'm Coming Home Again"
- Squeeze – "Cool for Cats", "Slap and Tickle", "Up the Junction"
- The Special A.K.A. – "Gangsters"
- Stonebridge McGuinness – "Oo-Eeh Baby"
- Edwin Starr – "Contact", "H.A.P.P.Y. Radio"
- The Stranglers – "Duchess", "Don't Bring Harry"
- The Sutherland Brothers – "Easy Come, Easy Go"
- Motörhead – "Overkill", "Bomber"
- Telex – "Rock Around The Clock"
- Thin Lizzy – "Waiting for an Alibi", "Sarah"
- The Tourists – "Blind Among the Flowers", "I Only Wanna Be with You"
- The Tubes – "Prime Time"
- Tubeway Army – "Are 'Friends' Electric?"
- Judie Tzuke – "Stay with Me till Dawn"
- UK Subs – "Stranglehold", "Tomorrows Girls", "She's Not There"
- The Undertones – "Here Comes the Summer", "Jimmy Jimmy", "You've Got My Number (Why Don't You Use It?)"
- Violinski – "Clog Dance"
- Anita Ward – "Ring My Bell"
- Max Webster – "Paradise Skies"
- Ruby Winters – "Baby Lay Down"
- XTC – "Making Plans For Nigel", "Life Begins at the Hop"

== 1980 ==
- AC/DC – "Touch Too Much"
- Adam and the Ants – "Antmusic", "Dog Eat Dog"
- Bad Manners – "Ne-Ne Na-Na Na-Na Nu-Nu", "Lip Up Fatty"
- The Barracudas – "Summer Fun"
- The Beat – "Tears of a Clown", "Hands Off...She's Mine", "Mirror in the Bathroom", "Too Nice to Talk To"
- Kurtis Blow – "Christmas Rappin'"
- The Boomtown Rats – "Banana Republic"
- The Buggles – "Living in the Plastic Age", "Clean, Clean"
- Chas & Dave – "Rabbit"
- Cockney Rejects – "The Greatest Cockney Rip Off", "I'm Forever Blowing Bubbles"
- The Cure – "A Forest"
- Dexys Midnight Runners – "Dance Stance", "Geno"
- Barbara Dickson – "January February"
- Sheena Easton – "Morning Train (9 to 5)"
- The Flying Lizards – "TV"
- John Foxx – "Underpass"
- Peter Gabriel – "No Self Control"
- Genesis – "Turn It On Again"
- Gibson Brothers – "Cuba"
- Eddy Grant – "Do You Feel My Love"
- Hot Chocolate – "No Doubt About It", "Are You Getting Enough of What Makes You Happy"
- The Human League – "Rock 'N' Roll"
- Iron Maiden – "Running Free"
- The Jam – "Going Underground"
- Joe Jackson – "It's Different for Girls"
- Judas Priest – "Living After Midnight", "United"
- Kool & the Gang – "Celebration"
- The Lambrettas – "Poison Ivy"
- Jona Lewie – "You'll Always Find Me in the Kitchen at Parties", "Stop the Cavalry"
- Linx – "You're Lying"
- Liquid Gold – "Dance Yourself Dizzy"
- Johnny Logan – "What's Another Year?"
- Madness – "Baggy Trousers", "Embarrassment", "My Girl", "Night Boat to Cairo"
- Kelly Marie – "Feels Like I'm in Love"
- Matchbox – "When You Ask About Love"
- Motörhead – "Ace of Spades"
- New Musik – "Living by Numbers"
- The Nolans – "I'm In the Mood for Dancing", "Don't Make Waves", "Who's Gonna Rock You"
- Gary Numan – "We Are Glass", "I Die: You Die", "This Wreckage"
- Billy Ocean – "Are You Ready"
- Odyssey – "If You're Lookin' for a Way Out"
- Orchestral Manoeuvres in the Dark – "Messages", "Enola Gay"
- Robert Palmer – "Looking for Clues"
- The Piranhas – "Tom Hark"
- The Pretenders – "Brass in Pocket", "Talk of the Town"
- Prima Donna – Love Enough for Two"
- The Ramones – "Baby, I Love You"
- Cliff Richard – "Dreamin'"
- Roxy Music – "Over You"
- Jimmy Ruffin – "Hold On (To My Love)"
- The Ruts – "Staring at the Rude Boys"
- Saxon – "Wheels of Steel"
- Showaddywaddy – "Blue Moon"
- Siouxsie and the Banshees – "Happy House"
- Skids – "Working for the Yankee Dollar"
- Spandau Ballet – "To Cut a Long Story Short"
- The Specials – "Do Nothing"
- Split Enz – "I Got You"
- Squeeze – "Another Nail in My Heart", "Pulling Mussels (From the Shell)"
- St. Winifred's School Choir – "There's No One Quite Like Grandma"
- Status Quo – "What You're Proposing"
- Stiff Little Fingers – "Nobody's Hero", "At the Edge"
- The Stranglers – "Thrown Away"
- Stray Cats – "Runaway Boys"
- UB40 – "Food For Thought", "The Earth Dies Screaming"
- UFO – "Young Blood"
- UK Subs – "Warhead", "Teenage", "Party In Paris"
- Ultravox – "Sleepwalk"
- The Undertones – "My Perfect Cousin"
- The Vapors – "Turning Japanese"
- Dennis Waterman – "I Could Be So Good For You"

== 1981 ==
- ABC – "Tears Are Not Enough"
- Adam and the Ants – "Antmusic", "Kings of the Wild Frontier"
- Altered Images – "Happy Birthday"
- Laurie Anderson – "O Superman"
- Aneka – "Japanese Boy"
- Bad Manners – "Lorraine", "Just a Feeling", "Buona Sera"
- The Beat – "Drowning", "All Out to Get You", "Too Nice to Talk To"
- Beggar and Co – "(Somebody) Help Me Out", "Mule (Chant No.2)"
- Graham Bonnet – "Night Games"
- Colin Blunstone & Dave Stewart – "What Becomes of the Brokenhearted"
- Bucks Fizz – "Making Your Mind Up", "Piece of the Action", "One of Those Nights", "The Land of Make Believe"
- Chas and Dave – "Rabbit", "Stars Over 45", "Ossie's Dream (Spurs Are on Their Way to Wembley)" (with Tottenham Hotspur FC)
- Coast to Coast – "(Do) The Hucklebuck"
- Phil Collins – "In the Air Tonight", "I Missed Again", "If Leaving Me Is Easy"
- Randy Crawford – "You Might Need Somebody"
- The Creatures – "Mad Eyed Screamer"
- The Cure – "Primary"
- Depeche Mode – "Just Can't Get Enough", "New Life"
- Dexys Midnight Runners – "Show Me"
- Dollar – "Hand Held In Black And White", "Mirror Mirror (Mon Amor)"
- Duran Duran – "Planet Earth", "Careless Memories", "Girls on Film", "My Own Way"
- The Exploited – "Dead Cities"
- Susan Fassbender – "Twilight Café"
- John Foxx – "Europe After the Rain"
- Freeez – "Southern Freeez", "Flying High"
- Fun Boy Three – "The Lunatics (Have Taken Over the Asylum)"
- Funkapolitan – "As the Time Goes By"
- The Fureys & Davey Arthur – "When You Were Sweet Sixteen"
- Genesis – "Abacab"
- Gidea Park – "Beach Boy Gold"
- Girlschool – " Hit & Run"
- Godley & Creme – "Under Your Thumb", "Wedding Bells"
- Haircut One Hundred – "Favourite Shirts (Boy Meets Girl)"
- Headgirl (Motörhead/Girlschool) – "Please Don't Touch"
- Honey Bane – "Turn Me On, Turn Me Off"
- The Human League – "Don't You Want Me", "Love Action (I Believe in Love)", "The Sound of the Crowd", "Open Your Heart"
- Sheila Hylton – "The Bed's Too Big Without You"
- Julio Iglesias – "Begin the Beguine"
- Imagination – "Body Talk"
- The Jam – "Absolute Beginners"
- Japan – "Quiet Life"
- Level 42 – "Love Games"
- Linx – "Intuition", "Throw Away The Key", "So This Is Romance"
- Liquid Gold – "Don't Panic"
- The Look – "I Am the Beat"
- Kiki Dee – "Star"
- Kirsty MacColl – "There's a Guy Works Down the Chip Shop Swears He's Elvis"
- Madness – "Return of the Los Palmas 7", "Shut Up", "It Must Be Love"
- Matchbox – "Somewhere Over the Rainbow", "Babes In The Wood"
- Modern Romance – "Ay Ay Ay Ay Moosey", "Everybody Salsa"
- Motörhead – "Motorhead"
- The Nolans – "Who's Gonna Rock You"
- Gary Numan – "She's Got Claws"
- Gary Numan & Dramatis – "Love Needs No Disguise"
- Hazel O'Connor – "Will You"
- Orchestral Manoeuvres in the Dark – "Souvenir", "Joan of Arc"
- The Passions – "I'm in Love with a German Film Star"
- The Police – "Spirits in the Material World"
- Racey – "Runaround Sue"
- Cliff Richard – "Daddy's Home"
- Sad Café – "I'm In Love Again"
- Shakin' Stevens – "Green Door", "This Ole House", "You Drive Me Crazy"
- Sharon Redd – "Can You Handle It"
- Siouxsie and the Banshees – "Spellbound"
- Slade – "We'll Bring The House Down", "Lock Up Your Daughters"
- Snowmen – "Hokey Cokey"
- Soft Cell – "Tainted Love", "Bedsitter"
- Spandau Ballet – "The Freeze", "Musclebound", "Chant No.1 (I Don't Need This Pressure On)"
- The Specials – "Ghost Town"
- Starsound – "Stars On 45"
- Status Quo – "Rock 'n' Roll", "Something 'Bout You Baby (I Like)"
- The Stranglers – "Thrown Away"
- Dave Stewart & Barbara Gaskin – "It's My Party"
- Stray Cats – "Rock This Town"
- Roger Taylor – "Future Management"
- The Teardrop Explodes – "Reward", "Treason", "Passionate Friend"
- Tenpole Tudor – "Swords of a Thousand Men", "Wünderbar"
- Thin Lizzy – "Are You Ready?"
- Toyah – "It's a Mystery"(2x), "Good Morning Universe"
- U2 – "Fire"
- UB40 – "Don't Let It Pass You By", "One In Ten"
- UFO – "Lonely Heart"
- UK Subs – "Keep On Running (Til You Burn)"
- Ultravox – "Vienna", "All Stood Still", "The Thin Wall", "The Voice"
- Kim Wilde – "Kids In America" (2x), "Chequered Love", "Water on Glass", "Cambodia"
- XTC – "Sgt. Rock (Is Going to Help Me)"
- Lena Zavaroni – "Roses And Rainbows"

== 1982 ==
- ABC – "Poison Arrow", "The Look of Love"
- Adam Ant – "Goody Two Shoes"
- Altered Images – "See Those Eyes"
- The Associates – "Party Fears Two", "Club Country", "18 Carat Love Affair"
- Bauhaus – "Bela Lugosi's Dead", "Ziggy Stardust"
- Bardo – "One Step Further"
- Toni Basil – "Mickey"
- The Belle Stars – "The Clapping Song"
- Blancmange – "Living on the Ceiling"
- The Boomtown Rats – "House on Fire"
- Bow Wow Wow – "Go Wild in the Country"
- Boys Town Gang – "Can't Take My Eyes Off You"
- Bucks Fizz – "The Land of Make Believe", "My Camera Never Lies", "Now those Days are Gone", "If You Can't Stand the Heat"
- Charlene – "I've Never Been to Me"
- Clannad – "Theme From Harry's Game"
- David Christie – "Saddle Up"
- Culture Club – "Do You Really Want to Hurt Me", "Time (Clock of the Heart)"
- Depeche Mode – "See You", "The Meaning Of Love", "Leave In Silence"
- Dexys Midnight Runners – "Come On Eileen", "Jackie Wilson Said (I'm in Heaven When You Smile)", "Let's Get This Straight (From the Start)"
- Thomas Dolby – "Windpower"
- Dollar – "Give Me Back My Heart", "Videotheque", "Give Me Some Kinda Magic"
- Duran Duran – "Hungry Like the Wolf", "Rio"
- Echo And The Bunnymen – "Back Of Love"
- The Firm – "Arthur Daley (E's Alright)"
- A Flock of Seagulls – "Wishing (If I Had a Photograph of You)"
- Foster and Allen – "A Bunch of Thyme"
- Fun Boy Three – "It Ain't What You Do...." (feat. Bananarama), "The Telephone Always Rings", "Summertime"
- Genesis – "Paperlate"
- Goombay Dance Band – "Seven Tears"
- Haircut One Hundred – "Love Plus One", "Nobody's Fool"
- Haysi Fantayzee – "John Wayne Is Big Leggy"
- Heaven 17 – "Play To Win"
- The Human League – "Mirror Man"
- Imagination – "Music and Lights", "Just an Illusion", "Changes"
- Incantation – "Cacharpaya"
- The Jam – "Town Called Malice", "Precious", "Beat Surrender"
- Japan – "Ghosts", "Cantonese Boy"
- Jon & Vangelis – "I'll Find My Way Home"
- Junior – "Mama Used to Say"
- Kid Creole and the Coconuts – "Annie, I'm Not Your Daddy"
- Killing Joke – "Empire Song"
- Kool & the Gang – "Ooh La La (Let's Go Dancin')"
- Kraftwerk – "The Model"
- Nicole – "A Little Peace"
- The Maisonettes – "Heartache Avenue"
- Madness – "Cardiac Arrest", "Driving in My Car", "Our House"
- Modern Romance – "Best Years of Our Lives", "Cherry Pink and Apple Blossom White"
- Monsoon – "Ever So Lonely"
- Motörhead – "Iron Fist"
- Musical Youth – "Pass The Dutchie"
- Natasha – "Iko Iko"
- Gary Numan – "We Take Mystery (To Bed)", "Music For Chameleons", "White Boys And Heroes"
- Orchestral Manoeuvres in the Dark – "Maid Of Orleans"
- PhD – "I Won't Let You Down"
- Pluto – "Your Honour"
- Queen – "Las Palabras de Amor (The Words of Love)"
- Cliff Richard – "Little Town"
- Robert Palmer – "Some Guys Have All the Luck"
- Captain Sensible – "Happy Talk", "Wot"
- Shakatak – "Night Birds"
- Shakin' Stevens – "Oh Julie", "Shirley", "Give Me Your Heart Tonight"
- Sheena Easton – "Machinery"
- Shalamar – "A Night to Remember", "There It Is"
- Showaddywaddy – "Who Put the Bomp"
- Simple Minds – "Promised You A Miracle", "Glittering Prize"
- Siouxsie and the Banshees – "Fireworks"
- Spandau Ballet – "Instinction", "Lifeline"
- Soft Cell – "Torch" (feat. Cindy Ecstasy), "What", "Where The Heart Is"
- The Stranglers – "Golden Brown", "Strange Little Girl"
- Tears for Fears – "Mad World"
- Tight Fit – "The Lion Sleeps Tonight"
- Toto Coelo – "I Eat Cannibals"
- Trio – "Da Da Da"
- UB40 – "I Won't Close My Eyes", "So Here I Am"
- Ultravox – "Hymn"
- Visage – "The Damned Don't Cry"
- Dionne Warwick – "Heartbreaker"
- Wavelength – "Hurry Home"
- Wham! – "Young Guns (Go for It)"
- Kim Wilde – "View from a Bridge"
- XTC – "Senses Working Overtime"
- Yazoo – "Only You", "Don't Go", "The Other Side of Love"

== 1983 ==
- Adam Ant – "Puss N' Boots"
- Altered Images – "Don't Talk to Me About Love"
- Patti Austin and James Ingram – "Baby, Come to Me"
- Bananarama – "Na Na Hey Hey Kiss Him Goodbye", "Cruel Summer"
- Bauhaus – "Lagartija Nick", "She's in Parties"
- The Beat – "Can't Get Used to Losing You"
- Laura Branigan “Gloria”
- The Belle Stars – "Sign of the Times", "Sweet Memory"
- Big Country – "Fields of Fire", "In a Big Country"
- Blancmange – "Blind Vision"
- Booker Newberry III – "Love Town"
- Bucks Fizz – "Run for Your Life", "When We Were Young", "London Town"
- Gary Byrd and the GB Experience – "The Crown"
- Central Line – "Nature Boy"
- China Crisis – "Christian"
- Joe Cocker and Jennifer Warnes – "Up Where We Belong"
- Culture Club – "Church of the Poison Mind", "Karma Chameleon"
- The Creatures – "Miss the Girl", "Right Now"
- The Cure – "The Walk", "The Love Cats"
- Depeche Mode – "Get the Balance Right!", "Everything Counts", "Love, in Itself"
- Dennis Waterman & George Cole – "What Are We Gonna Get 'Er Indoors?"
- Duran Duran – "Is There Something I Should Know?"
- Echo & The Bunnymen – "The Cutter", "Never Stop"
- Eurythmics – "Sweet Dreams (Are Made of This)", "Right By Your Side"
- The Flying Pickets – "Only You"
- Freeez – "I.O.U.", "Pop Goes My Love"
- Fun Boy Three – "Tunnel of Love", "Our Lips Are Sealed"
- Galaxy – "Dancing Tight"
- Nick Heyward – "Whistle Down the Wind", "Blue Hat for a Blue Day"
- Elton John – "I Guess That's Why They Call It the Blues", "Kiss the Bride"
- Haysi Fantayzee – "Shiny Shiny"
- Heaven 17 – "Temptation", "Come Live with Me", "Crushed by the Wheels of Industry"
- Howard Jones – "New Song", "What Is Love?"
- The Human League – "(Keep Feeling) Fascination"
- Joe Jackson – "Steppin' Out"
- Jimmy the Hoover – "Tantalise (Wo Wo Ee Yeh Yeh)"
- JoBoxers – "Boxerbeat", "Just Got Lucky"
- David Joseph – "You Can't Hide Your Love"
- Kajagoogoo – "Too Shy", "Ooh to Be Ah", "Big Apple"
- KC and the Sunshine Band – "Give It Up"
- The Kinks – "Come Dancing"
- Kissing the Pink – "The Last Film"
- Annabel Lamb – "Riders on the Storm"
- Level 42 – "The Chinese Way", "The Sun Goes Down (Living It Up)"
- Madness – "Tomorrow's (Just Another Day)", "The Sun and the Rain"
- Marillion – "Garden Party"
- Marilyn – "Calling Your Name"
- Men at Work – "Overkill"
- Modern Romance – "Don't Stop That Crazy Rhythm", "High Life", "Walking in the Rain"
- Lydia Murdock – "Superstar"
- New Order – "Blue Monday"
- Gary Numan – "Warriors", "Sister Surprise"
- Mike Oldfield – "Moonlight Shadow"
- Orange Juice – "Rip It Up"
- Orchestral Manoeuvres in the Dark – "Genetic Engineering"
- Ryan Paris – "Dolce Vita"
- The Police – "Every Breath You Take", "Wrapped Around Your Finger"
- Sharon Redd – "In the Name of Love"
- Shakin' Stevens – "Cry Just a Little Bit", "It's Late"
- Shalamar – "Dead Giveaway", "Disappearing Act"
- Siouxsie and the Banshees – "Dear Prudence"
- Slade – "Merry Christmas Everybody", "My Oh My"
- The Smiths – "This Charming Man"
- Spandau Ballet – "Communication", "True"
- The Stranglers – "European Female"
- The Style Council – "Speak Like a Child", "Money Go Round", "Long Hot Summer", "Paris Match"
- Sunfire – "Young, Free And Single"
- Sweet Dreams – "I'm Never Giving Up"
- Tears for Fears – "Change", "Pale Shelter"
- Thompson Twins – "Love On Your Side", "We Are Detective", "Hold Me Now"
- The Truth – "Confusion (Hits Us Every Time)", "A Step in the Right Direction"
- Twisted Sister – "I Am (I'm Me)"
- Bonnie Tyler – "Total Eclipse of the Heart"
- U2 – "New Year's Day", "Two Hearts Beat as One"
- UB40 – "Red Red Wine", "Please Don't Make Me Cry"
- Tracey Ullman – "They Don't Know", "Breakaway"
- Ultravox – "We Came to Dance"
- Wah! – "The Story of the Blues"
- Wham! – "Wham Rap! (Enjoy What You Do)", "Bad Boys", "Club Tropicana"
- Kim Wilde – "Love Blonde" (twice)
- Yazoo – "Nobody's Diary"
- Tracie Young – "The House That Jack Built"

== 1984 ==
- Alphaville – "Big in Japan"
- Bananarama – "Robert De Niro's Waiting..."
- Band Aid – "Do They Know It's Christmas?"
- Belle and the Devotions – "Love Games"
- Black Lace – "Agadoo"
- Blancmange – "Don't Tell Me"
- The Bluebells – "I'm Falling"
- Laura Branigan – "Self Control"
- Break Machine – "Street Dance"
- Bronski Beat – "Why?", "It Ain't Necessarily So", "Smalltown Boy"
- Bucks Fizz – "Talking in Your Sleep"
- The Council Collective – "Soul Deep"
- Culture Club – "The War Song" (x2), "Do They Know It's Christmas?"
- The Cure – "The Caterpillar"
- Hazell Dean – "Searchin' (I Gotta Find a Man)"
- Dead or Alive – "That's The Way (I Like It)"
- Depeche Mode – "Master and Servant", "People Are People", "Blasphemous Rumours"
- Jim Diamond – "I Should Have Known Better"
- Duran Duran – "The Reflex", "Wild Boys"
- Echo & the Bunnymen – "The Killing Moon", "Silver"
- Joe Fagin – "That's Living Alright"
- Fiction Factory – "(Feels Like) Heaven"
- A Flock Of Seagulls – "The More You Live, The More You Love"
- The Flying Pickets – "When You're Young and in Love"
- Frankie Goes to Hollywood – "Relax", "Two Tribes", "The Power of Love"
- General Public – "General Public"
- Gary Glitter – "Another Rock N' Roll Christmas", "Dance Me Up"
- Heaven 17 – "This Is Mine"
- Nick Heyward – "Warning Sign"
- Hot Chocolate – "I Gave You My Heart (Didn't I)"
- Howard Jones – "Hide and Seek", "Pearl in the Shell"
- The Icicle Works – "Love Is a Wonderful Colour"
- Billy Idol – "Eyes Without a Face"
- Nik Kershaw – "Wouldn't It Be Good", "I Won't Let the Sun Go Down on Me", "Dancing Girls", "The Riddle"
- Cyndi Lauper – "Girls Just Want to Have Fun", "Time After Time"
- Level 42 – "Hot Water"
- Madness – "Michael Caine", "One Better Day"
- Madonna – "Holiday", "Like a Virgin"
- Marillion – "Punch and Judy"
- Marilyn – "Cry and Be Fee"
- George Michael – "Careless Whisper"
- The Mighty Wah – "Come Back"
- Alison Moyet – "Love Resurrection", "All Cried Out", "Invisible"
- Musical Youth – "Sixteen"
- Neil – "Hole in My Shoe"
- Nena – "99 Red Balloons"
- New Order – "Thieves Like Us"
- Gary Numan – "Berserker"
- Orchestral Manoeuvres in the Dark – "Locomotion", "Talking Loud and Clear", "Tesla Girls"
- Ray Parker Jr. – "Ghostbusters"
- Re-Flex – "The Politics of Dancing"
- Roland Rat – "Rat Rappin'"
- Alexei Sayle – "'Ullo John! Gotta New Motor?"
- Scritti Politti – "Wood Beez (Pray Like Aretha Franklin)", "Absolute"
- Shakatak – "Down on the Street"
- Shakin' Stevens – "A Letter to You", "A Love Worth Waiting For", "A Rockin' Good Way" (feat. Bonnie Tyler), "Teardrops" (feat. Hank Marvin)
- Feargal Sharkey – "Listen to Your Father"
- Siouxsie and the Banshees – "Swimming Horses"
- Sister Sledge – "Lost In Music"
- Slade – "Run Runaway", "All Join Hands"
- The Smiths – "What Difference Does It Make?", "Hand in Glove" (feat. Sandie Shaw), "Heaven Knows I'm Miserable Now", "William, It Was Really Nothing"
- Snowy White – "Bird of Paradise"
- Spandau Ballet – "Only When You Leave", "I'll Fly for You", "Highly Strung", "Round and Round"
- The Special AKA – "Free Nelson Mandela"
- The Stranglers – "Skin Deep"
- The Style Council – "My Ever Changing Moods", "Shout To The Top"
- Tears for Fears – "Shout", Mothers Talk
- Thompson Twins – "Doctor! Doctor!", "You Take Me Up", "Sister of Mercy", "Lay Your Hands on Me"
- Toy Dolls – "Nellie the Elephant"
- Tina Turner – "Help", "Better Be Good to Me"
- UB40 – "Cherry Oh Baby", "If It Happens Again"
- Ultravox – "One Small Day", "Dancing with Tears in My Eyes", "Lament", "Love's Great Adventure"
- Wang Chung – "Dance Hall Days"
- The Weather Girls – "It's Raining Men"
- Wham! – "Wake Me Up Before You Go-Go", "Freedom"
- Kim Wilde – "The Second Time"
- Stevie Wonder – "I Just Called to Say I Love You"
- Roy Wood – "I Wish It Could Be Christmas Everyday"

== 1985 ==
- a-ha – "Take On Me"
- Arcadia – "Election Day"
- Amazulu – "Don't You Just Know It"
- Steve Arrington – "Feel So Real"
- Baltimora – "Tarzan Boy"
- Big Sound Authority – "This House (Is Where Your Love Stands)"
- Bronski Beat – "Hit That Perfect Beat"
- Bucks Fizz – "I Hear Talk"
- Kate Bush – "Running Up That Hill"
- Cameo – "Single Life"
- David Cassidy – "The Last Kiss"
- Lloyd Cole – "Brand New Friend"
- Phil Collins – "Sussudio" (with his Hot Tub Band), "Take Me Home"
- Colonel Abrams – "Trapped"
- The Colourfield – "Thinking of You"
- The Cult – "Rain", "She Sells Sanctuary"
- The Cure – "In Between Days"
- Dead or Alive – "You Spin Me Round (Like a Record)", "In Too Deep", "Lover Come Back to Me"
- Depeche Mode – "Shake the Disease", "It's Called a Heart"
- Elaine Paige & Barbara Dickson – "I Know Him So Well"
- Eurythmics – "There Must Be an Angel (Playing with My Heart)"
- Fine Young Cannibals – "Johnny Come Home"
- Go West – "We Close Our Eyes", "Call Me", "Goodbye Girl", "Don't Look Down – The Sequel"
- Grandmaster Melle Mel & The Furious Five – "Step Off"
- Don Henley – "The Boys of Summer"
- Aled Jones – "Walking in the Air"
- Howard Jones – "Things Can Only Get Better", "Look Mama"
- Killing Joke – "Love Like Blood"
- King – "Love & Pride", "Won't You Hold My Hand Now", "Alone Without You", "The Taste Of Your Tears"
- Dee C. Lee – "See the Day"
- Level 42 – "Something About You"
- The Limit – "Say Yeah"
- Madness – "Yesterday's Men", "Uncle Sam"
- Mai Tai – "History", "Body And Soul"
- Marillion – "Kayleigh", "Lavender"
- Matt Bianco – "Yeh Yeh"
- Mr. Mister – "Broken Wings"
- Alison Moyet – "Invisible", "That Ole Devil Called Love"
- Gary Numan & Bill Sharpe – "Change Your Mind"
- Billy Ocean – "Suddenly"
- Orchestral Manoeuvres in the Dark – "So In Love"
- John Parr – "St. Elmo's Fire (Man in Motion)"
- Pet Shop Boys – "West End Girls"
- Phyllis Nelson – "Move Closer"
- Prefab Sprout – "When Love Breaks Down"
- Princess – "Say I'm Your Number One"
- Propaganda – "Duel"
- Red Box – "Lean On Me (Ah-Li-Ayo)"
- Rene & Angela – "I'll Be Good"
- Jennifer Rush – "The Power of Love"
- Scritti Politti – "The Word Girl"
- Shakin' Stevens – "Lipstick, Powder & Paint", "Merry Christmas Everyone"
- Smiley Culture – "Police Officer"
- The Smiths – "How Soon Is Now?", "The Boy with the Thorn in His Side"
- Amii Stewart – "Friends", "Knock on Wood"
- Sting – "If You Love Somebody Set Them Free"
- Strawberry Switchblade – "Since Yesterday"
- The Style Council – "Walls Come Tumbling Down", "The Lodgers"
- Tears for Fears – "Everybody Wants to Rule the World"
- Bonnie Tyler – "Holding Out for a Hero"
- UB40 – "Don't Break My Heart"
- Midge Ure – "If I Was"
- Maria Vidal – "Body Rock"
- Wham! – "Everything She Wants"
- Kim Wilde – "Rage to Love"

== 1986 ==
- a-ha – "The Sun Always Shines on T.V.", "Cry Wolf"
- Amazulu – "Too Good to Be Forgotten"
- Art of Noise & Duane Eddy – "Peter Gunn"
- Bananarama – "Venus"
- Belouis Some – "Imagination"
- Bon Jovi – "You Give Love a Bad Name", "Livin' on a Prayer"
- The Banned – "Something Outa Nothing"
- The Bangles – "Walk Like an Egyptian"
- Big Audio Dynamite – "E=MC²"
- Bucks Fizz – "New Beginning (Mamba Seyra)"
- Kate Bush – "Hounds of Love"
- Chris de Burgh – "The Lady in Red"
- Cameo – "Word Up!"
- Claire & Friends – "It's 'Orrible Being in Love"
- The Communards ft. Sarah Jane Morris – "Don't Leave Me This Way"
- Julian Cope "World Shut Your Mouth"
- Culture Club – "Move Away"
- The Cure – "Boys Don't Cry (New Voice, New Mix)"
- Cutting Crew – "(I Just) Died in Your Arms"
- Chris de Burgh – "Lady in Red"
- Dexys Midnight Runners – "Because of You"
- Jim Diamond – "Hi Ho Silver"
- Anita Dobson – "Anyone Can Fall in Love"
- Doctor and The Medics – "Spirit in the Sky"
- Duran Duran – "Notorious"
- Eighth Wonder – "Stay with Me"
- Europe – "The Final Countdown"
- Falco – "Rock Me Amadeus"
- Phil Fearon – "I Can Prove It"
- Fine Young Cannibals – "Suspicious Minds"
- Five Star – "Can't Wait Another Minute"
- Samantha Fox – "Touch Me (I Want Your Body)", "Do Ya Do Ya (Wanna Please Me)"
- The Gap Band – "Big Fun"
- Boris Gardiner – "I Want to Wake Up with You"
- Sophia George – "Girlie Girlie"
- Jaki Graham – "Set Me Free"
- Haywoode – "Roses"
- The Housemartins – "Happy Hour", "Caravan of Love"
- Howard Jones -"All I Want"
- Tippa Irie – "Hello Darling"
- It Bites – "Calling All the Heroes"
- It's Immaterial – "Driving Away From Home"
- King – "Torture"
- Latin Quarter – "Radio Africa"
- Cyndi Lauper – "True Colors"
- Level 42 – "Leaving Me Now"
- Lulu – "Shout"
- Madness – "Sweetest Girl", "(Waiting For) The Ghost Train"
- Mel & Kim – "Showing Out (Get Fresh at the Weekend)"
- George Michael – "A Different Corner"
- Mike & The Mechanics – "Silent Running (On Dangerous Ground)"
- Modern Talking – "Brother Louie"
- Gary Numan – "I Can't Stop"
- Billy Ocean – "When the Going Gets Tough, the Tough Get Going"
- Pet Shop Boys – "Love Comes Quickly", "Opportunities (Let's Make Lots of Money)", "Suburbia", "West End Girls"
- Maxi Priest – "Strollin' On"
- Psychedelic Furs – "Pretty in Pink"
- The Real Roxanne ft. Hitman Howie Tee – "(Bang Zoom) Let's Go Go"
- The Real Thing – "Can't Get By Without You"
- Red Box – "For America"
- Stan Ridgway – "Camouflage"
- Feargal Sharkey – "You Little Thief"
- Shakin' Stevens – "Turning Away"
- Sigue Sigue Sputnik – "Love Missile F1-11", "21st Century Boy"
- Simply Red – "Holding Back the Years"
- Joyce Sims – "All N All"
- Sinitta – "So Macho"
- Spandau Ballet – "Fight for Ourselves", "Through the Barricades"
- Status Quo – "Red Sky"
- Swing Out Sister – "Breakout"
- Talk Talk – "Life's What You Make It"
- Timex Social Club – "Rumors"
- Kim Wilde – "You Keep Me Hangin' On" (3x)
- Wham! – "Edge of Heaven"
- Wham! – "Where Did Your Heart Go"

== 1987 ==
- ABC – "When Smokey Sings"
- Donna Allen – "Serious"
- Rick Astley – "Never Gonna Give You Up", "Whenever You Need Somebody", "When I Fall in Love"
- Bananarama – "I Heard a Rumour"
- Bee Gees – "You Win Again"
- Black – "Wonderful Life"
- The Blow Monkeys – "Out with Her"
- Boy George – "Everything I Own", "Sold"
- Glen Burtnick – "Follow You"
- The Christians – "Forgotten Town", "Ideal World"
- The Communards – "Never Can Say Goodbye"
- Randy Crawford – "Almaz"
- Curiosity Killed the Cat – "Down To Earth", "Ordinary Day", "Misfit", "Free"
- Def Leppard – "Animal"
- Erasure – "Victim of Love"
- Fine Young Cannibals – "Ever Fallen in Love (With Someone You Shouldn't've)"
- Five Star – "Stay Out of My Life", "The Slightest Touch"
- Glenn Hoddle & Chris Waddle – "Diamond Lights"
- The Housemartins – "Five Get Over Excited"
- Whitney Houston – "I Wanna Dance with Somebody (Who Loves Me)"
- Hue and Cry – "Labour of Love"
- Janet Jackson – "Let's Wait Awhile"
- Jellybean ft. Steven Dante – "The Real Thing"
- Jellybean ft. Elisa Fiorillo – "Who Found Who"
- The Jesus and Mary Chain – "April Skies"
- The Jets – "Crush on You"
- Johnny Hates Jazz – "Shattered Dreams", "Turn Back the Clock"
- Kiss – "Crazy Crazy Nights"
- Level 42 – "Running in the Family", "To Be With You Again", "It's Over"
- Johnny Logan – "Hold Me Now"
- Man 2 Man meets Man Parrish – "Male Stripper"
- Marillion – "Sugar Mice", "Incommunicado"
- Paul McCartney – "Once Upon a Long Ago"
- Mel & Kim – "Respectable"
- Mental As Anything – "Live It Up"
- Gary Moore – "Over the Hills and Far Away"
- Alison Moyet – "Is This Love?", "Love Letters"
- New Order – "True Faith"
- Alexander O'Neal – "Criticize"
- Gary Numan – "Cars (E Reg Model)"
- Ray Parker Jr. – "I Don't Think That Man Should Sleep Alone"
- Pepsi & Shirlie – "Heartache"
- Pet Shop Boys – "Always on My Mind", "It's a Sin", "Rent"
- The Pogues – "Fairytale of New York" (feat. Kirsty MacColl), "The Irish Rover" (feat. The Dubliners)
- The Proclaimers – "Letter from America"
- Iggy Pop – "Real Wild Child"
- Cliff Richard – "Some People"
- Rikki – "Only the Light"
- Scarlet Fantastic – "No Memory"
- Sherrick – "Just Call"
- Shakin' Stevens – "Come See About Me", "A Little Boogie Woogie (In the Back of My Mind)"
- Labi Siffre – "(Something Inside) So Strong"
- Sinitta – "Toy Boy"
- The Sisters of Mercy – "This Corrosion"
- Siouxsie and the Banshees – "This Wheel's on Fire"
- The Smiths – "Shoplifters of the World Unite", "Sheila Take a Bow"
- Spagna – "Call Me"
- Squeeze – "Hourglass"
- The Style Council – "Wanted"
- Donna Summer – "Dinner with Gershwin"
- Taffy – "I Love My Radio"
- T'Pau – "Heart and Soul", "China in Your Hand"
- UB40 – "Maybe Tomorrow"
- W.A.S.P. – "Scream Until You Like It"
- Wax – "Bridge to Your Heart"
- Westworld – "Sonic Boom Boy"
- Wet Wet Wet – "Sweet Little Mystery"
- Kim Wilde & Junior – "Another Step (Closer to You)"
- Vesta Williams – "Once Bitten, Twice Shy"
- Steve Winwood – "Valerie"

== 1988 ==
- The Adventures – "Broken Land"
- a-ha – "You Are the One"
- All About Eve – "Martha's Harbour" (x2), "What Kind of Fool"
- Marc Almond – "Tears Run Rings"
- Angry Anderson – "Suddenly"
- Rick Astley – "She Wants to Dance with Me", "Take Me to Your Heart"
- Aswad – "Don't Turn Around"
- Aztec Camera – "Somewhere in My Heart"
- Bananarama – "Nathan Jones", "I Want You Back"
- Beatmasters ft. P. P. Arnold – "Burn It Up"
- Robin Beck – "First Time"
- Big Country – "King of Emotion"
- Bomb the Bass – "Beat Dis"
- Billy Bragg ft. Cara Tivey – "She's Leaving Home"
- Breathe – "Hands to Heaven"
- Bros – "I Owe You Nothing", "When Will I Be Famous?", "Cat Among the Pigeons", "Silent Night"
- Brother Beyond – "The Harder I Try"
- Belinda Carlisle – "Heaven is a Place on Earth"
- Neneh Cherry – "Buffalo Stance"
- Phil Collins – "A Groovy Kind Of Love"
- The Cover Girls – "Because of You"
- Terence Trent D'Arby – "Sign Your Name"
- Deacon Blue – "Real Gone Kid"
- Hazell Dean – "Who's Leaving Who"
- Chris De Burgh – "Missing You"
- Dollar – "Oh L'amour"
- Eighth Wonder – "I'm Not Scared"
- Harry Enfield – "Loadsamoney"
- Enya – "Orinoco Flow (Sail Away)" (20 Oct, her first TOTP appearance)
- David Essex – "Gonna Make You a Star" 25 Years
- Gloria Estefan – "1-2-3"
- Everything but the Girl – "I Don't Want to Talk About It"
- Fairground Attraction – "Perfect"
- Climie Fisher – "Rise to the Occasion"
- Scott Fitzgerald – "Go"
- Four Tops – "Reach Out I'll Be There" 25 Years
- The Funky Worm – "Hustle! (To the Music...)"
- Glen Goldsmith – "Dreaming"
- Eddy Grant – "Gimme Hope Jo'anna"
- The Hollies – "He Ain't Heavy, He's My Brother"
- Hothouse Flowers – "Don't Go"
- Engelbert Humperdinck – "Release Me" 25 Years
- Mud – "Tiger Feet" 25 Years
- David Essex – "Gonna Make You a Star" 25 Years
- Tom Jones & the Art of Noise – "Kiss"
- Level 42 – "Heaven in My Hands"
- Lulu – "Shout" 25 Years
- Glenn Medeiros – "Nothing's Gonna Change My Love for You"
- Kylie Minogue – "Especially for You" (with Jason Donovan), "The Loco-Motion", "Je Ne Sais Pas Pourquoi"
- Morrissey – "Everyday Is Like Sunday"
- Milli Vanilli – "Girl You Know It's True"
- Mud – "Tiger Feet" 25 Years
- Narada – "Divine Emotions"
- New Order – "Fine Time"
- Vanessa Paradis – "Joe le taxi" x2
- Pebbles – "Girlfriend"
- Pet Shop Boys – "Domino Dancing", "Left to My Own Devices", "Heart", "Always On My Mind"
- Prefab Sprout – "The King of Rock 'N' Roll"
- R.E.M. – "Orange Crush"
- Cliff Richard – "We Don't Talk Anymore" 25 Years, "Mistletoe and Wine"
- Sabrina – "Boys (Summertime Love)"
- Taja Sevelle – "Love Is Contagious"
- S'Express – "Theme from S'Express"
- Shakin' Stevens – "Feel the Need in Me", "This Ole House" 25 Years
- Siouxsie and the Banshees – "Peek-a-Boo"
- Soul II Soul feat. Caron Wheeler – "Keep On Movin'"
- Spagna – "Every Girl & Boy"
- Status Quo – "Rockin' All Over the World" 25 Years, "Burning Bridges"
- The Stranglers – "All Day and All of the Night"
- The Swinging Blue Jeans – "Hippy Hippy Shake" 25 Years
- Tiffany – "I Think We're Alone Now"
- Tanita Tikaram – "Good Tradition"
- The Timelords – "Doctorin' the Tardis"
- Transvision Vamp – "I Want Your Love"
- The Tremeloes – "Silence Is Golden" 25 Years
- Two Men, a Drum Machine and a Trumpet – "Tired of Getting Pushed Around"
- UB40 feat. Chrissie Hynde – "Breakfast in Bed"
- Voice of the Beehive – "Don't Call Me Baby"
- Wee Papa Girl Rappers – "Wee Rule"
- Wet Wet Wet – "Angel Eyes (Home and Away)", "With a Little Help from My Friends"
- Jane Wiedlin – "Rush Hour"
- Kim Wilde – "You Came", "Never Trust a Stranger", "Four Letter Word"
- Bill Withers – "Lovely Day"
- Womack & Womack – "Teardrops"
- Yazz – "Doctorin' the House" (with Coldcut), "The Only Way Is Up" (with The Plastic Population), "Stand Up for Your Love Rights "

== 1989 ==
- Marc Almond & Gene Pitney – "Something's Gotten Hold of My Heart"
- The Beautiful South – "Song for Whoever"
- Bananarama – "Love, Truth and Honesty"
- Big Fun – "Blame It on the Boogie", "Can't Shake the Feeling"
- Black Box – "Ride On Time"
- Boy Meets Girl – "Waiting for a Star to Fall"
- Brother Beyond – "Can You Keep a Secret?"
- Neneh Cherry – "Manchild"
- Coldcut ft. Lisa Stansfield – "People Hold On"
- Phil Collins – "Another Day in Paradise", "In the Air Tonight" (Was a hit for Collins in January 1981)
- The Cult – "Fire Woman"
- The Cure – "Lullaby"
- Curiosity Killed the Cat – "Name and Number"
- D Mob feat. Cathy Dennis – "C'mon and Get My Love"
- Def Leppard – "Rocket"
- Jason Donovan – "Every Day (I Love You More)", "Too Many Broken Hearts"
- Double Trouble & Rebel MC – "Just Keep Rockin'"
- Edelweiss – "Bring Me Edelweiss"
- Sheena Easton – "The Lover in Me"
- Electronic – "Getting Away With It"
- David Essex – "A Winter's Tale" (Was a hit for Essex in December 1982)
- Gloria Estefan – "Can't Stay Away from You"
- Fine Young Cannibals – "She Drives Me Crazy", "I'm Not the Man I Used to Be"
- Samantha Fox – "I Only Wanna Be With You"
- Debbie Gibson – "Electric Youth"
- Lynne Hamilton – "On the Inside"
- Happy Mondays – "Hallelujah"
- Deborah Harry – "I Want That Man"
- Holly Johnson – "Love Train", "Americanos", "Atomic City"
- Robert Howard & Kym Mazelle – "Wait"
- Guru Josh – "Infinity"
- Janet Jackson – "Rhythm Nation"
- Kaoma – "Lambada"
- Chaka Khan – "Ain't Nobody"
- Live Report – "Why Do I Always Get It Wrong?"
- Living in a Box – "Blow the House Down", "Gatecrashing", "Room in Your Heart"
- London Boys – "Requiem"
- Martika – "Toy Soldiers", "I Feel the Earth Move"
- Kirsty MacColl – "Days"
- Liza Minnelli – "Losing My Mind"
- Kylie Minogue – "Hand on Your Heart", "Wouldn't Change a Thing", "Never Too Late"
- Mike + The Mechanics – "The Living Years"
- Morrissey – "The Last of the Famous International Playboys"
- New Order – "Fine Time"
- New Order – "Round & Round"
- Stevie Nicks – "Rooms on Fire"
- Mica Paris & Will Downing – "Where Is the Love?"
- Chris Rea – "The Road to Hell"
- Reynolds Girls – "I'd Rather Jack"
- Cliff Richard – "Lean on You"
- Roachford – "Cuddly Toy"
- Linda Ronstadt feat. Aaron Neville – "Don't Know Much"
- Roxette – "The Look"
- Shakespears Sister – "You're History"
- Shakin' Stevens – "Love Attack", "This Ole House" (Was a hit for Shaky in March 1981)
- Simply Red – "It's Only Love", "If You Don't Know Me by Now"
- Sinitta – "Right Back Where We Started From"
- Jimmy Somerville & June Miles-Kingston – "Comment te dire adieu?"
- Sonia – "You'll Never Stop Me Loving You", "Can't Forget You", "Listen to Your Heart"
- Dusty Springfield – "Nothing Has Been Proved"
- Lisa Stansfield – "All Around the World"
- The Stone Roses – "Fools Gold"
- Donna Summer – "This Time I Know It's For Real"
- Texas – "I Don't Want a Lover"
- The The – "The Beat(en) Generation"
- Transvision Vamp – "Baby I Don't Care", "The Only One", "Landslide of Love"
- Tina Turner – "The Best", "I Don't Wanna Lose You"
- Wet Wet Wet – "Broke Away"
- Kim Wilde – "Love in the Natural Way", "You Keep Me Hangin' On" (Was a hit for Kim in October 1986)
- Yazz – "Where Has All the Love Gone"

== 1990 ==
- Adamski ft. Seal – "Killer"
- a-ha – "Crying in the Rain"
- Kim Appleby – "Don't Worry"
- Bassomatic – "Fascinating Rhythm"
- The Beautiful South – "A Little Time"
- The Beloved – "Hello"
- Black Box – "I Don't Know Anybody Else", "Fantasy"
- Blue Pearl – "Naked in the Rain"
- Candy Flip – "Strawberry Fields Forever"
- Guru Josh – "Infinity"
- Neneh Cherry – "I've Got You Under My Skin"
- Phil Collins – "I Wish It Would Rain Down"
- Julee Cruise – "Falling"
- The Charlatans (UK band) – "Then"
- The Cure – "Pictures of You"
- Del Amitri – "Nothing Ever Happens"
- Jason Donovan – "Another Night", "Hang On to Your Love", "I'm Doing Fine", "Rhythm of the Rain"
- Emma – "Give a Little Love Back to the World"
- En Vogue – "Hold On"
- The Farm – "All Together Now", "Groovy Train"
- FPI Project – "Rich in Paradise"
- Go West – "King of Wishful Thinking"
- Happy Mondays – "Step On", "Kinky Afro"
- The House of Love – "Shine On"
- Inspiral Carpets – "This Is How It Feels", "She Comes in the Fall", "Biggest Mountain"
- Chris Isaak – "Wicked Game"
- Jam Tronik – "Another Day in Paradise"
- Jesus Jones – "Real Real Real"
- Elton John – "Sacrifice"
- The KLF – "What Time Is Love?"
- The La's – "There She Goes"
- Lindy Layton feat. Janet Kay – "Silly Games"
- Londonbeat – "I've Been Thinking About You"
- Timmy Mallett & Bombalurina – "Itsy Bitsy Teenie Weenie Yellow Polka Dot Bikini"
- MC Tunes vs 808 State – "Tunes Splits The Atom"
- Maria McKee – "Show Me Heaven"
- Craig McLachlan – "Mona"
- Kylie Minogue – "Better the Devil You Know", "Step Back in Time"
- Morrissey – "November Spawned a Monster"
- Sinéad O'Connor – "Nothing Compares 2 U"
- Orbital – "Chime"
- Pat & Mick – "Use It Up & Wear It Out"
- Pop Will Eat Itself – "Touched by the Hand of Cicciolina"
- Pet Shop Boys – "Being Boring", "So Hard"
- Primal Scream – "Loaded"
- The Quireboys – "Hey You"
- Cliff Richard – "Saviour's Day"
- Roxette – "It Must Have Been Love", Listen to Your Heart", "Dressed for Success"
- Snap! – "The Power", "Cult of Snap"
- Sonia – "Listen to Your Heart", "End of the World"
- The Divinyls – "I Touch Myself"
- The Soup Dragons – "I'm Free"
- The Stranglers – "96 Tears"
- Technotronic – "Get Up! (Before the Night Is Over)" (feat. Ya Kid K), "This Beat Is Technotronic" (feat. MC Eric)
- Tongue 'n' Cheek – "Tomorrow"
- Tina Turner – "Steamy Windows"
- Twenty 4 Seven feat. Captain Hollywood – "I Can't Stand It" x2, "Are You Dreaming"
- Unique 3 – "Musical Melody"
- Vanilla Ice – "Ice Ice Baby"
- The Wedding Present – "Brassneck", "Make Me Smile (Come Up and See Me)"
- Yell! – "Instant Replay"
- Chad Jackson – "Hear the Drummer (Get Wicked)"

== 1991 ==
- 3rd Bass – "Pop Goes the Weasel"
- Bryan Adams – "(Everything I Do) I Do It For You"
- Oleta Adams – "Get Here"
- All About Eve – "Farewell Mr. Sorrow"
- Marc Almond – "The Days of Pearly Spencer"
- Altern-8 – "Activ-8"
- Kim Appleby – "G.L.A.D"
- Bizarre Inc – "Playing with Knives"
- Black Box – "Strike It Up"
- Blur – "There's No Other Way", "Bang"
- Bomb the Bass – "Winter in July"
- Mariah Carey – "Emotions", "Can't Let Go"
- Belinda Carlisle – "Do You Feel Like I Feel?"
- Cher – "Love and Understanding"
- Gary Clail – "Human Nature"
- Cola Boy – "7 Ways to Love"
- Color Me Badd – "I Wanna Sex You Up", "All 4 Love"
- Congress feat. Lucinda Sieger – "40 Miles"
- Beverley Craven – "Holding On"
- Crowded House – "Fall at Your Feet"
- Crystal Waters – "Gypsy Woman (She's Homeless)"
- Deacon Blue – "Your Swaying Arms", "Twist and Shout"
- De La Soul – "A Roller Skating Jam Named "Saturdays""
- Deee-Lite – "Groove is in the Heart"
- Cathy Dennis – "Touch Me (All Night Long)"
- Divinyls – "I Touch Myself"
- 808 State – "Cubik", "In Yer Face"
- Electronic – "Get the Message"
- EMF – "I Believe", "Children"
- Erasure – "Love to Hate You"
- The Future Sound of London – "Papua New Guinea"
- Genesis – "No Son Of Mine"
- Amy Grant – "Baby Baby"
- Hale and Pace – "The Stonk"
- Happy Mondays – "Loose Fit"
- Chesney Hawkes – "The One and Only"
- Human Resource – "Dominator"
- Inspiral Carpets – "Caravan"
- Samantha Janus – "A Message to Your Heart"
- Jesus Jones – "International Bright Young Thing", "Who? Where? Why?"
- Jesus Loves You – "Bow Down Mister", "Generations of Love"
- K-Klass – "Rhythm Is a Mystery"
- The KLF – "(Stand by The JAMs)" (feat. Tammy Wynette), "3 a.m. Eternal", "Last Train to Trancentral"
- Sophie Lawrence – "Love's Unkind"
- Sonia – "Only Fools (Never Fall in Love)", "Be Young, Be Foolish, Be Happy"
- LaTour – "People Are Still Having Sex"
- Level 42 – "Guaranteed"
- Love Decade – "So Real"
- M People – "How Can I Love You More?"
- Kirsty MacColl – "Walking Down Madison"
- Marillion – "Cover My Eyes"
- Marky Mark and the Funky Bunch – "Good Vibrations"
- Massive Attack – "Unfinished Sympathy", "Safe from Harm"
- Don McLean – "American Pie"
- Mike + The Mechanics – "Word of Mouth"
- Dannii Minogue – "Love and Kisses", "$uccess", "Jump to the Beat", "Baby Love"
- Kylie Minogue – "Word Is Out", "Shocked"
- Moby – "Go"
- Monty Python (Eric Idle) – "Always Look on the Bright Side of Life"
- Morrissey – "My Love Life"
- Ned's Atomic Dustbin – "Happy"
- Nirvana – "Smells Like Teen Spirit"
- N-Joi – "Adrenalin", "Anthem"
- Nomad – "(I Wanna Give You) Devotion", "Just a Groove"
- Northside – "Take 5"
- Oceanic – "Insanity"
- Orchestral Manoeuvres in the Dark – "Sailing on the Seven Seas"
- Praise – "Only You"
- Pop Will Eat Itself – "X, Y, & Zee", "92 Degrees"
- Quartz & Dina Carroll – "It's Too Late"
- The Railway Children – "Every Beat of the Heart"
- Vic Reeves – "Born Free"
- Vic Reeves and The Wonder Stuff – "Dizzy"
- Right Said Fred – "I'm Too Sexy"
- Diana Ross – "When You Tell Me That You Love Me"
- Cliff Richard – "We Should Be Together"
- Ride – "Unfamiliar"
- Roxette – "Joyride"
- Rozalla – "Everybody's Free (To Feel Good)", "Faith (In the Power of Love)"
- Scorpions – "Send Me an Angel"
- Seal – "Crazy"
- Shaft – "Roobarb and Custard"
- The Shamen – "Move Any Mountain (Progen '91)"
- Feargal Sharkey – "I've Got News for You"
- Simply Red – "Stars"
- Siouxsie and the Banshees – "Kiss Them for Me"
- Slade – "Radio Wall of Sound"
- SL2 – "DJs Take Control"
- Soho – "Hippychick"
- Lisa Stansfield – "All Woman"
- Kenny Thomas – "Outstanding", "Thinking About Your Love"
- T'pau – "Whenever You Need Me"
- Tina Turner – "Way of the World"
- Tin Machine – "You Belong in Rock n' Roll", "Baby Universal"
- 2 Unlimited – "Get Ready for This" x3
- U96 – "Das Boot"
- Utah Saints – "What Can You Do for Me"
- Voice of the Beehive – "Monsters & Angels"
- Wet Wet Wet – "Goodnight Girl"
- The Wonder Stuff – "The Size of a Cow"
- Xpansions – "Move Your Body"
- Young Black Teenagers – "Loud and Hard to Hit"
- Young Disciples – "Apparently Nothin'"
- Zoë – "Sunshine on a Rainy Day", "Lightning"
- Zucchero and Paul Young – "Senza una Donna (Without a Woman)"

== 1992 ==
- Ambassadors of Funk ft. MC Mario – "Supermarioland"
- Tori Amos -"Crucify"
- Tasmin Archer – "Sleeping Satellite"
- Michael Ball – "One Step Out of Time"
- Bizarre Inc ft. Angie Brown – "I'm Gonna Get You"
- Michael Bolton – "To Love Somebody"
- Bon Jovi – "Keep the Faith"
- Boney M. – "Megamix"
- Betty Boo – "Let Me Take You There"
- Boy George – "The Crying Game"
- Boyz II Men – "End of the Road"
- Mariah Carey – "I'll Be There"
- Carter USM – "The Impossible Dream"
- Charles & Eddie – "Would I Lie to You?"
- Cher – "Could've Been You"
- Cliff Richard – "This New Year"
- Color Me Badd – "Heartbreaker"
- Crowded House – "Weather with You", "It's Only Natural"
- Billy Ray Cyrus – "Achy Breaky Heart"
- Def Leppard – "Let's Get Rocked", "Make Love Like a Man"
- Del Amitri – "Always the Last to Know"
- Celine Dion & Peabo Bryson – "Beauty and the Beast"
- Doctor Spin – "Tetris"
- Dr. Alban – "It's My Life"
- Electronic – "Disappointed"
- En Vogue – "Free Your Mind"
- Enya – "Book of Days"
- Erasure – "Breath of Life", "Take a Chance on Me"
- Felix – "Don't You Want Me"
- Genesis – "Hold on My Heart", "Invisible Touch (Live)"
- Isotonik – "Different Strokes"
- Sophie B. Hawkins – "Damn I Wish I Was Your Lover"
- Heaven 17 – "Temptation"
- INXS – "Taste It"
- Elton John & Eric Clapton – "Runaway Train"
- Kris Kross – "Jump"
- KWS – "Please Don't Go"
- Cyndi Lauper – "The World Is Stone"
- M People – "Excited"
- MC Hammer – "Addams Groove"
- Madness – "The Harder They Come"
- Manic Street Preachers – "Motorcycle Emptiness", "You Love Us", "Suicide Is Painless"
- Brian May – "Resurrection"
- Kylie Minogue – "Give Me Just a Little More Time", "Finer Feelings", "What Kind of Fool (Heard All That Before)", "Celebration"
- Morrissey – "We Hate It When Our Friends Become Successful"
- Jimmy Nail – "Ain't No Doubt"
- Ned's Atomic Dustbin – "Not Sleeping Around"
- New Atlantic – "I Know"
- Opus III – "It's a Fine Day"
- Vanessa Paradis – "Be My Baby"
- The Pasadenas – "I'm Doin' Fine Now"
- The Pogues & Kirsty MacColl – "Fairytale of New York"
- Public Enemy – "Shut 'Em Down"
- Cliff Richard – "This New Year"
- Ride – "Leave Them All Behind"
- Right Said Fred – "Don't Talk Just Kiss", "Deeply Dippy"
- Roxette – "How Do You Do!", "Church of Your Heart"
- Saint Etienne – "Join Our Club"
- Jon Secada – "Just Another Day"
- The Sisters of Mercy – "Temple of Love"
- Shakespears Sister – "Stay", "I Don't Care"
- The Shamen – "Ebeneezer Goode"
- Sir Mix-a-Lot – "Baby Got Back"
- SL2 – "On a Ragga Tip"
- Smart E's – "Sesame's Treet"
- Lisa Stansfield – "Someday (I'm Coming Back)"
- Stereo MC's – "Connected"
- Rod Stewart – "Tom Traubert's Blues"
- Suede – "Metal Mickey"
- The Sugarcubes – "Hit"
- Take That – "It Only Takes a Minute", "I Found Heaven", "A Million Love Songs", "Could It Be Magic"
- 2 Unlimited – "Twilight Zone" x2, "Workaholic", "The Magic Friend"
- U2 – "One"
- Undercover – "Baker Street"
- Urban Hype – "Trip to Trumpton"
- Utah Saints – "Something Good"
- The Wedding Present – "Blue Eyes", "Flying Saucer", "Three"
- Kim Wilde – "Love Is Holy"
- The Wonder Stuff – "Welcome to the Cheap Seats"
- Chris De Burgh – "Separate Tables"

== 1993 ==
- Ace of Base – "All That She Wants", "Wheel of Fortune"
- Aftershock – "Slave to the Vibe"
- a-ha – "Dark Is the Night for All"
- Bee Gees – "For Whom the Bells Toll"
- Björk – "Venus as a Boy", "Big Time Sensuality" (live from Rennes)
- The Bluebells – "Young at Heart"
- Cappella – "U Got 2 Let the Music"
- Captain Hollywood Project – "More and More"
- Mariah Carey – "Dreamlover"
- Belinda Carlisle – "Big Scary Animal", "Lay Down Your Arms"
- Dina Carroll – "Don't Be a Stranger", "The Perfect Year"
- Phil Collins – "Both Sides of the Story"
- Crowded House – "Distant Sun", "Nails In My Feet"
- Culture Beat – "Mr. Vain"
- Def Leppard – "Heaven Is"
- Celine Dion – "The Power of Love"
- Dr. Alban – "Sing Hallelujah"
- D:Ream – "U R the Best Thing"
- Duran Duran – "Ordinary World"
- East 17 – "Deep", "Slow It Down", "West End Girls", "It's Alright"
- Eternal – "Stay"
- E.Y.C. – "Feelin' Alright"
- Bryan Ferry – "I Put a Spell on You"
- The Frank and Walters – "After All"
- 4 Non Blondes – "What's Up"
- Gabrielle – "Dreams"
- Go West – "The Tracks of My Tears"
- Haddaway – "What Is Love", "Life", "I Miss You"
- Deborah Harry – "I Can See Clearly"
- Inner Circle – "Sweat (A La La La La Long)"
- Janet Jackson – "That's the Way Love Goes"
- [[Jade (group

)|Jade]] – "Don't Walk Away"

- James – "Sometimes (Lester Piggott)"
- Jamiroquai – "Too Young to Die", "Blow Your Mind"
- Elton John and Kiki Dee – "True Love"
- Lenny Kravitz – "Are You Gonna Go My Way"
- k.d. lang – "Constant Craving"
- Joey Lawrence – "Nothin' My Love Can't Fix"
- M People – "How Can I Love You More?" (remixed), "One Night in Heaven" x2, "Moving on Up" x2, "Don't Look Any Further"
- Manic Street Preachers – "Roses in the Hospital", "La Tristesse Durera (Scream to a Sigh)"
- Brian May and Cozy Powell – "Resurrection"
- Meat Loaf – "I'd Do Anything For Love (But I Won't Do That)"
- New Order – "Regret", "Ruined in a Day", "World (The Price of Love)"
- Gary Numan – "Cars (Sprint Mix)"
- Oui 3 – "Break From The Old Routine"
- Pet Shop Boys – "Can You Forgive Her?"
- P.M. Dawn and Boy George- "More Than Likely"
- Cliff Richard – "Peace in Our Time", "Healing Love"
- Robert Plant – "29 Palms"
- Radiohead – "Creep"
- Shabba Ranks – "Mr. Loverman"
- Robin S. – "Show Me Love"
- Sade – "No Ordinary Love"
- Saint Etienne – "You're in a Bad Way"
- The Sisters of Mercy and Terri Nunn – "Under the Gun"
- Snap! & Niki Haris – "Exterminate", "Do You See the Light (Looking For)"
- Snow – "Informer"
- Sonia – "Better the Devil You Know"
- Bruce Springsteen – "Lucky Town"
- Sting – "If I Ever Lose My Faith in You", "Fields of Gold"
- Sub Sub feat. Melanie Williams – "Ain't No Love (Ain't No Use)"
- Suede – "So Young"
- Sunscreem – "Love U More"
- Sybil – "The Love I Lost" (with West End), "When I'm Good and Ready"
- Take That – "Pray", "Relight My Fire", "Babe"
- Therapy? – "Screamager"
- The S.O.U.L. S.Y.S.T.E.M. – Lovely Day
- The Time Frequency – "The Ultimate High", "Real Love '93"
- Tina Turner – "I Don't Wanna Fight"
- UB40 – "Higher Ground"
- 2 Unlimited – "No Limit" 4x, "Tribal Dance", "Faces", "Maximum Overdrive"
- Kim Wilde – "If I Can't Have You"
- The Wonder Stuff – "On the Ropes", "Full Of Life (Happy Now)"
- Yazz & Aswad – "How Long"

== 1994 ==
- Ace of Base – "Don't Turn Around", "The Sign"
- Tori Amos – "Cornflake Girl", "Pretty Good Year"
- Tina Arena – "Chains"
- Pato Banton – "Baby Come Back"
- Berri – "Sunshine After the Rain"
- Big Mountain – "Baby, I Love Your Way"
- Björk – "Violently Happy"
- Blur – "To the End", "Parklife", "End of a Century"
- Bon Jovi – "Always"
- Brand New Heavies – "Back to Love"
- Toni Braxton – "Breathe Again", "Another Sad Love Song", "Love Shoulda Brought You Home"
- Naomi Campbell – "Love and Tears"
- Cappella – "Move on Baby", "U & Me"
- Mariah Carey – "Anytime You Need a Friend", "Without You", "Endless Love" (with Luther Vandross)
- Carter USM – "Let's Get Tattoos"
- China Black – "Searching", "Stars"
- Kate Bush – "And So Is Love"
- Alice Cooper – "Lost in America"
- Julian Cope – "I Gotta Walk"
- Corona – "The Rhythm of the Night"
- Elvis Costello – "Sulky Girl"
- The Cranberries – "Linger", "Dreams"
- Culture Beat – "Anything", "World in Your Hands"
- Bruce Dickinson – "Tears of the Dragon"
- Doop – "Doop"
- D:Ream – "Things Can Only Get Better"
- East 17 – "Around the World", "Steam", "Stay Another Day", "Let It Rain"
- Eternal – "Save Our Love", "Just a Step from Heaven", "So Good", "Oh Baby I...", "Crazy"
- E.Y.C. – "The Way You Work It", "Black Book", "One More Chance"
- Michelle Gayle – "Sweetness"
- General Levy & M Beat – "Incredible"
- Gary Glitter – "I'm the Leader of the Gang (I Am)"
- Gloworm – "Carry Me Home"
- Green Day – "Welcome to Paradise"
- The Grid – "Swamp Thing"
- Haddaway – "Rock My Heart"
- Sophie B. Hawkins – "Right Beside You"
- House of Pain – "On Point"
- Jamiroquai – "Half the Man"
- Killing Joke – "Pandemonium"
- Cyndi Lauper – "Hey Now (Girls Just Want to Have Fun)"
- Let Loose – "Seventeen", "Crazy for You"
- C.J. Lewis – "Sweets for My Sweet"
- Lisa Loeb – "Stay (I Missed You)"
- M People – "Renaissance", "Sight for Sore Eyes"
- Manic Street Preachers – "Faster"
- Shane MacGowan and The Popes – "That Woman's Got Me Drinking" (feat. Johnny Depp), "Haunted" (feat. Sinéad O'Connor)
- Maxx – "Get-A-Way"
- Meat Loaf – "Objects in the Rear View Mirror May Appear Closer than They Are"
- Kylie Minogue – "Confide in Me"
- The Mission – "Tower of Strength"
- Morrissey – "The More You Ignore Me, the Closer I Get"
- Wendy Moten – "Come In Out of the Rain"
- Oasis – "Live Forever", "Rock 'n' Roll Star", "Shakermaker", "Whatever"
- Sinéad O'Connor – "Thank You for Hearing Me"
- Dawn Penn – "You Don't Love Me (No, No, No)"
- The Pretenders – "I'll Stand By You"
- Pulp – "Babies"
- Red Dragon with Brian and Tony Gold – "Compliments on Your Kiss"
- Ride – "Birdman"
- Roxette – "Sleeping in My Car"
- Rozalla – "I Love Music"
- Frances Ruffelle – "Lonely Symphony (We Will Be Free)"
- Saint Etienne – "Pale Movie"
- Salt-n-Pepa feat. En Vogue – "Whatta Man"
- Shampoo – "Trouble"
- Shed Seven – "Speakeasy"
- Snap! ft. Summer – "Welcome to Tomorrow (Are You Ready?)"
- Soundgarden – "Black Hole Sun"
- Bruce Springsteen – "Streets of Philadelphia"
- Suede – "Stay Together", We Are the Pigs
- Donna Summer – "Melody of Love (Wanna Be Loved)"
- Take That – "Everything Changes" "Love Ain't Here Anymore" "Sure"
- 2 Cowboys – "Everybody Gonfi-Gon"
- 2 Unlimited – "Let the Beat Control Your Body" x2, "The Real Thing", "No One" x2
- Wet Wet Wet – "Love Is All Around"
- The Wildhearts – "Caffeine Bomb"
- Whigfield – "Saturday Night"

== 1995 ==
- Ace of Base – "Lucky Love"
- Alex Party – "Don't Give Me Your Life"
- Blur – "Country House"
- Björk " "Army of Me", "Army of Me" (with Skunk Anansie), "Isobel" (live from New York), "Isobel", "It's Oh So Quiet" (twice)
- Bon Jovi – "Lie to Me", "Something for the Pain", "Someday I'll Be Saturday Night"
- The Boo Radleys – "It's Lulu", "Wake Up Boo!"
- Mariah Carey – "Fantasy", "One Sweet Day" (Feat. Boyz II Men)
- Nick Cave and the Bad Seeds with Kylie Minogue – "Where the Wild Roses Grow"
- Cher – "Walking in Memphis"
- Childliners – "Gift of Christmas"
- Terence Trent D'Arby – "Holding On to You"
- Dana Dawson – "3 Is Family"
- Des'ree – "You Gotta Be"
- Celine Dion – "Only One Road"
- Duran Duran – "Perfect Day"
- Elastica – "Waking Up"
- Nicki French – "Total Eclipse of the Heart"
- Garbage – "Only Happy When It Rains", "Queer"
- The Go-Go's – "The Whole World Lost Its Head"
- Grace – "Not Over Yet"
- Green Day " "Basket Case"
- PJ Harvey – "C'mon Billy"
- The Human League – "Tell Me When"
- Jam & Spoon feat. Plavka – "Right in the Night"
- Jamiroquai – "Stillness in Time"
- Joshua Kadison – "Jessie"
- Annie Lennox – "No More I Love You's"
- Love City Groove – "Love City Groove"
- Madonna – "You'll See"
- Massive Attack feat. Tracey Thorn – "Protection"
- Robert Miles – "Children"
- MN8 – "I've Got a Little Something for You", "If You Only Let Me In", "Happy", "Baby It's You", "Pathway to the Moon"
- M People – "Open Your Heart", "Search for the Hero", "Itchycoo Park"
- Perfecto Allstars – "Reach Up (Papa's Got A Brand New Pig Bag)"
- Iggy Pop – "Beside You"
- Pulp – "Common People", "Mis-Shapes", "Sorted for E's & Wizz"
- Oasis – "Roll with It", "Some Might Say", "Wonderwall"
- Ramones – "I Don't Wanna Grow Up"
- Scarlet – "Independent Love Song"
- Saint Etienne feat. Étienne Daho – "He's on the Phone"
- Suggs – "Camden Town", "I'm Only Sleeping"
- Take That – "Back for Good", "Never Forget"
- Tina Turner – "GoldenEye"
- 2 Unlimited – "Do What's Good for Me"
- Luther Vandross – "Always and Forever"
- Bill Whelan – "Riverdance"
- Vanessa-Mae – "Toccata and Fugue in D Minor"
- Scatman John – "Scatman (Ski-Ba-Bop-Ba-Dop-Bop)"
- Whigfield – "Close to You"
- TLC – "Creep", "Waterfalls", "Diggin' on You"
- UB40 – "Until My Dying Day"

== 1996 ==
- 3T – "Gotta Be You"
- Tori Amos – "Caught a Lite Sneeze"
- Peter André ft. Bubbler Ranx – "Mysterious Girl"
- Ash – "Oh Yeah"
- Babylon Zoo – "Spaceman"
- Backstreet Boys – "Get Down (You're the One for Me)", "We've Got It Goin' On", "I'll Never Break Your Heart"
- Gary Barlow – "Forever Love"
- Bis – "Kandy Pop"
- Björk – "Possibly Maybe"
- Blur – "Stereotypes"
- Bon Jovi – "Hey God"
- David Bowie & Pet Shop Boys – "Hallo Spaceboy"
- Boyzone – "A Different Beat"
- Toni Braxton – "You're Makin' Me High", "Unbreak My Heart"
- BT – "Loving You More"
- Mariah Carey – "Open Arms"
- Cher – "One by One", "The Sun Ain't Gonna Shine (Anymore)"
- Phil Collins – "Dance into the Light", "It's in Your Eyes"
- Crowded House – "Instinct"
- The Cure – "The 13th"
- Def Leppard – "Slang"
- Donna Lewis – "I Love You Always Forever"
- Dubstar – "Stars", "Not So Manic Now"
- Dunblane – "Knockin' on Heaven's Door"
- Eternal – "Secrets"
- Fugees – "Killing Me Softly"
- Garbage – "Milk", "Stupid Girl"
- Gina G – "Ooh Aah... Just a Little Bit", "I Belong to You", "Fresh!"
- Los Del Rio – "Macarena"
- Jamiroquai – "Virtual Insanity"
- Kadoc – "The Nighttrain"
- Kula Shaker – "Hey Dude"
- Louise – "In Walked Love", "Naked", "Undivided Love", "One Kiss from Heaven"
- Manic Street Preachers – "A Design for Life", "Australia", "Everything Must Go", "Kevin Carter"
- Menswear – "Being Brave"
- MN8 – "Tuff Act to Follow", "Dreaming"
- No Way Sis – "I'd Like to Teach the World to Sing"
- Gary Numan – "Cars (Premier Mix)"
- Oasis – "Cum on Feel the Noize", "Don't Look Back in Anger"
- Ocean Colour Scene – "The Riverboat Song"
- OMC – "How Bizarre"
- Mark Owen – "Child"
- Pianoman – "Blurred"
- Power Station – "She Can Rock It"
- Pulp – "Something Changed"
- QFX – "Everytime You Touch Me"
- Sasha & Maria – "Be As One"
- Sex Pistols – "New York", "Pretty Vacant"
- Shed Seven – "Chasing Rainbows"
- Sleeper – "Statuesque"
- Spice Girls – "Say You'll Be There", "2 Become 1", "Wannabe"
- Suede – "Trash"
- Suggs – "Cecilia"
- SWV – "You're the One"
- Take That – "How Deep Is Your Love"
- Technohead – "I Wanna Be a Hippy"
- Tina Turner – "Whatever You Want", "On Silent Wings"
- Way Out West – "The Gift"

== 1997 ==
- 3 Colours Red – "Sixty Mile Smile"
- 3T – "Gotta Be You"
- 5ive – "Slam Dunk (Da Funk)"
- 911 – "The Day We Find Love", "Bodyshakin'", "The Journey", "Party People...Friday Night"
- Aerosmith – "Falling in Love (Is Hard on the Knees)
- Alisha's Attic – "Air We Breathe"
- All Saints – "I Know Where It's At", "Never Ever"
- Amen! UK – "Passion"
- Ant & Dec – "Shout"
- Apollo 440 – "Ain't Talkin' 'bout Dub"
- Aqua – "Barbie Girl"
- Ash – "A Life Less Ordinary"
- Babyface – "Every Time I Close My Eyes"
- Backstreet Boys – "Quit Playing Games (with My Heart)", "As Long as You Love Me"
- The Beautiful South – "Blackbird on the Wire"
- Beck – "The New Pollution"
- Bee Gees – "Alone"
- Bellini – "Samba de Janeiro"
- Björk – "Jóga"
- Blackstreet – "Don't Leave Me"
- Blur – "Beetlebum", "On Your Own", "M.O.R."
- Boyzone – "Isn't It a Wonder", "Picture of You", "Baby Can I Hold You"
- The Brand New Heavies – "Sometimes, "You Are the Universe", "You've Got a Friend"
- Toni Braxton – "How Could an Angel Break My Heart"
- Brownstone – "5 Miles to Empty"
- Bryan Adams – "18 till I Die", "Back to You"
- Byron Stingily – "Get Up (Everybody)"
- Bush – "Swallowed"
- Cast – "Free Me", "Guiding Star" "Live the Dream"
- Catch – "Bingo"
- Cathy Dennis – "Waterloo Sunset"
- Celine Dion – "The Reason"
- Changing Faces – "G.H.E.T.T.O.U.T."
- The Charlatans – ""North Country Boy", "How High", "Tellin' Stories"
- Chicken Shed Theatre Company – "I Am in Love with the World"
- Chumbawamba – "Tubthumping"
- Clock – "U Sexy Thing"
- Coolio – "C U When U Get There" (feat. 40 Thevz), "Ooh La La"
- Damage – "Wonderful Tonight"
- Dannii Minogue – "All I Wanna Do", "Everything I Wanted"
- Dario G – "Sunchyme"
- David Bowie – "Dead Man Walking"
- Del Amitri – "Not Where It's At"
- Depeche Mode – "Barrel of a Gun", "It's No Good"
- The Divine Comedy – "Everybody Knows (Except You)"
- DJ Kool – "Let Me Clear My Throat"
- DJ Quicksilver – "Bellissima"
- Dodgy – "Found You"
- Double 99 – "RipGroove"
- Dubstar – "No More Talk"
- D:Ream – "Things Can Only Get Better"
- East 17 – "Hey Child"
- Echo & the Bunnymen – "Nothing Lasts Forever"
- Eels – "Novocaine for the Soul"
- Elton John – "Something About the Way You Look Tonight"/"Candle in the Wind '97"
- Embrace – "All You Good Good People"
- En Vogue – "Whatever"
- Erasure – "Don't Say Your Love Is Killing Me"
- Eternal – "Don't You Love Me?", "I Wanna Be the Only One" (feat. BeBe Winans), "Angel of Mine"
- Faith No More – "Ashes to Ashes"
- Finley Quaye – "Even After All"
- Funky Green Dogs – "Fired Up!"
- Fun Lovin' Criminals – "Scooby Snacks"
- Gabrielle – "Walk On By"
- Gala – "Freed from Desire", "Let a Boy Cry"
- Gary Barlow – "Love Won't Wait", "Open Road"
- Gina G – "Fresh!", "Ti Amo"
- Ginuwine – "Pony"
- Hanson – "MMMBop", "Where's the Love"
- Hot Chocolate – "You Sexy Thing"
- INXS – "Elegantly Wasted"
- James – "She's a Star"
- Jamiroquai – "Do U Know Where You're Coming From"
- Janet Jackson – "Got 'til It's Gone" (feat. Q-Tip and Joni Mitchell), "Together Again"
- Katrina and the Waves – "Love Shine a Light"
- Kavana – "I Can Make You Feel Good", "MFEO", "Crazy Chance '97"
- Kenickie – "In Your Car", "Nightlife"
- Kylie Minogue – "Did It Again"
- Kym Mazelle – "Young Hearts Run Free"
- Levellers – "What A Beautiful Day"
- The Lightning Seeds – "Sugar Coated Iceberg", "You Showed Me"
- Lisa Stansfield – "The Real Thing", "Never, Never Gonna Give You Up"
- Livin' Joy – "Where Can I Find Love", "Deep in You"
- Louise – "Arms Around the World", "Let's Go Round Again"
- M People – "Just for You", "Fantasy Island"
- Mansun – "She Makes My Nose Bleed", "Taxloss", "Closed for Business"
- Mariah Carey – "Honey"
- Mark Morrison – "Who's the Mack!"
- Mark Owen – "Clementine", "I Am What I Am"
- Meredith Brooks – "Bitch"
- Metallica – "The Memory Remains"
- Michael Bolton – "The Best of Love"
- Michelle Gayle – "Do You Know", "Sensational"
- Moby – "James Bond Theme"
- Monaco – "What Do You Want from Me?", "Sweet Lips"
- Morrissey – "Alma Matters", "Roy's Keen"
- N-Trance – "D.I.S.C.O.", "Da Ya Think I'm Sexy?" (feat. Rod Stewart)
- N-Tyce – "We Come to Party"
- Natalie Imbruglia – "Torn"
- No Doubt – "Don't Speak", "Spiderwebs"
- No Mercy – "Where Do You Go", "Please Don't Go"
- North & South – "I'm a Man Not a Boy", "Tarantino's New Star"
- The Notorious B.I.G. – "Mo Money, Mo Problems
- Nuyorican Soul – "Runaway" (feat. India)
- Oasis – "D'You Know What I Mean?", "Stand by Me"
- Ocean Colour Scene – "Hundred Mile High City", "Travellers Tune", "Better Day"
- Olive – "You're Not Alone", "Outlaw"
- The Orb – "Toxygene"
- OTT – "Let Me In", "All Out Of Love"
- The Outhere Brothers – "Let Me Hear You Say 'Ole Ole'"
- Paula Cole – "Where Have All the Cowboys Gone?"
- Pet Shop Boys – "A Red Letter Day"
- Peter Andre – "Natural", "All About Us", "Lonely"
- PF Project – "Choose Life" (feat. Ewan McGregor)
- Phil Collins – "Wear My Hat"
- Placebo – "Bruise Pristine", "Nancy Boy"
- Puff Daddy – "Been Around the World" (with The Family)
- Pulp – "Help the Aged"
- Prince – "The Holy River"
- Primal Scream – "Star"
- Reef – "Come Back Brighter", "Yer Old"
- Republica – "Ready to Go", "Drop Dead Gorgeous"
- Ricky Martin – "(Un, Dos, Tres) Maria"
- Robbie Williams – "Old Before I Die", "Lazy Days", "South of the Border", "Angels"
- Robert Miles – "Freedom" (feat. Kathy Sledge
- Rosie Gaines – "Closer than Close"
- Runrig – "The Greatest Flame"
- Sarah Brightman – "Time to Say Goodbye" (feat. Andrea Bocelli)
- Sash! – "Encore Une Fois", "Ecuador" (feat. Rodriguez), "Stay" (feat. La Trec)
- The Seahorses – "Love is the Law," "Blinded by the Sun", "Love Me and Leave Me", "You Can Talk to Me"
- Sean Maguire – "Today's the Day"
- Shaggy – "Piece of My Heart" (feat. Marsha)
- Shola Ama – "You're the One I Love", "You Might Need Somebody"
- Sinéad O'Connor – "This Is to Mother You"
- Skunk Anansie – "Hedonism (Just Because You Feel Good), "Brazen (Weep)"
- Sly and Robbie – "Night Nurse" (feat. Simply Red)
- Smash Mouth – "Walkin' on the Sun"
- Smoke City – "Underwater Love"
- Space – "Dark Clouds"
- Spice Girls – "Mama/Who Do You Think You Are", "Spice Up Your Life", "Too Much"
- Stereophonics – "A Thousand Trees"
- Steven Houghton – "Wind Beneath My Wings"
- Sting – "Roxanne '97" (with The Police)
- Suede – "Saturday Night"
- Supergrass – "Richard III", "Sun Hits the Sky", "Late in the Day"
- The Supernaturals – "The Day Before Yesterday's Man"
- Symposium – "Fairweather Friend"
- Teenage Fanclub – "Ain't That Enough"
- Terrorvision – "Easy"
- Texas – "Say What You Want", "Halo", "Put Your Arms Around Me"
- Tina Moore – "Never Gonna Let You Go"
- Todd Terry – "Something Goin' On, "It's Over Love" (feat. Shannon)
- UB40 – "Tell Me Is It True"
- Ultra Naté – "Free"
- Universal – "Rock Me Good"
- Warren G – "I Shot the Sheriff"
- Wet Wet Wet – "If I Never See You Again", "Strange", "Yesterday"
- The Wildhearts – "Anthem"

== 1998 ==
- 4 The Cause – "Stand by Me"
- 5ive – "When the Lights Go Out", "Got the Feelin'", "Everybody Get Up", "Until the Time Is Through"
- 187 Lockdown – "Kung-Fu"
- 911 – "All I Want Is You", "More Than a Woman"
- Ace of Base – "Life Is a Flower", "Cruel Summer", "Always Have Always Will"
- Adam Garcia – "Night Fever"
- Aerosmith – "I Don't Want to Miss a Thing"
- Air – "Sexy Boy"
- Alda – "Real Good Time"
- Alexia – "Uh La La La", "Gimme Love"
- Alisha's Attic – "The Incidentals"
- All Saints – "Never Ever" [3rd performance], "Under the Bridge/Lady Marmalade", Bootie Call, War of Nerves
- All Seeing I – "Beat Goes On"
- Another Level – "Freak Me"
- Apollo 440 – "Lost in Space"
- Aqua – "Doctor Jones", "Turn Back Time", "Good Morning Sunshine"
- Ash – "Jesus Says"
- B*Witched – "C'est la Vie", "Rollercoaster", "To You I Belong"
- Babybird – "If You'll Be Mine" [Acoustic version]
- Backstreet Boys – "All I Have to Give"
- Baddiel & Skinner – "3 Lions '98" (with Lightning Seeds)
- The Beautiful South – "Perfect 10", "Dumb"
- Bee Gees – "You Should Be Dancing" and "Tragedy" [Were of hits for Bee Gees respectively in 1976 and 1979]
- Billie – "Because We Want To", "Girlfriend", "She Wants You"
- Billie Myers – "Kiss the Rain"
- The Bluetones – "Solomon Bites the Worm"
- Boyzone – "All That I Need", "No Matter What", "I Love the Way You Love Me"
- Brandy – "Top of the World" (feat. Mase), "Have You Ever?"
- Bryan Adams – "I'm Ready", "On a Day Like Today", "When You're Gone" (feat. Melanie C)
- Byron Stingily – "You Make Me Feel (Mighty Real)"
- The Cardigans – "My Favourite Game"
- Carleen Anderson – "Maybe I'm Amazed"
- Cast from Casualty – "Everlasting Love"
- Catatonia – "Mulder and Scully", "Road Rage"
- Celine Dion – "My Heart Will Go On", "Immortality" (feat. Bee Gees), "I'm Your Angel" (feat. R. Kelly)
- Cher – "Believe"
- Chumbawamba – "Amnesia"
- Cleopatra – "Cleopatra's Theme", "Life Ain't Easy", "I Want You Back"
- Cliff Richard – "Can't Keep this Feeling In"
- Cornershop – "Brimful of Asha"
- The Corrs – "Dreams", "What Can I Do?", "So Young"
- Culture Club – "I Just Wanna Be Loved"
- Dana International – "Diva"
- David Morales – "Needin' U (I Needed U)" (feat. Juliet Roberts)
- Deetah – "Relax"
- Denise and Johnny – "Especially for You"
- Destiny's Child – "No, No, No", "With Me"
- The Divine Comedy – "Generation Sex"
- Dru Hill – "How Deep Is Your Love"
- Eagle-Eye Cherry – "Save Tonight"
- East 17 – "Each Time"
- Eels – "Last Stop: This Town"
- Emilia – "Big Big World"
- Faithless – "God Is a DJ", "Take the Long Way Home"
- Fastball – "The Way"
- Fat Les – "Vindaloo"
- Finley Quaye – "Your Love Gets Sweeter"
- Foo Fighters – "Walking After You"
- Fun Lovin' Criminals – "Love Unlimited"
- Garbage – "I Think I'm Paranoid", "Special"
- Green Day – "Good Riddance (Time of Your Life)"
- Hinda Hicks – "I Wanna Be Your Lady"
- Hole – "Celebrity Skin"
- Honeyz – "Finally Found", "End of the Line"
- Hurricane #1 – "Only the Strongest Will Survive"
- Ian Brown – "My Star", "Corpses", "Can't See Me"
- Imaani – "Where Are You?"
- James – "Destiny Calling", "Sit Down '98"
- Jamiroquai – "Deeper Underground"
- Jane McDonald – "Cruise Into Christmas"
- Jay-Z – "Hard Knock Life"
- Jennifer Paige – "Crush"
- Juliet Roberts – "So Good"
- The Jungle Brothers – "Jungle Brother"
- K-Ci & JoJo – "All My Life"
- Kele Le Roc – "Little Bit of Lovin'"
- Kylie Minogue – "Breathe"
- Kula Shaker – "Sound of Drums"
- LeAnn Rimes – "How Do I Live", "Blue"
- Lighthouse Family – "High"
- Lilys – " A Nanny in Manhattan"
- Louise – "All the Matters"
- Lucid – "I Can't Help Myself"
- Lutricia McNeal – "Ain't That Just the Way", "Someone Loves You Honey", "The Greatest Love You'll Never Know"
- Lynden David Hall – "Sexy Cinderella"
- M People – "Angel St"
- Madonna – "The Power of Good-Bye"
- Manic Street Preachers – "If You Tolerate This Your Children Will Be Next", "The Everlasting"
- Mansun – "Legacy", "Being a Girl"
- Mariah Carey – "My All"
- The Mavericks – "Dance the Night Away"
- Meja – "All 'Bout the Money"
- Melanie B – "I Want You Back" (feat. Missy Elliott)
- The Mighty Mighty Bosstones – "The Impression That I Get"
- Modern Talking – "You're My Heart, You're My Soul '98"
- Monica – "The First Night"
- Mousse T. – "Horny '98" (vs Hot 'n' Juicy)
- Natalie Imbruglia – "Big Mistake", "Wishing I Was There", "Smoke"
- OTT – "The Story of Love"
- Page & Plant – "Crossroads", "Most High"
- PJ Harvey – "A Perfect Day Elise"
- Placebo – "Pure Morning"
- Pras – "Ghetto Supastar" (feat. ODB and Mýa), "Blue Angels"
- Prince Buster – "Whine and Grine"
- Pulp – "This Is Hardcore", "Party Hard"
- Puff Daddy – "It's All About the Benjamins" (with The Family)
- R.E.M. – "Daysleeper", "Lotus". "Man on the Moon" [Was a their 1992s hit. Live at Top of the Pops Special]
- Republica – "From Rush Hour with Love"
- Rialto – "Untouchable"
- Robbie Williams – "Angels" [2nd and 3rd performance], "Let Me Entertain You", "Millennium", "Man Machine", "No Regrets"
- Robyn – "Show Me Love"
- Ruff Driverz – "Dreaming" (feat. Arrola)
- Saint Etienne – "Sylvie"
- Sarah McLachlan – "Adia"
- Sash! – "La Primavera", "Mysterious Times" (feat. Tina Cousins), "Move Mania" (feat. Shannon)
- Savage Garden – "Truly Madly Deeply", "To the Moon and Back"
- Shania Twain – "You're Still the One", "From This Moment On"
- Shed Seven – "The Heroes"
- Sheryl Crow – "My Favourite Mistake", "There Goes the Neighborhood"
- Shola Ama – "Much Love"
- Simple Minds –"Glitterball"
- Simply Red – "Say You Love Me", "The Air That I Breathe"
- Solid HarmoniE – "I Wanna Love You"
- Space – "Avenging Angels", "The Ballad of Tom Jones" (feat. Cerys Matthews), "Begin Again"
- Spacedust – "Gym and Tonic"
- Spice Girls – "Stop", "Viva Forever", "Goodbye"
- Spiritualized – "I Think I'm in Love"
- Steps – "5,6,7,8", "Last Thing on My Mind", "One for Sorrow", "Heartbeat"/"Tragedy"
- Stereophonics – "Local Boy in the Photograph", "The Bartender and the Thief"
- Super Furry Animals – "Ice Hockey Hair"
- Sweetbox – "Everything's Gonna Be Alright"
- T-Spoon – "Sex on the Beach"
- The Tamperer featuring Maya – "Feel It", "If You Buy This Record (Your Life Will Be Better)"
- Texas – "Say What You Want"/"Insane" (feat. Wu-Tang Clan)
- Tin Tin Out – "Here's Where the Story Ends" (feat. Shelley Nelson)
- Tori Amos – "Spark"
- Touch and Go – "Would You...?"
- Tzant – "Sounds of Wickedness"
- UB40 – "Come Back Darling"
- Ultra Naté – "Found a Cure"
- Usher – "You Make Me Wanna...", "Nice & Slow"
- Vanilla – "No Way, No Way"
- Vengaboys – "Up and Down"
- Vonda Shepard – "Searchin' My Soul"
- Wes – "Alane"
- Will Smith – "Just the Two of Us"
- The Wombles – "Remember You're a Womble"
- Wyclef Jean – "Gone till November"

== 1999 ==
- 3 Colours Red – "Beautiful Day"
- The 3 Jays – "Feeling It Too"
- 5ive – "If Ya Gettin' Down"
- 911 – "A Little Bit More", "Private Number"
- A1 – "Be the First to Believe"
- A+ – "Enjoy Yourself"
- A*Teens – "Mamma Mia"
- Adam Rickitt – "I Breathe Again"
- Aerosmith – "Pink"
- Alda – "Girls Night Out"
- Anastacia – "I'm Outta Love"
- Alice DeeJay – "Better Off Alone" [1st performance with DJ Jurgen], "Back in My Life"
- Alisha's Attic – "Wish I Were You"
- All Seeing I – "Walk Like a Panther" (feat. Tony Christie) [Version 1], "Walk Like a Panther" (feat. Jarvis Cocker) [Version 2]
- Andy Williams – "Music to Watch Girls By"
- Ann Lee – "2 Times"
- Another Level – "I Want You for Myself", "From the Heart"
- Armand Van Helden – "U Don't Know Me" (feat. Duane Harden), "Flowerz" (feat. Roland Clark)
- Artful Dodger – "Re-Rewind the Crowd Say Bo Selecta" (feat. Craig David)
- ATB – "9pm (Till I Come)", "Don't Stop!"
- Atomic Kitten – "Right Now"
- B*Witched – "Blame It on the Weatherman", "Jesse Hold On", "I Shall Be There" (feat. Ladysmith Black Mambazo)
- Backstreet Boys – "I Want It That Way"
- Barenaked Ladies – "One Week"
- The Beautiful South – "How Long's a Tear Take to Dry?"
- Beverley Knight – "Greatest Day"
- Billie – "Honey to the Bee"
- Binary Finary – "1999"
- Blondie – "Maria"
- Blur – "Tender", "Coffee & TV"
- Blockster – "You Should Be..."
- Boyzone – "When the Going Gets Tough", "Every Day I Love You"
- Britney Spears – "Baby One More Time", "Sometimes"
- Bryan Adams – "When You're Gone" (feat. Melanie C) [2nd performance], "Cloud Number 9"
- Busta Rhymes – "What's It Gonna Be?!" (feat. Janet Jackson)
- The Cardigans – "Erase/Rewind", "Hanging Around"
- Cartoons – "Witch Doctor", "DooDah!"
- Cast – "Beat Mama"
- Catatonia – "Dead from the Waist Down", "Londinium"
- Celine Dion – "That's the Way It Is"
- The Chemical Brothers – "Hey Boy Hey Girl" [Live from Woodstock]
- Chicane – "Saltwater" (feat. Máire Brennan)
- Christina Aguilera – "Genie in a Bottle"
- Cher – "Strong Enough", "All or Nothing"
- Cliff Richard – "The Millennium Prayer"
- The Corrs – "Runaway"
- Cuban Boys – "Cognoscenti vs. Intelligentsia"
- Culture Club – "Starman"
- Da Click – "Good Rhymes"
- Destiny's Child – "Bills, Bills, Bills", "Bug a Boo"
- Dina Carroll – "Without Love"
- The Divine Comedy – "National Express"
- DJ Sakin & Friends – "Protect Your Mind"
- Dru Hill – "These Are the Times"
- Eiffel 65 – "Blue (Da Ba Dee)"
- Elton John – "Written in the Stars" (feat. LeAnn Rimes)
- Elvis Costello – "She"
- Eminem – "My Name Is"
- Emmie – "More Than This"
- Eurythmics – "I Saved the World Today"
- Faithless – "Bring My Family Back"
- Feeder – "Insomnia", "Yesterday Went Too Soon"
- Fierce – "Dayz Like That"
- Fun Lovin' Criminals – "Korean Bodega"
- Gabrielle – "Sunshine"
- Garbage – "When I Grow Up", "You Look So Fine"
- Gay Dad – "To Earth with Love"
- Geri Halliwell – "Lift Me Up"
- Glamma Kid – "Taboo" (feat. Shola Ama)
- Happy Mondays – "The Boys Are Back in Town"
- Honeyz – "End of the Line" [2nd performance], "Love of a Lifetime", "Never Let You Down"
- Inner City – "Good Life (Buena Vida)"
- Jamiroquai – "Canned Heat", "King for a Day"
- Jennifer Lopez – "If You Had My Love", "Waiting for Tonight"
- Jordan Knight – "Give It to You"
- Juliet Roberts – "Bad Girls"
- Justin – "Over You"
- Kele Le Roc – "My Love"
- Kéllé Bryan – "Higher Than Heaven"
- Kula Shaker – "Shower Your Love"
- Lauryn Hill – "Ex-Factor"
- LeAnn Rimes – "Crazy"
- Leilani – "Madness Thing"
- Len – "Steal My Sunshine"
- Lenny Kravitz – "Fly Away"
- Liam Gallagher – "Carnation" (featuring Steve Cradock)
- Lighthouse Family – "Postcard from Heaven"
- Lit – "My Own Worst Enemy"
- Lolly – "Viva La Radio", "Big Boys Don't Cry"/"Rockin' Robin"
- Lou Bega – "Mambo No. 5"
- Lucid – "Crazy"
- M People – "Dreaming"
- Macy Gray – "I Try"
- Madness – "Lovestruck"
- Manic Street Preachers – "You Stole the Sun from My Heart"
- Mansun – "Six"
- Mariah Carey – "Do You Know Where You're Going To", "Heartbreaker"
- Mario Più – "Communication (Someboy Answer the Phone)"
- Martine McCutcheon – "Perfect Moment", "Talking in Your Sleep"/"Love Me"
- Melanie C – "Northern Star"
- Melanie G – "Word Up"
- Mirrorball – "Given Up"
- Moloko – "Sing It Back"
- NSYNC – "I Want You Back", "Tearin' Up My Heart"
- New Radicals – "You Get What You Give"
- Next of Kin – "24 Hours from You"
- The Offspring – "Pretty Fly (for a White Guy)", "Why Don't You Get a Job?"
- Pet Shop Boys – "I Don't Know What You Want...", "New York City Boy"
- Pete Heller – "Big Love"
- Phats & Small – "Turn Around"
- Phil Collins – "You'll Be In My Heart"
- Precious – "Say It Again"
- Prince – "Baby Knows"
- Progress – "Everybody" (feat. The Boy Wunda)
- R.E.M. – "At My Most Beautiful"
- R. Kelly – "If I Could Turn Back the Hands of Time"
- Red Hot Chili Peppers – "Scar Tissue"
- Ricky Martin – "Livin' la Vida Loca", "She's All I Ever Had"
- Robbie Williams – "She's the One"/"It's Only Us"
- Ronan Keating – "When You Say Nothing at All"
- Roxette – "Wish I Could Fly"
- S Club 7 – "Bring It All Back", "S Club Party", "Two in a Million/You're My Number One"
- Sebadoh – "Flame"
- Semisonic – "Secret Smile"
- Shania Twain – "When", "Honey, I'm Home", "That Don't Impress Me Much", "Man! I Feel Like a Woman!". "(If You're Not in It for Love) I'm Outta Here!", "Don't Be Stupid (You Know I Love You)", "You're Still the One" and "From This Moment On" [Live at Top of the Pops Shania Twain Special on 15 November 1999]
- Shed Seven – "Disco Down"
- Sheryl Crow – "Anything but Down"
- Sixpence None the Richer – "Kiss Me"
- Soulsearcher – "Can't Get Enough"
- Steps – "Better Best Forgotten", "Love's Got a Hold on My Heart", "After the Love Has Gone", "Say You'll Be Mine"/"Better the Devil You Know"
- Stereophonics – "Just Looking", "Pick a Part That's New"
- Tatyana Ali – "Boy You Knock Me Out" (feat. Will Smith)
- Terrorvision – "Tequila"
- Texas – "In Our Lifetime"
- Tina Turner – "When the Heartache Is Over"
- TLC – "No Scrubs", "Unpretty"
- Tom Jones – "Baby, It's Cold Outside" (feat. Cerys Matthews)
- TQ – "Westside", "Bye Bye Baby"
- Travis – "Writing to Reach You", "Why Does It Always Rain on Me?"
- Unkle – "Be There" (feat. Ian Brown)
- Ultra – "Rescue Me"
- Vengaboys – "We Like to Party! (The Vengabus)", "Boom, Boom, Boom, Boom", "We're Going to Ibiza", "Kiss (When the Sun Don't Shine)"
- Wamdue Project – "King of My Castle" (feat. Gaelle Addison)
- Westlife – Swear It Again, "If I Let You Go", "Flying Without Wings", "I Have a Dream"
- Whitney Houston – "It's Not Right but It's Okay", "My Love Is Your Love", "I Learned from the Best"
- The Wiseguys – "Ooh La La"
- Yomanda – "Synth and Strings"

== 2000 ==
- 5ive – "Keep On Movin'", "We Will Rock You" (feat. Queen)
- A1 – "Same Old Brand New You"
- Aaliyah – "Try Again"
- Alice DeeJay – "Will I Ever", "The Lonely One"
- All Saints – "Pure Shores", "Black Coffee"
- Anastacia – "I'm Outta Love", "Not That Kind"
- Andreas Johnson – "Glorious"
- Andy Williams – "It's So Easy" [Was his hit in 1970]
- Architechs – "Body Groove" (feat. Nana)
- Armand Van Helden – "Koochy"
- Artful Dodger – "Re-Rewind the Crowd Say Bo Selecta" (feat. Craig David) [3rd performance], "Movin' Too Fast" (feat. Romina Johnson)
- ATB – "Killer"
- Atomic Kitten – "See Ya", "I Want Your Love"
- Aurora – "Ordinary World" (feat. Naimee Coleman)
- Azzido Da Bass – "Dooms Night"
- B-15 Project – "Girls Like Us"
- B*Witched – "Jump Down"
- Backstreet Boys – "Shape of My Heart"
- Baha Men – "Who Let the Dogs Out?"
- Barry White – "You're the First, the Last, My Everything" and "Let the Music Play" [Were two his big hits, respectively of 1974 and 1975]
- Black Legend – "You See the Trouble with Me"
- Blink-182 – "All the Small Things"
- Bloodhound Gang – "The Bad Touch", "The Ballad of Chasey Lain"
- The Bluetones – "Autophilia"
- Blur – "Music Is My Radar". "Girls & Boys" and "Song 2" [Were two their historical hits. Live at Top of the Pops for promotion of their The Best Of]
- Bon Jovi – "It's My Life", "Thank You for Loving Me". "Livin' on a Prayer" [Acoustic version. Live at Top of the Pops 2 Special]
- Britney Spears – "Born to Make You Happy", "Oops!... I Did It Again", "Lucky"
- Celine Dion – "That's the Way It Is", "The First Time Ever I Saw Your Face"
- Chanté Moore – "Straight Up"
- The Charlatans – "Impossible"
- Chicane – "Don't Give Up" (feat. Bryan Adams)
- Christina Aguilera – "What a Girl Wants"
- Coldplay – "Yellow", "Trouble"
- The Corrs – "Breathless", "Irresistible"
- Craig David – "Fill Me In", "7 Days", "Walking Away"
- Damage – "Ghetto Romance"
- Daphne & Celeste – "Ooh Stick You", "U.G.L.Y."
- Darude – "Sandstorm"
- David Gray – "Babylon"
- Destiny's Child – "Say My Name", "Jumpin' Jumpin'", "Independent Women Part I"
- DJ Luck & MC Neat – "A Little Bit of Luck", "Masterblaster 2000"
- Donell Jones – "U Know What's Up"
- Doves – "The Man Who Told Everything"
- Dr. Dre – "Forget About Dre" (feat. Eminem)
- Eels – "Mr. E's Beautiful Blues"
- Eminem – "The Real Slim Shady", "Stan" (feat. Dido)
- Eurythmics – "17 Again" [Acoustic version]
- Fierce – "Sweet Love 2k"
- Fragma – "Everytime You Need Me" (feat. Maria Rubia), "Toca's Miracle" (feat. Coco Star)
- Gabrielle – "Rise", "When a Woman", "Should I Stay"
- Geri Halliwell – "Bag It Up"
- Girl Thing – "Last One Standing"
- Green Day – "Minority"
- Heather Small – "Proud", "You Need Love Like I Do" (feat. Tom Jones)
- Hi-Gate – "Pitchin' (In Every Direction)"
- Iron Maiden – "The Wicker Man"
- Janet Jackson – "Doesn't Really Matter"
- Jennifer Lopez – "Love Don't Cost a Thing"
- Jessica Simpson – "I Wanna Love You Forever", "I Think I'm in Love with You"
- JJ72 – "Snow", "October Swimmer"
- Kandi – "Don't Think I'm Not"
- Kosheen – "Hide U"
- Kraftwerk – "Expo 2000"
- Kylie Minogue – "Spinning Around", "On a Night Like This", "Please Stay", "Santa Baby"
- Lene Marlin – "Sitting Down Here"
- Limp Bizkit – "Take a Look Around", "My Generation"
- Lionel Richie – "Angel"
- Lonestar – "Amazed"
- Louise – "Beautiful Inside"
- Lulu – "Where the Poor Boys Dance"
- Lyte Funkie Ones – "Girl on TV"
- Madasun – "Walking on Water"
- Madison Avenue – "Don't Call Me Baby", "Who the Hell Are You"
- Madonna – "Music", "Don't Tell Me"
- Mansun – "I Can Only Disappoint U"
- Martine McCutcheon – "I'm Over You"
- Mary Mary – "Shackles (Praise You)"
- Melanie B – "Tell Me"
- Melanie C – "Never Be the Same Again" (feat. Lisa "Left Eye" Lopes) [2nd performance as Solo], "I Turn to You", "If That Were Me"
- Modjo – "Lady (Hear Me Tonight)"
- Moby – "Porcelain"
- Moloko – "The Time Is Now"
- Montell Jordan – "Get It On Tonite"
- Muse – "Muscle Museum", "Sunburn", "Unintended"
- NSYNC – "Bye Bye Bye", "It's Gonna Be Me"
- N'n'G – "Right Before My Eyes" (feat. Kallaghan)
- Nelly – "Country Grammar"
- Nu Generation – "In Your Arms (Rescue Me)"
- Oasis – "Go Let It Out", "Who Feels Love?", "Sunday Morning Call" [Acoustic version]
- The Offspring – "Original Prankster"
- Oxide & Neutrino – "Bound 4 Da Reload (Casualty)"
- Pet Shop Boys – "You Only Tell Me You Love Me When You're Drunk"
- Pink – "There You Go", "Most Girls"
- Placebo – "Slave to the Wage"
- Point Break – "You"
- Precious – "Rewind"
- Public Domain – "Operation Blade (Blade in the Place)"
- Richard Blackwood – "Mama Who Da Man"
- Ricky Martin – "She Bangs"
- Robbie Williams – "Rock DJ", "Kids" (feat. Kylie Minogue), "Supreme"
- Ronan Keating – "Life Is a Rollercoaster", The Way You Make Me Feel"
- S Club 7 – "Reach", "Natural", "Never Had a Dream Come True"
- Sade – "By Your Side"
- Samantha Mumba – "Gotta Tell You", "Body II Body"
- Santana – "Smooth" (feat. Rob Thomas)
- Sash! – "Adelante"
- Savage Garden – "Crash and Burn"
- Shaft – "Mambo Italiano"
- Shania Twain – "Don't Be Stupid (You Know I Love You)"
- Sheena Easton – "Giving Up Giving In"
- Sid Owen – "Good Thing Going" (feat. Chukki Star)
- Sisqó – "Got to Get It", "Thong Song"
- Sonique – "It Feels So Good"
- Southside Spinners – "Luvstruck"
- Spice Girls – "Holler"/"Let Love Lead the Way"
- Spiller – "Groovejet (If This Ain't Love)" (feat. Sophie Ellis-Bextor)
- Status Quo – "Mony Mony". "Paper Plane", "Caroline", "Down Down", "Roll Over Lay Down", "Rain", "Rockin' All Over the World" and "Whatever You Want" [Seven their historical hits. Live at Top of the Pops 2 Special on 22 November 2000]
- Stephen Gately – "New Beginning"
- Steps – "Deeper Shade of Blue", "When I Said Goodbye"/"Summer of Love", "Stomp", "It's The Way You Make Me Feel"
- Sugababes – "Overload", "New Year"
- Super Furry Animals – "Do or Die"
- Sweet Female Attitude – "Flowers"
- The Tamperer featuring Maya – "Hammer to the Heart"
- Texas – "In Demand"
- Tina Turner – "Whatever You Need"
- Tom Jones – "Sex Bomb" (feat. Mousse T.)
- Toni Braxton – "He Wasn't Man Enough"
- Toploader – "Achilles Heel", "Dancing in the Moonlight"
- True Steppers – "Out of Your Mind" (feat. Dane Bowers and Victoria Beckham)
- Tweenies – "Do the Lollipop", "Bananas", "Starlight", "Best Friends Forever", "No. 1"
- U2 – "Beautiful Day", "Elevation", "Stuck in a Moment You Can't Get Out Of"
- Vengaboys – "Shalala Lala"
- Watergate – "Heart of Asia"
- Westlife – "Seasons in the Sun", "Fool Again", "My Love", "What Becomes of the Brokenhearted", "What Makes a Man"
- Wyclef Jean – "911" (feat. Mary J. Blige)
- York – "On the Beach"
- Zombie Nation – "Kernkraft 400"

== 2001 ==
- Afroman – "Because I Got High"
- Alien Ant Farm – "Smooth Criminal"
- Alicia Keys – "Fallin'"
- Alizée – "Moi... Lolita"
- Anastacia – "Not That Kind", "I'm Outta Love", "Cowboys & Kisses", "Made for Lovin' You", "Paid My Dues"
- Ash – "Candy"
- Atomic Kitten – "Whole Again", "Eternal Flame"
- Backstreet Boys – More than That
- The Bangles – "Eternal Flame" [Was a hit for The Bangles in 1989]
- Bee Gees – "This Is Where I Came In"
- Bell & Spurling – "Sven, Sven, Sven"
- Björk – "Hidden Place"
- Blink-182 – "The Rock Show"
- Blue – "All Rise", "Too Close", "If You Come Back"
- Brian Harvey – "Loving You (Ole Ole Ole)" (feat. The Refugee Crew)
- Cher – "The Music's No Good Without You"
- City High – "What Would You Do?"
- Cosmic Gate – "Fire Wire"
- Crazy Town – "Butterfly", "Revolving Door"
- DJ Ötzi – "Hey Baby"
- DJ Pied Piper – "Do You Really Like It?"
- The Dandy Warhols – "Bohemian Like You"
- Daniel Bedingfield – "Gotta Get thru This"
- Depeche Mode – "I Feel Loved"
- Destiny's Child – "Survivor", "Bootylicious"
- Elton John – "I Want Love", "This Train Don't Stop There Anymore". "American Triangle", "Border Song", "Saturday Night's Alright for Fighting", "Bennie and the Jets" and "I'm Still Standing" [Live at Top of the Pops 2 Elton John Special]
- Emma Bunton – "What Took You So Long?"
- Eddy Grant – "I Don't Wanna Dance"
- Feeder – "Buck Rogers", "Seven Days in the Sun", "Turn", "Just a Day EP"
- Gabrielle – "Out of Reach"
- Garbage – "Androgyny"
- Geri Halliwell – "It's Raining Men", "Scream If You Wanna Go Faster", "Calling"
- Gordon Haskell – "How Wonderful You Are"
- Hear'Say – "Pure and Simple","The Way to Your Love", "Everybody"
- Hermes House Band – "Country Roads"
- Ian Van Dahl – "Castles in the Sky", "Will I?"
- Incubus – "Wish You Were Here"
- James – "Getting Away With It (All Messed Up)"
- Jamiroquai – "Little L", "You Give Me Something"
- Janet Jackson – "All for You", "Someone to Call My Lover"
- Jean Jacques Smoothie – "2 People"
- Jennifer Lopez – "Ain't It Funny" [Top of the Pops Awards performance], "I'm Real"
- Jessica Simpson – "Irresistible"
- Kosheen – "Catch"
- Kylie Minogue – "Can't Get You Out of My Head"
- Liberty – "Thinking It Over"
- Lil' Bow Wow – "Bow Wow (That's My Name)"
- Limp Bizkit – "Faith"
- Lindsay Dracass – "No Dream Impossible"
- Linkin Park – "Crawling", "In the End", "Papercut"
- Louise – "Stuck in the Middle with You"
- Mariah Carey – "Never Too Far/Hero Medley" (feat. Westlife) [Live at Top of the Pops Awards]
- Mary J. Blige – "Family Affair"
- Mel B – "Feels So Good"
- Mis-Teeq – "One Night Stand"
- Missy Elliott – "Get Ur Freak On"
- Modern Talking – "Win The Race"
- Muse – "Plug in Baby", "New Born", "Bliss", "Hyper Music / Feeling Good"
- My Vitriol – "Always: Your Way", "Grounded"
- N-Trance – "Set You Free"
- Nelly Furtado – "I'm Like a Bird"
- O-Town – "Liquid Dreams"
- The Ones – "Flawless"
- OPM – "Heaven Is a Halfpipe"
- Par-T-One – "I'm So Crazy" (vs INXS)
- Pink – "You Make Me Sick"
- PPK – "ResuRection"
- The Proclaimers – "Theres a Touch"
- R.E.M – "Imitation of Life"
- Radiohead – "Pyramid Song"
- Right Said Fred – "You're My Mate"
- Riva – "Who Do You Love Now? (Stringer)" (feat. Dannii Minogue)
- Robbie Williams – "Eternity/The Road to Mandalay", "Somethin' Stupid" (feat. Nicole Kidman)
- Ronan Keating – "Lovin' Each Day"
- Ryan Adams – "Firecracker"
- S Club 7 – "Don't Stop Movin'", "Have You Ever"
- Samantha Mumba – "Lately"
- Shaggy – "It Wasn't Me" (feat. Rikrok), "Angel" (feat. Rayvon), "Luv Me, Luv Me" (feat. Samantha Cole)
- Sisqó – "Dance for Me"
- So Solid Crew – "21 Seconds"
- Soft Cell – "Tainted Love" [Was their best selling single of 1981. Live at Top of the Pops 2001 on the occasion of their reunion]
- Sophie Ellis-Bextor – "Murder on the Dancefloor"
- Steps – "It's the Way You Make Me Feel", "Here and Now / You'll Be Sorry", "Chain Reaction"/"One for Sorrow", "Words Are Not Enough/I Know Him So Well"
- Stereophonics – "Handbags and Gladrags"
- Sting – "Fragile" [Was a hit for Sting in 1991]
- The Strokes – "New York City Cops", "Last Nite"
- Sugababes – "Run for Cover"
- Sum 41 – "Fat Lip", "In Too Deep"
- Texas – "Inner Smile", "I Don't Want a Lover" [Originally a hit for Texas in 1989 and re-released in 2001]
- Train – "Drops of Jupiter (Tell Me)"
- Travis – "Sing", "Side"
- Turin Brakes – "Mind Over Money"
- Tweenies – "Do the Lollipop"
- Uncle Kracker – "Follow Me"
- Usher – "U Remind Me", "U Got It Bad"
- Weezer – "Hash Pipe"
- Westlife – "Uptown Girl", "When You're Looking Like That"
- Wheatus – "Teenage Dirtbag", "A Little Respect"
- The White Stripes – "Hotel Yorba", "Fell in Love with a Girl"
- Wideboys – "Sambuca" (feat. Dennis G)
- Wyclef Jean – "Perfect Gentleman"

== 2002 ==
- 1 Giant Leap – "My Culture" (feat. Maxi Jazz and Robbie Williams)
- 4 Strings – "Take Me Away (Into the Night)"
- A – "Nothing"
- Abs – "What You Got"
- Anastacia – "One Day in Your Life", "Why'd You Lie to Me", "You'll Never Be Alone"
- Appleton – "Fantasy"
- Ashanti – "Foolish", "Happy"
- Atomic Kitten – "The Tide Is High (Get the Feeling), "The Last Goodbye"/"Be with You"
- Avril Lavigne – "Complicated", "Sk8er Boi"
- Badly Drawn Boy – "You Were Right"
- Beverley Knight – "Shoulda Woulda Coulda"
- Beyoncé – "Work It Out"
- Big Brovaz – "Nu Flow"
- Björk – "Cocoon"
- Blazin' Squad – "Crossroads", "Love on the Line"
- Blue – "Fly By II", "One Love", "Sorry Seems to Be the Hardest Word" (feat. Elton John)
- Bon Jovi – "Everyday"
- Brandy – "What About Us?"
- Britney Spears – "Overprotected", "I'm Not a Girl, Not Yet a Woman"
- Bryan Adams – "Here I Am"
- Busted – "What I Go to School For"
- The Calling – "Wherever You Will Go", "Adrienne"
- Celine Dion – "A New Day Has Come", "I'm Alive", "Goodbye's (The Saddest Word)"
- The Cheeky Girls – "Cheeky Song (Touch My Bum)"
- Christina Aguilera – "Dirrty" (feat. Redman)
- Christina Milian – "When You Look at Me"
- City High – "Caramel" (feat. Eve)
- Coldplay – "The Scientist"
- Creed – "My Sacrifice"
- Daniel Bedingfield – "If You're Not the One"
- Dannii Minogue – "Put the Needle on It"
- Darius – "Colourblind"
- Darren Hayes – "Insatiable"
- DB Boulevard – "Point of View"
- Dee Dee – "Forever"
- Def Leppard – "Now"
- Distant Soundz – "Time After Time"
- DJ Sammy – "Heaven" (with Yanou feat. Do)
- Doves – "There Goes the Fear"
- The Electric Soft Parade – "Silent To The Dark II"
- Enrique Iglesias – "Hero"
- Elton John – "Original Sin", "Border Song", "Saturday Night's Alright For Fighting"
- Elvis – "A Little Less Conversation" (vs JXL)
- Eve – "Gangsta Lovin'" (feat. Alicia Keys)
- Feeder – "Come Back Around"
- Fischerspooner – "Emerge"
- Flip & Fill – "Shooting Star"
- Foo Fighters – "All My Life", "Times Like These"
- Garbage – "Cherry Lips (Go Baby Go!)", "Breaking up the Girl"
- Gareth Gates – "Unchained Melody", "Anyone of Us (Stupid Mistake)", "What My Heart Wants to Say"
- Gary Numan – "Are 'Friends' Electric?", "Rip"
- Girls Aloud – "Sound of the Underground"
- The Hives – "Hate to Say I Told You So"
- Hundred Reasons – "If I Could"
- Holly Valance – "Kiss Kiss", "Down Boy"
- Incubus – "Are You In?"
- Ja Rule – "Always on Time" (feat. Ashanti), "Thug Lovin'" (feat. Bobby Brown)
- Jakatta – "My Vision" (feat. Seal)
- Jamiroquai – "Love Foolosophy"
- Jennifer Lopez – "Jenny from the Block"
- Jessica Garlick – "Come Back"
- Jimmy Cliff – "Many Rivers to Cross", "I Want I Do I Get"
- Jimmy Eat World – "The Middle"
- Jurgen Vries – "The Theme"
- Justin Timberlake – "Like I Love You"
- Kelly Llorenna – "Tell It to My Heart"
- Kylie Minogue – "In Your Eyes", "Come into My World" (Fischerspooner mix)
- Lange – "Drifting Away" (feat. Skye)
- Las Ketchup – "The Ketchup Song (Aserejé)"
- Lasgo – "Something"
- LeAnn Rimes – "Life Goes On"
- Liberty X – "Just a Little", "Holding On for You"
- LL Cool J – "Luv U Better"
- Lostprophets – "The Fake Sound of Progress"
- Mad'House – "Like a Prayer"
- Manic Street Preachers – "There by the Grace of God"
- Milky – "Just the Way You Are"
- Mis-Teeq – "B With Me"
- Missy Elliott – "Work It"
- More Fire Crew – "Oi!" (feat. Platinum 45)
- Ms. Dynamite – "Dy-Na-Mi-Tee"
- Muse – "In Your World"
- N-Trance – "Forever"
- Nelly – "Hot in Herre", "Dilemma" (feat. Kelly Rowland)
- New Order – "Here to Stay"
- Nick Carter – "Help Me"
- Nickelback – "How You Remind Me", "Too Bad"
- Oasis – "The Hindu Times", "Stop Crying Your Heart Out", "Little by Little"/"She Is Love". "Don't Look Back in Anger", "Acquiesce" and "My Generation (The Who)" [Live at Top of the Pops 2 Special on 11 April 2002]
- One True Voice – "Sacred Trust/After You're Gone"
- P.O.D. – "Youth of the Nation"
- Pay As U Go – "Champagne Dance"
- Pet Shop Boys – "Home and Dry", "I Get Along"
- Pink – "Get the Party Started", "Just like a Pill", "Family Portrait"
- Princess Superstar – "Bad Babysitter"
- Puddle of Mudd – "She Hates Me"
- Queens of the Stone Age – "No One Knows" (feat. Dave Grohl)
- Red Hot Chili Peppers – "By the Way"
- Richard Ashcroft – "A Song for the Lovers"
- Rik Waller – "I Will Always Love You"
- Robbie Williams – "Feel"
- Romeo – "Romeo Dunn"
- Ronan Keating – "If Tomorrow Never Comes", "We've Got Tonight" (feat. Lulu)
- Rosie Ribbons – "Blink"
- Roxy Music – "Love Is the Drug"
- Russell Watson – "Someone Like You" (feat. Faye Tozer)
- S Club 7 – "You"
- S Club Juniors – "One Step Closer", "Automatic High", "New Direction"
- Samantha Mumba – "I'm Right Here"
- Santana – "The Game of Love" (feat. Michelle Branch)
- Scooter – "The Logical Song"
- Shaggy – "Me Julie" (feat. Ali G)
- Shakira – "Whenever, Wherever", "Underneath Your Clothes", "Objection (Tango)"
- Shy FX & T Power – "Shake Ur Body" (feat. Di)
- Spiritualised – "Do It All Over Again"
- Status Quo – "Rockin' All Over The World" [Was a hit for Status Quo in 1977 and performed on the 2000th edition of TOTP in 2002]
- Steve Balsamo – "Sugar for the Soul"
- The Streets – "Don't Mug Yourself"
- Sugababes – "Freak like Me", "Round Round", "Angels with Dirty Faces"/"Stronger"
- Sum 41 – "Motivation"
- Shania Twain – "I'm Gonna Getcha Good!"
- Tim Deluxe – "It Just Won't Do" (feat. Sam Obernik)
- Tom Jones – "Pussycat" (feat. Wyclef Jean)
- Truth Hurts – "Addictive" (feat. Rakim)
- Vanessa Carlton – "A Thousand Miles"
- The Vines – "Get Free"
- Westlife – "World of Our Own", "Unbreakable", "Miss You Nights"
- The White Stripes – "Dead Leaves and the Dirty Ground"
- Who Da Funk – "Shiny Disco Balls" (feat. Jessica Eve)
- Will Young – "Anything Is Possible"/"Evergreen", "Light My Fire", "The Long and Winding Road"/"Suspicious Minds" (feat. Gareth Gates)
- X-Press 2 – "Lazy" (feat. David Byrne)

== 2003 ==
- 50 Cent – "In da Club"
- Ainslie Henderson – "Keep Me a Secret"
- Angel City – "Love Me Right..." (feat. Lara McAllen)
- Appleton – "Don't Worry"
- Atomic Kitten – "Love Doesn't Have to Hurt"
- Audio Bullys – "We Don't Care"
- Audioslave – "Cochise"
- Avril Lavigne – "I'm with You"
- B2K – "Bump, Bump, Bump" (feat. P. Diddy)
- Badly Drawn Boy – "Born Again"
- Benny Benassi – "Satisfaction" (feat. The Biz)
- Beyoncé – "Crazy in Love" (feat. Jay-Z), "Naughty Girl"
- Big Brovaz – "OK"
- The Black Eyed Peas – "Where Is the Love?"
- Blazin' Squad – "Reminisce / Where the Story Ends", "We Just Be Dreamin'", "Flip Reverse", "Shorty", "Supastar"
- Blondie – "Good Boys"
- Blue – "U Make Me Wanna", "Guilty", "Signed, Sealed, Delivered, I'm Yours" (feat. Stevie Wonder and Angie Stone)
- Blur – "Out of Time", "Good Song", "Crazy Beat"
- Busted – "Year 3000", "You Said No", "Crashed The Wedding", "Sleeping With The Light On"
- Cam'ron – "Hey Ma" (feat. Juelz Santana)
- Christina Aguilera – "Beautiful"
- Coldplay – "Clocks"
- The Coral – "Don't Think You're the First"
- Craig David – "Hidden Agenda"
- Daniel Bedingfield – "If You're Not the One" [2nd performance]
- Dannii Minogue – "I Begin to Wonder", "Don't Wanna Lose This Feeling"
- Darius – "Incredible (What I Meant to Say)"
- The Darkness – "I Believe in a Thing Called Love"
- Darren Hayes – "Crush (1980 Me)"
- David Sneddon – "Stop Living the Lie"
- Delta Goodrem – "Born to Try", "Lost Without You"
- Despina Vandi – "Gia"
- Divine Inspiration – "The Way (Put Your Hand in My Hand)"
- DJ Sammy – "The Boys of Summer" (feat. Loona and Mel)
- Electric Six – "Danger! High Voltage", "Gay Bar", "Radio Ga Ga"
- Emma Bunton – "Free Me"
- Erasure – "Solsbury Hill"
- Eve – "Satisfaction"
- Fatman Scoop – "Be Faithful" (feat. Crooklyn Clan)
- Feeder – "Just the Way I'm Feeling", "Forget About Tomorrow"
- Flip & Fill – "I Wanna Dance with Somebody"
- Foo Fighters – "Times Like These"
- Gareth Gates – "Spirit in the Sky" (feat. The Kumars)
- Gary Jules – "Mad World" (feat. Michael Andrews)
- Gary Numan – "Crazier"
- George Michael – "The Grave"
- Girls Aloud – "Jump", "No Good Advice"
- Good Charlotte – "Lifestyles of the Rich and Famous"
- Iron Maiden – "Wildest Dreams"
- Jaimeson – "True" (feat. Angel Blu)
- Jay-Z – "'03 Bonnie & Clyde" (feat. Beyoncé)
- Jamelia – "Superstar"
- Javine – "Surrender (Your Love)"
- Jemini – "Cry Baby"
- Jennifer Lopez – "All I Have" (feat. LL Cool J)
- Junior Senior – "Move Your Feet"
- Jurgen Vries – "The Opera Song (Brave New World)" (feat. CMC)
- Justin Timberlake – "Cry Me a River"
- Kelly – "Changes" (feat. Ozzy Osbourne)
- Kelly Rowland – "Stole"
- Kevin Lyttle – "Turn Me On"
- Kira – "I'll Be Your Angel"
- Kylie Minogue – "Slow", "After Dark"
- The Libertines – "Don't Look Back into the Sun", "Time for Heroes"
- Linkin Park – "Somewhere I Belong", "Faint"
- Lisa Scott-Lee – "Lately", "Too Far Gone"
- Ludacris – "Stand Up"
- Matt Goss – "I'm Coming with Ya"
- Melanie C – "Here It Comes Again", "On the Horizon"
- Mis-Teeq – "Scandalous"
- Missy Elliott – "Gossip Folks" (feat. Ludacris), "Pass That Dutch"
- The Mock Turtles – "Can You Dig It?"
- Moloko – "Familiar Feeling"
- Muse – "Time Is Running Out"
- The Music – "The Truth Is No Words"
- Nelly – "Work It" (feat. Justin Timberlake)
- Nelly Furtado – "Powerless (Say What You Want)"
- Norah Jones – "Come Away with Me"
- Oasis – "Songbird"
- OK Go – "Get Over It"
- OutKast – "Hey Ya!"
- Panjabi MC – "Mundian To Bach Ke"
- Phil Collins – "Look Through My Eyes"
- Pink – "Trouble"
- Placebo – "The Bitter End"
- Rachel Stevens – "Sweet Dreams My LA Ex"
- Richard Ashcroft – "Science of Silence"
- Richard X – "Being Nobody" (vs. Liberty X)
- Ronan Keating – "The Long Goodbye", "Lost for Words"
- Room 5 – "Make Luv" (feat. Oliver Cheatham)
- Röyksopp – "Eple"
- S Club 8 – "Fool No More"
- S Club Juniors – "Puppy Love/Sleigh Ride"
- Scooter – "Weekend!"
- Sean Paul – "Gimme the Light"
- Shania Twain – "Ka-Ching!", "Forever and for Always"
- Simply Red – "Sunrise"
- Sinéad Quinn – "I Can't Break Down"
- Solomon Burke – "Everybody Needs Somebody to Love", "None of Us Are Free"
- Sophie Ellis-Bextor – "Mixed Up World"
- Stereophonics – "Since I Told You It's Over"
- Sugababes – "Shape", "Hole in the Head"
- Syntax – "Pray"
- t.A.T.u. – "All the Things She Said"
- The Thrills – "One Horse Town"
- Tommi – "Like What"
- Turin Brakes – "Pain Killer"
- Westlife – "Tonight", "Hey Whatever"
- The Wildhearts – "Stormy in the North, Karma in the South"
- Yeah Yeah Yeahs – "Maps"
- Zwan – "Honestly"

== 2004 ==
- The 411 – "On My Knees", "Dumb"
- Ana Johnsson – "We Are"
- Anastacia – "Left Outside Alone", "Sick and Tired", "Welcome to My Truth"
- Avril Lavigne – "Don't Tell Me", "My Happy Ending"
- Babyshambles – "Killamangiro"
- The Black Eyed Peas – "Hey Mama", "Let's Get It Started"
- Blazin' Squad – "Here 4 One", "Revolution", "Shorty", "We're Still Here"
- Blink-182 – "I Miss You"
- Blue – "Breathe Easy", "Bubblin'", "Curtain Falls"
- Brandy – "Afrodisiac"
- Brian McFadden – "Almost Here" (feat. Delta Goodrem)
- Britney Spears – "Toxic", "Everytime"
- Busted – "Teenage Kicks", "3am", "Thunderbirds", "Air Hostess"
- The Calling – "Things Will Go My Way"
- Christina Milian – "Dip It Low"
- Ciara – "1, 2 Step"
- The Corrs – "Summer Sunshine", "Angel"
- Darius – "Kinda Love"
- Darren Hayes – "Pop!ular"
- Delta Goodrem – "Out of the Blue"
- Destiny's Child – "Lose My Breath", "Soldier"
- Duran Duran – "(Reach Up for The) Sunrise"
- Eamon – "Fuck It (I Don't Want You Back)"
- Elton John – "All That I'm Allowed"
- Embrace – "Gravity"
- Eminem – "Just Lose It"
- Emma Bunton – "I'll Be There", "Crickets Sing for Anamaria"
- Enrique Iglesias – "Not in Love" (feat. Kelis)
- Eric Prydz – "Call on Me"
- Faithless – "I Want More"
- The Farm – "All Together Now"
- Fatman Scoop – "It Takes Scoop" (feat. The Crooklyn Clan)
- Franz Ferdinand – "Take Me Out", "Matinee"
- Good Charlotte – "Predictable", "I Just Wanna Live"
- Green Day – "American Idiot", "Boulevard of Broken Dreams"
- Groove Armada – "I See You Baby"
- The Hives – "Walk Idiot Walk"
- Hoobastank – "The Reason"
- I Dream – "Dreaming" (feat. Calvin & Frankie), "Welcome to Avalon Heights"
- Intenso Project – "Get It On" (feat. Lisa Scott-Lee)
- Jamelia – "See It in a Boy's Eyes", "DJ"
- Janet Jackson – "Just a Little While, "All Nite (Don't Stop)"
- Jessica Simpson – "Take My Breath Away", "With You"
- JoJo – "Leave (Get Out)"
- Joss Stone – "You Had Me", "Right to Be Wrong"
- Kane – "Rain Down on Me"
- Keane – "Everybody's Changing", "This Is the Last Time"
- The Killers – "Mr. Brightside"
- Kristian Leontiou – "Story of My Life"
- Kylie Minogue – "Red Blooded Woman", "Chocolate", "I Believe in You", "The Minogue Medley"
- LMC – "Take Me to the Clouds Above" (vs. U2)
- Lostprophets – "Wake Up", "Goodbye Tonight"
- Lucie Silvas – "What You're Made of"
- Marilyn Manson – "Personal Jesus"
- Maroon 5 – "Harder to Breathe", "This Love", "She Will Be Loved", "Sunday Morning"
- Michael Andrews – "Mad World" (feat. Gary Jules)
- Michael Gray – "The Weekend"
- Minnie Driver – "Everything I've Got in My Pocket"
- Morrissey – "Irish Blood, English Heart", "First of the Gang to Die"
- Natasha Bedingfield – "These Words", "Unwritten"
- Nelly Furtado – "Força"
- The Offspring – "Hit That"
- Pete Doherty – "For Lovers" (feat. Wolfman)
- Pink – "God Is a DJ"
- Razorlight – "Golden Touch", "Vice"
- Robbie Williams – "Misunderstood"
- The Shapeshifters – "Lola's Theme"
- Shaznay Lewis – "Never Felt Like This Before"
- Snow Patrol – "Run"
- StoneBridge – "Put 'Em High" (feat. Theresse)
- Sugababes – "In the Middle"
- Supergrass – "Kiss of Life"
- U2 – "Vertigo"
- Victoria Beckham – "This Groove"
- Westlife – "Obvious"

== 2005 ==
- 50 Cent – "Candy Shop", "Hustler's Ambition"
- Amerie – "1 Thing"
- Anastacia – "Pieces of a Dream"
- Arcade Fire – "Rebellion (Lies)"
- Athlete – "Wires", "Tourist", "Twenty Four Hours"
- Audio Bullys – "Shot You Down" (feat. Nancy Sinatra), "I'm in Love"
- Avril Lavigne – "He Wasn't"
- Backstreet Boys – "Incomplete"
- Bananarama – "Move in My Direction"
- BodyRockers – "I Like the Way"
- Bon Jovi – "Have a Nice Day"
- The Black Eyed Peas – "Don't Phunk with My Heart", "Don't Lie"
- The Bravery – "An Honest Mistake"
- Caesars – "Jerk It Out"
- The Choirboys – "Walking in the Air"
- Coldplay – "Speed of Sound", "What If", "Fix You"
- The Coral – "In the Morning"
- Craig David –"All the Way"
- Crazy Frog – "Axel F", "Popcorn"
- Damian "Jr. Gong" Marley – "Welcome to Jamrock"
- Daniel Powter – "Bad Day", "Free Loop", "Jimmy Gets High"
- Dannii Minogue – "Perfection" (vs. Soul Seekerz)
- Darius – "Live Twice"
- The Darkness – "One Way Ticket", "Knockers"
- David Gray – "The One I Love"
- The Dead 60s – "Riot Radio", "Ghostfaced Killer"
- Depeche Mode – "Precious"
- Destiny's Child – "Girl"
- Doves – "Black and White Town"
- Duran Duran – "What Happens Tomorrow"
- El Presidente – "Without You"
- Embrace – "Looking As You Are"
- Enya – "Amarantine"
- Eurythmics – "I've Got a Life"
- The Faders – "No Sleep Tonight"
- Feeder – "Feeling a Moment", "Shatter"
- Foo Fighters – "DOA"
- Franz Ferdinand – "Do You Want To", "Walk Away"
- Funeral for a Friend – "Streetcar"
- Garbage – "Why Do You Love Me"
- Goldfrapp – "Ooh La La", "Number 1"
- Good Charlotte – "The Chronicles of Life and Death"
- Green Day – "Holiday". "Jesus of Suburbia", "Welcome to Paradise", "St. Jimmy", "Give Me Novacaine", "She's a Rebel", and "Wake Me Up When September Ends" [Live at Top of the Pops Special]
- Gwen Stefani – "Hollaback Girl"
- Happy Mondays – "Playground Superstar"
- Hard-Fi – "Cash Machine", "Hard to Beat", "Living for the Weekend"
- Hayseed Dixie – "Holiday"
- Heather Small – "Proud"
- Hilary Duff – "Wake Up"
- Ian Brown – "All Ablaze"
- James Blunt – "High", "You're Beautiful", "Wisemen"
- Jamie Cullum – "Get Your Way"
- Jamiroquai – "Feels Just Like It Should", "Seven Days in Sunny June"
- Jem – "They", "Wish I"
- Jennifer Lopez – "Get Right", "Hold You Down" (feat. Fat Joe)
- John Legend – "Ordinary People"
- Kaiser Chiefs – "Oh My God", "I Predict a Riot", "Everyday I Love You Less and Less"
- Kasabian – "Cutt Off"
- Katie Melua – "Nine Million Bicycles", "I Cried for You"
- Kelly Clarkson – "Since U Been Gone", "Because of You"
- KT Tunstall – "Suddenly I See", "Under the Weather"
- Kubb – "Wicked Soul"
- Lee Ryan – "Army of Lovers", "Turn Your Car Around"
- Lemar – "Don't Give It Up"
- Les Rythmes Digitales – "Jacques Your Body (Make Me Sweat)"
- Lifehouse – "You and Me"
- Lucie Silvas – "Breathe In", "The Game Is Won"
- Madeleine Peyroux – You're Gonna Make Me Lonesome (When You Go)
- Madness – "Lola"
- Manic Street Preachers – "Empty Souls"
- Mariah Carey – "It's Like That", "We Belong Together", "Shake It Off", "Get Your Number"
- Max Graham – "Owner of a Lonely Heart" (vs. Yes)
- Maxïmo Park – "Apply Some Pressure", "Graffiti", "Going Missing"
- Melanie C – "Next Best Superstar"
- Moby – "Lift Me Up"
- Morning Runner – "Be All You Want Me to Be"
- Natalie Imbruglia – "Shiver", "Counting Down the Days"
- New Order – "Krafty"
- Nickelback – "Photograph"
- Nizlopi – "The JCB Song" [Acoustic version]
- Oasis – "Lyla", "The Importance of Being Idle", "Let There Be Love"
- The Ordinary Boys – "Boys Will Be Boys", "Life Will Be the Death of Me"
- Paul Weller – "From the Floorboards Up"
- Phantom Planet – "California"
- The Pussycat Dolls – "Don't Cha"
- Razorlight – "Somewhere Else"
- Ricky Martin – "I Don't Care"
- Rihanna – "Pon De Replay"
- Robbie Williams – "Tripping", "The Trouble with Me", "Advertising Space"
- Rob Thomas – "Lonely No More"
- Roll Deep – "The Avenue"
- Sean Paul – "We Be Burnin'"
- The Shapeshifters – "Back to Basics"
- Sheryl Crow – "Good Is Good"
- Simon Webbe – "Lay Your Hands"
- Simply Red – "Perfect Love"
- Son of Dork – "Ticket Outta Loserville"
- Starsailor – "In the Crossfire"
- Status Quo – "The Party Ain't Over Yet"
- Stereophonics – "Dakota"
- Stephen Fretwell – "New York"
- The Strokes – "Juicebox"
- The Subways – "No Goodbyes"
- Sugababes – "Push the Button", "Ugly"
- Super Furry Animals – "Lazer Beam"
- Supergrass – "St. Petersburg"
- The Tears – "Refugees"
- Texas – "Getaway"
- Tyler James – "Foolish"
- U2 – "Sometimes You Can't Make It on Your Own", "City of Blinding Lights"
- Westlife – "You Raise Me Up", "When You Tell Me That You Love Me"

== 2006 ==
- A-ha – "Analogue (All I Want)"
- The All-American Rejects – "Dirty Little Secret"
- Amy Winehouse – "Rehab"
- Arctic Monkeys – "I Bet You Look Good on the Dancefloor", "When the Sun Goes Down"
- The Automatic – "Raoul", "Monster"
- The Beautiful South – "Manchester"
- Belle and Sebastian – "Funny Little Frog", "The Blues Are Still Blue", "White Collar Boy"
- Beth Orton – "Conceived"
- Boy Kill Boy – "Back Again"
- Breaks Co-Op – "The Otherside"
- The Charlatans – "Blackened Blue Eyes"
- Chicane – "Stoned in Love" (feat. Tom Jones)
- Corinne Bailey Rae – "Put Your Records On", "Trouble Sleeping"
- The Crimea – "White Russian Galaxy"
- Cyndi Lauper – "Time After Time" [Acoustic version]
- Daniel Powter – "Lie to Me"
- The Darkness – "Is It Just Me?"
- Delays – "Valentine"
- Dirty Pretty Things – "Bang Bang You're Dead"
- Editors – "Munich"
- Embrace – "Nature's Law"
- Emma Bunton – "Downtown"
- Fall Out Boy – "Sugar, We're Going Down"
- Feeder – "Lost and Found"
- The Feeling – "Sewn", "Fill My Little World"
- The Flaming Lips – "The Yeah Yeah Yeah Song"
- Franz Ferdinand – "The Fallen", "Eleanor Put Your Boots On"
- The Fratellis – "Henrietta", "Flathead"
- The Futureheads – "Skip to the End"
- Gnarls Barkley – "Crazy"
- The Go! Team – "Ladyflash"
- Goldfrapp – "Ride a White Horse", "Fly Me Away"
- Goo Goo Dolls – "Better Days"
- Graham Coxon – "Standing on My Own Again", "You & I"
- Guillemots – "Made Up Lovesong #43"
- HIM – "Killing Loneliness"
- Infernal – "From Paris to Berlin"
- James Dean Bradfield – "That's No Way to Tell a Lie"
- James Morrison – "You Give Me Something" [Acoustic version]
- Jamie Cullum – "Photograph"
- Jamie Foxx – "Unpredictable", "Extravaganza"
- José González – "Heartbeats", "Crosses"
- Keane – "Is It Any Wonder?", "Crystal Ball", "A Bad Dream"
- The Kooks – "You Don't Love Me", "Naïve", "She Moves in Her Own Way"
- KT Tunstall – "Another Place to Fall"
- Kubb – "Grow"
- LeAnn Rimes – "And It Feels Like"
- Leona Lewis – "A Moment Like This"
- Lily Allen – "Smile"
- Lostprophets – "Rooftops (A Liberation Broadcast)"
- The Magic Numbers – "I See You, You See Me"
- Mary J. Blige – "One"
- Matt Willis – "Up All Night"
- Mattafix – "To & Fro"
- Maxïmo Park – "I Want You to Stay"
- McFly – "Don't Stop Me Now"
- Muse – "Supermassive Black Hole". "Starlight", "Map of the Problematique", "Invincible", and "Knights of Cydonia" [Live at Top of the Pops Special]
- Mystery Jets – "The Boy Who Ran Away"
- Nelly Furtado – "Maneater"
- Nerina Pallot – "Everybody's Gone to War"
- The Ordinary Boys – "Boys Will Be Boys", "Nine2Five" (vs. Lady Sovereign)
- Orson – "No Tomorrow", "Bright Idea"
- Paolo Nutini – "Last Request"
- Pet Shop Boys – "I'm With Stupid"
- Pink – "Stupid Girls"
- Placebo – "Because I Want You"
- Primal Scream – "Country Girl", "Dolls"
- The Pussycat Dolls – "Stickwitu", "Buttons"
- Ray LaMontagne – "Trouble"
- Razorlight – "In the Morning", "America"
- Red Hot Chili Peppers – "Dani California", "Tell Me Baby", "Snow (Hey Oh)"
- Richard Ashcroft – "Break the Night with Colour", "Why Not Nothing?"
- Rihanna – "SOS"
- Rogue Traders – "Voodoo Child"
- Sandi Thom – "I Wish I Was a Punk Rocker (With Flowers in My Hair)"
- Secret Machines – "Lightning Blue Eyes"
- Shakira – "Hips Don't Lie", "Don't Bother"
- Snow Patrol – "You're All I Have", "Chasing Cars"
- The Strokes – "Heart in a Cage", "You Only Live Once"
- Sugababes – "Red Dress", "I Bet You Look Good on the Dancefloor", "Follow Me Home"
- Westlife – "Amazing"
- Wolfmother – "Woman"
- Yeah Yeah Yeahs – "Gold Lion"
- The Zutons – "Why Won't You Give Me Your Love?", "Valerie"

== 2007 ==
- Girls Aloud – "Call the Shots"
- Leona Lewis – "Bleeding Love"
- Kaiser Chiefs – "Ruby"
- The Pigeon Detectives – "I Found Out"
- Katie Melua – "Have Yourself a Merry Little Christmas"
- M.I.A. – "Paper Planes"
- The Hoosiers – "Worried About Ray"
- Kate Nash – "Foundations"
- Robyn with Kleerup – "With Every Heartbeat"
- The Proclaimers – "I'm Gonna Be (500 Miles)"
- Westlife – "Total Eclipse of the Heart"

== 2008 ==
- Alexandra Burke – "Hallelujah"
- Girls Aloud – "The Promise"
- Leona Lewis – "Run"
- Take That – "Greatest Day"

== 2018 ==
- Jess Glynne – "I'll Be There"
- Clean Bandit ft. Kirsten Joy – "Solo"
- Jax Jones ft. Camille – "Breathe"
- Zara Larsson – "Ruin My Life" (Christmas Remix)
- Years & Years – "If You're Over Me"
- Tom Walker – "Leave a Light On"
- Rita Ora – "Let You Love Me"
- Freya Ridings – "Lost Without You"
- Sigrid – "Strangers"
- Jonas Blue ft. Liam Payne and Lennon Stella – "Polaroid"
- Rudimental ft. Jess Glynne and Dan Caplen – "These Days"
- George Ezra – "Shotgun"
- Jess Glynne – "Thursday"
- George Ezra- "Paradise"
- Jonas Blue with Jack & Jack – "Rise"
- Tom Grennan – "Found What I've Been Looking For"
- Mabel – "Fine Line"
- Jax Jones ft. Years & Years – "Play"
- Lewis Capaldi – "Grace"
- Sigrid – "Sucker Punch"
- Tom Odell ft. Rae Morris – "Half As Good As You"
- Clean Bandit ft. Kirsten Joy and Marina – "Baby"
- Christine and the Queens – "Girlfriend"

== 2019 ==
Christmas Day Special:

- Mabel – "Don't Call Me Up"
- James Blunt – "Cold"
- Jax Jones with Ella Henderson – "This Is Real"
- Jack Savoretti – "Christmas Morning"
- Sigala with Becky Hill – "Wish You Well"
- Lewis Capaldi – "Someone You Loved"
- Miley Cyrus with Billy Ray Cyrus and Lil Nas X – "Old Town Road" (Remix) (Live from Glastonbury Festival 2019)
- Labrinth – "Something's Got to Give"
- Dermot Kennedy – "Outnumbered"
- Joel Corry with Haley May – "Sorry"
- The Script – "The Last Time"
- AJ Tracey with Jorja Smith – "Ladbroke Grove"
- Tom Walker – "Just You and I"
- Freya Ridings – "Castles"
- Ladbaby – "I Love Sausage Rolls" (Pre-recorded music video) (2019 Christmas Number 1)
- O-Town – "After The Lights Go Out"

During the broadcast, the biggest hits of 2019 were revealed as: 10. "Señorita" by Shawn Mendes and Camila Cabello 9. "Piece of Your Heart" by Meduza and Goodboys 8. "Don't Call Me Up" by Mabel 7."Vossi Bop" by Stormzy 6. "Sweet but Psycho" by Ava Max 5. "Giant" by Calvin Harris and Rag'n'Bone Man 4. "Bad Guy" by Billie Eilish 3. "I Don't Care" by Ed Sheeran and Justin Bieber 2. "Old Town Road" (Remix) by Lil Nas X and Billy Ray Cyrus 1. "Someone You Loved" by Lewis Capaldi

== 2020 ==
Christmas Day Special:

- Joel Corry x MNEK – "Head and Heart"
- Celeste – "A Little Love"
- Harry Styles – "Watermelon Sugar" (Live on Later With Jools Holland)
- Clean Bandit and Mabel featuring 24kGoldn – "Tick Tock"
- Miley Cyrus – "Midnight Sky" (from Radio 1's Live Lounge)
- Becky Hill – "Better Off Without You"
- Jamie Cullum – "Turn On the Lights"
- Dua Lipa – "Don't Start Now" (Live on The Graham Norton Show)
- Aitch and AJ Tracey – "Rain"
- Ella Henderson – "Take Care of You"
- Live Lounge Allstars – "Times Like These"
- KSI featuring Craig David and Digital Farm Animals – "Really Love"
- Lewis Capaldi – "Before You Go" (Live from the 2019 Top of the Pops Christmas special)

During the broadcast, the biggest hits of 2020 were revealed as being: 10. "Watermelon Sugar by Harry Styles, 9. "Own It" by Stormzy featuring Ed Sheeran and Burna Boy, 8. "Someone You Loved" by Lewis Capaldi, 7. "Head and Heart" by Joel Corry x MNEK, 6. "Rockstar" by DaBaby featuring Roddy Ricch, 5. "Don't Start Now" by Dua Lipa, 4. "Before You Go" by Lewis Capaldi, 3. "Roses" by Saint Jhn, 2. "Dance Monkey" by Tones and I and 1. "Blinding Lights" by The Weeknd.

New Year's Eve Special:

- Sigala and James Arthur – "Lasting Lover"
- Sam Smith – "Diamonds" (from Smith's album release livestream)
- Becky Hill – "Space"
- Alicia Keys – "Underdog" (from Radio 1's Live Lounge)
- Yungblud – "Cotton Candy"
- Clean Bandit and Mabel featuring 24kGoldn – "Tick Tock" (rebroadcast)
- Wes Nelson featuring Hardy Caprio – "See Nobody"
- Arlo Parks – "Hurt"
- Nathan Dawe featuring KSI and Ella Henderson – "Lighter"
- Michael Kiwanuka – "Light" (Live on Later with Jools Holland)
- Alfie Templeman – "Forever Isn't Long Enough"
- LadBaby – "Don't Stop Me Eatin'" (Christmas Number 1)

During the broadcast, footage of The Big Night In and One World Together at Home were shown and demonstrated artists including Neil Diamond, Brandon Flowers, Liam Gallagher, Stefflon Don, Little Mix, Michael Ball and Captain Tom Moore, Ariana Grande and Justin Bieber, John Legend, Charli XCX, Miley Cyrus, Liam Payne, Haim, Dizzee Rascal and Sophie Ellis-Bextor and made music and connected with their fans during the COVID-19 pandemic which put a halt to touring. The show also touched on how artists such as Jorja Smith, H.E.R. and Stormzy responded to the murder of George Floyd and supported the Black Lives Matter movement through their music and celebrated chart achievements by Ariana Grande, BTS, Michael Kiwanuka, Billie Eilish, Dame Shirley Bassey, The Rolling Stones, Kylie Minogue and Taylor Swift.

== See also ==
- List of songs banned by the BBC
