= Unleashed (Dannii Minogue album) =

2007 compilation album by Dannii Minogue

Compilation album by Dannii Minogue
- Released: 5 November 2007
- Recorded: 1997–2004
- Genre: Dance; pop
- Label: Rhino; Warner Music UK
- Producer: Brian Higgins; Matt Gray; Roger Sanchez; Thomas Gustafsson; Hugo Lira; Ian-Paolo Lira; Neimo; Metro; Gareth Young; Pascal Gabriel; Thriller Jill; Bey Lukkem; Riva; Korpi & Blackcell; Jean Claude Ades; Ian Masterson; Terry Ronald; Pete Martin; Twin

Dannii Minogue chronology
The Hits & Beyond (2006)	Unleashed (2007)	Club Disco (2007)

Professional ratings
Review scores
Source	Rating
AllMusic	4/5 stars

Unleashed is a compilation album by Australian dance-pop singer Dannii Minogue. It was released by Rhino Entertainment and Warner Music UK on 5 November 2007. As this was a budget release compilation, it was ineligible for the UK Albums Chart.

== Album history ==
The album contains unreleased tracks and remixes personally chosen by the singer. Commenting on the album's release, Minogue said, "This album is about my personal favourites – bringing you the best unreleased material, including club mixes that were number one and songs I've written with my favourite producers around the world."

The new material for the album was recorded in 2003 and 2004 for what was to be the follow-up to Neon Nights with London Records, except "Blame It On the Music" and "Viva L'Amour", which were recorded during the Neon Nights sessions. "Viva L'amour" was released as an iTunes bonus track and was given a physical release when released with Neon Nights 20 in June 2023.

The original track listing as advertised on play.com featured four additional tracks – "Weak", "Fear of Flying", "Karma Is a Bitch" and "Healing on the Dancefloor", composed by Swedish production duo Korpi & Blackcell, which disappeared from the final release for unknown reasons. The four tracks eventually leaked on SoundCloud in September 2011.

== Track listing ==
No.	Title	Writer(s)	Producer(s)	Length
1.	"All I Wanna Do" (Innocent Girl Mix)	Brian Higgins; Matt Gray; Stuart McLennan; Tim Powell	Higgins; Gray	4:43
2.	"Blame It on the Music"	Dannii Minogue; Roger Sanchez; Terry Ronald	Sanchez	3:52
3.	"Spend Your Love on Me"	Minogue; T. Djafari; Hugo Lira; Thomas Gustafsson	Gustafsson; H. Lira; Ian-Paolo Lira	3:35
4.	"Don't Wanna Lose This Feeling" (Jewels & Stone 7" Mix)	Minogue; Bruno Alexandre; Camille Troillard; James Khari; Matthieu Joly; Terry Ronald	Neïmo; Jewels & Stone^{[a]}	3:35
5.	"Going Going Gone"	Minogue; Djafari; H. Lira; I. Lira	Gustafsson; H. Lira; I. Lira	3:05
6.	"Everything I Wanted" (Metro 7" Mix)	Minogue; Mark Taylor; Steve Torch	Metro	3:58
7.	"Undeniable"	Minogue; Sara Eker; George Young; Cheryl Parker	Young	3:15
8.	"No Romeo"	Minogue; Hannah Robinson; Pascal Gabriel	Gabriel	3:35
9.	"Hide and Seek" (Thriller Jill Original Radio Mix)	Minogue; Ian Masterson; Ronald	Thriller Jill	3:06
10.	"Hurt in Love"	Minogue; Ronald; Ross Cullum	Bey Lukkem	4:09
11.	"Who Do You Love Now?" (Riva's Bora Bora Edit)	Horst Pulmann; Gus Van Vlaanderen; Victoria Horn	Riva	4:33
12.	"Put the Needle on It" (Cicada Vocal Mix Edit)	Minogue; Henrik Korpi; Mathias Johansson; Karen Poole	Korpi & Blackcell; Cicada^{[a]}	4:06
13.	"Come and Get It" (Alternative Radio Cut)	Minogue; Robinson; Jean Claude Ades	Ades	3:12
14.	"Begin to Spin Me Round" (Radio Edit) (Dannii vs. Dead or Alive)	Dacia Bridges; Olaf Kramolowsky; Ades; Pete Burns; Mike Percy; Steve Coy; Tim Lever	Masterson	3:15
15.	"Love Me Like This"	Minogue; Djafari; H. Lira; Gustafsson	Gustafsson; H. Lira; I. Lira	3:21
16.	"Bad Weather"	Minogue; Masterson; Ronald; Joe Holweger; Ben Dobie	Thriller Jill	3:05
17.	"Invitation"	Minogue; Eker; Young; Parker	Young	3:47
18.	"It Won't Work Out" (Ross Cullum Single Mix)	Minogue; Masterson; Ronald	Masterson; Ronald; Pete Martin; Lukkem^{[a]}	4:17

iTunes edition (bonus track)
No.	Title	Writer(s)	Producer(s)	Length
19.	"Viva L'Amour"	Chippe Carlsson; David Kreuger; Jörgen Elofsson; Nicklas Olausson	Masterson; Ronald	3:06

Notes

- ^{^[a]} signifies an additional producer and remixer.
- The compilation's original tracklist featured the songs "Healing on the Dancefloor" as track 6, "Fear of Flying" as track 7, "Karma Is a Bitch" as track 9 and "Weak" as track 13. Additionally, "Undeniable" was absent.

== Release history ==
Release history and formats for Unleashed
Country	Release date	Format	Cat. no.
United Kingdom	5 November 2007	CD	5144-25205-2

== Cancelled The Platinum Collection album ==
The Platinum Collection

Compilation album by Dannii Minogue
- Released: Cancelled
- Genre: Dance, pop
- Label: Rhino, Warner Music UK
- Producer: Various

The Platinum Collection was originally planned for release in 2006 by Minogue's former label Warner Bros. Records, as part of a series of back catalogue compilations released for other artists on their roster. However, it was cancelled due to Warner Music attempting to release the album with material contained within Minogue's severance deal with London Records. It was replaced with the release of her second greatest hits album The Hits & Beyond later in 2006, plus Unleashed a year later.

=== Planned track listing ===
1. "All I Wanna Do" (radio version)
2. "Everything I Wanted" (album version)
3. "Disremembrance" (Flexifingers Radio Edit)
4. "Coconut"
5. "Heaven Can Wait" (7" mix)
6. "Someone New" (7" version)
7. "Est-ce que tu m'aimes encore?" (Riva featuring Dannii)
8. "Put the Needle on It" (radio edit)
9. "Begin to Spin Me Round" (radio edit)
10. "Don't Wanna Lose This Groove" (radio edit)
11. "It Won't Work Out" (single mix)
12. "Come and Get It" (alternative radio version)
13. "Blame It on the Music"
14. "Tut Tut (Does Your Mother Know?)"
15. "Undeniable"
16. "Karma Is a Bitch"
17. "Viva L'amour"
18. "Each Finger Has an Attitude"
19. "It Won't Work Out" (acoustic version)
