= Sundown (S Club 8 album) =

Studio album by S Club 8
- Released: 13 October 2003
- Genre: Pop
- Length: 60:12
- Label: Polydor

S Club 8 chronology
Together (2002)	Sundown (2003)	Welcome to Avalon Heights (2004)

Singles from Sundown
- 1. "Fool No More" Released: 30 June 2003; 2. "Sundown" Released: 29 September 2003; 3. "Don't Tell Me You're Sorry" Released: 29 December 2003

Sundown is the second and final album by the British pop group S Club 8 (previously known as S Club Juniors). It was released in 2003 and went to number 13 on the UK Albums Chart.

The track "One Thing I Know" was co-written by the former Spice Girl Emma Bunton, who also provided backing vocals. The title track was also released by another 19 Management act, American Juniors.

The album contains two cover songs: "Pretty Boy", originally performed by Norwegian duo M2M and "Tears on My Pillow", originally performed by American band Little Anthony and the Imperials.

== Track listing ==
No.	Title	Writer(s)	Producer(s)	Length
1.	"Fool No More"	Ian Curnow; Georgie Dennis; Ricky Hanley; Darren Woodford	Jewels & Stone	3:28
2.	"Sundown"	Pelle Ankarberg; Andreas Mattsson; Niclas Molinder; Joacim Persson	Twin, Ankarberg	4:06
3.	"Don't Tell Me You're Sorry"	Lisa Greene; Henrik Korpi; Henrik Janson; Mathias Johansson	Korpi & Blackcell	3:41
4.	"Love to the Limit"	Dennis; Hanley; Woodford	Jewels & Stone	3:41
5.	"Turn the Lights On"	Mikael Andersson; Anders Bergström	Bergström, Patrik Ohlsson	3:56
6.	"Searching for Perfection"	Tim Lever; Mike Percy; Hannah Robinson	Lever, Percy	3:56
7.	"One Thing I Know"	Emma Bunton; Lever; Percy	Lever, Percy	4:00
8.	"Sail On Through"	Adrian Bushby; Robinson	Jewels & Stone	3:54
9.	"Big Fun"	Lonnie Simmons; Rudy Taylor	Jewels & Stone	3:22
10.	"Day You Came"	Dennis; Lever; Percy	Lever, Percy	4:14
11.	"Pretty Boy"	Bottolf Lødemel; Nora Skaug	Ronny Janssen	4:40
12.	"Rush"	Dennis; Lever; Percy	Lever, Percy	4:00
13.	"I Just Came to Dance"	Lever; Percy; Sean Philips	Lever, Percy	4:06
14.	"Drawn to You"	Cathy Dennis; Ian Allen; Kieran Bass; Mark Bass; Nathan Bass	Yak Bondy	3:51
15.	"Tears on My Pillow"	Sylvester Bradford; Al Lewis	Jewels & Stone	2:17
16.	"Don't Tell Me You're Sorry" (single mix)	Greene; Korpi; Janson; Johansson	Korpi & Blackcell	3:19

== Charts ==
Chart (2003)	Peak position
Scottish Albums (Official Charts)	11
UK Albums (Official Charts)	13

== Certifications ==
Region	Certification	Certified units/sales
United Kingdom (BPI)	Silver	60,000^{*}
^{*} Sales figures based on certification alone.
