= No More Days to Waste =

No More Days to Waste may refer to:

- No More Days to Waste (song), a 2009 song by Aloha from Hell
- No More Days to Waste (album), a 2009 album by Aloha from Hell
