= Look on the Floor (Hypnotic Tango) =

Single by Bananarama

from the album Drama
- B-side: "Live in the Sun"
- Released: 7 November 2005
- Genre: Dance-pop
- Label: A&G
- Songwriters: Sara Dallin; Keren Woodward; H. Korpi; M. Wollo; M. Malavasi; S. Micheli
- Producer: Korpi & Blackcell

Bananarama singles chronology
"Move in My Direction" (2005)	"Look on the Floor" (2005)	"Love Comes" (2009)

"Look on the Floor" is a song by the English girl group Bananarama, released in November 2005 as the second single from their ninth album Drama. The song was written by Sara Dallin, Keren Woodward, H. Korpi, M. Wollo, M. Malavasi and S. Micheli, and was produced by Korpi and BlackCell. Contained in "Look on the Floor" is an interpolation of the chorus of the 1983 Italo disco song "Hypnotic Tango" by My Mine.

"Look on the Floor" peaked at number 26 in the United Kingdom, where it became their twenty-fifth – and, to date, final – top 40 single. Later in the year it was released internationally and peaked at number twelve on the Spanish singles chart.

Although the single was not released in the United States, it peaked at number two on the U.S. Hot Dance Club Play chart strictly based on nightclub play of the import single (a rare occurrence for the U.S. dance chart), becoming Bananarama's biggest club hit since "Venus" in 1986. "Look on the Floor" soon caught on to radio, peaking at number five on the Hot Dance Airplay chart. The dance chart success of this single prompted an official release in the United States of Bananarama's previous single "Move in My Direction" in August 2006.

The Angel City remix of the song was included on the soundtrack to You Don't Mess with the Zohan.

== Music video ==
The music video features Dallin and Woodward shot in an all white studio with an arrangement of white boxes and cylinders. Their scenes are intercut with a dance performance by three male dancers in front of mirrors. It was directed by Tim Royes.

== Formats and track listings ==
These are the formats and track listings of major single releases of "Look on the Floor".

UK CD single #1

1. "Look on the Floor (Hypnotic Tango)"
2. "Live in the Sun"

UK CD single #2

1. "Look on the Floor (Hypnotic Tango)" (Radio edit) – 3:28
2. "Look on the Floor (Hypnotic Tango)" (Solasso remix) – 6:43
3. "Look on the Floor (Hypnotic Tango)" (Soul Seekerz remix) – 7:29
  Remixed by Julian Napolitano, Simon Langford & Andrew Galea
4. "Look on the Floor (Hypnotic Tango)" (Angel City Alternative Radio edit)
  Remixed by Hugo Zentveld (a.k.a. DJ Renegade) & Aldwin Oomen
5. "Look on the Floor (Hypnotic Tango)" (Yomanda remix) – 7:33
  Remixed by Paul Masterson
6. "Look on the Floor (Hypnotic Tango)" music video

UK DVD single

1. "Look on the Floor (Hypnotic Tango)"

Australian CD single

1. "Look on the Floor (Hypnotic Tango)" (Radio edit) – 3:28
2. "Look on the Floor (Hypnotic Tango)" (Angel City Extended Remix) – 5:45
  Remixed by Hugo Zentveld (a.k.a. DJ Renegade) & Aldwin Oomen
3. "Look on the Floor (Hypnotic Tango)" (Solasso Remix) – 6:43
4. "Look on the Floor (Hypnotic Tango)" (Yomanda Remix) – 7:33
  Remixed by Paul Masterson
5. "Look on the Floor (Hypnotic Tango)" (Soul Seekerz Remix) – 7:29
  Remixed by Julian Napolitano, Simon Langford & Andrew Galea
6. "Look on the Floor (Hypnotic Tango)" (Solasso Remix Dub) – 5:51
7. "Look on the Floor (Hypnotic Tango)" (Soul Seekerz Remix Dub) – 7:29
  Remixed by Julian Napolitano, Simon Langford & Andrew Galea
8. "Look on the Floor (Hypnotic Tango)" (Yomanda Remix Dub) – 7:32
  Remixed by Paul Masterson

== Charts ==
=== Weekly charts ===
Chart (2005–2006)	Peak position
Australia (ARIA)	95
Ireland (IRMA)	46
Scotland Singles (OCC)	23
Spain (Promusicae)	12
UK Singles (OCC)	26
US Dance Club Songs (Billboard)	2
US Dance/Mix Show Airplay (Billboard)	5

=== Year-end charts ===
Chart (2006)	Position
US Dance Club Songs (Billboard)	41
