= Put the Needle on It =

2002 single by Dannii Minogue

Single by Dannii Minogue

from the album Neon Nights
- Released: 4 November 2002
- Recorded: 2002
- Genre: Dance-pop; electronica
- Length: 3:23
- Label: London; Warner; Ultra
- Songwriters: Dannii Minogue; Mathias Johansson; Henrik Korpi; Karen Poole
- Producer: Korpi & Blackcell

Dannii Minogue singles chronology
"Who Do You Love Now?" (2001)	"Put the Needle on It" (2002)	"I Begin to Wonder" (2003)

Music video
- "Put the Needle on It" on YouTube

"Put the Needle on It" is a song performed by Australian singer Dannii Minogue, which was written by Minogue, Mathias Johansson, Henrik Korpi and Karen Poole for Minogue's fourth album Neon Nights (2003). It is the opening track, and was released as its lead single on 4 November 2002. It reached the top twenty on the Australian, Irish and United Kingdom Singles Charts. In the UK it also topped the club charts. In 2003, it was certified gold by the Australian Recording Industry Association indicating shipment of 35,000 units.

"Put the Needle on It" is a dance-pop song which received positive reviews from music critics. Its music video, directed by Miikka Lommi, features Minogue in a studio surrounded with colourful neon lights and spinning on a human-sized record player.

== Background and writing ==
In 2002, Minogue began writing and recording material for her fourth album, Neon Nights (2003), with Mathias Johansson (aka Mathias Wollo), Henrik Korpi, and previous collaborator Karen Poole in Stockholm, Sweden. During one of their sessions, they wrote "Put the Needle on It", a song about sex. Minogue was determined to compose a dance music song to thank United Kingdom DJs. They had accepted her into that genre following the success of her previous year's single, "Who Do You Love Now?". In the UK, it is difficult for artists to be accepted into the dance music scene because DJs are usually not "interested in pop artists calling themselves dance artists because they've done one remix of their song".

"Put the Needle on It" is a mid-tempo 1980s inspired disco song "about sex disguised as a pop ditty about a record player". The song was composed as a collaborative effort between Korpi, Johansson, Poole and Minogue, although Minogue contributed most of the lyrics. The song is written in the common verse-chorus form and features instrumentation from keyboards and synthesisers.

In 2010 Turkish singer Mercan released a cover version in her native language called “Sana değil kardeşine” (English: "Not you brother").

== Reception ==
=== Critical reception ===
"Put the Needle on It" received positive reviews from contemporary pop music critics. Cristín Leach of RTÉ Entertainment compared the song's musical style to American pop singer Madonna, while Amazon.com's David Trueman wrote that the song "utilises the funkier end of 1980s disco, with a contemporary edge that removes the cheese and dispels any notion that [Minogue] may be hanging on the coattails of her big sister (Kylie Minogue)". MusicOMH's Alexis Kirke called the track a "slow but inevitable grower" which "shows that Dannii's dark song-writing powers can compete right at the top of the charts".

=== Chart performance ===
"Put the Needle on It" was released in the United Kingdom on 4 November 2002. It reached number seven on the UK Singles Chart and number one on the Upfront Club Chart, becoming Minogue's fifth song to top the club chart. Across Europe, the track performed moderately well, reaching the top twenty in Ireland and top thirty in the Netherlands It also reached number four on the Irish Dance Charts. "Put the Needle on It" peaked at number eleven on the Australian Singles Chart. In 2003, the song was certified gold by the Australian Recording Industry Association indicating shipment of 35,000 units. On the ARIA End of Year Charts for 2003, the track appeared at number eleven on the Dance Singles Chart and at number eighteen on the Top Australian Singles Chart.

== Music video ==
The music video featured Minogue in a colourful digital room.

"Put the Needle on It" features a futuristic music video that was directed by Miikka Lommi in 2002. The video features Minogue in a studio surrounded with colourful neon lights and spinning on a human-sized record player. The video begins with a close-up on a television screen showing only Minogue's lips, singing the opening lines. A large, human-sized record player is then shown, surrounded by large video screens repeating the opening scene of the video. Minogue, wearing a short black dress and a cropped hair cut, is then shown in a digital room, surrounded by many lights and occasionally four digital dancers. She is also shown grinding in the corner of the digital room with her back to it while shimmering transparent hands from the walls are seen caressing her provocatively. The final sequence of the video features Minogue in a purple dress, spinning on the large record player introduced at the beginning. As the video concludes, all of the scenes are inter-cut and gradually fade.

A music video for a remix version was also created using the Jason Nevins' "Club Creation Edit" of the song. The remix video used only the scenes of Minogue in the digital room and spinning around on the record player, but they are arranged in a different order than how they appear in the original video. The music video was released commercially on The Hits & Beyond special edition companion DVD (2006) and Dannii Minogue: The Video Collection (2007). The latter included a short film, "Put the Needle on It (Behind the Scenes)", detailing the production of the track and its video.

== Formats and track listings ==
European CD single (5050466191625)

1. "Put the Needle on It" (Radio Version) – 3:24
2. "Put the Needle on It" (Nevins Club Creation edit) – 3:58
3. "Put the Needle on It" (Cicada Vocal mix edit) – 4:07
4. "Put the Needle on It" (Extended original) – 7:22
5. "Put the Needle on It" (Tiga's Cookies dub edit) – 4:49
6. "Put the Needle on It" (Laid's Zoo Brazil edit) – 5:41

European 12-inch single (5050466196309)

1. "Put the Needle on It" (Extended original) – 7:22
2. "Put the Needle on It" (Tiga's Cookies dub edit) – 4:49
3. "Put the Needle on It" (Nevins Club Creation) – 8:21
4. "Put the Needle on It" (Cicada Vocal mix edit) – 4:07

Cassette single

1. "Put the Needle on It" (Radio Version) – 3:24
2. "Put the Needle on It" (Mute8 Vocal edit) – 4:04

Official remixes

1. "Put the Needle on It" (Original Extended) – 8:05
2. "Put the Needle on It" (Cicada Vocal mix) – 7:56

== Personnel ==
Personnel are lifted from the CD single liner notes.

- Dannii Minogue – lead vocals
- Karen Poole – backing vocals
- Korpi & Blackcell – production, arrangement
- Jonas Östman – engineering
- Niklas Flyckt – mixing

== Charts ==
Weekly chart performance for "Put the Needle on It"
Chart (2002)	Peak position
Australia (ARIA)	11
Belgium (Ultratop 50 Flanders)	29
Belgium (Ultratip Bubbling Under Wallonia)	8
Europe (Eurochart Hot 100)	34
Germany (GfK)	78
Ireland (IRMA)	20
Netherlands (Single Top 100)	30
Scottish Singles Sales (Official Charts)	8
UK Singles (Official Charts)	7
UK Upfront Club Chart	1
