= Neon Nights =

- Standard edition artwork

Studio album by Dannii Minogue
- Released: 17 March 2003
- Recorded: 2001–2003
- Genre: Dance-pop; electropop; nu-disco; house
- Length: 56:42
- Label: London (UK); Ultra Records (US)
- Producer: Ian Masterson; Korpi & Blackcell; Neïmo; Terry Ronald; Jean-Claude Ades; Jewels & Stone; Gil Cang; Jock-E

Dannii Minogue chronology
The Remixes (1998)	Neon Nights (2003)	The Hits & Beyond (2006)

Alternative cover
- Deluxe edition

Singles from Neon Nights
- 1. "Who Do You Love Now?" Released: 19 November 2001; 2. "Put the Needle on It" Released: 4 November 2002; 3. "I Begin to Wonder" Released: 3 March 2003; 4. "Don't Wanna Lose This Feeling" Released: 9 June 2003

Neon Nights is the fourth studio album by Australian singer Dannii Minogue. It was released through London Records on 17 March 2003. Spurred by her success with the 2001 single "Who Do You Love Now?", Minogue signed a new record contract and began working on her first album in six years with the likes of Ian Masterson, Korpi & Blackcell, Neïmo and Terry Ronald.

The effort culminated in a dance-pop record largely influenced by 1980s music and the European club scene. Neon Nights became the most successful album campaign of Minogue's career, peaking at number eight in the United Kingdom and spawning four top-ten singles in the territory, including "Put the Needle on It" and "I Begin to Wonder".

Neon Nights received generally positive reviews from music critics, who praised its cohesion and mixture of styles; it has come to be regarded as a cult classic among pop music fans. Minogue went on a limited tour in support of the album, which included a one-off show in New York City. Neon Nights has been reissued twice since its release, marking its 15th and 20th anniversaries.

== Background and recording ==
Despite producing a top-five hit with 1997's "All I Wanna Do", Minogue was dropped by record label Warner Brothers after her third studio album Girl became a commercial disappointment, and she saw herself as effectively retired from the music industry. She appeared in productions of Macbeth and Notre-Dame de Paris during this time.

"Sometimes you need that bushfire to clear the slate and regenerate. We all get to know—when we've got enough years behind us—when you need to firmly shut a door for a very different one to open. It was like that. I was at peace with everything being finished."

In 2001, DJ Pete Tong approached her to record vocals for the trance instrumental "Stringer" by DJ duo Riva, which was becoming a hit in European clubs. The track became "Who Do You Love Now?", which peaked at number three on the UK Singles Chart in late November and remains her longest-charting entry, spending 16 weeks on the chart; in Australia, the song peaked at number fifteen.

The single's success led to a six-album record deal with London Records, a subsidiary of Warner Music, and work on a new album soon began with London giving Minogue free rein of its production. Minogue turned 30 while recording the album, a milestone that she wanted to celebrate with Neon Nights and reflect her positive mindset as a time capsule.

Minogue worked on the album in London, Paris, and Stockholm, and was majorly involved with the songwriting process, having writing credits on 12 of the 15 tracks on the standard edition. Longtime collaborator Terry Ronald accompanied her on many of the songwriting trips. The recording process commenced in 2002 at Murlyn Studios, a cabin located in the outskirts of Stockholm. She first met with Henrik Korpi and Mathias Johansson, better known as Korpi & Blackcell, and Karen Poole; the four wrote three of the tracks on Neon Nights, including opener "Put the Needle on It".

The French indie rock band Neïmo became involved with the album after sending several backing ideas to Masterson. In Paris, their studio was a living room outfitted with vintage music equipment, with Minogue's vocals recorded in a spare bedroom. She and Ronald finished three tracks with the band. Their third time in Paris, in May 2002, became the pair's last writing trip together as Ronald later started chemotherapy. Ronald is a co-writer on six Neon Nights tracks, and survived his cancer diagnosis.

== Composition ==
Neon Nights is a dance-pop album with a prominent early 1980s music and French house direction, capturing the European dance zeitgeist of the early 2000s. Minogue recounted that Neon Nights was the first time she had a major involvement in writing any album, from the lyrics to its production. Her blueprint was to translate the underground club scene into an accessible format; essentially a record that sounded like remixes of pop songs. As a result, Neon Night pulls from an eclectic assortment of genres including electro, house, funk and R&B. The album was described by David Trueman of Amazon as "[dripping] with sleazy synth-funk and production risks unheard of in polished pop music".

"Dance music is such a huge passion of mine, so [the production process] was a dream. I wanted to hear the songs and feel, as I closed my eyes, that I'm on a dance floor, in the club, under a mirror ball. That's what that album is for me. In fact, that's why we called it Neon Nights—it just had to be something that felt like when you're at a glitzy party with your dancing shoes on."

The initial output from Neon Nights mimicked the trance sound of "Who Do You Love Now?", a brief discarded early on, whose vestiges appear in the closer "It Won't Work Out"—later retooled into a flamenco-tinged trip hop ballad. "Mystified" was one of the first tracks to be finished for Neon Nights which helped to mold the album's electropop template, while the band Neïmo influenced its sonic palette with a pared-down "tough electro-punk sound". "Put the Needle on It", the opener, and "A Piece of Time" are both electroclash songs that convey this underground element; the former has been compared to Donna Summer, while the latter to Daft Punk and Miss Kittin. "On the Loop" continues this experimentation with the use of distortion.

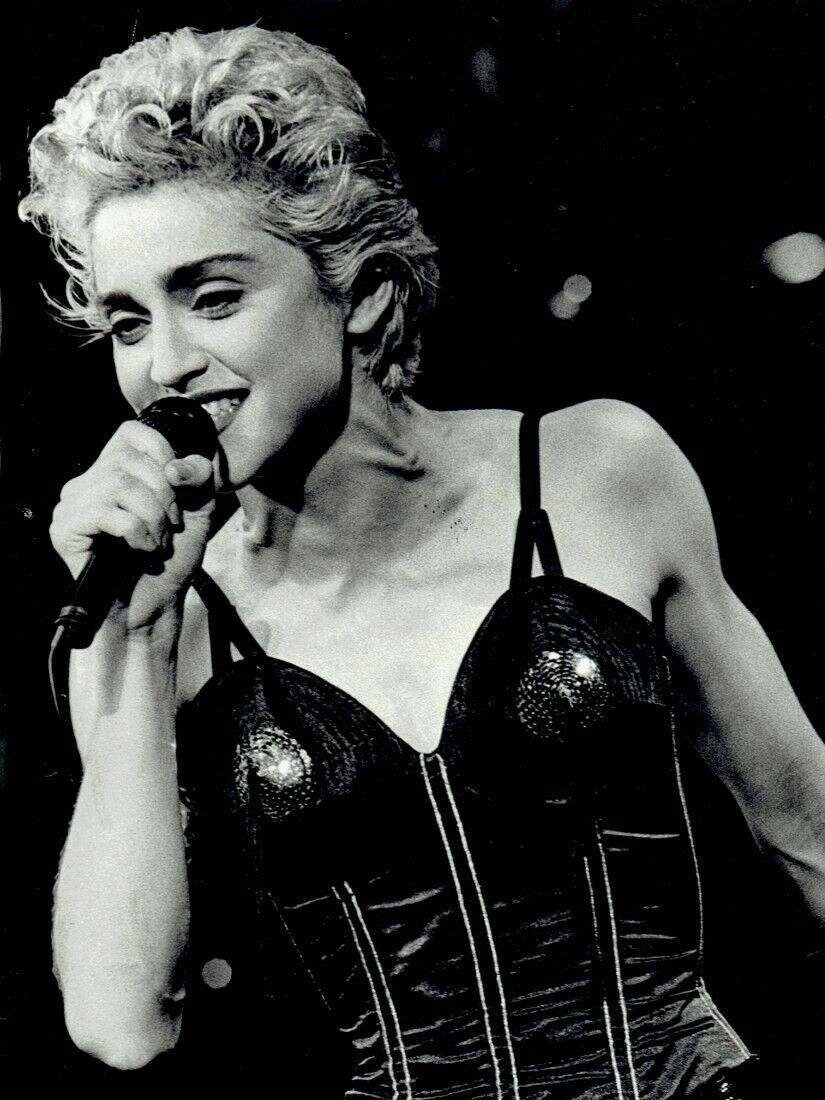
Madonna (pictured in 1987) served as an inspiration for album, who later approved her song "Into the Groove" for a mash-up treatment.

Critics have identified post-disco as a prominent influence throughout Neon Nights, from the aforementioned "Put the Needle on It", to "Creep" and "Mighty Fine". Music writer Quentin Harrison described the former two as pulling from American aesthetics in channeling electro-funk, R&B and hip hop. Jack Smith from BBC Music likened "Mighty Fine" to the P-Funk style. The record evolves into eurodisco on the "dark and gritty" "I Begin to Wonder" and its "dreamier" counterpart, "Come and Get It". Elsewhere, "For the Record" and "Don't Wanna Lose This Feeling" are pure pop songs.

Minogue also drew inspiration from artists she listened to in her youth including Madonna, Scritti Politti, and Kraftwerk. The album utilizes several samples: "Mighty Fine" features the 1980 song "Thighs High (Grip Your Hips and Move)" by Tom Browne, and Prince-influenced "Push" borrows from the 1983 song "White Horse" by Laid Back. As mashups gained traction in the early 2000s, "I Begin to Wonder" and "Don't Wanna Lose This Feeling" were augmented for promotional use, blended with "You Spin Me Round (Like a Record)" (1984) by Dead or Alive and "Into the Groove" (1985) by Madonna, respectively.

The album's lyrical themes revolve around romance and sex. "Put the Needle on It" is innuendo-laden, and "Vibe On" is about vibrators, reportedly an inside joke from the 1997 film Private Parts where a woman straddles a speaker between her legs. Critics have noted that Minogue infuses the record with a "sultry" and "sleazy" persona, with John Lucas of AllMusic writing that she is "sexually charged but smart and slightly aloof". Alexis Kirke of MusicOMH made the case for Minogue as the inverse of her older sister Kylie: "There's a Dark Willow in Buffy, a Dark Phoenix in the X-Men – and there is also a "Dark Kylie". Dark Kylie exudes more of a night-time sexuality than Kylie herself." Kirke and Smith described her vocals as "powerful", which Minogue credits her stint on the musical Notre-Dame de Paris with developing.

== Release and artwork ==
The album was released in the United Kingdom and Europe on 17 March 2003. It was handled by London Records in all territories except for the United States, where its 7 October 2003 release was through Ultra Records. Neon Nights was Minogue's first album to be green-lit stateside since Love and Kisses in 1991. An official "bootleg" edition was made available in Australia in 2003, notably substituting "I Begin to Wonder" and "Don't Wanna Lose This Feeling" with its mash-up counterparts; this edition was later re-issued alongside Neon Nights 20.

The cover photograph for Neon Nights was taken by Matthew Donaldson. Its minimalist composition sees Minogue against a white backdrop, propping herself up from the floor with one leg extended and reaching for her shoe: "[I]t was like, there's a white board, just lie on it and roll about and we'll see what we come up with. There was a freedom to it and we wanted it to feel like an outtake from Studio 54 or something." It was particularly inspired by a photograph of actress Liza Minnelli crawling on the floor at the aforementioned nightclub. Minogue said that its laidback approach was due to her camera shyness. Rob Copesy of Official Charts called the artwork "strangely brilliant", while Ron Slomowicz of About.com compared it to Calvin Klein—"slice of life, like a bedroom photographer".

Neon Night has seen three separate re-issues. A 2007 deluxe edition had made the album into a 33-track double disc.

In March 2018, as part of the celebration of Neon Nights' 15th anniversary, Minogue announced a special reissue of the album on streaming, CD and, for the first time, on a limited edition 180g pink and blue double vinyl. While the digital and CD versions followed the same tracklisting of the Deluxe Edition released on 2007, the double colored vinyl featured a slightly revised selection of bonus tracks, most notably omitting the B-side "Nervous".

Another reissue of the album, Neon Nights 20 boasted over 100 tracks across seven CDs.

== Promotion ==
=== Tour dates ===
List of tour dates
Date	City	Country	Venue
Europe
28 April 2003	London	United Kingdom	Hackney Empire
6 July 2003	London	United Kingdom	Party in the Park
27 July 2003	Glasgow	United Kingdom	Hampden Park
3 August 2003	Cork	Ireland	Guinness Michelstown Festival
North America
24 September 2003	New York City	United States	Webster Hall
Europe
25 August 2004	Athens	Greece	MTV Beach Beats
28 August 2004	Istanbul	Turkey	Club Laila
23 October 2004	London	United Kingdom	G-A-Y Astoria

== Commercial performance ==
Neon Nights became Minogue's most successful album release, reaching number eight in the United Kingdom, selling 23,500 copies first week, And was certified Gold. In Australia the album was initially a moderate success, reaching #25 on the albums chart. However, when re-issued for its 20th year anniversary, the album reached a new peak of #17 - the highest position for any of Minogue's albums, besting the chart position of her debut album in 1990. The album was also nominated for Best Pop Release at the 2003 ARIA Music Awards, making it Minogue's only ARIA nomination to date.

== Critical reception ==
Professional ratings
Review scores
Source	Rating
About.com	3.5/5 stars
AllMusic	4/5 stars
Blender	3/5 stars

Neon Nights was met with generally favourable reviews from music critics. John Lucas of AllMusic felt that it was the "most confident and forward-thinking release yet for Dannii" and commended the album's cohesion; its variety of influences notwithstanding. Similarly, Jack Smith from BBC Music called it "a pleasant cocktail of pop sophistication, club culture and accessibility". The album was highlighted by Billboard with Keith Caulfield writing, "Neon Nights is full of unabashedly fun, well-crafted, pure dance songs. Clubgoers and pop fans will eat this album up, and nearly every track would work at top 40 radio." Similarly, Music Week called it a "winning mix of pop and club". In a positive review, Alexis Kirke contrasted Minogue with her older sister: "[Kylie] is in danger of being engulfed and surpassed by her darker side."

Ron Slomowicz of About.com, who was a fan of Minogue's prior output, felt that the album "starts out amazingly" with "massive club hits", but criticized its middle section as "[wandering] into a murky area of 80's throwback-inspired retreads". However, he felt that Minogue had the complete package as a pop star. Writing for RTÉ, Cristín Leach gave high praises to "I Begin to Wonder" and "Push", which the album's more "bland" material helped to elevate, and felt that Minogue was still "on her way" in carving an identity distinct from her sister's. In other mixed reviews, critics opined that the material on Neon Nights was generic. Karen Bliss from Tribute wrote that the album is "full of average booty-shaking dance tracks, good for the moment, but nothing memorable," though "It Won't Work Out" was highlighted as a "beautiful, earnest ballad". Kristina Feliciano of Entertainment Weekly echoed this sentiment and felt that Minogue "[needed] some of her big sister's cheekiness" on a set of "dance-floor trifles that's passable (especially "Put the Needle on It") but not very memorable."

Retrospective reviews of Neon Nights were predominately positive. Writing for The Arts Desk, Thomas H. Green found it to be "a sassy and bouncy surprise" full of "chewy, invigorated club-pop, imaginatively constructed". Peter Piatkowski of PopMatters called it a "minor classic" that "displayed an artistry that Minogue hadn't shown before". Quentin Harrison of Albumism outlined Minogue's "club siren transformation" and commented that "Neon Nights remains a distinct dance-pop marker". Mike Wass of Idolator wrote that "it's one thing to create an excellent three-and-a-half-minute dance-pop song, but another to sustain the appeal over an entire album. Kylie managed it with Fever, Madonna followed suit on Confessions on a Dance Floor. Dannii's contribution to the genre is every bit as good as those classics."

== 20th anniversary reissue ==
On 1 April 2023, Minogue confirmed the deluxe, expanded anniversary issue of Neon Nights would be released later in 2023. On 16 June 2023, Minogue released Neon Nights 20; the 33-track album was made available on all digital outlets and CD and vinyl. The reissue release saw the album re-chart at number 17 in Australia, higher than the original issue's peak of 25, and number 55 in the UK.

== Track listing ==
=== Original release ===
Standard edition
No.	Title	Writer(s)	Producer(s)	Length
1.	"Put the Needle on It"	Henrik Korpi, Mathias Johansson, Karen Poole, Dannii Minogue	Korpi & Blackcell	3:24
2.	"Creep"	Korpi, Johansson, Poole, Minogue	Korpi & Blackcell	3:28
3.	"I Begin to Wonder"	Dacia Bridges, Olaf Kramolowsky, Jean-Claude Ades, Minogue, Ian Masterson	Jean-Claude Ades	3:40
4.	"Hey! (So What)"	Hannah Robinson, Julian Gingell, Barry Stone	Jewels & Stone	3:32
5.	"For the Record"	Korpi, Johansson, Poole, Minogue	Korpi & Blackcell	3:21
6.	"Mighty Fine"	Gil Cang, Liz Winstanley, Sekou Bunch, Thomas Brown, Thomassina Smith	Gil Cang	3:55
7.	"On the Loop"	Bruno Alexandre, Camille Troillard, Minogue, Matthieu Joly, Terry Ronald	Neïmo	3:28
8.	"Push"	Minogue, Masterson, Ronald, John Guldberg, Tim Stahl	Ian Masterson and Ronald	3:21
9.	"Mystified"	Masterson, Ronald, Minogue	Masterson and Ronald	3:43
10.	"Don't Wanna Lose This Feeling"	Alexandre, Troillard, Minogue, James Khari, Joly, Ronald	Neïmo	3:50
11.	"Vibe On"	Savan Kotecha, J. Bjorklund, Minogue	Jock-E	3:40
12.	"A Piece of Time"	Alexandre, Troillard, Minogue, Joly, Ronald	Neïmo	3:22
13.	"Who Do You Love Now?"	H. Pulmann, G. van Vlaanderen, Victoria Horn	Riva	3:26
14.	"It Won't Work Out"	Masterson, Ronald, Minogue	Masterson, Ronald, Pete "Boxsta" Martin	4:06
15.	"Come and Get It" (Sebastian Krieg Remix Edit – hidden track)	Ades, Minogue, Robinson	Jean-Claude Ades	6:30
Total length:				56:42

Japanese bonus tracks
No.	Title	Length
15.	"Begin to Spin Me Round" (radio edit)	3:16
16.	"Don't Wanna Lose This Groove" (radio edit)	3:17

Enhanced CD footage
No.	Title	Length
1.	"Who Do You Love Now?" (music video)
2.	"Put the Needle on It" (music video)
3.	"I Begin To Wonder" (music video)
4.	"Hey! (So What)" (photo gallery)

=== 2007 deluxe edition ===
Deluxe edition CD1
No.	Title	Writer(s)	Producer(s)	Length
1.	"Put the Needle on It"	Henrik Korpi; Mathias Johansson; Karen Poole; Dannii Minogue	Korpi & Blackcell	3:24
2.	"Creep"	Korpi; Johansson; Poole; Minogue	Korpi & Blackcell	3:28
3.	"I Begin to Wonder"	Dacia Bridges; Olaf Kramolowsky; Jean-Claude Ades; Minogue; Ian Masterson	Ades	3:40
4.	"Hey! (So What)"	Hannah Robinson; Julian Gingell; Barry Stone	Jewels & Stone	3:32
5.	"For the Record"	Korpi; Johansson; Poole; Minogue	Korpi & Blackcell	3:21
6.	"Mighty Fine"	Gil Cang; Liz Winstanley; Sekou Bunch; Thomas Brown; Thomassina Smith	Gil Cang	3:55
7.	"On the Loop"	Bruno Alexandre; Camille Troillard; Minogue; Matthieu Joly; Terry Ronald	Neïmo	3:28
8.	"Push"	Minogue; Masterson; Ronald; John Guldberg; Tim Stahl	Thriller Jill	3:21
9.	"Mystified"	Masterson; Ronald; Minogue	Thriller Jill	3:43
10.	"Don't Wanna Lose This Feeling" (radio version)	Alexandre; Troillard; Minogue; James Khari; Joly; Ronald	Neïmo	3:33
11.	"Vibe On"	Savan Kotecha; Jock-E; Minogue	Jock-E	3:40
12.	"A Piece of Time"	Alexandre; Troillard; Minogue; Joly; Ronald	Neïmo	3:21
13.	"Who Do You Love Now?"	Riva; Victoria Horn	Riva	3:26
14.	"Come and Get It" (radio version)	Ades; Minogue; Robinson	Ades	3:26
15.	"Nervous"	Masterson; Ronald; Minogue	Thriller Jill	4:21
16.	"Just Can't Give You Up"	Masterson; Ronald; Minogue	Thriller Jill	3:42
17.	"Hide and Seek"	Masterson; Ronald; Minogue	Thriller Jill	3:03
18.	"Don't Wanna Lose This Groove"	Alexandre; Troillard; Minogue; Khari; Joly; Ronald; Madonna; Stephen Bray	Neïmo	3:17
19.	"(Est-ce que) tu m'aimes encore?"	Riva; Horn; Isabelle Nesmon (transl.)	Riva	3:26
20.	"Goodbye Song"	Masterson; Ronald	Thriller Jill	3:51
21.	"It Won't Work Out" (acoustic version)	Masterson; Ronald; Minogue	Fraser T Smith	4:27

Deluxe edition CD2
No.	Title	Length
1.	"Don't Wanna Lose This Groove" (extended version)	5:05
2.	"Begin to Spin Me Round" (extended version)	5:11
3.	"Who Do You Love Now?" (Riva's Bora Bora Club Mix)	8:10
4.	"Put the Needle on It" (Jason Nevins Freak Club Creation Mix)	8:15
5.	"Hide and Seek" (Thriller Jill original extended Mix)	6:36
6.	"Come and Get It" (Jerome Isma-Ae Remix)	6:38
7.	"Put the Needle on It" (Tiga's Cookies Dub)	4:51
8.	"Creep" (Jon Dixon club mix)	6:38
9.	"I Begin to Wonder" (Almighty Transensual Club Mix)	7:57
10.	"Put the Needle on It" (Cicada Vocal Mix)	7:52
11.	"Come and Get It" (Sharam Jey Remix)	6:12
12.	"Don't Wanna Lose This Feeling" (Jupiter Ace Speared Thru the Heart Mix)	4:15

=== Neon Nights 20 ===
Digital download/streaming – Disc 1
No.	Title	Writer(s)	Producer(s)	Length
1.	"Put the Needle on It"	Henrik Korpi; Mathias Johansson; Karen Poole; Dannii Minogue	Korpi & Blackcell	3:24
2.	"Creep"	Korpi; Johansson; Poole; Minogue	Korpi & Blackcell	3:28
3.	"I Begin to Wonder"	Dacia Bridges; Olaf Kramolowsky; Jean-Claude Ades; Minogue; Ian Masterson	Ades	3:40
4.	"Hey! (So What)"	Hannah Robinson; Julian Gingell; Barry Stone	Jewels & Stone	3:32
5.	"For the Record"	Korpi; Johansson; Poole; Minogue	Korpi & Blackcell	3:21
6.	"Mighty Fine"	Gil Cang; Liz Winstanley; Sekou Bunch; Thomas Brown; Thomassina Smith	Gil Cang	3:55
7.	"On the Loop"	Bruno Alexandre; Camille Troillard; Minogue; Matthieu Joly; Terry Ronald	Neïmo	3:28
8.	"Push"	Minogue; Masterson; Ronald; John Guldberg; Tim Stahl	Thriller Jill	3:21
9.	"Mystified"	Masterson; Ronald; Minogue	Thriller Jill	3:43
10.	"Don't Wanna Lose This Feeling" (radio version)	Alexandre; Troillard; Minogue; James Khari; Joly; Ronald	Neïmo	3:33
11.	"Vibe On"	Savan Kotecha; Jock-E; Minogue	Jock-E	3:40
12.	"A Piece of Time"	Alexandre; Troillard; Minogue; Joly; Ronald	Neïmo	3:21
13.	"Who Do You Love Now?"	Guss van Vlaanderen; Horst Pulmann; Victoria Horn	Riva	3:26
14.	"It Won't Work Out"	Minogue; Masterson; Ronald	Pete "Boxsta" Martin; Masterson; Ronald	4:07

Deluxe edition CD/cassette
No.	Title	Writer(s)	Producer(s)	Length
15.	"Don't Wanna Lose This Feeling" (Initial Talk remix)	Alexandre; Troillard; Minogue; Khari; Joly; Ronald	Neïmo; Initial Talk (remix)	5:54
16.	"Blame It on the Music" (AMYL remix)	Minogue; Ronald; Roger Sanchez	Sanchez; AMYL (remix)	6:24
17.	"For the Record" (Luke Mornay Thirst Trap Remix)	Korpi; Johansson; Poole; Minogue	Korpi & Blackcell; Luke Mornay (remix)	6:21
18.	"I Begin to Wonder" (Project K's All Night at 54 Mix)	Bridges; Kramolowsky; Ades; Minogue; Masterson	Ades; Project K (remix)	8:38

CD+DVD – CD / 7-CD box set – CD1
No.	Title	Writer(s)	Producer(s)	Length
15.	"Come and Get It" (radio version)	Minogue; Robinson; Ades	Ades	3:26
16.	"Blame It on the Music"	Minogue; Ronald; Roger Sanchez	Sanchez	3:52
17.	"Hide and Seek"	Masterson; Ronald; Minogue	Masterson; Ronald	3:02
18.	"Nervous"	Masterson; Ronald; Minogue	Masterson; Ronald	4:20
19.	"Goodbye Song"	Masterson; Ronald	Masterson; Ronald	3:51
20.	"Just Can't Give You Up"	Masterson; Ronald; Minogue	Masterson; Ronald	3:41
21.	"Viva L'amour"	Chippe Carlsson; David Kreuger; Jörgen Elofsson; Nicklas Olausson	Masterson; Ronald	3:07

Digital download/streaming – Disc 2
No.	Title	Writer(s)	Producer(s)	Length
1.	"Don't Wanna Lose This Feeling" (Initial Talk radio edit)	Alexandre; Troillard; Minogue; Khari; Joly; Ronald	Neïmo; Initial Talk (remix)	4:12
2.	"Blame It on the Music" (AMYL radio edit)	Minogue; Ronald; Sanchez	Sanchez; AMYL (remix)	3:24
3.	"For the Record" (Luke Mornay Thirst Trap Radio Edit)	Korpi; Johansson; Poole; Minogue	Korpi & Blackcell; Mornay (remix)	3:42
4.	"I Begin to Wonder" (Project K's Night at 54 Mix)	Bridges; Kramolowsky; Ades; Minogue; Masterson	Ades; Project K (remix)	3:41
5.	"(Est-ce que) tu m'aimes encore?"	van Vlaanderen; Pulmann; Horn; Isabelle Nesmon (transl.)	Riva	3:24
6.	"Hide and Seek"	Masterson; Ronald; Minogue	Masterson; Ronald	3:02
7.	"Nervous"	Masterson; Ronald; Minogue	Masterson; Ronald	4:20
8.	"Goodbye Song"	Masterson; Ronald	Masterson; Ronald	3:51
9.	"Just Can't Give You Up"	Masterson; Ronald; Minogue	Masterson; Ronald	3:41
10.	"Viva L'amour"	Carlsson; Kreuger; Elofsson; Olausson	Masterson; Ronald	3:06
11.	"Blame It on the Music"	Minogue; Ronald; Sanchez	Sanchez	3:51
12.	"Begin to Spin Me Round" (radio edit)	Bridges; Ades; Kramolowsky; Minogue; Masterson; Mike Percy; Pete Burns; Steve Coy; Tim Lever	Ades; Stock Aitken Waterman; Masterson (remix)	3:14
13.	"Don't Wanna Lose This Groove" (radio version)	Alexandre; Troillard; Minogue; Khari; Joly; Ronald; Madonna; Stephen Bray	Neïmo; Madonna; Bray	3:14
14.	"Come and Get It" (radio version)	Minogue; Robinson; Ades	Ades	3:24
15.	"Don't Wanna Lose This Feeling" (radio version)	Alexandre; Troillard; Minogue; Khari; Joly; Ronald	Neïmo; Al Stone (remix)	3:32
16.	"Put the Needle on It"	Korpi; Johansson; Poole; Minogue	Korpi & Blackcell; Tiga (remix)	5:16
17.	"Come and Get It" (Sebastian Krieg remix)	Minogue; Robinson; Ades	Ades; Sebastian Krieg (remix)	6:56
18.	"Blame It on the Music" (Roger Sanchez 12″ mix)	Minogue; Ronald; Sanchez	Sanchez	6:10
21.	"It Won't Work Out" (acoustic version)	Masterson; Ronald; Minogue	Fraser T Smith	4:28

=== Notes ===
- "Mighty Fine" contains a sample from "Thighs High (Grip Your Hips and Move)" performed by Tom Browne.
- "Push" contains a sample from "White Horse" performed by Laid Back.
- "Begin to Spin Me Around" is a mashup of "I Begin to Wonder" and Dead or Alive's 1984 song "You Spin Me Round (Like a Record)".
- "Don't Wanna Lose This Groove" is a mashup of "Don't Wanna Lose This Feeling" and Madonna's 1985 song "Into the Groove".

== Credits and personnel ==
- Lead and backing vocals – Dannii Minogue
- Backing vocals – Bruno Alexandre, Debbie French, James Khari, Ian Masterson, Anna Nordell, Karen Poole, Terry Ronald, Mitch Stevens
- Guitar – Mattias Johansson, James Nisbett, Camille Troillard
- Bass – Camille Troillard
- Keyboards – Matthieu Joly, Camille Troillard
- Drums – Matthieu Joly
- Mixing – Etienne Colin, Niklas Flyckt, Pete 'Boxsta' Martin, Heff Moraes, Tim Speight
- Programming – Ian Masterson
- Engineering – Gil Cang, Ian Masterson
- Photography – Matthew Donaldson

== Charts ==
Chart performance for Neon Nights
Chart (2003)	Peak position
Australian Albums (ARIA)	25
Dutch Albums (Album Top 100)	65
French Albums (SNEP)	49
German Albums (Offizielle Top 100)	68
Japanese Albums (Oricon)	134
Scottish Albums (Official Charts)	8
UK Albums (Official Charts)	8
US Top Dance Albums (Billboard)	17
European Albums (Music & Media)	39

2007 chart performance for Neon Nights
Chart (2007)	Peak position
UK Dance Albums (Official Charts)	25

2018 chart performance for Neon Nights
Chart (2018)	Peak position
Scottish Albums (Official Charts)	33
UK Albums (Official Charts)	89
UK Independent Albums (Official Charts)	9

2023 chart performance for Neon Nights (20th Anniversary Edition)
Chart (2023)	Peak position
Australian Albums (ARIA)	17
Scottish Albums (Official Charts)	16
UK Albums (Official Charts)	55
UK Dance Albums (Official Charts)	1
UK Independent Albums (Official Charts)	7

== Certifications ==
Certifications for Neon Nights
Country	Certification	Sales
United Kingdom (BPI)	Gold	100,000

== Release details ==
All editions released by London/Warner Music Group/Ultra Records.

Release history and formats for Neon Nights
Release format	Country	Cat. no.	Release date
United Kingdom	Standard	2564600032	17 March 2003
Europe	Standard	25646 01105	17 March 2003
Australia	Standard	2564600032	April 2003
Colombia	Standard	2564600032	2003
Hong Kong and Taiwan	Standard	2564600032	2003
Canada	Standard	2.60003	21 June 2003
Japan	Japanese edition	WPCR-11579	9 July 2003
United States	US edition	UL 1173-2	7 October 2003
United Kingdom	Deluxe edition	5144 25021 2	5 November 2007
Various	Expanded re-issue	LMS5521215	29 June 2018
Various	20th anniversary deluxe edition	LMS5521940	16 June 2023
