= Don't Gimme That =

Don't Gimme That may refer to:

- "Don't Gimme That" (Aloha from Hell song), 2009
- "Don't Gimme That" (The BossHoss song), 2012
