= Take Me to Your Heart =

Take Me to Your Heart can refer to:

- "Take Me to Your Heart" (Bananarama song)
- "Take Me to Your Heart" (Rick Astley song)
- Take Me to Your Heart (album), an album by Michael Learns to Rock
  - "Take Me to Your Heart" (Michael Learns to Rock song), a song by Michael Learns to Rock
