= I Begin to Wonder =

2003 single by Dannii Minogue

Single by Dannii Minogue

from the album Neon Nights
- B-side: "Hide and Seek"; "Nervous"
- Released: 3 March 2003
- Genre: Dance-pop; electro
- Length: 3:40 (album version); 3:29 (radio edit)
- Label: London
- Songwriters: Jean-Claude Ades; Dacia Bridges; Dannii Minogue; Olaf Kramolowsky
- Producer: J.C.A.

Dannii Minogue singles chronology
"Put the Needle on It" (2002)	"I Begin to Wonder" (2003)	"Don't Wanna Lose This Feeling" (2003)

Music video
- "I Begin to Wonder" on YouTube

"I Begin to Wonder" is a song co-written by Dannii Minogue, Jean-Claude Ades, Dacia Bridges and Olaf Kramolowsky for Minogue's 2003 album Neon Nights. The song was released as the album's second single in March 2003. The single reached the top twenty in multiple countries, and topped the club charts in the United Kingdom. In 2003, it was certified gold in Australia. "I Begin to Wonder" received positive reviews from music critics, and is considered by Minogue to be her "signature tune". Its futuristic music video, directed by Phil Griffin, features Minogue dancing in a room with the song's title swirling around her in numerous languages.

== Background and reception ==
"I Begin to Wonder" was originally performed by German dance music producer Jean-Claude Ades. Minogue's record label, London Records, played the song for her and she thought that it "could definitely be a pop hit". She approached Ades and asked him if he would be willing to transform "I Begin to Wonder" from a club song to a pop song. Together they added additional lyrics and rearranged its instrumentation. Minogue considers the track to be her "signature tune" and is one of her favourite songs to perform live.

In a review for Musicomh.com, Alexis Kirke described it a "simple but energetic" song with a "striding electro-bass line and some heavy vocal effects". Cristín Leach of RTÉ Entertainment called "I Begin to Wonder" one of the best songs on Neon Nights. MSN Entertainment called the track a "decent slice of sparkly radio pop with big synths and 'sexy' vocals".

=== "Begin to Spin Me Round" ===
Simultaneously with the release of the original single, an alternative version of "I Begin to Wonder" was released, entitled "Begin to Spin Me Round", a mashup with the 1984 hit "You Spin Me Round (Like a Record)" by Dead or Alive, and especially with the "Murder Mix" of the latter. This version helped expand the single's success to other European countries, such as Germany.

== Music video ==
Minogue in the video with the song's title swirling around her in several different languages.

The music video was directed by Phil Griffin and filmed in late 2002. The video opens with a scene of Minogue walking down a futuristic hallway covered in photographs used to promote Neon Nights. She is then shown sitting and dancing in a blue room with the song's title swirling around her in numerous languages. The video concludes with scenes of Minogue crouching in a ventilation shaft and cutting her hair.

The music video was released commercially on various enhanced CD single formats. It was also included on The Hits & Beyond special edition companion DVD (2006) and Dannii Minogue: The Video Collection (2007).

== Chart performance ==
"I Begin to Wonder" was released in the United Kingdom on 3 March 2003 as two CD singles and a cassette single. The song debuted on the UK Singles Chart on 15 March 2003 at number two. The following week, "I Begin to Wonder" fell to number seven and exited the chart in its eleventh week of release. The track became Minogue's sixth Upfront Club Chart number one in the UK. It has sold over 113,000 copies in the UK as of March 2016. In Ireland, the track reached number 22 on the singles chart and number seven on the Irish Dance Chart The song was also successful in Europe. It reached the top ten in France and the top fifty in Belgium, the Netherlands, Sweden and Switzerland.

In Australia, "I Begin to Wonder" debuted at number fourteen on 6 April 2003. It was certified gold by the Australian Recording Industry Association in 2003. On the ARIA end of year chart for 2003, the track charted at number eight on the Dance Singles chart and at number sixteen on the Top Australian Singles chart. In the United States, the song reached number fourteen on the Billboard Hot Dance Singles Sales chart, and peaked at number two on Billboard’s Dance/Mix Show Airplay Chart.

== Formats and track listings ==
UK CD single 1

1. "I Begin to Wonder" (radio version) – 3:29
2. "I Begin to Wonder" (Krystal K vocal mix CD edit) – 5:12
3. "Hide and Seek" (Minogue, Terry Ronald, Ian Masterson) – 3:12
4. "I Begin to Wonder" music video

UK CD single 2

1. "I Begin to Wonder" (radio edit) – 3:29
2. Album megamix – 6:22
3. "Nervous" (Minogue, Ronald, Masterson) – 4:21

Cassette single

1. "I Begin to Wonder" (radio edit) – 3:29
2. "Who Do You Love Now?" with Riva (Riva's Bora Bora remix) – 8:12

German and Italian CD single

1. "Begin to Spin Me Round" (Dannii vs. Dead or Alive) – 3:15
2. "I Begin to Wonder" (radio version) – 3:29
3. "I Begin to Wonder" (extended original) – 6:49
4. "I Begin to Wonder" (Krystal K vocal mix CD edit) – 5:12
5. "Begin to Spin Me Around" (extended version) – 5:15

French CD single

1. "I Begin to Wonder" (radio edit) – 3:29
2. "Est-Ce Que Tu M'Aimes Encore" with Riva – 3:29

Australian CD single

1. "I Begin to Wonder" (radio edit) – 3:29
2. "I Begin to Wonder" (Krystal K vocal mix CD edit) – 5:12
3. "Hide and Seek" – 3:12
4. Album megamix – 6:22
5. "Nervous" – 4:21
6. "Dannii Minogue vs. Dead or Alive (Begin to Spin Me Round)" (radio edit) – 3:16
7. "Dannii Minogue vs. Dead or Alive (Begin to Spin Me Round)" (extended mix) – 5:15

US CD single

1. "I Begin to Wonder" (radio edit) – 3:29
2. "I Begin to Wonder" (extended original mix) – 6:51
3. "Begin to Spin Me Round" (extended mix) – 5:13
4. "I Begin to Wonder" music video

US 12-inch single

1. "I Begin to Wonder" (extended original mix) – 6:51
2. "Begin to Spin Me Round" (radio edit) – 3:29
3. "I Begin to Wonder" (DJ Bardot remix) – 7:48
4. "I Begin to Wonder" (Krystal K vocal mix) – 8:04

== Personnel ==
The following people contributed to "I Begin to Wonder":

- Dannii Minogue – lead vocals
- Jean-Claude Ades – production, mixing
- Ian Masterson – additional vocal production
- Matthew Donaldson – photography

== Charts ==
=== Weekly charts ===
Chart (2003)	Peak position
Australia (ARIA)	14
Belgium (Flanders)	50
Belgian (Wallonia) Singles Chart	20
European Hot 100 Singles	7
France (SNEP)	7
Germany (Media Control GfK) "Begin to Spin Me Round"	37
Hungary (Rádiós Top 40)	33
Hungary (Single Top 40)	8
Ireland (IRMA)	22
Netherlands (Dutch Top 40)	45
Quebec (ADISQ)	38
Romania (Romanian Top 100)	20
Scottish Singles Sales (Official Charts)	2
Sweden (Hitlistan)	20
Switzerland (Schweizer Hitparade)	31
UK Singles (Official Charts)	2
US Dance Singles Sales (Billboard)	14
US Dance Airplay (Billboard)	2

=== Year-end charts ===
Chart (2003)	Position
Australia (ARIA)	97
France (SNEP)	83
UK Singles (OCC)	66

Chart (2004)	Position
US Dance Radio Airplay (Billboard)	45

== Release history ==
Region	Date	Format(s)	Label(s)	Ref(s).
United Kingdom	3 March 2003	CD; cassette	London	
Australia	24 March 2003	CD	London	
United States	6 October 2003	Rhythmic contemporary radio	Ultra	
