= Can You Hear Me Boys =

"Can You Hear me Boys"

Single by Aloha from Hell

from the album No More Days to Waste
- A-side: "No More Days To Waste"
- Released: April 03, 2009
- Recorded: 2008
- Genre: Pop punk
- Length: 3:04
- Label: Sony
- Songwriter(s): Michelle Leonard, Linda Karlstedt, Susanna Janjic, Klas Olofsson, Fredrik Landh
- Producer(s): Henrik Korpi, Mats Valentin

Aloha from Hell singles chronology
"No More Days to Waste" (2008)	"Can You Hear me Boys" (2009)

"Can You Hear Me Boys" is the fifth and final single released by Aloha from Hell.

== Track listings ==
CD single

1. "Can You Hear Me Boys" (Single Version) - 3:00
2. "Can You Hear Me Boys" (Alternative Rock Club Remix) - 2:57

CD maxi-single

1. "Can You Hear Me Boys" (Single Version)- 3:00
2. "Can You Hear Me Boys" (Alternative Rock Club Remix) - 2:57
3. "Can You Hear Me Boys" (Live Session Remastered) - 2:57
4. "Girls Just Wanna Have Fun" (Live Session Remastered) - 3:28

== Chart positions ==
Chart (2009)	Peak position
German Singles Chart	59
