= Claire Trentain =

Australian pop singer and songwriter

- Born: Cairns, Queensland
- Years active: 2004-

Claire Trentain is an Australian pop singer and songwriter from Queensland, Australia. Her debut album, Loving the Blue and Green, was produced by Murlyn Music Group and had two charting singles, "Warmth" and "What Would You Say?".

== Discography ==
=== Albums ===
- Loving the Blue & Green (2007)

=== Singles ===
List of singles, with selected chart positions
Title	Year	Peak chart positions	Album
Title	Year	AUS	Album
"Warmth"	2007	49	Loving the Blue & Green
"What Would You Say?"	2007	75	Loving the Blue & Green
