= Drama (Bananarama album) =

Studio album by Bananarama
- Released: 14 November 2005
- Recorded: July 2004 – May 2005
- Genre: Dance-pop; disco; Eurodance; hi-NRG
- Length: 50:42
- Label: A&G
- Producer: Mute 8; Korpi & Blackcell; Leigh Guest; Ian Masterson and Terry Ronald

Bananarama chronology
Really Saying Something: The Platinum Collection (2005)	Drama (2005)	The Twelve Inches of Bananarama (2006)

Singles from Drama
- 1. "Move in My Direction" Released: 25 July 2005; 2. "Look on the Floor (Hypnotic Tango)" Released: 7 November 2005

Professional ratings
Review scores
Source	Rating
AllMusic	link

Drama is the ninth studio album by the English musical duo Bananarama, released on 14 November 2005 by A&G Records. It features eleven newly recorded tracks, along with a remix of their 1986 single "Venus" (done by Soft Cell's Marc Almond) and a 2005 remix of their 1982 single "Really Saying Something", an underground bootleg club hit produced by Solasso.

Drama is a comeback of sorts for Bananarama members Keren Woodward and Sara Dallin and is their first album to be released in their native UK since 1993. The album's first single "Move in My Direction" debuted on the UK Singles Chart at number 14, also becoming their first UK top-40 entry since 1993. The second single, "Look on the Floor (Hypnotic Tango)", also reached the UK top 40, and climbed to number two on the US Hot Dance Club Play chart as an import, becoming Bananarama's biggest US dancefloor hit since "Venus" two decades earlier.

The album mostly incorporates dance-pop and Eurodance musical styles, with some synth-pop elements. Drama charted at a number 169 on the UK Albums Chart. It was later released in the United States (both in retail stores and as digital downloads) in 2006, peaking at number 21 on Billboard's Top Electronic Albums chart.

== Track listing ==
Original Edition

1. "Move in My Direction" – 3:20 (S. Dallin, K. Woodward, D. Clewett, I. Lisinski)
2. "Look on the Floor (Hypnotic Tango)" – 3:26 (S. Dallin, K. Woodward, H. Korpi, M. Wollo, M. Malavasi, S. Micheli)
3. "Waterfall" – 4:18 (S. Dallin, K. Woodward, H. Korpi, M. Wollo)
4. "Frequency" – 3:30 (S. Dallin, K. Woodward, L. Guest, B. Walker)
5. "Feel for You" – 3:28 (S. Dallin, K. Woodward, I. Masterson, T. Ronald)
6. "Don't Step on My Groove" – 3:06 (S. Dallin, K. Woodward, H. Korpi, M. Wollo)
7. "Middle of Nowhere" – 3:46 (S. Dallin, K. Woodward, B. Higgins)
8. "I Love the Way" – 4:18 (S. Dallin, K. Woodward, D. Masters)
9. "Lovebite" – 3:32 (S. Dallin, K. Woodward, H. Korpi, M. Wollo)
10. "Rules of Attraction" – 3:16 (S. Dallin, K. Woodward, H. Korpi, M. Wollo)
11. "Your Love Is Like a Drug" – 4:40 (S. Dallin, I. Masterson, T. Ronald)
12. "Venus" (Marc Almond's Hi-NRG Showgirls Mix) – 6:04 (R. V. Leeuwen)
13. "Really Saying Something" (Solasso Mix) – 5:58 (N. Whitfield, W. Stevenson, E. Holland, Jr)

Taiwanese Edition CD:

1. "Move in My Direction" – 3:20
2. "Look on the Floor (Hypnotic Tango)" – 3:26
3. "Waterfall" – 4:18
4. "Frequency" – 3:30
5. "Feel for You" – 3:28
6. "Don't Step on My Groove" – 3:06
7. "Middle of Nowhere" – 3:46
8. "I Love the Way" – 4:18
9. "Lovebite" – 3:32
10. "Rules of Attraction" – 3:16
11. "Your Love Is Like a Drug" – 4:40
12. "Venus" (Marc Almond's Hi-NRG Showgirls Mix) – 6:04
13. "Really Saying Something" (Solasso Mix) – 5:58
14. "Move in My Direction" (The Lovefreekz Radio Edit) – 3:28
15. "Look on the Floor (Hypnotic Tango)" (Angel City Short Remix) – 2:57

DVD (NTSC/Region-3):

1. "Move in My Direction" – 3:20
2. "Look on the Floor (Hypnotic Tango)" – 3:26

Singaporean Edition

1. "Move in My Direction" – 3:20
2. "Look on the Floor (Hypnotic Tango)" (Angel City Short Remix) – 2:57
3. "Waterfall" — 4:18)
4. "Frequency" – 3:30
5. "Feel for You" – 3:28
6. "Don't Step on My Groove" – 3:06
7. "Middle of Nowhere" – 3:46
8. "I Love the Way" – 4:18
9. "Lovebite" – 3:32
10. "Rules of Attraction" – 3:16
11. "Your Love Is Like a Drug" – 4:40
12. "Venus" (Marc Almond's Hi NRG Showgirls mix) – 6:04
13. "Really Saying Something" (Solasso Mix) – 5:58
14. "Look on the Floor (Hypnotic Tango)" – 3:26
15. "Move in My Direction" (Bobby Blanco and Miki Moto Vocal Mix) – 8:06
16. "Move in My Direction" (Angel City Mix) – 6:52

Unreleased songs and demos

1. "Be My Lover Tonite"
2. "One Way Street" (written by Neil Tennant and Chris Lowe of Pet Shop Boys as confirmed in their official publication Literally)
3. "Falling"
4. "Better with You"

== Personnel ==
Bananarama

- Sara Dallin – Vocals
- Keren Woodward – Vocals
- Siobhan Fahey – Vocals on "Really Saying Something" (Solasso Mix)

Additional personnel

- Matt Curtis – Sleeve Design
- Mark Bond – Photography

Producers

- Mute 8
- Korpi and BlackCell
- Leigh Guest
- Ian Masterson and Terry Ronald

Additional production

- Jeremy Wheatley and Brio Taliaferro for 365 Artists

Engineers

- Ian Masterson on "Feel for You"
- Kinky Roland and Ben Wood on "Venus" (Marc Almond's Hi NRG Showgirls Mix)

Guitars

- L. Dukes and R. Mayes on "Frequency"
- Joe Holweger on "I Love the Way"

Bass

- Joe Holweger on "I Love the Way"

Additional vocals

- Mitch Stevens on "Middle of Nowhere" and "I Love the Way"

Mixers

- Ian Masterson and Terry Ronald for Thriller Jill
- Jeremy Wheatley for 365 Artists at Twenty-one Studios, London
- Niklas Flyckt at Khabang Studios
- Marten Eriksson at Cosmo Studio, Stockholm
- Solasso on "Really Saying Something"

Mastered by

- Naweed Ahmed at Whitfield Street Studios
- Dick Beetham at 360 Mastering, London

Published by Copyright Control/Murlyn Songs AB-Universal Music Publishing/Rondor Music/Warner Chappell

Programming and keyboards

- Leigh Guest on "Frequency"
- Ian Masterson on "Feel for You", "Middle of Nowhere" and "I Love the Way"

Recorded at

- Strongroom and Thriller Jills, London ("Middle of Nowhere", "I Love the Way" and "Your Love Is Like a Drug")

== Charts ==
Chart (2005–2006)	Peak position
Australian Albums (ARIA)	334
UK Albums (OCC)	169
US Top Dance Albums (Billboard)	21
UK Independent Albums (OCC)	37
