= Mathias Johansson =

Mathias Johansson may refer to:

- Mathias Johansson (ice hockey), a former Swedish ice hockey forward
- Mathias Johansson (producer), a Swedish music producer part of the team Korpi & Blackcell
