= Viva (Bananarama album) =

Studio album by Bananarama
- Released: 14 September 2009
- Recorded: July 2008–May 2009
- Genre: Hi-NRG
- Label: Fascination
- Producer: Ian Masterson

Bananarama chronology
Greatest Hits and More More More (2007)	Viva (2009)	30 Years of Bananarama (2012)

Singles from Viva
- 1. "Love Comes" Released: 6 September 2009; 2. "Love Don't Live Here" Released: 12 April 2010

Professional ratings
Review scores
Source	Rating
BBC	(favourable)

Viva is the tenth studio album recorded by the English vocal duo Bananarama. It was released by Fascination Records on 14 September 2009 in the UK.

Viva is Bananarama's fifth album as a duo consisting of Sara Dallin and Keren Woodward, and their first new album since 2005's Drama. It contains the singles "Love Comes", "Love Don't Live Here", and other new tracks co-written by Dallin and Woodward. The album also includes three cover versions: "Rapture" (originally by iiO), "The Runner" (originally a 1979 hit for The Three Degrees), and "S-S-S-Single Bed" (originally by Fox).

The album had been originally conceived as a covers album. However, the group changed their approach midway through the recording of the album and wrote original material for it. In addition to the three covers on the physical CD release, four additional cover versions were made available on download format: "Run to You" (originally by Bryan Adams), "The Sound of Silence" (originally by Simon and Garfunkel), "Voyage Voyage" (originally by Desireless), and "Tokyo Joe" (originally by Bryan Ferry). The latter two were also issued as b-sides to the vinyl releases of their single "Love Comes".

Three of these four bonus tracks were only available until the album's release date.

The album charted on the UK Albums Chart at number 87, the band's fourth consecutive album to miss the top 40. In 2019, a deluxe expanded edition, including b-sides and remixes, was released by Cherry Red Records on double CD.

== Track listing ==
=== Standard Edition ===
1. "Love Comes" 4:15 (S. Dallin, K. Woodward, I. Masterson)
2. "Love Don't Live Here" 4:59 (S. Dallin, K. Woodward, I. Masterson)
3. "Rapture" 4:13 (N. Ali, M. Moser)
4. "Seventeen" 4:24 (S. Dallin, K. Woodward, I. Masterson)
5. "Twisting" 3:43 (S. Dallin, K. Woodward, M. Rose, N. Foster)
6. "Tell Me Tomorrow" 3:54 (S. Dallin, K. Woodward, I. Masterson)
7. "The Runner" 3:25 (G. Moroder, S. Ferguson)
8. "Extraordinary" 3:35 (S. Dallin, K. Woodward, I. Masterson, P. Harris)
9. "Dum Dum Boy" 3:25 (S. Dallin, K. Woodward, I. Masterson)
10. "S-S-S-Single Bed" 4:01 (Kenny Young)
11. "We've Got the Night" 3:51 (S. Dallin, K. Woodward, I. Masterson)

=== Digital Edition ===
12. "The Sound of Silence" 3:42 (P. Simon)

=== iTunes Limited Edition ===
12. "The Sound of Silence" 3:42 (P. Simon)
13. "Run to You" 3:04 (B. Adams/J. Vallance)

=== Deluxe Expanded Edition ===
1. "The Sound of Silence" 3:43
2. "Run to You" 3:05
3. "Love Comes" (Radio Edit) 3:42
4. "Love Comes" (Riff & Rays Radio Mix) 3:22
5. "The Runner" (Buzz Junkies 7" Mix) 3:41
6. "Love Comes" (Wideboys Club Edit) 3:30
7. "Love Comes" (Wideboys A-Mix) 3:28
8. "Love Don't Live Here" (Ian Masterson's Extended Mix) 6:48
9. "Love Comes" (Wideboys Club Mix) 7:32
10. "The Runner" (Buzz Junkies 12" Mix) 8:00
11. "Love Comes" (Riff & Rays Club Mix) 6:29
12. "Here Comes the Rain" 4:17
13. "Voyage, Voyage" 3:58
14. "Tokyo Joe" 3:18
15. "Cruel Summer '09" 3:10
16. "Every Shade of Blue '10" 3:32
17. "Love Comes" (Wideboys Dub) 6:17

== Personnel ==
- Sara Dallin – Vocals, vocal arrangement
- Keren Woodward – Vocals, vocal arrangement

=== Musicians ===
- Ian Masterson – Programming and keyboards
- Joe Holweger – Guitar on track 10

Additional personnel

- Ellis Parrinder – Photography
- Ian Masterson – Mixer and producer for Thriller Jill
- Dave Turner – Masterer at 360 Mastering London
- Dick Beetham – Masterer on track 1 at 360 Mastering London
- Albert Samuel – Management for ASM Damage

== Charts ==
Chart (2009)	Peak position
UK Albums (OCC)	87
UK Independent Albums (OCC)	33
