= Now or Never (Bananarama EP) =

EP by Bananarama
- Released: 21 September 2012
- Recorded: 2012
- Genre: Pop
- Length: 16:57
- Label: Self-released
- Producer: Ian Masterson

Bananarama chronology
30 Years of Bananarama (2012)	Now or Never (2012)	In Stereo (2019)

Bananarama singles chronology
"Baby It's Christmas" (2010)	"Now or Never" (2012)	"Stuff Like That" (2019)

Now or Never is the second extended play by the English musical duo Bananarama. It was released independently on 21 September 2012 to coincide with the 30th anniversary of the group and the launch of their Hard Rock Cafe "Pinktober" US tour.

The EP features "Now or Never" and "La La Love", two new recordings written in collaboration with British producer Ian Masterson. An extended version of the title track and a cover of Maroon 5's song "Moves Like Jagger" were also included in the package.

A remixed version of their 1992 song "Movin' On" was offered as a gift to fans who bought the EP and sent their proofs of purchase to the official website before 20 October 2012.

== Track listing ==
No.	Title	Writer(s)	Length
1.	"Now or Never"	Sara Dallin; Keren Woodward; Ian Masterson	3:53
2.	"La La Love"	Dallin; Woodward; Masterson	3:32
3.	"Moves Like Jagger"	Adam Levine; Benny Blanco; Ammar Malik; Shellback	3:26
4.	"Now or Never" (extended mix)	Dallin; Woodward; Masterson	6:06

== Charts ==
Chart (2012)	Peak position
US Dance Singles Sales (Billboard)	4
US Hot Singles Sales (Billboard)	11

== Release history ==
Region	Date	Format	Label	Catalog
Various	21 September 2012	Digital download	Self-released	NANEP33
