= Love Comes =

Single by Bananarama

from the album Viva
- B-side: "Cruel Summer '09"; "Voyage Voyage"; "Tokyo Joe"
- Released: 6 September 2009
- Genre: Hi-NRG
- Label: Fascination
- Songwriters: Sara Dallin; Keren Woodward; Ian Masterson
- Producer: Ian Masterson

Bananarama singles chronology
"Look on the Floor (Hypnotic Tango)" (2005)	"Love Comes" (2009)	"Love Don't Live Here" (2010)

"Love Comes" is a song recorded by the English girl group Bananarama. It was released on 6 September 2009 as the lead single from their tenth studio album Viva. The single reached number 44 on the UK Singles Chart.

== Background ==
The song was written by Bananarama members Sara Dallin and Keren Woodward and producer Ian Masterson. The B-side for the CD single is a new version of their 1983 hit "Cruel Summer", while the B-side tracks for the vinyl editions are cover versions.

The song is the first single in the group's career where the members performed solo sections rather than harmonising as a group.

== Music video ==
A music video for "Love Comes" was shot in London on 1 July 2009. The video features Dallin and Woodward in various retro outfits, and has both outdoor and studio settings. The theme of the video is a reflection on various fashion magazines and trends, with each scene intended to be a different 'glamour shot'. The song lyrics are projected onto backgrounds, and onto the girls themselves in most of the scenes.

== Formats and track listings ==
- 7-inch picture disc featuring Keren
1. "Love Comes" (radio edit)
2. "Voyage Voyage" (D. A. Dubois/J. M. Rivat)
- 7-inch picture disc featuring Sara
1. "Love Comes" (radio edit)
2. "Tokyo Joe" (B. Ferry)
- CD single
1. "Love Comes" (radio edit)
2. "Cruel Summer '09"
- Digital download
1. "Love Comes" (album version)
2. "Love Comes" (Ian Masterson's 12-inch extended mix)
- iTunes Exclusive remix bundle
1. "Love Comes" (radio edit)
2. "Love Comes" (Riff & Rays club mix)
3. "Love Comes" (Wideboys club mix)
- Digital download – remix bundle
1. "Love Comes" (radio edit)
2. "Love Comes" (Riff & Rays radio edit)
3. "Love Comes" (Wideboys radio edit)
- Digital download – alternate version
1. "Love Comes" (alternate version) or (Wideboys A mix)
- Promo remixes
1. "Love Comes" (Wideboys club mix)
2. "Love Comes" (Riff & Rays club mix)
3. "Love Comes" (Ian Masterson's extended mix)
4. "Love Comes" (Wideboys dub)
5. "Love Comes" (Riff & Rays radio edit)
6. "Love Comes" (Wideboys club edit)
7. "Love Comes" (Wideboys A mix)
8. "Love Comes" (radio edit)
9. "Love Comes" (album version)

Notes:

- "Voyage Voyage" was originally performed by Desireless.
- "Tokyo Joe" was originally performed by Bryan Ferry.

== Charts ==
Chart performance for "Love Comes"
Chart (2009)	Peak position
UK Singles (Official Charts)	44
