= Tiger Lou =

Swedish band

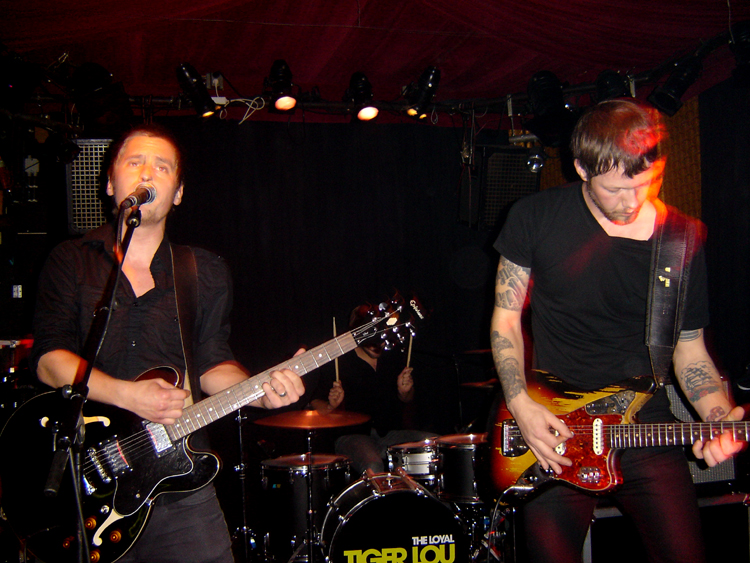
- Rasmus Kellerman (L.) and Mathias Johansson (R.)

Background information
- Origin: Nyköping, Sweden
- Genres: Indie rock, Alternative pop
- Years active: 2001–present
- Labels: Blackstar Foundation (Europe); Startracks (Europe); Riptide Recordings (Europe) Eyeball Records (United States)
- Members: Rasmus Kellerman (Vocals/Guitar); Erik Welén (Bass/Vocals); Mathias Johansson (Guitar); Pontus Levahn (Drums/Vocals)

Swedish band Tiger Lou was formed in Nyköping 2001 by Rasmus Kellerman. After several EPs, the first full-length album Is My Head Still On? was released in 2004 and was followed in 2005 with The Loyal. Rasmus Kellerman is also known as Araki.

On the albums Tiger Lou is a solo project with Kellerman writing lyrics and playing nearly every instrumental part himself. Live, however, he is backed up by Erik Welén (bass), Mathias Johansson(Guitar) and Pontus Levahn (Drums).

According to Kellerman, the name Tiger Lou is taken from a character called Tiger Lu in Corey Yuen's 1993 movie Fong Sai-yuk, although he says that "no one knows where the extra O came from" on the band's official site. Kellerman has said he even considered "Ben Parker," "Karl Kellerman," and "Boy Loves Boy," for band names, however, finally deciding on Tiger Lou after watching the film Fong Sai-yuk.

Rasmus Kellerman was married to Swedish singer-songwriter Andrea Kellerman, better known as Firefox AK. They have had multiple collaborations and two children. Amicably, they divorced in 2018.

In 2004, Tiger Lou was nominated "Newcomer of the Year" at the Swedish Alternative Music Awards manifest. Their music video for "Oh Horatio", directed by Magnus Renfors, was nominated for a Swedish Grammi in the "Best Video" category.

== Discography ==
=== Albums ===
- Is My Head Still On? (March 2004) – Startracks
- The Loyal (October 2005) – Startracks
- A Partial Print (October 2008) – Startracks
- The Wound Dresser (September 2016) – Startracks
- Acts (September 2023) – Startracks
- Acts II (February 2024) - Startracks

=== EPs ===
- Second Time Around (2001)
- Trouble and Desire (2003)
- Last Night ... (2004)
- Gone Drifting (2008)
- California Hauling (2015)

=== Singles ===
- Oh Horatio (2004)
- Sell Out (2004)
- The War Between Us (2004)
- The Loyal (2005)
- Nixon (2006)
- Until I'm There (2006)
- Coalitions (2008)
- Crushed By A Crowd (2008)
- Homecoming #2 (2014)
- Every Battle Alike (2017)
- End Times (2022)

== Reboot ==
On October 15, 2013, Kellerman announced on his website,

I guess – to make a four year long story very short – all I can say is that Tiger Lou is alive and well... Life is too short and if you find something you like doing, best keep doing it till you can’t do it no more... We have begun recording some stuff, and it will probably take forever until anything is finished. Just thought I’d put the word out there.

Tiger Lou then went to on play multiple shows live later that year.

On October 30, 2014, Tiger Lou released a single named, "Homecoming #2" accompanied by a music video directed by Peder Bergstrand from the band, I ARE DROID. Along with the "Homecoming #2" single, a new EP was planned for release towards the end of 2015 They then played live in, Hamburg, Leipzig and Berlin March 2015.

On October 16, 2015, Tiger Lou released their five track EP called, "California Hauling"; Limited to 700 copies on 12" Gatefold vinyl, and 700 copies on CD. They called it a, "wee pit stop" on the way to a full album. April 2016, Startracks began to re-release Tiger Lou, Araki, and Las Puertas albums on multiple mediums. Following the re-releases, Startracks announced the first single from their album, "The Wound Dresser" May 20, 2016 called, "Leap of Love."

On September 23, 2016 Tiger Lou released their fourth studio album titled, "The Wound Dresser". Stating in a Q&A video February 23, 2017 Rasmus Kellerman stated,

The whole theme of the new record is about a person who loses his or her love of their life and leaves their hometown. They stay away for a number of years and then they return and they kind of, you know, they rekindle with all their friends, past lovers, family and so forth. It just quite quickly became pretty apparent that's what we were doing as well in a lot of ways. So it just feels like a natural theme. It was easy to write and connect to that feeling while writing the lyrics for this album.

The band is set to release the single, "Every Battle Alike" April 22, 2017.
