= Walk Away (Aloha from Hell song) =

Single by Aloha from Hell

from the album No More Days to Waste
- A-side: "Walk Away"
- B-side: "Wake Me Up"
- Released: November 14, 2008
- Recorded: 2008
- Genre: Pop rock
- Length: 3:45 (album version)
- Label: Sony
- Songwriters: Tord Bäckström, Bengt Girell, Jan Nilsson
- Producers: Alex Wende, René Rennefeld

Aloha from Hell singles chronology
"Don't Gimme That" (2008)	"Walk Away" (2008)	"No More Days to Waste" (2009)

"Walk Away" is a song written by Tord Bäckström, Bengt Girell and Jan Nilsson for German pop-rock group Aloha from Hell's 2009 debut album No More Days to Waste. It was released as the album's second single on November 14, 2008. The song reached number twenty-six in the German singles chart.

== Track listings ==
CD single

1. "Walk Away" (single version) - 3:47
2. "Walk Away" (orchestral version) - 4:15

CD maxi-single

1. "Walk Away" (single version) - 3:47
2. "Walk Away" (orchestral version) - 4:15
3. "Wake Me Up" - 3:23
4. "Walk Away" (instrumental) - 3:44
  - "Walk Away" (music video) - 3:48

== Charts ==
Chart (2008)	Peak position
Austrian Singles Chart	70
German Singles Chart	26
