= Move in My Direction =

2005 single by Bananarama

Single by Bananarama

from the album Drama
- Released: 25 July 2005
- Genre: Dance-pop
- Length: 3:20
- Label: A&G
- Songwriters: Sara Dallin; Keren Woodward; David Clewett; Ivar Lisinski
- Producer: Mute 8

Bananarama singles chronology
"Take Me to Your Heart" (1995)	"Move in My Direction" (2005)	"Look on the Floor (Hypnotic Tango)" (2005)

"Move in My Direction" is a song written by the English musical duo Bananarama, David Clewett, and Ivar Lisinski for Bananarama's ninth studio album, Drama (2005). The song was produced by Mute 8 and received a mixed reception from music critics. It was released as the first single on 25 July 2005 and reached number 14 in the United Kingdom, becoming the duo's first top-40 hit in 12 years.

In the United States, "Move in My Direction" was not promoted as a single until after the number two dance club success of follow-up single "Look on the Floor (Hypnotic Tango)". In August 2006, "Move in My Direction" entered the US Hot Dance Club Play chart, more than a year after its initial UK release.

== Music video ==
The music video features Dallin and Woodward dressed up in fancy dresses while wandering listlessly by a busy road and sitting on a couch in an abandoned urban lot. Their shots are intercut with scenes of dancers performing dances ranging from tango to ballroom to breakdancing. The music video was directed by Phil Griffin.

== Formats and track listings ==
These are the formats and track listings of major single releases of "Move in My Direction".

UK CD single 1

1. "Move in My Direction" (Radio edit) – (3:20)
2. "Venus" (Marc Almond's Hi NRG remix) – (6:04)

UK CD single 2

1. "Move in My Direction" (Radio edit) – (3:20)
2. "Move in My Direction" (Bobby Blanco and Miki Moto Moto Vocal mix) – (8:07)
3. "Move in My Direction" (The Lovefreekz Vocal mix) – (7:22)
  Remixed by Mark Hadfield
4. "Move in My Direction" (Redanka's Fascination remix) – (7:55)
5. "Move in My Direction" music video

Australian CD single

1. "Move in My Direction" (Radio Edit) – (3:20)
2. "Move in My Direction" (Angel CityRadio Edit) – (3:15)
  Remixed by Hugo Zentveld (aka DJ Renegade) & Aldwin Oomen
3. "Move in My Direction" (The LovefreekzRadio Edit) – (3:25)
  Remixed by Mark Hadfield
4. "Move in My Direction" (Bobby Blanco and Miki Moto Radio Edit) – (3:06)
5. "Move in My Direction" (Bobby Blanco and Miki Moto Dub) – (8:36)
6. "Move in My Direction" (Bobby Blanco and Miki Moto Vocal Mix) – (8:07)
7. "Move in My Direction" (Angel CityMix) – (6:50)
  Remixed by Hugo Zentveld (aka DJ Renegade) & Aldwin Oomen
8. "Move in My Direction" (The LovefreekzVocal Mix) – (7:22)
  Remixed by Mark Hadfield
9. "Move in My Direction" (Redanka's Fascination Mix) – (7:55)

7" Vinyl Single

1. "Move in My Direction" (Radio edit) – (3:20)
2. "Move in My Direction" (Angel City remix) – (6:53)
  Remixed by Hugo Zentveld (aka DJ Renegade) & Aldwin Oomen

12" Vinyl Single Nice Music(2007),(Fr.)

Side A

1. "Move in My Direction" (Pat The Cat Ibiza Mix)
2. "Move in My Direction" (The Lovefreekz Vocal Mix) – (7:22)
  Remixed by Mark Hadfield

Side B

1. "Move in My Direction" (Bobby Blanco and Miki Moto Dub) – (8:36)
2. "Move in My Direction" (Pat The Cat Ibiza Dub)

Promo Mixes

1. "Move in My Direction" (Bobby Blanco and Miki Moto Vocal Dub) – (8:36)
2. "Move in My Direction" (The LovefreekzRadio Mix) – (3:25)
  Remixed by Mark Hadfield
3. "Move in My Direction" (Redanka's Fascination Edit)
4. "Move in My Direction" (Bobby Blanco and Miki Moto Vocal Edit) – (3:06)
5. "Move in My Direction" (The LovefreekzDub) – (5:52)
  Remixed by Mark Hadfield
6. "Move in My Direction" (Redanka's Fascination Dub)
7. "Move in My Direction" (Angel City Dub) – (7:38)
  Remixed by Hugo Zentveld (aka DJ Renegade) & Aldwin Oomen

== Charts ==
Chart (2005–2006)	Peak position
Australia (ARIA)	41
Belgium (Ultratop 50 Flanders)	25
Belgium (Ultratip Bubbling Under Wallonia)	10
Germany (GfK)	93
Ireland (IRMA)	34
Netherlands (Single Top 100)	67
Scotland Singles (OCC)	18
UK Singles (OCC)	14
US Dance Club Songs (Billboard)	14
