= Is My Head Still On? =

Studio album by Tiger Lou
- Released: 2004
- Recorded: 2004
- Genre: Indie rock
- Label: Festival Records

Tiger Lou chronology
| Is My Head Still On? (2004) | The Loyal (2005) |

Professional ratings
Review scores
| Source | Rating |
|---|---|
| Firesideometer | 8.5/10 link |

Is My Head Still On? is the first album by Swedish band Tiger Lou. It was released in 2004.

== Track listing ==
1. Sound Of Crickets
2. Sell Out
3. Oh Horatio
4. Warmth
5. War Between Us
6. Like You Said
7. Last Night They Had To Carry Me Home
8. Wake (Hooray Hooray)
9. All In Good Time
10. Lowdown

== Videos ==
Videos were made for the tracks "Oh Horatio" (which became MTV's 'Pick Of The Week') and "Sell Out".
