= No More Days to Waste (song) =

Single by Aloha from Hell

from the album No More Days to Waste
- A-side: "No More Days to Waste"
- Released: April 03, 2009
- Recorded: 2008
- Genre: Pop punk
- Length: 3:01
- Label: Sony
- Songwriter(s): Michelle Leonard, Linda Karlstedt, Susanna Janjic, Klas Olofsson, Fredrik Landh
- Producer(s): Henrik Korpi, Mats Valentin

Aloha from Hell singles chronology
"Walk Away" (2008)	"No More Days to Waste" (2009)	"Can You Hear Me Boys" (2009)

"No More Days to Waste" is a song written by Michelle Leonard, Linda Karlstedt, Susanna Janjic, Klas Olofsson and Fredrik Landh for German pop-rock group Aloha from Hell's 2009 debut album No More Days to Waste. It was released as the album's third single on April 3, 2009. The song reached number fifty-nine in the German singles chart.

== Track listings ==
CD Single

1. "No More Days to Waste (single version)" - 3:00
2. "No More Days to Waste (Time Tools radio version)" - 2:57

CD Maxi Single

1. "No More Days to Waste (single version)" - 3:00
2. "No More Days to Waste (Time Tools radio version)" - 2:57
3. "No More Days to Waste (Unplugged version) " - 2:57
4. "I'll Smash Your Mind (live) " - 3:28

== Chart positions ==
Chart (2009)	Peak position
German Singles Chart	59
