= Hypnotic Tango =

1983 single by My Mine

Single by My Mine

from the album Stone
- B-side: "Hypnotic Tango (Instrumental Version)"
- Released: 1983
- Genre: Italo disco
- Length: 3:44
- Label: Progress
- Songwriters: Ginko; Tayx
- Producer: Lemon

My Mine singles chronology
"Hypnotic Tango" (1983)	"Zorro" (1984)

"Hypnotic Tango" is the debut single by Italian Italo disco band My Mine, released in 1983.

== Commercial performance ==
Across Europe, the song reached the top-ten in Germany and Switzerland, while reaching the top 40 charts of Belgium.

== Reception ==
Italian writer Rocco Bargioni in his book In Pista! defined the song "an Italo disco classic with touches of New wave" and added that My Mine "never achieved the same level of success as with Hypnotic Tango. But sometimes, a single song is all it takes to secure your place in history".

== Track listings ==
- Italian 7-inch single

A. "Hypnotic Tango" – 3:44
B. "Hypnotic Tango" (Instrumental Version) – 4:01

- Italian 12-inch single

A. "Hypnotic Tango" – 6:10
B. "Hypnotic Tango" (Instrumental Version) – 5:20

- German / Austrian / Swiss 7-inch single

A. "Hypnotic Tango" – 3:45
B. "Hypnotic Tango" (Instrumental Version) – 4:02

== Charts ==
=== Weekly charts ===
Weekly chart performance for "Hypnotic Tango"
Chart (1983–1984)	Peak position
Belgium (Ultratop 50 Flanders)	32
Switzerland (Schweizer Hitparade)	10
West Germany (GfK)	5

=== Year-end charts ===
Year-end chart performance for "Hypnotic Tango"
Chart (1984)	Position
West Germany (Official German Charts)	38

== Sampling ==
In 2005, English girl group Bananarama interpolated the song in "Look on the Floor (Hypnotic Tango)" which reached No. 26 on the UK Singles Chart and No. 2 on the U.S. Billboard Dance Club Songs chart.
