= Coburn (band) =

UK electronic band

Coburn is a London, UK-based electronic band. Its members are Pete Martin and Tim Healey.

The duo are producers, remixers, DJs and LIVE festival performers and active on the global dance scene whose debut long-player was released June 2007 on Great Stuff Recordings.

== "We Interrupt This Programme" ==
We Interrupt This Programme (JCA Remix)
A 19-second sample of their 2005 hit "We Interrupt This Programme" 197 KB

After some cult success in the house scene, their next song "We Interrupt This Programme" (Data/Great Stuff/Frontier) re-defined house music in 2005, with its glitchy, "edit-orientated" take on a party tune. The sound crossed boundaries and borders becoming popular with DJs and clubbers from almost every scene in dance, and even being championed by radio presenters normally associated with rock and alternative sounds. Coburn became popular with "We Interrupt This Programme" on the internet - featured on many entertainment websites. "We Interrupt This Programme" was remixed by a cornucopia of djs of all electronic music genres most notably Jean-Claude Ades, whose mix is used as the theme song in the "NEDM" (Not Even Doom Music) fad on YTMND. A short, 5-second snippet of this song was featured in the television series Heroes, season 2, episode "Four Months Ago...".

== Recent developments ==
Coburn's follow up single, "Give Me Love" (a loose cover of Donna Summer's Giorgio Moroder-produced "I Feel Love") pummelled dance-floors around the world in 2006, and its flip, "Razorblade" also featuring the delicate Icelandic vocals of Heidrun (ex-Gloss, Cicada) has been released in June 2007, and has been described as "Kylie on acid".

The duo released some of their work on a compilation released in March 2007 on Frontier Recordings (the label owned by one half of Coburn, Pete Martin).

Coburn have enjoyed some fame stateside when their track entitled "Closer" was featured on Grey's Anatomy in its Season 3 Finale (Episode 3.25).

== Releases ==
- Coburn's Theme (2003)
- "How To Brainwash Your Friends" EP (2003)
- "Give Me Love" (2005, Single)
- "Sugar Lips" (2005)
- "We Have The Technology" (2005, Single)
- "We Interrupt This Programme" (2005, Single)
- "Give Me Love" (2006, Single)
- "Superstar" (2006)
- Coburn (2007, Album)
