= Every Shade of Blue =

Single by Bananarama

from the album Ultra Violet
- Released: 21 August 1995
- Genre: Eurodance; hi-NRG
- Length: 4:01
- Label: Avex Trax
- Songwriters: Sara Dallin; Keren Woodward; Gary Miller
- Producer: Gary Miller

Bananarama singles chronology
| "More, More, More" (1993) | "Every Shade of Blue" (1995) | "Take Me to Your Heart" (1995) |

Music video
- "Every Shade of Blue" on YouTube

"Every Shade of Blue" is a song by the English musical duo Bananarama, from their seventh album, Ultra Violet (1995). After appearing as a B-side in the promotional single "I Found Love", the song was officially released as lead single on 21 August 1995, by Avex Trax, only in Australia, Japan and dance radio station in US. Bananarama did not have a major-label contract at the time. The song is written by Sara Dallin and Keren Woodward of Bananarama with its producer, Gary Miller. The accompanying music video was directed by Roland Mouret.

== Background ==
The sentiments and sound of the song are melancholic and diverge from the upbeat nature of the majority of their hits. "Every Shade of Blue" reached number 124 in Australia and number 41 on Billboard's Hot Dance Singles Sales chart in the United States.

In 2010, Bananarama re-recorded the song. This new version appeared on the B-side of the group's single "Love Don't Live Here".

== Critical reception ==
Larry Flick from Billboard magazine wrote that the song is "standard Euro-NRG fare that benefits from producer Gary Miller's ability to balance solid song arrangements with spine-crawling dance rhythms." He also added the track as a "vibrant single". Dave Sholin from the Gavin Report commented that Bananarama is now a twosome, and on the strength of this "slice of rhythmic pop, they stand a good chance of scoring their first success in this decade."

== Music video ==
The music video was directed by fashion designer Roland Mouret and features footage of the two girls singing the song while sitting on the floor. These shots are interspersed with brief images of three young men who either pose for the camera or play with a soccer ball.

== Track listings ==
- German CD single
1. "Every Shade of Blue" (radio version) – 4:11
2. "Every Shade of Blue" (Mix 1 Vox Hi) – 5:36 (a.k.a. "Euromix" & "A La Mode Mix")
3. "Every Shade of Blue" (Lenny Bertoldo radio mix) – 4:00
4. "Every Shade of Blue" (12" Fab Four mix for Cleveland City) – 6:25
5. "Every Shade of Blue" (Armand van Helden's Ruffneck mix) – 8:02
- US 12-inch single
1. "Every Shade of Blue" (X-tended club mix) – 6:05
2. "Every Shade of Blue" (Armand van Helden's Ruffneck mix) – 8:02
3. "Every Shade of Blue" (12" Fab Four mix for Cleveland City) – 6:25
4. "Every Shade of Blue" (Mix 1 Vox Hi) – 5:36 (a.k.a. "Euromix" & "A La Mode Mix")
5. "Every Shade of Blue" (album version) – 4:01

== Charts ==
| Chart (1996) | Peak position |
|---|---|
| Australia (ARIA) | 124 |
| US Dance Singles Sales (Billboard) | 41 |
