= The Loyal =

Studio album by Tiger Lou
- Released: October 26, 2005
- Recorded: October 2004 – June 2005
- Genre: Indie rock
- Label: Startracks

Tiger Lou chronology
Is My Head Still On? (2004)	The Loyal (2005)	A Partial Print (2008)

Professional ratings
Review scores
Source	Rating
AbsolutePunk.net	91% link

The Loyal is Tiger Lou's second album, featuring dark, melancholic and electric sounds.

== Track listing ==
There were two "The Loyal" albums released. One was on Startracks on Oct 10, 2005. The other was to Eyeball Records on Oct 26, 2005. The difference between the albums is their 11th track. The one to Startracks is "All I Have" - 3:55, and the one to Eyeball Records is "Pilots" - 5:18

1. "Woland's First" – 0:14
2. "The Loyal" – 5:35
3. "Patterns" – 3:03
4. "Functions" – 3:14
5. "Until I'm There" – 4:11
6. "Nixon" – 3:09
7. "National Ave" – 2:47
8. "Ten Minutes To Take Off" – 4:13
9. "Albino Apparel" – 3:05
10. "Like My Very Own Blood" – 4:05
11. "All I Have" – 3:55
12. "Days Will Pass" - 3:43
13. "Woland's Last" - 5:38
