= I Found Love =

Promotional single by Bananarama

from the album Ultra Violet / I Found Love
- Released: July 1995
- Recorded: May 1994
- Genre: Dance
- Label: Avex Trax
- Songwriters: Sara Dallin; Keren Woodward; Tetsuya Komuro
- Producers: Gary Miller; Tetsuya Komuro

Music video
- "I Found Love" on YouTube

"I Found Love" is a song recorded by the English girl group Bananarama. The song was released as a promotional single only in Japan as a double-A-side with "Every Shade of Blue".

== Background ==
The instrumental track was composed by Japanese dance producer Tetsuya Komuro while group members Sara Dallin and Keren Woodward wrote lyrics and recorded their vocals over it. Bananarama didn't like the result, so they asked their producer Gary Miller to remix it. Miller's mix was issued as the A-side of the "I Found Love" single, as the "ROZI Mix".

When the album was released in the United States, it was re-titled Ultra Violet and "I Found Love" appeared as a bonus track only.

== Music video ==
The music video features the pair performing the song in large crinoline skirts in front of a mansion. These scenes are intercut with shots of the duo being driven through London.

== Remixes ==
Japanese 3-inch CD single

1. "I Found Love" (ROZI-Mix)
  Remixed by MAXImizor (aka Gary Miller)
2. "Every Shade of Blue"
3. "I Found Love" (Original Mix)

Other versions

1. "I Found Love" (Album Version)
2. "I Found Love" (Video Mix)
3. "I Found Love" (Remininsence Mix)
