= Ultra Violet (Bananarama album) =

Studio album by Bananarama
- Released: 21 August 1995
- Recorded: July 1993 – May 1994
- Genres: Pop; techno
- Label: Avex Trax
- Producer: Gary Miller

Bananarama chronology
Bunch of Hits (1993)	Ultra Violet (1995)	Master Series (1996)

Alternative cover
- Japanese cover

Singles from Ultra Violet
- 1. "Every Shade of Blue" Released: 21 August 1995; 2. "Take Me to Your Heart" Released: 30 December 1995

Professional ratings
Review scores
Source	Rating
AllMusic	link

Ultra Violet is the seventh studio album released by the English group Bananarama. Originally released under the title of I Found Love on 21 August 1995 only in Japan, the album was renamed as Ultra Violet and released on 2 February 1996 in Australia and some markets in Europe, such as Portugal and Spain. At the time of the original release, the album wasn't sold in the UK, the group's home market. Ultra Violet was eventually released in the United Kingdom on 7 August 2020. This also marked the first time the album was made available on vinyl as it was previously only available on compact disc and cassette.

== Background ==
The album was released on various labels internationally, including ZYX Records and DigIt International, as Bananarama had no major record deal after leaving London Records in 1993. Musically, the album continued Bananarama's Europop sound, and it was a success commercially.

The album's first single, "Every Shade of Blue", sold well enough in Canada to chart in the top 40 and also peaked at No. 124 in Australia. Two more singles were released including "I Found Love" and "Take Me to Your Heart", which was heavily remixed for the single version. "Take Me to Your Heart" peaked at No. 180 in Australia.

A digital-only single for "Prove Your Love" was released on the US iTunes store and Google Play Music store containing both an edited version as well as full-length version of the 'Harwood Heights Mix' of the track.

== Track listing ==
All tracks are written by Keren Woodward, Sara Dallin, Gary Miller, Paul Barry and Steve Torch, unless otherwise noted.

Ultra Violet
No.	Title	Writer(s)	Length
1.	"Every Shade of Blue"		4:12
2.	"Rhythm of Life"		3:58
3.	"Take Me to Your Heart"		3:55
4.	"Prove Your Love"		3:56
5.	"Take Me Away"		3:55
6.	"System"	Keren Woodward; Sara Dallin; Gary Miller; Steve Torch; Stephen William Lee	3:57
7.	"Maybe the Next Time"		4:02
8.	"You've Really Got Something"		3:36
9.	"Time Out"		3:52
10.	"Don't Stop Me Now"	Keren Woodward; Sara Dallin; Gary Miller; Paul Barry	4:23
11.	"Give In to Me"	Keren Woodward; Sara Dallin; Gary Miller; Paul Barry	3:48
12.	"I Found Love" (bonus track)	Keren Woodward; Sara Dallin; Tetsuya Komuro	4:24
Total length:			47:58

I Found Love
No.	Title	Length
1.	"I Found Love" (ROZI-Mix)
2.	"Every Shade of Blue"
3.	"Rhythm of Life"
4.	"Take Me to Your Heart"
5.	"Prove Your Love"
6.	"Take Me Away"
7.	"System"
8.	"Maybe the Next Time"
9.	"You've Really Got Something"
10.	"Time Out"
11.	"Don't Stop Me Now"
12.	"Give In to Me"
13.	"I Found Love"

== Personnel ==
Bananarama

- Sara Dallin – vocals
- Keren Woodward – vocals

Musicians

- Gary Miller – programming

Additional personnel

- Peter Barrett – sleeve design
- Andrew Biscomb – sleeve design
- Kate Garner – photography
- Gary Miller – producer
- Gary Miller, Paul Barry and Steve Torch – co-songwriters
- Tetsuya Komuro – co-songwriter on "I Found Love"
