= A Partial Print =

Studio album by Tiger Lou
- Released: 28 October 2008
- Genre: Indie rock
- Label: Startracks

Tiger Lou chronology
The Loyal (2005)	A Partial Print (2008)

Professional ratings
Review scores
Source	Rating
It's a Trap!	link

A Partial Print is the third studio album by Tiger Lou.

== Track listing ==
1. The More You Give (3:44)
2. The Less You Have To Carry (6:07)
3. So Demure (5:11)
4. Trust Falls (3:08)
5. An Atlas of Those Our Own (4:52)
6. Odessa (5:28)
7. Trails of Spit (4:01)
8. Coalitions (4:12)
9. Crushed by a Crowd (3:53)
10. A Partial Print (9:17)
