= Love Don't Live Here (Bananarama song) =

Single by Bananarama

from the album Viva
- B-side: "Every Shade of Blue 2010"; "Here Comes the Rain"; "The Runner"
- Released: 12 April 2010
- Label: Fascination
- Songwriters: Sara Dallin; Keren Woodward; Ian Masterson
- Producer: Ian Masterson

Bananarama singles chronology
"Love Comes" (2009)	"Love Don't Live Here" (2010)	"Baby It's Christmas" (2010)

"Love Don't Live Here" is a song written and recorded by the English pop duo Bananarama. It was released on 12 April 2010 as the second and final single from their tenth studio album Viva.

== Background ==
"Love Don't Live Here" was released on 11 April 2010 as digital download single and 12 April 2010 on vinyl and CD format. It was written by Bananarama members Sara Dallin and Keren Woodward with producer Ian Masterson. The B-side for the CD single is a new version of their 1995 song "Every Shade of Blue", while the B-side tracks for the vinyl editions are remixed versions of "The Runner" and a new song, "Here Comes the Rain".

== Music video ==
A music video for "Love Don't Live Here" was shot in London in January 2010. The video features heavily computerized effects and also scenes similar to the artwork on the sleeve of the CD single. The video was directed by photographer Tim Walker.

== Formats and track listings ==
- 7-inch vinyl
1. "Love Don't Live Here" (radio mix)
2. "Here Comes the Rain" (S. Dallin/K. Woodward/I. Masterson)
- 12-inch vinyl
1. "Love Don't Live Here" (Ian Masterson's extended mix)
2. "The Runner" (Buzz Junkies 12" mix) (G. Moroder/S. Ferguson)
- CD single
1. "Love Don't Live Here" (radio mix)
2. "Every Shade of Blue 2010" (S. Dallin/G. Miller/S. Torch/K. Woodward/P. Barry)
- iTunes Exclusive remix bundle
1. "Love Don't Live Here" (radio mix)
2. "Love Don't Live Here" (Ian Masterson's extended mix)
3. "The Runner" (Buzz Junkies 7" mix)
4. "The Runner" (Buzz Junkies 12" mix)

== Charts ==
Chart performance for "Love Don't Live Here"
Chart (2010)	Peak position
UK Singles (OCC)	114
