= Baby It's Christmas =

Single by Bananarama
- Released: 13 December 2010
- Genre: Xmas; dance
- Songwriters: Sara Dallin; Ian Masterson
- Producer: Ian Masterson

Bananarama singles chronology
"Love Don't Live Here" (2010)	"Baby It's Christmas" (2010)	"Now or Never" (2012)

"Baby It's Christmas" is a song recorded by the English girl group Bananarama, released on 13 December 2010 as a digital EP in the UK and most European territories. It debuted on the UK Singles Chart at number 199. The song reached number 19 in the UK Indie Chart.

== Background ==
The song is Bananarama's first Christmas record, excluding their contribution to "Do They Know It's Christmas?". It is an original Christmas song written by group member Sara Dallin and producer Ian Masterson.

The song was originally only planned to be included on a US digital compilation album Super Dance Christmas Party Vol. 3, released in November 2010. However, the group and Masterson were pleased with the track, thus decided to make it available to purchase by download in the UK and Europe. The song was released digitally on 13 December 2010 without any record label support. Remixes by production team Almighty were issued for the occasion.

It is Bananarama's first song not to be released in a physical format.

== Formats and track listings ==
Across the UK and some European territories, the song is available in two different bundles while in the US and Canada both radio edit and extended mix are individually available as part of the Super Dance Christmas Party Vol. 3 compilation.

- Digital download
1. "Baby It's Christmas" (radio edit)
2. "Baby It's Christmas" (extended mix)
- Digital download – The Remixes
1. "Baby It's Christmas" (Almighty radio edit)
2. "Baby It's Christmas" (Almighty dub)
3. "Baby It's Christmas" (Almighty club mix)
