= Neïmo =

Neimo
- Origin: France
- Genres: Indie rock Rock; Electronic
- Instruments: Guitar, keyboard, drums
- Labels: Big Field Records; Shangri-La Music
- Members: Bruno Alexandre (vocalist); Camille Troillard (guitarist); Matthieu Joly (keyboardist); Vincent Girault (drums)
- Website: http://www.myspace.com/neimo

Neimo is an indie rock band from France. The band pairs guitar with electronic elements to create a Euro-rock and 1980s sound. Neimo is influenced by David Bowie, Blondie, Emilie Simon, New Order, Velvet Underground and the Stooges.

== History ==
The band has not been widely accepted in France as the songs are all sung in English. According to the band's lead singer Bruno Alexandre, the band chose to compose the songs in English because "rock is based on sweat, spontaneity and energy. Sorry, but rock and roll was born in the United States." The debut album, From Scratch, was released under the band's own label, Big Field Records, on May 25, 2005. The band was not signed by a French record label because the songs were in English. French labels were reluctant to sign Neimo since they knew that the radio stations would not give the band much airtime because programming must be at least 40% French. In order to reach a larger audience in countries such as the United Kingdom, Germany and the United States, the band signed with the American label Shangri-La Music, in Santa Monica, California. Under this label, the band plans to release a second album in the spring of 2008 called Modern Incidental.

Work with Dannii Minogue

Neïmo co-wrote and produced 3 tracks on Australian pop star Dannii Minogue's UK top 10 gold selling album Neon Nights. The songs are "On the Loop", "Don't Wanna Lose This Feeling" and "A Piece of Time". "Don't Wanna Lose This Feeling" was chosen as the 4th single from the album and charted at No. 5 on the UK singles chart. Neïmo also did a mashup version of the single, merging it with Madonna's "Into the Groove". It was the only time Madonna allowed a sample of this song to be released commercially, and the track, called "Don't Wanna Lose This Groove", was a club hit.

== Lineup ==
- Bruno Alexandre: vocalist
- Camille Troillard: guitar
- Matthieu Joly: keyboard
- Alexis Hadefi: drums
- Vincent Girault: drums

== Discography ==
- From Scratch (2005)
- Self-titled EP (2007): "Echoing Pixels", "Hot Girl", "Vicious", "The Hourglass" and "Peter and the Wolves"
- Moderne Incidental (2008)
- Beast (2012)
