= My Mine =

Italian disco band

- Origin: Terni, Italy
- Genre: Italo disco
- Years active: 1983–1986, 2016–present
- Labels: Polydor, Memory
- Members: Carlo Malatesta; Danilo Rosati
- Past members: Stefano Micheli; Darren Hatch

My Mine is an Italo disco group formed in Terni, Italy in 1983.

== Biography ==
My Mine's first single, "Hypnotic Tango", became an international hit across Europe. After the release of their first single, the band recorded their second single titled "Zorro". Wanting to pursue a more innovative sound for "Zorro", the band spent roughly a month working on it. However, the trio made the mistake of leaving behind the sound that made "Hypnotic Tango" popular turning "Zorro" into a commercial failure.

After the failure of their second single, the band suffered through a tumultuous period. The band was advised by their production team to choose an English singer over Stefano Micheli. Arriving from London, Darren Hatch (son of songwriters Tony Hatch and Jackie Trent) took the role of main vocalist in 1985. With a new vocalist, My Mine began work on their first album, Stone, which was produced by Mauro Malavasi and recorded at Fonoprint Studios in Bologna. The band's intention focused on recovering the popularity and fame from their first single. Their last attempt at this was with "Can Delight", which the production deemed worthy play since it was "catchy" and according to them, "could bring them back to the fore". However, "Can Delight" did not prove enough and in 1986, the band broke off after the release of "Can Delight". After the split of My Mine, the group members spent a couple of years composing songs but without being able to produce any of them. In the words of Stefano Micheli: "Then gradually the many hours of work devoted to experimenting with new styles and new sounds began to seem sterile; at least some of us. We parted amicably."

In 2016, original members Carlo Malatesta and Danilo Rosati reformed My Mine with Ilaria Melis as its vocalist, releasing two singles, "Like a Fool" and "Love Is in the Sky".

In September 2023, to celebrate the 40th anniversary of "Hypnotic Tango", Benny Benassi and Albertino released a new remix of the song, which reached over 400,000 streams after its first month of release. The band planned to release a new EP for 2024, signing with AbNormal Music and working with Italian producer D4D (Giovanni De Rosa).

== Members ==
- Stefano Micheli - vocals, keyboards, trumpet (1983–1986, died 2025)
- Carlo Malatesta - vocals, keyboards (1983–1986, 2016–present)
- Danilo Rosati - keyboards, sequencer, drums (1983–1986, 2016–present)
- Darren T. Hatch - vocals, drums (1984–1986)
- Ilaria Melis - vocals (2016–2018)

== Discography ==
=== Albums ===
- 1985: Stone
- 1986: Can Delight (Japan only)

=== Singles ===
- 1983: "Hypnotic Tango" - #5 West Germany, #10 Switzerland, #32 Belgium
- 1984: "Zorro" - #63 West Germany
- 1985: "Cupid Girl"
- 1985: "Stone"
- 1986: "Can Delight"
- 2016: "Like a Fool"
- 2018: "Love Is in the Sky"
