= No More Days to Waste (album) =

Studio album by Aloha from Hell
- Released: January 16, 2009
- Recorded: 2008
- Genre: Pop punk, alternative rock
- Length: 44:47
- Label: Columbia

Singles from No More Days to Waste
- 1. "Don't Gimme That" Released: June 6, 2008; 2. "Walk Away" Released: November 14, 2008; 3. "No More Days to Waste" Released: April 3, 2009; 4. "Can You Hear Me Boys" Released: April 3, 2009

No More Days to Waste is the debut album by German pop punk band Aloha from Hell. It was released on January 16, 2009. The singles "Don't Gimme That", "Walk Away", "No More Days to Waste" and "Can You Hear Me Boys" were released from the album. Track ten "Girls Just Wanna Have Fun" is a cover of the original song by Cyndi Lauper. There are also two more covers: "Catch Me If You Can", original by Ana Johnsson and "How Come You Are The One" by Markus Fagervall.

== Track listing ==
Standard Edition
No.	Title	Length
1.	"No More Days to Waste"	3:01
2.	"Can You Hear Me Boys"	3:39
3.	"Don't Gimme That"	3:04
4.	"Fear of Tomorrow"	3:43
5.	"Walk Away"	4:12
6.	"Don't Hurt Yourself"	3:45
7.	"Wake Me Up"	3:22
8.	"Hello, Hello"	3:46
9.	"How Come You Are the One"	3:43
10.	"Girls Just Wanna Have Fun"	2:52
11.	"You (Bonus Track)"	3:07
12.	"Catch Me If You Can (Bonus Track)"	2:47
13.	"Don't Gimme That (Bonus Track - alternative rock version)"	3:22

iTunes & Spotify Edition
No.	Title	Length
14.	"Don't Hurt Yourself (Unplugged)"	3:50

Premium Edition
No.	Title	Length
14.	"So What's Going On?"	3:38
15.	"I'll Smash Your Mind"	3:26
16.	"My Love You Are (Unplugged)"	3:24
17.	"Can You Hear Me Boys (Unplugged)"	3:43
18.	"Don't Hurt Yourself (Unplugged)"	3:50

== Singles ==
Year	Title	Chart positions		
Year	Title	GER	AUT	JP
2008	Don't Gimme That	30	11	-
2008	Walk Away	26	70	-
2009	No More Days to Waste	59	-	11
2009	Can You Hear Me Boys	79	-	-
