= Take Me to Your Heart (Bananarama song) =

Single by Bananarama

from the album Ultra Violet
- Released: 30 December 1995
- Genre: Dance
- Label: ZYX; Curb; Popular; DigIt International; Festival
- Songwriters: Sara Dallin; Keren Woodward; Gary Miller; S. Torch; P. Barry
- Producer: Gary Miller

Bananarama singles chronology
"Every Shade of Blue" (1995)	"Take Me to Your Heart" (1995)	"Move in My Direction" (2005)

Music video
- "Take Me to Your Heart" on YouTube

"Take Me to Your Heart" is a ballad recorded by the English pop duo Bananarama from their seventh album, Ultra Violet (1995). The song was released in December 1995 as the second and final single from the album in Australasia, Germany and Scandinavia. It was also released promotionally in North America.

== Background ==
The song was remixed prior to its release as a single. Trance, techno, disco, and reggae versions were released, with the disco remix containing samples from Anita Ward's number-one single from 1979, "Ring My Bell".

Larry Flick from Billboard magazine described the song as a "springy number", noting that it is "covered in vibrant synths and a cute chorus that you'll be singing along with in moments."

== Music video ==
A music video was produced to promote the single. It appears to be one of their lowest budget productions and resembles a home movie, featuring Sara Dallin and Keren Woodward walking outdoors through fields of tall grass.

== Remixes ==
1. "Take Me To Your Heart" (Album Version) - (3:55)
  Taken from the CD albums "Ultra Violet" & "I Found Love"
2. "Take Me To Your Heart" (Radio Heart Edit) - (3:20)
3. "Take Me To Your Heart" (Electronic Heart Mix) - (6:02)
4. "Take Me To Your Heart" (Tony De Vit Trance Mix) - (7:51)
  Remixed by Tony De Vit
5. "Take Me To Your Heart" (Sweetbox Disco Mix) - (3:04)
6. "Take Me To Your Heart" (Mark Cyrus Reggae Mix) - (5:27)
  Remixed by Mark Cyrus
7. "Take Me To Your Heart" (Tony De Vit Radio Mix) - (4:46)
  Remixed by Tony De Vit

== Charts ==
Chart (1996)	Peak position
Australia (ARIA)	180
