= Murlyn Music Group =

Stockholm-based music production company

- Origin: Sweden
- Genre: Pop
- Years active: 1998 – present
- Members: Bagge & Peer -- (Anders Bagge and Peer Åström); Bloodshy & Avant -- (Christian Karlsson and Pontus Winnberg); Korpi & Blackcell -- (Henrik Korpi and Mathias Johansson); Arnthor Birgisson; David Eriksen; Fredrik "Fredro" Ödesjö
- Website: www.murlyn.se

Murlyn Music Group AB or just Murlyn Music (MMG) is Stockholm-based international music production company founded in 1997 by Anders Bagge. The company includes a great number of successful songwriters, producers and musicians and has produced and written material for tens of international artists.

The company has many studios in various locations (known as Murlyn Studios), a publishing division Murlyn Songs (initially headed by Pelle Lidell).

== History ==
Murlyn Music was founded in 1997 by Anders Bagge. He had been inspired by Denniz PoP's Cheiron. Murlyn's big breakthrough came with the US boy band 98 Degrees.

In 2001 Murlyn signed a marketing deal with Universal Music Group for distributing the catalogue of songs materials produced by Murlyn Music worldwide. Colin Barlow, Jimmy Iovine and Lucian Grainge proposed building a company around Murlyn's songwriting where they would develop acts together. Unfortunately this relationship with Interscope and Universal came at a time when the era's pop trend was fading and singer-songwriter acts were starting to dominate. Murlyn wanted to focus more on singer-songwriters, but the level of time and development required was something that the major label was reluctant to support.

In 2007 Bagge sold the publishing catalogue to Crosstown Songs in America.

== Songwriters / Producers ==
Murlyn Music Group has the following producers

- Bagge & Peer
  - Anders "Bag" Bagge
  - Peer Åström
- Bloodshy & Avant
  - Christian "Bloodshy" Karlsson
  - Pontus "Avant" Winnberg
- Korpi & Blackcell
  - Henrik Korpi
  - Mathias Johansson
- Arnthor Birgisson
- Tony Malm
- David Eriksen
- Fredrik "Fredro" Ödesjö.

Other producers under MMG include: Mats Berntoft, DeadMono, Jock-E, Hitvision, Aleena, Nina Woodford, Yoga, Jay Jay and Infinite Mass.

== Selective discography ==
- 98 Degrees
  - "Because of You"
  - "Give Me Just One Night (Una Noche)"
  - "You Are My Everything"
- Celine Dion
  - "Have You Ever Been In Love"
- Janet Jackson
  - "All Nite (Don't Stop)"
  - "SloLove"
  - "Put Your Hands On"
  - "I'm Here"
- Jennifer Lopez
  - "Play"
- Madonna
  - "Get Together"
  - "Like It Or Not"
  - "How High"
- Jessica Simpson
  - "Irresistible"
- Britney Spears
  - "Toxic"
- Lisa Maffia
  - "The Knack"
- Sugababes
  - "Supernatural"
  - Switch"

Others

- Kelis featuring Spragga Benz - "Fire"
- Christina Milian - "When You Look At Me" and "AM to PM"
- Rob Thomas - "This Is How A Heart Breaks"
- Rachel Stevens - "Sweet Dreams My LA Ex"
- Sophie Ellis-Bextor - "Get Over You"
- Samantha Mumba - "Gotta Tell You"
- Dannii Minogue - "Put The Needle On It"

Murlyn Music hits include singles and albums produced for Ricky Martin and Ronan Keating
