= Don't Gimme That (Aloha from Hell song) =

Single by Aloha from Hell

from the album No More Days to Waste
- A-side: "Don't Gimme That"
- B-side: "Fear Of Tomorrow"
- Released: June 6, 2008
- Recorded: 2008
- Genre: Pop rock, alternative rock
- Length: 3:02 (album version)
- Label: Sony
- Songwriter(s): Rory O'Connor
- Producer(s): Alex Wende, René Rennefeld

Aloha from Hell singles chronology
"Don't Gimme That" (2008)	"Walk Away" (2009)

"Don't Gimme That" is a song written by Rory O'Connor for German group Aloha from Hell's 2009 debut album No More Days to Waste. It was released as the album's first single on June 6, 2008. The song reached number thirty and number eleven in the German and Austrian Singles Charts respectively.

== Track listings ==
CD Single

1. "Don't Gimme That (Radio Version)" - 3:03
2. "Don't Gimme That (Alternative Rock Version)" - 3:20

CD Maxi Single

1. "Don't Gimme That (Radio Version)" - 3:03
2. "Don't Gimme That (Alternative Rock Version)" - 3:20
3. "Don't Gimme That (Private Room Remix)" - 3:08
4. "Fear Of Tomorrow" - 3:42

== Charts ==
Chart (2008)	Peak position
Austrian Singles Chart	11
German Singles Chart	30
