= Aloha from Hell =

German band

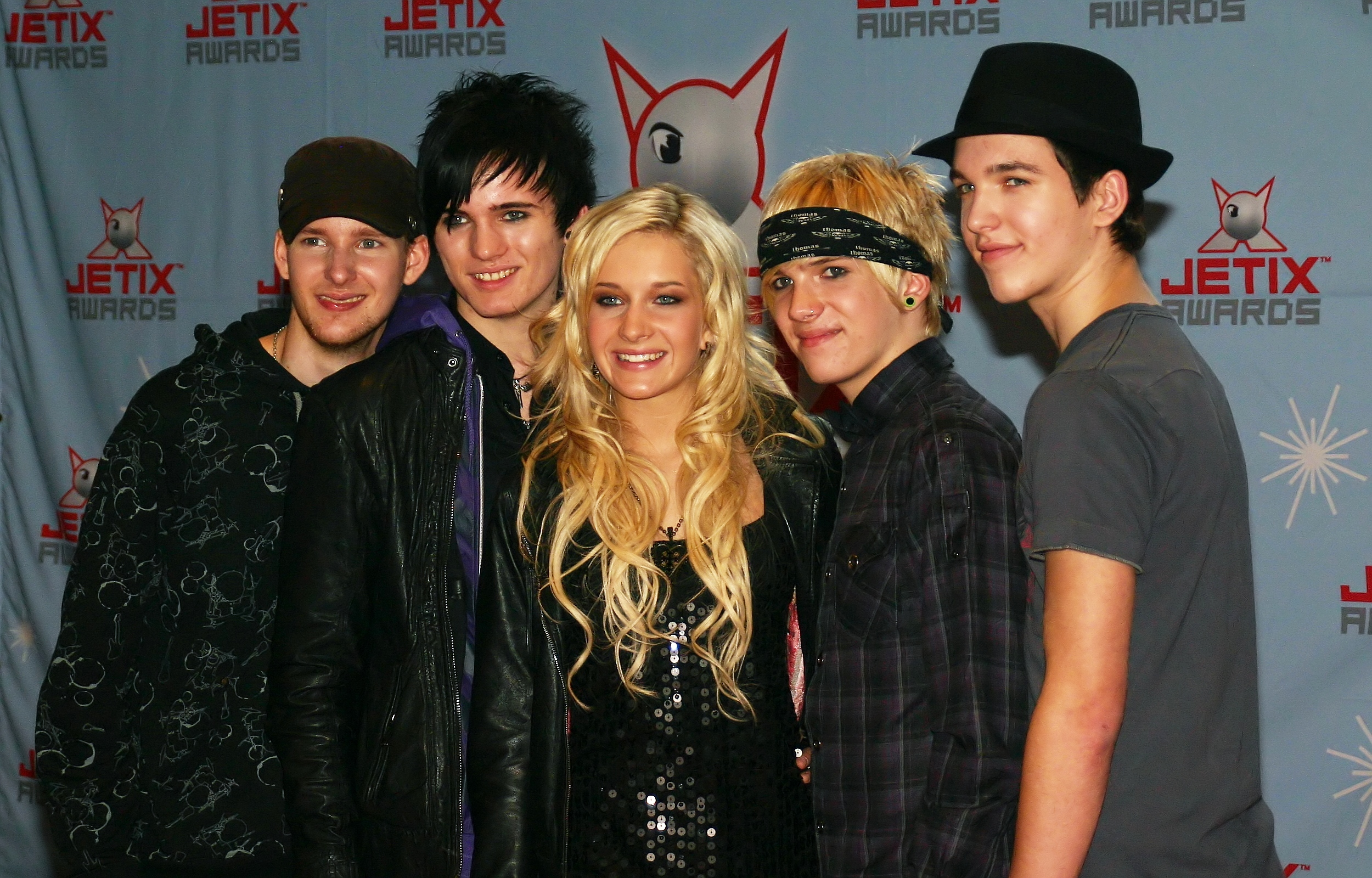

Background information
- Origin: Aschaffenburg, Germany
- Genres: Pop rock, alternative rock
- Years active: 2006–2010
- Labels: Sony Music
- Members: Vivi; Moo; Andy; Max; Feli

Aloha from Hell was a German rock band. They won a competition in the German magazine Bravo. After the win they released "Don't Gimme That." Their first album, No More Days to Waste, sold more than 200,000 copies.

== History ==
Aloha from Hell was founded in 2006. The band won German magazine Bravo's Newcomer Band Contest in August 2007, and as a result secured a record deal with Sony BMG soon after.

Although the band members were German, all their songs were sung in English.

The band split up in mid-2010.

== Discography ==
=== Albums ===
Year	Title	Chart position						Certification	Sales
Year	Title	GER	AUT	SWI	BEL	FR	JP	Certification	Sales
2009	No More Days to Waste: Released: 16 January 2009; Formats: CD, digital download; Label: Universal Music	12	35	92	31	124	10	GER: Gold; AUT: Gold; JP: Platinum	WW: 600.000+; GER: 100,000

== Extended plays ==
Year	EP details
2009	Aloha from Hell: Released on 11 June 2009; Labels: Cherry Tree/Interscope; Format: CD, digital Download
2010	Can You Hear Me Boys EP: Released on 24 January 2010; Labels: Universal Music; Format: CD, digital Download

=== Singles ===
Year	Title	Chart positions								Album
Year	Title	GER	AUT	SWI	BEL	FR	AUS	FIN	JP	Album
2008	"Don't Gimme That"	23	11	-	13	-	-	-	-	No More Days to Waste
2008	"Walk Away"	17	28	53	24	67	64	19	-	No More Days to Waste
2009	"No More Days to Waste"	59	74	-	-	-	-	-	11	No More Days to Waste
2009	"Can You Hear Me Boys"	74	-	-	-	-	-	-	14	No More Days to Waste

==== Other songs and appearances ====
Year	Song	Album	Notes
2009	"Fear of Tomorrow"	No More Days to Waste	the Twilight Saga: New Moon O.S.T.
2010	"Girls Just Wanna Have Fun"	No More Days to Waste	Cover of the original song by Cyndi Lauper, Promo in Japan

=== Awards ===
- 2008: Bayerischer Musiklöwe (Bavarian Lion of Music)
- 2009: Viva COMET : Breakthrough Artist of the year (nominated with: Eisblume, Polarkreis 18, Fady Maalouf and Queensberry)
