= Don't Wanna Lose This Feeling =

2003 single by Dannii Minogue

Single by Dannii Minogue

from the album Neon Nights
- B-side: "Goodbye Song"
- Released: 9 June 2003
- Recorded: Big Fields (Paris, France)
- Genre: Dance-pop; post-disco
- Length: 3:50
- Label: London; Ultra (US)
- Songwriters: Bruno Alexandre; Matthieu Joly; Dannii Minogue; Terry Ronald; James Theochari; Camille Troillard (LP version); Madonna Ciccone; Stephen Bray ("...Groove")
- Producers: Neïmo (LP version and "...Groove"); Al Stone (radio mix)

Dannii Minogue singles chronology
"I Begin to Wonder" (2003)	"Don't Wanna Lose This Feeling" (2003)	"You Won't Forget About Me" (2004)

Music video
- "Don't Wanna Lose This Feeling" on YouTube; "Don't Wanna Lose This Groove" on YouTube

"Don't Wanna Lose This Feeling" is a song by Australian singer Dannii Minogue from her fourth studio album, Neon Nights (2003). It was written by the singer with Bruno Alexandre, Matthieu Joly, James Theochari and Camille Troillard of Neimo; and with Minogue's long-time collaborator Terry Ronald.

"Don't Wanna Lose This Feeling" was remixed for single release and was also mashed-up with "Into the Groove" by Madonna (titled "Don't Wanna Lose This Groove") becoming the fourth and final single from Neon Nights in June 2003. The single peaked at number five in the United Kingdom and reached the top 40s in Australia, Belgium, France, Ireland, and Spain.

== Mashup ==
Minogue recorded three tracks in Paris with French indie-rock band/production team Neïmo for her album: "On the Loop", "A Piece of Time" and "Don't Wanna Lose This Feeling". "I was in one room sitting on the end of the bed with a microphone, with the cable coming under the door of the bedroom, and they were all sitting out in a tiny lounge room. That’s how we recorded the songs" remembered Minogue. Minogue and Terry Ronald enjoyed working with the trio, who used old synths, drum machines and vintage amps to achieve their sound but keeping it "pop" for the material. To strengthen the chorus, another songwriter James Khari took a pass at the song.

Inspired by the then-current mashup trend, the members of Neïmo produced a mix of the latter song over Madonna's 1985 single "Into the Groove". Minogue liked the mashup and her team asked Madonna for approval and permission to sample the track for official release, assuming that they had nothing to lose and that the answer would be a decline; they were surprised when Madonna's team replied that they wanted to release the mix. At the time both artists were signed to Warner Music and working new album releases; in a fortunate case of synchronicity Madonna's own album American Life was being promoted in the UK and Europe around the same time as Neon Nights. Madonna gave approval for the sample, including a vocal sample of "Now I know you're mine" from "Into the Groove (Dub)"; this was reportedly the first time Madonna had given permission for such a use of her work. Minogue described Madonna's approval as "the biggest, most amazing thing".

For the single release, "Don't Wanna Lose This Feeling" was remixed by Al Stone of production team Smoothside for radio play. An alternative single mix produced by Jewels and Stone ultimately went unused. Dance remixes for clubs and specialist radio were completed by Stella Browne, a house-disco production duo; and Jupiter Ace, an alias of electronic music producer Gregory Ferguson. In 2023, the track was remixed in a garage-style by Initial Talk for inclusion on Neon Nights 20, a super-deluxe repackage of the album to mark its twentieth anniversary.

== Music video ==
The "Don't Wanna Lose This Feeling" music video was directed by Phil Griffin on location in Spain. The video concept developed from both Griffin and Minogue wanting to film outside; as the single was scheduled for a summer release they had the idea of filming the video on a beach but, to make it stand out, film on a beach at night. To achieve the night effect, Minogue filmed her scenes under a tent to black-out the daytime sun. This footage then matched the crowd scenes that were filmed after sun down. Minogue spent 24 hours working on the music video, starting with dance rehearsals for the choreographed routines at eight in the morning, and then finishing filming her shots around eight o'clock the following day.

The video begins with Minogue sitting and dancing on the porch of a colourfully lit beach house. She is then shown sitting in a car and singing her lover. They are soon joined by a large group of dancing people on the beach. The video concludes with scenes of Minogue being filmed by her lover and performing a dance routine with two female backup dancers. The finished music video was serviced in two edits; one for the radio version and one for the "Groove" mashup. The "Don't Wanna Lose This Feeling" music video was made available as an enhanced track on the CD single formats then later released on The Hits & Beyond special edition bonus DVD and the Dannii Minogue: The Video Collection DVD.

== Critical reception ==
In a review for the single release, Music Week wrote that "Don't Wanna Lose This Feeling" was "a perfectly acceptable slice of disco-pop", but also noted that, as fourth single release from Neon Nights, it was unlikely to positively impact album sales.

== Chart performance ==
"Don't Wanna Lose This Feeling" was serviced to UK radio stations from 5 May 2003. A week later, Radio One put the single on their C-List and then upgraded it to B-List the following week where it remained for five weeks. "Don't Wanna Lose This Feeling" debuted at number 42 on the UK Airplay Chart as the number-one most added track and fastest growing at UK radio as Minogue previewed the single with pre-release performances on cd:uk, Top of the Pops and Popworld. The song peaked at number 13 on the UK Airplay Chart following the commercial single release.

On 9 June 2003, "Don't Wanna Lose This Feeling" was released to retail on 12-inch vinyl, cassette and CD single formats, where it debuted on the UK Singles Chart at number five. "Don't Wanna Lose This Feeling" spent nine weeks in the top 75. The single reached number 38 in Ireland and number 15 in Spain. Later in the year, "Don't Wanna Lose This Feeling" reached the top 50 in Belgium and France. In Minogue's homeland of Australia, "Don't Wanna Lose This Feeling" debuted at number 22 and remained on the ARIA Singles Chart for four weeks.

In March 2004, "Don't Wanna Lose This Feeling" was serviced to dance music radio stations in the United States. The song spent nine weeks on Billboard's Dance/Mix Show Airplay chart, peaking at number eight.

== Formats and track listings ==
UK cassette single

European CD single

1. "Don't Wanna Lose This Feeling" (radio version/edit) – 3:30
2. "Don't Wanna Lose This Groove" (radio version) – 3:16

UK CD single

1. "Don't Wanna Lose This Feeling" (Al Stone's radio edit) – 3:33
2. "Don't Wanna Lose This Groove" (radio version) – 3:16
3. "Goodbye Song" (Terry Ronald, Ian Masterson) – 3:50
4. "Don't Wanna Lose This Feeling" (music video)

UK 12-inch vinyl single

1. "Don't Wanna Lose This Feeling" (Stella Brown vocal mix) – 6:49
2. "Don't Wanna Lose This Groove" (extended remix) – 5:06
3. "I Begin to Wonder" (DJ Bardot remix) – 7:48

Australian CD single

1. "Don't Wanna Lose This Feeling" (Al Stone's radio Edit) – 3:33
2. "Don't Wanna Lose This Groove" (radio version) – 3:16
3. "Don't Wanna Lose This Feeling" (Stella Brown vocal mix) – 6:49
4. "Don't Wanna Lose This Groove" (extended bootleg mix) – 5:06
5. "Goodbye Song" – 3:50

French CD single

1. "Don't Wanna Lose This Groove" (radio version) – 3:16
2. "Don't Wanna Lose This Feeling" (radio version) – 3:33
3. "I Begin to Wonder" - Logiciel De Remix (Mac/PC) mixing software

== Personnel ==
Personnel are lifted from the CD single liner notes.

- Dannii Minogue – lead vocals
- Neïmo, Al Stone – production
- Etienne Colin – mixing
- Loolah – photography

== Charts ==
=== Weekly charts ===
Chart (2003)	Peak position
Australia (ARIA)	22
Belgium (Ultratop 50 Flanders)	43
Belgium (Ultratop 50 Wallonia)	39
Europe (Eurochart Hot 100)	19
France (SNEP)	40
Ireland (IRMA)	38
Netherlands (Single Top 100)	66
Scottish Singles Sales (Official Charts)	8
Spain (Promusicae)	15
Romania (Romanian Top 100) Don't Wanna Lose This Groove	17
UK Singles (Official Charts)	5
UK Dance (Official Charts)	2
US Dance Airplay (Billboard)	8

=== Year-end charts ===
Chart (2003)	Position
UK Singles (OCC)	199

== Release history ==
Region	Date	Format(s)	Label(s)	Ref.
United Kingdom	9 June 2003	12-inch vinyl; CD; cassette	London	
Australia	14 July 2003	CD	London	
Worldwide	21 May 2021	Digital EP	London Music Stream	
Worldwide	19 April 2023	Digital Single (Initial Talk Remix)	London Music Stream	
