= Jean Claude Ades =

- Also known as: Krystal K, J.C.A., JCA
- Origin: Germany
- Genres: House, electro, techno, deep house
- Occupation: DJ / Music producer
- Years active: 1995-present
- Label: B!CRAZY
- Website: www.jeanclaudeades.com

Jean Claude Ades is a German-born electronic music producer. He has resided and worked in Italy, France, and Spain, specialising in house and electro music.

== Biography ==
Ades started DJ-ing at the age of 16. In 1995, he released his first single under the artist name J.C.A. In 2002, he changed it to Krystal K. In 2006, he founded his own label, B!CRAZY, which currently is also an entertainment venue in Ibiza owned by Ades. He gained further prominence by releasing digital tracks through Beatport during the 2010s.

Ades gained worldwide popularity after releasing "Shingaling" in April 2008 alongside another French producer Thomas Vincent. The track is a mixture of electrotech and tribal house and features samples from the 1968 salsa hit "Shingaling Shingaling" by Puerto-Rican band Kako & His Orchestra.

In 2019, Ades moved to a private villa in Mykonos (Greece), where he resides up to this day. He has released mixtape podcasts since the COVID-19 pandemic.

=== Notable contributions ===
Particularly noted for his work with pop and dance vocalist Dannii Minogue, Jean Claude Ades co-wrote and produced Minogue's biggest hit "I Begin to Wonder", under the pseudonym J.C.A., along with three further tracks, "Come and Get It", "Feel Like I Do" and "Free Falling". He also helped produce the song "Lovers Till the End" with Christian Burns, for the album Simple Modern Answers.

His better known remixes include that of The Nightcrawlers' "Push The Feeling On", Coburn's "We Interrupt this Programme", Tomcraft's "Da Disco", The Roc Project's "Never (Past Tense)", and iiO's "At the End". Ades' hit singles include "Some Day", "Fly Away", "Nite Time", and Angel City's "Love Me Right (Oh Sheila)"

Under the alias Krystal K, while residing in Munich, Germany, he produced a major hit on the Billboard Dance Top 40 chart in 2004, with "Let's Get It Right".

== Discography ==
(selective)

as Krystal K

- 2002: Krystal K. - "Let's Get It Right"
- 2003: Dannii Minogue - "I Begin to Wonder"

as J.C.A / JCA

- 1995: J.C.A. feat. Alexxa - "The Colour of My Style"
- 1998: J.C.A. - "I Want You"
- 2002: J.C.A. – "I Begin to Wonder"
- 2003: J.C.A. - "I'll See Her Again"
- 2003: J.C.A. feat. Dannii Minogue - "Come And Get It"
- 2003: J.C.A. Remix - "Sans Contrefaçon" (Mylène FARMER song)
- 2005: JCA - "Fly Away"
- 2005: JCA - "Some Day"
- 2005: J.C.A. & Melih Ask - "Journey to Istanbul"
- 2008: JCA Presents Solaphonics - Total Love
- 2012: JCA feat. Tyra - "Only Tonight"

as Jean Claude Ades

- 2008: Jean Claude Ades - Finally (album)
- 2010: Jean Claude Ades & Mantu – "Blue Note"
- 2012: Jean Claude Ades - We All Are Dancing
- 2012: Jean Claude Ades and Rony Seikaly - East West EP
- 2012: Jean Claude Ades - You Make Me Feel
- 2013: Jean Claude Ades & Sharam Jey – Happy Mondays EP
- 2013: Jean Claude Ades - Be Crazy Friends #1
- 2014: Jean Claude Ades - Coming Home EP
- 2014: Jean Claude Ades - East West EP, Vol. 2
- 2015: Jean Claude Ades - Red Bus EP
- 2016: Jean Claude Ades - Out of My Head
- 2016: Jean Claude Ades - Between Spaces EP
- 2017: Jean Claude Ades - Appassionata / Ordinary Day
- 2018: Jean Claude Ades FT. Sterea - Ordinary Day (Tone Depth Remix)
- 2019: Jean Claude Ades - Illusion
- 2019: Jean Claude Ades - Atme
- 2020: Jean Claude Ades - Best of 2010 - 2020

=== Charting singles ===
List of singles, with selected chart positions
Title	Year	Peak chart positions
Title	Year	AUS
"I Begin to Wonder"	2002	78
"Fly Away"	2006	79
