= Cristín Leach =

Irish author, radio and television presenter, journalist, and art critic

- Born: 8 January 1976 (age 46); Dublin, Ireland
- Education: BA, MA
- Known for: Art Critic
- Notable work: Through the Canvas 'Negative Space - Memoir

Cristín Leach (born 8 January 1976) is an Irish author, radio and television presenter, journalist, and art critic.

== Biography ==
Leach began her journalism career when she was eight, working for the RTÉ Guide as one of their young book reviewers. She achieved a BA in French and English, an MA in Journalism, and a diploma in the History of European Painting. Her professional radio career began with East Coast FM, which led to her getting a position with RTÉ Online in 1998. Leach led the first online arts identity for RTÉ Interactive, which featured original video content, in 2001. In 2003, Leach began working for The Sunday Times Ireland edition and since then has served as the paper's longest-running art critic. While working for the Sunday Times, Leach has also worked as an on-screen and on-air reporter and presenter. She is a regular panelist and has produced art programs for both television and radio. She was shortlisted for Critic of the year in 2018 and her radio show Through the Canvas won silver in the New York Festival.

Leach has occasionally worked as the curator of art exhibitions in Ireland. She is a judge for the Hearsay International Audio Arts Festival and was a judge for the Hennessy Portrait Prize in its first year, 2014.

Leach also works as a lecturer in critical Journalism and has taught in the University of Limerick and University College Dublin.

TV and radio appearances include: The Works, The View, Arena, 57 Live, The Full Irish, The Arts Show, Rattlebag, Into the Evening, Masterpiece: Ireland’s Favourite Painting, and Through the Canvas.

Her debut book Negative Space, a collection of personal essays blended with art criticism, was published in 2022 and met with critical acclaim.

== Bibliography ==
• Leach, Cristin. Negative Space. S.l: Merrion Press, 2022. ISBN 9781785371912
