= Lovefreekz =

Lovefreekz is the alias of English electronic record producer Mark Hadfield. In 2004, his single "Shine", re-creating a sample of the Electric Light Orchestra's 1979 track "Shine a Little Love", became an international club hit, reaching number 22 on the Billboard Hot Dance Airplay chart in its 2 April 2005 issue during its four-week run. The single was also featured in episode five of series one of How I Met Your Mother in a scene where Marshall is dancing to the song in a nightclub. The track also reached number 6 on the UK Singles Chart.

== Discography ==
=== Singles ===
List of singles, with selected chart positions
Title	Year	Peak chart positions			
Title	Year	UK	AUS	BEL (FL)	US Dance
"Shine"	2004	6	45	32	22
