= Who Do You Love Now? =

2001 single by Riva and Dannii Minogue

Single by Riva featuring Dannii Minogue

from the album Neon Nights
- Released: 19 November 2001
- Length: 3:26
- Label: Double F Double R
- Songwriters: Jon Riva; Victoria Horn
- Producer: Riva

Dannii Minogue singles chronology
"Everlasting Night" (1999)	"Who Do You Love Now?" (2001)	"Put the Needle on It" (2002)

Music video
- "Who Do You Love Now?" on YouTube

"Who Do You Love Now?" is a song by Dutch DJ duo Riva and Australian singer Dannii Minogue. The song was released on 19 November 2001 through the Double F Double R label. The track originally began as an instrumental-only track called "Stringer", which soon became a club hit. It was later adapted into a vocal version for Minogue, written by Victoria Horn. For the Canadian market, Minogue recorded a French-language version of the song called "Est-ce que tu m'aimes encore?". Initially released as a stand-alone single, the song was later included on Minogue's fourth studio album Neon Nights (2003).

"Who Do You Love Now?" peaked at number three on the UK Singles Chart, becoming Riva's third top 10 in the United Kingdom and Minogue's fifth. It reached the top 20 in Australia and Canada and the top 30 in Sweden. In the United States, "Who Do You Love Now?" was successful on the Billboard dance charts, where it reached the top position on the Dance Club Play chart. The single was also played heavily in gay clubs around Australia, New Zealand and Europe. The song marked a turning point for Minogue, who was once again going through contractual changes, and was a bridging point between her previous work and the then upcoming Neon Nights album.

== Track listings ==
Australian maxi-CD single

1. "Who Do You Love Now? (Stringer)" (radio version) – 3:26
2. "Who Do You Love Now? (Stringer)" (Monoboy remix) – 6:53
3. "Who Do You Love Now? (Stringer)" (Larry Lush Ambient remix) – 7:14

UK maxi-CD single

1. "Who Do You Love Now? (Stringer)" (radio version) – 3:26
2. "Who Do You Love Now? (Stringer)" (Monoboy remix) – 6:53
3. "Who Do You Love Now? (Stringer)" (Larry Lush Ambient remix) – 7:14
4. "Who Do You Love Now? (Stringer)" (enhanced CD-ROM video) – 3:25

UK 12-inch single

A1. "Who Do You Love Now? (Stringer)" (extended vocal version) – 5:10
B1. "Stringer" (original mix) – 6:26
B2. "Stringer" (Tall Paul remix) – 7:16

UK cassette single and European CD single

1. "Who Do You Love Now? (Stringer)" (radio version) – 3:26
2. "Who Do You Love Now? (Stringer)" (Monoboy remix) – 6:53

Dutch CD single

1. "Who Do You Love Now? (Stringer)" (radio edit) – 3:26
2. "Who Do You Love Now? (Stringer)" (extended vocal version) – 5:10

German 12-inch single

A1. "Who Do You Love Now? (Stringer)" (Future Breeze remix club) – 8:45
A2. "Who Do You Love Now? (Stringer)" (Future Breeze remix instrumental) – 8:45
B1. "Who Do You Love Now? (Stringer)" (John Johnson remix) – 9:36
B2. "Who Do You Love Now? (Stringer)" (John Johnson instrumental) – 9:36

== Charts ==
=== Weekly charts ===
Weekly chart performance for "Who Do You Love Now?"
Chart (2001–2002)	Peak position
Australia (ARIA)	15
Australian Dance (ARIA)	2
Austria (Ö3 Austria Top 40)	21
Belgium (Ultratop 50 Flanders)	10
Belgium (Ultratip Bubbling Under Wallonia)	8
Canada (Nielsen SoundScan)	19
Denmark (Tracklisten)	13
Europe (Eurochart Hot 100)	19
Finland (Suomen virallinen lista)	14
Germany (GfK)	14
Ireland (IRMA)	20
Ireland Dance (IRMA)	4
Netherlands (Dutch Top 40)	19
Netherlands (Single Top 100)	26
Romania (Romanian Top 100)	13
Scottish Singles Sales (Official Charts)	2
Spain (Promusicae)	18
Sweden (Sverigetopplistan)	25
Switzerland (Schweizer Hitparade)	35
UK Singles (Official Charts)	3
UK Dance (Official Charts)	5

=== Year-end charts ===
2001 year-end chart performance for "Who Do You Love Now?"
Chart (2001)	Position
UK Singles (OCC)	91

2002 year-end chart performance for "Who Do You Love Now?"
Chart (2002)	Position
Australian Dance (ARIA)	15
Canada (Nielsen SoundScan)	156

== Release history ==
Release dates and formats for "Who Do You Love Now?"
Region	Date	Format(s)	Label(s)	Ref.
United Kingdom	19 November 2001	CD; cassette	Double F Double R	
Australia	10 December 2001	CD	Double F Double R	
Australia	2 September 2002	12-inch vinyl	Double F Double R	
