= Korpi & Blackcell =

Korpi & Blackcell is a Swedish record producing partnership between Henrik Korpi and Mathias Johansson (a.k.a. "Blackcell").

The partnership is responsible for a string of international hits for a number of renowned artists. They also released many recording remix productions under the theme "Korpi and Blackcell Dub".

Their break came with Blackcell's producing of Sophie Ellis-Bextor's hit "Get Over You" (No. 3 UK Singles Chart) and her album Read My Lips (No. 2 UK Albums Chart). Korpi & Blackcell also co-wrote and produced Dannii Minogue's hit "Put the Needle on It" and contributed to her album Neon Nights. In 2005, the team produced Bananarama's "Move in My Direction" (No. 14 UK Singles Chart). They have also produced for artists including Girls Aloud, Natalie Imbruglia, A-Teens, Geri Halliwell, and Holly Valance.
