= Mathias Johansson (producer) =

Swedish songwriter and record producer

Mathias Johansson also known as Blackcell is a Swedish songwriter and record producer who has worked and as a partnership producing team with Henrik Korpi under the name Korpi & Blackcell.

Mathias Johansson (Blackcell) started in Gothenburg part circuit and later on he became singer/frontman for Swedish band Solomon. He took part in live performances as backing vocals for the band Tiger Lou. His big break came when he co-produced in partnership with Henrik Korpi Sophie Ellis-Bextor's hit "Get Over You" (#3 in UK's Singles Chart) and her album Read My Lips (#2 on the UK album charts).

He joined Murlyn Music Group as a writer/producer teaming up mainly with Henrik Korpi with whom he formed the "Korpi & Blackcell" partnership . Blackcell plays guitar, bass, piano and drums. He is also an accomplished programmer and studio engineer.

Johansson is responsible for a string of international hits for a number of renowned artists.
