= Henrik Korpi =

Swedish record producer

Henrik Korpi (born Gothenburg) is a Swedish songwriter, record producer with Murlyn Music Group. He also is known for collaborating with Mathias Johansson ("Blackcell") under the name Korpi & Blackcell and releasing many recording productions as "Korpi and Blackcell".

In the early 1990s, Henrik Korpi moved to London, United Kingdom, where he worked in the London club scene. He released electronica records under the name Pigforce (on 4th & Broadway / Island Records). In 1999, he was approached by Murlyn Music and settled back in Sweden working for the music group.

He has written and produced a number of important international artists including Bananarama, Dannii Minogue, Geri Halliwell, Sophie Ellis-Bextor, Holly Valance, Aloha from Hell, Stefanie Heinzmann, The Tweenies.

Currently involved in the group The Amplifetes (www.theamplifetes.com), 2010 they released their debut album and been frequently gigging across Europe.
