= S Club 8 discography =

- Studio albums: 2
- Singles: 9
- Music videos: 7

The discography of S Club 8, a British pop group, who released two studio albums, seven singles and seven music videos. It also features one album, two singles and two music videos released from the TV series I Dream.

The group formed as S Club Juniors in 2001 and their debut album, Together, was released by Polydor and Universal Records in the United Kingdom in October 2002. Their debut single, "One Step Closer", reached number two in the United Kingdom upon its release in April 2002. The album also included the singles "Automatic High", "New Direction" and "Puppy Love". The album peaked at number five on the UK Albums Chart and was certified silver by the British Phonographic Industry (BPI).

The group released their second album, Sundown, which peaked eight places lower at number 13 in the UK. The album spawned the singles "Fool No More", "Sundown" and "Don't Tell Me You're Sorry". In 2004, the group appeared as characters on the children's television series I Dream and subsequently recorded the album Welcome to Avalon Heights under the name I Dream. Frankie Sandford and Calvin Goldspink, two members of the group, released a further single titled "Dreaming".

== Albums ==
=== Studio albums ===
Title	Details	Peak chart positions		Certifications (sales thresholds)
Title	Details	UK	IRE	Certifications (sales thresholds)
Together	Released: 21 October 2002; Label: Polydor; Formats: CD	5	32	BPI: Platinum
Sundown	Released: 13 October 2003; Label: Polydor; Formats: CD	13	—	BPI: Silver

=== Soundtrack albums ===
Title	Details
Welcome to Avalon Heights	Released: 30 September 2004; Label: Polydor; Formats: CD

== Singles ==
Year	Single	Peak chart positions			Certifications	Album
Year	Single	UK	IRE	EU	Certifications	Album
2002	"One Step Closer"	2	5	14	BPI: Silver	Together
2002	"Automatic High"	2	8	—	BPI: Silver	Together
2002	"New Direction"	2	7	12		Together
2002	"Puppy Love/Sleigh Ride"	6	8	—		Together
2003	"Fool No More"	4	20	—		Sundown
2003	"Sundown"	4	12	—		Sundown
2003	"Don't Tell Me You're Sorry"	11	25	—		Sundown
