= American Juniors =

2003 American reality television series

- Genre: Interactive talent show; Reality show
- Created by: Simon Fuller
- Directed by: Bruce Gowers
- Presented by: Ryan Seacrest; Gladys Knight
- Judges: Debbie Gibson; Gladys Knight; Justin Guarini; Nick Carter; Lamont Dozier; Mary Wilson; Brian McKnight; Jordan Knight; Monica; Dionne Warwick
- Opening theme: "One Step Closer" by S Club Juniors
- Country of origin: United States
- Original language: English
- No. of seasons: 1
- No. of episodes: 17

Production
- Executive producers: Nigel Lythgoe; Ken Warwick
- Production companies: FremantleMedia North America; 19 Entertainment

Original release
- Network: Fox
- Release: June 3 – August 19, 2003

American Juniors is an American reality television singing competition series that was broadcast for one season from June 3 to August 19, 2003, on Fox. The series was a spin-off of American Idol, but with younger contestants. The show had the same production team as American Idol: it was created by Simon Fuller and 19 Entertainment along with FremantleMedia, directed by Bruce Gowers, and produced by Nigel Lythgoe and Ken Warwick.

Unlike American Idol, the goal of the competition was not to find a single winner, but rather to create a singing group of five of the contestants. In this way, American Juniors more closely resembled the British series S Club Search, which had produced the group S Club Juniors.

The show spawned the singing group American Juniors, consisting of Taylor Thompson, Tori Thompson, Chauncey Matthews, Lucy Hale, and Danielle White. The group disbanded in 2005, after their self-titled studio album generated lackluster sales.

The show was filmed in Los Angeles.

== Episodes ==
=== Auditions and Hollywood Week (June 3 and 10) ===
Two thousand young people auditioned for the show. A selected group of kids and their parents were flown to Hollywood to participate in "Hollywood Week", during which the field was narrowed to 20 performers who would move on to the live episodes.

=== Top 20 Semi-Final 1: Contestant Choice (June 17 and 18) ===
In each of two live "Top 20" semifinals, half of the remaining contestants competed for 5 positions in the Top 10, as determined by the votes of viewers. The results were aired the following evening.

Contestant	Song (Original artist)	Result
Morgan Burke	"Why Do Fools Fall in Love" (Frankie Lymon and The Teenagers)	Top 5
Kara Lieberman	"Hopelessly Devoted to You" (Olivia Newton-John)	Eliminated
Kristinia DeBarge	"Reflection" (Christina Aguilera)	Eliminated
AJ Melendez	"Isn't She Lovely?" (Stevie Wonder)	Top 5
Grace Leer	"To Sir with Love" (Lulu)	Eliminated
Danielle White	"Colors of the Wind" (Vanessa L. Williams)	Top 5
Chauncey Matthews	"A Whole New World" (Peabo Bryson and Regina Belle)	Top 5 (most votes)
Julie Dubela	"Rainy Days and Mondays" (The Carpenters)	Eliminated
Tyler Foehr	"Every Little Thing She Does Is Magic" (The Police)	Eliminated
Katelyn Tarver	"Ain't No Mountain High Enough" (Marvin Gaye and Tammi Terrell)	Top 5

Results

- Advanced to Top 10 Finals: Chauncey Matthews (most votes), Danielle White, AJ Melendez, Morgan Burke, Katelyn Tarver
- Celebrity performers: Justin Guarini
- Group performance: "Kids in America"

=== Top 20 Semi-Final 2: Contestant Choice (June 24 and 25) ===
Contestant	Song (Original artist)	Result
Jordan McCoy	"Stupid Cupid" (Connie Francis)	Top 5
Lucy Hale	"Get Here" (Brenda Russell)	Top 5
Quinton Caruthers	"You Are the Sunshine of My Life" (Stevie Wonder)	Eliminated
Lauren Klena	"L-O-V-E" (Nat King Cole)	Eliminated
Chantel Kohl	"Open Arms" (Journey)	Top 5
Brennan Hillard	"That Thing You Do" (The Wonders)	Eliminated
Mercedes Ruiz	"Can't Fight the Moonlight" (LeAnn Rimes)	Eliminated
Taylor Thompson	"The Shoop Shoop Song (It's in His Kiss)" (Betty Everett)	Top 5
Canyon Grove	"You've Got a Friend" (Carole King)	Eliminated
Tori Thompson	"Let 'Er Rip" (Dixie Chicks)	Top 5 (most votes)

Results

- Advanced to Top 10 Finals: Tori Thompson (most votes), Taylor Thompson, Jordan McCoy, Lucy Hale, Chantel Kohl
- Celebrity performers: Ruben Studdard
- Group performance: "Put a Little Love in Your Heart"

=== Top 10 (July 1 and 2) ===
Theme: Songs of 1969

Contestant	Song (Original artist)	Result
AJ Melendez	"My Cherie Amour" (Stevie Wonder)	Returned
Katelyn Tarver	"I'll Never Fall in Love Again" (Dionne Warwick)	Returned
Jordan McCoy	"More Today Than Yesterday" (Spiral Starecase)	Returned
Chantel Kohl	"You've Made Me So Very Happy" (Blood, Sweat & Tears)	Top 2
Chauncey Matthews	"This Guy's in Love With You" (Herb Alpert)	Returned
Morgan Burke	"Build Me Up Buttercup" (The Foundations)	Returned
Lucy Hale	"I'm Gonna Make You Love Me" (Diana Ross & The Supremes and The Temptations)	Returned
Tori Thompson	"Bad Moon Rising" (Creedence Clearwater Revival)	Top 3
Danielle White	"Good Morning Starshine" (Hair stage musical)	Returned
Taylor Thompson	"Proud Mary" (Creedence Clearwater Revival)	1st (voted into the group)

Results

- Top 3: Chantel Kohl, Tori Thompson, and Taylor Thompson
- Top 2: Chantel Kohl and Taylor Thompson
- Advanced to American Juniors Group: Taylor Thompson
- Group performance: "Make Your Own Kind Of Music"
- Celebrity performers: Tamyra Gray
- Taylor's encore performance : "Proud Mary" (Creedence Clearwater Revival)

=== Top 9 (July 8 and 16) ===
- Theme: Songs of 1970
- Tori Thompson - "Love The One You're With" (Stephen Stills)
- Danielle White - "(They Long To Be) Close To You" (Burt Bacharach)
- Morgan Burke - "Love Grows (Where My Rosemary Goes) (Edison Lighthouse)
- Chauncey Matthews - "Hey There Lonely Girl" (Eddie Holman)
- Chantel Kohl - "Stony End" (Barbra Streisand)
- Jordan McCoy - "ABC" (Jackson 5)
- Katelyn Tarver - "We've Only Just Begun" (Carpenters)
- AJ Melendez - "I'll Be There" (Jackson 5)
- Lucy Hale - "Make It Easy On Yourself" (Dionne Warwick)

Results

- Top 3: AJ Melendez, Tori Thompson, and Chauncey Matthews
- Top 2: Chauncey Matthews and Tori Thompson
- Advanced To American Juniors Group: Tori Thompson
- Group performance: "United We Stand"
- Taylor Thompson's music video: "Cheeseburgers For Me"
- Celebrity performer: Brian McKnight
- Tori's encore performance: "Love The One You're With" (Stephen Stills)

=== Top 8 (July 23 and 24) ===
- Theme: Songs of 1962
- AJ Melendez - "The Night Has a Thousand Eyes" (Bobby Vee)
- Danielle White - "The Loco-Motion" (Little Eva)
- Chantel Kohl - "Don't Make Me Over" (Dionne Warwick)
- Chauncey Matthews - "Moon River" (Henry Mancini)
- Lucy Hale - "Breaking Up Is Hard to Do" (Neil Sedaka)
- Morgan Burke - "Can't Help Falling in Love" (Elvis Presley)
- Jordan McCoy - "Sealed with a Kiss" (Brian Hyland)
- Katelyn Tarver - "Tell Him" (The Exciters)

Results

- Top 3: Lucy Hale, Chauncey Matthews, and Chantel Kohl
- Top 2: Chauncey Matthews and Chantel Kohl
- Advanced to American Juniors Group: Chauncey Matthews
- Group performance: "Do You Love Me"
- Taylor Thompson and Tori Thompson's music video: Bring the house down
- Celebrity performer: Kelly Clarkson
- Chauncey's encore performance: "Moon River" (Henry Mancini)

=== Top 7 (July 29 and 30) ===
- Theme: Songs of 1980
- Katelyn Tarver - "On the Radio" (Donna Summer)
- Morgan Burke - "Rock With You" (Michael Jackson)
- Jordan McCoy - "Magic" (Olivia-Newton John)
- Danielle White - "Daydream Believer" (Anne Murray)
- AJ Melendez - "Still" (Commodores)
- Chantel Kohl - "Brass In Pocket (I'm Special)" (Pretenders)
- Lucy Hale - "Call Me" (Blondie)

Results

- Top 3: AJ Melendez, Lucy Hale, and Chantel Kohl
- Top 2: Lucy Hale and Chantel Kohl
- Advanced to American Juniors Group: Lucy Hale
- Group performance: "It's Still Rock and Roll to Me"
- Taylor Thompson, Tori Thompson, and Chauncey Matthews's music video: Sundown
- Celebrity performer: Monica
- Lucy's encore performance: "Call Me" (Blondie)

=== Final Round (August 5 and 12) ===
- Theme: S Club Songs
- Morgan Burke - "Bring the House Down" (S Club 7)
- Danielle White - "Never Had a Dream Come True" (S Club 7)
- AJ Melendez - "Alive" (S Club)
- Jordan McCoy - "You Are the One" (S Club Juniors)
- Chantel Kohl - "Sundown" (S Club 8)
- Katelyn Tarver - "Have You Ever" (S Club 7)

Results

- Top 3: Danielle White, Chantel Kohl, and AJ Melendez
- Top 2: Danielle White and Chantel Kohl
- Final member of American Juniors: Danielle White
- Morgan Burke performs: "Build Me Up Buttercup"
- Katelyn Tarver performs: "I'll Never Fall In Love Again"
- Chantel Kohl performs: "Open Arms"
- Jordan McCoy performs: "More Today Than Yesterday"
- Danielle White performs: "Colors of the Wind"
- AJ Melendez performs: "I'll Be There"
- Group performance: "Kids In America"
- Danielle White's Encore performance: "Never Had a Dream Come True"
- Chantel Kohl's Encore performance: "Sundown"
- AJ Melendez's Encore performance: "Alive"
- Official American Juniors group perform: "One Step Closer"

=== Concert Special (August 19) ===
- American Juniors performs: "Reach" (S Club 7)
- Danielle White and the American Juniors performs: "Never Had a Dream Come True" (S Club 7)
- American Juniors performs: "Bring It All Back" (S Club 7)
- Debbie Gibson performs "Lost in Your Eyes"
- Lucy Hale and the American Juniors performs: "Have You Ever" (S Club 7)
- Gladys Knight performs: "If I Could" (Nancy Wilson)
- Gladys Knight and the American Juniors perform
- American Juniors performs: "One Step Closer" (S Club Juniors)
- American Juniors performs: "(You Got to Have) Friends" (Bette Midler)

== Ratings and aborted second season ==
American Juniors became one of the highest-rated television shows of the summer season, with approximately 11.9 million viewers on June 3, though the numbers dropped 40% toward the end of July. Nonetheless, the producers were satisfied of the strong teen demographic. A second season was planned for fall 2003, later postponed to the summer after the third season of American Idol, then called off.

== Following the show ==
Upon completion of the competition, the American Juniors group consisted of Taylor and Tori Thompson, Chauncey Matthews, Lucy Hale and Danielle White. The group made a brief appearance on the December 2003 TV special An American Idol Christmas. Their debut album American Juniors was released on October 6, 2004. The group disbanded in 2005, after having received relatively little publicity.

Almost 20 years after the TV series, Lucy Hale is now the most widely known contestant from American Juniors, having acted in a number of films and television shows, most notably the series Pretty Little Liars from 2010 to 2017. She returned to her musical roots in 2014, with the release of the country album Road Between on Disney Music Group's "Nashville" label.

Katelyn Tarver released her debut solo album, Wonderful Crazy, in 2005. From 2010 to 2013, she played Jo Taylor in the Nickelodeon TV series Big Time Rush. She has continued to act and release music. In 2019, she appeared on NBC's Songland.

Kristinia DeBarge, although not finalist, managed to have a relatively successful career, releasing her first album entitled Exposed in July 2009, and a couple of albums and singles more, as well as participating as an actress in some television series and movies.

Jordan McCoy was signed to Diddy's label, Bad Boy Records, having only released demos. She was part of the late-2000s revival of the defunct girl group, Dream (also formed by Diddy).

In 2011, Tori and Taylor Thompson resurfaced on NBC's The Voice as a singing duo. They were selected and coached by Cee Lo Green but were voted off in the first live show.

In 2020, American Juniors semifinalist Grace Leer auditioned for season 18 of American Idol. She made it to Hollywood after singing "Crowded Table" by The Highwomen. She eventually was eliminated at the Top 11.
