= Frankie Bridge =

English singer and TV presenter (born 1989)

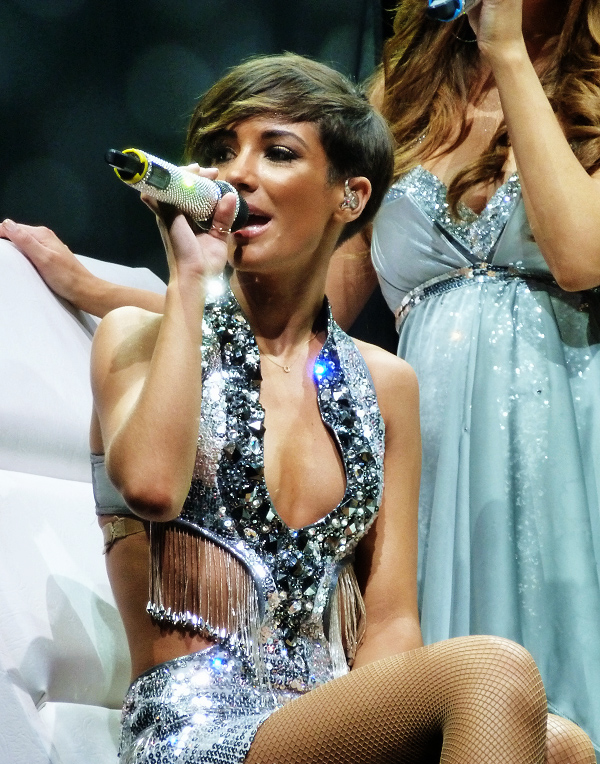
- Bridge performing in 2011
- Born: Francesca Sandford; 14 January 1989 (age 37); Upminster, London, England
- Occupations: Singer; television personality
- Years active: 2001–present
- Spouse: Wayne Bridge (m. 2014)
- Children: 2
- Musical career
- Genres: Pop; R&B; dance; pop rock
- Instrument: Vocals
- Labels: Polydor; Fascination
- Formerly of: S Club 8; The Saturdays

Francesca Bridge (née Sandford, born 14 January 1989) is an English singer and television personality. She was a member of the pop group S Club 8 (originally S Club Juniors) and the girl group The Saturdays.

Bridge began her career at 12 years old, when she auditioned for the reality television competition S Club Search in 2001, winning a place in the group S Club Juniors, later renamed S Club 8. The group were a spin-off of the pop group S Club 7 and they released seven singles and two albums. The group also featured in their own children's musical television programme I Dream (2004), before disbanding in 2005.

In 2007, Bridge successfully auditioned for the girl group The Saturdays. The group immediately signed to Polydor and Fascination Records and later gained a record deal with Geffen Records after having huge success in the United Kingdom. Bridge and the rest of the group later signed a deal with Island Def Jam and Mercury to distribute their music in the United States. The Saturdays have released four albums and achieved numerous UK top-ten singles, including the number-one hit "What About Us". They also starred in their own reality television series The Saturdays: 24/7 (2010) and Chasing the Saturdays (2013).

After The Saturdays disbanded in 2014, Bridge decided to pursue a solo music career, signing a record deal with both Polydor and Fascination Records. Her debut solo album was expected to be released in 2019, however it was shelved so she could focus on motherhood. Bridge gained higher prominence as a style icon, and her signature style short hair started a trend around the UK. Her other television work includes being a contestant on the reality shows Strictly Come Dancing (2014) and I'm a Celebrity...Get Me Out of Here! (2024), presenting the game show Cannonball (2017), and being a panellist on the talk show Loose Women since 2021.

== Early life ==
Bridge was born in Upminster, Greater London, on 14 January 1989. According to Bridge, her parents are very "sporty" and she would hate Sundays owing to their making her do sport, therefore Bridge began taking dance lessons from the age of three at her local Community centre. Bridge auditioned for Colins Performing Arts, a drama school in Romford, and sang a song from Joseph and the Amazing Technicolor Dreamcoat, which she practised daily with the school choir. She was successful in receiving a place at the school. Bridge was inspired to audition for the school after seeing future bandmate Rochelle Humes perform at the opening evening. Bridge began auditioning for roles in television shows and adverts when she was nine years old, and although she did well and often made the final selections, she did not receive any parts she auditioned for and began questioning whether or not she was good enough, and therefore began taking an extra two private acting lessons a week.

In her early teens she won a contest for her performance of "Macavity" from the musical Cats and her mother taught her the song, choreographed the routine and made her outfit. In the book The Saturdays: Our Story, Bridge said she was "very poor" at mathematics in school and her school report revealed she was well behaved as a child and would receive detention for only forgetting homework.

Bridge previously worked in a bar in her local town during the week and had a Saturday job as a sales assistant at an AllSaints concession in House of Fraser, Lakeside Shopping Centre, Essex. From a young age Bridge suffered from severe depression. Bridge studied dance in her after-school hours. and enrolled at a stage school near Romford to study musical arts. Her grandmother would call her "Sunshine and Showers" because of her very upbeat personality when she is happy and very down personality when she is sad. Following the death of her grandmother, Bridge got the words tattooed onto the bottom of her neck.

== Career ==
=== 2001–2005: Beginnings and S Club 8 ===
S Club Juniors were formed in 2001 through a reality television show, S Club Search. The auditions were aired on children's television channel, CBBC. The concept of the show was to find a spin-off S Club 7. The show documents the auditions and formation of the group, with S Club 7 as the judges of the show. The winning individuals of the show would be guaranteed a place in the spin-off group. Although, the group were originally formed to only perform and support S Club 7 at Wembley Arena date of their Carnival Tour, S Club Juniors' appearance was considered a success and consequently 19 Entertainment, the management company that had created S Club 7 and auditioned S Club Juniors, decided they should perform as the support act at all of the venues on the tour. The group made their debut television appearance as a group on Children in Need in November 2001. By the time the group had finished touring with S Club 7, they had earned a substantial following and with the encouragement of 19, Polydor Records signed the group. They released their first single "One Step Closer" in April 2002, the group promoted the single by featuring in a four episode television special S Club Junior: The Story, aired on BBC. The song went head-to-head in a chart battle with the Sugababes' comeback single "Freak like Me". Eventually, the song debuted at number two in the UK, though the group were predicted to chart at number-one in the midweek sales, but dipped over the weekend selling roughly 73,000 copies in the first week, compared to the Sugababes' 85,000 copies. "Automatic High" was released as the second single from the band's first studio album, the single also reached number two in the UK charts selling 52,000 copies, and spent eight weeks inside the UK top 75. The group began working on their debut studio album in June 2002; working with Cathy Dennis, Carole King, Gerry Goffin Tracy Ackerman, Hannah Robinson and Mikkel S. Eriksen (of Stargate). Bridge was the only member of the band to get a solo in every chorus of the song. A third single was released from the album, "New Direction" and again charted at number two in the UK. The Juniors released their debut album Together (2002) on 21 October; it reached number five in its first week of sale and sold 40,000 copies. A fourth single, "Puppy Love/Sleigh Ride", was released in December 2002. The song was also featured in the soundtrack for film Love Actually.

The group announced their first headlining concert tour, S Club United: The Tour; the group would co-headline the tour with original band, S Club 7. Where the group opened their setlist with the song "I Come Alive". It was on tour the band announced they would be changing their name from S Club Juniors to S Club 8, owing to members of the group getting older. On tour the band added two new songs to the setlist of their tour; "Fool No More" and "Sundown". "Fool No More" was revealed as the group's fifth single, released in June 2003, debuting at number four on the UK Singles Chart selling 26,000 copies in the singles first week. "Sundown" was announced as the second single from the album in September 2003 and the track became the band's sixth top-ten single, selling roughly 40,000 copies in its first week. Sundown (2003) was unveiled as the album's title in September and the album was released in early October 2003. Sundown reached number 13 in the UK charts, falling to number 40 in the second week. Despite selling a total of 60,000 copies in the UK and 315,859 worldwide, the record company perceived the album as a failure. A third and final single was released, "Don't Tell Me You're Sorry", which charted at number 11. The group went onto star in children's television show, I Dream for 19 Entertainment; where the group played "exaggerated versions" of themselves. They used their own names to play the characters in the show; Simon Fuller hoped this would increase the audience, seeing the life of S Club 8. Each episode of the show includes several (usually two or more) songs and dance numbers involving both members and non-members of the band. Cast member George Wood called the show "a modern day Fame". During this time, the band recorded the soundtrack to the show Welcome to Avalon Heights. The band split in early 2005, after I Dream ended.

=== 2006–2015: Solo projects, shop work, and The Saturdays ===
After S Club Juniors and I Dream ended in 2005, Bridge continued to be managed by Simon Fuller, who encouraged her to release her own solo material. Bridge claimed Fuller wanted her to be the “next Rachel Stevens.” (Stevens was a member of then-split up S Club 7 who had recently gone solo with her own music). Bridge however couldn’t decide what type of music she wished to release, and stepped away from Fuller’s label. Bridge later recalled feeling out of her depth, and described herself as an Avril Lavigne fan, and her style as a “bit emo”, which was “not the look (Fuller) was going for.” While in America receiving vocal coaching, Bridge recorded demo tracks and was offered a potential record deal from Hollywood Records. However, she turned it down based on advice from her family and management, who suggested she was too young.

Bridge had several jobs after S Club Juniors, including handing out flyers, working at an AllSaints concession stand at House of Fraser, and bar work at The Sugar Hut in Essex. Bridge tried once again to break into the music business in early 2007 as a solo artist, but failed.

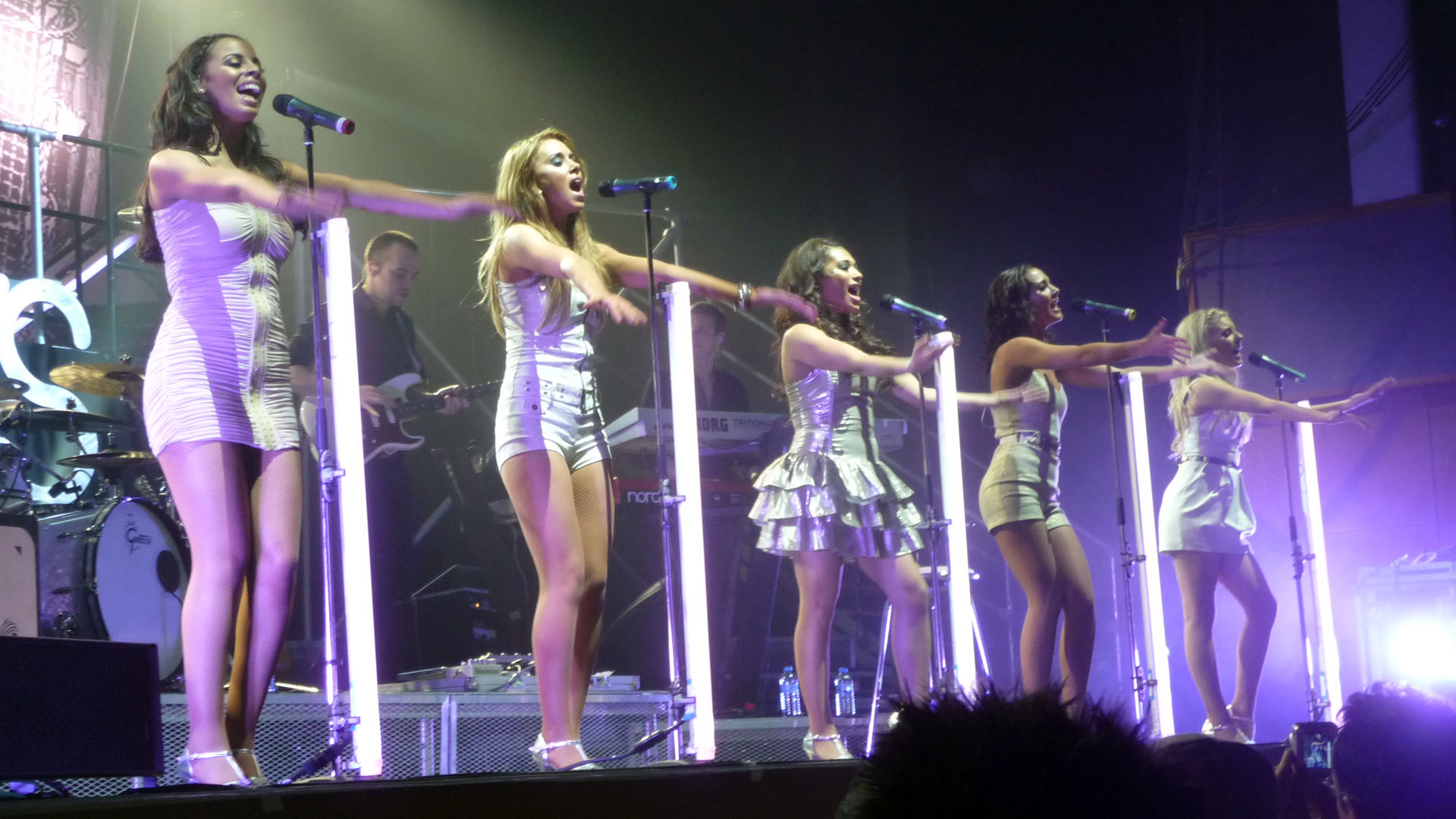
The Saturdays on stage in 2009

In summer 2007, Bridge received a call from executives of a record label, asking her to audition for a new girl group that was being put together. She was initially unsure whether to audition, as she was reluctant to become a member of “another girl band.” After giving it some thought, she agreed to audition. Bridge was successful in auditioning and earned a place in the group along with Vanessa White, Mollie King, Una Healy and former S Club 8 colleague Rochelle Humes.

The group was named The Saturdays. The Saturdays achieved thirteen Top 10 hits, and five Top 10 albums. The Saturdays were formed in June 2007 after auditions were held to find members for the group. The group was put together through the record label Fascination Records, who gave them an instant record deal as well as a sub-division of Polydor Records.

The girl group released their debut single "If This Is Love" in July 2008, and it peaked at number eight in the UK. The group released a second single "Up" which charted at number five in the UK and later the song was given a Silver Disc in the United Kingdom. In late October 2008, the group released their first studio album Chasing Lights. It charted at number nine in the UK, and went platinum according to the BPI. The band released a third single from the album, "Issues", which also went silver. The Saturdays released a cover of "Just Can't Get Enough" by Depeche Mode. The song debuted at number two in the UK, behind Flo Rida's "Right Round". The fifth and final single from the album was "Work", which was the first single by the group to fail to reach the top 20. The group later went on a tour titled The Work Tour. In October 2009, the group released a second studio album, Wordshaker, which charted at number nine and was given a silver certification by the BPI. The first single, "Forever Is Over", charted at number two in the UK. The Saturdays appeared in advertisements for several products including a brand of deodorant, tampons, mobile phones, an operating system, and hair removal products. In early 2010, they released a second and final single from Wordshaker, "Ego", which charted at number nine, the single gained a certification of silver by the BPI.

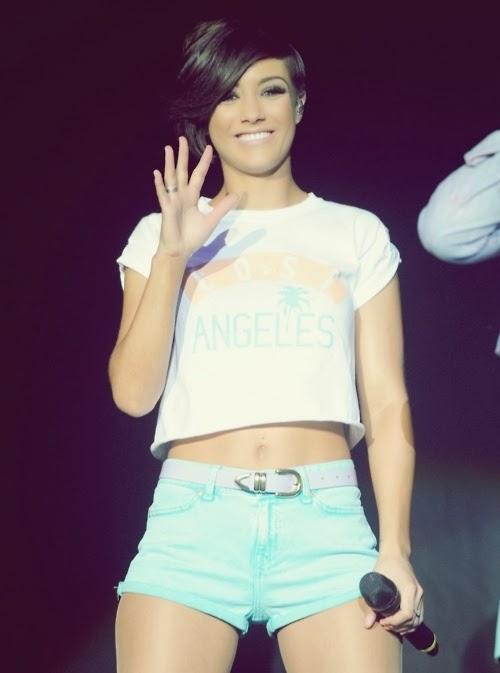
Bridge performing the song "Missing You" during the Headlines Tour in 2011

In Summer 2010, the Saturdays released their first mini album (their third album overall) Headlines!, which charted at number 3 in the UK and number 10 in Ireland. The band released their eighth single, "Missing You", which charted at number three in the UK and number six in Ireland. Rochelle Wiseman confirmed that the second single from the album would be "Higher". It was later confirmed by the band's official website that Flo Rida had recorded vocals for "Higher". On Your Radar was the group's third studio album, reaching a disappointing number 23 in the UK and spending only three weeks in the UK Top 75, but featured the top-ten hits "All Fired Up" and "Notorious", as well as another single, "My Heart Takes Over". In December 2011, the group went on their first headlining arena tour, All Fired Up Tour!. In May 2012, the band released "30 Days", their first single that was to later feature on their fourth studio album; the song peaked at number seven in the UK. Later in the year, they temporarily moved from London to Los Angeles in the hope of breaking America. Helping increase their single sales in America, E! Network broadcast Chasing the Saturdays, a reality TV show following the girls during their three-month stay in America. The show premiered in January 2013, and was cancelled after one series. The band released "What About Us" (featuring rapper Sean Paul) in March 2013, which became their first number one single and was the biggest selling single of the year (at that point). Later on in the year, "Gentleman" and "Disco Love" were released, with both of them charting in the top 15. Their album Living for the Weekend became the band's fourth top ten album. The final single taken from the album was a fan favourite. The radio mix of "Not Giving Up" was released in April 2014 and was their seventeenth top 40 single. The band went on hiatus in 2014, and released a greatest hits album, Finest Selection: The Greatest Hits, the same year. The only single released from the album, "What Are You Waiting For?", charted at number 37, making it their lowest-charting single to date.

=== 2016–present: Documentaries, shelved album and writing ===
Bridge became the ambassador for the mental health charity Mind in 2016. Later in the year, Bridge also became the ambassador for Marie Curie. Bridge designed a range of cosmetics to raise money and awareness for the charity. It was announced that her cosmetics line would be sold through Superdrug. Bridge managed to raise £430,000, the equivalent to nearly 21,500 hours of nursing care by Marie Curie. In 2016, Bridge signed a deal with Channel 5 Documentaries to present a number of different documentaries in the UK. Bridge presented the Channel 5 shows Celebrity Trolls: We're Coming to Get You and Celebrity Trolls with Frankie Bridge in 2017. Bridge and her team of investigators track down people who sent abusive messages to celebrities online, including Nicola McLean and Sam Bailey. The documentary saw Bridge track down the trolls and confront them about the messages they have been sending. Bridge also met with a family who were sent distressing messages after their son went missing. Bridge decided to do the show after she received death threats through social media after splitting up with previous partner Dougie Poynter. In September 2017, Bridge took part in television show Married to a Celebrity, where she appeared with her husband Wayne Bridge.

Bridge's first attempt at a solo career was in 2004, when she released a duet with Calvin Goldspink with the song "Dreaming" which was a moderate hit in the UK. Bridge then featured on Kids in Glass Houses' second studio album, Dirt (2010) on the track "Undercover Lover". Bridge revealed the songs that she had previously recorded and co-wrote, "Swallow" and "Bored" would be re-recorded for the album. It was revealed that she would be collaborating with the Saturdays long-time producer Steve Mac. It is speculated that Bridge would work with Flo Rida after he revealed he would like to work with Bridge as a solo artist after their collaboration on "Higher". In September 2017, Bridge became a co-presenter on ITV gameshow Cannonball along with Freddie Flintoff, Maya Jama, Ryan Hand and Radzi Chinyanganya, filming in Valletta, Malta. It was announced that Bridge would remained signed to Polydor and Fascination Records for her debut solo album, the labels she has been signed to from eleven-years-old. Bridge plans to record pop-dance album, taking influences from Rihanna, Taylor Swift and Rita Ora. Producer Marshmello announced he was working with Bridge in the studio. Bridge revealed her debut solo album had been shelved to focus on motherhood and writing.

== Other endeavours ==
=== Television appearances ===
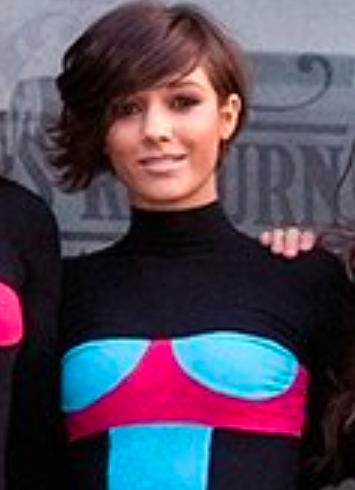
Bridge at the Real Radio launch

On 22 September 2004, I Dream, a children's musical television comedy programme aimed at and about teenagers, was broadcast. Set at a performing arts college near Barcelona, Spain, the programme focused on thirteen teens, including Bridge, invited to enroll at Avalon Heightsover the summer. Hollywood actor Christopher Lloyd also starred in the show. The programme was created by Simon Fuller who is responsible for the Idol series. In late 2008, Bridge appeared in late-night teen soap Hollyoaks Later, where she was credited as herself. The Saturdays were given their own reality TV series The Saturdays: 24/7, which followed the band during their day-to-day life promoting their new album [at the time] Headlines!. The programme was sponsored by watchmakers Sekonda. The programme also featured exclusive performances by Bridge and her bandmates.

In November 2008, along with the Saturdays, Bridge appeared in the Channel 4 Hollyoaks spin-off Hollyoaks Later. They performed the song "Issues" in the 10-minute BBC drama Myths in January 2009, in the episode "A Syren's Call". Commenting on rumours about tension in the Saturdays, Bridge said, "You always see in the papers, that me and girls are always arguing, we really don't and there is no bitching at all." In the first episode of The Saturdays: 24/7 the band were shown gigging around the UK, without King, after she was taken ill after being bitten by a horse-fly and Bridge had to learn new lines of their song "If This Is Love" after she stated she didn't know all the song's lines. On 8 November 2010, Bridge took part in the paranormal television programme Ghosthunting with..., where she appeared with her bandmates. On the programme, the band investigated purported paranormal activity accompanied by host Yvette Fielding, who took them to visit three locations within the Welsh mountains: the clock tower, the manor and the kitchen block. In each of these areas, there have been countless reports of strange phenomena including the sounds of chatter coming from empty rooms, cooking smells coming from an empty kitchen, and reported ghostly sightings. During the time in the first location, Bridge said that she could smell someone cooking, although no one was in the kitchen. She also experienced a ghost throwing marbles at her, when there was no one there. When she was about to leave the haunted location the spirit of the little girl apparently threw marbles at them. In 2010, Bridge appeared in ITV reality series The Door where she had to pass through a series of doors and take on a number of tough challenges. The last star standing claims a cash prize for their chosen charity. Bridge was the first celebrity to be eliminated from the show after she could not put her hand in a bowl of spiders to get the key to the door to pass through to the next level. Bridge commented, "It's funny because I know when I watch it that I'll look like I hate every second of it but I absolutely loved it. I wanted it to keep going." Bridge was in talks to become a judge on The X Factor after Cheryl Cole left the panel following the 2011 series. She was later judged not to have a "high enough profile". Bridge also declined to appear on rival BBC talent show The Voice UK owing to her "busy schedule". On 13 August 2014, Bridge announced on BBC Breakfast that she would be competing in the twelfth series of Strictly Come Dancing that would begin in September 2014. Her dance partner was Kevin Clifton. Bridge and Clifton placed runner-up in the final, along with Simon Webbe and Kristina Rihanoff. She became a co-presenter on ITV game show Cannonball alongside Freddie Flintoff, Maya Jama, Ryan Hand and Radzi Chinyanganya in September 2017. In January 2018, Frankie participated in And They're Off! in aid of Sport Relief. On 10 December 2020, Bridge appeared as a guest panellist on the popular ITV daytime show Loose Women. Frankie was confirmed to be a full-time panellist on 9 February 2021. In 2021, Bridge was announced as a contestant on the twenty-first series of I'm a Celebrity...Get Me Out of Here!. She reached the final and finished in third place.

=== Merchandise and sponsorship deals ===
Bridge contributed to the book The Saturdays: Our Story, an autobiography of the Saturdays that was released on 25 October 2010. The book was written by a ghostwriter and published by the Transworld imprint Bantam Press. Bridge and her band also began a book signing on at WHSmith in Bluewater. The book gives an insight into Bridge's life, where she explains her success with the Saturdays as well as her ex-band S Club 8. She talks about her love life, her friendships within the band and personal insight into her life before finding fame. Bridge also gives fashion and beauty tips throughout the book and gossip accompanied by photos from her own collection.

As a member of the Saturdays, Bridge became the new face of hair removal product, Veet. In the photoshoot to promote Veet's new collection, the band models a range of micro miniskirts and body con dresses to show off their hair-free legs. They also later became the new faces of Impulse women's deodorant. The band recorded a television ad dubbed the Impulse Diaries. The TV content, which involves a sponsorship package on Channel 4, will show the girls in various settings including a hotel room, a tour bus and backstage before a gig. This first aired on 23 October. The Saturdays also became the face of Nintendo 3DS game, Nintendogs + Cats, for which the band recorded a number of TV adverts to promote.

=== Acting career ===
Bridge made her West End debut in August 2023, joining the cast of Danny Robins' play 2:22 A Ghost Story at the Apollo Theatre; she took over the role of Lauren from Sophia Bush and performed in the production until its close on 17 September 2023.

=== Podcast ===
Bridge and Cici Coleman present First Dates: The Podcast.

== Artistry ==
=== Musical style ===
Bridge gained a record deal in 2002 with S Club Juniors and the band released their debut single, "One Step Closer", in which she sings the solo parts in every chorus and backing vocals in the end of the song. All of the band's songs were pop-based music. After the band split up, she remained signed to Polydor Records and uploaded a R&B song titled "Bored" onto MySpace. She later uploaded another track titled "Swallow" which was a pop rock song. She later became a member of the Saturdays and recorded a song titled "If This Is Love", featuring elements of synthpop and new wave. Bridge's style has also been described by music critics as "obligatory fluffy summery pop", "pure uplifting pop", "an 80's throwback" and "an electro-soul number". In 2010, she went on to release another solo song with Kids in Glass Houses called "Undercover Love", which was released from their 2010 album Dirt. She later released a new song with the Saturdays, "Missing You" and then "Higher" where the band have made use of auto-tuning on their vocals. The production of "Higher" was described as "hectic". Many artists have expressed views in collaborating with Bridge including Bruno Mars and Flo Rida, who stated that he would like to work with her as a solo act.

== Personal life ==
=== Relationships and children ===
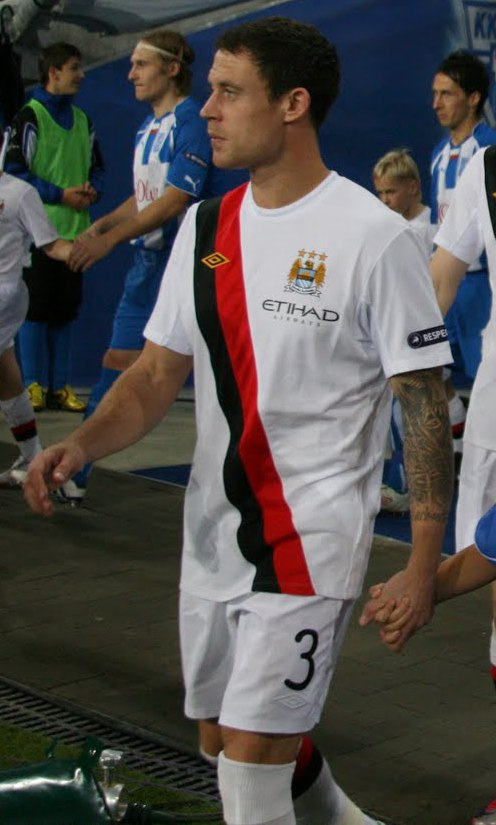
Bridge's husband Wayne, pictured in 2010

Bridge dated McFly member Dougie Poynter from 2008 to 2010. Bridge began a relationship with footballer Wayne Bridge in late 2011. They married in a private ceremony at Woburn Abbey in Woburn, Bedfordshire, on 19 July 2014 and have two sons. She lives in Cobham, Surrey.

=== Mental health ===
In 2011, Bridge had to take time out of her work commitments with the Saturdays owing to an "illness". It was later revealed that Bridge had been hospitalised owing to depression. She announced once in rehab she thought the other patients would judge her because she was "rich" and well off. The media reported that Bridge was checked into a rehabilitation centre owing to stress after a punishing work schedule. However, she quickly denied the rumours. She came out and spoke about her battle with depression after people began to believe she was admitted owing to alcohol and drugs. Bridge was praised for coming out and speaking about her battle with depression and this led to Bridge becoming the ambassador for charity Mind.

== Discography ==
- Together (2002)
- Sundown (2003)
- Welcome to Avalon Heights (2004)
- Chasing Lights (2008)
- Wordshaker (2009)
- Headlines! (2010)
- On Your Radar (2011)
- Living for the Weekend (2013)

=== As featured artist ===
Year	Single	Peak positions	Album
Year	Single	UK	Album
2010	"Undercover Lover" (Kids in Glass Houses featuring Frankie Sandford)	62	Dirt

== Tours ==
=== With the Saturdays ===
1. The Work Tour (2009)
2. The Headlines Tour (2011)
3. All Fired Up! Tour (2011)
4. Greatest Hits Live! (2014)

=== As solo supporting act ===
1. The Dirt Tour (with Kids in Glass Houses; selected dates in 2010)
2. Strictly Come Dancing – Live Tour (2016)

== Awards and nominations ==
Year	Award	Category	Result
2011	Glamour Awards	Best Dressed	Won
2014	Inspiration Awards For Women	Next Generation	Won

== Filmography ==
Year	Title	Role	Notes
2001	S Club Search	Herself	TV series
2002	Viva S Club	Fan	
2002	Smash Hits Poll Winners Party 2002	Herself	With S Club Juniors
2002–03	Top of the Pops	Herself	Five performances with S Club Juniors
2004	Smile	Herself	
2004	Ministry of Mayhem	Herself	
2004	Top of the Pops Saturday	Herself	One performance with S Club Juniors
2004	I Dream	Frankie	
2008	Hollyoaks Later	Herself	Series 1, Episode 3
2008	Never Mind the Buzzcocks	Guest	TV series (Episode 22.2)
2008	Big Brother's Little Brother	Herself	
2009	Myths	Syren	
2009	The Xtra Factor	Guest	
2009	Ant & Dec's Saturday Night Takeaway	Guest	
2009	Something for the Weekend	Guest	
2010	Impulse into Glamour Presents: A Diary of the Saturdays T4 Special	Herself	
2010	The Door	Participant	ITV reality game show
2013	Chasing the Saturdays	Herself	TV series
2014	Strictly Come Dancing	Participant	BBC One celebrity ballroom dancing series
2017	Celeb Trolls: We're Coming to Get You	Presenter	Channel 5 documentary series
2017	Cannonball	Co-presenter	ITV entertainment series
2021—present	Loose Women	Regular panellist	ITV lunchtime chat show
2021	I'm a Celebrity...Get Me Out of Here!	Contestant	Series 21

== See also ==
- List of I'm a Celebrity...Get Me Out of Here! (British TV series) contestants
- List of Strictly Come Dancing contestants
