= Don't Tell Me You're Sorry =

Single by S Club 8

from the album Sundown
- B-side: "Sloop Upside"; "Big Fun"
- Released: 29 December 2003
- Label: Polydor; 19
- Songwriters: Lisa Greene; Henrik Korpi; Henrik Janson; Mathias Johansson
- Producer: Korpi & Blackcell

S Club 8 singles chronology
"Sundown" (2003)	"Don't Tell Me You're Sorry" (2003)	"Dreaming" (2004)

Frankie Sandford singles chronology
"Sundown" (2003)	"Don't Tell Me You're Sorry" (2003)	"Dreaming" (2004)

"Don't Tell Me You're Sorry" is a song by British pop group S Club 8, released as the third and final single from their second album, Sundown (2003). It was released on 29 December 2003 and was the group's last release under the S Club name. The song peaked at number 11 on the UK Singles Chart, their first single to miss the top 10 in the country. The song was given a new mix for release, the single release having a 1970s club vibe where the album version included more of an R&B influence.

== Composition ==
Stacey McClean sings the first verse, a backing vocal in the second verse, leads every chorus, and sings the fourth verse along with Aaron. Rochelle Wiseman sings the second verse. Aaron Renfree leads the first and second bridges along with Calvin and Jay, and sings the fourth verse along with Stacey. Frankie Sandford sings the third verse. Daisy Evans sings backing vocals in the third verse along with Hannah. Hannah Richings sings backing vocals in the third verse along with Daisy. Jay Asforis leads the first part of the song's main bridge along with Calvin and Aaron, and sings the backing vocals of the third part of this bridge and in the final chorus. Calvin Goldspink leads the second part of the song's main bridge along with Aaron and Jay.

== Music video ==
The video, released in 2004, was the group's last. It takes place on a black stage with various effects added in post-production. The video features the group's members performing the song on stage, as well as in "club" scenes in smaller groups.

== Track listings ==
UK CD1

1. "Don't Tell Me You're Sorry" (single mix)
2. "Sloop Upside"

UK CD2

1. "Don't Tell Me You're Sorry"
2. "Big Fun"
3. "One Step Closer" (Jewels & Stone extended party mix)
4. "Don't Tell Me You're Sorry" (Europa XL vocal mix)
5. "Don't Tell Me You're Sorry" (video)

== Charts ==
Chart (2004)	Peak position
Ireland (IRMA)	25
Scottish Singles Sales (Official Charts)	11
UK Singles (Official Charts)	11
