= Heart of England =

Heart of England may refer to:

- English Midlands
- Heart of England School
- Heart of England Co-operative Society
- Heart of England NHS Foundation Trust
- Heart of England Way
- Heart of England, a region in the Britain in Bloom horticultural competition
