= New Direction (song) =

2002 single by S Club Juniors

Single by S Club Juniors

from the album Together
- B-side: "One Step Closer"
- Released: 7 October 2002
- Length: 4:17
- Label: Polydor, 19
- Songwriters: Georgie Dennis, Ricky Hanley, Gary White, Didier Marouani (Magic Fly mix)
- Producers: Jewels & Stone, Gary White

S Club Juniors singles chronology
"Automatic High" (2002)	"New Direction" (2002)	"Puppy Love" / "Sleigh Ride" (2002)

Frankie Sandford singles chronology
"Automatic High" (2002)	"New Direction" (2002)	"Puppy Love" / "Sleigh Ride" (2002)

"New Direction" is a song by British pop group S Club Juniors, released as the third single from their debut album, Together (2002). Released on 7 October 2002, the song reached number two on the UK Singles Chart, being their third consecutive release to do so. For radio airplay, the song was remixed as the "Magic Fly" mix, which samples the song "Magic Fly" by Space.

== Composition ==
Frankie Sandford sings the first and third verses, backing vocals in the second and fourth verses, the song's bridges along with Stacey, the solo's vocals in the song main bridge along with Stacey, a vocal during this bridge, and backing vocals during the end of the song. Stacey McClean sings backing vocals in the first and third verses, the second and fourth verses, the song's bridges along with Frankie, the solo's vocals in the song main bridge along with Frankie, a vocal during this bridge, and backing vocals during the end of the song. Calvin Goldspink, Aaron Renfree, Rochelle Wiseman, Daisy Evans, Hannah Richings, and Jay Asforis do not have any solos in this song.

== Track listings ==
UK CD1

1. "New Direction"
2. "New Direction" (Magic Fly mix)
3. "New Direction" (illicit mix)
4. "New Direction" (video)

UK CD2 and cassette single

1. "New Direction"
2. "One Step Closer" (Almighty Jelly & Cream mix)
3. "New Direction" (karaoke version)

== Credits and personnel ==
Credits are lifted from the Together album booklet.

Studio

- Mastered at Transfermation (London, England)

Personnel

- Georgie Dennis – writing
- Ricky Hanley – writing
- Gary White – writing, production
- Didier Marouani – writing (Magic Fly mix)
- Jewels & Stone – production, additional production and remix (Magic Fly mix)
- Tim "Speg" Speight – mixing
- Richard Dowling – mastering

== Charts ==
=== Weekly charts ===
Chart (2002)	Peak position
Europe (Eurochart Hot 100)	12
Ireland (IRMA)	7
Scottish Singles Sales (Official Charts)	2
UK Singles (Official Charts)	2

=== Year-end charts ===
Chart (2002)	Position
UK Singles (OCC)	101
