= Lorna Want =

British theatre actress (born 1987)

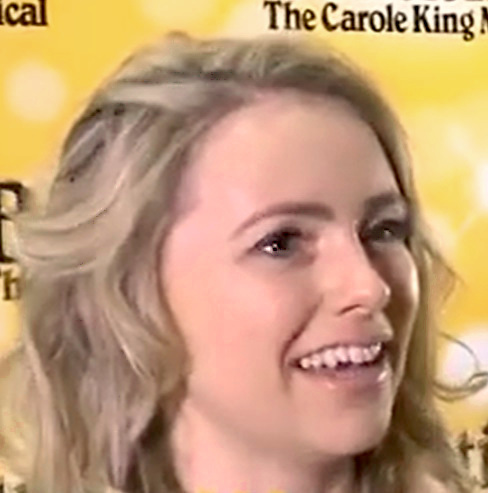
- Want in 2015
- Born: Lorna Rosanna Want; 28 June 1987 (age 39); Solihull, England
- Occupation: Actress
- Years active: 2001–present
- Father: Tony Want
- Awards: Olivier Award (2015)

Lorna Rosanna Want (born 28 June 1987) is an English theatre actress best known for her work on London's West End. She won a Laurence Olivier Award for Best Actress in a Supporting Role in a Musical for her performance in Beautiful: The Carole King Musical.

== Early life and education ==
Want is from Solihull, West Midlands and the daughter of former footballer Tony Want. She attended Heart of England School and joined the Birmingham Television Workshop at age 12. After finishing her GCSEs, Want moved to London with her parents for her career.

== Career ==
Want auditioned for S Club 8 (then S Club Juniors) in 2001, and got to the final 14. However, she was not chosen due to being almost fifteen, and was deemed too old for the band’s 11-14 intended age range. Simon Fuller recognised her talent during the auditions, and signed her to his management company, 19 Entertainment.

Want made her West End debut at the age of 15, playing Juliet in a new musical version of Romeo and Juliet, at the Piccadilly Theatre. Her other West End work includes Ariel Moore in Footloose (Novello Theatre Original Cast), Mistress in Andrew Lloyd Webber's new revival of Evita (Adelphi), Monteen in Parade (Donmar Warehouse), Luisa in The Fantasticks (Duchess), Laura in Dreamboats and Petticoats (Playhouse 2010), and Cynthia Weil in Beautiful: The Carole King Musical (Aldwych), for which she won the Olivier Award for best supporting actress in 2015. She played Flic in the one-woman musical Girl in a Crisis, which made its debut performance at London's Crazy Coqs, Live at Zedel. She also appeared in the I Dream comedy series, along with S Club 8, where she played Natalie.

Want's regional and touring work includes: Young Cosette in Les Misérables (Birmingham Hippodrome 1997), Ariel Moore in Footloose" (UK Tours 2006 and 2011), Gabriella in the original British cast of High School Musical" (UK Tour 2008), the title role in Sleeping Beauty (Bromley Churchill 2009/10), Wendy in Peter Pan (Woking New Victoria 2011 and Manchester Opera House 2012), Hope Harcourt in Anything Goes (Kilworth House Theatre 2013), Maid Marian in Robin Hood (Cambridge Arts Theatre), and Winnie Tate in Annie Get Your Gun (UK Tour 2014). Princess Anne in Roman Holiday (Shanghai 2018) Mina in Dracapella (Park Theatre 2025/2026)

She appeared in an episode of Casualty on 15 September 2007, and an episode of Doctors in 2012.

== Awards and nominations ==
| Year | Award | Category | Work | Result |
|---|---|---|---|---|
| 2015 | Laurence Olivier Award | Best Actress in a Supporting Role in a Musical | Beautiful | Won |
