= Fool No More =

2003 single by S Club 8

Single by S Club 8

from the album Sundown
- B-side: "S Club Party"; "Rush"
- Released: 30 June 2003
- Length: 3:28
- Label: Polydor
- Songwriters: Ian Curnow; Georgie Dennis; Ricky Hanley; Darren Woodford
- Producers: Jewels & Stone

S Club 8 singles chronology
"Puppy Love" / "Sleigh Ride" (2002)	"Fool No More" (2003)	"Sundown" (2003)

Frankie Sandford singles chronology
"Puppy Love" / "Sleigh Ride" (2002)	"Fool No More" (2003)	"Sundown" (2003)

Music video
- "Fool No More" on YouTube

"Fool No More" is a song by British pop music group S Club 8 released as the first single from their second album, Sundown (2003). Released on 30 June 2003, it reached number four on the UK Singles Chart and number 20 on the Irish Singles Chart.

== Composition ==
Frankie Sandford sings the song's intro, the first verse, the bridge at the end of every chorus, the fourth verse, the main bridge of the song, and backing vocals during the final chorus and the end of the song. Rochelle Wiseman sings the second and third verses, and backing vocals during the final chorus and the end of the song. Calvin Goldspink, Aaron Renfree, Stacey McClean, Daisy Evans, Hannah Richings and Jay Asforis do not have any solos in this song.

== Music video ==
The video, filmed at Clarence Pier in Portsmouth, starts off with the group having a little fun on a beach, once the song begins they come to a locked up amusement park they shake the gates that keep the park closed, however the lock has the "S Club" Emblem on it, is opened and the group then open the gates and enter the park itself. During the video the group are dancing in the middle of bumper cars, shots of them roaming around the park and going on the rides themselves such as the carousel and the roller-coaster. By the end of the video the night draws in, after the group's day in the amusements ends they head their way back out of the amusement park all light up in the night as they close off the gates placing the lock back into place as the camera zooms into the "S Club" Lock.

== Track listings ==
UK CD1

1. "Fool No More"
2. "S Club Party" (S Club 8 and S Club United!)
3. "Rush"
4. "Fool No More" (video)

UK CD2

1. "Fool No More"
2. "Fool No More" (karaoke version)
3. "One Step Closer"
4. Enhanced section

UK cassette single

1. "Fool No More"
2. "Fool No More" (Almighty mix)

== Credits and personnel ==
Credits are lifted from the UK CD1 liner notes.

Studio

- Mastered at Transfermation (London, England)

Personnel

- Ian Curnow – writing
- Georgie Dennis – writing
- Ricky Hanley – writing
- Darren Woodford – writing
- Pete Davis – keyboards
- Jewels & Stone – production
- Tim "Spag" Speight – mixing
- Richard Dowling – mastering

== Charts ==
=== Weekly charts ===
Chart (2003)	Peak position
Europe (Eurochart Hot 100)	13
Ireland (IRMA)	20
Scottish Singles Sales (Official Charts)	5
UK Singles (Official Charts)	4

=== Year-end charts ===
Chart (2003)	Position
UK Singles (OCC)	145
