= Welcome to Avalon Heights =

Soundtrack album by S Club 8
- Released: November 29, 2004
- Recorded: United Kingdom
- Genre: Pop
- Label: Polydor

S Club 8 chronology
Sundown (2003)	Welcome to Avalon Heights (2004)

Welcome to Avalon Heights is a soundtrack album released by S Club 8 and the cast of British children's musical television comedy I Dream.

== Album information ==
The lead vocals are mostly from Matt Di Angelo, Calvin Goldspink, Rachel Hyde-Harvey, Helen Kurup, Frankie Sandford, Lorna Want and George Wood. Many of S Club 8's fans believed this to be unfair to the other members of the group, as they had all, save Hannah, contributed vocals to songs during the course of the series.

The show's theme song, "Dreaming" features on the album, and was the first single to be released off the album.

The songs "Welcome to Avalon Heights" and "Waste Your Time on Me" were also performed on various BBC shows as part of promoting the album. Released on 29 November 2004, it failed to make the top 100 albums chart in the UK managing to peak at 133.

== Track listing ==
1. "Welcome to Avalon Heights"
2. "Dreaming"
3. "Beautiful Thing"
4. "Open Up My Heart"
5. "Our Life"
6. "Waste Your Time on Me"
7. "Goodbye Radio"
8. "Sunshine"
9. "Back Off"
10. "Can I Trust You"
11. "Don't Steal Our Sunshine"
12. "Say It's Alright"
13. "I Want You Around"
14. "I Dream"
15. "Been There" (unlocked on idreamofficial.com via the CD)
16. "Here Comes Summer" (unlocked on idreamofficial.com via the CD)
