= Automatic High =

2002 single by S Club Juniors

Single by S Club Juniors

from the album Together
- B-side: "Anytime Anywhere", "We Got You"
- Released: 22 July 2002
- Length: 3:06
- Label: Polydor, 19
- Songwriters: Jewels & Stone, Terry Ronald, Nina Madhoo
- Producers: Jewels & Stone

S Club Juniors singles chronology
| "One Step Closer" (2002) | "Automatic High" (2002) | "New Direction" (2002) |

Frankie Sandford singles chronology
| "One Step Closer" (2002) | "Automatic High" (2002) | "New Direction" (2002) |

"Automatic High" is a song by British pop group S Club Juniors, released as the second single from their debut album, Together (2002). Released on 22 July 2002, the song peaked at number two on the UK Singles Chart, becoming their second single to reach the position.

== Composition ==
Stacey McClean sings the first verse, the second part of the third verse, part of the song's bridge and backing vocals in the end of the song. Daisy Evans sings the second verse and part of the song's bridge. Frankie Sandford sings the solo's parts in every chorus and backing vocals in the end of the song. Rochelle Wiseman sings the first part of the third verse. Calvin Goldspink, Aaron Renfree, Hannah Richings and Jay Asforis do not have any solos in this song.

== Track listings ==
UK CD1

1. "Automatic High"
2. "Anytime Anywhere"
3. "Anytime Anywhere" (S Club 7 version)
4. "Automatic High" (video)

UK CD2

1. "Automatic High"
2. "Automatic High" (karaoke version)
3. "We Got You"

UK cassette single

1. "Automatic High"
2. "Anytime Anywhere"
3. "Anytime Anywhere" (S Club 7 version)

== Credits and personnel ==
Credits are lifted from the Together album booklet.

Studio

- Mastered at Transfermation (London, England)

Personnel

- Jewels & Stone – writing, production, vocal production and arrangement
- Terry Ronald – writing, vocal production and arrangement
- Nina Madhoo – writing
- James Nisbet – guitar
- Richard Dowling – mastering

== Charts ==
=== Weekly charts ===
| Chart (2002) | Peak position |
|---|---|
| Europe (Eurochart Hot 100) | 14 |
| Ireland (IRMA) | 8 |
| Scottish Singles Sales (Official Charts) | 2 |
| UK Singles (Official Charts) | 2 |

=== Year-end charts ===
| Chart (2002) | Position |
|---|---|
| Ireland (IRMA) | 68 |
| UK Singles (OCC) | 48 |

== Certifications ==
| Region | Certification | Certified units/sales |
|---|---|---|
| United Kingdom (BPI) | Silver | 200,000^{‡} |
^{‡} Sales+streaming figures based on certification alone.
