= Puppy Love (Paul Anka song) =

1960 single by Paul Anka

Single by Paul Anka

from the album Paul Anka Sings His Big 15
- B-side: "Adam & Eve"
- Released: February 13, 1960
- Recorded: 1960
- Genre: Pop
- Length: 2:45
- Label: ABC-Paramount
- Songwriter: Paul Anka
- Producer: Sid Feller

Paul Anka singles chronology
"It's Time to Cry" (1959)	"Puppy Love" (1960)	"My Home Town" (1960)

"Puppy Love" is a popular song written by Canadian-American singer Paul Anka in 1960 for Annette Funicello, a Mouseketeer, on whom he had a crush. Anka's version reached No. 2 on the Billboard Hot 100 behind Percy Faith's "Theme from A Summer Place", No. 4 on the Canadian CHUM Charts, and No. 33 on the UK Singles Chart.

== Donny Osmond version ==
"Puppy Love"

Single by Donny Osmond

from the album Portrait of Donny
- B-side: "Let My People Go"
- Released: February 19, 1972
- Recorded: September 20, 1971
- Genre: Pop
- Length: 3:05
- Songwriter: Paul Anka
- Producers: Mike Curb; Don Costa

Donny Osmond singles chronology
"Hey Girl" (1971)	"Puppy Love" (1972)	"Too Young" (1972)

Twelve years later, the song was revived by Donny Osmond. It was released on February 19, 1972, and reached No. 3 on the Billboard Hot 100 on April 1, 1972. It peaked at No. 1 on both the Canadian RPM singles chart during April 15–29, 1972, and the UK Singles Chart during July 8 – August 5, 1972. Billboard ranked this version as the No. 67 song for 1972. It was certified Gold by the RIAA on March 24, 1972. It also topped the Mexican charts in 1972.

On March 15, 1972, DJ Robert W. Morgan played the Donny Osmond version for 90 minutes straight on KHJ in Los Angeles. After receiving numerous calls from listeners, LAPD raided the station studios. The officers left without making arrests.

Osmond grew to loathe the record and by the early 1980s had begun openly mocking the song in his concerts. His contemporary performances of the song have been more earnest, albeit with some reluctance and mainly only as fan service.

=== Charts ===
==== Weekly charts ====
Chart (1972)	Peak position
Australian (Kent Music Report)	1
Canada RPM Top Singles	1
Ireland (IRMA)	2
Mexico (Billboard Hits of the World)	1
New Zealand (Listener)	1
South Africa (Springbok)	11
UK Singles (Official Charts)	1
US Billboard Hot 100	3
US Cash Box Top 100	3

==== Year-end charts ====
Chart (1972)	Rank
Australia (Kent Music Report)	1
Canada Top Singles (RPM)	6
UK	3
US Billboard Hot 100	67
US Cash Box	47

==== Certifications ====
Country	Certification	Sales
United States	Gold	1,000,000

== S Club Juniors version ==
"Puppy Love" / "Sleigh Ride"

Single by S Club Juniors

from the album Together
- Released: December 9, 2002
- Length: 3:05 ("Puppy Love"); 2:55 ("Sleigh Ride")
- Label: Polydor; 19
- Songwriters: Paul Anka ("Puppy Love"); Leroy Anderson; Mitchell Parish ("Sleigh Ride")
- Producers: Jewels & Stone

S Club Juniors singles chronology
"New Direction" (2002)	"Puppy Love" / "Sleigh Ride" (2002)	"Fool No More" (2003)

In 2002, British pop group S Club Juniors covered "Puppy Love" and released it as a double A-side single alongside a cover of "Sleigh Ride", the 1948 song written by Leroy Anderson and Mitchell Parish. "Puppy Love" / "Sleigh Ride" was released on December 9, 2002, as the fourth single from the group's debut album, Together (2002). It peaked at number six on the UK Singles Chart.

=== Composition ===
Calvin Goldspink sang lead vocals for "Puppy Love". The other members, Frankie Sandford, Aaron Renfree, Stacey McClean, Rochelle Wiseman, Daisy Evans, Hannah Richings and Jay Asforis had backing vocals.

=== Music videos ===
The video for "Puppy Love" features Goldspink looking through a Rachel Stevens calendar and making a snow statue shaped like her whilst the others are playing in the snow. Later the group are indoors decorating the house with decorations before finding their presents where Goldspink finds a present for him from Stevens: a puppy. At the end of the video, words come up saying: "Remember a dog is for life, not just for Christmas".

The video for "Sleigh Ride" features clips from the previous video with the group playing in the snow and the lyrics to song appear to sing-a-long to.

=== Track listings ===
UK CD single

1. "Puppy Love"
2. "Sleigh Ride"
3. "Sleigh Ride" (karaoke version)
4. "Puppy Love" (video)

UK cassette single

1. "Puppy Love"
2. "Sleigh Ride"
3. "Puppy Love" (karaoke version)

=== Credits and personnel ===
==== "Puppy Love" ====
Credits are lifted from the Together album booklet.

Studio

- Mastered at Transfermation (London, England)

Personnel

- Paul Anka – writing
- Paul Gendler – guitars
- Nick Ingman – string and brass arrangement
- Isobel Griffiths Ltd. – string contracting
- Jewels & Stone – production
- Tim "Spag" Speight – mixing
- Richard Dowling – mastering

==== "Sleigh Ride" ====
Credits are lifted from the UK CD single liner notes.

Studio

- Mastered at Transfermation (London, England)

Personnel

- Leroy Anderson – writing
- Mitchell Parish – writing
- James Nisbet – guitars
- Nick Ingman – string and brass arrangement
- Isobel Griffiths Ltd. – string contracting
- Jewels & Stone – production
- Tim "Spag" Speight – mixing
- Richard Dowling – mastering

=== Charts ===
Chart (2002)	Peak position
Europe (Eurochart Hot 100)	16
Ireland (IRMA)	8
Scottish Singles Sales (Official Charts)	7
UK Singles (Official Charts)	6

== See also ==
- List of number-one hits of 1972 (Mexico)
