= Sundown (S Club 8 song) =

2003 single by S Club 8

Single by S Club 8

from the album Sundown
- B-side: "The Day You Came"; "Don't Stop Movin' 'til Sundown"; "Wherever Your Heart Beats"
- Released: 29 September 2003
- Studio: RedFly (Sweden); Strongroom (London, England)
- Length: 4:06
- Label: Polydor
- Songwriters: Niclas Molinder; Joacim Persson; Pelle Ankarberg; Andreas Mattsson
- Producer: Twin

S Club 8 singles chronology
| "Fool No More" (2003) | "Sundown" (2003) | "Don't Tell Me You're Sorry" (2003) |

Frankie Sandford singles chronology
| "Fool No More" (2003) | "Sundown" (2003) | "Don't Tell Me You're Sorry" (2003) |

"Sundown" is a song by British pop group S Club 8, released as the second single and title track from their album of the same name Sundown. Released on 29 September 2003, the single peaked at number four on the UK Singles Chart.

== Song information ==
Calvin Goldspink sings backing vocals in the song's intro, a line and backing vocals in the first part of the bridge, a line in the second part of the bridge along with Stacey, and backing vocals in the final chorus. Stacey McClean sings the first and third verses, backing vocals in the second and final chorus, the second part of the bridge including a line along with Calvin, and backing vocals in the end of the song. Frankie Sandford sings the second and fourth verses, and backing vocals in the second chorus. Aaron Renfree, Rochelle Wiseman, Daisy Evans, Hannah Richings and Jay Asforis do not have any vocal lines in this song.

== Track listings ==
UK CD1

1. "Sundown"
2. "The Day You Came"
3. "Don't Stop Moving 'til Sundown" (Bimbo Jones Bootie remix)
4. "Sundown" (video)

UK CD2

1. "Sundown"
2. "Wherever Your Heart Beats"
3. "Sundown" (Almighty mix)

UK cassette single

1. "Sundown"
2. "The Day You Came"
3. "Don't Stop Moving 'til Sundown" (Bimbo Jones Bootie remix)

== Credits and personnel ==
Credits are lifted from the UK CD1 liner notes.

Studios

- Recorded at RedFly Studios (Sweden) and Strongroom Studios (London, England)
- Mixed at RedFly Studios and (Sweden)
- Mastered at Transfermation (London, England)

Personnel

- Twin – production
  - Niclas Molinder – writing
  - Joacim Persson – writing
- Pelle Ankarberg – writing, co-production
- Andreas Mattsson – writing
- Richard Dowling – mastering

== Charts ==
=== Weekly charts ===
| Chart (2003) | Peak position |
|---|---|
| Europe (Eurochart Hot 100) | 12 |
| Ireland (IRMA) | 12 |
| Scottish Singles Sales (Official Charts) | 5 |
| UK Singles (Official Charts) | 4 |

=== Year-end charts ===
| Chart (2003) | Position |
|---|---|
| UK Singles (OCC) | 109 |
