= Rachel Hyde-Harvey =

English actress and singer (born 1987)

- Born: Rachel Harvey; 21 March 1987 (age 39); Kettering, Northamptonshire, England
- Genres: Pop, rock
- Occupations: Singer; model; actress; musician
- Instruments: Vocals, piano, drums, guitar
- Years active: 1998–present

Rachel Hyde-Harvey (born 21 March 1987) is an English actress and singer, best known for her role as Amy in the CBBC's I Dream alongside S Club 8.

== Education ==
Rachel attended Chaplins Stage School, Northampton. Then she trained at Sylvia Young Theatre School with her I Dream co-star Matt Di Angelo.

== Career ==
Rachel began her acting career in 1998, when she has played Juliet in the drama Romeo and Juliet. In 2000, she took part in two theater productions, both at Wellingborough Castle Youth Theatre: Road, in the role of Helen, and Haroun and the Sea of Stories. In 2001, she played Abigail in The Crucible at Wellingborough Castle Youth Theatre. Rachel was in the cast of Bad'nuff in London's Soho Theatre, playing Jay. In 2002 she briefly appeared in the music video for Busted's ‘That’s what I go to school for’. In 2004, she played Amy in the hit teen drama I Dream on the BBC, where she spoke in an American accent. In 2007, Rachel played Margo in My Family and Other Animals at the Jersey Arts Centre/Corfu. From November 2008 to January 2009, Rachel played Belle in Beauty and the Beast at the South Hill Park Hill Arts Centre in Bracknell. From 2008 to 2010, she played Sofia in Sofia's Diary on Bebo and Channel 5. She was an extra in Harry Potter and the Prisoner of Azkaban as an Hogwarts' chorus member. In 2015 she appeared in The Survival Code's "Rat Race" official video.

=== Music ===
From a young age, Rachel was the lead vocals for several local rock bands, contributing music and lyrics. She is the lead vocals of a band, called Glitch Code. Their first album, "Gifted_Damaged", was released worldwide on 12 February 2016 and it's available in two formats, the Limited Edition CD + Book and the Vinyl version. The first single from the album is "Glimmer". It was released worldwide on 29 August 2016. The official video for the song is on YouTube since 16 June 2016.

== Filmography ==
Year	Series	Role	Note
2000	The Sound of Music: Victoria Wood Christmas Special	Louisa	
2000	The Real Meaning of Christmas	Dancer/Singer	
2003	My Family	Fiona	3 episodes and 2 archive appearances
2004	I Dream	Amy	Series Lead
2005	Holby City	Amy Jones	Recurring
2005	Bricking it!	Georgie	
2006	Doctors	Marie Collins	Recurring
2006	The Bill	Josie Shaw	Recurring
2008	Sofia's Diary	Sofia	Series Lead
2009	Doctors	Tammy Ashdown	Guest star
