= Helen Kurup =

English actress

Helen K Wint (born 9 September 1986 in North London), formerly known as Helen Kurup, is an English actress best known for her role as Khush in the CBBC's I Dream. Helen is an original member of the girl group Goldstone, as well as being managing director of the company. She is the sister of actress and singer Debbie Kurup.

== Career ==
Kurup began dancing at the age of three, before joining the North London Dance Studio to train. She has been performing from just as early an age, appearing in professional productions of The King and I and South Pacific at the Millfield Theatre. She also played a lead role, Shakira, in the musical Instant Celebrity at Freedom in Wardour Street.

In 2004, Kurup was cast as Khush in the BBC children's drama, I Dream. Filming of this took place in Barcelona for a number of months. As part of working on this show, Helen recorded a b-side to the theme song, "Dreaming", titled "Take Me As I Am". She also featured on the album Welcome to Avalon Heights. She also appeared in an episode of Doctors in 2006, playing the part of Nimala Dias, a girl who wanted to become an artist, but was being forced to become a doctor by her mother.

In 2007, she played the part of Isis in Daddy Cool, as well as understudying for the lead, Rose, and features on the Original London Cast soundtrack. She is currently performing as part of Rose and Steel's Motown Xtravaganza, singing Motown, Soul, Rock & Roll, Jazz and Swing.
