= Goldstone (band) =

British girl group

- Origin: United Kingdom
- Genres: Pop
- Years active: 2013–present
- Members: Aimie Atkinson; Helen Wint; Rhiannon Porter
- Website: goldstonelive.com

Goldstone are a British contemporary girl group formed in 2013, consisting of three members from music and stage backgrounds: Aimie Atkinson (creative director), Helen Wint, and Rhiannnon Porter. Aimie and Helen met whilst with the Dirty Dancing theatre show and formed the group through their love of pop music.

== Career ==
=== 2018: Eurovision: You Decide ===
Goldstone were 2018 contestants in Eurovision: You Decide, in a bid to represent the United Kingdom in the Eurovision Song Contest 2018. This was the result of three months of auditions at the BBC's London headquarters, which whittled the contestants down to six finalists.

They performed their pop song, "I Feel The Love" by Eric Lumiere, Joakim Buddee, Laura White and Roel Rats but in the end they lost to SuRie. Despite this, the band members were upbeat and positive about the experience performing at the event.

=== 2018: Voice of Astana winners ===
Goldstone were 2018 winners of The Voice of Astana, held in Kazakhstan.

== Other endeavours ==
In 2017, Atkinson played Katherine Howard in the Original West End cast of SIX the musical in 2019 and would go on to form a seven piece girl group called SVN in 2021 with six other members of this cast: Millie O'Connell, Natalie May Paris, Alexia McIntosh, Jarnéia Richard-Noel, Maiya Quansah-Breed, and their original dance captain, Grace Mouat. In 2022, the group released a number of singles such as "Woman" and "Free". In 2020, she dominated the West End with the main role of Vivian Ward in the UK production of Pretty Woman: The Musical. Despite all this, Aimie continues to remain close to her Goldstone band members.
