= I Dream =

- Genre: Sitcom; Musical; Teen drama Children
- Created by: Simon Fuller
- Developed by: Simon Fuller; Paul Dornan
- Starring: S Club 8 Christopher Lloyd; Matt Di Angelo; Lorna Want; Rachel Hyde-Harvey; George Wood; Helen Kurup
- Opening theme: "Dreaming" by Calvin Goldspink and Frankie Sandford
- Country of origin: United Kingdom (filmed in Spain)
- No. of series: 1
- No. of episodes: 13

Production
- Executive producer: Simon Fuller
- Running time: 25 minutes
- Production company: 19 Entertainment

Original release
- Network: CBBC (on BBC One)
- Release: 22 September – 15 December 2004

I Dream is a British children's musical television comedy programme aimed at teenage audiences, which aired in 2004. It was set at an esteemed performing arts college near Barcelona, Spain, and focuses on 13 teenagers who are invited to enrol at the college, Avalon Heights, over the summer. All eight members of the pop group S Club 8 star in the show alongside five other young actors and actresses and Hollywood film actor Christopher Lloyd of Back to the Future fame.

I Dream has the members of S Club 8 playing supposedly exaggerated versions of themselves, albeit with identical names to their real life counterparts. Each episode of the show includes several (usually two or more) songs and dance numbers involving both members and non-members of the band. Cast member George Wood explained the show "a modern day Fame".

The series' production company was 19 Television, a subsidiary of the corporation 19 Management, which is owned by the show's executive producer, Simon Fuller. The first episode of I Dream aired on Wednesday 22 September 2004 on BBC One. From the week of 23 November episodes were aired on Thursday instead of Wednesday, and the thirteenth and final episode aired on 16 December and featured Laila Rouass. Reruns of the show in the UK were broadcast on the CBBC Channel.

The show was panned by critics, and ended up being cancelled after one series. While the UK aired and ran reruns of the whole series on the BBC, other countries such as Spain, the USA and France, chose to cancel airings of the show mid-series due to low viewing figures.

The show also spawned a soundtrack and third album for S Club 8, called Welcome to Avalon Heights. However, it failed to obtain much commercial success, peaking at number 133 in the UK album charts. It did not chart in any other countries.

Shortly after the show ended, S Club 8 disbanded.

== Cast ==
- Matt Di Angelo as Felix
- Rachel Hyde-Harvey as Amy
- Helen Kurup as Khush
- Lorna Want as Natalie
- George Wood as Ollie
- Jay Asforis as Jay
- Daisy Evans as Daisy
- Calvin Goldspink as Calvin
- Frankie Sandford as Frankie
- Rochelle Wiseman as Rochelle
- Stacey McClean as Stacey
- Hannah Richings as Hannah
- Aaron Renfree as Aaron
- Christopher Lloyd as Professor Toone

== Episodes ==
No.	Title	Original release date	Prod. code
1	"Why Me?"	September 22, 2004	101
Amy, Felix, Ollie, Natalie and Khush receive an invite to Avalon Heights, a top-secret academy for the performing arts. As they settle in under the watchful eyes of Professor Toone and Patrick, self-doubts and questions begin to emerge.
2	"Just for the Record"	September 29, 2004	102
Professor Toone sets the first major assignment. Everyone except Amy quickly finds a partner, leaving her to work with Felix with fiery results. Meanwhile, Calvin and Jay compete for Natalie's attention, only to be exploited by her.
3	"Hold the Front Page"	October 6, 2004	103
The Avalon girls' trip to the beach takes an unexpected turn when Khush is tricked by a scheming journalist into revealing information about Avalon Heights.
4	"Lifestyle"	October 13, 2004	104
Professor Toone teaches the students that the entertainment industry is unpredictable, encouraging them to embrace change and adapt to new situations.
5	"Radio, Radio!"	October 20, 2004	105
Analie and Patrick persuade a reluctant Khush to become the morning DJ, but Felix hijacks the airwaves by launching his own pirate radio station.
6	"Charity Record"	October 27, 2004	106
When developers threaten a local frog pond, Calvin, Frankie and Amy organise a musical protest and recruit Natalie to attract media attention.
7	"Oliver"	November 3, 2004	107
After arguing over who has had the tougher upbringing, Ollie accepts Felix's challenge to live a Dickensian lifestyle in a barn, dividing the students into opposing camps.
8	"Together"	November 10, 2004	108
Music executive Jack Smith invites Stacey to perform at his birthday party, leading Natalie, Stacey and Amy to reluctantly form a girl group.
9	"Jay's Pirate Video"	November 17, 2004	109
Jay decides to direct a film, but his inability to refuse anyone results in almost everyone demanding a starring role.
10	"Rap-unzel"	November 24, 2004	110
The students stage a modern musical adaptation of Rapunzel set on a council estate. Ollie is appointed director and pushes his cast beyond their comfort zones.
11	"Living it Easy"	December 1, 2004	111
Patrick doubles Felix's workload, prompting the students to join Felix in protest. The dispute escalates into a strike involving both students and staff.
12	"Families"	December 8, 2004	112
As the students prepare a drama about families, Ollie's parents arrive unexpectedly and learn far more about their son than they anticipated.
13	"Toone in Love"	December 15, 2004	113
Believing Avalon Heights may have to be sold, Professor Toone returns from a weekend away engaged. Natalie investigates his fiancée and suspects she is interested in the academy's title deeds rather than Toone himself.

== Songs ==
1. "Welcome to Avalon Heights" (Prof. Toone's version), "Why Me?" (Felix, Ollie, Amy, Natalie and Khush), "Why Me?" (Ollie's version)
2. "Beautiful Thing" (Calvin and Jay), "Can I Trust You?" (Felix and Amy)
3. "Waste Your Time on Me" (Natalie), "Take Me as I Am" (Khush)
4. "Make a Change" (Prof. Toone, Frankie and Calvin), "I'm Here" (Ollie)
5. "I'm Not Coming with You" (Khush), "Goodbye Radio" (Felix)
6. "You're a Star" (Natalie), "Don't Steal Our Sunshine" (Frankie and Calvin)
7. "Sunshine" (Ollie), "Been There" (Calvin)
8. "Show Me the Stage" (Calvin, Aaron and Jay), "Our Life" (Stacey, Amy and Natalie)
9. "I Dream" (Amy), "Back Off" (Jay)
10. "Open Up My Heart" (Felix and Amy)
11. "Here Comes Summer" (Calvin), "All of the Above" (Felix)
12. "Higher" (Ollie), "Say It's Alright" (Ollie)
13. "Be My Lollie" (Prof. Toone and Lollie Das), "I Want You" (Prof. Toone and I Dreamers), "I Want You Around" (Felix and Amy)
- Opening Theme: "Dreaming" (Frankie and Calvin)

Note: Rochelle Wiseman, Daisy Evans and Hannah Richings did not have a solo in any of the show's songs.

== Theme song and soundtrack ==
The show's theme song, "Dreaming", was performed by band members Frankie and Calvin and was released as a single on 15 November 2004. It reached number nineteen on the UK Singles Chart, and was billed as 'I Dream featuring Frankie & Calvin'. On 29 November 2004 an official I Dream soundtrack album titled Welcome to Avalon Heights was released and entered the UK Albums Chart at number 133 in its first week. In France, the song "Say It's Alright" was released as a single in July 2005 and reached number 32.
