= S Club Search =

CBBC television show

- Developed by: BBC
- Starring: S Club Juniors
- Judges: S Club 7
- Narrated by: Angellica Bell
- Opening theme: "Don't Stop Movin'" by S Club 7
- Country of origin: United Kingdom
- Original language: English
- No. of seasons: 1
- No. of episodes: 2

Production
- Executive producers: Simon Fuller; Reem Nouss
- Camera setup: Multi-camera
- Running time: 20 minutes (approx.)
- Production companies: BBC; 19 Entertainment

Original release
- Network: CBBC (on BBC One)
- Release: 30 September – 16 December 2001

Related
- S Club Juniors: The Story

S Club Search is a CBBC reality television show that documents the audition process and formation for the pop group S Club Juniors in 2001. The original concept was that the children would perform at Wembley as a support act to S Club 7 on their S Club 7 Carnival 2002 tour, but their appearance at Wembley was considered such a success that 19 Entertainment, the management company that had created S Club 7 and auditioned S Club Juniors, decided they should perform as a support act at all of the venues on the Carnival tour. Following the tour, the eight (formally nine) children went on to form the group "S Club Juniors" (later renamed to "S Club 8") and had six top ten UK hits.

== Selected candidates ==
- Aaron Renfree
- Calvin Goldspink
- Daisy Evans
- Frankie Sandford
- Hannah Richings
- Jay Asforis
- Rochelle Wiseman
- Stacey McClean
- Connor Daley

Originally, only seven children were supposed to be chosen, but the judges (including S Club 7) were so impressed by Hannah Richings and Aaron Renfree's performances, that they asked them to join the band the following day after the initial selection.

Connor Daley was removed from the group during the rehearsal period due to inappropriate behaviour towards the other members. He later appeared on the kids' version of Stars in Their Eyes, but did not win. He can be seen in the first two episodes of S Club Search.

== Audition venues ==
- Manchester
- Glasgow
- Cardiff
- London

== Episodes ==
No.	Title	Original release date	Prod. code
1	"Reaching for the Stars"	2001	101
This episode features how the juniors got chosen for the band and interviews from them.
2	"Bring the House Down"	2001	102
This episode shows the juniors doing some homework and a preview of them rehearsing for their upcoming tour. It is announced in this episode that Connor Daley is no longer in the band.
