= Heart of England School =

Location
- Gipsy Lane; Balsall Common, West Midlands, CV7 7FW; England
- Coordinates: 52.3860°N 1.6479°W

Information
- Type: Academy
- Motto: Creating Futures
- Local authority: Solihull
- Department for Education URN: 136909 Tables
- Ofsted: Reports
- Principal: Mr Bennett
- Gender: Coeducational
- Age: 11 to 18
- Enrolment: 1300 (approx)
- Houses: Voyager, Phoenix, Pioneer and Apollo
- Colour: teal blue
- Website: heart-england.co.uk

Heart of England School is a secondary school and sixth form with academy status located in Balsall Common in the West Midlands. Its catchment is the south-east of the Metropolitan Borough of Solihull, primarily rural and commuter villages.

== History ==
The school was opened in 1957 and was formerly a secondary modern school. It became a comprehensive school in 1974 when it became part of the metropolitan borough of Solihull. In 1998 a new sixth form block was added with four additional classrooms and a dedicated computer suite. In 2011 the school converted to academy status.

In 1984 pupils from the school starred in an episode of the ITV Good Health series titled Germs, Germs, Germs, written by Peter Brookes, the School drama teacher.

When David Hempleman-Adams undertook his Ultimate Challenge Expedition in 1996 (leading a team of novices to ski to the Magnetic North Pole, having already completed a solo walk to the South Pole), sixth formers at Heart of England School were invited to create a website, which provided up to date tracking of the expedition and information on the history of polar exploration. The work required an upgrade of the school's IT facilities to allow it to connect to the Internet, and allow the students to learn to code for the nascent web technologies.

In 2003 the school made national headlines when the headmistress trialled the use of sniffer dogs to prevent pupils from bringing in drugs. Although she described the school as not troublesome, there had been occasional issues with drug taking in the recent past. The school hired counter drugs specialists to conduct the scheme.

An extension used for sporting activities and dancing was built in 2007, part-financed with lottery money.

== Campus ==
The school has three main blocks (Main block, Hampton block and Leveson block). The P.E. block, a part of main block, consists of a Dance Studio, a Gym, a Sports Hall and lessons also take place in the hall, tennis courts and field. The playing field abuts the Primary School field. In September 2010 an extension to the Hampton Building was added to provide much needed specialist accommodation for Maths, Languages, Food Technology and Drama.

The school is a provider for the Duke of Edinburgh's award.

== Notable former pupils ==
- Andy Hopkins, bass guitarist for rock band, The Enemy
- Tom Milnes - Cricketer
- Lorna Want - Actress

== Bibliography ==
- Cricketers' Who's Who 2017. Jellyfish Publishing Solutions. 29 March 2017. ISBN 978-1-909811-34-8.
- "Balsall Common head to retire". Coventry Evening Telegraph. 25 May 1976. p. 4.
- "Heart of England gets top marks". Coventry Evening Telegraph. 5 February 1996. p. 5.
- "Parent poll says no to grammar school". Coventry Evening Telegraph. 23 February 1984. p. 9.
- "The Enemy all set to make a lot of friends". Coventry Live. 6 November 2006.
- "Sports and dance centre opens". Coventry Live. 19 July 2007.
- "Move over Charlotte, here's Lorna". The Daily Telegraph. 23 October 2002.
- "School brings in drug dogs". The Daily Telegraph. 28 January 2003. p. 11.
- "Mary Schofield". The Daily Telegraph. 21 August 1981. p. 7.
- "A dog's life: Sniffer for drugs at school". The Guardian. 28 January 2003. p. 13.
- "Head of housekeeping". The Guardian. 29 March 1983. p. 11.
- "Germbusters". The Times Higher Educational Supplement. 1984.
- "3D Virtual Tour of our School". Heart of England School. 21 September 2020.
- "Duke of Edinburgh's Award". Heart of England School. 12 October 2018.
- Hughes, Michael (2005). Judgement impaired : law disorder and injustice to victims in 21st century Britain. [England] : Hande-Cuffe. ISBN 978-0-9550397-0-6.
- "Heart of England School - Inspection Report". ofsted.gov.uk. Ofsted. 2013.
- Schofield, Mary (January 1982). "Re-Entry or Launch? Applications of an Industrial Secondment to the Work of a School". School Organisation. 2 (1): 93–99. doi:10.1080/0260136820020111.
- "Solihull Education News". Solihull News. 26 June 1998.
- "Playground drugs scandal hits school". Solihull Times. 10 July 1998. p. 1.
- Walker, Dorothy (15 April 1996). "Pupils in Pole Position". The Independent. p. 31.
