= Dreaming (I Dream song) =

Single by Frankie Sandford and Calvin Goldspink

from the album Welcome to Avalon Heights
- B-side: "Welcome to Avalon Heights" "Take Me as I Am" "I'm Here"
- Released: 15 November 2004
- Recorded: 2004
- Genre: Pop
- Label: Polydor
- Songwriter: ?

S Club 8 singles chronology
"Don't Tell Me You're Sorry" (2003)	"Dreaming" (2004)

Frankie Sandford singles chronology
"Don't Tell Me You're Sorry" (2003)	"Dreaming" (2004)	"If This Is Love" (2008)

"Dreaming" is a song by pop singers and S Club 8 members Frankie Sandford and Calvin Goldspink, released as the first single from the I Dream TV series soundtrack album Welcome to Avalon Heights.

It was released on 15 November 2004, peaking at #19 on the UK Singles Chart.

Frankie Sandford sings the entirety of the song along with Calvin Goldspink, plus solo backing vocals in the intro and during the bridge.

== Track listing ==
CD 1

1. "Dreaming"
2. "Welcome to Avalon Heights"

CD2

1. "Dreaming"
2. "Take Me As I Am"
3. "I'm Here"
4. "Dreaming" (Karaoke version)
5. "Dreaming" (D-Bop Vocal Mix)
6. "Dreaming" (Music video)
