= S Club 8 =

Spin-off of the British pop group S Club 7 (2001–2005)

- Also known as: S Club Juniors
- Origin: London, England
- Genres: Pop; Dance-pop; Bubblegum pop
- Works: S Club 8 discography
- Years active: 2001–2005
- Label: Polydor
- Spinoff of: S Club
- Past members: Jay Asforis; Connor Daley; Daisy Evans; Calvin Goldspink; Stacey McClean; Aaron Renfree; Hannah Richings; Frankie Sandford; Rochelle Wiseman

S Club 8 (originally S Club Juniors) were a spin-off of the British pop group S Club 7. The children were all in their early teens or younger when they were chosen from thousands of hopefuls on the television series S Club Search to appear as a support act for pop band S Club 7.

S Club Juniors were originally intended only as a support act at Wembley Arena for the S Club Carnival Tour but were deemed so successful that they went on to support S Club 7 throughout every British date of the tour. They later released their own debut single, "One Step Closer", followed by other singles "Automatic High", "New Direction" and "Puppy Love/Sleigh Ride". This was followed by their debut album, Together.

After changing the group name to S Club 8, they released the singles "Fool No More", "Sundown" and a remixed version of their album track, "Don't Tell Me You're Sorry". They then released a second album, Sundown.

The group appeared in their own TV Show, I Dream, alongside other young actors including Lorna Want, who had originally auditioned for S Club Juniors herself, as well as Matt Di Angelo. The show also featured Christopher Lloyd of Back to the Future fame. I Dream spawned a soundtrack and a third album for S Club 8, called Welcome to Avalon Heights. It peaked at number 133 in the UK album charts. It did not chart in any other countries.

A documentary series titled S Club Juniors: The Story was produced about the early days of the group.

S Club 8 disbanded in 2005, after almost four years.

== History ==
=== 2001–2002: Formation and Together ===
S Club Juniors was formed in 2001 through a CBBC reality television show, S Club Search, and originally was supposed to consist of seven members aged 11–14. S Club Juniors were intended to be a one-time support act to pop group S Club 7, who were the inspiration behind the group. Thousands of children auditioned, and were whittled down in several rounds. Notable people who also auditioned for S Club Search included Rylan Clark, Ferne Mccann, and Lorna Want. The 14 children who made the final round met S Club 7, who helped judge the finalists. As he was unable to make the audition date, eventual member Jay Asforis sent a video tape of himself to the producers, and was immediately put into the final round.

The first seven members chosen were Asforis, Calvin Goldspink, Daisy Evans, Stacey McClean, Rochelle Wiseman, Francesca Sandford and Connor Daley. All were aged 11–12.

The producers of the show and S Club 7 discussed two other candidates who had impressed them: 13-year-old Aaron Renfree and 10-year-old Hannah Richings. It was decided to make S Club Juniors a nine-member group. Shortly after, the group went into rehearsals, taught by choreographer Gary Lloyd and vocal coaches David and Carrie Grant.

In the later stages of rehearsals, three weeks before their support act slot at Wembley Arena, Daley was removed from the group.

S Club Juniors' appearances were considered a success by 19 Entertainment, the management company that had created S Club 7 and auditioned S Club Juniors. Consequently, it was decided they should perform as a support act at all of the venues on the tour. The juniors made their first television appearance on Children in Need on 16 November 2001. By the end of the tour, S Club Juniors had created a following and Polydor Records signed the group. Their first single was called "One Step Closer". It was promoted by the TV series S Club Junior: The Story, and released in the UK on 22 April 2002, staying in the UK chart for eleven weeks.

The group began working on their first album in June 2002. A video for the second single, "Automatic High", was filmed in Spain, while S Club 7 began their fourth TV series. Released on 22 July 2002, the single reached number 2 in the UK charts. The third single, "New Direction", was released on 10 October and also reached number 2. BBC1’s The Saturday Show ran a karaoke competition to find a member of the public to perform “New Direction” alongside The Juniors. The winner, 14-year-old Aidan Salter, later appeared on the junior version of Stars In Their Eyes and went on to compete on The X Factor under the name Aidan Martin.

The Juniors then released their debut album Together on 21 October reaching number 5. Their fourth single, "Puppy Love/Sleigh Ride", was released on 9 December 2002. The single debuted at number 6 in the UK charts. The song was also used in the 2003 film Love Actually.

=== 2003–2023: Sundown, I Dream, split, The Big Reunion, Instagram live series ===
The group joined the S Club United tour in April 2003, billed as S Club 8, releasing a fifth single, "Fool No More", on 30 June. It reached number 4 in the UK chart. A second single, "Sundown", was released in the UK on 29 September 2003 reaching number 4 in the UK. The album, Sundown, was released on 13 October 2003 and reached number 13. The record company perceived the album as a failure. In a review for BBC Music, Jack Smith stated that some of Sundown's tracks, "come across as brattier, livelier, younger relatives of... S Club('s)", and that "the album only really flags when the '8 attempt to do more grown-up songs". The third single, "Don't Tell Me You're Sorry", was released on 29 December 2003 in the UK where it reached number 11.

After this, the band turned to acting and were cast in the show, I Dream which portrayed S Club 8 as members of a larger ensemble cast. Despite the show being tailored around them, every member of S Club 8 still had to audition. I Dream revolved around the summer school Avalon Heights, run by Professor Toone (played by Christopher Lloyd of Back to the Future fame), where the characters tried to improve their talents in the performing arts. On 15 November 2004, the show's theme tune "Dreaming" was released as a single, sung by members Sandford and Goldspink. The single charted at number 19. On 29 November 2004 an album titled Welcome to Avalon Heights was released, containing songs from the show performed by S Club 8 members and the rest of the cast. The album debuted at number 133. The group disbanded in 2005.

In 2012, member McClean revealed that the band had been “so close to being part of” ITV’s The Big Reunion. Member Renfree also spoke about the show on an Instagram live, citing that once member Goldspink had later decided to not take part, that the band were dropped from the potential lineup.

In 2020, during the COVID-19 lockdown, member Asforis (now Perry) held an Instagram live series, interviewing the other seven members in turn over the course of seven weeks.

In 2023, when S Club reunited for The Good Times tour, many fans asked if S Club 8 would also be reuniting. Members McClean and Renfree held an Instagram Live Q&A to confirm that S Club 8 had not been asked to reunite for the tour. Both McClean and Renfree encouraged fans to “make some noise” in support, to encourage a paid opportunity for a professional reunion. A petition was started shortly after, aiming for an initial 500 signatures. As of 2025, it has garnered 324 signatures.

== Members ==
- Jay Asforis (born 30 October 1989, 37 years old) did not appear at the S Club Juniors initial auditions, instead sending a video tape of himself to S Club 7 who allowed him through to the final auditions. He trained at The Susi Earnshaw Theatre School and attended Roding Valley High School. From March 2018, Asforis starred as the leading role of Berry Gordy in the West End production of Motown: The Musical in Shaftesbury Theatre, London. As of November 2019, Asforis can be seen as understudy for the roles of Alexander Hamilton and Marquis de Lafayette/Thomas Jefferson in Hamilton at the Victoria Palace Theatre. In 2023, Asforis joined the cast of Back to the Future: The Musical as Mayor Goldie Wilson. Asforis is gay, and has talked about struggling with his sexuality while in S Club 8. Since leaving the band, Asforis now goes by the name Jay Perry professionally; Perry is his middle name.
- Connor Daley (born c.1989) was one of the original members of S Club Juniors who was chosen. He appears in the first two episodes of the show S Club Search as well as some of the earlier television interviews of S Club Juniors. A few weeks into rehearsals, Connor was removed from the band. In 2003, he appeared in the kids’ version of Stars in Their Eyes portraying Usher, but did not win.
- Daisy Evans (born 30 November 1989, 36 years old): From early 2007, Evans was a member of five-piece female group, From Above. After touring the UK and a series of line-up changes, in September 2008 they were signed by Beyoncé's father Mathew Knowles and Music World Records. The group moved to America to work on their debut album, documented on the MTV reality show, Breaking From Above. A music video for debut "Not The Same Girl" was released on 2 December 2011. The single and the album, Breaking From Above was released on 12 December. They then arrived for the "boot camp" stages for The X Factor, but were rejected. In 2013 Evans became engaged to footballer Jonjo Shelvey. They went on to marry in June 2015. The couple's first daughter arrived on 4 March 2014. Evans gave birth to the couple's second daughter, on 31 May 2016. In July 2020 during an Instagram live with bandmate Asforis, Evans announced she was expecting her third child, a boy later that year. Her son was born on 4 November 2020. Evans now works as a make-up artist, under her married name, Daisy Shelvey.
- Calvin Goldspink (born 24 January 1989, 37 years old). After S Club 8 ended, Goldspink went on to appear in the only season of Life is Wild for the CW network in 2007. He also appeared in shows Lifetimes, William & Kate and FOX's X-Men Origins. His song 'Don't Fail Me' has featured on various adverts for shows such as Jersey Shore and Love & Hip Hop: Atlanta, and it also featured on Love Is Blind season 1 episode 9 as part of their soundtrack. Goldspink worked at The Peppermint Club, Los Angeles as a talent booker. He also founded Breaking Sound, a music company helping support emerging artists internationally. In 2020, he released a song called "The Cold". Goldspink married designer Melissa Callabero in 2015. They have two daughters. He is of German descent through his mothers side.
- Stacey McClean (born 17 February 1989, 37 years old) is from Blackpool, Lancashire. She is a quarter Nigerian. McClean appeared on series 6 of The X Factor in 2009 and made it to the Top 6 Girls. McClean was previously married to former footballer Fraser Franks and had a daughter with him in 2019. She announced her separation from Franks in 2023 and their divorce in 2024 McClean later went on to perform with Bradley McIntosh and Tina Barrett as part of S Club Allstars.
- Aaron Renfree (born 19 December 1987, 38 years old) was not originally selected to be a part of S Club Juniors but joined two days later. He was the oldest member of S Club 8 and starred in I Dream but did not appear in every episode due to studying for his GCSEs at the time of filming. After S Club 8 split in 2004, Renfree went back to college and trained at Laine Theatre Arts where he graduated with a National Diploma in Musical Theatre. He then went on to become a part of the chorus of the original cast of Flashdance the Musical which toured the UK in 2008/09 followed by his West End debut in We Will Rock You in 2009/10. He has danced with Matt Terry, the Saturdays (with two of the group members being Sandford and Humes from S Club 8), as well as on the X Factor Tours where he was also assistant show director. Renfree has choreographed the Professionals On Ice tours which lead him onto working with Torvil & Dean in Panto and then onto Dancing on Ice on ITV. Renfree was also on screen choreographer for The Greatest Dancer on BBC One and worked with Maddie and Mackenzie Ziegler on the UK Tour. During the 2020 and 2021 lockdowns in the UK, Renfree posted dance routines on TikTok. Renfree is gay, and has taken part in the NoH8 campaign.
- Hannah Richings (born 30 November 1990, 35 years old) was not originally selected to be a part of S Club Juniors but she joined two days later when Simon Fuller said he didn't want to go ahead without Richings being a part of the group. Richings was the youngest member of S Club 8, and the only member that was out of the band's initial intended age range. She also only auditioned on the day, because her older sister Eloise was, and spoke of her mixed feelings when she got chosen and Eloise didn't. Richings was also a cast member on I Dream. Richings released one solo single which was given out free with S Club Juniors Magazine. She then left the entertainment industry entirely, and later got a job in Barclays Bank. She now has her own childminding business, Little Buds. Richings is married to Phil Blackford, and they have two sons and two daughters.
- Frankie Sandford (born 14 January 1989, 37 years old). Sandford attended Hall Mead School, in Upminster, and already knew Wiseman, a few years before they both got in S Club Juniors. After leaving S Club 8, Sandford went back to school and then worked as a shop assistant. In 2007, Sandford auditioned for and was accepted into the Saturdays, along with Wiseman, and they toured with Girls Aloud in May 2008 as the support act for the Tangled Up Tour. The group's first single, "If This Is Love", was released on 28 July 2008 and reached number 8 in the UK. They also released "Up", "Issues", "Just Can't Get Enough" for Comic Relief and "Work". They have so far released four albums to critical and commercial success. On 9 October 2008, Sandford appeared as a guest on Never Mind the Buzzcocks on Phill Jupitus' team. In 2010, Sandford appeared as a featured artist in the Kids in Glass Houses' song "Undercover Lover" from their album, Dirt. Since December 2010, Sandford has been in a relationship with footballer Wayne Bridge. Sandford announced her engagement to Bridge on 8 April 2013 via Twitter. Sandford and Bridge married in 2014. They welcomed two sons in 2013 and 2015. She took part in, and finished runner-up in, the 2014 series of Strictly Come Dancing, partnered with professional dancer Kevin Clifton. Sandford now goes by her married name professionally.
- Rochelle Wiseman (born 21 March 1989, 37 years old) was a member of S Club 8 and a cast member on I Dream. She is half Jamaican. She attended Coopers Company and Coborn School in Upminster, and already knew Frankie Sandford, a few years before S Club Juniors. During her time in the group Wiseman had a stint as presenter on the BBC children's programme Smile. She is also part of pop-group The Saturdays along with Sandford. In February 2007, Wiseman appeared briefly on the BBC Two quiz show Never Mind the Buzzcocks as part of the show's regular Identity Parade feature, where contestants guess which person out of a lineup of five was featured in an old music video played only to the audience and viewers. The team, consisting of Bill Bailey, Russell Howard and Romeo Stodart (from the band The Magic Numbers), correctly picked Wiseman from the lineup. On 22 October 2009, Wiseman appeared as a guest on Never Mind the Buzzcocks on Phill Jupitus' team. Wiseman modelled for Love Me Love My Clothes (LMLC) and also took part in the Miss England contest, finishing in third place. Wiseman joined girl group the Saturdays, with whom she has achieved 13 UK top ten singles and 4 UK top 10 albums. Wiseman has been in a relationship with JLS member Marvin Humes since March 2010. They got engaged on 31 December 2011 and married on 27 July 2012 at Blenheim Palace. She is now professionally known by her married name, Rochelle Humes. Wiseman and Humes have two daughters and a son.

== Discography ==
Studio albums

- Together (2002) (as S Club Juniors)
- Sundown (2003)

Soundtrack albums

- Welcome to Avalon Heights (2004) (for I Dream)

== Filmography ==
Year	Title	Role	Notes
2001	S Club Search	Themselves / Contestants	Reality series
2002	S Club Juniors: The Story	Themselves	Reality series
2002	Viva S Club	Crowd of fans	"The Fame in Spain" (Season 1: episode 1)
2004	I Dream	Themselves	Main roles

== Concert tours ==
Co-headlining

- S Club United (2003) (with S Club)

Opening act

- S Club 7: Carnival Tour (2002) (S Club 7)
