= Simon Fuller =

British businessman & producer (born 1960)

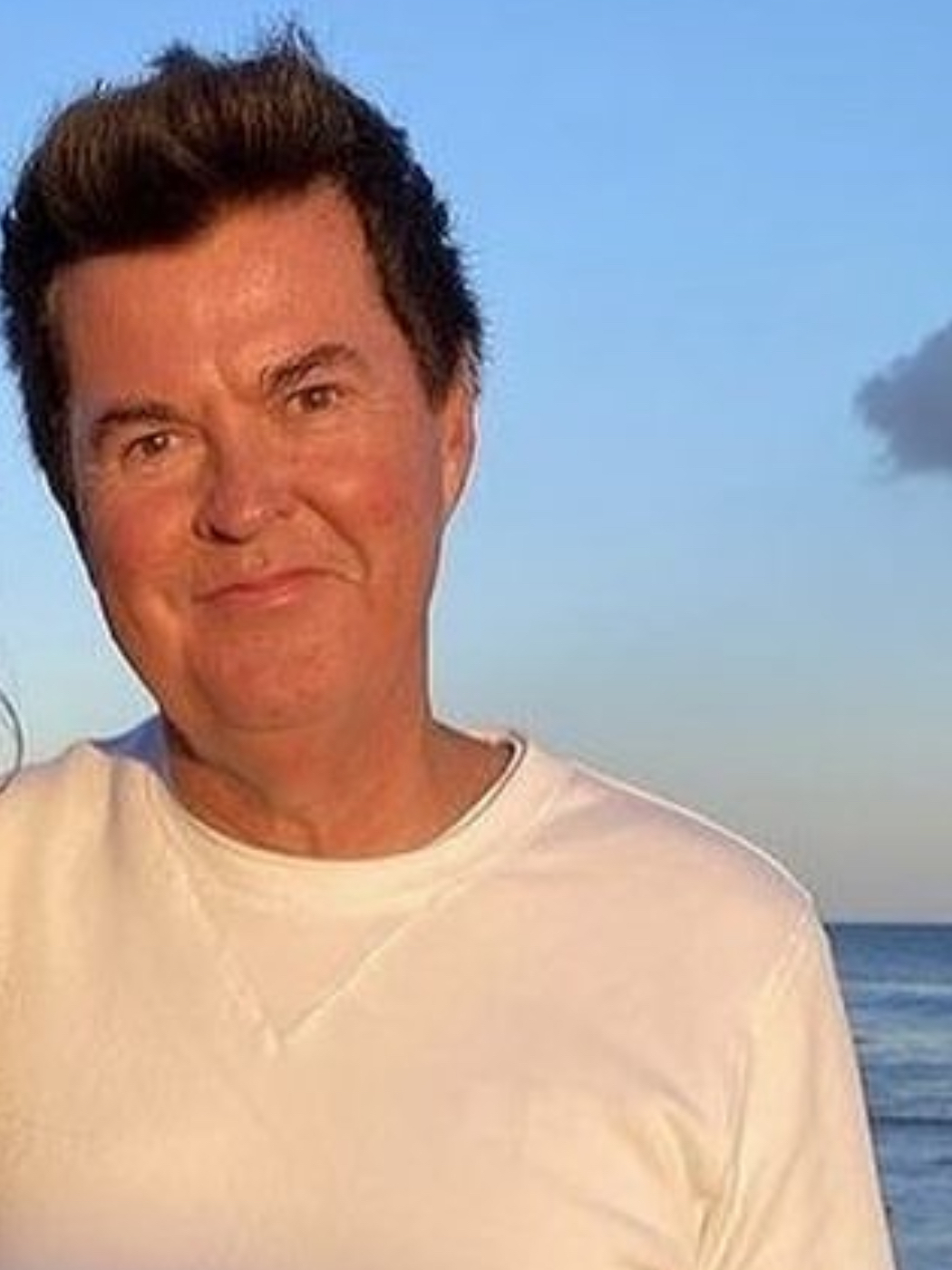
- Simon Fuller in 2022
- Born: Simon Robert Fuller; 17 May 1960 (age 66); British Cyprus
- Occupations: Talent manager, television producer, investor, creative consultant
- Years active: 1981–present
- Employer(s): 19 Entertainment (1985–2010); XIX Entertainment (2010–present)
- Spouse: Natalie Swanston (m. 2008)
- Children: 3
- Website: xixentertainment.com

Simon Robert Fuller (born 17 May 1960) is a British entrepreneur, artist manager, and film and television producer. He is the creator of the Idols TV format, including the British series Pop Idol and the American series American Idol.

Fuller came to prominence in the 1990s for managing the British girl group the Spice Girls, and he has since managed acts in various fields of entertainment, from sports stars David Beckham and Lewis Hamilton to other musicians such as Amy Winehouse and Annie Lennox.

Since 2020, Fuller has been working with tech firm TikTok to aid development of new TikTok creatives and in the same year he announced a partnership with Verizon Communications to develop 5G content. In 2021, Pearson PLC announced a partnership with Fuller to create a new global education business in Performing Arts. In 2016, Fuller persuaded Swedish quartet ABBA to reunite to explore working in virtual reality, which led to the ABBA Voyage project.

In 2007, Time named Fuller as one of the 100 most influential people in the world. He has been certified as the most successful British music manager of all time by Billboard. Fuller received the 2,441st star on the Hollywood Walk of Fame on 23 May 2011. In 2014, he was awarded an honorary degree by the University of Brighton in his home county East Sussex in recognition for his "contribution to business, entrepreneurship and philanthropy". The 2020 Sunday Times Rich List estimated Fuller's wealth at £445 million.

== Biography ==
Fuller was born on 17 May 1960 in British Cyprus. The family later moved to Accra, Ghana where his father was the headmaster of the British Military School, Burma Camp. The family moved back to Hastings, East Sussex, where Simon's father became headmaster of the school he attended. He has two brothers, Kim and Mark.

Fuller began his career in 1981 at Chrysalis Music Limited in the UK, where he signed Madonna's first hit "Holiday" to the company. He started his own management company in 1985, 19 Entertainment, eventually selling the business to CKX, Inc. in a cash and stock deal worth over $200 million in March 2005. In 2008 the company delivered a profit of $92.5 million (£66m) into the parent company. Fuller became a director of CKX, a position which gave him creative control over all of CKX's assets including the Elvis Presley Estate, Muhammad Ali's business interests, and other rights properties, until January 2010 when he started a new firm, XIX Entertainment, while continuing to work with CKX/19 as a consultant and executive producer. XIX Entertainment was given a valuation of $100 million and is run from offices in London and Los Angeles.

In February 2008, Fuller was presented with the PGA Award by the Producers Guild of America in Hollywood. At the event he was praised for his creativity, entrepreneurship, and charity work by British Prime Minister Gordon Brown and current King Charles III, who was still the Prince of Wales at the time, who also thanked Fuller for his support of the Prince's charity The Prince's Trust.

=== TV production, formats, technology ===
Fuller's first broadcast venture was Miami 7, a scripted TV drama starring the British pop group S Club 7 screened by BBC/Fox Kids in 100+ territories around the world. Miami 7 launched the careers of several stars including Rachel Stevens, Jon Lee, Holly Willoughby, and Ben Barnes, and the show created a blueprint for the teen-oriented television musicals that followed, including Glee and High School Musical.

In 2001, Fuller created Pop Idol, a prime time TV show on British television that Maggie Brown in The Guardian states "became a seminal reality/entertainment format". The show produced instant No 1 chart hits, including for Will Young, whose single "Evergreen" was named by NME magazine in 2012 as the "biggest selling single of the century" in the UK. Fuller sold Pop Idol around the world, and he has been credited with creating the world's most valuable TV format with a value of over $8 billion made up of revenue from sponsors, merchandising, telephone, music sales, broadcast and advertising sources. In the US, American Idol became a No.1 rated show. The show made stars of its presenter Ryan Seacrest as well as Simon Cowell, Randy Jackson and Paula Abdul as well as many of its performers including Kelly Clarkson, Carrie Underwood and others. Over 30 million viewers saw David Cook win the seventh season of American Idol in May 2008 and when Fuller re-launched the show in 2011 for its 10th season ratings climbed 20% for the finale event. 122.4 million votes were cast, a record for a reality TV show.

In 2004, Fuller created teen musical TV series, I Dream. This featured the S Club 7 spin-off band, S Club 8. It also featured Christopher Lloyd of Back to the Future fame. I Dream ended after thirteen episodes, and was panned by critics.

In 2005, Fuller, along with co-creator Nigel Lythgoe, launched So You Think You Can Dance on the Fox network in the US. The show grew over 16 seasons to become a regular summer hit. In 2012, Simon Fuller's XIX Entertainment created a new international format with Jennifer Lopez, Marc Anthony, and Jamie King named Q'Viva! The Chosen, and described as a celebration of Latin culture that screened in 21 territories reaching over 30 million Spanish-speaking TV viewers.

In December 2016, Norwegian state broadcaster NRK announced that it had concluded a deal with Simon Fuller to produce the English language version of Skam; Fuller later announced a deal with Facebook to launch the award-winning drama format SKAM Austin in the US in 2018.

In 2017, international news media reported on auditions being staged by Fuller's business XIX for Now United, a real time access global pop group being cast in 14 cities around the world. In 2019, the London Evening Standard confirmed that BBC One would broadcast Serengeti, a wildlife drama created by Fuller. In July 2020, American media reported that "Serengeti", voiced by Lupita Nyong'o, created by Simon Fuller, was nominated for a Primetime EMMY Award.

In February 2023, Fuller created a fictional anthropomorphic animal band/dance troupe, The Meeps, whose debut single is "Love Louder".

== Impact on music culture ==
Fuller came to prominence in the 1990s for managing the pop group the Spice Girls. He has managed acts including Victoria Beckham, Annie Lennox, S Club 7, S Club Juniors, Now United, Steven Tyler, Amy Winehouse, Carrie Underwood, Kelly Clarkson, Will Young, Emma Bunton, Any Gabrielly, Lisa Marie Presley and many more in addition to sportsmen Andy Murray and Lewis Hamilton.

In 2008, Fuller was certified as the most successful British music manager of all time by Billboard magazine. He has managed the career of Annie Lennox since the release of her multi-platinum album Diva in 1991. He has managed hit songwriters and producers, including Cathy Dennis, who first met Fuller as the singer of D Mob in the 1980s. Under Fuller's guidance, Dennis became the UK's No. 1 female songwriter with a string of hits for artists including Kylie Minogue, Britney Spears, Katy Perry, Pink, Will Young, and others.

Fuller managed the Spice Girls through the peak of their 1990s success. Under Fuller's guidance, the Spice Girls became a marketing phenomenon, rose to chart topper status worldwide and went on to sell over 85 million records. In 2002, Fuller's company discovered 19-year-old Amy Winehouse, produced her first award-winning album Frank and signed her to Universal Music.

In 2005, 2006, and 2007, the biggest selling music acts in North America (Kelly Clarkson, Carrie Underwood, and Daughtry) were all managed by Fuller. In October 2016, Fuller announced a joint venture with the 4 original members of the Swedish supergroup ABBA to create a new digital ABBA. In August 2020, BBC News announced that Fuller had signed an exclusive agreement with tech firm TikTok. In 2025 Fuller's longterm partnership with Nick Shymansky's Day One Music management company led to a UK No.1 and global hit for Lola Young.

In 2001, while managing S Club 7, Fuller wanted to put together a spin-off band of ‘mini-me’s’ to support S Club 7 on tour. This resulted in a reality-TV type show, S Club Search, and a new band called S Club Juniors (later known as S Club 8.) The members of the band were aged 10–13. Initially S Club Juniors were only meant to support S Club 7 on one of their tour dates at Wembley Arena; however the Juniors’ proved to be so popular, that they supported S Club 7 on every tour date and later toured alongside them for the S Club United tour. S Club 8 also went on to release seven singles, two albums and a TV show, I Dream.

== Fashion activity ==
Fuller owns significant stakes in several British fashion businesses including Victoria Beckham Ltd. In 2006, Fuller brokered the deal for 19 Entertainment to purchase a majority share in Storm Model Management. In 2008, after assembling a highly qualified creative team Fuller launched the Victoria Beckham dress collection at New York Fashion Week. Since then, Victoria Beckham Limited has grown to become a best-selling high-end fashion brand, stocked in over 400 outlets around the world and winning Brand of The Year at the 2012 and 2014 British Fashion Awards. In 2012, Fuller accompanied Victoria Beckham to launch the business in China.

In February 2012, XIX Entertainment launched a David Beckham bodywear range in 2,500 H&M stores around the world. This was followed in 2015 when Fuller announced a joint venture with Hong Kong-based Global Brands Group Holding Ltd (787) giving Fuller and Beckham ownership of their own apparel business specifically to develop the David Beckham brand and other consumer products. The first result of this partnership was the Fall 2016 re-launch of the British heritage menswear label Kent & Curwen, which under Beckham, Fuller and 7 Global ownership currently runs 113 stores in 51 cities worldwide. In 2019, US media reported that Fuller sold 33% share of the David Beckham business for $50 million after generating revenue of $72.4 million and a profit of $16 million for fiscal 2017.

== Sport activity ==
In 2003, Fuller formed a joint venture partnership with British footballer David Beckham and went onto build a diverse range of business interests in sport, leisure, fashion and entertainment over a period of 16 years that became known as Brand Beckham. In 2006 Fuller took on representation of the England football team at Beckham's suggestion and the following year Fuller negotiated his five-year contract for Beckham to join LA Galaxy. In 2013, Fuller and Beckham discussed plans to buy an MLS football team in Miami with Beckham thanking Fuller in an interview with CNN: “When I signed my contract my manager Simon Fuller actually got a clause in the contract that enabled me to have a franchise at the end of my playing career”.

Later in the same year Fuller and Beckham launched a new global whisky in partnership with British drinks company Diageo. Fuller's plan to deliver Beckham's ownership of an MLS team was announced in January 2018 when Miami was confirmed as 25th MLS team. The Financial Times reported that Fuller sold his interests in David Beckham's business in 2019 for a reported £50m. In 2025, The Sunday Times published an interview in which Fuller explained how he created "Brand Beckham".

In 2009, Fuller took on personal representation of British No.1 tennis player Andy Murray, representing him during his US Open and Wimbledon wins and later helping the player to establish his own business. In March 2011, Fuller was announced as the manager of British F1 driver Lewis Hamilton and surprised many when he moved Hamilton from McLaren and signed him to a long-term contract with the MercedesAMG team. Hamilton won the 2014 F1 World Championship and publicly thanked Fuller for his support.

== Personal life ==
Fuller married his long-term partner Natalie Swanston in May 2008, and they have three children. In May 2025, his wife Natalie filed for divorce.

He has a portfolio of property including properties in Europe, North America, and South America. In 2014, Fuller was awarded an honorary degree by the University of Brighton in recognition for his "contribution to business, entrepreneurship and philanthropy".

== Awards and nominations ==
- 2016 Entrepreneur of the Year Britweek Award
- 2016 Governor's Award Creative Arts Emmy
- 2014 Honorary Degree, University of Brighton
- 2011 Star on Hollywood Walk of Fame
- 2007 Top Trend Setter, Forbes Magazine
