= Rochelle Humes =

English singer and presenter (born 1989)

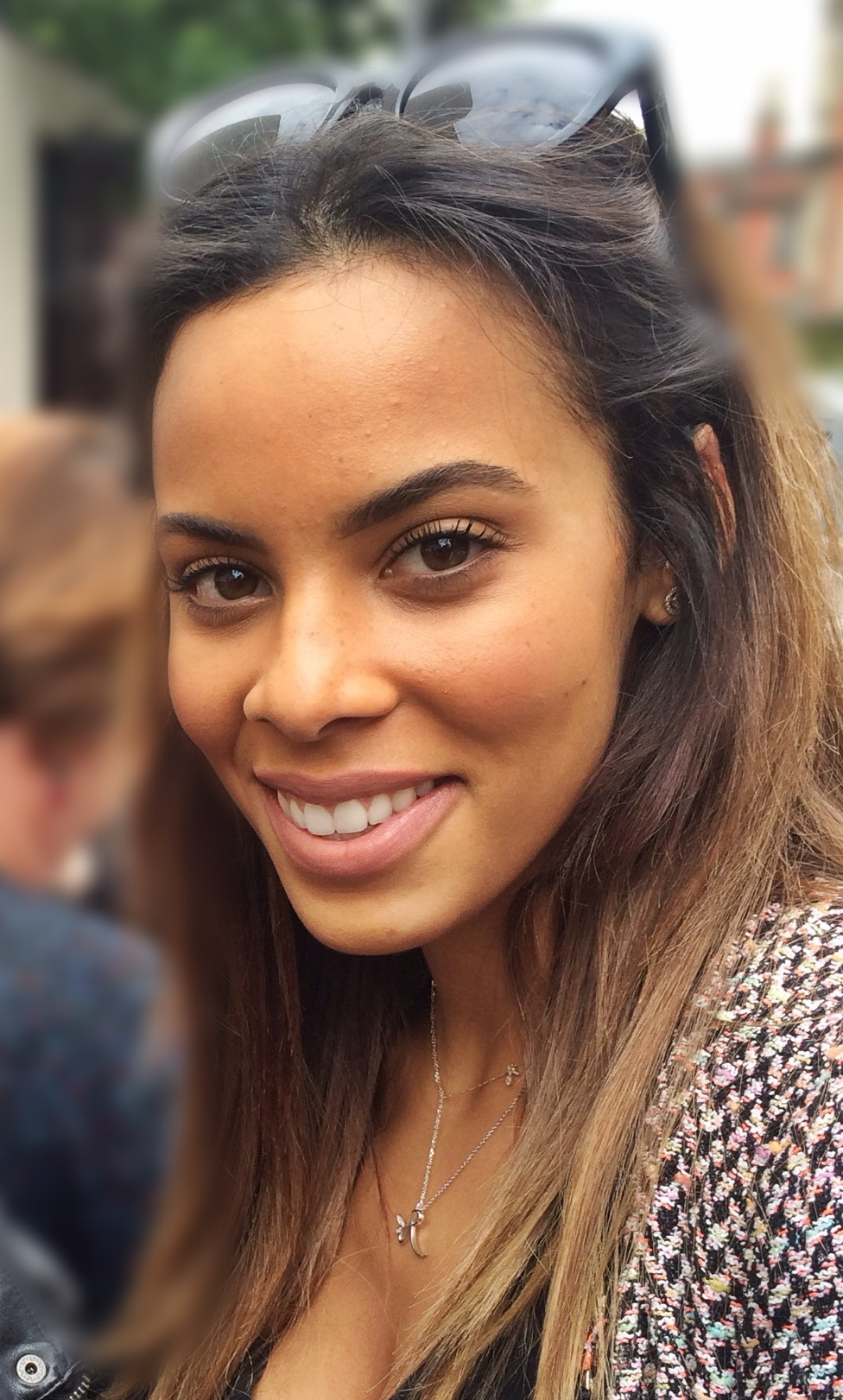
- Humes in 2014
- Born: Rochelle Eulah Eileen Wiseman; 21 March 1989 (age 37); Barking, London, England
- Education: Coopers' Company and Coborn School
- Occupations: Singer; television presenter
- Television: Sweat the Small Stuff; This Morning; Children in Need; Ninja Warrior UK; The Xtra Factor; The Hit List
- Spouse: Marvin Humes (m. 2012)
- Children: 3
- Relatives: Sophie Piper (half-sister); Paul Ince (uncle); Tom Ince (cousin)
- Musical career
- Genres: R&B; pop
- Instrument: Vocals
- Years active: 2001–present
- Labels: Fascination; Polydor
- Website: rochellehumes.com

Rochelle Eulah Eileen Humes (née Wiseman; born 21 March 1989) is an English singer and television presenter. Humes began her career in the pop groups S Club Juniors and The Saturdays, and has gone on to co-present the ITV entertainment series Ninja Warrior UK. Humes regularly guest-hosts This Morning, and since 2019, she has co-presented the BBC game show The Hit List alongside husband Marvin Humes.

== Early life ==
Rochelle Eulah Eileen Wiseman was born in Barking, London, on 21 March 1989. She attended Frances Bardsley Academy for Girls in Hornchurch, Havering, as well as Colin's Performing Arts School. Her parents divorced when she was three years old, and she was raised alongside her half-sister Emily by their mother Roz and, partially, by her uncle Paul Ince. Humes is of Jamaican descent on her father's side, and English on her mother's.

== Music career ==
=== 2001–2005: S Club Juniors and S Club 8 ===
S Club Juniors were formed in 2001 as part of a reality series, known as S Club Search. Subsequently, 19 Entertainment, the management company that had created S Club 7 and auditioned S Club Juniors, decided they should perform as a support act at all of the venues on the tour. By the end of the tour, S Club Juniors had amassed a following and, with the encouragement of 19, Polydor Records signed the group. Their first single was called "One Step Closer". The single was promoted by the television series S Club Junior: The Story and was released in the UK on 22 April 2002 in a chart battle with the Sugababes who released their comeback single the same day. A second single was named "Automatic High", filmed in Spain, while S Club 7 began their fourth TV series. Released on 22 July 2002, the single reached number two in the UK charts selling 52,000 copies, and spent eight weeks inside the UK top 75 and sold in excess of 110,000 copies in the UK. Their third single "New Direction" released on 7 October reached number two in the UK charts selling 55,000 copies in the first week. It became their third consecutive top ten hit, selling 130,000 copies in six weeks. The Juniors released their debut album Together on 21 October reaching number five in its first week of sale and selling 40,000 copies. Their fourth single, "Puppy Love/Sleigh Ride", was released on 9 December 2002. The single debuted at number six in the UK charts, and sold 85,000 copies in the UK, spending eight weeks inside the UK Top 40.

The Juniors began work on their second album in January 2003 and the band joined S Club on their S Club United tour in April 2003 where the announcement came of a name change to S Club 8 and an upbeat fifth single, "Fool No More". The single released on 30 June reached number four in the UK chart, selling 26,000 copies in its first week and overall 75,000 copies in the UK. A second single, "Sundown", was released in the UK on 29 September 2003 reaching number four in the UK and became their sixth and final top ten hit, selling 37,000 copies in its first week and 80,000 altogether. The album, Sundown, was released on 13 October 2003 to dismal reviews. It reached number 13 in the UK charts falling to 40 in the second week. It sold 60,000 copies in the UK and 315,859 worldwide. A sixth single, "Don't Tell Me You're Sorry", was released in the UK on 29 December 2003 and reached number 11 in the UK, becoming their first single to chart outside the top ten.

S Club 8 went on to I Dream for 19 Entertainment as they had already agreed to do it. Unlike the S Club 7 shows which focused upon the band's fictional exploits, I Dream saw S Club 8 as members of a larger ensemble cast. I Dream revolved around the summer school Avalon Heights, run by Professor Toone (played by Christopher Lloyd), where the characters tried to improve on their talents in the performing arts. The show featured many songs and dances: normally two songs per episode. S Club 8 split up in early 2005.

In 2018, Rochelle shut down rumours of appearing in an S Club 8 reunion, and admitted that she struggled to remember most of her time in S Club 8.

=== 2005–2007: After S Club 8 ===
Between 2005 and 2006, following the split of S Club 8, Humes presented the BBC children's TV programme Smile which was her first presenting role. The programme aired on Sunday mornings on BBC Two. Humes left the programme in 2006 for unknown reasons and the programme was axed soon after.

In late October 2006, Humes was part of a group called The TigerLilys, who had a MySpace page displaying two tracks. The group disbanded without being signed by a label or releasing any material commercially. In February 2007, Humes appeared briefly on Never Mind the Buzzcocks as part of the show's regular Identity Parade feature, where contestants guess which person out of a line-up of five was featured in an old music video played only to the audience and viewers. The team, consisting of Bill Bailey, Russell Howard and Romeo Stodart (from the band The Magic Numbers), correctly picked Humes from the line-up. On 22 October 2009, after finding fame again with The Saturdays, Humes returned to appear as a guest on Never Mind the Buzzcocks on Phill Jupitus' team.

=== 2007–2014: The Saturdays ===
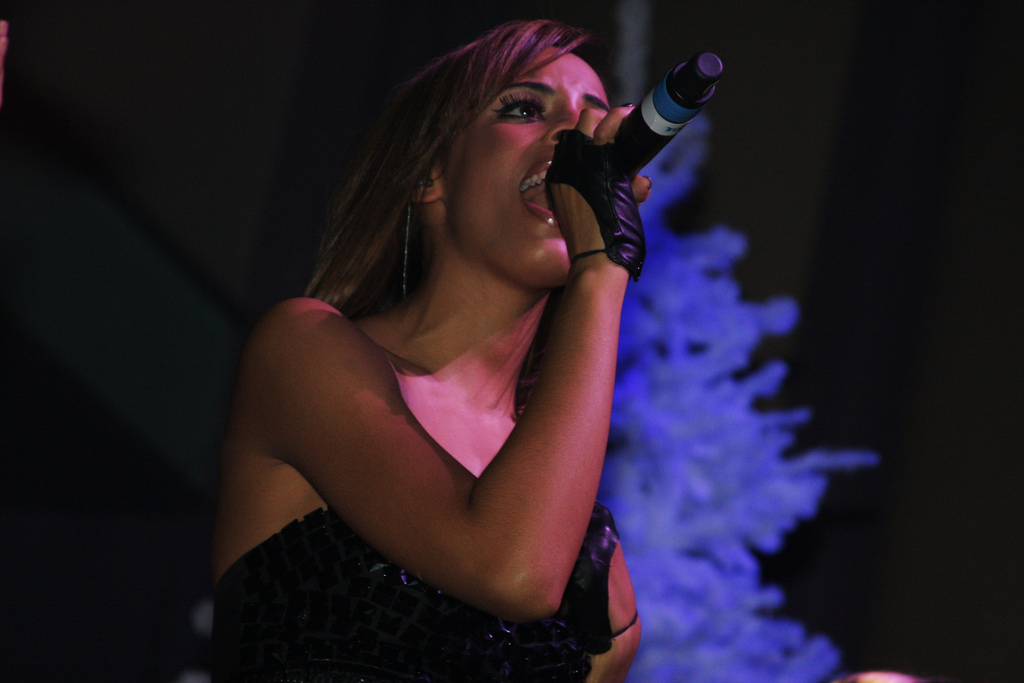
Humes performing in L.A. in December 2009.

Since 2007, Humes has been a member of girl group The Saturdays, whose other members are Una Healy, Mollie King, Vanessa White, and fellow former S Club 8 member Frankie Bridge. The Saturdays made their chart debut in July 2008 with "If This Is Love", which reached the top ten in the United Kingdom. Its follow-up single "Up" was released in October 2008, and the song debuted at number-five on the UK Singles Chart; to date the single has sold 310,000 copies in the UK alone as well as staying in the charts for exclusive 30 weeks. The band's debut studio album, Chasing Lights (2008) reached the top ten on the UK Albums Chart and was awarded Platinum selling status by the British Phonographic Industry (BPI). The album also saw release from top ten singles on the UK Singles Chart—"Issues" and "Just Can't Get Enough". "Work" was the final single to be released from Chasing Lights. Wordshaker (2009) was the band's follow-up studio album and also charted within the top ten on the UK Albums Chart and went on to gain a Silver selling status, with singles "Forever Is Over" and "Ego" charting within the top ten on the UK Singles Chart. Headlines! (2010) was released as the band's first Mini album and charted at number-three on the UK Albums Chart and number-ten on the Irish Album Chart. Headlines! saw release of top ten singles "Missing You" and "Higher" which features guest vocals from Flo Rida, both singles became a massive commercial success for the band with "Higher" spending a massive 20 weeks on the chart. The Saturdays third studio album, On Your Radar (2011) contained three highly successful selling singles and two of which—"Notorious" and "All Fired Up" charted within the top ten on the UK Singles Chart. "My Heart Takes Over" was also released from On Your Radar.

The band released another extended play, Chasing The Saturdays which was only released in North America. The band's fourth studio album, Living for the Weekend saw the release of the singles; "30 Days", "What About Us", "Gentleman" and "Disco Love". "30 Days" became the group's eleventh top-ten hit, while "What About Us" featuring Sean Paul saw The Saturdays earn their first number-one single in 2013, it is taken from their forthcoming fourth studio album, Living for the Weekend. The album's fourth single, "Disco Love", became their thirteenth top 10 single, with Living for the Weekend becoming their fourth top 10 album.

== Television and radio career ==
Humes began her TV presenting career by co-hosting children's morning TV show Smile from 2004 until 2006. In 2013, Humes was a regular panellist on the first series of Sweat the Small Stuff, then became a regular team captain from the second series.

In August 2013, Humes and her husband joined This Morning as regular stand-in presenters. They have no longer appeared together, however since 2018 Humes has guest hosted the show alongside a co-star. Humes also appeared as a regular host on the show alongside Phillip Schofield for a short period between November and December 2018, filling in for Schofield's co-star Holly Willoughby during her stint on I'm a Celebrity...Get Me Out of Here!

On 25 December 2013, Humes took part in the Strictly Come Dancing Christmas special. On 16 January 2014, she competed in The Great Sport Relief Bake Off. Since 2014, Humes has co-hosted segments of the BBC Children in Need telethon. On 3 January 2015, Humes and Alexander Armstrong co-hosted a one-off BBC One special called Frank Sinatra: Our Way.

In 2015, Humes began co-hosting Ninja Warrior UK for ITV, where she appears alongside Ben Shephard and Chris Kamara. On 18 June 2015, Humes was confirmed as a new co-host of The Xtra Factor, replacing Sarah-Jane Crawford. She hosted the twelfth series with her Sweat the Small Stuff co-star Melvin Odoom in 2015.

In 2016, Humes co-presented a new Sunday night entertainment series for ITV called The Next Great Magician alongside Stephen Mulhern. In 2017, she guest presented four episodes of Lorraine on ITV. In 2017, Humes sat in for Emma Willis on Sunday Morning Breakfast with Mulhern on multiple occasions on Heart London. In 2018, Humes took over Saturday early evenings (reformatted as Saturday drivetime) from Emma Bunton. At the end of 2019, Humes decided to take a break from her Heart FM commitments.

In 2017, Humes was announced to be voicing the role of a Voice Trumpet in the children's television series Teletubbies. On 20 November 2018, it was announced that Humes would co-host a music quiz show with husband Marvin Humes on BBC One called The Hit List.

== Other projects ==
In June 2014, Humes unveiled her first clothing range for Very. As of March 2018, Humes began working with fashion retailer New Look. In February 2019, Humes published her first children's book, The Mega Magic Hair Swap. In February 2020, Humes launched her own baby skin and haircare brand, My Little Coco. The company had sales of £3.7 million in 2022.

In 2021, Humes published her first cookbook, At Mama's Table: Easy & Delicious Meals From My Family To Yours.

In September 2026, Humes launched Eulah, an affordable skincare brand offering products for the face and body.

== Personal life ==
Humes married JLS member Marvin Humes on 27 July 2012 at Blenheim Palace. The couple have two daughters born in 2013 and 2017, and one son born in 2020.

== Filmography ==
Year	Title	Role	Notes
2001	S Club Search	Contestant	Reality show following formation of S Club 8
2004	I Dream	Rochelle	Drama series
2004–2006	Smile	Presenter	With Barney Harwood and Kirsten O'Brien
2010	The Saturdays: 24/7	Herself	Documentary series
2010	The Saturdays: What Goes On Tour	Herself	Documentary series
2010	Ghosthunting with...	Herself	With The Saturdays
2010	Strictly Come Dancing	Contestant	Children in Need special
2011	Big Fat Gypsy Gangster	Jodie	Film
2013	Chasing The Saturdays	Herself	Reality series
2013–2015	Sweat the Small Stuff	Team captain	Regular panellist (Series 1); Team captain (Series 2–4)
2013–2015	This Morning	Guest presenter	With Marvin Humes
2013	Strictly Come Dancing	Contestant	2013 Christmas special
2014	The Great Sport Relief Bake Off	Contestant	
2014–2019, 2024–present	Children in Need	Co-presenter	with Sir Terry Wogan, Nick Grimshaw and Marvin Humes
2015	Frank Sinatra: Our Way	Co-presenter	
2015–2022	Ninja Warrior UK	Co-presenter	with Ben Shephard and Chris Kamara
2015	The Xtra Factor	Co-presenter	1 series
2016	The Next Great Magician	Co-presenter	
2017–2018	Teletubbies	Voice Trumpets	Voiceover
2017–2018	Lorraine	Relief presenter	
2018	Eurovision: You Decide	Judge	
2018–present	This Morning	Relief presenter	Main relief presenter
2019–present	The Hit List	Co-presenter	6 series
2021	The Black Maternity Scandal	Presenter	Dispatches documentary
2021	The How to Chat Show	Co-presenter	Online only; ITVX
2022	Rochelle Humes: Interior Designer in the Making	Presenter	W
2023	Wish	Rochelle	UK version only

== Books ==
- The Mega Magic Hair Swap! (Bonnier, 2019) ISBN 9781787413757
- The Mega Magic Teacher Swap! (Bonnier, 2020) ISBN 9781787416017
- At Mama's Table (Ebury, 2021) ISBN 9781785043758
- My Little Dragon (Penguin, 2022) ISBN 9780241586518
- Little Box of Feelings (Penguin, 2025) ISBN 9780241783863
