= 19 Entertainment =

English-American production company

- Logo used since 2009
- Type: Subsidiary
- Industry: Entertainment
- Founded: April 1985; 41 years ago, in London, United Kingdom
- Founder: Simon Fuller
- Headquarters: London, United Kingdom
- Key people: Devon Hammonds (head of nonfiction, Sony Pictures Television)
- Products: Entertainment content; Intellectual property services; Idol series
- Revenue: $288.1 million (2008)
- Operating income: $75.1 million (2008)
- Net income: $19.0 million (2008)
- Number of employees: 40
- Parent: Sony
- Divisions: 19 Entertainment Inc; 19 Entertainment Ltd; 19 Recordings
- Website: www.sonypictures.com/tv/nonfiction

19 Entertainment is a British production television company with a focus on music owned by Sony and operated through Sony Pictures' Television Nonfiction division. Founded by Simon Fuller in London in 1985, the company co-produced Pop Idol in the United Kingdom with Thames Television in 2001. The Idol series has since become one of the most successful entertainment formats, sold to more than seventy countries around the world, including American Idol in the United States. 19 Entertainment is also responsible for the production of So You Think You Can Dance.

== Background and history ==
Founded in London, England in 1985, 19 Entertainment was named after the Paul Hardcastle song which was one of Simon Fuller's first notable successes while working as an A&R man for Chrysalis Records. In 2001 the company co-produced Pop Idol in the United Kingdom with Thames Television. An immense success, Maggie Brown in The Guardian states, "the show became a seminal reality/entertainment format once on air that autumn".

In March 2005, 19 Entertainment founder Simon Fuller sold the company to Robert Sillerman's CKX, Inc. in a cash and stock deal worth $210 million. Subsequent to the deal Fuller remained in his role as CEO of 19 Entertainment and added the new role of director of CKX. In his dual role Fuller was able to effectively co-ordinate all creative aspects of the CKX business until January 2010 when, as he approached the end of his employment contract with CKX, Inc., he decided to start up a new business, XIX Entertainment, while still acting as a consultant to CKX / 19 and as an Executive Producer of 19's shows. Following this, CKX announced its intention to shift 19 to becoming a US business focusing solely on American Idol and So You Think You Can Dance brands. 19's old Headquarters in Battersea, London became the headquarters for Simon Fuller's new business, XIX, while the base for 19 Entertainment was transferred to Los Angeles.

In 2009, the company announced the purchase of London-based Storm Model Management, one of the world's top modelling agencies. This business was sold back to Storm's management in 2013, ending the firm's activities in fashion.

In September 2010, much of 19's non- American Idol business was sold to Simon Fuller's new business XIX Entertainment. This included 19's non-Idol management clients such as David and Victoria Beckham, Andy Murray, Annie Lennox, The Spice Girls, Lewis Hamilton, S Club 7, Carrie Underwood, David Cook, and others. Also transferred to XIX Entertainment were Roland Mouret and Victoria Beckham's fashion businesses.

Sillerman and partners accepted an offer from Apollo Global Management on July 21, 2011 to purchase the entire stock of CKX, Inc, and the business was re-branded as CORE Media Group in 2012 with 19 Entertainment becoming the group's primary west coast division. On April 28, 2016, CORE Media Group filed for Chapter 11 bankruptcy. In 2018 CORE Media Group purchased Eli Holzman’s Intellectual Property Corporation with Holzman and fellow IPC founder Aaron Saidman leading the enlarged group, rebranded from CORE Media to Industrial Media Inc.

In March 2022, Sony Pictures Television purchased Industrial Media for $350 million, with Industrial becoming Sony Pictures Television’s nonfiction division continuing to be led by Holtzman and Saidman and with a remit to expand the group.

In April 2023, 19 Entertainment and Reservoir Media announced a joint venture with the aim of signing new publishing deals with contestants featured on American Idol.

In January 2025, Joey Arbagey, formerly of Epic Records, was named head of 19 Entertainment's music division. Arbagey will oversee 19 Publishing, 19 Records and 19 Management. He will also oversee related partnerships, including with distribution partner BMG.

== 19 Television series ==
=== Current series ===
- American Idol (2002–2016, 2018–present)

=== Former series ===
- Miami 7 (1999)
- L.A. 7 (2000)
- S Club 7 Go Wild! (2000)
- S Club Search (2001)
- Hollywood 7 (2001)
- Viva S Club (2002)
- American Juniors (2003)
- All American Girl (2003)
- I Dream (2004)
- So You Think You Can Dance (2005–2024)
- Little Britain USA (2008)
- If I Can Dream (2010)

== 19 Entertainment films ==
- Spice World (co-production with Icon Productions and Columbia Pictures) (1997)
- Seeing Double (co-production with Columbia Pictures) (2003)
- From Justin to Kelly (co-production with 20th Century Fox) (2003)
- Giving You Everything (2007)

=== S Club 7 - TV films ===
- Back to the '50s (1999)
- Boyfriends & Birthdays (1999)
- Artistic Differences (2000)
- Christmas Special (2000)

== See also ==
- XIX Entertainment
- Simon Fuller
- Reservoir Media
- BMG
