= One Step Closer (S Club Juniors song) =

2002 single by S Club Juniors

Single by S Club Juniors

from the album Together
- B-side: "Reach"; "Together"
- Released: 22 April 2002
- Studio: Rose & Foster (London, England)
- Length: 3:08
- Label: Polydor; 19
- Songwriters: Cathy Dennis; Mike Percy; Tim Lever
- Producers: Nick Foster; Mike Rose

S Club Juniors singles chronology
"One Step Closer" (2002)	"Automatic High" (2002)

Frankie Sandford singles chronology
"One Step Closer" (2002)	"Automatic High" (2002)

"One Step Closer" is a song by British pop group S Club Juniors, written by Cathy Dennis, Mike Percy, and Tim Lever and produced by Nick Foster and Mike Rose. Serving as S Club Juniors' debut single, it was released as the lead single from their first album, Together (2002), on 22 April 2002. It peaked at number two on the UK Singles Chart, losing out to the number-one spot by 1,000 copies. The song served as the theme for the US reality television series American Juniors (2003).

== Composition ==
Frankie Sandford sings the first verse. Calvin Goldspink sings the first part of the first and the third bridges. Jay Asforis sings the second part of the first and the third bridges and the first part of the second bridge. Daisy Evans sings the second verse. Hannah Richings sings a backing vocal during the second verse. Stacey McClean sings the second part of the second bridge and backing vocals during the final chorus. Rochelle Wiseman sings backing vocals in the final chorus. Aaron Renfree does not have any solos in this song. Recording was produced by Tim Lever and done at Hollywood's famed Radio Recorders.

== Release and chart performance ==
"One Step Closer" was released in the United Kingdom on 22 April 2002. During its first week on sale, it reached number two on the UK Singles Chart, selling approximately 84,400 copies. It remained within the top 40 for 11 weeks, until mid-July. In Ireland, the song peaked at number five. It also entered the top 20 of the European Hot 100 Singles chart, reaching number 14. In New Zealand, the single was released on 5 August 2002 but did not chart.

== Music video ==
The video shows the band in a classroom which changes into a disco. The noise attracts the attention of the headmaster (played by Lee Cornes) who arrives only to find it a classroom again.

== Track listings ==
UK CD1

1. "One Step Closer"
2. "Reach" (special S Club 7 and S Club Juniors version)
3. "Together"
4. "One Step Closer" (CD-ROM)

UK CD2

1. "One Step Closer"
2. "One Step Closer" (karaoke version)
3. "S Club Juniors Girls Reveal Their Secrets to the S Club 7 Boys"

UK cassette single

1. "One Step Closer"
2. "One Step Closer" (acapella version)

== Credits and personnel ==
Credits are lifted from the Together album booklet.

Studios

- Recorded at Rose & Foster Studios (London, England)
- Mastered at Transfermation (London, England)

Personnel

- Cathy Dennis – writing
- Mike Percy – writing
- Tim Lever – writing
- Paul Gendler – guitars
- Nina Cockburn – violin
- Nick Foster – production, arrangement
- Mike Rose – production, arrangement
- Jewels & Stone – additional production and mix
- Dean Murphy – recording
- Ben Foster – additional arrangement and score
- Richard Dowling – mastering

== Charts ==
=== Weekly charts ===
Chart (2002)	Peak position
Europe (Eurochart Hot 100)	11
Ireland (IRMA)	5
Scottish Singles Sales (Official Charts)	2
UK Singles (Official Charts)	2

=== Year-end charts ===
Chart (2002)	Position
Ireland (IRMA)	55
UK Singles (OCC)	23

== Certifications ==
Region	Certification	Certified units/sales
United Kingdom (BPI)	Silver	200,000^{^}
^{^} Shipments figures based on certification alone.

== American Juniors version ==
"One Step Closer"

Single by American Juniors

from the album Kids in America
- Released: 12 August 2003
- Length: 3:05
- Label: Jive
- Songwriters: Cathy Dennis; Tim Lever; Mike Percy

"One Step Closer" was covered by American Juniors, recorded by the ten finalists on the American Juniors television program, not just the five who won. It was released by Jive Records on 12 August 2003. This version reached number two in Canada but did not chart in the US.

=== Track listing ===
1. "One Step Closer"
2. "Kids in America" (pop mix)
3. "Kids in America" (rock mix)

=== Charts ===
Chart (2003)	Peak position
Canada (Nielsen SoundScan)	2
