= Together (S Club Juniors album) =

Studio album by S Club Juniors
- Released: 21 October 2002
- Genre: Pop
- Length: 45:25
- Label: Polydor

S Club Juniors chronology
Together (2002)	Sundown (2003)

Together is the debut album by S Club Juniors. It was released in 2002 and went to number 5 on the UK Albums Chart. The album has been certified Platinum by the BPI.

== Track listing ==
No.	Title	Writer(s)	Producer(s)	Length
1.	"One Step Closer"	Cathy Dennis, Mike Percy, Tim Lever	Jewels & Stone	3:10
2.	"Automatic High"	Julian Gingell, Barry Stone, Terry Ronald, Nina Madhoo	Jewels & Stone and Terry Ronald	3:06
3.	"New Direction"	Georgie Dennis, Ricky Hanley, Gary White	Jewels & Stone and Gary White	4:17
4.	"One Fine Day"	Gerry Goffin, Carole King	Jewels & Stone	2:20
5.	"Puppy Love"	Paul Anka	Jewels & Stone	3:05
6.	"Feel the Beat"	Anders Henjer, Mikkel S. Eriksen	Jewels & Stone	3:19
7.	"Wherever You Are"	Cathy Dennis, Simon Ellis	Jewels & Stone	3:44
8.	"I Come Alive"	Paul Wilson, Andy Watkins, Tracy Ackerman	Sugargang	2:52
9.	"Together"	Thomas Nichols, Alexander von Soos	Mike Rose & Nick Foster	3:25
10.	"Only You"	Hannah Robinson, Adrian Bushby	Jewels & Stone	4:11
11.	"Anytime Anywhere"	Cathy Dennis, Andrew Leslie Todd	Mike Rose & Nick Foster	3:49
12.	"You Are the One"	Mikkel S. Eriksen, Hallgeir Rustan, Tor Erik Hermansen	Jewels & Stone	4:34
13.	"New Direction" (Magic Fly Radio Version)	Georgie Dennis, Ricky Hanley, Gary White, Didier Marouani	Jewels & Stone	3:40

== Charts ==
=== Weekly charts ===
Chart (2002)	Peak position
Irish Albums (IRMA)	32
Scottish Albums (Official Charts)	6
UK Albums (Official Charts)	5

=== Year-end charts ===
Chart (2002)	Position
UK Albums (OCC)	54

== Certifications ==
Region	Certification	Certified units/sales
United Kingdom (BPI)	Platinum	300,000^{^}
^{^} Shipments figures based on certification alone.
