= Stacey McClean =

British pop singer

- Born: Stacey McClean; 17 February 1989 (age 37); Bispham, Blackpool, England
- Origin: Lancashire, England
- Genres: Pop, R&B
- Occupation: Singer
- Years active: 2001–present
- Label: Polydor (2001–2005)

Stacey Franks (née McClean, born 17 February 1989) is an English pop singer. She was part of the S Club 7 spin-off group, S Club 8 and in 2009 took part in the sixth series of The X Factor.

== Career ==
=== 2001–2005: S Club Juniors ===
McClean was born in Bispham, Blackpool, Lancashire. In 2001, aged 12, she auditioned for the children’s pop group S Club Juniors, and won a place. Whilst in the group, Stacey, along with her bandmate Rochelle Humes, usually wore her hair in her naturally curly style. The group released three singles and an album, and guest starred in Viva S Club.

After S Club 7 disbanded in 2003, 19 Entertainment decided to keep S Club Juniors going, so they were renamed S Club 8 and released a further three songs and a second album. In 2004, McClean, along with the other members of S Club 8, appeared in the children's musical television comedy I Dream, which was filmed in Spain. The programme lasted for thirteen episodes, from 22 September to 13 December 2004, and was broadcast on BBC One. I Dream spawned a single and album, the latter of which failed to chart in the top 100. S Club 8 disbanded in 2005, after almost 4 years together.

=== 2009: The X Factor ===
In 2009, McClean auditioned for The X Factor in Manchester, singing the Christina Aguilera song "Ain't No Other Man". Her audition was shown on the 100th episode of the show, screened on 19 September 2009. She made it through to boot camp, then after the first task of singing with other acts she made it into the top 50 acts, where she had to sing a solo performance to reach the final 24.

She made the final 24, and along with five others was placed in the Girls (16–24) category, in which her mentor was Dannii Minogue assisted by her sister, Kylie. In the final audition, held at Atlantis, The Palm, Palm Jumeirah, Dubai, McClean sang the Britney Spears song "Sometimes", but was eliminated before the live shows.

=== 2010–present: Recent work ===
In 2010, McClean took up a post as a receptionist at the UK radio station talkSPORT. She continues to pursue her singing career in her spare time.

In December 2010, McClean began a six-month tour of the UK as one of the stars of G*Mania an all singing all dancing stage production.

As of 2025, McClean has performed as a wedding singer.

== Personal life ==
McClean attended Beacon Hill High School in Blackpool. She worked as an Admin manager at 106.5 Central Radio in Lancashire whilst co-hosting the breakfast show, but has since left. She lives in London. She is a quarter Nigerian in her ethnicity. Stacey was previously married to former footballer Fraser Franks. She gave birth to their daughter, Nellie, in 2019. In 2023, McClean announced her separation from Franks. She confirmed their divorce in an Instagram post in August 2024.

== Media appearances ==
=== Television ===
| Year | TV Show | Role | Notes |
|---|---|---|---|
| 2001 | S Club Search | Contestant | |
| 2002 | S Club Juniors: The Story | Herself | |
| 2002 | Viva S Club | Herself | |
| 2002 | Smash Hits Poll Winners Party | Herself | |
| 2002–2003 | Top of the Pops | with S Club 8 | Five appearances |
| 2004 | I Dream | with S Club 8 | Herself |
| 2004 | Smile | Two episodes | Herself |
| 2009 | The X Factor | Contestant | |
| 2012 | Never Mind the Buzzcocks | Line-up Contestant | |

=== Radio ===
| Year | Show | Role | Notes |
|---|---|---|---|
| 2010 | The Late Show with Ian Collins | Herself | |
